= Bachelor Father (American TV series) =

American sitcom (1957–1962)

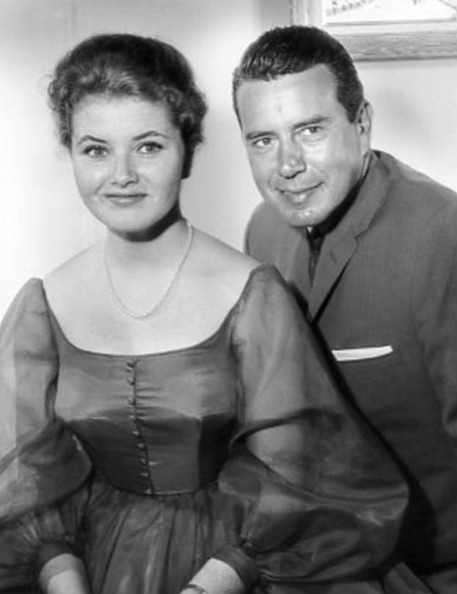
- Noreen Corcoran and John Forsythe, 1961
- Genre: Sitcom
- Starring: John Forsythe; Noreen Corcoran; Sammee Tong; Jimmy Boyd; Bernadette Withers
- Theme music composer: Dave Kahn; Melvyn Lenard Gordon; Jeff Alexander; Larry Ornstein; Johnny Williams; Conrad Salinger
- Opening theme: "Bachelor Father Serenade" (1957–1958) "Bachelor Father Theme" (1958–1959) "Bachelor Father Theme" (1959–1960) "Bentley's Theme" (1960–62)
- Composer: Stanley Wilson
- Country of origin: United States
- Original language: English
- No. of seasons: 5
- No. of episodes: 157

Production
- Producers: Harry Ackerman; Everett Freeman; Robert Sparks
- Camera setup: Single-camera
- Running time: 30 mins.
- Production companies: Bachelor Productions; Revue Studios

Original release
- Network: CBS
- Release: September 15, 1957 – June 7, 1959
- Network: NBC
- Release: September 17, 1959 – July 6, 1961
- Network: ABC
- Release: September 21, 1961 – September 25, 1962

Related
- General Electric Theater

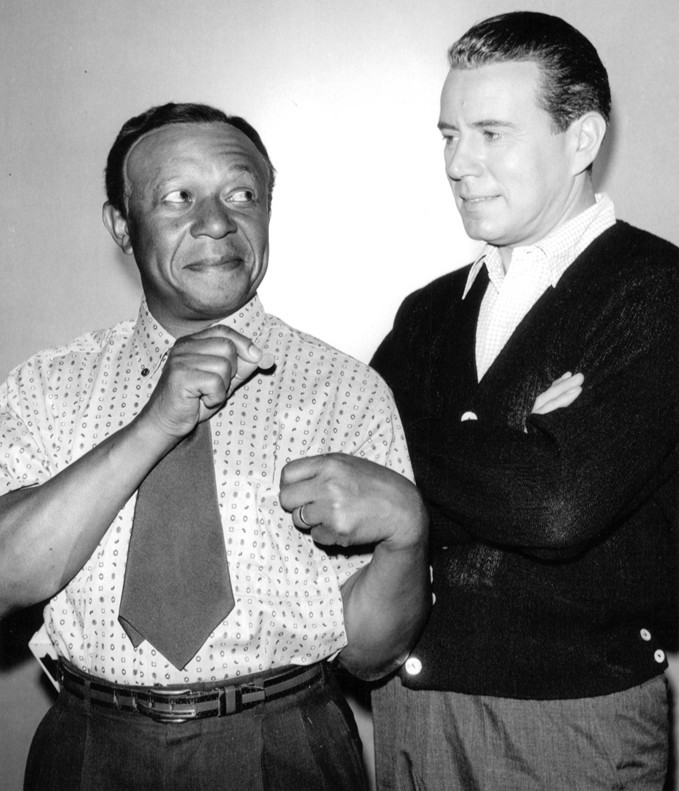
Guest star Eddie "Rochester" Anderson and John Forsythe

Bachelor Father is an American sitcom starring John Forsythe, Noreen Corcoran and Sammee Tong. The series first premiered on CBS in September 1957 before moving to NBC for the third season in 1959. The series' fifth and final season aired on ABC. A total of 157 episodes were aired. The series was based on "A New Girl in His Life", which aired on General Electric Theater on May 26, 1957.

Bachelor Father is the only primetime series ever to run in consecutive years on the three major television networks (ABC, CBS and NBC).

== Overview ==
Bachelor Father follows the adventures of Bentley Gregg, a wealthy bachelor attorney living in Beverly Hills who assumes the responsibility of raising his niece, Kelly (Noreen Corcoran), after her parents die in an automobile accident. Other members of the cast included houseboy Peter Tong (Sammee Tong), teenage neighbor and Kelly's on-and-off boyfriend, Howard Meechum (Jimmy Boyd), Kelly's best friend, Ginger Farrell (Bernadette Withers) and Jasper, the dog. Withers appeared in 51 episodes from 1957 to 1962; Boyd in 37 from 1958 to 1962. Plots center on Bentley's adjustments to his new role as an adoptive parent, his search for the right woman to share his life, Kelly facing the usual problems of adolescence and young adulthood, Kelly's ritual of passage from high school to college, and Peter's misadventures with his family, love life and financial schemes.

Asian rights activist Guy Aoki has praised the show for prominently featuring Asian actors and storylines, including "feisty" comedian Sammee Tong and Victor Sen Yung, the scheming "Cousin Charlie", "a slick, Americanized character. I thought it was great that way back in the ’50s, audiences saw a Chinese American who acted just like anyone else."

The program's final season storylines led to Kelly's impending marriage to Bentley's junior partner Warren Dawson (Aron Kincaid). The two met, became engaged, interacted with other couples and even met Dawson's parents (who flew in from New York on short notice), all in a span of three episodes. Without mention or explanation, Kincaid's character was dropped after four episodes and by the series finale, Kelly is seeing a different man with no marriage plans. Meechum (Boyd) appears in several Season 5 episodes, but he is never developed as a serious romantic interest for Kelly. As the series was canceled after 157 episodes, Bachelor Father did not have a formal series finale.

== Primary cast ==
According to John Forsythe, the Bentley Gregg character was based on two well-known Beverly Hills bachelors at the time. He combined their names and used them for the characters in the program. Because of the implication in the program of Gregg's aversion to marriage, no serious thought was given to casting a 'regular' or steady woman for him. Instead, Gregg is forever dating different women with only a handful ever getting a 'second' date with him.

Forsythe noted that casting the main characters took considerable effort. Then actor (and future California governor and United States president) Ronald Reagan, who hosted General Electric Theater from 1954 to 1962, suggested Corcoran for the role, believing her to be a 'typical teenager' and closer to what a normal 13-year-old was like, and Forsythe agreed. Corcoran was already an experienced actress with film and television roles to her credit. She was 18 years old when the program left the air and had virtually 'grown up' into a young woman during the show's five-year run.

Casting Bentley Gregg's houseboy was difficult as well. Sammee Tong was cast based primarily on his experience as a stand-up comedian. Forsythe believed much of the program's success resulted from the interaction between Tong and himself and that Tong had great comic timing. He also stated that Tong's character was unique for the time and that he was not the "typical" Asian house servant. Forsythe insisted on Tong being a major character on the program. Several of the program plots center around Tong, many dealing with his attempts to improve his position in life. Although none ever pan out (much like Bentley or Kelly) he does develop as a character through the life of the program.

Kelly's (Noreen Corcoran) best friend was Ginger, played by Bernadette Withers.

=== Guest stars ===
Among the series guest stars were Edgar Bergen, Bill Bixby, Billy Gray, Ryan O'Neal, Frankie Laine, Mary Tyler Moore and singer Patti Page. Eddie Anderson, who portrayed "Rochester" on The Jack Benny Program, reprised his role in the Season 5 episode, "Pinch That Penny". Besides the 'Benny' link, the series had connections to The George Burns and Gracie Allen Show as Harry Von Zell appeared in five season three episodes as Bentley Gregg's friend and next-door neighbor. The Burns' son, Ronnie Burns, appeared in two episodes, as well. Fifteen-year-old Linda Evans also appeared in a guest spot on the series as one of Kelly's friends. Evans and Forsythe later starred in the primetime soap opera Dynasty together.

Other guest stars include:

- Jack Albertson
- Eddie "Rochester" Anderson
- Frank Bank
- Jack Benny
- June Blair
- Whitney Blake
- Jean Carson
- Richard Collier
- Donna Douglas
- Barbara Eden
- Cheryl Holdridge
- Arlene Howell
- Charles Lane
- Sue Ane Langdon
- Cherylene Lee
- Jenny Maxwell
- Gisele MacKenzie
- Ann McCrea
- Howard McNear
- Joyce Meadows
- Joanna Moore
- Leslie Parrish
- Dean Reed
- Evelyn Scott
- Vito Scotti
- Olan Soule
- Charlotte Stewart

== Broadcast history ==
The series' pilot episode, "A New Girl in His Life", originally aired on General Electric Theater on May 26, 1957. The series was first telecast on CBS on September 15, 1957. It originally aired on Sunday evenings on alternating weeks with The Jack Benny Program (Benny guest starred on one episode) opposite NBC's Sally and ABC's Maverick with James Garner. The show moved to NBC as a weekly series on Thursday nights in June 1959 (the Summer 1959 run on NBC were reruns of previous CBS episodes) and concluded its run on that network in September 1961. The series then moved on to ABC on Tuesday nights in 1961 for its final season. The last "first run" episode (the 157th unique episode) aired on June 26, 1962, with reruns filling the remainder of the summer.

Bachelor Father is the only series to ever run in consecutive seasons on all three major TV networks of the time (ABC, CBS and NBC). On November 22, 1963, a re-run episode of Bachelor Father was airing on several NBC affiliates in the Eastern Time Zone, Don Pardo broke in at 1:45 PM EST with the first bulletin of the shooting of President John F. Kennedy in Dallas.

== Episodes ==
=== Series overview ===
Season	Episodes	Originally released		
Season	Episodes	First released	Last released	Network
1	20	September 15, 1957	June 8, 1958	CBS
2	20	September 14, 1958	June 7, 1959	CBS
3	37	September 17, 1959	June 9, 1960	NBC
4	40	September 15, 1960	July 6, 1961	NBC
5	40	September 21, 1961	June 26, 1962	ABC

=== Season 1 (1957–58) ===
No. overall	No. in season	Title	Directed by	Written by	Original release date
1	1	"Bentley and the P.T.A."	Jerry Hopper	Arthur Alsberg & Nate Monaster	September 15, 1957
After her parents die in an automobile accident, wealthy bachelor lawyer Bentley Gregg (John Forsythe) has legal custody of his teenage niece Kelly (Noreen Corcoran). Having Kelly around has greatly changed Bentley's lifestyle. Bentley tells his house boy Peter (Sammee Tong) that he has a date with a beautiful movie starlet named Angela Giovanni. She is also a very important and valuable client. Because he is worried Kelly may be sick, Bentley has a Doctor (Paul Maxey) come by. The Doctor says Kelly will be fine. Bentley is late for the date and Angela slams the door in his face. He manages to get a second date, but then finds out it's on the same night he is to attend a P.T.A. meeting. Bentley plans to go to the meeting and duck out soon after to make his date. However, things don't go as planned. But thanks to Kelly, Bentley gets Angela to sign a contract. Alice Backes as Secretary Vickie. Madge Blake as Mrs. Bowman. Mary Field as PTA Spokeswoman. Florida Friebus as Mrs. Banks. Almira Sessions as Cleaning Woman.
2	2	"Bentley Versus the Girl Scouts"	Jerry Hopper	Jerry Davis & Howard Leeds	September 29, 1957
Despite a late night, Bentley agrees to drive Kelly to her Pathfinder Outing meeting place. Kelly wants him to meet their leader, Marilyn Hesselroth (Diane Brewster). Bentley makes a play for Marilyn, but she shoots him down fast. Bentley and his houseboy Peter (Sammee Tong) drive out to the campsite. At first they are lost, but then they find the girls. Bentley tries to woo Marilyn again. She puts him to work chopping wood, digging holes and putting up tents. That evening Bentley has Peter bring out a table, chairs and a fancy meal to the campsite. Bentley and Marilyn have a nice time and he invites her to dinner for the next evening. Back at home, Kelly tells Bentley that she thinks Marilyn is in love with him even though she's already engaged. Bentley comes up with a plan that completely discourages Marilyn. Kelly appreciates what Bentley did. Bernadette Withers as 'Troup Leader' Grabowski. June Blair as Woman #1.
3	3	"Uncle Bentley and the Lady Doctor"	Jerry Hopper	Arthur Alsberg & Nate Monaster	October 13, 1957
Bentley has been trying for weeks to get Kelly to clean her room and keep it clean. Bentley winds up yelling at Kelly and then he feels bad about it. Secretary Vickie tells Bentley that maybe she's doing it for attention and suggests talking to a child psychiatrist. Bentley meets Dr. Barbara Ruskin (Mary Webster), who happens to be quite beautiful. After getting some advice about Kelly, Bentley makes a play for the Doctor, but he doesn't get far. Bentley still loses his temper with Kelly and goes to see Dr. Ruskin again. She says if he can resolve the thing with Kelly by Saturday, she'll go out with him. Bentley and Peter make the house a mess so Kelly can see what her room is like. At first it seems as though Bentley's plan isn't working. Mrs. Hartman (Mary Field) and her daughter Nancy (Cheryl Miller) come by to take Kelly to the movies. Mrs. Hartman is shocked at how the house looks. Now Kelly understands. Bentley has his date with Barbara and finds out she may have had a hand in Bentley's success.
4	4	"A Date with Kelly"	Jerry Hopper	Jerry Davis & Howard Leeds	October 27, 1957
Adrian Benson (Shirley Patterson), an old acquaintance of Bentley's is in town. Bentley calls her up for a date that evening, but she is unavailable. Kelly overhears and says she wishes she could go on a date like the one Bentley promised Adrian. Bentley tells Kelly he will take her out that evening. She is very excited and makes plans to look very nice for the date. Later, Adrian shows up at Bentley's office and tells him that it turns out she is free for this evening. Forgetting his date with Kelly, he leaves with Adrian. Peter finds out and has to tell Kelly, who is now heartbroken. Peter gets a hold of Bentley and tells him how upset Kelly is. Bentley tells Adrian he has to leave. Adrian is now angry and doesn't want him to call her. Bentley apologizes to Kelly, but she is still upset. The next day, Peter promises Kelly that Bentley will take her out that night. Adrian agrees to go out with Bentley that evening. Peter calls Bentley and now Bentley must cancel his date with Adrian, again. Kelly and Bentley go on a wonderful date. When they get home, they find Adrian there because Kelly called her earlier. Bentley and Adrian then go out.
5	5	"Uncle Bentley and the Aunts"	Jerry Hopper	Arthur Alsberg & Nate Monaster	November 10, 1957
Kelly hopes to be voted into the Lucky 13 Club, as all her friends are in it. However, one of the girls voted against her and Kelly doesn't get in. Bentley invites three of the girls from the club to lunch in hopes of finding out why Kelly wasn't voted in. He learns that the girl who voted against Kelly has an aunt who dislikes him. But the girls won't tell Bentley the name of the woman. With Peter's help, Bentley learns he has dated six of the girls' aunts. So, he goes through the list hoping to find the one, but none of them are it. It turns out that the aunt is Martha (Mabel Albertson), a lawyer he has a case against. Martha says she will talk to her niece. When Bentley tells Kelly the good news, Kelly says she's been in the club for two days. Bernadette Withers as Ginger Farrell. Jean Moorhead as Cynthia. Jana Lund as Gladys.
6	6	"Bentley and the Revolving Housekeepers"	Jerry Hopper	Arthur Alsberg & Nate Monaster	November 24, 1957
Kelly has been very disorganized lately. Mrs. Carter (Florida Friebus), Kelly's principal, calls and wants to talk to Bentley about Kelly. Bentley feels that Kelly could benefit from some female supervision. He wants to hire a lady housekeeper, much to Peter's chagrin. Bentley sees Mr. Saunders (Joseph Kearns) at the domestics agency. First, a Mrs. Barker arrives. Peter and Kelly have the house full of various animals and Mrs. Barker leaves quickly. Then a Mrs. Farrell (Edith Evanson) arrives. Peter threatens to leave, but he doesn't go through with it. Mrs. Farrell has Bentley eating foods he doesn't like. Bentley's date, Patty Robbins (Barbara Eden), comes by. Turns out Patty knows Mrs. Farrell and they spend the evening reminiscing, ruining Bentley's date. Mrs. Farrell puts a damper on his poker game with the guys. Mrs. Carter tells Bentley that Kelly had been doing so well, but lately just doesn't seem to be the same. Fortunately for Bentley, Mrs. Farrell decides to work for a family with a little baby. William Kendis as Red. Tommy Farrell as Cecil. Paul Lambert as Freddie.
7	7	"Uncle Bentley Keeps His Promise"	Jerry Hopper	Jay Sommers & Don Nelson	December 8, 1957
Kelly is having her first party at the house since she moved in. Kelly brags to her friends Helen and Marcia about all the famous people Bentley knows. Helen asks if he could get teen singing star Ronny Mann to come to Kelly's party tomorrow. Kelly brags and says yes he can. Bentley tells Kelly he will see what he can do. He makes several unsuccessful attempts to talk to Ronnie. Bentley then runs into a mustache-disguised Ronnie in the park. Not knowing it really is Ronnie, Bentley asks if he would like to impersonate Ronnie at Kelly's party. Ronnie agrees. The girls at the party are all excited to see Ronnie and he sings for them. Bentley comes to realize it really is Ronnie Mann. Herb Vigran as Manager. Joby Baker as Boy at Stage Door. Bill Erwin as Security Guard. Phil Arnold as Telegraph Messenger. Joan Freeman as Girl #1.
8	8	"Bentley and the Baby Sitter"	Jerry Hopper	Arthur Alsberg & Nate Monaster	December 22, 1957
Kelly tells Peter that she has her first baby-sitting job for that evening. Bentley thinks she's too young and he doesn't want her to do it, but he says O.K. Bentley sends Peter to babysit with Kelly. Bentley has a date with Doris Winslow (Lisa Davis), but all he can do is worry about Kelly. When he can't reach them by phone, Bentley takes Doris and stops by the Logan house. Turns out everything is fine. Jimmy Logan (Ricky Kelman) had taken the phone off the hook. Mrs. Logan lets her female friends know that Kelly's uncle is a handsome bachelor and he stops by to check on Kelly. Suddenly, Kelly's babysitting service is fully booked. Ginger tells Bentley that the other girls can't get babysitting jobs anymore because Kelly is getting all of them. Bentley learns that the women hire Kelly just to get a chance to meet him. Some are single mothers and others just pretend to have children. Bentley is on another date with Doris when he hears over the radio that a prisoner escaped from jail. Doris gets mad because Bentley goes to check on Kelly. Doris figures the only way she can spend an uninterrupted evening with Bentley is to hire Kelly as a babysitter. But Bentley has a date with Ann Stanford. Bill Erwin as Mr. Logan.
9	9	"Bentley and the Talent Contest"	Jerry Hopper	Arthur Alsberg & Nate Monaster	January 5, 1958
Phil Corey (Bartlett Robinson), Ralph Parker (Les Tremayne) and Bentley are discussing their 13 year old daughters. Ralph brings up the talent contest that the school is going to have. Bentley wants Kelly to appear in the talent show, but Kelly says she really doesn't do anything that well. Kelly decides to be an usherette instead. Bentley visits Miss Gilman (Kathleen Case), the ballet instructor, and sees that Kelly isn't as good as the other students. He then sees Miss Lindstrom (Elvia Allman), the piano teacher, and gets the same impression. Peter helps Kelly to work up a comedy routine of impressions of celebrities reciting "Mary had a Little Lamb." As Groucho, Kelly wiggles her duct tape eyebrows during each line. As Edward G. Robinson, Kelly talks out of one side of her mouth and adds the word "see" and "nyah" to the end of each line. Her Marilyn Monroe wears a boa and sighs at the end of each line. Kelly decides to still be an usherette, and Bentley tells her that he'll support her no matter what. A girl who had stolen Kelly's Marilyn Monroe nursery rhyme act, wins first prize. Before everyone leaves, the emcee (Shirley Mitchell) announces that there is also a trophy for the most popular student as chosen by the faculty and the other students. Kelly wins that, to the delight of Bentley and Peter. Cindy Carol as Karen. Bonnie Fields as Ballet Dancer #2.
10	10	"Bentley, the Homemaker"	Jerry Hopper	Arthur Alsberg & Nate Monaster	January 19, 1958
Bentley has been busy just about every evening. He finds out from Peter that Kelly is spending every evening with the Fuller family down the street. Kelly tells Bentley how much fun she has at the Fuller house and how nice Mr. Fuller is. Feeling he is neglecting her, Bentley makes plans to spend the evening with Kelly. But time with Kelly gets cut short when old friend Harry McKey (Gordon Jones) comes by with two women. Kelly says she doesn't mind and she'll just go to the Fuller's. Bentley gets the impression that's where she would rather be. Jack Benny comes by Bentley's office for some legal advice. Jack complains about a neighbor getting oranges from his tree. Bentley agrees to forego a fee if Jack will do him a favor. Bentley arranges a surprise outing with Jack and Kelly to Disneyland. The morning of the outing, Bentley learns Kelly went clam digging with the Fullers. Bentley speaks with Mrs. Fuller and finds out he has nothing to worry about as far as Kelly is concerned. All the Fuller children are now at Bentley's house and he gets to entertain them.
11	11	"Bentley and His Junior Image"	Jerry Hopper	Arthur Alsberg & Nate Monaster; Based on a story idea by Lydia Nathan	February 2, 1958
Kelly's 13-year-old friend Helen Parker has a date with a 16-year-old boy and Helen's dad doesn't like the idea. Kelly asks Bentley's opinion on whether Helen should date an older boy. Bentley says he has complete confidence in Helen's judgement. Bentley pleads Helen's case with her father Ralph Parker (Les Tremayne), but Ralph is still against it. Bentley runs into Matt Finletter (Francis DeSales). Matt tells him how his 15-and-a-half-year-old son is a younger version of Bentley. Helen tells Kelly she has a boy for her so they could double date. Ralph calls Bentley and tells him if Kelly double dates with Helen, then he has no problem with it. Bentley is dress shopping with Kelly and he's surprised at the styles girls are wearing now. Bentley learns that Kelly's date is Matt Finletter, Jr. He is now a bundle of nerves over Kelly's date and he cuts short his date with Carol Spencer (Barbara Darrow). Bentley goes to the house where the party is at. He runs into Matt Jr.'s mother, Mary Finletter (Marian Marsh), who was also checking up on the date. Mary tells him this is Matt Jr.'s first date as well and he shouldn't worry about how Matt Sr. described his son. When Kelly gets home, she tells Bentley how some of the other parents came by to check on them. She's glad Bentley trusted her and didn't come by. Charlie Cantor as Harry. Pamela Baird as Nancy.
12	12	"Uncle Bentley Loans Out Peter"	Jerry Hopper	Arthur Alsberg & Nate Monaster	February 16, 1958
Bentley is dating Liza Lane, a stage actress, who is about to do her first motion picture. She is a little afraid of that, plus she is moving from a hotel to her new house. Liza asks Bentley if she could borrow Peter for a couple of days to make the adjustment. Bentley reluctantly agrees. Peter is not thrilled about the idea. He knows that Bentley and Kelly will be lost without him. Especially with Kelly cooking. After two days, everyone is glad to have Peter back and Bentley says he will never lend him out again. However, because of a situation Bentley can't get out of, he is talked into lending Peter to Liza again. When at Liza's, Peter says he won't go back and lets it slip that Bentley has a date with a Linda Donnally. When Peter realizes what he said, he tries to tell Liza that Linda is an old woman and a client of Bentley's. Liza is furious and has a plan to get back at Bentley for his lies. She hires a clumsy butler named Henry (Vince Barnett) for Bentley to sabotage his dinner date with Linda. Later that evening, Liza comes by to gloat. Jackie Kelk as Jerry.
13	13	"Bentley and the Social Worker"	Jerry Hopper	Arthur Alsberg & Nate Monaster	March 2, 1958
Bentley wants Kelly to love him, so he has a hard time disciplining her. He asks his friend Phil Corey's advice. Phil says Bentley should become Kelly's legal guardian, then he wouldn't feel so guilty. Judge Ruddick (Leslie Bradley) tells Bentley that because of his bachelor status, he must first undergo an investigation by a social worker. While there, Ruddick catches Bentley eyeing his secretary (Larri Thomas). Kelly is thrilled about the idea of Bentley gaining guardianship. She agrees to do whatever she can to impress the social worker. Days pass and no one comes by. Myra Carter (Joyce Meadows), the social worker, finally arrives. After Myra leaves, Bentley is sure he passed the inspection. He celebrates by having a poker game with his friends. During the game, Myra returns, as she left her notebook there. Bentley walks into the room carrying a bunch of beers and is surprised to see Myra. Bentley goes to see Myra the next morning at her office, to try and explain things. Myra tells him that he will be awarded guardianship. Bentley invites her to dinner at the house that evening to celebrate. Kathleen Case as Marge Barkman. Hal Riddle as Frank.
14	14	"A Sister for Kelly"	Andrew McCullough	Arthur Alsberg & Nate Monaster	March 16, 1958
Bentley laments how many of his friends are always trying to get him married. Kelly and Ginger plot to have Bentley and Ginger's mom meet, fall in love, and get married. Then they could be sisters. For several days Bentley knows that Kelly is trying to set him up with someone, but he doesn't know who. That is until he goes to a restaurant with Kelly and sees Ginger's mother Louise Farrell (Catherine McLeod) there. He finds out that Louise also knows what the girl's plan is. Bentley and Louise play along for the evening. Bentley does date Louise several times. Ginger overhears her mother tell a friend she expects to be married very soon. Ginger tells Kelly, who tells Peter, who then tells Bentley. Peter lets Kelly know in a subtle way that Bentley doesn't love Louise. Bentley wants to find a way to let Louise know he's not interested in marriage. Turns out Louise has a man in New York she is interested in. The girls now try to break up Bentley and Louise, only to happily find out there are no marriage plans. Leon Belasco as Violinist. Frank Richards as Mechanic. William Bakewell as Man #1. Stanley Farrar as Man #3.
15	15	"Waiting Up for Kelly"	Jerry Hopper	Phil Leslie	March 30, 1958
Kelly has a date to go to a party with a boy named Jack Corey. Bentley's a little concerned and tries to talk to her about how to act with a boy. He asks her to be home on time. Bentley was going to go out on a date with Laura Logan (Penny Edwards), but decides to stay at the house with her. All Bentley can do is mention Kelly. Bentley starts to panic when Kelly is late. Bentley and Laura drive over to Jack's house. Bentley talks with his father, Matt Corey (Whit Bissell). He finds out that Jack has been home for a while. Jack says that Kelly left early with the Rymer twins. Bentley then goes to what he thinks is the Rymer home. It turns out to be the home of a Marcia Sutherlee (Frances Bergen). With Laura sleeping in the car, Bentley finally finds the Rymer house and speaks with the housekeeper (Hope Summers). She says the family left for Palm Springs. Bentley goes home to look for an address book and finds Kelly in her bed. She apparently got into the house through her bedroom window without anyone noticing. Bentley winds up getting a date with Marcia. Kathryn Card as Mrs. Logan.
16	16	"Woman of the House"	Andrew McCullough	Arthur Alsberg & Nate Monaster	April 13, 1958
Kelly feels that she is now old enough to be treated as the woman of the house. Bentley promises Kelly that from now on she will be included in all the household decisions. Kelly starts to make some changes in the house and even tells a Door-to-Door Salesman (Jack Albertson) that she is not interested in his product. Peter pretends that he feels as if he's not needed anymore, in order to get a favor from Bentley. Ronnie Burns comes by Bentley's office to discuss a contract. Bentley invites him over for dinner. After remembering that Peter is out for the night, Bentley decides to take Ronnie to a restaurant. Meanwhile, Kelly's girlfriends vote to present a humanitarian award to their heartthrob Ronnie after tonight's dinner. Not knowing Bentley's change of plans, Kelly prepares the dinner for Ronnie and has a beautiful table set. When Bentley and Ronnie don't show up, Kelly is worried about what her friends will think when they come by. Peter comes home and finds Kelly crying. Peter saves the day by getting Ronnie to the house before the girls arrive. Bentley and Ronnie have to eat a second dinner and then toast the woman of the house.
17	17	"Peter Falls in Love"	Don Taylor	Arthur Alsberg & Nate Monaster	April 27, 1958
Spring is in the air, and Peter says he's in love with a girl named Suzy. Kelly tells Bentley about a boy at school named Howard that she really likes. Secretary Vicki shows Bentley her engagement ring. She tells him that her fiancé Herbert doesn't want her to work after they're married. Peter says he is now engaged and that Suzy wants him to learn a trade. That means he will have to leave Bentley. Kelly has been spending a lot of time with Howard. Feeling alone, Bentley gets a poker game going with some friends. During the game, Bentley finds out another one of his friends is getting married. Bentley is very distracted during the game. Bentley starts to think that maybe he needs to be with just one person and share the little things. He takes his date Barbara to a laundromat and then roller skating. Vicki tells Bentley that she has broken up with Herbert. Peter tells Bentley he's not getting married and will continue to work for him. The two tell Bentley he was right about having his freedom. Kelly tells Bentley she's not seeing Howard anymore. Bentley goes back to his old way of life. William Kendis as Jack. Joseph Mell as Petey. Molly Dodd as Woman at Laundromat.
18	18	"Bentley's Prospective Son-In-Law"	John Newland	Arthur Alsberg & Nate Monaster	May 11, 1958
Bentley's friend Bob tells him that his daughter is engaged. Bob came home one day and there the boy was. Bentley comes home to find Howard Meechim (Jimmy Boyd) in his house. Bentley gets a quick vision of Kelly and Howard getting married. Kelly tells Bentley and Peter that Howard is very nice and they'll grow to like him. Bentley tells Vickie that Howard has been at the house for the last 4 days. Vickie tells Bentley that if he's mean to Howard, Kelly will like him even more. Bentley should be nice to him and he'll be gone in no time. Bentley has beautiful Valerie Culpepper over for dinner. Howard shows up and ruins the romantic evening. Kelly tells Ginger that at first she spent time with Howard because she felt sorry for him. Kelly now thinks Howard is like a son to Bentley. Bentley decides to try and teach Howard how to get another girl. Kelly is going to the dance with Steve Berry (Tony Epper). She tells Bentley she's only been seeing Howard because Bentley likes him. At the dance, Bentley's lessons work as Howard is dancing with several girls. Bentley's plan backfires when Kelly wants to get Howard back for her and Bentley's sake. Bentley meets Howard's beautiful older sister (Carole Wells), who thanks Bentley for spending time with him.
19	19	"Bentley's Clubhouse"	David Butler	Arthur Alsberg & Nate Monaster	May 25, 1958
All of Kelly's friends like hanging out at Bentley's house because he doesn't nag at them the way their parents do. Suddenly, none of the girls are showing up and Kelly wonders if she did something wrong. Peter finds out that the other mothers don't want their daughters going to Bentley's house. Because of his free and easy lifestyle, they can no longer discipline their daughters. Vickie thinks Bentley should have some of the mothers over to talk to them. Bentley sweet talks the three mothers that show up and they agree to come back the next day to talk some more. The next day Bentley comes home to a house full of mothers. Peter even had to hire a friend to help him serve the women. Now the husbands are upset about their wives hanging out at Bentley's house. Bentley talks to two of the husbands at his office. It doesn't help Bentley's case when beautiful Miss Landers (Carole Wells) comes in and gives Bentley a kiss. However, the next day his house is full with the husbands. Some of the wives come by, but everything works out. It's not long before Kelly's girlfriends are back. Karl Swenson as Charley Burton. Joan Tompkins as Fran Burton. Sondra Rodgers as Ellie Markum. Shirley Mitchell as Gladys Peterson. Bess Flowers as Wife.
20	20	"Uncle Bentley and the Matchmaker"	Jerry Hopper	Arthur Alsberg & Nate Monaster	June 8, 1958
Bentley's friend Joe Browning (Tommy Farrell) married Irene (Mary Lawrence) six months ago. Since then, Irene has been trying to find a girl for Bentley to marry. Real estate man Ken Townsley (Gavin Gordon) tells Bentley that his neighbors are leasing their house again while they go to Europe. Young and beautiful Laurie (Sally Fraser) moves in next door and Kelly says she really likes her. Bentley is worried that Laurie will come over all the time and ruin his other dates. But curiosity gets the best of him, and Bentley visits her first. He finds Laurie with a man named Jeff Stebbens and leaves quickly. The next time Bentley drops by, he finds her with a man named Frank Gibbs (Charles Gray). Bentley asks Laurie to dinner, but she says they should just be friends. Turns out Laurie is a friend of Irene's, who has been having Laurie play hard to get on purpose. Laurie goes on several dates with Bentley, but Irene still has her remain indifferent. Bentley begins to suspect that this is all part of a trap and ends it with Laurie. Kelly finds out that Laurie moved away to marry Jeff. Irene continues plotting to get Bentley married. Judd Holdren as Eric. Hallene Hill as Mrs. Mitchell.

=== Season 2 (1958–59) ===
No. overall	No. in season	Title	Directed by	Written by	Original release date
21	1	"Bentley and the Finishing School"	John Newland	Arthur Alsberg & Nate Monaster	September 14, 1958
Bentley is concerned with the way Kelly is growing up. Bentley's friend Phil Corey (Bartlett Robinson) brings his daughter Julie to the office and she is so well-behaved. Phil says Julie is just back from finishing school and maybe Bentley should consider sending Kelly. Bentley feels he would miss Kelly too much. Back at home, Bentley tells Kelly she needs to start behaving better. Phil drops off a brochure from the school when Bentley's not home. Kelly starts to think maybe she should go because she thinks she's causing a lot of trouble around the house. Kelly leaves for the school and already Peter and Bentley miss her. As the days go by, they miss her even more. After something Peter says, Bentley daydreams that Kelly is being treated as if in prison. He phones Mrs. Marquand (Florida Friebus), from the school, and they agree to send Kelly home for the weekend. Believing it is what Bentley wants, Kelly acts all prim and proper. With the help of Peter, Bentley and Kelly realize they like things back the way they used to be. Shirley Mitchell as Kitty Deveraux. Jimmy Boyd as Howard Meechim. Jack Albertson as Charlie Sharpe. Jean Carson as Winnie Sharpe.
22	2	"Parent's Night"	John Newland	Jerry Davis & Alfred Lewis Levitt*	September 28, 1958
Kelly is buttering up Bentley and there must be a reason. It comes out that she promised her teacher Miss Conklin (Sondra Rodgers) that Bentley would perform in the 'Parents Night' play. Bentley tells Kelly he's busy but agrees to go to the meeting about the play that evening. He changes his mind about participating and gets up to leave. That is until he learns that the director and leading lady is a famous beautiful actress named Diane Webster (Joanna Moore). Bentley doesn't make a good first impression on Diane. The next morning, another misunderstanding doesn't help the way Diane feels about Bentley. She casts him in a one-line part. During the first rehearsal, Bentley quits. Bentley learns that secretary Kitty did something that didn't help his position with Diane. He tries to apologize to Diane but she wants nothing to do with him. The night of the play, Bentley is in the audience when he is asked to come backstage. It turns out that Charley Burton (Karl Swenson), who had the lead role, has stage fright and can't go on. Diane asks Bentley to fill in, which he does. The play goes well and Bentley even gets a date with Diane.
23	3	"Bentley Leads a Dog's Life"	John Newland	Teleplay by: Arthur Alsberg & Ben Starr; Story by: Arthur Alsberg & Nate Monaster	October 12, 1958
Jasper has chewed up one of Bentley's ties and he says he'd be happy to get rid of the dog. Kelly is going away for the weekend with a friend and Peter is going away for his grandmother's birthday. Bentley suddenly gets an urge to go to Ensenada. The family realizes there will be no one to take care of Jasper. Kelly says she's willing to stay home. Despite Kelly's concern, Bentley says they will take Jasper to a dog motel. At the dog motel, Dr. Sperber (Howard McNear) has a hard time getting Jasper into a cage. Bentley will postpone leaving for his trip so Sperber can pick up Jasper the next morning and try again. It takes a little doing, but Sperber finally catches Jasper. At the airport, Bentley and Peter start to feel guilty about leaving Jasper. Not knowing what the other is doing, both cancel their plans and go home. The two startle each other at the house. When Bentley and Peter go to the dog motel, Jasper is gone. They search for Jasper and are worried about what they'll tell Kelly. When they get home, somehow Jasper is there. Bentley and Peter don't let Kelly know that they gave up their trips for the dog. Gavin Gordon as Man with Dog. Olan Soule as Airport Attendant.
24	4	"Bentley and the Teenage Siren"	John Newland	Arthur Alsberg & Nate Monaster	October 26, 1958
Kelly goes to a school dance and has a miserable time. It seems beautiful new girl Valerie Swanson (Jenny Maxwell) had all the boys fawning over her. Kelly now feels plain and unattractive. Bentley takes Kelly out to dinner to try and cheer her up. His talk about inner beauty backfires when several flashy women stop by to talk to him in front of Kelly. Bentley's new plan is to pay a bunch of boys to dance with Kelly at the next school dance. Kelly says she hates Valerie and is not going to the dance. While at the golf club, Bentley runs into Charlie Swanson (Frank Albertson), who he finds out is Valerie's father. Charlie tells Bentley that all the girls at school give Valerie the cold shoulder and she is envious of Kelly because she is so popular. Something Bentley says makes Kelly decide to speak to Valerie. Kelly and Valerie arrive at the dance together as friends. Bernadette Withers as Ginger Farrell.
25	5	"Bentley & Peter's Teacher"	Sidney Lanfield	Arthur Alsberg & Nate Monaster	November 9, 1958
Bentley has a hard time reading Peter's messages. He suggests Peter take a class in English composition. Peter at first doesn't want to go, but Kelly talks him into it. Peter leaves the house a bit of a mess hoping Bentley will ask him to quit school. Peter starts to enjoy night school and his teacher, Miss Cutler (Elisabeth Fraser). He even signs up for other courses. Peter thanks Bentley for suggesting he go to school. Peter starts telling Bentley's friends and dates that everyone should acquire more knowledge. Bentley begins to regret suggesting Peter go to school. Peter invites Miss Cutler to the house and Bentley says he has a few things to tell her. When she arrives, Bentley instantly finds her attractive. He tries to impress her with his knowledge of things, but he makes a lot of mistakes. Bentley then tells her that there is more than just book learning. Miss Cutler manages to embarrass Bentley and show him he's not quite right and it's good for Peter to learn. Bentley finds a way to make amends with Miss Cutler.
26	6	"Bentley and the Wedding Bells"	Sidney Miller	Arthur Alsberg & Nate Monaster	November 23, 1958
Ever since Bentley acquired wealthy client Ruby Polk (Elvia Allman), he was afraid she would try to find a woman for him to marry. Ruby's husband Melvin (Joseph Mell) begs Bentley to come over and meet Ruby's niece, Lucille Barlow (Jane Withers). Bentley goes to Ruby's house and sees a beautiful woman there and thinks she is Lucille. It turns out the woman is Miss Shaw, a decorator. Bentley meets Lucille. She's not particularly attractive and is a treasure trove of facts and opinions. The next night when Bentley has another date, Ruby brings over Lucille. Bentley's friend from the office, Dave Adams (Robert Nichols), drops by. He's a bit of a bookworm himself and he and Lucille instantly hit it off. Bentley tells Melvin how well Dave and Lucille got along. Melvin knows that Ruby wants Lucille to be with Bentley. Ruby still has Bentley date Lucille, but after he picks her up, he drops her off at Dave's. After the two date for a while, Bentley comes up with a plan to get the couple married. Things get a little hectic when Ruby shows up before the ceremony is completed. Ruby now wants to set Bentley up with Lucille's cousin Agatha.
27	7	"Kelly's Mad Crush"	John Newland	Arthur Alsberg & Ben Starr	December 7, 1958
Bentley is meeting Ronnie Burns at his office about a contract. Kelly would like Bentley to get Ronnie's autographs for all the girls in her club. When Ronnie arrives at Bentley's office, he's a bundle of nerves. Ronnie tells Bentley that a woman named Lorraine (Jana Lund), whom he took out twice, is now tailing him everywhere. She is an acrobat with a big partner named Fred and wants a screen test. Bentley suggests that to take his mind off of Lorraine, Ronnie should go out to dinner with him and Kelly. Kelly is thrilled when Ronnie calls her about dinner. At the restaurant, they spot Lorraine with Fred. Bentley and Ronnie try to prevent Lorraine from seeing him. Bentley's date, Susan, wants to dance. Kelly and Ronnie are alone at the table. While he's still trying to avoid being seen, Kelly believes Ronnie is in trouble and that he is confiding in her. Kelly tells Ginger she thinks Ronnie has a crush on her. Kelly tells Howard that she can't see him anymore. For the next few days all Kelly can do is think about Ronnie. She gets depressed when Ronnie doesn't call her. Bentley tries to boost Howard's confidence hoping he can get Ronnie off Kelly's mind. Howard confronts Ronnie outside of Bentley's house and hits him in the eye. Things come to a head when Lorraine and Fred show up.
28	8	"Bentley's Big Case"	John Newland	Arthur Alsberg & Nate Monaster	December 21, 1958
Peter buys his first car and he's very proud of it. Peter spends a lot of time working on the car and it's effecting his work in the house. Meanwhile, Kelly would like to have a girl named Emily join the club. All the other girls are against Emily. Kelly is afraid to push for Emily because Kelly is running for president of the club. Bentley gives her some advice. Peter is in a fender-bender with his car and wants Bentley to handle the case. Because the insurance company is willing to pay for the damage, Bentley doesn't want to take the case. Peter gets another lawyer. Wealthy client Arthur Fletcher (Joe DeRita) comes to see Bentley. Seems his wife Florence (Veda Ann Borg) got into an accident and he would like Bentley to look into it. Bentley finds out the other car was Peters. Kelly tells Bentley that she stuck up for Emily, but she thinks it cost her the election. Peter finds out that Bentley is the other party's lawyer. Bentley tries to get Peter to settle, but he won't. Bentley is stuck in the middle as Florence wants the case settled quickly. Kelly says that the club accepted Emily and Kelly was made president. At court, Peter decides to represent himself. Bentley works it out so both parties are satisfied. Robert Carson as Judge Stennis. Olan Soule as Bailiff.
29	9	"Bentley's Economy Wave"	John Newland	Arthur Alsberg & Nate Monaster	January 4, 1959
It's the first of the month and Bentley can't believe all the bills he has. Bentley decides to tighten the belt, both at home and in the office. Potential client Mr. Haris (Richard Deacon) drops by Bentley's office. He's looking for a top notch lawyer that thinks big and is not afraid to spend some money. He wants to see if Bentley meets the grade. Kelly tells Howard that something must be wrong that Bentley is so worried about money. Bentley finds out that Kelly is making her own dress. Bentley invites Haris and his friend Eve Carter over for dinner. To Bentley's embarrassment, Peter serves a really cheap meal. The embarrassment continues when Howard comes by to give Bentley some of his father's old clothes. Haris' partner Sam L. Clevinger (Irving Bacon) arrives in town and wants a lawyer that has respect for a dollar. Haris, now thinking that Bentley is a penny pincher, still recommends him. Bentley meets Clevinger and Sam talks about saving money. Haris and Clevinger come to dinner at Bentley's house. This time Peter puts out a large extravagant dinner. Peter even hired extra houseboys and a Japanese band. Clevinger thinks Bentley has no concept of frugality and leaves. Johnny Silver as Charlie. Spencer Chan as Band Member.
30	10	"Decisions, Decisions"	John Newland	Teleplay by: Jerry Davis & Alfred Lewis Levitt*; Story by: Bill Freedman & Larry Rhine	January 18, 1959
It seems that no matter which way Bentley turns, everyone he knows wants him to make a decision for them. Peter wants to know if he should invest in the stock market. Kelly wants help deciding which boy to go to the prom with. Bentley wants them to decide for themselves. Bentley's friend Charlie Burton doesn't know if he should drop a case or not. If Charlie makes a wrong decision, it could effect whether his daughter gets a date to the prom. Bentley thinks he may be able to help. Secretary Kitty doesn't know which dress to buy. Everyone of Bentley's suggestions to his friends backfires on him. Kelly winds up with no date. Charlie will take his case to another lawyer. The stocks Peter didn't buy all go up. While on his date with Diana Rogers (Ann McCrea), she asks his advice on something. Bentley is now afraid to make any decisions. In the end, however, Bentley's decisions wind up working for the best. Joel Crothers as Richard. Phil Arnold as Armond.
31	11	"Bentley and the Kleptomaniac"	John Newland	Laurence Marks & Milton Pascal	February 1, 1959
Kelly feels Bentley is spending too much time worrying about her and helping her with things. She misses out on social events with her friends because Bentley takes her out. He tries to help Kelly with her homework even though he doesn't know what he's doing. Kelly and Ginger concoct a scheme to make him worry about Howard, instead. Kelly tells Bentley that Howard is a kleptomaniac. At first he refuses, but Kelly convinces Howard to go along with the plan. While Bentley talks to Howard, he witnesses him taking several things from the house. Bentley decides to speak with Howard's older sister Elaine (Joan Vohs). She has a hard time believing Bentley and thinks they should confront Howard. When they get to Bentley's house, all the things that Howard took are back again. Elaine now thinks Bentley was making things up. Kelly and Howard confess to Bentley and Elaine and Kelly explains the reason they did it. Bentley understands and will give Kelly more freedom. Bentley winds up taking Elaine out.
32	12	"A Phone for Kelly"	Bretaigne Windust	Arthur Alsberg & Ben Starr	February 15, 1959
Bentley, Peter and Kelly always seem to need to use the phone at the same time. Peter and Kelly want to ask Bentley for a second phone and put a plan into action. Bentley turns Kelly down. While shopping with Kelly, Bentley runs into Susan Carver (Paula Raymond), a woman he dated years ago. They stopped dating because Susan believed that the fates were against them. Bentley makes a disparaging remark about the store and then finds out that Susan owes the store. Bentley wants to make it up to her and Susan tells him to call her later. When Bentley is supposed to call her, Kelly and Peter have the phone tied up. Things fall through for Bentley's evening with Susan. An upset Bentley now places restrictions on the use of the phone. Bentley finally has Susan over for a romantic dinner. Ginger comes by to talk to Kelly, who isn't there. Ginger couldn't call because her father wouldn't let her use the phone. Then Helen shows up because she couldn't use the phone. Bentley suggests one should work to pay for another phone. Kelly and her girlfriends get jobs selling door to door. The fathers regret telling their daughters to pay for a phone. Bentley gives in and gets a second phone. Now Kelly gets calls on both phones. John Eldredge as Herb.
33	13	"Bentley, the Star Maker"	John Newland	Arthur Alsberg & Nate Monaster	March 1, 1959
Teen singing star Tommy Boone is a client of Bentley's. All the girls are excited that Bentley got Tommy to do a performance in town. Kelly tells Howard it's too bad he can't sing in front of people or he could be a star as well. While on a date with Howard's sister Elaine, Bentley gets a call from Peter telling him that Tommy had to cancel. Bentley tells Kelly about Tommy and she is devastated. Bentley hears Howard singing and playing guitar. Kelly tells Bentley that Howard is afraid to sing in front of people. Bentley thinks he can groom Howard into a teen star by the night of the show. To give Howard confindence, Bentley has some of Kelly's girlfriends pretend to swoon and faint when Howard sings. Bentley is surprised when the girls tell him they actually enjoyed Howard's singing. At the show, Howard initially freezes but then is a huge success. Howard has many more performances and he gets quite a following of fans. Elaine is furious with Bentley as she wanted Howard to pursue science. Bentley has a talk with Howard and Howard decides to give up music. Howard gives his final performance.
34	14	"Bentley the Proud Father"	Earl Bellamy	Arthur Alsberg & Ben Starr	March 15, 1959
Kelly asks Bentley be on the school carnival committee, but he says no. But after something that Ginger says, Bentley winds up going to the meeting. At the committee meeting, Bentley hopes it will be as short as possible. But then Bentley meets the beautiful chairman Patricia Pierce and he doesn't mind staying. Meanwhile, Kelly loses boyfriend Steve to Gloria Gibson (Cheryl Holdridge). Bentley feels Kelly needs to be more bubbly and out-going around boys. Peter thinks she's fine as she is. Kelly says that her and Gloria have two different personalities. Things don't go well when Kelly tries to be more bubbly the next time she sees Steve. At the next committee meeting, Frank Gibson (Whit Bissell), Gloria's father, suggests that the girl whose father's booth sells the most tickets, be made Queen of the carnival. Bentley wasn't going to run a booth, but now he will. Frank and Bentley each think their booths sold the most tickets. Their competition gets out of hand when they both try to out do each other at Gingers booth. This causes Ginger to sell the most tickets and become Carnival Queen. After the carnival, Steve offers to drive Kelly home if she promises to be herself.
35	15	"Bentley's Aunt Caroline"	John Newland	Arthur Alsberg & Ben Starr	March 29, 1959
Bentley is practicing his speech to the PTA about guiding a teanager while waiting for Kelly to come home. Kelly is out on a date with Tom and Bentley worries she may be growing up too fast. Bentley also thinks Kelly doesn't confide in him anymore. He remembers his Aunt Caroline (Lurene Tuttle) and how, whenever he had a problem, he could talk to her. Bentley decides Kelly could use Aunt Caroline around for a while. As they're preparing for Caroline's arrival, Peter lets it slip that she's coming to straighten out Kelly. When she arrives, she is not the motherly type Bentley remembered. Caroline is now the fast-paced jet-setting type. Caroline dresses Kelly up in a sexy dress and does her makeup. She shows Kelly how to call Tom for a date. Caroline even gets Peter to act differently. Fred Grant and Nancy Armstrong from the PTA drop by to discuss the speech he is to give. Bentley is embarrassed by the way Caroline and Kelly are acting. She also invited Mei Lan and Bessie Lu for Peter. Bentley wants to find a way to get Caroline out of the house. Secretary Vicki comes up with a suggestion for Bentley. The plan almost backfires when he finds out Caroline already had plans to leave. Fred and Kelly help save the day.
36	16	"Bentley, Man of Steel"	Earl Bellamy	Jerry Davis & Alfred Lewis Levitt*	April 12, 1959
Kelly is worried about the hours Bentley keeps and that he's not getting enough exercise. She thinks he should join a gym, which Bentley is against. After Peter's suggestion, Kelly calls Amanda Armstrong (Mari Aldon) of the Armstrong Method Health Club. Chuck Forrest is at Bentley's office. Amanda stops by and after seeing how attractive she is, Bentley claims he's interested in joining the club. Chuck is interested as well. Bentley invites Amanda to his home that evening. He tries to trick her into thinking he's quite strong, but she figures out what he's doing. Bentley brings Amanda home and meets her father, Mr. Armstrong (William Newell), who is in excellent shape for his age. Bentley tries to make out that he's in great shape, but that doesn't work too well. Bentley and Chuck both join the club and both make plays for Amanda. Because of the healthy food they now have to eat, Peter and Kelly begin to regret Bentley joining the club. Peter says he's leaving, but Kelly talks him into staying. They plot to get Bentley to quit. Bentley is wearing himself down and winds up getting a cold. Bentley is tired of eating the health food. He has a delivery boy bring him some deli sandwiches which he tries to hide. Bentley lets Peter and Kelly know he is tired of the club and the food.
37	17	"Bentley and the Motorcycle"	Don Taylor	Arthur Alsberg & Ben Starr	April 26, 1959
Howard is helping Kelly with her Algebra. All she can think of is the dance the next night. Ginger comes by and tells Kelly that she is now going steady with Roy. Kelly hopes to be the next girl to go steady. Howard asks Bentley if he could go steady with Kelly. Bentley believes Kelly is too young for that. Bentley has a run-in with a young motorcyclist named Mike Brinkerhoff (Dick Kallman). He would hate to see Kelly wind up with someone like Mike. Bentley gives Howard permission to go steady with Kelly. But after the dance, Howard tells Bentley that Kelly is going steady with Mike. Things don't go well when Howard tries to help Bentley find Mike. Kelly gets upset when Bentley tells her she can't go steady with Mike. Bentley and Peter go to talk with Mike and tell him to stay away from Kelly. They find out that Mike is actually a very nice guy. Now Bentley wants to buy a motorcycle. Kelly tells Bentley that she broke up with Mike because all he can talk about is motorcycles. Hoping to impress Kelly, Howard gets a motorcycle. She's not interested, but Bentley and Peter are.
38	18	"Bentley, the Organizer"	Don Taylor	Arthur Alsberg & Ben Starr	May 10, 1959
Bentley has a trial in New York that could last up to 6 months. He'll be taking Peter and Kelly with him. Bentley starts talking to real estate agents about renting the house. Bentley tells Peter and Kelly how organized he is and they should do the same. Bentley meets agent Anne Gordon. She brings the Carters to see the house. Bentley needs to get the Plumber (George Cisar) and the Painter (Frank Sully) out of the house. Harry Carter (Jess Kirkpatrick) wants to get a glass of water from the kitchen sink and gets a face full of water. Bentley does wind up leasing the home to the Carters. Then he gets a call that the trial unexpectedly settled out of court. Bentley speaks to Anne and believes that everything will be straightened out with the Carters. Bentley finds Harry in the bedroom. He didn't know about the deal being canceled. Lillian Carter's brother Fred (Gene Saks) comes by and thinks Bentley is the butler. Lillian and Harry come back. Bentley learns from Anne that she couldn't reach the Carter's and they're moving in. Bentley finds an elaborate way to have the Carters break their lease.
39	19	"Bentley and the Beauty Contest"	Bretaigne Windust	Teleplay by: Jerry Davis; Story by: Ben Starr & Arthur Alsberg	May 24, 1959
Kelly is reluctantly practicing the cello for a school concert. Chuck Forest comes by with Giselle Lambert (Corinne Cole), who happens to be Miss Saskatchewan in an upcoming Miss Galaxy beauty pageant. Chuck would like Bentley to be a judge and help Giselle win the pageant. After meeting her, Bentley would like to help Alicia Dominguez (Suzanne Lloyd), Miss Lima, instead. Alicia's chaperone, Carmelita Espenoza, does present a problem for Bentley. Bentley is having a hard time finding something for Alicia to do for the talent portion of the contest. After Kelly brings home a trumpet, Bentley learns that Alicia can play. He suggests she play a song for the contest. At the pageant, Chuck sabotages Alicia's trumpet and her performance goes badly. Bentley realizes what happened and then sabotages Giselle's singing performance. Alicia gets another chance to play and Chuck once again tries to sabotage the performance. However, Bentley stops him this time. Alicia winds up winning the pageant. Alicia's father, Carlos Dominguez (Edward Colmans), tries to explain to Bentley that Alicia is spoken for. Bentley thinks Carlos is just an actor that Chuck sent. Alicia comes by and Bentley realizes that Carlos is really her father. In the end, Alicia decides to go back home instead of staying with Bentley.
40	20	"Bentley, the Hero"	Don Taylor	Arthur Alsberg & Ben Starr	June 7, 1959
It's Saturday morning and Bentley is trying to sleep in. Kelly and Peter keep waking him up. They are once again making sandwiches for Kelly's friends to take to the beach. Bentley thinks Kelly is being taken advantage of by her girlfriends. Bentley then learns that Kelly has committed him to taking her friends to the beach. Meanwhile, Bentley is also putting together a movie deal with Mr. Saunders (Ralph Dumke), a producer. At the beach, Carol Stewart, an aspiring young actress, fakes a drowning in order to meet Bentley. Bentley saves her and now Kelly and her friends think Bentley is a hero. Carol comes by the house to thank Bentley and she puts on a big act about her growing up in an orphanage. Bentley figures out that she staged the whole thing to get a part in the film. Peter and Kelly are disappointed with Bentley when Carol leaves the house crying. Bentley tries to explain to everyone that Carol faked the whole thing. Later, Carol pulls the same stunt at Saunders beach house and he goes out and saves her. But, Bentley is there and tells Saunders it was all fake. Carol apologizes and leaves. Both Saunders and Bentley wind up wanting to give Carol a part in the movie.

* Because of the Hollywood Blacklist, Alfred Lewis Levitt was credited as "Tom August".

=== Season 3 (1959–60) ===
No. overall	No. in season	Title	Directed by	Written by	Original release date
41	1	"Peter Meets His Match"	Sidney Lanfield	Seaman Jacobs & Si Rose	September 17, 1959
Peter has been very distracted lately. Peter tells Bentley that he's in love with a woman named Linda Toy (Lisa Lu). She works in the vegetable department at the supermarket. But, she is popular and Peter feels he has a lot of competition. Bentley tries to give him some advice on how to stand out from the others. Amanda Armstrong (Mari Aldon), Asst. Troop Leader of Kelly's scouts, comes by. He asks her to dinner for that evening, but she says she has other plans. She agrees to come over the next night. Bentley tells Peter to pay attention to what he does on the date and try that with Linda. Kelly tells Peter he shouldn't try to be like Bentley, he should be himself. Kelly tells Amanda what Bentley is going to do. At the date, Bentley woos Amanda and, knowing what he's doing, says she accepts his proposal. Bentley panics, but she tells him she knew what he was up to. Peter tells Bentley he plans to propose to Linda. Peter tries to ask Linda, but gets tongue tied. He does get a date with her though. Peter feels bad that he'll be leaving Bentley and Kelly. He gets his Cousin Frank (James Hong) as a replacement. Peter introduces Frank to Linda and they hit it off right away. Peter tells Bentley that he's staying as their house boy and that Linda is out with Frank.
42	2	"Bentley and the Dog Trainer"	Bretaigne Windust	Everett Freeman & William Raynor	September 24, 1959
Bentley is trying to get a contract done for Chuck Forrest, but he keeps getting interrupted. Apparently Jasper has been stealing and hiding items around the house. Peter and Kelly keep questioning Jasper. Bentley is then sued by Minerva Witherspoon (Carol Ohmart), a neighbor whose garden was damaged by Jasper. He goes to speak with Minerva and discovers she is quite beautiful. She suggests that he send Jasper to a dog obedience training school. When Bentley tells her that he is against sending the dog to a school, Minerva says she will see him in court. After the contract Bentley was working on goes missing, he thinks Jasper took it. Bentley changes his mind and enrolls Jasper in Mr. Cartwright's (Howard McNear) obedience school. Peter questions Bentley spending $10 for a dog whistle. That night, Bentley blows the whistle and his backyard fills up with dogs. Minerva comes by because her dog Plato ran to Bentley's house. They retrieve Plato and Bentley walks Minerva home. He tells her Jasper is in obedience school. But then Jasper walks by with a mouth full of Minerva's flowers. Bentley tries working with Jasper and the whistle, but he doesn't seem to be getting anywhere. Peter finds out that he accidentally misplaced Bentley's contract. Peter gives the contract to Jasper to return to Bentley. Jasper is back in good graces and Minerva has a little fun with the dog whistle.
43	3	"The Case Against Gisele"	Sidney Lanfield	Seaman Jacobs & Si Rose	October 1, 1959
Singing star Gisele MacKenzie is Bentley's new client. Peter shows Bentley a newspaper article where a pianist was awarded a large amount of money for an injured finger. Meanwhile, Kelly's birthday party is coming up. But, Ginger has come down with the chicken pox and the girls have a pact that neither can have a party if the other can't make it. To cheer her up, Bentley will introduce Kelly to Gisele. Peter goes along as well and keeps interrupting Gisele's film shoot. He also trips over a wire on the ground. Peter's Cousin Charlie says that he should sue for damages. Bentley does not really believe Peter is hurt that badly. Bentley and Gisele come up with a plan so that Kelly can still have a birthday party and Peter gives up his idea of a lawsuit.
44	4	"Bentley and the Gullible Guitarist"	Sidney Lanfield	Bob Fisher & Alan Lipscott	October 8, 1959
Friday night is Peter's night off and he usually goes bowling. Kelly manipulates him into staying home and providing food for a party she's giving that night. She then manipulates Bentley into providing a local band for entertainment. Once he realizes that he's been out-foxed, Bentley tells Kelly he won't get the band and she needs to stop using people. Despite what Bentley said, Kelly manipulates Howard into providing the live music for the party. The night of the party, Howard plays his guitar all night and doesn't get to dance with Kelly. Bentley tells Howard he's been used and the two of them come up with a plan to teach Kelly a lesson.
45	5	"Kelly's Idol"	Bretaigne Windust	Laurence Marks & William Raynor	October 15, 1959
Kelly tells Bentley that she wishes Howard were more mature and sophisticated. She wishes Howard were more like Bentley. Kelly and Howard are going to a dance that evening. Howard comes by all dressed up. He asks Bentley what things he should talk about with Kelly on their date. The next morning Kelly tells Bentley she met a great guy named Jimmie Martin. She says he's a little rough around the edges, but she can mold him into something more like Bentley. Jimmie comes by and meets Bentley and Peter. While there, Kelly already tries to make some changes to Jimmie. Meanwhile, Bentley has a date with Louise Carson (Connie Hines). All she can do is talk about how great her dad was. Bentley has a miserable time. Jimmie is being teased at school for dressing more mature. Jimmie complains to Bentley that Kelly is forcing him to be like Bentley. Bentley tells Jimmie to be himself. At a party, Jimmie meets Barbara Kaylor, who also thinks he should be himself. Kelly thinks Jimmie is picking her up to go to school. Howard comes by and tells her that Jimmie is now seeing Barbara. She learns that one shouldn't try to change people. Bentley almost makes the same mistake Kelly did with his date Alice (Donna Douglas).
46	6	"East Meets West"	Sidney Lanfield	Jerry Davis & David R. Schwartz	October 22, 1959
Peter is addicted to his favorite TV western show starring Rock Randall (Bill Williams), who happens to be a client of Bentleys. Peter asks Bentley if he can have a TV in the kitchen so he can watch the show while he cooks. Bentley refuses. Peter keeps pressing Bentley for the TV. Kelly suggests to Bentley that they have Rock over for dinner and then Peter can see that he's really not a cowboy. Then maybe he'll give up on having a TV in the kitchen. Bentley goes to the set of Rock's show. Rock tells Bentley that his wife Helen is a bad cook and she's now on a health food kick. Helen wants a divorce if Rock doesn't eat her food. Bentley invites Rock to dinner. That evening, Rock is very impressed with Peter's cooking. Rock tells Bentley that he's going to try and lure Peter away from him. Bentley isn't worried. Later, Peter and Kelly are acting out a scene that Peter wrote for Rock's show. Peter tells Kelly he has a plan of his own. He hopes that if Bentley really thinks that he'll take the job at Rocks house, Bentley will buy a TV for the kitchen. Peter has packed his things and leaves. Kelly is very upset. In the end, Bentley gives in and buys the TV and Peter teaches Rocks wife how to cook. Jack Perrin as Crew Member.
47	7	"Bentley and Grandpa Ling"	Sidney Lanfield	Bob Fisher & Alan Lipscott	October 29, 1959
Kelly wants a surfboard, but Bentley says no. Peter learns that Grandpa Ling (Beal Wong) is coming for a visit. Peter tells Bentley that he doesn't want Grandpa Ling in the house. Apparently, if he sees something he likes, he takes it and leaves an item that he thinks is of equal value in its place. And Grandpa Ling isn't Peter's grandfather. He's not sure how Ling got in the family. Bentley meets Ling and he doesn't speak English. A Soldier (Read Morgan), that Ling hitched a ride with, comes back. He wants the medals Ling took from him. Bentley has Angela Lake (Helene Stanley) over for dinner. Judge Harvey Blandon and his wife Emily (Helene Heigh) make a surprise visit. Bentley needs the Judge's endorsement to run for City Council. Grandpa puts Bentley in an embarrassing position in front of the Judge. Bentley sets up a plan to get rid of Grandpa before a dinner party he wants to throw for the Judge. But the plan falls through and Grandpa puts Bentley in another embarrassing position, this time with the police. Apparently Ling stole a surfboard to give to Kelly. Bentley finds a way to get Grandpa out of trouble with Judge Blandon.
48	8	"Kelly: The Golddigger"	Norman Abbott	Mel Diamond & John Kohn	November 5, 1959
Kelly is dating a rich boy named Randy Maybrook. He's been sending her flowers three times a day. When Bentley meets Randy, all Randy can talk about is money. Kelly is also accepting all kinds of lavish gifts from Randy. Bentley tells her it isn't right to accept those gifts. Peter tells Bentley that Kelly is acting this way because Bentley has pretty much given her everything she wants. Bentley decides to show Kelly what it's like to live without a lot of money. He even pretends to have to let Peter go. Kelly is quite sad. But, his plan doesn't work out the way he had hoped. For his next plan, Bentley enlists the help of Randy's older sister, Sheila Maybrook (Bek Nelson). He gives Kelly the impression that he wants to marry Sheila for her money. Sheila knows Bentley's plan and plays along. This time Bentley convinces Kelly that one doesn't go out with someone for their money.
49	9	"The Rescue of Rufus"	Sidney Lanfield	Cynthia Lindsay & Leo Townsend	November 12, 1959
Danny Harmon has a dog named Rufus, who apparently bit a man named Mr. Talbot. Danny asks Kelly if Bentley will help defend Rufus. Kelly goes to see Bentley at his office. Kitty (Jane Nigh), Bentley's secretary, tells her he's very busy. The next morning Danny comes by again. Bentley apologizes to Kelly for being so busy. Kelly tells him about Danny's problem. Bentley says he can't defend a dog, but Peter shames him into taking the case. Kitty suggests that Bentley try and settle the case out of court. Talbot refuses to settle out of court. Meanwhile, Kelly learns that Kids Day at City Hall is on the same day that Bentley is in court with Talbot. Howard finds a way to make sure Kelly is in the courtroom. It's the day of the trial. Talbot gives his version of what happened and says he wants the dog destroyed. With the help of Peter and Danny, Talbot admits to lying about Rufus biting him. The Judge drops the case. Danny gives Bentley a lizard as a thank you present. Bill Erwin as Court Clerk. Paul De Rolf as a Boy.
50	10	"A Key for Kelly"	Sidney Lanfield	Bob Fisher & Alan Lipscott	November 19, 1959
Bentley is playing cards with Bert (Whit Bissell) and Amy Loomis (Florence MacMichael). Bentley is happily teamed up with niece Norma. Ginger comes by asking for her own house key and Bert refuses to give her one. Bentley agrees that the girls are too young. The next day, Kelly is going with Ginger to pick out a new dress. Bentley is a little disappointed as he used to go with Kelly. Kelly has a date with Kip Davis (Tommy Kirk), an older boy in prep school. They come home late and Kip offers to unlock the door for Kelly. Kelly has no key but pretends she forgot it. An embarrassed Kelly has to have Bentley let her in. Kelly tells Bentley that she should have her own key. Kip and Kelly have another date and the same thing happens. Not wanting to wake Bentley, Kip goes through an open window to let Kelly in. Bentley is there. An angry and humiliated Kelly once again asks for her own key. Kelly has Ginger show Bentley that she now has a key which Amy gave her. Later, Bentley experiences a similar embarrassing situation. He was on a date with Norma and she forgot her key. Bentley tries to sneak in through a window and runs into Bert. After a conversation with Kelly, he decides to give her a key to the house.
51	11	"Bentley's Double Play"	Sidney Lanfield	Bob Fisher & Alan Lipscott	November 26, 1959
Kelly is rehearsing for the Thanksgiving school play. Bentley tells her that he will not be able to direct the play as he did last year. He's just too busy. She tells him that Ginger's father will direct, which seems to bother Bentley quite a bit. Meanwhile, Peter suggests to his night school teacher Miss Gunther (Marianne Stewart) that the class have a Thanksgiving play. Peter volunteers Bentley to direct and provide the costumes and sets. When Peter tells Bentley, Bentley says he just doesn't have the time. Miss Gunther comes by to thank Bentley and he tells her he just can't do it. After she leaves, Bentley feels bad and tells Peter he'll do it. Peter is disappointed when Bentley doesn't cast him in the lead role opposite his friend Suzy Lee. Kelly is afraid she won't be ready for her play. Peter says he'll help coach her. At the office, Bentley is discussing a case with Mr. Worthington (Henry Hunter). Bentley is interrupted by calls from Peter and Miss Gunther about the play. It's the night of the plays and Kelly is scared and asks Bentley to be there. Bentley gets a call from Miss Gunther saying Luigi Vedecci (Mario Siletti), who has the lead role, has very bad stage fright. Bentley tells her Peter knows the part and will do it. Peter then panics. Kelly says that Bentley should go with Peter. Suzy manages to calm Peter down with a kiss. The play is a success. Jeanne Bates as Helga Jorgeson.
52	12	"Bentley and the Brainy Beauty"	Sidney Lanfield	Seaman Jacobs & Si Rose	December 3, 1959
Bentley and Chuck Forrest are on a double date with Rita (Sandra Giles) and Peggy. Bentley is surprised at the women's lack of intelligence. He then meets a smart attractive female attorney named Rhonda Wilson. The two are working on a case together and Bentley would like to draw out the work as long as possible. Rhonda at first is annoyed with Bentley's dragging things out. She is at Bentley's house when Chuck and the two women come by. Things gets worse when she finds out that the case could've been handled in a much shorter time. She leaves in a huff. The next day, Chuck tries to get Rhonda to take him on as a client. Bentley comes by and the men each vie for Rhonda's attention. Rhonda gets Chuck to leave. She tells Bentley that if he really applied himself, he could go much farther. Rhonda says he should be seen at the right places and with the right people. Bentley spends a lot of time with Rhonda going to events and meetings and giving speeches. Rhoda even thinks Bentley could have a career in politics. Bentley tells Kelly and Peter that they should apply themselves. Bentley is getting worn down. He comes up with a sneaky way of getting out of an event with Rhonda. Bentley eventually tires of all the seriousness and goes back to dating fun women. Sue Ane Langdon as Kitty Marsh, Bentley's secretary.
53	13	"Bentley Plays Cupid"	Sidney Lanfield	Jerry Davis & Howard Leeds	December 10, 1959
Bentley and Chuck are waiting to be seated at a restaurant. Chuck sees a beautiful woman walk in. He tells Bentley he suddenly remembered he has a band rehearsal. Chuck asks the Maître d' who the woman was and he says Nora Daley (Mari Blanchard). But when Chuck tries to find her, Bentley has already hooked up with her. Bentley notices that Secretary Kitty can't seem to stop eating. Bentley and Peter figure that Kitty over eats to compensate for being alone. Kitty comes by to drop off some papers. Bentley, Peter and Kelly try to make her feel extra welcome. But she wants to eat something. Chuck drops by. Bentley worries when bachelor Chuck drives Kitty home. The next day, Kitty gets upset when Bentley questions her about her and Chuck. Bentley doesn't want Kitty to get hurt, so he asks Chuck to not see her again. Chuck and Kitty continue to see each other. Kitty even stops over eating. Bentley comes up with a plan to have Chuck think that he is getting married. Then Chuck might decide to marry Kitty. Bentley's plan doesn't work the way he expected, but it does get Kitty to stop seeing Chuck.
54	14	"Kelly's Secret"	Bretaigne Windust	Martin Ragaway	December 17, 1959
Bentley gets a letter from Kelly's teacher Miss Pierce requesting a meeting. Apparently Kelly and some of the other girls have been leaving the school grounds without permission. Meanwhile, Kelly wants to throw a surprise party for Miss Pierce because she is marrying Tom Farrow (Hal Riddle). Kelly has to keep this from Bentley because Tom works for Mr. Driscoll (David Lewis), a client of Bentley's. Mr. Driscoll has a policy that his executives are not married. Bentley confronts Kelly and she tells him about buying a wedding present when she cut class. But Kelly can't tell him who the person is. Bentley now assumes it's a student and goes on a detective mission to find out who it is. In a dream sequence, Bentley continues to play detective. Bentley comes to believe that it's Howard and Ginger that are getting married. He does eventually find out that it's Miss Pierce. Anita Gordon as Connie Meechim.
55	15	"Bentley Goes to Washington"	Bretaigne Windust	Bob Fisher & Alan Lipscott	December 24, 1959
Bentley is coaching the Little League team that Kitty's kid brother Rocky Marsh (Flip Mark) is on. Preston 'Bulldog' Frasier (William Forrest) has come from Washington, DC to offer Bentley a job at his prestigious law firm. Bentley at first says he's not interested, but soon the offer becomes too good to turn down. Bentley tries to talk Kitty into moving with him and she finally gives in. None of his friends and family want him to move. Kelly says she will not go unless Bentley finds a good home for Jasper. Bentley asks Bert Loomis if he will take Jasper. Kelly and Ginger call Bert and tell him to not take the dog. Kelly makes sure that nobody else she knows takes Jasper. None of the boys on the team want Bentley to leave. Bentley meets a Phyllis Wentworth (Elaine Devry). She travels a lot and Bentley somehow gets talked into taking her dog, Stella. Bentley does return Stella and finds a home for Jasper. The boys on the team almost get Bentley to stay. Bentley learns that Jasper ran away. He and Kelly go looking for him, with no luck. It's time to go to the airport. Bentley agrees to let Kelly and Peter stay to look for Jasper and he goes to the airport. At the airport, Bentley runs into Toby Freyhopper (Dick Winslow) who happens to work for 'Bulldog' Frasier. After hearing what the job is really like, Bentley decides to stay home. Roger Mobley as Little Leaguer.
56	16	"Kelly, the Politician"	Bretaigne Windust	Henry Sharp	December 31, 1959
Gloria Wingate is running for president of the student council. Bentley walks past her election committee. Bentley knows Gloria's father, Sherman Wingate (John Eldredge), and she gives him a button to wear. Bentley's picture is taken with her. When Bentley gets home, he finds out that Kelly is running for the same office. Sherman is a golf rival of Bentley's. Bentley finds out that Sherman sabotaged one of his games. After some bragging from Sherman, Bentley decides to help Kelly's campaign. Ginger and Howard come by. Howard tells Bentley that his poll shows that Kelly's losing. Kelly tells Bentley that she's dropping out of the race. Bentley talks her into staying in. Howard writes about Kellys campaign in the school paper, but it doesn't have Gloria worried. Gloria posted the picture of her and Bentley, with him wearing her button, in the school cafeteria. Gloria thinks that Bentley leaked a legal story about her father to Kelly, which Bentley didn't. Gloria confronts Kelly about the story. Sherman then confronts Bentley about the story. Bentley believes that even if Kelly knew about the legal issue, she wouldn't use it in her speech. Kelly did think of mentioning the legal issue. Before the speeches are to be given, Gloria tells Kelly she's dropping out of the race. Kelly tells the audience that Gloria was dropping out for personal reasons and that hopefully she will change her mind. Gloria does and wins the election.
57	17	"Bentley: The Gentleman Farmer"	Bretaigne Windust	Arthur Alsberg & William Raynor	January 7, 1960
Bentley's been working hard and decides he needs a rest. Kelly, Ginger and Howard are rising vegetables for a school project and they are being bothered by a gopher. They wind up trapping Bentley and not the gopher. Bentley is trying to nap a little and neighbor Burt Loomis comes by with a new rifle he just got. He wants Bentley to go hunting with him. Bentley isn't interested. Kelly thinks Bentley should take up gardening to help him relax. Peter has a plan. Bentley does become interested and goes overboard buying tools and other things for the garden. Kelly begins to regret what she did. Bentley also goes overboard buying things to get rid of the gopher. Kelly gets upset because she doesn't want Bentley to kill the gopher. Bentley has a change of heart about killing the animal. Kelly already removed everything under the guise of protecting Jasper. Amy Loomis complains that the gopher is now in her yard. Burt says he'll shoot the gopher, but when he thinks he did kill it, he feels terrible. Everyone is happy when Howard says he saw the gopher alive.
58	18	"Bentley and the Combo"	Sidney Miller	Phil Davis, Laurence Marks & William Raynor	January 14, 1960
Bentley needs a favor from his band leader friend Chuck Forrest. Bentley introduces Chuck to Eva Montgomery (Lisa Davis) as an incentive. Bentley tells Chuck that Kelly is managing a small jazz combo from her high school. She would like some help from Chuck because she would like the band to do well in an upcoming Battle Of The Bands contest. Chuck comes to Bentley's house to see the band. Chuck suggests that the band add Huey Prentice, a sax player from school. But he makes Bentley think it was his idea, at first. Huey arrives for practice. Kelly and the band are not pleased with his pushy attitude. Huey makes a pest of himself at Bentley's office and at home. The band wants Huey out. Bentley volunteers to tell Huey that the band doesn't want a sax player anymore. But he has a hard time doing it. Funny thing is that the band now seems lost without Huey. Bentley goes to talk to Huey and meets his sister (Mary Tyler Moore - credited as Mary Moore). Bentley has another talk with Huey and tells him the band needs him. Huey says he's got other things to do. The night of the contest, Huey joins the band and leads them to victory.
59	19	"Bentley and the Bartered Bride"	Earl Bellamy	Written By: Bob Fisher & Alan Lipscott; Story By: James Hong & Eleanor Middleton	January 21, 1960
Bentley is dating Iris Schuster (Whitney Blake), but she continually hints at marriage. 'Cousin' Charlie is setting Peter up with a matchmaker to find him a bride. Peter and Bentley go to see Madame Choo Lo Wing about Peter's potential bride. They are shown a picture of the woman and her name is Precious Jade. Bentley must right out a check for her transportation. Iris calls asking for Bentley and Kelly says he is out making arrangements for a wedding. Another misunderstanding involving Peter's letter to Precious Jade only reinforces Iris's belief that Bentley will propose. The evenings date with Iris doesn't go well. She is expecting a ring and Bentley is trying to break things off with her. Then Bentley sees Precious Jade working at the restaurant taking pictures. Bentley finds out that her real name is Dolores Wong (Frances Fong) and she knows nothing about Peter. Bentley ask Dolores to bring the pictures to his house the next day. Bentley now has to tell Peter that Choo Lo Wing was running a scam. But before he can, Choo Lo Wing arrives with a woman she calls Precious Jade. The woman is nothing like the picture. Then Dolores arrives. Turns out Choo Lo Wing is Dolores' aunt and that's how she got the picture that Peter originally saw. Things get even more confusing when Iris shows up with her father, Mr. Schuster (William Newell). Nora Marlowe as Mrs. Schuster.
60	20	"The Blonde Issue"	Sidney Miller	Bob Fisher & Alan Lipscott	January 28, 1960
Kelly is at a dance with Mike Mitchell (Gary Vinson). She can't help notice that he keeps looking at a blonde girl. He even dances with the girl. Bentley says absolutely not to Kelly's request to dye her hair blonde. Kelly insists that Bentley's current girlfriend Monica Armstrong (Mari Aldon) dyes her red hair. Kelly bets Bentley that if she can prove Monica dyes her hair, Kelly can dye hers as well. Bentley and Kelly take a strand of Monica's hair to a Police Lab Technician, who proves it is naturally red. They run into Monica who now has blonde hair. Back at home, Bentley tells Kelly how silly Monica looks with the blonde hair. He doesn't know Monica is on the patio listening. Monica reveals to Kelly that her blonde hair is a wig. Monica lets Kelly try on the wig. Bentley goes to see a Hair Stylist (Leonid Kinskey) to pick out a shade of blonde for Kelly. Kelly shows Bentley her blonde hair and he says he doesn't like it. A disappointed Kelly runs up to her room and takes off the wig. At school, Mike explains to Kelly that he only danced with the blonde because her father owns a summer camp and he wants to get a job there. Kelly also learns that Mike really does like her hair the way it is. Bentley gets confused when he sees Kelly as a brunette again. Then Monica comes by and is back to a redhead. Bentley and Peter learn about the wig.
61	21	"Bentley and the Majorette"	Sidney Miller	Teleplay by: David Schwartz & Keith Fowler; Story by: David Schwartz	February 4, 1960
Bentley's friend Frank Weston (Karl Swenson) says that despite giving his daughter Agnes (Melinda Plowman) everything she asks for, she doesn't seem happy. Meanwhile, Kelly and her friends are going to try out for the school's drum majorettes. Bentley learns that Agnes isn't trying out. Bentley tells Frank that he should encourage Agnes to also try out. Kelly tells Bentley that she made the finals for majorette. Ginger comes by and tells Kelly that they got singer Dean Reed to perform at the finals. Ginger also says that Agnes has decided to leave their school for a more prestigious one. Under the guise of showing him a new golf club, Bentley goes to see Frank. Agnes comes up and Frank says it was her mother, Adelaide (Joan Tompkins), who insisted on the other school. Bentley talks to Agnes and finds out she doesn't want to go to the other school. Bentley gets Frank to tell Adelaide that Agnes is staying at Kelly's school and entering the majorette contest. Before the contest, Dean Reed sings "Twirly, Twirly". At first, Adelaide isn't at the contest. But she shows up as Agnes is performing and Agnes wins a position with the majorettes. Kelly doesn't get a position, but she is very happy for Agnes.
62	22	"Bentley, the Model Citizen"	Sidney Miller	Seaman Jacobs & Si Rose	February 18, 1960
Peter leaves Bentley a note that Bentley can't understand. Kelly tells Bentley that Mrs. Parkhurst (Elvia Allman) would like him to attend the City Planning Committee meeting that night. She also says that Peter is helping new neighbor Diane Jeremy's (Dolores Donlon) maid Anna May (Frances Fong). Bentley's neighbor Frank Curtis (Harry von Zell) is upset that the village is putting a traffic signal right by his house. Frank would like Bentley to go to the meeting and try and stop the signal from being put up. Bentley goes to Diane's house to have Peter translate the note. Bentley meets Diane and makes fun of one of her statues. He then finds out she sculpted it and she asks him to leave. Later, Bentley finds out that Diane would like to have the signal put in. At the meeting, Bentley makes a plea for the signal and it gets the go ahead. The signal keeps Frank up all night. An angry Frank has Diane's dog impounded and uses Bentley's name. Bentley goes to see Diane and she drops a flower pot on his head. Peter finds out from Anna May about Diane's dog. Bentley has to explain to an angry Diane that it wasn't him that called the dog pound. Diane is sculpting a statue for a City Hall competition. Bentley fills in for a sick male model. Things get embarrassing for Bentley when Mrs. Parkhurst shows up.
63	23	"The Fishing Trip"	Richard Kinon	Arthur Alsberg & Mel Diamond	February 25, 1960
Bentley's friends Cal Mitchell (Del Moore) and Phil Demling (Milton Frome) are continually bragging about their sons. Soon they feel bad that they bragged so much. Back at home, Bentley suggests that he and Kelly go bowling. At the bowling alley, Bentley is trying to explain the game to Kelly. Cal and Phil and their sons show up. Bentley introduces Kelly to Mike Mitchell and Randy Demling (Gordon Gebert). Bentley takes Kelly to the horse races, a baseball game, and a boxing match. Kelly isn't interested in any of them. Kelly tells Peter she believes that Bentley wishes he had a son. Cal and Phil invite Bentley and Kelly on a fishing trip. Kelly overhears Bentley say that's not a trip for a girl. She then convinces Bentley that she's interested in fishing. Camping with Kelly does present some problems for Cal and Phil. She uses the tent pegs to build a fire. Kelly does some other things that annoy the men. However, Mike and Randy like having Kelly around. After the trip, Mike and Randy spend more time with Kelly than with their fathers. Bentley tells Kelly he'd rather have her than a son.
64	24	"The Fortune Cookie Caper"	Earl Bellamy	Seaman Jacobs & Si Rose	March 3, 1960
Kitty asks Bentley for a bonus and Kelly asks him for a raise in her allowance. Bentley says no to both. Bentley won't give Peter a raise in salary. Peter is doing something in the kitchen and being very mysterious about it. Meanwhile, Bentley turns down a business offer from Mr. Nelson (Henry Hunter). To make more money, Peter wants to go into business making and selling homemade fortune cookies. Bentley doesn't think it's a good idea. Kelly, Ginger, and Howard go to several Chinese restaurants and get orders for Peter's cookies. The bureaucratic red tape that Peter encounters takes up so much of Bentley's time that it jeopardizes the million-dollar deal with Mr. Nelson. Kitty calls Bentley and says that Mr. Nelson will go through with the deal and Bentley should call him that evening. A mix up has the important phone number that Bentley needs for his deal possibly winding up in one of the cookies. Bentley and Peter go to General Lee Chinese restaurant and speak with Mr. Lee (Allen Jung). Bentley winds up buying all the cookies back. When the phone number isn't in that batch, Bentley goes to all the other restaurants to get the cookies. Despite not finding the phone number, Bentley's deal goes through. Bentley agrees to give Peter a raise if he gives up his cookie business. There is however one more headache involved with the business. Herb Vigran as City Clerk. Olan Soule as City Inspector.
65	25	"Kelly and the College Man"	Ezra Stone	Arthur Alsberg & Mel Diamond	March 10, 1960
Bentley's date with Laura Evans (Claire Kelly) doesn't go well as all she's interested in is books. The next day, Peter tells Bentley that Kelly and Ginger went to the college library. 16-year-old Kelly meets a 22-year-old college man named Ted Manson there. She lies and tells him that she's 19. They hit it off and spend the afternoon together. Meanwhile, Howard comes by the house looking for Kelly. She comes home and tells Howard and Bentley about Ted. Kelly has a date with Ted that evening even though she already had a date with Howard. She gets Bentley to reluctantly agree to not reveal her real age. Kelly continues to date Ted and Bentley is not happy about it. Ginger is sad that Kelly doesn't seem to have any time for her. Ginger wishes she were older. Bentley talks to her and makes her feel better. Bentley comes up with a plan to introduce Ted to Laura, who is more his age and intellectual level. Ted and Laura get along perfectly. Ted starts to suspect that Kelly isn't as old as she claims. Kelly decides she rather be 16 again. Sally Kellerman as Waitress.
66	26	"Kelly: The Career Woman"	Earl Bellamy	Seaman Jacobs & Si Rose	March 17, 1960
Bentley's new client is Melanie Bannister (Betsy Jones-Moreland), an author who is being sued for plagiarism. Meanwhile, Kelly and Ginger are trying to decide their life's work. Peter suggests being a lawyer, but Kelly thinks that would be too dull. Howard comes by and wants to go surfing, but the girls aren't interested. After talking to Bentley, Kelly reconsiders being a lawyer. Kelly wants to spend time at Bentley's office. At first Bentley likes having Kelly around. Unfortunately, it's not long before Kelly proves to be a bit disruptive. It's the day of the Bannister trial. Melanie comes by Bentley's office. Howard comes by and knocks over the water cooler with his surf board. Bentley gets irritated and tells Kelly to go do her research at the beach with Howard. Bentley is at the courthouse and the trial is underway. Things are not looking good for Melanie. Kelly and Howard come bursting in and the Judge (Frank J. Scannell) is not happy about the disturbance. Thanks to something Kelly discovered, Bentley is able to have the plagiarism suit dismissed. Marian Collier as Witness.
67	27	"Bentley's New House"	Bretaigne Windust	Arthur Alsberg & Joseph Quillan	March 24, 1960
Bentley reminisces about the ups and downs of moving into his family's new house. Doris Blake (Ann Robinson), the decorator, complains about all the stuff they have accumulated and what will she do with it. Ginger and Howard come by to see the new house. Bentley tries to get the family to give up some of their old things, but they have a hard time doing it. Even Bentley thinks of keeping some of his old stuff, until Kelly says something. Bentley tells Doris that he doesn't know what to do with the old stuff. She suggests selling it. Bentley has a Mr. Sinclair (Jonathan Hole) come over to look at the stuff. Mr. Sinclair doesn't think the stuff is worth anything, but he agrees to haul most of it away. The house is finally finished and the family is having a hard time getting used to the intercom. Peter and Kelly are not happy with the new furnishings. Even Bentley is having second thoughts. Bentley goes to see Mr. Sinclair about maybe getting some of the stuff back. Sinclair is now charging for the stuff and Bentley leaves. Doris is over for dinner, over hears Peter saying how the family hates the way the house is decorated and storms out. Bentley tries to buy all their old stuff back from Mr. Sinclair, but it's all been sold. Turns out Doris bought the stuff and had it put in the house. The family then realizes that they actually liked the new stuff better.
68	28	"Bentley, the Stage Mother"	Norman Abbott	Bob Fisher & Alan Lipscott	April 7, 1960
Bentley's client, producer Arthur Daniels (George Ives), introduces Bentley to actress Edie McDrit (Pamela Duncan). But after one date with Edie, Bentley tells Peter he'll never date an actress again. Kelly enrolled in a dramatic class and wants to become an actress. Peter tries to stop Kelly from telling Bentley just yet, but she does. Despite Kelly already paying for the class, Bentley says no. Miss Plunkett, who runs the dramatic school, comes to see Bentley. She thinks Kelly has talent and she tells Bentley off. Bentley has Kelly do some acting improvisations. He isn't impressed. Hoping to show Kelly how hard it is to be an actress, Bentley has Arthur get her a small part in an upcoming film. Bentley has Miss Plunkett work with Kelly. After watching Kelly rehearse for a while, Bentley starts to believe Kelly actually has talent. Much to Arthur's annoyance, Bentley gets a little bit too involved in Kelly's career. Arthur calls Bentley a stage mother and throws him out of his office. Noticing the change in her uncle, Kelly tells Bentley she doesn't want to be an actress any more. Bentley finds a way to annoy Arthur enough to get Kelly out of her part in the film.
69	29	"The Woman's Angle"	Earl Bellamy	Arthur Alsberg, Keith Fowler & Joseph Quillan	April 14, 1960
Peter's Cousin Charlie Lee (Victor Sen Yung) owes him money and he wants it back or Peter will have Bentley sue him. Meanwhile, Kelly is tired of being excluded from adult matters. Bentley's client Horace Bagshaw (Grandon Rhodes) is angry because he can't purchase a piece of land from Maurice Vernalle (Rolfe Sedan) that he needs to build his bank. Bagshaw says that if he doesn't get results, he'll look for another lawyer. Secretary Kitty asks if she can have Thursday afternoon off to go to her sister's baby shower, but Bentley says no. Kelly's friend Stuart wants to ask Bentley if he could borrow Bentley's car to take a bunch of kids to a dance. Bentley is in a bad mood and Stuart isn't able to ask him. Bentley tries to explain the situation with Bagshaw to Kelly. Kelly thinks Bagshaw and Maurice should just talk things over. Something Bentley says really makes Kelly upset. Wanting to makes things right with Kelly, Bentley allows her to substitute for Kitty, who can then go to the baby shower. Kelly quickly becomes overwhelmed by the tasks at hand. Despite all the confusion, Kelly helps make a deal between Bagshaw and Vernalle, and helps Peter get his money from Cousin Charlie. Stuart is able to borrow the car.
70	30	"Bentley Meets the Perfect Woman"	Earl Bellamy	Bob Fisher & Alan Lipscott	April 21, 1960
Bentley meets Melissa Trent (Patricia Barry) on a flight back from New York. She happens to be an efficiency expert. Bentley doesn't make a good first impression. At home, Peter tells Bentley he bought 200 unlabeled can goods at half price. Bentley complains about how disorganized things are in the house. Melissa comes by because Bentley took her briefcase by mistake. Melissa has a way to figure out what is in the cans. Bentley invites her to dinner where she makes some efficiency suggestions. They start dating and she starts making changes around the house. Melissa even suggests that her and Bentley get married as he needs her organizational skills. Bentley likes what she's doing, but Peter and Kelly are not happy. Melissa starts to make changes at Bentley's office, which doesn't thrill Kitty. Melissa tells Bentley that Philip Harcourt (Lester Matthews), the president of her company, is coming to town. He's looking for a capable lawyer to represent the company on the West coast. Bentley also begins to get tired of the changes. Melissa calls and tells Bentley she's set up a meeting with Harcourt for that evening. At the meeting, Bentley intentionally makes a bad impression in order to rid himself of Melissa.
71	31	"Bentley and the Travel Agent"	Earl Bellamy	Arthur Alsberg & Mel Diamond	April 28, 1960
Kelly and her girlfriends are trying to decide where to go on vacation. Bentley makes a bad first impression on Mr. Pettigrew (Charles Lane) and his daughter Francine (Myrna Fahey), who just opened a new travel agency. In order to ingratiate himself with them, he promises to help drum up business for them. Bentley books a trip for Kelly and her friends. Bentley suggests to Peter that he book a vacation through Francine's agency. Bentley then books a fishing trip for himself and his friends, Frank Curtis and Cal Mitchell. Mr. Pettigrew is very pleased with what Bentley's done. He tells Bentley he's so glad that he gave up the tensions of being a stock broker. The fishing trip is on the verge of being cancelled because of Frank and Cal's wives. Bentley invites Adelaide Mitchell (Maxine Stuart) and Liz Curtis over for dinner. Bentley tricks the women into letting their husbands go on the trip. But then the wives find out about the trick. The more Bentley tries to help, the more the bookings keep changing. Francine tells Bentley that she's worried that all these changes are frustrating her father. More and more travel changes happen. Mr. Pettigrew tells Bentley he's going back to New York and his brokerage business.
72	32	"The Very Friendly Witness"	Norman Abbott	Seaman Jacobs & Si Rose	May 5, 1960
After dating Elena del Castillo (Patricia Huston) several times, Bentley thinks she might be the one. Kelly announces that she is going steady with a boy named Hank. Chuck comes by and tells Bentley he wants to set up a double date with Florence and Jenny. Bentley tells him he's only seeing Elena. Bentley's client Mr. Granger (Addison Richards) wants him to cancel his date with Elena in order to meet with potential witness, singer Dolores Lane (Joan Tabor). Meanwhile, Kelly has problems when she realizes that she agreed to go to a dance with both Hank and Ricky. Apparently Kelly forgot that Ricky asked her weeks ago. Bentley tells her to tell Hank the truth. Bentley goes to see Dolores after telling Elena. She doesn't want to testify as she thinks it could hurt her career. Her manager tells Dolores that it would be good to be seen with Bentley. In return for her testimony and to help her career, Dolores decides to spend some time with Bentley. Something Chuck says to Elena makes her suspicious of Bentley and Dolores. Elena catches Bentley in a compromising position with Dolores and storms off. Bentley and Elena do make up. Bentley finds himself in a jam when both Elena and Dolores want to go to the same costume ball with him. Kelly tells Bentley she took his advice and told both Hank and Ricky the truth. Now neither one will take her to the dance. Bentley hopes to use Chuck as his double to take the women to the ball. Things get worse when both women show up to Bentley's house before the ball and get into an argument. And to top it off, Mr. Granger calls Bentley and tells him they won't need Dolores's testimony as they settled the case out of court.
73	33	"Bentley and the Blood Bank"	Earl Bellamy	Arthur Alsberg, Mel Diamond & Joseph Quillan	May 12, 1960
Bentley comes home and Jasper is all bandaged up. Turns out Kellys friend Susan is studying to be a junior nurse for the Red Cross. Kelly, Ginger and Susan are volunteering to help the Red Cross blood drive. Susan tells Bentley that her father, Frank Curtis, is giving a speech for the Red Cross because he was a great war hero. Frank tells Bentley that the war story is greatly exaggerated and he's afraid to give the speech. Frank asks Bentley to give the speech instead of him. Frank introduces Bentley to Nurse Isabelle Coughan (Joyce Meadows). When Bentley sees how pretty Isabelle is, he volunteers to help. Frank tells a phony story to Isabelle about Bentley being a war hero and that he should give the speech. Because she believes the story, she agrees to go out with Bentley. Isabelle tells Bentley the story Frank told her. Bentley tries to tell her the story is untrue. But when she kisses him, he goes along with the story. The Bentley war hero story spreads around and gets more and more dramatic. Bentley dreams about what really happened to him during the war. Peter volunteered to give blood, but is having second thoughts. The blood drive is a huge success. At the drive, Bentley and Isabelle run into Nurse Carrie Trisdale (Connie Gilchrist). She was at the hospital where Bentley was during the war with a broken toe. During a celebration dinner, Bentley and Frank confess about the over blown war stories. Nurse Trisdale says that the two men are still heroes.
74	34	"A Man of Importance"	Earl Bellamy	Arthur Alsberg & Mel Diamond	May 19, 1960
Peter is at the grocery store and is trying to get a date with Susie (Frances Fong). Jimmy (James Hong) comes by and Susie agrees to go on a date with him. Peter's feeling of self-importance is at an all-time low. Delivery man Harry (Sid Melton) comes by and tells Peter he has a problem and needs some advice. Peter gets excited because he thinks Harry wants his advice. It turns out Harry wanted Bentley's advice. Peter gets upset and winds up burning dinner. Bentley and Kelly's compliments about dinner backfire, because they didn't know he had to make it out of a can. Bentley talks Peter out of leaving by telling him he can become important here. Peter invents a battery powered silent butler, which is just a pile of junk. To boost Peter's ego, Bentley lies and tells him that Frank Curtis is going to manufacture the invention. When Peter learns the truth, he decides to leave for San Francisco. Bentley tries to tell him how important it was for him to be around and help raise Kelly. On the train, Peter reminisces about all the good things he did for the Bentley household. Peter comes back home. Pat O'Malley as Train Conductor.
75	35	"Bentley and the Beach Bum"	Earl Bellamy	Arthur Alsberg & Mel Diamond	May 26, 1960
Bentley is not happy about Kelly taking up surfing. At the beach, Kelly introduces Bentley and Kitty to fellow surfer Barry Willis, who calls himself Prince Awani. Barry is surprised when Bentley says that he's going over some work with Kitty. Barry likes the simple life and lives in a shack on the beach. Barry shows them his shack that he built. Kelly starts to embrace Barry's dislike of commercialism and worshiping the dollar. Bert Loomis complains to Bentley that Ginger is starting to feel the way that Kelly does. Bentley tells Peter that he's inviting Barry over to experience a little gracious living. After dinner that night, Bert comes by. Bentley offers Barry a job at Bert's toy company without Bert's consent. Barry turns the offer down. To hopefully bring Kelly and Ginger around, Bentley and Bert start to live the life of a beach bum. But Kelly knows what they are up to. A Beach Inspector (Lester Dorr) tells all the beach bums to get their shacks off the beach. Bentley talks Barry into getting a job so he can buy some land on the beach. Kelly is surprised that Barry now embraces the idea of making money.
76	36	"Where There's a Will"	Bretaigne Windust	Bob Fisher & Alan Lipscott	June 2, 1960
Bentley is having the reading of the will of rich Mr. Crabtree at his house that evening. Ginger wants to hear the reading, so Kelly hides her in the closet. An odd collection of people show up. Right before the will is read the lights go out. When Peter gets them back on, there is a lot of in fighting amongst the people there. Then the will goes missing and the reading is cancelled. Late that night, Peter is woken up by strange noises. He decides to look for the will. Peter runs into Kelly, who is also looking. They see the front door opening and cover the person with a rug. It turns out to be Bentley, who was looking outside for the will. Elaine Baker (Leigh Snowden), Crabtree's nurse, calls and asks Bentley to come over as her life is in danger. When Bentley arrives, she tells him that she thinks Crabtree's beatnik nephew Ansel (Kip King) and Lola Winslow (Sandra Warner), Crabtree's housekeeper, stole the will. Bentley goes to a beatnik joint to talk to Ansel and Lola. Bentley sees Lola put some drops in Ansel's tea and thinks it's poison. It turns out it was just saccharine. Bentley doesn't learn anything from the two. In the end, Bentley figures out that Jasper took the will. When the will is read, Crabtree writes that he spent all his money. Dorothea Neumann as Cora Bacula, Crabtree's sister.
77	37	"Bentley's Birthday Gift"	Earl Bellamy	Everett Freeman & Sam Locke	June 9, 1960
Kelly wants to surprise Bentley on his birthday. She asks Peter to try and find out if Bentley would like a new golf bag. Peter is not very subtle and winds up irritating Bentley. Meanwhile, Chuck Forrest wants Bentley to give him the number of Ruth Martin (Nancy Valentine) who he met in Bentley's office. But, Bentley won't do it. Kelly asks Chuck about a gift and he suggests a surprise party, hoping Kelly can find a list of Bentley's friends, including Ruth. Bentley is at Ruth's house when Chuck calls asking for a date. Bentley finds out that Kelly gave Chuck the phone number. Bentley is mad at Kelly, until Peter tells him she gave Chuck the list of friends to invite to the surprise party. Bentley feels bad for yelling at Kelly. Kelly plans a dinner out and a concert for Bentley, now that he knows about the party. Bentley is secretly organizing the surprise party himself. What follows is confusion that results in Bentley not showing up at the restaurant and no surprise party. Bentley and Kelly do get together eventually to celebrate his birthday. Murray Alper as Diner Counterman. Edward Colmans as Maitre d' Robert.

=== Season 4 (1960–61) ===
No. overall	No. in season	Title	Directed by	Written by	Original release date
78	1	"Jasper the Second"	Earl Bellamy	Everett Freeman	September 15, 1960
Jasper, Bentley's beloved family dog, dies at the age of 14. Bentley is dead set against adopting another dog. Cecil Curtis (Dennis Holmes), Kelly's friend, has an extra dog that needs a home. Peter and Kelly want to keep him. Bentley says the dog can stay with them one day until they find another home for him. Peter comes up with a plan to keep the dog. During the night, Peter gets the dog to start barking. The living room is a mess and Bentley thinks the dog was barking at a burglar. Bentley figures out that he was tricked and turns the tables on Peter and Kelly. Bentley tells them that he put an ad in the paper for the dog. A woman comes about the ad and Peter finds a way for her to not be interested in the dog. Sam Humber (Stanley Adams), who owns a lumber yard, agrees to take the dog. Bentley and Cecil sneak into the lumber yard to make sure the dog has a good home. Humber catches the two and makes them leave. They don't like how the dog is living and sneak back in. They get the dog and try and sneak him out but are caught by a policeman. Cecil tells Peter and Kelly that Bentley had to go to the police station. Humber tells Bentley he can have the dog if he pays $200 for a new fence and some stolen lumber. Cecil tells them that Bentley refused to be blackmailed. Just then, Bentley walks in with the dog. He decides to keep him and names him Jasper the Second.
79	2	"Kelly Learns to Drive"	Earl Bellamy	Seaman Jacobs & Si Rose	September 22, 1960
Bentley doesn't believe that women should be allowed to drive. Kelly brings up that Bentley promised she could get her learner's permit. Because a woman rear-ended his car earlier that day, Bentley thinks Kelly should wait a couple more years. Bentley and Kelly get Peter involved in the conversation and Peter doesn't know which side to take. Bentley reluctantly agrees to let Howard teach Kelly how to drive. At the office, Bentley is trying to dictate a letter to secretary Kitty (Sue Ane Langdon), but all he can think about is Kelly. And loud traffic noises outside are not helping. Bentley decides to teach Kelly, but the lesson doesn't go well. Later, Bentley tries to teach Kelly how an engines works, which only confuses her more. Bentley then tries to teach Kelly how to drive with a toy steering wheel while sitting on the couch. Kelly gets frustrated and says she never wants to learn how to drive. Miss Mortenson (Elaine Devry), Kelly's Drivers Ed teacher, says she will have a talk with Bentley. Howard takes Kelly driving and she does really well. Peter comes up with a plan to make Kelly's good driving look like it is because of Bentley's training. Bentley learns from Howard that Kelly had already taken the driver's test and passed with 100%.
80	3	"Trial Separation"	Earl Bellamy	Bob Fisher & Alan Lipscott	September 29, 1960
Bentley's latest girlfriend Lila West (Ann McCrea) says that employers and employees should not let issues go unresolved. To show Kelly how it works, Peter tells Bentley something that irritates him about Bentley and Bentley does the same to Peter. But, instead of making things better, Peter and Bentley have a huge fight. The next morning, Peter questions their compatibility and decides that it's best to have a one week trial separation. Because he owes money, 'Cousin' Charlie Fong (Victor Sen Yung) wants Peter to invest in his employment agency. Charlie tells Peter he'll make him a partner. Charlie creates a misunderstanding between Peter and Bentley by telling Bentley that Peter is quiting for good. Bentley now needs to hire someone else. This causes Peter to send an incompetent man named Harry (H.W. Gim) to be the Gregg's houseboy. Bentley fires Harry immediately. Peter then sends over an absent-minded man named Wing (H.T. Tsiang). Peter is about to come back, but some more advise from Lila backfires and Peter leaves again. Kelly finds a way to bring them together.
81	4	"Mystery Witness"	Earl Bellamy	Lou Derman	October 6, 1960
Kelly was stopped at a red light when she is rear-ended in a traffic accident. Kelly had her friend Dennis (Jimmy Hawkins) with her. Dennis says he took pictures of the accident. The woman, Mrs. Fosgood, threatens to sue. Bentley tells Kelly to not worry about it. The next day Linda McCambridge (Ann Robinson), from the Citizens Crime Committee, visits Bentley at his office. Linda and Bentley do not see eye to eye on issues. Mrs. Fosgood comes by the house and wants to settle out of court, otherwise she'll sue. With the help of Dennis' pictures, Bentley learns that a Mike Pappas (Ted de Corsia) was a witness to the accident. Pappas refuses to be a witness in court. Bentley gets a letter stating that Mrs. Fosgood is suing him for $10,000. Pappas' Attorney (Norman Leavitt) and Pappas meet Bentley in his office. They try to bribe Bentley and when he refuses, Pappas threatens Bentley. Kelly tells Bentley that two men in a car followed her home. It gets to the point where Bentley and Peter think that Mr. Primo (Nick Dennis), the piano tuner, is there to kill Bentley. Bentley meets again with Linda McCambridge. Just then, Pappas comes by. Turns out that Pappas is a bookie and he agrees to leave town if Bentley leaves him alone. Linda is very impressed with Bentley. Peter finds a way to have Mrs. Fosgood drop her lawsuit.
82	5	"A Crush on Bentley"	Earl Bellamy	Everett Freeman	October 13, 1960
Bentley meets Kelly's classmate, Liz McGavin (Linda Evans). She is the daughter of Ben McGavin (Frank Wilcox), who Bentley is representing in a divorce case. Liz tells Bentley that the divorce doesn't really bother her. Peter thinks she has a crush on Bentley. Later, Ben comes by the house. A bunch of Kelly's girlfriends come over and are making a lot of noise. Ben and Bentley go out to the patio. More distractions occur and Ben is getting upset. Ben insists that Bentley use his lodge by the lake to get work done on the case. When Bentley arrives at the lodge, he finds Liz there. Liz offers to help Bentley and she mentions how she likes older men. Bentley asks her to leave, but then he figures out that Liz likes him because she misses a father figure. Bentley gets Peter and Kelly to come to the lodge. He also has Ben's wife Phyllis (Angela Greene) show up. Bentley asks Peter if he called Ben. It's not long before Ben shows up. He came to take Liz home, but then he sees Phyllis. Ben winds up staying. Kelly and Liz entertain by doing a Charlie Chaplin routine. Time at the lodge brings Ben and Phyllis back together. Note: Television debut of Linda Evans (billed as "Linda Evenstad"). Years later, Evans would play John Forsythe's wife in the prime-time soap Dynasty. Song: Frank performs "Believe Me, If All Those Endearing Young Charms".
83	6	"Peter Gets Jury Notice"	Earl Bellamy	Everett Freeman & Danny Simon	October 20, 1960
Peter's been waiting 5 months to get another date with Linda Toy (Lisa Lu). When he does get a date, it's on the same day as his jury duty. Peter asks Bentley if there's any way he can get out of jury duty. Bentley suggests that Peter take Linda to court with him and watch him in action. Bentley is working with nervous client Mr. Mayberry. Bentley says they would have a better case if they had a witness. It's the day of Bentley's case and by coincidence Peter is in the jury. Peter is humiliated in front of Linda when he is kicked off the jury because Bentley is one of the lawyers. At home, Peter gives Bentley the cold shoulder. Meanwhile, things are not going well for Bentley's case. Peter comes by Bentley's office to apologize. Something Peter says makes Bentley realize that he would be a reliable witness in the Mayberry case. Because Peter doesn't want to do it, Bentley actually has to subpoena him. Peter's reluctant testimony helps Bentley. Linda also helps Bentley win the case. Peter and Linda start dating. Herb Vigran as Bailiff. Robert Carson as Judge. Frances Fong as Susie (archive footage). James Hong as Jimmy (archive footage).
84	7	"Hilda the Jewel"	Earl Bellamy	Lou Derman & Mel Diamond	October 27, 1960
The grocery store where Peter's friend Susie works will be doing renovactions for three weeks. Peter would like Bentley to temporarily hire Susie to help him with the housework. Peter puts on an act about how hard he works and Bentley agrees to hire an assistant. Bentley's client Mr. Anderson (Byron Morrow) will be vacationing for 3 weeks. When he hears that Bentley is looking for someone to help Peter, Mr. Anderson suggests his maid. Peter is surprised when Bentley brings home Hilda (Kathleen Freeman). Peter doesn't like Hilda's overbearing nature and makes up a reason for Bentley to get rid of her. Bentley hears about Susie from Kelly and realizes what Peter is up to. Even Kelly gets annoyed with Hilda when she sewed a skirt on Kelly's bathing suit. That night, Hilda interrupts Bentley with his date Sherry Johnson. Sherry and Hilda strike up a conversation because Hilda is Swedish and so is Sherry's mother. Soon Hilda has Peter and Bentley doing a lot of hard work around the house. Bentley can barely move, his muscles are so sore. Bentley begins to regret insisting Hilda stay and finds a way to have Mr. Anderson come home early.
85	8	"It Happens in November"	Earl Bellamy	Seaman Jacobs & Si Rose (t); Helen Mandel (s)	November 3, 1960
Pat Larchmont (Kathleen Hughes), a woman from the Election Board, asks Peter if she could use Bentley's garage as a polling place. Peter tells her the garage is full of junk. He offers the living room and she says she'll come by later to check with Bentley. Bentley is not happy about the idea until he meets the beautiful Pat. Chuck Forrest comes by and also finds Pat attractive. Bentley volunteers to be on the Election Board. The day of the election Pat doesn't show up. But Mrs. Holworthy (Elvia Allman), Miss Binz and Mrs. Crawford (Maudie Prickett), the other Board women, do. Miss Binz finds a corsage and a dinner invitation that Bentley meant for Pat. Bentley is relieved when Mrs. Holworthy says they'll be there late counting ballots, so no dinner dates. Things get complicated for Bentley when he has to help with the voting but also wants to meet with an important client. Mrs. Holworthy will let Bentley leave for an hour. When Bentley gets to the office, Kitty tells him that the client had to postpone the meeting. Pat comes by the house and tells Bentley she can't get a replacement for him. Jasper gets loose and briefly disrupts the voting. Bentley misses the client's phone call. Because of something a new voter, Anna Smith (Jeanne Bates), says, Bentley realizes that the voting is more important.
86	9	"How to Catch a Man"	Earl Bellamy	Mel Diamond & Mel Tolkin	November 10, 1960
Bentley's friend Phil Demling (Milton Frome) brags to him how girls call his son Tony for dates. Bentley says he's glad Kelly doesn't call boys for dates. Meanwhile, Dennis is disappointed that Kelly won't go out with him. Bentley later learns that Kelly has called Tony hoping he would take her to a party. Kelly is upset when she finds out that Tony is taking Lila Meredith (Cheryl Holdridge) instead. Bentley's date, Paula Tabore (Greta Thyssen), gives advice to Kelly on the finer points of trapping a boy. Kelly does what Paula recommended and soon is spending a lot of time with Tony. Bentley finds out from Phil that Tony is into Archaeology. Bentley now understands Kelly's sudden interest in the subject. It doesn't take long before Kelly finds out that Tony isn't worth it if she can't be herself. Bentley finds out that Paula set up their getting together.
87	10	"Kelly, the Matchmaker"	Earl Bellamy	Arthur Alsberg & Mel Diamond	November 17, 1960
Lately Kelly has been helping her friends with their love lives. Meanwhile, Bentley is representing wrestler George (Mike Mazurki), who was harmed in a bar fight. Peter tells Bentley that he followed Kelly's suggestion and met a new woman to go out with. Howard Meechim (Jimmy Boyd) complains to Bentley that Kelly fixed him up with several girls and he'd rather be with Kelly. Bentley is concerned with what Kelly is doing and tells her she may be meddling. Bentley says they should spend some time together and Kelly suggests golf. While getting the golf lesson from Bentley, Kelly introduces him to her pretty math teacher, Janice McCleery (Joan O'Brien). Bentley is having a nice time with Janice. Bentley comes to realize that Kelly set up this meeting between the two. Ginger Farrell (Bernadette Withers) tells Bentley that she shouldn't have listened to Kelly. Kelly's other friends start to regret taking her love life advice. Even Peter is sorry he listened to Kelly. Kitty tells Bentley she got a rash from poison ivy because of a date Kelly set her up with. George comes by Bentley's office to thank him for the settlement Bentley got for him. Bentley recruits George and Janice to teach Kelly a lesson. Kelly is led to believe that George is a jealous ex-boyfriend of Janice's. George has come to beat up Bentley. In the end, Kelly is pretty much over her matchmaking.
88	11	"Bentley Cracks the Whip"	Earl Bellamy	Bob Fisher & Alan Lipscott	November 24, 1960
Bentley believes the family is spending too much money and puts the household on a strict weekly budget. Peter and Kelly want to know if Bentley will also put himself on a budget, which he agrees to. Grandpa Ling (Beal Wong) comes by because he wants to save face for a bad transaction he made for Bentley. A Sheila Martin comes by the house. Grandpa Ling hitched a ride with Sheila and he left something in her car. Bentley has a date with Sheila and the family wants to know how he can take a girl out on his tight budget. He says he'll invite her to the house for dinner. But Sheila calls from a restaurant and asks Bentley to come meet her. Bentley winds up in an embarrassing situation at the restaurant because of his lack of money. Grandpa Ling sells raffle tickets to benefit Bentley and people start to believe he is down on his luck. Bentley straightens out the raffle misunderstanding and gives up on his budget. Peter Leeds as Maitre d' of Stephanos. Sid Melton as Harry.
89	12	"Bentley and the Big Board"	Earl Bellamy	Seaman Jacobs & Si Rose	December 1, 1960
Kelly, Ginger and Lila can't decide how to spend the money in their club treasury. Bentley suggests buying stock in Sutton Industries, a company he represents. He says the company has a merger coming through that should enhance the stock. The girls agree to buy one share and so does Peter. Bentley is dating Joanne Sutton (Mary Tyler Moore), daughter of company president Ronald J. Sutton (Neil Hamilton). Joanne wants to go out, but Bentley has a meeting with Ronald. Joanne convinces the two to put off the meeting. Peter is upset when the stock goes down. Bentley takes Peter to a broker's office to see how things work. While there, a Stock Trader (Thomas Browne Henry) mistakes Peter for someone associated with the company that might merge with Sutton. Peter goes to the company's annual stockholders meeting. Peter disrupts the meeting with constant questions. Bentley and Sutton get quite annoyed. Later, Bentley tells Peter to just sell his stock. Peter causes a panic at the broker office when he sells his share. Sutton stock drops and the merger is threatened. When Ronald finds out that it was Bentley's houseboy that caused the panic, he fires Bentley. In the end, the merger goes through and Sutton stock goes up.
90	13	"Dear Bentley"	Earl Bellamy	Bob Fisher & Alan Lipscott	December 15, 1960
Kelly gets her very own teenage advice column in the school paper. Bentley's not so sure that Kelly should be giving out advice at her age. Kelly says the column is on a two week trial period. Bentley sets up a date with Janice McCleery (Joan O'Brien), who is the faculty advisor for the paper, to discuss Kelly. Bentley is surprised that Janice still approves of the column and they have a fight over it. Bentley decides to help Kelly with the column and keep her out of trouble. His advice is not well received. Kelly isn't getting as many letters to the column as she did before. Bentley's friends Cal Mitchell and Ollie (Francis DeSales) scheme to teach him a lesson. They get their actress friend Judy Morrison to help. Bentley later learns he was pranked. Bentley apologizes to Kelly and Janice for getting involved and it's decided to end the column. Vito Scotti as Chef.
91	14	"Bentley and the Lost Chord"	Earl Bellamy	Danny Simon	December 22, 1960
One of Mr. Gregg's clients needs an original theme song for a new sci-fi series. When he hears Peter humming an original tune while vacuuming, he asks for him to record it. Unfortunately, Peter soon forgets the melody. Paul Dubov as Don Wheeler. Alvy Moore as Martin Burns.
92	15	"Ginger's Big Romance"	Earl Bellamy	Keith Fowler & Ralph Goodman	December 29, 1960
Ginger has an eye for David Ross (Billy Gray). David has an eye for Kelly. Bentley has both eyes on everyone. Arlene Howell as Gloria.
93	16	"Bentley the Angel"	Earl Bellamy	Bob Fisher & Alan Lipscott	January 5, 1961
94	17	"Bentley and the Woodpecker"	Earl Bellamy	Seaman Jacobs & Si Rose	January 12, 1961
Bentley's friend Cal Mitchell (Del Moore) has a woodpecker that keeps him up at night. Cal phones Bentley in the middle of the night to say he finally scared the bird away. The bird winds up at Bentley's house and keeps him up all night. Bentley talks to the Police Chief (Jess Kirkpatrick), but he says there is nothing he can do. After making several phone calls and getting nowhere, Bentley goes back to the Police Chief. Maureen Logan (Jeanne Bal), of the Chronicle, writes a story about Bentley's dilemma. Bentley decides to get rid of the bird himself. He tries several different things, but none work. Maureen sees Bentley failing at another attempt and prints a picture in the paper. One morning the bird is gone, and Peter and Kelly think Bentley killed it. Maureen even writes a story about whether Bentley did away with the bird. Bentley has a dream that he is imprisoned for killing the bird. Everyone is relieved when the bird returns and has babies.
95	18	"Bentley Goes to Europe"	Earl Bellamy	Keith Fowler & Everett Freeman	January 19, 1961
Peter has an opportunity to go with Bentley and Kelly on a free trip to Italy, but first he has to prove he's a United States citizen in order to obtain a passport. Easier said than done. Howard Wendell as Arthur Daniels.
96	19	"The Greggs in Rome"	Earl Bellamy	Keith Fowler & Everett Freeman	January 26, 1961
Bentley is in Rome to pressure Italian director Bartolo Frascati to complete a motion picture. Bartolo has a way of dragging out productions. While Bentley is meeting with Bartolo, Bartolo's son Dino takes Kelly around town. Peter wants to find a relative of his, Li Sing (Allen Jung), but has no luck. Bentley meets attractive Sharon Travis (Christine White), who is in the hotel room next to his. An attempt by Bentley to spend some time with Sharon backfires. The next day, Bentley, Peter and Kelly go to the movie studio to have Bartolo sign a completion contract. Bartolo refuses to sign and shuts down production. Bentley, Peter and Kelly decide to tour Rome with a guide named Roco Pasquali (Nick Dennis). Roco gives Bentley an idea how to get Bartolo to quickly finish the film. Bentley gets to spend some time with Sharon and Kelly spends more time with Dino. Peter finally runs into his Cousin Li. Peter Leeds as Enrico Savarini.
97	20	"The Greggs in London"	Earl Bellamy	William Raynor & Myles Wilder	February 2, 1961
While in London, Bentley, Kelly and Peter will be staying in a friends townhouse while the friends are away. When they arrive, they meet Beechim (Laurie Main), the butler. Peter immediately butts heads with Beechim. Meanwhile, Bentley and Kelly do some sight seeing and visit Fromondelay Manor. At the Manor, it constantly appears to tour guide Evalyn Fromondelay that Bentley wants to steal some artifacts. In an attempt to make amends, Bentley goes to see an Antique Shop Owner (Gilchrist Stuart) and buys a carriage lamp to replace one that was stolen at the Manor. Bentley invites Evalyn and her Aunt, Lady Augusta Fromondelay (Isobel Elsom), to dinner. Beechim informs Bentley that the townhouse will soon be sold and a garage put in its place. Beechim and Peter are still at odds with each other. Beechim's feelings are hurt when Evalyn and Lady Augusta prefer Peter's food to his. Lady Augusta says she will buy the townhouse and keep Beechim on if he learns how to make Peter's meal.
98	21	"The Greggs in Paris"	Earl Bellamy	Howard Leeds	February 16, 1961
The Greggs tour the Louvre. Fritz Feld as Museum Guard. Dick Wilson as Museum Guard.
99	22	"Encore in Paris"	Earl Bellamy	Robert Pirosh	February 23, 1961
Bentley, Kelly, and Peter all get bitten by the love bug, while in Paris. Alan Hewitt as Yosef. Marc Cavell as Makhmud. Danielle De Metz as Babette.
100	23	"There's No Place Like Home"	Earl Bellamy	William Raynor & Myles Wilder	March 2, 1961
Bentley, Kelly and Peter have returned from Europe. They act more worldly and cultured, which their friends don't exactly appreciate. They bore everyone with their photos, home movies, and tales about their trip. Frank Curtis (Harry von Zell) has finally had enough and tells Bentley off. The next day Frank comes by Bentley's office to apologize. But he loses it again when Bentley starts to show him pictures of the trip. Bentley's new secretary, Connie (Jeanne Bates), finally tells him that people are just tired of it all. Julie Sanders (Mari Aldon), Kelly's teacher, tells Bentley that Kelly has become a "travel bore". Julie says she's familiar with the situation, because she did the same thing when she came back from a European trip. Bentley enlists Julie's help in showing Peter and Kelly how snobbish they were acting. Cathleen Cordell as Mildred Curtis.
101	24	"Bentley Swims Upstream"	Earl Bellamy	Bob Fisher & Alan Lipscott	March 9, 1961
Howard and Kelly try their hand at writing a jingle for the salmon industry. Lester Matthews as Mr. Harcourt.
102	25	"A Man Among Men"	Earl Bellamy	William Raynor & Myles Wilder	March 16, 1961
Kelly has fallen for the star high school basketball center, much to Howard's dismay. Joby Baker as Biff Merideth.
103	26	"Peter's China Doll"	Earl Bellamy	Seaman Jacobs & Si Rose	March 23, 1961
Peter comes home from a poker game with a little girl named Lily Toi (Ginny Tiu). He tells Bentley that she is his daughter. Peter says he paid $50 to adopt her. Bentley says that the paperwork Peter got isn't legal. Peter really wants to keep Lily and Bentley says he'll see what he can do. Lily shows the family how well she can play the piano. Peter and Bentley go to the adoption agency. They are told by Miss Morgan that Peter can't adopt Lily unless there is a father and a mother. Peter says he'll get married. Peter calls a few of the women he knows hoping one will agree to see him. Peter goes to see Nancy and thinks it will work out. Miss Morgan calls and says they have a couple that want to adopt Lily. Peter is very disappointed. Until the couple comes, the family distances themselves from Lily so she won't get too attached to them. When Mr. and Mrs. Lee come and pick up Lily, Peter tries to talk them out of it by telling them that she is a bad child. The Lee's take Lily home, but she later returns to Peter. Peter tries to act cruelly to Lily, but she knows he doesn't mean it. Lily knows that she is going to stay with the Lee's, but she just missed Peter.
104	27	"Bentley and the Counterspy"	Earl Bellamy	Bob Fisher & Alan Lipscott	March 30, 1961
Howard volunteers for the Army, and he asks Kelly if she'll wait for him.
105	28	"Peter Plays Cupid"	Earl Bellamy	Seaman Jacobs & Si Rose	April 6, 1961
Peter plays Cupid for his teacher and Bentley. Jeanne Bal as Suzanne. Vito Scotti as José.
106	29	"Bentley and the Great Debate"	Earl Bellamy	Charles R. Marion	April 13, 1961
Several students form a committee to get rid of Coach Harper (Richard Crane). They feel that their basketball team can't win under his leadership. Bentley's friend Phil Braden (Raymond Bailey) feels the same way and wants Bentley's help to remove Harper. Bentley talks to Harper about buying out his contract, but Harper refuses. Phil is upset that Bentley couldn't get rid of Harper. Raymond Staley, a stuttering, bumbling student, seems to be the only student supporting Harper. Marty Braden (Ryan O'Neal), the captain of the school's debating team and also the star player on the basketball team, challenges Raymond to a debate over Harper. Kelly decides to help Raymond prepare. Harper comes by Bentley's office and tells him he's quitting. Bentley talks Harper into staying and giving Raymond a chance. Bentley thinks that despite her good intentions, Kelly is actually hurting Raymond's chances. Bentley finds a way for Raymond to just speak for himself. Despite some stuttering, Raymond wins the debate and Coach Harper can stay.
107	30	"Bentley and the Nature Girl"	Earl Bellamy	Seaman Jacobs & Si Rose	April 20, 1961
Bentley is attracted to Angela Murdock (Andra Martin), a woman who is teaching Kelly's nature studies class. To impress Angela, Bentley attends an adult class where they discuss bird watching. Bentley is quite bored. Angela's father, Professor Murdock (Russell Collins), claims there is a rare bird in the area. Mrs. Carmella Hogworthy (Elvia Allman) says he is making it up. Bentley spends several weekends with Angela trying to get that rare bird call recorded for her father to prove him right. Bentley's friends, Cal and Chuck, are upset because he is not spending more time with them. Bentley captures the sound of the rare bird on tape. When Bentley cancels another card game, Cal and Chuck record silly comments over the tape to get back at him. Bentley takes the recording to a bird lovers meeting and is embarrassed when it is played. He leaves before to whole tape is finished. It turns out there were some of the bird calls at the end of the tape. Professor Murdock is vindicated. Bentley spends a lot more time with Angela. Even though Bentley really likes Angela, all she can do is talk about birds. Bentley stops seeing her.
108	31	"Bentley's Mad Friends"	Earl Bellamy	Keith Fowler & Everett Freeman	April 27, 1961
Bentley would like to help his friends Walt and Eve Tatum (Joe Flynn and Betty Lou Gerson) with their constant quarreling. He gets them to agree to a non fighting pact with a penalty to the one that starts a fight first. Bentley comes home and Kelly is yelling at Howard. He lost her school books with her term paper in one of them. Peter is yelling at Harry the deliveryman. Bentley then yells at Jasper for tracking in mud and leaves. Bentley, Kelly, and Peter enter into a pact to not get angry. The penalty is having to give Jasper a bath. Bentley talks to Walt and Walt seemed happier when he was fighting with Eve. At home, both Peter and Kelly lose their tempers and each bathe Jasper. But, they agree that they feel better. They then plot to get Bentley to lose his temper. Their plan worked and Jasper gets his third bath of the day. Bentley finds out that the two made up things to get him mad. Bentley admits that he feels better and they dissolve their pact. Bentley gets a call from Walt who tells him he and Eve are getting a divorce. Bentley gets them to argue and be happy again. Later, Bentley and Peter get into an argument and Jasper goes running because he thinks he's going to get another bath.
109	32	"Hilda Rides Again"	Earl Bellamy	Bob Fisher & Alan Lipscott	May 4, 1961
Bentley's client Bart Anderson (Fredd Wayne) has a problem. His housekeeper Hilda is in love with his chauffeur Gustav (Gene Roth), but Gustav ignores her. Hilda wants to quit. Bart suggests that Bentley take Hilda on for the time being, so no one else gets her. Bentley reluctantly agrees to give it a try. Peter and Kelly are against it, as they remember the last time she stayed with them. Bentley makes a deal with them. Hilda arrives and immediately points out all the mistakes Peter has made cleaning. Hilda runs Peter ragged. Peter tells Hilda that maybe Gustav won't talk to her because she is so bossy. Hilda says she's going back to Sweden, but Bentley tells her to wait. Bentley talks to Gustav and something he says gets Gustav interested in Hilda. Hilda now needs to brush up on cars as that is what Gustav cares about. Bentley has one more trick that will guarantee that Gustav falls for Hilda.
110	33	"Kelly's Charge Account"	Earl Bellamy	Bob Fisher & Alan Lipscott	May 11, 1961
Kelly tries to borrow money from Peter. Kelly then asks Bentley to let her open a charge account at a local department store. Bentley will give it a try for a month. Meanwhile, Ginger asks her father, Cal Mitchell, to let her have an account. Cal's wife Adelaide (Evelyn Scott) is for it, but Cal isn't. Cal can't believe what Bentley did. It's not long before Kelly becomes a personal loan company to all of her girlfriends. The other girl's fathers are also upset with what Bentley allowed. They scheme to get back at him by not giving their daughters their allowance to pay back Kelly. After he figures out what happened, Bentley confronts the other men. The girls decide to work off their debt. The father's are so impressed that their daughters are willing to work that they allow them to get accounts. Kelly buys Bentley and Peter a gift each. Francis DeSales as Barney. Charlotte Stewart as Maybelle.
111	34	"Bentley Builds a Pool"	Earl Bellamy	Bob Fisher & Alan Lipscott	May 18, 1961
Bentley hasn't seen much of Kelly lately. Kelly has been spending a lot of time at Ginger's house because of their pool. Cal Mitchell, Ginger's father, is tired of all her friends hanging around their backyard. Because of something Kelly says to him, Cal slyly convinces Bentley into building his own backyard pool. The pool is taking longer than expected to build and costing more as well. The pool finally gets finished and all of Kelly's friends show up. Peter has to hire extra help to feed all the guests. Bentley suggests to Cal that they trade days to have the kids come over. The kids even take over Bentley's house. Cal shuts down his pool and comes over to Bentley's. Things eventually quiet down when all the kids go to another family's yard because they have a pool and tennis court.
112	35	"Bentley Slays a Dragon"	Earl Bellamy	Seaman Jacobs & Si Rose	May 25, 1961
Bentley and Kelly notice Peter has been acting strangely. Apparently, Peter is tired of being a nobody and wants to have a more dynamic personality. To prove he can make quick decisions, Peter buys a toaster from a Toaster Salesman (Tommy Farrell) before the man even finishes his pitch. Bentley gets upset and Peter feels worthless again. Bentley speaks to Cousin Charlie to see if Peter can be elected to some office at the Purple Dragon Lodge. Peter is voted chairman of the building committee, not knowing the position has no real duties. Peter lets power go to his head and he starts looking for a new building for the lodge, though the members have no intention of moving. He puts lodge money down on a vacant lot. Bentley goes with Peter to see A.J. Graham (George O. Petrie) at the bank about a loan. He doesn't get the loan and the lodge members are angry that they now have to come up with $5000. Peter quits his position and says he'd rather be a nobody again. Allen Jung as Sam Wang. H.W. Gim as Cousin Gregory.
113	36	"A Favor for Bentley"	Earl Bellamy	Seaman Jacobs & Si Rose	June 1, 1961
Howard is upset that Kelly cancelled a date. Kelly explains that she's the chairman of her club's show planning committee. She would like to get actor Brad Douglas (Michael Forest) to make an appearance at her show. Brad is a client of Bentley's and as a favor, she would like Bentley to talk to him. Bentley says no. Bentley would like to have Gloria Thatcher (Adele Mara) over for dinner Sunday night. Peter has a date that night. As a favor he will change his date if Bentley gets Brad for Kelly. Bentley talks to Brad. Brad agrees to appear at Kelly's show if Bentley does a favor for him. This leads to a chain of favors made by several people, each favor being dependent on the other being kept. It gets very complicated and not everything works out the way it should have.
114	37	"Kelly Gets a Job"	Earl Bellamy	Bob Fisher & Alan Lipscott	June 8, 1961
Kelly is invited to a formal college fraternity dance. Bentley refuses to buy a new formal gown for her. Kelly and Bentley are arguing and Peter wants them to start dinner as he has a date. To earn money for a new dress, Kelly wants to get a job as a teen fashion model. Older model Daphne Carroll helps Kelly get a job at Barney Beeber's (Lawrence Dobkin) dress shop. Daphne also agrees to help train Kelly. But, the job takes its toll on Kelly and she is constantly exhausted. Bentley goes to talk with Barney about Kelly working less hours. Barney fires her. Bentley offers to help Barney with a lawsuit he's facing. Barney agrees to keep Kelly on and she'll work less. Kelly starts to wonder why she is being treated differently than the other models. When Kelly learns about the deal Bentley made with Barney, she quits. Barney comes to the house and tells Kelly she's a good model and he needs her. He even tells Bentley he doesn't care about the lawsuit. Kelly goes back to work and is able to get her formal. Vito Scotti as Gabriel.
115	38	"Kelly's Tangled Web"	Earl Bellamy	John Elliotte (s/t) & Bob Fisher & Alan Lipscott (t)	June 15, 1961
Bentley catches Kelly lying to Howard to get out of a date, so she can go out with Bruce. As punishment, Bentley won't let her go on the date with Bruce. Bentley wants Kelly to understand that lying is wrong, even if it's a little lie. Kelly gets Peter to talk to Bentley, but Bentley won't change his mind. Kelly gets a call from Bruce and he claims he's sick and can't go out. Elaine Rogers (Kathleen Hughes) wants Bentley to join her on a weekend cruise. The problem is that he has a golf match with Chuck Forrest. Bentley tells Kelly that he will be honest with Chuck and say he wants out of the golf game. Chuck then tries to manipulate things so that Bentley keeps his golf date and Chuck can then go on the cruise with Elaine. Bentley and Elaine figure out what Chuck was up to. More deceptions and misunderstandings follow until Elaine doesn't know whom to believe. She tells Bentley and Chuck she won't go on the cruise with either of them. Later, something happens and Elaine knows Bentley was telling the truth.
116	39	"Bentley's Barbecue"	Earl Bellamy	Seaman Jacobs & Si Rose	June 22, 1961
Bentley wants to relax outside, but he's getting wet from Cal's new sprinkler system. There's a heat wave in the town and Peter would like Bentley to put in an air conditioner. Kelly tells Bentley that she needs a big new barbecue for her upcoming party. Bentley tells Kelly and Howard to build their own barbecue. Bentley decides to help them. Jasper is missing and the family thinks he may be in the finished brick barbecue. Bentley bashes open the barbecue and no Jasper. Jasper does show up. The family builds a new barbecue and tests it out. Something goes wrong and there's smoke everywhere. Mr. Bostwick (Olan Soule), from air pollution control, comes by. Bostwick thinks the barbecue is an incinerator and demands it be torn down. Bentley demands Cal tear out his sprinkler. Bentley decides to build another barbecue in a different location. Cal suggests a location for Bentley's new barbecue only to demand Bentley tear it down again. Kelly winds up having her party indoors. When Peter shows Bentley an air conditioner he could build himself, Bentley says they'll have one professionally installed.
117	40	"Drop That Calorie"	Earl Bellamy	Bob Fisher & Alan Lipscott	July 6, 1961
After something that Ginger says about a dress Kelly has on, Kelly is concerned about her weight. She asks Bentley if he thinks she's fat, but he evades the question. Kelly starts exercising. After something that Kelly says to Peter, he starts exercising. They both sign up for Spring Loring's (Lori Nelson) weight reducing course. Bentley thinks they paid too much for the course and will talk to Spring Loring to get their money back. Bentley meets the attractive Miss Loring and changes his mind. When he fails to lift a weight, Bentley signs up for the course as well. Spring talks Bentley into buying a lot of health food. Bentley invites Spring over for dinner. Kelly and Peter are not thrilled about the health food, but they all make a pact to not eat anything else. Bentley and Kelly fantasize about eating real food. Peter bakes a ham and claims he's just keeping in practice. Bentley says it would be a shame to waste it, but Peter says he'll feed it to Jasper. They all cave in and eat the ham. Bentley goes to confess to Spring and he catches her eating a chocolate bar. Mary Treen as Spa Receptionist.

=== Season 5 (1961–62) ===
No. overall	No. in season	Title	Directed by	Written by	Original release date
118	1	"Kelly's Graduation"	Earl Bellamy	Bob Fisher & Alan Lipscott	September 21, 1961
Kelly is picked to be class valedictorian. Bentley and Peter talk about how soon she'll graduate college and get married. Kelly is practicing her speech. Bentley wants her to go to a Cal State, while her and Ginger where thinking of going out of state. Bentley starts to meddle with Kelly's speech and what she'll be wearing. He does keep saying that she should do what she wants, but clearly is trying to influence her. Peter lets it slip that Bentley was going to give her a surprise party, but she had other plans. She agrees to the party. Bentley invites Kelly's teacher Janice McCleery (Joan O'Brien) over, hoping she will talk Kelly into going to Cal State. Janice notices the subtle way Bentley tries to influence Kelly. Bentley and Janice then go out and everything that he wants to do, she makes another suggestion. It's not until Bentley tells Peter about his frustrating evening that he gets Janice's message that he is interfering in Kelly's life. Bentley tells Kelly that he wants her to do what she wants to do. Kelly gives her speech and mentions how much she admires her Uncle Bentley. Charlotte Stewart as Maybelle.
119	2	"The King's English"	Earl Bellamy	Dan Beaumont	October 3, 1961
Peter signs up for night-school courses. Peter must pass an English exam to stay with his class. Jeanne Bal as Suzanne Collins. Joey Faye as Danny.
120	3	"Rush Week"	Greg Garrison	Jess Carneol & Kay Lenard	October 10, 1961
Kelly and Ginger have made a pact to join the same college sorority, but each is being rushed by a different house. Lisa Gaye as Cordelia.
121	4	"Kelly and the Freethinker"	John Newland	Sheridan Gibney	October 17, 1961
Kelly wants to join a Philosophical Club at college. She is really taken with one of the members, Steve Wallace (Charles Knox Robinson). Kelly keeps seeing Steve at the malt shop and fantasizes about a way for her to meet him. She is finally able to ask Steve a question. Steve comes by the house to take Kelly out and get to know her better. Bentley is not as impressed with Steve as Kelly is. Steve brings Kelly home very late and Bentley is not happy. Howard tells Bentley he's concerned about Kelly as she is not keeping up with her other classes. Kelly starts to question life and reality and spends a lot of time with Steve. Bentley comes up with a plan to have Howard show that Steve is just full of hot air. Kelly gives up Steve and would rather be with Howard. Herb Vigran as The Proprietor of the Malt Shop.
122	5	"A Party for Peter"	Earl Bellamy	Seaman Jacobs & Si Rose	October 24, 1961
Peter has a crush on supermarket clerk Helen but she's devoted to pop singer Frankie Laine. Peter thinks if he can get the crooner to appear at a party it will help him out so he asks for Bentley's aid in making it happen. Jerry Fujikawa as Arthur Wing.
123	6	"Never Steal an Owl"	Earl Bellamy	George Carleton Brown & Frank Gill Jr.	October 31, 1961
City College, a rival school, has been white washing several artifacts at Kelly's college. Bentley was invited to lecture at the college and gets white washed as well. To get even, Kelly and Howard (Jimmy Boyd) suggest stealing City College's mascot, a stuffed owl. Bentley says if they get into trouble they shouldn't come to him. That night, Howard goes to City College. While looking for the right building, he bumps into Dean Westbrook (Willis Bouchey). Westbrook sees a Cal State sticker on Howard's car. He warns John Wills (Charles Seel), a caretaker, that they may be trying to get the stuffed owl. An alarm goes off and Howard fails at getting the owl. But when he returns to Kelly, they find the owl in his car. A Policeman (House Peters Jr.) arrives and arrests Howard on theft and arson charges. After Kelly and Peter do something, Bentley reluctantly agrees to defend Howard in court. In court, things don't look good for Howard. The next day, however, Bentley figures out who the real culprit is and Howard is exonerated. Maurice Manson as Judge Whiting.
124	7	"Bentley's Catered Affair"	Earl Bellamy	Bob Fisher & Alan Lipscott	November 7, 1961
Bentley is trying to get Nora Ferris (Patricia Donahue) from the Zoning Commission to re-zone some land for a client of his. Meanwhile, Kelly wants to get a car of her own. Bentley will put up half the money for the car and Kelly says she'll earn the other half. Kelly, Howard, and Peter go into the food catering business. Peter was going to only provide the recipes, but he winds up doing the cooking as well. Bentley says he'll buy Kelly the car and wants the three to close their business. Howard says they can't shut down as they have a contract with a fraternity for a large order. Bentley hopes to find a loophole in the contract, but he doesn't. Nora tells Bentley she heard that there's a catering business running in a residential area and she will throw the book at them. Nora finds out that the business is in Bentley's house. Bentley finds a loophole to stay out of trouble. H.W. Gim as Gregory.
125	8	"The House at Smuggler's Cove"	Earl Bellamy	Calvin Clements Sr. (t); Dick Conway & Roland MacLane (s/t)	November 14, 1961
Bentley is going to investigate a claim that one of his client's houses is haunted, greatly depressing its value. He intends to spend the night in the house proving it's not haunted. Kelly would like to go with, but Bentley says no. Kelly lets Bentley leave, knowing he forgot the keys. Kelly asks Peter to drive her to the house. Bentley meets real estate agent Marilyn Marsh (Elizabeth Allen), who lets him into the house. A Mr. Purvis is also there and he put in a very low bid for the home. Bentley meets Mrs. Trindle (Dorothea Neumann), who is the housekeeper. She also believes the house is haunted. Marilyn tells Bentley there's no power to the house and leaves. Peter and Kelly arrive. Bentley mentions that he knows there was electricity because he's been paying the bills. Marilyn said there are 13 rooms, but Bentley was told by the owner there are 14. Bentley sends Peter and Kelly home, but they come back because of a storm. Strange things start to happen. Marilyn and Purvis return. Bentley figures out what the haunting was and it involves Mr. Trindle (Dick Elliott).
126	9	"Peter's Punctured Wedding"	Earl Bellamy	Seaman Jacobs & Si Rose	November 21, 1961
Due to an old Chinese family contract entered into by Peter's parents when he was born, he must marry a certain young woman who is now old enough to wed. This means that he must quit his job as houseboy. Victor Sen Yung as Cousin Charlie. Beal Wong as Grandpa Ling. Judy Dan as Lu San. Aki Aleong as Cousin Richard. Beulah Quo as Aunt Rose.
127	10	"Star Light, Star Not So Bright"	Earl Bellamy	Jim Allen & R.S. Allen	November 28, 1961
Bentley's client tries to interest him in astrology.
128	11	"Bentley and the Timeclock"	Earl Bellamy	Jim Allen & R.S. Allen (t); Elroy Schwartz (s/t) & Glenn Wheaton (s/t)	December 5, 1961
Peter wants to meet up with Cousin Charlie, but Bentley doesn't want to let him go. Every time Peter hooks up with Charlie it costs Peter and Bentley money. Charlie comes by and tells Peter about his latest idea, the BSCH - the Benevolent Society of Chinese Houseboys. At their first meeting, Peter is made president. Peter gives Bentley a list of labor demands. The next day, Bentley has a talk with Charlie, but nothing is resolved. That night, Bentley has Patricia Townsend over for dinner. Bentley sees another houseboy writing things down. Peter tells Bentley that's Gregory (H.W. Gim), the BSCH checker. Charlie hears that Bentley kicked Gregory out. He tells Peter he has to go on strike until Bentley signs a contract. Bentley tells Kelly he'll sign the contract and teach Peter a lesson by following it to the letter. Peter soon decides he liked things the way they were before.
129	12	"Birth of a Song"	Earl Bellamy	Bob Fisher & Alan Lipscott	December 12, 1961
Peter and Kelly listen to Howard sing a song he wrote. They, however, are not impressed. Bentley tells Peter that recording artist Penny Patterson (Patti Page) will be coming by for some legal help. Penny arrives to the house before Bentley. Howard is in the back yard playing his guitar. Penny says that she would like to hear his song. She tells Howard to write more from the heart. Bentley shows up and tells Penny her contract can't be broken. In the contract though, Penny can pick her own music. Bentley says that they'll use Howard's song and Willie Piper (Sid Tomack), of the record company, might then break the contract. To everyone's surprise, Willie agrees to the song. Everyone knows the song is bad, so both Penny and Willie are waiting each other out. Howard overhears Penny and Bentley talk about not wanting to hurt Howard. Howard figures out a way for Penny to get a new contract and everything else she's wants. Lennie Weinrib as Lowell.
130	13	"Deck the Halls"	Stanley Z. Cherry	Jim Allen & R.S. Allen	December 19, 1961
Bentley, tired of the Christmas rush tries to sell his family and friends on the true meaning of the holiday by donating in their names money to charity instead of giving gifts. Joey Faye as Danny. Lennie Weinrib as The Clerk.
131	14	"The Law and Kelly Gregg"	Stanley Z. Cherry	Jim Allen & R.S. Allen	December 26, 1961
Kelly is taking an aptitude test and Bentley is hoping it will reveal that she would make a good lawyer. Bentley is working on a case with lawyer Madeline Wainwright (Elizabeth Allen). Their client is Mrs. Hadley and they have a star witness in her favor. That night at dinner, Kelly tells Bentley her test shows she has a flair for journalism. She has to write a paper and Bentley tricks her into spending the day at his office, hoping she will find law interesting. Kelly has a boring time. Madeline comes by and tells Bentley that their star witness won't testify. They leave and Kelly stays at the office. Madeline's handsome brother Paul (Bill Bixby), who is studying law, comes by. Paul and Kelly go to speak with Mr. Dundy (William Fawcett), the witness. Meanwhile, the court case has started and things are not going well for Bentley. It takes some doing, but Paul and Kelly get Dundy to testify. Bentley and Madeline win their case. But now all Kelly talks about is law and Bentley wishes she's think about journalism again. Sally Mansfield as Connie. Jonathan Hole as Mr. Cribbens.
132	15	"How to Throw Your Voice"	Earl Bellamy	Shirley Gordon	January 2, 1962
Kelly teaches Howard ventriloquism.
133	16	"Kelly the Yes Man"	Stanley Z. Cherry	Dan Beaumont & Ben Starr	January 9, 1962
Ginger is trying to get Kelly to ask Bentley if he could get movie star Kim Fontaine (Leslie Parrish) to come to their college dance. Ginger also suggests that Kelly run for class vice-president and getting Kim to show up could win her votes. Bentley asks Kim and she says yes. Without asking him first, Kelly volunteers Peter's cooking for a reception before the dance. She then tells people she can get Howard's combo to play for nothing. Kelly does get the vice president nomination. She asks Bentley if he could get his magazine friend to cover the dance. Bentley makes a deal that Kim doesn't like and he tells Kelly not to count on her showing up to the dance. Kelly talks Bentley into trying to patch things up with Kim. She also asks Bentley to get lighting and sound equipment for the dance. Peter tells Bentley that he is letting Kelly buy popularity with promises. Bentley comes up with a plan to teach Kelly a lesson, but it falls apart. At first Kelly is very upset that they thought she was trying to buy votes. But then Kelly realizes Bentley was right. She tells the committee she can still provide Kim, Peter and Howard, but she takes her name off for vice president.
134	17	"Gold in Them Hills"	Earl Bellamy	Seaman Jacobs & Si Rose	January 16, 1962
Peter tells Bentley that he bought five acres of commercial property for $60 an acre. Bentley is a little skeptical about what seems like another of Peter's get rich quick schemes. They drive out to see the land and discover it's near an abandoned gold prospecting town. While looking in an empty hotel, they run into an old man named Jake Larkin who is searching for gold. Jake offers to tell them where to find gold in exchange for Bentley's spare tire. Bentley says no, but when they get back to the car, the tire is gone. Back at home, Peter says no more get rich schemes. Repairman Joe (Frank Sully) gives Bentley a small pouch he found while putting in the new spare tire. There's a small amount of gold in it that Jake must have left for them. Peter thinks he'll find more gold on his land and will be rich. Bentley has mining engineer Jeff Porter check the land and he says there really isn't any gold left on the land. Bentley drives Peter, Kelly and Howard back to the land to let them look for gold. After a days work, they find 80 cents worth of gold, but they want to try again the next day. They run into Jake again. Jake tells them he's been prospecting for 37 years and he knows he'll hit it big one day. Peter decides to give up on striking it rich, until he gets a call from Cousin Charlie with another scheme.
135	18	"How Howard Won His C"	Earl Bellamy	Seaman Jacobs & Si Rose	January 23, 1962
Kelly is spending time with college sports star Biff Merideth (Joby Baker). Howard tells Bentley that Kelly likes Biff because he has 6 varsity letters. Howard feels bad because he doesn't have any. He's tried out for every team, but hasn't made it. Bentley says that he got a letter for being on the fencing team. Bentley agrees to teach fencing to Howard. Howard gets to be pretty good. Howard learns that the college doesn't have a fencing team. Bentley and Howard speak with Athletic Director Don Lambert (Fredd Wayne). He says that if Howard can round up enough other players, he'll reactivate the sport. Howard gets the players and Don makes Bentley the temporary coach. Much to Howard's dismay, Biff wants to join the fencing team. During practices, Biff continually teases Howard. It turns out that Howard has to compete against Biff to make the team. Kelly is afraid Howard will get hurt and tries to talk him out of it. Howard dreams that he fences with Biff and Biff stabs him. After Kelly gives him a good luck charm, Howard beats Biff in their match. Biff actually congratulates Howard.
136	19	"Pinch That Penny"	Earl Bellamy	Bob Fisher & Alan Lipscott	January 30, 1962
Bentley looks over a contract that butler Rochester Van Jones (Eddie "Rochester" Anderson) has with Jack Benny. Peter buys an electric door knob polisher from salesman Dorian Skagg (George O. Petrie). Tired of the way Peter wastes money, Bentley subcontracts the services of Rochester. Bentley tells Peter that he brought in Rochester to teach him how to be more economical. Peter almost buys another silly gadget from Dorian, until Bentley stops him. Peter is annoyed with all the ways Rochester saves money and garners Bentley's praise. He also notices how many favors Rochester gets from Bentley. Peter tells Kelly that Bentley will have to choose between him and Rochester. Rochester gets turned down by his girlfriend when he suggests an inexpensive evening. Peter tells him he's going to lose many girls because he's cheap. Peter teaches Rochester how to spend money. He even gets Rochester to buy another gadget from Dorian. Bentley can't believe the change in Rochester. Bentley gets a call from Jack Benny, who is not happy with the change. Bentley straightens things out.
137	20	"Blossom Comes to Visit"	Earl Bellamy	Seaman Jacobs & Si Rose	February 6, 1962
Peter's niece Blossom (Cherylene Lee) stays with the Gregg's while her mother, who is a dancer, is entertaining overseas. Kelly invites some children over to play with Blossom. But because she spent so much time on the road with her mother, Blossom would rather do adult things. She sneaks off to be with Peter. Kelly tells Peter to stop pampering Blossom. With the other children still outside, Kelly catches Peter and Bentley singing and dancing with Blossom. Blossom says that she hates children. She claims to have a friend named Calvin. Bentley learns that Calvin is an imaginary friend. Blossom tells Bentley she won't go to school and leave Calvin alone. Bentley comes up with a plan to treat Blossom as an adult, which he believes she'll tire of. But it doesn't work. Kelly tries a much firmer approach. Bentley and Peter start to cave in when Blossom pretends to cry. Kelly's method finally gets through to Blossom. She agrees to go to school and play with the other children. Blossom tells Bentley that Calvin is gone.
138	21	"Bentley and the Homebody"	Earl Bellamy	Bob Fisher & Alan Lipscott	February 13, 1962
Bentley is looking forward to meeting a new neighbor. Maureen Arthur as Martha.
139	22	"Summer Romance"	Earl Bellamy	Sheridan Gibney	February 20, 1962
Bentley gets a letter from Kelly who is a waitress in Yellowstone Park for the summer. She mentions a Bruce Dalton (Gary Clarke), who she met there. He's studying to be a forest ranger. Peter's worried, but Bentley isn't. Bentley gets another letter and Kelly says Bruce asked her to marry him. Bentley and Peter immediately head to the park. Kelly tells them that she hasn't given Bruce an answer. Kelly introduces Bruce to Bentley and Peter. After speaking with him, Bentley knows Bruce is serious about the marriage. He tries to tell Bruce that Kelly is not the pioneer type. Bentley speaks to Loretta Prentiss (Allison Hayes) who is in charge of the girls there. She says it could just be a summer romance. That evening there's a dance at the lodge. Bentley spends time with Loretta and Peter meets Lin Sing (Maria McClay). The three couples wind up at the same cabin in the woods. Peter is frightened when he encounters a grizzly bear. After the bear leaves, they have to ride out a storm together. Kelly tells Bentley that she is staying and she has to give Bruce a chance. After a week, Kelly comes home.
140	23	"The Hong Kong Suit"	Earl Bellamy	Hannibal Coons & Charles R. Marion	February 27, 1962
Kelly wants to get something special and inexpensive for Bentley's birthday. Jay Jostyn as Mr. Grandville. Anne Whitfield as Cynthia Grandville.
141	24	"Will Success Spoil Jasper?"	Hollingsworth Morse	Seaman Jacobs & Si Rose	March 6, 1962
Jasper's couch-jumping lands him in the doghouse, until he becomes top dog by getting a job doing it in show business. Leonid Kinskey as Boris Dobkin. George N. Neise as Arnold Lloyd.
142	25	"Strictly Business"	Earl Bellamy	Dan Beaumont, Larry Williams & Maggie Williams	March 13, 1962
Bentley gets a letter from the Internal Revenue Service. It says that Mr. Dalrymple (Vaughn Taylor) will be coming to speak with Bentley about a discrepancy in his tax return from 1958. Bentley says he has nothing to worry about. But, he cuts a golf game short to run to the office and check his books. Bentley finds a few loose ends, one of which involves Howard. Bentley needs a contract that he wrote up for Howard back then. Another loose end involved Constance Marlow (Marcia Henderson). He needs her to sign a letter saying many of their dates included business discussions. Things get confusing when Grandpa Ling tries to explain a will to Mr. Dalrymple at his office. When Mr. Dalrymple comes to Bentley's house, none of the loose ends have been tied up. Turns out all of Bentley's panicking was for nothing. Mr. Dalrymple says that Bentley over paid that year and hands him a check.
143	26	"On the Old Camp Ground"	Abby Berlin	Seaman Jacobs & Si Rose	March 20, 1962
To convince Kelly, Ginger and Mrs. Mitchell that camping out would be fun, Bentley, Cal and Peter challenge them to spend a few nights in sleeping bags in the Gregg backyard. They agree to this, but scheme to get out of it.
144	27	"A Visit to the Bergens"	Earl Bellamy	Seaman Jacobs & Si Rose	March 27, 1962
Bentley is upset because Peter bought another worthless gadget from a Salesman (Jerry Hausner). Judy Sinclair (Barbara Bostock), and then Alice Wilson, come to Bentley's door asking if ventriloquist Edgar Bergen lives here. Meanwhile, Frances Bergen complains to Edgar because he fired their housekeeper Greta (Connie Gilchrist). Bentley stops by the Bergen house for a visit. Alice and Judy are there. They were rehearsing with Edgar for his TV special. When Frances mentions they're looking for a housekeeper, Bentley offers Peter's help. The Salesman comes to the Bergen house and Peter talks Edgar into buying the gadget. Bentley and Peter have another argument about the gadgets and Peter quits. Bentley thinks he's bluffing. Peter goes to work for the Bergen's. An agency sends Greta over to Bentley's home. Peter's gadgets are starting to annoy Edgar. Both Peter and Greta would like to go back to their former employers. Kelly and Frances come up with a plan to make that happen.
145	28	"The Richest Cat"	Earl Bellamy	Sloan Nibley	April 3, 1962
During the night, a storm wakes Bentley, Kelly and Peter up. They hear a meow and find a cat and her kittens in the basement. Bentley tells Kelly to not get attached to them. The next day Bentley's neighbor Cal Mitchell (Del Moore) reads in the paper about a cat named Sally that has inherited its owner's million-dollar fortune. Bentley tells Kelly to call some pet shops to give the cats to. Cal visits Bentley and realizes that the cat is the one from the paper. Cal offers to take the cats off Bentley's hands and, not having seen the paper, Bentley agrees. After Cal leaves, Bentley sees the story in the paper. Bentley goes to Cal's house and gets the cats back. He then calls the people handling the estate and a Miss Webster comes by to pick up the cats. Miss Webster says that the cat is not Sally. A call comes to the house and Miss Webster learns that the real Sally came back home. Bentley asks pretty Miss Webster out to dinner. Bentley then brings the cats to Cal and says he can keep them. Cal also finds out the truth about the cat and they wind up at Bentley's door step. Evelyn Scott as Adelaide Mitchell.
146	29	"The Twain Shall Meet"	Earl Bellamy	Bob Fisher & Alan Lipscott	April 10, 1962
When a Chinese tradition keeps Mei Lan from seeing her boyfriend Leo Toy, Kelly and Peter try to arrange a secret meeting for the young couple - right under disapproving Bentley's nose. Bart Burns as Sgt. Hoffman. Frank Bank as Jim Estabrook. Benson Fong as Mr. Chang.
147	30	"Bentley Goes to Bat"	Earl Bellamy	Bob Fisher & Alan Lipscott	April 17, 1962
Bentley is assigned the task of taking the tomboy out of a Los Angeles Dodgers third-base coach's doting daughter. Wally Moon as self. Frank Maxwell as Andy Hartzell. Bart Patton as Rick. Stuffy Singer as Larry. Candy Moore as Phyllis Hartzell.
148	31	"Kelly's Engagement"	Earl Bellamy	William Raynor & Myles Wilder	April 24, 1962
Fresh out of law school, Warren Dawson (Aron Kincaid) wants to join Bentley's law office. Bentley says that unfortunately he is a one man operation. Kelly shows up and meets Warren. Warren offers to go to court with Kelly to fight a ticket she got. It's been a month and Warren and Kelly are spending a lot of time together. Kelly receives a proposal of marriage from Warren and she says yes. Something Peter says makes Bentley suspect Warren only proposed to gain a foot hold into Bentley's practice. Bentley offers Warren a job if he postpones getting married, which Warren agrees to. Bentley is now sure Warren only wanted the job. Bentley tries to over work Warren hoping he will quit. But Warren at first handles everything that's given him with no problem. Warren tells Kelly that all Bentley does is give him busy work. After Warren deliberately sets off to get fired, Bentley has a talk with him. Bentley tells Warren that he misjudged him. Neil Hamilton as Mr. Kendricks.
149	32	"Kelly, the Home Executive"	Earl Bellamy	Jim Allen, R.S. Allen & Mel Diamond	May 1, 1962
Bentley and Peter talk about how well Kelly and Warren get along. But then the couple have their first fight when he implied that she can't cook. Kelly tells Bentley that she might not be good enough for Warren. He says that she can learn to cook and anything else she may need to do. But she won't apologize to him. Bentley talks to Warren and he won't apologize. Kelly prepares several meals that aren't very good. But to boost her confidence, Bentley and Peter lie and say they are excellent. Bentley gets Warren and Kelly together and they make up. Warren's parents, Myrtle (Sheila Bromley) and Horace Dawson (David Lewis), are coming to visit. Kelly is worried because Warren always says what a great cook his mother is. When Peter doesn't want to cook what Kelly suggests, she'll cook the meal herself. The day of the dinner, things are not going well for Kelly. To make matters worse, Myrtle and Horace mistakenly arrive 3 hours early. A tearful Kelly admits she's not a homemaker and can't cook. Myrtle tells Kelly that everything she learned about cooking she got from Horace. Peter and Horace decide to help prepare dinner.
150	33	"Blossom Time at the Greggs"	Hollingsworth Morse	Seaman Jacobs & Si Rose	May 8, 1962
Peter runs for president of his lodge.
151	34	"What Men Don't Know"	Hollingsworth Morse	George Carleton Brown & Frank Gill Jr.	May 15, 1962
Kelly is upset that some blonde flattered Warren all evening at a party and he loved it. Peter tries to give her some advice on flattery and then Bentley walks in. Bentley says Kelly shouldn't be that way and that men like women who are intellectually stimulating. Bentley introduces Kelly to Barbara Thorne (Joanna Barnes), who he says is someone Kelly should be like. But Barbara spends the whole time flattering Bentley. The next morning, Kelly gives Bentley a hard time about how he fell for Barbara's flattery. Bentley suggests that Kelly know more about the things Warren is interested in. But things backfire for Kelly when she seems to know more about Warren's interests than he does. And Warren isn't happy about it. Kelly is now upset that Bentley interfered. Kelly has a talk with Barbara. Barbara comes up with a plan to give Bentley a taste of his own medicine. Bentley learns his lesson and he helps Kelly and Warren make up. Bentley and Barbara once again see eye to eye.
152	35	"Marry Thy Neighbor"	Hollingsworth Morse	Seaman Jacobs & Si Rose	May 22, 1962
Kelly is flying east to spend some time with Warren's parents. Kelly tells Peter and Bentley that she hopes they find someone to love the way she found Warren. Sue-Lin Lee (Nancy Hsueh) comes to the door. She cooks for Marlene Wetherly (Suzanne Lloyd) who just moved in across the street and would like to borrow a spice. Peter tells Bentley that it's love at first sight. Bentley meets attractive Marlene when she needs her fridge repaired. Peter tells Bentley he proposed to Sue-Lin but she didn't accept. Bentley is to have dinner at Marlene's and Peter hopes he can put in a good word for him. Now Bentley thinks he's in love with Marlene and gets engaged. But it seems that love-blind Peter and Bentley are being manipulated by the women. The men come up with a plan to become bachelors again. Fredd Wayne as Roger Dunlap.
153	36	"Bentley Takes It Easy"	Earl Bellamy	Mel Diamond (t) & Seaman Jacobs (s/t) & Si Rose (s/t)	May 29, 1962
Lately, Bentley's been very overworked. With Kelly's encouragement, Bentley decides to take a week off and spend it relaxing at home. Unfortunately, Bentley starts to nit-pick at everything Peter and Kelly do. He even causes Julio the gardener (Pedro Gonzalez Gonzalez) to quit. Bentley says that the family can do the gardening. Bentley spends a lot of money on garden supplies. They create more damage than planting. Kelly, Ginger and Margo are planning a surprise party for Janet. Bentley interrupts their discussion and starts talking about outer space. Peter and Kelly are at their breaking point. Peter comes up with a plan to get Bentley back to work. Every time Bentley suggests something, Peter and Kelly say they've already done it. Warren comes by saying there's a problem with one of the lawsuits. Bentley feels needed and heads back to the office. Back at home, Bentley is more relaxed.
154	37	"Boys Will Be"	Earl Bellamy	Jess Carneol (s/t) & Kay Lenard (s/t) & Larry Rhine (t)	June 5, 1962
Louise Spencer (Kathleen Hughes) tries to talk Bentley into organizing activities for a group of boys. The boys have been in and out of trouble. Bentley talks to them for a little while, but then goes off to play golf. When Bentley gets home a boy named Steve (Tom Nolan) is still there. Steve says he'd wants to be a lawyer because he likes all of the flashy things Bentley owns. Bentley brings the boys to court to watch the proceedings. At first Judge Blandon is happy to have the boys there. But after they leave, the Judge notices his prized golf trophy has been stolen. Bentley assures the Judge he will get the trophy back. That night, Steve brings the trophy to Bentley, but says he didn't take it. He doesn't want to say who did it and leaves. Bentley talks to Louise and still believes Steve did it. Steve comes by and says that Marvin took it. Bentley decides to hold a trial at his house with Judge Blandon. Steve acts as the defense attorney and brings in a surprise witness. An interesting bit of information comes out at the trial and Marvin's punishment is that he has to kiss Kelly. Dennis Joel as Mickey. Bart Braverman as Joey. Bobby Clark as Ernie Smith.
155	38	"Divided House"	Earl Bellamy	Mel Diamond	June 12, 1962
Warren's preparing a lawsuit against his father's company.
156	39	"Peter, the Medicine Man"	Earl Bellamy	Everett Freeman & Larry Rhine	June 19, 1962
Peter has become engrossed by his favorite TV show, Dr. Bart Bellamy, M.D. (John Gabriel). He even starts acting like Dr. Bellamy. When Blossom sneezes a couple times, Peter says he has to examine her. Bentley calls Dr. Whittaker (Parley Baer) and he says her tonsils may need to come out. Blossom says she doesn't want to go to the hospital. Peter tries to tell her how nice it will be. Dr. Whittaker comes by again and says the tonsils will definitely have to come out. Blossom tells Whittaker that she will go to the hospital. But then the doctor finds that Peter also needs his tonsils out. Peter says he's not going. At the hospital, Peter won't sign a consent form. Peter tells Bentley he's afraid. It takes some doing, but Bentley talks Peter into signing the form. Peter has Bentley draw up a will for him. Blossom's operation goes smoothly. Dr. Whittaker tells Bentley that Peter is not in the right frame of mind. Bentley gets the actor who plays Dr. Bellamy to talk Peter into having the operation.
157	40	"Curfew Shall Not Ring Tonight"	Earl Bellamy	Bob Fisher & Alan Lipscott	June 26, 1962
Bentley takes Kelly to her new apartment near campus. She'll be staying there with Ginger and Corrine (Maggie Pierce). When they arrive, they meet Carl (Norm Grabowski), Joby (Robert Ivers) and Rick, who live in the building next door. Bentley and Kelly meet Miss Sharkey (Jane Withers), the landlady, who apparently is very strict. Bentley worries about Kelly, but Peter tells him she's a big girl and he should enjoy being a bachelor again. Corrine tells the girls that she is engaged to Eric Miller. Corrine also mentions that no boys are allowed in the house after 9 o'clock. That evening Bentley has a date with Daphne. Joby and Rick come by to pick up something for Kelly. When Daphne says they were cute, Bentley worries about Kelly again. He takes Daphne to Kelly's place so he can check on her. Peter shows up as well. Corrine and Eric want an apartment of their own, but can't afford it. Joby mentions this to Bentley because he knows Bentley would like for Kelly to come home. Joby also has another reason. Bentley finds out a secret about Miss Sharkey. Bentley convinces Miss Sharkey to let Corrine and Eric stay at Corrine's place and Kelly and Ginger would come home.

== Production notes ==
Bachelor Father was filmed at Revue Studios. It was primarily sponsored by American Tobacco (Tareyton cigarettes) and American Home Products Corporation (Anacin, Dristan and Chef Boyardee) throughout its original run. The series was produced by Forsythe's "Bachelor Productions" in association with MCA's Revue Studios. Bachelor Father pilot and broadcast season were produced by Harry Ackerman, who left Revue/MCA after the first season to produce other sitcoms like Hazel, Bewitched and I Dream of Jeannie for Screen Gems/Columbia. He was later replaced by Everett Freeman for the rest of the show's run.

== Syndication ==
Reruns of Bachelor Father were syndicated on the Retro Television Network until October 2011. The show then began airing on Antenna TV but has remained off schedule from January 2015 to January 2022 until it was brought back later that month. As of January 26, they have since removed the show from their lineup again.
