= Lee Marvin on screen and stage =

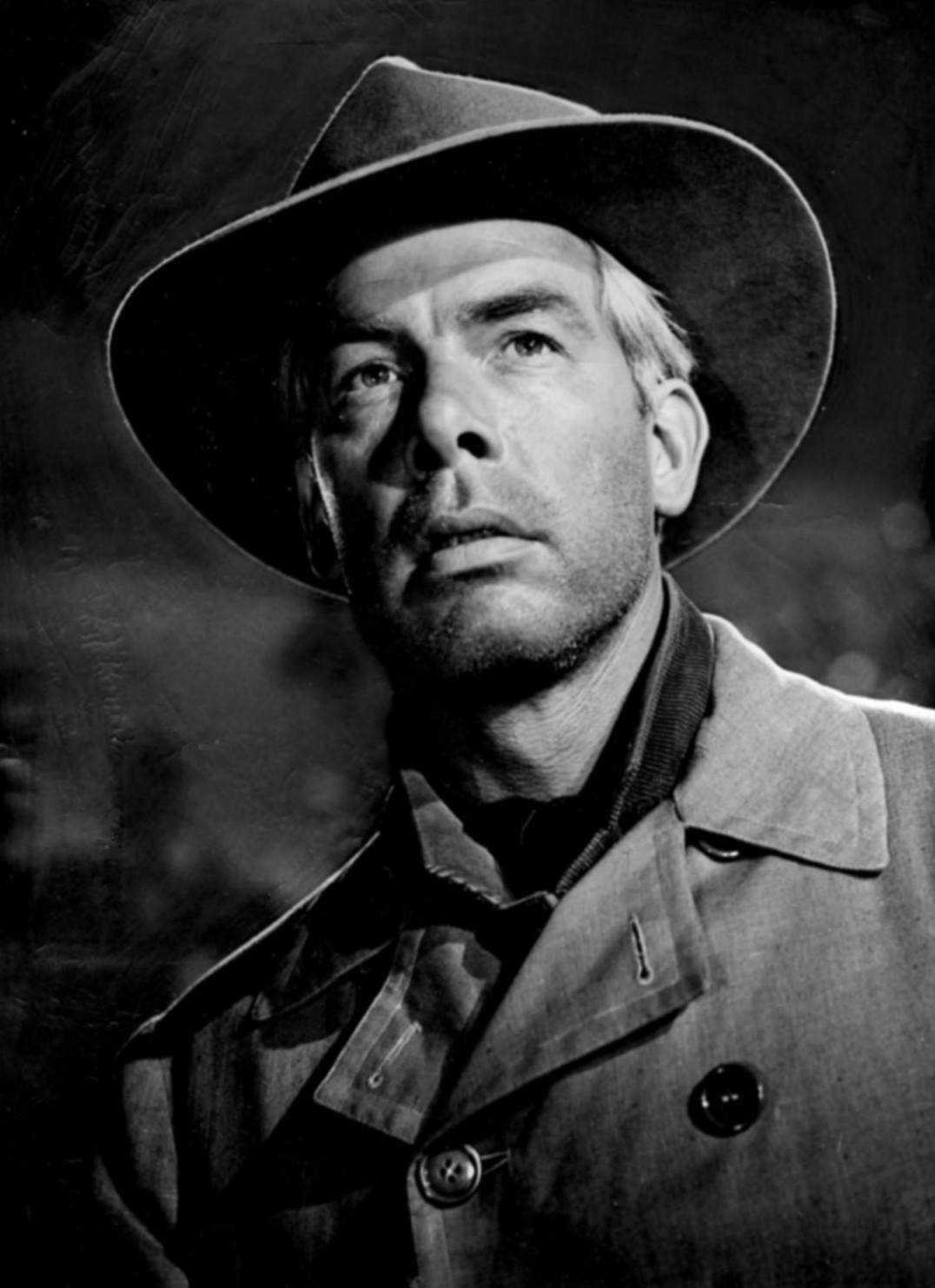
Lee Marvin acting in the Twilight Zone (1961)

Lee Marvin (February 19, 1924 – August 29, 1987) was an American film and television actor. Known for his bass voice and premature white hair, he is best remembered for playing hardboiled "tough guy" characters. Although initially typecast as the "heavy" (i.e. villainous character), he later gained prominence for portraying anti-heroes, such as Detective Lieutenant Frank Ballinger on the television series M Squad (1957–1960). Marvin's notable roles in film included: Charlie Strom in The Killers (1964), Rico Fardan in The Professionals (1966), Major John Reisman in The Dirty Dozen (1967), Ben Rumson in Paint Your Wagon (1969), Walker in Point Blank (1967) and the Sergeant in The Big Red One (1980).

Marvin achieved numerous accolades when he portrayed both gunfighter Kid Shelleen and criminal Tim Strawn in a dual role for the comedy Western film Cat Ballou (1965), alongside Jane Fonda, a surprise hit which won him the Academy Award for Best Actor, along with a BAFTA Award, a Golden Globe Award, an NBR Award and the Silver Bear for Best Actor.

== Filmography ==
=== Film ===
Year	Title	Role	Notes	Ref.
1951	You're in the Navy Now	Radio Man	Uncredited	
1951	Teresa	G.I.	Uncredited	
1952	Diplomatic Courier	MP at Trieste	Uncredited	
1952	We're Not Married!	"Pinky"	Uncredited	
1952	The Duel at Silver Creek	Tinhorn Burgess		
1952	Hangman's Knot	Rolph Bainter		
1952	Eight Iron Men	Sgt. Joe Mooney		
1953	Down Among the Sheltering Palms	Pvt. Snively	Uncredited	
1953	Seminole	Sgt. Magruder		
1953	The Glory Brigade	Cpl. Bowman		
1953	The Stranger Wore a Gun	Dan Kurth		
1953	The Big Heat	Vince Stone		
1953	Gun Fury	Blinky		
1953	The Wild One	Chino		
1954	Gorilla at Large	Shaughnessy, Policeman		
1954	The Caine Mutiny	"Meatball"		
1954	The Raid	Lt. Keating		
1955	Bad Day at Black Rock	Hector David		
1955	Violent Saturday	Dill, Bank Robber		
1955	Not as a Stranger	Brundage		
1955	A Life in the Balance	The Killer		
1955	Pete Kelly's Blues	Al Gannaway		
1955	I Died a Thousand Times	Babe Kossuck		
1955	Shack Out on 101	Slob / Mr. Gregory		
1956	Seven Men from Now	Bill Masters	Made by Batjac Productions, John Wayne's company.	
1956	Attack	Lt. Col. Clyde Bartlett		
1956	Pillars of the Sky	Sergeant Lloyd Carracart		
1956	The Rack	Capt. John R. Miller		
1957	Raintree County	Orville "Flash" Perkins	Nominated—Laurel Award for Best Male Supporting Performance	
1958	The Missouri Traveler	Tobias Brown		
1961	The Comancheros	Tully Crow	Nominated—Laurel Award for Best Male Supporting Performance	
1962	The Man Who Shot Liberty Valance	Liberty Valance	Bronze Wrangler for Best Theatrical Motion Picture Nominated—Laurel Award for Best Action Performance	
1963	Donovan's Reef	Thomas Aloysius "Boats" Gilhooley		
1964	The Killers	Charlie Strom	BAFTA Award for Best Actor in a Leading Role (also for Cat Ballou) Nominated—Laurel Award for Best Action Performance	
1965	Cat Ballou	Kid Shelleen and Tim Strawn	Academy Award for Best Actor BAFTA Award for Best Actor in a Leading Role (also for The Killers) Golden Globe Award for Best Actor – Motion Picture Musical or Comedy Laurel Award for Best Male Comedy Performance National Board of Review Award for Best Actor (also for Ship of Fools) Silver Bear for Best Actor Nominated—New York Film Critics Circle Award for Best Actor	
1965	Ship of Fools	Bill Tenny	National Board of Review Award for Best Actor (also for Cat Ballou)	
1966	The Professionals	Henry "Rico" Fardan	Laurel Award for Best Action Performance	
1967	The Dirty Dozen	Major John Reisman	Laurel Award for Best Action Performance	
1967	Point Blank	Walker		
1968	Hell in the Pacific	American Pilot		
1969	Paint Your Wagon	Ben Rumson	Nominated—Golden Globe Award for Best Actor – Motion Picture Musical or Comedy	
1970	Monte Walsh	Monte Walsh	Fotogramas de Plata Award for Best Foreign Performer Nominated—Laurel Award for Best Action Performance	
1972	Pocket Money	Leonard		
1972	Prime Cut	Nick Devlin		
1973	Emperor of the North Pole	A No. 1		
1973	The Iceman Cometh	Hickey		
1974	The Spikes Gang	Harry Spikes		
1974	The Klansman	Sheriff Track Bascomb		
1976	Shout at the Devil	Col. Flynn O'Flynn		
1976	The Great Scout & Cathouse Thursday	Sam Longwood		
1979	Avalanche Express	Col. Harry Wargrave		
1980	The Big Red One	The Sergeant		
1981	Death Hunt	Sergeant Edgar Millen		
1983	Gorky Park	Jack Osborne		
1984	Dog Day	Jimmy Cobb	French title: Canicule	
1986	The Delta Force	Col. Nick Alexander	(final film role)	

=== Television ===
Year	Title	Role	Notes	Ref.
1950	Escape		Episode: "Whappernocker Song"	
1950	The Big Story		Episode: "Eugene Travis, Memphis Tennessee Reporter"	
1950	Treasury Men in Action		Episode: "The Case of the Deadly Fish"	
1950–1953	Suspense	Barrow	2 episodes	
1952	Rebound	Sgt. Krone / Bull	2 episodes	
1952	Fireside Theatre		Episode: "Sound in the Night"	
1952	Biff Baker, U.S.A.	Michler / Captain Hollis	Episode: "Alpine Assignment"	
1952–1953	Dragnet	James Mitchell / Henry Ross	2 episodes	
1953	The Doctor		Episode: "The Runaways"	
1953	The Revlon Mirror Theater	Red Johnson	Episode: "Lullaby"	
1953	The Motorola Television Hour		Episode: "Outlaw's Reckoning"	
1953	Plymouth Playhouse		Episode: "Outlaw's Reckoning"	
1954	The Pepsi-Cola Playhouse	John Temple	2 episodes	
1954	Center Stage	Zach Toombs	Episode: "The Day Before Atlanta"	
1954	Medic	Larry Collins	Episode: "White Is the Color"	
1954–1959	Schlitz Playhouse of Stars	Jim Patterson / Russ Anderson	3 episodes	
1954–1961	General Electric Theater	Sid Benton / Clerk / Joe Kittridge / Dick Giles / Art Temple / Captain Morrissey	7 episodes	
1955	TV Reader's Digest	Charlie Faust	Episode: "How Charlie Faust Won a Pennant for the Giants"	
1955	Fireside Theatre	Jigger	Episode: "Little Guy"	
1955	Studio One	Teale	Episode: "Shakedown Cruise"	
1955–1958	Climax!	Mannon Tate / 'Little Man' Brush / Charter Plane Pilot / Capt. Cavallero	4 episodes	
1956	Kraft Television Theatre	Milo Bogardus	Episode: "The Fool Killer"	
1956	Front Row Center	David Hawken	Episode: "Dinner Date"	
1957	Studio 57		Episode: "You Take Ballistics"	
1957	The United States Steel Hour		Episode: "Shadow of Evil"	
1957–1960	M Squad	Detective Lt. Frank Ballinger / Lt. Frank Ballinger / Barney	117 episodes	
1959	Westinghouse Desilu Playhouse	Captain David Roberts	Episode: "Man in Orbit"	
1960	NBC Sunday Showcase	Ira Hayes	Episode: "The American"	
1960–1961	Wagon Train	Jud Benedict / Jose Morales	2 episodes	
1961	Route 66	John Ryan / Woody Biggs	2 episodes	
1961	The Barbara Stanwyck Show	Jud Hollister	Episode: "Confession"	
1961	The Americans	Capt. Judd	Episode: "Reconnaissance"	
1961	Checkmate	Lee Tabor	Episode: "Jungle Castle"	
1961	Alcoa Premiere	Hughes	Episode: "People Need People" Nominated—Primetime Emmy Award for Outstanding Single Performance by an Actor in a Leading Role	
1961	The Investigators	"Nostradamus" (Walter Mimms)	Episode: "The Oracle"	
1961–1962	The Untouchables	Mike Brannon / Victor Rait / Howard Carson / Nick Acropolis	3 episodes	
1961–1963	The Twilight Zone	Sam "Steel" Kelly / Conny Miller	Episodes: "The Grave" and "Steel"	
1962	Ben Casey	Gerry Bramson	Episode: "A Story to Be Softly Told"	
1962	Bonanza	Peter Kane	Episode: "The Crucible"	
1962	The DuPont Show of the Week	Juan de Nuñez	Episode: "The Richest Man in Bogotá"	
1962	The Virginian	Martin Kalig	Episode: "It Tolls for Thee"	
1962–1964	Dr. Kildare	Buddy Bishop / Dr. Paul Probeck	2 episodes	
1963	The Dick Powell Show	Finn / Dave Blassingame	2 episodes	
1963	Combat!	Sgt. Turk	Episode: "The Bridge at Châlons"	
1963	Kraft Suspense Theatre	Sgt. Paul Ryker	2 episodes	
1963	The Great Adventure	Misok Bedrozian	Episode: "Six Wagons to the Sea"	
1963–1964	Lawbreakers	Himself – Host / Narrator	35 episodes	
1965	Bob Hope Presents the Chrysler Theatre	Nick Karajanian	Episode: "The Loving Cup"	
1968	Sergeant Ryker	Sgt. Paul Ryker	Kraft Suspense Theatre	
1985	The Dirty Dozen: Next Mission	Maj. John Reisman	Television film	

== Stage ==
Year	Title	Role	Venue	Notes	Ref.
1951	Billy Budd	Hallam	Biltmore Theatre, New York	Broadway debut	
1955	The Rainmaker	Noah Curry	La Jolla Playhouse, San Diego		
1956	Bus Stop	Bo Decker	La Jolla Playhouse, San Diego		
