= Season of the Witch =

Season of the Witch may refer to:

== Music ==
- "Season of the Witch" (song), by Donovan, 1966
- "Season of the Witch", a song by Grave Digger from the album Return of the Reaper, 2014
- "Season of the Witch", a song by American hard rock band Zeke
- Seasons of the Witch, a 2003 album by Gotham Road
- Season of the Witch (John 5 album), 2017
- Season of the Witch (Nox Arcana album), 2017

== Films ==
- Season of the Witch (1972 film), a film directed by George A. Romero
- Season of the Witch (2011 film), a supernatural film starring Nicolas Cage
- Halloween III: Season of the Witch, a 1982 horror film

== Books ==
- Season of the Witch, a 1968 science fiction novel by Jean Marie Stine
- The Season of the Witch, a 1971 novel by James Leo Herlihy
- Season of the Witch: Enchantment, Terror, and Deliverance in the City of Love, a 2012 non-fiction book by David Talbot
- Season of the Witch: How the Occult Saved Rock and Roll, a 2014 non-fiction book by Peter Bebergal
- Season of the Witch (The Chilling Adventures of Sabrina, Book 1), a 2019 novel by Sarah Rees Brennan
