= All Fall Down (1962 film) =

1962 film by John Frankenheimer

- Theatrical release poster
- Directed by: John Frankenheimer
- Screenplay by: William Inge
- Based on: All Fall Down; 1960 novel by James Leo Herlihy
- Produced by: John Houseman
- Starring: Eva Marie Saint; Warren Beatty; Karl Malden; Angela Lansbury; Brandon deWilde; Constance Ford; Barbara Baxley; Evans Evans; Madame Spivy; Albert Paulsen
- Cinematography: Lionel Lindon
- Edited by: Fredric Steinkamp
- Music by: Alex North
- Production company: John Houseman Productions
- Distributed by: Metro-Goldwyn-Mayer
- Release date: April 11, 1962
- Running time: 110 minutes
- Country: United States
- Language: English

All Fall Down is a 1962 American drama film, adapted from the novel All Fall Down (1960) by James Leo Herlihy, who later wrote Midnight Cowboy (1965). John Frankenheimer directed and John Houseman produced. The screenplay was adapted by playwright William Inge and the film starred Eva Marie Saint and Warren Beatty. Upon its release, the film was a minor box-office hit. Together with her performance in Frankenheimer's The Manchurian Candidate (1962), Angela Lansbury (who played a destructively manipulative mother with incestuous undertones in both films) won the year's National Board of Review Award for Best Supporting Actress. The film was entered in the 1962 Cannes Film Festival.

== Plot ==
Berry-Berry Willart is a hedonistic drifter in his 20s who has no trouble living off the women of all ages he seduces. When the women become too attached to him, his charm turns sadistic and frequently lands him in jail for battery. Berry-Berry is always on the road far from home, rarely seen by his drunken father Ralph, his mother Annabel, or his sixteen-year-old brother Clinton.

Clinton idolizes Berry-Berry, despite having to bail him out of jail in Florida, and later accompany Ralph to Western Union to wire bail money when Berry-Berry is arrested a second time for beating up a woman. Remarks by Ralph indicate this is not the first time he has wired bail money for Berry-Berry.

Clinton is infatuated with Echo O'Brien, the 31-year-old daughter of a family friend who stays with them when she visits town. Echo has never married, and is getting over the suicide of her troubled long-time boyfriend over a year before. She is friendly toward the much younger Clinton, referring to him affectionately as "my guy".

But when she meets Berry-Berry, there is an instant mutual attraction between them, and they leave a family backyard cookout that evening to be alone together.

Berry-Berry asks Clinton for permission to be with Echo, saying that he wants her and she wants him, but acknowledging that Clinton saw her first. He says he will back off if Clinton does not give the okay. Clinton, knowing he has no real chance with Echo, tells Berry-Berry to treat her nice.

After this, Berry-Berry and Echo are constantly in each other's company.

When they return home after an evening out some time later, Berry-Berry finds out that Echo is pregnant. She tells him that she does not expect anything from him, that she took a gamble that someday he would love her, not that he would marry her, and she lost. As she tells him he is free, he runs out of the house and drives off in the rain, leaving her in tears. Clinton, who makes a habit of eavesdropping, witnesses the whole exchange.

Echo decides she must leave the Willarts' house. She assures Clinton, who is concerned about the rain and the late hour, that she loves driving at night. But the Willarts are awakened later by a call from a state trooper, reporting that Echo had driven off the road and been killed in the ensuing crash.

Ralph tells Annabel and Clinton that Echo was too good a driver for her crash to have been an accident, and that Berry-Berry must have had something to do with it. Clinton throws Berry-Berry's framed portrait to the floor and stomps on it. Annabel pushes him away, picks up the portrait and holds it closely, shrieking that she does not care what Berry-Berry's done, she will love him always.

Clinton sneaks into the shack where Berry-Berry has been living, retrieves the pistol his brother had shown him during a previous visit, and waits behind a curtain for Berry-Berry to return. When he does return, Berry-Berry collapses sobbing onto the bed, having found out about Echo. Clinton puts the pistol back where he found it and leaves, seeing the brother he once wanted to emulate as someone to be pitied.

== Cast ==
Actor	Role
Eva Marie Saint	Echo O'Brien
Warren Beatty	Berry-Berry Willart
Karl Malden	Ralph Willart
Angela Lansbury	Annabel Willart
Brandon deWilde	Clinton Willart
Constance Ford	Mrs. Mandel
Barbara Baxley	School Teacher
Evans Evans	Hedy
Madame Spivy	Bouncer
Albert Paulsen	Capt. Ramirez
Robert Sorrells	Waiter at Sweet Shop

== Production ==
In his memoirs, producer John Houseman notes that All Fall Down was a film he "enjoyed making" and with which he was, "finally, reasonably satisfied." However,

From the start, our most serious problem was young Mr. Beatty. With his angelic arrogance, his determination to emulate Marlon Brando and Jimmy Dean, and his half-baked, overzealous notions of "Method" acting, he succeeded in perplexing and antagonizing not only his fellow actors but our entire crew.

The film was chosen to be the official U.S. entry in the Cannes Film Festival, and its advance reviews were mostly positive. But after MGM's ambitious film of the year, a remake of The Four Horsemen of the Apocalypse, flopped, All Fall Down was rushed to fill the void, "with no publicity or preparation," according to producer Houseman. He contended that his "sophisticated neurotic little film" died "in oversized movie palaces that habitually housed major spectacles and musicals in color." And "most local critics were influenced by the cavernous gloom of empty theaters and sparse and bewildered audiences."

== Reception ==
=== Critical ===
Newsweek put it between "eccentric family" movies like You Can't Take It with You and Long Day's Journey into Night; and historian Arthur Schlesinger Jr., writing in Show magazine, called it "one of the best domestic movies in a decade."

Bosley Crowther of The New York Times panned the film, describing it as "distasteful and full of cheap situations and dialogue". He found the movie's premise—that "everyone in the story is madly in love with a disgusting young man who is virtually a cretin"—fatally flawed.

Pauline Kael gave the film faint praise for being "ambitious" and "elaborately staged", but contrary to reviews of the original novel – which was met upon its release by "widespread critical acclaim" – Kael disliked the story itself. Referring to Clinton, she wrote: "Does anybody really grow up the way this boy grows up? He learns the truth, squares his shoulders, and walks out into the bright sunlight, as Alex North's music rises and swells in victory. How many movies have pulled this damned visual homily on us, this synthetic growing-into-a-man, as if it happened all at once and forever?"

=== Box office ===
According to MGM records, the film recorded a loss of $1,048,000.

== Home media ==
=== Video ===
Warner Home Video released the film on Region 1 DVD as part of its "Archive Collection" on June 22, 2009.

=== Soundtrack ===
Its score had music composed and conducted by Alex North, whose other scores include Spartacus (1960) and Cleopatra (1963).

North's score was released for the first time on CD in April 2003, on the Film Score Monthly (FSM) label in association with Turner Classic Movies Music, as FSM0606, a limited-release of 3,000, along with North's suite for the film The Outrage (1964), directed by Martin Ritt. FSM described North's soundtrack as a "poignant, sweetly jazzy score...full of hushed, haunting textures, with lovely themes drawing the pained connections between the characters, delicately balanced between love and pain".

== See also ==
- List of American films of 1962
- List of drama films
