= Alice Pearce =

American actress (1917–1966)

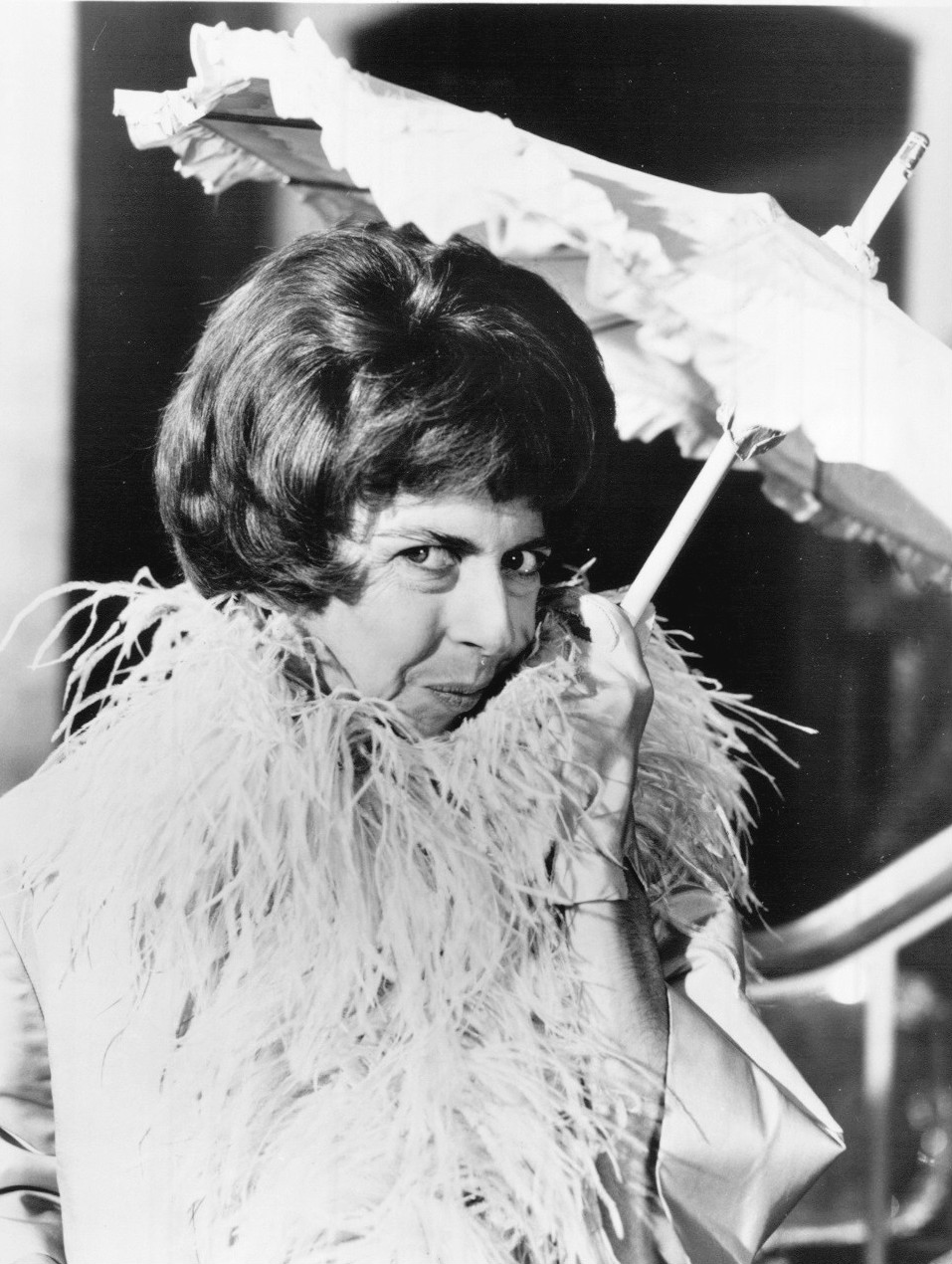
- As Gladys Kravitz in a 1966 publicity still for the Bewitched episode "Samantha, the Dressmaker"
- Born: October 16, 1917; New York City, U.S.
- Died: March 3, 1966 (aged 48); Hollywood, California, U.S.
- Education: Sarah Lawrence College
- Occupation: Actress
- Years active: 1943–1966
- Spouses: John Rox (m. 1948; died 1957) Paul Davis (m. 1964)
- Awards: Primetime Emmy Award for Outstanding Supporting Actress in a Comedy Series

Alice Pearce (October 16, 1917 – March 3, 1966) was an American actress. She was brought to Hollywood by Gene Kelly to reprise her Broadway performance in the film version of On the Town (1949). Pearce played comedic supporting roles in several films before being cast as nosy neighbor Gladys Kravitz in the television sitcom Bewitched in 1964. She won the Primetime Emmy Award for Outstanding Supporting Actress in a Comedy Series posthumously after the second season of the series. She died from ovarian cancer in 1966.

== Early life and career ==
Pearce was born in New York City, the only child of Margaret Clark and Robert E. Pearce. Her father was a foreign banking specialist, and her family moved to Europe when she was 18 months old. They lived in Brussels, Antwerp, Rome, and Paris. At age nine, she fell off a swing after losing her grip and landed on her chin; this incident left her with an underdeveloped chin. She returned to the United States as a teenager and boarded at the Masters School in Dobbs Ferry, New York. She graduated from Sarah Lawrence College in 1940 with a degree in drama.

She began working in nightclubs as a comedienne and was cast in the original Broadway production of On the Town (1944–1946). Gene Kelly was so impressed by her that she became the only cast member to be included in the film version in 1949. Her comedic performance was well received by critics and public alike. She was given her own television variety show, The Alice Pearce Show. More movie roles followed, and she made appearances on Broadway where she met her second husband, director Paul Davis, during a production of Bells Are Ringing.

During the 1953–1954 television season, Pearce was seen regularly on ABC's Jamie, which starred Brandon deWilde. In 1964, Pearce was originally approached to play the part of Grandmama in the ABC television comedy series The Addams Family. She turned down the part, which went to veteran actress Blossom Rock. Later that year, Pearce joined the cast of Bewitched as the nagging and nosy neighbor Gladys Kravitz. Pearce's scenes were almost entirely reactions to the witchcraft she had witnessed at the house across the street. Her hysterical accusations against Samantha, played by Elizabeth Montgomery, and the disbelief of her husband Abner (George Tobias) provided a common thread through many of the series' early episodes. She played the role until her death in 1966 and was replaced by Sandra Gould. Pearce was posthumously awarded an Emmy Award for this role. Her husband accepted the award on her behalf.

== Personal life ==
Pearce was married twice. Her 1948 marriage to composer John Rox lasted until his death in 1957. In September 1964, she married stage manager Paul Davis, with whom she remained until her death. They owned Pesha's Framing Shop, an art gallery and framing store, in West Hollywood. Davis died in February 1984.

== Death ==
Pearce was diagnosed with terminal cancer before Bewitched began. She kept her illness a secret, although her rapid weight loss was quite evident during the second season of the sitcom. She filmed her last episode, "Baby's First Paragraph," on January 21, 1966. Pearce died from ovarian cancer less than two months later on March 3, 1966, at age 48. She was cremated and her ashes were scattered at sea.

== Filmography ==
Year	Title	Role	Notes
1949	On the Town	Lucy Schmeeler	
1949	The Alice Pearce Show	Host	Unknown episodes
1951	Lux Video Theatre	Nina	Season 2 Episode 14: "Dames Are Poison"
1952	The Belle of New York	Elsie Wilkins	
1953	The Motorola Television Hour	Hagga	Season 1 Episode 5: "The Thirteen Clocks"
1953	Broadway Television Theater	Miss Dale Ogden; Lady Emily Lyons	Episode: The Bat by Mary Roberts Rinehart and Avery Hopwood; Episode: The Bishop Misbehaves by Frederick J. Jackson
1953–1954	Jamie	Annie Moakum	6 episodes
1953–1954	Take It from Me	Neighbor	Also known as The Jean Carroll Show
1955	How to Be Very, Very Popular	Miss "Syl" Sylvester	
1955	Alice in Wonderland	Dormouse	TV movie
1956	The Opposite Sex	Olga	
1959	The Real McCoys	Emmy	Season 3 Episode 4: "Work No More, My Lady"
1961	The Twilight Zone	Mrs. Nielsen	Season 2 Episode 20: "Static"
1961	The Ann Sothern Show	Ethel	Season 3 Episode 14: "Operation Pudney"
1961	The Ann Sothern Show	Lahona St. Cyr	Season 3 Episode 25: "The Beginning"
1962	Lad: A Dog	Hilda, the Nurse	
1962	Dennis the Menace	Lucy Tarbell	Season 4 Episode 2: "You Go Your Way"
1962	Dennis the Menace	Lucy Tarbell	Season 4 Episode 12: "Jane Butterfield Says"
1963	My Six Loves	Bus Driver	
1963	Tammy and the Doctor	Millie Baxter, Nurse	
1963	The Thrill of It All	Irving's wife	
1963	The Donna Reed Show	Adele Collins	Season 6 Episode 12: "A Touch of Glamour"
1963	Alfred Hitchcock Presents	Haila French	Season 2 Episode 10: "Good-Bye, George"
1964	Hazel	Miss Elsie	Season 3 Episode 17: "Hot Potato a la Hazel"
1964	Dear Heart	Miss Moore	
1964	The Disorderly Orderly	Mrs. Fuzzibee, Talkative Patient	
1964	Kiss Me, Stupid	Mrs. Mulligan	
1964–1966	Bewitched	Gladys Kravitz	27 episodes
1965	Dear Brigitte	Unemployment Office Clerk	
1965	Bus Riley's Back in Town	Woman Customer / Housewife	
1966	The Glass Bottom Boat	Mabel Fenimore	Alternative title: The Spy in Lace Panties; released posthumously
1967	Vacation Playhouse	Music Teacher	Season 5 Episode 2: "My Boy Googie"; Aired posthumously (final appearance)

== Awards ==
Year	Award	Category	Title of work	Result
1966	Emmy Award	Outstanding Performance by an Actress in a Supporting Role in a Comedy	Bewitched	Won
2003	TV Land Award	Nosiest Neighbor	Bewitched	Won
