= Midnight Cowboy =

1969 film directed by John Schlesinger

- Theatrical release poster
- Directed by: John Schlesinger
- Screenplay by: Waldo Salt
- Based on: Midnight Cowboy (1965 novel) by James Leo Herlihy
- Produced by: Jerome Hellman
- Starring: Dustin Hoffman; Jon Voight; Brenda Vaccaro; John McGiver; Ruth White; Sylvia Miles; Barnard Hughes
- Cinematography: Adam Holender
- Edited by: Hugh A. Robertson
- Music by: John Barry
- Production companies: Jerome Hellman Productions; Mist Entertainment
- Distributed by: United Artists
- Release date: May 25, 1969 (New York)
- Running time: 113 minutes
- Country: United States
- Language: English
- Budget: $3.2 million
- Box office: $44.8 million

Midnight Cowboy is a 1969 American drama film directed by John Schlesinger, adapted by Waldo Salt from the 1965 novel by James Leo Herlihy. The film stars Dustin Hoffman and Jon Voight, with supporting roles played by Sylvia Miles, John McGiver, Brenda Vaccaro, Bob Balaban, Jennifer Salt, and Barnard Hughes. Set in New York City, Midnight Cowboy depicts the unlikely friendship between two lost and lonely hustlers: naïve prostitute Joe Buck (Voight) and ailing con man Rico Rizzo (Hoffman), referred to as "Ratso".

At the 42nd Academy Awards, the film won three awards: Best Picture, Best Director, and Best Adapted Screenplay. Midnight Cowboy is the only X-rated film (equivalent of the current NC-17 rating) to win Best Picture and the only X-rated film ever to win an Academy Award. It placed 36th on the American Film Institute's 1998 list of the 100 greatest American films of all time, and 43rd on its 2007 updated version.

In 1994, Midnight Cowboy was deemed "culturally, historically or aesthetically significant" by the Library of Congress, and selected for preservation in the United States National Film Registry.

== Plot ==
Young Texan Joe Buck quits his dishwashing job, and heads by bus to New York City in cowboy attire to become a male prostitute. Initially unsuccessful, he finally beds a middle-aged woman, Cass, in her Park Avenue apartment. She is insulted when he requests payment, and Joe ultimately gives money to her.

Joe meets Rico "Ratso" Rizzo, an indigent con man with a limp who takes $20 for introducing him to a pimp. After discovering that the alleged pimp is actually an unhinged religious fanatic, Joe flees and unsuccessfully searches for Rico. Joe spends his days wandering the city, listening to his Zenith portable radio and sitting in his hotel room. When his money runs out, management locks Joe out and impounds his belongings.

In an attempt to make money, Joe receives oral sex from a meek young man in a movie theater, but the man has no money. Joe threatens him, but releases him unharmed. The next day, Joe spots Rico at a diner and angrily confronts him. Rico manages to calm Joe and invites him to share his squalid, condemned apartment squat. Joe reluctantly accepts and the two begin a "business relationship" as hustlers. Rico asks Joe to call him "Rico" instead of "Ratso", but Joe does not oblige. Joe fails to find work and the two struggle with severe poverty, stealing food and other necessities. When Rico's persistent cough worsens during the winter without heat in the freezing apartment, Joe is forced to pawn his beloved radio and sell his blood.

In intermittent flashbacks, Joe's grandmother raises him after his mother abandons him. He has a tragic relationship with Annie, his first girlfriend and sexual partner, disclosed through hazy flashbacks in which they are attacked and raped by a cowboy gang. Annie shows signs of mental trauma and is taken into an ambulance.

Rico tells Joe his father was an illiterate Italian immigrant shoeshiner whose job yielded a bad back and lung damage from inhaling shoe polish. Rico learned shoeshining from his father, but considers it degrading and generally refuses to do it. When he breaks into a stand and shines Joe's cowboy boots to attract clients, two police officers arrive and sit with their dirty boots next to Joe's. Rico dreams of escaping to Miami, shown in fantasies in which he and Joe frolic on a beach and are pampered at a resort, including a boy polishing Rico's boots.

Hansel and Gretel, two Warholian filmmakers and performance artists, approach Joe and Rico in a diner, taking Joe's photograph and inviting him to a psychedelic party. (Note: This sequence incorporates actual Warhol superstars Viva, Ultra Violet, International Velvet, Jay Johnson, Jed Johnson, Gerard Malanga, and filmmaker Paul Morrissey.) Joe and Rico attend, but Rico's poor health and hygiene attract unwanted attention. After mistaking a joint for a cigarette and receiving uppers, Joe hallucinates. He leaves with Shirley, a socialite who pays him $20 for spending the night, but Joe cannot perform sexually. They play Scribbage, and the resulting wordplay leads Shirley to suggest that Joe may be gay; suddenly, he is able to perform. The next day, she sets up her female friend as Joe's client, and at last his career appears to be progressing.

When Joe returns to the apartment, Rico is severely feverish. He refuses medical help, and begs Joe to put him on a bus to Florida. Desperate for cash, Joe picks up Towny, an effeminate middle-aged man in an arcade. The two return to Towny's hotel room, where Joe demands money. However, when he refuses to give him more than $10, Joe brutally beats, robs, and apparently smothers him. Joe buys two bus tickets to Florida with the stolen cash. Rico again tells Joe that he wants to be called "Rico", not "Ratso", and Joe finally begins to oblige. During the bus trip, Rico's health worsens, and he suffers from urinary incontinence.

Joe buys new clothing for Rico and himself at a rest stop, discarding his cowboy outfit and boots in the trash. Back on the bus, Joe muses that there must be an easier way to make money than hustling and tells Rico that he will get a regular job in Miami. When he does not respond, Joe realizes that Rico has died. Joe alerts the bus driver, who asks Joe to close Rico's eyelids, saying that they will soon be in Miami. With tears in his eyes, Joe sits with his arm around his dead friend as the bus continues past rows of Floridian palm trees.

== Cast ==
- Dustin Hoffman as "Ratso" or Enrico Salvatore "Rico" Rizzo
- Jon Voight as Joe Buck
- Sylvia Miles as Cass
- John McGiver as Mr. O'Daniel
- Brenda Vaccaro as Shirley
- Barnard Hughes as Towny
- Ruth White as Sally Buck
- Jennifer Salt as Annie
- Gilman Rankin as Woodsy Niles
- Georgann Johnson as Rich Lady
- Anthony Holland as TV Bishop
- Bob Balaban as Young Student
- Viva as Gretel McAlbertson, the Warhol-like The Factory party/happening giver
- Paul Rossilli (a.k.a. Gastone Rossilli) as Hansel McAlbertson, The Factory party/happening filmmaker
- Craig Carrington as Charlie Dealer
- George Eppersen as Ralph
- Paul Benjamin as a bartender
- International Velvet, Ultra Violet, Paul Jabara, Taylor Mead, Cecelia Lipson, and Paul Morrissey as the party guests

== Production ==
The opening scenes were filmed in Big Spring, Texas, in 1968. A roadside billboard, stating, "If you don't have an oil well...get one!", was shown as the New York-bound bus carrying Joe Buck rolled through Texas. Such advertisements, common in the Southwestern United States in the late 1960s and through the 1970s, promoted Eddie Chiles' Western Company of North America.

In the film, Joe stays at the Hotel Claridge, at the southeast corner of Broadway and West 44th Street in Midtown Manhattan. His room overlooked the northern half of Times Square. The building, designed by D. H. Burnham & Company and opened in 1911, was demolished in 1972. A motif featured three times throughout the New York scenes was the sign atop of the facade of the Mutual of New York (MONY) Building at 1740 Broadway. It was extended into the Scribbage scene with Shirley the socialite, when Joe's incorrect spelling of the word "money" matched that of the sign.

Dustin Hoffman, who played a grizzled veteran of New York's streets, is from Los Angeles. Despite his portrayal of Joe Buck, a character hopelessly out of his element in New York, Jon Voight is a native New Yorker, hailing from Yonkers. Voight was paid "scale" (the Screen Actors Guild minimum wage) for his portrayal of Joe Buck, a concession he willingly made to obtain the part. Harrison Ford auditioned for the role of Joe Buck. Michael Sarrazin, who was Schlesinger's first choice, was cast as Joe Buck, only to be let go when Universal, who had him under contract, asked for too much money.

Director John Schlesinger and producer Jerome Hellman had approached Andy Warhol to play the role of an underground filmmaker, but he passed it on to his superstar Viva instead. Her principal scene involved hosting a wild Factory-esque party for which various Warhol superstars were recruited as extras while Warhol lay in the hospital recovering from an assassination attempt. The film set, decorated with original Warhol works rented from the Museum of Modern Art, was filmed at Filmways Studios in East Harlem.

It took several hours to shoot the rape scene, and Jennifer Salt recalls the evening as a traumatic ordeal for her. The wardrobe crew had given Jennifer a nude-colored body suit to wear, but the night was so hot and sticky that she quickly stripped it off. "I felt that the most horrible thing in the world was that people were seeing my bare ass, and that was so humiliating I could not even discuss it. And this kid was just on top of me and all over me and it hurt and no one gave a fuck and it was supposed to look like I was being raped. And I was screaming, screaming, and it was traumatic in some way that couldn't be acknowledged."

On initial review by the Motion Picture Association of America, Midnight Cowboy received an "R" ("Restricted") rating. However, after consulting with a psychologist, executives at United Artists were told to accept an "X" rating, due to the "homosexual frame of reference" and its "possible influence on youngsters". The film was released with an X rating. The MPAA later broadened the requirements for the "R" rating to allow more content, and raised the age restriction from 16 to 17. The film was later rated "R" for a reissue in 1971.

=== "I'm walkin' here!" ===
"I'm walkin' here!"
- The "I'm walkin' here!" scene from the film trailer.
- Character: Rico "Ratso" Rizzo
- Actor: Dustin Hoffman
- First used in: Midnight Cowboy
- Voted #27 in AFI's 100 Movie Quotes poll

One of the most famous lines in Midnight Cowboy is Hoffman's exclamation "I'm walkin' here!" as a taxi cab approaches him and Voight at a traffic intersection. The line reached number 27 on AFI's 100 Years...100 Movie Quotes, but its origin is subject to differing accounts.

Hoffman stated, in an installment of Bravo's Inside the Actors Studio, there were many takes of this scene, with the actors hoping to arrive at the crosswalk and continue their dialogue while walking across the street without interruption. In that take, they were able to cross the road without waiting, but a cab unexpectedly ran the red light and nearly hit them. Hoffman wanted to say, "We're doing a movie here!" and can be heard beginning to say as such in the final film, but he ultimately changed his sentence halfway and stayed in character as he berated the driver with "I'm walkin' here!". As such, the cab driver's angry response is also unscripted.

However, Jerome Hellman disputes the notion that it was an ad-lib on the two-disc DVD set of Midnight Cowboy. The scene, which originally had Ratso pretend to be hit by a taxi to feign an injury, is written into the first draft of the original script.

== Reception ==
Critical response to the film has been largely positive. Vincent Canby's lengthy 1969 review in The New York Times was blunt: "a slick, brutal (but not brutalizing) movie version of ... Herlihy's 1965 novel. It is tough and good in important ways, although its style is oddly romantic and at variance with the laconic material. ... As long as the focus is on this world of cafeterias and abandoned tenements, of desperate conjunctions in movie balconies and doorways, of ketchup and beans and canned heat, Midnight Cowboy is so rough and vivid that it's almost unbearable. ... Midnight Cowboy often seems to be exploiting its material for sensational or comic effect, but it is ultimately a moving experience that captures the quality of a time and a place. It's not a movie for the ages, but, having seen it, you won't ever again feel detached as you walk down West 42nd Street, avoiding the eyes of the drifters, stepping around the little islands of hustlers and closing your nostrils to the smell of rancid griddles."

Gene Siskel of the Chicago Tribune said of the film: "I cannot recall a more marvelous pair of acting performances in any one film." Pauline Kael wrote: "The point of the movie must be to offer us some insight into the two derelicts ... But Schlesinger keeps pounding away at America, determined to expose how horrible the people are ... If he could extend the same sympathy to the other Americans he makes to them, the picture might make better sense ... yet the two actors and the simple Of Mice and Men kind of relationship at the heart of the story save the picture."

In his original 1969 review, Roger Ebert of The Chicago Sun-Times gave the film three stars out of four, praising the "magnificent performances" of Voight and Hoffman and saying the film "should have been about their mutual self-discovery" but was bogged down by clumsy flashbacks and "a string of melodramatic scenes that will not do".

In a 25th-anniversary retrospective in 1994, Owen Gleiberman of Entertainment Weekly wrote: "Midnight Cowboy's peep-show vision of Manhattan lowlife may no longer be shocking, but what is shocking, in 1994, is to see a major studio film linger this lovingly on characters who have nothing to offer the audience but their own lost souls." Ebert also revisited the film for its 25th Anniversary, and largely reiterated his earlier assessment. He said viewers had "done our own editing job on [their memories of the film]. We’ve forgotten the excesses and the detours, and remembered the purity of the central characters and the Voight and Hoffman performances."

As of 2022, Midnight Cowboy holds an 89% approval rating on online review aggregator Rotten Tomatoes, with an average rating of 8.50/10, based on 116 reviews. The website's critical consensus states: "John Schlesinger's gritty, unrelentingly bleak look at the seedy underbelly of urban American life is undeniably disturbing, but Dustin Hoffman and Jon Voight's performances make it difficult to turn away." Metacritic, which uses a weighted average, assigned the film a score of 79 out of 100, based on 16 critics, indicating "generally favorable" reviews.

In 2006, Writers Guild of America West ranked its screenplay 36th in WGA’s list of 101 Greatest Screenplays. The Japanese filmmaker Akira Kurosawa cited this movie as one of his 100 favorite films.

=== Box office ===
The film opened at the Coronet Theatre in New York City, and grossed a house record $61,503 in its first week. In its tenth week of release, the film became number one in the United States, with a weekly gross of $550,237, and was the highest-grossing movie in September 1969. The film earned $11 million in rentals in the United States and Canada in 1969, and added a further $5.3 million the following year when it won the Academy Award for Best Picture. It eventually earned rentals of $20.5 million in the United States and Canada. By 1975, it had earned rentals of over $30 million worldwide.

=== Television premiere ===
More than five years after its theatrical release, Midnight Cowboy premiered on television November 3, 1974. Twenty-five minutes were edited from the film due to censorship regulations and a desire for broader appeal. Although the cuts were approved by director John Schlesinger, critic Kay Gardella of the New York Daily News said the film was "hacked up pretty badly".

=== Accolades ===
Award	Category	Nominee(s)	Result	Ref.
Academy Awards	Best Picture	Jerome Hellman	Won	
Academy Awards	Best Director	John Schlesinger	Won	
Academy Awards	Best Actor	Dustin Hoffman	Nominated	
Academy Awards	Best Actor	Jon Voight	Nominated	
Academy Awards	Best Supporting Actress	Sylvia Miles	Nominated	
Academy Awards	Best Screenplay – Based on Material from Another Medium	Waldo Salt	Won	
Academy Awards	Best Film Editing	Hugh A. Robertson	Nominated	
Berlin International Film Festival	Golden Bear	John Schlesinger	Nominated	
Berlin International Film Festival	OCIC Award	John Schlesinger	Won	
Bodil Awards	Best Non-European Film	John Schlesinger	Won	
British Academy Film Awards	Best Film	John Schlesinger	Won	
British Academy Film Awards	Best Direction	John Schlesinger	Won	
British Academy Film Awards	Best Actor in a Leading Role	Dustin Hoffman	Won	
British Academy Film Awards	Best Screenplay	Waldo Salt	Won	
British Academy Film Awards	Best Editing	Hugh A. Robertson	Won	
British Academy Film Awards	Most Promising Newcomer to Leading Film Roles	Jon Voight	Won	
David di Donatello Awards	Best Foreign Director	John Schlesinger	Won	
David di Donatello Awards	Best Foreign Actor	Dustin Hoffman	Won (Note: Tied with Peter O'Toole for Goodbye, Mr. Chips.)	
Directors Guild of America Awards	Outstanding Directorial Achievement in Motion Pictures	John Schlesinger	Won	
Golden Globe Awards	Best Motion Picture – Drama		Nominated	
Golden Globe Awards	Best Actor in a Motion Picture – Drama	Dustin Hoffman	Nominated	
Golden Globe Awards	Best Actor in a Motion Picture – Drama	Jon Voight	Nominated	
Golden Globe Awards	Best Supporting Actress – Motion Picture	Brenda Vaccaro	Nominated	
Golden Globe Awards	Best Director – Motion Picture	John Schlesinger	Nominated	
Golden Globe Awards	Best Screenplay – Motion Picture	Waldo Salt	Nominated	
Golden Globe Awards	Most Promising Newcomer – Male	Jon Voight	Won	
Grammy Awards	Best Instrumental Theme	John Barry	Won	
Kansas City Film Critics Circle Awards	Best Film		Won	
Kansas City Film Critics Circle Awards	Best Director	John Schlesinger	Won	
Laurel Awards	Top Drama		Won	
Laurel Awards	Top Male Dramatic Performance	Dustin Hoffman	Won	
Laurel Awards	Top Female Supporting Performance	Brenda Vaccaro	Nominated	
Laurel Awards	Top Male New Face	Jon Voight	Won	
Nastro d'Argento	Best Foreign Director	John Schlesinger	Won	
National Board of Review Awards	Top Ten Films		10th Place	
National Film Preservation Board	National Film Registry		Inducted	
National Society of Film Critics Awards	Best Actor	Jon Voight	Won	
New York Film Critics Circle Awards	Best Actor	Dustin Hoffman	Runner-up	
New York Film Critics Circle Awards	Best Actor	Jon Voight	Won	
New York Film Critics Circle Awards	Best Supporting Actor	Dustin Hoffman	Nominated	
Online Film & Television Association Awards	Film Hall of Fame: Productions		Honored	
Turkish Film Critics Association Awards	Best Foreign Film		5th Place	
Writers Guild of America Awards	Best Drama – Adapted from Another Medium	Waldo Salt	Won	

== Soundtrack ==
John Barry composed the score, winning a Grammy Award for Best Instrumental Theme, although he did not receive an on-screen credit. Fred Neil's song, "Everybody's Talkin'", won a Grammy Award for Best Contemporary Vocal Performance, Male for Harry Nilsson. Schlesinger chose the song as its theme, and the song underscores the first act. Other songs considered for the theme included Nilsson's own "I Guess the Lord Must Be in New York City" and Randy Newman's "Cowboy". Bob Dylan wrote "Lay Lady Lay" to serve as the theme song, but did not finish it in time. The movie's main theme, "Midnight Cowboy", features harmonica by Toots Thielemans, but the album version is played by Tommy Reilly. The soundtrack album was released by United Artists Records in 1969.

=== Track listing ===
Side one
No.	Title	Writer(s)	Arranger / Producer	Length
1.	"Everybody's Talkin'" (Nilsson)	Fred Neil	George Tipton (arranger)	2:30
2.	"Joe Buck Rides Again" (instrumental)	John Barry		3:46
3.	"A Famous Myth" (The Groop)	Jeffrey Comanor		3:22
4.	"Fun City" (instrumental)	John Barry		3:52
5.	"He Quit Me" (Leslie Miller)	Warren Zevon	Garry Sherman (arranger)	2:46
6.	"Jungle Gym at the Zoo" (Elephants Memory)	R. Sussmann, Rick Frank Jr., Stan Bronstein	Wes Farrell (producer)	2:15

Side two
No.	Title	Writer(s)	Arranger / Producer	Length
1.	"Midnight Cowboy" (instrumental)	John Barry		2:34
2.	"Old Man Willow" (Elephants Memory)	R. Sussmann, Michal Shapiro, Myron Yules, Stan Bronstein	Wes Farrell (producer)	7:03
3.	"Florida Fantasy" (instrumental)	John Barry		2:08
4.	"Tears and Joys" (The Groop)	Jeffrey Comanor		2:29
5.	"Science Fiction" (instrumental)	John Barry		2:46
6.	"Everybody's Talkin'" (Nilsson; reprise)	Fred Neil	George Tipton (arranger)	1:54

=== Theme song ===
"Midnight Cowboy"

Single by Ferrante & Teicher

from the album Midnight Cowboy
- B-side: "Rock-A-Bye Baby"
- Released: November 1969
- Recorded: 1969
- Genre: Easy listening
- Length: 3:20
- Label: United Artists Records
- Songwriter: John Barry
- Producer: George Butler

Ferrante & Teicher singles chronology
"Andrea" (1969)	"Midnight Cowboy" (1969)	"Lay Lady Lay" (1970)

- John Barry's version, used on the soundtrack, charted at No. 116 in 1969. It also charted at No. 47 in the U.K. in 1980.
- Johnny Mathis' vocal rendition, (the first recording with lyrics by songwriter Jack Gold), reached No. 20 on the U.S. adult contemporary chart in the fall of 1969.
- Ferrante & Teicher's version, the most successful, reached No. 10 on the U.S. Billboard Hot 100, and No. 2 on the easy listening chart. It went to No. 11 in Canada and No. 91 in Australia in 1970.
- Faith No More released a version as the final track on their 1992 album Angel Dust.

=== Charts ===
Chart (1970)	Position
Australia (Kent Music Report)	22

=== Certifications ===
Region	Certification	Certified units/sales
United States (RIAA)	Gold	500,000^{^}
^{^} Shipments figures based on certification alone.

== Legacy ==
The song Crazy Annie from the album Any Way That You Want Me by Evie Sands and co-written by Chip Taylor was inspired by the film.

The Muppet character Rizzo the Rat was named after Ratso Rizzo by creator Steve Whitmire.

The final scene on the bus was parodied in the Seinfeld episode "The Mom & Pop Store". Jon Voight guest stars in the episode as himself.

Australian singer-songwriter Vance Joy references the film in his song Riptide.

The making of the film, as well as the time it was made, is subject of the 2022 documentary feature Desperate Souls, Dark City and the Legend of Midnight Cowboy by Nancy Buirski.

The season two episode of the animated series Futurama entitled "Brannigan, Begin Again" would parody the famous scene where Zapp Brannigan has to live his life as a gigolo, and would even include the film's theme, "Everybody's Talkin'" by Harry Nilsson.

While developing the Marvel Cinematic Universe television series Wonder Man, co-creator Destin Daniel Cretton pitched the series to Marvel Studios as inspired by Midnight Cowboy, specifically in the depiction of an unlikely, budding friendship between struggling actors Simon Williams and Trevor Slattery in the same vein as the dynamic between Joe and Rico.

== See also ==
- List of American films of 1969
- List of Academy Award records
- List of cult films
- List of films featuring hallucinogens
