= All Fall Down (Herlihy novel) =

1960 novel by James Leo Herlihy

- First US edition cover
- Author: James Leo Herlihy
- Language: English
- Publisher: E. P. Dutton (USA) & Faber and Faber (UK)
- Publication date: 1960
- Publication place: United States
- Media type: Print (Hardback & Paperback)
- Pages: 284 pp (hardback edition)

All Fall Down is a 1960 novel by James Leo Herlihy, which was adapted into a 1962 film of the same name directed by John Frankenheimer. It received "widespread critical acclaim".

== Plot introduction ==
The wealthy Williams family is torn apart from within once they invite Echo in.

=== Explanation of the novel's title ===
The novel's title is meant to draw attention to the effect of the self-motivated, destructive passions unleashed within the family home in the course of its story.

== Plot summary ==
When the hedonistic Berry-Berry Williams deserts his pregnant lover, Echo O'Brien, his younger brother Clinton's blind faith in him shows signs of waning, while his parents are disgusted by Berry-Berry's actions.

The book goes back and forth from third person to first person (Clinton's diaries).

== Characters ==
- Berry-Berry Williams – protagonist
- Clinton Williams – younger brother to Berry
- Ralph Williams – father
- Annabel Williams – mother
- Echo O'Brien – family guest who becomes pregnant by Berry

== Film adaptation ==
- The 1962 film, directed by John Frankenheimer, stars Eva Marie Saint as Echo O'Brien, Warren Beatty as Berry-Berry, Karl Malden as Ralph, Brandon deWilde as Clinton and Angela Lansbury as Annabel.

== Release details ==
- 1960, USA, E. P. Dutton, Pub date July 1960, Hardback
- 1961, USA, Pocket Books (Giant Cardinal Edition), Paperback
- 1961, UK, Faber and Faber ISBN 0-571-04094-2, Pub date ? December 1961, Hardback
- 1962, UK, Penguin Books, Paperback
- 1970, UK, Sphere ISBN 0-7221-4510-1, Pub date 16 July 1970, Paperback
- 1990, USA, Donald I Fine ISBN 1-55611-192-4, Pub date ? September 1990, Paperback
