= Jamie (TV series) =

American TV sitcom (1953–1954)

- Screen shot of opening sequence of Jamie
- Starring: Brandon deWilde; Ernest Truex; Polly Rowles; Kathleen Nolan; Alice Pearce; Eva Marie Saint (Pilot)
- Theme music composer: Hugh Martin, Jr. Series; Bernie Green, Pilot
- Opening theme: "Whistle Stop"
- Country of origin: United States
- No. of seasons: 1.2
- No. of episodes: 22, plus Pilot

Production
- Executive producer: David Susskind
- Producers: Julian Claman, Series; Herbert Brodkin, Pilot
- Camera setup: Live; Multi-camera; Kinescope
- Running time: 30 min, approx.
- Production company: Talent Associates

Original release
- Network: ABC-TV
- Release: October 5, 1953 – October 4, 1954

Related
- ABC Album/Plymouth Playhouse (Pilot)

Jamie is a sitcom television series, created by David Susskind's Talent Associates, that was telecast live in the United States of America by ABC-TV from October 5, 1953, until October 4, 1954. It aired live in black-and-white on ABC in the 7:30 to 8 p.m. Eastern Time Monday timeslot.

== History ==
The series was the result of the success of the pilot, the episode "Jamie" of ABC Album/Plymouth Playhouse. It was broadcast on April 26, 1953. The pilot cast would return for the series, except that of Eva Marie Saint who would be replaced by Kathleen Nolan.

The star of the show was 11-year-old Brandon deWilde, whose rising fame had catapulted him to national prominence in a period of three years. Debuting on Broadway in The Member of the Wedding in 1950, he followed with the film version in 1952. He then received a nomination for an Academy Award for Best Supporting Actor for his 1953 portrayal of the young Joey Starrett in George Stevens' film Shane, his most memorable role.

As Jamie was to be aired live, and there was some publicity at the time about the problems of a youngster, however gifted, being so deeply involved in the pressures of a weekly series. deWilde's parents had obtained a contract that allowed him to drop out of the series on short notice if he wanted to, or if his parents felt it was impairing his emotional growth.

After Jamie ran through the 1953–54 season, it began its second season, but after two episodes, it was abruptly cancelled. ABC was having trouble with one of the show's sponsors over what was described as "mundane" business matters, having nothing to do with deWilde's age issue. A revival of the game show The Name's the Same was the replacement for the time slot.

== Synopsis ==
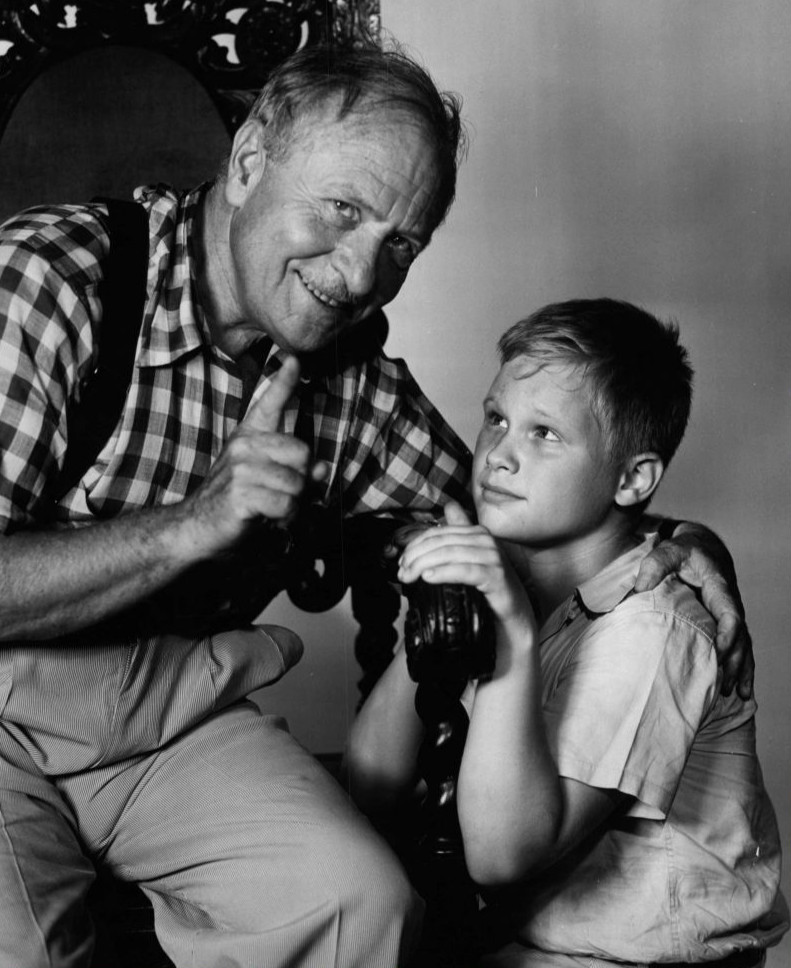
Brandon deWilde as Jamie and Ernest Truex as Grandpa McHummer

Jamie is a 7-year-old boy whose parents had recently died and found himself with no place to unpack his suitcase. Moved from relative to relative, he finally arrives at the home of Aunt Laurie. There he takes on the persona of a modern-day Tom Sawyer. He immediately bonds with Grandpa, another forgotten soul, and they share in a number of "adventures" together.

Episodes of the series contained plot lines ranging from Jamie's disapproval over having to wear spectacles, to running away to the circus, to visiting a rich aunt in Boston, to having his birthday go by forgotten.

Combining both comedy and drama elements, many of the show's plot lines centered on Jamie's and Grandpa's friendship sharing the experiences of growing up and growing old together.

Numerous scenes in the series take place on Aunt Laurie's back porch, where many of the day's problems are discussed and solved.

== Cast ==
- Brandon deWilde portrayed Jamison "Jamie" Francis McHummer, a likeable 7-year-old orphan who had been shunted from one uncaring relative to another, until he landed in Aunt Laurie's household.
- Ernest Truex as Grandpa McHummer, a kindred spirit played by the 63-year-old character actor, who was similarly ignored by his kin.
- Polly Rowles as Aunt Laurie, a widow and matron of the household. There she runs a catering business.
- Kathleen Nolan (as Kathy Nolan) as Liz, Jamie's teenage cousin.
- Alice Pearce as Annie, Aunt Laurie's helper in the catering business. Pearce was later best known as the nosy Gladys Kravitz in Bewitched.

== Theme song ==
The main theme for Jamie was composed by Hugh Martin, Jr. and is titled "Whistle Stop". It is derived from "The Grandma Moses Suite", the score of the 1950 Oscar-nominated documentary film about the celebrated and gifted painter Anna Mary Robertson Moses, better known as Grandma Moses. It is also known as "Movement II" of the Suite. A tune highlighted by flute, oboe and horn, it renders itself to both youth and age. First copyright on April 1, 1952 and renewed on January 4, 1980. "Grandma Moses Suite" has been released on CD by DRG Records.

== Home media ==
Jamie has never been available on home media. Of the pilot and 22 episodes of Jamie broadcast live, at least some are known to have survived on film by the Kinescope process. (Videotape was not introduced until 1956.) The pilot of Jamie and four episodes, including the final, October 4, 1954, airing, are available for viewing at The Paley Center For Media (formerly The Museum of Television and Radio) in New York City and in Beverly Hills, California.
