= The Missouri Traveler =

1958 film

- DVD Cover for The Missouri Traveler
- Directed by: Jerry Hopper
- Written by: John Burress; Norman S. Hall
- Produced by: C. V. Whitney; Patrick Ford
- Starring: Brandon deWilde; Lee Marvin; Gary Merrill; Paul Ford
- Cinematography: Winton C. Hoch
- Edited by: Tom McAdoo
- Music by: Jack Marshall
- Production company: C. V. Whitney Pictures
- Distributed by: Buena Vista Film Distribution Co., Inc.
- Release date: January 21, 1958
- Running time: 103 minutes
- Country: United States
- Language: English

The Missouri Traveler is a 1958 American coming-of-age period piece drama film directed by Jerry Hopper starring Brandon deWilde and Lee Marvin. It is based on the novel of the same name by John Burress. The cinematography was by Technicolor developer Winton C. Hoch with harmonica and banjo score by Jack Marshall of The Munsters fame. The feature was distributed by the Buena Vista Corporation subsidiary of Walt Disney Productions, but the film did not carry the "Disney" trademark.

It is the second of only 3 films produced by Cornelius Vanderbilt Whitney's C. V. Whitney Pictures; the first being The Searchers in 1956 with John Wayne and directed by John Ford, the last being The Young Land in 1959 with Patrick Wayne and Dennis Hopper.

Whitney married Mary Hosford (best-known later as socialite heiress Marylou Whitney), whom he gave a prominent part in this film, the same year it was released. The following year, in 1959, deWilde's career would graduate to more adult themes in Blue Denim.

== Plot ==
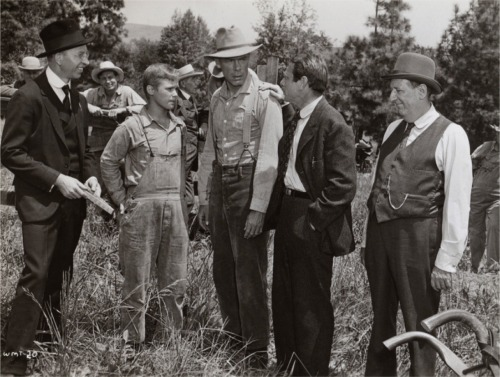
Cast of The Missouri Traveler includes (l to r) Frank Cady, Brandon deWilde, Lee Marvin, Gary Merrill and Paul Ford.

Biarn Turner, a 15-year-old runaway from the Eatondale Orphan Asylum, is bound for Florida in the post-World War I time period of 1926. He receives a ride into the rural Missouri town of Delphi with rich land-owner Tobias Brown (Lee Marvin). There, after an episode in the town square involving most of the populace, he meets crusty newspaper man Doyle Magee (Gary Merrill).

Both of these men share an interest in the polite and mature youth; one showing kindness, the other almost outright cruelty. Eventually, both of their reasonings become clear to the lad. At the same time, the whole town of Delphi comes to not only accept Biarn, but to embrace him as one of the town's own and his dream of becoming a farmer. Highlights include a small-town 4th of July parade and celebration with a horse-trotting race and a head-to-head between Magee and Brown.

== Cast ==
- Brandon deWilde as Biarn Turner
- Lee Marvin as Tobias Brown
- Gary Merrill as Doyle Magee
- Paul Ford as Finas Daugherty
- Mary Hosford as Anna Love Price
- Ken Curtis as Fred Mueller
- Cal Tinney as Clyde Hamilton Baker
- Frank Cady as Willie Poole
- Mary Field as Nelda Hamilton
- Kathleen Freeman as Serena Poole
- Will Wright as Sheriff Peavy
- Tom Tiner as Reverend Thomdyke
- Bill Bryant as Henry Craig
- Barry Curtis as Jimmy Price
- Eddie Little as "Red" Poole
- Roy Jenson as Simpson

== Production ==
The book version of this story, upon which the film was based, has a more complex story line than was able to be incorporated into the film version. In the book, Biarn has a significant impact on the lives of several of the townspeople without his consciously trying to affect them. This is missing from the film version, which comes across more like a family Disney type film. Unfortunately, while it is a better version of the story, the book "The Missouri Traveler" is very difficult to find.

== Home media ==
No less than six different releases of The Missouri Traveler were produced on VHS. Similarly, multiple DVD versions were released over the years, mainly as an inclusion in a multiple film "family pack". Presently, The Missouri Traveler is available in Region 0 DVD through Reel Enterprises and video on demand in standard pan and scan VHS conversion format. A new DVD of the film was released on April 14, 2015, from VCI Entertainment (VCIV8793DVD).

== See also ==
- List of American films of 1958
