= The Sorcerer's Apprentice (Alfred Hitchcock Presents) =

- Alfred Hitchcock Presents episode
- Episode no.: Season 7 Episode 39
- Directed by: Joseph Lejtes
- Written by: Robert Bloch
- Cinematography by: John L. Russell
- Editing by: Edward W. Williams
- Original air date: Unaired

Guest appearances
- Diana Dors: Irene; Brandon deWilde: Hugo; David J. Stewart: Sadini; Larry Kert: George; Alfred Hitchcock (host)

Episode chronology
← Previous "Where Beauty Lies"	Next → "A Piece of the Action"

"The Sorcerer's Apprentice" is a seventh-season episode of Alfred Hitchcock Presents made in the summer of 1961 that has never been broadcast on network television. The episode was scheduled to be episode 39 of the season. The story and teleplay were written by Robert Bloch, the author of Psycho, and the episode was directed by Joseph Lejtes.

The four main characters are played by Diana Dors (Irene Sadini), Brandon deWilde (Hugo), David J. Stewart (Vincent Sadini), and Larry Kert (George Morris).

Although formerly considered a lost episode, "The Sorcerer's Apprentice" has since been widely distributed in syndication and – due to its status in the public domain – in numerous Hitchcock home media releases and video on demand.

== Plot ==
Exiting his trailer on a cold windy night in Toledo for a smoke, carnival magician Sadini the Great spots an unconscious youth on the ground. Sadini and food vendor Milt carry the boy into Sadini's trailer. A short time later, Sadini's wife Irene enters. Displeased by the youth's presence, Irene finally accedes to Sadini's request to get food for the lad after the boy describes her as an angel. The boy also compares Sadini's appearance to that of the devil.

Alfred Hitchcock Presents features Brandon deWilde as the mentally troubled Hugo in "The Sorcerer's Apprentice" episode.

The boy, Hugo, regains his strength and becomes infatuated with Irene. He follows her around the carnival, inadvertently discovering that she is cheating on Sadini with George Morris, the high-wire artist. Hugo and George watch Sadini's magic act together. Hugo becomes fascinated, especially when Sadini saws Irene in half and then "restores" her. Sadini offers Hugo a job with the Keeley's Carnival assisting with his props.

Irene plans to murder her husband and frame Hugo for the crime. Irene uses Hugo's inability to distinguish fantasy from reality to convince the boy that by killing Sadini, he will inherit Sadini's magic wand and gain its powers.

Late at night while Irene is with George, Hugo waits in Sadini's trailer. When Sadini arrives, Hugo stabs him to death and hides the body in a trunk. George arrives in a drunken state to warn Hugo of Irene's intentions, but he passes out. Hugo leaves him in the trailer with the body, and goes to George's trailer in Sadini's cape, wand in hand. He tries to convince Irene to run away with him.

Startled by Hugo's demeanor, Irene tries to escape but she slips and falls, hitting her head and falling unconscious. Hugo scoops up Irene and carries her off to the performance tent. There, as a demonstration of his newly acquired magical powers, he attempts to perform Sadini's "sawing a woman in half" trick on Irene, to her horror as she awakens screaming. Hugo shouts, "Smile, Irene! Smile! Smile!," as the picture fades to black.

In his closing monologue, Hitchcock explains, "I don't quite know how to put this. However, I must tell you the truth. The saw worked excellently, but the wand didn't. Hugo was terribly upset, and Irene was beside herself. As for the police, they misunderstood the whole thing and arrested Hugo for murder."

== Background ==
The script was based on a short story by Robert Bloch which had appeared in the January 1949 edition of Weird Tales.

It was the only half hour episode of Presents to be refused to be broadcast. Bloch said "When the network censors viewed the teleplay there was thunder from on high. This show was simply ‘too gruesome’ to be aired. Nobody called me on the carpet because of this capricious decision - as a matter of fact, when the series went into syndication, my show was duly televised without a word from the powers that be.”

== Lost episode and public domain ==
"The Sorcerer's Apprentice" episode of Alfred Hitchcock Presents never aired on the NBC Television network because the finale, by 1960s standards, was deemed "too gruesome" by sponsor Revlon. The following season, Alfred Hitchcock Presents switched to a 1-hour format and a new name (The Alfred Hitchcock Hour), thus rendering the half-hour episode unusable. The episode eventually was released in the program's syndication package to affiliate stations without a word of complaint from anyone.

"The Sorcerer's Apprentice", once denied network broadcast, is now the most widely distributed Alfred Hitchcock Presents episode of all those produced. Because of the public domain status of this episode, it thrives in numerous VHS and DVD releases attached to the Hitchcock name, usually as an addition to a Hitchcock set, often with his silent era pieces that also have lapsed copyrights. "The Sorcerer's Apprentice" can be viewed free on the Internet Archive.

== See also ==
- Alfred Hitchcock
- Alfred Hitchcock Presents
- List of Alfred Hitchcock Presents episodes
