= Kick the Can =

- The Twilight Zone episode
- Episode no.: Season 3 Episode 21
- Directed by: Lamont Johnson
- Written by: George Clayton Johnson
- Production code: 4821
- Original air date: February 9, 1962

Guest appearances
- Ernest Truex: Charles Whitley; Barry Truex: Charles' son; Russell Collins: Ben Conroy; John Marley: Mr. Cox; Burt Mustin: Carlson; Earle Hodgins: Agee; Hank Patterson: Freitag; Marjorie Bennett: Mrs. Summers; Lenore Shanewise: Mrs. Densley; Eve McVeagh: Night nurse; Anne O'Neal as Mrs. Wister

Episode chronology
← Previous "Showdown with Rance McGrew"	Next → "A Piano in the House"
- The Twilight Zone (1959 TV series) (season 3)

"Kick the Can" is episode 86 of the American television anthology series The Twilight Zone. It originally aired on February 9, 1962, on CBS.

== Opening narration ==
Sunnyvale Rest, a home for the aged – a dying place, and a common children's game called kick-the-can, that will shortly become a refuge for a man who knows he will die in this world, if he doesn't escape - into The Twilight Zone.

== Plot ==
Charles Whitley, a retiree at Sunnyvale Rest Home, thinks he has discovered the secret of youth. He is convinced that if he acts young, he will become young. His oldest and best friend Ben Conroy, whom he has known since childhood, thinks he is going crazy. Conroy persuades the home's superintendent, Mr. Cox, that this is the case. Mr. Cox decides to put Charles in isolation and under observation. Ben tries to convince Charles to act as sedate as the other residents in order to avoid this fate, to no avail. While Ben sees aging as an inescapable fact of life, Charles is convinced that Ben's thinking of himself as old is what made him old.

That night, Charles convinces a number of residents to play a game of kick the can with him. He tries to talk Ben into joining them, but Ben refuses. The residents light a firecracker and throw it out a window, the noise drawing the nurse's attention so they can sneak out the door. Meanwhile, Ben alerts Mr. Cox to what the other residents are planning. They run outside to find a group of children playing kick the can instead. Ben recognizes one of the children as Charles, who has become young again. He begs young Charley for a chance to go with him, but the boy seems not to know him, and dashes away into the darkness. Mr. Cox searches elsewhere for the elderly residents, while Ben walks slowly to the front steps of Sunnyvale and sits there with the can, alone, knowing that Mr. Cox can look all he wants for the residents, but he will never find them.

== Closing narration ==
Sunnyvale Rest, a dying place for ancient people, who have forgotten the fragile magic of youth. A dying place for those who have forgotten that childhood, maturity, and old age are curiously intertwined and not separate. A dying place for those who have grown too stiff in their thinking – to visit – The Twilight Zone.

== Cast ==
- Ernest Truex as Charles Whitley
- Barry Truex as Charles' son
- Russell Collins as Ben Conroy
- John Marley as Mr. Cox
- Burt Mustin as Carlson
- Earle Hodgins as Agee
- Hank Patterson as Freitag
- Marjorie Bennett as Mrs. Summers
- Lenore Shanewise as Mrs. Densley
- Eve McVeagh as Night nurse
- Anne O'Neal as Mrs. Wister

== Remake ==
"Kick the Can" was remade into a segment in Twilight Zone: The Movie, directed by Steven Spielberg and starring Scatman Crothers as Mr. Bloom.

In this version, an old man named Mr. Bloom has just moved into Sunnyvale Retirement Home. He listens to the other elders reminisce about the joys they experienced in their youth. Mr. Bloom says just because they are old does not mean they cannot enjoy life anymore. He tells them that later that night, he will wake them and that they can join him in a game of kick the can. Leo Conroy objects, saying that now that they are all old they cannot engage in physical activity.

While Mr. Conroy sleeps, Mr. Bloom gathers the rest of the residents outside and plays the game, during which they are transformed into childhood versions of themselves. They are ecstatic to be young again and engage in activities they enjoyed long ago, but their thoughts soon turn to practical matters such as where they will spend the night, since they will no longer be welcomed in the retirement home and their families won't recognize them. They ask to be old again. Mr. Bloom grants their wish. Leo Conroy wakes up and witnesses one resident, Mr. Agee, who still remains young, and asks for Agee to take him along. Agee tells Conroy that he cannot go with him.

The segment ends with Conroy kicking a can around the yard, hoping to recreate the spell that made Agee young again, while Mr. Bloom leaves Sunnyvale and moves into another retirement home, to spread his good-natured magical skills to other senior citizens.
