= Plymouth Playhouse =

American TV anthology series (1953)

Plymouth Playhouse, also known as ABC Album, is a half-hour American television anthology series that aired in 1953 to present "pilot program concepts."

== History ==
The program was initially called ABC Album but it became known as Plymouth Playhouse when Plymouth became a sponsor beginning with the April 26, 1953, broadcast. ABC described the sponsorship (estimated at $250,000) as "one of the largest television sales since the merger of ABC with United Paramount Theaters". Episodes aired on the American Broadcasting Company (ABC) from April 12, 1953, to June 21, 1953. Some of the productions were live while others were filmed. It was hosted by David Cook. ABC used the program to audition possible series in the hopes of gaining sponsorship for the fall 1953 TV season.

=== Spin-off programs ===
Three of the episodes went on to become series of their own:
Colonel Humphrey Flack (1953–54), starring Alan Mowbray on DuMont Television
Jamie (1953–54), starring Brandon deWilde on ABC
Justice (1954–55), starring Paul Douglas and Lee Grant on NBC

== Guest stars ==
Other guest stars included Eva Marie Saint, Robert Preston (actor), Boris Karloff, Vincent Price, Eddie Albert, Lee Marvin, Jane Wyatt, Gary Merrill, and Wendell Corey.

== Episodes ==
Partial list of episodes of Plymouth Playhouse
Date	Title	Actor(s)
April 12, 1953	"Justice"	Douglas, Grant
April 26, 1953	"Jamie"	deWilde, Ernest Truex
May 3, 1953	"A Tale of Two Cities" (part 1)	Corey, Wanda Hendrix, Judith Evelyn
May 10, 1953	"A Tale of Two Cities" (part 2)	Corey, Hendrix, Evelyn
May 17, 1953	"Hogan's Daughter"	Sheila Bond, Joshua Shelley, Pat Harrington
May 24, 1953	"Four Stories"	Karloff
June 7, 1953	"The Split Second"	Geraldine Fitzgerald

== Production ==
Directors included Dick Darley and two later Academy Award-nominated feature directors, Martin Ritt, and Ralph Nelson. Herbert Brodkin was the producer. Writers included John Whedon and Halstead Welles was the writer.

=== "A Tale of Two Cities" ===
ABC said that the two-part production of "A Tale of Two Cities" on Plymouth Playhouse used "perhaps the most extensive exterior settings ever used in a live dramatic television show." Much of the network's 23-acre Television Center facility was used for outdoor scenes that included a cobblestone street in France, the Old Bailey in London, and a scaffold with a guillotine.

Interior scenes were shot on 14 sets that were specially designed on two sound stages. Producers gained 3,000 square feet of interior space by having seats for the audience removed from the studio.

== Critical response ==
A review in the trade publication Billboard said that the premiere episode indicated that the series might be "one of the hottest TV properties to unveil in a long time." Bob Francis wrote that the episode "Justice" was "exceedingly well-written" and that all aspects of the show "smacked of top-drawer projection." He called the acting of Douglas and Grant "superb" and said that Nelson's directing was "sensitively imaginative".

The trade publication Variety said that the "Hogan's Daughter" episode fell short of the program's usual high quality. A review complimented the work of the actors but said that their efforts could not overcome a flawed story. Nelson's directing received compliments, but the review concluded, "John Whedon's script had the premise of an idea, but its lack of development stymied proceedings from the start."
