= The Member of the Wedding (film) =

1952 film

- Directed by: Fred Zinnemann
- Screenplay by: Edna Anhalt; Edward Anhalt
- Based on: The Member of the Wedding by Carson McCullers
- Produced by: Stanley Kramer
- Starring: Ethel Waters; Julie Harris; Brandon deWilde
- Cinematography: Hal Mohr
- Edited by: William A. Lyon
- Music by: Alex North
- Production company: Stanley Kramer Productions
- Distributed by: Columbia Pictures
- Release date: December 25, 1952
- Running time: 90 minutes (TCM print)
- Country: United States
- Language: English

The Member of the Wedding is a 1952 American drama film directed by Fred Zinnemann and starring Ethel Waters, Julie Harris and Brandon de Wilde. The story, based on Carson McCullers' 1946 novel of the same name, is set in a small town in the Southern United States.

== Plot ==
Feeling rejected when her older brother takes his honeymoon without inviting her, Frankie runs away from her middle-class Southern home. She endures several other adolescent traumas, such as the sudden death of her young cousin John Henry. With the help of warm-hearted housekeeper Berenice Sadie Brown, Frankie makes an awkward transition to young womanhood.

== Cast ==
- Ethel Waters as Berenice Sadie Brown
- Julie Harris as Frankie Addams
- Brandon deWilde as John Henry
- Arthur Franz as Jarvis Addams
- Nancy Gates as Janice
- William Hansen as Mr. Addams
- James Edwards as Honey Camden Brown
- Harry Bolden as T. T. Williams
- Dickie Moore as Soldier
- Hugh Beaumont as Minister (uncredited)

== Soundtrack ==
The soundtrack was composed by Alex North and performed by Morris Stoloff and his orchestra. Ethel Waters is also credited in the score, singing the hymn "His Eye Is on the Sparrow". The song that plays in the opening credits is titled "Magnolia".

== Awards ==
Julie Harris was nominated for an Academy Award for her performance.

== Adaptations ==
Carson McCullers' novel was later adapted for television several times. The character of Berenice was played by Claudia McNeil in 1958, by Pearl Bailey in 1982 and by Alfre Woodard in 1996. Anna Paquin was cast as Frankie in the 1996 production.
