= Scribbage =

Dice word game

Scribbage (also marketed as Ad-Lib Crossword Clues) is a classic dice word game published in 1959 by the E.S. Lowe Company. Thirteen dice are rolled which have various letters on each side. Each letter is given a point value depending on its frequency in the English language. A timer is flipped and the player has to put the dice into words either left-to-right or up-and-down. The words must connect with each other as in crossword puzzles or Scrabble. The player must stop at the end of the time and points are counted. The player adds up the points of the letters used and subtracts the amount from the unused letters. Scribbage can be played with two or more players.

A nearly identical game called Crossword Cubes from game maker Selchow and Righter (makers of Scrabble) uses 14 cubes instead of 13. Despite its name, Scribbage has nothing in common with the card game cribbage.

== Gameplay ==
Scribbage is a spelling game similar to Scrabble. The parts are a set of 13 letter dice and a timer. Each face of the dice is stamped with a letter and a number with the exception of two which show Jokers. The number represents the letter's frequency in English.

Each player in turn throws the letter dice and turns over the timer. The player must make as many words as possible before the timer runs out. All words must be connected in a crossword style. The two Jokers can be used as any letter.

The play is scored by adding the points in all words formed. Any letters used in two words are counted in each word. The player reduces this score by the total of the numbers on any unused letters. It is possible, if unusual, to end the game with a negative score.

The game can either be played for a set number of rounds or until a certain score is reached.

Scribbage is also available in modern-day on the internet through an app on Google Play, the Apple App Store and through Facebook.

The letter distribution for each die is:

ABESXY

ACEFIZ

ADEJNR

ADETVW

AEHLST

AFGILQ

BMNOSU

CKNOUV

DEIRS◇

EGIMP◇

EHNORT

EILORT

MOPUWY

The point values are:

A-1

B-4

C-4

D-3

E-1

F-4

G-4

H-3

I-2

J-6

K-5

L-2

M-3

N-2

O-1

P-4

Q-8

R-2

S-2

T-2

U-3

V-4

W-4

X-8

Y-4

Z-10

◇(wild)-0

== In popular culture ==
A game of Scribbage is played in the film Midnight Cowboy between Joe Buck (Jon Voight) and his client Shirley (Brenda Vaccaro) in which Joe tries playing MONY which he remembers seeing on a billboard and believes to be how "money" is spelled.

A Scribbage box can be seen in the season 3 finale of Stranger Things.

== Reviews ==
- Games & Puzzles
- Games & Puzzles #31
