= Ernest Truex =

American actor (1889–1973)

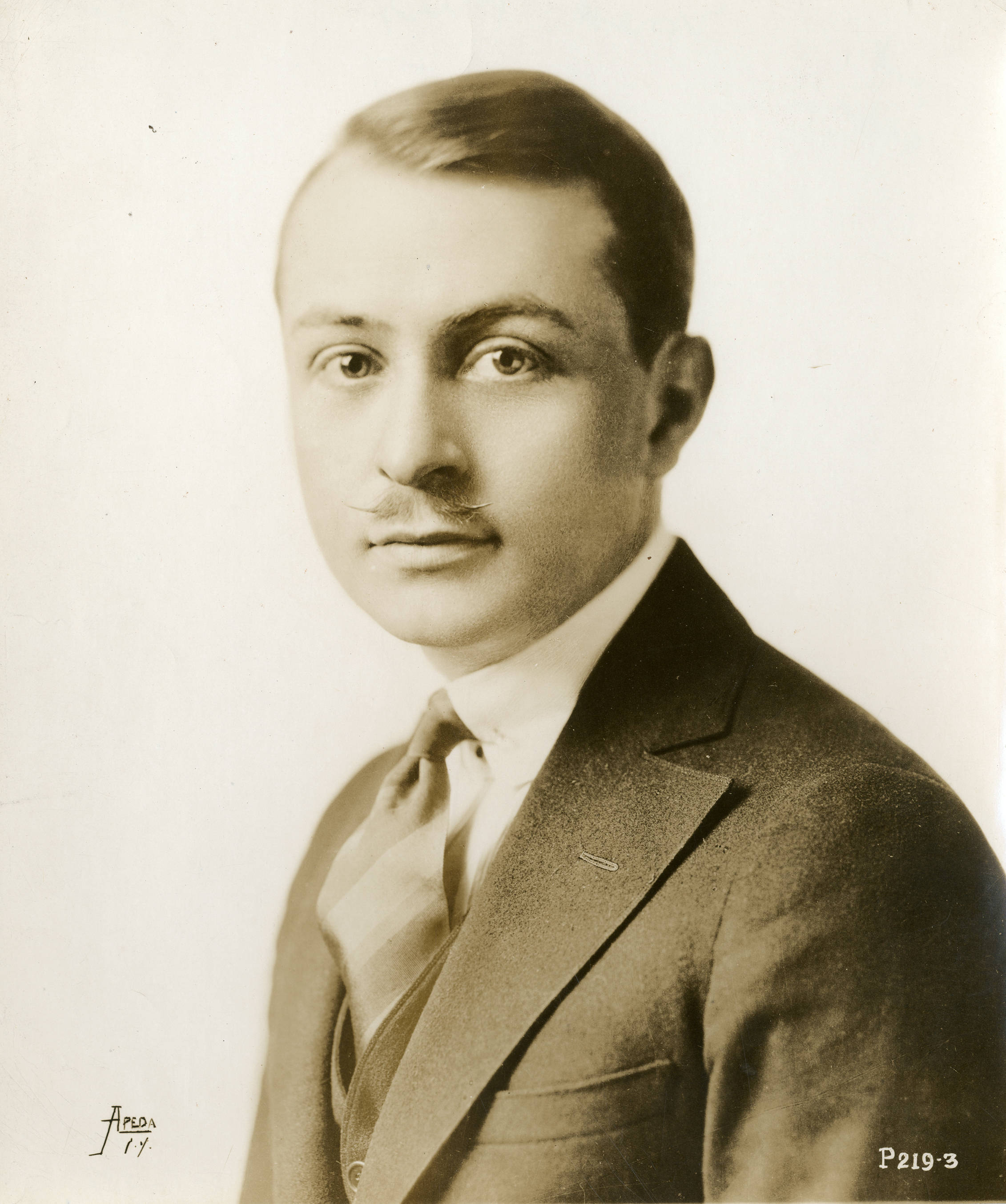
- Truex in 1922
- Born: September 19, 1889; Kansas City, Missouri, U.S.
- Died: June 26, 1973 (aged 83); Fallbrook, California, U.S.
- Occupation: Actor
- Years active: 1895–1966
- Spouses: Julia Mills (died); Mary Jane Barrett (divorced); Sylvia Field (m. 1941–1973)
- Children: 3

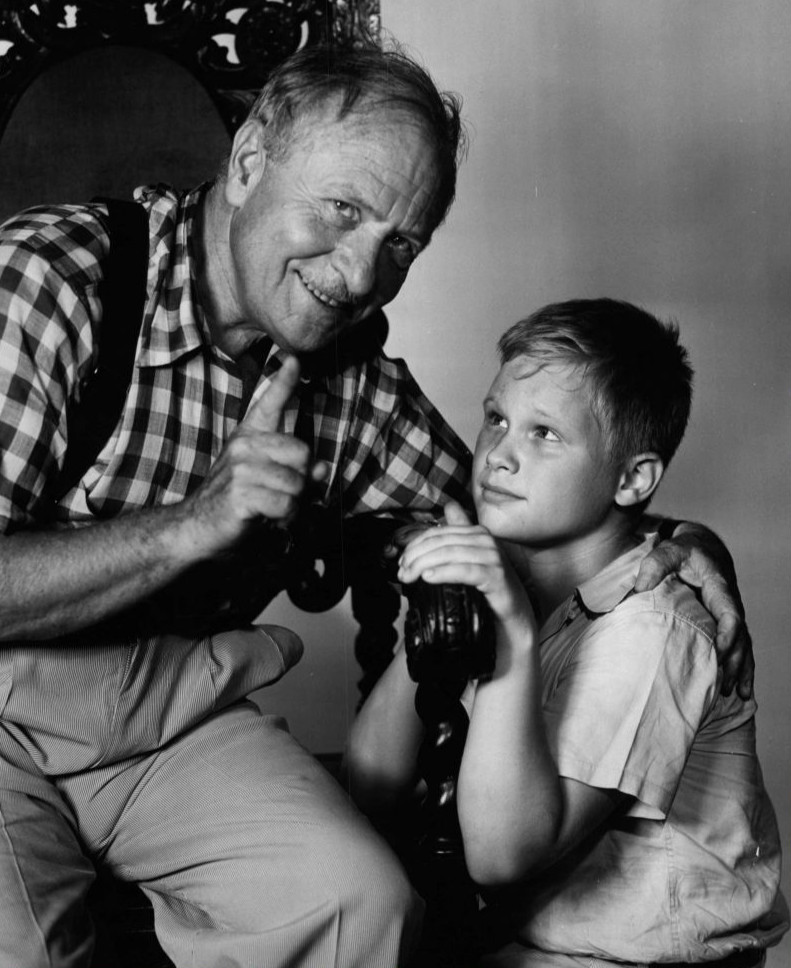
Ernest Truex and Brandon deWilde in the TV series Jamie (1953)

Ernest Truex (September 19, 1889 – June 26, 1973) was an American actor of stage, film, and television.

== Career ==
Truex was born in Kansas City, Missouri. He learned acting at an early age after his father, a doctor, treated actor Edwin Melvin, who paid his bill by giving the son elocution lessons. He started acting at age five and toured through Missouri at age nine as "The Child Wonder in Scenes from Shakespeare".

As a young man, he lived in Denver and was among the supporting actors at the Elitch Theatre, appearing during the 1903, 1904, 1905, 1906 and 1907 seasons. Truex began his career of "walk-ons" at Elitch while he was still a student at East High School (where his classmates included Douglas Fairbanks and Harold Lloyd.) Among his performances at the theatre were the play of When Knighthood Was in Flower with Maude Fealy. and Tess of the d'Urbervilles, which featured Tyrone Power Sr. and a young Cecil B. DeMille in the supporting cast. In 1906, he appeared in several shows with young Colorado natives, Douglas Fairbanks and Spring Byington.

His Broadway debut came in Wildfire (1908), and he performed in several David Belasco plays and portrayed the title role in the 1915 musical Very Good Eddie. Truex played the lead role in the disastrous 1923 premiere of F. Scott Fitzgerald's The Vegetable. In 1927, he created the role of Bill Paradene in Good Morning, Bill, which was based on an original play by Ladislas Fodor and adapted by P.G. Wodehouse.

In 1926, he performed for the first time in London's West End. He played a leading role in The Fall Guy at the Apollo Theatre. He continued to perform in plays in London for the next three years while his two sons attended Leighton Park School in Reading. In 1927, he acted in Good Morning, Bill at the Duke of York's Theatre and in 1928 he performed in Sexes and Sevens at the Globe Theatre. In 1930, he appeared on Broadway in Ritzy.

He made his film debut in 1913, but did not work in film full-time for another 20 years. He tended to play "milquetoast" characters and in The Warrior's Husband he played a "nance". In the 1938 The Adventures of Marco Polo, he played Marco Polo's comical assistant, opposite Gary Cooper.

Early in television, Truex guest starred on Faye Emerson's Wonderful Town. In 1949, he starred in The Truex Family on WPIX in New York City. Also in that year, he played Caspar Milquetoast on the DuMont Television Network's Program Playhouse Series. From 1953 to 1954, he co-starred with Brandon deWilde in Jamie. He played aging Grandpa McHummer striking a bond with young Jamie, his recently orphaned grandson. In the early 1960s, he played Gladys' father on Pete and Gladys.

In later life, he became known for playing elderly men on television in works such as Justice, Mister Peepers, Hazel, and Father Knows Best. He had the main role in the "Kick the Can" episode of Rod Serling's original The Twilight Zone (with his son Barry). In another Twilight Zone episode, "What You Need" (airing on December 25, 1959), he played a traveling peddler who just happened to have exactly what people needed just before they knew they needed it.

He starred in the first season (1958-1959) of The Ann Sothern Show as Jason Macauley, the manager of the swank Bartley House hotel in New York City. Reta Shaw played his domineering wife Flora. In 1960, Truex appeared with Harpo Marx in the episode "Silent Panic" of the anthology series The DuPont Show with June Allyson. He guest starred on the sitcom Dennis the Menace, with Jay North as the series lead.

== Personal life ==
Truex’s first wife was Julia Mills, with whom he had two sons, Philip in 1911 and James in 1912. Philip had an acting career until the early 1950s. Philip Truex's greatest success in the theatre was when he landed the starring role of Og in the Broadway musical Finian's Rainbow in 1947. His most famous film performance is the title role in Alfred Hitchcock's The Trouble with Harry (1955) as Harry, the corpse dragged all over the countryside by several other characters in this film. Philip had expected to have substantial lines to speak in the role but Hitchcock decided to kill off the character of Harry before he could utter one word. After this disappointment Philip decided to give up acting completely and turned his hand to landscape gardening.

A widower, Ernest Truex married stage actress Mary Jane Barrett, appearing with her in New York in such plays as The Third Little Show, (1931), The Hook-Up (1935), and Fredericka (1937). They had one child, Barry Truex, who had an acting career of his own from 1949 to the early 1960s. His career began in 1949 when he played the role of Ernest's youngest son in the TV situation comedy The Truex Family, broadcast on WPIX New York. All of Ernest Truex's immediate family had acting parts in this show, which was co-written by his second son James Truex. In 1962, Barry again played opposite his father in the episode "Kick the Can" of the TV series The Twilight Zone. Barry's more memorable film roles were in The Benny Goodman Story playing the young Benny Goodman (1956), Rockabilly Baby (1957), and Dragstrip Riot (1958). He also acted in numerous TV productions.

In 1934, Ernest Truex directed, co-produced, and starred in the play Sing and Whistle, which co-starred actress Sylvia Field. She later became his third wife, upon his divorce from Barrett.

== Death ==
On June 26, 1973, Truex died of a heart attack at the age of 83.

== Partial filmography ==
- Caprice (1913) - Wally Henderson
- An American Citizen (1914) - Mercury
- A Good Little Devil (1914) - Charles MacLance, a Good Little Devil
- Dope (1914) - Jimmy Binkley
- Artie, the Millionaire Kid (1916) - Artie Hamilton
- Come on In (1918) - Ernest Short
- Good-Bye, Bill (1918) - Teddy Swift
- Oh, You Women! (1919) - Abraham Lincoln Jones
- The Night of the Dub (1919, Short)
- Six Cylinder Love (1923) - Gilbert Sterling
- Whistling in the Dark (1933) - Wallace Porter
- The Warrior's Husband (1933) - Sapiens
- Get That Venus (1933) - Tom Wilson
- Everybody Dance (1936) - Wilbur Spurgeon
- Mama Runs Wild (1937) - Ernest Summers
- Start Cheering (1938) - Blodgett
- The Adventures of Marco Polo (1938) - Binguccio
- Freshman Year (1938) - Professor Lucius Peabody
- Swing That Cheer (1938) - Professor Peabody
- Swing, Sister, Swing (1938) - Professor L. Orlando Beebee
- Ambush (1939) - Mr. Gibbs
- It's a Wonderful World (1939) - Willie Heyward
- Bachelor Mother (1939) - Orphanage Investigator
- Island of Lost Men (1939) - Frobenius
- These Glamour Girls (1939) - Alumnus
- The Under-Pup (1939) - Mr. Binns
- Little Accident (1939) - Tabby Morgan
- Slightly Honorable (1939) - P. Hemingway Collins
- His Girl Friday (1940) - Bensinger
- Adventure in Diamonds (1940) - Toutasche
- Little Orvie (1940) - Frank Stone
- Lillian Russell (1940) - Charles K. Leonard
- Dance, Girl, Dance (1940) - Bailey #1
- Calling All Husbands (1940) - Homer Trippe
- Christmas in July (1940) - Mr. Baxter
- The Gay Vagabond (1941) - A.J. Wilber
- Tillie the Toiler (1941) - George Winkler
- We Go Fast (1941) - Harold Bruggins
- Unexpected Uncle (1941) - Wilkins
- Don't Get Personal (1942) - Jules Kinsey
- Twin Beds (1942) - Larky
- You're Telling Me (1942) - Charles Handley
- Private Buckaroo (1942) - Colonel Elias Weatherford
- The Affairs of Martha (1942) - Llewellyn Castle
- Star Spangled Rhythm (1942) - Murgatroyd in Priorities Skit
- The Crystal Ball (1943) - Mr. Martin (uncredited)
- Rhythm of the Islands (1943) - Mr. Holton
- This Is the Army (1943) - Soldier's Father (uncredited)
- Fired Wife (1943) - Willie Wilson
- Sleepy Lagoon (1943) - Dudley Joyner
- True to Life (1943) - Oscar Elkins
- Chip Off the Old Block (1944) - Henry McHugh
- Her Primitive Man (1944) - Uncle Hubert
- Pan-Americana (1945) - Uncle Rudy
- Men in Her Diary (1945) - Vernon Williams
- Club Havana (1945) - Willy Kingston
- Life with Blondie (1945) - Theodore Glassby, Apex Advertising
- Night in Paradise (1946) - Scribe
- Always Together (1947) - Mr. Timothy J. Bull, Attorney
- On an Island with You (1948) - Nightclub Waiter (uncredited)
- The Girl from Manhattan (1948) - Homer Purdy
- The Leather Saint (1956) - Father Ritchie
- All Mine to Give (1957) - Dr. Delbert
- Twilight for the Gods (1958) - Reverend Butterfield
- The Twilight Zone (1959) (Season 1 Episode 12: "What You Need") - Pedott
- The Tom Ewell Show (TV series, 1960) Episode: "The Friendly Man" - Mr. Steckel
- Alfred Hitchcock Presents (1961) (Season 6 Episode 29: "Pearl Necklace") - Howard Rutherford
- Alfred Hitchcock Presents (1962) (Season 7 Episode 29: "The Matched Pearl") - Hubert Wilkens
- The Twilight Zone (1962) (Season 3 Episode 21: "Kick the Can") - Charles Whitley
- Bonanza (1964) (Season 6 Episode 8: "Square Deal Sam") - Samuel T. Washburn
- Fluffy (1965) - Claridge
