= Season of the Witch: How the Occult Saved Rock and Roll =

Book about the impact of occult on rock music

- Author: Peter Bebergal
- Language: English
- Subject: Rock and roll, occult
- Genre: Non-fiction
- Published: 2014
- Publisher: Tarcher
- Publication place: United States
- Media type: Print, e-book
- Pages: 288 pages
- ISBN: 0399167668

Season of the Witch: How the Occult Saved Rock and Roll is a 2014 non-fiction book by Peter Bebergal. It was released on October 16, 2014, through Tarcher and examines the occult's influence on music.

== Synopsis ==
In the book, Bebergal examines the influence of the occult and mysticism in music. He examines musicians and musical groups such as Elvis Presley, the Beatles, and Led Zeppelin.

== Reception ==
Critical reception for the book has been mostly positive. NPR gave Season of the Witch a mostly favorable review, criticizing it for leaving out some examples of the occult in music but also remarked that this was one of the book's strengths, stating "that's where Bebergal's selectivity becomes as much of a strength as a weakness. Rather than attempting to throw as many examples at his audience as he can, he focuses on those that best illustrate his point: that the occult, like rock 'n' roll itself, can be illuminating as well as spellbinding". The Washington Post was more critical in their review, writing "Occasionally, Bebergal rewards the dutiful reader with a zinger, as when he describes the Age of Aquarius as having 'ended not with a whimper but with a stabbing at the Rolling Stones’ 1969 concert at the Altamont Speedway'. But he doesn’t drop nearly enough of those gems to make up for his annoying habits — his abuse of 'groove' as a verb, for starters".
