= The Member of the Wedding =

Novel by Carson McCullers

- First edition
- Author: Carson McCullers
- Cover artist: Isaac Haft
- Language: English
- Publisher: Houghton Mifflin Company
- Publication date: 1946
- Publication place: United States
- Media type: Print
- Pages: 176 pp (paperback)
- OCLC: 57134632

The Member of the Wedding is a 1946 novel by Southern writer Carson McCullers. It took McCullers five years to complete, although she interrupted the work for a few months to write the novella The Ballad of the Sad Café.

In a letter to her husband Reeves McCullers, she explained that the novel was "one of those works that the least slip can ruin. It must be beautifully done. For like a poem there is not much excuse for it otherwise."

She originally planned to write a story about a girl who is in love with her piano teacher, but she had what she called "a divine spark: "Suddenly I said: Frankie is in love with her brother and the bride.... The illumination focused the whole book."

== Plot ==
The novel takes place over a few days in late August. It tells the story of 12-year-old tomboy Frankie Addams, who feels disconnected from the world; in her words, an "unjoined person." Frankie's mother died when she was born, and her father is a distant, uncomprehending figure. Her closest companions are the family's African American maid, Berenice Sadie Brown, and her six-year-old cousin, John Henry West. She has no friends in her small Southern town and dreams of going away with her brother and his bride-to-be on their honeymoon in the Alaskan wilderness.

The novel explores the psychology of the three main characters and is more concerned with evocative settings than with incident. Frankie does, however, have a brief and troubling encounter with a soldier. Her hopes of going away are disappointed and, her fantasy destroyed, a short coda reveals how her personality has changed. It also recounts the fate of John Henry West, and Berenice Sadie Brown's future plans.

== Critical interpretations ==
The Member of the Wedding is told from the point of view of Frankie, who is a troubled adolescent. But some critics think it is a mistake to view The Member of the Wedding as simply a coming of age novel—a "sweet momentary illumination of adolescence before the disillusion of adulthood," as it is sometimes regarded, or as Patricia Yaeger puts it, "an economical way of learning about the pangs of growing up."

For Yaeger and the Scots novelist critic Ali Smith, this is to sentimentalize the work. They suggest that such a reading misses much of its profundity, darkness, and what Smith calls its "political heft." It should be seen, according to Smith, as a "very funny, very dark novel" and a "combination of hope, hopelessness and callousness." Its theme, says Smith, is "why people exclude others and what happens when they do."

Other critics, including McKay Jenkins, have highlighted the importance of themes of racial and sexual identity. Frankie wishes people could "change back and forth from boys to girls." John Henry wants them to be "half boy and half girl." Berenice would like there to be "no separate colored people in the world, but all human beings would be light brown color with blue eyes and black hair." For them, Jenkins suggests, the ideal world would be "a place where identity . . . is fluid, changeable, amorphous."

Another critic, Margaret B. McDowell, has also stressed the role of Berenice Sadie Brown (and to a lesser extent John Henry West) in counter-pointing Frankie’s story.

Jack Halberstam, in his book Female Masculinity, uses the character of Frankie to illustrate the pressures on girls to "outgrow" their tomboyishness, arguing that masculinity is tolerated in girls only as long as they ultimately conform to gender expectations in adulthood. In the example of Frankie, he argues, we can see that "the image of the tomboy can be tolerated only within a narrative of blossoming womanhood; within such a narrative, tomboyism represents a resistance to adulthood itself rather than to adult femininity."

Critics such as Elizabeth Freeman and Nicole Seymour view the novel as "queer"—as challenging gender and sexual norms. In her article on the novel, Seymour argues that McCullers queers the human developmental schema (childhood-adolescence-adulthood) through various narrative methods. These methods include the novel's tripartite structure, its depiction of personal difficulties with narrativizing, and "the refusal of dynamism, and the use of the literary devices of repetition and analepsis." Seymour concludes that "the novel allows us to imagine an adolescent body in synchronic rather than diachronic terms—thereby challenging the ideals of sexuality, gender, and race that normally accrue to such bodies."

== Adaptations ==
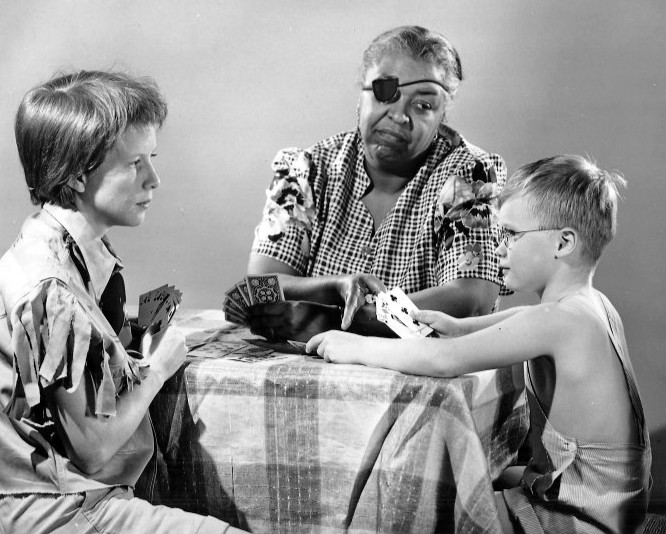
Julie Harris, Ethel Waters and Brandon deWilde in the Broadway production.

The book has been adapted for the stage, motion pictures, and television.

McCullers herself adapted the novel for a Broadway production directed by Harold Clurman. It opened on January 5, 1950 at the Empire Theatre, where it ran for 501 performances. The cast included Ethel Waters, Julie Harris, Margaret Barker, and introduced Brandon deWilde, a seven-year-old second-grader at the time.

Waters, Harris, and deWilde reprised their stage roles, with Arthur Franz, Nancy Gates, and Dickie Moore joining the cast, for the 1952 film version The Member of the Wedding. The screenplay was adapted by Edna and Edward Anhalt and directed by Fred Zinnemann. It was nominated for the Academy Award for Best Actress for Julie Harris, in her debut screen appearance.

A stage musical version, F. Jasmine Addams, was produced Off-Broadway in 1971. Another unauthorized musical adaptation was written by Hugh Martin and Ralph Blane and produced by the University of Alabama at Birmingham's "Town and Gown Theater" in 1987.

A 1982 television adaptation, directed by Delbert Mann, starred Pearl Bailey, Dana Hill and Howard E. Rollins, Jr.

A 1989 Broadway revival production with Roundabout Theatre (directed by Harold Scott, set design by Thomas Cariello) starred Esther Rolle as Berenice, Amelia Campbell as Frankie and Calvin Lennon Armitage as young John Henry.

The 1997 film version, adapted by David W. Rintels and directed by Fielder Cook, starred Anna Paquin, Alfre Woodard, Corey Dunn and Enrico Colantoni. Rintels used the original novel rather than the play as his source material.

The Young Vic theatre in London produced the stage version of The Member of the Wedding in 2007, directed by Matthew Dunster. Frankie Addams was played by Flora Spencer-Longhurst and Berenice Sadie Brown by Portia, a member of Philip Seymour Hoffman's LAByrinth Theater Company.

== References in popular culture ==
Text from The Member of the Wedding was used by Jarvis Cocker on his debut album, Jarvis. It forms the introduction to the 11th song on the album, "Big Julie", and consists of his re-writing of the opening lines of the book. In the original these are:

It happened that green and crazy summer when Frankie was twelve years old. This was the summer when for a long time she had not been a member. She belonged to no club and was a member of nothing in the world. Frankie had become an unjoined person who hung around in doorways, and she was afraid.

The poet Sylvia Plath was known to admire McCullers' work, and the unusual phrase "silver and exact", used by McCullers to describe a set of train tracks in the novel, is the first line of Plath's poem "Mirror".
