= The Motorola Television Hour =

The Motorola Television Hour is an hourlong anthology series that alternated biweekly with The United States Steel Hour on ABC. The show premiered on November 3, 1953. It was originally known as The TV Hour.

Actors who appeared on the series included Eddie Albert, Jane Wyatt, Wallace Ford, Vicki Cummings, Lee Marvin, George Mathews, John Shellie, Ruth Gates, G. Albert Smith, Dickie Allen, Dennis Bohan, and Dan Frazer.

== Production ==
Beginning December 1, 1953, the program was sponsored by Motorola. Directors included Ralph Nelson and Don Richardson. The series aired live from WABC-TV in New York City.

== Episode list ==
No.	Title	Directed by	Teleplay by	Original release date
1	"Outlaw's Reckoning"	Ralph Nelson	Halsted Welles	November 3, 1953
An inn near a much-used bridge becomes a tense waiting place when the bridge is closed. (Episode was originally created for Plymouth Playhouse.)
2	"Westward the Sun"	Unknown	Unknown	November 17, 1953
3	"Brandenburg Gate"	Ralph Nelson	Unknown	December 1, 1953
4	"At Ease"	Unknown	Rod Serling	December 15, 1953
5	"The Thirteen Clocks"	Unknown	James Thurber	December 29, 1953
A prince disguised as a minstrel must save a beautiful princess from her evil uncle.
6	"The Last Days of Hitler"	Unknown	David Davidson	January 12, 1954
Likely based upon the book by historian Hugh Trevor-Roper covering the last ten days of Hitler's life.
7	"Side by Side"	Unknown	William McCleery	January 26, 1954
8	"A Dash of Bitters"	Unknown	Reginald Denham	February 9, 1954
9	"The Muldoon Matter"	Don Richardon	Rod Serling	February 23, 1954
10	"The Family Man"	Unknown	William McCleery	March 9, 1954
11	"Nightmare in Algiers"	Daniel Petrie	Alvin Sapinsley	March 23, 1954
12	"The Sins of the Fathers"	Unknown	David Davidson	April 6, 1954
Based on a 1902 short story by Silas Weir Mitchell.
13	"Black Chiffon"	Unknown	Philip Barry, Jr.	April 20, 1954
Adapted from the 1949 stage play of the same name by Lesley Storm.
14	"Love Song"	Unknown	Unknown	May 4, 1954
15	"Atomic Attack"	Ralph Nelson	David Davidson	May 18, 1954
A family in a New York City suburb deal with the aftermath of an H-bomb attack fifty miles away.
16	"Chivalry at Howling Creek"	Unknown	Unknown	June 1, 1954

== Notable guest actors ==
Actors appearing on the series included:

- Eddie Albert
- Jackie Cooper
- Hume Cronyn
- Cedric Hardwicke
- Helen Hayes
- Oscar Homolka
- Brian Keith
- Lisa Kirk
- Lee Marvin
- Walter Matthau
- Jack Palance
- Roberta Peters
- John Raitt
- Tony Randall
- Basil Rathbone
- Maria Riva
- Phyllis Thaxter
- Christopher Walken
- Jane Wyatt
