= The Season of the Witch =

1971 novel by James Leo Herlihy

- First edition
- Author: James Leo Herlihy
- Language: English
- Publisher: Simon & Schuster (USA)
- Publication date: 1971
- Publication place: United States
- Media type: Print (hardback & paperback)
- Pages: 384 pp (hardback edition)

The Season of the Witch is a novel by James Leo Herlihy. The story is written in the form of a journal that spans three months in the life of teenage runaway Gloria Glyczwycz during the autumn of 1969.

== Plot summary ==
Gloria decides to run away from home with her gay friend John McFadden. Both of them have a reason to leave: Gloria wants to find her estranged father, and John wants to avoid being drafted and being sent to Vietnam. They head from Belle Woods, a fictional suburb of Detroit, Michigan, to New York City, where they meet a host of colorful characters. The novel explores casual drug use, draft evasion, homosexuality, and incest.
