= Blue Denim =

1958 Broadway play by James Leo Herlihy adapted to film in 1959

- Theatrical release poster
- Directed by: Philip Dunne
- Written by: Philip Dunne; Edith Sommer
- Based on: Blue Denim by James Leo Herlihy and William Noble
- Produced by: Charles Brackett
- Starring: Carol Lynley; Brandon deWilde; Macdonald Carey; Marsha Hunt
- Cinematography: Leo Tover
- Edited by: William H. Reynolds
- Music by: Bernard Herrmann
- Distributed by: 20th Century-Fox
- Release date: July 30, 1959
- Running time: 89 minutes
- Country: United States
- Language: English
- Budget: $980,000

Blue Denim is a 1959 American drama film directed by Philip Dunne, and starring Carol Lynley, Brandon deWilde, Warren Berlinger, Macdonald Carey, and Marsha Hunt. Adapted from the Broadway play by James Leo Herlihy and William Noble, it focuses on two teenagers, Arthur and Janet, who navigate their teenage pregnancy. Lynley and Berlinger, who starred in the original Broadway production, reprise their roles in the film.

Dealing with the issues of teenage pregnancy and then-illegal abortion, Blue Denim was met with some controversy at the time of its release. Due to production code mandates at the time, the film does not feature the term "abortion" in its screenplay, and also significantly alters the final act from the stage play.

== Plot ==
In 1950s Dearborn, Michigan, 14-year-old Arthur Bartley lives in a dysfunctional household under the supervision of father Malcolm, a strict former Army major, and his mother, Jessie, both of whom largely ignore their son, instead focusing on the impending wedding of Arthur's older sister, Lillian. Arthur observes his 15-year-old schoolmate Janet, the daughter of an erudite professor, ask Ernie to forge her father's signature on an absentee excuse from school. After Ernie leaves, Janet flatters Arthur and the two kiss.

Later, Arthur and Janet begin dating, and both divulge that they are virgins before Janet initiates having sex. Some months later, Janet reveals to Arthur that she is pregnant. She insists on covertly marrying Arthur to avoid punishment from her father, but the two are denied for being underage. As Jane grows despondent, Arthur asks for Ernie to help him arrange for an abortion. A local soda jerk tells the boys he knows an abortionist. Arthur and Ernie proceed to sell items to try and raise enough money, but come up $90 short. Ernie, who opposes the abortion, suggests that Arthur tell his parents about Janet's pregnancy. Arthur agrees, but when he attempts to tell his mother Lillian, she misinterprets his question as him seeking advice about sex, and an attempt to tell his father also goes unsuccessful.

Out of desperation, Arthur steals a check from his father's checkbook, and has Ernie forge his signature to pay for the abortion. On the day it is to take place, an anxious Janet begs Arthur to cancel the abortion, but proceeds to follow through at Arthur's insistence. Ernie expresses disappointment in Arthur for failing to reveal the pregnancy to his parents. Arthur has a change of mind and confesses to his father, after which he, Janet's father, and Arthur flee to the doctor's office and successfully prevent the abortion from occurring.

Janet, sedated, is taken home with her father, while Arthur's parents realize their failure at providing emotional support for their son and worry about how becoming a teen parent will affect his future. Janet insists that, because she pursued Arthur, that he should not be held responsible to help raise their child. Janet leaves town by train to stay with her aunt and give birth to their child. Arthur, stricken with a sense of responsibility, meets Janet on a train platform where he proposes to her.

== Cast ==
- Carol Lynley as Janet Willard
- Brandon deWilde as Arthur Bartley
- Macdonald Carey as Maj. Malcolm Bartley, Ret.
- Marsha Hunt as Jessie Bartley
- Warren Berlinger as Ernie
- Buck Class as Axel Sorenson
- Nina Shipman as Lillian Bartley
- Vaughn Taylor as Professor Willard
- Roberta Shore as Cherie
- Mary Young as Aunt Bidda
- Malcolm Atterbury as Marriage License Clerk (uncredited)
- William Schallert as George – Bank Vice President (uncredited)

== Production ==
=== Development ===
The play was first announced in 1955. In December 1955, its title was changed to The Children's Comedy. In June 1957 the title was changed back to Blue Denim. Joshua Logan agreed to direct. The play opened February 27, 1958 at the Playhouse Theatre. The New York Times called it "a moving play". It closed after 166 performances.

=== Casting ===
Carol Lynley was cast in the lead role of Janet, reprising the part from the stage play. Actresses Lee Remick, Diane Varsi, and Hope Lange were considered for the part prior to Lynley's casting.

Warren Berlinger joined the cast several months later, also reprising his role. Newcomer Burt Brinckerhoff was the lead male role.

=== Filming ===
Film rights were bought by 20th Century Fox. In August 1958, Fox announced that the leads would be played by Carol Lynley and Ray Stricklyn. In September Lynley was signed to a long-term contract at Fox and Dick Powell was to produce and direct.

In October 1958, Fox assigned Phillip Dunne to write and direct the film. Dunne wrote the script in collaboration with Edith Sommer, who just had a play on Broadway about teenagers titled A Roomful of Roses, which producer Charles Brackett had admired.

Eventually Stricklyn dropped out and the lead was played by Brandon de Wilde. Filming started May 23, 1959.

=== Differences between stage and film versions ===
The play and the film had different endings, and the word abortion in the play was not used in the screenplay.

In the original stage version, Janet does have her fetus aborted, and she and Arthur talk it over later as they settle their feelings for each other. When the play was adapted for Hollywood, however, strict production codes forbade anything but the condemnation of abortion, so the storyline was changed. Arthur and Janet instead get married and stay with Janet's aunt in another city until the baby is born.

== Music ==
The film score for Blue Denim was composed and conducted by Bernard Herrmann. It has been described by Film Score Monthly as a "Baby Vertigo type of score, reminiscent of Herrmann's anguished romantic writing for Hitchcock". The score was released on CD in November 2001.

== Release ==
20th Century Fox promoted Blue Denim using a theatrical trailer prefaced and narrated by Joan Crawford, who commented on the importance of the film's themes.

The film was released on July 30, 1959, by 20th Century Fox at the Victoria Theatre in New York City.

=== Home media ===
20th Century Fox released Blue Denim on DVD on March 16, 2016. Twilight Time released a limited edition Blu-ray disc on April 10, 2018. It plays occasionally on cable TV and video on demand.

== Reception ==
=== Box office ===
According to Dunne, the film was a financial, if not critical, success. In its first week of release in New York it grossed $39,500. Variety called the film a "powerhouse" at the box office.

=== Critical response ===
Bosley Crowther of The New York Times praised Lynley's performance, but was critical of deWilde, describing his acting as "wooden." Variety, while praising Lynley and Berlinger's performances, felt the screenplay had "been considerably watered down."

== Proposed sequel ==
In October 1960 it was announced that Fox was developing a sequel, Blue Denim Baby. It was to be produced by Charles Brackett, and star Lynley and de Wilde. A script had been completed by Samuel Grafton.

In April 1961 Variety reported the film would be made starring Fabian Forte in June from a script by William Noble based on a novel by James Herlihy. In June it was reported Sonia Roberts had finished a script.

However, the movie was never made.

== In other media ==
- In Truman Capote's book In Cold Blood (1966), Bobby Rupp, Nancy Clutter's beau, says "We talked for a while, and made a date to go to the movies Sunday night – a picture all the girls were looking forward to, Blue Denim."
- It is seen briefly in Less than Zero (when Clay and Blair are in bed in the loft).

== See also ==
- List of American films of 1959
