= James Leo Herlihy =

American novelist, playwright, and actor (1927–1993)

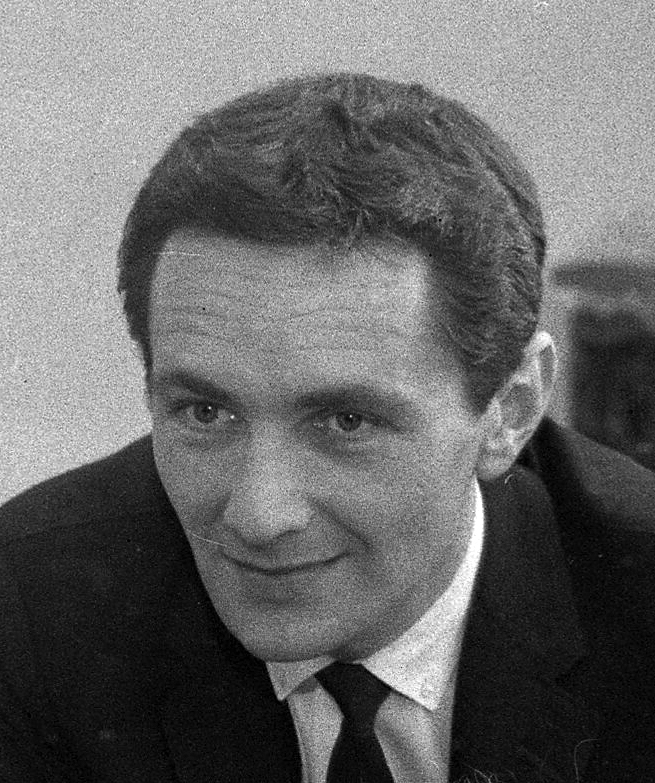
- Born: February 27, 1927; Detroit, Michigan, U.S.
- Died: October 21, 1993 (aged 66); Los Angeles, California, U.S.
- Occupations: Novelist; playwright; actor
- Writing career
- Language: English
- Genre: Fiction

James Leo Herlihy (/ˈhɜːrləhi/; February 27, 1927 – October 21, 1993) was an American novelist, playwright and actor.

His novels Midnight Cowboy and All Fall Down, and his play Blue Denim were adapted for cinema. Other publications include The Season of the Witch and several short stories.

== Biography ==
Herlihy was born into a working-class family in Detroit, Michigan, in 1927. He was raised in Detroit and Chillicothe, Ohio. He enlisted with the Navy in 1945 but saw no action due to the end of World War II. He attended Black Mountain College in North Carolina for two years, where he studied sculpture. He then moved to southern California and attended the Pasadena Playhouse College of the Theatre.

A gay man, Herlihy became a close friend of playwright Tennessee Williams, who served as his mentor. Both spent a significant amount of time in Key West, Florida. Like Williams, Herlihy had lived in New York City. Apart from Key West, the primary home of Herlihy was in the Silver Lake district of Los Angeles. There, another mentor and close friend was French author Anaïs Nin, who shared some of her most secret diaries with him.

== Works ==
Plays he wrote include Streetlight Sonata (1950), Moon in Capricorn (1953), and Blue Denim (produced on Broadway in 1958). He directed actress Tallulah Bankhead in a touring production of his play Crazy October in 1959. Three of his one-act plays, titled collectively Stop, You're Killing Me were presented by the Theater Company of Boston in 1969. According to author Sean Egan in his biography of James Kirkwood Jr., Ponies & Rainbows, Herlihy co-wrote the play UTBU with Kirkwood but demanded his name be taken off the credits.

Herlihy wrote three novels: All Fall Down (1960), Midnight Cowboy (1965), and The Season of the Witch (1971). His short stories were collected in The Sleep of Baby Filbertson and Other Stories (1959) and A Story That Ends in a Scream and Eight Others (1967), a collection which included plays.

=== Acting roles ===
Herlihy appeared as a guest star in "A Bunch of Lonely Pagliaccis," a 1962 episode of the TV series Route 66. He acted in the movie In the French Style (1963) with Jean Seberg. Herlihy also acted in Edward Albee's play The Zoo Story in 1963 in Boston and Paris, and in the 1981 film Four Friends directed by Arthur Penn.

=== Tax protest ===
In 1968, Herlihy signed the "Writers and Editors War Tax Protest" pledge, vowing to refuse tax payments as a protest against the Vietnam War. He later also became a sponsor of the War Tax Resistance project, which practiced and advocated tax resistance as a form of protest against the war.

== Death ==
Herlihy died by suicide at the age of 66, by taking an overdose of sleeping pills in Los Angeles.

== Bibliography ==
=== Novels ===
- All Fall Down (1960)
- Midnight Cowboy (1965)
- The Season of the Witch (1971)

=== Plays ===
- Streetlight Sonata (1950)
- Moon in Capricorn (1953)
- Blue Denim (1958)
- Crazy October (1959)
- Stop, You're Killing Me: Three Short Plays (1969)

=== Collections ===
- The Sleep of Baby Filbertson and Other Stories (1958)
- A Story That Ends with a Scream and Eight Others (1967)
