= Brandon deWilde =

American theater, film, television actor (1942–1972)

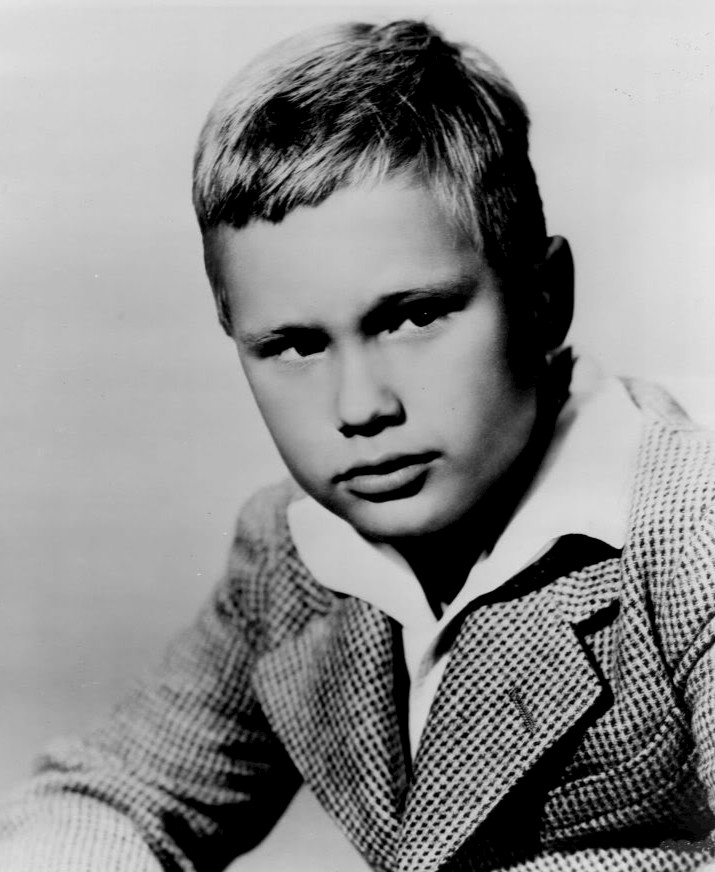
- deWilde in a publicity still for Jamie (1953–54).
- Born: Andre Brandon deWilde; April 9, 1942; New York City, U.S.
- Died: July 6, 1972 (aged 30); Denver, Colorado, U.S.
- Occupation: Actor
- Years active: 1950–1972
- Notable work: The Member of the Wedding, Shane, Blue Denim, Hud, In Harm's Way
- Spouses: Susan M. Maw (m. 1963; div. 1969) Janice Gero (m. 1972)
- Children: 1
- Awards: See below

Andre Brandon deWilde (April 9, 1942 – July 6, 1972) was an American actor, who had a successful career as both a child actor and in adulthood, on both stage and screen. Born into a theatrical family in Brooklyn, he debuted on Broadway at the age of seven and became a national phenomenon by the time he completed his 492 performances for The Member of the Wedding. He won a Donaldson Award for his performance, becoming the youngest actor to win one, and starred in the subsequent film adaptation, for which he won a Golden Globe Award.

DeWilde also played Joey Starrett in the film Shane (1953), for which he was nominated for the Academy Award for Best Supporting Actor. He also starred in his own sitcom Jamie on ABC and became a household name, making numerous radio and TV appearances before being featured on the cover of Life magazine on March 10, 1952, for his second Broadway outing, Mrs. McThing.

He continued acting in stage, film and television roles into adulthood, notably costarring with Paul Newman in Hud (1963), before his death at age 30 in a car crash in Colorado on July 6, 1972.

== Early life ==
Andre Brandon deWilde was the son of Frederic A. "Fritz" deWilde and Eugenia (née Wilson) deWilde. Fritz deWilde was the only son of Dutch immigrants, who changed their surname from Neitzel-de Wilde to deWilde when they emigrated to the United States. He was a descendant of the Dutch merchant and seigneur Andries de Wilde, who was married to Cornelia Henrica Neitzel. Fritz deWilde became an actor and Broadway production stage manager. Eugenia was a part-time stage actress.

After deWilde's birth, the family moved from Brooklyn to Baldwin, Long Island.

== Career ==
=== Acting ===
DeWilde made his Broadway debut at the age of seven in The Member of the Wedding, based on the Carson McCullers's novel of the same name. He was the first child actor to win the Donaldson Award, and his talent was praised by John Gielgud the following year. He also starred in the 1952 film version of the play, which was directed by Fred Zinnemann.

In 1952, he acted in Shane as Joey Starrett and was nominated for an Academy Award for Best Supporting Actor for his performance, becoming the youngest nominee at the time in a competitive category. He starred in his own television series, Jamie, which aired in 1953 and 1954. Although the series was popular, it was canceled because of a contract dispute. In 1956, he was featured with Walter Brennan, Phil Harris and Sidney Poitier in the coming-of-age Batjac film production of Good-bye, My Lady, adapted from James Street's book.

DeWilde's soft-spoken manner of speech in his early roles was more akin to a Southern drawl. In 1956, at the age of 14, deWilde narrated the classical music works Peter and the Wolf by Sergei Prokofiev and The Young Person's Guide to the Orchestra by Benjamin Britten. He also recorded a reading of Huckleberry Finn on the album The Stories of Mark Twain along with his Good-bye, My Lady co-star Brennan.

DeWilde shared an onscreen camaraderie with both James Stewart and Audie Murphy in the 1957 Western Night Passage. In 1958, deWilde starred in The Missouri Traveler, sharing lead billing with Lee Marvin in another coming-of-age film, this one set in the early 1900s. At the age of 17, he played an adolescent father in the 1959 drama Blue Denim. He guest-starred on many TV series, including Alcoa Theatre and the popular Western series Wagon Train. He had a lead role in the 1961 Pigeons from Hell episode of Boris Karloff’s Thriller (American TV series) anthology, which writer Stephen King claimed was the scariest episode of them all.

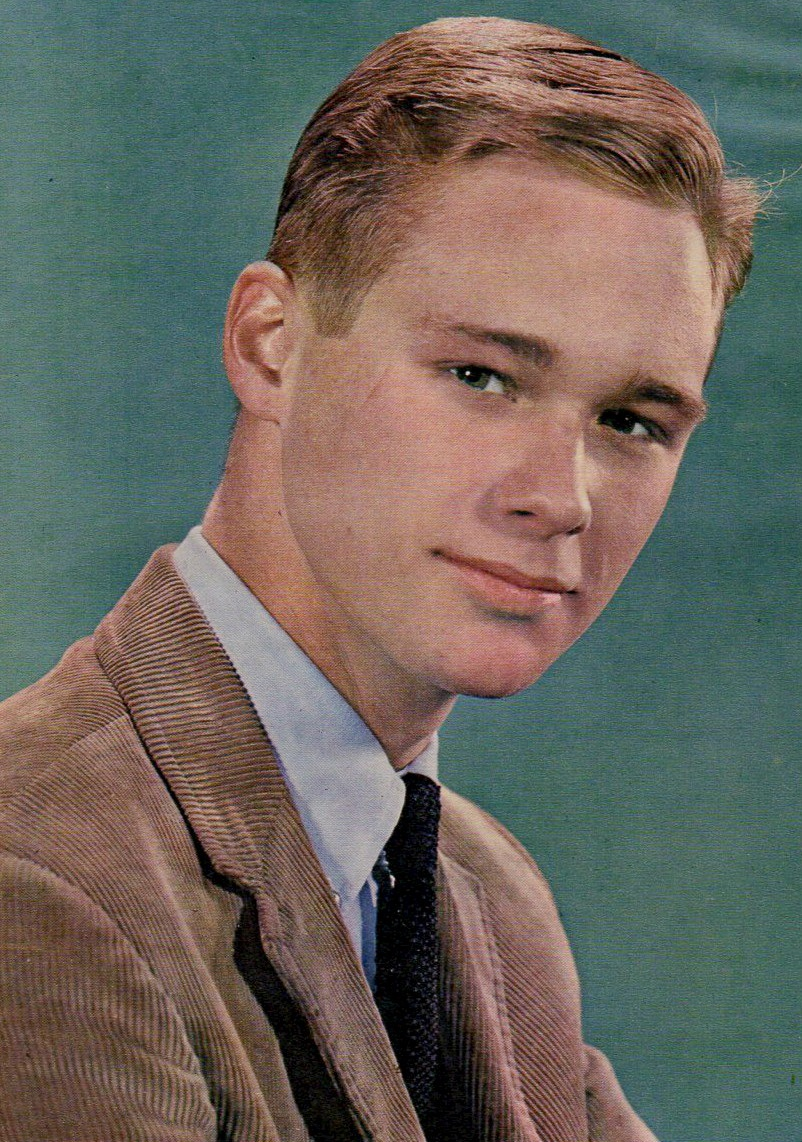
Brandon deWilde, 1963

In 1961, deWilde appeared in the Alfred Hitchcock Presents episode "The Sorcerer's Apprentice" as Hugo, a mentally impaired youth who cannot separate fact from fantasy. After seeing a magician saw a woman in half at a carnival, Hugo emulates the trick and kills a woman by sawing her in half. The episode never aired on NBC because the finale was deemed too gruesome by 1960s television standards.

The following years, deWilde appeared in All Fall Down (1962), opposite Warren Beatty, Angela Lansbury, Eva Marie Saint, and Karl Malden; and in Martin Ritt's Hud (1963), co-starring with Paul Newman, Patricia Neal, and Melvyn Douglas. Although the only lead actor not to be Oscar-nominated for Hud, deWilde accepted the Best Supporting Actor trophy on behalf of costar Melvyn Douglas (who was in Spain at the time). That same year, he appeared in Jack Palance's ABC circus drama The Greatest Show on Earth.

DeWilde signed a two-picture deal with Disney in 1964. He first starred in The Tenderfoot, a three-part comedy Western for Walt Disney's Wonderful World of Color TV show with Brian Keith. The following year, he and Keith starred in Those Calloways, reuniting deWilde with his Good-bye, My Lady star Walter Brennan. Also in 1965, deWilde played PT boat officer Jere Torry, serving under his admiral father played by John Wayne, in the Pacific theater World War II drama In Harm's Way (1965).

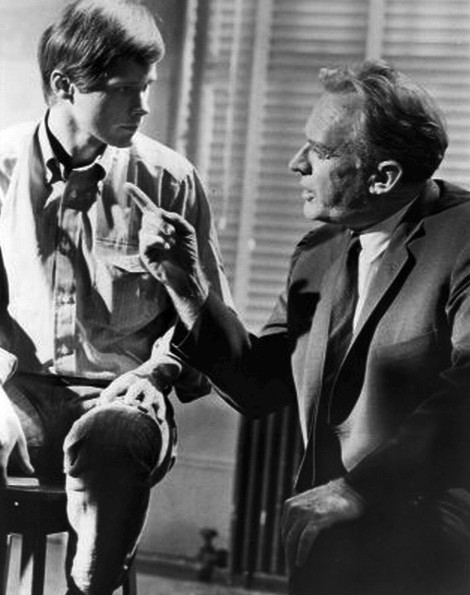
DeWilde with Arthur Kennedy in "The Confession" on 'ABC Stage 67' in 1966

After 1965, many of his roles were limited to television guest appearances. "Being small for his age and a bit too pretty ... in his favour as a child ... worked against him as an adult," wrote author Linda Ashcroft after talking with deWilde at a party, "He spoke of giving up movies until he could come back as a forty-year-old character actor." DeWilde's final western role was in Dino De Laurentiis' 1971 spaghetti Western The Deserter, one year before his death. He made his last screen appearance in Wild in the Sky (1972), an action comedy about hippies during the Vietnam War.

DeWilde's final appearance on a stage was at the Elitch Theatre in Denver in a two-week run of Butterflies Are Free, costarring Maureen O'Sullivan and Karen Grassle. The play's last performance was on July 1, 1972.

=== Music ===
DeWilde had hoped to embark on a music career. He asked his friend Gram Parsons (later of the Byrds and founder of the seminal country rock band the Flying Burrito Brothers) and his International Submarine Band to back him in a recording session. ISB guitarist John Nuese claimed that deWilde sang harmony with Parsons better than anyone except Emmylou Harris. Bassist Ian Dunlop wrote, "The lure of getting a record out was tugging hard at Brandon."

Parsons and Harris later co-wrote a song titled "In My Hour of Darkness", the first verse of which refers to the car crash that killed deWilde.

== Personal life ==
DeWilde was married twice and had one son. His first marriage was to writer Susan M. Maw, who he wed in 1963. The couple had a son, Jesse, before divorcing in 1969. He married Janice Gero in April 1972, three months before his death.

=== Death ===
On July 6, 1972, while in Colorado for a Denver stage production of Butterflies Are Free, deWilde was killed in a traffic accident in the Denver suburb of Lakewood. He was driving in a camper van that left the roadway before striking a guardrail and a parked truck. The van rolled onto its side, and he was pinned in the wreckage. He was taken to St. Anthony Hospital, where he died at 7:20 p.m. of multiple injuries that included a broken back, neck and leg. He was 30 years old.

== Filmography ==
=== Film ===
Year	Title	Role	Notes
1952	The Member of the Wedding	John Henry	
1953	Shane	Joey Starrett	
1956	Good-bye, My Lady	Skeeter Jackson	
1957	Night Passage	Joey Adams	
1958	The Missouri Traveler	Biarn Turner	
1959	Blue Denim	Arthur Bartley	
1962	All Fall Down	Clinton Willart	
1963	Hud	Lon "Lonnie" Bannon	
1963	A Gathering of Eagles	Bill Fowler Jr.	Uncredited
1965	Those Calloways	Bucky Calloway	
1965	In Harm's Way	Ensign Jeremiah "Jere" Torrey	
1967	The Trip	Extra	Uncredited
1971	The Deserter	Lieutenant Ferguson	
1972	Wild in the Sky	Josh	

=== Television ===
Year	Title	Role	Notes
1951–52	The Philco Television Playhouse		Episodes: "No Medals on Pop" and "A Cowboy for Chris"
1953–54	Jamie	Jamie McHummer	Main role
1955	Climax!	Robbie Eunson	Episode: "The Day They Gave Babies Away"
1956	Climax!	Tip Malone	Episode: "An Episode of Sparrows"
1956	Screen Director's Playhouse	Terry Johnson	Episode: "Partners"
1957	The United States Steel Hour	David	Episode: "The Locked Door"
1959	Alcoa Theatre	George Adams	Episode: "Man of His House"
1959–61	Wagon Train	Daniel Morgan Benedict III, Mark Miner	Episodes: "The Danny Benedict Story" and "The Mark Miner Story"
1961	Thriller	Timothy Branner	Episode: "Pigeons from Hell"
1961	Alfred Hitchcock Presents	Hugo	Episode: "The Sorcerer's Apprentice"
1962	The Virginian	James 'Mike Flynn' Cafferty	Episode: "50 Days to Moose Jaw"
1963	The Nurses	Paul Marker	Episode: "Ordeal"
1964	The Greatest Show on Earth	Vic Hawkins	Episode: "Love the Giver"
1964	The Tenderfoot	Jim Tevis	Miniseries; 3 episodes
1964	12 O'Clock High	Corporal Ross Lawrence	Episode: "Here's to Courageous Cowards"
1965	The Defenders	Roger Bailey, Jr.	Episode: "The Objector"
1966	Combat!	Wilder	Episode: "A Sudden Terror"
1966	ABC Stage 67	Carl Boyer	Episode: "The Confession"
1968	The Virginian	Walt Bradbury	Episode: "The Orchard"
1968	Journey to the Unknown	Alec Worthing	Episode: "One on an Island"
1968	Insight	Weissberg	Episode: "Confrontation"
1969	The Name of the Game	Bobby Currier	Episode: "The Bobby Currier Story"
1969	Hawaii Five-O	Arnold Potter	Episode: "King Kamehameha Blues"
1969	Love, American Style	Jimmy Devlin	Season 1 episode 12, Segment: "Love and the Bachelor"
1970	The Virginian	Rem Garvey	Episode: "Gun Quest"
1970	The Young Rebels	Young Nathan Hale	Episode: "To Hang a Hero"
1971	Night Gallery	Johnson	Episode: "Death in the Family/The Merciful/Class of '99/Witches' Feast"
1971	Ironside	George Whittaker	Episode: "In the Line of Duty"

== Awards and nominations ==
Award	Year	Category	Work	Result	Ref.
Academy Award	1953	Best Supporting Actor	Shane	Nominated	
Golden Globe Award	1953	Best Juvenile Performance	The Member of the Wedding (film)	Won	
Donaldson Award	1950	Best Male Debut	The Member of the Wedding (play)	Won	

== See also ==
- List of child prodigies
- List of youngest Academy Award nominees (Best Supporting Actor)
