= The Twilight Zone season 3 =

The Twilight Zone
- Season 3
- No. of episodes: 37

Release
- Original network: CBS
- Original release: September 15, 1961 – June 1, 1962

Season chronology
- ← Previous; Season 2 Next → Season 4

The third season of The Twilight Zone aired Fridays at 10:00–10:30 pm (EST) on CBS from September 15, 1961 to June 1, 1962. There are 37 episodes.

Continuing with Marius Constant's theme music, a different set of graphics was used for the opening, consisting of a rotating cone with concentric circles suggesting a spiral, receding into a star field. Rod Serling's narration from the second season was used, with the verse "That's the signpost up ahead" taken out:

"You're traveling through another dimension. A dimension not only of sight and sound but of mind. A journey into a wondrous land whose boundaries are that of imagination. Your next stop—The Twilight Zone." Some subtle changes in the opening's acoustics were made beginning with "Little Girl Lost".

== Episodes ==
No. overall	No. in season	Title	Directed by	Written by	Music by	Original release date	Prod. code
66	1	"Two"	Montgomery Pittman	Montgomery Pittman	Van Cleave	September 15, 1961	4802
67	2	"The Arrival"	Boris Sagal	Rod Serling	N/A	September 22, 1961	4814
68	3	"The Shelter"	Lamont Johnson	Rod Serling	N/A	September 29, 1961	4803
69	4	"The Passersby"	Elliot Silverstein	Rod Serling	Fred Steiner	October 6, 1961	4817
70	5	"A Game of Pool"	Buzz Kulik	George Clayton Johnson	N/A	October 13, 1961	4815
71	6	"The Mirror"	Don Medford	Rod Serling	N/A	October 20, 1961	4819
72	7	"The Grave"	Montgomery Pittman	Montgomery Pittman	N/A	October 27, 1961	3656
73	8	"It's a Good Life"	James Sheldon	Based on a short story by : Jerome Bixby; Teleplay by : Rod Serling	N/A	November 3, 1961	4801
74	9	"Deaths-Head Revisited"	Don Medford	Rod Serling	N/A	November 10, 1961	4804
75	10	"The Midnight Sun"	Anton Leader	Rod Serling	Van Cleave	November 17, 1961	4818
76	11	"Still Valley"	James Sheldon	Based on a short story by : Manly Wade Wellman; Teleplay by : Rod Serling	Wilbur Hatch	November 24, 1961	4808
77	12	"The Jungle"	William F. Claxton	Charles Beaumont	N/A	December 1, 1961	4806
78	13	"Once Upon a Time"	Norman Z. McLeod	Richard Matheson	William Lava; Ray Turner	December 15, 1961	4820
79	14	"Five Characters in Search of an Exit"	Lamont Johnson	Based on a short story by : Marvin Petal; Teleplay by : Rod Serling	N/A	December 22, 1961	4805
80	15	"A Quality of Mercy"	Buzz Kulik	Based on an idea by : Sam Rolfe; Teleplay by : Rod Serling	N/A	December 29, 1961	4809
81	16	"Nothing in the Dark"	Lamont Johnson	George Clayton Johnson	N/A	January 5, 1962	3662
82	17	"One More Pallbearer"	Lamont Johnson	Rod Serling	N/A	January 12, 1962	4823
83	18	"Dead Man's Shoes"	Montgomery Pittman	Charles Beaumont	N/A	January 19, 1962	4824
84	19	"The Hunt"	Harold Schuster	Earl Hamner, Jr.	Robert Drasnin	January 26, 1962	4810
85	20	"Showdown with Rance McGrew"	Christian Nyby	Based on an idea by : Frederic Louis Fox; Teleplay by : Rod Serling	N/A	February 2, 1962	4812
86	21	"Kick the Can"	Lamont Johnson	George Clayton Johnson	N/A	February 9, 1962	4821
87	22	"A Piano in the House"	David Greene	Earl Hamner, Jr.	N/A	February 16, 1962	4825
88	23	"The Last Rites of Jeff Myrtlebank"	Montgomery Pittman	Montgomery Pittman	Tommy Morgan	February 23, 1962	4811
89	24	"To Serve Man"	Richard L. Bare	Based on a short story by : Damon Knight; Teleplay by : Rod Serling	N/A	March 2, 1962	4807
90	25	"The Fugitive"	Richard L. Bare	Charles Beaumont	N/A	March 9, 1962	4816
91	26	"Little Girl Lost"	Paul Stewart	Richard Matheson	Bernard Herrmann	March 16, 1962	4828
92	27	"Person or Persons Unknown"	John Brahm	Charles Beaumont	N/A	March 23, 1962	4829
93	28	"The Little People"	William F. Claxton	Rod Serling	N/A	March 30, 1962	4822
94	29	"Four O'Clock"	Lamont Johnson	Based on a short story by : Price Day; Teleplay by : Rod Serling	N/A	April 6, 1962	4832
95	30	"Hocus-Pocus and Frisby"	Lamont Johnson	Based on a story by : Frederic Louis Fox; Teleplay by : Rod Serling	Tommy Morgan	April 13, 1962	4833
96	31	"The Trade-Ins"	Elliot Silverstein	Rod Serling	N/A	April 20, 1962	4831
97	32	"The Gift"	Allen H. Miner	Rod Serling	Laurindo Almeida	April 27, 1962	4830
98	33	"The Dummy"	Abner Biberman	Based on a story by : Lee Polk; Teleplay by : Rod Serling	N/A	May 4, 1962	4834
99	34	"Young Man's Fancy"	John Brahm	Richard Matheson	Nathan Scott	May 11, 1962	4813
100	35	"I Sing the Body Electric"	William F. Claxton and James Sheldon	Ray Bradbury	Van Cleave	May 18, 1962	4826
101	36	"Cavender Is Coming"	Christian Nyby	Rod Serling	N/A	May 25, 1962	4827
102	37	"The Changing of the Guard"	Robert Ellis Miller	Rod Serling	N/A	June 1, 1962	4835
