= Once Upon a Time (The Twilight Zone) =

- The Twilight Zone episode
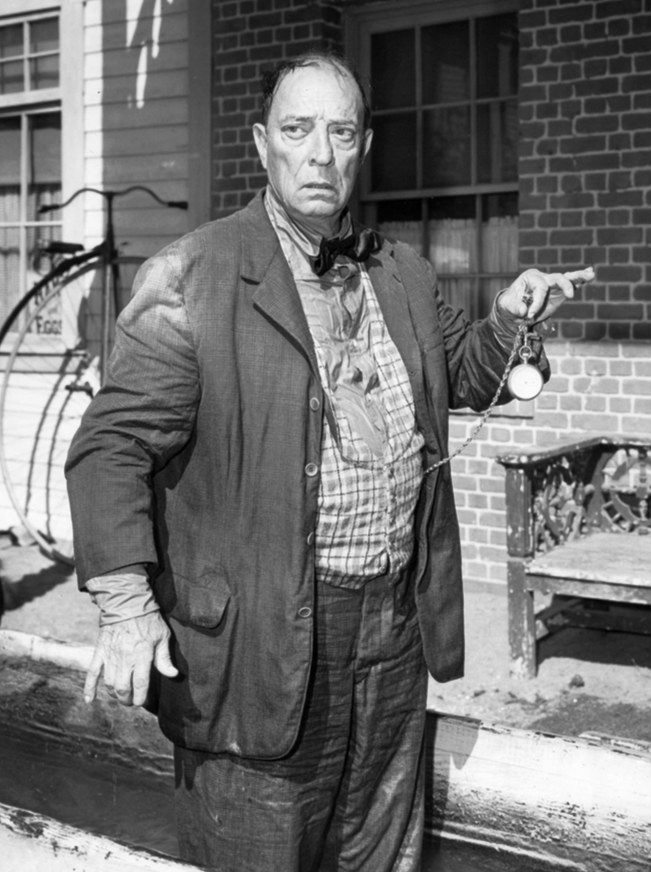
- Keaton as Woodrow Mulligan
- Episode no.: Season 3 Episode 13
- Directed by: Norman Z. McLeod
- Written by: Richard Matheson
- Production code: 4820
- Original air date: December 15, 1961

Guest appearances
- Buster Keaton; Stanley Adams; Jesse White; James Flavin; Gil Lamb; Milton Parsons; Warren Parker; Harry Fleer; George E. Stone

Episode chronology
← Previous "The Jungle"	Next → "Five Characters in Search of an Exit"
- The Twilight Zone (1959 TV series) (season 3)

"Once Upon a Time" is episode 78 of the American television anthology series The Twilight Zone. It originally aired on December 15, 1961. It features early film star Buster Keaton in one of his later roles, as an unlikely time traveler, and the opening and closing scenes pay tribute to the silent films for which he was famous.

== Opening narration ==
Mr. Mulligan, a rather dour critic of his times, is shortly to discover the import of that old phrase, 'Out of the frying pan into the fire'—said fire burning brightly at all times—in The Twilight Zone.

== Plot ==
Woodrow Mulligan is a grumpy man in 1890, dissatisfied with what his world has come to: the nation's budget surplus is only 85 million dollars, prices are shockingly high to him, and his once-quiet town of Harmony, New York, is bustling with livestock roaming the streets, which are full of horse-drawn carriages and penny-farthing bicycles moving at the speed limit of 8 mph. A collision with a bicyclist dumps him in a water trough, forcing him to take off his pants to dry them when he gets to his place of work.

He works as janitor for Professor Gilbert, who has just invented a "time helmet", which can transport the wearer to another decade for 30 minutes. Mulligan tries it on and it sends him to 1961; Harmony is now a busy city with streets full of cars, all sorts of urban noise, and astonishingly high prices. In the chaos he loses the helmet, which is picked up by a boy on roller skates, requiring Mulligan to give chase on a contemporary bicycle. He recovers the damaged helmet as he runs into Rollo, a scientist. They take the helmet to a "fix it" shop, where Rollo and the proprietor argue over repairs, while Mulligan wanders off to acquire a pair of pants.

Rollo regards the 1890s as an idyllic period, and wants to go back there in Mulligan's place. He runs off with the helmet, but Mulligan catches him at the last instant and they both go back. Mulligan is relieved to be home, and Rollo finds it charming. A week later, Mulligan has found a new appreciation for life in 1890, but Rollo is dismayed at the lack of technology and modern comforts. Annoyed by Rollo's griping, Mulligan sets the helmet for 1961, puts it on Rollo's head, and sends him back to his own time.

== Closing narration ==
'To each his own'—so goes another old phrase to which Mr. Woodrow Mulligan would heartily subscribe, for he has learned—definitely the hard way—that there's much wisdom in a third old phrase, which goes as follows: 'Stay in your own backyard.' To which it might be added, 'and, if possible, assist others to stay in theirs'—via, of course, The Twilight Zone.

== Cast ==
- Buster Keaton as Woodrow Mulligan
- Stanley Adams as Rollo
- Milton Parsons as Professor Gilbert
- Gil Lamb as Officer Flannagan
- James Flavin as First 1961 Policeman
- Harry Fleer as Second 1961 Policeman
- Warren Parker as Clothing Store Manager
- Jesse White as Repairman
- George E. Stone as Fenwick

== Production ==
Buster Keaton was once one of the biggest stars of the silent era, and this episode featuring him was intended as an homage to that work. One sequence, occurring almost immediately after traveling to the episode's present day, is a near exact replication of a gag Keaton introduced some forty-one years earlier in a Fatty Arbuckle film titled The Garage.

The parts set in the 1890s are done in the style of a silent film with intertitles and feature only a soundtrack of a saloon piano (and Rod Serling's customary opening and closing narration). The music was composed by William Lava and was performed by veteran Hollywood studio and session pianist Ray Turner.

Much is made of the fact that Mulligan shows up in 1961 with no pants due to his getting run over by a "high speed" bicycle and falling into a water trough, forcing him to remove the pants while they dry. A running gag has a pants-less Mulligan being chased by a policeman in both the past and the present.
