= The Obsolete Man =

- The Twilight Zone episode
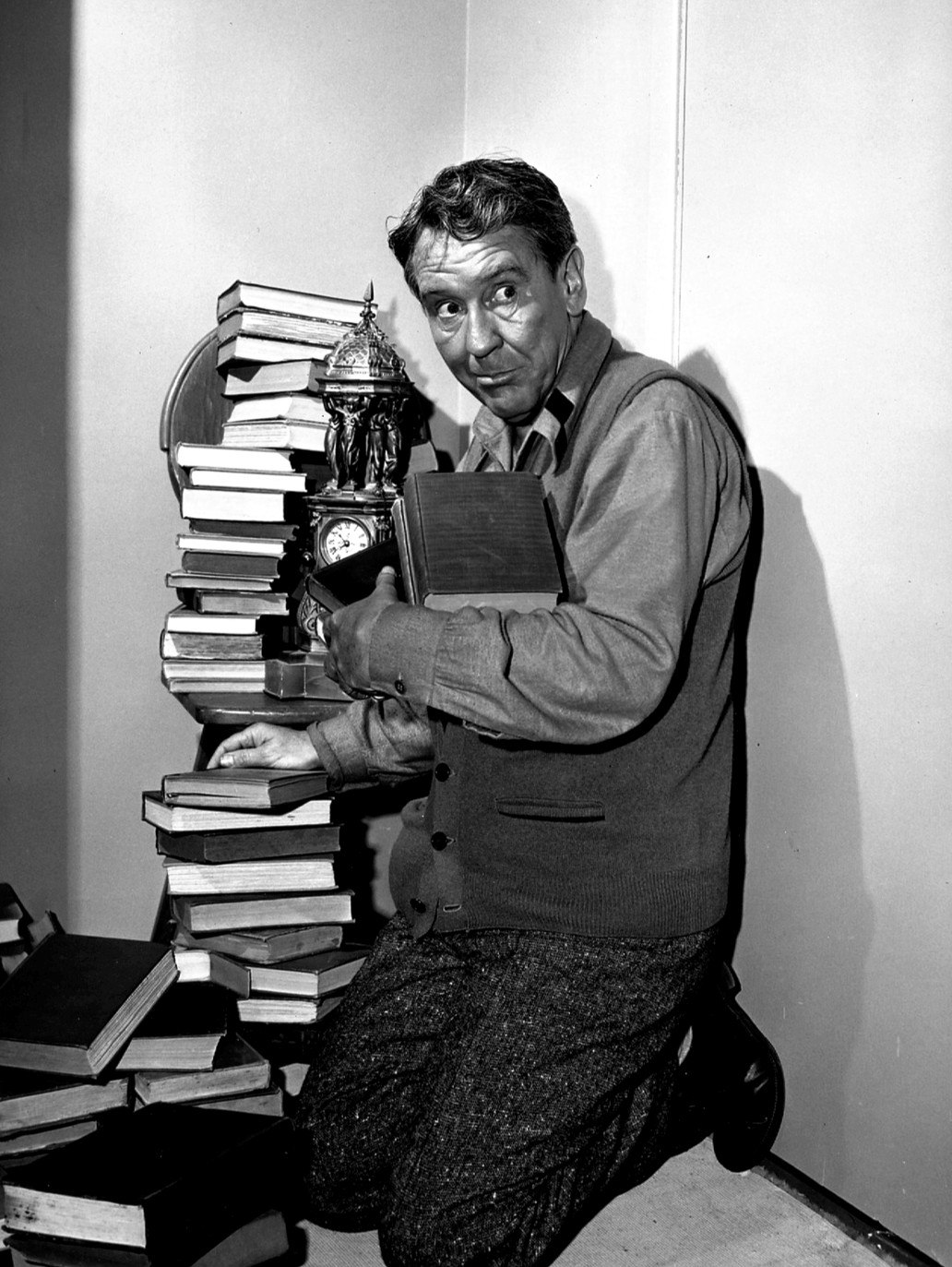
- Burgess Meredith as Romney Wordsworth in "The Obsolete Man"
- Episode no.: Season 2 Episode 29
- Directed by: Elliot Silverstein
- Written by: Rod Serling
- Production code: 173-3661
- Original air date: June 2, 1961

Guest appearances
- Burgess Meredith as Romney Wordsworth; Fritz Weaver as the Chancellor; Josip Elic as the Subaltern

Episode chronology
← Previous "Will the Real Martian Please Stand Up?"	Next → "Two"
- The Twilight Zone (1959 TV series, season 2)

"The Obsolete Man" is episode 65 of the American television anthology series The Twilight Zone, starring Burgess Meredith as Romney Wordsworth, the accused, and Fritz Weaver as the Chancellor (and prosecutor). It originally aired on June 2, 1961, on CBS. The story was later adapted for The Twilight Zone Radio Dramas starring Jason Alexander as Wordsworth.

== Opening narration ==
You walk into this room at your own risk, because it leads to the future, not a future that will be but one that might be. This is not a new world, it is simply an extension of what began in the old one. It has patterned itself after every dictator who has ever planted the ripping imprint of a boot on the pages of history since the beginning of time. It has refinements, technological advances, and a more sophisticated approach to the destruction of human freedom. But like every one of the super-states that preceded it, it has one iron rule: logic is an enemy and truth is a menace. This is Mr. Romney Wordsworth, in his last 48 hours on Earth. He's a citizen of the State but will soon have to be eliminated, because he's built out of flesh and because he has a mind. Mr. Romney Wordsworth, who will draw his last breaths - in the Twilight Zone.

== Plot ==
In a future totalitarian state, Romney Wordsworth is put on trial for being obsolete. His professed occupation as a librarian is punishable by death, as the State has eliminated books. His faith in God is taken as further proof of obsolescence, as the atheist state claims to have proven God does not exist. Following a bitter exchange, the Chancellor finds Wordsworth guilty and sentences him to death within 48 hours, allowing him to choose his method and exact time and place of execution. Wordsworth requests that he be granted a personal assassin, who will be the only one who knows the method of his death, and that his execution be televised nationwide from his room at midnight on the following day. Although Wordsworth's demand is unprecedented, the Chancellor grants both requests.

At 11:15 the following night, the Chancellor visits Wordsworth in his now-monitored room, responding to the latter's invitation out of curiosity. Wordsworth reveals that he has chosen to die in a bomb explosion at midnight. The Chancellor expresses approval until Wordsworth further states that he has locked the door, and the Chancellor will die with him. He also points out that as the events are being broadcast live, the State would risk losing its status in the people's eyes if it chooses to rescue the Chancellor. Wordsworth brings out an illegal, long-hidden copy of the Bible, reading Psalm 23 and portions of several other psalms aloud to express his trust in God.

In the final minute before midnight, the Chancellor breaks down and begs to be let go "in the name of God". Wordsworth agrees to do so and gives him the key to unlock the door. The Chancellor flees from the room just before the bomb explodes, killing Wordsworth. Due to his cowardly display in Wordsworth's room and invocation of God, the Chancellor is replaced by his own subaltern and declared obsolete. He protests against this verdict and tries to escape, but the tribunal's attendants overwhelm him and beat him to death.

== Closing narration ==
Unusually, Serling appears on camera to deliver the closing narration.

The Chancellor, the late Chancellor, was only partly correct. He was obsolete. But so was the State, the entity he worshiped. Any state, any entity, any ideology that fails to recognize the worth, the dignity, the rights of Man...that state is obsolete. A case to be filed under "M" for "Mankind" – in the Twilight Zone.

== Cast ==
- Burgess Meredith as Romney Wordsworth
- Fritz Weaver as the Chancellor
- Josip Elic as the Subaltern
- Harry Fleer as Guard
- Harold Innocent as Man in Crowd

== Original epilogue ==
Usually Serling delivered his closing narration off-camera, but for the earlier episode ("A World of His Own"), Serling delivered the closing narration of that episode on-camera, as he would for "The Obsolete Man" and season three's "The Fugitive". Serling's original narration was longer, but the middle section was cut for broadcast. As scripted, the original narration reads as follows (with the cut section in italics):

The Chancellor, the late Chancellor, was only partly correct. He was obsolete, but so was the State, the entity he worshipped. Any state, entity, or ideology becomes obsolete when it stockpiles the wrong weapons; when it captures territories, but not minds; when it enslaves millions, but convinces nobody. When it is naked, yet puts on armor and calls it faith, while in the Eyes of God it has no faith at all. Any state, any entity, any ideology that fails to recognize the worth, the dignity, the rights of Man...that state is obsolete. A case to be filed under "M" for "Mankind" - in the Twilight Zone.

== In popular culture ==
Serling's opening narration is sampled in the song "Axle Grinder" by Australian drum and bass band Pendulum, as well as "Thieves! (Screamed the Ghost)" by American hip-hop duo Run the Jewels on their 2016 album, Run the Jewels 3. The climatic scene is sampled throughout the song "Playdough" from the album The Citizen Abortion by American punk rock band Toys That Kill. Two lines from the hearing scene were sampled in industrial groove metal band Death Therapy's songs "Prodigal" and "Possessed" on the album The Storm Before the Calm.
