= Two (The Twilight Zone) =

- The Twilight Zone episode
- Episode no.: Season 3 Episode 1
- Directed by: Montgomery Pittman
- Written by: Montgomery Pittman
- Production code: 4802
- Original air date: September 15, 1961

Guest appearances
- Charles Bronson as Man; Elizabeth Montgomery as Woman

Episode chronology
← Previous "The Obsolete Man"	Next → "The Arrival"
- The Twilight Zone (1959 TV series) (season 3)

"Two" is the season 3 premiere and 66th episode overall of the American television anthology series The Twilight Zone. The episode stars Charles Bronson and Elizabeth Montgomery.

The radio adaptation of this episode starred Don Johnson in Bronson's role.

== Opening narration ==
This is a jungle, a monument built by nature honoring disuse, commemorating a few years of nature being left to its own devices. But it's another kind of jungle, the kind that comes in the aftermath of man's battles against himself. Hardly an important battle, not a Gettysburg, or a Marne, or an Iwo Jima; more like one insignificant corner patch in the crazy quilt of combat. But it was enough to end the existence of this little city. It's been five years since a human being walked these streets. This is the first day of the sixth year, as man used to measure time. The time: perhaps a hundred years from now, or sooner. Or perhaps it's already happened two million years ago. The place: the signposts are in English so that we may read them more easily, but the place is the Twilight Zone.

== Plot ==
A woman wearing a tattered uniform stumbles into a deserted city. She spots what was a restaurant and finds a can of chicken in the kitchen. A man in a different, well-worn uniform soon enters the kitchen, and after a brief scuffle, knocks her out and eats half the chicken. He later wakes the woman by dumping a pot of water on her face. He says there is no reason to fight anymore, as there are no more armies, but eventually realizes that she cannot understand him and departs. She eats the canned chicken he left for her.

The woman tracks him down, and they wander down the street, coming to a movie theater. He stares at a poster for a wartime romance film and turns to smile at her. They find the skeletal remains of soldiers at the theater entrance and abruptly grab the rifles of the dead owners, simultaneously aiming at each other. After a tense moment, the man turns and walks away, slinging his weapon over his shoulder.

The woman follows him, and the two walk along the city street. They stop in front of a store with a cocktail dress in the smashed display window. Upon her saying "Prekrasnyy" (Russian for "beautiful"), he hands the dress to her and tells her to put it on. She enters an office next to the department store to change into the dress, but then she notices the jingoistic enlistment posters on the wall and realizes it is a recruiting office for the other side. She grabs her rifle, exits the office and angrily shoots at the man twice, but misses. He gets up, looks at her incredulously, and walks away.

The next morning, the man has changed out of his uniform into a tuxedo without a shirt and has found two jars of peaches. He sees the woman waiting for him, peeking up from behind a truck in the street below. He yells at her to leave, to "take your war to more suitable companions." She steps out into the street, wearing the dress. He joins her, tosses one of the jars to her and says "Prekrasnyy". She smiles, and the two walk away together.

== Closing narration ==
This has been ... a love story, about two lonely people who found each other ... in the Twilight Zone.

== Music ==
An abbreviated version of the music for this episode, composed by Nathan Van Cleave, served as the basis for the opening and closing music for the radio drama CBS Radio Mystery Theater. The episode relies heavily on the music as there is very little dialogue throughout.

== Production notes ==
This episode was filmed on the backlot of Hal Roach Studios in Culver City, California, which was falling apart due to mismanagement and disuse (the facilities were finally torn down in 1963). Very little set decoration was needed to create the illusion of an abandoned city. The interior bracing that holds up the facade is visible through the second story windows in the opening shots of the episode and the credits.

The sound for the "blaster" was taken from Forbidden Planet, where Robby the Robot exclaims that an Earthman's weapon was "a simple blaster".
