= Will the Real Martian Please Stand Up? =

- The Twilight Zone episode
- Episode no.: Season 2 Episode 28
- Directed by: Montgomery Pittman
- Written by: Rod Serling
- Production code: 173-3660
- Original air date: May 26, 1961

Guest appearances
- John Hoyt as Ross, the businessman; Jean Willes as Ethel McConnell, the dancer; Jack Elam as Avery, the crazy man; Barney Phillips as Haley, the cook; John Archer as Trooper Bill Padgett; William Kendis as Olmstead, the bus driver; Morgan Jones as Trooper Dan Perry; Gertrude Flynn as Rose Kramer, the older wife; Bill Erwin as Peter Kramer, the older husband; Jill Ellis as Connie Prince, the younger wife; Ron Kipling as George Prince, the younger husband

Episode chronology
← Previous "The Mind and the Matter"	Next → "The Obsolete Man"
- The Twilight Zone (1959 TV series) (season 2)

"Will the Real Martian Please Stand Up?" is episode 64 of the American television anthology series The Twilight Zone. It originally aired on May 26, 1961, on CBS.

== Opening narration ==
Wintry February night, the present. Order of events: a phone call from a frightened woman notating the arrival of an unidentified flying object, then the checkout you've just witnessed, with two state troopers verifying the event – but with nothing more enlightening to add beyond evidence of some tracks leading across the highway to a diner. You've heard of trying to find a needle in a haystack? Well, stay with us now, and you'll be part of an investigating team whose mission is not to find that proverbial needle, no, their task is even harder. They've got to find a Martian in a diner, and in just a moment you'll search with them, because you've just landed – in The Twilight Zone.

== Plot ==
While investigating reports about a UFO, state troopers Dan Perry and Bill Padgett find evidence that something crashed in a frozen pond and its occupant fled to a nearby diner called the Hi-Way Café. Upon arriving, the troopers find a bus parked outside. Inside the diner, they find the cook Haley, bus driver Olmstead, and his passengers: dancer Ethel McConnell, outlandish old man Avery, businessman Ross, and two married couples.

The troopers announce a suspected alien may be among them and asks for everyone to identify themselves. After introducing himself, Olmstead states he was forced to stop at the diner due to the snowstorm outside. After learning the bridge ahead is closed, the troopers tell the passengers they may have to wait until morning pending an inspection by the county engineer. Olmstead states he counted six passengers on initial boarding, but the troopers point out seven in the diner. Haley claims the diner was empty before the bus arrived.

Following initial debate, Ethel suggests the couples should be cleared of suspicion as the spouses know each other. Both couples readily agree, but begin suspecting each other. When asked for her ID, Ethel claims it was sent ahead with her luggage. Despite this, Olmstead vouches for her, admitting he did notice her. As Avery jokes and Ross complains about not being able to make an important meeting, tensions rise after the jukebox flashes and the tabletop sugar dispensers explode. The troopers then receive a phone call telling them the bridge is safe to cross. Olmstead is concerned about its instability, but the troopers assuage his fears and everyone leaves after paying Haley.

Sometime later, Ross returns alone and explains the bridge collapsed, with no survivors other than himself. When Haley asks how Ross survived, the latter explains that everything that happened earlier, such as the jukebox and phone call, were illusions, and reveals himself as a three-armed alien scout sent ahead of his arriving fleet to ensure Earth is ready for Martian colonization. However, Haley reveals that he is a three-eyed alien scout from Venus and that his colonists have intercepted the Martian fleet.

== Closing narration ==
Incident on a small island, to be believed or disbelieved. However, if a sour-faced dandy named Ross or a big, good-natured counterman who handles a spatula as if he'd been born with one in his mouth, – if either of these two entities walk onto your premises, you'd better hold their hands – all three of them – or check the color of their eyes – all three of them. The gentlemen in question might try to pull you into - The Twilight Zone.

== See also ==
- List of The Twilight Zone (1959 TV series) episodes
