= Deaths-Head Revisited =

- The Twilight Zone episode
- Episode no.: Season 3 Episode 9
- Directed by: Don Medford
- Written by: Rod Serling
- Production code: 4804
- Original air date: November 10, 1961

Guest appearances
- Oscar Beregi, Jr.: Captain Lutze (Mr. Schmidt); Joseph Schildkraut: Alfred Becker; Karen Verne: Inn Keeper; Robert Boon: Taxi Driver; Ben Wright: The Doctor

Episode chronology
| ← Previous "It's a Good Life" | Next → "The Midnight Sun" |
- The Twilight Zone (1959 TV series) (season 3)

"Deaths-Head Revisited" is episode 74 of the American television anthology series The Twilight Zone. The story is about a former SS officer revisiting the Dachau concentration camp a decade and a half after World War II. The title is a play on the Evelyn Waugh novel Brideshead Revisited, and the SS "Death's Head" units who administered the camps. In Germany this episode was never brought to TV.

== Opening narration ==
Mr. Schmidt, recently arrived in a small Bavarian village which lies eight miles northwest of Munich... a picturesque, delightful little spot one-time known for its scenery, but more recently related to other events having to do with some of the less positive pursuits of man: human slaughter, torture, misery and anguish. Mr. Schmidt, as we will soon perceive, has a vested interest in the ruins of a concentration camp—for once, some seventeen years ago, his name was Gunther Lutze. He held the rank of a captain in the SS. He was a black-uniformed strutting animal whose function in life was to give pain, and like his colleagues of the time, he shared the one affliction most common amongst that breed known as Nazis... he walked the Earth without a heart. And now former SS Captain Lutze will revisit his old haunts, satisfied perhaps that all that is awaiting him in the ruins on the hill is an element of nostalgia. What he does not know, of course, is that a place like Dachau cannot exist only in Bavaria. By its nature, by its very nature, it must be one of the populated areas... of the Twilight Zone.

== Plot ==
In 1960, Gunther Lutze, a former SS captain, checks into a hotel in Dachau, Bavaria, under the name "Schmidt". The receptionist seems to recognize him, but he deflects suspicion by claiming to have served in the panzer division on the Eastern Front during World War II. He asks if a nearby camp is a prison. When the receptionist says it was used as a kind of prison, he presses her for a further explanation, though it soon becomes clear that he knows the exact purpose of the camp.

He goes to the site, the now-abandoned Dachau concentration camp, to recall his time as its commandant during the war. As he strolls around the camp, he revels in the memory of the torment he inflicted on the inmates. He is surprised to see Alfred Becker, one of the camp's former inmates and a particular victim of Lutze's cruelty, and equally surprised that Becker seems unchanged by the intervening 17 years.

Lutze supposes that Becker is now the caretaker of the camp, which Becker confirms "in a manner of speaking." As they talk, Becker relentlessly confronts Lutze with the reality of his grossly inhumane actions, while Lutze insists that he was only following orders. Lutze tries to dismiss Becker's description of cruelty by saying that the war is over and that he has moved on.

Lutze tries to leave, but finds the gate locked. Becker asks why he came back, given that he changed his name and fled to South America. Lutze argues that he hoped that with the passage of enough time, the world would have moved on and people would be willing to forget his "little mistakes of the past." Becker retorts that Lutze's actions were not mistakes, but crimes against humanity.

Becker and a dozen other ghostly inmates put Lutze on trial for his actions, which include ordering the deaths of over 1,700 innocent people without trial or due process, maiming and torturing thousands of human beings without provocation, the criminal experimentation on women and children, the murder of at least 14 people by his own hand, and calling and signing into effect orders for the gassing and cremating of one million human beings. Lutze screams and passes out.

Upon awaking, Lutze tells Becker he imagined the trial. Becker contradicts this, and informs Lutze of the guilty verdict. When Becker is about to pronounce the sentence to the court, Lutze mocks him as mad until he suddenly remembers that on the night American troops came close to Dachau 17 years before, he personally killed Becker and several other inmates and attempted to burn down the camp.

As punishment, Lutze is made to undergo the same horrors he imposed on the inmates in the form of tactile illusions, including being shot by machine guns at the gate, hanging by the gallows and torture at the detention building. He screams in agony from the illusions and collapses. Before departing, Becker's ghost informs him, "This is not hatred. This is retribution. This is not revenge. This is justice. But this is only the beginning, Captain. Only the beginning. Your final judgment will come from God."

Lutze is found by authorities, sedated by a doctor, and taken to a mental institution, since he continues to experience and react to his illusory sufferings. His finders wonder how a man who was perfectly calm two hours before could have gone insane so soon. The doctor then looks around and says, "Dachau. Why does it still stand? Why do we keep it standing?"

== Closing narration ==
There is an answer to the doctor's question. All the Dachaus must remain standing. The Dachaus, the Belsens, the Buchenwalds, the Auschwitzes; all of them. They must remain standing because they are a monument to a moment in time when some men decided to turn the Earth into a graveyard. Into it they shoveled all of their reason, their logic, their knowledge, but worst of all, their conscience. And the moment we forget this, the moment we cease to be haunted by its remembrance, then we become the gravediggers. Something to dwell on and to remember, not only in the Twilight Zone but wherever men walk God's Earth.

== Episode and cast notes ==
- Hungarian-born actor Oscar Beregi Jr (SS Captain Lutze), whose father was Jewish, had many screen roles as villains and 'heavies', and would have been familiar to American TV audiences of the time for his work in the popular TV detective series The Untouchables, where he had a recurring role as thuggish mobster Joe Kulak. This episode also marked Beregi's second appearance in The Twilight Zone—his first was as the leader of the criminal gang in the Season 2 episode "The Rip Van Winkle Caper".
- Alfred Becker, Lutze's supernatural adversary and judge, was played by distinguished Austrian-born character actor Joseph Schildkraut. He won the Academy Award for Best Supporting Actor for his performance as Captain Alfred Dreyfus in The Life of Emile Zola (1937), although he would have been best known to contemporary audiences for his role as the father Otto Frank in both the Broadway stage version and the 1959 film version of The Diary of Anne Frank.
- Kaaren Verne, who makes a brief appearance as the hotel receptionist in the episode's opening scene (credited as "Karen Verne"), had enjoyed a flourishing career in the Berlin State Theatre before she and her first husband were forced to flee Germany in 1938. She eventually settled in the US, where she soon became an outspoken opponent of the Nazi regime. In the mid-1940s, she was married for several years to renowned expatriate Hungarian-born Jewish actor Peter Lorre.
- Veteran British-born character actor Ben Wright (The Doctor) trained at RADA with Ida Lupino and worked on stage and screen in the UK before emigrating to the US in 1946. After becoming established in Hollywood, Wright's much-admired facility with accents and dialects saw him play a wide range of character parts in radio and on screen, portraying English, German, French, Australian, and even Chinese characters. He was also in "Judgment Night". Additionally, he played the Gauleiter of Austria Herr Zeller in The Sound of Music. He was also a noted voice actor, and performed featured voice parts in Disney's 101 Dalmatians and The Little Mermaid, which was his final screen credit before his death.
- In an archival audio interview, attached as a special feature to the episode in the Twilight Zone DVD boxed set, series producer Buck Houghton recalled that for this episode, the production was able to shoot the episode's exterior scenes in a large frontier fort set that had recently been built for the pilot for an unnamed Western TV series. Because that series had not been picked up by any of the networks, this very expensive set—which, according to Houghton, had cost US$200,000 (around US$1.6 million in 2016)—was then sitting abandoned on the MGM backlot, and only required minimal redressing to serve as the episode's setting, the Dachau concentration camp.
- Houghton recalled that episode director Don Medford was mainly known as an "action" director, but that he was chosen both for his ability to create effective "shock" moments, and for his willingness to allow emotional scenes to play out as long as he felt necessary. According to Houghton, Medford was also known for his meticulous preparation, although Houghton also recalled that Medford could become flustered if events during production (such as the unexpected unavailability of an actor) forced him to deviate from his production plans.
- Houghton also heaped praise on the work of British-born actor Ben Wright (who appears briefly as The Doctor at the end of the episode), noting that Wright had the ability to master any kind of accent or dialect convincingly, and this allowed him to play a wide range of nationalities during his long screen career.
- The story was later adapted for The Twilight Zone Radio Dramas starring H.M. Wynant in the Oscar Beregi role.

== Critical response ==
Gordon F. Sander, excerpt from Serling: The Rise and Twilight of Television's Last Angry Man:

Serling meted out nightmarish justice of a worse kind in "Deaths-Head Revisited" (directed by Don Medford), Serling's statement on the Holocaust, written in reaction to the then-ongoing Eichmann trial, in which a former Nazi, played by Oscar Beregi, on a nostalgic visit to Dachau, is haunted and ultimately driven insane by the ghosts of inmates he had killed there during the war.

== In popular culture ==
The introduction to the instrumental song "Intro to Reality" from the 1990 album Persistence of Time by the heavy metal band Anthrax featured dialogue spoken by the character Alfred Becker quoting, "We did as we were told." and "They just heard you offer the apology for all the monsters of our times." spoken to Lutze from this episode, followed by Lutze's line "Is that correct?" and his maniacal laughter repeating and fading out as the instrumentation begins. The instrumental segues into the next song, "Belly of The Beast" which is a tribute to the story itself from Becker's point of view.
