= Joe the Bartender =

Joe the Bartender may refer to:

== Fictional characters ==
=== Film ===
Listed chronologically

- A character played by B. S. Pully in the 1945 movie Nob Hill
- A character played by Lucien Prival in the 1952 movie High Noon
- A character played by Josip Elic in the 1989 movie Black Rain

=== Television ===
Listed alphabetically by actor's surname

- A character played by Steven W. Bailey in the television series Grey's Anatomy
- A character played by Jackie Gleason in several television series including The Jackie Gleason Show
- A character played by Dan Finnerty in the television series Rude Awakening
- A character played by Spike Lee in the television series She's Gotta Have It

== People ==
- Joe Gilmore (1922–2015), Irish/British bartender closely associated with the American Bar at the Savoy Hotel in London
