= A Game of Pool (The Twilight Zone, 1959) =

- The Twilight Zone episode
- Episode no.: Season 3 Episode 5
- Directed by: Buzz Kulik
- Written by: George Clayton Johnson
- Production code: 4815
- Original air date: October 13, 1961
- Running time: 25 minutes (without commercials)

Guest appearances
- Jack Klugman as Jesse Cardiff; Jonathan Winters as James Howard “Fats” Brown

Episode chronology
← Previous "The Passersby"	Next → "The Mirror"
- The Twilight Zone (1959 TV series) (season 3)

"A Game of Pool" is episode 70 of the American television anthology series The Twilight Zone. It originally aired on October 13, 1961, on CBS. According to Rod Serling, it is "the story of the best pool player living and the best pool player dead."

== Opening narration ==
Jesse Cardiff, pool shark, the best on Randolph Street, who will soon learn that trying to be the best at anything carries its own special risks, in or out of the Twilight Zone.

== Plot ==
Pool shark Jesse Cardiff stays after hours practicing at Lister's Pool Room in Chicago. He bitterly muses that he would be considered the greatest pool player of all time, if it were not for the memory of James Howard "Fats" Brown, who died sixteen years previously, overshadowing him.

Jesse says he would give anything to play one game against Fats, prompting Fats himself to wearily rise from a pool table in the afterlife. He appears in the pool room and offers to play 14.1 against Jesse, with a wager attached. If Jesse wins, he will be acknowledged as the greatest pool player ever; if he loses, he forfeits his life. Jesse accepts these conditions and the two begin to play.

As the game goes on, Jesse says that when he was young, he got tired of people looking down on him because they were good at things he could not do. He began to watch games at the pool hall as a teenager, and he began to pursue the sport in earnest after beating one of the locals in the first game he ever played. The owner has since let him practice after closing time, but in doing so, Jesse has forgone all other pleasures in life. Throughout the game, Fats laments that Jesse has done nothing with his life but play pool, explaining that he himself lived a full life in addition to becoming a great player. Jesse ignores Fats, convinced that he is just trying to distract him.

With one ball left on the table and both men needing to sink it in order to win, Fats misses his shot on purpose, and he warns Jesse that he may get more than he bargained for if he wins the game. Jesse sinks the ball and revels in his victory, now secure in his status as the best pool player of all time. Fats thanks Jesse for beating him and disappears, ignoring Jesse's accusation of being a sore loser.

Long after his own death, Jesse is summoned from the afterlife to travel to Mason's Pool Hall in Sandusky, Ohio, to play against a challenger. Known even in death as the greatest pool player ever, Jesse has no choice but to face an endless series of would-be successors until someone beats him and claims his title. Meanwhile, Fats has gone fishing, relieved of his obligation.

== Closing narration ==
Mr. Jesse Cardiff, who became a legend by beating one, but who has found out after his funeral that being the best of anything carries with it a special obligation to keep on proving it. Mr. Fats Brown, on the other hand, having relinquished the champion's mantle, has gone fishing. These are the ground rules in the Twilight Zone.

Rod Serling then appears on camera to promote the next episode:

We've had some performances of great depth on The Twilight Zone, and next week is no exception. A distinguished and incredibly talented young man lends us his services when Peter Falk stars in The Mirror. This is a story of a tyrant and his assassins, a shattered dream, and the death of a cause. Next week on The Twilight Zone, The Mirror.

== Remake with alternate ending ==
George Clayton Johnson's script originally featured an ending in which Jesse loses the game and yet finds himself still alive. Seeing this, Fats explains that he will die "as all second-raters die: you'll be buried and forgotten without me touching you. If you'd beaten me, you'd have lived forever." Fats disappears, while Jesse vows to keep practicing until he is good enough to face the champion again.

The episode was remade in the 1980s version of The Twilight Zone. The remade version featured Esai Morales as Jesse Cardiff and Maury Chaykin as Fats Brown. This version used the original ending that Johnson had intended for the original 1961 version.
