= The Passersby =

- The Twilight Zone episode
- Episode no.: Season 3 Episode 4
- Directed by: Elliot Silverstein
- Written by: Rod Serling
- Production code: 4817
- Original air date: October 6, 1961

Guest appearances
- James Gregory as The Sergeant; Joanne Linville as Lavinia Godwin; Warren J. Kemmerling as Jud Godwin; Rex Holman as Charlie Constable; David Garcia as Union Lieutenant; Austin Green as Abraham Lincoln

Episode chronology
← Previous "The Shelter"	Next → "A Game of Pool"
- The Twilight Zone (1959 TV series) season 3

"The Passersby" is the 69th episode of the American television anthology series The Twilight Zone. It was written by series creator and showrunner Rod Serling.

== Opening narration ==
As the episode starts, a group of Civil War soldiers are walking down a road as Rod Serling narrates:

This road is the afterwards of the Civil War. It began at Fort Sumter, South Carolina, and ended at a place called Appomattox. It's littered with the residue of broken battles and shattered dreams.

After the first dialogue between the Sergeant and Lavinia Godwin, Rod Serling resumes:

In just a moment, you will enter a strange province that knows neither North nor South, a place we call—The Twilight Zone.

== Plot ==
At the end of the Civil War, a Confederate Army Sergeant walks down a road aided by a wooden crutch. He carries with him a dirty bed roll and a homemade guitar. The limping Sergeant comes across a ruined antebellum mansion that belongs to Lavinia Godwin, a Southern belle whose husband was killed in the war and whose bitterness toward the Union Army still persists.

The Sergeant receives permission from Lavinia to sit on a bench under a dead tree in her front yard. He plays his guitar, and Lavinia recognizes the tune as one that her husband used to sing. The two watch as soldiers belonging to both the Union and the Confederacy pass by the house and continue down the road. The Sergeant learns about Lavinia's illness and her husband's death.

As they reminisce, a Union Lieutenant on horseback stops by the home to ask for water. The Sergeant recognizes him as the man that saved his life in the war. Meanwhile, Lavinia retrieves an old shotgun and fires at the Lieutenant. The blast passes through him and he remarks that nothing matters anymore. The Sergeant then remembers that the man who saved his life was killed. He gives the Lieutenant a drink from the well and the soldier continues on his way.

The night passes and the Sergeant begins to understand that this is not a normal road and these are not ordinary wounded soldiers. He tells Lavinia that there is something at the end of the road he has to find. As the Sergeant turns to leave, Lavinia tries to persuade him to stay. They then hear a man's voice singing the same song the Sergeant had played earlier on his guitar − it is Lavinia's husband, Jud.

Jud reveals to Lavinia that everyone on the road is indeed dead, including her. The Sergeant, understanding Jud's words, sighs and begins to walk down the road, but Lavinia refuses to believe. Jud tells her that there is nothing left for him in that house. Jud rejects her pleas and continues his journey, reassuring her that he will wait for her at the end of the road.

Lavinia is then comforted by a lone passerby, who turns out to be Abraham Lincoln, the last casualty of the Civil War. Lincoln quotes a line from Shakespeare's Julius Caesar, before Lavinia runs to join her husband:

Of all the wonders that I yet have heard,
It seems to me most strange that men should fear,
Seeing that death, a necessary end,
Will come when it will come.

Julius Caesar, Act 5, Scene 2, 4–8

== Closing narration ==
Incident on a dirt road during the month of April, the year 1865. As we've already pointed out, it's a road that won't be found on a map, but it's one of many that lead in and out of the Twilight Zone.

== Cast ==
- James Gregory as The Sergeant
- Joanne Linville as Lavinia Godwin
- Warren Kemmerling as Jud Godwin
- Rex Holman as Charlie Constable
- David Garcia as Union Lieutenant
- Austin Green as Abraham Lincoln
- Jamie Farr as Soldier (uncredited)

== Episode notes ==
The traditional folk song "Black Is the Color (Of My True Love's Hair)" is featured prominently throughout this episode.

Elements of the episode are re-made in an episode of the 2002 revival named, "Homecoming". In the episode a dead soldier returns from Iraq to repair his relationship with his son.

The radio adaptation of this episode starred Morgan Brittany as Lavinia.

== Bibliography ==
- DeVoe, Bill. (2008). Trivia from The Twilight Zone. Albany, GA: Bear Manor Media. ISBN 978-1-59393-136-0
- Grams, Martin. (2008). The Twilight Zone: Unlocking the Door to a Television Classic. Churchville, MD: OTR Publishing. ISBN 978-0-9703310-9-0
