= William Kendis =

American television actor (1916–1980)

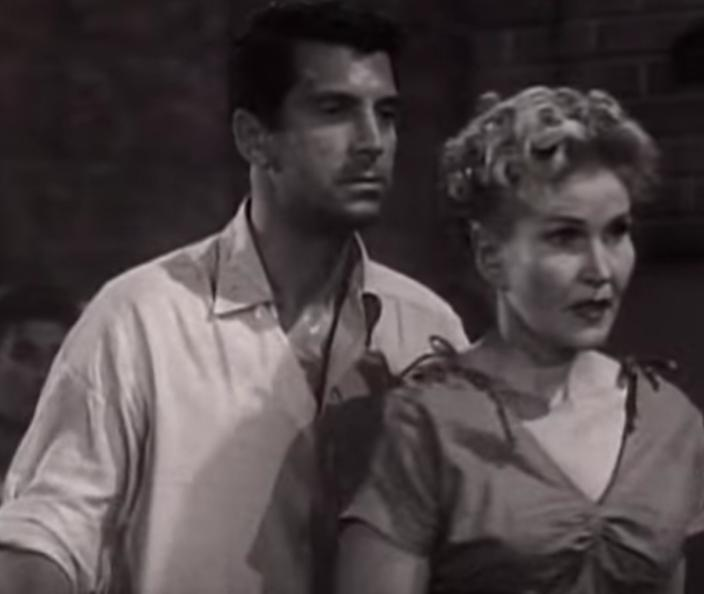
- Kendis (left) with Eve McVeagh in Man with a Camera, 1958
- Born: William Kaleviano; May 27, 1916; New Hampshire, U.S.
- Died: December 17, 1980 (aged 64); Los Angeles, California, U.S.
- Occupation: Television actor
- Years active: 1955–1967

William Kaleviano (May 27, 1916 – December 17, 1980) was an American television actor. He was known for playing the recurring role of Emmett Hughes in the American private detective television series Michael Shayne and was also known for playing Olmstead, the bus driver in the episode "Will the Real Martian Please Stand Up?" of the American anthology television series The Twilight Zone.

Kendis guest-starred in numerous television programs including Gunsmoke (as Carey Post), Perry Mason (as murder victim Walter Prescott), Colgate Theatre, The Rifleman, The Adventures of Rin-Tin-Tin, Decision, Bewitched, The Detectives, 77 Sunset Strip, Bachelor Father, Family Affair, The Flying Nun, Leave it to Beaver and Peter Gunn.

Kendis died on December 17, 1980, in Los Angeles, California, at the age of 64.
