= Still Valley =

- The Twilight Zone episode
- Episode no.: Season 3 Episode 11
- Directed by: James Sheldon
- Teleplay by: Rod Serling
- Based on: "The Valley Was Still" by Manly Wade Wellman
- Production code: 4808
- Original air date: November 24, 1961

Guest appearances
- Gary Merrill; Vaughn Taylor; Ben Cooper; Mark Tapscott; Jack Mann

Episode chronology
← Previous "The Midnight Sun"	Next → "The Jungle"
- The Twilight Zone (1959 TV series) (season 3)

"Still Valley" is episode 76 of the American television anthology series The Twilight Zone.

== Opening narration ==
The time is 1863, the place the state of Virginia. The event is a mass blood-letting known as the Civil War, a tragic moment in time when a nation was split into two fragments, each fragment deeming itself a nation.

The narration continues after dialogue between Paradine and Dauger.

This is Joseph Paradine, Confederate cavalry, as he heads down toward a small town in the middle of a valley. But very shortly, Joseph Paradine will make contact with the enemy. He will also make contact with an outpost not found on a military map—an outpost called the Twilight Zone.

== Plot ==
During the Civil War, two Confederate Army soldiers have been assigned to scout the Union Army troops that are advancing into the valley below. Sergeant Joseph Paradine hears the troops approaching, but suddenly the sound stops. He decides to descend into the valley to see the cause for himself. His companion refuses to accompany him.

When Paradine gets into town, he finds the troops there, but all of them are motionless, frozen in time. He tries unsuccessfully to wake them. Finally he comes across an old man named Teague, the sole remaining inhabitant of the town, who is unaffected by the strange phenomenon. Teague claims to be a "witch-man" and says he used a magic spell to freeze the soldiers. Paradine does not believe him, so Teague casts the spell on Paradine, freezing him.

When Teague lifts the spell on Paradine, he claims that he could stop the entire Union Army in this manner, ensuring the success of the Confederacy. Paradine asks why he has not done so, and Teague replies that he is dying and will be dead by the day's end. He gives his book of spells to Paradine, encouraging him to use it, but when Paradine looks in it, he realizes that using this magic would require him to align himself with Satan, which Teague acknowledges.

Teague dies, and Paradine returns to camp to tell his superior about what happened. The superior does not believe him and orders him to get some rest. When another scout returns to report that an entire company of Union troops is standing frozen near the camp, Paradine reveals that he cast a spell on them from the book. Once he describes his encounter with the old man, his superior urges him to continue reading from the book since Satan may be the only ally who can help the Confederacy win the war.

Paradine discovers that using the book's magic requires that not only must he praise the name of the Devil, but he must renounce the name of God. Rather than do either, Paradine throws the book into a campfire, saying that if the Confederacy is to die, it should be buried in hallowed ground. The next day, Paradine receives orders that his unit is going to march to Gettysburg.

== Closing narration ==
On the following morning, Sergeant Paradine and the rest of these men were moved up north to a little town in Pennsylvania, an obscure little place where a battle was brewing, a town called Gettysburg, and this one was fought without the help of the Devil. Small historical note not to be found in any known books, but part of the records in the Twilight Zone.

== Cast ==
- Gary Merrill as Sergeant Joseph Paradine
- Vaughn Taylor as Teague
- Ben Cooper as Dauger
- Mark Tapscott as Lieutenant
- Jack Mannas as Mallory

== Episode notes ==
- The episode is based on a 1939 short story, "The Valley Was Still" by Manly Wade Wellman.
- In the original story, Paradine kills Teague when he finds that to make the spell book work, he must sign his name in blood (making a contract with the Devil); later, when the spell on the soldiers is broken when the book is burned, both Union and Confederates have a big battle in the valley.
