= Joseph Bernard (actor) =

American actor (1923–2006)

- Born: Joseph Fieldman; December 12, 1923; Brooklyn, New York, U.S.
- Died: April 3, 2006 (aged 82); New York City, U.S.
- Occupations: Actor; director; acting teacher
- Years active: 1951–1995
- Spouse: Bina Rosenbaum (1952–2001; her death)
- Children: 2
- Relatives: Molly Bernard (granddaughter) [Bella Bernard] ( daughter)

Joseph Bernard (born Fieldman; December 12, 1923 – April 3, 2006) was an American actor and acting teacher who appeared in 25 Broadway plays and several movies and TV appearances in the 1950s through 1970s.

Bernard was born in Brooklyn, New York, the son of Ashkenazi Jewish immigrants Bernard Fieldman, a suitcase maker, and Lenya Kaplan, from Pinsk.

He studied at New York's New School for Social Research with acting teacher Stella Adler. One of his New School classmates was Marlon Brando.

Bernard was drafted into the U.S. Army and served in the D-Day invasion of France. After the war, he appeared in the play Winter Soldiers and then Skipper Next to God, directed by Lee Strasberg and starring John Garfield, with whom he became friends. Garfield was Bernard's best man at his marriage to his wife, Bina, whom he wed in 1952. Bina died in 2001.

Bernard appeared in Murder, Inc., the Stanley Kramer film Judgment at Nuremberg (1961), in which he played an assistant to the American prosecutor, played by Richard Widmark, and a number of other films that included Ice Station Zebra. His television roles included appearances on Star Trek, The Twilight Zone (in the 1961 episode The Shelter), and Mission: Impossible.

In 1968, he became an executive director and teacher at the Lee Strasberg Theater Institute in Hollywood. He moved to Las Vegas in 1979 and established the Joseph Bernard Acting Studio.

In addition to directing episodes of The Flying Nun TV series, Joseph wrote both stage plays and screenplays. His original theater production Take Off Your Clothes, I'll Make You A Star, based on his experiences as an acting teacher, had runs in both Los Angeles and Las Vegas. Bernard and his son, writer/producer Sam Bernard, collaborated on the screenplay for the feature film Payback (1995) for Trimark Pictures.

== Filmography ==
Year	Title	Role	Notes
1960	Murder, Inc.	Mendy Weiss	
1961	Judgment at Nuremberg	Maj. Abe Radnitz	
1968	Don't Just Stand There	Police Inspector	
1968	Ice Station Zebra	Dr. Jack Benning	
1970	R. P. M.	4th Professor at dining table	Uncredited
1971	The Steagle	Max Levine	
1971	Brute Corps	Sheriff Alvarez	
1972	Stand Up and Be Counted	Executive	Uncredited
1973	The Baby	Mr. Foley	
1973	The Laughing Policeman	Avakian's Brother	
1974	Hangup	Proprietor	
1983	The Man Who Loved Women	Dr. Simon Abrams	
1985	Fever Pitch	Bernstein	
1986	Heat	Pit Boss	
1992	Mikey	Dr. Schaefer	
1993	Warlock: The Armageddon	Sutherland	
