= Fred Howard Wright =

American actor and songwriter (1896–1990)

- Born: Frederick Howard Wright; September 30, 1896; San Diego, California, U.S.
- Died: July 2, 1990 (aged 93); California, U.S.
- Resting place: Los Angeles National Cemetery
- Education: University of California, San Diego
- Occupations: Actor, songwriter
- Years active: 1923–1977
- Spouse(s): Jean—or Laura—Henley (m. 1919; div. ?); Sylvia Jane Worley (m. 1925; div. ?); Theofani Arminda Papadakis (m. 1930; d. 1963); Helen Louise Davis (m. 1969; d. 1985)
- Children: 2
- Military career
- Branch: United States Army
- Service years: 1917–1920
- Rank: Second Lieutenant
- Unit: 1st Cavalry Regiment
- Conflicts: Pancho Villa Expedition

Frederick Howard Wright (September 30, 1896 – July 2, 1990), credited variously as Fred Howard (for his writing, and for all stage and radio performances), Howard Wright (for his later film and TV work), and, more recently still, Fred Howard Wright, was an American songwriter, vaudeville performer, and character actor of theatre, radio, film and television, best remembered as one half—along with fellow songwriter Nat Vincent—of the popular vaudeville, radio, recording, and songwriting duo, The Happy Chappies.

== Early life and career ==
Born Frederick Howard Wright in San Diego, California on September 30, 1896, Wright was the middle child of five, born to Lucy Simonds (née Wheeler) and William Sherman Wright. He first performed in public at age 9, when, as a reward for having sold the most tickets to a high school operetta, he was tasked not merely with formally presenting the frieze purchased by proceeds from the production, but also asked to sing at the ceremony. After attending the University of California, San Diego, Wright joined the US Army, serving in 1st Cavalry Regiment, with whom he took part in the unsuccessful Pancho Villa Expedition. Eventually rising to the rank of Second Lieutenant, Wright received his discharge in 1920.

Over the next decade, Wright—as Fred Howard—established himself as a successful stage performer, writer, producer, and director, specializing in musical comedy. His singing was showcased in the trio, Harmony Three.

By February 1929, Wright—who, as a solo act, had previously appeared in at least one revue also featuring his soon-to-be partner's recently formed duo—had officially become one half of the Happy Chappies, replacing pianist Nat Vincent's previous partner, tenor Harry Morton, while also facilitating Wright's radio debut on San Francisco's KFRC. They continued together—having reportedly co-authored "486 popular songs" as of December 1935—at least as late as the summer of 1937.

In April 1938, Wright appeared at New York's Waldorf Astoria Hotel, in the Lambs Club's annual Spring Gambol, co-starring with Walter Woolf King and Gene Wolf in the brief operetta, Tempest in a Teapot, with words and music by Wright.

As a radio actor, some of Wright's more notable roles were C. Pemberton Tooley in Ma Perkins, Mr. Pringle—father of Oogie—in A Date with Judy, and Pa Buskirk on The Opie Cates Show

From 1949 through 1952, Wright was the principal writer on The Ruggles, the Charlie Ruggles sitcom created by Irving Phillips.

=== From Fred Howard to Howard Wright ===
In March 1949, Wright—still billed as "Fred Howard"—made his TV debut, starring alongside K. T. Stevens, Marc Lawrence, in the Don Lee Television Workshop episode, "Shoes and Souls". One additional "Fred Howard" credit, for a 1951 appearance on Racket Squad, preceded the actor's unnoticed—and, accordingly, never explained—1953 professional transition to "Howard Wright" (Note: While it is certainly Wright's relative obscurity, rather than any lack of candor on his part, that ensured the ongoing mystery regarding what prompted this decision, it is perhaps relevant to note that, beginning in the spring of 1951, there was a considerable amount of nationwide publicity regarding an altogether different—and reportedly 'Oscar'-winning—Fred Howard, that being the prize-winning rose, itself named after the famous, like-named rose breeder who had first brought it into existence.) on The Adventures of Wild Bill Hickok.

Among Wright's more notable television credits are two The Twilight Zone episodes, as "Judge Hardy" in the Season Three episode, "The Jungle (The Twilight Zone)" and an unnamed judge in the previous season's What's in the Box. He also appeared on numerous episodes of the westerns, Bonanza and Death Valley Days.

In his rave review of the 1956 Barry Shipman/William Witney western drama, Stranger at My Door, Variety's William Brogdon—as "Brog"—made a point of assigning every bit as much credit to the film's principal supporting players as to the stars.

The above mentioned players earn plaudits for characters compellingly performed and right along with them are Louis Jean Heydt, as the sheriff, Howard Wright, a doctor, Slim Pickens, horse trader and millwright, and Malcolm Atterbury, a circuit rider.

== Personal life and death ==
In 1919 or 1920, Wright became the husband of Jean—elsewhere identified as Laura—Henley, with whom he had one child, a daughter, Jo Ann. Wright was married to actress Sylvia Jane Worley from January 1925 until at least March 1927—when they sailed together from San Francisco to Honolulu—and no later than October 1930, when Greek-born Theofani Arminda Pappadakis became the next Mrs. Wright, as she would remain until her death on March 4, 1963. Their union produced one child, a daughter, Patsy Zo. In 1969, Wright once again was wed, this time to Helen Louise Daves (née Young); she died in 1985.

Wright died on July 2, 1990, at age 93. His remains are interred at the Los Angeles National Cemetery.

== Selected filmography ==
=== Films ===
==== Soundtrack ====
- The Fiddlin' Buckaroo (1933) – writer: "My Pretty Quadroon"
- Round-Up Time in Texas (1937) – writer: "When the Bloom Is on the Sage"
- Jezebel (1938) – writer: "My Pretty Quadroon"
- Western Jamboree (1938) – writer: "When the Bloom Is on the Sage"
- Loaded Pistols (1948) – writer: "When the Bloom Is on the Sage"
- Under Mexicali Stars (1950) – writer: "Old Black Mountain Trail"
- Rodeo King and the Senorita (1951) – writer: "The Strawberry Roan"
- A Prairie Home Companion (2006) – writer: "When the Bloom Is on the Sage"

==== Acting ====
All performances credited as "Howard Wright" unless otherwise indicated.

- Six Bridges to Cross (1955) – Judge
- Cell 2455, Death Row (1955) – Judge
- One Desire (1955) – Judge Congin
- Headline Hunters (1955) – Harry Bradley
- Seminole Uprising (1955) – Col. Hannah
- The Gun That Won the West (1955) – Gen. John Pope
- A Day of Fury (1956) – Mayor Alston
- Cha-Cha-Cha Boom! (1956) – Harry Teasdale
- Stranger at My Door (1956) – Doc Parks
- The Spider (1958) – Jake
- War of the Colossal Beast (1958) – Medical corps officer
- The Bonnie Parker Story (1958) – Old man
- The Legend of Tom Dooley (1959) – Sheriff Joe Dobbs
- Young Jesse James (1960) – Mr. Jenkins
- Five Minutes to Live (1960) – Pop (as Fred Howard)
- The Louisiana Hussy (1960) – Cob
- The Chase (1966) – Theodore Crain (uncredited)
- Good Times (1967) – Old timer
- Whatever Happened to Aunt Alice (1969) – Mourner
- The Legend of Earl Durand (1974) – Mr. Clark

=== Television ===
==== Soundtrack ====
- The Gene Autry Show
  - Season 1 Episode 6 "The Double Switch" (1950) – writer: "When the Bloom Is on the Sage" (uncredited)
  - Season 1 Episode 12 "The Poisoned Waterhole" (1950) – writer: "Mellow Mountain Moon" (uncredited)
  - Season 1 Episode 19 "Hot Lead" (1950) – writer: "The Strawberry Roan" (uncredited)
  - Season 4 Episode 10 "Outlaw of Blue Mesa" (1954) – writer: "When the Bloom Is on the Sage" (uncredited)
  - Season 5 Episode 2 "Stage to San Dimas" (1955) – writer: "Mellow Mountain Moon" (uncredited)
  - Season 5 Episode 8 "Go West, Young Lady" (1955) – writer: "When the Bloom Is on the Sage" (uncredited)
- The Muppet Show (1979)
  - Season 4 Episode 9 "Beverly Sills" – writer: "When the Bloom Is on the Sage"

==== Acting ====
All performances credited as "Howard Wright" unless otherwise indicated.

- Don Lee Television Workshop (1949)
  - "Shoes and Souls" – Unknown role (as Fred Howard)
- Racket Squad
  - "The Case of the Not-So-Old Masters" (1951) – Unknown role (as Fred Howard)
- The Adventures of Wild Bill Hickok
  - "Wagon Wheel Trail" (1953) – Sam Varney
- I Led Three Lives (1954)
  - Season 1 Episode 38 "Unexpected Trip" – Wyman
- Stories of the Century
  - Season 1 Episode 25 "Ben Thompson" (1954) – Murdered passenger
  - Season 2 Episode 1 "Burt Alvord" (1955) – Sheriff Alvord
- Death Valley Days
  - Season 3 Episode 3 "Halfway Girl" (1954) – Joe McLean
  - Season 7 Episode 12 "Old Gabe" (1958) – J. Groves
  - Season 7 Episode 22 "Price of a Passport" (1959) – Sylvester Pattie
  - Season 11 Episode 12 "The Private Mint of Clark, Gruber and Co." (1962) – Judge
  - Season 14 Episode 24 "The Four Dollar Suit" (1966) – Judge
  - Season 14 Episode 26 "Lady of the Plains" (1966) – Henry Otis
- Celebrity Playhouse (1956)
  - Season 1 Episode 31 "No Escape" – Mr. Karnes
- Ford Television Theatre (1956)
  - Season 4 Episode 34 "Sheila" – Mr. Kerrigan
- Annie Oakley (1956)
  - "The Robin Hood Kid" – Martin Owen
- The Joseph Cotten Show – On Trial (1956)
  - Season 1 Episode 3 "The Nevada Nightingale" – Al Wilson
- The Adventures of Dr. Fu Manchu (1956)
  - Season 1 Episode 10 "The Counterfeiters of Dr. Fu Manchu" – Walter Stafford
- Hey, Jeannie! (1957)
  - Season 1 Episode 19 "The Business Girl" – Lt. Gen. Jordan
  - Season 1 Episode 22 "Jeannie the WAC" – Lynch
- The Web (1957)
  - Season 1 Episode 4 "Hurricane Coming" – Mr. Karnes (Note: "Hurricane Coming" appears to be simply an unacknowledged and retitled rebroadcast of the previous year's "No Escape," the 31st episode of Celebrity Playhouse, which, according to TV historian Vincent Terrace, was itself a series composed entirely of repeats of Schlitz Playhouse of the Stars episodes.)
- The Twilight Zone
  - Season 3 Episode 12 "The Jungle" (1961) – Hardy
  - Season 5 Episode 24 "What's in the Box" (1964) – Judge
- Bonanza
  - Season 3 Episode 5 – "The Burma Rarity" (1961) – Insurance man
  - Season 3 Episode 20 – "The Auld Sod" (1962) – Howie
  - Season 4 Episode 21 – "The Hayburner" (1964) – Sam Finney
  - Season 6 Episode 21 – "The Search" (1965) – Abe Jenkins
  - Season 7 Episode 8 – "The Meredith Smith" (1965) – Cal
  - Season 8 Episode 11 – "The Oath" (1966) – Sam
