= Oscar Beregi (actor, born 1918) =

American actor (1918–1976)

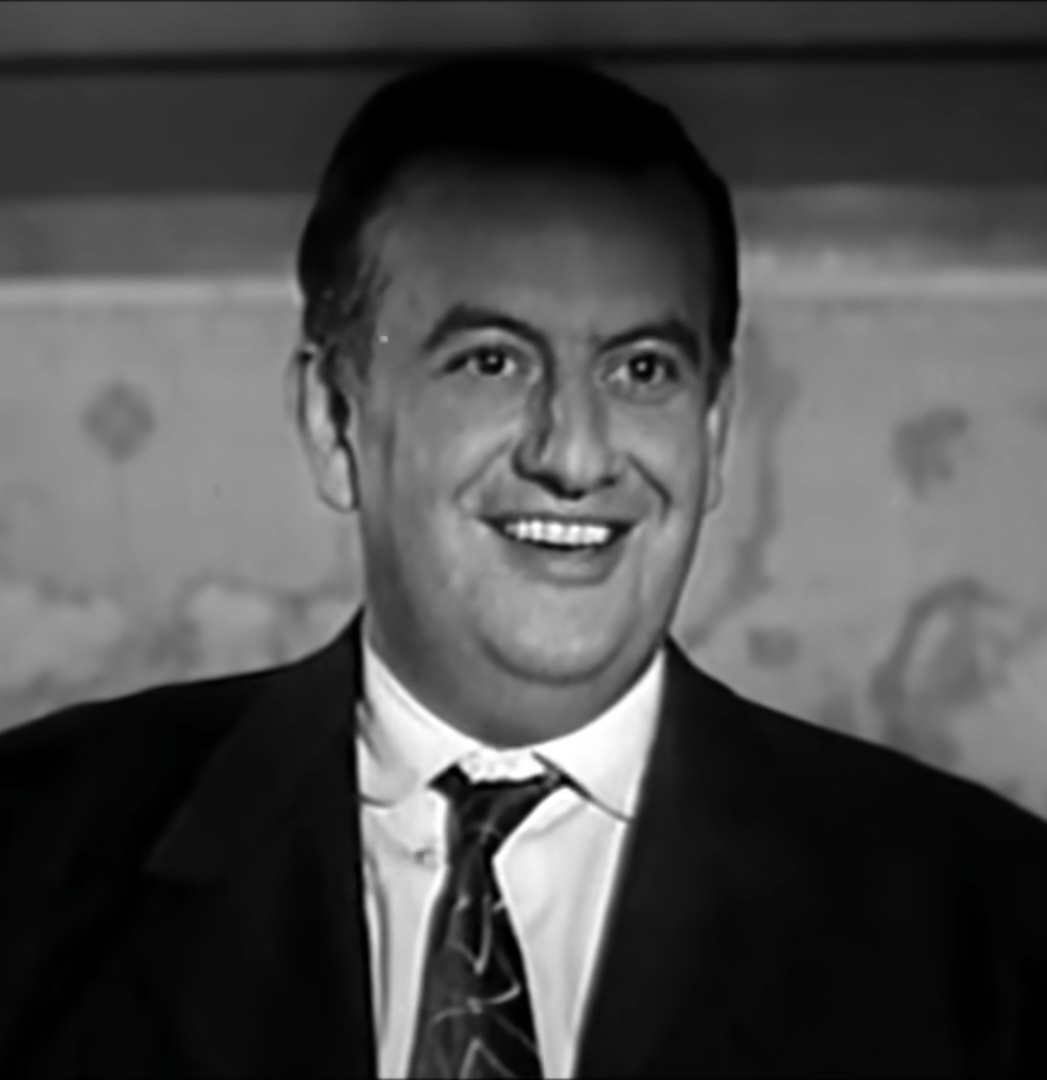
- Beregi in the TV series One Step Beyond, episode Message from Clara, 1959
- Born: May 12, 1918; Budapest, Austria-Hungary (now Hungary)
- Died: November 1, 1976 (aged 58); Los Angeles, California, U.S.
- Resting place: Grand View Memorial Park
- Occupation: Actor
- Years active: 1959–1976
- Parent(s): Oscar Beregi Sr. (father); Amália Adler (mother)

Oscar Beregi (May 12, 1918 – November 1, 1976) was a Hungarian-American film and television actor. He was the son of actor Oscar Beregi Sr., and often was sometimes billed as Oscar Beregi Jr..

== Early life ==
Beregi was born in Budapest, then a part of the Austro-Hungarian Empire, in 1918. His father, Oscar Beregi, was an actor and matinee idol of Hungarian-Jewish origin. The Beregi family moved to Vienna in the early 1920s, after the dissolution of the Empire, due to the elder Oscar's political activities. Both left Europe in 1939 to escape the Nazi takeover, the elder Beregi moved to the United States and the son settled in Chile, where he ran a restaurant. It took several years for the younger Beregi to be granted a visa to enter the U.S., and then only through the intervention of then-U.S. Senator Lyndon B. Johnson.

== Career ==
=== Television ===
Making his acting debut at the age of 40, Beregi had a major recurring role as gangster Joe Kulak on The Untouchables. He played the starring role as former Nazi Gunther Lutze in the Twilight Zone episode "Deaths-Head Revisited." He also appeared in the Twilight Zone episodes "The Rip Van Winkle Caper" and "Mute". He also appeared in other television shows, including Hogan's Heroes (twice), The Monkees, The Man From U.N.C.L.E., Blue Light, Don't Call Me Charlie!, The Wild Wild West, Mission: Impossible, Get Smart, Green Acres, and in an episode of The Lucy Show which featured Hogan's Heroes stars Bob Crane and John Banner. He appeared in the Gomer Pyle, U.S.M.C. episode “Love and Goulash”, which aired on March 29, 1968.

=== Film ===
Beregi's film career included small roles in several major films, including Judgment at Nuremberg (1961), The Incredible Mr. Limpet (1964), My Fair Lady (1964), Ship of Fools (1965), Everything You Always Wanted to Know About Sex* (*But Were Afraid to Ask) (1972) and Young Frankenstein (1974).

== Death ==
Beregi died of a heart attack on November 1, 1976, aged 58, in Los Angeles, California. He is buried in the Grand View Memorial Park Cemetery in Glendale.

== Filmography ==
Year	Title	Role	Notes
1959	Alfred Hitchcock Presents	Man Arguing at Telescope	Season 5 Episode 2: "The Crystal Trench" (uncredited)
1959	The Oregon Trail	Ralph Clayman	Uncredited
1960	Let's Make Love	Chauffeur	Uncredited
1960	North to Alaska	Captain	Uncredited
1960	Sea Hunt	Rebreather	1 episode
1961	Operation Eichmann	Chief of Police, Kuwait	
1961	The Fiercest Heart	Klaas	
1961	The Twilight Zone	Mr. Farwell	The Rip Van Winkle Caper S2 E24
1961	The Twilight Zone	Gunther Lutze	Deaths-Head Revisited S3 E9
1961	Judgment at Nuremberg	Waiter at Court Lounge	Uncredited
1961	Police Nurse	Dr. Leon Claudel	
1963	Decision at Midnight	Chief Marshal	
1963	Combat!	Major Schiller, Doctor	Oscar Beregi
1963	The Twilight Zone	Professor Karl Werner	Mute S3 E5
1964	The Incredible Mr. Limpet	Nazi Admiral	
1964	My Fair Lady	Greek Ambassador	Uncredited
1964	Youngblood Hawke	Builder	Uncredited
1964	36 Hours	Lieutenant Colonel Ostermann	
1965	Ship of Fools	Herr Lutz	
1965	Morituri	Admiral Wendel	
1966	The Monkees	Count Myron	S1:E21, "The Prince and the Paupers"
1967	Batman (TV Series)	Dr. Floyd	Season 2 Episode 48
1967	The Scorpio Letters	Philippe Soriel	
1968	Panic in the City	Dr. Paul Cerbo	
1970	The Christine Jorgensen Story	Dr. Victor Dahlman	
1970	The Great White Hope	Ragosy	
1971	The Organization	Andre / Drug Lord	Uncredited
1971	Cactus in the Snow	Mr. Albert	
1972	Everything You Always Wanted to Know About Sex	Brain Control	
1974	Young Frankenstein	Sadistic Jailor	
