= Joanne Linville =

American actress and acting teacher (1928–2021)

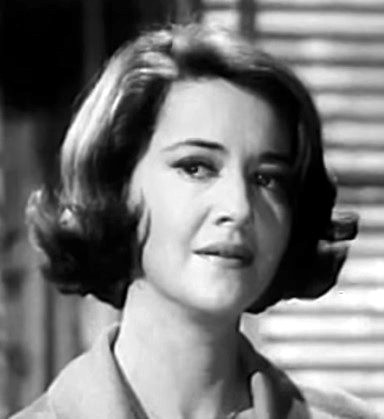
- Linville in 1960
- Born: January 15, 1928; Bakersfield, California, U.S.
- Died: June 20, 2021 (aged 93); Los Angeles, California, U.S.
- Occupation: Actress
- Years active: 1950–2005, 2016
- Known for: The Enterprise Incident; The Passersby
- Spouse: Mark Rydell (m. 1962; div. 1973)
- Children: 2

Joanne Linville (January 15, 1928 – June 20, 2021) was an American actress. She later taught at the Stella Adler Academy of Acting and Theatre in Los Angeles.

== Early life ==
Linville was born in Bakersfield, California, on January 15, 1928. She attended high school in Long Beach, California, and worked as an oral surgeon's assistant before studying acting. While she studied with Stella Adler, she danced professionally to pay her tuition.

== Career ==
=== Acting ===
Linville's motion-picture credits include The Goddess (1958), Scorpio (1973), Gable and Lombard (1976), A Star Is Born (1976), The Seduction (1982), and James Dean (2001).

In 1959, Linville appeared on the CBS daytime drama The Guiding Light as Amy Sinclair, a runaway drug addict whose daughter was nearly taken from her as part of an illegal adoption scam ring. Linville starred in two television presentations of One Step Beyond— as Aunt Mina in the episode "The Dead Part of the House" (1959) and as Karen Wadsworth in the episode "A Moment of Hate" (1960).

In 1961, she starred in the Twilight Zone episode "The Passersby". Also in 1961, she was in the second episode of The Defenders with William Shatner.

In 1968, Linville guest-starred as an unnamed Romulan commander (retroactively named Liviana Charvanek in printed materials) in Star Trek episode "The Enterprise Incident". This role earned Linville cult status and remains her best-known performance.

Linville's other television appearances include Decoy (in the premiere episode), Alfred Hitchcock Presents, Have Gun Will Travel, Coronado 9, Checkmate, Adventures in Paradise, Empire, Gunsmoke (three episodes), Dr. Kildare, Ben Casey, Route 66, The Eleventh Hour, I Spy, Bonanza, The Fugitive, The F.B.I. (two episodes), The Invaders (two episodes), Felony Squad, Hawaii Five-O (three episodes), Kojak, Columbo: Candidate for Crime, The Streets of San Francisco (two episodes), Barnaby Jones, Switch, Charlie's Angels, CHiPs, Mrs. Columbo, Dynasty, and L.A. Law.

Linville appeared in the made-for-TV movies House on Greenapple Road (and the resulting series Dan August) (1970), Secrets (1977), The Critical List (1978), The Users (1978), and The Right of the People (1986). Linville played the mother of Janine Turner's character in Behind the Screen. Linville and George Grizzard starred in "I Kiss Your Shadow", the final episode of the television series Bus Stop.

Linville portrayed Valeria in the Broadway production Daughter of Silence (1961). Linville played gossip columnist Hedda Hopper in the television movie James Dean (2001), directed by her former husband Mark Rydell, who also played Jack L. Warner.

=== Writing and teaching ===
Linville retired from acting in the 1980s to concentrate on teaching. She taught "The Power of Language" course at the Stella Adler Academy of Acting and Theatre in Los Angeles in 1985. One of her students was Mark Ruffalo, who wrote that she "does not theorise about great acting. She is great acting".

== Personal life ==
Linville was married to actor/director Mark Rydell from 1962 until their divorce in 1973. Linville had two children with Rydell: Amy and Christopher Rydell, both actors. Her daughter Amy Rydell reprised her mother's role as Romulan commander Charvanek on episodes 10 and 11 of fan production Star Trek Continues.

Linville was also an amateur tennis player, and appeared at charity events where people were invited to pay $100 to challenge her in a game.

Linville died on June 20, 2021 in Los Angeles, aged 93.

== Filmography ==
=== Film ===
| Year | Title | Role | Notes |
|---|---|---|---|
| 1950 | Copper Canyon | Showgirl | Uncredited |
| 1958 | The Goddess | Joanna | |
| 1973 | Scorpio | Sarah Cross | |
| 1976 | Gable and Lombard | Ria Gable | |
| 1976 | A Star Is Born | Freddie | |
| 1982 | The Seduction | Dr. Weston | |
| 2005 | Beyond Lovely | Voice over | Short film |

=== Television ===
Television
| Year | Title | Role | Notes |
|---|---|---|---|
| 1954–58 | Studio One | Various roles | 6 episodes |
| 1956 | The Kaiser Aluminum Hour | Gwyneth | Episode: "Gwyneth" |
| 1957 | The Alcoa Hour | Daisy Sage | Episode: "The Animal Kingdom" |
| 1957 | Decoy | Molly Orchid | Episode: "Stranglehold" |
| 1957 | Robert Montgomery Presents | —N/a | Episode: "Return Visit" |
| 1958 | Alfred Hitchcock Presents | Millie Manners | Season 3 Episode 36: "The Safe Place" |
| 1958 | Kraft Television Theatre | Pat Colson | Episode: "Killer's Choice" |
| 1958 | The United States Steel Hour | Martha Purvis | Episode: "Old Marshals Never Die" |
| 1958 | Suspicion | Lois | Episode: "Someone Is After Me" |
| 1959 | Guiding Light | Amy Sinclair | |
| 1959 | The Further Adventures of Ellery Queen | —N/a | Episode: "Bury Me Deep" |
| 1959 | The Third Man | Marguerite | Episode: "Confessions of an Honest Man" |
| 1959 | Playhouse 90 | June | Episode: "In Lonely Expectation" |
| 1959 | The DuPont Show of the Month | Antonia | Episode: "I, Don Quixote" |
| 1959 | Deadline | Peg Joyce | Episode: "Charm Boy" |
| 1959 | One Step Beyond | Aunt Minna Boswell | Episode: "The Dead Part of the House" |
| 1960 | Hotel de Paree | Jennifer Wheatley | Episode: "Sundance and the Barren Soil" |
| 1960 | Have Gun – Will Travel | Maggie | Episode: "Saturday Night" |
| 1961 | Gunsmoke | Beulah Parker | Episode: "Old Yellow Boots" |
| 1961 | Our American Heritage | Alice Hathaway Roosevelt | Episode: "The Invincible Teddy" |
| 1961 | The Twilight Zone | Lavinia | Episode: "The Passersby" |
| 1962 | Bus Stop | Donna Gibson | Episode: "I Kiss Your Shadow" |
| 1962 | Gunsmoke | Susan Bart | Episode: "The Ditch" |
| 1963 | The Dick Powell Show | Aura Tomlin | Episode: "Everybody Loves Sweeney" |
| 1966 | Bonanza | Maggie Dowling | Episode: "The Bridegroom" |
| 1967 | The Invaders | Angela Smith | Episode: "Moonshot" |
| 1968 | The Invaders | Professor Pat Reed | Episode: "The Pit" |
| 1968 | Star Trek | Romulan Commander | Episode: "The Enterprise Incident" |
| 1969 | Judd, for the Defense | Paula Miles | 2 episodes |
| 1969 | Hawaii Five-0 | Dr. C.L. Fremont | 2 Episodes: "Once Upon a Time, part 1" and "Once Upon a Time, part 2" |
| 1970 | House on Greenapple Road | Connie Durstine | TV movie |
| 1970 | Hawaii Five-0 | Camilla Carver | Kiss the Queen Goodbye |
| 1973 | Columbo | Vickie Hayward | Episode: "Candidate for Crime" |
| 1973 | The Streets of San Francisco | Rosemary | Episode: "Before I Die" |
| 1974 | The Streets of San Francisco | Martha Howard | Episode: "One Chance to Live" |
| 1979 | Barnaby Jones | Mimi Nettleson Chiles | 2 episodes |
| 1979 | Charlie's Angels | Maggie Brill | Episode: "Angels Go Truckin" |
| 1979 | Mrs. Columbo | Paula | Episode: "Falling Star" |
| 1981 | Behind the Screen | Zina Willow | Episode: "Pilot" |
| 1982–83 | Dynasty | Claire Maynard | 2 episodes |
| 1986 | The Right of the People | Rosalind | TV movie |
| 1988 | L.A. Law | Rona Samuels | Episode: "Romancing the Drone" |
| 1989 | From the Dead of Night | Dr. Ann Morgan | TV movie |
| 2001 | James Dean | Hedda Hopper | TV movie |
| 2016 | Starship Excelsior | The Delegate | Episode: "Tomorrow's Excelsior" |
