= The Midnight Sun (The Twilight Zone) =

- The Twilight Zone episode
- Episode no.: Season 3 Episode 10
- Directed by: Anton Leader
- Written by: Rod Serling
- Production code: 4818
- Original air date: November 17, 1961

Guest appearances
- Lois Nettleton as Norma; Betty Garde as Mrs. Bronson; Tom Reese as The Intruder; William Keene as Doctor; Jason Wingreen as Mr. Shuster; June Ellis as Mrs. Shuster

Episode chronology
← Previous "Deaths-Head Revisited"	Next → "Still Valley"
- The Twilight Zone (1959 TV series) (season 3)

"The Midnight Sun" is episode 75 of the American television anthology series The Twilight Zone, first shown in November, 1961.

== Opening narration ==
The word that Mrs. Bronson is unable to put into the hot, still, sodden air is 'doomed,' because the people you've just seen have been handed a death sentence. One month ago, the Earth suddenly changed its elliptical orbit and in doing so began to follow a path which gradually, moment by moment, day by day, took it closer to the Sun. And all of man's little devices to stir up the air are now no longer luxuries—they happen to be pitiful and panicky keys to survival. The time is five minutes to twelve, midnight. There is no more darkness. The place is New York City and this is the eve of the end, because even at midnight it's high noon, the hottest day in history, and you're about to spend it - in the Twilight Zone.

== Plot ==
The Earth's orbit has been perturbed, causing the planet to slowly fall into the Sun. A prolific artist, Norma, and her landlady, Mrs. Bronson, are the last residents in their New York apartment building. Their former neighbors have either moved north to seek a cooler climate or they have already perished from the extremely high temperatures.

At twenty minutes to midnight, it is 110 °F (43 °C) and sunny as high noon. Norma and Mrs. Bronson try to support each other as they watch life as they know it erode around them. The streets are deserted, water usage is limited to an hour a day, and their electricity is gradually being turned off. Food and water are scarce and the sea has dried up. A radio presenter announces that the police have been moved out of the city and that citizens must defend themselves against looters, then angrily goes off script before being forcibly taken off the air.

As the temperature rises to 120 °F (49 °C), the two women grow weaker. Norma burns her hand on a windowsill. Mrs. Bronson becomes psychologically unstable, beseeching Norma to paint a picture of a cool subject, rather than Norma's usual paintings of the Sun and burning cities. A looter enters the building through the roof door, which Mrs. Bronson neglected to lock. They hide in Norma's apartment. The looter calls from outside, demanding entry. Norma threatens him with a revolver, and they hear him walk away.

Against Norma's pleas, Mrs. Bronson unlocks the door, and the stranger forces his way in, grabs the revolver and drinks their water. He calms down after seeing their distress and begs for their forgiveness, claiming that he is an honest man driven insane by the heat. He throws away the revolver and describes the recent death of his wife and newborn child. He begs for forgiveness until Norma acknowledges him; he then leaves the building.

In an attempt to console Mrs. Bronson, Norma shows her an oil painting of a waterfall cascading into a lush pond. Mrs. Bronson deliriously claims that she can feel the coolness and splashes in the imaginary waters before dying from heat stroke. Norma sits in shock as the thermometer surges past 130 °F (54 °C) and shatters. The paint on the paintings begins to melt; she screams and collapses.

The scene cuts to the same apartment at night with heavy snow outside the windows. The thermometer reads −10 °F (−23 °C). Norma, who has been bedridden with a high fever, is being cared for by a doctor and Mrs. Bronson. The Earth moving closer to the Sun is revealed to be only a fever dream, while in reality the Earth is moving away from the Sun, and the world's inhabitants are actually freezing to death.

Norma tells Mrs. Bronson about her nightmare, adding, "Isn't it wonderful to have darkness, and coolness?" Mrs. Bronson's face stiffens in dread, and she replies, "Yes, my dear. It's...wonderful."

== Closing narration ==
The poles of fear, the extremes of how the Earth might conceivably be doomed. Minor exercise in the care and feeding of a nightmare, respectfully submitted by all the thermometer-watchers - in the Twilight Zone.

Rod Serling then appears on camera to promote the next episode: "Next week we move back into time, back to 1863. A distinguished actor, Mr. Gary Merrill plays the role of a Confederate scout who goes off on a patrol and winds up smack dab in the center of The Twilight Zone. Our story is an adaptation of a strange tale by Manly Wade Wellman called 'The Still Valley'. This one is for Civil War buffs and the students of the occult. I hope you're around to take a look at it."

== Production notes ==
The effect of the oil paintings melting was accomplished by painting the pictures in wax on the surface of a hotplate. Moreover, the episode was shot in the summer, on a set without air-conditioning, with the director actually turning up the heat on certain key scenes to create the necessary mood and appearance for the story.

== Deleted characters ==
Serling's original script featured two characters who did not appear in the completed episode: a police officer and a refrigerator repairman.

"I spent a lot of time with Buck Houghton, Twilight Zone's producer trying to reduce scripts, some by Rod, by one speaking part or two speaking parts because we were just about to start shooting the show and we were over budget. And Aubrey was really tough on this subject even if it were a small number of dollars." —Del Reisman quoted in Serling: The Rise And Twilight of Television's Last Angry Man.

== Critical response ==
J. Hoberman, excerpt from "America's Twilight Zone", published in Visions From the Twilight Zone by Arlen Schumer:

Whether explicitly nuclear or otherwise, the apocalypse was never far away [in the Twilight Zone]. "The Midnight Sun" was telecast on the day the U.S. consolidated its drive for "push-button warfare" with the first successful launching of a Minuteman missile from an underground silo. The episode substitutes a kink in the Earth's orbit—an analogue to what we currently call "the greenhouse effect"—for an atomic holocaust. Instead of blowing up, the planet is falling into the sun. Rape and pillage seem imminent, and even the pigment is boiling on the heroine-artist's canvases as the radio weatherman goes nuts on the air.

== Other media ==
- The radio version of The Twilight Zone featured a modernized version of this episode starring Kim Fields.
- In 2009 the original episode was adapted as a graphic novel, Rod Serling's The Twilight Zone: The Midnight Sun, by Mark Kneece and Anthony Spay.
