= The Jungle (The Twilight Zone) =

- The Twilight Zone episode
- Episode no.: Season 3 Episode 12
- Directed by: William F. Claxton
- Teleplay by: Charles Beaumont
- Based on: "The Jungle" by Charles Beaumont
- Production code: 4806
- Original air date: December 1, 1961

Guest appearances
- John Dehner; Emily McLaughlin; Walter Brooke; Jay Adler; Hugh Sanders; Howard Wright; Donald Foster

Episode chronology
← Previous "Still Valley"	Next → "Once Upon a Time"
- The Twilight Zone (1959 TV series) (season 3)

"The Jungle" is episode 77 of the American television anthology series The Twilight Zone, and is the twelfth episode of the third season. It first aired on December 1, 1961. This teleplay was written by Charles Beaumont, based on his short story of the same name, and was directed by recurring director William F. Claxton.

== Opening narration ==
The carcass of a goat, a dead finger, a few bits of broken glass and stone, and Mr. Alan Richards, a modern man of a modern age, hating with all his heart something in which he cannot believe and preparing – although he doesn't know it – to take the longest walk of his life, right down to the center – of The Twilight Zone.

== Plot ==
Alan Richards and his wife Doris have recently returned from Africa, where Alan's company is constructing a hydroelectric dam. He discovers she has secretly kept several items given to her by a local shaman for protection. When he confronts her about them, she says she is frightened by the natives opposed to the dam and begs him to stop construction. He burns one of the items and opens the door to leave for work. In the hallway of his apartment building, just outside his door, is the carcass of a goat.

Alan attends a board meeting, where they discuss the dam and the fact that, although the natives will benefit from it in the long run, they are upset that they will be displaced in order to build it. He warns that the local witch doctors have threatened to use black magic against anyone associated with the project. When the other board members scoff, he points out their own superstitions: one carries a rabbit's foot, another practices astrology, and even the building does not have a 13th floor.

Later, he is in a bar drinking with a friend, and shows him a lion's-tooth amulet Doris has given him. Supposedly the tooth will protect him against a lion attack. Alan begins to head home but finds his car won't start. He attempts to return to the bar but it is locked and he has forgotten his lion's-tooth amulet inside. He attempts to use a pay phone, but it's out of order. As Alan walks away, the phone rings. He answers it and hears jungle sounds.

He heads home on foot, still hearing the jungles and tribal drums all around him, becoming nervous and agitated. He tries to take a taxi home, but the driver dies suddenly while stopped at a traffic light. Alan meets a bum and asks him about the jungle noises, which the bum claims not to hear. He offers the bum money to escort him through the park, but the bum disappears while Alan's back is turned.

Alan continues on, and finally reaches the safety of his apartment. The noises suddenly stop. Relieved, Alan enters and pours himself a drink. He hears a lion's roar from the bedroom. When he opens the bedroom door, he finds an adult male lion on the bed, as well as his wife's corpse, as the lion leaps toward him and attacks him offscreen.

== Closing narration ==
Some superstitions, kept alive by the long night of ignorance, have their own special power. You'll hear of it through a jungle grapevine in a remote corner of the Twilight Zone.

== Cast ==
- John Dehner as Alan Richards
- Emily McLaughlin as Doris Richards
- Walter Brooke as Chad Cooper
- Jay Adler as Vagrant
- Hugh Sanders as Mr. Templeton
- Howard Wright as Mr. Hardy
- Donald Foster as Mr. Sinclair
- Jay Overholts as Taxi Driver
- Zamba the Lion as The Lion (uncredited)

== Production ==
- The original short story by Charles Beaumont appeared in If Magazine in 1954
- The soundtrack featured stock from "King Nine Will Not Return" by Fred Steiner, and African tribal music
