= A Game of Pool (The Twilight Zone, 1985) =

- The Twilight Zone episode
- Episode no.: Season 3 Episode 20
- Directed by: Randy Bradshaw
- Written by: George Clayton Johnson; William Bermender
- Original air date: February 4, 1989

Guest appearances
- Esai Morales as Jesse Cardiff; Maury Chaykin as Fats Brown

Episode chronology
← Previous "Something in the Walls"	Next → "Room 2426"

"A Game of Pool" is the fifty-fifth episode and the twentieth episode of the third season (1988–89) of the revived television series The Twilight Zone. It is a remake of the original series 1961 episode of the same name, dealing with a pool match between an up-and-coming player and a deceased pool legend.

== Plot ==
In a pool hall after closing time, a young pool player named Jesse Cardiff practices his shot and complains about being compared to pool legend Fats Brown. He boasts that if Fats were alive he could beat him. He turns around to see Fats Brown sitting in the bar. Fats tells Jesse that because he is legendary, in a sense he lives forever. Fats goads him into a match in which if Jesse loses, he will die, but if he wins, he lives - seemingly gaining nothing from victory.

They play and the match is fairly even. With Jesse needing to sink only one more ball to win, Fats distracts him by scuffing his pool chalk, making him miss. Fats then sinks all but the last ball he needs to win. Jesse gets a shot at the last ball and hits it, but it fails to go all the way to the pocket.

Fats lines up his shot and sinks it. Jesse questions him about the life or death stakes, and Fats tells Jesse that he will indeed die, eventually. If he had beaten Fats he would have lived forever. However, Fats had only led Jesse to believe he would immediately die if he lost because he wanted Jesse to play his best. As Fats disappears Jesse screams that it is not over, that he will practice more, and that he will eventually win.

== Production ==
This episode was written by George Clayton Johnson for the original Twilight Zone series. In that 1961 version, starring Jack Klugman and Jonathan Winters, Jesse wins and is bound to take up Fats's mantle as the greatest pool player in history. The ending used in the 1989 version was the original ending as intended by Johnson.

== Bibliography ==
- Zicree, Marc Scott: The Twilight Zone Companion. Sillman-James Press, 1982 (second edition)
