= The Arrival (The Twilight Zone) =

- The Twilight Zone episode
- Episode no.: Season 3 Episode 2
- Directed by: Boris Sagal
- Written by: Rod Serling
- Production code: 4814
- Original air date: September 22, 1961

Guest appearances
- Harold J. Stone as Grant Sheckly; Fredd Wayne as Paul Malloy; Noah Keen as Bengston; Robert Karnes as Robbins; Bing Russell as George Cousins; Jim Boles as Dispatcher

Episode chronology
← Previous "Two"	Next → "The Shelter"
- The Twilight Zone (1959 TV series) (season 3)

"The Arrival" is the second episode of the third season and 67th overall episode of the American television anthology series The Twilight Zone. It was written by the series' creator and showrunner Rod Serling, and was directed by Boris Sagal.

== Opening narration ==
This object, should any of you have lived underground for the better parts of your lives and never had occasion to look toward the sky, is an airplane, its official designation a DC-3. We offer this rather obvious comment because this particular airplane, the one you're looking at, is a freak. Now, most airplanes take off and land as per scheduled. On rare occasions they crash. But all airplanes can be counted on doing one or the other. Now, yesterday morning this particular airplane ceased to be just a commercial carrier. As of its arrival it became an enigma, a seven-ton puzzle made out of aluminum, steel, wire and a few thousand other component parts, none of which add up to the right thing. In just a moment, we're going to show you the tail end of its history. We're going to give you ninety percent of the jigsaw pieces and you and Mr. Sheckly here of the Federal Aviation Agency will assume the problem of putting them together along with finding the missing pieces. This we offer as an evening's hobby, a little extracurricular diversion which is really the national pastime in the Twilight Zone.

== Plot ==
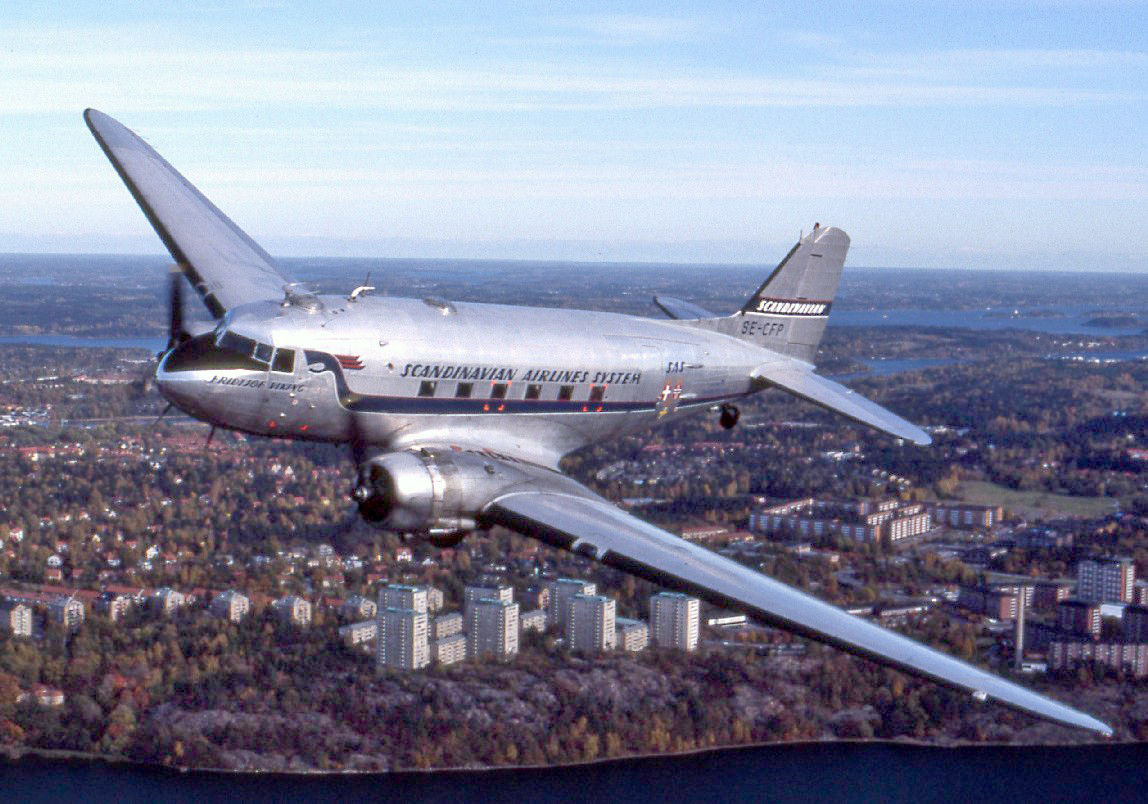
A Douglas DC-3

Flight 107, a propeller-driven Douglas DC-3 from Buffalo operated by Trans East Airlines, lands safely with no crew or passengers aboard. The FAA sends Grant Sheckly, an inspector with 22 years of experience and proud of his flawless record of solving cases, to investigate the matter. He is assisted by the airport staff — vice president Bengston, PR man Malloy, mechanic Robbins, and ramp attendant Cousins — but despite their combined efforts, no one can explain how an empty plane could safely land and taxi to a stop. Sheckly is nagged by the familiarity of the pilots' and passengers' names.

The investigation continues to prove fruitless until Robbins remarks about the plane's blue seats, which puzzles Sheckly, who remembers them from when he entered the plane as being brown. Bengston further says they were red. When they examine the plane's tail and each see different registration numbers, Sheckly claims the plane is not real, merely an illusion each of them has imagined somehow.

To prove his hypothesis, as well as to break the illusion, Sheckly proposes a simple, yet potentially fatal, test: he will put his arm in the arc of the plane's turning propeller. Despite their objections, he convinces the staff to go along with it, and Robbins starts the plane's engines. After some hesitation, Sheckly places his arm directly into the spinning propeller; just as he predicted, his arm remains unharmed, and the plane vanishes. However, when Sheckly successively turns to the others, he is met only with silence as they each disappear, just as the plane did.

Calling out for the staff, Sheckly makes his way back to the Operations room where he finds Bengston and Malloy, only to discover that they have no recollection of the empty plane or Sheckly's investigation. When asked, Bengston states that Flight 107 landed safely with full crew and passengers and shows him a newspaper article to prove it. But as Sheckly continues to press them about losing "Flight 107", Bengston remembers that the only plane the airline ever lost was a Flight 107, 17 or 18 years previously. The case had been investigated by Sheckly but was never solved, the only case he never figured out, closed as "presumed crashed for reasons unknown" at sea. Sheckly staggers away and as he wanders through the airfield he calls out, demanding to know the fate of Flight 107, then slumps onto the ramp as the sound of an aircraft's jet engine is heard passing overhead.

== Closing narration ==
Picture of a man with an Achilles' heel, a mystery that landed in his life and then turned into a heavy weight, dragged across the years to ultimately take the form of an illusion. Now, that's the clinical answer that they put on the tag as they take him away. But if you choose to think that the explanation has to do with an airborne Flying Dutchman, a ghost ship on a fog-enshrouded night on a flight that never ends, then you're doing your business in an old stand in the Twilight Zone.

== Critical responses ==
"The show now seems to be feeding off itself. Last Friday's episode, unless it proves to be an exception in the new skein, doesn't augur well for the future of the series. Twilight Zone seems to be running dry of inspiration." —from the Variety review.

”You should track down the episode. It’s not the strongest you’ll see of season three, let alone any other, but it has a kick ass moment of extreme tension that stands as quite memorable. At least to this particular viewer. Rod Serling delivers another slice of quality entertainment. The double twist earns major points.” —from the Addicted to Horror Movies review.

== Sources ==
- Zicree, Marc Scott: The Twilight Zone Companion. Sillman-James Press, 1982 (second edition)
- DeVoe, Bill. (2008). Trivia from The Twilight Zone. Albany, GA: Bear Manor Media; ISBN 978-1-59393-136-0
- Grams, Martin. (2008). The Twilight Zone: Unlocking the Door to a Television Classic. Churchville, MD: OTR Publishing; ISBN 978-0-9703310-9-0
