= The Shelter (The Twilight Zone) =

- The Twilight Zone episode
- Episode no.: Season 3 Episode 3
- Directed by: Lamont Johnson
- Written by: Rod Serling
- Production code: 4803
- Original air date: September 29, 1961

Guest appearances
- Larry Gates as Bill Stockton; Jack Albertson Jerry Harlowe; Sandy Kenyon as Frank Henderson; Peggy Stewart as Grace Stockton; Michael Burns as Paul Stockton; Joseph Bernard as Marty Weiss; Mary Gregory as Mrs. Henderson

Episode chronology
← Previous "The Arrival"	Next → "The Passersby"
- The Twilight Zone (1959 TV series) (season 3)

"The Shelter" is episode 68 of the American television anthology series The Twilight Zone. It originally aired on September 29, 1961, on CBS. It is one of the few Twilight Zone episodes to feature no supernatural or sci-fi elements.

== Opening narration ==
What you are about to watch is a nightmare. It is not meant to be prophetic, it need not happen, it's the fervent and urgent prayer of all men of good will that it never shall happen. But in this place, in this moment, it does happen. This is the Twilight Zone.

== Plot ==
It is a typical evening in a typical suburban community outside of New York City. At the residence of physician Bill Stockton, he enjoys a birthday party being thrown for him by his wife Grace and their son Paul. Also at the party are Jerry Harlowe, Bill's brother-in-law; Frank Henderson and Marty Weiss, Bill and Jerry's former college roommates; and the wives and children of Jerry, Frank, and Marty. Bill is well known and liked by this gathering. Moreover, Bill has repeatedly ministered to the health and well-being of each one of the guests. Everyone is friendly and jovial, even when mention is made of Bill's late-night work on a fallout shelter which he has built in his basement. Suddenly, a Civil Defense announcement overheard by young Paul is made that unidentified objects have been detected heading for the United States. In these times, everyone knows what this means: nuclear attack.

As panic ensues, Stockton locks himself and his family into his shelter. His friends become hysterical and now want to occupy the shelter. Stockton offers his basement to the guests, but the shelter itself has sufficient air, provisions, and space for a total of three people. The once-friendly neighbors do not accept this. All of the previous cordiality is now replaced with soaring desperation: pent-up hostility, nativism, and other suppressed emotions boil to the surface. They break down the shelter door with an improvised battering ram. Just then, a final Civil Defense broadcast announces that the objects have been identified as harmless satellites and that no danger is present. His neighbors apologize to each other, and to the doctor, for their behavior; yet Stockton wonders aloud if they were all destroyed without a bomb dropping.

== Closing narration ==
No moral, no message, no prophetic tract, just a simple statement of fact: for civilization to survive, the human race has to remain civilized. Tonight's very small exercise in logic - from the Twilight Zone.

== Cast ==
- Larry Gates as Dr. Bill Stockton
- Jack Albertson as Jerry Harlowe
- Sandy Kenyon as Frank Henderson
- Peggy Stewart as Grace Stockton
- Michael Burns as Paul Stockton
- Joseph Bernard as Marty Weiss
- Jo Helton as Martha Harlowe
- Moria Turner as Mrs. Weiss
- Mary Gregory as Mrs. Henderson
- John McLiam as Man
- James Coburn as the voice of the radio announcer (uncredited)

== Context ==
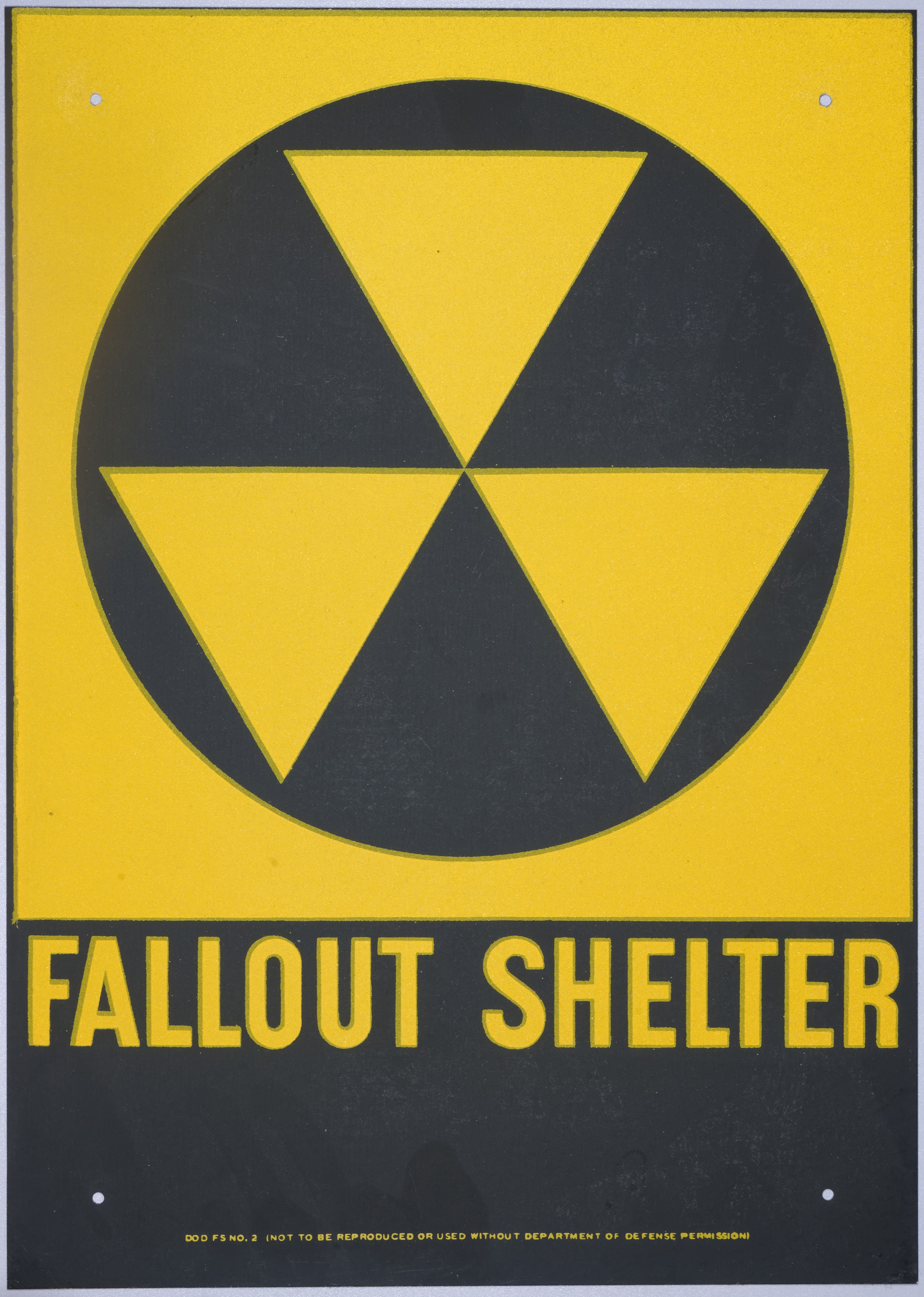
Fallout shelter sign from the United States

The episode aired after a summer in which the fallout shelter had loomed large in national discourse, due to the Berlin Crisis of 1961. Meeting with U.S. President John F. Kennedy in Vienna, Soviet Premier Nikita Khrushchev insisted—not for the first time—that NATO troops withdraw from Berlin, handing over the city to an independent, Soviet-aligned East Germany. Khrushchev explicitly threatened thermonuclear war if the United States refused to relent. Kennedy responded publicly seven weeks later in a televised address on July 25, 1961. During the speech, Kennedy stated his intention to ensure access to shelters in the event of a nuclear attack on the United States. In the aftermath of the speech, numerous companies began producing such shelters, and products were sold with explicit reference to the shelters; for instance, Foam-Ettes toothpaste tablets boasted that they could be used "wherever you are—even in a family fallout shelter." Rod Serling saw an opportunity for urgent social commentary and "rushed into production" an episode that would comment on prevailing anxieties. Two weeks after the episode aired, the crisis escalated and construction of the Berlin Wall began.

== Bibliography ==
- Zicree, Marc Scott: The Twilight Zone Companion. Sillman-James Press, 1982 (second edition)
- DeVoe, Bill. (2008). Trivia from The Twilight Zone. Albany, GA: Bear Manor Media. ISBN 978-1-59393-136-0
- Grams, Martin. (2008). The Twilight Zone: Unlocking the Door to a Television Classic. Churchville, MD: OTR Publishing. ISBN 978-0-9703310-9-0
- Henriksen, Margot A. Dr. Strangelove's America: Society and Culture in the Atomic Age. Berkeley: University of California Press, 1997.
- Perlstein, Rick. Before the Storm: Barry Goldwater and the Unmaking of the American Consensus. New York: Nation Books, 2009 [2001]. ISBN 978-1-56858-412-6
