= The Halloween That Almost Wasn't =

- VHS cover
- Genre: Comedy
- Written by: Liz Argo; Coleman Jacoby
- Directed by: Bruce Bilson
- Starring: Judd Hirsch; Mariette Hartley; Henry Gibson; Jack Riley; John Schuck; Robert Fitch
- Country of origin: United States
- Original language: English

Production
- Executive producer: Richard Barclay
- Producer: Gaby Monet
- Cinematography: Peter Sova
- Editor: Arthur Ginsberg
- Running time: 25 minutes
- Production company: Concepts Unlimited

Original release
- Network: ABC
- Release: October 28, 1979

The Halloween That Almost Wasn't is a 1979 American television special that revolves around Dracula (Judd Hirsch) trying to save Halloween from the Witch (Mariette Hartley) who threatens it. It won an Emmy Award for "Outstanding Individual Achievement – Children's Program" and was nominated for three others. On its VHS release, it was retitled The Night Dracula Saved the World.

The special, which premiered on ABC on October 28, 1979, was shot at Lyndhurst in Tarrytown, New York and was sponsored by Kenner. It also aired regularly on the Disney Channel during its Halloween season from 1983 to 1996.

== Plot ==
After hearing rumors from a TV newscaster that Halloween may end and that he is being blamed, Count Dracula exclaims, "How dare they suggest such a thing? Halloween is my national holiday!" and he calls the world's most famous monsters—Warren the Werewolf a.k.a. Wolf Man (Jack Riley) of Budapest, Frankenstein's monster (John Schuck), Zabaar the Zombie (Josip Elic) of Haiti, the Mummy of Egypt and the Witch - to his castle to make them frightening again. Dracula believes that the problem is that the monsters have "exploited their monsterhood" to the point of being funny rather than scary; for example, Frankenstein's monster has let a film influence him into tapdancing rather than frightening people. As it turns out, the rumor about Halloween coming to an end was started by the Witch herself; sick and tired of jokes about how ugly she is, she no longer wishes to participate and without her annual ride over the Moon, there can be no more Halloween. She has prepared a list of demands, which Dracula refuses to meet, so she rides off to her own castle.

Dracula pursues the Witch as a bat, but realizes that the sun is about to come up and he goes back into his mausoleum. The next evening, on the night before Halloween, he and the other monsters break into the Witch's castle. They have her cornered, but she turns a painting of Three Musketeers into minions. After a brief chase scene using The Munsters-style fast motion, the Witch is cornered in a room, while Igor (Henry Gibson) has her broom. Dracula turns into a bat again to sneak under the door, but gets smashed by the Witch and comes back; Igor tries climbing on a ledge and swinging into the room through a window Hunchback of Notre Dame-style, only to have the Witch open the door so he goes right back outside.

Although Dracula finally gives in to the Witch's demands (including a randomly added wish for him to take her disco dancing every night), she suddenly changes her mind and decides not to go along. Then, a pair of children who were watching the newscast of the events on TV appear outside the door, one dressed as the Witch, and plead with her, telling her they love her the way she is. Moved by the children, she does her ride over the moon as promised.

The film concludes with a disco scene during which the Witch transforms into a disco queen resembling the character Stephanie Mangano from the movie Saturday Night Fever by doing a Wonder Woman-style spin, and Dracula, figuring he may as well go with the flow, rips off his costume to reveal a Tony Manero-esque leisure suit mimicking John Travolta's character from that same film.

== Cast ==
- Judd Hirsch as Count Dracula
- Mariette Hartley as the Witch
- Henry Gibson as Igor
- Jack Riley as the Werewolf
- John Schuck as Frankenstein's Monster
- Josip Elic as Zabaar the Zombie
- Robert Fitch as the Mummy

== Release and availability ==
Following its debut in 1979, the film aired regularly as part of the Disney's Halloween Treat/A Disney Halloween special until the 1990s when that block was replaced. Although it was released on VHS, it has never been released on DVD or Blu-ray.

In 2015, the program was spoofed by RiffTrax.
