= Vaughn Taylor (actor) =

American actor (1910–1983)

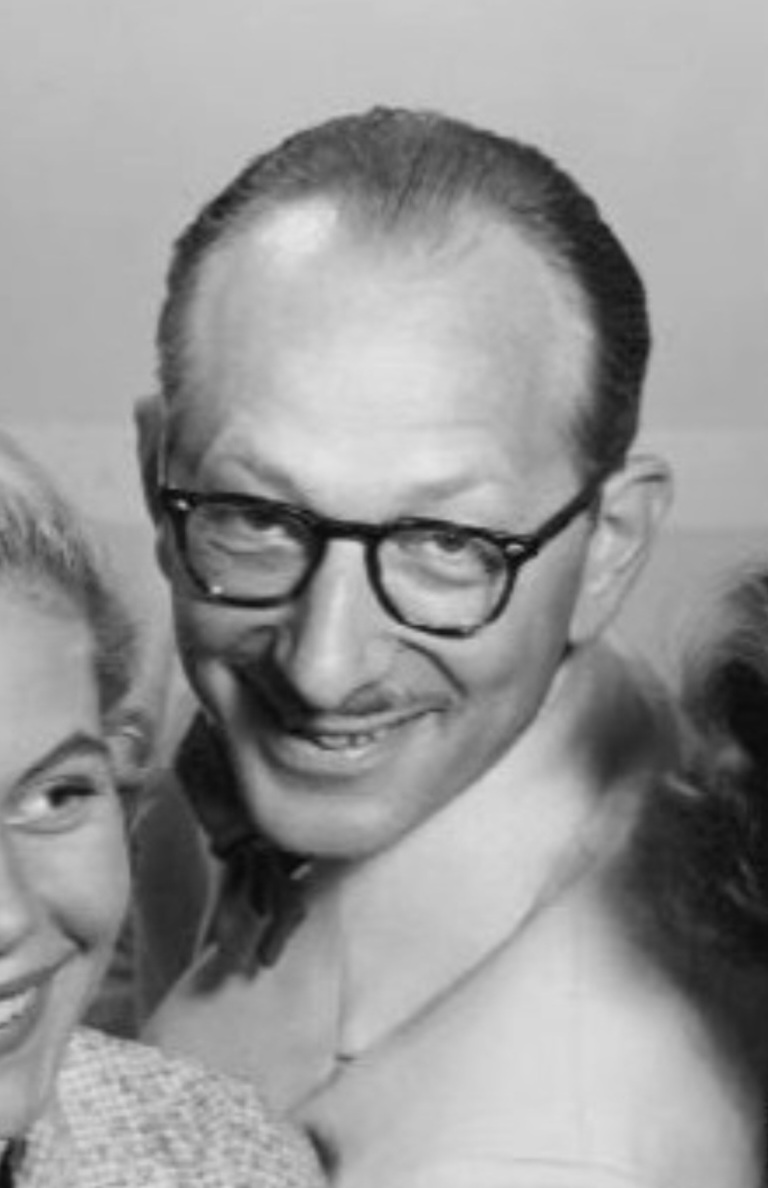
- Taylor in Robert Montgomery Presents (1952)
- Born: Vaughn Everett Taylor; February 22, 1910; Boston, Massachusetts, U.S.
- Died: April 26, 1983 (aged 73); Los Angeles, California, U.S.
- Education: Northeastern University; Leland Powers School
- Occupation: Actor
- Years active: 1933–1976
- Spouse: Ruth Moss (m. 1945)

Vaughn Everett Taylor (February 22, 1910 – April 26, 1983) was an American actor. He became known for his roles in many anthology series, including Kraft Television Theatre (1947–1957) and Robert Montgomery Presents (1950–1954). He also appeared in films such as Cat on a Hot Tin Roof (1958) and Psycho (1960).

== Early years ==
Taylor was born in Boston, Massachusetts. He was a graduate of Northeastern University and the Leland Powers School of Elocution, Boston. Instead of pursuing a career in accounting, he tried summer stock theatre in Maine. After army service in World War II, he broke into TV. His wife Ruth Moss was a radio personality and Broadway actress.

After joining the Army as a private, Taylor became an officer via officer candidate school. Later he joined military intelligence and produced instructional plays about aspects of military intelligence to educate students from the Army.

== Career ==
=== Stage ===
After his experience in summer stock, he joined a dramatic company and for several years participated in one-night productions in small towns in the Midwest. On Broadway, Taylor appeared in Hope's the Thing (1948).

=== Film ===
Taylor began his career in film in Up Front (1951). His film appearances include Jailhouse Rock (1957), Decision at Sundown (1957), Gunsmoke in Tucson (1958),Cowboy (1958), Screaming Mimi (1958), Cat on a Hot Tin Roof (1958), Warlock (1959), The Gallant Hours (1960), The Plunderers (1960), Diamond Head (1963), The Wheeler Dealers (1963), The Carpetbaggers (1964), The Unsinkable Molly Brown (1964), The Russians Are Coming, the Russians Are Coming (1966), The Professionals (1966), In Cold Blood (1967), The Shakiest Gun in the West (1968), The Power (1968), The Ballad of Cable Hogue (1970).

In 1960 he appeared in Alfred Hitchcock's Psycho as Mr. Lowery, Marion Crane's employer in a small real estate office. The same year he starred in the movie about Admiral William F. Halsey, The Gallant Hours, as Commander Mike Pulaski, USN. Taylor's final film appearance was in another comedy, The Gumball Rally, released in 1976.

=== Television ===
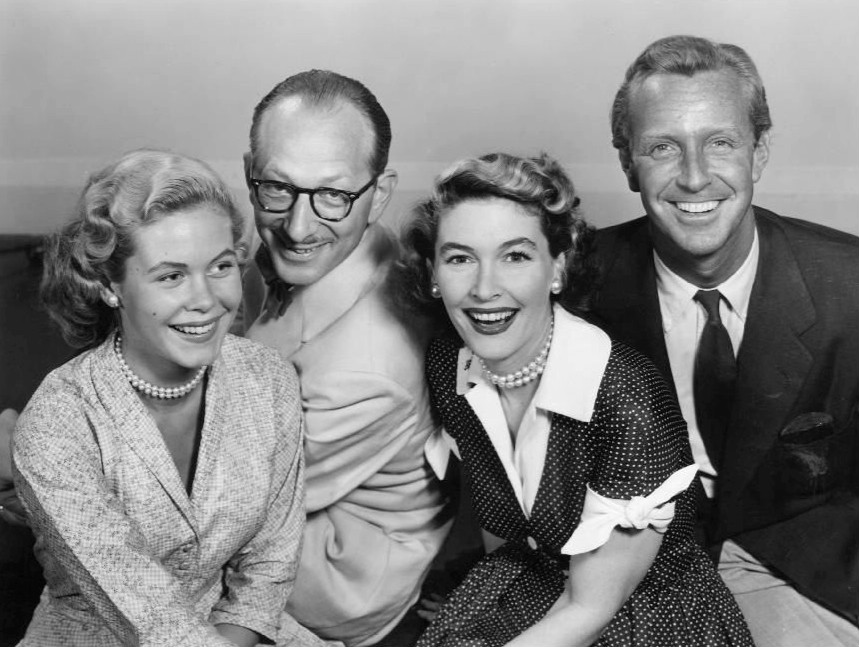
Ensemble cast of Robert Montgomery Presents (from left): Elizabeth Montgomery, Vaughn Taylor, Margaret Hayes and John Newland

Taylor portrayed Horatio Frisby on the comedy series Johnny Jupiter. He was also a regular performer on Montgomery's Summer Stock, which was a summer replacement for Robert Montgomery Presents from 1953 through 1956.

In his many television appearances, Taylor was cast as Julian Tyler in the 1957 episode "The Chess Player" of the CBS crime drama, Richard Diamond, Private Detective, starring David Janssen. He appeared too in several episodes of CBS's Twilight Zone, including the role of the salesman in S3 E35 (1962) "I Sing the Body Electric". He also appeared in "Time Enough at Last", "Still Valley", "The Incredible World of Horace Ford" and "The Self-Improvement of Salvadore Ross".

In 1958, Taylor appeared in The Martin Poster, the first episode of Steve McQueen's CBS western series, Wanted: Dead or Alive as a doctor shot to death in the back by the brother of an outlaw whom he had treated. In a later episode, titled "Criss-Cross" he appeared as a doctor 'Doc Adams' whose son is a thief whom Josh has brought in, only to lose the bounty because the doctor paid someone else to take the blame. He also played Olie Ridgers in the Gunsmoke episode "Claustrophobia" (Season 3, Episode 20).

In 1959, Taylor appeared in The Untouchables Episode 2, Ma Barker and Her Boys, as Pa Barker. Taylor guest starred as Jeremy Tolliver in the title role in the 1959 episode "The Trouble with Tolliver" of the ABC western drama The Man from Blackhawk as a roving insurance investigator.

He was cast in 1960 again as a physician, Bryan Craig, in the episode "Strange Encounter" of the ABC/Warner Brothers western series, Colt .45. He also guest starred in the ABC/WB detective series, Bourbon Street Beat and in the 1960 NBC summer western series, Tate, starring David McLean.

Taylor was cast as bank president Houghton in the 1961 episode "The Proxy" on another ABC western series, The Rebel, starring Nick Adams, with whom Taylor had worked three years earlier in Wanted: Dead or Alive. Taylor was cast as Pettis in the 1961 episode "The Debt" on the NBC western series Laramie.

In 1962 he appeared in one episode as the head college librarian opposite Gertrude Berg in her short-lived sitcom Mrs. G. Goes to College.

In 1963, he appeared in an episode of Hazel, "The Fire's Never Dead While the Ashes are Red," as a law professor who wrote a best-selling novel and is reunited with his lost love though Hazel's machinations.

He was also a frequent guest on CBS's Perry Mason legal drama, having appeared eight times, including Louis Boles in the premiere episode, "The Case of the Restless Redhead" in 1957. In 1959, he played the title role, murder victim Bishop Arthur Mallory, in "The Case of the Stuttering Bishop." In 1961, he played defendant Ralph Duncan in "The Case of the Fickle Fortune." In 1963, he again played the murder victim and title character; this time as Martin Weston in "The Case of the Witless Witness."

Taylor was cast in two episodes of the ABC science fiction series The Outer Limits; in "Expanding Human" as Dean Flint, and "The Guests" as Mr. Latimer. In addition, he appeared in the pilot episode of The Invaders entitled "Beachhead".

Usually involved in dramatic roles, Taylor continued to accept work in comedic productions. He appeared in a 1964 episode of the CBS sitcom The Cara Williams Show. In 1965, he played Professor Clemmens in the 1965 episode "Uncle Martin and the Identified Flying Object" of My Favorite Martian. He also played in the Get Smart episode "The Diary," in 1966, in which he portrayed Herb Gaffer, a retired secret agent sought by CONTROL agent Maxwell Smart (Don Adams) and by enemy spies. Taylor gets a chance in the plot to exchange humorous takes with Adams and perform some physical comedy. Another veteran of acting, Ellen Corby, also appears in this same Get Smart episode, which takes place in "Spy City," a retirement community for former agents.

Between 1961 and 1970, Taylor guest starred in four episodes of the western TV series Bonanza, in which he portrayed the following characters: Horace Ogleby ("The Infernal Machine", 1961), C. R. Lively ("A Real Nice, Friendly Little Town", 1966), Eggers ("Judgment at Olympus", 1967) and Bert Taylor ("Is There Any Man Here?", 1970).

In 1966 and 1968, Taylor made guest appearances on Petticoat Junction. In 1966, he played Mr. Foley, episode: "Better Never Than Late", and in 1968, he played Mr. Clayton, in the episode "Uncle Joe Runs the Hotel". In 1968, he also appeared in the 4th episode of the first season of The Ghost and Mrs. Muir.

=== Recognition ===
Taylor was nominated for the Emmy Award for Best Actor in 1952 and 1953.

== Death ==
On April 26, 1983, Taylor died at Cedars-Sinai Medical Center of a cerebral hemorrhage. He was 73.

== Filmography ==
- Picture Snatcher (1933) - Editor (uncredited)
- Up Front (1951) - MP Major Lester
- Francis Goes to the Races (1951) - Chief Inspector Carrington
- Meet Danny Wilson (1952) - T.W. Hatcher
- Back at the Front (1952) - Major Lester Ormsby
- It Should Happen to You (1954) - Entrikin
- This Could Be the Night (1957) - Ziggy Dawit - Columnist
- Jailhouse Rock (1957) - Mr. Shores
- Decision at Sundown (1957) - Mr. Baldwin
- Wanted Dead or Alive (1957) - Dr. Glen Leach - Episode: "The Martin Poster"
- Cowboy (1958) - Mr. Fowler, Chicago Hotel Manager
- The Young Lions (1958) - John Plowman (uncredited)
- The Lineup (1958) - The Man
- Cheyenne (1958) - Doc Johnson - Episode: "Ghost of the Cimarron"
- Screaming Mimi (1958) - Raoul Reynarde
- Cat on a Hot Tin Roof (1958) - Deacon Davis
- Party Girl (1958) - Dr. Caderman (uncredited)
- Gunsmoke in Tucson (1958) - Ben Bodeen
- Andy Hardy Comes Home (1958) - Thomas Chandler
- Warlock (1959) - Henry Richardson
- Blue Denim (1959) - Professor Willard
- The Gallant Hours (1960) - Commander Mike Pulaski
- Psycho (1960) - George Lowery
- The Plunderers (1960) - Jess Walters, General Store Owner
- The Wizard of Baghdad (1960) - Norodeen
- Wanted Dead or Alive (1960) - Doc Adams - Episode: "Criss-Cross"
- Diamond Head (1962) - Judge James Blanding
- FBI Code 98 (1962) - Joseph Petersen
- The Wheeler Dealers (1963) - Thaddeus Whipple
- The Carpetbaggers (1964) - Doctor
- The Unsinkable Molly Brown (1964) - Mr. Cartwright
- Zebra in the Kitchen (1965) - Councilman Pew
- Dark Intruder (1965) - Dr. Burdett
- The Russians Are Coming, the Russians Are Coming (1966) - Mr. Bell
- The Professionals (1966) - Banker
- The Last Challenge (1967) - Jim Haskell (uncredited)
- In Cold Blood (1967) - Good Samaritan
- The Power (1968) - Mr. Hallson
- Fever Heat (1968) - Toad Taplinger
- The Shakiest Gun in the West (1968) - Reverend Longbaugh
- My Dog, the Thief (1969) - The Dog Catcher
- The Ballad of Cable Hogue (1970) - Powell
- The Million Dollar Duck (1971) - Bank President (uncredited)
- The Gumball Rally (1976) - Andy McAllister - Mercedes Team (final film role)

== Television ==
Year	Title	Role	Notes
1959	The Twilight Zone	Carswell	Season 1 episode "Time Enough at Last"
1961	Rawhide	Judge Brady	Season 3 episode "Incident of the Phantom Bugler"
1961	The Twilight Zone	Teague	Season 3 episode "Still Valley"
1963	The Twilight Zone	Mr. Judson	Season 4 episode "The Incredible World of Horace Ford"
1963	The Alfred Hitchcock Hour	Dr. Babcock	Season 1 episode "The Long Silence"
1964	The Twilight Zone	Mr. Maitland	Season 5 episode "The Self-Improvement of Salvadore Ross"
