= The Rip Van Winkle Caper =

- The Twilight Zone episode
- Episode no.: Season 2 Episode 24
- Directed by: Justus Addiss
- Written by: Rod Serling
- Production code: 173-3655
- Original air date: April 21, 1961

Guest appearances
- Simon Oakland as DeCruz; Oscar Beregi, Jr., as Farwell; Lew Gallo as Brooks; John Mitchum as Erbie; Wallace Rooney as George; Shirley O'Hara as George's wife

Episode chronology
← Previous "A Hundred Yards Over the Rim"	Next → "The Silence"
- The Twilight Zone (1959 TV series, season 2)

"The Rip Van Winkle Caper" is episode 60 of the American television anthology series The Twilight Zone, and is the 24th episode of the second season. It originally aired on April 21, 1961 on CBS, and was written by series creator and showrunner Rod Serling, and was directed by Justus Addiss.

== Opening narration ==
Introducing four experts in the questionable art of crime: Mr. Farwell, expert on noxious gases, former professor, with a doctorate in both chemistry and physics; Mr. Erbie, expert in mechanical engineering; Mr. Brooks, expert in the use of firearms and other weaponry; and Mr. De Cruz, expert in demolition and various forms of destruction. The time is now, and the place is a mountain cave in Death Valley, U.S.A. In just a moment, these four men will utilize the services of a truck placed in cosmoline, loaded with a hot heist cooled off by a century of sleep, and then take a drive into The Twilight Zone.

== Plot ==
Four men are fleeing from the law in a truck after stealing $1 million worth of gold bars from a train bound from Fort Knox to Los Angeles. The thieves, consisting of scientist/mastermind Farwell, demolitions expert De Cruz, firearms expert Brooks, and mechanical engineer Erbie, hide in a secret cave in Death Valley, where Farwell has hidden a set of suspended animation chambers for the group to sleep for approximately 100 years. After that time, he expects that they will be able to sell the gold without raising suspicion. De Cruz has reservations about the plan, but all four men enter the chambers.

When they wake up, they find that Erbie has died, his chamber broken open by a falling rock. De Cruz offers to guard the gold and their truck while Brooks drives to civilization, but Brooks does not trust De Cruz and insists that he drive. De Cruz kills Brooks with the truck, but when the brakes fail, he bails out and leaves the truck to crash into a ravine. As a result, Farwell and De Cruz are forced to walk through the desert in the summer heat, carrying as much gold as they can on their backs.

Along the road, Farwell discovers he has lost his canteen and begins trading gold bars to De Cruz in exchange for some of his water. When De Cruz increases the price, Farwell strikes him with a bar and kills him. Farwell gathers up as much gold as he can carry and continues on, but is forced to discard it gradually as the weight becomes increasingly burdensome. Finally, weak and dehydrated, he collapses.

Farwell regains consciousness and finds a man standing over him. He feebly offers his last gold bar in exchange for water and a ride to the nearest town, but dies before the man can respond. Upon returning to his car, the man tells his wife that Farwell is dead and remarks that the latter offered him a gold bar as if it were valuable. She reminds him that people once used gold for money, but he points out that that was about 100 years ago, before mankind found a way to manufacture it.

== Closing narration ==
The last of four Rip Van Winkles, who all died precisely the way they lived, chasing an idol across the sand to wind up bleached dry in the hot sun as so much desert flotsam, worthless as the gold bullion they built a shrine to. Tonight's lesson - in The Twilight Zone.

== Cast ==
- Simon Oakland as Mr. De Cruz
- Oscar Beregi as Mr. Farwell
- Lew Gallo as Mr. Brooks
- John Mitchum as Mr. Erbie
- Wallace Rooney as a passer-by, George
- Shirley O'Hara as a passer-by, George's wife

== Production notes ==
The futuristic car carrying the couple who find the dying Farwell is a leftover prop, somewhat modified, from MGM's 1956 film Forbidden Planet.

== See also ==
- List of The Twilight Zone (1959 TV series) episodes
- "Rip Van Winkle", the 1819 short story by Washington Irving
- Paradox of value
