= Ray Turner (pianist) =

American pianist, musician

Raymond (Ray) Turner (15 March 1903, Kenosha, Wisconsin - February 1976, Hollywood, California) was an American pianist, session musician and recording artist.

== Biography ==
The classically trained Turner, whose father Smith Turner was also a pianist, was an accomplished and versatile musician, fluent in a wide range of musical style and genres. Although he was mainly known to the record-buying public for the classical, novelty, children's and honky tonk recordings he made in the 1940s and 1950s, Turner's primary career was as a studio session musician in the golden era of Hollywood film, including a two-decade tenure as the staff pianist for Paramount Studios from 1927 to the late 1940s.

Turner studied piano with Bella Robinson, then studied accompaniment with Richard Hageman at Chicago Musical College, and with composer and teacher Frank La Forge, and then studied solo piano with noted Mexican pianist Ernesto Berúmen.

Turner became a prominent jazz pianist in the 1920s, and he spent two-years as the pianist in the renowned Paul Whiteman Orchestra from 1925 to 1927, participating in the group's tours of Europe and the U.S.

After leaving the Whiteman Orchestra in 1927 he was appointed as the staff pianist at Paramount Studios, where worked for over 20 years. After leaving Paramount, he became a freelance session musician, and went on to perform on the music soundtracks of many other prominent film and TV productions in a screen career that spanned more than four decades.

During his Paramount tenure, Turner frequently worked as an accompanist for the studio's musical stars, such as Bing Crosby, and he was pianist, either solo or as a member of the studio orchestra, on the musical soundtracks of dozens of Paramount productions.

Although he was generally uncredited during his long screen career, Turner's work has been regularly heard by millions of viewers thanks to his extensive work in film and TV, and he worked with many prominent screen composers, most notably Dimitri Tiomkin, with whom Turner became lifelong friends, and who Turner credited as having greatly assisted in his career.

Turner also occasionally appeared on screen as an accompanist, but was typically uncredited. He can be briefly seen at the piano in the 1935 musical comedy Millions in the Air, in a scene featuring Bob Cummings and Eleanor Whitney. Other notable (uncredited) soundtrack performances include playing piano for the soundtrack of cult musical fantasy film The 5,000 Fingers of Dr. T., and the silent-film-styled piano backing (playing music composed by William Lava) for the silent segments of the Twilight Zone episode "Once Upon a Time", starring Buster Keaton.

One of Turner's most widely heard commercial recordings was his work as the featured pianist on the popular 1948 Capitol Records children's album Sparky's Magic Piano. During his commercial recording career he also collaborated with orchestra leader Victor Young and Brazilian composer Laurindo Almeida.

Ray Turner died in Hollywood, CA. in February 1976, one month short of his 73rd birthday.

== Notable film and TV soundtrack performances (partial list) ==
- Dr. Jekyll and Mr. Hyde (1931)
- A Farewell to Arms (1932)
- Love Me Tonight (1932)
- This Is the Night (1932)
- Murder at the Vanities (1934)
- Ruggles of Red Gap (1935)
- Here is My Heart (1935)
- Mississippi (1935)
- Millions in the Air (1935)
- Desire (1936)
- Souls at Sea (1937)
- Angel (1937)
- The Great Victor Herbert (1939)
- The Lost Weekend (1945)
- Rhapsody in Blue (film) (1945)
- The Man I Love (1947)
- The Thing from Another World (1951)
- The 5,000 Fingers of Dr. T. (1953)
- The Egyptian (1954)
- Land of the Pharaohs (1955)
- Around the World in 80 Days 1956
- Rio Bravo (1959)
- From the Terrace (1960)
- Once Upon a Time (The Twilight Zone) (1961)
- The Great Escape (1963)
- The Flight of the Phoenix (1965)
- The Dirty Dozen (1967)
- The Shoes of the Fisherman (1968)
- Ironside (1967-68)
- Beneath the Planet of the Apes (1970)
- The Omega Man (1971)

== Discography (partial) ==
=== Singles and EPs ===
- Henry Blair with Ray Turner - Sparky's Magic Piano (Capitol CL 13063, 1949)
- "The Entertainers Rag" / "Rock Island Rag" (Capitol 1950)
- "Jim Jams" / "The Entertainer's Rag" (Capitol)
- Chopin - "Waltz in E minor" / "Waltz Opus 64 No. 2 in C# minor" (Capitol 54–20171)
