= Josip Elic =

American actor (1921–2019)

- Born: Joseph Elich Jr. March 10, 1921; Butte, Montana, U.S.
- Died: October 21, 2019 (aged 98); River Edge, New Jersey, U.S.
- Occupation: Actor
- Years active: 1955–1989

Josip Elic (born Joseph Elich Jr.; March 10, 1921 – October 21, 2019) was an American actor. He is best known for his role as Bancini in the film One Flew Over the Cuckoo's Nest (1975).

== Early life ==
Elic was born in Butte, Montana, the son of Croatian immigrants, Martha and Joseph Elich. One of several children, including siblings John and Helen, he grew up in the East Side neighborhood known as "Cabbage Patch". At age 16, he began work in a Montana copper mine, before later joining the U.S. Navy. In 1945, following his service, and a brief stint on Wall Street, Elic relocated to New York City to pursue an acting career, using the G.I. Bill to enroll in acting school. At the age of 30, he officially changed his name in homage to his Croatian roots. Initially entering show business by building sets for an Upstate Connecticut summer stock company, he eventually began appearing in off-Broadway productions, including Threepenny Opera in 1954, alongside Bea Arthur and John Astin.

== Career ==
While off-Broadway shows and burlesque were amongst Elic's first forays into acting, in 1956, the 6-foot-3-inch Montanan landed his first television role on the NBC anthology series Kraft Television Theatre, opposite Rance Howard and Joe Mantell, in an episode directed by William A. Graham. While numerous minor television and film roles soon followed, Elic was also notable for his commercial appearances, becoming one of the first character actors to headline television ads, a role traditionally reserved for Hollywood's leading men. He later became more nationally recognized after two appearances on The Twilight Zone, including in "The Obsolete Man" with Burgess Meredith. His breakout role however came when asked to appear as confused mental patient, Bancini, in Miloš Forman's 1975 classic, One Flew Over the Cuckoo's Nest. Despite having few lines in the film, his major scene came in the form of an improvisation by Jack Nicholson for the patient's basketball game. In his words, Elic remembered the scene's development as:

"I'm sitting down there on the bench watching them play basketball, and all of a sudden somebody is on my shoulders with their legs over my shoulders and over my head. It was Jack Nicholson. I got up and said, 'I'll play the game with him' and I started playing basketball. He had thighs like you wouldn't believe. Holy crap. He said to me, 'If I fall, I close this picture down for a week. I said, 'If I fall, I'll close this picture down for two weeks."

Although his film and television career began to dwindle by the late seventies, Elic's final on-screen performance was in 1989 for the Ridley Scott action thriller, Black Rain. Regardless of his disappearance from television and theater screens however, he continued to maintain a strong presence in the acting community of New York, and would regularly make appearances at conventions to meet fans.

== Personal life and death ==
Suffering a fall in his New York apartment, Elic briefly stayed at the home of his longtime friend, actress Lee Meredith, and her husband, Bert, before moving into the Brookdale Senior Living assisted-living residence in Paramus, New Jersey.

In October 2019, at the age of 98, Elic died of complications from his fall.

== Filmography ==
=== Film ===
Year	Title	Role	Notes
1960	Murder, Inc.	Red Alpert	
1961	Pocketful of Miracles	Darcey Henchman	Uncredited
1962	Third of a Man	Dancer	Uncredited
1962	Convicts 4	Vic the Barber	
1964	Santa Claus Conquers the Martians	Shim	as Joe Elic
1967	The Producers	Violinist	
1968	For Love of Ivy	Off Broadway Family	
1969	Trilogy	HaHa	(segment "A Christmas Memory")
1971	Who Is Harry Kellerman and Why Is He Saying Those Terrible Things About Me?	Chomsky	
1972	The Stoolie	1st Hijacker	
1972	Dirty Little Billy	Jawbone	
1973	From the Mixed-Up Files of Mrs. Basil E. Frankweiler	Workman	
1975	One Flew Over the Cuckoo's Nest	Bancini	
1977	The World's Greatest Lover	Headwaiter	
1979	The Halloween That Almost Wasn't	Zabaar the Zombie	ABC television special
1989	Black Rain	Joe the Bartender	(final film role)

=== Television ===
Year	Title	Role	Episode	Notes
1956	Kraft Theatre	Pvt. Adams	"Paper Foxhole"	
1959	The Phil Silvers Show	Bopster	"Bilko's Bopster"	
1959	The DuPont Show of the Month	Centipede	"I, Don Quixote"	
1961	Peter Gunn	Professor Thurston	"The Deep End"	
1961	The Asphalt Jungle	Luther	"The Fighter"	
1961	The Dick Powell Theatre	Gunsel	"Doyle Against the House"	
1961	The Untouchables	Nitti Hood	"Tunnel of Horrors"	Uncredited
1961	The Twilight Zone	Subaltern	"The Obsolete Man"	as Josep Elic
1961	Follow the Sun	Ralph Metz	"The Woman Who Never Was"	
1962	The Twilight Zone	Electrician	"One More Pallbearer"	Uncredited
1962	Follow the Sun	Herschel	"Run, Clown, Run"	
1966	ABC Stage 67	HaHa	"A Christmas Memory"	
