= Harry Fleer =

American actor (1916–1994)

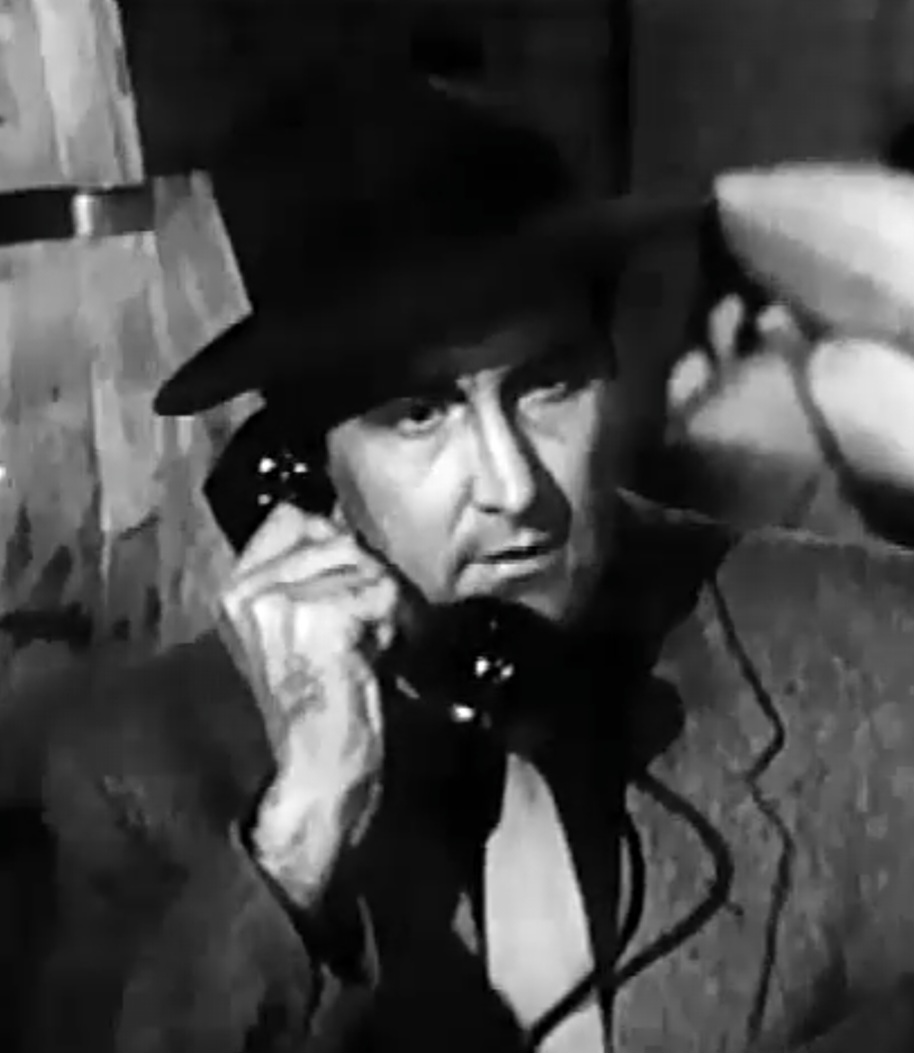
- Fleer in an episode of Treasury Men in Action (1955)
- Born: March 26, 1916; Quincy, Illinois, United States
- Died: October 14, 1994 (aged 78); Los Angeles, California, United States
- Occupation: Actor
- Years active: 1955–1994

Harry Fleer (March 26, 1916 – October 14, 1994) was an American actor. He appeared in more than sixty films and television shows between 1955 and 1994.

Fleer left his hometown of Quincy, Illinois, to attend Northwestern University in 1934 with no plans to be a professional entertainer. He said, "I looked upon music as a serious avocation, and if I hadn't been going to the university during the depression, I would never have gone into this business." His plans began to change after he performed during a College Night event at a night club in Chicago. A radio producer who saw him set up an audition, and the result was a three-day-a-week program of his own. He entered the competition on the Gateway to Hollywood radio program. Although he won twice—once for music and once for drama—he did not win the overall contest. He had offers from five film companies, but he said that he accepted "the wrong offer". Fleer then studied at the Max Reinhardt school and acted in summer stock in the eastern United States. He sang on Broadway as a member of the chorus in The Trojan Women (1941).

Fleer joined the Army soon after his summer stock experience. After initially serving as an actor he went to officer candidate school and infantry school. He gained a commission in anti-aircraft artillery, and he served three months in Japan after V-J Day. He returned to Broadway to portray Lionel in Toplitzky of Notre Dame (1947).

Fleer was cast six times from 1957 to 1960 on the syndicated television anthology series, Death Valley Days, hosted by Stanley Andrews. In "The Camel Train" (1957), he played Secretary of War Jefferson Davis, who commissions an experiment of using camels in the southwestern desert country headed by Lieutenant Edward Fitzgerald Beale, played by Stanley Lachman. Later, he was Wyatt Earp in "Birth of a Boom" (1958).

== Filmography ==
Year	Title	Role	Notes
1956	Three Brave Men	Keating	Uncredited
1956	Highway Patrol	Patrolman	
1957	The Unearthly	Harry Jedrow	
1957	Band of Angels	Aide	Uncredited
1957	The Devil's Hairpin	Customer	Uncredited
1958	From Hell to Texas	Cowpuncher	Uncredited
1959	The Cosmic Man	Bill, the Park Ranger	
1960	Heller in Pink Tights	Gambler	Uncredited
1960	Tormented	Frank Hubbard	
1961	Atlantis, the Lost Continent	Governor of Science	Uncredited
1961	Devil's Partner	John Winters	
1961	Bat Masterson	Harvey Field	
1963	The Gun Hawk	Curly	
1963	Shock Corridor	Attendant	
1964	Viva Las Vegas	Son of the Lone Star State	Uncredited
1965	Dear Brigitte	T-Man	Uncredited
1965	Mirage	Passenger	Uncredited
1966	Made in Paris	Mathews	Uncredited
1966	The Rare Breed	Barler	Uncredited
1966	The Oscar	Director	Uncredited
1966	The Swinger	Cop	Uncredited
1967	Divorce American Style	Bank Guard	Uncredited
1967	The Big Mouth	Male Nurse	Uncredited
1967	Who's Minding the Mint?	Doorman	Uncredited
1969	The Wrecking Crew	Police Officer	Uncredited
1969	The Comic	Cop	Uncredited
1970	Triangle		
1994	Little Giants	Orville	
1994	The St. Tammany Miracle	Sam	
