= Montgomery Pittman =

American actor (1920–1962)

- Born: Montgomery Cherlez Pittman; March 1, 1917; New Orleans, Louisiana, U.S.
- Died: June 26, 1962 (aged 45)
- Resting place: Forest Lawn Memorial Park in Hollywood Hills, California
- Occupation(s): Screenwriter, director, actor
- Spouse: Maurita Gilbert Jackson Pittman (married 1952)
- Children: Robert John Pittman; Sherry Jackson (stepdaughter)

Montgomery Pittman (March 1, 1917 – June 26, 1962) was an American television writer, director, and actor who was also the stepfather of actress Sherry Jackson. Among his notable credits are his work writing and directing various episodes of The Twilight Zone, Maverick and 77 Sunset Strip.

== Early years ==
According to his own account in the 1950s, Pittman was born in Louisiana in 1917 and reared in Arkansas. This is verified by his California death certificate, Social Security records, and other official documents.

== Career ==
Pittman left home and joined a carnival as a snake oil salesman. He eventually made his way to New York City, hoping for at least a small Broadway role. There he met actor Steve Cochran, who hired him as caretaker of his Los Angeles home around 1950.

In Los Angeles he tried to break into acting, getting small, mostly uncredited film and TV roles through 1951 and '52. Around this time, Cochran introduced Pittman to Maurita Gilbert Jackson, the widowed mother of three child actors: Curtis Jr., Gary, and Sherry Jackson. A romance developed, and in 1952 Pittman married Maurita Jackson in a small ceremony on June 4 in Torrance, California, with Sherry serving as flower girl and younger brother Gary as ring-bearer; Cochran himself was Pittman's best man. Approximately a year later, stepdaughter Sherry would land the role of Terry Williams on the sitcom Make Room For Daddy, which would last for five years and give her a measure of stardom.

By 1954, Pittman had turned from acting to screenwriting, sometimes writing material in which he could play small guest roles. He began with anthology shows such as Four Star Playhouse and Schlitz Playhouse, and at that time was billed as Monte Pittman.

In 1955 Cochran hired Pittman to write his next film, Come Next Spring, the first that Cochran produced himself. Sherry played the part of Cochran's mute daughter Annie Ballot, a role Pittman wrote specifically for his step-daughter.

By this point, Pittman's writing career moved into higher gear, as he started working as a writer for ABC/Warner Brothers TV shows such as 77 Sunset Strip, Sugarfoot, Maverick, Cheyenne, Surfside 6, and Colt .45. He also wrote for NBC's The Deputy, and CBS's The Twilight Zone.

By 1958 (and now consistently billed as Montgomery Pittman) he had also branched into directing for television, in addition to continuing his work as a writer and actor. Pittman often directed his own scripts, as well as scripts by other writers.

Pittman frequently cast his stepdaughter Sherry Jackson in television episodes he wrote and/or directed. Jackson appeared in episodes of 77 Sunset Strip, The Rifleman, Surfside 6 and The Twilight Zone that were both written and directed by Pittman, as well as episodes of Maverick and Riverboat that Pittman wrote but did not direct.

Montgomery and Maurita's son, Robert John Pittman, was born in 1956. Robert John also had a brief career as a child actor, debuting on a Montgomery Pittman-directed episode of 77 Sunset Strip in 1960 before settling into a recurring role on Dennis The Menace as Dennis' friend Seymour Williams.

Although he continued his occasional acting career, Pittman himself never appeared as an actor in a TV episode he directed.

Montgomery Pittman died of cancer at age 45, and he is interred at Forest Lawn Memorial Park in the Hollywood Hills.

== See also ==
- Sherry Jackson
