= Bob Sweeney (actor and director) =

American television director and actor

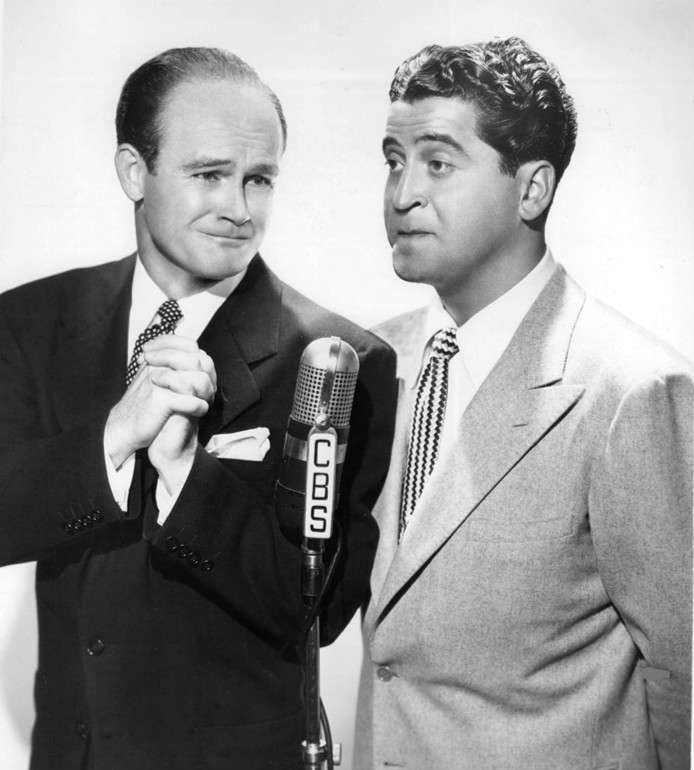
- Sweeney with Hal March (right) in 1946
- Born: October 19, 1918; San Francisco, California, U.S.
- Died: June 7, 1992 (aged 73); Westlake Village, California, U.S.
- Occupations: Actor, director and producer
- Years active: 1944–1992
- Spouse: Bev Sweeney
- Children: 1

Bob Sweeney (October 19, 1918 – June 7, 1992) was an American actor, director and producer of radio, television and film.

== Early years ==
Bob Sweeney was a graduate of San Francisco State College. In the early part of World War II, he and college classmate George Fenneman formed a stand-up comedy team and entertained troops at military bases.

== Early career on radio and television ==
From 1944 through 1948 Sweeney teamed with comedy partner Hal March in The Bob Sweeney-Hal March Show on CBS Radio. He went on to appear as a supporting character in various sitcoms in the early days of television including the role of Gilmore Cobb in the television version of My Favorite Husband (1953–54) with co-stars Joan Caulfield and Barry Nelson. Sweeney made appearances on Our Miss Brooks during its last two seasons of production (1955–1956) working alongside Eve Arden, Gale Gordon, and Richard Crenna.

From 1956 to 1957, Sweeney starred with Gordon in the TV sitcom The Brothers. In 1959, he landed the lead role on the short-lived NBC television series Fibber McGee and Molly opposite Cathy Lewis. Unlike its radio counterpart, Fibber McGee failed on television and was cancelled after less than one season. During that same season, Sweeney directed the 18-week NBC sitcom Love and Marriage set in Tin Pan Alley of New York City. His co-stars were William Demarest, Stubby Kaye, Jeanne Bal, and Murray Hamilton. He was the principle guest star on The Rifleman in the episode "The Pitch" which aired Oct. 18, 1960.

== Movie roles ==
Sweeney's film credits as an actor include the role of the undertaker in John Ford's The Last Hurrah (1958), as manipulative circus manager Harry Tupper in the Disney film Toby Tyler (1960), and as a humorously aggressive IRS agent Mr. Harker in another Disney film, Son of Flubber (1963). Sweeney also appeared as Cousin Bob in Alfred Hitchcock's Marnie (1964).

== Directing and producing ==
Sweeney is best known for his successes as a television director and producer, most notably as the director of 102 episodes of The Andy Griffith Show and as producer and/or director of episodes of several other highly successful TV series including That Girl, Hawaii Five-O, The Love Boat, Matlock, Hogan's Heroes, and Dynasty. He also directed Gene Evans's unsuccessful 1976 CBS adventure series, Spencer's Pilots. He also directed Accidental Family. Sweeney was nominated for an Emmy Award once for The Love Boat (1983).

== Personal details ==
Sweeney and his wife, Bev, had one child, a daughter, Bridget.

== Death ==
Sweeney died of cancer in Westlake Village, California, on June 7, 1992.

== Filmography ==
Year	Title	Role	Notes
1952	It Grows on Trees	McGuire	
1953	South Sea Woman	Defense Lieutenant Miller	
1954	A Christmas Carol	Bob Cratchitt	
1953	Mister Scoutmaster	Mr. Hackett	Uncredited
1958	The Last Hurrah	Johnny Degnan	
1960	Alfred Hitchcock Presents	William Spengler	Season 5 Episode 36: "Letter of Credit"
1960	Toby Tyler	Harry Tupper	
1961	A Raisin in the Sun	Insurance Company Agent	Uncredited
1962	Moon Pilot	Senator Henry McGuire	
1963	Son of Flubber	Mr. Harker	
1964	Marnie	Cousin Bob	
1978	The Irishman	Nat Simpson	
1990	Book of Love	Mr. Snow	
1991	Born to Ride	Gus, Owner of Gus's Garage	(final film role)
