= The Man Trap =

- Star Trek: The Original Series episode
- Spock and Kirk about to take Crater captive
- Episode no.: Season 1 Episode 1
- Directed by: Marc Daniels
- Written by: George Clayton Johnson
- Cinematography by: Jerry Finnerman
- Production code: 6
- Original air dates: September 6, 1966 (Canada); September 8, 1966 (US)

Guest appearances
- Jeanne Bal – Nancy Crater; Alfred Ryder – Professor Robert Crater; Michael Zaslow – Darnell

Episode chronology
← Previous —	Next → "Charlie X"
- Star Trek: The Original Series season 1

"The Man Trap" is the first episode of the American science fiction television series Star Trek to be broadcast. It aired on NBC on September 8, 1966. Set in the 23rd century, the series follows the adventures of Captain James T. Kirk (William Shatner) and his crew aboard the Starfleet starship USS Enterprise. In this episode, the crew visit an outpost to conduct medical exams on the residents, only to be attacked by a shapeshifting alien creature seeking to extract salt from their bodies. "The Man Trap" was written by George Clayton Johnson and directed by Marc Daniels.

The story—part of the original Star Trek pitch by series creator Gene Roddenberry—was first assigned to Lee Erwin. Johnson took on the writing duties after Roddenberry disliked his work on another plot proposal. Johnson's first draft was titled "Damsel With a Dulcimer", incorporating elements from his Twilight Zone episode "The Four of Us Are Dying". Roddenberry, producer Robert H. Justman and story editor John D. F. Black all tweaked elements of the episode, including the title. "The Man Trap" was the sixth episode to be filmed, but the first to be shot to schedule. Prop creator Wah Chang and costume designer William Ware Theiss created the creature.

The episode was chosen as the first of the series to be broadcast by the studio due to the horror-based plot. "The Man Trap" placed first in the timeslot with a Nielsen rating of 25.2 percent for the first half-hour and 24.2 for the remainder. After broadcast, reviewers criticized the levels of violence, but praised the acting. More recent appraisals have been mixed; praise has been given to the plot and diverse cast, but Hollywood.com listed it as among the worst episodes of the series. The creature has been dubbed the "salt vampire" by fans; it was redesigned for possible inclusion in the 2009 film Star Trek, but was not used.

== Plot ==
The USS Enterprise arrives at planet M-113 to provide supplies and medical exams for the only known inhabitants of the planet, Professor Robert Crater (Alfred Ryder) and his wife Nancy (Jeanne Bal), who operate an archaeological research station there. Captain Kirk, Chief Medical Officer Dr. Leonard McCoy, and Crewman Darnell (Michael Zaslow) transport to the surface as Kirk teases McCoy about his affection for Nancy ten years earlier. They arrive in the research station, and each of the three men sees Nancy differently: McCoy as she was when he first met her, Kirk as she should look accounting for her age, and Darnell as an attractive blonde woman whom he met on a pleasure planet. When Nancy goes out to fetch her husband, she beckons Darnell to follow her.

Professor Crater is reluctant to be examined, telling Kirk that they only require salt tablets. Before McCoy can complete the examination, they hear a scream from outside. They find Darnell dead, with red ring-like mottling on his face, a plant root in his mouth, and Nancy standing over him saying she was unable to stop Darnell from tasting the plant. On board Enterprise, Spock analyzes the plant. He confirms that it is poisonous, but that mottling is not a symptom. McCoy conducts a medical exam and, together with Spock, determines that all the salt was drained from Darnell's body. In response, Kirk transports back down to the planet with McCoy and two crewmen, Green (Bruce Watson) and Sturgeon (John Arndt). Kirk tells Professor Crater that he and his wife should stay aboard the Enterprise until they find out what killed Darnell. Crater then runs off trying to find Nancy. Nancy kills both Sturgeon and Green; their faces show the same mottling as Darnell. Nancy assumes the form of Green, and meets Kirk and McCoy. They beam back up to the ship with Sturgeon's body.

"Green" roams the corridors, stalking several crew members, killing one. It takes the form of McCoy after confirming that the real McCoy has taken a sedative to sleep. Meanwhile, Spock confirms that scans show only one person, Crater, on the planet; Kirk and Spock beam down to capture him. They find Green's body before Crater tries to frighten them away with phaser fire. After they stun him with a phaser beam, the dazed Crater reveals that the real Nancy was killed by the creature – the last member of a long-dead civilization of shape-shifters who feed on salt – a year earlier. The creature continued to take on the appearance of Nancy out of affection for Crater, and he has been feeding it, comparing it to the "now-extinct buffalo". Kirk informs Enterprise of the creature's intrusion, as the landing party and Crater transport back to the ship.

Crater refuses to help them identify the creature, so Kirk orders the fake "McCoy" to administer truth serum. Kirk arrives in sickbay to find Crater dead and Spock injured; Spock's Vulcan blood made him incompatible with the creature's needs. Back in its "Nancy" form, the creature goes to McCoy's quarters. Kirk arrives with salt tablets to lure the creature and a phaser if he provokes the creature into attacking. McCoy hesitates, giving the creature the opportunity to feed on the salt tablets and boosting its energy. It attacks Kirk. Spock arrives and goes hand to hand against the creature, who retaliates, slapping him against the wall. The creature reverts to its natural appearance and starts to feed on Kirk as McCoy, stunned, stares in disbelief. Once Kirk screams, McCoy opens fire with his phaser. The creature changes back into the shape of "Nancy" to plead for its life. McCoy asks forgiveness, then fires again, killing it. As Enterprise leaves orbit, Kirk comments to Spock that he was thinking about the buffalo.

== Production ==
=== Writing ===
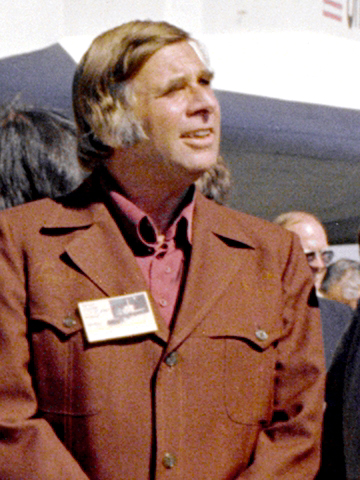
"The Man Trap" originated in the first pitch for Star Trek by Gene Roddenberry (pictured).

"The Man Trap" appeared in Gene Roddenberry's original pitch for Star Trek as the title of a show with a different plot: the crew face several apparitions that are "wish-fulfilment traps which become as real as flesh and blood"; the traps increase in subtlety until the crew struggle to differentiate between apparition and reality. Lee Erwin, who had previously worked on The Lieutenant with Roddenberry, was commissioned to produce a treatment; an outline featuring a salt-devouring vampire was handed in on April 8, 1966. Meanwhile, George Clayton Johnson had been assigned a storyline, tentatively titled "Chicago II", in which the crew of the Enterprise visit a planet where the culture was that of 1920s mob-era Chicago, which later evolved into "A Piece of the Action". Johnson was hired after story editor John D. F. Black recommended him to the producers. Johnson decided to use the 1953 science fiction novel The Syndic by Cyril M. Kornbluth as the basis for the story. Roddenberry felt that Johnson's treatment did not match his vision for Star Trek, but did not want to lose him entirely, and asked him to write "The Man Trap". (Note: This idea was later revisited by David P. Harmon and Gene L. Coon, being written as "Mission into Chaos" and filmed as "A Piece of the Action".) Erwin was paid in full for his version, and given a separate "kill fee" because it would not be used. (Note: Erwin went on to write the third season episode "Whom Gods Destroy".)

Roddenberry wanted to see more action, so the creature's ability to create apparitions was added to the script from the original pitch. Stan Robertson at NBC suggested to Roddenberry that they might wish to get medical advice over whether the draining of a chemical from a person would kill them instantly. To find out, Roddenberry asked Kellam de Forest Research, who said that, while it had never happened in reality, a quick death would be likely. Johnson suggested that the creature in "The Man Trap" could be the last of its species. He compared its situation to the reduction in numbers of American bison. Roddenberry found the idea intriguing.

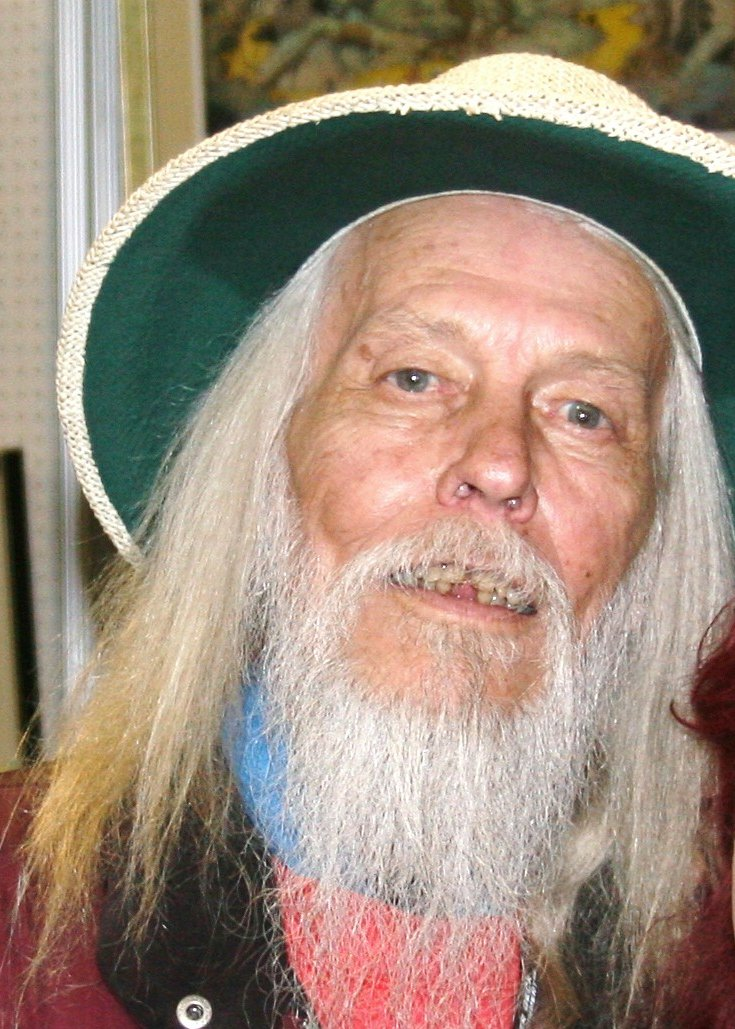
Writer George Clayton Johnson in 2006. "The Man Trap" was his only Star Trek credit.

Erwin was paid a further fee to terminate his contract, and Johnson wrote a first draft teleplay titled "Damsel With a Dulcimer." While writing, Johnson consulted Black, who advised him to place the creature on the Enterprise quickly to increase the pace of the episode. This draft was delivered on May 23, but NBC felt that hallucinations were being overused; the same plot device had appeared in the pilot episode "The Cage". Johnson wrote a further draft on May 31, which reduced the number of apparitions, and was well received by Robert H. Justman. Roddenberry and Justman made further tweaks; one was to restore the name "The Man Trap" from Erwin's original treatment, and another removed a scene which introduced McCoy's apprehension when using the transporter. Johnson further edited the script, but complained about the change in name. After a second edit by Johnson, it was passed from Justman to story editor Black. While the former felt that the script still needed work, Black felt it was nearly ready. Following Black's review, Roddenberry re-wrote the script between June 16 and 21. Johnson felt this re-write had "downgrad[ed] the story."

Black later said that Roddenberry removed a large part of Johnson's work, and that Johnson's original work was better than Roddenberry's edited version. Johnson was pleased with the final episode, although he was concerned that viewers might not understand Star Trek after watching "The Man Trap" owing to differences in characterization between this episode and the rest of the series. He admitted that he did not like Spock and was concerned that the character would not be understood after this episode. Roddenberry was pleased with Johnson's work, and offered him further writing work on "What Are Little Girls Made Of?", which had been written by Robert Bloch. Roddenberry only wanted Johnson to "polish" the script; Johnson, feeling he was unable to improve it without starting from scratch, turned down the offer, but expressed the desire to work on the show again. He later wrote a story outline titled "Rock-A-Bye Baby, or Die!" in which the Enterprise would have become a childlike sentient being who idolizes Kirk as its father. This was not commissioned, so "The Man Trap" was Johnson's only work on the franchise.

=== Guest appearances ===
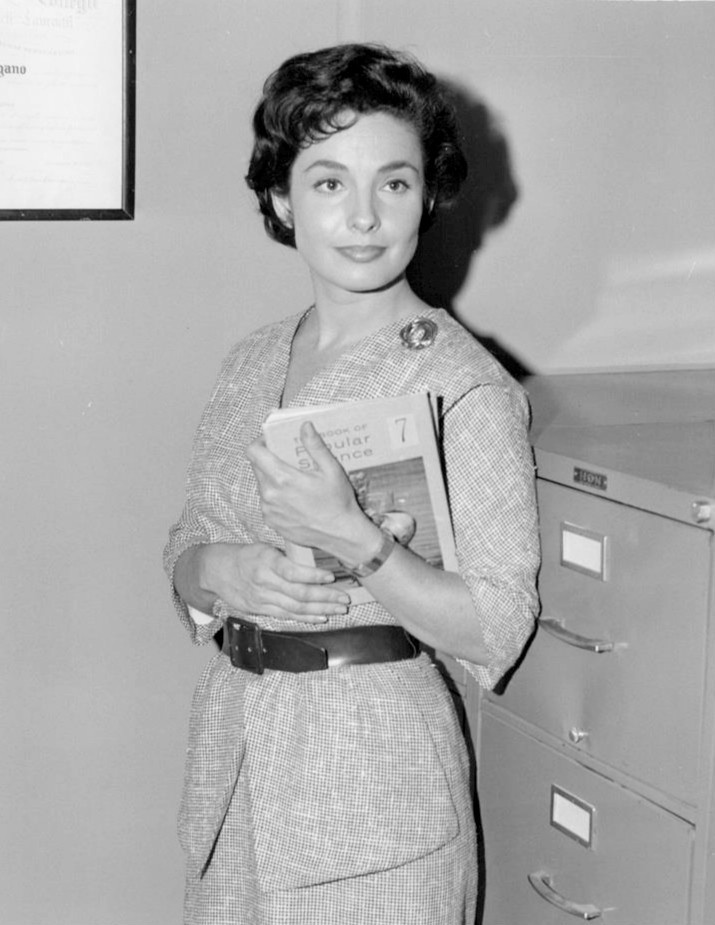
Jeanne Bal (pictured in a promotional picture for Mr. Novak) portrayed Nancy Crater, whose image the creature copied in this episode.

Jeanne Bal was cast as Nancy Crater, McCoy's former love interest; the actress had previously guest-starred in Perry Mason and was one of the main performers in the sitcom Love and Marriage. Alfred Ryder was well known for his numerous appearances in similar genre series such as The Wild Wild West and The Outer Limits. After his appearance as Robert Crater in "The Man Trap", he appeared in the science fiction series The Invaders.

Actors playing two of the crewmen who died on screen later appeared in other episodes of Star Trek. Michael Zaslow, seen in "The Man Trap" as Darnell, appeared in "I, Mudd", and later had a long-running role in the soap opera Guiding Light as Roger Thorpe. John Arndt appeared in four further episodes of the original series.

=== Direction and filming ===
All previous episodes of Star Trek had overrun their filming schedules, and the producers were concerned that not enough time had been allotted to each production. Marc Daniels was recruited as director of "The Man Trap"; among his varied directing credits were episodes of I Love Lucy for Desilu Productions. Pre-production began during the six scheduled filming days for "The Enemy Within", but that episode ran long. Filming for "The Man Trap" commenced around 3:20 p.m. on June 22 and continued until 7:10 p.m. Several futuristic-looking salt shakers were sourced for scenes in "The Man Trap", but due to concerns that they would not be recognized, they were instead used from "The Man Trap" onward as McCoy's tools in sickbay.

The first full day of filming on June 23 was predominantly shot on the set representing the bridge of the Enterprise. Two small establishing shots were postponed until the filming of the next episode. The following day, corridor scenes were filmed, as was the climactic scene featuring the creature's death. At that point, Daniels estimated that he was only a third of a day behind schedule. After a break for the weekend, production resumed on June 27 for scenes in the botany lab, the briefing room and sickbay. One of Grace Lee Whitney's favorite sets to work on throughout the series was the lab, which was the sickbay redecorated, as she enjoyed working with George Takei. The animated plant in that scene was a hand puppet controlled from under the table, and Whitney later recalled that the operator could see right up her skirt throughout the shoot and would occasionally try to grope her using the puppet.

For the sickbay scenes when Spock bleeds, Daniels decided that Vulcans should have green blood. Roddenberry disliked the idea and unsuccessfully attempted to have it corrected in post-production. By the end of the fifth day of shooting, Daniels estimated that he was now only half an hour behind schedule. Days six and seven were spent on the sets used to show the surface of M-113; while the design of the planet did not match Johnson's vision, he was pleased with it nonetheless. The ruins were constructed out of cardboard boxes covered in gunite (a spray-on, cement-like product) to give them a rocky appearance. Production wrapped on June 30, at 2:55 p.m. Bob Justman later referred to Daniels as the "savior" of the series for delivering "The Man Trap" on schedule, and when the director for "The Naked Time" dropped out, Daniels took over and shot the episode back to back with "The Man Trap" a quarter of a day faster than the schedule. By the end of the original series, Daniels had filmed more episodes than any other director.

During the production of "The Man Trap", Daniels introduced a system in which actors unneeded on a shoot went to a "cast table" area to practice upcoming scenes rather than return to their dressing rooms. Producers felt that this both sped up the filming process and improved the quality of performances. The cast table system continued to be used throughout the production of the original series, even when Daniels was not directing.

In post-production, Justman recommended adding an opening narration. Roddenberry agreed and wrote new lines for a Captain's log. Alexander Courage recorded the music for this episode on August 19, the same day as the "Theme from Star Trek", using a 25-piece orchestra. While Roddenberry liked the theme, he hated the music created specifically for "The Man Trap". The optical effects were created more quickly than usual; Howard A. Anderson, Jr. took two months, three times faster than for some episodes. The overall production costs for "The Man Trap" came in under-budget at $185,401.

=== The creature ===
The producers spent some time considering the creature's appearance. Justman suggested to Gene Roddenberry that it could be some sort of "terrifying, young lady" with a similar appearance to the green skinned Orion slave girl seen in "The Cage", but blue skinned and with orange hair. While Roddenberry thought that the idea was good, he already had an agreement with NBC that it would be an animal. Johnson envisaged the creature as a refugee with "ashen skin" wearing "gunnysack clothing". Daniels had some apprehension about using a monster-of-the-week format, asking "Do you go for cheap thrills or a more intelligent approach?" He said that the crew decided to "treat everything as if it were real" in order to help the audience buy into it. It was Johnson who suggested the creature should be a shapeshifter, having used the idea in an episode of The Twilight Zone he wrote called "The Four of Us Are Dying".

The creature was designed by Wah Chang. Dancer Sandra Gimpel wore the costume on-screen. Gimpel had previously appeared as a Talosian in "The Cage". The head of the creature costume was sculpted in clay, then covered in a plaster cast. Once the cast was removed, liquid latex was applied to create a flexible single-piece mask, which was then painted. Chang added a white wig and attached glass lenses to the mask for eyes. Once Gimpel was wearing the mask, cuts were made into its wrinkles to offer the actress some limited vision while wearing it. Gloves were modified by Chang to give the fingers the appearance of tentacles with suction cups. William Ware Theiss created the rest of the costume out of a fur bodysuit.

Johnson praised both Chang and Gimpel, saying that while the latter embodied the character, the design work meant that, in the final scene, it was as if the crew had to kill a "helpless dog". After filming, the costume was kept in Justman's office, becoming the first in an ever-growing number of alien costumes accumulated there. It reappeared on-screen in "The Squire of Gothos". Although referred to officially as the "M-113 creature", during production it was called the "salt sucker" and fans of the show have taken to referring to the alien as the "salt vampire".

==== Later appearances ====
A new version of the creature was designed by Don Lanning for the 2009 film Star Trek, but it wasn't used, which pleased Lanning. The creature did return in Star Trek Online, a massively multiplayer online role-playing game. Rather than a single salt vampire, the 20-player PvE mission "Mine Trap" saw a Romulan colony overrun with them. A salt vampire also makes an appearance in an episode of the animated series Star Trek: Lower Decks. In December 2019, an animated version of the creature made a brief appearance in the opening scenes of the Star Trek: Short Treks episode "Ephraim and Dot".

== Themes ==
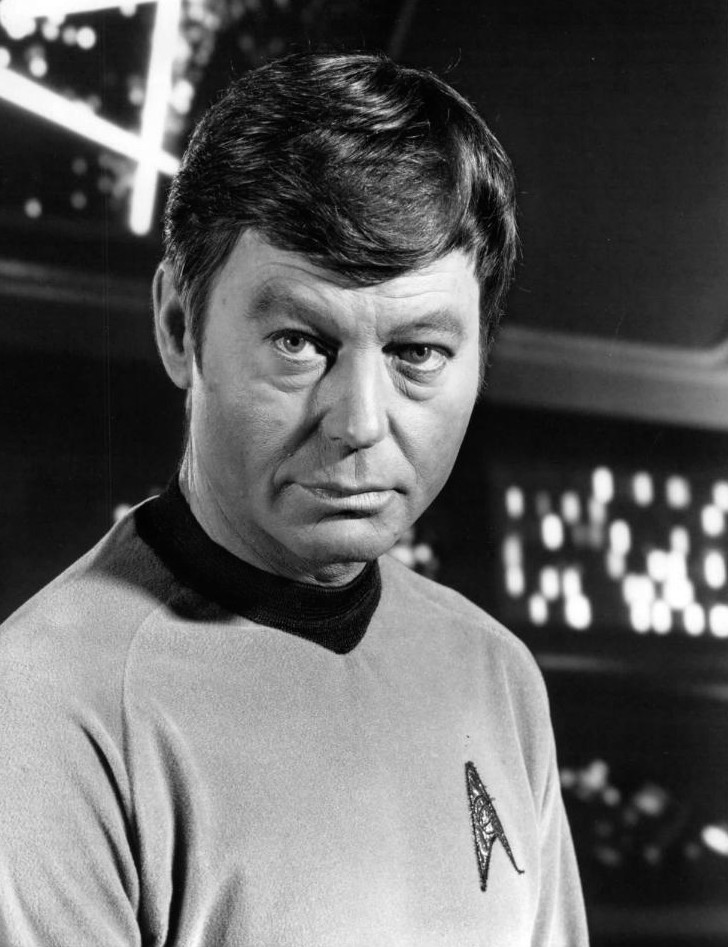
Paula M. Block and Terry J. Erdmann wrote that Dr. McCoy (pictured) would have been troubled for some time after the death of the creature at his hands.

In his book The Influence of Star Trek on Television, Film and Culture, Lincoln Geraghty wrote that episodes such as "The Man Trap" demonstrated a recurring theme within the series: the more barren the planet, the more likely that characters will be in danger. Other episodes which he said supported this view included "The Cage" and "What Are Little Girls Made Of?" Geraghty also pointed out that elsewhere in the original series, the predominant view was that alien predators such as the salt vampire were a lower life form which should be destroyed. He said that in "The Man Trap", the alternative argument is presented: that such creatures should not be killed. However, Geraghty felt that the writers tried to prevent viewers from feeling sympathy for the creature by revealing its true appearance as it died. Paula M. Block and Terry J. Erdmann also discussed the killing of the creature in their book Star Trek: The Original Series 365, saying that it was "the right thing to do", but suggested that the nature of the death would have troubled McCoy for some time after the event although this was not shown in the series.

A vampiric alien is a recurring idea in science fiction television series, such as the Blake's 7 episode "Sand", the Babylon 5 episode "Soul Hunter" and the television film Babylon 5: The River of Souls. The theme had already been used in written form, in Gustave Le Rouge's 1908 French science fiction work Le Prisonnier de la Planète Mars.

Block and Erdmann also discussed another part of the episode where Spock is in charge on the bridge and Uhura begins to flirt with him, calling it a "quintessential scene of the series" due to the characters' sexual interest in each other. They suggested this may have been the inspiration for the Spock/Uhura relationship introduced in the 2009 reboot film Star Trek. Nichelle Nichols, who played Uhura, later said that she felt there were hints of an Uhura/Spock relationship in other episodes of the original series.

== Reception ==
=== Broadcast ===
A month prior to the premiere of Star Trek, Desilu held a screening for NBC executives to help decide which episode to broadcast first, and several stories were considered. Executives were concerned that "Mudd's Women", one potential choice, would have reviewers discussing "space hookers"; they felt another possibility, "Where No Man Has Gone Before", contained too much exposition, even though it was filmed as a second pilot. The final choice was between "The Man Trap" and "The Naked Time". Justman felt that "The Naked Time" would make it easier for viewers to understand the characters, but later agreed with NBC's decision to show "The Man Trap" first. In the book Inside Star Trek: The Real Story, he suggests that it was "scarier and more exploitable than the others".

"The Man Trap" was the sixth episode produced. Although Roddenberry initially disagreed with NBC's decision, he and production executive Herbert Franklin Solow came to believe it was the correct choice. Shatner also disagreed with the network, feeling that "The Man Trap" was the worst episode out of those available. The episode was the first episode of Star Trek broadcast in the United States, on NBC on September 8, 1966. "The Man Trap" formed part of NBC's "Sneak a Peek Week", in which the network showed the premiere episodes of several new shows in prime time slots, ahead of the rival channels ABC and CBS, who were still showing repeats from the previous season. Leading into Star Trek was the first episode of Tarzan showing Ron Ely, and leading out was Richard Mulligan's The Hero.

"The Man Trap" placed first in its timeslot, with Nielsen ratings of 25.2 during the first half-hour; some 46.7 percent of all American televisions in use at the time were tuned in to the episode. In the same timeslot, The Tammy Grimes Show on ABC and My Three Sons on CBS received ratings of 14.1 and 9.4 respectively. During the second half of the episode, the rating for "The Man Trap" dropped to 24.2, with 42.2 percent of televisions tuned in. Bewitched on ABC increased that network's rating to 15.8, and CBS's Thursday night movie increased their rating to 10.7.

The following episodes saw a drop in ratings after "The Man Trap". "Charlie X" was broadcast the following week; the studio did not want that episode to run second, but "Where No Man Has Gone Before" was the only other completed story. It placed second in the timeslot during the first half hour, with a rating of 19.1 and an overall share of 35.9 percent of viewers. It was beaten by My Three Sons on CBS with a rating of 19.2. During the second half hour, Star Trek was pushed into third with a rating of 12.3 by the Thursday night movie on CBS and the season premiere of Bewitched, which was also the first episode of that series broadcast in color. The following week, with "Where No Man Has Gone Before", the series returned to the top place with a 19.9 rating during the first half hour, and second in the second half hour to Bewitched. The Trendex rating report for the first few weeks of Star Trek saw it ranked in 33rd spot for the period with an average rating of 18.7.

==== Overseas broadcasts and re-releases ====
The episode was not the first to be broadcast in the United Kingdom, which instead premiered Star Trek on BBC1 with "Where No Man Has Gone Before" on July 12, 1969. The episodes continued to be broadcast in a different order than they had appeared in the United States. "The Man Trap" was shown nearly three months later on October 4 as the 13th episode. This was during the period when the channel was still broadcasting only in black and white; it was not until "Arena" on November 15 that the series was shown in color. During subsequent repeats of Star Trek, the channel reverted to NBC's schedule and showed "The Man Trap" as the first episode. Canadian network CTV aired episodes of the first season of Star Trek on Tuesday nights instead of Thursdays and so ran "The Man Trap" on September 6, 1966, two days before NBC. Airing American programs early was a common practice among Canadian broadcasters in order to avoid direct competition for viewers and advertisers with American border stations airing the same program at the same time. The practice became obsolete once simultaneous substitution of commercials was permitted.

A high-definition remastering of "The Man Trap", which introduced new special effects and starship exteriors as well as enhanced music and audio, was shown for the first time in the United States on September 29, 2007, in broadcast syndication. The episode was made available to over 200 local stations across the United States with the rights to broadcast Star Trek.

=== Critical reception ===
In 1966, The Hollywood Reporter said the episode was a "winner", with a lot of suspense and science fiction gadgets. In an interview published in the 1988 book The Star Trek Interview Book, Johnson claimed that the response of critics to "The Man Trap", and the initial episodes of Star Trek in general, was "complete bewilderment". Stating that "its special effects weren't very special", Bob Shiels of the Calgary Herald concluded "We were told that the voyage of the Enterprise is programmed to last five years but there appears to be no reason for keeping Star Trek around that long". Shiels preferred the also debuting Love on a Rooftop which, unlike Star Trek, provided background so viewers understood "what the show is supposed to be all about". In previewing the broadcast of "The Man Trap", The Daily Reporter said that Star Trek had the "usual far-fetched suppositions" present in other science fiction works, but praise was given to the acting skills of Shatner and the plots of the initial episodes. The Edwardsville Intelligencer called the reveal of the creature in the episode "the kicker of a great sci-fi plot". Daily Variety columnist Jack Hellman gave the episode an unfavorable review over its "lack of meaningful cast leads", who "move around with directorial precision with only violence to provide the excitement." The weekly edition of the magazine offered a similar opinion, stating that the Enterprise "trudged along for a long hour with hardly any relief from violence, killing, ugly stuff and a distasteful monster".

Among more recent reviews, Zack Handlen of The A.V. Club gave the episode an "A−" rating, describing it as "done very well" with a plot that is dark and ambiguous. Torrie Atkinson and Eugene Myers reviewed the episode in 2009 for Tor.com, saying that it suitably introduced the characters, although certain elements of the show were not yet in place. These included the lack of the death of a redshirted character, as the crewmen who died in "The Man Trap" did not wear red shirts, along with the lack of red and yellow alerts, instead referred to as general quarters three and four in this episode. The duo added that the episode demonstrated that the series was "something special", and that it remained more culturally diverse than modern television. They gave it a rating of four out of six.

Ryan Britt, also writing for Tor.com, said that "The Man Trap" was not a good introduction to the series, but praised the screen time given to Rand, Uhura and Sulu. He added that the latter two were more interesting in this episode than they would be at any point until the start of the movie franchise. Britt said that "The Man Trap" was different from the rest of the series, and more akin to The Twilight Zone owing to the background of the writer. In Hollywood.com's ranking of all 79 episodes of The Original Series, Christian Blauvelt placed "The Man Trap" as 73rd, calling the creature "incredibly pointless". It was also listed as one of the show's "cheesiest classic creatures" by Wired magazine in 2007; however, Rolling Stone magazine listed it as the tenth best villain in the franchise.

== Home media release and other adaptations ==
The first adaptation of "The Man Trap" was as a re-working into a short story by author James Blish as part of the novelization Star Trek. This book contained seven short stories, each based on an episode of The Original Series, and was published in January 1967. The adaptation of "The Man Trap" appeared as the third story in the book, although it was named "The Unreal McCoy". The first home media release of "The Man Trap" was on Compact Cassette from Startone Productions in 1982. A further release on LaserDisc took place in 1985, alongside "Charlie X". Further releases of all episodes of the series were made on VHS and Betamax.

The episode was released on DVD paired with "The Naked Time" as part of the general release of the series in 1999. There were no other extras added to that series of releases, except the DVD containing "Turnabout Intruder". (Note: This featured two versions of the original Star Trek pilot, "The Cage".) "The Man Trap" was later released within a DVD box set of the first season in 2004; all three seasons of The Original Series were released as full-season box sets that year. The episode was included in the remastered season one release on DVD and Blu-ray in 2009.
