= Robert H. Justman =

American television producer (1926–2008)

- Born: Robert Harris Justman; July 13, 1926; New York City
- Died: May 28, 2008 (aged 81); Los Angeles
- Occupation: Television producer
- Spouse: Jacqueline Justman
- Children: Jennifer, Jonathan, and William

Robert Harris Justman (July 13, 1926 – May 28, 2008) was an American television producer, director, and production manager. He worked on many American TV series including Lassie, The Life of Riley, Adventures of Superman, The Outer Limits, Star Trek, Mission: Impossible, Search, and Then Came Bronson.

== Career ==
Born to a Jewish family in New York City, Justman was one of the pioneers behind Star Trek, working both as an associate and supervising producer on Star Trek: The Original Series and Star Trek: The Next Generation. He was also the assistant director of the first two Star Trek episodes: "The Cage" and "Where No Man Has Gone Before." During Star Trek: The Original Series, he served as Gene Roddenberry's right-hand man, who managed the show along with John D. F. Black, Herbert F. Solow, D.C. Fontana, and Gene L. Coon. Justman was reportedly the first to call Gene Roddenberry "The Great Bird of the Galaxy," drawn from a throwaway line from the original series episode "The Man Trap".

Justman served as associate producer of Star Trek during its first two seasons, and was promoted to co-producer at the start of the third before resigning, partly due to exhaustion, and partly due to his displeasure with the decline in quality of the series, as well as what he considered its poor treatment by Paramount, the new owner of the studio. Paramount radically reduced the production budget during its third season.

Justman's motion picture credits as an assistant director included The Big Combo (1955), Kiss Me Deadly (1955), The Big Knife (1955), Attack (1956), and Mutiny on the Bounty (1962).

Justman also appeared in front of the camera once as an actor, playing the "Elder of Luminos" in "A Feasibility Study", a 1964 episode of The Outer Limits. His name also became the name of a shuttlecraft in Star Trek: The Next Generation.

Along with Herbert F. Solow, Justman wrote the book Inside Star Trek: The Real Story, published by Pocket Books in 1996. According to Publishers Weekly, "As told by Solow, Star Trek's co-producer [sic], and Justman, the executive in charge of production [sic], this is arguably the definitive history of the TV show...With plenty of behind-the-scenes material that will be of interest to Trek fans, this book puts a good deal of emphasis on the show's business side, elucidating production difficulties, cost overruns, and the seemingly constant debate with NBC over the show's future." (Publishers Weekly inadvertently gave Solow's title to Justman and vice versa.)

== Death ==
Justman died on May 28, 2008, in Los Angeles from the complications of severe Parkinson's disease.
