= Herbert F. Solow =

American television producer (1930–2020)

Herbert Franklin Solow
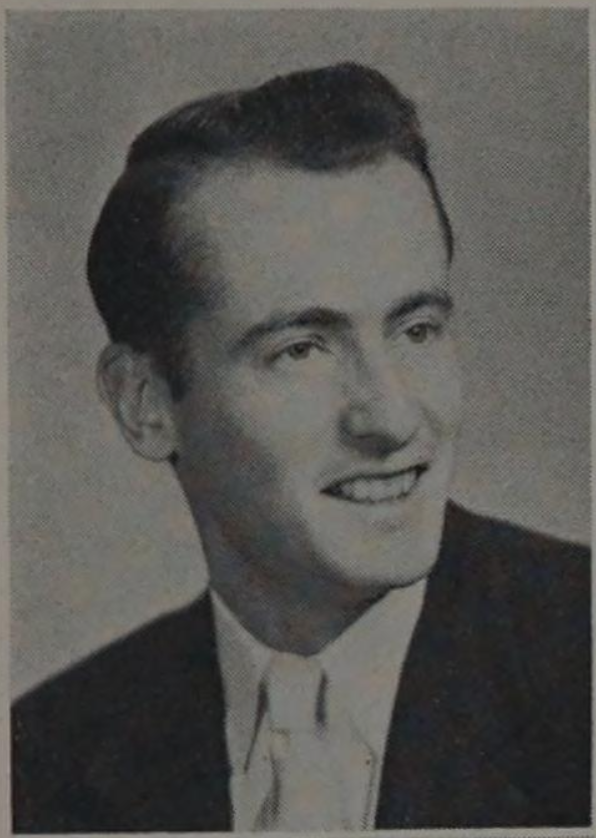
- Solow, c. 1952-1953
- Born: December 14, 1930; New York City
- Died: November 19, 2020 (aged 89); Malibu, California
- Occupations: Television writer and producer Screenwriter
- Spouse: Yvonne Fern (aka Harrison Solow)

Herbert Franklin Solow (December 14, 1930 – November 19, 2020) was an American motion picture and television executive, screenwriter, motion picture and television producer, director and talent agent.

== Biography ==
Solow was born to a Jewish family in New York City. After his graduation from Dartmouth College in 1953, Solow was hired by the William Morris Agency in New York City to work in the mailroom. In 1954, he was promoted to talent agent. Later he was hired by NBC and transferred to Los Angeles in 1960 and was subsequently hired by CBS as Director of Daytime Programs, West Coast. He returned to NBC a year later as Director of Daytime Programs.

=== The middle 1960s: Desilu before the Paramount merger ===
In 1964, he joined Desilu Studios and was appointed Vice President of Production in 1964. Solow oversaw the development, sales, and production of Star Trek, Mission: Impossible, and Mannix. Solow said that Gene Roddenberry's initial treatment for Star Trek was much like other science-fiction shows that had come before, but what made the series treatment unique was the use of nautical terms such as "Yeoman" and "Ensign." As Solow and Roddenberry worked to develop the series idea, it was Solow's suggestion that each episode should be treated as an event that had happened in the past, and Solow suggested the use of the "Captain's Log" as a mechanism to bring the viewer up-to-date.

=== At MGM ===
Solow joined MGM Television as vice president in charge of television production. There he oversaw the development and production of Medical Center, Then Came Bronson (produced by Robert H. Justman and Robert Sabaroff), and The Courtship of Eddie's Father. Later, Solow was appointed MGM's Vice President of Worldwide Television and Motion Picture Production, and headed MGM Studios in Culver City, California, and Borehamwood, England.

=== Later work ===
After he left MGM, he joined Hanna-Barbera to start a primetime production unit, before spinning it out in 1976. Solow was the executive producer of the short-lived NBC TV series Man from Atlantis (packaged by his own production company, which was owned by Taft Broadcasting) and produced the award-winning feature-length documentary Elvis: That's the Way It Is, starring Elvis Presley.

Along with Robert H. Justman, he wrote Inside Star Trek: The Real Story, published by Pocket Books in 1996. According to Publishers Weekly, "As told by Solow, Star Trek's executive in charge of production, and Justman, Star Trek's co-producer, this is arguably the definitive history of the TV show ... With plenty of behind-the-scenes material that will be of interest to Trek fans, this book puts a good deal of emphasis on the show's business side, elucidating production difficulties, cost overruns and the seemingly constant debate with NBC over the show's future." Although Solow is often credited with being the first to call Gene Roddenberry "The Great Bird of the Galaxy", drawn from one of George Takei's throwaway lines, as Mr. Sulu, from the original series episode "The Man Trap", it was actually Robert Justman who coined the phrase. Solow thought the name was silly.

== Personal life and death ==
Solow was married to Yvonne Fern Solow, a.k.a. Dr. Harrison Solow, who wrote the book, Gene Roddenberry: The Last Conversation (1994). By 2005, Solow and his wife were living in southwest Wales, where he was a part-time lecturer at the media department of the then University of Wales, Lampeter. During her time at Lampeter, Yvonne (Harrison) Solow became Writer-in-Residence and learned Welsh. They returned to Malibu, California, in 2009.

Solow died on November 19, 2020, at the age of 89. He is survived by three daughters and one grandson.

== Affiliations ==
Solow was a member of the Writers Guild of America, the Directors Guild of America and the Academy of Motion Picture Arts and Sciences (AMPAS) and served on the Foreign Film, Documentary, and Special Effects Committees of AMPAS.
