= Hitter (disambiguation) =

A hitter is a player batting in baseball.

- Designated hitter
- Pinch hitter
- Switch hitter

The Hitter may refer to:

- The Hitter (film)
- "The Hitter", song by Bruce Springsteen from Devils & Dust
