= Nothing in the Dark =

- The Twilight Zone episode
- Episode no.: Season 3 Episode 16
- Directed by: Lamont Johnson
- Written by: George Clayton Johnson
- Production code: 3652
- Original air date: January 5, 1962

Guest appearances
- Gladys Cooper; Robert Redford; R. G. Armstrong

Episode chronology
| ← Previous "A Quality of Mercy" | Next → "One More Pallbearer" |
- The Twilight Zone (1959 TV series) (season 3)

"Nothing in the Dark" is episode 81 of the American television anthology series The Twilight Zone, originally airing on January 5, 1962. This is one of two episodes that were filmed during season two but held over for broadcast until season three, the other being "The Grave".

== Opening narration ==
An old woman living in a nightmare, an old woman who has fought a thousand battles with death and always won. Now she's faced with a grim decision—whether or not to open a door. And in some strange and frightening way she knows that this seemingly ordinary door leads to the Twilight Zone.

== Plot ==
Wanda Dunn is a frail and elderly woman who lives in a dark basement apartment in an abandoned tenement. She is awakened one morning by an altercation outside in which Harold Beldon, a young police officer, is shot and falls just outside her door. Although he cries out that he is dying and pleads for her help, Dunn is reluctant as she knows Death takes many forms and is coming to claim her life. When she eventually relents, she tells Beldon that she has no phone to call a doctor. Dunn is relieved when she touches him and does not die, which convinces her that he cannot possibly be Death.

While inside, she explains her reluctance to help him, describing how she saw Death in the form of a man take an old woman's life just by touching her. She says that she has seen death many times since then with different faces. Consequently, she has not left her home in years, preferring to live unhappily than not to live at all.

There is a knock at the door, and Harold persuades Wanda to answer it, but when she relents the man forces the door open and she collapses from terror. When Wanda regains consciousness, the man apologizes and explains he is a building contractor and is tasked to demolish the building in an hour. He affirms that she has been given due notice, and if she will not leave he will call the police. She turns to Harold for help, but the contractor does not see him and leaves to get the authorities.

Wanda looks in a mirror and does not see Harold in the reflection; it dawns on her that Harold is Death. He explains with a friendly smile that he set up the ruse to gain her trust and convince her that he means her no harm. Wanda continues her protests, but he gently assures her she has nothing to fear and finally persuades her to give him her hand. Before she even realizes anything has changed, she finds herself standing beside her own dead body. Wanda and Harold walk arm in arm through the doorway, up the stairs, outside into the sunlight.

== Closing narration ==
There was an old woman who lived in a room. And, like all of us, was frightened of the dark. But who discovered in a minute last fragment of her life that there was nothing in the dark that wasn't there when the lights were on. Object lesson for the more frightened amongst us in or out, of the Twilight Zone.

== Cast ==
- Gladys Cooper as Wanda Dunn
- Robert Redford as Harold Beldon
- R. G. Armstrong as Contractor

== Reception ==
At the 2014 Santa Barbara International Film Festival, Redford stated he has been told by the production company of the series that it is the most often viewed episode of The Twilight Zone.

== Original Story Treatment ==
- In the original story treatment, the title is "There is Nothing in the Dark That Wasn't There When the Light Was On."
- Wanda's family name was originally "Bloor"

== Sources ==
- DeVoe, Bill. (2008). Trivia from The Twilight Zone. Albany, GA: Bear Manor Media. ISBN 978-1-59393-136-0
- Grams, Martin. (2008). The Twilight Zone: Unlocking the Door to a Television Classic. Churchville, MD: OTR Publishing. ISBN 978-0-9703310-9-0
- Johnson, George Clayton. (1996). Twilight Zone Scripts & Stories. Santa Monica, CA: Streamline Pictures Book ISBN 1-57300-055-8
