= Dorothi Fox =

American actress (1930–2026)

- Born: January 8, 1930; New York City, U.S.
- Died: March 29, 2026 (aged 96)
- Other names: Dorothy Fox, Dorothe Fox
- Occupation: Actress
- Years active: 1970–2026
- Known for: Bananas (1971); Three Days of the Condor (1975); Onion News Network (2011)

Dorothi Fox (January 8, 1930 – March 29, 2026) was an American actress who starred in television, film and on stage. Born in New York City, she started her career in African-American theatre before moving to the big screen in the 1970s appearing in blaxploitation films such as Come Back, Charleston Blue (1972) and The Wiz (1978) as well as the comedy Bananas (1971) and the political thriller Three Days of the Condor (1975). Her career continued into the 21st century with roles in television productions including the Onion News Network.

== Early life ==
Fox was born on January 8, 1930, and she hailed from the Harlem neighborhood of Manhattan.

== Career ==
Fox began her career with the Negro Ensemble Company (NEC) in 1966 as head usher. She made her debut on Broadway in “The Last of Mrs. Lincoln” by James Prideaux. She acted extensively with the New Federal Theatre of Woodie King Jr. and with numerous other theatrical troupes.

She moved to the big screen in the 1970s starring in films of the blaxploitation genre. In the 1971 comedy film Bananas she portrayed Federal Bureau of Investigation director J. Edgar Hoover disguised as a black woman.

In the 2000s she achieved fame portraying the quick-witted political commentator Nancy Fichandler in the Onion News Network. Other television roles include Random Acts of Flyness and Orange is the New Black.

In 2019, she returned to the stage with the Negro Ensemble Company in "Imminently Yours" by Karimah. The tragicomedy set in the American South follows the intergenerational experiences of an African-American family. She played the role of Lillie Mae.

== Death ==
Fox died on March 29, 2026, at the age of 96.

== Filmography ==
| Year | Title | Role | Notes |
|---|---|---|---|
| 1970 | Caught in the Middle | | TV movie |
| 1971 | Bananas | J. Edgar Hoover | Film |
| 1971 | The Gang That Couldn't Shoot Straight | Nurse | Film |
| 1972 | Come Back, Charleston Blue | Streetwalker | Film |
| 1974 | After the Fall | Carrie | Film |
| 1975 | The Happy Hooker | Rosita the Maid | Film |
| 1975 | Three Days of the Condor | Nurse | Film |
| 1976 | Dragonfly | Woman on porch | Film |
| 1978 | The Wiz | Aunt Em's Party | Film |
| 1979 | The Hitter | Mabel | Film |
| 1989 | That's Adequate | Beulah | Film |
| 1993 | Strapped | Grandmother | TV movie |
| 2004 | Mind the Gap | Grandma | Film |
| 2007–2010 | Onion News Network | Nancy Fichandler | Television series |
| 2010 | Gravity | Homeless lady | Television series |
| 2012 | The Normals | Old woman | Film |
| 2014 | The Fuzz | Chief McNair | Television series |
| 2014 | Before We Go | Woman | Film |
| 2015 | Run All Night | Nervous Old Woman | Film |
| 2016 | Orange Is the New Black | Cheeks | Television series (one Season 4 episode) |
| 2016 | Mr. Robot | Nell Romero | Television series (Eps2.1 k3rnel-pan1c.ksd) |
| 2017 | Girls | Senior citizen | Television series (one episode) |
| 2017 | Good Time | Elderly Woman in Hospital | Film |
| 2017 | Rough Night | Female clerk | Film |
| 2018 | High Maintenance | | Television series (one episode) |
| 2018 | Lez Bomb | Ronnie | Film |
| 2018 | Random Acts of Flyness | Nana | Television series (one episode) |
| 2019 | Shaft | Old lady neighbour | Television series |
| 2019 | Law & Order: Special Victims Unit | Patient | Television series (one episode) |
| 2020 | Wheels | Grandmother | Television series |
| 2020 | Inspector Ike | Esther | Television series |
| 2021 | Awkwafina Is Nora from Queens | Laurie | Television series (one episode) |
| 2021–2022 | Power Book III: Raising Kanan | Deen's grandmother | Television series (three episodes) |
