= After the Fall (1974 film) =

1974 television film

- Genre: drama
- Based on: After the Fall by Arthur Miller
- Screenplay by: Arthur Miller
- Directed by: Gilbert Cates
- Starring: Faye Dunaway; Christopher Plummer; Bibi Andersson; Murray Hamilton; Nancy Marchand; Brooke Shields
- Country of origin: United States
- Original language: English

Production
- Producers: Gilbert Cates; Peter Dohanos
- Running time: 128 minutes

Original release
- Network: NBC
- Release: October 12, 1974

After the Fall is a 1974 American television film directed by Gilbert Cates and starred Faye Dunaway, Christopher Plummer, Bibi Andersson, Murray Hamilton, Nancy Marchand and Brooke Shields. It is an adaptation of Arthur Miller's 1964 semi-autobiographical play based on his marriage to Marilyn Monroe. The production was broadcast on NBC on December 10, 1974.

== Production ==
Rights to the play were bought by MGM, which failed to make a movie. In 1967, the rights were bought by Doctor Zhivago producer Carlo Ponti, who intended to produce a film directed by Fred Zinneman starring his wife, Sophia Loren as Maggie and Paul Newman as Quentin. When that project failed, Paramount Studios acquired the rights, but the project wasn't realized until NBC made it for TV in 1974.

According to the TV Guide 1974-75 Fall Preview edition, After the Fall was originally intended to be part of the 1973 TV season, and the December 1974 broadcast was a "year late".

Faye Dunaway played the supporting character of Nurse in the original 1964 Broadway production, and also was the understudy of Barbara Loden, who originated the part of Maggie. NBC censors insisted that she wear Band-Aids over her nipples when she appeared in a sheer dress.

In her autobiography Looking for Gatsby, Dunaway wrote:

The project had been in the works for years, and after going through a series of hands, it looked as if the only way it might get made was through a special on television. It was staged as a play, not adapted for film, which made it far less complicated and expensive to put on.

The TV production was shot at the Old Globe Theater.

== Cast ==
| Actor | Role |
|---|---|
| Faye Dunaway | Maggie |
| Christopher Plummer | Quentin |
| Bibi Andersson | Holga |
| Murray Hamilton | Mickey |
| Nancy Marchand | Elaine Dodd |
| Brooke Shields | Quentin's daughter |
| Mariclare Costello | Louise |
| Dorothi Fox | Carrie |

== Reception ==
In a New York Times review, John J. O'Connor noted that while Miller reworked aspects of After the Fall, "The play itself remains a distressing failure." He did praise the acting, saying the acting was "excellent." Of the two principals, he wrote, "Christopher Plummer provides a brilliantly modulated portrait of Quentin, and Faye Dunaway is superb as Maggie, distilling the essence of a Monroe type while avoiding cheap impersonation."
