= George Clayton Johnson =

American writer (1929–2015)

- Johnson in 2014
- Born: July 10, 1929; Cheyenne, Wyoming, U.S.
- Died: December 25, 2015 (aged 86); Los Angeles, California, U.S.
- Occupation: Writer
- Spouse: Lola Johnson (m. 1952)
- Children: 2
- Writing career
- Years active: 1959–2015
- Genres: Science fiction; magical realism; fantasy; literary; Western; horror
- Notable works: Logan's Run; Ocean's 11; The Twilight Zone; Star Trek
- Notable awards: Inkpot Award (1976); Balrog Award (1983)

George Clayton Johnson (July 10, 1929 – December 25, 2015) was an American science fiction writer, who co-wrote with William F. Nolan the novel Logan's Run, the basis for the MGM 1976 film. He also wrote television scripts for The Twilight Zone (including "Nothing in the Dark", "Kick the Can", "A Game of Pool", and "A Penny for Your Thoughts"), and the first telecast episode of Star Trek, entitled "The Man Trap". He also wrote the story and screenplay on which the 1960 film Ocean's 11 and its 2001 remake were based.

== Early life ==
Johnson was born in a barn in Cheyenne, Wyoming, was forced to repeat the sixth grade, and dropped out of school entirely in the eighth. He briefly served as a telegraph operator and draftsman in the United States Army, then enrolled at the Alabama Polytechnic Institute (now Auburn University) under the G.I. Bill, but quit to return to his travels around the U.S., working as a draftsman, before becoming a writer.

== Writing career ==
"For me, fantasy must be about something, otherwise it's foolishness ... ultimately it must be about human beings, it must be about the human condition, it must be another look at infinity, it must be another way of seeing the paradox of existence."

— Johnson quoted in The Twilight Zone Companion

Between 1956 and early 1957, he created the story entitled "Ocean's Eleven" beginning with a 40,000 word attempt at a novel. During this time he asked his friend Jack Golden Russell, a former WWII paratrooper, if he could add ideas of authenticity to the tale, later crediting him for his contributions to the story. Johnson then thought of approaching the story as a screenplay. Under the name "George Johnson", he solely authored the script for the Rat Pack film Ocean's 11, although most of the details were changed for the actual film. The story and screenplay were optioned to Peter Lawford and his wife, Patricia Kennedy in 1957.

From 1959 onward, Johnson's work began to regularly appear in magazines such as Playboy, Los Angeles, The Twilight Zone Magazine, Rogue, and Gamma, and he began to write stories and scripts for TV. In 1959, Johnson wrote the story "I'll Take Care of You" for Alfred Hitchcock Presents. Later, Johnson joined the Southern California School of Writers that included, among others, William F. Nolan, Charles Beaumont, Richard Matheson and Ray Bradbury.

Through them he met Rod Serling, to whom he sold his story "All of Us Are Dying", which was produced as "The Four of Us Are Dying", scripted by Serling. Eventually, after selling other stories and having them scripted by other writers for the show, Johnson asked Serling to let him attempt a teleplay for the series, which was "A Penny for Your Thoughts". Later, after completing more scripts for The Twilight Zone, he worked as a writer for other television series, including Honey West, Wanted Dead or Alive, Route 66 and Kung Fu. Johnson also wrote the Star Trek episode "The Man Trap", which was the first episode telecast. Johnson briefly had a L.A.-based radio program called "The Writer and the Story" which featured interviews with authors, including Charles Beaumont and William F. Nolan. As his career progressed, Johnson formed, in the 1960s, a loose, short-lived federation with fellow authors and friends Matheson, Theodore Sturgeon, and others called "The Green Hand". The intent was to leverage their works in the fashion of a union within the Hollywood system for TV production. The enterprise fell apart after a few months. In his later years, he wrote comic books and was a frequent guest at science fiction and comics conventions. Johnson co-created the comic book series Deepest Dimension Terror Anthology with cartoonist and author Jay Allen Sanford.

== Personal life ==
Johnson married Lola Brownstein on October 10, 1952, in Los Angeles, and fathered two children, Paul and Judy. He was a vocal advocate for the legalization of marijuana. Along with his writing output, Johnson was instrumental to the early development of San Diego Comic Con. He was also a longtime vegetarian.

=== Death ===
Johnson died on Christmas Day 2015, of bladder and prostate cancer at a Veterans Administration Medical Center hospital in North Hills, California. He is interred at Riverside National Cemetery.

== Partial bibliography ==
=== Novels ===
- Ocean's 11 (1960) – Novelization (based on the story by George Clayton Johnson and Jack Golden Russell and screenplay by "George Johnson")

The Logan series

- Logan's Run (1967) – Novel (with William F. Nolan)
- Jessica's Run: A New Sequel for the Logan's Run Universe (George Clayton Johnson's long rumored personal sequel to Logan's Run said to be "in development"; yet to be published)

=== Television and film scripts ===
- Icarus Montgolfier Wright (with Ray Bradbury; 1962)
- Logan's Run (1976)

==== Alfred Hitchcock Presents ====
- "I'll Take Care of You" (1959; story by)

==== The Twilight Zone ====
- "The Four of Us Are Dying (1960; story by)
- "Execution" (1960; story by)
- "A Penny for Your Thoughts" (1961; teleplay)
- The Prime Mover (1961; story; uncredited)
- "A Game of Pool" (1961; teleplay)
- "Nothing in the Dark" (1962; teleplay)
- "Kick the Can" (1962; teleplay; also featured in the 1983 movie The Twilight Zone: The Movie)
- "Ninety Years Without Slumbering" (1963; story by, as Johnson Smith)
- In 1960, Johnson submitted a story to The Twilight Zone called "Sea Change" which wasn't used but was later adapted for Johnson's 1994 comic book series Deepest Dimension Terror Anthology.

==== Route 66 ====
- "Eleven, the Hard Way" (1961; written by)

==== Honey West ====
- "The Flame and the Pussycat" (1965; teleplay)

==== Star Trek ====
- "The Man Trap" (1966; teleplay; first aired episode of the series)

==== Kung Fu ====
- "The Demon God" (1974; teleplay)

=== Film, TV and documentary appearances ===
- Sea Hunt ("Sub Hatch" [Season 4, Episode 19]; 1961) as "USCG Lt. Hartwell"
- The Intruder (dir. Roger Corman; 1962) as villain "Phil West"
- Archive of American Television (2003) as himself
- Charles Beaumont: The Short Life of Twilight Zone's Magic Man (dir. Jason V Brock; JaSunni Productions, LLC; 2010) as himself
- The AckerMonster Chronicles! (dir. Jason V Brock; JaSunni Productions, LLC; 2012) as himself

=== Fiction collections ===
- Writing for The Twilight Zone (Outre House, 1980)
- George Clayton Johnson Twilight Zone Scripts & Stories (Streamline Pictures, 1996)
- All of Us Are Dying and Other Stories (Subterranean Press, 1999)

== Awards and nominations ==
Year	Association	Category	Work	Result	ref
1976	Inkpot Award	Lifetime achievement	Screenwriter; Comic book writer	Won	
1976	Nebula Award	Nebula Award for Best Script	Logan's Run	Nominated	
1977	Hugo Award	Hugo Award for Best Dramatic Presentation	Logan's Run	Nominated	
1980	Balrog Award	Best works and achievements of speculative fiction	A Penny For Your Thoughts (The Twilight Zone) (S 2:Ep 16)	Nominated	
1980	Balrog Award	Best works and achievements of speculative fiction	Nothing in the Dark (The Twilight Zone) (S 3:Ep 16)	Nominated	
1981	Balrog Award	Best works and achievements of speculative fiction	Sea Change (The Twilight Zone)^{1}	Nominated	
1982	Balrog Award	Best works and achievements of speculative fiction	All of Us Are Dying (Twilight Zone May 1982)^{2}	Won	

Notes

1. Unused script by Johnson not selected for the original television series.
2. Story was turned into a teleplay by Serling to the episode named The Four of Us Are Dying.
