= Murray Hamilton =

American actor (1923–1986)

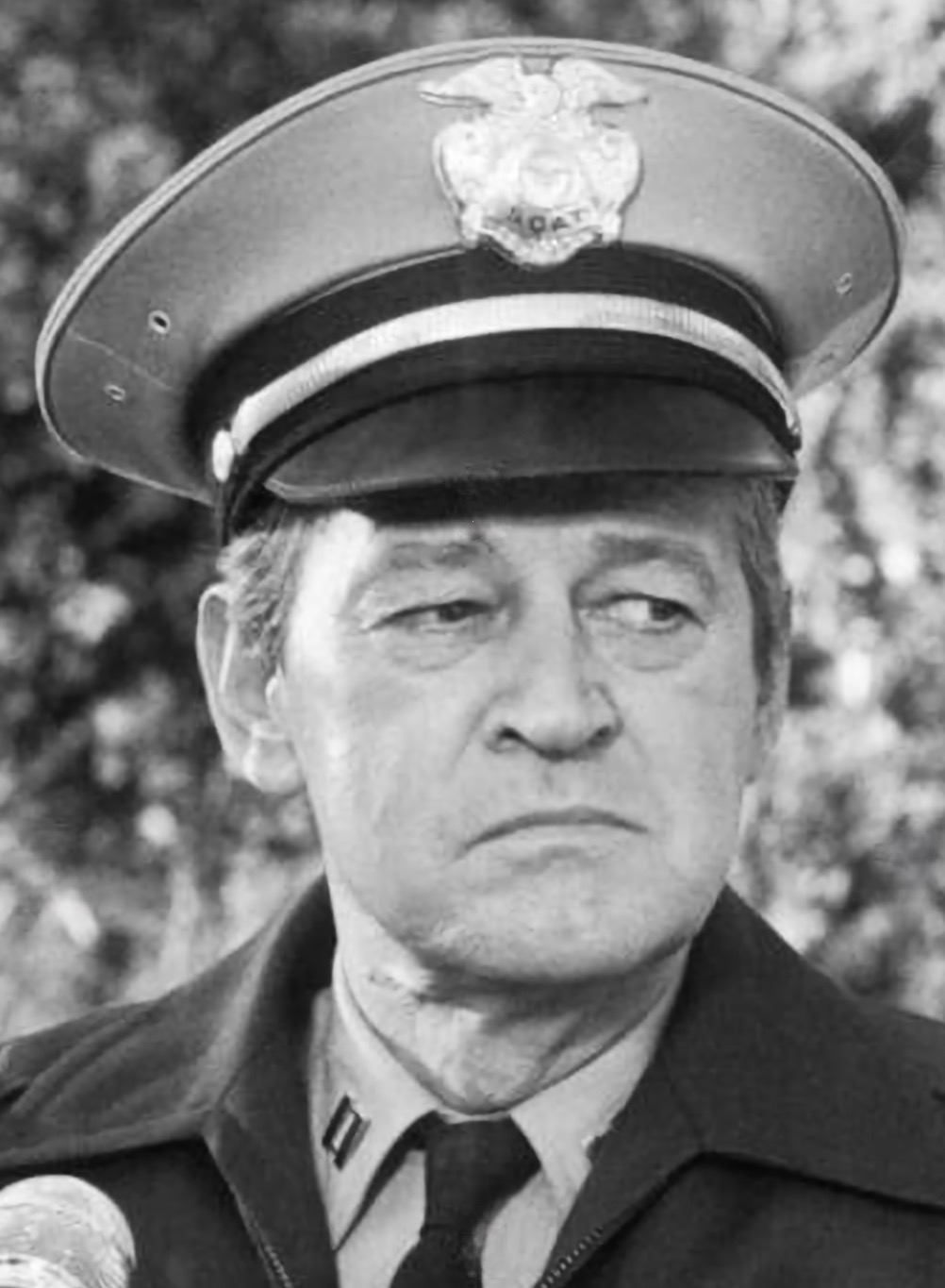
- Hamilton in B. J. and the Bear, 1981
- Born: March 24, 1923; Washington, North Carolina, U.S.
- Died: September 1, 1986 (aged 63); Washington, North Carolina, U.S.
- Occupation: Actor
- Years active: 1944–1986
- Spouse: Terri DeMarco (m. 1953)
- Children: 1

Murray Hamilton (March 24, 1923 – September 1, 1986) was an American stage, screen and television character actor who appeared in such acclaimed films as The Spirit of St. Louis, Anatomy of a Murder, The Hustler, The Graduate, The Way We Were, Jaws and The Amityville Horror.

== Early life ==
Hamilton was born in Washington, North Carolina. He displayed an early interest in performing during his days at Washington High School just before America's entry into World War II. Bad hearing kept him from enlisting, so he moved to New York City as a 19-year-old to find a career on stage.

== Career ==
In an early role, he performed on stage with Henry Fonda in the wartime story Mister Roberts as a replacement for David Wayne, playing Ensign Pulver. In 1960, he was onstage again with Fonda in Critic's Choice; Howard Taubman of The New York Times called him "properly obnoxious as the director". Hamilton was teamed once more with Fonda in 1968 for the drama film The Boston Strangler.

Hamilton's best-known performance is as Larry Vaughn, the mayor of Amity, in the Steven Spielberg thriller Jaws (1975). Hamilton reprised the role in the sequel, Jaws 2 (1978). He had agreed to reprise the role again in Jaws: The Revenge, but died in 1986, before production began. He was just 63 years old. Other notable big-screen appearances include the critically acclaimed 1959 film Anatomy of a Murder with James Stewart, in which he played the bartender Al Pacquette, who gives testimony in the murder of Barney Quill. He also worked with Stewart in The Spirit of St. Louis (1957) and The FBI Story (1959).

The actor made dozens of TV guest appearances. In 1955, Hamilton guest-starred on the NBC legal drama Justice, based on case files of the Legal Aid Society of New York. Hamilton appeared in the Perry Mason episode "The Case of the Deadly Double" (1958) as Johnny Hale. In 1957, he played a conniving cowboy who sets up Chester for a murder charge as "Jake Buley" in the Gunsmoke episode "Chester's Murder". In 1959, he appeared in a few episodes of the crime drama The Untouchables, as well as co-starring in the second episode of Rod Serling's television series The Twilight Zone, "One for the Angels", playing Mr. Death opposite Ed Wynn. Also, Hamilton portrayed Calhoun, on an episode of Gunsmoke, which aired in April 1959. His character is swindled in a land deal along with other members of a wagon train.

In the 1959–60 television season, Hamilton co-starred with William Demarest, Jeanne Bal and Stubby Kaye in the NBC sitcom Love and Marriage. He played attorney Steve Baker, who resides in an apartment with his wife (played by Bal), two daughters and a father-in-law (portrayed by Demarest). He soon appeared as a guest star on another sitcom, The Real McCoys, starring Walter Brennan, on ABC. In 1961, he appeared in another science fiction series, 'Way Out, hosted by Roald Dahl, with fellow guest stars Doris Roberts and Martin Huston. He guest-starred in an episode of the James Stewart legal drama Hawkins in 1973. In 1986, he played Curtis "Big Daddy" Hollingsworth, Blanche Devereaux's father, in a first-season episode of The Golden Girls.

Hamilton complained in a newspaper article about being typecast, stating "After I was first cast as a heavy on The Untouchables, I couldn't ever persuade them [producers] that I could also do something else." While comic roles were rare for Hamilton during his Hollywood career, he had one opposite Andy Griffith in the 1958 military comedy No Time for Sergeants, as well as an appearance in Steven Spielberg's raucous comedy 1941, released in 1979. He also appeared in a comedic guest spot on Mama's Family in the second-season episode "Mama Cries Uncle" as Uncle Roy. He was more often cast in dramatic works, such as the science-fiction drama Seconds (1966), which starred Rock Hudson. In his most high-profile performances, Hamilton appeared with Paul Newman in The Hustler (1961), playing Findley, a wealthy billiards player who gambles for high stakes, and with Dustin Hoffman in The Graduate (1967) as Mr. Robinson, husband of the seductress Mrs. Robinson. In 1975, Hamilton appeared again with Newman in The Drowning Pool. He also worked with Robert Redford in a pair of films, The Way We Were (1973) and Brubaker (1980). In early 1982 he appeared as a judge presiding over an impromptu court case on an episode of Bret Maverick.

For many years before and during his film career, Hamilton was a prominent dramatic stage actor, earning a Tony Award nomination for his role in the 1965 production of Absence of a Cello. New York Times theater critic Brooks Atkinson praised his work in the play Stockade, which was based on a part of the James Jones novel From Here to Eternity: "Murray Hamilton is an ideal Prewitt. Modest in manner, pleasant of voice, he has a steel-like spirit that brings Prewitt honestly to life." When the actor was suffering from cancer and found film roles harder to come by, his old co-star George C. Scott helped out by getting him a part in the made-for-television movie The Last Days of Patton (1986).

== Death ==
Hamilton died of lung cancer at age 63, and is interred at Oakdale Cemetery in his native Washington, North Carolina. He and his wife, Terri DeMarco Hamilton (of The DeMarco Sisters), had a son, David Honeycutt Hamilton.

== Filmography ==
- 1944 Song of the Open Road as Crop Corps Kid (uncredited)
- 1944 Reckless Age as Member of Soldier Quartet
- 1944 Something for the Boys as Soldier (uncredited)
- 1951 Bright Victory as Pete Hamilton
- 1951 The Whistle at Eaton Falls as Al Webster
- 1956 Toward the Unknown as Major Bromo Lee
- 1956 The Girl He Left Behind as Sergeant Clyde
- 1957 The Spirit of St. Louis as Bud Gurney
- 1957 Jeanne Eagels as Chick O'Hara
- 1958 Gunsmoke as Calhoun
- 1958 Darby's Rangers as Private / Sergeant Sims Delancey
- 1958 Too Much, Too Soon as Charlie Snow
- 1958 The Silent Service as Captain Latham
- 1958 No Time for Sergeants as Irving S. Blanchard
- 1958 Perry Mason as Johnny Hale
- 1958 Houseboat as Captain Alan Wilson
- 1959 Anatomy of a Murder as Alphonse Paquette
- 1959 The FBI Story as Sam Crandall
- 1959 The Twilight Zone (Season 1 Episode 2: "One for the Angels") as Mr. Death
- 1960 Tall Story as Coach Sandy Hardy
- 1960 Route 66 (Season 1 Episode 3: "The Swan Bed") as Dr. Stafford
- 1960 Alfred Hitchcock Presents (Season 5 Episode 37: "Escape to Sonoita") as Marsh
- 1961 The Hustler as Findley
- 1962 The Farmer's Daughter (TV movie) as Nordick
- 1963 Papa's Delicate Condition as Mr. Harvey
- 1963 13 Frightened Girls as Wally Sanders
- 1963 The Cardinal as Lafe
- 1965 Inherit the Wind (TV movie) as E.K. Hornbeck
- 1966 Seconds as Charlie
- 1966 An American Dream as Arthur Kabot
- 1965 The Fugitive as Joe Steelman
- 1967 A Bell for Adano (TV movie) as Sergeant Leonard Borth
- 1967 The Graduate as Mr. Robinson
- 1968 Sergeant Ryker as Captain Appleton
- 1968 No Way to Treat a Lady as Inspector Haines
- 1968 The Boston Strangler as Detective Sergeant Frank McAfee
- 1968 The Brotherhood as Jim Egan
- 1969 If It's Tuesday, This Must Be Belgium as Fred Ferguson
- 1971 Vanished (TV movie) as Nick McCann
- 1971 Cannon (TV movie) as Virgil Holley
- 1971 A Tattered Web (TV movie) as Sergeant Joe Marcus
- 1971 The Police (TV movie) as Chief of Police
- 1971 The Harness (TV movie) as Roy Kern
- 1971 The Failing of Raymond (TV movie) as Sergeant Manzak
- 1972 Deadly Harvest (TV movie) as Sheriff Bill Jessup
- 1973 Incident on a Dark Street (TV movie) as Edmund Schilling
- 1973 Murdock's Gang (TV movie) as Harold Talbot
- 1973 The Way We Were as Brooks Carpenter
- 1974 After the Fall (TV movie) as Mickey
- 1975 Jaws as Mayor Larry Vaughn
- 1975 The Drowning Pool as Kilbourne
- 1977 Murder at the World Series (TV movie) as Harvey Murkison
- 1977 Damnation Alley as General Landers (uncredited)
- 1977 Killer on Board (TV movie) as Dr. Folger
- 1978 Casey's Shadow as Tom Patterson
- 1978 Jaws 2 as Mayor Larry Vaughn
- 1979 Donovan's Kid (TV movie) as Henry Carpenter
- 1979 A Last Cry for Help (TV movie) as Ralph Muir
- 1979 The Amityville Horror as Father Ryan
- 1979 1941 as Claude Crumn
- 1980 Swan Song (TV movie) as Jack McCauley
- 1980 Brubaker as John Deach
- 1981 All the Way Home (TV movie) as Joel Lynch
- 1981 B. J. and the Bear as Captain Rutherford T. Grant
- 1982 Mazes and Monsters (TV movie) as Lieutenant Martini
- 1983 Hysterical as The Mayor
- 1983 Summer Girl (TV movie) as Jack Reardon
- 1984 Boys in Blue (TV movie) as Captain Sid Bender
- 1984 Mama's Family as Uncle Roy Harper
- 1984 Murder, She Wrote as Bud Michaels
- 1985 Too Scared to Scream as Jack
- 1986 The Last Days of Patton (TV movie) as General Hobart "Hap" Gay
- 1986 Blacke's Magic as Ben McGuire
- 1986 The Golden Girls as Curtis "Big Daddy" Hollingsworth
- 1986 Whoops Apocalypse as Jack "Kill The Commies" Preston
