= Then Came Bronson =

American television series

- European pilot poster
- Genre: Adventure drama
- Created by: Denne Bart Petitclerc
- Starring: Michael Parks
- Theme music composer: George Duning; James Richard Hendricks (end theme)
- Opening theme: "Then Came Bronson"; George Duning, composer-conductor
- Ending theme: "Long Lonesome Highway"; Jim Hendricks, lyrics writer/music composer Performed by Michael Parks
- Composers: George Duning, Gil Mellé
- Country of origin: United States
- Original language: English
- No. of seasons: 1
- No. of episodes: 26 (list of episodes)

Production
- Executive producer: Herbert F. Solow
- Producers: Robert H. Justman; Robert Sabaroff
- Running time: 50 minutes
- Production company: MGM Television

Original release
- Network: NBC
- Release: September 17, 1969 – April 1, 1970

Then Came Bronson is an American adventure/drama television series starring Michael Parks that aired on NBC. It was created by Denne Bart Petitclerc, and produced by MGM Television. Then Came Bronson began with a television film pilot that aired on NBC on March 24, 1969; the pilot was also released in Europe as a theatrical feature film. This was followed by a single season of 26 episodes airing between September 17, 1969, and April 1, 1970.

== Overview ==
The series features Parks as the protagonist, James "Jim" Bronson, a newspaperman who becomes disillusioned after the suicide of his best friend Nick (Martin Sheen), and with "working for The Man" after a heated argument with his editor.

In order to renew his soul, Bronson becomes a vagabond searching for the meaning of life and seeking experiences that life has to offer (as revealed in the series pilot). During his travels, he shares his values with the people he meets along the way and to whom he lends a helping hand when possible. Bronson rides a Harley-Davidson Sportster motorcycle, and as such, he was viewed by some as a modern version of the solitary cowboy wandering the American west. The motorcycle had previously been sold to Nick by Bronson. After it is left at the scene of the suicide by his friend, Bronson buys it back from the widow.

Though the opening promises a journey of self-discovery, the premise of each episode is that Bronson enters someone else's life at a crucial point and acts as a catalyst for change. When Bronson encounters an Amish community, for example, a local boy becomes enrapt by the outside world and steals Bronson's motorcycle to run off to Reno, Nevada. In another episode, located in Reno, Nevada, Bronson meets his cousin Eve on her wedding day and lends her money for the wedding service, but she runs off to the casinos and gambles it away.

The first three episodes, including the end credits scenes, were shot in and around Jackson, Wyoming. The pilot film was also shown at the town's (then) only theater to give the locals a sense of what the series was going to be about, since they were shooting in town and at popular local area locations.

Bronson is committed to pacifism and often redirects an antagonist's anger into self-examination. Always, like a true catalyst, Bronson rolls out of every episode unchanged.

The show had obvious similarities to the early 1960s series Route 66; Michael Parks guest-starred in one episode of that series. It was also sometimes erroneously described as a knock-off of Easy Rider, which was conceived in late 1967 and shot in the first half of 1968. Editing plus acquiring rights to music was a lengthy process, thus the first public showing of Easy Rider was in May 1969 in France at the 1969 Cannes Film Festival. The airing of the 2-hour Then Came Bronson pilot film on March 24, 1969 preceded it by about two months. On the other hand, Easy Rider was in US cinemas since 4 July 1969, while Then Came Bronson aired ten weeks later.

=== Series opening ===
The opening of the show served as a metaphor for the premise of the show: getting away from the "big city" and leading a simpler life. The opening begins with Bronson riding up to a red light in San Francisco and he briefly chats with a commuter. The scene also introduces Bronson's signature-phrase, which he often used in the episodes, "Hang in there".

Driver: "Taking a trip?"
Bronson: "What's that?"
Driver: "Taking a trip?"
Bronson: "Yeah."
Driver: "Where to?"
Bronson: "Oh, I don't know. Wherever I end up, I guess."
Driver: "Man, I wish I was you."
Bronson: "Really?"
Driver: "Yeah."
Bronson: "Well, hang in there."

From here he heads out to California's State Route 1 and then crosses over the Bixby Creek Bridge.

== Cast ==
Michael Parks, who starred as James Bronson, had acted on television and starred in three anti-establishment films, Wild Seed, The Happening, and Bus Riley's Back in Town. He went on to have a steady career in drive-in horror movies and TV shows. Also a talented singer, Parks recorded three pop/jazz albums: Long Lonesome Highway, Closing the Gap, Blue, and several gospel albums. Long Lonesome Highway and Closing the Gap were connected with particular strength to Then Came Bronson. Parks performed the former's title selection over the closing credits of each episode, and it and the latter both featured other music from the series. (See below.)

=== Guest stars ===
Actors James Doohan ("Scotty") and Meg Wyllie, who appeared in guest roles, had previously worked on the original Star Trek series.

== Production ==
The series was filmed and broadcast in color.

=== The motorcycle ===
Bronson's motorcycle, a 1969 XLH 900cc Harley-Davidson Sportster, figures in many episodes. In one episode he enters several motorcycle races; in another, he makes an emergency run to fetch a doctor, but in some stories, the motorcycle serves merely as his transportation.

The fuel tank is illustrated with the Eye of Providence.

=== Crew ===
Several of Bronson's production staff and cast members had previously worked on the original Star Trek series, including executive producer Herbert F. Solow and producer Robert H. Justman, and writers D. C. Fontana and Robert Sabaroff.

The series is also notable for providing the first television script credit for writer-producer Susan Harris, who went on to create Soap and The Golden Girls.

=== Music ===
The opening instrumental theme song was titled "Then Came Bronson" and was composed and conducted by George Duning. The closing vocal theme for the series, titled "Long Lonesome Highway", was sung by Parks and written and composed by James Hendricks; it was a Billboard Magazine Hot 100 hit that reached #20 in 1970.

On March 25, 1970, Parks guest-starred on "The Johnny Cash Show" S1E25. Cash riding Bronson's Harley-Davidson introduces Parks as Bronson, saying, "And then Bronson came back to Tennessee". Parks sang his hit song from the show and then he and Johnny did a duet of Woody Guthrie's "Oklahoma Hills".

Parks released two albums on the MGM label that featured music from this series, Closing the Gap (1969), and Long Lonesome Highway (1970). In addition, other artists such as John Bahler, Kiel Martin, Gary Jayson, Buffy Sainte-Marie, and Tom Paxton sang songs that appeared in the series. Actress Bonnie Bedelia in the pilot sang gospel song "Wayfaring Stranger" with Parks.

A version of "San Antonio Rose", sung by Parks, appears on the Rhino CD Golden Throats 3: Sweethearts of Rodeo Drive.

In 2010, Duning's score for the pilot and two episode scores by Gil Mellé were released as part of Film Score Monthly's TV Omnibus: Volume One (1962–1976). In 2013 Intrada Records released a two-disc set of music from the series, featuring Duning's six episode scores on disc one and selections from the other scores on disc two by John Parker, Elliot Kaplan, Stu Phillips, Dean Elliott, Richard Shores, Tom McIntosh, and Philip Springer.

== Episodes ==
No.	Title	Directed by	Written by	Original release date
0	Then Came Bronson	William Graham	Denne Bart Petitclerc	March 24, 1969
Pilot: Nick (Martin Sheen), a friend of Jim Bronson, commits suicide after asking Bronson to buy back his motorcycle from his soon-to-be widow Sheree North. Bronson had originally owned and customized the bike, then sold it to Nick when he became a reporter. Nick's tragedy makes Bronson think about the meaning of his life and soon decides to quit the "rat race." He then takes to the road on the motorcycle to discover what life would put in his path. Other actors: Bonnie Bedelia, Akim Tamiroff, Gary Merrill. Song: "Wayfarin' Stranger" (sung by Michael Parks and Bonnie Bedelia). Note: Aired as a 2-hour television film. An alternate version, featuring nudity, was released to theaters on April 1, 1970.
1	"The Runner"	Marvin J. Chomsky	Lionel E. Siegel	September 17, 1969
Jim Bronson takes a temp job at Hanrahan School, a summer camp for disturbed children run by noted therapist Edward Hanrahan (Jack Klugman) and his daughter Doris who is an old girlfriend of Bronson. He becomes interested in an autistic student John (Mark Lester) known as "the runner" because to his penchant to flee. Edward Hanrahan gives Bronson wide latitude in dealing with John. Other actors: Penny Marshall Song: "Softly And Tenderly" (sung by Michael Parks). Note: It was during the filming of this episode in Jackson Hole, Wyoming when Penny Marshall approached Jack Klugman and asked if he would be interested in starring in The Odd Couple, which was being produced by her brother Garry Marshall.
2	"The Old Motorcycle Fiasco"	Marvin J. Chomsky	Jon Edward Manson & Thomas Y. Drake	September 24, 1969
When Bronson's motorcycle is inadvertently damaged by a careless gasoline attendant, a grizzled old-timer named Alex (Keenan Wynn) lets Bronson use his ranch to make repairs. Alex shows Bronson his old bike, a 1937 Rudge Ulster, that had been in storage for years. Soon, both are riding again, and since Alex had promised his wife Nora to abandon motorcycles, it leads to complications in his marriage. Other actors: Meg Wyllie Song: "Tie Me To Your Apron Strings Again" (Parks).
3	"A Famine Where Abundance Lies"	Jud Taylor	Frank B. Paris	October 1, 1969
Bronson is hired by lonely widow Monica (Carol Eve Rossen) to work on her ranch. Her teenage daughter Lori (Charlotte Stewart) soon becomes smitten with Bronson and Monica finds Bronson's demeanor captivating as well. Bronson's dilemma: how to deal with the attention of both women without causing them emotional injury. Songs: "Sunshine Showers", "Ride 'Em Cowboy" (Parks).
4	"A Circle of Time"	Jud Taylor	Robert Malcolm Young	October 8, 1969
Bronson ends up in a ghost town whose sole resident is Hattie Calder (Elsa Lanchester). She piques Bronson's interest with her vitality and tales of surviving the Titanic disaster. Hattie has an ongoing quarrel with Abner Hotchman who is secretly looking for a silver vein in the area. Her one remaining wish in life: to be buried next to her husband in a nearby plot. Other actors: Dabney Coleman Song: "I Think Of You" (Parks).
5	"Where Will the Trumpets Be?"	Jud Taylor	Robert Sabaroff	October 15, 1969
Bullfighter Miguel (Fernando Lamas) approaches motorcycle riding using the same aggressive methods that he uses to fight bulls. Bronson is reluctant when Miguel tries to imbue Bronson with his same values and suggests that he use similar methods. In the meantime Bella (Lane Bradbury) and Morgana (Jessica Walter), two beautiful sisters, compete for the attention of both men.
6	"Amid Splinters of the Thunderbolt"	Marvin J. Chomsky	Donald G. Ingalls	October 22, 1969
Bronson travels to Colorado to find an old friend named Bucky O'Neill (Bruce Dern): a priest with a crisis of conscience. Bucky has fallen in love with Mary Draper (Zohra Lampert) and yet leaving the priesthood torments him. Mary is tortured as well and blames herself for Bucky's problem. She believes she's destined to die giving childbirth. When she refuses medical help Bronson is forced to make a decision. Other actors: James Doohan Song: "Wayfarin' Stranger" (Parks).
7	"The 3:13 Arrives at Noon"	Michael O'Herlihy	Lee Cronin	October 29, 1969
Clay Turner (Bob Steele) is a bank robber and former local hero who has been imprisoned for years. After being paroled he returns to his hometown and it causes three people anxiety. The reasons: Turner had made revenge threats to Ed Hemmings for turning him in many years ago and Earl Braeden is now married to Turner's former girlfriend Charlene Braeden. Charlene (Gloria Grahame) preens herself for Turner's return as if she were his current paramour. Amongst all this anxiety, Bronson finds Turner's return affects him as well in this modern age Western confrontation. Other actors: Kenneth MacDonald
8	"Old Tigers Never Die—They Just Run Away"	Robert L. Friend	Ed Adamson	November 5, 1969
Bronson stays at the home of Oliver (Will Geer) a retired pressman who loves to talk. Russ Faber (Gabriel Dell) learns that Bronson plans to enter a local motorcycle race and becomes obsessed with defeating Bronson in the race. Other actors: Diane Ladd, Iron Eyes Cody
9	"Your Love is Like a Demolition Derby in My Heart"	Jud Taylor	Thomas Y. Drake	November 19, 1969
Bronson arrives in a small town and asks Leona (Flora Plumb) out on a date. She has a brother, Darryl (Tim McIntire), whose excessive protection of her causes her dismay. Bronson helps Leona enter a demolition derby that puts Bronson in a predicament with her brother. Other actors: David Huddleston
10	"Two Percent of Nothing"	Allen H. Miner	D. C. Fontana	November 26, 1969
Bronson accepts a percentage of an oil well that is possibly ready to blow, in lieu of cash for work done for Royce MacLeod (Steve Ihnat). MacLeod faces foreclosure on the land if he can't beat the target date specified on a promissory note owned by Mac Keller. Other actors: Zalman King, Percy Rodriguez Note: This episode, written by D.C. Fontana, was nominated for the Writers Guild of America Award.
11	"All the World and God"	Jud Taylor	Gustave Field	December 3, 1969
Bronson befriends a nurse, Barbara Timmons (Lois Nettleton), who mourns the death of a doctor she worked for. Timmons considers quitting her job because of her grief but is uncertain because she worries about her patients care. Bronson admires Timmons' work as a nurturing caregiver, yet finds helping her a challenge.
12	"A Long Trip to Yesterday"	Paul Stanley	Robert L. Goodwin	December 10, 1969
Bronson helps a reluctant biker in distress, Henry Tate (Robert Hooks), with a loan when his bike breaks down on the road. In order to repay him Tate takes Bronson to his family's home where he has not visited since he left many years ago. Tate's homecoming causes tribulation for all. Other actors: Bucklind Noah Beery, Slim Gaillard Song: "Red Wagon" (Parks).
13	"The Spitball Kid"	Unknown	Story by : Alfred Brenner; Teleplay by : Lionel E. Siegel	December 17, 1969
The arrogant William Lovering (Kurt Russell) is regarded as a great pitcher in a local bush league baseball team. When Bronson rides into town and takes a job as a ball player he soon finds he's able to hit the ball off Lovering at will. Bronson tries to prepare Lovering for a try out with major league scout Art Gilroy (Don Drysdale).
14	"Against a Blank Cold Wall"	Unknown	Rik Vollaerts	December 24, 1969
Native American Tony Wade (Robert Loggia) has taken his family into bleak country to perform his Vision Quest in order to reclaim his spirit. Bronson, an old friend of Tony, locates him and his family and finds them in dire straits. Even though Tony, his wife Linda (Pilar Seurat) and son, are underfed and malnourished, Tony still demands that Bronson leave. Linda urges Bronson to stay and reveals a secret she has not told Tony. Song: "Oklahoma Hills" (Parks).
15	"Sybil"	Unknown	Story by : Sidney Ellis & Thomas Y. Drake; Teleplay by : Thomas Y. Drake	December 31, 1969
Bronson is charmed by Sybil (Renne Jarrett) who fancies herself a witch and is part of a band of occultists led by cult-leader Hermes (Michael Lipton). Bronson at first is entertained by her beliefs but later recoils at her lifestyle. Ultimately, Sybil has to determine the greater meaning of the supernatural, and in the process, life. Song: "Sunshine Showers" (Parks).
16	"A-Pickin' an' A-Singin'"	Unknown	Charles A. McDaniel	January 14, 1970
Bronson becomes part of a singing duo with Billy Mulavey (Michael Burns) in order to compete in a song contest and land a job at a highway honky-tonk. Johnny Dell (Skip Homeier), a greedy local disk jockey, signs songwriter Billy to a restrictive contract, but Billy has running on his mind. Betty (Jana Taylor), the waitress who loves Billy, and Bronson wonder about Billy's veracity when Mickey Rand (Martin Speer) claims ownership of the songs written by Billy. Songs: "Big T Water", "Summer Days", "Mountain High" (Parks).
17	"The Gleam of the Eagle Mind"	Unknown	Donald G. Ingalls	January 21, 1970
When eccentric painter Juan Longorio (Jay Novello) paints a mural of a naked woman on the side of a barn it places him and Bronson in trouble with the owner, Sid Casper, and the city locals. Still, more problematic than defacing private property, the painting causes emotional anguish to Sid (John Dehner), the deputy sheriff Hud McCarver (Richard Webb), and Will Hudson (Sam Edwards), because they all think the painting is a picture perfect representation of their respective wives.
18	"That Undiscovered Country"	Unknown	Ben Masselink	January 28, 1970
When Bronson arrives in an Amish community his tales of the "outside world" captivate a young man and woman, Harold Mueller (Mark Jenkins) and Dorothy Hofer (Heidi Vaughn), who are betrothed. Soon, Harold becomes jealous of Dorothy's attraction towards Bronson and heads out to see the world he has been missing. In the city, Harold meets the model Jan, and in the meantime, back in the Amish community, Dorothy ponders about love and the future. Other actors: Rance Howard, Bebe Kelly Songs: "Wonderin' Where I'm Wanderin'", "I'm Bound For The Mountains And The Sea" (both sung by Kiel Martin).
19	"Lucky Day"	Unknown	Story by : Lionel E. Siegel & Arthur H. Singer; Teleplay by : Lionel E. Siegel	February 4, 1970
Bronson travels to see his cousin Eve Bronson in Reno, Nevada. Eve (Lynne Marta) is engaged to Len (Barry Brown) and both decide to marry while Jim Bronson is in town. Jim gives his cousin money to buy a wedding dress but Eve impetuously chooses to gamble with the money at a nearby casino and catches "the fever". Eve's absence delays the wedding plans and Len confides to Bronson about his upcoming marriage and life.
20	"Mating Dance for Tender Grass"	Unknown	Jack Morse	February 11, 1970
Bronson and Native American Boise Idaho (Eddie Little Sky) both vie for the attention of beautiful Tender Grass (Buffy Sainte-Marie) by entering a cross-country motorcycle race. At first, Bronson is against the idea, but after constant provoking by Boise Idaho and his nefarious accomplices, Spare Parts One (Ivan Naranjo) and Spare Parts Two (Kim Kahana), he decides to prove his courage and impress Tender Grass in the process. Song: "The Piney Wood Hills" (sung by Buffy Sainte-Marie).
21	"The Mountain"	Unknown	Meyer Dolinsky	February 18, 1970
The elder Wilson Ford (James Whitmore) is a renowned novelist with a secret that motivates him to act with abandon. In order to hone his writing skills and to prove his mettle, he constantly puts his courage to trial by performing daring, bold, and often foolish acts. Against his wife's wishes, Ford cajoles Bronson into a mountain hike that pits Ford against a youthful Bronson in a dangerous trek.
22	"Still Waters"	Unknown	Story by : Teddi Sherman & Robert Malcolm Young; Teleplay by : Ben Masselink & Robert Malcolm Young	February 25, 1970
Harve Traine (John Colicos), publisher of The Pacific Grove Press, warns his community in a series of editorials about the ecological havoc industrial pollution is causing the local bay and surrounding ocean. Parochial financial concerns who advertise with Harve's newspaper cause Harve emotional hardship and possible financial disaster. His daughter, Petey Traine (Veronica Cartwright) and Jim Bronson both believe in Harve's cause. Does Harve stick to his editorial guns and face monetary ruin, or does he acquiesce to the wishes of his advertisers and in the process lose the respect of his daughter and Bronson? Songs: "Softly And Tenderly" (Parks), "Still Waters" (sung by John Bahler).
23	"The Forest Primeval"	Unknown	Thomas Y. Drake & Jon Edward Manson	March 4, 1970
In this environmental narrative, Bronson takes a ride in the Los Padres National Forest and runs into trouble after his motorcycle falls down an embankment. Bronson decides to ride out of the forest by following the contour of the terrain. In the process, the trip imbues Bronson with a deep respect for nature and the environment.
24	"The Ninety-Nine Mile Circle"	Unknown	Susan Harris & Lisabeth Hush	March 11, 1970
Much like the vagabond Bronson, widower Isadore Katz (David Burns) left his business in New York City and took to the road in a camper to experience new realities and meet new people. Bronson helps Isadore when he runs out of gas but later it is Isadore who helps Bronson after his bike needs repairs. In the process they share the beauty of the terrain and a friendship develops. Songs: "Every Time", "Tomorrow Calls My Name" (both sung by Gary Jayson).
25	"The Mary R"	Unknown	Marvin Walkenstein	March 25, 1970
Bronson helps his uncle Herman (Gerald S. O'Loughlin) and his cousin Carl (Bob Random) repair and restore a fishing boat. Carl is passionate about restoring the boat because it reminds him of his late mother yet Uncle Herman would prefer to sell the boat. When Beth (Beverly Garland), Herman's fiancée, demands that Herman choose between the boat or her, it forces Herman to make a decision. Songs: "Mary R", "Sail On" (both sung by Gary Jayson).
26	"What's an Ark Without Centaurs?"	Unknown	Nancy Skiba	April 1, 1970
Gus Samos (Morgan Woodward) hires Bronson to work on his yacht. Samos and his daughter Vhea (Anjanette Comer) are not communicating well because of their conflicting lifestyles and values. When Vhea leaves to see friends in a Buddhist community, Bronson follows her. In the process both father and daughter question his motivations. Songs: "My Lady's A Wild Flying Dove" (Parks), but never released by him on any single, LP or CD.

== Home media ==
The pilot telefilm was made available on DVD as a part of the Warner Archives collection from Warner Bros. on November 17, 2009.

== Awards ==
- Episode #10, "Two Percent of Nothing" (guest-starring Steve Ihnat and Pat Quinn) written by D. C. Fontana, was nominated for the Writers Guild Award.

== Other media ==
Three tie-in novels with original stories were published during the show's run: Then Came Bronson by William Johnston, and Then Came Bronson #2: The Ticket and Then Came Bronson #3: Rock! by Chris Stratton.

MPC released a model kit "Bronson Motorcycle Custom Harley-Davidson Sportster" in 1970 in 1/8 Scale.

== In popular culture ==
The series was parodied by Pat Paulsen in a running sketch, "Then Came Paulsen", on Pat Paulsen's Half a Comedy Hour. Paulsen's motorcycle had training wheels.

The series was also satirized by Mad magazine in a piece titled "Then Came Bombsome", which portrayed Parks smoking atop his Harley in the iconic opening scene at the San Francisco stoplight: "Takin' a trip"? "No, this is a regular cigarette I'm smoking."

Then Came Bronson has also been referenced numerous times on the film-mocking TV series Mystery Science Theater 3000, usually in a scene featuring a lone figure riding on a motorcycle. MST3K writer Frank Conniff, who portrayed TV's Frank, is said to be a big fan of the short-lived series.
