= After the Fall (play) =

1964 play by Arthur Miller

- Original language: English
- Written by: Arthur Miller
- Characters: Quentin; Mother; Louise; Holga; Maggie; Father
- Setting: New York

Premiere
- Date: January 23, 1964
- Place: ANTA Washington Square Theatre

After the Fall is a play by the American dramatist Arthur Miller.

== Productions ==
The play premiered on Broadway at the ANTA Washington Square Theatre on January 23, 1964, and closed on May 29, 1965 after 208 performances. Directed by Elia Kazan, who collaborated with Miller on the script, the cast starred Barbara Loden as Maggie and Jason Robards Jr. as Quentin, along with Ralph Meeker as Mickey, Salome Jens as Holga, and an early appearance by Faye Dunaway as Nurse.

Barbara Loden, who would become Kazan's wife in 1967, won the 1964 Tony Award for Best Featured Actress in a Play, and Jason Robards was nominated for the 1964 Tony Award for Best Actor in a Play.

In 1984, the play was revived Off-Broadway at Playhouse 91, where it ran from October 4 to December 2 that year. Directed by John Tillinger, the cast starred Frank Langella and Dianne Wiest.

In 2004, the play was revived on Broadway at the American Airlines Theatre in a Roundabout Theatre Company production from June 25 (previews) to September 12 that year. Directed by Michael Mayer, the cast starred Peter Krause and Carla Gugino. The play was nominated for the 2005 Drama Desk Award for Outstanding Set Design of a Play (Richard Hoover).

== Analysis ==
After the Fall, one of Miller's more personal plays, is a thinly veiled personal critique centered on Miller's recent divorce from Marilyn Monroe: the plot takes place inside the mind of Quentin, a New York City Jewish intellectual who decides to reexamine his life, in order to determine whether or not he should marry his most recent love, Holga.

The play has been roundly criticised by some for being too similar to Miller's actual life because Maggie's suicide is similar to the overdose death of Miller's former wife, Monroe. The feelings of the protagonist, Quentin, are often believed to be Miller's own reflections about his failed marriage.

For example, according to Sarah Bradford, in her biography America's Queen: The Life of Jacqueline Kennedy Onassis, "Jackie, who had admired Arthur Miller enough to seat him at her table at the Malraux dinner, turned on him for his betrayal of Marilyn in his play After the Fall, which opened in New York on January 23, 1964. For [Jackie Kennedy] loyalty was the ultimate test of character, and in portraying Marilyn as a self-destructive slut whom he had abandoned for her own good, Miller had dismally failed it."

== Reception ==
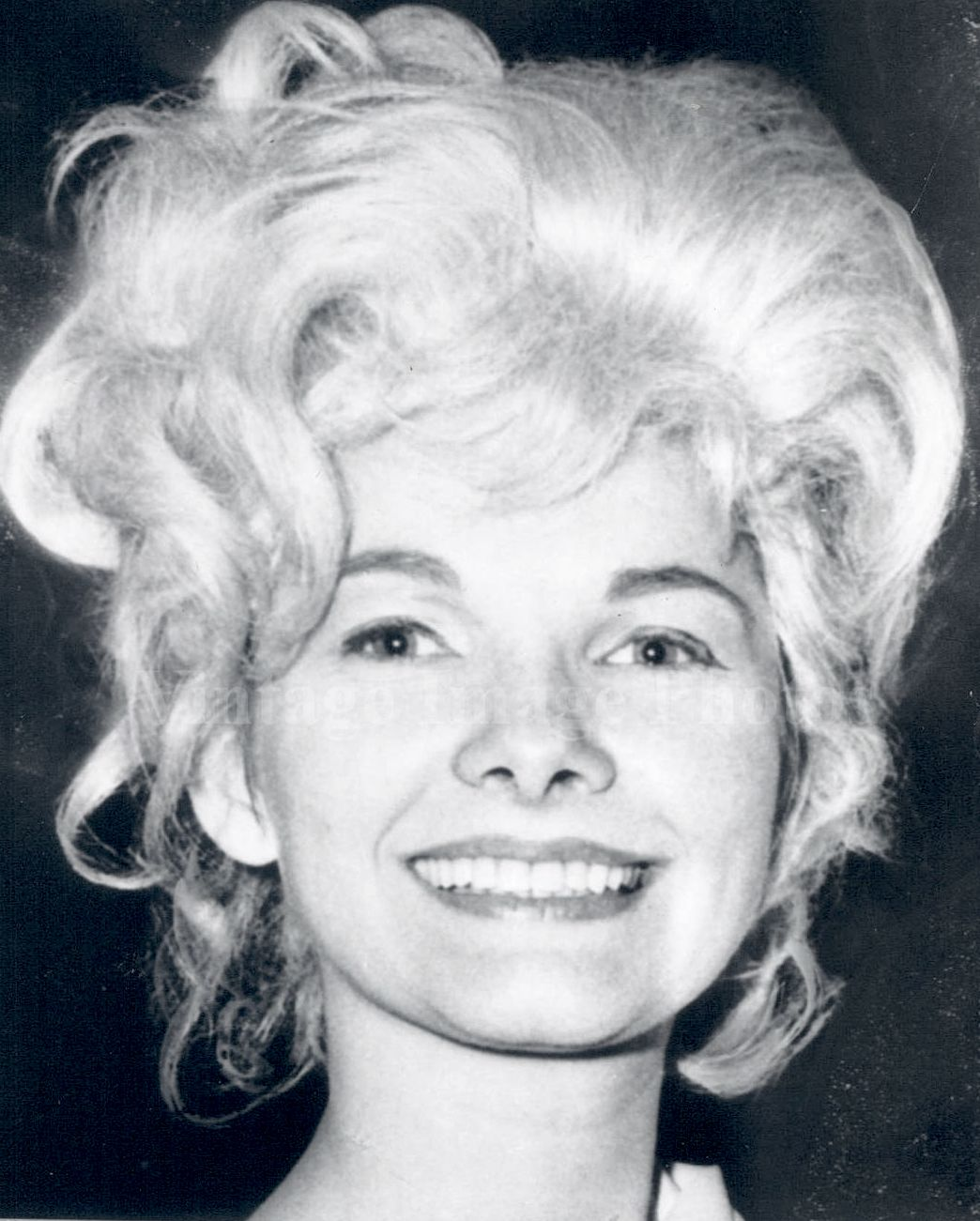
Barbara Loden (pictured in 1964) received critical acclaim for her stage performance as Maggie. She was awarded the 1964 Tony Award for Best Featured Actress in a Play.

Barbara Loden received critical acclaim for her performance as Maggie. Howard Taubman of The New York Times called Loden's performance "stunning"; he further noted she "all but enkindles the stage, in her early scenes as the warm, childlike enchantress and in her later ones as the sick, frenzied demon of allure bent on self-destruction". Earl Wilson, in a column for the San Francisco Examiner, wrote Loden "is so good as Marilyn Monroe in Arthur Miller's After the Fall that she has officially tossed her pajama tops into the ring to be the new American Sex Symbol ... and she deserves it". John Chapman of the New York Daily News called Loden's performance "magnificently played", as well noted she is "ash blonde, very beautiful and very sexy, [and] is an astonishing reminder of the late Marilyn Monroe."

A review in Time magazine called the play "endlessly fascinating, emotionally harrowing, and consumingly committed to telling the truth as Miller sees it." It also noted Kazan had charged the play "with theatrical electricity", while calling Robards Jr.'s performance as Quentin " brilliant, grueling". Hobe Morrison of Variety described After the Fall as an "almost exactly three hours of guilt confession and self-justification". In summary, he felt Miller's play is "interesting, but exhausting. In short, After the Fall is a play of contrasts and despite its faults, not to be dismissed." Claudia Cassidy was more critical of Miller's play, calling it "a three hour monolog of self-justification, with interruptions and conjurations, by a guilt-ridden man who has bad luck with women". Frank Rich reviewed a 1984 revival, in which he felt the play "is never as moving or profound as it wants to be. The play remains a collection of sporadically arresting autobiographical fragments—all floating in a glutinous interior monologue that substitutes tortuous rhetoric for psychological or metaphysical insight."

== Adaptations ==
=== Unproduced film adaptations ===
In June 1964, Miller sold the screen rights to the play to Carlo Ponti and Ira Steiner, for an estimated $500,000. Paul Newman and Ponti's wife Sophia Loren were in line to portray Quentin and Maggie. Fred Zinnemann was in discussions to direct the film. Three years later, when Miller dropped out of the Ponti project, the film rights were sold to Paramount Pictures, with Abby Mann attached to script and direct.

=== Television film ===
A television production of the play was shown in December 1974 on NBC. It starred Faye Dunaway, Christopher Plummer, Bibi Andersson, and a young Brooke Shields, and was directed by Gilbert Cates. Arthur Miller wrote the teleplay based upon his original stage play.
