= A Quality of Mercy =

- The Twilight Zone episode
- Episode no.: Season 3 Episode 15
- Directed by: Buzz Kulik
- Teleplay by: Rod Serling
- Based on: an idea by Sam Rolfe
- Production code: 4809
- Original air date: December 29, 1961

Guest appearances
- Dean Stockwell: Lt. Katell; Albert Salmi: Sgt. Causarano; Leonard Nimoy: Hansen; Rayford Barnes: Andrew Watkins; Ralph Votrian: Hanachek; Dale Ishimoto: Sgt. Yamazaki

Episode chronology
← Previous "Five Characters in Search of an Exit"	Next → "Nothing in the Dark"
- The Twilight Zone (1959 TV series) (season 3)

"A Quality of Mercy" is episode 80 of the American television anthology series The Twilight Zone, which originally aired on December 29, 1961. The title is taken from a notable speech in William Shakespeare's The Merchant of Venice, quoted in Serling's closing narration at the end of the episode.

== Opening narration ==
It's August, 1945, the last grimy pages of a dirty, torn book of war. The place is the Philippine Islands. The men are what's left of a platoon of American infantry, whose dulled and tired eyes set deep in dulled and tired faces can now look toward a miracle, that moment when the nightmare appears to be coming to an end. But they've got one more battle to fight, and in a moment we'll observe that battle. August, 1945, Philippine Islands. But in reality, it's high noon in the Twilight Zone.

== Plot ==
On August 6, 1945, Second Lieutenant Katell arrives in the South West Pacific theatre of World War II and takes command of a seasoned but war-weary infantry platoon led by Sergeant Causarano. Katell promptly orders an attack on a group of sick and wounded Japanese soldiers holed up in a cave. Causarano tries to talk him out of it, as everyone is sick of fighting and attacking the defenseless Japanese soldiers would achieve nothing but unnecessary deaths for both sides. But Katell, intent on proving himself and earning his rank, stands firm on his orders; he berates the platoon for their lack of enthusiasm and tells Causarano he does not care who the enemy is or how much of a threat they pose, only that they will kill all of them until they are ordered to stop killing, simply because they are the enemy. Causarano and the platoon reluctantly prepare for the assault.

As Katell surveils the cave, he accidentally drops his binoculars. When he goes to retrieve them, he suddenly finds himself surrounded by an Imperial Japanese Army company. After a failed attempt to flee in his confusion, Katell is briefed on the situation by Sergeant Yamazaki: he is Lieutenant Yamuri, on Corregidor on May 4, 1942 during the Philippines campaign, and his company is preparing to assault a group of wounded 3rd U.S. Infantry Regiment soldiers holed up in a cave. Yamuri tries to dissuade the company's captain from ordering the attack, arguing that the Americans inside the cave pose no threat and can be captured or bypassed instead, but the company's captain bluntly refuses to listen and, suspecting Yamuri has malaria or lost his nerve, "reminds" him that it does not matter whether the enemy is incapacitated or how their deaths will not shorten the war, only that they will kill all of them until they are ordered to stop killing—mirroring exactly what Katell told Causarano. The captain then relieves Yamuri of command and leads the company to attack the cave.

Horrified, Yamuri reaches for his binoculars and finds himself back as Katell in 1945, just as the platoon's radioman relays that the atomic bomb has been dropped and that they have been ordered to fall back and wait to see how Japan responds. As the platoon cheerfully withdraws, Causarano sardonically assures Katell, "Well, I wouldn't fret. There'll be other caves, and other wars, other human beings you can knock off." As Katell somberly stares at the cave, he responds, "I hope not. God help us, I hope not."

== Closing narration ==
'The quality of mercy is not strained, it droppeth as the gentle rain from heaven upon the place beneath. It blesseth him that gives and him that takes.' Shakespeare, The Merchant of Venice, but applicable to any moment in time, to any group of soldiery, to any nation on the face of the Earth—or, as in this case, to the Twilight Zone.

== Cast ==
- Dean Stockwell as Lt. Katell/Lt. Yamuri
- Albert Salmi as Sgt. Causarano
- Rayford Barnes as Andrew J. Watkins
- Ralph Votrian as Hanacheck
- Leonard Nimoy as Hansen
- Dale Ishimoto as Sergeant Yamazaki
- J. H. Fujikawa as Japanese Captain

== Production ==
This episode was filmed on a sound stage at Hal Roach Studios, instead of the usual MGM facilities.

The episode's writer, Rod Serling, served as a paratrooper in the Philippines during World War II, as part of the U.S. Army's 11th Airborne Division.

== Bibliography ==
- DeVoe, Bill (2008). Trivia from The Twilight Zone. Albany, GA: Bear Manor Media. ISBN 978-1-59393-136-0.
- Grams, Martin (2008). The Twilight Zone: Unlocking the Door to a Television Classic. Churchville, MD: OTR Publishing. ISBN 978-0-9703310-9-0.
- Zicree, Marc Scott (1982). The Twilight Zone Companion. Sillman-James Press, 1982 (2nd edition).
