= The Four of Us Are Dying =

- The Twilight Zone episode
- Episode no.: Season 1 Episode 13
- Directed by: John Brahm
- Teleplay by: Rod Serling
- Based on: "All of Us Are Dying" by George Clayton Johnson
- Production code: 173-3618
- Original air date: January 1, 1960

Guest appearances
- Harry Townes as Arch Hammer; Ross Martin as Johnny Foster; Phillip Pine as Virgil Sterig; Don Gordon as Andy Marshak; Peter Brocco as Mr. Marshak; Milton Frome as Detective; Beverly Garland as Maggie

Episode chronology
← Previous "What You Need"	Next → "Third from the Sun"
- The Twilight Zone (1959 TV series, season 1)

"The Four of Us Are Dying" is the thirteenth episode of the American television anthology series The Twilight Zone. It originally aired on CBS on January 1, 1960. The episode was based on the original short story by George Clayton Johnson, "All of Us Are Dying", which had not been published at the time. The story subsequently appeared in the October 1961 issue of Rogue.

== Opening narration ==
His name is Arch Hammer, he's 36 years old. He's been a salesman, a dispatcher, a truck driver, a con man, a bookie, and a part-time bartender. This is a cheap man, a nickel-and-dime man, with a cheapness that goes past the suit and the shirt; a cheapness of mind, a cheapness of taste, a tawdry little shine on the seat of his conscience, and a dark-room squint at a world whose sunlight has never gotten through to him. But Mr. Hammer has a talent, discovered at a very early age. This much he does have. He can make his face change. He can twitch a muscle, move a jaw, concentrate on the cast of his eyes, and he can change his face. He can change it into anything he wants. Mr. Archie Hammer, jack-of-all-trades, has just checked in at three-eighty a night, with two bags, some newspaper clippings, a most odd talent, and a master plan to destroy some lives.

== Plot ==
Arch Hammer is a con man who can change his face to look like anyone he chooses. He walks into a nightclub, where he impersonates deceased trumpeter Johnny Foster to steal Foster's grieving girlfriend Maggie, a sultry songstress.

Next, while impersonating murdered gangster Virgil Sterig, Hammer pays a visit to Mr. Pennell, to extort money; Pennell is the man who had Sterig killed. Pennell sends his men after Hammer.

Trying to escape down an alley, Hammer sees a poster of boxer Andy Marshak, and changes his face to the fighter's. Pennell's men are fooled. Thinking he is in the clear, he runs into Marshak's father at a street newsstand, who mistakes him for the son who broke his mother's heart and "did dirt to a sweet decent little girl who would've cut off an arm for him." As Mr. Marshak reels off the reasons why he hates Andy and his punk behavior, Hammer pushes the old man out of the way and returns to his hotel room. A detective comes by to pick him up for questioning; together, they leave for the police station. As they enter the hotel's revolving door, Hammer again assumes the boxer's appearance. The detective rushes back into the building to find Hammer.

Marshak's father is standing on the street, with a gun on Hammer. The con man tries to demonstrate that he is not who the old man thinks he is, but before he can concentrate and change his face, Mr. Marshak shoots him. As Hammer lies dying, his face shifts from one person to another until he dies wearing his own face.

== Closing narration ==
He was Arch Hammer, a cheap little man who just checked in. He was Johnny Foster, who played a trumpet and was loved beyond words. He was Virgil Sterig, with money in his pocket. He was Andy Marshak, who got some of his agony back on a sidewalk in front of a cheap hotel. Hammer, Foster, Sterig, Marshak—and all four of them were dying.

== Production ==
"After the first half-dozen stories had been written, part of the hustle was getting an agent. Through those years I found several who would let me use their names, though few cared to sign a contract with me. One of these men, Jay Richards - at the time head of the television department of the Famous Artists Agency, long since absorbed by I.F.A. (International Famous Agency), and since embedded in I.C.M. (International Creative Management), which represents me now in television and movies - agreed to read something. I showed Jay 'All of Us Are Dying.' After reading it, he crossed out the title with a ballpoint pen and wrote in 'Rubberface!' Then he sent it to Rod Serling, who had a new series that season called The Twilight Zone." — George Clayton Johnson, writing in the August 1981 issue of The Twilight Zone Magazine

In 2005, "The Four of Us Are Dying" was produced for the stage by 4 Letter Entertainment.
