= The Hitter (film) =

- Theatrical release poster
- Directed by: Christopher Leitch
- Screenplay by: Christopher Leitch; Ben Harris
- Produced by: Gary Herman; Christopher Leitch
- Starring: Ron O'Neal; Sheila Frazier; Adolph Caesar; Bill Cobbs; Dorothi Fox; Alfie Brown
- Cinematography: Jacques Haitkin
- Edited by: Robert M. Reitano
- Music by: Garfeel Ruff
- Production companies: Kaleidoscope Films; Adgo Productions
- Distributed by: Peppercorn-Wormser Film Enterprises
- Release date: February 1979
- Running time: 80 minutes
- Country: United States
- Language: English

The Hitter is a 1979 American blaxploitation action film directed by Christopher Leitch and written by Christopher Leitch and Ben Harris. The film stars Ron O'Neal, Sheila Frazier, Adolph Caesar, Bill Cobbs, Dorothi Fox and Alfie Brown. The film was released in February 1979, by Peppercorn-Wormser Film Enterprises.

== Plot ==
An ex-professional boxer who killed a man in the ring tries to make a new start when teaming up with a fast talking but ageing hoodlum and an ex-call girl but soon get more than they bargained for when crossing an adversary from their past.

== Cast ==
- Ron O'Neal as Otis
- Sheila Frazier as Lola
- Adolph Caesar as Nathan
- Bill Cobbs as "Louisiana Slim"
- Dorothi Fox as Mabel
- Alfie Brown as Sadie
- Percy Thomas as Bootblack
- Dana Terrell as Charlotte
- Dee Porter as Gretchen
- Gidget Pascale as Lucille
- Carla Ness as Esther
- Roux Forrest as Roux
- Lisa Venables as Bridgette
