= Love and Marriage (1959 TV series) =

- Genre: Situation comedy
- Starring: William Demarest; Jeanne Bal; Murray Hamilton; Kay Armen; Stubby Kaye
- Opening theme: "Love and Marriage" by Frank Sinatra
- Country of origin: United States
- Original language: English
- No. of seasons: 1
- No. of episodes: 26 (8 unaired)

Production
- Producer: P. J. Wolfson
- Running time: ca. 26 mins
- Production company: Louis F. Edelman Enterprises

Original release
- Network: NBC
- Release: September 21, 1959 – January 25, 1960

Clockwise from lower right: William Demarest, Jeanne Bal, Stubby Kaye, and Murray Hamilton in Love and Marriage.

Love and Marriage is an American sitcom that aired on NBC during the 1959–60 television season. The series stars William Demarest as the owner of a struggling music publishing company.

== Synopsis ==
Bill Harris is a widower who owns the Harris Music Publishing Company in Los Angeles, California. A longtime music publisher and a lover of old-fashioned, melodious music, he hates the rock and roll music that has become popular during the latter half of the 1950s and rejects most of the popular songs submitted to him. As a result, his company is nearly bankrupt, and stress over its financial problems is affecting his health. Bill′s daughter, Pat Baker, wants to keep an eye on him as well as save the family business by convincing Bill that he is wrong about rock and roll and should publish it, so she maneuvers him into taking her on as a partner in the company. She then tries to sign rock and roll musicians with the company and get Bill to publish their music.

Bill shares an apartment with Pat, her husband Steve Baker, who is a lawyer, and their daughters Susan and Jennie. Steve is more progressive than Bill and constantly irritates him, and Susan has to mediate the frequent disputes between them. At the publishing company, Sophie is the secretary and Stubby Kaye is the firm′s song promoter. Stubby performs most of the songs submitted to the firm and is prone to reminiscing about the "good old days" in the music publishing business.

Late in 1959, the Bakers hire a Chinese woman, Han Cho-Yee. as their housekeeper, and a Chinese songwriter, Jimmy Chang, falls in love with her. Jimmy faces the challenge of dealing with Han′s father, Mr. Cho-Yee, a strict man who has set up an arranged marriage to someone else for Han.

== Cast ==
- William Demarest as William "Bill" Harris
- Jeanne Bal as Patricia "Pat" Baker
- Murray Hamilton as Steve Baker
- Kay Armen as Sophie
- Stubby Kaye as Stubby Wilson
- Susan Reilly as Susan Baker
- Jennie Lynn as Jennie Baker
- Robert Kino as Jimmy Chang
- Judy Dan as Han Cho-Yee
- Benson Fong as Mr. Cho-Yee

== Production ==
Love and Marriage was a production of Louis F. Edelman Enterprises. P. J. Wolfson produced the show. Directors included Bob Sweeney and Norman Abbott. Mel Shavelson was one of the writers. Noxzema Cream sponsored alternate weeks, with the remaining episodes being sustaining,

Love and Marriage replaced The Restless Gun. The theme song was an instrumental of "Love and Marriage."

== Broadcast history ==
Love and Marriage premiered on NBC on September 21, 1959. It lasted only half a season, and only 18 episodes were broadcast, the last of them on January 25, 1960. Another eight episodes never aired. The show was broadcast at 8:00 p.m. Eastern Time on Mondays throughout its run.

== Episodes ==
Note: Episode lists for Love and Marriage place the episode "The Baby Sitter" on January 11, 1960, and the episode "Jealousy" among the show′s unaired episodes. At least one contemporary newspaper listing indicates that "The Baby Sitter" was broadcast on January 11, 1960. However, at least three contemporary newspaper listings indicate that "Jealousy" aired on January 11, 1960.

| No. | Title | Directed by | Written by | Original release date |
|---|---|---|---|---|
| 1 | "House of Harris" | Unknown | Unknown | September 21, 1959 |
Feeling that Bill's business and health are failing, Pat takes his affairs in hand.
| 2 | "The Stockholders" | Unknown | Unknown | September 28, 1959 |
Bill takes on a new composer at the Harris Music Publishing Company, and it nearly ruins the firm when the composer refuses to write music, claiming that his estranged wife and her lawyers take almost everything he earns from him.
| 3 | "Second Honeymoon" | Bob Sweeney | David Adler, Laurence Marks, and P. J. Wolfson | October 5, 1959 |
Pat has to see a barbershop quartet contest, interfering with the celebration of her wedding anniversary — and she finds that her time-consuming interest in Bill's company is threatening her marriage. Guest stars: The Mellomen
| 4 | "Stubby Picks a Winner" | Unknown | Unknown | October 12, 1959 |
After Stubby gives an unemployed composer a loan, the composer repays him by giving him a song. Stubby thinks the song will be a hit — and comes up with a scheme to get it published. Guest stars: Herb Vigran and Ray Walker.
| 5 | "Child of Capricorn" | Unknown | Unknown | October 19, 1959 |
An unconventional songwriter from the hills throws the household into an uproar.
| 6 | "Guest Artist" | Unknown | Unknown | October 26, 1959 |
Bill schemes to get Pat out of his business and back into her home. Guest star: Sonny Burke.
| 7 | "Sophie's Engagement" | Unknown | Unknown | November 2, 1959 |
Sophie delights her fellow employees when she announces her engagement, and as a wedding gift for the couple, Bill agrees to publish a song that her fiancé wrote.
| 8 | "The Big Hit" | Unknown | Unknown | November 9, 1959 |
After Stubby rearranges a song Steve wrote and Sophie sings it on television, it becomes a big hit.
| 9 | "Jordan Catalogue" | Unknown | Unknown | November 16, 1959 |
Bill goes back to courting an old flame in an effort to gain a renewal of a collection of hit songs.
| 10 | "Chip Off The Old Block" | Unknown | Unknown | November 23, 1959 |
The members of the Vaudeville Club talk Bill into presenting a benefit show featuring children.
| 11 | "Bill Moves Out" | Unknown | Unknown | November 30, 1959 |
After several minor disagreements, Bill and Steve have a serious argument, prompting Bill to decide to move out of the apartment and live by himself.
| 12 | "The New Housekeeper" | Unknown | Unknown | December 14, 1959 |
Bill and Steve argue over the cleanliness of the apartment, how best to keep it clean, and domestic help.
| 13 | "The Baby" | Bob Sweeney | Unknown | December 21, 1959 |
The birth of a baby puts the household into turmoil — and when Bill holds a jam session in the apartment, the noise upsets Steve, who demands that the music stop.
| 14 | "Hans Get Discovered" | Unknown | Unknown | December 28, 1959 |
When Han's precocious 11-year old son and Bill appear as co-contestants on a question-and-answer television program about classical music, the boy demonstrates a tremendous amount of knowledge of the subject, and the positive publicity that follows swells his ego.
| 15 | "Steve's Song" | Bob Sweeney | Unknown | January 4, 1960 |
Bill arranges a birthday surprise for Steve that makes Steve "go Hollywood" and consider quitting his law practice.
| 16 | "The Baby Sitter (see note)" | Unknown | Unknown | January 11, 1960 or UNAIRED (see note) |
Bill is dissatisfied with children minding his granddaughter and winds up babysitting her himself.
| 17 | "Jennie's Song" | Unknown | Unknown | January 18, 1960 |
Bill tries to help his granddaughter write a song for a first-grade competition, but his effort backfires.
| 18 | "Stubby's Big Chance" | Unknown | Unknown | January 25, 1960 |
Bill hires a hotshot youngster and forces Stubby to resign and improve himself — but Stubby nonetheless refuses to accept a better job from a rival publisher out of loyalty to Bill, and Pat and Steve come up with a scheme to reunite Bill and Stubby.
| 19 | "Mother-in-Law" | Norman Abbott | TBD | UNAIRED |
| 20 | "Man in the Park" | TBD | TBD | UNAIRED |
| 21 | "Jealousy (see note)" | Unknown | Unknown | January 11, 1960 or UNAIRED (see note) |
Pat decides to see if Steve will be jealous if she has a date with Caesar Romero. Unknown to her, Steve finds out and cooks up a counterplot with Caesar and Bill. Guest star: Cesar Romero.
| 22 | "Tax Man" | Norman Abbott | TBD | UNAIRED |
| 23 | "A Slight Case of Cyrano" | TBD | TBD | UNAIRED |
Alternative title "A Slight Touch of Cyrano."
| 24 | "The School Problem" | Norman Abbott | TBD | UNAIRED |
| 25 | "The Girl from Hong Kong" | Norman Abbott | TBD | UNAIRED |
| 26 | "Regards to Broadway" | Norman Abbott | TBD | UNAIRED |
Alternative title "Give My Regards to Broadway."
