= Jeanne Bal =

American actress and model (1928–1996)

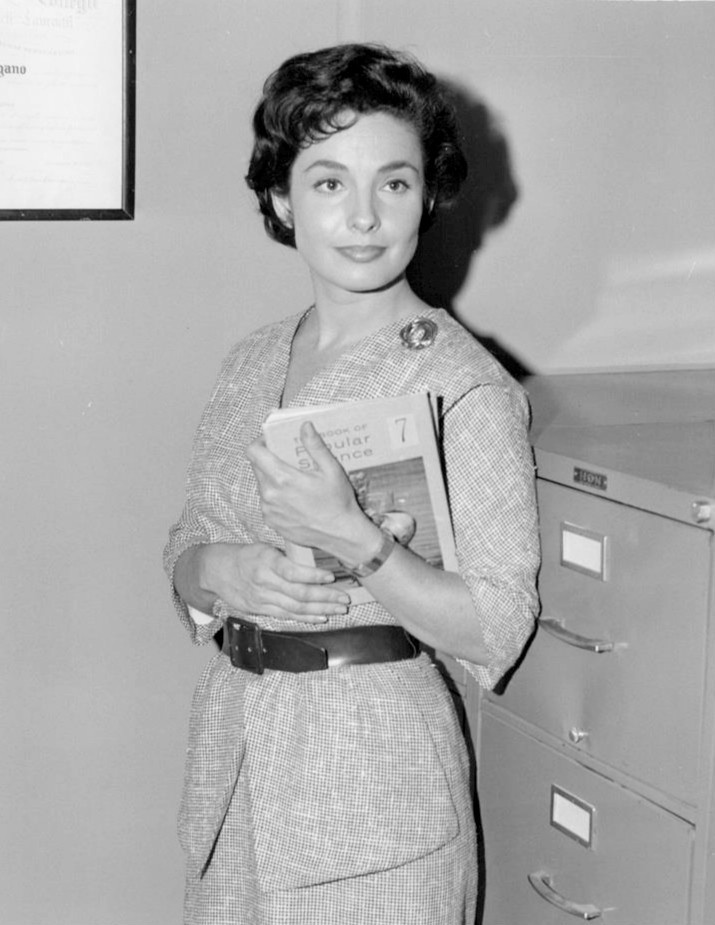
- Bal as Jean Pagano in Mr. Novak.
- Born: May 3, 1928; Santa Monica, California, U.S.
- Died: April 30, 1996 (aged 67); Sherman Oaks, California, U.S.
- Occupation: Actress
- Years active: 1955–1971
- Spouses: Ross Bowman (m. 1953; div. 1956); Edward Lee (m. 1963; died 1992)

Jeanne Bal (May 3, 1928 – April 30, 1996) was an American actress and model who worked primarily in 1960s television.

== Early years ==
A Chicago native, Bal was an only child, the daughter of Joseph Peter Bal (1899–1981), a Monogram Pictures scenic designer, and Bessie Lee Bozeman Bal (1902–1967). She was raised in California, attending high school and junior college in Santa Monica. She worked as a fashion model for a year and a half.

== Career ==
Bal was a regular cast member on the ABC comedy Sid Caesar Invites You (1958). In the 1959–60 season, she featured in the short-lived NBC sitcom Love and Marriage as Pat Baker, the business partner of her father (William Demarest), the founder of a failing music publishing company.

In 1961, Bal became a regular on the sitcom Bachelor Father, but left shortly afterwards. Her other television credits include four appearances on Perry Mason, including the role of Dr. Linda Carey in the 1962 episode, "The Case of the Angry Astronaut", and murder victim Vera Wynne in the 1965 episode, "The Case of the Telltale Tap". In 1963, she guest-starred as Melissa, an overly ambitious saloon girl, on Bonanza in the episode "The Saga of Whizzer McGee." Bal also appeared in guest roles on Wagon Train, Riverboat, and I Spy. In "The Man Trap" (1966), the very first episode of the original Star Trek series, she played a lethal shape-shifting alien who craves salt.

On Mr. Novak Bal portrayed Assistant Vice Principal Jean Pagano during the 1963–64 season. Initially, plans called for increasing her role for the 1964–65 season, promoting her to second billing on the show, but the producer instead cut the number of episodes in which she was to appear. The result was that she left the program.

Bal's first stage appearance came in Gypsy Lady. She also appeared on Broadway in the musical The Gay Life, introducing the song "Why Go Anywhere at All?" During the run, Bal was given a different song to sing in the same spot, "You're Not the Type".

Her other Broadway credits include Call Me Madam (1950), Great to Be Alive! (1950), and Alive and Kicking (1950). She also toured the United States in productions of Guys and Dolls and South Pacific, among other shows.

== Personal life ==
In 1953, Bal married Ross Bowman, a stage manager for the show in which she was appearing. The pair divorced in 1956. Her second husband was attorney Edward Richard Lee. They were married from 1963 until his death in 1992. Their son Michael was born in 1965.

== Death ==
Bal died three days before her 68th birthday from metastasized breast cancer.

== Filmography ==
- Matt Lincoln
  - episode Nina
- Company of Killers (1970) — as Patricia Cahill
- I Spy
  - episode Happy Birthday... Everybody — as Shirl Mathews
- McHale's Navy
  - episode The Great Necklace Caper — as Nurse Edith Crawford
- Hey, Landlord
  - episode Instant Family — as Leslie Barton
- Star Trek: The Original Series
  - S1:E1 The Man Trap — as Nancy Crater
- Perry Mason
  - episode The Case of the Wrathful Wraith — as Rosemary Welch
  - episode The Case of the Telltale Tap — as Vera Wynne
  - episode The Case of the Angry Astronaut — as Linda Carey
  - episode The Case of the Misguided Missile — as Helen Rand
- Karen
  - episode Teacher's Romance — as Georgia Grey
- The Fugitive
  - episode Tiger Left, Tiger Right — as Laura Pryor
- Wagon Train
  - episode Alias Bill Hawks — as Alice Wells
- Bonanza
  - episode The Saga of Whizzer McGee — as Melissa
- The Dick Powell Show
  - episode The Third Side of the Coin — as Miriam Kent
- Tales of Wells Fargo
  - episode Remember the Yazoo — as Annette Decatur
- Bachelor Father — as Suzanne Collins (1961)
- Checkmate
  - episode State of Shock — as Yvonne Lurie
- Route 66
  - episode An Effigy in Snow — as Penny Foster
- Boris Karloff's Thriller
  - episode Papa Benjamin — as Judy Wilson
- Riverboat
  - episode Listen to the Nightingale — as Julie Lang
- Letter to Loretta — Herself/host (1960) (NBC Playhouse version)
- Diagnosis: Unknown
  - episode The Parasite — as Dorothy Gordon
