= Throwaway line =

Comedic element

In comedy, a throwaway line (also: throwaway joke or throwaway gag) is a joke delivered "in passing" without being the punch line to a comedy routine, part of the build up to another joke, or (in the context of drama) there to advance a story or develop a character. Throwaway lines are often one-liners, or in-jokes, and often delivered in a deadpan manner.

Similarly, in theater, a throwaway line is one uttered by a character where the only intended reaction is that of from the audience. Oftentimes, these lines may be references to other shows or media that only the audience are aware of. This is different from breaking the fourth wall because the line is not directed at the audience; however the other characters onstage will generally proceed as if nothing has been said, or that nothing of value was said.

In comic strips (Sunday comics in particular) throwaway gags are often placed in the throwaway panels of the comic, and are located there so that removing the throwaway panels for space reasons will not destroy the narrative of the central comic.

In fiction, a line intended originally as a throwaway line in one episode may later be retconned by being incorporated into the backstory of the main drama, and used to develop the longer-term plot. As an example, in the second season of the American television series Breaking Bad, the character Saul Goodman, after being kidnapped and threatened at gunpoint by a masked Walter White and Jesse Pinkman, tries to defuse the situation by blaming an unseen person named "Ignacio" and referencing someone named "Lalo". The two are never mentioned again in the series, but Ignacio "Nacho" Varga and Lalo Salamanca were later written into full-fledged characters in the spin-off/prequel series Better Call Saul, produced several years later.
