= The Twilight Zone (radio series) =

2002–2012 radio drama series

- Genre: Anthology; Fantasy; Horror; Science fiction
- Running time: 40 minutes
- Country of origin: United States
- Language: English
- Starring: Various
- Announcer: Doug James
- Created by: Carl Amari
- Written by: Dennis Etchison
- Directed by: Roger Wolski
- Narrated by: Stacy Keach
- Original release: October 2002 – 2012
- No. of seasons: 18
- No. of episodes: 176

The Twilight Zone is a nationally syndicated radio drama series featuring radio play adaptations of the classic 1959–1964 television series The Twilight Zone. The series was produced for the British digital radio station BBC Radio 4 Extra airing for 176 episodes between October 2002 and 2012. In the United States, it aired on nearly 200 radio stations including WCCO, KSL, KOA, WIND, XM Satellite Radio channel 163 and Sirius XM Book Radio. Most of the stations aired two episodes each week, usually on the weekends and many times back to back.

Many of the stories are based on Rod Serling's scripts from the original Twilight Zone series, and are slightly expanded and updated to reflect contemporary technology and trends and the lack of a visual component. In addition to adapting all of the original episodes aired on the TV series, the radio series also adapted some Twilight Zone TV scripts that were never produced, scripts from other Serling TV productions, and new stories written especially for the radio series. Taking Serling's role as narrator is Stacy Keach.

Different Hollywood actors, such as Blair Underwood and Jim Caviezel, take the lead role in each radio drama. In addition, several stars who appeared on the original TV series, such as H.M. Wynant, Orson Bean and Morgan Brittany, appear, although purposely not in the roles they originated on television. The series features a full cast, music and sound effects and is produced in the flavor of classic radio dramas but using today's technology. In addition to being an homage to the original Twilight Zone TV series, the radio dramas pay tribute to the era of classic radio drama, including allusions to radio dramas such as Gunsmoke, the presence of radio legend Stan Freberg in many episodes, and the sons (Stacy Keach, Ed Begley Jr.) of radio drama personalities Stacy Keach Sr. and Ed Begley as stars in the series.

Licensed by CBS Enterprises and The Rod Serling Estate, The Twilight Zone radio series is produced by Carl Amari, CEO of Falcon Picture Group who hosts his own weekly nationally syndicated radio series, featuring classic radio, called Hollywood 360. The scripts from the original Twilight Zone were adapted by Dennis Etchison and others, including one episode by Chas Holloway and several by British writer M. J. Elliott. New stories by Etchison and others that are not based on the original TV series are also featured.

The sound mix was produced at Falcon Picture Group studios and later at the Cerny Sound-to-Picture studio at Cerny American Creative in Chicago. The sound engineers that worked on the series include Roger Wolski, Bob Benson, Craig Lee, Tim Cerny and Jason Rizzo. The episodes were produced and directed by Carl Amari.

== Episodes ==
The following episodes include stories that were adapted for radio from the original Twilight Zone television scripts, as well as original stories produced exclusively for this radio series.

=== Volume 1 (2002) ===
No. in overall	No. in season	Title	Starring	Adapted for radio by	Originally written by
1	1	"A Kind of a Stopwatch"	Lou Diamond Phillips	Dennis Etchison	Rod Serling (Note: Based on a story by Michael D. Rosenthal)
2	2	"The Lateness of the Hour"	Jane Seymour and James Keach	Dennis Etchison	Rod Serling
3	3	"The Thirty-Fathom Grave"	Blair Underwood	Dennis Etchison	Rod Serling
4	4	"The Man in the Bottle"	Ed Begley Jr.	Dennis Etchison	Rod Serling
5	5	"The Night of the Meek"	Christopher McDonald	Dennis Etchison	Rod Serling
6	6	"The After Hours"	Kim Fields	Dennis Etchison	Rod Serling
7	7	"Mr. Dingle, the Strong"	Tim Kazurinsky	Dennis Etchison	Rod Serling
8	8	"A Stop at Willoughby"	Chelcie Ross	Dennis Etchison	Rod Serling
9	9	"The Lonely"	Mike Starr	Dennis Etchison	Rod Serling
10	10	"Of Late I Think of Cliffordville"	H. M. Wynant	Dennis Etchison	Rod Serling (Note: Based on the short story "Blind Alley" by Malcolm Jameson)

=== Volume 2 (2003) ===
No. in overall	No. in season	Title	Starring	Adapted for radio by	Originally written by
11	1	"The Obsolete Man"	Jason Alexander	Dennis Etchison	Rod Serling
12	2	"The Bard"	John Ratzenberger & Stacy Keach	Dennis Etchison	Rod Serling
13	3	"Back There"	Jim Caviezel	Dennis Etchison	Rod Serling
14	4	"A Short Drink From a Certain Fountain"	Adam West	Dennis Etchison	Rod Serling (Note: Based on a story by Lou Holz)
15	5	"Nervous Man in a Four Dollar Room"	Adam Baldwin	Dennis Etchison	Rod Serling
16	6	"The Monsters Are Due on Maple Street"	Frank John Hughes	Dennis Etchison	Rod Serling
17	7	"Mr. Garrity and the Graves"	Christopher McDonald	Dennis Etchison	Rod Serling (Note: Based on a story by Mike Korologos)
18	8	"Escape Clause"	Mike Starr	Dennis Etchison	Rod Serling
19	9	"Four O'Clock"	Stan Freberg	Dennis Etchison	Rod Serling (Note: Based on a story by Price Day)
20	10	"Uncle Simon"	Peter Mark Richman & Beverly Garland	Dennis Etchison	Rod Serling

=== Volume 3 (2003) ===
No. in overall	No. in season	Title	Starring	Adapted for radio by	Originally written by
21	1	"The Fear"	Jane Seymour and James Keach	Dennis Etchison	Rod Serling
22	2	"The Parallel"	Lou Diamond Phillips	Dennis Etchison	Rod Serling
23	3	"A Hundred Yards Over the Rim"	Jim Caviezel	Dennis Etchison	Rod Serling
24	4	"One for the Angels"	Ed Begley Jr.	Dennis Etchison	Rod Serling
25	5	"The Midnight Sun"	Kim Fields	Dennis Etchison	Rod Serling
26	6	"The Rip Van Winkle Caper"	Tim Kazurinsky	Dennis Etchison	Rod Serling
27	7	"A Most Unusual Camera"	Mike Starr	Dennis Etchison	Rod Serling
28	8	"Twenty Two"	Andrea Evans	Dennis Etchison	Rod Serling (Note: Based on an anecdote from Bennett Cerf's "Famous Ghost Stories")
29	9	"Walking Distance"	Chelcie Ross	Dennis Etchison	Rod Serling
30	10	"The Passersby"	Morgan Brittany	Dennis Etchison	Rod Serling

=== Volume 4 (2004) ===
No. in overall	No. in season	Title	Starring	Adapted for radio by	Originally written by
31	1	"The Dummy"	Bruno Kirby	Dennis Etchison	Rod Serling (Note: Based on a story by Lee Polk)
32	2	"No Time Like the Past"	Jason Alexander	Dennis Etchison	Rod Serling
33	3	"Still Valley"	Adam West	Dennis Etchison	Rod Serling (Note: Based on a story by Manley Wade Wellman)
34	4	"King Nine Will Not Return"	Adam Baldwin	Dennis Etchison	Rod Serling
35	5	"I Am the Night—Color Me Black"	John Ratzenberger	Dennis Etchison	Rod Serling
36	6	"The Incredible World of Horace Ford"	Mike Starr	Dennis Etchison	Reginald Rose
37	7	"One More Pallbearer"	Chelcie Ross	Dennis Etchison	Rod Serling
38	8	"The Little People"	Daniel J. Travanti	Dennis Etchison	Rod Serling
39	9	"Cavender Is Coming"	Andrea Evans	Dennis Etchison	Rod Serling
40	10	"Hocus-Pocus and Frisby"	Shelley Berman	Dennis Etchison	Rod Serling (Note: Based on a story by Frederic Louis Fox)

=== Volume 5 (2004) ===
No. in overall	No. in season	Title	Starring	Adapted for radio by	Originally written by
41	1	"Living Doll"	Tim Kazurinsky	Dennis Etchison	Jerry Sohl (Note: Credited to Charles Beaumont)
42	2	"The Big Tall Wish"	Blair Underwood	Dennis Etchison	Rod Serling
43	3	"The Fever"	Stacy Keach and Kathy Garver	Dennis Etchison	Rod Serling
44	4	"The Last Night of a Jockey"	Bruno Kirby	Dennis Etchison	Rod Serling
45	5	"A Thing About Machines"	Mike Starr	Dennis Etchison	Rod Serling
46	6	"Mirror Image"	Morgan Brittany and Frank John Hughes	Dennis Etchison	Rod Serling
47	7	"The 7th Is Made Up of Phantoms"	Richard Grieco	Dennis Etchison	Rod Serling
48	8	"The Long Morrow"	Kathy Garver	Dennis Etchison	Rod Serling
49	9	"Will the Real Martian Please Stand Up?"	Richard Kind	Chaz Holloway and Dennis Etchison	Rod Serling
50	10	"The Trade-Ins"	H. M. Wynant and Peggy Webber	Dennis Etchison	Rod Serling

=== Volume 6 (2005) ===
No. in overall	No. in season	Title	Starring	Adapted for radio by	Originally written by
51	1	"Time Enough at Last"	Tim Kazurinsky	Dennis Etchison	Rod Serling (Note: Based on a short story by Lynn Venable)
52	2	"A Passage for Trumpet"	Mike Starr	Dennis Etchison	Rod Serling
53	3	"I Shot an Arrow Into the Air"	Chelcie Ross	Dennis Etchison	Rod Serling (Note: Based on a story by Madeline Champion)
54	4	"The Brain Center at Whipple's"	Stan Freberg	Dennis Etchison	Rod Serling
55	5	"The Grave"	Michael Rooker	Dennis Etchison	Montgomery Pittman
56	6	"The Hitch-Hiker"	Kate Jackson	Dennis Etchison	Rod Serling (Note: Based on the radio play by Lucille Fletcher)
57	7	"Mr. Denton on Doomsday"	Adam Baldwin	Dennis Etchison	Rod Serling
58	8	"Sounds and Silences"	Richard Kind	Dennis Etchison	Rod Serling
59	9	"The Odyssey of Flight 33"	Daniel J. Travanti	Dennis Etchison	Rod Serling
60	10	"The Changing of the Guard"	Orson Bean	Dennis Etchison	Rod Serling

=== Volume 7 (2005) ===
No. in overall	No. in season	Title	Starring	Adapted for radio by	Originally written by
61	1	"Five Characters in Search of an Exit"	Jason Alexander	Dennis Etchison	Rod Serling (Note: Based on a story by Marvin Petal)
62	2	"The Arrival"	Blair Underwood	Dennis Etchison	Rod Serling
63	3	"Queen of the Nile"	Kate Jackson	Dennis Etchison	Jerry Sohl (Note: Credited to Charles Beaumont)
64	4	"I Dream of Genie"	Hal Sparks	Dennis Etchison	John Furia Jr.
65	5	"It's a Good Life"	Mike Starr	Dennis Etchison	Rod Serling (Note: Based on a story by Jerome Bixby)
66	6	"The Masks"	Stan Freberg	Dennis Etchison	Rod Serling
67	7	"Mr. Bevis"	Bruno Kirby	Dennis Etchison	Rod Serling
68	8	"Showdown with Rance McGrew"	Christopher McDonald	Dennis Etchison	Rod Serling (Note: Based on an idea by Frederic Louis Fox)
69	9	"The Old Man in the Cave"	Adam Baldwin	Dennis Etchison	Rod Serling (Note: Based on the short story "The Old Man" by Henry Slesar)
70	10	"Ninety Years Without Slumbering"	Bill Erwin	Dennis Etchison	Richard DeRoy (Note: Based on a story by George Clayton Johnson; radio version incorrectly credits Rod Serling as teleplay writer)

=== Volume 8 (2006) ===
No. in overall	No. in season	Title	Starring	Adapted for radio by	Originally written by
71	1	"The Howling Man"	Fred Willard	Dennis Etchison	Charles Beaumont
72	2	"Caesar and Me"	Jason Alexander	Dennis Etchison	Adele T. Strassfield
73	3	"The Self-Improvement of Salvadore Ross"	Luke Perry	Dennis Etchison	Jerry McNeely (Note: Based on a short story by Henry Slesar)
74	4	"The Time Element" (Note: Originally aired as part of Westinghouse Desilu Playhouse)	Bobby Slayton	Dennis Etchison	Rod Serling
75	5	"The Mind and the Matter"	Hal Sparks	Dennis Etchison	Rod Serling
76	6	"People Are Alike All Over"	Blair Underwood	Dennis Etchison	Rod Serling (Note: Based on a short story by Paul W. Fairman)
77	7	"What You Need"	Bruno Kirby and Bruce Kirby	Dennis Etchison	Rod Serling (Note: Based on a short story by Lewis Padgett)
78	8	"Dead Man's Shoes"	Bill Smitrovich	Dennis Etchison	Charles Beaumont and Ocee Ritch (Note: Credited solely to Charles Beaumont)
79	9	"What's in the Box"	Mike Starr	Dennis Etchison	Martin Goldsmith
80	10	"Deaths-Head Revisited"	H. M. Wynant	Dennis Etchison	Rod Serling

=== Volume 9 (2006) ===
No. in overall	No. in season	Title	Starring	Adapted for radio by	Originally written by
81	1	"To Serve Man"	Blair Underwood	Dennis Etchison	Rod Serling (Note: Based on a short story by Damon Knight)
82	2	"A World of Difference"	Luke Perry	Dennis Etchison	Richard Matheson
83	3	"From Agnes—With Love"	Ed Begley Jr.	Dennis Etchison	Bernard C. Schoenfeld
84	4	"Perchance to Dream"	Fred Willard	Dennis Etchison	Charles Beaumont
85	5	"The Purple Testament"	Michael Rooker	Dennis Etchison	Rod Serling
86	6	"Printer's Devil"	Bobby Slayton	Dennis Etchison	Charles Beaumont
87	7	"Dust"	Bill Smitrovich	Dennis Etchison	Rod Serling
88	8	"The Jeopardy Room"	Stacy Keach	Dennis Etchison	Rod Serling
89	9	"The Fugitive"	Stan Freberg	Dennis Etchison	Charles Beaumont
90	10	"The Silence"	Christopher McDonald	Dennis Etchison	Rod Serling

=== Volume 10 (2007) ===
No. in overall	No. in season	Title	Starring	Adapted for radio by	Originally written by
91	1	"Miniature"	Lou Diamond Phillips	Dennis Etchison	Charles Beaumont
92	2	"The Jungle"	Ed Begley Jr.	Dennis Etchison	Charles Beaumont
93	3	"The Mighty Casey"	Paul Dooley	Dennis Etchison	Rod Serling
94	4	"Ring-a-Ding Girl"	Sarah Wayne Callies	Dennis Etchison	Earl Hamner Jr.
95	5	"Mute"	Wade Williams	Dennis Etchison	Richard Matheson
96	6	"Black Leather Jackets"	Marshall Allman	Dennis Etchison	Earl Hamner Jr.
97	7	"A Quality of Mercy"	Robert Knepper	Dennis Etchison	Rod Serling (Note: Based on an idea by Sam Rolfe)
98	8	"Where Is Everybody?"	John Schneider	Dennis Etchison	Rod Serling
99	9	"A Nice Place to Visit"	Hal Sparks	Dennis Etchison	Charles Beaumont
100	10	"In His Image"	John Heard	Dennis Etchison	Charles Beaumont

=== Volume 11 (2007) ===
No. in overall	No. in season	Title	Starring	Adapted for radio by	Originally written by
101	1	"Nightmare at 20,000 Feet"	John Schneider	Dennis Etchison	Richard Matheson
102	2	"Elegy"	Blair Underwood	Dennis Etchison	Charles Beaumont
103	3	"The Last Rites of Jeff Myrtlebank"	Robert Knepper	Dennis Etchison	Montgomery Pittman
104	4	"Spur of the Moment"	Sarah Wayne Callies	Dennis Etchison	Richard Matheson
105	5	"He's Alive"	Peter Mark Richman and Marshall Allman	Dennis Etchison	Rod Serling
106	6	"Long Distance Call"	Hal Sparks	Dennis Etchison	Charles Beaumont and William Idelson
107	7	"The Gift"	Danny Goldring	Dennis Etchison	Rod Serling
108	8	"Gentlemen, Be Seated" (Note: Written for The Twilight Zone but never produced)	Stan Freberg and Mike Starr	Dennis Etchison	Charles Beaumont
109	9	"You Drive"	John Heard	Dennis Etchison	Earl Hamner Jr.
110	10	"In Praise of Pip"	Fred Willard	Dennis Etchison	Rod Serling

=== Volume 12 ===
No. in overall	No. in season	Title	Starring	Adapted for radio by	Originally written by
111	1	"The Last Flight"	Charles Shaughnessy	Dennis Etchison	Richard Matheson
112	2	"Long Live Walter Jameson"	Lou Diamond Phillips	Dennis Etchison	Charles Beaumont
113	3	"Person or Persons Unknown"	John Schneider	Dennis Etchison	Charles Beaumont
114	4	"The Whole Truth"	Henry Rollins	Dennis Etchison	Rod Serling
115	5	"Stopover in a Quiet Town"	Stephnie Weir	Dennis Etchison	Earl Hamner Jr.
116	6	"Judgment Night"	Chelcie Ross	Dennis Etchison	Rod Serling
117	7	"The Chaser"	Stephen Tobolowsky	Dennis Etchison	Robert Presnell Jr. (Note: Based on a short story by John Collier)
118	8	"Shadow Play"	Ernie Hudson	Dennis Etchison	Charles Beaumont
119	9	"Nick of Time"	Marshall Allman and Jamie Brown	Dennis Etchison	Richard Matheson
120	10	"Static"	Stan Freberg	Dennis Etchison	Charles Beaumont (Note: Based on a story by Ocee Ritch)

=== Volume 13 ===
No. in overall	No. in season	Title	Starring	Adapted for radio by	Originally written by
121	1	"Death Ship"	John Schneider	Dennis Etchison	Richard Matheson
122	2	"Pattern for Doomsday" (Note: Written for The Twilight Zone but never produced)	Henry Rollins	Dennis Etchison	Jerry Sohl
123	3	"Nightmare as a Child"	Bonnie Somerville	Dennis Etchison	Rod Serling
124	4	"And When the Sky Was Opened"	Barry Bostwick	Dennis Etchison	Rod Serling (Note: Based on a short story by Richard Matheson)
125	5	"Little Girl Lost"	Stephen Tobolowsky	Dennis Etchison	Richard Matheson
126	6	"Jess-Belle"	Stephnie Weir	Dennis Etchison	Earl Hamner Jr.
127	7	"The Encounter"	Stacy Keach & Byron Mann	Dennis Etchison	Martin Goldsmith (Note: Radio version incorrectly credits Montgomery Pittman as writer for television version)
128	8	"A World of His Own"	Charles Shaughnessy	Dennis Etchison	Richard Matheson
129	9	"The New Exhibit"	JoBe Cerny	Dennis Etchison and JoBe Cerny	Jerry Sohl and Charles Beaumont (Note: Credited solely to Charles Beaumont)
130	10	"Valley of the Shadow"	Chelcie Ross	Dennis Etchison	Charles Beaumont

=== Volume 14 ===
This collection was only released as an online digital download, rather than on CD.

No. in overall	No. in season	Title	Starring	Adapted for radio by	Originally written by
131	1	"Night Call"	Mariette Hartley	Dennis Etchison	Richard Matheson
132	2	"Kick the Can"	Shelley Berman & Stan Freberg	Dennis Etchison	George Clayton Johnson
133	3	"A Game of Pool"	Wade Williams	Dennis Etchison and JoBe Cerny	George Clayton Johnson
134	4	"A Penny For Your Thoughts"	David Eigenberg	Dennis Etchison	George Clayton Johnson
135	5	"Free Dirt" (Note: Written for The Twilight Zone but never produced)	Eric Bogosian	Dennis Etchison	Charles Beaumont
136	6	"Number 12 Looks Just Like You"	Bonnie Somerville & Charles Shaughnessy	Dennis Etchison	Charles Beaumont and John Tomerlin
137	7	"On Thursday We Leave for Home"	Barry Bostwick	Dennis Etchison	Rod Serling
138	8	"Third from the Sun"	Fred Willard	Dennis Etchison	Rod Serling (Note: Based on a short story by Richard Matheson)
139	9	"The Trouble with Templeton"	Michael York	Dennis Etchison	E. Jack Neuman
140	10	"The Mirror"	Tony Plana	Dennis Etchison	Rod Serling

=== Volume 15 ===
This collection was only released as an online digital download, rather than on CD.

No. in overall	No. in season	Title	Starring	Adapted for radio by	Originally written by
141	1	"The Prime Mover"	David Eigenberg	Dennis Etchison	Charles Beaumont (Note: Based on a story by George Clayton Johnson)
142	2	"A Piano in the House"	Michael York	Dennis Etchison	Earl Hamner Jr.
143	3	"The Four of Us Are Dying"	Eric Bogosian	Dennis Etchison	Rod Serling
144	4	"The Sixteen-Millimeter Shrine"	Kathy Garver	Dennis Etchison	Rod Serling
145	5	"The Shelter"	Ernie Hudson	Dennis Etchison	Rod Serling
146	6	"Young Man's Fancy"	Tony Plana	Dennis Etchison	Richard Matheson (Note: Radio version incorrectly credits Rod Serling as teleplay writer)
147	7	"Probe 7, Over and Out"	Louis Gossett Jr.	Dennis Etchison	Rod Serling
148	8	"Two"	Don Johnson	Dennis Etchison	Montgomery Pittman
149	9	"Who Am I?" (Note: Written for The Twilight Zone but never produced)	Sean Astin	Dennis Etchison	Jerry Sohl
150	10	"The Bewitchin' Pool"	Karen Black	Dennis Etchison	Earl Hamner Jr.

=== Volume 16 ===
This collection was only released as an online digital download, rather than on CD.

No. in overall	No. in season	Title	Starring	Adapted for radio by	Originally written by
151	1	"The Hunt"	Shelley Berman & Karen Black	Dennis Etchison	Earl Hamner Jr.
152	2	"Passage on the Lady Anne"	Martin Jarvis & Rosalind Ayres	Dennis Etchison	Charles Beaumont
153	3	"Execution"	Don Johnson	Dennis Etchison	Rod Serling (Note: Based on a story by George Clayton Johnson)
154	4	"Steel"	Louis Gossett Jr.	Dennis Etchison and JoBe Cerny	Richard Matheson
155	5	"The Amazing Dr. Kyle Powers"	Sean Astin	Barry Rickard	
156	6	"Nothing in the Dark"	Marshall Allman	M.J. Elliott	George Clayton Johnson
157	7	"There Goes the Neighborhood"	Tim Kazurinsky	Barry Rickard	
158	8	"The Walk-Abouts"	Mike Starr	Steve Newby	
159	9	"An Occurrence At Owl Creek Bridge" (Note: Originally produced in France)	Christian Stolte	M.J. Elliott	Robert Enrico (Note: Adapted from a story by Ambrose Bierce)
160	10	"Now You Hear It, Now You Don't"	Dee Wallace	Dennis Etchison (Note: Based on a story by Carl Amari)	

=== Volume 17 ===
This collection was only released as an online digital download, rather than on CD.

No. in overall	No. in season	Title	Starring	Adapted for radio by	Originally written by
161	1	"Once Upon a Time"	John Rhys-Davies	M.J. Elliott	Richard Matheson
162	2	"The Invaders"	Kathy Garver	Barry Rickard	Richard Matheson
163	3	"Beewinjapeedee"	Sean Astin	JoBe Cerny	
164	4	"Eye of the Beholder"	Virginia Williams	Barry Rickard	Rod Serling
165	5	"I Sing the Body Electric"	Dee Wallace	Dennis Etchison	Ray Bradbury
166	6	"Mrs. Pierce is Praying for Me"	Tim Kazurinsky	Dennis Etchison (Note: Based on a story by Robert Patterson)	
167	7	"The Time of Your Life"	John Rhys-Davies	Matthew Elliott	
168	8	"Ten Days"	Ned Bellamy	Mark Valente	
169	9	"Snow Angel"	Sean Astin	JoBe Cerny	
170	10	"The Nanobots"	David Pasquesi	Steve Newby	

=== Volume 18 ===
This collection was only released as an online digital download, rather than on CD.

Title	Starring	Written by
"Two Thousand-Twelve"	Christian Stolte	Steve Newby
"...And Cauldron Bubble"	Virginia Williams	Christine Watson
"Missing, Presumed Dead"	Danny Goldring	Dennis Etchison
"Rest Stop"	Brandon Eels	Steve Newby
"The 25th Hour"	Mike Nussbaum	Dennis Etchison
"Another Place in Time"	Malcolm McDowell	Steve Newby

== Releases ==
=== CD and digital ===
The Twilight Zone Radio Dramas were initially produced in 2002 and made available for sale on-line with the launch of the Twilight Zone Radio website. They were originally available in audio cassette tape and CD "collections" of 4 episodes apiece. Eight episodes were produced in 2002, and eight more in 2003. By late 2004, after the first 24 episodes were released between 6 numbered collections, the series would no longer be made available on cassette and new CD "volumes" comprising 10 episodes each were introduced with the release of six additional episodes, ending the year with 14 episodes for 30 in total, which were reorganized and shuffled between these first 3 volumes.

In 2006, volumes 4 through 9 were released (60 episodes), then volumes 10 through 12 appeared in 2007 (30 episodes), and volume 13 in 2008 (10 episodes) would be the last volume made available on CD. Beginning in 2007, the shows were made available for individual MP3 download at $1.95 each, with most of volumes 14 through 17 released in 2009 and 2010 (38 episodes), and the last 8 episodes were produced between 2011 and 2012; leaving volume 18 incomplete with only 6 episodes. The final episode is titled "Another Place in Time" with no plans for further production.

By mid-2015, the website moved to hollywood360radio.net and in 2016 the website went completely offline, and with the domain redirecting to www.classicradiostore.com.

CDs and digital downloads of the shows can be purchased on Amazon and Audible from a variety of sources, with no real consistency in show or volume or collection composition and several differing from the CD version. These two excerpts from "A Hundred Yards Over the Rim" (volume 3 episode 3) are an example.

"A Hundred Yards Over the Rim" CD version

"A Hundred Yards Over the Rim" download version

=== DVD and Blu-ray ===
Some episodes of the radio drama were included on the DVD and Blu-ray releases of the TV series as special features alongside the original episodes. Although 155 out of 156 episodes of the TV series were remade as radio dramas (the exception being "Come Wander with Me"), only 30 are included on the DVD releases and 81 on the Blu-rays.

The radio episodes included on the Blu-rays are listed below in TV series order.

==== Season 1 ====
- "Where Is Everybody?"
- "One for the Angels" (also on DVD)
- "Walking Distance"
- "Escape Clause"
- "The Lonely" (also on DVD)
- "Time Enough at Last"
- "Perchance to Dream"
- "I Shot an Arrow into the Air" (also on DVD)
- "The Hitch-Hiker"
- "The Fever"
- "The Last Flight"
- "Mirror Image"
- "The Monsters Are Due on Maple Street" (also on DVD)
- "Long Live Walter Jameson"
- "People Are Alike All Over"
- "The Big Tall Wish" (also on DVD)
- "The After Hours" (also on DVD)
- "The Mighty Casey"

==== Season 2 ====
- "The Man in the Bottle"
- "Nervous Man in a Four Dollar Room" (also on DVD)
- "The Howling Man"
- "Nick of Time"
- "The Lateness of the Hour" (also on DVD)
- "The Trouble with Templeton"
- "The Night of the Meek"
- "Back There"
- "The Whole Truth"
- "The Odyssey of Flight 33" (also on DVD)
- "Static"
- "A Hundred Yards Over the Rim" (also on DVD)
- "The Silence"
- "Will the Real Martian Please Stand Up?" (also on DVD)
- "The Obsolete Man" (also on DVD)

==== Season 3 ====
- "Two"
- "The Arrival"
- "The Shelter"
- "The Passersby" (also on DVD)
- "The Mirror"
- "The Grave"
- "Deaths-Head Revisited" (also on DVD)
- "Still Valley" (also on DVD)
- "The Jungle"
- "Five Characters in Search of an Exit"
- "One More Pallbearer" (also on DVD)
- "Dead Man's Shoes"
- "Kick the Can"
- "A Piano in the House"
- "To Serve Man"
- "Four O'Clock" (also on DVD)
- "The Trade-Ins"
- "The Dummy" (also on DVD)
- "The Changing of the Guard"

==== Season 4 ====
- "The Thirty-Fathom Grave" (also on DVD)
- "No Time Like the Past" (also on DVD)
- "The Parallel" (also on DVD)
- "Of Late I Think of Cliffordville" (also on DVD)
- "The Incredible World of Horace Ford" (also on DVD)
- "On Thursday We Leave for Home"
- "The Bard" (also on DVD)

==== Season 5 ====
- "Steel"
- "A Kind of a Stopwatch" (also on DVD)
- "Living Doll" (also on DVD)
- "The Old Man in the Cave"
- "Uncle Simon"
- "Probe 7, Over and Out"
- "The 7th Is Made Up of Phantoms" (also on DVD)
- "A Short Drink from a Certain Fountain"
- "Ninety Years Without Slumbering"
- "The Long Morrow" (also on DVD)
- "The Self-Improvement of Salvadore Ross"
- "Night Call"
- "From Agnes—With Love"
- "Queen of the Nile"
- "What's in the Box"
- "The Masks"
- "Sounds and Silences" (also on DVD)
- "Caesar and Me"
- "Mr. Garrity and the Graves" (also on DVD)
- "The Brain Center at Whipple's"
- "The Fear"
- "The Bewitchin' Pool"
