= Night Ride and Other Journeys =

Anthology of short stories by Charles Beaumont

First edition (publ. Bantam Books)

Night Ride and Other Journeys is the third anthology of short stories by Charles Beaumont, published in March 1960. The volume is out of print, but reasonably available.

== Stories collected ==
Title	Originally published in
"The Music of the Yellow Brass"	January 1959 issue of Playboy
"A Classic Affair"	December 1955 issue of Playboy
"The New People"	August 1958 issue of Rogue
"Buck Fever"	Previously unpublished
"The Magic Man"	Previously unpublished
"Oh, Father Mine" / "Father, Dear Father"	January 1957 issue of Venture
"Perchance to Dream" (adapted for Twilight Zone)	October 1958 issue of Playboy
"Song for a Lady" (adapted for Twilight Zone)	Previously unpublished
"The Trigger"	January 1959 issue of Mystery Digest
"The Guests of Chance" (with Chad Oliver)	June 1956 issue of Infinity Science Fiction
"The Love-Master"	February 1957 issue of Rogue
"A Death in the Country" / "The Deadly Will To Win"	November 1957 issue of Playboy
"The Neighbors"	Previously unpublished
"The Howling Man" (adapted for Twilight Zone)	November 1959 issue of Rogue
"Night Ride"	March 1957 issue of Playboy
