= Yonder (collection) =

Book by Charles Beaumont

- First edition cover
- Author: Charles Beaumont
- Language: English
- Genre: Fantasy
- Published: 1958 (Bantam Books)
- Publication place: United States
- Media type: Print (paperback)
- Pages: 184 pages
- OCLC: 4272960

Yonder is the second anthology of short stories by American writer Charles Beaumont, published in April 1958.

== Stories collected ==
Title	Originally published in
"You Can't Have Them All"	August 1956 issue of Playboy
"Fritzchen"	1953 (#1) issue of Orbit
"Last Rites"	October 1955 issue of If
"Place of Meeting"	1953 (#2) issue of Orbit
"A World of Differents"	Previously unpublished
"Anthem"	Previously unpublished
"In His Image" / "The Man Who Made Himself"	February 1957 issue of Imagination
"The Jungle"	December 1954 issue of If
"The Quadriopticon"	August 1954 issue of F&SF
"Hair of the Dog"	July 1954 (Orbit #3) issue of Orbit
"The Beautiful People"	September 1952 issue of If
"The Last Caper"	March 1954 issue of F&SF
"Mother's Day"	Previously unpublished
"Traumerei"	February 1956 issue of Infinity Science Fiction
"The Monster Show"	May 1956 issue of Playboy
"The New Sound"	June 1955 issue of F&SF

== Reception ==
Anthony Boucher found the stories in Yonder to have been better chosen than those in Beaumont's first collection, The Hunger and Other Stories; he praised the book as "grotesque, sensitive, funny, horrible -- in short, Beaumontesque, and strongly recommended."
