= The Twilight Zone season 4 =

The Twilight Zone
- Season 4
- No. of episodes: 18

Release
- Original network: CBS
- Original release: January 3 – May 23, 1963

Season chronology
- ← Previous; Season 3 Next → Season 5

The fourth season of The Twilight Zone aired Thursdays at 9:00–10:00 pm on CBS from January 3 to May 23, 1963.

This season broke with the previous seasons in presenting hour-long episodes instead of the earlier half-hour episodes. The opening sequence was revamped, and introduces the now-iconic floating door, smashed window, clock, eyeball, wooden doll, and the equation for Einstein's theory of relativity. Rod Serling's introduction was also changed from the earlier seasons:

"You unlock this door with the key of imagination. Beyond it is another dimension. A dimension of sound. A dimension of sight. A dimension of mind. You're moving into a land of both shadow and substance, of things and ideas. You've just crossed over into the Twilight Zone."

An intermission graphic based on this opening was used for the fourth and fifth seasons as well.

== Episodes ==
No. overall	No. in season	Title	Directed by	Written by	Music by	Original release date	Prod. code
103	1	"In His Image"	Perry Lafferty	Charles Beaumont	N/A	January 3, 1963	4851
104	2	"The Thirty Fathom Grave"	Perry Lafferty	Rod Serling	N/A	January 10, 1963	4857
105	3	"Valley of the Shadow"	Perry Lafferty	Charles Beaumont	N/A	January 17, 1963	4861
106	4	"He's Alive"	Stuart Rosenberg	Rod Serling	N/A	January 24, 1963	4856
107	5	"Mute"	Stuart Rosenberg	Richard Matheson	Fred Steiner	January 31, 1963	4858
108	6	"Death Ship"	Don Medford	Richard Matheson	N/A	February 7, 1963	4850
109	7	"Jess-Belle"	Buzz Kulik	Earl Hamner, Jr.	Van Cleave	February 14, 1963	4855
110	8	"Miniature"	Walter Grauman	Charles Beaumont	Fred Steiner	February 21, 1963	4862
111	9	"Printer's Devil"	Ralph Senensky	Charles Beaumont	N/A	February 28, 1963	4864
112	10	"No Time Like the Past"	Justus Addiss	Rod Serling	N/A	March 7, 1963	4853
113	11	"The Parallel"	Alan Crosland, Jr.	Rod Serling	N/A	March 14, 1963	4859
114	12	"I Dream of Genie"	Robert Gist	John Furia, Jr.	Fred Steiner	March 21, 1963	4860
115	13	"The New Exhibit"	John Brahm	Jerry Sohl (credited to Charles Beaumont)	N/A	April 4, 1963	4866
116	14	"Of Late I Think of Cliffordville"	David Lowell Rich	Based on the short story "Blind Alley" by : Malcolm Jameson; Teleplay by : Rod Serling	N/A	April 11, 1963	4867
117	15	"The Incredible World of Horace Ford"	Abner Biberman	Reginald Rose	N/A	April 18, 1963	4854
118	16	"On Thursday We Leave for Home"	Buzz Kulik	Rod Serling	N/A	May 2, 1963	4868
119	17	"Passage on the Lady Anne"	Lamont Johnson	Charles Beaumont	Rene Garriguenc	May 9, 1963	4869
120	18	"The Bard"	David Butler	Rod Serling	Fred Steiner	May 23, 1963	4852
