= Passage on the Lady Anne =

- The Twilight Zone episode
- Episode no.: Season 4 Episode 17
- Directed by: Lamont Johnson
- Written by: Charles Beaumont
- Based on: "Song for a Lady" by Charles Beaumont
- Production code: 4869
- Original air date: May 9, 1963

Guest appearances
- Lee Philips; Joyce Van Patten; Wilfrid Hyde-White; Gladys Cooper; Cecil Kellaway; Alan Napier; Cyril Delevanti; Don Keefer; Jack Raine

Episode chronology
← Previous "On Thursday We Leave for Home"	Next → "The Bard"
- The Twilight Zone (1959 TV series) (season 4)

"Passage on the Lady Anne" is an episode of the American television anthology series The Twilight Zone. In this episode, a couple whose marriage is struggling travel aboard an aging ocean liner, unaware that the ship is on a final voyage into the afterlife. The cast features Lee Philips, Joyce Van Patten, Wilfrid Hyde-White, Gladys Cooper, Cecil Kellaway and Alan Napier and the script was written by Charles Beaumont.

== Opening narration ==
Portrait of a honeymoon couple getting ready for a journey – with a difference. These newlyweds have been married for six years, and they're not taking this honeymoon to start their life but rather to save it, or so Eileen Ransome thinks. She doesn't know why she insisted on a ship for this voyage, except that it would give them some time and she'd never been on one before – certainly never one like the Lady Anne. The tickets read "New York to Southampton", but this old liner is going somewhere else. Its destination – the Twilight Zone.

== Plot ==
When successful financier Alan Ransome makes plans for a business trip to London, his wife Eileen insists on coming with him and taking the slowest passenger ship available, the Lady Anne. Eileen hopes the estimated 13-day voyage from New York City will allow them to rekindle their marriage. When they board, two male passengers express dismay at their presence, stating that the voyage is a private cruise, and offer the Ransomes the equivalent of 10,000 US dollars if they get off. The Ransomes refuse, and chalk up the offer to anti-American snobbery.

During the trip Alan is taciturn and grouchy about the lengthy voyage, while Eileen maintains a forced playfulness in an effort to spark their old feelings. Both their tempers are worsened by the discovery that the entire crew and all the other passengers are elderly. A quarrel culminates with the Ransomes agreeing to separate when they reach London.

The next day they accept an invitation to tea from Millie and Toby McKenzie, who apologize for their earlier hostility. They explain that the 50-year-old Lady Anne is a ship for honeymooners, and is being retired following the voyage. Most of those on board are repeat passengers enjoying a farewell cruise. They had not expected newcomers since the Lady Anne has had no new passengers in 15 years. The passengers all speak of the Lady Anne as if it were a sentient being, and credit "her" with enhancing their love for their spouses. Eileen is saddened to learn that one of the passengers is newly widowed, and in attempted reassurance the passenger informs her that he and his wife "will be together again soon".

While the Ransomes are out on deck, Eileen disappears. Alan searches the ship with no success, but the other passengers and crew remain nonchalant about the matter. Toby tells Alan that Eileen isn't really gone, but only seems that way because Alan has "been missing her". When Alan retires to his room, Eileen is there wearing the nightgown that Millie wore on her honeymoon. She says she has been in the room the whole time, even though Alan had already searched there. Overcome with passion, Alan begins kissing her and symbolically throws his pocket watch overboard through their room's porthole, later explaining that he had become so focused on rushing all the time that he lost sight of what was most important.

The Ransomes find their love rekindled, and agree with the other passengers that the Lady Anne has a magic that strengthens love. They are in the ship's ballroom when the engines stop. The captain enters and forces the Ransomes off the ship at gunpoint, telling them there isn't time for lengthy explanations. The Ransomes are put into a lifeboat stocked with provisions and set adrift in mid-ocean. Toby assures them that their position has been radioed to the local coast guard. The Ransomes are picked up by a cutter after a few hours, but they can find no report of the Lady Anne docking in England or anywhere else.

== Closing narration ==
The Lady Anne never reached port. After they were picked up by a cutter a few hours later, as Captain Protheroe had promised, the Ransomes searched the newspapers for news – but there wasn't any news. The Lady Anne with all her crew and all her passengers vanished without a trace. But the Ransomes knew what had happened, they knew that the ship had sailed off to a better port – a place called the Twilight Zone.

== Production notes ==
This was the last episode actually written by Charles Beaumont. Although there would be other episodes credited to Beaumont later, according to The Twilight Zone Companion, these episodes were ghostwritten by either Jerry Sohl or John Tomerlin, as Beaumont was seriously ill.

== Cast ==
- Lee Philips as Alan Ransome
- Joyce Van Patten as Eileen Ransome
- Wilfrid Hyde-White as Tobias "Toby" McKenzie
- Gladys Cooper as Mrs. Millicent "Millie" McKenzie
- Cecil Kellaway as Ian Burgess
- Alan Napier as Captain Prothero
- Cyril Delevanti as Officer
- Don Keefer as Spiereto
- Jack Raine as Officer
