= Friedrich von Ledebur =

Austrian actor (1900–1986)

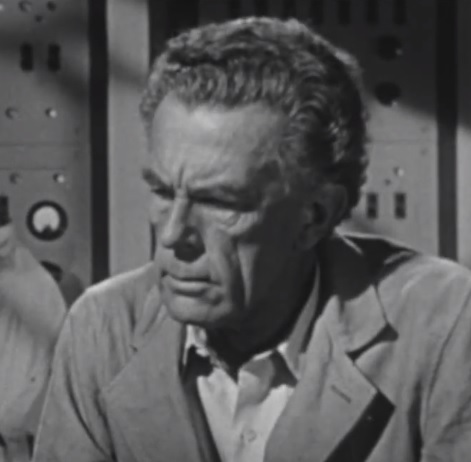
- von Ledebur in The 27th Day (1957)
- Born: Friedrich Anton Maria Hubertus Bonifacius Graf von Ledebur-Wicheln; 3 June 1900; Nisko, Austro-Hungarian Empire
- Died: 25 December 1986 (aged 86); Linz, Austria
- Years active: 1945–1982
- Known for: Actor in Moby Dick, Alexander the Great (1955) and Slaughterhouse-Five (1972)
- Height: 6 ft 7 in (201 cm)
- Spouses: Iris Tree (m. 1934, divorced) Gräfin Alice Hoyos von Stichsenstein (m. 1955)
- Children: 2

Friedrich Anton Maria Hubertus Bonifacius Graf (Count) von Ledebur-Wicheln (3 June 1900 – 25 December 1986) was an Austrian actor who was known for Moby Dick (1956), Alexander the Great (1955) and Slaughterhouse-Five (1972).

== Early life ==
Ledebur was born in Nisko, Austro-Hungarian Empire (now Poland) in 1900. During the First World War, he enlisted in the Austro-Hungarian Army and was an officer in the Austrian Cavalry Division.

== Interwar period ==
In the 1930s Ledebur became a close friend of Charles Bedaux, with whom he traveled extensively in Africa and Canada. After the war, Ledebur spent the next two decades travelling the world, working all manner of odd jobs from gold mining to deep sea diving, to riding and winning prize money at rodeos. Ledebur settled in the United States in 1939 and anglicised his name to 'Frederick'. A close friendship with fellow adventurer and director John Huston, gave Ledebur his entrée to character acting.

== Acting career ==
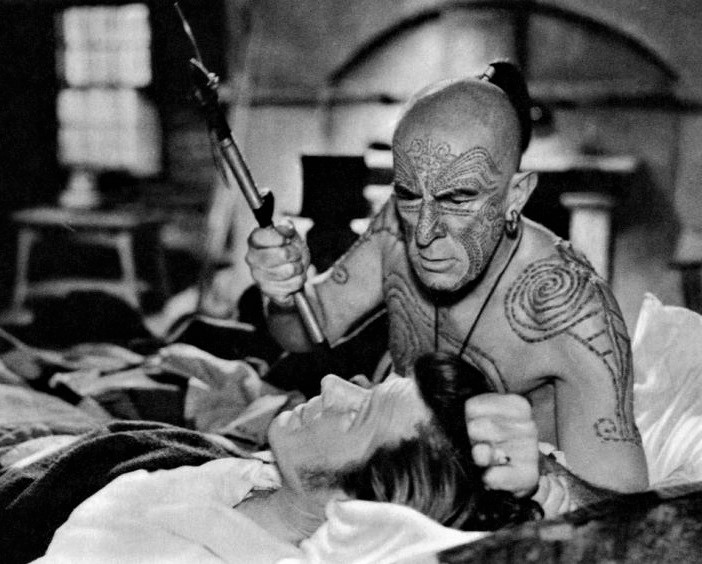
Friedrich von Ledebur as Queequeg in Moby Dick

In 1945, Ledebur made his film debut. He later appeared in Alexander the Great (1955), and played chief harpooneer Queequeg, a South Sea chieftain, in the film Moby Dick (1956). He appeared as Brother Christophorus in The Twilight Zone episode "The Howling Man".

== Death ==
Ledebur died on December 25, 1986, in Linz, Austria, aged 86.

== Selected filmography ==
- A Royal Scandal (1945) - Russian General (uncredited)
- Notorious (1946) - Knerr (uncredited)
- Forever Amber (1947) - Cavalier (uncredited)
- My Girl Tisa (1948) - Igor (uncredited)
- Mr. Blandings Builds His Dream House (1948) - Workman (uncredited)
- The Great Sinner (1949) - Casino Secretary
- Moulin Rouge (1952) - Maitre d'Hotel at Maxim's (uncredited)
- Alexander the Great (1956) - Antipater
- Moby Dick (1956) - Queequeg
- Voodoo Island (1957) - Native Chief
- The Man Who Turned to Stone (1957) - Eric
- The 27th Day (1957) - Dr. Karl Neuhaus
- The Brothers Karamazov (1958) - Chief Judge (uncredited)
- Crash Landing (1958) - Priest (uncredited)
- Fräulein (1958) - German Police Captain (uncredited)
- The Roots of Heaven (1958) - Peer Qvist
- Enchanted Island (1958) - Mehevi
- The Buccaneer (1958) - Capt. Bart
- A Breath of Scandal (1960) - Count Sandor
- Barabbas (1961) - Officer
- Freud: The Secret Passion (1962) - (uncredited)
- The Fall of the Roman Empire (1964) - Barbarian (uncredited)
- The Shoot (1964) - Mübarek
- The Treasure of the Aztecs (1965) - Count Don Fernando di Rodriganda y Sevilla
- Juliet of the Spirits (1965) - Medium
- The Blue Max (1966) - Feldmarschall von Lenndorf
- Il Natale che quasi non fu (1967) - (uncredited)
- Reflections in a Golden Eye (1967) - Lieutenant at Garden Party (uncredited)
- Assignment K (1968) - Ski Shop Proprietor (uncredited)
- Oedipus the King (1968) - King Laius
- Mayerling (1968) - Hofmarschall (uncredited)
- The Last Roman (1968/69) - Hildebrand
- The Christmas Tree (1969) - Vernet
- Slaughterhouse-Five (1972) - German Leader
- Ludwig (1973) - Hofmarschall (uncredited)
- A Genius, Two Partners and a Dupe (1975) - Don Felipe, the priest
- Potato Fritz (1976) - Martin Ross
- The Standard (1977) - General
- Sorcerer (1977) - 'Carlos'
- Bloodline (1979) - Innkeeper
- Ginger and Fred (1986) - Admiral Aulenti (final film role)
