= Lee Philips =

American actor

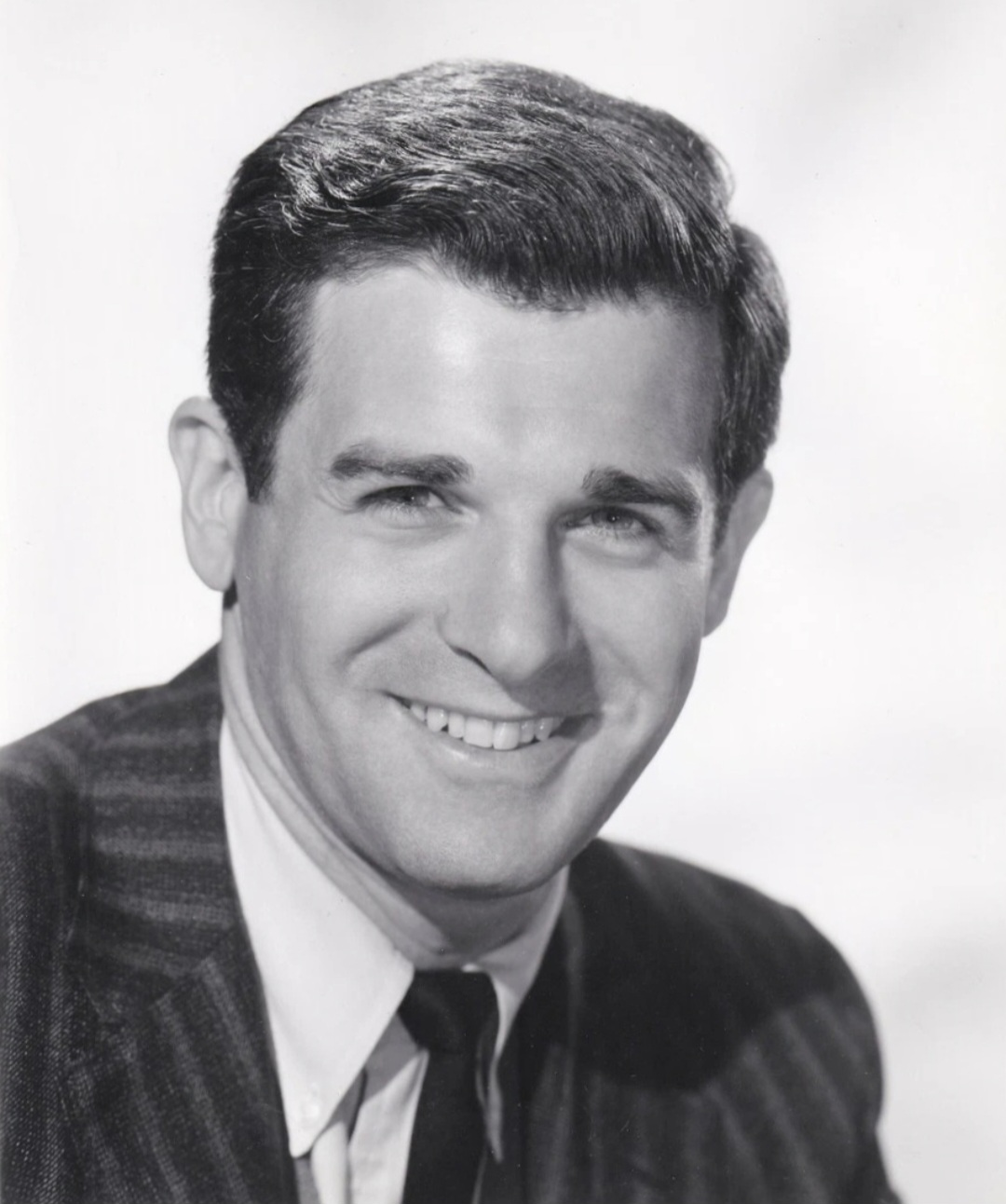
- Philips in 1955
- Born: Leon Friedman; January 10, 1927; New York City, U.S.
- Died: March 3, 1999 (aged 72)
- Occupation: Actor/Director

Lee Philips (born Leon Friedman; January 10, 1927 – March 3, 1999) was an American actor, film director, and television director.

== Life and career ==
Philips was born in New York. His acting career started on Broadway, and peaked with a starring role as Michael Rossi in the film adaptation of Peyton Place opposite Lana Turner. He appeared in the Paddy Chayefsky motion picture, Middle of the Night (1959) as Kim Novak's character's ex-husband, George. The following year, Philips was cast as the compassionate Lieutenant Wood in the episode, "The White Healer", on the syndicated television anthology series, Death Valley Days, hosted by Stanley Andrews.

Later in the 1960s, his career shifted towards directing, with credits ranging from the television series of Peyton Place to The Dick Van Dyke Show. He still did occasional acting, such as his appearance in 1963 in "Never Wave Goodbye", a two-part episode of The Fugitive. He also guest starred on The Outer Limits in the premiere episode, "The Galaxy Being". Also in 1963, he played a lead role in "Passage on the Lady Anne", an hour-long episode of The Twilight Zone; he returned to the show the following year in the episode "Queen of the Nile", where he played a reporter named Jordan "Jordy" Herrick. He was Juror Number 5 in the Studio One version of Twelve Angry Men. He appeared in Flipper in 1964. He did a guest appearance on Season 4 Episode 7 of TV's Route 66.

Philips made two guest appearances on Perry Mason in (1965): as Kevin Lawrence in "The Case of the Golden Venom", and as Gordon Evans in "The Case of the Fatal Fortune". He played Harlan Fortune in S8 E26 "The Jarbo Pierce Story" on Wagon Train, 1965. He also guest starred on the Combat!: episode: "A Walk with an Eagle". In 1973 he directed The Girl Most Likely to... starring Stockard Channing. He directed Dick Van Dyke on several episodes of Diagnosis: Murder. He died in 1999 at the age of 72 from progressive supranuclear palsy.

== Filmography ==
Year	Title	Role	Notes
1954	Studio One	Juror No. 5	"Twelve Angry Men"
1956	Alfred Hitchcock Presents	Georgie Minnelli	Season 2 Episode 7: "Alibi Me"
1957	Alfred Hitchcock Presents	Jack Staley	Season 3 Episode 11: "The Deadly"
1957	Peyton Place	Michael Rossi	
1958	The Hunters	First Lieutenant Carl Abbott	
1959	The Further Adventures of Ellery Queen	Ellery Queen	13 episodes
1959	Middle of the Night	George Preisser	
1960	Tess of the Storm Country	Eric Thorson	
1961	Alfred Hitchcock Presents	Ben Conan / Fred Sheldon	Season 6 Episode 27: "Deathmate"
1962	The Alfred Hitchcock Hour	Frank Carlin	Season 1 Episode 9: "The Black Curtain"
1963	The Twilight Zone	Alan Ransome	Season 4 Episode 17: "Passage on the Lady Anne"
1963	The Twilight Zone	Jordan Herrick	Season 5 Episode 23: "Queen of the Nile"
1963	Violent Midnight	Elliot Freeman	
1965	The Lollipop Cover	Nestor	
