= The Twilight Zone season 1 =

The Twilight Zone
- Season 1
- No. of episodes: 36

Release
- Original network: CBS
- Original release: October 2, 1959 – July 1, 1960

Season chronology
- Next → Season 2

The first season of The Twilight Zone aired Fridays at 10:00–10:30 pm (EST) on CBS from October 2, 1959, to July 1, 1960. There are 36 episodes, including the pilot, "Where Is Everybody?" The theme music for this season, written by Bernard Herrmann, is different from the music most commonly associated with the series, written by Marius Constant for the second season onwards.

== Intro ==
The opening intro for most of these episodes features a series of lagoon graphics by UPA, with Rod Serling's narration:

"There is a fifth dimension, beyond that which is known to man. It is a dimension as vast as space and as timeless as infinity. It is the middle ground between light and shadow, between science and superstition, and it lies between the pit of man's fears and the summit of his knowledge. This is the dimension of imagination. It is an area which we call The Twilight Zone."

A different intro was used for the final four episodes, featuring an animated close-up of an eye that metamorphosed into a setting sun and an abridged version of Herrmann's theme music. Serling's narration for this went as follows:

"You are about to enter another dimension. A dimension not only of sight and sound but of mind. A journey into a wondrous land of imagination. Next stop—The Twilight Zone."

The graphics for this opening were by Pacific Title, as were those for the openings in the subsequent seasons.

At least one episode, "Mr. Denton on Doomsday", is known to have had this opening dubbed over the original lagoon opening when it was aired as a summer repeat in 1960. The following summer, a number of first-season episodes had the second season intro dubbed over the original when they were aired as repeats. The original openings have since been restored for those episodes.

Segments of the original first season intro continued to be used as an intermission graphic up through season three.

== Episodes ==
No. overall	No. in season	Title	Directed by	Written by	Music by	Original release date	Prod. code
1	1	"Where Is Everybody?"	Robert Stevens	Rod Serling	Bernard Herrmann	October 2, 1959	173-3601
2	2	"One for the Angels"	Robert Parrish	Rod Serling	N/A	October 9, 1959	173-3608
3	3	"Mr. Denton on Doomsday"	Allen Reisner	Rod Serling	N/A	October 16, 1959	173-3609
4	4	"The Sixteen-Millimeter Shrine"	Mitchell Leisen	Rod Serling	Franz Waxman	October 23, 1959	173-3610
5	5	"Walking Distance"	Robert Stevens	Rod Serling	Bernard Herrmann	October 30, 1959	173-3605
6	6	"Escape Clause"	Mitchell Leisen	Rod Serling	N/A	November 6, 1959	173-3603
7	7	"The Lonely"	Jack Smight	Rod Serling	Bernard Herrmann	November 13, 1959	173-3602
8	8	"Time Enough at Last"	John Brahm	Based on a short story by : Lynn Venable; Teleplay by : Rod Serling	Leith Stevens	November 20, 1959	173-3614
9	9	"Perchance to Dream"	Robert Florey	Charles Beaumont	Van Cleave	November 27, 1959	173-3616
10	10	"Judgment Night"	John Brahm	Rod Serling	N/A	December 4, 1959	173-3604
11	11	"And When the Sky Was Opened"	Douglas Heyes	Based on a short story by : Richard Matheson; Teleplay by : Rod Serling	Leonard Rosenman	December 11, 1959	173-3611
12	12	"What You Need"	Alvin Ganzer	Based on a short story by : Lewis Padgett; Teleplay by : Rod Serling	Van Cleave	December 25, 1959	173-3622
13	13	"The Four of Us Are Dying"	John Brahm	Based on a short story by : George Clayton Johnson; Teleplay by : Rod Serling	Jerry Goldsmith	January 1, 1960	173-3618
14	14	"Third from the Sun"	Richard L. Bare	Based on a short story by : Richard Matheson; Teleplay by : Rod Serling	N/A	January 8, 1960	173-3615
15	15	"I Shot an Arrow into the Air"	Stuart Rosenberg	Based on a story by : Madelon Champion; Teleplay by : Rod Serling	N/A	January 15, 1960	173-3626
16	16	"The Hitch-Hiker"	Alvin Ganzer	Based on the radio play by : Lucille Fletcher; Teleplay by : Rod Serling	N/A	January 22, 1960	173-3612
17	17	"The Fever"	Robert Florey	Rod Serling	N/A	January 29, 1960	173-3627
18	18	"The Last Flight"	William F. Claxton	Richard Matheson	N/A	February 5, 1960	173-3607
19	19	"The Purple Testament"	Richard L. Bare	Rod Serling	Lucien Moraweck	February 12, 1960	173-3619
20	20	"Elegy"	Douglas Heyes	Charles Beaumont	Van Cleave	February 19, 1960	173-3625
21	21	"Mirror Image"	John Brahm	Rod Serling	N/A	February 26, 1960	173-3623
22	22	"The Monsters Are Due on Maple Street"	Ronald Winston	Rod Serling	Rene Garriguenc	March 4, 1960	173-3620
23	23	"A World of Difference"	Ted Post	Richard Matheson	Van Cleave	March 11, 1960	173-3624
24	24	"Long Live Walter Jameson"	Anton Leader	Charles Beaumont	N/A	March 18, 1960	173-3621
25	25	"People Are Alike All Over"	Mitchell Leisen	Based on a short story by : Paul W. Fairman; Teleplay by : Rod Serling	N/A	March 25, 1960	173-3613
26	26	"Execution"	David Orrick McDearmon	Based on a short story by : George Clayton Johnson; Teleplay by : Rod Serling	N/A	April 1, 1960	173-3628
27	27	"The Big Tall Wish"	Ronald Winston	Rod Serling	Jerry Goldsmith	April 8, 1960	173-3630
28	28	"A Nice Place to Visit"	John Brahm	Charles Beaumont	N/A	April 15, 1960	173-3632
29	29	"Nightmare as a Child"	Alvin Ganzer	Rod Serling	Jerry Goldsmith	April 29, 1960	173-3635
30	30	"A Stop at Willoughby"	Robert Parrish	Rod Serling	Nathan Scott	May 6, 1960	173-3629
31	31	"The Chaser"	Douglas Heyes	Based on a short story by : John Collier; Teleplay by : Robert Presnell, Jr.	N/A	May 13, 1960	173-3636
32	32	"A Passage for Trumpet"	Don Medford	Rod Serling	Lyn Murray	May 20, 1960	173-3633
33	33	"Mr. Bevis"	William Asher	Rod Serling	N/A	June 3, 1960	173-3631
34	34	"The After Hours"	Douglas Heyes	Rod Serling	N/A	June 10, 1960	173-3637
35	35	"The Mighty Casey"	Alvin Ganzer; Robert Parrish	Rod Serling	N/A	June 17, 1960	173-3617
36	36	"A World of His Own"	Ralph Nelson	Richard Matheson	N/A	July 1, 1960	173-3634
