= The Bard (The Twilight Zone) =

- The Twilight Zone episode
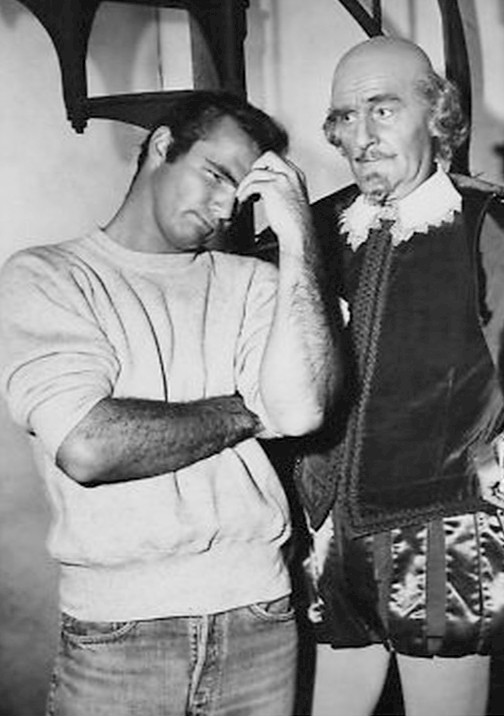
- Burt Reynolds (left) and John Williams (right) as Rocky Rhodes and William Shakespeare, respectively, in a scene from the episode.
- Episode no.: Season 4 Episode 18
- Directed by: David Butler
- Written by: Rod Serling
- Production code: 4852
- Original air date: May 23, 1963
- Running time: 51 minutes

Guest appearances
- Jack Weston as Julius Moomer; John Williams as William Shakespeare; Burt Reynolds as Rocky Rhodes; Henry Lascoe as Gerald Hugo; John McGiver as Mr. Shannon; Howard McNear as Bramhoff; Judy Strangis as Cora; Marge Redmond as Secretary; Doro Merande as Sadie; William Lanteau as Dolan; Clegg Hoyt as Bus driver; John Newton as TV interviewer; John Bose as Daniel Boone; Rudy Bowman as Robert E. Lee

Episode chronology
← Previous "Passage on the Lady Anne"	Next → "In Praise of Pip"
- The Twilight Zone (1959 TV series) (season 4)

"The Bard" is an episode of the American anthology television series The Twilight Zone. It first aired on CBS on May 23, 1963, and was the final episode of the fourth season, which had hour-long episodes. A direct satire of the American television industry, the episode features a character played by Burt Reynolds that is a parody of Marlon Brando, and concerns an inept screenwriter who, through the use of black magic, employs William Shakespeare as his ghostwriter.

Since airing in 1963, the episode has received polarized reactions. It was described as the worst episode of the season upon release and it has been placed near the bottom of episode rankings by /Film and Paste. However, it has been praised by critic Emily St. James and television producer David Chase.

== Plot ==
Julius K. Moomer, a bumbling screenwriter, is becoming desperate for a sale after years of working on unproduced scripts, such as ones about a woman being unaware that her husband is a zombie, a romance between a female scientist and robot, and Belle Starr being president of the Union Pacific Railroad. His agent, Gerald Hugo, mentions a television series to his secretary which causes Julius to beg to write a pilot episode for it. Gerald derides Julius as the show is about black magic and Julius knows nothing about it. However, Julius convinces Gerald to let him research the subject and submit a pilot.

On his arrival at a used bookstore, a book of black magic pulls itself off the shelf, to the confusion of the bookstore owner and Julius. After multiple failed attempts at using the book, Julius accidentally summons William Shakespeare, who says he is at the command of the conjurer and will provide any service. Shakespeare's script The Tragic Cycle is accepted by the television producers despite its archaic language.

Shakespeare is annoyed at Julius' egotism and claiming of sole credit for the scripts. He threatens to leave, stating that his task is finished, but Julius argues that if he stops writing now, Shakespeare will lose his chance at Hollywood fame and become forgotten. Shakespeare says he will attend a rehearsal and continue working for Julius if it does justice to his script. At the rehearsal, Shakespeare is so horrified at the revisions by the sponsor and producers that he assaults lead actor Rocky Rhodes and storms out. Julius's next assignment, a TV special on American history, seems doomed to failure until he remembers his book on black magic, and uses it to conjure up Robert E. Lee, Ulysses S. Grant, Abraham Lincoln, George Washington, Pocahontas, Daniel Boone, Benjamin Franklin, and Theodore Roosevelt to act as consultants.

== Production ==
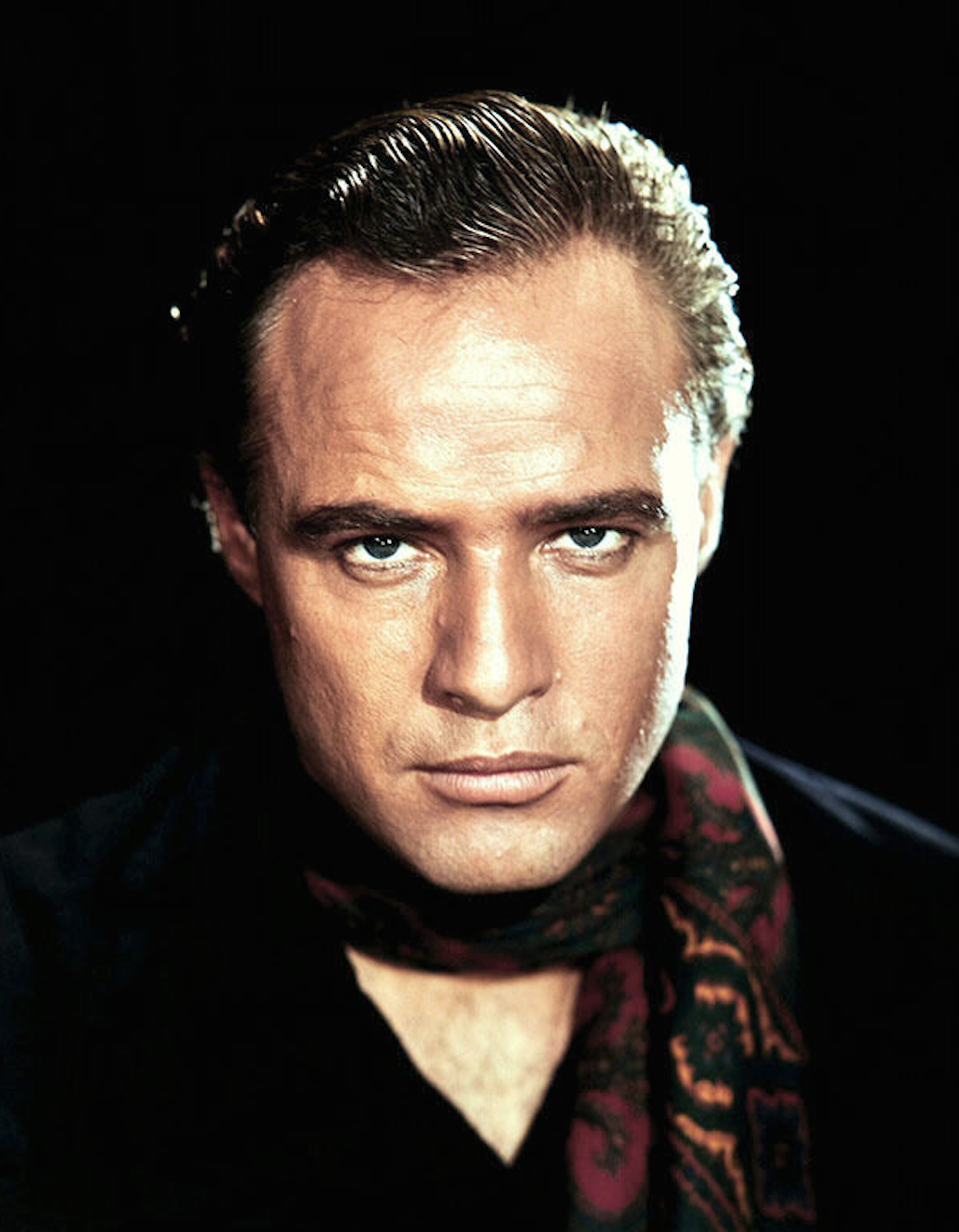
The Bard features a character played by Burt Reynolds that is a parody of Marlon Brando.

The episode aired on May 23, 1963, and was the final episode of the fourth season. CBS extended the length of The Twilight Zone's episodes for the fourth season from 30 minutes to 1 hour. Rod Serling criticized this decision as it led to episodes being "too padded" and that "On Thursday We Leave for Home" was the only "effective" episode of the fourth season.

The Bard was produced by Herbert Hirschman and directed by David Butler, and the music was composed by Fred Steiner. George T. Clemens was the director of photography, art direction was done by George Davis and Edward Carfagno, and Edward Curtiss was the editor. Serling's script for The Bard was a satire of television writing and it was one of six episodes with a major appearance of a historical figure (alongside The Man in the Bottle, Back There, The Passersby, Showdown with Rance McGrew, and He's Alive).

Jack Weston, who plays Moomer, previously appeared on the show in The Monsters Are Due on Maple Street. John Williams, who plays Shakespeare, was known for his work in Alfred Hitchcock's films. Burt Reynolds was selected to play a stand-in for Marlon Brando due to how closely he looked like Brando and his impersonation. An assistant to producer John Conwell knew Reynolds and ask him to play the role. Reynolds' appearance in this episode was considered by Scott Campbell of Far Out to one of the earliest examples of the public feud between him and Brando due to Reynolds "openly mocking" "Brando's signature performative style, accent, and mannerisms as the character Rocky Rhodes", which Campbell believed could have "gotten underneath" his skin.

== Reception and legacy ==
Percy Shain, writing for The Boston Globe, gave the episode 3 out of 5 stars and wrote that the support cast "fleshed out the zany plot". Francis Murphy, writing for The Oregonian, stated that the show drifted into "the worst TV show of the season" with The Bard due to Weston's poor acting and the "great idea" of the script falling "miserably flat". The Bard was listed as the second worst episode of The Twilight Zone by Paste in 2023, and /Film in 2024, only behind "The Incredible World of Horace Ford" in /Film's ranking and "I Dream of Genie" in Paste's ranking. /Film's ranking criticized The Bard for having satire that "lacks bite" and for "being hopelessly unfunny".

Arianna Rebolini selected the episode as the 40th best of the series in a BuzzFeed article, stating that "something just clicks" despite humor not being Serling's "strong suit" and that its satire of the television industry was "ahead of its time". Emily St. James, writing for The A.V. Club, gave it a rating of A−, praising Weston and Williams' acting and humor. David Chase wrote that it was one of his favorite episodes and a portion of the episode was played on TV during a scene of The Sopranos episode Made in America. Marc Scott Zicree, writing in The Twilight Zone Companion, stated that the episode was "both entertaining and accurate".

William Bibbiani, writing for /Film in 2023, noted that one of the script ideas proposed by Moomer was similar to Love, American Style. James Maddox wrote in a Game Rant article that Moomer's reliance on existing works and historical figures rather than making original work was a precursor to ChatGPT and other AI-assisted writing tools.

== Works cited ==
=== Books ===
- Presnell, Don; McGee, Marty (1998). A Critical History of Television's The Twilight Zone, 1959–1964. McFarland & Company. ISBN 978-0-7864-3886-0.
- Zicree, Marc (1982). The Twilight Zone Companion. Bantam Books. ISBN 0553014161.

=== News ===
- Baldwin, Kristen (July 21, 2020). "The Sopranos: David Chase reveals his favorite moments in the series finale". Entertainment Weekly. Archived from the original on March 9, 2025.
- Bibbiani, William (November 4, 2023). "The Twilight Zone Parodied Studio Notes By Having Shakespeare Punch Burt Reynolds". /Film. Archived from the original on March 9, 2025.
- Bria, Bill (September 21, 2024). "The 5 Worst Episodes Of The Twilight Zone, Ranked". /Film. Archived from the original on March 9, 2025.
- Campbell, Scott (April 4, 2024). "Burt Reynolds and Marlon Brando's 40-year feud: "He makes me want to throw up"". Far Out. Archived from the original on April 4, 2025.
- Kozak, Oktay (September 29, 2023). "Every Episode of The Twilight Zone, Ranked from Worst to Best". Paste. Archived from the original on December 7, 2024.
- Maddox, James (November 16, 2023). "The Twilight Zone: 8 Times The Series Predicted The Future". Game Rant. Archived from the original on March 10, 2025.
- Murphy, Francis (May 27, 1963). "Behind The Mike". The Oregonian. p. 15 – via Newspapers.com.
- Rebolini, Arianna (December 30, 2014). "Ranking Every Episode Of "The Twilight Zone"". BuzzFeed. Archived from the original on March 10, 2025.
- Scott, Hugh (December 22, 2023). "32 Huge Stars That Appeared On The Twilight Zone Early In Their Career". Yahoo News. Archived from the original on March 10, 2025.
- Shain, Percy (May 24, 1963). "Would He Bury It TV - Or Praise It?". The Boston Globe. p. 19 – via Newspapers.com.
- St. James, Emily (September 7, 2013). "The Twilight Zone: "Passage On The Lady Anne"/"The Bard"". The A.V. Club. Archived from the original on April 11, 2021.
- Weiss, Josh (October 24, 2025). "Remembering When Burt Reynolds Played Marlon Brando on The Twilight Zone". SYFY. Archived from the original on October 28, 2025.
