= Charles P. Thompson =

American actor

- Charles P. Thompson in The Andy Griffith Show 1962
- Born: January 2, 1891; Philadelphia, Pennsylvania, U.S.
- Died: October 26, 1979 (aged 88); Los Angeles, California, U.S.
- Other name: Charles Thompson
- Occupation: Actor
- Years active: 1925–1972

Charles P. Thompson (January 2, 1891 – October 26, 1979) was an American stage, film, and television actor. Best known for playing Mayberry security guard Asa Breeney on The Andy Griffith Show.

== Career ==
Born in Philadelphia (Pennsylvania), Thompson began his career on Broadway in the 1920s. At age 57, he made his feature film debut as a ticket taker in The Naked City (1948).

During his television career, Thompson portrayed a janitor in the pilot episode, "The Return," of the series Window on Main Street in 1961 and played an old man on Gomer Pyle, U.S.M.C. in the episode "Love Letter to the Sarge" (1965). He also appeared as Doc Williams in Wanted Dead or Alive, two episodes of Gunsmoke, seven episodes of The Andy Griffith Show (five as Asa Breeney and two as a doctor), and four episodes of Bonanza, one of which (1972) was his last appearance on screen.

== Death ==
Thompson died in 1979 at the age of 88 in Los Angeles, California.

== Filmography ==
Year	Title	Role	Notes
1948	The Naked City	Ticket Taker	Uncredited
1958	The Adventures of Jim Bowie	Minister	Episode: Bowie's Baby
1958	Teenage Caveman	Member of the Tribe	
1959-1968	Gunsmoke	Clabe/Milton/Mr. Cross	3 episodes
1959	The Third Man	Doctor Fredrick Bauman	Episode: Dark Island
1959	Father Knows Best	Janitor	Episode: The Meanest Professor
1960	Portrait in Black	Sid	Uncredited
1960	Wanted Dead or Alive	Dr. Williams	Episode: The Cure
1962	Perry Mason	Antique Car Man	Episode: The Case of the Borrowed Baby
1962-1967	The Andy Griffith Show,	Various Roles	7 episodes
1963	The Twilight Zone	Andy Praskins	Episode: Printer's Devil
1963	Lassie	George Watts	Episode: Project Bluebirds
1963	For Love or Money	Uncle Ben	Uncredited
1964	Invitation to a Gunfighter	Townsman	Uncredited
1965	Death Valley Days	Captain	Episode: A Bell for Volcano
1965	Branded	Telegrapher	Episode: The Vindicators
1965	The Fugitive	Mr. Duffield	Episode: Moon Child
1967	Hot Rods to Hell	Charley	
1967	Green Acres	Dr. Wilson	Episode: Music to Milk By
1969-1970	Bonanza	Storekeeper/Claude/Gold Assayer	3 episodes
1969	The Trouble with Girls	Cabbie	
1969	Some Kind of a Nut	Super	Uncredited
1971	Ironside	Pop Bosner	Episode: Contract: Kill Ironside
