= Rudy Bowman =

American actor (1890–1972)

- Born: Rudolph Marcy Bowman; December 15, 1890; Kansas, U.S.
- Died: October 29, 1972 (aged 81); Los Angeles, California, U.S.
- Occupation: Actor
- Years active: 1939–1970
- Spouse: Gertrude Creason (1914–1972)
- Children: 4

Rudy Bowman (born Rudolph Marcy Bowman; December 15, 1890 – October 29, 1972) was an American actor.

== Early life and career ==
Bowman was born in Kansas. During World War I, Bowman's throat was injured by shrapnel, causing him to lose his voice. His recovery and subsequent work as an actor were featured on The Rudy Bowman Story, a program broadcast on CBS radio on August 17, 1949.

Bowman played mostly small and uncredited roles in various westerns, such as playing a juror in 1956's Gunsmoke episode “Custer” and in its 1961 episode "The Squaw”. His film appearances include She Wore a Yellow Ribbon (1949). He also guest starred as Robert E. Lee in The Twilight Zone episode "The Bard".

== Personal life and death ==
From April 23, 1914 until his death, Bowman was married to Gertrude Creason, with whom he had three daughters and one son.

Bowman died on October 29, 1972, in Los Angeles, California, at the age of 81.
