= Cyril Delevanti =

English actor (1887–1975)

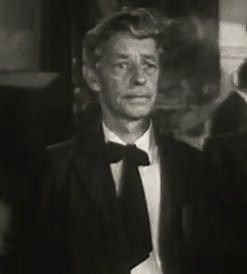
- Delevanti in The Phantom of 42nd Street (1945)
- Born: Harry Cyril Delevanti; 23 February 1887; London, England
- Died: 13 December 1975 (aged 88); Los Angeles, California, U.S.
- Resting place: Forest Lawn Memorial Park, Glendale, California, US
- Other names: Cyril Delavanti; Syril Delevanti
- Occupation: Actor
- Years active: 1921–1974
- Spouse: Eva Kittie Peel (m. 1913; died 1975)
- Children: 3
- Relatives: Ford Beebe (son-in-law)

Harry Cyril Delevanti (23 February 1887 – 13 December 1975) was an English character actor, with a long career in American films during the Golden Age of Hollywood. He appeared in some 170 productions, and was nominated for a Golden Globe Award for Best Supporting Actor – Motion Picture for his performance in John Huston's The Night of the Iguana (1964).

== Early years ==
Harry Cyril Delevanti was born on 23 February 1889 in London, to music professor Edward Prospero Richard Delevanti and his wife Mary Elizabeth (née Rowbotham). His father was of Italian descent.

== Career ==
Delevanti had a career as an actor on the English stage and, after his emigration to the United States in 1921, performed on the American stage throughout the 1920s. He also worked as drama coach, notably to Douglas Fairbanks and James Craig. During the 1930s, he was the artistic director of little theatre in Houston, Texas.

His first film appearance was in Devotion (1931). In 1938, credited with his first name misspelled 'Syril', Delevanti portrayed Wing Fu in the serial Red Barry; shortly thereafter, the film's director, Ford Beebe, would marry Delevanti's daughter, Kitty. From the 1940s, Delevanti appeared in many small roles, frequently uncredited, in such films as Phantom of the Opera (1943), Confidential Agent (1945), Deception (1946) and Forever Amber (1947), Charlie Chaplin's Monsieur Verdoux (1947) and Limelight (1952), David and Bathsheba (1951), Les Girls (1957), Bye Bye Birdie (1963), and Mary Poppins (1964).

In 1957 he played a superstitious king (with John Banner as his concerned valet) in Adventures of Superman. In 1958, Delevanti was cast as the printer Lucius Coin in all twenty-six episodes of the NBC western television series, Jefferson Drum, starring Jeff Richards. He made two guest appearances on Perry Mason during the first and final (ninth) seasons of the series. In 1957 he played florist Mr. Tulloch in "The Case of the Silent Partner". In 1965, he played bookie Craig Jefferson in "The Case of the Silent Six".

Delevanti made guest-starring appearances on Dennis the Menace, US Marshal, The Fugitive, Gunsmoke, The Dick Van Dyke Show, Have Gun – Will Travel, The Tall Man, Bourbon Street Beat, Voyage to the Bottom of the Sea, The Virginian, Daniel Boone, Alfred Hitchcock Presents, Mission: Impossible, It Takes a Thief, Ironside, The Untouchables, Science Fiction Theater, The Twilight Zone (in the episodes "A Penny for Your Thoughts", "The Silence", "Passage on the Lady Anne", and "A Piano in the House"), Bob Hope Presents the Chrysler Theatre (in the episodes "Time for Elizabeth", "Cops and Robbers", and "The Game"), Peter Gunn, and Dragnet.

He continued to act in films, such as The Night of the Iguana (1964, nominated for a Golden Globe Award as Best Supporting Actor), The Killing of Sister George (1968), and Bedknobs and Broomsticks (1971).

== Personal life ==
In January 1913, Delevanti married fellow performer—and recent Arcadians co-star—Eva "Kitty" Peel; they had two children: Kitty Winnifred Delevanti and Cyril Harold Delevanti Jr. In the early 1950s, they operated a toy shop in the Los Angeles area.

=== Death ===
After losing his wife four months prior, Delevanti died of lung cancer on 13 December 1975, in Hollywood. He was survived by his daughter and by Cyril Jr., who died in November 1977.

== Credited filmography ==
- Devotion (1931) – Reporter (uncredited)
- Arrowsmith (1931) – committee member (uncredited)
- Red Barry (1938, Serial) – Wing Fu (as Syril Delevanti)
- A Dispatch from Reuter's (1940) – Cockney News Vendor (uncredited)
- Man Hunt (1941) – Cab Driver (uncredited)
- Confirm or Deny (1941) – Bellhop (scenes deleted)
- Night Monster (1942) – Torque
- Journey for Margaret (1942) – Stage Manager (uncredited)
- When Johnny Comes Marching Home (1942) – Professor (uncredited)
- The Adventures of Smilin' Jack (1943, Serial) – Mah Ling / Han Po
- Frankenstein Meets the Wolf Man (1943) – Freddy Jolly—Graverobber (uncredited)
- All by Myself (1943) – Mr. Vincent (uncredited)
- Two Tickets to London (1943) – Scottish Man (uncredited)
- Phantom of the Opera (1943) – Bookkeeper (uncredited)
- Holy Matrimony (1943) – Townsman (uncredited)
- Son of Dracula (1943) – Dr. Peters, the Coroner (uncredited)
- The Lodger (1944) – Stagehand (uncredited)
- The Impostor (1944) – Bartender (uncredited)
- Phantom Lady (1944) – Claude (uncredited)
- Her Primitive Man (1944) – Scientist (uncredited)
- The Invisible Man's Revenge (1944) – Malty Bill – Shopkeeper (uncredited)
- Shadow of Suspicion (1944) – Mr. Lewis (uncredited)
- Ministry of Fear (1944) – Railroad Agent (uncredited)
- Enter Arsène Lupin (1944) – Wine Expert (uncredited)
- Double Exposure (1944) – Henry – Waiter (uncredited)
- Jungle Queen (1945) – Rogers (uncredited)
- The Jade Mask (1945) – Roth
- Sherlock Holmes and the House of Fear (1945) – Stanley Raeburn (uncredited)
- The Phantom of 42nd Street (1945) – Roberts
- The Shanghai Cobra (1945) – Detective Larkin (uncredited)
- The Fatal Witness (1945) – Second Coroner (uncredited)
- Scotland Yard Investigator (1945) – Police Surgeon (uncredited)
- Kitty (1945) – All Hot Hawker (uncredited)
- This Love of Ours (1945) – Secretary (uncredited)
- Confidential Agent (1945) – Businessman (uncredited)
- Captain Tugboat Annie (1945) – Fred
- The Daltons Ride Again (1945) – Jennings (uncredited)
- Three Strangers (1946) – Stockbroker (voice, uncredited)
- The Shadow Returns (1946) – John Adams
- Lost City of the Jungle (1946, Serial) – Representative to Peace Foundation [Ch. 1] (uncredited)
- Dressed to Kill (1946) – Convict at Dartmoor Prison (uncredited)
- The Mysterious Mr. M (1946) – Professor Jackson Parker (uncredited)
- Deception (1946) – Beggar (uncredited)
- I'll Be Yours (1947) – Businessman (uncredited)
- Monsieur Verdoux (1947) – Postman (uncredited)
- Lured (1947) – Medical Examiner (uncredited)
- Forever Amber (1947) – Cobbler (uncredited)
- The Emperor Waltz (1948) – Diplomat (uncredited)
- David and Bathsheba (1951) – Undetermined Minor Role (uncredited)
- Limelight (1952) – Griffin – a Clown (uncredited)
- Science Fiction Theater (1955-1956) (S1E30) “Postcard from Barcelona”, (S2E9) “Mind Machine", (S2E20) "Miracle of Doctor Dove", (S2E39) "The Strange Lodger"
- Gunsmoke (1956) (S1E15) “No Handcuffs” - Jailer, (1956) (S2E9) “The Mistake" - Hearse Driver
- Alfred Hitchcock Presents (1956) (Season 1 Episode 19: "The Derelicts") - Alfred J. Sloane
- D-Day the Sixth of June (1956) – Coat Room Attendant (uncredited)
- Johnny Tremain (1957) – Mr. Robert Newman (uncredited)
- Trooper Hook (1957) – Junius
- Les Girls (1957) – Fanatic with 'What Is Truth' Sign (uncredited)
- Ride Out for Revenge (1957) – Preacher
- Sabu and the Magic Ring (1957) – Abdul
- Gun Fever (1958) – Jerry
- Teacher's Pet (1958) – Copy Man (uncredited)
- Kings Go Forth (1958) – Blairs' Butler (uncredited)
- I Bury the Living (1958) – William Isham (uncredited)
- Alfred Hitchcock Presents (1959) (Season 5 Episode 12: "Specialty of the House") - Club Member (uncredited)
- Alfred Hitchcock Presents (1960) (Season 5 Episode 36: "Letter of Credit") - Josiah Wingate
- From the Terrace (1960) – MacHardie's Secretary (uncredited)
- Paradise Alley (1962) – Grandpa
- The Twilight Zone (1963) (Season 4 Episode 17: "Passage on the Lady Anne") - Officer
- Dead Ringer (1964) – Henry, the Butler
- The Night of the Iguana (1964) – Nonno
- Mary Poppins (1964) – Mr. Grubbs (uncredited)
- The Greatest Story Ever Told (1965) – Melchior
- Oh Dad, Poor Dad, Mamma's Hung You in the Closet and I'm Feelin' So Sad(1967) – Hawkins
- Counterpoint (1968) – Tartzoff
- The Killing of Sister George (1968) – Ted Baker
- Macho Callahan (1970) – Old man
- Bedknobs and Broomsticks (1971) – Elderly Farmer
- Soylent Green (1973) – Book # 4
- The Girl Most Likely to... (1973) – Chaplain
- Black Eye (1974) – Talbot (final film role)
