= One for the Angels =

- The Twilight Zone episode
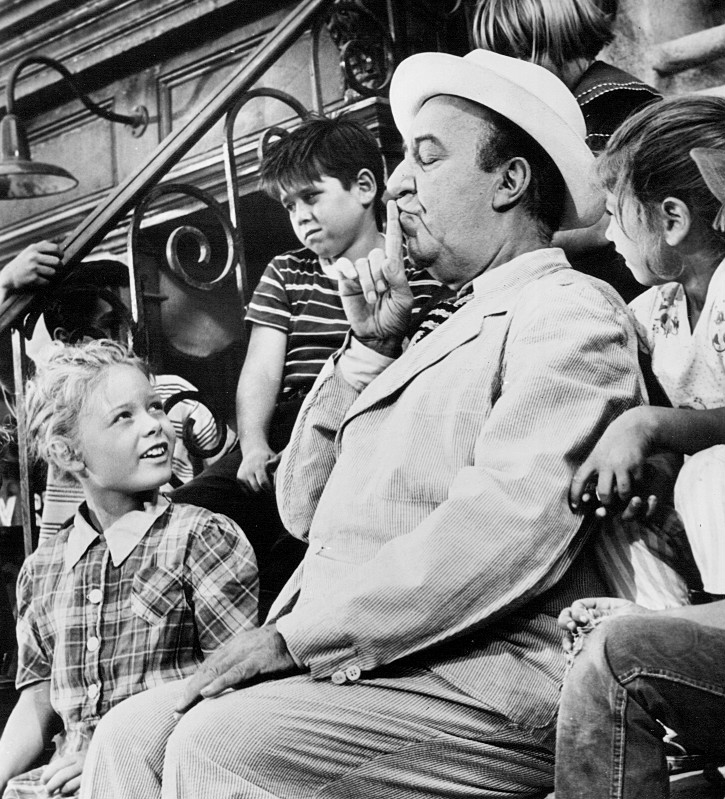
- Bookman meets with the neighborhood children to hand out unsold toys
- Episode no.: Season 1 Episode 2
- Directed by: Robert Parrish
- Written by: Rod Serling
- Cinematography by: George T. Clemens
- Production code: 173-3608
- Original air date: October 9, 1959

Guest appearances
- Ed Wynn as Louis J. "Lou" Bookman; Murray Hamilton as Mr. Death; Dana Dillaway as Maggie Polanski

Episode chronology
← Previous "Where Is Everybody?"	Next → "Mr. Denton on Doomsday"
- The Twilight Zone (1959 TV series, season 1)

"One for the Angels" is the second episode of the American anthology television series The Twilight Zone. It originally aired on October 9, 1959, on CBS television.

== Opening narration ==
Street scene: Summer. The present. Man on a sidewalk named Lou Bookman, age sixtyish. Occupation: pitchman. Lou Bookman, a fixture of the summer, a rather minor component to a hot July, a nondescript, commonplace little man whose life is a treadmill built out of sidewalks. And in just a moment, Lou Bookman will have to concern himself with survival – because as of three o'clock this hot July afternoon, he'll be stalked by Mr. Death.

== Plot ==
Lou Bookman is a kindly sidewalk pitchman who sells and repairs toys, notions, and trinkets, and is adored by the neighborhood children. One day, Bookman is visited by Mr. Death, who tells him that he is to die at midnight of natural causes. Unable to dissuade Death by convincing him he has great achievements in the works that must be completed, Bookman eventually convinces him to wait until he has made his greatest sales pitch: "one for the angels". After Death has agreed to the extension and asks when this grand pitch might take place, Bookman announces he is retiring, smug that he has successfully cheated Death. Death concedes Bookman has found a loophole in their agreement, but warns that someone else now has to die in his place. Death chooses Maggie, a little girl who lives in Bookman's apartment building and is a friend of his.

Maggie is hit by a truck and falls into a coma; Death intends to be in her room at the stroke of midnight to claim her. Bookman begs Death to take him instead, but Death is adamant; a deal is a deal. That night as midnight approaches, Bookman gets out his wares and begins to eloquently boost one item after another, making the greatest sales pitch of his life — one so great that he seemingly entices Death himself to buy item after item until all of the wares in his case are sold. With one minute remaining before midnight, he offers his "Pièce de Résistance", he pitches himself as the ultimate manservant in order to convince Death to take him in Maggie's place. Midnight passes and Death misses his appointment with Maggie. Maggie awakens and, as her doctor leaves the apartment and sees Bookman, he assures him that Maggie will live.

Death observes that by making that great sales pitch, Bookman has met the original terms of their deal. Now content and willing to accept his fate, Bookman goes to leave with Death. He fetches his case of wares to bring with him, remarking that "you never know who might need something up there". He looks to Death, adding hopefully, "Up there?" and Death replies, "Up there, Mr. Bookman. You made it."

== Closing narration ==
Louis J. Bookman, age sixtyish. Occupation: pitchman. Formerly a fixture of the summer, formerly a rather minor component to a hot July. But, throughout his life, a man beloved by the children, and therefore, a most important man. Couldn't happen, you say? Probably not in most places – but it did happen in the Twilight Zone.

== Preview for next week's story ==
Next week, we invite you to take a walk down a Western frontier street at the elbow of a doomed gunman, whose salvation lies in nothing less than a magic potion, and a Colt 45. Mr. Dan Duryea stars in "Mr. Denton on Doomsday." Next week on The Twilight Zone. We hope you'll be able to be with us. Thank you and good night.
