= Elegy (The Twilight Zone) =

- The Twilight Zone episode
- Episode no.: Season 1 Episode 20
- Directed by: Douglas Heyes
- Written by: Charles Beaumont
- Based on: "Elegy" by Charles Beaumont
- Production code: 173-3625
- Original air date: February 19, 1960

Guest appearances
- Cecil Kellaway as Jeremy Wickwire; Jeff Morrow as Kurt Meyers; Kevin Hagen as Captain James Webber; Don Dubbins as Peter Kirby

Episode chronology
← Previous "The Purple Testament"	Next → "Mirror Image"
- The Twilight Zone (1959 TV series, season 1)

"Elegy" is the twentieth episode of the American television anthology series The Twilight Zone. It originally aired on February 19, 1960, on CBS. The episode was based on a short story by Charles Beaumont published in the February 1953 issue of Imagination: Stories of Science and Fantasy.

== Opening narration ==
The time is the day after tomorrow. The place: a far corner of the universe. A cast of characters: three men lost amongst the stars. Three men sharing the common urgency of all men lost. They're looking for home. And in a moment, they'll find home; not a home that is a place to be seen, but a strange unexplainable experience to be felt.

== Plot ==
In September 2185, while on a routine geological mission, astronauts Meyers, Webber, and Kirby land their spaceship on a remote asteroid 655 million miles away from Earth after running low on fuel. They find that the atmosphere and gravity are identical to Earth's. Opening the hatch to the spaceship, they find they have landed near a farm. They initially think they have traveled back in time, due to the old tractor they find, although they notice that there are two suns in the sky. They find a farmer gazing off into the distance and try to get his attention, but realize he is just a statue.

They hear band music in the distance, and follow it to a town to find the music is being played on a speaker; the band members are also just statues. The astronauts are disturbed by their surroundings as everything and everyone is eerily motionless. They hypothesize that time may pass at a different rate, but a nearby grandfather clock without hands leads them to believe that time passes normally and that there is some other reason for everyone's motionlessness. They are further confused as the statues appear to feel like flesh, or something similar to it. They decide to separate to explore the town. One astronaut finds an odd beauty contest where an unattractive woman has been crowned the winner. After the astronaut departs, a man in the audience turns and smiles.

Converging on the center of town, they are startled to find someone who does move: Jeremy Wickwire, the caretaker of this place. He is told by the men that a nuclear war destroyed much of the Earth in 1985, and that it has taken two hundred years to recover from it. Wickwire explains to the astronauts that the asteroid they have landed on is an exclusive cemetery called "Happy Glades", founded in 1973, where rich people can live out their life's greatest fantasy after they die. The town is one of many areas where people may be placed; others include the Roman era, the Egyptian era, and the Wild West. This town is the most popular because it represents a time in American culture where creature comforts were most abundant.

Wickwire serves the three men wine and asks each man what his greatest wish is. All three reply that they wish they were on their ship heading for home. Wickwire misunderstood who the astronauts were, thinking they were from the Happy Glades organization. He explains the reason Happy Glades exists is because it's not possible to have peace on Earth. Wickwire (who explains that he is a robot that has been deactivated for "about 200 years" and only turns on for occasional duties) apologizes to them, and explains that it is his job to ensure peace and tranquility at "Happy Glades". Suddenly, they realize that their drinks have been poisoned with what Wickwire refers to as "eternifying fluid". As the men are dying, the astronauts plead for an antidote, and that they mean no harm. Wickwire responds that they "are men, and while there are men, there can be no peace."

Later, Wickwire installs the embalmed astronauts in their ship, posing them at their posts as if they were on their way home.

== Closing narration ==
Kirby, Webber, and Meyers, three men lost. They shared a common wish—a simple one, really. They wanted to be aboard their ship headed for home. And fate—a laughing fate—a practical jokester with a smile that stretched across the stars, saw to it that they got their wish with just one reservation: the wish came true, but only in the Twilight Zone.
