= The Silence (The Twilight Zone) =

- The Twilight Zone episode
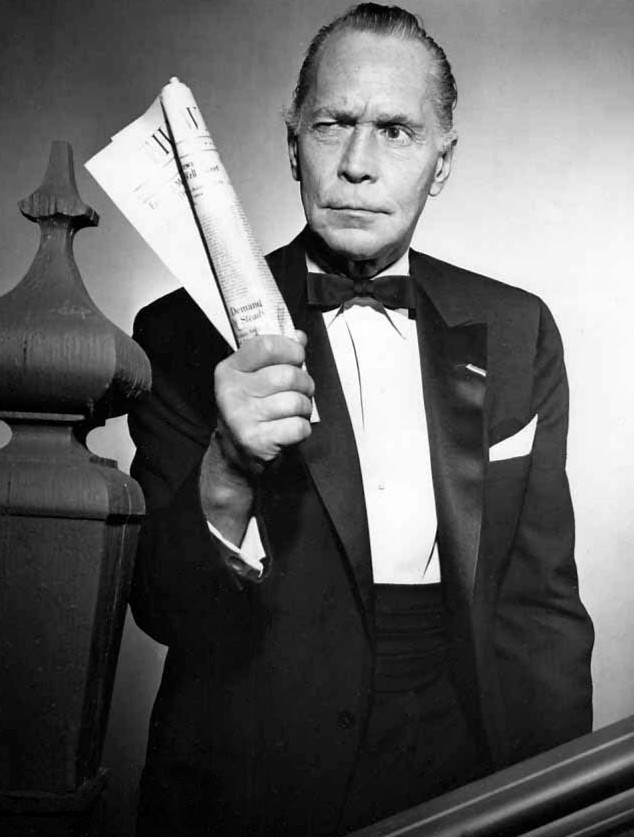
- Franchot Tone as "Archie" in "The Silence"
- Episode no.: Season 2 Episode 25
- Directed by: Boris Sagal
- Written by: Rod Serling
- Production code: 173-3658
- Original air date: April 28, 1961

Guest appearances
- Franchot Tone as Archie Taylor; Liam Sullivan as Jamie Tennyson; Jonathan Harris as George Alfred; Cyril Delevanti as Franklin; Everett Glass as Club Member; Felix Locher as Club Member

Episode chronology
← Previous "The Rip Van Winkle Caper"	Next → "Shadow Play"
- The Twilight Zone (1959 TV series) (season 2)

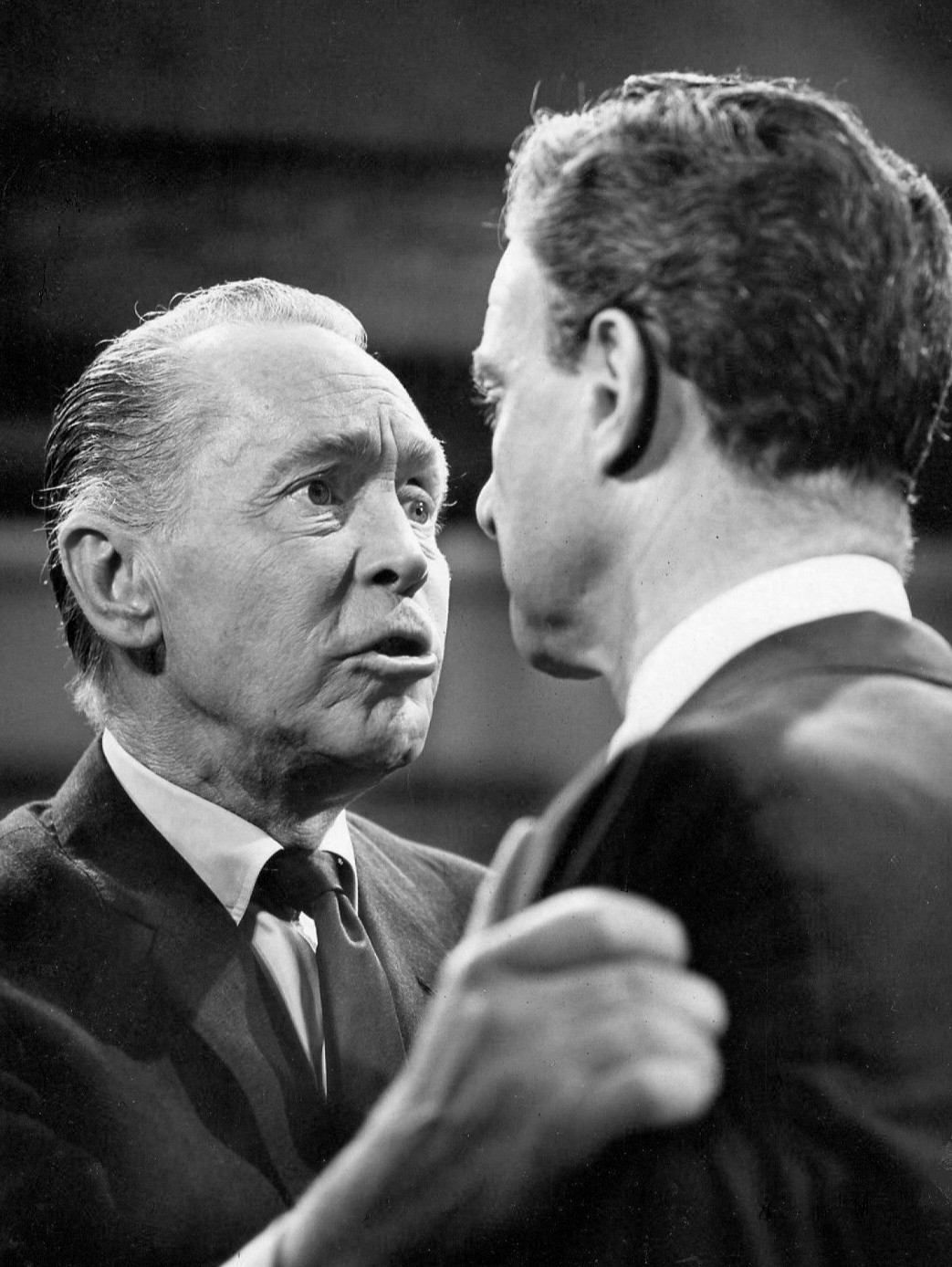
Franchot Tone as "Archie" and Jonathan Harris as "George"

"The Silence" is episode 61 (season 2, episode 25) of the American television anthology series The Twilight Zone. The plot of this episode was based in part on the short story "The Bet" by Anton Chekhov. In his introduction to the episode, host Rod Serling describes it as "the story of possibly the strangest bet ever to occur in the annals of chance." It originally aired on April 28, 1961 on CBS. It is one of the few Twilight Zone episodes to feature no supernatural or sci-fi elements.

== Opening narration ==
The note that this man is carrying across a club room is in the form of a proposed wager, but it's the kind of wager that comes without precedent. It stands alone in the annals of bet-making as the strangest game of chance ever offered by one man to another. In just a moment, we'll see the terms of the wager and what young Mr. Tennyson does about it. And in the process, we'll witness all parties spin a wheel of chance in a very bizarre casino called - the Twilight Zone.

== Plot ==
Colonel Archie Taylor, a gruff aristocrat, has difficulty enjoying his men's club because of the constant chatter of fellow member Jamie Tennyson. In an effort to shut Tennyson up, Taylor bets him US$500,000 (equivalent to $5,400,000 in 2025) that he cannot remain silent for one year. If Tennyson accepts the wager, a small glass-walled apartment will be erected in the club's game room, where he will be monitored by microphones so that he cannot speak without detection. He may only write notes to communicate, and the other members may observe him through the glass.

An offended Tennyson agrees, needing the money to pay the debts incurred by his wife's exorbitant spending. He proposes that Taylor put a check on deposit in his name, but the club members reject this request as Taylor has a strong standing of honor and credit. "My courage against your credit" (Tennyson's words to Taylor) is accepted by both and the challenge begins the following night.

Taylor initially expects to win within a few weeks, but Tennyson surprises him by remaining silent for nine months. Taylor gets nervous and offers to pay Tennyson $1,000 to call off the bet. When the effort fails, he suggests that Tennyson's wife is planning to leave him for another man. She has never responded to any of Tennyson's several written requests for a visit, giving weight to Taylor's insinuations. Taylor increases his offer to $6,000, but an anguished Tennyson still refuses to end the bet.

On the last evening of the year, club member Alfred tells Taylor his behavior over the past months, particularly using Tennyson's wife as a threat, has severely damaged the club's esteem for him. As the clock chimes to officially signal that the one year has passed, Tennyson emerges to the congratulations of his fellow club members before he approaches Taylor and silently puts his hand out for the money. The embarrassed Taylor admits that he had lost his fortune several years earlier. He praises Tennyson's resolve and character and then announces his decision to resign from the club.

The distraught Tennyson scribbles furiously on a sheet of paper, perplexing the other men, who wonder why he does not speak. Taylor reads the note aloud: "I knew I would not be able to keep my part of the bargain, so one year ago I had the nerves to my vocal cords severed." Tennyson tearfully displays the scar on his throat from the operation, which he has concealed for the past year under scarves and turtlenecks.

== Closing narration ==
Mr. Jamie Tennyson, who almost won a bet, but who discovered somewhat belatedly that gambling can be a most unproductive pursuit, even with loaded dice, marked cards, or, as in his case, some severed vocal cords. For somewhere beyond him, a wheel was turned, and his number came up black thirteen. If you don't believe it, ask the croupier, the very special one who handles roulette – in The Twilight Zone.

== Bibliography ==
- Zicree, Marc Scott (1982). The Twilight Zone Companion (2nd ed.). Sillman-James Press.
- DeVoe, Bill (2008). Trivia from The Twilight Zone. Albany, GA: Bear Manor Media. ISBN 978-1-59393-136-0.
- Grams, Martin (2008). The Twilight Zone: Unlocking the Door to a Television Classic. Churchville, MD: OTR Publishing. ISBN 978-0-9703310-9-0.
