= Printer's Devil =

- The Twilight Zone episode
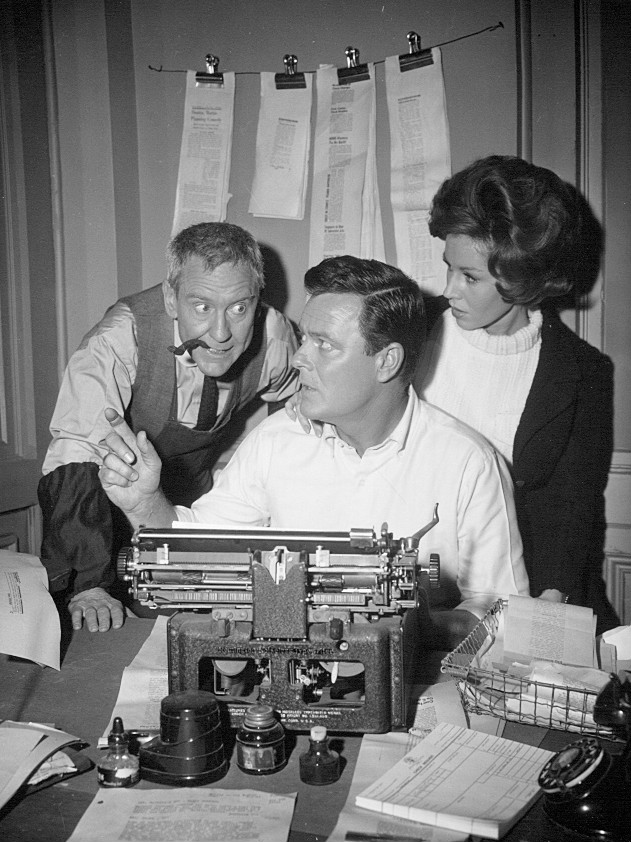
- Burgess Meredith, Robert Sterling and Pat Crowley
- Episode no.: Season 4 Episode 9
- Directed by: Ralph Senensky
- Written by: Charles Beaumont
- Based on: "The Devil, You Say?" by Charles Beaumont
- Production code: 4864
- Original air date: February 28, 1963

Guest appearances
- Burgess Meredith; Robert Sterling; Pat Crowley; Ray Teal; Charles P. Thompson; Doris Kemper; Camille Franklin

Episode chronology
← Previous "Miniature"	Next → "No Time Like the Past"
- The Twilight Zone (1959 TV series) (season 4)

"Printer's Devil" is episode 111 of the American television anthology series The Twilight Zone. The title comes from the expression “printer's devil”, an apprentice in the industry.

The initial plot set-up is based in part on the well-known deal with the devil motif: a mysterious, seemingly eccentric man (played by frequent Twilight Zone actor Burgess Meredith) brings success to a local newspaper by working as its reporter and linotype operator, eventually revealing that he wants the editor's soul in exchange. This hour-long episode was written by Charles Beaumont, and based on his 1951 short story "The Devil, You Say".

== Opening narration ==
Take away a man's dream, fill him with whiskey and despair, send him to a lonely bridge, let him stand there all by himself looking down at the black water, and try to imagine the thoughts that are in his mind. You can't, I can't. But there's someone who can—and that someone is seated next to Douglas Winter right now. The car is headed back toward town, but its real destination is the Twilight Zone.

== Plot ==
Douglas Winter, the editor of a newspaper called The Dansburg Courier, is being pushed out of business by a big conglomerate paper, The Gazette. Though Douglas is an exceptionally kind and accommodating boss, his staff begin abandoning him when he becomes unable to pay them. After the linotype operator quits, the only remaining employees of The Courier are Douglas himself and his girlfriend, Jackie Benson. Douglas is an earnest dreamer who sees The Courier as his purpose in life; faced with its demise, he drives to a bridge to contemplate suicide. There he is approached by a strange man who introduces himself as "Mr. Smith", and says he came to town hoping to join The Courier as a linotype operator and reporter. Even after witnessing Mr. Smith's speed and precision with the linotype machine, Doug tries to talk him out of it, saying he cannot pay him or even resume operation of The Courier due to an overdue debt payment to the bank of nearly $5,000. Mr. Smith immediately lends him the $5,000.

Shortly after his hiring, Mr. Smith produces a report of a bank robbery that occurred just a half hour before. Business booms for the little newspaper, as Mr. Smith scoops The Gazette on dramatic news stories, with special editions which sometimes hit the streets barely two hours after the events happen. The owner of The Gazette, Mr. Franklin, offers to buy out The Courier. Though Douglas himself doubts that The Courier can stand up to Franklin's monopolizing tactics, assuming his recent success is down to luck, he refuses his offer. The day after, a fire burns down The Gazette building. When an edition of The Courier goes on sale just two hours after, Franklin accuses Doug of arson. Doug has witnesses to account for his whereabouts at the time, and when he asks Mr. Smith if he caused the fire, Smith successfully dodges the question.

Jackie, still suspicious of Mr. Smith, prods Douglas for information on where he came from, and says he should get rid of him now that the $5,000 loan has been repaid. Douglas refuses, and becomes irritable when she asks what he was doing at the bridge where he met Smith.

At last Mr. Smith reveals why he joined The Courier: he wants Doug to sign a contract assuring Mr. Smith's continued services in exchange for Doug's soul. When Doug is reluctant, Mr. Smith uses a variation of doublethink, arguing that while he believes himself to be the devil, he is clearly mad, and to a sane sophisticated man like Doug things like souls and the devil clearly do not exist. Doug signs the contract.

Eventually, however, he comes to the conclusion that Mr. Smith is somehow causing the events that he writes about, and tells Mr. Smith he wants him gone. Smith says that is impossible now that the contract has been signed, and writes a story about Jackie being injured in an auto accident at 11:30—an hour and a half in the future. He tells Douglas that when he joined The Courier he modified the linotype machine so that anything typed on it happens, and will write that Jackie died of her injuries unless Douglas kills himself. In this way Smith could immediately claim his soul and move on to other clients, instead of having to work at The Courier for the rest of Douglas's natural life. Douglas tosses aside the offered gun and goes frantically searching for Jackie. Meanwhile, she confronts Mr. Smith. He agrees to leave town if she gives him a lift, and asks to drive.

Unable to find Jackie, Doug returns to The Courier building and uses the linotype machine to write a new story. The car with Jackie and Mr. Smith runs off the road, but Jackie is uninjured, and Mr. Smith has vanished. Doug shows a confused Jackie the story he wrote, which says that Mr. Smith left town at 11:29, and that his contract with Doug was declared void due to Doug's not fully understanding the terms of the agreement. Douglas resumes running The Courier after having the infernal linotype machine destroyed, and hauled away.

== Closing narration ==
Exit the infernal machine, and with it his satanic majesty, Lucifer, prince of darkness—otherwise known as Mr. Smith. He's gone, but not for good; that wouldn't be like him—he's gone for bad. And he might be back, with another ticket....to The Twilight Zone.

== Cast ==
- Burgess Meredith as Mr. Smith
- Robert Sterling as Douglas Winter
- Pat Crowley as Jackie Benson
- Ray Teal as Mr. Franklin
- Charles P. Thompson as Andy Praskins
- Doris Kemper as Landlady
- Camille Franklin as Molly
