= Queen of the Nile (The Twilight Zone) =

- The Twilight Zone episode
- Episode no.: Season 5 Episode 23
- Directed by: John Brahm
- Written by: Jerry Sohl; (credited to Charles Beaumont)
- Production code: 2626
- Original air date: March 6, 1964

Guest appearances
- Ann Blyth as Pamela Morris/Constance Taylor; Lee Philips as Jordan Herrick; Celia Lovsky as Viola Draper; Ruth Phillips as Charlotte; Frank Ferguson as Krueger; James Tyler as Mr. Jackson

Episode chronology
← Previous "An Occurrence at Owl Creek Bridge"	Next → "What's in the Box"
- The Twilight Zone (1959 TV series) (season 5)

"Queen of the Nile" is episode 143 of the American television anthology series The Twilight Zone. In this episode, a journalist becomes romantically involved with a dangerous, secretly immortal movie star.

== Opening narration ==
Jordan Herrick, syndicated columnist, whose work appears in more than a hundred newspapers. By nature a cynic, a disbeliever, caught for the moment by a lovely vision. He knows the vision he's seen is no dream; she is Pamela Morris, renowned movie star, whose name is a household word and whose face is known to millions. What Mr. Herrick does not know is that he has also just looked into the face—of the Twilight Zone.

== Plot ==
Chicago columnist Jordan Herrick visits actress Pamela Morris, a 38-year-old woman known for her beauty and vitality, for an interview. In Pamela's manor he notices a painting of her that is dated 1940. Pamela still looks just as she did in the painting. When questioned on this, she says the painter drew her when she was a child with a projection of what she would look like as an adult, and deflects questions about her age. Pamela and Jordan flirt during the interview and make dinner plans for that night. As Jordan is leaving, an old woman whom Pamela introduced as her mother, Mrs. Draper, warns him to never come back. Mrs. Draper says that she is actually Pamela's daughter.

During his date with Pamela, Jordan mentions that he is from Chicago, and Pamela recalls that she had played there once at a particular theater. Jordan mentions what Mrs. Draper had said. Pamela claims Mrs. Draper is mentally ill, but after the date, Herrick calls his editor and asks him to research Pamela's first film, The Queen of the Nile. The editor reveals that the film was a remake of a silent movie filmed on location in Egypt. Leading lady Constance Taylor was apparently killed in a cave-in near the end of the shooting. The editor compares photos of Constance and Pamela in the same role and says they look alike. The editor also reveals that the theater where Pamela claims to have played was torn down 40 years earlier. Jordan asks the editor to dig up articles on every man Pamela has ever been involved with.

Jordan returns to the manor and confronts Pamela with his discovery. Pamela drugs Jordan's coffee and then places a scarab beetle on his unconscious body. The beetle drains his life until he has turned to dust. She then applies the scarab to her own chest.

The episode ends with another young and handsome columnist arriving to interview Pamela, starting the cycle once again. In the closing narration, it is hinted that Pamela is actually Cleopatra VII, and that she has lived for more than 2,000 years.

== Closing narration ==
Everybody knows Pamela Morris, the beautiful and eternally young movie star. Or does she have another name, even more famous, an Egyptian name from centuries past? It's best not to be too curious, lest you wind up like Jordan Herrick, a pile of dust and old clothing discarded in the endless eternity of the Twilight Zone.

== Notes ==
- The footage of Herrick aging is an old movie trick: the same type as used in “Long Live Walter Jameson”.
- The footage of the victim's body becoming dust is recycled footage from “Long Live Walter Jameson”.
- The theme of a femme fatale woman who seduces and kills men to stay immortal is in the classic poem “La Belle Dame sans Merci”.
