= Judgment Night (The Twilight Zone) =

- The Twilight Zone episode
- Episode no.: Season 1 Episode 10
- Directed by: John Brahm
- Written by: Rod Serling
- Production code: 173-3604
- Original air date: December 4, 1959

Guest appearances
- Nehemiah Persoff as Carl Lanser; Ben Wright as Captain Wilbur; Patrick Macnee as First Officer; James Franciscus as Lt. Mueller; Hugh Sanders as Potter; Leslie Bradley as Major Devereaux; Deirdre Owens as Miss Stanley; Kendrick Huxham as Bartender; Barry Bernard as Engineer; Richard Peel as 1st Steward; Donald Journeaux as 2nd Steward

Episode chronology
← Previous "Perchance to Dream"	Next → "And When the Sky Was Opened"
- The Twilight Zone (1959 TV series, season 1)

"Judgment Night" is the tenth episode of the American television anthology series The Twilight Zone. In this episode, a passenger aboard a British cargo liner has no memory of how he came aboard, and is tormented by unexpected clues to his true identity and a sense that the ship is headed toward impending doom.

== Opening narration ==
Her name is the SS Queen of Glasgow. Her registry: British. Gross tonnage: five thousand. Age: Indeterminate. At this moment she's one day out of Liverpool, her destination New York. Duly recorded on the ship's log is the sailing time, course to destination, weather conditions, temperature, longitude and latitude. But what is never recorded in a log is the fear that washes over a deck like fog and ocean spray. Fear like the throbbing strokes of engine pistons, each like a heartbeat, parceling out every hour into breathless minutes of watching, waiting and dreading... For the year is 1942, and this particular ship has lost its convoy. It travels alone like an aged blind thing groping through the unfriendly dark, stalked by unseen periscopes of steel killers. Yes, the Queen of Glasgow is a frightened ship, and she carries with her a premonition of - death.

== Plot ==
Carl Lanser is a passenger aboard the SS Queen of Glasgow, an isolated British cargo liner crossing the Atlantic in 1942, but has no idea of how he got aboard or who he is. Sitting with the captain and several passengers, Lanser dismisses fears of the ship being hunted by a U-boat "wolfpack", saying only one U-boat would be necessary and it would not bother using a torpedo on the ship. He is unable to explain how he knows any of this and recalls only that he was born in Frankfurt, but says he finds the ship, its crew and passengers oddly familiar. When called to the bridge by the captain, he cannot provide proof of his identity. Still confused, Lanser is sent back to his cabin with a steward, where he finds a Kriegsmarine officer's cap among his possessions with his name written on the inside.

The captain is forced to stop the ship for repairs when the overworked engines break down. Lanser becomes increasingly restless, haunted by an inescapable sense of impending doom. Convinced that everyone aboard the ship will die at 01:15, Lanser panics and runs through the passageways, attempting to raise an alarm. He finds the ship is mysteriously empty. When he finally locates some of the passengers, they silently stare at him as he implores them to abandon ship. At exactly 01:15, a searchlight illuminates the ship and a surfaced U-boat, commanded by Kapitänleutnant Carl Lanser, opens fire with its deck cannon and machine guns. The ship quickly sinks, leaving no survivors.

A bit later, Captain Lanser is at his cabin aboard his U-boat, recording that night's kill. His second-in-command, Lt. Mueller, is deeply troubled by what the U-boat crew has done, not warning the people on board the ship before firing upon them, and wonders "if we are not damned now". Lanser dismissively says he is sure the British Admiralty thinks so, but Mueller clarifies that he meant damned in the eyes of God. Despite Lanser's skepticism and sarcasm, Mueller grows more convinced that their crew could one day answer for their crime by reliving the act for all eternity.

Granted his own private hell as the man who ordered the massacre, Lanser reappears on the deck of the ship and the nightmare repeats itself.

== Closing narration ==
The SS Queen of Glasgow, heading for New York, and the time is 1942. For one man it is always 1942—and this man will ride the ghost ship every night for eternity. This is what is meant by paying the fiddler. This is the comeuppance awaiting every man when the ledger of his life is opened and examined, the tally made, and then the reward or the penalty paid. And in the case of Carl Lanser, former Kapitan Lieutenant, Navy of the Third Reich, this is the penalty. This is the justice meted out. This is judgment night in the Twilight Zone.

== Production ==
In the first 18 episodes, Serling only had one minor conflict with CBS regarding episode content. In an interview with Mike Wallace on September 22, 1959, Serling said, "We changed, in eighteen scripts, Mike, we have had one line changed, which, again, was a little ludicrous but of insufficient basic concern within the context of the story, not to put up a fight. On a bridge of a British ship, a sailor calls down to the galley and asks in my script for a pot of tea, because I believe that it's constitutionally acceptable in the British Navy to drink tea. One of my sponsors happens to sell instant coffee (Sanka), and he took great umbrage, or at least minor umbrage anyway, with the idea of saying tea. Well, we had a couple of swings back and forth, nothing serious, and we decided we'd ask for a tray to be sent up to the bridge. But in eighteen scripts, that's the only conflict we've had."

== Short story adaptation ==
The episode was adapted into a short story (by Walter B. Gibson) in the 1963 collection Rod Serling's Twilight Zone. The short story reveals how Lanser died, showing that his U-boat was sunk by a British destroyer after a crewman on the Queen of Glasgow radioed for assistance. It also adds a final scene, set 20 years after the episode, in which Barbara Stanley (revealed to have survived the sinking of the Queen of Glasgow by boarding a lifeboat) sees the ghosts of Carl Lanser and Lt. Mueller. Though Mueller is not forced to share in Lanser's punishment, he is doomed to witness it endlessly for doing nothing to save the Glasgow.

== See also ==
- "White Bear" – a Black Mirror episode with a similar plot and surprise ending
