= The Hunger and Other Stories =

Collection of short stories by Charles Beaumont

- First edition cover
- Author: Charles Beaumont
- Cover artist: Robert Clyne
- Language: English
- Genre: short stories
- Published: 1957 G. P. Putnam's Sons
- Publication place: United States
- Media type: Print (hardback & paperback)
- Pages: 234 pages

The Hunger and Other Stories is the first collection of short stories by American writer Charles Beaumont, published in April 1957. A British edition was published in 1964 under the title Shadow Play. In 2013 Valancourt Books released the first new edition in nearly 50 years.

== Stories collected ==
Title	Originally published in
"Miss Gentilbelle"	Previously unpublished
"The Vanishing American"	August 1955 issue of F&SF
"A Point of Honor" / "I'll Do Anything"	November 1955 issue of Manhunt
"Fair Lady"	Previously unpublished
"Free Dirt"	May 1955 issue of F&SF
"Open House"	Previously unpublished
"The Train"	Previously unpublished
"The Dark Music"	December 1956 issue of Playboy
"The Customers"	Previously unpublished
"Last Night in the Rain" / "Sin Tower"	October 1956 issue of Nugget
"The Crooked Man"	August 1955 issue of Playboy
"Nursery Rhyme"	Previously unpublished
"The Murderers"	February 1955 issue of Esquire
"The Hunger"	April 1955 issue of Playboy
"Tears of the Madonna"	Previously unpublished
"The Infernal Bouillabaisse"	Previously unpublished
"Black Country"	September 1954 issue of Playboy

== Reception ==
Anthony Boucher praised Beaumont for his portrayal of "an eery uncertain world of unexpected terrors and betrayals," although he faulted the story selection in The Hunger for including "a few items weak in either concept or execution"; Boucher concluded, however, that the volume included "enough wholly admirable stories to make the book worth every reader's while."
