= The Twilight Zone Companion =

1982 book by Marc Scott Zicree

- Author: Marc Scott Zicree
- Publication date: 1982
- ISBN: 9781879505094

The Twilight Zone Companion is a book by Marc Scott Zicree published in 1982.

== Contents ==
The Twilight Zone Companion is a book about the original The Twilight Zone series.

== Reception ==
Dave Pringle reviewed The Twilight Zone Companion for Imagine magazine, and stated that it "is excellent value for anyone who holds the 25-year-old TV series in high esteem. It is a well-illustrated 447-page book. The solid text contains interviews with many of the writers and directors who worked on the series, including Richard Matheson."

== Reviews ==
- Review by Robert Coulson (1983) in Amazing Science Fiction, May 1983
- Review by John DiPrete (1983) in Science Fiction Review, November 1983
