= Perchance to Dream (The Twilight Zone) =

- The Twilight Zone episode
- Episode no.: Season 1 Episode 9
- Directed by: Robert Florey
- Written by: Charles Beaumont
- Based on: "Perchance to Dream" by Charles Beaumont
- Production code: 173-3616
- Original air date: November 27, 1959

Guest appearances
- Richard Conte as Edward Hall; John Larch as Dr. Eliot Rathmann; Suzanne Lloyd as Maya/Miss Thomas

Episode chronology
← Previous "Time Enough at Last"	Next → "Judgment Night"
- The Twilight Zone (1959 TV series, season 1)

"Perchance to Dream" is the ninth episode of the American television anthology series The Twilight Zone. It originally aired on November 27, 1959, on CBS. The title of the episode and the Charles Beaumont short story that inspired it is taken from Hamlet's "To be, or not to be" speech.

== Opening narration ==
Twelve o'clock noon. An ordinary scene, an ordinary city. Lunchtime for thousands of ordinary people. To most of them, this hour will be a rest, a pleasant break in a day's routine. To most, but not all. To Edward Hall, time is an enemy, and the hour to come is a matter of life and death.

== Plot ==
Edward Hall seeks the aid of psychiatrist Dr. Eliot Rathmann. When he first enters the doctor's office, he is so tired he is barely able to stand; Rathmann helps him to the couch. Hall begins to drift into sleep, but suddenly jolts awake and gets up. When pressed by Rathmann, he explains he has a heart condition, and also believes that his overactive imagination is severely out of control, to the point where he's been able to see and feel something that is not there. Due to this, his heart condition is especially dangerous. He also explains that, when he has allowed himself to sleep he has been dreaming in chapters, as if in a movie serial. In his dreams, Maya "The Cat Girl", a taunting, laughing carnival dancer, first appears in his rear-view mirror as he drives, then at a carnival, lights his cigarette, kisses him, and lures him first into a funhouse and later onto a roller coaster in an attempt to frighten him.

He is now convinced that if he falls asleep, he'll die. On the other hand, keeping himself awake will put too much of a strain on his heart. Feeling that Rathmann cannot help him, Hall starts to leave, but stops when he sees that Rathmann's receptionist looks exactly like Maya. Terrified, he runs back into Rathmann's office and jumps out the window to his death.

In reality, the doctor calls his receptionist into his office, where Hall lies on the couch, his eyes closed. Rathmann tells the receptionist that Hall came in, lay down, immediately fell asleep, and then a few moments later let out a scream and died. "Well, I guess there are worse ways to go," the doctor says philosophically. "At least he died peacefully..."

== Closing narration ==
They say a dream takes only a second or so, and yet in that second a man can live a lifetime. He can suffer and die, and who's to say which is the greater reality: the one we know or the one in dreams, between heaven, the sky, the earth in - the Twilight Zone.

== Preview for next week's story ==
Once upon a time, there was a ship sailing from Liverpool, England to New York. It never got there and one man onboard knew why. Next week, we tell this man's story. The distinguished actor Nehemiah Persoff plays the role of Carl Lanser, a haunted man in a haunting story called "Judgment Night". This ship sails next week and we hope you'll see it off. Thank you and good night.

== Episode notes ==
- This was the first episode aired that was written by Charles Beaumont (and also the first that was not written by Rod Serling).
- "Throughout the TV filming, [director Robert] Florey strove for quality. It might have been the most expensive MGM feature. He rooted out the meanings of certain lines, frequently surprising me with symbols and shadings I'd neither planned nor suspected. The set was truly impressionistic, recalling the days of Caligari and Liliom. The costumes were generally perfect. And in the starring role, Richard Conte gave a performance which displays both intensity and subtlety." ―Charles Beaumont writing in The Magazine of Fantasy & Science Fiction, December 1959.
- This is one of several episodes from season one to have its opening title sequence plastered over with the opening for season two. This was done during the Summer of 1961 in order to give the re-running episodes of season one the new look that the show would take in the upcoming second season.
- In an unfortunate occurrence of life imitating art, on April 3, 1975, Conte suffered a massive heart attack. He was put in intensive care and died on April 15.

== Radio drama ==
The episode was adapted for radio in 2002 featuring Fred Willard as Edward Hall. It was then released as part of The Twilight Zone Radio Dramas – Volume 9 collection.
