= John Tomerlin =

American novelist and screenwriter (1930–2014)

John Tomerlin (March 26, 1930 – November 25, 2014) was an American novelist and screenwriter.

== Major works ==
Tomerlin's first science-fiction story was Alienation of Affection, published in Science Fantasy magazine in February 1957. Under the joint pseudonym "Keith Grantland", he wrote the novel Run from the Hunter (1957) with Charles Beaumont. His sole science-fiction novel, The High Tower, was published in 1980.

== Television and film ==
He adapted Beaumont's short story The Beautiful People as the episode "Number 12 Looks Just Like You" for The Twilight Zone television series. Though Tomerlin alone adapted the ailing Beaumont's story, he was given secondary credit.

Other series he wrote for include Thriller and Richard Diamond, Private Detective.

He provided the screenplay for a 1973 made-for-television version of Oscar Wilde's novel The Picture of Dorian Gray.
