= The Howling Man =

- The Twilight Zone episode
- Episode no.: Season 2 Episode 5
- Directed by: Douglas Heyes
- Written by: Charles Beaumont
- Based on: "The Howling Man" by Charles Beaumont
- Production code: 173-3642
- Original air date: November 4, 1960

Guest appearances
- H.M. Wynant as David Ellington; John Carradine as Brother Jerome; Robin Hughes as The Howling Man; Frederic Ledebur as Brother Christopherus; Ezelle Poule as Housekeeper

Episode chronology
← Previous "A Thing About Machines"	Next → "Eye of the Beholder"
- The Twilight Zone (1959 TV series, season 2)

"The Howling Man" is episode 41 of the American television anthology series The Twilight Zone. It originally aired on November 4, 1960 on CBS. The episode was based on the short story by Charles Beaumont published in the November 1959 issue of Rogue magazine.

== Opening narration ==
The prostrate form of Mr. David Ellington, scholar, seeker of truth and, regrettably, finder of truth. A man who will shortly arise from his exhaustion to confront a problem that has tormented mankind since the beginning of time. A man who knocked on a door seeking sanctuary and found, instead, the outer edges of The Twilight Zone.

== Plot ==
While on a walking trip through post–World War I Central Europe circa 1919, David Ellington becomes lost in a storm. He sees an ancient castle, now the home of a monastic order. He knocks at the door and pleads for help. He is told by the monk who opens the door that they do not allow visitors. After Ellington further begs, the monk goes to speak to a person he names as Brother Jerome, while Ellington waits and hears a wolf-like howl coming from inside the castle. The monk returns and, when asked about the howling, says it is merely the wind. The monk takes Ellington to meet Brother Jerome, the leader of the order. After Ellington explains himself, Brother Jerome announces that there is no help to be had there and that Ellington must leave. Bewildered, Ellington walks out and collapses in the hallway.

When Ellington awakens, he again hears howling. He investigates and finds a man in a cell. The man claims to be unjustly imprisoned by the "mad" monks, and beaten by Brother Jerome using the staff he carries. Ellington is seen talking to the prisoner and is taken back to Brother Jerome. Ellington agrees to leave but also threatens to go to the police. Brother Jerome, disturbed by Ellington's threat, then reveals the truth: the prisoner is the Devil himself, and can only be contained by Brother Jerome's "Staff of Truth". The Devil had come to the village shortly after World War I to corrupt it, but Brother Jerome used the staff to imprison him. These actions have given the world five years of relative peace. Ellington pretends to believe the story; Brother Jerome is not fooled and assigns a brother to watch him.

Ellington waits until his guard falls asleep, then creeps down to the cell and sees that the door is held shut only by a staff that is within reach of the imprisoned man. At the man's urging, Ellington removes the staff. The prisoner exits the cell and pins Ellington to the floor with a wave of his hand. As he walks toward the exit, he begins to change, taking on the appearance of the Devil, before departing the castle in a plume of smoke. Brother Jerome arrives, and sadly explains that the inability to recognize the Devil has always been Man's great weakness.

Ellington has been telling his story to a maid. He says that ever since then he has been hunting for the Devil to atone for his mistake, through World War II, the Korean War, and the development of nuclear weapons. He has finally succeeded, locking the Devil in a closet barred by a staff similar to Brother Jerome's. Ellington intends to return him to the castle; he warns the skeptical housekeeper to not remove the staff under any circumstances. As soon as Ellington leaves, the maid hears a howl from behind the door, removes the staff, and opens the door.

== Closing narration ==
Ancient folk saying: "You can catch the Devil, but you can't hold him long." Ask Brother Jerome. Ask David Ellington. They know, and they'll go on knowing to the end of their days and beyond — in the Twilight Zone.

== Cast ==
- H.M. Wynant as David Ellington
- John Carradine as Brother Jerome
- Robin Hughes as The Howling Man
- Frederic Ledebur as Brother Christophorus
- Ezelle Poule as Housekeeper

== Production ==
This was the first aired episode of the second season that was not written by Rod Serling.

Charles Beaumont had originally envisioned that the monks would keep the Devil imprisoned by putting a cross in front of his cell door. Fearful of a backlash in the religious community, the producers substituted the "staff of truth" over Beaumont's objections.

== See also ==
- List of Twilight Zone (1959 TV series) episodes
