= Jerry Sohl =

American scriptwriter and author

Gerald Allan Sohl Sr. (December 2, 1913 – November 4, 2002) was an American television scriptwriter and science fiction author who wrote for The Twilight Zone (as a ghostwriter for Charles Beaumont), Alfred Hitchcock Presents, The Outer Limits, Star Trek: The Original Series (once using the pseudonym "Nathan Butler"), and other shows. He wrote more than twenty novels as well as feature film scripts. He also wrote the nonfiction works Underhanded Chess and Underhanded Bridge in 1973.

== Novels ==
New York Times reviewer Villiers Gerson described his 1953 novel The Transcendent Man as "contain[ing] enough twists to afford the reader a few hours' entertainment" despite being "oversimplified in motivation." P. Schuyler Miller found the plot unconvincing. Gerson later panned Sohl's The Altered Ego, saying "This wordy book lacks characterization, emotion, suspense, and interest."

His 1955 Point Ultimate is a piece of Cold War invasion literature: in 1999, a faraway future history at the time of writing, the US lies under a cruel Soviet occupation, reinforced by a deadly artificial disease which makes conquered Americans dependent on the conquerors for the injections that keep them alive.

In The Time Dissolver (1957), a man and a woman wake one morning to find that they have lost all memory of the past eleven years, including how they met and became married.

== Ghostwriting ==
As Charles Beaumont became increasingly ill from a mysterious brain illness, possibly Pick's disease or very early onset Alzheimer's, and unable to write, Sohl ghostwrote three episodes of The Twilight Zone for him. These were "The New Exhibit", "Queen of the Nile" and "Living Doll". Beaumont insisted on splitting the fees for each episode.

== Bibliography ==
=== Novels ===
- The Haploids (1952)
- The Transcendent Man (1953)
- Costigan's Needle (1953)
- The Altered Ego (1954)
- Point Ultimate (1955)
- The Mars Monopoly (1956)
- The Time Dissolver (1957)
- Prelude to Peril (1957)
- One Against Herculum (1959)
- The Odious Ones (1959)
- Night Slaves (1965)
- The Lemon Eaters (1967)
- The Anomaly (1971)
- The Spun Sugar Hole (1971)
- Dr. Josh (1973; as by Nathan Butler)
- The Resurrection of Frank Borchard (1973)
- Mamelle (1974; as by Nathan Butler)
- SuperManChu, Master of Kung Fu (1974; as by Sean Mei Sullivan)
- Blow-Dry (1976; as by Nathan Butler)
- I, Aleppo (1976)
- Mamelle, The Goddess (1977; as by Nathan Butler)
- Death Sleep (1983)
- Kaheesh (1983; as by Nathan Butler)
- Night Wind (1983; as by Roberta Jean Mountjoy)
- Black Thunder (1983; as by Roberta Jean Mountjoy)

=== Non-fiction ===
- Underhanded Chess (1973)
- Underhanded Bridge (1973)

== Filmography ==
=== Films ===
Year	Film	Credit	Notes
1960	Twelve Hours to Kill	Screenplay By	
1965	Frankenstein Conquers the World		
1965	Monster of Terror	Screenplay By	
1968	The Crimson Cult	Story by	
1970	Night Slaves	Story By	Based on his novel of the same name.

=== Television ===
Year	TV Series	Credit	Notes
1959	M Squad	Writer	1 Episode
1959–61	Alfred Hitchcock Presents	Writer	4 Episodes
1960	General Electric Theater	Writer	1 Episode
1961	Route 66	Writer	1 Episode
1962	Target: The Corruptors!	Writer	1 Episode
1963–64	The Twilight Zone	Writer (Uncredited)	3 Episodes
1964	The Outer Limits	Writer	2 Episodes
1966–69	Star Trek	Writer	3 Episodes
1967	The Invaders	Writer	2 Episodes
1977	Man from Atlantis	Writer	1 Episode
1978	The Next Step Beyond	Writer	1 Episode
