= Charles Beaumont =

American author (1929–1967)

- Beaumont c. 1960s
- Born: Charles Leroy Nutt; January 2, 1929; Chicago, Illinois, U.S.
- Died: February 21, 1967 (aged 38); Los Angeles, California, U.S.
- Spouse: Helen Broun
- Children: 4
- Writing career
- Period: 1950–1967
- Genres: Speculative fiction; science fiction; horror
- Notable work: The Twilight Zone

Charles Beaumont (born Charles Leroy Nutt; January 2, 1929 – February 21, 1967) was an American author of speculative fiction, including short stories in the horror and science fiction subgenres. He is remembered as a writer of classic Twilight Zone episodes, such as "The Howling Man", "Static", "A Nice Place to Visit", "Miniature", "Printer's Devil", and "Number Twelve Looks Just Like You", but also penned the screenplays for several films, such as 7 Faces of Dr. Lao, The Intruder (based on his novel), and The Masque of the Red Death.

Novelist Dean Koontz said "Charles Beaumont was one of the seminal influences on writers of the fantastic and macabre."

== Early life ==
Beaumont was born Charles Leroy Nutt in Chicago, Illinois, on January 2, 1929, the son of Charles Hiram Nutt and Violet (Phillips) Nutt. After a bout spinal meningitis at the age of twelve, Beaumont was sent to live with his aunts in Everett, Washington. He left high school a semester shy of graduation and joined the United States Army, later studying at the Bliss-Hayden Acting School under the G.I. Bill.

Beaumont met his future wife Helen Broun in 1948; they married shortly after and raised four children together.

== Career ==
After starring in his first Bliss-Hayden production as Charles Beaumont—his new legal name—Beaumont was signed by Universal Pictures as an actor. He left Universal after his first film's production was aborted, turning to commercial art and later writing. Beaumont had been an avid reader of pulp fiction as a youth, and sold his first story to the pulp magazine Amazing Stories in 1950. After losing his job as a machinist in 1953, he began to write full time. In 1954, Playboy featured Beaumont's "Black Country" as its first published piece of short fiction, and after Beaumont also started writing for television and film.

Beaumont was energetic and spontaneous, and was known to take trips (sometimes out of the country) at a moment's notice. An avid racing fan, he often enjoyed participating in or watching area speedway races, with other authors tagging along. Beaumont and several friends built their own SCCA H Modified racecar dubbed the "Monzetta", consisting of Panhard mechanicals and a Devin body and chassis, which was raced at many Southern California tracks including Paramount Ranch Racetrack.

His cautionary fables include "The Beautiful People" (1952), about a rebellious adolescent girl in a future conformist society in which people are obligated to alter their physical appearance (adapted with friend and frequent writing partner John Tomerlin as an episode of Twilight Zone, "Number 12 Looks Just Like You"), and "Free Dirt" (1955), about a man who gorges on his entire vegetable harvest and dies from having consumed the magical soil he used to grow it.

His short story "The Crooked Man" (also published by Playboy in 1955) presents a dystopian future wherein heterosexuality is stigmatized in the same way that homosexuality then was, with heterosexual people living furtively like pre-Stonewall gay and lesbian people. In the story, a heterosexual man meets his lover in a gay orgy bar; they try to have sex in a curtained booth (she dressed in male drag) and are caught.

Beaumont wrote several scripts for The Twilight Zone, including an adaptation of his own short story, "The Howling Man", about a prisoner who might be the Devil, and the hour-long "Valley of the Shadow", about a cloistered Utopia that refuses to share its startlingly advanced technology with the outside world.

Beaumont scripted the film Queen of Outer Space from an outline by Ben Hecht, deliberately writing the screenplay as a parody. According to Beaumont, the directorial style is not informed by his satiric intent. He penned one episode of the TV show Steve Canyon, titled "Operation B-52", in which Canyon and his crew attempt to set a speed record in a B-52 accompanied by a newsman who hates Air Force pilots.

Beaumont was much admired by his colleagues (Ray Bradbury, Harlan Ellison, Richard Matheson, Robert Bloch, Roger Corman). Many of his stories have been re-released in the posthumous volumes Best of Beaumont (Bantam, 1982) and The Howling Man (Tom Doherty, 1992), and a set of previously unpublished tales, A Touch of the Creature (Subterranean Press, 1999). In 2004, Gauntlet Press released the first of two volumes collecting Beaumont's Twilight Zone scripts.

Beaumont wrote several scripts for Roger Corman including The Intruder. According to Filmink, "In Corman-ology, Beaumont’s often confused for Richard Matheson."

== Illness and death ==
In 1963, when Beaumont was 34 and overwhelmed by numerous writing commitments, he began to suffer the effects of "a mysterious brain disease" which seemed to age him rapidly. His ability to speak, concentrate, and remember became erratic. While some people attributed all of this to Beaumont's heavy drinking, his friend and colleague John Tomerlin disagreed: "I was working closely with Chuck at the time, and we were good enough friends for me to know that alcohol by itself could not possibly account for the odd state of mind that he was in."

"He was rarely well," his friend and colleague William F. Nolan later recalled. "He was thin, and kept having headaches. He used Bromo-Seltzer like most people use water. He had a big Bromo bottle with him all the time". The disease also affected his work. "He could barely sell stories, much less write. He would go unshaven to meetings with producers, which would end in disaster. [A script writer has] got to be able to think on your feet, which Chuck couldn't do anymore; and so the producers would just go, 'We're sorry, Mr. Beaumont, but we don't like the script'."

The condition might have been related to the spinal meningitis he suffered as a child. His friend and early agent Forrest J. Ackerman has asserted an alternative, that Beaumont suffered simultaneously from Alzheimer's disease and Pick's disease. This claim was supported by the UCLA Medical Staff, who subjected Beaumont to a battery of tests in the summer of 1964 that indicated that it might be either Alzheimer's or Pick's. Nolan recalls that the UCLA doctors sent Beaumont home with a death sentence: "They said 'There's absolutely no treatment for this disease. It's permanent and it's terminal. He'll probably live from six months to three years with it. He'll decline and get to where he can't stand up. He won't feel any pain. In fact, he won't even know this is happening'." In Nolan's own words: "Like his character 'Walter Jameson,' Chuck just dusted away".

Several fellow writers, including Nolan and friend Jerry Sohl, began ghostwriting for Beaumont during 1963–1964, so that he could meet his many writing obligations. Privately, he insisted on splitting these fees. By 1965, however, Beaumont was too ill to even create or sell story ideas. His last on-screen writing credit during his lifetime was for the 1965 film Mister Moses, officially a screenplay written with (but more likely written by) Monja Danischewsky.

On February 21, 1967, Beaumont died in Woodland Hills, California at the age of 38. His son Christopher later said that his father, "[...]looked ninety-five and was, in fact, ninety-five by every calendar except the one on your watch".

== Bibliography ==
=== Twilight Zone credits ===
The following is a list of episodes Beaumont penned for The Twilight Zone (an asterisk indicates that the episode was credited to Beaumont, but ghostwritten by Jerry Sohl).

- "Perchance to Dream"
- "Elegy"
- "Long Live Walter Jameson"
- "A Nice Place to Visit"
- "The Howling Man"
- "Static" (story by OCee Ritch)
- "The Prime Mover" (story by George Clayton Johnson)
- "Long Distance Call" (co-written with Bill Idelson)
- "Shadow Play"
- "The Jungle"
- "Dead Man's Shoes" (story only; ghostwritten by OCee Ritch)
- "The Fugitive"
- "Person or Persons Unknown"
- "In His Image"
- "Valley of the Shadow"
- "Miniature"
- "Printer's Devil"
- "The New Exhibit" *
- "Passage on the Lady Anne"
- "Living Doll" *
- "Number 12 Looks Just Like You" (co-written with John Tomerlin)
- "Queen of the Nile" *

=== Short stories ===
- "The Devil, You Say?" (Jan 1951, Amazing Stories, adapted for Twilight Zone)
- "The Beautiful People" (Sep 1952, If, adapted for Twilight Zone)
- "Fritzchen" (1953, Orbit #1)
- "Place of Meeting" (1953, Orbit #2)
- "Elegy" (Feb 1953, Imagination, adapted for Twilight Zone)
- "The Last Caper" (Mar 1954, F&SF)
- "Keeper of the Dream" (1954, Time to Come)
- "Mass for Mixed Voices" (May 1954, Science Fiction Quarterly)
- "Hair of the Dog" (Jul 1954, Orbit #3)
- "The Quadriopticon" (Aug 1954, F&SF)
- "Black Country" (Sep 1954, Playboy)
- "The Jungle" (Dec 1954, If, adapted for Twilight Zone)
- "The Murderers" (Feb 1955, Esquire)
- "The Hunger" (Apr 1955, Playboy)
- "The Last Word" (with Chad Oliver, Apr 1955, F&SF)
- "Free Dirt" (May 1955, F&SF, adapted for The Twilight Zone as a radio drama)
- "The New Sound" (Jun 1955, F&SF)
- "The Crooked Man" (Aug 1955, Playboy)
- "The Vanishing American" (Aug 1955, F&SF)
- "Last Rites" (Oct 1955, If)
- "A Point of Honor" / "I'll Do Anything" (Nov 1955, Manhunt)
- "A Classic Affair" (Dec 1955, Playboy)
- "Traumerei" (Feb 1956, Infinity Science Fiction)
- "The Monster Show" (May 1956, Playboy)
- "The Guests of Chance" (with Chad Oliver, Jun 1956, Infinity Science Fiction)
- "You Can't Have Them All" (Aug 1956, Playboy)
- "Last Night in the Rain" / "Sin Tower" (Oct 1956, Nugget)
- "The Dark Music" (Dec 1956, Playboy)
- "Oh Father of Mine" / "Father, Dear Father" (Jan 1957, Venture)
- "The Love-Master" (Feb 1957, Rogue)
- "The Man Who Made Himself" / "In His Image" (Feb 1957, Imagination, adapted for Twilight Zone)
- "Night Ride" (Mar 1957, Playboy)
- "The Customers" (Apr 1957, The Hunger and Other Stories)
- "Fair Lady" (Apr 1957, The Hunger and Other Stories)
- "The Infernal Bouillabaisse" (Apr 1957, The Hunger and Other Stories)
- "Miss Gentilbelle" (Apr 1957, The Hunger and Other Stories)
- "Nursery Rhyme" (Apr 1957, The Hunger and Other Stories)
- "Open House" (Apr 1957, The Hunger and Other Stories)
- "Tears of the Madonna" (Apr 1957, The Hunger and Other Stories)
- "The Train" (Apr 1957, The Hunger and Other Stories)
- "A Death in the Country" / "The Deadly Will Win" (Nov 1957, Playboy)
- "Anthem" (Apr 1958, Yonder)
- "Mother's Day" (Apr 1958, Yonder)
- "A World of Differents" (Apr 1958, Yonder)
- "The New People" (Aug 1958, Rogue)
- "Perchance to Dream" (Oct 1958, Playboy, adapted for Twilight Zone)
- "The Intruder" (1959, excerpt of chapter ten of the novel)
- "The Music of the Yellow Brass" (Jan 1959, Playboy)
- "The Trigger" (Jan 1959, Mystery Digest)
- "Sorcerer's Moon" (Jul 1959, Playboy)
- "The Howling Man" (Nov 1959, Rogue, adapted for Twilight Zone)
- "Buck Fever" (Mar 1960, Night Ride and Other Journeys)
- "The Magic Man" (Mar 1960, Night Ride and Other Journeys)
- "The Neighbors" (Mar 1960, Night Ride and Other Journeys)
- "Song For a Lady" (Mar 1960, Night Ride and Other Journeys, adapted for Twilight Zone)
- "Gentlemen, Be Seated" (Apr 1960, Rogue, adapted for The Twilight Zone as a radio drama)
- "Three Thirds of a Ghost" / "The Baron's Secret" (Aug 1960, Nugget)
- "Blood Brother" (Apr 1961, Playboy)
- "Mourning Song" (1963, Gamma #1)
- "Something in the Earth" (1963, Gamma #2)
- "Auto Suggestion" (1965, Gamma #5)
- "Insomnia Vobiscum" (1982, Best of Beaumont)
- "My Grandmother's Japonicas" (1984, Masques #1)
- "Appointment with Eddie" (1987, The Howling Man)
- "The Carnival" (1987, The Howling Man)
- "The Crime of Willie Washington" (1987, The Howling Man)
- "The Man with the Crooked Nose" (1987, The Howling Man)
- "To Hell with Claude" (with Chad Oliver, 1987, The Howling Man)
- "The Wages of Cynicism" (1999)
- "Adam's Off Ox" (2000, A Touch of the Creature)
- "Fallen Star" (2000, A Touch of the Creature)
- "A Friend of the Family" (2000, A Touch of the Creature)
- "The Indian Piper" (2000, A Touch of the Creature)
- "The Junemoon Spoon" (2000, A Touch of the Creature)
- "Lachrymosa" (2000, A Touch of the Creature)
- "A Long Way from Capri" (2000, A Touch of the Creature)
- "Moon in Gemini" (2000, A Touch of the Creature)
- "Mr. Underhill" (2000, A Touch of the Creature)
- "The Pool" (2000, A Touch of the Creature)
- "Resurrection Island" (2000, A Touch of the Creature)
- "The Rival" (2000, A Touch of the Creature)
- "Time and Again" (2000, A Touch of the Creature)
- "With the Family" (2000, A Touch of the Creature)
- "I, Claude" (with Chad Oliver)
- "The Rest of Science Fiction" (with Chad Oliver)

=== Short story collections ===
==== Collections published during Beaumont's lifetime ====
- The Hunger and Other Stories (Apr 1957; UK title Shadow Play)
- Yonder (Apr 1958)
- Night Ride and Other Journeys (Mar 1960)
- The Magic Man (1965) (containing nine stories from The Hunger, three from Yonder and six from Night Ride)
- The Edge (1966) (containing three stories from Yonder and eight from Night Ride)

==== Collections published posthumously ====
- Best of Beaumont (Nov 1982) (featuring selected from previous collections and four not previously collected)
- Selected Stories (1988) (reprinted as The Howling Man, 1992) (featuring stories from previous collection and eight previously uncollected stories)
- A Touch of the Creature (2000) (fourteen previously unpublished/unfinished stories)
- Mass for Mixed Voices (2013) (expanded version of Selected Stories with two previously unpublished stories ["Life of the Party" and "The Child"], a new introduction, and three new story prefaces)
- Perchance to Dream (2015)
- The Carnival and Other Stories (2022)

=== Film ===
- Tradita (1954)
- Queen of Outer Space (1958)
- Ursula (1961, based on Beaumont's short story "Miss Gentilbelle")
- Night of the Eagle (1962) U.S. title Burn, Witch, Burn! (screenplay co-written with Richard Matheson and George Baxt based on Conjure Wife by Fritz Leiber)
- Premature Burial (1962) (based on "The Premature Burial" by Edgar Allan Poe)
- The Wonderful World of the Brothers Grimm (1962)
- The Intruder (1962, based on Beaumont's novel. Also acted in a supporting role.)
- The Haunted Palace (1963) (based on the short novel The Case of Charles Dexter Ward by H.P. Lovecraft)
- 7 Faces of Dr. Lao (1964) (based on the short novel The Circus of Dr. Lao by Charles G. Finney)
- The Masque of the Red Death (1964) (based on eponymous short story by Edgar Allan Poe)
- Mister Moses (1965)
- Journey Into Darkness (1968, based on Beaumont's short story "The New People")
- Brain Dead (1990) (produced posthumously, from his screenplay)
- Miss Gentilbelle (2000) (produced posthumously)

=== Novel ===
- Run from the Hunter (1957, as Keith Grantland, co-authored by John Tomerlin)
- The Intruder (1959)

=== Nonfiction ===
- Remember? Remember? (1956, essays on American pop culture between the world wars)
- Omnibus of Speed: An Introduction to the World of Motorsport (1958, with William F. Nolan)

=== Comics ===
- Li'l Bad Wolf (untitled story) Walt Disney's Comics and Stories #170 (1954)
- "A Soft Life" Woody Woodpecker #29 (1955)
- "Why Birds Leave Home" Tweety and Sylvester #8 (1955)
- "The Mystery of Whalers' Cove" Mickey Mouse #43 (1955)
- "The Adventure of the Silver Parrot" Mickey Mouse #45 (1955/56)
- "The Mardi Gras Mystery" Mickey Mouse #46 (1956)
- "The Mystery of Diamond Mountain" Mickey Mouse #47 (1956)
- "The Mammoth Adventure" Mickey Mouse #48 (1956)
- "The Case of the Vanishing Bandit" Mickey Mouse #48 (1956)
- "The Giant Pearls of Agoo Island" Mickey Mouse #49 (1956)
- "Trouble Cooking" Mickey Mouse #51 (1956–7)

=== Note ===
Beaumont co-wrote the stories with William F. Nolan.
