= Stafford Repp =

American actor (1918–1974)

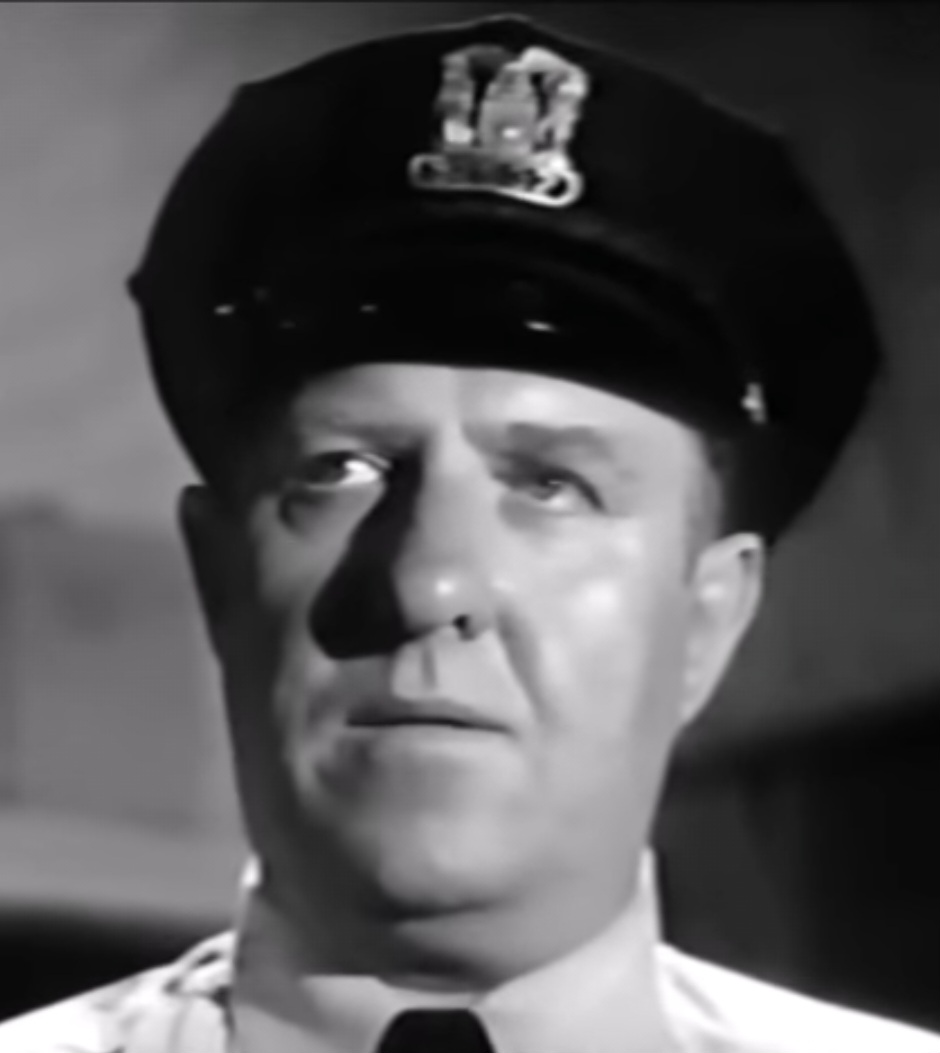
- Repp in an episode of One Step Beyond (1959)
- Born: Stafford Alois Repp; April 26, 1918; San Francisco, California, U.S.
- Died: November 5, 1974 (aged 56); Inglewood, California, U.S.
- Resting place: Westminster Memorial Park, Westminster, California
- Occupation: Actor
- Years active: c. 1943–1974
- Children: 5

Stafford Alois Repp (April 26, 1918 – November 5, 1974) was an American character actor best known for his role as Police Chief Miles Clancy O'Hara on ABC's Batman television series (1966-68).

== World War II ==
Soon after the December 7, 1941 attack on Pearl Harbor, he served a stint in the United States Army Air Corps during World War II. He was active in performing in and producing shows while he was in the Army Air Corps. After his military service, he began his acting career.

== Acting career ==
Repp acted in stage productions on the West Coast before World War II.

At the beginning of his film career, Repp appeared in numerous film and TV productions including the films I Want to Live! (1958) with Susan Hayward, and The Brothers Karamazov, both made in 1958. Also at this same time he began to appear in a string of early television programs from the middle 1950s to the early 1960s, including NBC's western anthology series Frontier and the Barry Sullivan/Clu Gulager western, The Tall Man.

Repp appeared on Rod Cameron's State Trooper, Barbara Eden's How to Marry a Millionaire, Peter Lawford's The Thin Man (1957), Tom Tryon's Texas John Slaughter (1958), Rex Allen's Frontier Doctor (1959), Rawhide (1959), Howard Duff's Dante (1961), Walter Brennan's The Real McCoys (1957 and 1959), Gunsmoke (1957, 1960 & 1965), The Donna Reed Show (1960), Guestward, Ho! (1960), Angel (1961), and Dennis the Menace (1962 and 1963). He appeared as Joe Melvin, a plumber, in a 1963 episode of The Lucy Show, "Lucy and Viv Put in a Shower".

Repp made four appearances on Perry Mason between 1959 and 1962 in minor roles, including Private Investigator Phillip Morgan in "The Case of the Petulant Partner."

From 1963 to 1964, he portrayed Brink, the factory supervisor on Phil Silvers' The New Phil Silvers Show. His series co-stars were Buddy Lester, Herbie Faye, Elena Verdugo, Ronnie Dapo, and Sandy Descher.

Repp made appearances in The Twilight Zone episodes "Nick of Time" which starred William Shatner; a supporting role in "The Grave" with a cast which consisted of Lee Marvin, Lee Van Cleef, Strother Martin, James Best, and Elen Willard; then finally in "Caesar and Me."

In early 1966, he appeared as a railroad detective in an episode in the last season of My Favorite Martian.

In 1966, he started his stint as Chief O'Hara on Batman. While on Batman, he appeared as a guest in numerous other television programs, including Love American Style, I Dream of Jeannie and The Mothers-in-Law, in the latter once again playing a policeman.

His last released film was Linda Lovelace for President in 1975. He had a posthumous appearance in Mannix that was first broadcast two months after his death. His last television appearance was on the TV show M*A*S*H (as a Military Police Officer) that was first broadcast four months after his death. Shortly before his death in 1974, he filmed several scenes for Orson Welles' unfinished film The Other Side of the Wind, which was not completed and released until 2018.

== Personal life ==
Repp was married and had five children.

Repp died of a heart attack at age 56 on November 5, 1974, while at Hollywood Park Racetrack in Inglewood, California. He is interred at Westminster Memorial Park in Westminster, California. After his death, his sister, a television writer, established the Stafford Repp Memorial Scholarship for alumni of his alma mater, Lowell High School.

== Selected TV and filmography ==
- Fireman Save My Child (1954) - Emma's Third Coachman (uncredited)
- Shield for Murder (1954) - Detective O'Dell (uncredited)
- Down Three Dark Streets (1954) - Boxing Manager (uncredited)
- Black Tuesday (1954) - Bert Posmonick (uncredited)
- Unchained (1955) - Mr. Miller, Prison Welding Supervisor (uncredited)
- Big House, U.S.A. (1955) - Prison Warden Machek (uncredited)
- Strange Lady in Town (1955) - Macaneer (uncredited)
- The Shrike (1955) - Fleming (uncredited)
- Not as a Stranger (1955) - Orientation Doctor (uncredited)
- Man with the Gun (1955) - Arthur Jackson (uncredited)
- The Killer Is Loose (1956) - State Police Capt. Lyle Snow (uncredited)
- The Steel Jungle (1956) - Beakeley
- The Price of Fear (1956) - Johnny McNab
- The Harder They Fall (1956) - Reporter (uncredited)
- Star in the Dust (1956) - Leo Roos
- Canyon River (1956) - Bartender (uncredited)
- The Boss (1956) - Earl Bentley (uncredited)
- Plunder Road (1957) - Roly Adams
- Gunsmoke (1957, Episode: "Moon") - Charlie Brewer
- The Green-Eyed Blonde (1957) - Bill Prell (uncredited)
- Official Detective (1958, Episode: "Hijackers") - Hank Coles
- The Walter Winchell File (1958, Episode: "David & Goliath") - Benny Getzler
- The Brothers Karamazov (1958) - Innkeeper (uncredited)
- Broken Arrow (1958, Episode: "Panic") - Storekeeper
- Hot Spell (1958) - Baggage Man (uncredited)
- The Silent Service (1958, Episode: "The Growler's Captain") - Chief of Boat Willie Wiles
- As Young as We Are (1958) - John (uncredited)
- I Want to Live! (1958) - Police Sgt.
- The Californians (1958, Episode: "Gentleman from Philadelphia") - Boggs
- The Californians (1958, Episode: "Golden Grapes") - Jenkins
- Gunsmoke (1958, Episode: "Texas Cowboys") - Mr. Hightower
- The Californians (1959, Episode: "Stampede at Misery Flats") - Amos Dayton
- The Crimson Kimono (1959) - City Librarian (uncredited)
- Rawhide (1959, Episode: "Incident with an Executioner") - Vanryzin
- Hennesey (1959, Episode: "Shore Patrol") - Dennis
- Richard Diamond, Private Detective (1960, Episode "The Popskull") - Charley London
- Rawhide (1960, Episode: "Incident of the Sharpshooter") - Mayor Watkins
- The DuPont Show with June Allyson in "The Way Home" (CBS-TV, 1960) - Jesse
- Hennesey (1960, Episode: "The Underfed Fullback") - Marine
- The Twilight Zone (1960, Episode: "Nick of Time") - Mechanic
- Gunsmoke (1960, Episode: "The Peace Officer") - Styles
- Bonanza (1960-1961, three episodes) - Mine Owner / Sheriff Brady / Carter
- Rawhide (1961) – Matt Walters in S3:E13, "Incident Near the Promised Land"
- Hennesey (1961, Episode: "Shore Patrol Revisited") - Dennis
- The Explosive Generation (1961) - Police Captain
- The Twilight Zone (1961, Episode: "The Grave") - Ira Broadly
- Our Man Higgins (1962, in the episode, "The Rules of the Road") - Buckmaster
- The Lucy Show (1963), Joe Melvin in the episode "Lucy and Viv Put in a Shower"
- The New Phil Silvers Show (1963-1964) - Brink (17 episodes)
- A Tiger Walks (1964) - Mr. Blonden, City Editor (uncredited)
- The Twilight Zone (1964, Episode: "Caesar and Me") - Pawnbroker
- The Lucy Show (1964), Counterman in the episode "Lucy Is a Process Server"
- A Very Special Favor (1965) - Bartender
- Gunsmoke (1965, Episode: "Twenty Miles from Dodge") - Otie Schaffer
- Batman (1966–1968, TV Series) - Chief O'Hara
- Batman (1966) - Chief O'Hara
- Love, American Style (1969) - Superintendent
- Gunsmoke (1972, Episode: "Hostage!") - Sheriff Tanner
- Cycle Psycho (1973)
- Linda Lovelace for President (1975) - Dirty Old Man (Released Posthumously)
- The Other Side of the Wind (2018) - Al Denny (Released Posthumously; Stock Footage)
