= The Great Gabbo =

1929 film directed by James Cruze

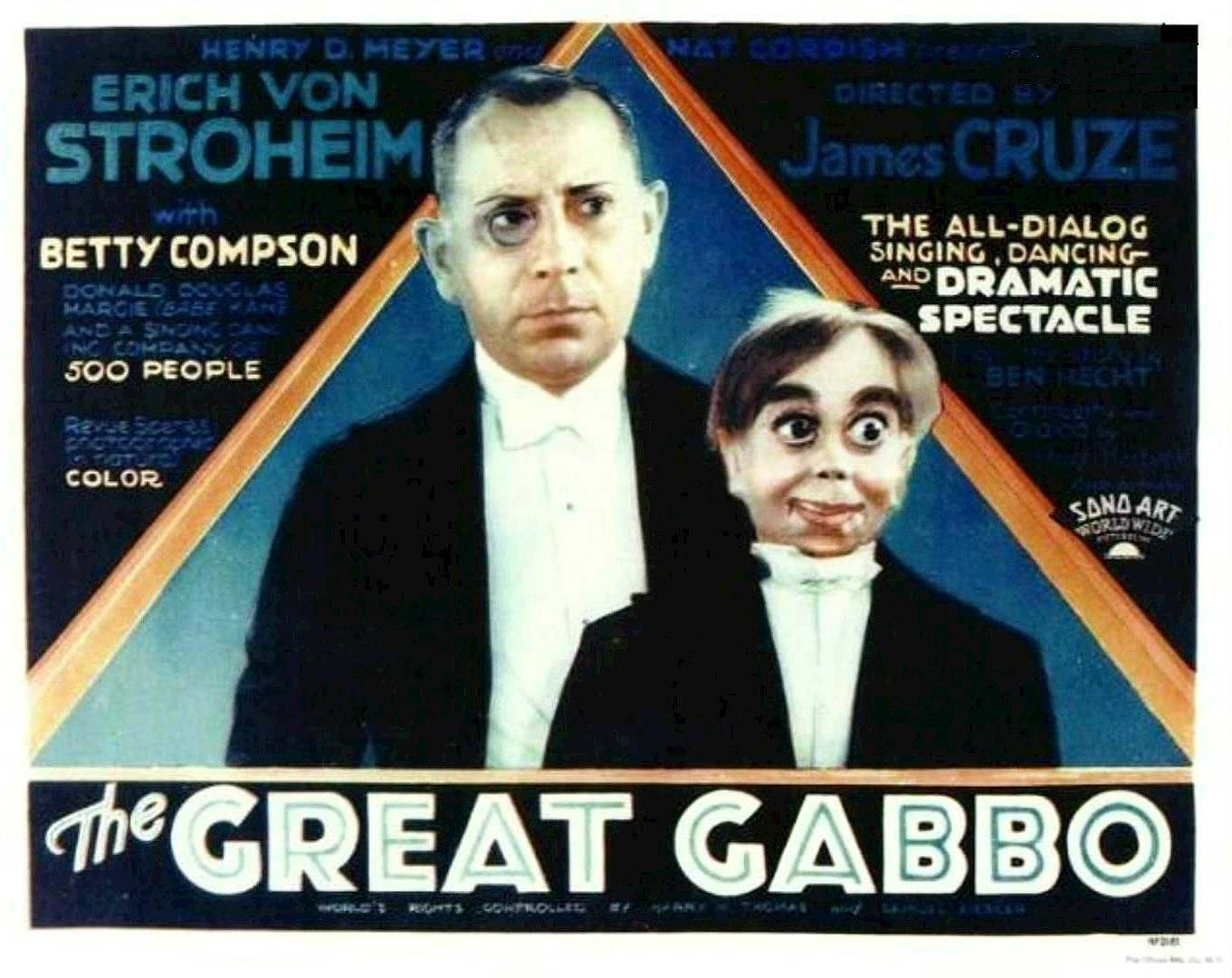
- Lobby card
- Directed by: James Cruze; Uncredited: Erich von Stroheim
- Screenplay by: Hugh Herbert
- Based on: "The Rival Dummy" by Ben Hecht
- Produced by: James Cruze
- Starring: Erich von Stroheim; Betty Compson
- Cinematography: Ira H. Morgan
- Music by: Howard Jackson
- Production company: James Cruze Productions
- Distributed by: Sono Art-World Wide Pictures
- Release date: September 12, 1929
- Running time: 94 minutes
- Country: United States
- Languages: English; German

The Great Gabbo is a 1929 American Pre-Code early sound musical drama film directed by James Cruze, based on Ben Hecht's 1928 short story "The Rival Dummy", and starring Erich von Stroheim and Betty Compson. The film features songs by Lynn Cowan, Paul Titsworth, Donald McNamee, and King Zany.

Originally released by Sono Art-World Wide Pictures, certain sequences were presented in Multicolor. However, current prints, restored by the Library of Congress and released by Kino International on DVD, exist only in black-and-white.

== Plot ==
The Great Gabbo (1929)

Brilliant ventriloquist Gabbo increasingly uses his dummy "Otto" as his only means of self-expression—an artist driven insane by his work. Gabbo's gimmick is his astonishing ability to make Otto talk—and even sing—while Gabbo himself smokes, drinks, and eats. Gabbo's girlfriend and assistant Mary loves him, but is driven to leave him by his megalomania, superstitions, irritability, and inability to express any human emotion without using Otto as an intermediary. In Otto's voice, Gabbo accepts the blame for Mary's leaving and recounts all the things she did for him, but as Gabbo he denies his feelings and tells the dummy to shut up.

Two years later, Gabbo has become a nationally renowned ventriloquist. He is revered for his talent, even as he is ridiculed for his eccentricity; he takes Otto with him everywhere he goes, even dining out with him, providing much entertainment to the restaurant patrons. Despite his success, he continues to pine for Mary, who is now romantically involved with another singer/dancer, Frank. With both Mary and Frank performing in a show in which Gabbo is the headliner, he attempts to win her back. Mary is charmed by Gabbo's new romantic behavior, driving Frank to angry fits of jealousy. As his courtship meets with continued success, Gabbo increasingly expresses his emotions to Mary directly, without using Otto.

One day, Gabbo finds that in his absence, Mary has straightened up his dressing room the way that she always used to. Convinced that she wants to come back to him, he confronts her with his feelings, admitting his loneliness without her and in the process revealing that he has grown past many of his old failings, such as his superstitions and obsession with his personal success. However, Mary tells him that she loves Frank, and has been married to him since before Gabbo came back into her life. She says that she missed Otto but not Gabbo, and in a last farewell she says, "I love you" to Otto.

In profound frustration at this, after Mary is gone, Gabbo punches Otto in the face, but immediately apologizes and embraces the dummy, weeping. He then storms onto the stage during the finale and loudly rants at the performers. He is forced off the stage and fired from the show. Mary tries to confront Gabbo afterwards, but he only looks at her sadly and walks away. Workers take down the letters advertising "The Great Gabbo" from the marquee as Gabbo looks on.

== Cast ==
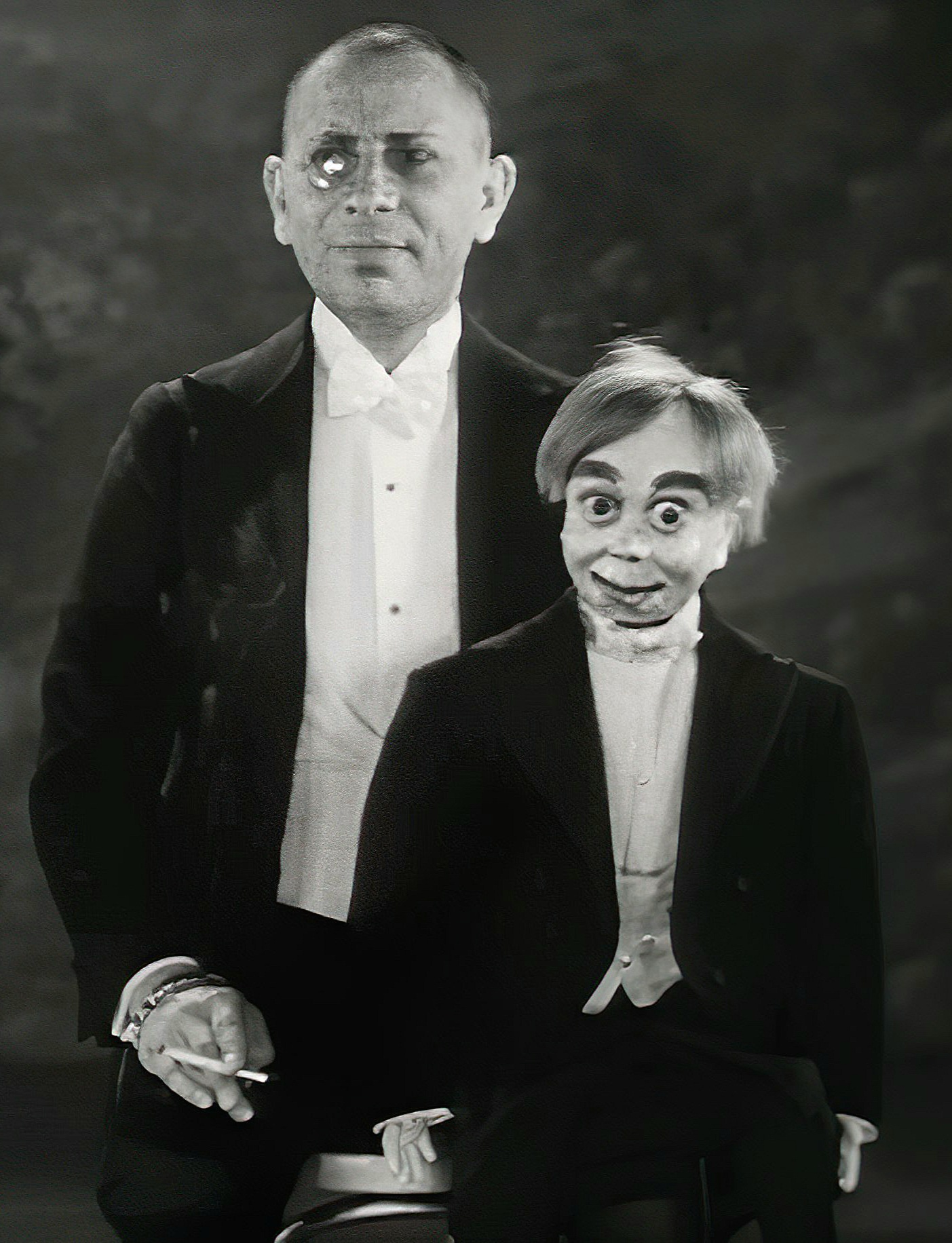
Gabbo and his ventriloquist dummy Otto

- Erich von Stroheim as the Great Gabbo
- Betty Compson as Mary
- Donald Douglas as Frank
- Marjorie Kane as Babe
- John F. Hamilton as Neighbour (uncredited)

== Production ==
Touted in advertising as an "all-dialog singing, dancing and dramatic spectacle", this early sound film interweaves stark drama with gratuitous full-length, large-scale, on-stage musical production numbers such as "Every Now and Then", "I'm in Love with You", "The New Step", "The Web of Love", and the now-missing "The Ga Ga Bird", which was filmed in color. The "Web of Love" number, in which the performers wear stylized spider and fly costumes, is occasionally shown on Classic Arts Showcase. Footage from the dance sequences was reused with different music in The Girl from Calgary (1932).

The public domain version available on Internet Archive runs 68 minutes, while the original film ran 96 minutes, including the exit music. The opening credits mention "Color sequences by Multicolor", but those sequences are now either lost or have survived only in black-and-white form. Multicolor, based on the earlier Prizma color process, went out of business in 1932; its assets were bought by Cinecolor.

The quality and clarity of the film sound is notable.

A 94-minute public-domain version is now available.

== Response ==
The Great Gabbo opened to lukewarm reviews. Stroheim received good notices, but the film did nothing to further his career. Photoplay called the film "a bitter disappointment... Cruze seems to have lost his sense of humor, and the lighting and scenario are terrible." The New York Times review commented unfavorably on the technical quality of the color sequences. Historian Arthur Lennig wrote that The Great Gabbo "betrays little inventiveness and shows few of its actors to advantage." He notes that due to obvious budget constraints, several line-flubs by cast members made it into the final cut.

== Soundtrack ==
- "Every Now and Then"
  - Sung by Marjorie Kane and Donald Douglas
- "I'm In Love With You"
  - Sung by Betty Compson and Donald Douglas
  - Written by Lynn Cowan and Paul Titsworth
- "The New Step"
  - Sung by Marjorie Kane and chorus
  - Written by Lynn Cowan and Paul Titsworth
- "I'm Laughing"
  - Sung by Otto the dummy, with Erich von Stroheim
  - Written by King Zany and Donald McNamee
- "Icky" (the lollipop song)
  - Sung by Otto the dummy, with Erich von Stroheim
  - Written by King Zany and Donald McNamee
- "The Web Of Love"
  - Sung by Betty Compson and Donald Douglas
  - Written by Lynn Cowan and Paul Titsworth
- "The Ga Ga Bird"
  - (missing from known prints but major production number glimpsed among Gabbo's hallucinations)

== Legacy ==
Footage was used on Fractured Flickers in the segment "Hymie und Me" (Episode 14), in which the dummy is presented as a living, sentient comedian with von Stroheim as his straight man. The Simpsons used the ventriloquist-dummy idea represented here for the episode "Krusty Gets Kancelled", where Gabbo is the name of a walking, talking, singing (and not very kind or nice) dummy who works with a man named Arthur Crandall; later episodes would show that Gabbo had been ruined by scandal and left to do performances at casinos and other low-rent locales.

== See also ==
- Dead of Night, a 1945 British film
- Knock on Wood, a 1954 film
- "The Dummy" a 1962 episode of The Twilight Zone
- "Caesar and Me", a 1964 episode of The Twilight Zone
- Devil Doll, a 1964 film
- Magic, a 1978 film
- The Ventriloquist and Scarface, a nemesis in Batman comics, first appearing in 1988
- "Krusty Gets Kancelled", a 1993 episode of The Simpsons, which features a similar ventriloquism act with a doll named Gabbo
- List of early color feature films
- List of early sound feature films (1926–1929)
