= The Brain Center at Whipple's =

- The Twilight Zone episode
- Episode no.: Season 5 Episode 33
- Directed by: Richard Donner
- Written by: Rod Serling
- Production code: 2632
- Original air date: May 15, 1964

Guest appearances
- Richard Deacon; Paul Newlan; Ted de Corsia; Thalmus Rasulala (as Jack Crowder); Robby the Robot [uncredited cameo]

Episode chronology
← Previous "Mr. Garrity and the Graves"	Next → "Come Wander with Me"
- The Twilight Zone (1959 TV series) (season 5)

"The Brain Center at Whipple's" is episode 153 of the American television series The Twilight Zone. It originally aired on May 15, 1964, on CBS.

== Opening narration ==
These are the players—with or without a scorecard. In one corner a machine; in the other, one Wallace V. Whipple, man. And the game? It happens to be the historical battle between flesh and steel, between the brain of man and the product of man's brain. We don't make book on this one and predict no winner....but we can tell you for this particular contest, there is standing room only—in the Twilight Zone.

== Plot ==
In the future of 1967, Wallace V. Whipple, owner of a vast Midwestern manufacturing corporation, decides to upgrade his plant to increase profits by installing a machine named the "X109B14 modified transistorized totally automatic assembly machine", which leads to tens of thousands of layoffs. Some former employees try to convince him that the value of a man outweighs that of a machine, but their protests fall on deaf ears. His plant manager, Mr. Hanley, reminds him that Whipple's father, who ran the factory for 40 years, while profit-driven, had a sense of responsibility to his factory workers, and their pride in their work. Whipple coldly responds that while his father only "doubled" his factory production, his competitors quadrupled theirs. Dickerson, an angry veteran foreman, tries to smash the machine but is shot and injured by Whipple. While Hanley visits Dickerson in the hospital, Whipple is only concerned about his equipment. Hanley confronts Whipple about it and is summarily fired after being shown the machine replacing him. Whipple proceeds to replace secretaries with automated dictation machines, thinking that powder room breaks and maternity leave are inconveniences.

Whipple eventually fires all his human employees after replacing them with machines, which then turn on him (perhaps only in his mind) by spitting out the harsh demeaning recorded parting words of his former employees back at him over and over, driving Whipple to insanity.

Eventually, the board of directors find him neurotically obsessed with machines and retire him. Whipple joins Hanley at the bar opposite his factory and expresses deep sorrow at his misfortune as he rambles about how it is not fair that machines are replacing men, his poetic justice for caring more about machines in the first place. He also admits that he is lonely because he is not married and has no family and that he feels cast aside like a used part.

The last scene reveals Whipple's replacement to be a robot (Robby the Robot), which swings Whipple's key on a chain the same way he used to.

== Closing narration ==
There are many bromides applicable here: 'too much of a good thing', 'tiger by the tail', 'as you sow so shall you reap'. The point is that, too often, Man becomes clever instead of becoming wise; he becomes inventive and not thoughtful; and sometimes, as in the case of Mr. Whipple, he can create himself right out of existence. As in tonight's tale of oddness and obsolescence, in the Twilight Zone.

== Cast ==
- Richard Deacon as Wallace V. Whipple
- Paul Newlan as Walter Hanley
- Ted de Corsia as Dickerson
- Thalmus Rasulala (credited as Jack Crowder) as Technician
- Shawn Michaels as Bartender
- Burt Conroy as Watchman
- Robby the Robot as himself

== Production notes ==
The robot that ultimately replaces Mr. Whipple is "Robby the Robot" from the 1956 Sci-Fi film Forbidden Planet. "Robby" appeared in two other episodes of The Twilight Zone: "One for the Angels", the second episode of the series (as a miniature toy), and "Uncle Simon".

== In popular culture ==
- Sludge metal band Melvins named a song on their album Hostile Ambient Takeover after the episode.
- The episode was parodied in the Futurama episode "Benderama".
- The name Whipple can be seen in various episodes of the third revival series.
