= A Kind of a Stopwatch =

- The Twilight Zone episode
- Episode no.: Season 5 Episode 4
- Directed by: John Rich
- Story by: Michael D. Rosenthal
- Teleplay by: Rod Serling
- Production code: 2609
- Original air date: October 18, 1963

Guest appearances
- Richard Erdman; Herbie Faye; Leon Belasco; Doris Singleton; Roy Roberts; Richard Wessel; Ray Kellog; Ken Drake

Episode chronology
← Previous "Nightmare at 20,000 Feet"	Next → "The Last Night of a Jockey"
- The Twilight Zone (1959 TV series) (season 5)

"A Kind of a Stopwatch" is a 1963 episode of the American television anthology series The Twilight Zone. In this episode, a man acquires a stopwatch which can stop time.

== Opening narration ==
Submitted for your approval or at least your analysis: one Patrick Thomas McNulty, who, at age forty-one, is the biggest bore on Earth. He holds a ten-year record for the most meaningless words spewed out during a coffee break. And it's very likely that, as of this moment, he would have gone through life in precisely this manner, a dull, argumentative bigmouth who sets back the art of conversation a thousand years. I say he very likely would have except for something that will soon happen to him, something that will considerably alter his existence—and ours. Now you think about that now, because this is—The Twilight Zone.

== Plot ==
Patrick McNulty is a self-important, annoying man in his 40s. One day, he is summoned by his boss, Mr. Cooper. McNulty is delighted, believing that his frequent contributions to the suggestion box have earned him recognition. Cooper, however, says that all of McNulty's suggestions deal with fields of enterprise in which the company is not involved and fires McNulty for wasting his time.

McNulty goes to Joe Palucci's bar, where he drives away the other patrons with his opinions about a sporting event. Palucci requests that McNulty patronize another establishment, but McNulty ignores him and buys a drink for the sole remaining patron, Potts, a drunk who spews various phrases from times long past. In return, Potts gives McNulty his stopwatch. Thinking it an odd gift, McNulty quickly discovers that it pauses time for everyone and everything except for the watch holder.

McNulty tries to show Cooper the stopwatch's power in the hopes of improving their company, but Cooper does not understand McNulty and dismisses him. Returning to the bar, McNulty tries to demonstrate the watch's power to the customers, but does it in such a way that they do not understand again.

Deciding to rob a bank, McNulty uses the watch to freeze everyone inside, then wheels a cart stacked with cash out of the vault. However, he drops the watch on his way out, breaking it and permanently freezing time. With no way to repair it, McNulty frantically begs for help from the frozen people around him.

== Closing narration ==
Mr. Patrick Thomas McNulty, who had a gift of time. He used it and he misused it, and now he's just been handed the bill. Tonight's tale of motion and McNulty—in the Twilight Zone.

== Cast ==
- Richard Erdman as McNulty
- Herbie Faye as Joe Palucci
- Leon Belasco as Potts
- Doris Singleton as Secretary
- Roy Roberts as Mr. Cooper
- Richard Wessel as Charlie
- Ray Kellogg as Fred (credited as "Ray Kellog")
- Ken Drake as Daniel
- Sam Balter (uncredited)
- Al Silvani (uncredited)

== Adaptation ==
The television episode was later adapted as an episode of The Twilight Zone Radio Dramas series under the title "A Kind of Stopwatch", featuring Lou Diamond Phillips in the lead role.

== Related works ==
The episode has been parodied by a number of animated series, including in the Johnny Bravo episode "The Day the Earth Didn't Move Around Very Much"; the Simpsons episode "Treehouse of Horror XIV"; The Garfield Show episode "Time Master"; and "Meanwhile", the Season 7 finale of Futurama.

== See also ==
- List of The Twilight Zone (1959 TV series) episodes
- "A Little Peace and Quiet", an episode of the 1985 revival of The Twilight Zone
- Click (2006), an Adam Sandler film
- The Girl, the Gold Watch & Everything, a John D. MacDonald novel
- Bernard's Watch, a British children's TV show.
