= Robby the Robot =

Fictional film and television character

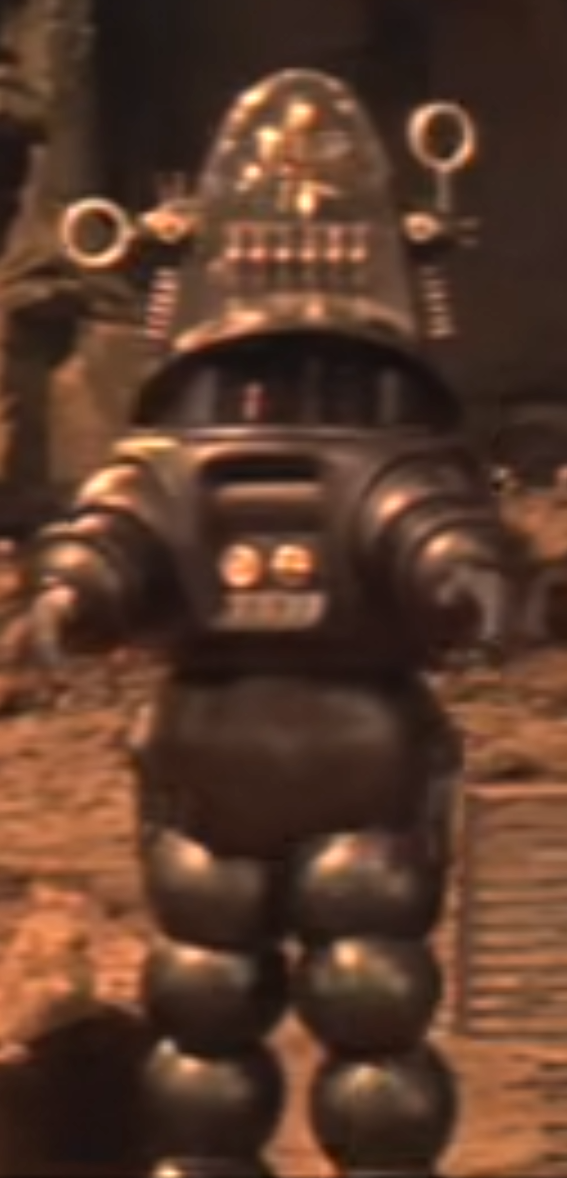
- Robby the Robot in Forbidden Planet (1956)
- First appearance: Forbidden Planet (1956)
- Last appearance: The Invisible Boy (1957)
- Created by: A. Arnold Gillespie; Arthur Lonergan; Irving Block

Robby the Robot is a fictional character who first appeared in the 1956 film Forbidden Planet. He made a number of subsequent appearances in science fiction films and television programs, which has given him the distinction as "the hardest working robot in Hollywood".

== Precursors of the name ==
The name "Robbie" (spelled with an "ie") had appeared in science fiction before Forbidden Planet. In a pulp magazine adventure The Fantastic Island (1935), the name is used for a mechanical likeness of Doc Savage used to confuse foes. The name is also used in Isaac Asimov's short story "Robbie" (1940) about a first-generation robot designed to care for children. In Tom Swift on The Phantom Satellite (1956), it is also the name given to a small four-footed robot designed by Tom Swift Jr., the boy inventor in the Tom Swift Jr. science fiction novel series by Victor Appleton II.

== Forbidden Planet ==
=== Story background ===
Robby the Robot originated as a supporting character in the 1956 MGM science fiction film Forbidden Planet. The film's storyline centers on a crew of Earth explorers who land their starship, the C57-D, on the planet Altair IV, inhabited by the mysterious human Dr. Morbius and his daughter Altaira who was born there. Robby is a mechanical servant that Morbius has designed, built, and programmed using knowledge gleaned from his study of the ancient Krell, a long-extinct race of highly intelligent beings that once populated Altair IV. The film’s plot is loosely based on William Shakespeare’s play The Tempest (1610), with the planet Altair IV standing in for Shakespeare’s remote island and Dr. Morbius for Prospero. In this context Robby is analogous to Ariel, a spirit enslaved by Prospero.

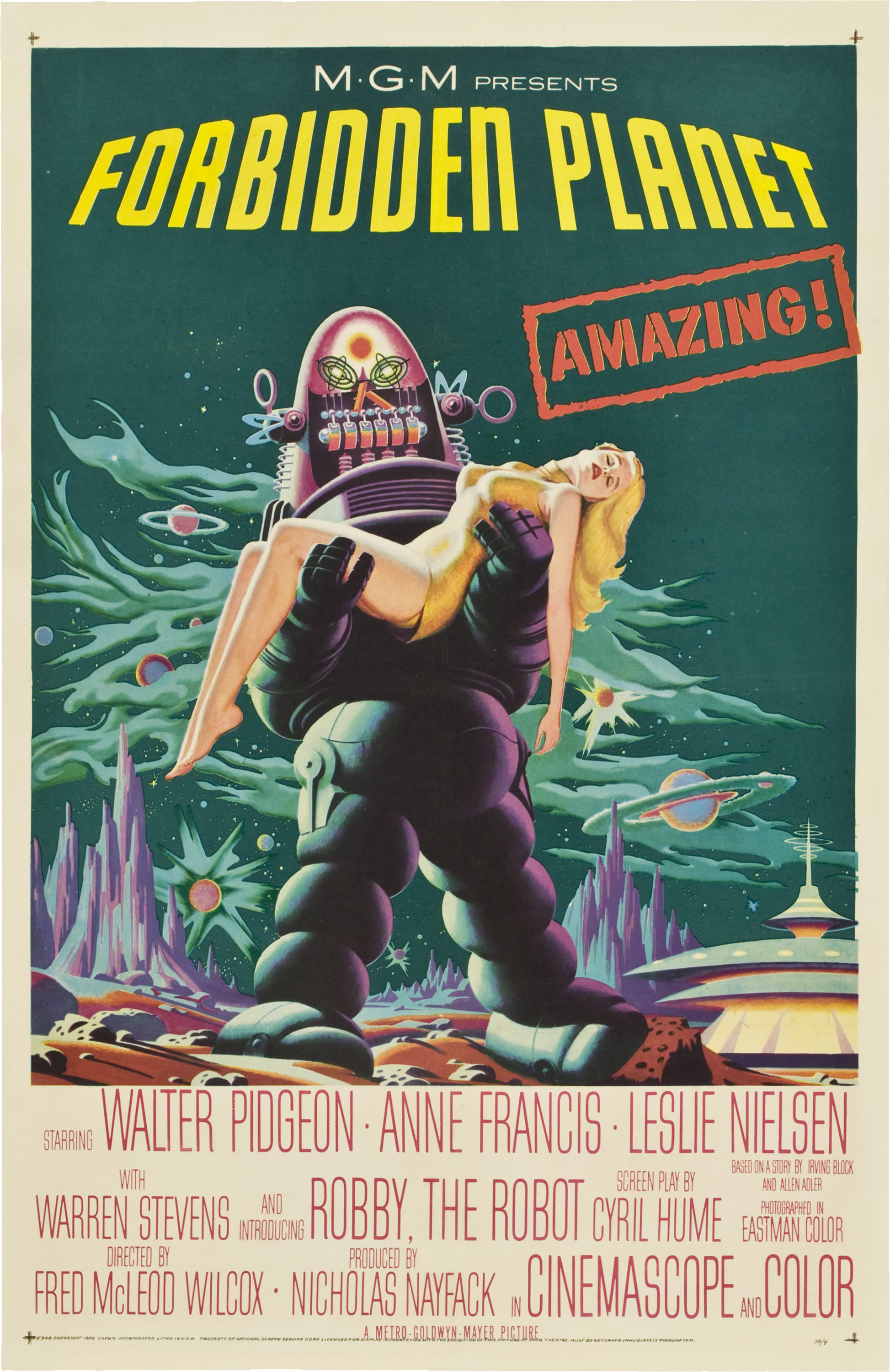
Robby the Robot in a poster for the original release of Forbidden Planet. (The lurid presentation does not accurately reflect the character in the film.)

Robby exhibits artificial intelligence, but has a distinct personality that at times exhibits a dry wit. He is instructed by Morbius to be helpful to the Earthmen and does so by synthesizing and transporting to their landing site 10 tons of "isotope 217", a lightweight though still effective replacement for the requested lead shielding needed to house the C57-D’s main stardrive to power an attempt to contact Earth base for further instructions. Morbius programmed Robby to obey a system of rules similar to Isaac Asimov’s Three Laws of Robotics as expressed in I, Robot (1950). One of the laws is a rule against harming or killing humans. This becomes an important plot point near the conclusion of the film when Robby refuses to kill the Id monster; he recognizes the invisible creature to be an alter ego/avatar of Dr. Morbius. Hollywood purposely, and misleadingly, depicts Robby in the film’s advertising posters as a terrifying adversarial creature carrying a seductively posed unconscious maiden (Altaira), but no such scene is in the film and the images do not reflect in any way Robby's benevolent and intelligent character. Robby only carries one person during the film, the Earth starship's Dr. Ostrow, when he is mortally wounded near the end of the film.

=== Design and construction ===
Robby was designed by members of the MGM art department and constructed by the studio's prop department; The design was developed from initial ideas and sketches by production designer Arnold "Buddy" Gillespie, art director Arthur Lonergan, and writer Irving Block. These concepts were refined by production illustrator Mentor Huebner and perfected by MGM staff production draughtsman and mechanical designer Robert Kinoshita.

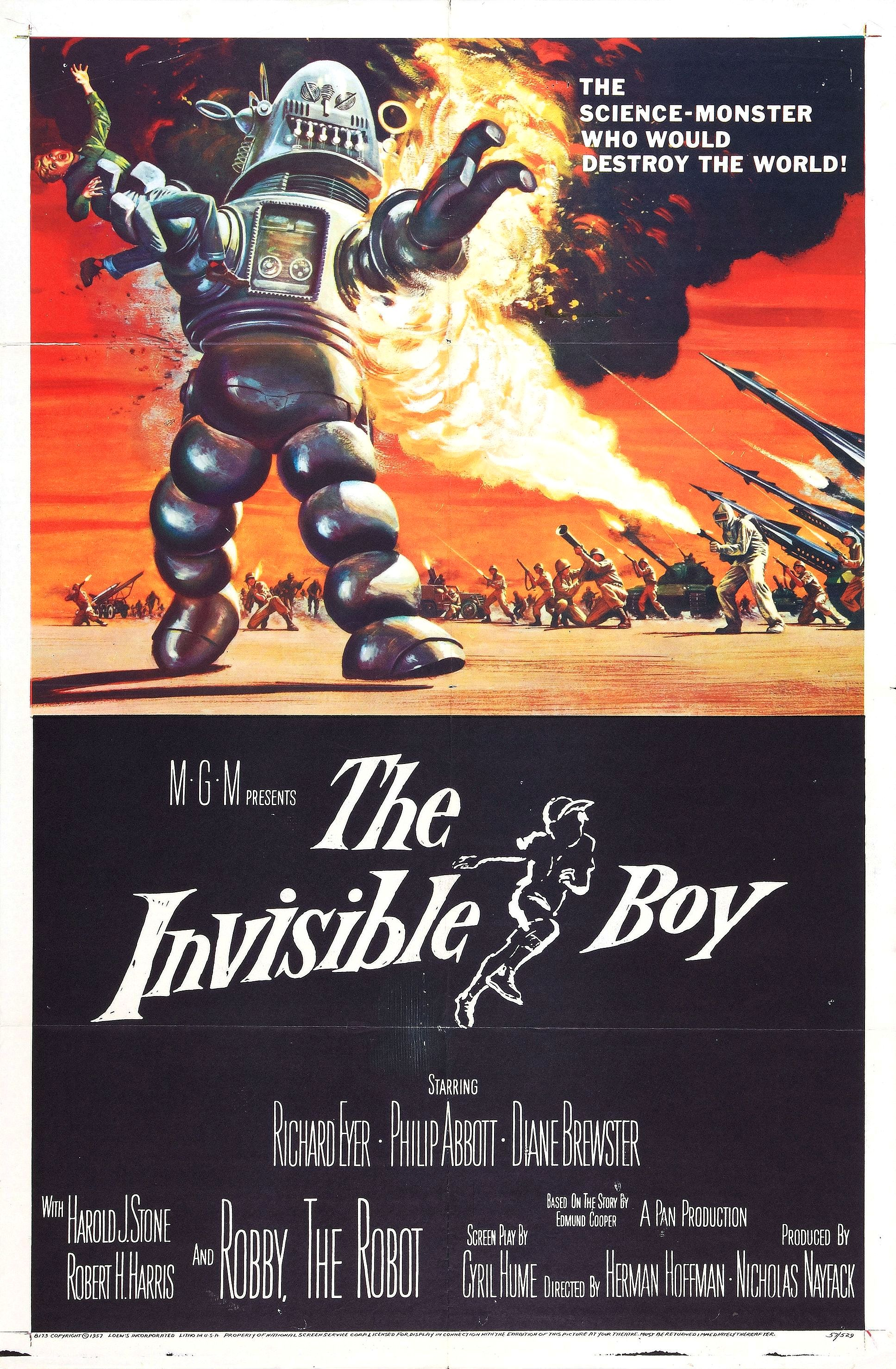
Robby the Robot in a poster for the original release of The Invisible Boy

The robot's groundbreaking design and execution represented a radical advance on the conventional "walking oil-can" depictions of robots in earlier feature films and movie serials. The only previous film robot of comparable style and quality was the Maschinenmensch created for Fritz Lang's Metropolis (1927). However, this did not come cheap: As with every aspect of the production of Forbidden Planet, MGM spared no expense on Robby's design and construction. With reported costs ranging from $100,000 and $125,000 (equivalent to at least $US1.1 million today) it was, proportional to total budget, one of the most expensive single film props ever created up to that time, which represented nearly 7% of the film's total budget of US$1.9 million. (By way of comparison, Robby cost roughly the same, proportional to total budget, as the massive 27-ton, 12 meter-diameter, rotating centrifuge set built for Kubrick's 2001: A Space Odyssey, which cost US$750,000 against a total budget of around US$11 million). But thanks to its imaginative design, intricate detailing, and the very high visual quality of the final product, Robby immediately became the "face" of the film and soon became an enduring popular culture icon.

Robby was constructed using a range of materials including metal, plastic, rubber, glass, and Plexiglas. The plastic parts were a pioneering example of the use of the then-novel technology of vacuum-forming heated plastic over wooden molds. These parts were made from an early form of ABS plastic with the brand name "Royalite", a material mainly used at the time for making suitcases. The finished Robby stands just over 7.02-foot (2.14 m) tall and was fabricated in three detachable sections: the legs and lower torso, the barrel-like chest section (which included the arms), and the highly detailed head piece.

The tall paraboloidal plexiglass dome that covered the head housed the detailed mechanisms representing Robby's electronic brain. These included a "pilot light" at the very top, an intricate apparatus terminating in three white wire-frame spheres that rotate in planetary fashion (representing his gyroscopic stabilizers), a pair of reciprocating arms in the shape of an inverted "V", multiple flashing lights, and an elaborate horizontal array of moving levers resembling saxophone keys. Conical protuberances attached to each side of the head carry two small forward-facing blinking lights (his eyes) and two rotating chromed rings, one mounted vertically and the other horizontally, which represent Robby's audio detectors (his ears). The bottom front section of the head is a curved grille consisting of parallel rows of thin blue neon tubes, which light up in voice synchronization when Robby speaks. This neon grille also enabled the operator to both see out and to breathe. The joint between the head and chest section was fitted with a custom-made bearing that allowed the head to rotate in either direction.

Robby's bulky barrel-shaped torso (a sly reference to Bob Kinoshita's earlier job as a washing machine designer) featured a front panel fitted with a rectangular door at the top (into which samples of any substance could be inserted for Robby to analyze and replicate); underneath the slot were two rotating discs fitted with small flashing lights and below that a row of five buttons that moved in and out. Robby's thick, stubby arms were connected to his body with plastic ball-joints that fitted into matching sockets in the torso, allowing the joints a small amount of rotational movement. The arms could also be extended and this section was covered with an expanding concertina-type tubular rubber sheath. Robby's three-fingered hands were also made of rubber, finished with the suit's overall gunmetal metallic gray paint. The chest section attached to the leg section with special locking clips. The bottom section of the suit hinged at the top of the legs, allowing Robby to both bend forward and swing each leg backward and forward slightly, enabling him to walk with relative ease (albeit with rather small and stiff steps). Robby's legs were made from interlocking globes of vacuum-formed plastic, which were connected by internal jointing that permitted the entire leg to bend slightly, but cleverly concealed the movement of the hips and knees of the human operator inside.

Robby's design was a major advance on all previous screen robots in many practical and aesthetic respects. By comparison, the robot Gort, the menacing "interstellar policeman" from the science fiction film The Day the Earth Stood Still (1951) was a very tall man in the robot suit, and its smooth design posed several practical problems for shooting. Because it was made of flexible neoprene overall, similar to a skin diver's wetsuit, the props team had to fabricate two suits that laced up in order to keep the fastenings out of sight while filming Gort moving: One suit laced up at the back (for frontal shots), and the second, which laced up from the front, was used for the shots in which Gort was seen from behind. The neoprene suit creased at the hips, back knees, and front elbows when the actor inside moved, giving the impression of being made from a flexible alien metal. The filmmakers diminished the effect by cleverly keeping Gort's movements to a minimum or by only shooting his upper body when he walked.

Robby's similar size and its construction from rigid sections that had articulated joints combined to create a convincing viewing experience. To access the suit, the three sections were dismantled and the operator climbed into the legs. The torso was then placed around him, the two sections were secured with internal clips, and the operator was strapped into an internal over-the-shoulder harness; finally the head was fitted, the internal electronics were connected to external power via hidden cables, and the suit was switched on and ready for filming. This design made it possible to film Robby from any angle and for him to move about and carry out the actions required in a scene, without either betraying the obvious presence of an interior operator or revealing how each got in and out; Robby was operated (uncredited) by stuntmen Frankie Darro and Frankie Carpenter, both short actors (Darro was 5'3").

One of the suit's few drawbacks was that the many intricate moving parts in the electrified headpiece made a considerable amount of noise when Robby was powered up. During shooting, Robby's voice was performed off-camera by an uncredited actor, who spoke lines into a microphone that fed into a voice-actuated circuit connected by a cable running into Robby's foot, up through a leg, and all the way to the neon tubes in Robby's lower headpiece; this device generated a control voltage that synchronized the voicebox's flashing neon tubes. Robby's screen voice in the finished film was re-recorded in post-production by Marvin Miller. (Les Tremayne read the film's opening prologue.)

== Later appearances ==
The costly prop was used in numerous later productions for cinema and television, and the robot quickly became a science fiction icon in the decades that followed. Robby was reused by MGM in The Invisible Boy (1957) and its television appearances include episodes of The Gale Storm Show, The Thin Man, Columbo, The Addams Family and Lost in Space where he battles The Robot. While Robby's appearance was generally consistent, there were exceptions.

The original Rod Serling incarnation of The Twilight Zone, which was filmed at Metro-Goldwyn-Mayer, made extensive use of that studio's props and costumes originally created for Forbidden Planet, including Robby, who appeared in three episodes over the series' original run: "One for the Angels" (s01e02, 1959), "Uncle Simon" (s05e08, 1963) and "The Brain Center at Whipple's" (s05e33, 1964). In "Uncle Simon" (1963), Robby's appearance was considerably altered, combining the familiar body with an alternative head piece. According to Robby's past owner, director William Malone, the head used in this episode was a prototype created during Robby's original construction at MGM. It featured a highly simplified and rather old-fashioned cylindrical "oil can" robot head with stylized "eyes" (that were illuminated and movable) and a circular "mouth"; this was enclosed under the distinctively-shaped conical plexiglass dome, but this head's front grille also did not have the blue neon tubes and lacked the rotating external "ear" pieces seen in Forbidden Planet. It is not known whether this internal "oil-can" head was original, but its rather rudimentary design and appearance is clearly not of the same exacting MGM standards that are evident in all other Forbidden Planet props, and suggests it may have been custom-made for the filming of this Twilight Zone episode. However, this version of the prop survives and was also owned until recently by William Malone.

In other appearances, Robby usually retained the moving parts inside his transparent dome, although the details of his "brain" and chest panel were sometimes altered; in The Man from U.N.C.L.E. episode "The Bridge of Lions Affair", only Robby's head dome was used as part of a regeneration machine. Robby also appeared in the Mork & Mindy second-season episode "Dr. Morkenstein", this time representing a character called Chuck (voiced by Roddy McDowall) whom Mork befriends while working as a security guard in the science museum where Chuck is on display. Robby was given a major makeover for his appearance in the TV series Project U.F.O. (1978). The original head was removed and replaced with a newly constructed "cyclops" head that had new internal "brain" fittings, a much squatter (roughly hemispherical) perspex dome, and a large circular glowing green "eye" on the front, mounted in a protruding triangular panel. The front panel on Robby's torso was also modified with the addition of a new protruding panel, and additional appliances and cables were added to the front of both legs. This "cyclops" version of Robby was also used in the 1977 TV series Space Academy and the 1988 B-movie Phantom Empire. All appearances of Robby after 1971 used a replica, as the original was retired and put on display in a southern California car museum (see below).

Robby made few appearances after the 1970s, but he does have a cameo in the film Gremlins (1984); he can be seen standing in the background speaking some of his trademark lines. Aside from that, he also appeared in Looney Tunes: Back in Action (2003). He was also featured in a 2006 commercial for AT&T.

Robby the Robot was inducted into the Robot Hall of Fame in 2004.

== Original "Robby" suit ==
In 1971, the original 1956 Robby the Robot was sold to Jim Brucker and put on display at his Movie World/Cars of the Stars Museum, near Disneyland in Buena Park, California, where it was often vandalized by visitors. Robot historian Fred Barton was commissioned to restore Robby to its original 1956 state while the robot was still on display at the museum. Barton used original duplicate replacement parts made for Forbidden Planet by MGM's prop department. It was, however, in a desperate condition once again several years later. The museum closed in 1980, and the prop – along with its transport vehicle, original MGM spare parts, and shipping containers – was sold to William Malone. Malone noted that Robby had once again fallen into a state of disrepair. Having built the first replica of Robby in 1973, Malone was able to carefully restore the robot prop to its original condition using additional spare parts which the original builders had stockpiled in its storage cases some 25 years earlier. The original Robby the Robot remained in Malone's original Forbidden Planet props collection for many years, until finally being sold by Bonhams Auctioneers in New York on November 21, 2017, for US$5,375,000. Robby became the most expensive film prop ever sold at auction.

== Replicas ==
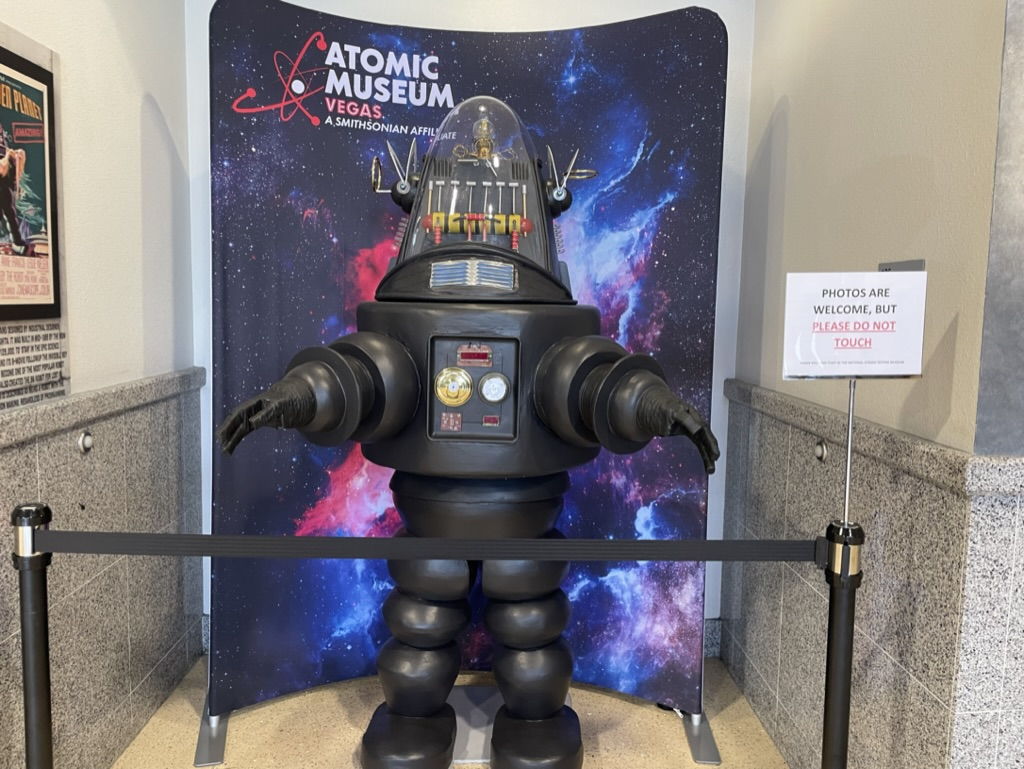
Robby replica at the National Atomic Testing Museum in Las Vegas

Fred Barton built a second Robby replica which appeared at the 1974 Star Trek Convention in Los Angeles. Barton continues to produce Robby props and other 1:1 robot replicas. His recreations are currently on display at the Experience Music Project and Science Fiction Museum and Hall of Fame in Seattle, Washington, and at the Metreon entertainment complex in San Francisco; other Robby replicas are on display in various venues.

A replica or variant of Robby is on display at the National Atomic Testing Museum in Las Vegas as a sci-fi pop culture artifact from the 1950s.

== List of appearances ==
- Forbidden Planet (1956)
- The Invisible Boy (1957)
- The Thin Man (1958) – season 1 episode "Robot Client", first aired February 28, 1958
- The Gale Storm Show (1958) – season 3 episode "Robot from Inner Space", first aired December 13, 1958
- The Many Loves of Dobie Gillis (1963) – season 4 episode "Beethoven, Presley, and Me", first aired March 13, 1963
- The Twilight Zone
  - Episode "One for the Angels" (1959) – as a tinplate battery operated toy
  - Episode "Uncle Simon" (1963); fitted with simplified prototype head for this appearance
  - Episode "The Brain Center at Whipple's" (1964)
- Hazel (1962) – season 2 episode "Rosie's Contract", first aired September 27, 1962
- The Addams Family in the episode "Lurch's Little Helper" (S2, Ep27) aired March 18, 1966
- The Man from U.N.C.L.E.
  - Episode "The Bridge of Lions Affair" (1966)
  - Feature film One of Our Spies Is Missing (1966)
- Lost in Space (1966 and 1967) – in two episodes as two different characters (in "War of the Robots" as a robotoid)
- Ultraseven (1967) – A race of Robots called the 'U-Toms' bear Robby's likeness in one episode.
- The Banana Splits (1968 and 1970 "The Coronation of Bakaar") – recurring appearance as a maid named "Mildred the Robot" does not have plexiglass dome
- Columbo: "Mind Over Mayhem" – as "MM7" (1974)
- Hollywood Boulevard (1976)
- Ark II (1976) – in the episode "The Robot"
- Holmes & Yo-Yo (1976)
- Music Machine (1977) – a K-tel compilation LP, photographs featured on both the front and back of the cover. In the commercial for the LP, Robby dances to some of the album's songs.
- Project U.F.O. (1978) – season 1 episode "Sighting 4010: The Waterford Incident". Here, the costume has a different, flatter head and 'brain' elements with a large "Cyclops" eye, a modified torso panel and assorted add-ons to the legs.
- Television commercial for Starlog (1978)
- The New Adventures of Wonder Woman (1979) – season 3 episode "Spaced Out", as the master of ceremonies at a science fiction convention
- Mork & Mindy (1979) – season 2 episode "Dr. Morkenstein", as a robot named Chuck, in a museum, who becomes friends with Mork.
- Space Academy (1979) – episode "My Favorite Marcia". This program used the 'Cyclops' head variation previously seen on Project U.F.O..
- Pink Lady (1980) – episode 5, a brief cameo.
- Heavy Metal (1981) – cameo as a hot dog vendor during the "Harry Canyon" segment.
- Television commercial for Charmin (1981) – as an assistant to Mr. Whipple, named Squeezak, repeating the phrase "Don't squeeze Charmin".
- Night Stalker video game (1982) – featured in the print advertising for the Mattel video game for the IBM and Mac
- The Love Boat – episode "Programmed for Love", credited as "BIX"
- Likely Stories, Vol. 3 (1983) – Maid
- Gremlins (1984) – in the background during the inventors' convention scenes
- Phantom Empire (1988) third screen appearance with the Project U.F.O. 'Cyclops' head and other modifications
- Cherry 2000 (1988)
- Earth Girls Are Easy (1988) – during a dream sequence
- Star Kid (1998) – footage from Lost in Space featuring Robby is shown on a TV
- Duck Dodgers (2003) – Season 1 Episode 2, cartoonized as Agent Roboto
- Looney Tunes: Back in Action (2003)
- Stacked (2005) – as the Nightmare NASA Robot in "Gavin's Pipe Dream" (S04E04)
- Television commercial for AT&T (2006) – with WOPR, KITT, and Rosie the Robot Maid
- Television commercial for General Electric (2012) – with KITT and other robots
- The Big Bang Theory (2014) – Season 8 Episode 7, with other movie props

== Bibliography ==
- Appleton II, Victor. Tom Swift and the Phantom Satellite. New York: Grosset & Dunlap, 1956. ISBN 978-0-00162-220-3.
- Hagerty, Jack. The Saucer Fleet. Livermore, California: Apogee Books, 2008. ISBN 978-1-894959-70-4.
