= The Girl, the Gold Watch & Everything =

1962 novel by John D. MacDonald

- Author: John D. MacDonald
- Language: English
- Genre: Science fiction
- Publisher: Fawcett Gold Medal
- Publication date: 1962
- Publication place: United States
- Media type: Print

The Girl, the Gold Watch & Everything (1962) is a science fiction novel by the American writer John D. MacDonald.

== Plot synopsis ==
Kirby Winter is a young man living in Florida, full of anxiety and feeling no confidence in his ability to face life, either professionally (he has not chosen a clear profession) or sexually (all his encounters with women end disastrously).

Kirby's life has been overshadowed by an uncle who had been a mathematics teacher and suddenly developed an uncanny talent for gambling, broke several casinos, and made himself a millionaire. The uncle seemed disappointed with Kirby's inability to make something of himself. Upon his death, he left Kirby nothing but an antique gold pocket watch to which a toy telescope is attached, showing a pornographic picture.

An older, attractive woman shows up and makes clear her interest in Kirby. He is attracted to her but feels too insecure to respond to her attempts at seduction – which turns out to be fortunate, as she is a hardened, ruthless criminal and his uncle's archenemy. The uncle many times thwarted the plots of her and her male partner, got away with quite a bit of their ill-gained money, and avoided with contemptuous ease all that they tried to do against him. Her interest in the nephew derives from the vain hope of learning the uncle's secret (of which Kirby has no idea).

Kirby's luck turns when he sleeps in the bed of a friend of a friend who is away for the weekend. In the middle of the night, a naked young woman gets into the bed and has sex with him in the dark, mistaking him for the bed's usual occupant. All of Kirby's sexual hang-ups disappear, and he performs quite well. Discovering her mistake, the woman – Bonnie Lee Beaumont – is at first furious but within minutes the two fall deeply and enduringly in love and consummate their new-found love for the rest of the night.

The following day, spent on the seashore, Kirby plays with the watch and accidentally finds out his uncle's secret: the watch can stop time for everybody but the holder, leaving him in a peculiar red-lighted world with everybody around "frozen", effectively placing everybody else in the world at his mercy. Kirby and his newly found girlfriend use this power for relatively innocuous practical jokes such as completely undressing women who "tease men by wearing very small bikinis" and laughing to see them escape in panic.

The woman criminal, who meanwhile discovered the watch's secret, has far more sinister plans for its use and succeeds in capturing Kirby, who comes near to being killed – but he turns the tables on her with the help of the watch. He can easily use the watch's power to kill her but decides that using it to kill anybody – even those who deserve it – would "take away the fun"; he settles instead for stripping her and putting her in a truckload of Navy sailors, with the resulting experience causing her to lose interest in the watch (and everything else) in favor of sexual trysts with sailors.

In the aftermath, Kirby Winter and Bonnie Lee Beaumont join the international jet set, living in luxury, traveling between resorts, gambling at casinos and winning, and fending off dangerous gangsters by playing practical jokes on them

== Reception ==
One newspaper book columnist called it "an unusual novel by this master of suspense. If you accept the main idea, it really is good reading." A 1970 report on the release of a paperback edition called it whimsical, and "a story the likes of which MacDonald never did before or since. It combines the storytelling talents for which he's famous with an unexpected talent for comedy and farce." Another book columnist said that "to describe the plot would be to discourage readers" and called it a book "that gets the reader laughing out loud, much to the distraction of those near at hand".

It was included as Number 26 in David Pringle's 1988 book, Modern Fantasy: The Hundred Best Novels. Pringle called it, "part sex-comedy, part alarming power-fantasy." He continued, "The love scenes now seem dated and coy, and the pratfalls in the first half of the book come too thick and fast to be truly funny; but the story springs to life in the second half, once the characters enter the enchanted world of the watch."

== Publishing history ==
The first printing of this book was as a paperback original:

- The Girl, the Gold Watch & Everything. Greenwich, Conn.: Gold Medal Books | Fawcett Publications, Inc., 1962. 172 pp. Wrappers. s1259 (35¢). Title page: "an original gold medal book"; copyright page: "First Printing, December 1962."

This book has appeared in at least 24 printings in the United States through June 1991 and, with MacDonald's two other science fiction novels, Wine of the Dreamers (1951) and Ballroom of the Skies (1952), was collected as part of an omnibus in Time and Tomorrow (1980).

The only English-language printing that used "and" instead of an ampersand (&) was the Coronet Books printing published by Hodder Fawcett Ltd. in the United Kingdom (1968).

In addition, the book has appeared in at least one Canadian printing (1964) and four British printings (1964, ca. 1965, 1968, and 1974). The latter book was the first hardcover appearance of the novel.

The Girl, the Gold Watch & Everything has been translated into at least six languages and published in Brazil, France, Germany, Israel, Japan, and Russia.

== Adaptations ==
The novel was adapted directly as a TV movie starring Robert Hays and Pam Dawber, The Girl, the Gold Watch & Everything (1980). The title song was released as a 45-rpm record by Richie Havens on the Elektra label.

The TV movie was successful enough to inspire a sequel based on the original characters, The Girl, the Gold Watch and Dynamite (1981).

== Parodies, pastiches, and allusions ==
A similar plot line – a man stopping time – already appeared in 1955 in Roger Lee Vernon's story "The Stop Watch", included in the collection The Space Frontiers. Vernon treated the theme far more seriously, with his protagonist using the device to commit crimes with impunity and win the Third World War all by himself, and finally suffering a terrible perdition.

MacDonald's plot device, the watch that stopped time, was incorporated into Lady Slings the Booze (1992) by Spider Robinson, who included MacDonald in his acknowledgments.

MacDonald's Travis McGee alludes to the title in The Quick Red Fox (1964), by saying, "You could have had the girl, the gold ring, and everything."

The title was parodied – apparently with the permission of Gold Medal Books – in The Girls, the Massage, & Everything (1973) by Bernhardt J. Hurwood.

A similar plot device is used in the Twilight Zone episode, "A Kind of a Stopwatch", as well as in the 1985 Twilight Zone episode "A Little Peace and Quiet".

A trainman's watch that was cursed by the devil appeared in the television show Friday the 13th: The Series episode "13 O'Clock", in which the user must commit a murder and then stand in a certain train station (the original owner was a switcher for that station who had been fired for drinking on the job and vowed revenge) at 1 a.m., at which point time would stop for precisely one hour. Unlike MacDonald's novel, objects were not frozen with inertia and responded to physical forces like gravity normally, and if contact with another person was maintained when time froze they were included in the frozen hour. The villain lost possession of the watch just prior to 1 a.m. and was consequently frozen in time while the rest of the world remained active.

Stephen King often alludes to the title in his time-travel novel, 11/22/63.

== See also ==
- Ballroom of the Skies
- Wine of the Dreamers
