= Shatterday (short story collection) =

Short story collection by Harlan Ellison

- First edition
- Author: Harlan Ellison
- Cover artist: Leo and Diane Dillon
- Language: English
- Genre: Speculative fiction
- Publisher: Houghton Mifflin
- Publication date: 1980
- Publication place: United States
- Media type: Print (Hardcover)
- Pages: 332 pp
- ISBN: 0-395-28587-9

Shatterday is a collection of short stories by American author Harlan Ellison. In the introduction, Ellison states that the stories reflect an underlying theme of fear of human frailty and ugliness. His goal, he writes, is to shock his readers into seeing that this fear unifies all people. Each story has an introduction, ranging from a single sentence to several pages long.

Among the stories in the collection, "Jeffty Is Five" won both a Nebula Award and a Hugo Award. It was also voted in a 1999 online poll of Locus readers to be the best short story of all time. "All the Lies that Are My Life" had been previously published the same year as a novella. The title story was made into the first episode of the 1985 revival of The Twilight Zone. Other stories have been reprinted in omnibus collections such as The Essential Ellison: a 35-Year Retrospective and Dreams With Sharp Teeth.

== Contents ==
- Introduction: Mortal Dreads
- "Jeffty Is Five"
- "How's the Night Life on Cissalda?"
- "Flop Sweat"
- "Would You Do it For a Penny?" (written in collaboration with Haskell Barkin)
- "The Man Who Was Heavily Into Revenge"
- "Shoppe Keeper"
- "All the Lies That Are My Life"
- "Django"
- "Count the Clock That Tells the Time"
- "In the Fourth Year of the War"
- "Alive and Well on a Friendless Voyage"
- "All the Birds Come Home to Roost"
- "Opium"
- "The Other Eye of Polyphemus"
- "The Executioner of the Malformed Children"
- "Shatterday"
