= Hostile Ambient Takeover =

Studio album by Melvins
- Released: April 16, 2002
- Genres: Sludge metal, noise rock, electronic
- Length: 46:23
- Label: Ipecac
- Producer: Toshi Kasai

Melvins chronology
Millennium Monsterwork 2000 (2002)	Hostile Ambient Takeover (2002)	Melvinmania: Best of the Atlantic Years 1993–1996 (2003)

Singles from Hostile Ambient Takeover
- 1. "Black Stooges" / "Foaming (Fast Version)" Released: 2003; 2. "Dr. Geek" Released: 2003; 3. "Little Judas Chongo" Released: 2003; 4. "The Fool, The Meddling Idiot" Released: 2003; 5. "The Brain Center at Whipples" Released: 2003; 6. "Foaming" Released: 2003; 7. "The Anti-Vermin Seed" Released: 2003

Professional ratings
Review scores
Source	Rating
AllMusic	3/5 stars
Blender	3/5 stars
Pitchfork	(5.6/10)
Rolling Stone	(mixed)

Hostile Ambient Takeover is the fourteenth studio album by the Melvins, released in 2002 through Ipecac Recordings.

Each song was released as a limited 7" vinyl single (limited to 2,500 copies each) that included exclusive B-sides, which are mostly covers (except for "The Anti-Vermin Seed" which was split up onto both sides of its single).

== Track listing ==
All songs written by Buzz Osborne except where noted.

No.	Title	Writer(s)	Length
1.	"Black Stooges"	Crover, Osborne	0:31
2.	Untitled		5:58
3.	"Dr. Geek"		2:35
4.	"Little Judas Chongo"		2:03
5.	"The Fool, the Meddling Idiot"		7:49
6.	"The Brain Center at Whipples"		3:50
7.	"Foaming"	Rutmanis, Osborne	7:47
8.	"The Anti-Vermin Seed"		15:51

== Singles ==
=== Vol. 1 ===
No.	Title	Length
1.	"Black Stooges"	6:05
2.	"Foaming (Fast Version)"	1:55

=== Vol. 2 ===
No.	Title	Length
1.	"Dr. Geek"	2:41
2.	"Return of the Spiders (Alice Cooper cover)"	3:07

=== Vol. 3 ===
No.	Title	Length
1.	"Little Judas Chongo"	2:02
2.	"Jerkin' Krokus (Mott the Hoople cover)"	2:56

=== Vol. 4 ===
No.	Title	Length
1.	"The Fool, The Meddling Idiot"	7:24
2.	"Promise Me (The Gun Club cover)"	3:14

=== Vol. 5 ===
No.	Title	Length
1.	"The Brain Center at Whipples"	3:44
2.	"Today Your Love, Tomorrow the World (Ramones cover)"	3:17

=== Vol. 6 ===
No.	Title	Length
1.	"Foaming"	7:54
2.	"Arny (Warlock Pinchers cover) / White Punks on Dope (The Tubes cover)"	3:12

=== Vol. 7 ===
No.	Title	Length
1.	"The Anti-Vermin Seed"	6:35
2.	"The Anti-Vermin Seed"	6:36

== Personnel ==
- Dale Crover – drums, vocals, keyboards
- Kevin "Rutmanis" – bass, slide bass
- King Buzzo – vocals, guitar

with

- Sir David Scott Stone – thunder sheet, electric wire
- Adam Jones – virus

=== Additional personnel ===
- Toshi Kasai – engineer, mixing, keyboards
- John Golden – mastering
- Mackie Osborne – art direction, design
- Kevin Willis – photography
