= The Grave (The Twilight Zone) =

- The Twilight Zone episode
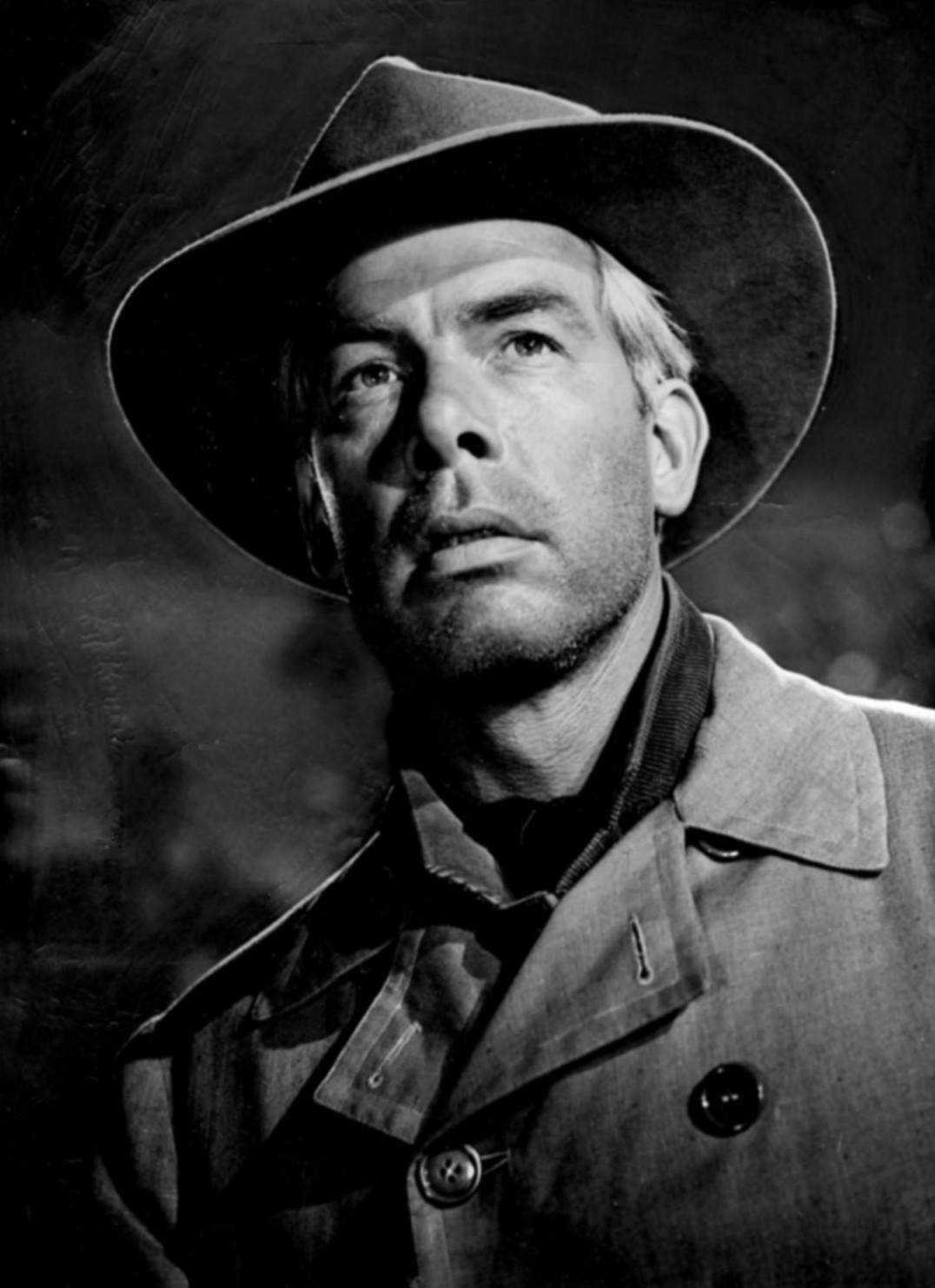
- Lee Marvin as Conny Miller
- Episode no.: Season 3 Episode 7
- Directed by: Montgomery Pittman
- Written by: Montgomery Pittman
- Production code: 3656
- Original air date: October 27, 1961

Guest appearances
- Lee Marvin; Lee Van Cleef; James Best; Strother Martin; Stafford Repp; Elen Willard

Episode chronology
← Previous "The Mirror"	Next → "It's a Good Life"
- The Twilight Zone (1959 TV series) (season 3)

"The Grave" is episode 72 of the American television anthology series The Twilight Zone. It originally aired on October 27, 1961 on CBS. This is one of two episodes that were filmed during season two but held over for broadcast until season three, the other being "Nothing in the Dark".

== Opening narration ==
Normally, the old man would be correct. This would be the end of the story. We've had the traditional shoot-out on the street and the bad man will soon be dead. But some men of legend and folk tale have been known to continue having their way even after death. The outlaw and killer Pinto Sykes was such a person, and shortly we'll see how he introduces the town and a man named Conny Miller, in particular, to the Twilight Zone.

== Plot ==
An outlaw named Pinto Sykes is ambushed and killed by the men of a small town in the Old West. Sometime later, gunfighter Conny Miller, who had been hired to track down Sykes, arrives in town. He goes to the saloon where the men who hired him are gathered and is angry to learn that they had killed Sykes themselves. Moreover, on his deathbed Sykes accused Miller of being a coward, saying he had waited for Miller in Albuquerque, New Mexico and even sent word of where he was, and threatened to reach up from his grave and grab Miller if the latter ever approached it.

Miller says that Sykes was a liar, claiming he went to Albuquerque and found no sign that Sykes had ever been there, and also denies that he is at all frightened by Sykes' threat of vengeance from beyond the grave. After Sykes' sister Ione confronts Miller, the men say they are not convinced of Miller's story, openly admitting they themselves are frightened of Sykes. Two of them bet Miller $20 apiece that he is too scared to visit the grave, giving him a knife and telling him to drive it into the earth there as proof of his visit. Miller accepts the terms and departs into the cold, windy night; he reaches the grave at midnight and plants the knife as instructed, but as he attempts to leave, he is suddenly pulled back down.

When Miller fails to return the next day, Ione and the townsmen travel to the cemetery in search of him. They find him lying dead atop Sykes' grave, the knife driven through his coattail and pinning him to the ground. One man theorizes that Miller had not buttoned his coat and that the wind blew its tail over the grave; after planting the knife, Miller mistook the pinned tail for Sykes' grasping hand and died of fright. However, Ione demonstrates that the wind direction that night would have blown Miller's coattail away from the grave, not over it, and then laughs mockingly at the stupefied men as her cloak blows in a manner similar to that of the Grim Reaper.

== Closing narration ==
Final comment: you take this with a grain of salt or a shovelful of earth, as shadow or substance, we leave it up to you. And for any further research, check under 'G,' for 'ghosts'...in the Twilight Zone.

== Cast ==
- Lee Marvin as Conny Miller
- James Best as Johnny Rob
- Strother Martin as Mothershed
- Elen Willard as Ione Sykes
- Lee Van Cleef as Steinhart
- William Challee as Jason
- Stafford Repp as Ira Broadly
- Larry Johns as Townsman
- Dick Geary as Pinto Sykes

== Bibliography ==
- DeVoe, Bill. (2008). Trivia from The Twilight Zone. Albany, GA: Bear Manor Media. ISBN 978-1-59393-136-0
- Grams, Martin. (2008). The Twilight Zone: Unlocking the Door to a Television Classic. Churchville, MD: OTR Publishing. ISBN 978-0-9703310-9-0
- Ross, Leonard Q. "The Path Through the Cemetery." Saturday Review of Literature.; 29 Nov 1941, Vol. 24, pg. 12; ISSN 0147-5932.
- Leach, Maria (1978). The Thing at the Foot of the Bed and Other Scary Tales (First ed.). Cleveland, OH: The World Publishing Company. ISBN 978-04404-877-39.
