= How's the Night Life on Cissalda? =

Science fiction short story by Harlan Ellison

"How's the Night Life on Cissalda?" is a science fiction short story by American writer Harlan Ellison, first published in 1977, in the first volume of the Zebra Books anthology series "Chrysalis". It was subsequently reprinted in Ellison's 1980 collection Shatterday, in OpZone no. 8 (1980, French language, as "Et comment sont les nuits sur Cissalda?") in the 1990 Ellen Datlow-edited anthology Alien Sex, and, in Italian (as "Vita notturna a Cissalda"), in Fantasex (the 1993 translation into Italian of Alien Sex) and in Idrogeno e idiozia (the 1999 translation into Italian of Shatterday).

Two illustrated versions have been published: one with art by Tom Barber, in Heavy Metal in November 1977; and one with art by Eric White and an adapted script by Faye Perozich, in the Dark Horse Comics-published Harlan Ellison's Dream Corridor, in August 1995.

== Synopsis ==
Disgusting alien monstrosities from another universe are revealed to be the perfect sex partners for humanity, both collectively and individually.

== Reception ==
Mike Ashley states that it is "the most audacious sf sex story yet written", and "refreshing and challenging," while Gary K. Wolfe says it is one of Ellison's "better comic tales" and People called it "wickedly witty". Conversely, Paul Kincaid considers it to be "the single worst story in (Shatterday)", stating that it is proof that "Ellison can't do comedy", and that the humor in "Cissalda" is "broad, crude (not in the sense of being rude but in the sense of being unsophisticated), repetitive and not at all funny," while Gwyneth Jones describes it as "a one-liner (...) long past its best by date."
