= The Encounter (The Twilight Zone) =

- The Twilight Zone episode
- Episode no.: Season 5 Episode 31
- Directed by: Robert Butler
- Written by: Martin M. Goldsmith
- Production code: 2640
- Original air date: May 1, 1964

Guest appearances
- Neville Brand: Fenton; George Takei: Arthur Takamori/Taro

Episode chronology
← Previous "Stopover in a Quiet Town"	Next → "Mr. Garrity and the Graves"
- The Twilight Zone (1959 TV series) (season 5)

"The Encounter" is episode 151 of the American television series The Twilight Zone. First broadcast on May 1, 1964, its racial overtones caused it to be withheld from syndication in the U.S. until 2016. It is the only original episode pulled from syndication.

== Opening narration ==
Two men alone in an attic, a young Japanese-American and a seasoned veteran of yesterday's war. It's twenty odd years since Pearl Harbor, but two ancient opponents are moving into position for a battle in an attic crammed with skeletons, souvenirs, mementos, old uniforms, and rusted medals. Ghosts from the dim reaches of the past, that will lead us into the Twilight Zone.

== Plot ==
Digging through his attic, an American World War II veteran named Fenton finds an old katana. A young Japanese American named Arthur Takamori comes in looking for work, on a tip from a neighbor. Fenton is gruff yet cordial, and invites Takamori to share a beer with him in his cluttered attic. Fenton makes a remark about the incongruity between his first name and his obvious ethnicity. Arthur takes offense at first. But when it becomes apparent that Fenton meant no harm, he admits that he changed his name from Taro. Fenton shows Takamori the sword and says he took it off a Japanese soldier whom he killed during the war 20 years earlier. When Fenton leaves to fetch more beer, Takamori takes hold of the sword and says to himself in an astonished way "I'm going to kill him. I'm going to kill him. Why?"

Fenton says he has repeatedly tried to sell, give away, or throw out the sword, but it always comes back. He has had the inscription on it translated: "The sword will avenge me". Seemingly despite himself, Fenton sometimes speaks in a racially offensive manner, such as addressing Takamori as "boy." But he often apologizes for it and says he was "just kidding around". Still, Takamori grows more uneasy and more confrontational to match Fenton's increasing hostility. They have brief heated exchanges that cool but then reemerge. While recounting how he got the sword, Fenton appears to suffer a post-traumatic flashback. They assume an adversarial posture, and Takamori challenges Fenton with the sword. This tension, too, subsides, though Takamori, seeming to gain some kind of supernatural insight from the sword, says Fenton killed the Japanese soldier after the soldier surrendered. Fenton challenges the accusation, but then admits to it while saying he was acting under orders to not take prisoners. Intensely uneasy now, Takamori tries to leave but the door to the attic won't open for either him or Fenton, even though it doesn't have a lock.

In response to an insult from Fenton, Takamori describes his experience as a small child at Pearl Harbor. His father was a construction foreman who helped build the harbor. Takamori watched as the planes bombed the harbor, and his father with it. He first states his father tried to alert sailors to the attack, but then confesses that his father was actually a traitor who directed where the planes should drop the bombs. Seeing Takamori's guilt, Fenton tries to offer some comfort. The sword, however, appears to be dictating the course of the conversation, and soon Takamori accuses Fenton of being a murderer because he killed an unarmed man. Fenton defends himself by saying his orders were to take no prisoners.

In a sudden depression, Fenton admits that he is unhappy with himself and what he has done. He has lost his job, his wife is leaving him, he is consumed with hostility and bigotry, and he coaxed Takamori into conversation because he does not want to be left alone. But Takamori, now thoroughly under the controlling influence of the sword, poises to kill Fenton. Fenton seizes him by his sword arm and overpowers him, and the samurai sword is dropped, wedging into the table supports, pointing upward. Going down to the floor to retrieve it, Fenton is then fatally impaled on the sword when Takamori pulls at his feet. Takamori takes the sword, shrieks "Banzai!" and jumps out the attic window, presumably to his death.

Moments later, the first-floor door slowly opens on its own.

== Closing narration ==
Two men in an attic, locked in mortal embrace. Their common bond, and their common enemy: guilt. A disease all too prevalent amongst men both in and out of The Twilight Zone.

== Bibliography ==
- DeVoe, Bill. (2008). Trivia from The Twilight Zone. Albany, GA: Bear Manor Media. ISBN 978-1-59393-136-0
- Grams, Martin. (2008). The Twilight Zone: Unlocking the Door to a Television Classic. Churchville, MD: OTR Publishing. ISBN 978-0-9703310-9-0
- Zicree, Mark Scott. (1982). The Twilight Zone Companion. New York, NY: Bantam Books, Inc. ISBN 0-553-01416-1
