= The Girl, the Gold Watch & Dynamite =

- Genre: Fantasy; Comedy
- Written by: John D. MacDonald (characters); George Zateslo
- Directed by: Hy Averback
- Starring: Philip MacHale; Lee Purcell
- Music by: Bruce Broughton
- Country of origin: United States
- Original language: English

Production
- Executive producers: Arthur Fellows; Terry Keegan
- Producer: John Cutts
- Production locations: Auburn Hotel - 853 Lincoln Way, Auburn, California; Sacramento, California
- Cinematography: William K. Jurgensen
- Editor: Kenneth R. Koch
- Running time: 93 minutes
- Production companies: Paramount Television; Fellows-Keegan Company

Original release
- Release: May 21, 1981

The Girl, the Gold Watch & Dynamite is a 1981 American made-for-television fantasy-comedy film starring Philip MacHale and Lee Purcell. The film is a sequel to the 1980 telefilm The Girl, the Gold Watch & Everything which was an adaptation of the John D. MacDonald novel The Girl, the Gold Watch & Everything. The original sequel title was going to be "The Girl, the Gold Watch, and Everything Else", but was eventually dropped for the punchier "....and Dynamite" to draw more of a distinction between the original movie and the sequel.

== Plot ==
A couple have a gold watch that has the power to stop time. Kirby Winter and his fiancée Bonnie Lee Beaumont try to save her family farm from a land developer.

== Cast ==
- Lee Purcell as Bonnie Lee Beaumont
- Philip MacHale as Kirby Winter
- Burton Gilliam as Hoover Hess III
- Zohra Lampert as Wilma Farnham
- Jack Elam as Seth Beaumont
- Gary Lockwood as Sheriff Earl Baker
- Jerry Mathers as Deputy Henry Thomas Watts
- Richie Havens as Amos
- Barney Phillips as Old Farmer
- Lyle Alzado as Mamie
- Carol Lawrence as Sarah Ann Beaumont
- Tom Poston as Omar Krepps
- Larry Linville as Wesley Reins
- Morgan Fairchild as Stella Walker
- Gene Barry as Andrew Stovall

== Reception ==
The film got 2.5 out of 5 on AllMovie.
