= Ballroom of the Skies =

1952 novel by John D. MacDonald

- First edition
- Author: John D. MacDonald
- Language: English
- Genre: Science fiction
- Publisher: Greenberg
- Publication date: 1952
- Publication place: United States
- Media type: Print

Ballroom of the Skies is a 1952 science fiction novel by American writer John D. MacDonald. Though MacDonald was primarily a mystery novelist famed for his Travis McGee series, he did write some science fiction short stories and novels. Other titles include Wine of the Dreamers (1951) and The Girl, the Gold Watch & Everything (1962).

== Plot summary ==
The story involves Earth sometime after World War III, with Brazil, Iran, and India as the prevailing superpowers. The plot reveals the reasons behind humanity's history of perpetual war and strife, which is that leaders of an intergalactic empire are always chosen from among humans but must first be tested by extreme hardship.

== Critical reception ==
In a 1953 review, The New York Times said that "..if the novel is at times implausible, it is certainly never dull." Galaxy reviewer Groff Conklin described Ballroom as "an exciting and effective alien invasion novel." In F&SF, Boucher and McComas described Ballroom as "an admirably conceived suspense-melodrama with a fine new Fortean surprise," although they faulted the text's "unpolished first-draft form."

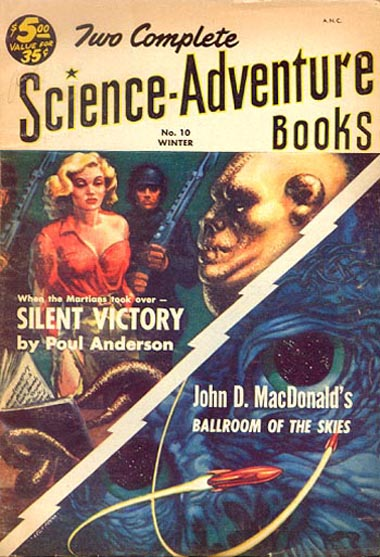
Ballroom of the Skies was reprinted in Two Complete Science-Adventure Books in 1953, but no paperback edition appeared until 1968.
