= Caesar and Me =

- The Twilight Zone episode
- Episode no.: Season 5 Episode 28
- Directed by: Robert Butler
- Written by: Adele T. Strassfield
- Production code: 2636
- Original air date: April 10, 1964

Guest appearances
- Jackie Cooper; Morgan Brittany; Sarah Selby; Stafford Repp; Don Gazzaniga; Kenneth Konopka; Olan Soule

Episode chronology
← Previous "Sounds and Silences"	Next → "The Jeopardy Room"
- The Twilight Zone (1959 TV series) (season 5)

"Caesar and Me" is episode 148 of the American television anthology series The Twilight Zone starring Jackie Cooper as a ventriloquist. It is not to be confused with a similar episode "The Dummy", starring Cliff Robertson as a ventriloquist.

== Opening narration ==
Jonathan West, ventriloquist, a master of voice manipulation. A man, late of Ireland, with a talent for putting words into other peoples' mouths. In this case, the other person is a dummy, aptly named Caesar, a small splinter with large ideas, a wooden tyrant with a mind and a voice of his own, who is about to talk Jonathan West—into the Twilight Zone.

== Plot ==
Jonathan West is an unsuccessful Irish ventriloquist. He is perpetually broke, selling valuable keepsakes like his grandfather's watch to pawnbrokers in exchange for petty cash. At the boarding house where he lives, he is mercilessly taunted by a little girl, Susan, for failing to find a job. But unbeknownst to everyone, Jonathan's ventriloquist dummy, "Little Caesar", has a criminal mind of his own and talks to him at will. Despite Jonathan's reassurances that they are on the verge of a big break, Caesar apathetically tells him that they have hit bottom.

When Jonathan and Caesar go to a nightclub for an audition, the performance is poorly received. The following day, Jonathan is unable to find employment because of his lack of vocational experience and his immigrant status; he may soon leave the boarding house because he is behind on his rent. Caesar berates Jonathan for being a hopeless "clod", but has a solution to his money woes: burglary. A reluctant Jonathan—directed by Caesar in his suitcase—breaks into a delicatessen and steals its money. Jonathan uses it to pay his rent, but Caesar, during a conversation overheard by Susan, pressures him into committing more burglaries.

Susan—now aware that Caesar can talk—sneaks into Jonathan's room in his absence to unsuccessfully speak with the dummy. Jonathan catches her coming out of the room and runs her off. Inside, Jonathan expresses a desire to flee, but Caesar cajoles him into carrying out the next burglary. The duo sneaks into the nightclub to break into the manager's office. However, they are caught by a night watchman after they steal money from the nightclub's safe. They manage to bluff their way past him by giving an impromptu routine.

When Jonathan and Caesar arrive home, Susan eavesdrops on their ensuing argument. The next morning over breakfast, Susan hears her aunt, Mrs. Cudahy, read about the nightclub theft from a newspaper. She calls the police to tip them off about Jonathan and Caesar. Two detectives arrive at the boarding house and interrogate Jonathan, who tries to make Caesar talk about his role in the crime. The dummy, however, remains silent. Mrs. Cudahy and the detectives stare at the one-sided exchange, thinking Jonathan mad. Jonathan now realizes that Caesar has abandoned him and is willingly arrested.

After the detectives lead Jonathan out of the room, Caesar turns his head around and addresses Susan, who lingered and is the last to leave. She triumphantly tells him she knew all the time he could speak. He says he likes her for her "hip attitude" and offers to help her run away to New York City. Caesar assures Susan that Jonathan will now be gone "a long, long time" and that the two of them are now "a team". Finally, Caesar hints Susan should kill her aunt with poison darts. She says nothing and smiles.

== Closing narration ==
A little girl and a wooden doll. A lethal dummy in the shape of a man. But everybody knows dummies can't talk—unless, of course, they learn their vocabulary in the Twilight Zone.

== Cast ==
- Jackie Cooper as Jonathan West / voice of Caesar
- Suzanne Cupito (Morgan Brittany) as Susan (credited as Susanne Cupito)
- Sarah Selby as Mrs. Cudahy
- Stafford Repp as Pawnbroker
- Don Gazzaniga as Detective
- Kenneth Konopka as Mr. Miller
- Sidney Marion as Watchman
- Robert McCord as Man Watching Audition
- Olan Soule as Mr. Smiles

== Production notes ==
The writer of the episode, Adele Strassfield, was the secretary of William Froug, the producer of the second half of the final season of The Twilight Zone. According to Froug, they worked out this episode together. Strassfield is billed in the credits as "Adele T. Strassfield", not "A.T. Strassfield" as Zicree inexplicably avers in The Twilight Zone Companion; Serling also announced her as "Adele T. Strassfield" in a promotional announcement for the episode that aired the previous week. Strassfield is the only woman credited with writing an original teleplay for the original version of The Twilight Zone, though several women received credit for stories that were adapted for the show. She later wrote a first-season episode of Gilligan's Island with executive producer Froug's assistance.

The dummy used in this episode to portray "Caesar" was originally created in the 1940s by puppet maker Revello Petee. The same dummy was used one year earlier in the 1962 Twilight Zone episode, "The Dummy". A figure of the puppet can be seen at Disney's Hollywood Studios in the dark corner of a barred-off exhibit to the side of one of the elevator exits of the Twilight Zone Tower of Terror ride.

== See also ==
- The Great Gabbo, a 1929 film about a mad ventriloquist, starring Erich von Stroheim
- Dead of Night, a 1945 anthology film featuring a mad ventriloquist segment
- Magic, a 1978 film starring Anthony Hopkins and Ann-Margret about a ventriloquist whose delusion leads him to commit murders at what he imagines to be the behest of his dummy, "Fats"
- Slappy the Living Dummy, a recurring character in novels and films with an appearance similar to Caesar's
- The Ventriloquist and Scarface, a villain in the Batman comic book series
