= The Last Night of a Jockey =

- The Twilight Zone episode
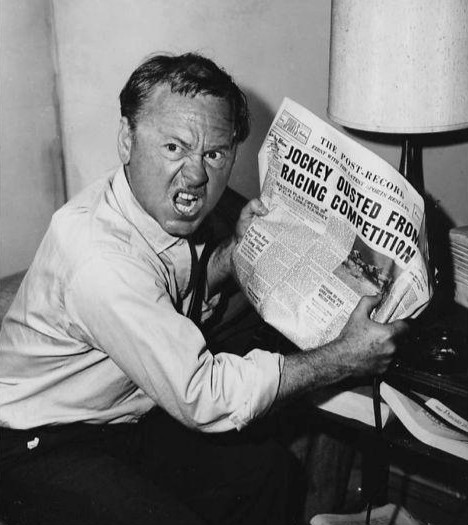
- Mickey Rooney in "The Last Night of a Jockey"
- Episode no.: Season 5 Episode 5
- Directed by: Joseph M. Newman
- Written by: Rod Serling
- Production code: 2616
- Original air date: October 25, 1963

Guest appearance
- Mickey Rooney

Episode chronology
← Previous "A Kind of a Stopwatch"	Next → "Living Doll"
- The Twilight Zone (1959 TV series) (season 5)

"The Last Night of a Jockey" is an episode of the American television anthology series The Twilight Zone. In this episode, a diminutive jockey's wish to be a big man is granted. Rod Serling wrote the episode specifically for Mickey Rooney, who is the only actor to appear in it.

== Opening narration ==
The name is Grady, five feet short in stockings and boots, a slightly distorted offshoot of a good breed of humans who race horses. He happens to be one of the rotten apples, bruised and yellowed by dealing in dirt, a short man with a short memory who's forgotten that he's worked for the sport of kings and helped turn it into a cesspool, used and misused by the two-legged animals who've hung around sporting events since the days of the Coliseum. So this is Grady, on his last night as a jockey. Behind him are Hialeah, Hollywood Park and Saratoga. Rounding the far turn and coming up fast on the rail—is the Twilight Zone.

== Plot ==
A jockey named Michael Grady is lying alone in his room after being banned from horse racing for life for fixing races by horse doping. He drinks in his depression, and rues his five-foot height, which horse riding had served to compensate for. He then hears a voice. The voice introduces himself as "the alter ego" and claims to live in Grady's head. He argues with the alter ego, trying to justify his life and his actions, even lying about his crimes, but the alter ego knows all about him. Grady is offered the chance to change his life with one wish. Grady says his greatest wish is to be big. After Grady wakes from a nap he finds his wish has been granted; he is now close to eight feet tall.

Ecstatic, Grady calls his ex-girlfriend over the phone, but she dismisses him. He boasts that he can find more girls who will appreciate him because of his newfound height. The alter ego remains unimpressed, feeling Grady has not made good on any of his promises. He derides his dumb and "cheap" wish, and says that Grady could have wished to win the Kentucky Derby fairly, or perform a heroic act. But all he wanted was “to be a big man”.

A telephone call from the racing commission informs Grady that he has been reinstated and can jockey again. Grady joyfully thanks everyone who petitioned to give him a second chance, but the alter ego laughs at him. Grady realizes he has become even larger, about 10 feet tall — too tall to ride a horse, properly fit in his own apartment or even wear his own clothes. Devastated, the now-giant Grady wrecks his room and pleads with the alter ego to make him small again. The alter ego denies the request, and instead replies, "You are small, Mr. Grady. You see, every time you won an honest race, that's when you were a giant. But right now, they just don't come any smaller."

== Closing narration ==
The name is Grady, ten feet tall, a slightly distorted offshoot of a good breed of humans who race horses. Unfortunately for Mr. Grady, he learned too late that you don't measure size with a ruler, you don't figure height with a yardstick, and you never judge a man by how tall he looks in a mirror. The giant is as he does. You can make a parimutuel bet on this, win, place, or show, in or out - of the Twilight Zone.

== Censorship ==
CBS's Program Practices department criticized this episode for use of the word "dwarf" in a negative context, suggesting that instead the terms "half-pint", "runt" or "shrimp" could be used.

== Mickey Rooney and Rod Serling ==
Although this was Mickey Rooney's sole appearance on The Twilight Zone, he had earlier co-starred in two dramas written by Rod Serling — "The Comedian", a live 1957 episode of the 90-minute anthology series Playhouse 90, as well as the theatrical feature Requiem for a Heavyweight, a 1962 remake of the same-titled 1956 episode of Playhouse 90. The making of the as-yet-unreleased production was the subject of a discussion on the December 21, 1961, episode of the late-night talk show PM East, with guests Mickey Rooney, Rod Serling, and the film's star Anthony Quinn. A decade later, in October 1972, Mickey Rooney co-starred in one additional Rod Serling teleplay — "Rare Objects" — a half-hour episode of the horror anthology series Night Gallery.

== Bibliography ==
- DeVoe, Bill. (2008). Trivia from The Twilight Zone. Albany, GA: Bear Manor Media. ISBN 978-1-59393-136-0
- Grams, Martin. (2008). The Twilight Zone: Unlocking the Door to a Television Classic. Churchville, MD: OTR Publishing. ISBN 978-0-9703310-9-0
- Zicree, Marc Scott: The Twilight Zone Companion. Sillman-James Press, 1982 (second edition)
