= Jeffty Is Five =

- Short story by Harlan Ellison
- Country: United States
- Language: English
- Genre: Fantasy short story

Publication
- Published in: The Magazine of Fantasy & Science Fiction
- Publication type: Periodical
- Media type: Print (magazine, hardback and paperback)
- Publication date: 1977

"Jeffty Is Five" is a fantasy short story by American author Harlan Ellison. It was first published in The Magazine of Fantasy & Science Fiction in 1977, then was included in DAW's The 1978 Annual World's Best SF in 1978 and Ellison's short story collection Shatterday two years later.

According to Ellison, it was partially inspired by a fragment of conversation that he misheard at a party at the home of actor Walter Koenig: "How is Jeff?" "Jeff is fine. He's always fine," which he perceived as "Jeff is five, he's always five."

Ellison based the character of Jeffty on Joshua Andrew Koenig, Walter's son. He declared:

... I had been awed and delighted by Josh Koenig, and I instantly thought of just such a child who was arrested in time at the age of five. Jeffty, in no small measure, is Josh: the sweetness of Josh, the intelligence of Josh, the questioning nature of Josh.

== Plot ==
Jeffty is a boy who never grows past the age of five — physically, mentally, or chronologically. The narrator, Jeffty's friend from the age of five well into adulthood, discovers that Jeffty has the ability to access current versions of popular culture from the narrator's youth. His radio plays all-new episodes of long-canceled serial programs, broadcast by stations that no longer exist. He can buy all-new issues of long-discontinued pulp magazines such as The Shadow and Doc Savage, with all-new stories by long-dead authors such as Stanley G. Weinbaum, Edgar Rice Burroughs, and Robert E. Howard. Jeffty can even watch films that are adaptations of old science fiction novels such as Alfred Bester's The Demolished Man. While Jeffty is cute and has the sweetness and humor of an actual five-year-old, his parents are sad and scared of him.

The narrator takes Jeffty to a local movie house on a Saturday afternoon, but finds the TV store he owns is swamped with customers. He leaves the boy waiting in line for a few minutes while he helps out his staff. Jeffty borrows a portable radio from some teens in line and tunes in a radio show from the past. When Jeffty is unable to return the radio to its normal setting, the teenagers beat him badly. The narrator takes the boy home, but Jeffty's parents are unwilling to act. The narrator gives the boy to his mother, who takes him upstairs to bathe his wounds. It is implied that she kills Jeffty via electrocution (using a radio near the bathtub as a temptation for her son), so that she and her husband can resume normal lives.

The narrator, robbed of his and Jeffty's connection to the past, desperately begs the reader to tell him that living in the present is worth it.

== Reception ==
"Jeffty Is Five" won the 1977 Nebula Award for Best Short Story and the 1978 Hugo Award for Best Short Story, and was nominated for the 1978 World Fantasy Award—Short Fiction. It was also voted in a 1999 online poll of Locus readers as the best short story of all time.

Publishers Weekly called it "touching but scary", and Tor.com called it "heartbreaking", while at the SF Site, Paul Kincaid described it as "a wonder of sustained nostalgia coupled with despair at the modern world", but noted that it "only really succeeds because of the tragedy of [its] ending."
