= The Jeopardy Room =

- The Twilight Zone episode
- Episode no.: Season 5 Episode 29
- Directed by: Richard Donner
- Written by: Rod Serling
- Production code: 2639
- Original air date: April 17, 1964

Guest appearances
- Martin Landau as Major Ivan Kuchenko; John van Dreelen as Commissar Vassiloff; Robert Kelljan as Boris, Vassiloff’s assistant

Episode chronology
← Previous "Caesar and Me"	Next → "Stopover in a Quiet Town"
- The Twilight Zone (1959 TV series) (season 5)

"The Jeopardy Room" is episode 149 of the American television anthology series The Twilight Zone, which originally aired on April 17, 1964, on CBS. It is one of the few Twilight Zone episodes to feature no supernatural or sci-fi elements.

== Opening narration ==
The cast of characters—a cat and a mouse, this is the latter. The intended victim who may or may not know that he is to die, be it by butchery or ballet. His name is Major Ivan Kuchenko. He has, if events go according to certain plans, perhaps three or four more hours of living. But an ignorance shared by both himself and his executioner, is of the fact that both of them have taken the first step into the Twilight Zone.

== Plot ==
Major Ivan Kuchenko, an escaped political prisoner who is attempting to defect, is trapped inside a hotel room in an unnamed, politically neutral country. Commissar Vassiloff, a hitman, and Boris, his assistant, are watching Kuchenko from a room across the street. Vassiloff, who considers himself an artist, has an elaborate plan for Kuchenko's assassination. After Vassiloff tricks Kuchenko into drinking a sleeping drug, Kuchenko awakes to find a taped recording from Vassiloff in which he explains that he has booby-trapped an object in the room. If Kuchenko finds and disarms the object within three hours, he will be allowed to live; if he tries to leave the room before then or turn out the lights, he will be shot by Boris, an expert sniper.

Vassiloff tells Boris he has hidden a lethal bomb in the telephone, but it will be triggered only by picking up an incoming call. Thus, when Kuchenko picks up the phone without it ringing, nothing happens. Kuchenko grows increasingly nervous and desperate as the ordeal continues, even begging Vassiloff to shoot him at one point. With ten minutes of time left, Vassiloff places a call to Kuchenko's room. Kuchenko puts his hand on the receiver, but hesitates. When Vassiloff tries to call him a second time, Kuchenko bolts out of the hotel room, narrowly escaping a spray of bullets from Boris. Later, Vassiloff and Boris enter the room to dispose of evidence. The telephone rings, and Boris and Vassiloff are both killed after Boris unthinkingly answers it. On the other end of the line is Ivan Kuchenko, calling from a phone booth at the airport. The operator tells him she is unable to reach his party, but Kuchenko states, "It’s all right, operator. I ... I have reached them.” He then leaves to board a plane flying to New York City, as Vassiloff and Boris are shown lying dead amidst the rubble of Kuchenko's room.

== Closing narration ==
Major Ivan Kuchenko, on his way West. On his way to freedom: a freedom bought and paid for by a most stunning ingenuity. And exit one Commissar Vassiloff, who forgot that there are two sides to an argument - and two parties on the line. This has been - the Twilight Zone.

== Cast ==
- Martin Landau as Major Ivan Kuchenko
- John van Dreelen as Commissar Vassiloff
- Bob Kelljan (credited Robert Kelljan) as Boris
- Rod Serling as Narrator/himself

== See also ==
- Payback, a 1999 film that features a similar booby trap as a plot device and a similar twist ending.
