= Mr. Garrity and the Graves =

- The Twilight Zone episode
- Episode no.: Season 5 Episode 32
- Directed by: Ted Post
- Story by: Mike Korologos
- Teleplay by: Rod Serling
- Production code: 2637
- Original air date: May 8, 1964

Guest appearances
- John Dehner; J. Pat O'Malley; Stanley Adams; John Mitchum; Percy Helton; Norman Leavitt; Edgar Dearing; Kate Murtagh; Patrick O'Moore; John Cliff; Robert McCord; Cosmo Sardo

Episode chronology
← Previous "The Encounter"	Next → "The Brain Center at Whipple's"
- The Twilight Zone (1959 TV series) (season 5)

"Mr. Garrity and the Graves" is an episode of the American anthology television series The Twilight Zone.

== Opening narration ==
Introducing Mr. Jared Garrity, a gentleman of commerce, who in the latter half of the nineteenth century plied his trade in the wild and wooly hinterlands of the American West. And Mr. Garrity, if one can believe him, is a resurrecter of the dead - which, on the face of it, certainly sounds like the bull is off the nickel. But to the scoffers amongst you, and you ladies and gentlemen from Missouri, don't laugh this one off entirely, at least until you've seen a sample of Mr. Garrity's wares, and an example of his services. The place is Happiness, Arizona, the time about 1890. And you and I have just entered a saloon where the bar whiskey is brewed, bottled and delivered from the Twilight Zone.

== Plot ==
In the year 1890, a traveling peddler named Jared Garrity arrives in the little recently renamed town of Happiness, Arizona, offering to bring the townsfolk's dead back from Boot Hill. Initially, they do not believe him, but, when he appears to resurrect a dead dog struck by a traveler's horse-drawn wagon, they believe him.

After performing the resurrection ritual, Garrity, in seemingly casual conversation, reminds the people about the dead and departed, almost all of whom were murdered: who died having a score to settle with whom and so forth. The townsfolk grow uncomfortable at the thought of facing problems they thought buried with the dead. When one apparent resurrectee is seen approaching town, a man believes him to be his brother whom he himself had shot, so the man bribes Garrity to reverse the ritual and the figure vanishes. Ultimately, everyone in town similarly pays Garrity to not revive their "loved ones".

Later that night, Garrity and his assistant Ace (who was both wagon driver and "resurrectee") ride away with the money, joking about how they cannot actually bring the dead back to life: they had simply performed a few smoke and mirrors tricks to con the townsfolk and used a dog that was alive the whole time, but simply knew how to play dead.

After they have left the town, the last scene reveals that the dead really are rising from the grave, with one commenting that the peddler underestimates his own ability. One revived person is looking forward to getting back into town to get caught up on his drinking. A revived criminal has unfinished business with the sheriff. A woman named Zelda Gooberman plans to break her husband's arm for what she sees in him. As Garrity continues to ride away from Happiness, Arizona, the final shot shows the deserted Boot Hill cemetery.

== Closing narration ==
Exit Mr. Garrity, a would-be charlatan, a make-believe con man and a sad misjudger of his own talents. Respectfully submitted from an empty cemetery on a dark hillside that is one of the slopes leading to the Twilight Zone.

== Cast ==
- John Dehner as Jared Garrity
- J. Pat O'Malley as Mr. Gooberman
- Stanley Adams as Jensen
- John Mitchum as Ace
- Percy Helton as Lapham
- Norman Leavitt as Sheriff Gilchrist
- Edgar Dearing as First Resurrected Man
- Kate Murtagh as Zelda Gooberman
- Patrick O'Moore as Man
- John Cliff as Lightning Peterson
- Robert McCord as Townsman in Black Hat
- Cosmo Sardo as Resurrected Man

== Production ==
The story was based on an 1873 incident in Alta, Utah, in which a stranger arrived in the mining town and offered to raise the dead. Initially optimistic, residents reconsidered after reflecting on the potential complications to those who had inherited property, and those who had remarried after their spouses died. They collected $2,500 (equivalent to $67,188 in 2025) to persuade the stranger to leave town without following through on his offer. Sportswriter Mike Korologos read about the incident in the American Guide Series, and wrote about it for a 1963 article in The Salt Lake Tribune. The Alta Ski Area reprinted his article the following winter in their newsletter, where Serling read it while visiting the resort.
