= Wine of the Dreamers =

1951 novel by John D. MacDonald

- First edition cover
- Author: John D. MacDonald
- Language: English
- Genre: Science fiction
- Publisher: Greenberg
- Publication date: 1951
- Publication place: United States
- Media type: Print
- Pages: 219

Wine of the Dreamers is a 1951 science fiction novel by American writer John D. MacDonald. Wine of the Dreamers was his first science fiction novel and one of his earliest published novels altogether. Though he later also wrote the science fiction novels Ballroom of the Skies and The Girl, the Gold Watch & Everything, MacDonald was primarily a writer of mysteries. A later version was published under the name Planet of the Dreamers before reverting to the original title upon further printings.

The book is set both on Earth (dealing with a top-secret military spaceflight project in an imagined 1975) and a far-away planet of humans able to influence Earth while they sleep, believing that the planet and all its inhabitants are simply part of their dreams that they can toy with. MacDonald described the book as "a symbolic novel of how when original purposes are forgotten, the uses of ritual can be destructive."

Galaxy reviewer Groff Conklin wrote that "The skill and the imagination with which the tale is developed are genuinely satisfying." P. Schuyler Miller found the novel to be "well and smoothly told, with likable characters a bit beyond the cardboard stage."
