= Shatterday =

- The Twilight Zone segment
- Episode no.: Season 1 Episode 1a
- Directed by: Wes Craven
- Written by: Alan Brennert
- Based on: Shatterday by Harlan Ellison
- Original air date: September 27, 1985

Guest appearances
- Bruce Willis as Peter Jay Novins; Dan Gilvezan as Bartender; Murukh as Woman at Bank; John Carlyle as Clerk; Seth Isler as Alter Ego

Episode chronology
← Previous —	Next → "A Little Peace and Quiet"

"Shatterday" is the first segment of the premiere episode of the first season of the television series The Twilight Zone. The story follows a man who finds that a double of himself has moved into his apartment and is taking over his life. The segment is nearly a one-man show for featured actor Bruce Willis; all the other significant characters appear only offscreen.

== Opening narration ==
Some push for what they need; some push for what they want. Some people, like Peter Jay Novins, just push. If they do it hard enough, and long enough, something might just push back... from the Twilight Zone.

== Plot ==
Peter Jay Novins is at a bar and accidentally dials his own home phone number. The phone is answered by someone who claims to be Peter Jay Novins and sounds just like him. Flustered, Peter leaves the bar and uses a phone booth to call his home. He gets himself again and begins to believe that the man on the other end of the line is his doppelganger. Peter thinks about heading over to his apartment, but the man on the phone warns him against it and tells him that because Peter's life is terrible, he is going to change it.

Peter cashes out his bank account, calls the grocery store and insults them to ensure that Peter B (the doppelganger still in the apartment) cannot get food delivered. He hopes this will force Peter B to eventually leave the apartment and allow him to move back in, reclaiming his life. However, Peter B already used the $200 that was stashed away to stock up on groceries. He tells Peter A that he figures that Peter A is a piece of him that wandered off while he was sleeping. Peter A, however, thinks that it's possible that when he went to a friend's lab and a picture of his "aura" was taken, it somehow "stole" something from him.

As days go by, Peter A becomes increasingly sick, while Peter B makes major changes to his life: He patches things up with his estranged mother and invites her to live with him, turns down an unethical advertising job that he had previously accepted, tries to make amends with an ex-girlfriend who left her husband to pursue their affair only for Peter to dump her when he tired of their relationship, and plans to marry his current girlfriend and have children. Peter B visits Peter A's hotel room to finally meet him face to face, telling him that he is being replaced and is becoming a memory. Peter B reveals that things are going well with him and that he has put his life in order—something Peter A failed to do. He asks Peter A if there is anything he would have done differently. He says no. As Peter B leaves, Peter A wishes him well, shakes his hand, and then disappears.

== Closing narration ==
Peter Jay Novins, both victor and victim, of a brief struggle for custody of a man's soul. A man who lost himself, and found himself, on a lonely battlefield, somewhere in the Twilight Zone.

== Production ==
This segment is based on the short story of the same name by Harlan Ellison, which was first published September 1975 in Gallery and later gave its title to a collection of his short stories. The short story uses all seven days of one week: Someday, Moansday, Duesday, Woundsday, Thornsday, Freeday, Shatterday. Ellison got the idea for the story while living in New York City and waiting for his date at a restaurant. His date was running late so he tried calling her up but, distracted by the noise, dialed his own number instead. After several rings he realized his mistake, and was inspired by thoughts of what would happen if he had answered the phone at his house.

Though the teleplay is credited solely to Alan Brennert, the opening scene was scripted by Ellison himself. Brennert had extensively revised the opening scene from the short story, in which Peter Novins almost immediately accepts that the man on the other end of the line is himself, because this would not be believable in television format. Ellison disliked the revisions and, after he rejected six different drafts of the opening scene by Brennert, executive producer Philip DeGuere suggested that he simply script that scene himself. He inserted the line "Alan, is that you? You imitate me better than anyone else!" as a playful homage to Brennert.

During filming of one of the hotel scenes, actor Bruce Willis, in a display of method acting, warmed up for the scene by screaming curses and punching the wall behind the bed. This performance caused him to lose his voice over the course of several takes, and the day's filming had to be halted early.

In the few shots where the two Peters appear on-screen together, the new Peter was played by Willis, while the old Peter was played by a body double.

== Syndication ==
This episode was shown as a stand-alone half-hour episode in syndication on the Chiller TV network instead of one segment from the original hour-long episode.
