= The Girl, the Gold Watch & Everything (film) =

- Genre: Science fiction comedy
- Based on: The Girl, the Gold Watch & Everything by John D. MacDonald
- Written by: George Zateslo
- Directed by: William Wiard
- Starring: Robert Hays; Pam Dawber; Zohra Lampert; Jill Ireland; Ed Nelson; Maurice Evans
- Music by: Hod David Schudson
- Country of origin: United States
- Original language: English

Production
- Executive producers: Arthur Fellows; Terry Keegan
- Producer: Myrl A. Schreibman
- Cinematography: Jacques Haitkin
- Editor: Kenneth R. Koch
- Running time: 100 minutes
- Production companies: Paramount Television; The Fellows-Keegan Company

Original release
- Network: Syndication
- Release: June 13, 1980

The Girl, the Gold Watch & Everything is a 1980 American science fiction comedy television film based on the 1962 novel by John D. MacDonald, starring Robert Hays and Pam Dawber and directed by William Wiard. The film premiered in syndication on June 13, 1980, as part of Operation Prime Time syndicated programming.

A sequel, The Girl, the Gold Watch & Dynamite, was released in 1981.

== Plot ==
Kirby Winter is an easy-going man who meets a free-spirited brunette named Bonny and inherits from his millionaire uncle a gold watch that has the power to stop time.

== Cast ==
- Robert Hays as Kirby Winter
- Pam Dawber as Bonny Lee Beaumont
- Zohra Lampert as Miss Wilma Farnham
- Jill Ireland as Charla O'Rourke
- Ed Nelson as Joseph Locordolos
- Maurice Evans as Mr. Leroy Wintermore
- Peter Brown as Bodyguard
- Larry Hankin as René
- Macdonald Carey as Mr. Walton Grumby
- Burton Gilliam as Hoover Hess
