= The Twilight Zone season 5 =

The Twilight Zone
- Season 5
- No. of episodes: 36

Release
- Original network: CBS
- Original release: September 27, 1963 – June 19, 1964

Season chronology
- ← Previous; Season 4

The fifth and final season of The Twilight Zone aired Fridays at 9:30–10:00 pm (EST) on CBS from September 27, 1963 to June 19, 1964. It featured the same intro as the fourth season, but reverted to the original half-hour format. A color version of the opening was later used for Twilight Zone: The Movie.

== Episodes ==
No. overall	No. in season	Title	Directed by	Written by	Music by	Original release date	Prod. code
121	1	"In Praise of Pip"	Joseph M. Newman	Rod Serling	Rene Garriguenc	September 27, 1963	2607
122	2	"Steel"	Don Weis	Richard Matheson	Van Cleave	October 4, 1963	2602
123	3	"Nightmare at 20,000 Feet"	Richard Donner	Richard Matheson	N/A	October 11, 1963	2605
124	4	"A Kind of a Stopwatch"	John Rich	Based on a story by : Michael D. Rosenthal; Teleplay by : Rod Serling	Van Cleave	October 18, 1963	2609
125	5	"The Last Night of a Jockey"	Joseph M. Newman	Rod Serling	N/A	October 25, 1963	2616
126	6	"Living Doll"	Richard C. Sarafian	Jerry Sohl (credited to Charles Beaumont)	Bernard Herrmann	November 1, 1963	2621
127	7	"The Old Man in the Cave"	Alan Crosland, Jr.	Based on the short story "The Old Man" by : Henry Slesar; Teleplay by : Rod Serling	N/A	November 8, 1963	2603
128	8	"Uncle Simon"	Don Siegel	Rod Serling	N/A	November 15, 1963	2604
129	9	"Probe 7, Over and Out"	Ted Post	Rod Serling	N/A	November 29, 1963	2622
130	10	"The 7th Is Made Up of Phantoms"	Alan Crosland, Jr.	Rod Serling	N/A	December 6, 1963	2606
131	11	"A Short Drink from a Certain Fountain"	Bernard Girard	Based on a story by : Lou Holz; Teleplay by : Rod Serling	N/A	December 13, 1963	2614
132	12	"Ninety Years Without Slumbering"	Roger Kay	Story by : Johnson Smith; Teleplay by : Richard De Roy	Bernard Herrmann	December 20, 1963	2615
133	13	"Ring-a-Ding Girl"	Alan Crosland, Jr.	Earl Hamner, Jr.	N/A	December 27, 1963	2623
134	14	"You Drive"	John Brahm	Earl Hamner, Jr.	N/A	January 3, 1964	2625
135	15	"The Long Morrow"	Robert Florey	Rod Serling	N/A	January 10, 1964	2624
136	16	"The Self-Improvement of Salvadore Ross"	Don Siegel	Based on a short story by : Henry Slesar; Teleplay by : Jerry McNeely	N/A	January 17, 1964	2612
137	17	"Number 12 Looks Just Like You"	Abner Biberman	Charles Beaumont; John Tomerlin	N/A	January 24, 1964	2618
138	18	"Black Leather Jackets"	Joseph M. Newman	Earl Hamner, Jr.	Van Cleave	January 31, 1964	2628
139	19	"Night Call"	Jacques Tourneur	Richard Matheson	N/A	February 7, 1964 (Note: Originally scheduled for November 22, 1963, but delayed due to the assassination of John F. Kennedy)	2610
140	20	"From Agnes—With Love"	Richard Donner	Bernard C. Schoenfeld	Van Cleave	February 14, 1964	2629
141	21	"Spur of the Moment"	Elliot Silverstein	Richard Matheson	Rene Garriguenc	February 21, 1964	2608
142	22	"An Occurrence at Owl Creek Bridge"	Robert Enrico	From a story by : Ambrose Bierce; Adapted by : Robert Enrico	Henri Lanoë	February 28, 1964	N/A
143	23	"Queen of the Nile"	John Brahm	Jerry Sohl (credited to Charles Beaumont)	Lucien Moraweck	March 6, 1964	2626
144	24	"What's in the Box"	Richard L. Bare	Martin M. Goldsmith	N/A	March 13, 1964	2635
145	25	"The Masks"	Ida Lupino	Rod Serling	N/A	March 20, 1964	2601
146	26	"I Am the Night—Color Me Black"	Abner Biberman	Rod Serling	N/A	March 27, 1964	2630
147	27	"Sounds and Silences"	Richard Donner	Rod Serling	N/A	April 3, 1964	2631
148	28	"Caesar and Me"	Robert Butler	Adele T. Strassfield	Richard Shores	April 10, 1964	2636
149	29	"The Jeopardy Room"	Richard Donner	Rod Serling	N/A	April 17, 1964	2639
150	30	"Stopover in a Quiet Town" "Strangers in Town"	Ron Winston	Earl Hamner, Jr.	N/A	April 24, 1964	2611
151	31	"The Encounter"	Robert Butler	Martin M. Goldsmith	N/A	May 1, 1964	2640
152	32	"Mr. Garrity and the Graves"	Ted Post	Based on a story by : Mike Korologos; Teleplay by : Rod Serling	Tommy Morgan	May 8, 1964	2637
153	33	"The Brain Center at Whipple's"	Richard Donner	Rod Serling	N/A	May 15, 1964	2632
154	34	"Come Wander with Me"	Richard Donner	Anthony Wilson	Jeff Alexander	May 22, 1964	2641
155	35	"The Fear"	Ted Post	Rod Serling	N/A	May 29, 1964	2633
156	36	"The Bewitchin' Pool"	Joseph M. Newman	Earl Hamner, Jr.	N/A	June 19, 1964	2619
