= Stopover in a Quiet Town =

- The Twilight Zone episode
- Episode no.: Season 5 Episode 30
- Directed by: Ron Winston
- Written by: Earl Hamner, Jr.
- Production code: 2611
- Original air date: April 24, 1964

Guest appearances
- Barry Nelson: Bob Frazier; Nancy Malone: Millie Frazier; Denise Lynn: Little Alien Girl; Karen Norris: Alien Mother

Episode chronology
← Previous "The Jeopardy Room"	Next → "The Encounter"
- The Twilight Zone (1959 TV series) (season 5)

"Stopover in a Quiet Town" is episode 150 of the American television anthology series The Twilight Zone starring Barry Nelson and Nancy Malone. It originally aired on April 24, 1964.

== Opening narration ==
Bob and Millie Frazier, average young New Yorkers who attended a party in the country last night and on the way home took a detour. Most of us on waking in the morning know exactly where we are; the rooster or the alarm clock brings us out of sleep into the familiar sights, sounds, aromas of home and the comfort of a routine day ahead. Not so with our young friends. This will be a day like none they've ever spent - and they'll spend it in the Twilight Zone.

== Plot ==
A married couple, Bob and Millie Frazier, wake up in an unfamiliar house. Millie remembers only that Bob drank too much at a party the night before, and that while driving him home to Manhattan, a large shadow appeared over their car near Riverdale.

They discover that the house is mostly props. The telephone has no connection, the cabinetry is merely glued-on facing, and the refrigerator is filled with plastic food and empty cartons. They hear a girl's laughter and go outside to find the child. Once outside, however, they discover that the town is deserted; not even birds are heard. They find a stuffed squirrel, knock on the door of another house, and since it is Sunday, search for help in a church, which is also vacant. Bob rings the bell in the church's bell tower to attract attention. When no one comes, the increasingly desperate couple discovers no one is there, all the while hearing the young girl's laughter intermittently. They find even the trees are fake. A sudden fire on the ground reveals that the grass is papier-mâché. They see a parked car, and find only a mannequin in the driver's seat. Although the keys are in the ignition, the car will not start since it has no engine.

Millie begins to lose hope, proposing that they actually had crashed and died, and that they are in Hell. They hear a train whistle and, eager to leave the town, rush to the train station and board the empty train. As the train leaves the station (revealed to be in "Centerville"), they begin a lighthearted conversation, vastly relieved, admitting that Millie had been drinking as well. But when the train soon comes to a stop again in Centerville, they realize it has only gone in a circle, and they are back where they started.

They leave the train and begin walking out of town, once again hearing a little girl's laughter. A large shadow falls over them, and they flee, only to be scooped up by the hand of a gigantic child. The town is now revealed to be a model village with a miniature railway running around it. The little girl's mother says, "Be careful with your pets, dear. Daddy brought them all the way from Earth.", showing that the couple are pets to an alien family. At her mother's bidding, the little girl drops the couple back into the town. Bob and Millie begin to run, looking for a place to hide.

== Closing narration ==
The moral of what you've just seen is clear. If you drink, don't drive. And if your wife has had a couple, she shouldn't drive either. You might both just wake up with a whale of a headache in a deserted village in the Twilight Zone.
