= The Dummy =

- The Twilight Zone episode
- Episode no.: Season 3 Episode 33
- Directed by: Abner Biberman
- Story by: Lee Polk
- Teleplay by: Rod Serling
- Production code: 4826
- Original air date: May 4, 1962

Guest appearances
- Cliff Robertson: Jerry Etherson/Voice of Willie/Voice of Goofy Goggles; Frank Sutton: Frank, Jerry's agent; George Murdock: Willie (as ventriloquist); John Harmon: Georgie, nightclub manager; Sandra Warner: Noreen; Rudy Dolan: The M.C.; Ralph Manza: Doorman; Bethelynn Grey: Chorus Girl; Edy Williams: Chorus Girl

Episode chronology
← Previous "The Gift"	Next → "Young Man's Fancy"
- The Twilight Zone (1959 TV series) (season 3)

"The Dummy" is the 98th episode of the American television anthology series The Twilight Zone starring Cliff Robertson as a ventriloquist. It is not to be confused with a similar episode "Caesar and Me", in which Jackie Cooper plays a ventriloquist.

== Opening narration ==
You're watching a ventriloquist named Jerry Etherson, a voice-thrower par excellence. His alter ego, sitting atop his lap, is a brash stick of kindling with the sobriquet 'Willy'. In a moment, Mr. Etherson and his knotty pine partner will be booked in one of the out-of-the-way bistros, that small, dark, intimate place known as the Twilight Zone.

== Plot ==
Ventriloquist Jerry Etherson is performing an act with his dummy Willy in a small club in New York City. At the end of the act, Willy seems to bite Jerry's hand, and after he goes back to his dressing room, he finds teeth marks on his finger. He begins to drink from a liquor bottle he had hidden in a drawer. His agent, Frank, comes in and is upset that Jerry has resumed drinking. Jerry tells Frank, as he has numerous times before, that Willy is alive. Frank does not believe Jerry and has already pushed him into getting psychiatric help. Jerry is convinced that further psychiatric sessions would be redundant, and that the only solution is to get rid of Willy and perform with a different dummy, Goofy Goggles, from now on. He quickly comes up with new material for Goofy Goggles and locks Willy in a trunk.

After the second act, Jerry refuses to comply with the owner's wish that his dummy and he mingle with the audience. His agent considers this the last straw and quits, saying that Jerry's behavior, in particular what he sees as his delusional belief that Willy is alive, is keeping him from being a star. Jerry tells Frank he is leaving for Kansas City to get away from Willy. After leaving the theater, Jerry hears Willy's voice following him wherever he goes and sees his shadow on a wall. No one else can hear Willy, apparently confirming Frank's belief that Jerry is suffering from delusional fear.

Jerry runs back into the theater. He goes into the dark dressing room, opens the trunk, throws the dummy on the floor, and smashes it. When he turns on the light, though, he realizes that he destroyed the Goofy Goggles dummy instead of Willy. He cannot understand how he could have been mistaken. He then sees Willy sitting on the couch, talking to him and laughing at him. Willy tells him that it was he, Jerry, who made him alive. Realizing the truth, Jerry lowers his head as Willy cackles crazily.

The scene cuts to a man in Kansas City announcing the next act, "Jerry and Willy". The ventriloquist is actually Willy, and he is holding Jerry, who has been turned into a dummy.

== Closing narration ==
What's known in the parlance of the times as the old switcheroo, from boss to blockhead in a few uneasy lessons. And if you're given to nightclubbing on occasion, check this act. It's called Willy and Jerry, and they generally are booked into some of the clubs along the 'Gray Night Way' known, as the Twilight Zone.

== Production notes ==
Abner Biberman also directed "Number 12 Looks Just Like You".

The dummy used in this episode to portray Willy was originally created in the 1940s by puppetmaker Revello Petee. The same dummy was used later, in the 1964 Twilight Zone episode "Caesar and Me". The actual original dummy, which was used in both episodes, had been housed in a private collection in Connecticut since the late 1970s, but now resides in David Copperfield's International Museum and Library of the Conjuring Arts in Las Vegas, along with the Cliff Robertson dummy effigy, which appears at the end of this episode. Both puppets were subject to a careful, preservative renovation by American artist and puppet restoration expert Alan Semok.

== See also ==
- Dead of Night, a 1945 British horror film with a segment featuring a malevolent dummy
