= Arthur Lonergan =

American art director

- Born: January 23, 1906; New York City, New York
- Died: January 23, 1989 (aged 83); Los Angeles, California
- Occupation: Art director
- Years active: 1946-1971

Arthur Lonergan (January 23, 1906 – January 23, 1989) was an American art director. He was nominated for an Academy Award in the category Best Art Direction for the film The Oscar. He also was the art director for the films Forbidden Planet, Yours, Mine and Ours and M*A*S*H.

== Selected filmography ==
- Forbidden Planet (1956)
- The Oscar (1966)
- M*A*S*H (1970)
