= Uncle Simon =

- The Twilight Zone episode
- Episode no.: Season 5 Episode 8
- Directed by: Don Siegel
- Written by: Rod Serling
- Production code: 2604
- Original air date: November 15, 1963

Guest appearances
- Cedric Hardwicke: Uncle Simon; Constance Ford: Barbara Polk; Ian Wolfe: Schwimmer; Robby the Robot: robotic Uncle Simon (uncredited)

Episode chronology
← Previous "The Old Man in the Cave"	Next → "Probe 7, Over and Out"
- The Twilight Zone (1959 TV series) (season 5)

"Uncle Simon" is an episode of the American television anthology series The Twilight Zone. The episode explores people's willingness to wallow in misery and hate, through the example of a woman who submits herself to serving first her mean-spirited uncle, and later the robot he malevolently designed.

== Opening narration ==
Dramatis personae: Mr. Simon Polk, a gentleman who has lived out his life in a gleeful rage; and the young lady who's just beat the hasty retreat is Mr. Polk's niece, Barbara. She has lived her life as if during each ensuing hour she had a dentist appointment. There is yet a third member of the company soon to be seen. He now resides in the laboratory and he is the kind of character to be found only in the Twilight Zone.

== Plot ==
Barbara Polk has lived with her elderly, sadistic uncle Simon Polk for 25 years — even though she hates him — as she is the only heir to his fortune. Simon constantly harangues his niece, calling her various unflattering names and insulting her in creative ways. He uses a laboratory in the basement of his house to develop inventions, and has forbidden her from going down there to see his latest project, about which he drops malevolent hints. When she sneaks into the basement to peek at it, the two have a verbal altercation. Simon catches her and raises his cane to strike. Barbara blocks with her arm, causing him to fall down the stairs and break his back. Frustrated with his abuse, nagging, and constant demands for hot chocolate, Barbara declines to assist and purposefully lets him die.

Following Simon’s death, his lawyer Mr. Schwimmer reads the will to Barbara: to inherit his estate, she must live in the house and look after his last invention, a robot also named Simon. Although its behavior and speech are very mechanical at first, it engages in AI learning as time goes on. It eventually acts and sounds just like him — right down to the old man’s limp, which it develops as a result of damage from Barbara’s attempt to destroy it by pushing it over backward. The robot repeats insults that Uncle Simon had programmed, berating Barbara as a “bovine crab” and “peanut-headed sample of nature’s carelessness.” Since Mr. Schwimmer makes regular visits to ensure that Barbara is taking proper care of the robot, as per the stipulations of the will, she has no choice but to submit to its continuing verbal abuse and demands or risk being disinherited. After Mr. Schwimmer leaves, the robot demands hot chocolate and Barbara reluctantly complies, addressing it as "Uncle."

== Closing narration ==
Dramatis personae, a metal man who'll go by the name of Simon, whose life as well as his body has been stamped out for him; and the woman who tends to him, the lady Barbara, who's discovered belatedly that all bad things don't come to an end, and that once a bed is made, it's quite necessary that you sleep in it. Tonight's uncomfortable little exercise in avarice and automatons, from the Twilight Zone.
