= Herbie Faye =

American actor

- Born: February 2, 1899; Galicia, Austria-Hungary
- Died: June 28, 1980 (aged 81); Las Vegas, Nevada, U.S.
- Occupation: Actor
- Years active: 1951–1980 (his death)

Herbie Faye (February 2, 1899 – June 28, 1980) was an American actor and vaudeville comedian who appeared in both of Phil Silvers' television series on the CBS network, The Phil Silvers Show (1955–1959) and The New Phil Silvers Show (1963–1964). Faye died June 28, 1980, from heart failure.

== Career ==
Faye worked with Mildred Harris in vaudeville, with Silvers as one of the supporting cast. His relationship with Silvers began in 1928 when Silvers was the straight man in Faye's act.

On Broadway, Faye appeared in Top Banana (1951) and Wine, Women and Song (1942).

In movies, Faye appeared in 1956 as Max in The Harder They Fall, a boxing story starring Humphrey Bogart in his last role. In 1961, he appeared as a cook in the comedy film Snow White and the Three Stooges. In 1962, he portrayed Charlie the bartender, in another boxing film Requiem for a Heavyweight, starring Anthony Quinn.

== Filmography ==
=== Film ===
Year	Title	Role	Notes
1954	Top Banana	Moe	
1955	The Shrike	Tager	
1956	The Harder They Fall	Max	
1959	Never Steal Anything Small	Hymie	
1961	Snow White and the Three Stooges	Head Cook	Uncredited
1962	Requiem for a Heavyweight	Charlie, the Bartender	
1963	Come Blow Your Horn	Waiter	Uncredited
1963	The Thrill of It All	Irving	
1964	The Patsy	Tailor	Uncredited
1964	The Disorderly Orderly	Mr. Welles, Patient	Uncredited
1965	The Family Jewels	Joe	
1966	The Ghost and Mr. Chicken	Man in Diner	Uncredited
1966	The Fortune Cookie	Maury, the Equipment Man	
1967	Enter Laughing	Mr. Schoenbaum	
1967	Thoroughly Modern Millie	Taxi Driver	
1968	Blackbeard's Ghost	Croupier	
1968	The Night They Raided Minsky's	Waiter	Uncredited
1969	Angel in My Pocket	Mr. Welch	
1969	The Love God?	Lester Timkin	
1971	Who Is Harry Kellerman and Why Is He Saying Those Terrible Things About Me?	Divorcee	
1980	Melvin and Howard	Man Witness	(final film role)

=== Television ===
Year	Title	Role	Notes
1955–1959	The Phil Silvers Show	Corporal Sam Fender	Series regular
1961	The Tom Ewell Show	Whitey	Episode "Mr. Shrewd" (Season 1, Episode 15)
1961	The Tom Ewell Show	Rudy	Episode "Handy Man" (Season 1, Episode 28)
1963	The Twilight Zone	Joe Palucci, the bartender	Season 5 Episode 4: "A Kind of a Stopwatch"
1964	The Dick Van Dyke Show	Harry Keen	Episode "Brother Can You Spare $2,500" (Season 4, Episode 15
1963–1964	The New Phil Silvers Show	Waluska	Series regular
1965	My Favorite Martian	Andy Fuller	Episode "Magnetic Personality" (Season 2, Episode 25)
1965	The Munsters	Rod	Episode "Herman Munster, Shutterbug"
1966	Bewitched	Kovacks' Manager	Season 2 Episode 21: "Fastest Gun on Madison Avenue"
1966	Bewitched	William Dunn	Season 2 Episode 32: "A Bum Raps"
1967	Rango	Storekeeper	Episode "Rango the Outlaw"
1967	The Andy Griffith Show	Eddie Blake	Season 8 Episode 8: “The Tape Recorder”
1974	Happy Days	POP	Episode "Knock Around the Block" (Season 1, Episode 15)
