= Elen Willard =

American actress

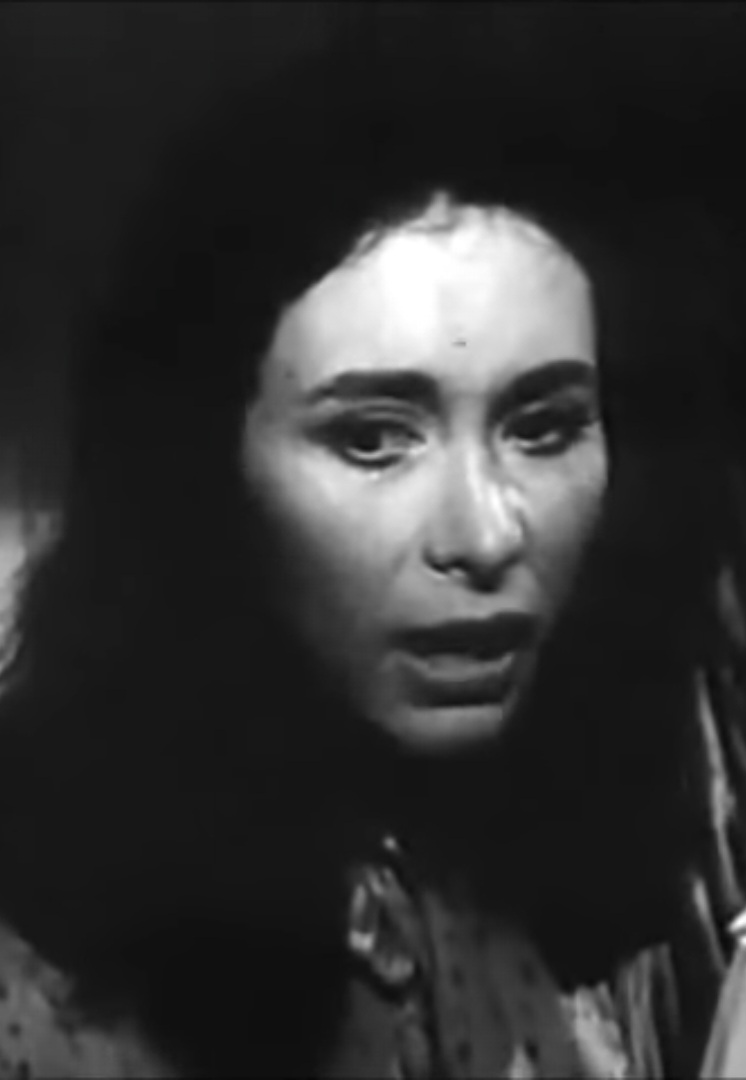
- Born: United States
- Occupation: Character Actress
- Years active: 1960–1966

Elen Willard is a retired American character actress. She worked exclusively in various American network dramatic television series from 1960 to 1966. Her very first aired performance was a supporting role in a 1960 episode of the short-lived CBS detective series, Markham, which starred Ray Milland.

Successively, over a six-year period, Willard portrayed twenty-four characters in twenty different dramatic television series consisting of various featured guest star and supporting performances, including most notably Alcoa Presents: One Step Beyond, Outlaws, Perry Mason, Ben Casey, Dr. Kildare, Combat!, Gunsmoke, Whispering Smith, and Have Gun - Will Travel.

In her Ben Casey episode, "A Dark Night for Billy Harris", Willard plays the wife of the title character (a young Bruce Dern), who has fallen victim to a seriously disturbed, trigger-happy cop, played by the pre-Kojak Telly Savalas.

Willard's most recognized performance, and comprising only just a mere collective five minutes of screen time, is her portrayal of the character Ione Sykes in the 1961 Twilight Zone episode, "The Grave". A gothic-themed western, written and directed by Montgomery Pittman, the episode affords Willard not merely its pivotal scene (in which Conny Miller, the protagonist played by Lee Marvin, is given a serious, potentially life-threatening scare), but also its final word, with which she refutes the "rational explanation" that had briefly offered some respite from the episode's overriding sense of foreboding; thus, fellow characters and audience members alike are left, at the closing credits, in much the same state as Conny Miller had been, previously.

In April 1962, Willard made her MGM-TV debut as Richard Chamberlain's romantic interest in the Dr. Kildare episode, "Horn of Plenty". Written by James Blumgarten and directed by Paul Wendkos, where the story concerns a wealthy heiress, who tempts Kildare with visions of life as a wealthy physician, and entailed a good deal of location shooting at Leo Carrillo State Beach.

In November 1962, Willard was the first amongst a sextet of Kildare leading ladies—most notably Suzanne Pleshette, Anne Francis, and Chamberlain's then rumored real-life lover, Clara Ray—seen on a full-page spread in the Sunday Star-Ledger. The following month, Willard was featured in an episode of the Alcoa Premiere series (presented by Fred Astaire)–alongside Pleshette and Viveca Lindfors–as Jennifer Cooke, the British member of an international trio of Best Actress contenders at a film festival held in France. The episode, entitled "Competition", co-stars Chester Morris as a Hollywood producer. Meanwhile, Hollywood Reporter had disclosed that Willard, along with Garth Benton, Frank Silvera, and Tyler McVey, had been cast in "Memory of a Firing Squad" an episode of The Young and the Bold aka Channing.

During the final two years of Willard's career, she guest starred in four separate episodes of the ABC/Quinn Martin World War II based series Twelve O'Clock High.

Willard's last broadcast appearance, credited as Ellen Willard, was as Salvation Army worker Priscilla Worth in a Christmas-themed episode of The Man from U.N.C.L.E. entitled "The Jingle Bells Affair", which was initially aired Friday, December 23, 1966.

Actor Earl Holliman, who guest starred opposite her in the second of her four appearances in Twelve O'Clock High, said in an interview for a book on that series published in 2005 that he had "... heard she had quit acting because it was such an emotionally painful experience for her."
