= A Little Peace and Quiet =

- The Twilight Zone segment
- Episode no.: Season 1 Episode 1b
- Directed by: Wes Craven
- Written by: James Crocker
- Original air date: September 27, 1985

Guest appearances
- Melinda Dillon as Penny; Greg Mullavey as Russell; Clare Nono as Newscaster; Joshua Harris as Russell Jr.; Judith Barsi as Bertie

Episode chronology
← Previous "Shatterday"	Next → "Wordplay"

"A Little Peace and Quiet" is the second segment of the first episode of the first season of the television series The Twilight Zone. In this segment, a woman discovers a pendant which allows her to freeze time.

== Plot ==
While digging in her garden, housewife Penny unearths a wooden box containing a gold pendant in the shape of a sundial. She discovers that saying "shut up" while wearing the pendant causes the entire world but herself to become frozen in time and saying "start talking" makes everything begin moving again. She uses this power to give herself much-needed reprieves from the demands of her dim-witted and hapless husband Russell and their four children: Janet and Susan, who are always fighting; Bertie, who is clumsy; and Russell Jr., who is always playing pranks. She also silences news programs about recent arms talks between the United States and the Soviet Union and moves door-to-door anti-nuclear weapons activists away from her house while they are frozen in time.

One evening, the radio announces that nuclear missiles are heading for the United States from the Soviet Union. When the radio reveals that ICBMs have entered U.S. airspace, the terrified Penny freezes time, then leaves her house and walks through town. As she notices terrified people looking skyward, she looks up to see a Soviet nuclear missile frozen a few hundred feet in the air, nose down, and moments from impact. She is left with a no-win choice: unfreeze time and die or live eternally alone in a silent world.

== Production ==
No visual effects were used for the time stops; the actors and numerous extras, even the dog, all had to hold themselves perfectly still during these sequences. In the cases of characters who were frozen in off-balance positions (e.g. running or lunging), concealed armatures were used to support their weight. The mid-pour orange juice and mid-spill milk were both plastic.

Director Wes Craven said the child actors needed little encouragement to be rambunctious, being naturally full of energy. In conjunction with the exceptionally large cast, the set was always chaotic between takes.

Lead actress Melinda Dillon's shouting "Shut up!" an extra two times as the nuclear missiles approach was unscripted. In the final scene, the two films playing in the theater when Penny stops time are Dr. Strangelove and Fail Safe. Both 1964 films depict nuclear warfare.

== See also ==
- Culture during the Cold War
