= I Survived a Japanese Game Show season 2 =

I Survived a Japanese Game Show
- Season 2
- ABC's promotional logo for Season 2 of ISaJGS.
- Starring: Rome Kanda (TV and Majide Host)

Release
- Original release: June 17 – August 5, 2009

Season chronology
- ← Previous; Season 1

Season two of the reality show I Survived a Japanese Game Show premiered on ABC on June 17, 2009, and was the final run of the series. Like season one, it follows a group of Americans who leave the United States for Japan, where they compete in a Japanese style game show.

The number of episodes were increased from seven to eight for this season. Other significant changes from season one was that Tony Sano, who hosted the first season, did not return to host the second season, and the number of players was increased from ten to twelve. Also, while season one had only one group game before the elimination game, season two added a second group game, with the winning team from the first game gaining an advantage in the second game. Otherwise, the format remained the same from season one.

Originally, ten episodes were being produced, but due to the return of Who Wants to Be a Millionaire on primetime, the show was reduced to eight. At the end of Episode 7, there is a scene that features clowns and liquor but was never aired in time for the season finale. In the season finale that aired on August 5, Cathy Grosam, a 36-year-old "soccer mom" from Bartlett, Illinois, was declared the winner. Grosam also was a member on the winning team in every team game and thus participated in every reward event during the season. She won a cash prize of US$250,000 (JP¥25 million).

== Contestants ==
- Order of appearance in the opening credits: Brent, Cathy, Bobaloo, Yari, Dan, Debbie, Drew, Jamie, Justin, Kimberly, Linda and Megan.

| Contestant | Original Teams | First Switch (Note: The teams were uneven at the time, as the Green Tigers voted Cathy to move over to the opposite team Red Robots.) | Second Switch (Note: The teams were uneven again, as Cathy moved back to the Green Tigers.) | Third Switch (Note: The teams were uneven for a third time, as Megan moved to the Red Robots.) | Girls vs. Boys | Final Three | Finish |
|---|---|---|---|---|---|---|---|
| Kimberly Whitaker (キンバリー); 26, Philadelphia, Pennsylvania | Red; Robots | | | | | | 1st eliminated (against Yari) |
| Yari Agramonte (ヤリ); 23, Bronx, New York | Red; Robots | | | | | | 2nd eliminated (against Dan) |
| Debbie Kaufmann (デビー); 22, Easton, Connecticut | Green; Tigers | Green; Tigers | | | | | 3rd eliminated (against Brent) |
| Bob "Bobaloo" Koenig (ババルー); 35, Los Angeles, California | Green; Tigers | Green; Tigers | | | | | 4th eliminated (against Megan) |
| Drew Sealey (ドリュー); 29, St. Louis, Missouri | Red; Robots | Red; Robots | Red; Robots | | | | 5th eliminated (against Jamie) |
| Jamie Lewis (ジェイミー); 25, Fairless Hills, Pennsylvania | Red; Robots | Red; Robots | Red; Robots | | | | 6th eliminated (against Dan) |
| Dan Barbour (ダン); 25, Shrewsbury, Massachusetts | Red; Robots | Red; Robots | Red; Robots | Red; Robots | | | 7th eliminated (against Justin) |
| Megan Bentley (メーガン); 29, Chicago, Illinois | Green; Tigers | Green; Tigers | Green; Tigers | Red; Robots | | | 8th eliminated (against Justin) |
| Brent Alexander (ブレント); 29, Miami, Florida | Green; Tigers | Green; Tigers | Green; Tigers | Green; Tigers | Red; Robots | | 9th eliminated (against Justin) |
| Justin Brown (ジャスティン); 22, Brownsville, Pennsylvania | Red; Robots | Red; Robots | Red; Robots | Red; Robots | Red; Robots | Final; Three | 10th eliminated, 3rd place |
| Linda Plaxen (リンダ); 32, Los Angeles, California | Green; Tigers | Green; Tigers | Green; Tigers | Green; Tigers | Green; Tigers | Final; Three | Runner-up |
| Cathy Grosam (キャシー); 36, Bartlett, Illinois | Green; Tigers | Red; Robots | Green; Tigers | Green; Tigers | Green; Tigers | Final; Three | Winner |

== List of episodes ==
ISaJGS 2
| No. overall | No. in season | Title | Original release date | U.S. viewers (millions) |
|---|---|---|---|---|
| 8 | 1 | "Episode 1" | June 17, 2009 | N/A |
The 12 contestants across the states are invited by the producers and random Japanese mobs who escorted them to Japan to participate in a Japanese game show Majide. The 12 contestants are grouped into two groups of six: the initial members for Red Robots consist of Dan, Drew, Jamie, Justin, Kimberly and Yari; Green Tigers have Brent, Bobaloo, Cathy, Debbie, Linda and Megan as the initial members.: Advantage Challenge: Rabbit Fire (ラビットファイヤー; Rabittofaiyā): Each team has three minutes to carry as many bento boxes across a narrow plank as possible while the opposing team fires sticky balls at them, attempting to knock boxes out of their hands or knocking players into the foam pit. Each team member must cross over to the opposite platform before the next player can start crossing; if at any point the team member falls off before they cross over, their turn ends and none of the boxes they had in their hands at the time will count. The team who carries the most boxes wins.; Winning team: Green Tigers (58-57 boxes); Team Challenge: Wheel of Human Torpedos (人間魚雷ボウリング; Ningen Gyorai Bowling): One member of each team sits in the middle of a spinning platform while three other teammates lay flat while connected to the spinning platform. With a three-minute time limit, the sitting teammate must release the laying players in an attempt to hit one of several stacks of metal cans that are placed around the edge of the floor, attempting to knock as many cans as possible into a surrounding flour pit. Each "torpedo" must then hit a buzzer before the next torpedo can be launched. If a torpedo is launched before the previous player hits the buzzer, any cans they knocked over won't count. The team who knocks out the most cans wins.; Advantage: The Green Tigers is given an addition torpedo to use if required.; Winning team and Reward: Green Tigers (8); A helicopter trip to Mount Fuji.; Losing team and Punishment: Red Robots (5); Cleaning inside a Kannai Station in a Yokohama Municipal Subway.; Nominated for elimination game: Kimberly and Yari; Elimination Challenge: Big Spider Yanky Danky (ビッグスパイダーヤンキーダンキー; Biggusupaidāyankīdankī): Contestants are donned in spider suits and attached to a bungee cord. The contestants have three minutes to burst balloons (containing either a butterfly wing or body), then walk up a sloped platform to attach several butterfly parts onto the butterfly stands, matching body part colors to colors on the stands; the members have to attach it quickly before the bungee cord pulls itself back to the balloon pit. The member with the most butterfly parts attached is the winner; if there is a tie, the tie is resolved based on the number of completed butterfly bodies. The loser gets surprised by the Sayonara Mob and taken away.; Winner: Yari (12; had 4 completed bodies); Eliminated: Kimberly (12; had 2 completed bodies)
| 9 | 2 | "Episode 2" | June 24, 2009 | N/A |
Advantage Challenge: Party In My Pants' (パーティーパンツ; Pātīpantsu): Teams have three minutes to pick up as many tennis balls that are shot at them with claw grippers and put the balls in a pair of pants the entire team is wearing together. The team with the most tennis balls in their pants wins.; Winning team: Green Tigers (104-102); Team Challenge: Somebody Put Clothes On Bob (着せかえ ボブちゃん; Kisekae Bob-chan): Teams must dress up dummies of Judge Bob in a green tam o'shanter, a shirt, tie, vest, and a pair of pants, which are hidden inside a flour pit; there are also some other clothing that don't fulfill the criteria. The first team to find all five articles of clothing and put them on the Judge Bob dummy properly wins.; Advantage: Green Tigers is given a five-second head start.; Winning team and Reward: Green Tigers; VIP trip to watch a baseball game inside Tokyo Dome.; Losing team and Punishment: Red Robots; Working at Lotte Kasai Golf driving range.; Nominated for elimination game: Dan and Yari; Elimination Challenge: Lotion, Lotion, What's The Commotion? (ローション騒動; Lotion Sōdō): Each player, drenched in baby lotion, have to navigate slippery slopes while holding a torch, then take an egg and carry it on their helmet to the opposite side of the area without breaking it. Afterwards, they then go under another pool of lotion, then through a pool of bubbles and go over six sumo wrestlers and trade the torch for a gold medal, and then retrace their steps back to a buzzer to stop the clock. The member that completes the course in the fastest time wins, while the loser gets the Sayonara Mob response.; Winner: Dan (2:36); Eliminated: Yari (5:33)
| 10 | 3 | "Episode 3" | July 1, 2009 | N/A |
As Red Robots had two consecutive eliminations, one of the Green Tigers had to switch over to the red team to even up the teams; Cathy ended up being the one to switch.: Advantage Challenge: Gopher Make U Crazy (たたいて邪魔してピンポンパン; Tataite Jama Shite Pinponpan): One team shoots out ping pong balls into wells using their mouths while the other four players from the opposing team try to defend the areas with large hand-held noodles and the fifth, in Whac-A-Mole style with a powdered hammer. The team which collected more ping pong balls after a two-and-a-half minute time wins an advantage.; Winning team: Red Robots (106-66); Team Challenge: Four Near-Sighted Mice and Big Cheese (見えないネズミと巨大なチーズ; Mienai Nezumi to Kyodaina Cheese): Three players wear semi-blind goggles and a pair of boxing glove, each had to catch cartons of milk placed by a teammate on a conveyor belt; a fifth player, dressed as "The Big Cheese", swings from above and alert the players when the milk cartons will come to them. Once the player catches the carton, they go to a jug and pour the milk into it; the team with the most milk in their jug after two minutes wins.; Advantage: One member from the Red Robots is not required to wear boxing gloves.; Winning team and Reward: Red Robots; dining at Kayabukiya Tavern and traveling in Shinkansen; Losing team and Punishment: Green Tigers; constructing a Zen garden at the Majide house; Nominated for elimination game: Brent and Debbie; Elimination Challenge: Big Penguin Belly Flop (ペンギンたちの腹ばい; Pengin-tachi no Harabai): Players have two minutes to pop as many glop-filled egg balloons as possible (using only their abdomen and stomach). The player who pops the most balloons wins. The loser gets a phone call from the Sayonara Mob.; Winner: Brent (20); Eliminated: Debbie (16)
| 11 | 4 | "Episode 4" | July 8, 2008 | N/A |
Advantage Challenge: Snap Attack! (スナップアタック!; Sunappuatakku!): Players from both sides sit slightly unseen across from one another and pull rubber bands that must hit the player in the body to score a point for themselves. The first player in each zone to hit the opponent twice wins that zone and a point for their team; the first team to score three points wins the game.; Winning team: Red Robots (3-1); Team Challenge: Paint Splash Madness! (狂気! しぶき! ペンキ!; Kyōki! Shibuki! Penki!): Three players spin on a turntable pulling cords with paint inside buckets falling on them. A fourth player sits on another turntable and wears a canvas-like backdrop on their face and a bucket below their chin. The team that gets the most paint in their bucket in three minutes wins.; Advantage: Red Robots is given an additional bucket.; Winning team and Reward: Red Robots (1.12 kg); driving and drifting on a race track.; Losing team and Punishment: Green Tigers (0.68 kg); working at a gas station; Nominated for elimination game: Bobaloo and Megan; Elimination Challenge: Alien Took My Teddy Bear (エイリアンは私のテディベアを取った; Alien wa Watashi no Teddybear o Totta): Each player wears an alien suit and have to traverse across a course with a two conveyor belts and three turntables in-between the belts while carrying a giant stuffed toy panda to the other side within two minutes. If a player falls into one of two flour pits at either end, they must start over. The player who gets the most toys carried over wins, while the loser gets a bearhug from the Sayonara Mob.; Winner: Megan (2); Eliminated: Bobaloo (1)
| 12 | 5 | "Episode 5" | July 15, 2009 | N/A |
Following the two consecutive losses from the Green Tigers, the Red Robots had to choose a member to even up the teams; they chose Cathy, reinstating her back to the Green Tigers.: Advantage Challenge: Soccer Time With Grandpa (ジジババサッカー; Jiji-Baba Soccer): Players attempt to score as many soccer goals as possible under two minutes while donned with distorted goggles. The team who scores the most goals wins.; Winning team: Green Tigers (5-3); Team Challenge: Stuck On Golf (ミニゴルフ べっとり マスターズ; Mini-golf Bettori Master): Each team have to place as many golf balls as possible onto a sticky green within 90 seconds. For the first minute of the game, the two members from the opposing team attempt to detach any balls onto the green, while another two members would defend the green; after 30 seconds, the pairs would be switched. On the last 30 seconds on the game, all members were to detach it. The team with the fewest balls attached onto the green wins.; Disadvantage: Red Robots had two members wearing shackles as handicap.; Winning team and Reward: Green Tigers (15); A tour on a 400-year old sake brewery and Yamagata beef tasting.; Losing team and Punishment: Red Robots (24); Working with harvesting seaweed on a boat.; Nominated for elimination game: Drew and Jamie; Elimination Challenge: Stretchy Squid Face (イカパンスト; Ikapansuto): Using only their mouths, players had to pull as many squids as possible while wearing a pantyhose mask attached to a bungee cord within two minutes. The player who pulls the most squids wins, the loser is busted by the Sayonara Mob.; Winner: Jamie (12); Eliminated: Drew (11)
| 13 | 6 | "Episode 6" | July 22, 2009 | N/A |
Advantage Challenge: Brain Freeze Fish Breath! (極寒でキ〜ン魚!; Gokkan Ddeki 〜n Sakana!): Teams dipped their heads into a tub filled with iced water and collect as many dead fish as possible using only their mouths in two-and-a-half minutes. The team who collects the most fish wins.; Winning team: Green Tigers (3-1); Team Challenge: Baby Go Boom, Boom! (ねんねんころりYOおころりYO; Nen'nen Korori YO o Korori YO): Each team member, dressed as babies, sit in a giant spinning crib. One at a time, each member exits out the crib and fill two cups with milk. The player must run an obstacle course (consists of spinning platforms, a spanking machine and involving on crawling) while carrying milk to a giant baby bottle. After finishing the course, the player must press a button beside the crib enabling another player to begin. The team with the most milk in their bottle in three minutes wins. The timer will start once the crib stops spinning for the first time.; Disadvantage: One member from the Red Robots had to instead dress as a grandma with a baby on their back.; Winning team and Reward: Green Tigers; Watching a match and a workout exercise with sumo wrestlers.; Losing team and Punishment: Red Robots; Working as sumo servants.; Nominated for elimination game: Dan and Jamie; Elimination Challenge: Up Your Nose, Dragon (アップユアノーズドラゴン; Appuyuanōzudoragon): Each player slides down a wall attempting to throw balls into holes where the nostrils of a dragon would be before hitting the ground and soap suds all over the landing area. The player who throws the most balls after two-and-a-half minutes wins, and the loser is taken out via the foam-covered, 24-legged Sayonara Mob (as a riddle).; Winner: Dan (3); Eliminated: Jamie (0)
| 14 | 7 | "Episode 7" | July 29, 2009 | N/A |
As the Red Robots lost two members due to the consecutive defeats, the team was uneven for the third time; one Green Tiger had to change teams to even out the members, and Megan was sent to the Red Robots.: Advantage Challenge: Sour Milk for Kitty (仔猫のサワーミルク; Koneko no Sour Milk): Players dressed as cats with a bowl attached on their heads stood on a vibrating platform. Each member scoops out milk onto their bowls, transferring to their teammates one at a time into a container at the back of the third player. The team with the most milk after two minutes wins.; Winning team: Green Tigers; Team Challenge: Big Foot Bang Bang (デカ足バンバン; Deka Ashi Bangbang): One player is designated as a goaltender against a soccer goal dressed as a cactus against the other team dressed as various fruits and vegetables. The other teammates control the goaltender using a rope-pulley system to score as many goals into the goal using only large balloons. The balloon pops when it come contact onto the goaltender. The team who scores the most goals after two minutes wins.; Advantage: Green Tigers is awarded a free kick.; Winning team and Reward: Green Tigers (12); Samurai training course and involvement in a samurai festival.; Losing team and Punishment: Red Robots (2); working in a chopsticks making by chopping bamboos.; Nominated for elimination game: Dan and Justin; Elimination Challenge: You Look Funny Stuck On Wall (ぴぅたんこバンバン; Pi~utanko Bang Bang): The challenge is a homage on an elimination challenge played on the last season: Players donned in velcro suits jump off a trampoline and attempt to stick to the sticky wall within a body-shaped outline. The player was judged on outline and the point is awarded on the player with more outline. The game is played in a best-of-seven, and the first player scoring four points wins and is peeled off the wall by studio crew to stay and play more Majide Games. The losing player is peeled off the wall and carried out back to America by the Sayonara Mob.; Winner: Justin (4); Eliminated: Dan (1)
| 15 | 8 | "Finale" | August 5, 2009 | N/A |
Team Challenge: Dude! Where's My Luggage? (おーい, オレの荷物どこだよ!?; O ̄i, Oreno Nimotsu Dokodayo!?): Players run on a conveyor belt carrying luggage to find luggates with a blue tag to throw into a luggage bin next to the belt within three minutes. To even the level of playing field, one Green Tiger member wore a carrot suit and boxing gloves.; Winning team and Reward: Green Tigers (24); A visit to a Joypolis video game arcade and travelling with the Tokyo Cruise Ship.; Losing team and Punishment: Red Robots (17); a visit to Buddhist monks for intensive training.; Elimination Challenge: Balloon Assassin! (風船の暗殺者; Fūsen no Asashin): Players must pop large confetti-filled balloons hanging from the studio ceiling using bungee cords and a trampoline by using gorilla arms with pins in their hands. A yellow balloon is worth one point and a blue is worth two; the player with more points after two-and-a-half minutes wins, the loser is bounced out by the Sayonara Mob.; Winner: Justin (31); Eliminated: Megan (23); Following Megan's elimination, Kanda assigned Brent to Red Robots to even out the teams one last time this season, thus the competition became a "Boys vs Girls" format.: Team Challenge: You Stand Still! No, You Stand Still! (くらくら鍵パッカン; Kurakura Kagi Pakkan): Another challenge based on a team challenge from season one. Each member is dressed as either a geisha or a samurai and seated on a rotating chair. After the chairs stop spinning, the players must cross a narrow balance beam over a pool of flour and a pair of spinning floor tiles to trade costumes on the spinning tiles, and then go back to retrieve the prop for the other character (either a fan or a sword). After retrieving both props, both members must backtrack to the rotating chairs to complete the task. The team that completes this challenge in the fastest time wins.; Winning team and Reward: Green Tigers (1:44)- an appearance in a Tokyo television talk show Zoom In Super; Losing team and Punishment: Red Robots (2:16)- Working in a bento factory and delivery of boxes; Elimination Challenge: T-Shirt of Torture! (拷問Tシャツ; Gōmon T-Shirt): Players wore a large number of T-shirts, each with a letter on the back of each one to spell out a phrase. While they took off the shirt, various hindrances will rain down to distract the player. Once the player figured out the phrase ("I need to win this game to be safe"), the player must press the buzzer to answer; the first player to correctly recite the phrase wins and the loser gets a surprise from the audience area with the Sayonara Mob.; Winner: Justin; Eliminated: Brent; Following Brent's elimination, the final three were informed about the dissolution of teams and would be competing as individuals.: Individual Challenge 1: Making New Friends In Japan! (世界に広げようむちゃぶりの輪; Sekai Ni Hirogeyou Mucha-buri no wa): Another challenge based on one of the individual challenges from season one. Each contestant, dressed as sailor uniforms, crosses all around Tokyo to accomplish five tasks, all in the following order below, before they could go to the finish at the base of Tokyo Tower. The last person to complete the tasks is eliminated, leaving with his/her worst foe, The Sayonara Mob! These tasks were: 1. Get someone to bow 10 times; 2. Get someone to put on lipstick provided to them and kiss them; 3. Get someone to tickle them by saying a phrase in Japanese; 4. Borrow a cell phone and call the studio; 5. Get five people to do the can-can dance.; Eliminated: Justin; Following Justin's elimination, the final two, Cathy and Linda, celebrated their final moments in a Roppongi Hills Mori Tower; then-House of Representatives member of Tokyo (later to become Governor) Yuriko Koike came to congratulate the finalists.: Individual Challenge 2: Super Majide! (超本気で!; Chō-Majide!): The final Individual Challenge's full title was Twelve Americans Came, They Worked Really Hard, They Ate Squid, They Wore All Kinds Of Things, They Went Through Much Pain, Now Two People Remain For Super Majide!. The final two contestants, dressed as a fox kigurimi, competed head-to-head on an obstacle course combined with various challenges encountered throughout the season. They begin by traversing on conveyor belts to a flour pit filled with balloons to the other side, then deliver ten bento boxes across a slippery beam while tennis balls are being shot at them. Afterwards, they traverse to a sticky floor where the fox costume is eventually removed to reveal a tank top and bicycle shorts, and must remove five squid heads using only their mouths. They slide on a lotion covered platform and torpedoing a stack of boxes to get to the other side. Once they get through, they must fill a cup with paint from an overhead bucket by pulling on a cord while standing on a spinner, then transfer the paint into a jug. Once the jug is filled enough, a lever mechanism will trigger which will pop a balloon that contain a key to unlock the door to the final room with a buzzer inside. The first contestant to reach the buzzer is named the winner of the $250,000 (¥25 million) prize and greeted by the Omedeto Mob (Sayonara Mob dressed in white).; Winner: Cathy; Runner-up: Linda

== Game results ==
Elimination chart
| No. | Name | 1 | 2 | 3 | 4 | 5 | 6 | 7 | 8 | | | |
|---|---|---|---|---|---|---|---|---|---|---|---|---|
| 1 | Cathy | WIN | WIN | WIN | WIN | WIN | WIN | WIN | WIN | WIN | SAFE | OMEDETO |
| 2 | Linda | WIN | WIN | LOSE | LOSE | WIN | WIN | WIN | WIN | WIN | SAFE | SAYONARA |
| 3 | Justin | LOSE | LOSE | WIN | WIN | LOSE | LOSE | LOSE | LOSE | LOSE | SAYONARA | |
| 4 | Brent | WIN | WIN | LOSE | LOSE | WIN | WIN | WIN | WIN | SAYONARA | | |
| 5 | Megan | WIN | WIN | LOSE | LOSE | WIN | WIN | LOSE | SAYONARA | | | |
| 6 | Dan | LOSE | LOSE | WIN | WIN | LOSE | LOSE | SAYONARA | | | | |
| 7 | Jamie | LOSE | LOSE | WIN | WIN | LOSE | SAYONARA | | | | | |
| 8 | Drew | LOSE | LOSE | WIN | WIN | SAYONARA | | | | | | |
| 9 | Bobaloo | WIN | WIN | LOSE | SAYONARA | | | | | | | |
| 10 | Debbie | WIN | WIN | SAYONARA | | | | | | | | |
| 11 | Yari | LOSE | SAYONARA | | | | | | | | | |
| 12 | Kimberly | SAYONARA | | | | | | | | | | |

The contestant was a member of the Green Tigers.
The contestant was a member of the Red Robots.
The contestant was a finalist and competed as an individual.
(OMEDETO) The contestant was the winner.
(SAYONARA) The contestant was the runner-up.
(WIN) The contestant was on the winning team and was immune from the Elimination challenge.
(LOSE) The contestant was on the losing team, but was not selected for the Elimination challenge.
(LOSE) The contestant was on the losing team and selected for the Elimination challenge, and won.
(SAYONARA) The contestant lost the Elimination Challenge and was eliminated.
(SAYONARA) The contestant finished last in an individual challenge and was eliminated.

== Ratings ==
| Ep # | Air Date | Rating | Share | 18–49 | Viewers | Weekly Rank |
|---|---|---|---|---|---|---|
| 1 | June 17 | TBA | TBA | 1.9/6 | 5.43 | 25^{t} |
| 2 | June 24 | 1.6 | 5 | 1.6/5 | 4.18 | 60^{t} |
| 3 | July 1 | TBA | TBA | TBA | 3.5 | 62 |
| 4 | July 8 | | | | | 69 |
| 5 | July 15 | | | | | 62^{t} |
| 6 | July 22 ^{1} | 1.4 | 4 | 1.0/4 | 3.84 | 55 |
| 7 | July 29 | 1.4 | 4 | 1.2/4 | 3.78 | 68^{t} |
| 8 | Aug. 5 | 2.2 | 4 | 1.4/4 | 3.76 | 61 |

^{t} – Tied.

^{1} Show was aired at 10 pm ET due to President Obama press conference that night.

The show faced three other reality contests: America's Got Talent on NBC, So You Think You Can Dance? on Fox, Hitched or Ditched on The CW through July 8 when repeats of America's Next Top Model replaced it and reruns of Criminal Minds on CBS. In the first week, it faced Law and Order on NBC; the reason the season started earlier (as opposed to the original July 8 date) was the date and time change of Mike Judge's The Goode Family to Fridays at 8:30 pm ET/PT due to lower than expected ratings on Wednesdays. On July 22, it ran against a repeat episode of CSI: NY on CBS and The Philanthropist on NBC.

== See also ==
- Main article
- Season 1 of ISaJGS
