= I Survived a Japanese Game Show season 1 =

I Survived a Japanese Game Show
- Season 1
- ABC's promotional logo for the first season of I Survived a Japanese Game Show.
- Starring: Tony Sano (TV host); Rome Kanda (Majide Host)

Release
- Original release: June 24 – August 6, 2008

Season chronology
- Next → Season 2

I Survived a Japanese Game Show is an American reality show that followed a group of Americans who leave the United States for Japan, where they compete in a Japanese style game show. Season one premiered on ABC on June 24, 2008. The show was hosted by Tony Sano. On August 6, 2008, financial representative, Justin Wood, was pronounced the winner. He won a cash prize of US$250,000 (JP¥25 million).

== Contestants ==
- Order of appearance in the opening credits: Andrew, Bilenda, Cathy, Ben, Darcy, Mary, Donnell, Olga, Justin and Meaghan.

Contestant	Original Teams	First Switch	Second Switch	Final Four	Finish
Darcy Sletager (Note: Darcy returned to the game after Ben forfeited due to illness.); Returned to game	Yellow; Penguins				1st eliminated (against Bilenda)
Ben Hughes (ベン); 44, Punxsutawney, Pennsylvania	Green; Monkeys				Left game due to illness
Olga Medvedev (オルガ); 26, Medford, Massachusetts	Green; Monkeys	Green; Monkeys			2nd eliminated (against Darcy)
Darcy Sletager (ダーシー); 31, Sandpoint, Idaho	Yellow; Penguins	Green; Monkeys			3rd eliminated (against Meaghan)
Mary Greenawalt (マリー); 23, Matthews, North Carolina	Green; Monkeys	Green; Monkeys			4th eliminated (against Donnell)
Cathy Nardone (キャシー); 21, Staten Island, New York	Yellow; Penguins	Yellow; Penguins	Green; Monkeys (Note: When the teams were uneven at the time, Cathy moved over to the opposite team Green Monkeys.)		5th eliminated (against Donnell)
Andrew Kelly-Hayes (アンドリュー); 28, Boston, Massachusetts	Yellow; Penguins	Yellow; Penguins	Yellow; Penguins		6th eliminated (against Bilenda)
Bilenda Madison (ベリンダ); 38, Charlotte, North Carolina	Yellow; Penguins	Yellow; Penguins	Yellow; Penguins	Final Four	7th eliminated, 4th place
Meaghan Cooper (ミーガン); 22, San Antonio, Texas	Green; Monkeys	Green; Monkeys	Green; Monkeys	Final Four	8th eliminated, 3rd place
Donnell Pitman (ドネル); 32, Chicago, Illinois	Green; Monkeys	Green; Monkeys	Green; Monkeys	Final Four	Runner-up
Justin Wood (ジャスティン); 24, Trussville, Alabama	Yellow; Penguins	Yellow; Penguins	Yellow; Penguins	Final Four	Winner

== List of episodes ==
ISaJGS 1
No. overall	No. in season	Title	Original release date	U.S. viewers (millions)
1	1	"Episode 1"	June 24, 2008	4.4
Ten American contestants arrived at Los Angeles International Airport was chosen by the producers, they met with the show's host, Tony Sano, informed them to send to Japan. These members were then assigned into two groups of five, Yellow Penguins and Green Monkeys. The initial members for the Yellow Penguins were Andrew, Bilenda, Cathy, Darcy and Justin, while the Green Monkeys have Ben, Donnell, Mary, Meaghan and Olga.: Team Challenge: Conveyor Restaurant (コンベ屋食堂; Conveyor Shokudō): One member from each team is designated as the eater, while the other four members will fill their helmet-mounted trays with flour and one mochi ball. One-by-one, each member must run up a treadmill to the eater, who must then eat the mochi without using their hands before hitting the buzzer to allow the next teammate to start; regardless, the teammate drops down on the treadmill, and falls into a large pile of flour. The team who eat the most mochi balls in four minutes wins.; Winning team and Reward: Green Monkeys (10); A helicopter tour of Tokyo.; Losing team and Punishment: Yellow Penguins (9); Pulling rickshaws.; Nominated for elimination game: Bilenda and Darcy; Elimination Challenge: Big Bugs Splat on Windshield (虫人間コンテスト; Mushi Ningen Kontesuto): Two members donned in bug suits jumps on a trampoline and attempt to place markers onto three separate targets on a target area that is designed as a car windshield. The first target carries 1-3 points for one jump, while the second has 4-6, and the third with 7-9. The member with a higher score after three rounds wins and the loser is eliminated with the Sayonara Mob sending them back home; if there is a tie after three rounds, a sudden-death tiebreaker will be played: both members performed one more jump until one scored higher than the other.; Winner Bilenda (16; 8 on tiebreaker); Eliminated: Darcy (16; 7 on tiebreaker)
2	2	"Episode 2"	July 1, 2008	3.6
Due to Ben's withdrawal from the competition, Darcy was reinstated from the show; as Ben was a member of the Green Monkeys, Darcy was assumed on the new team.: Team Challenge: Human Crane Finds Fluffy Bear (クマちゃんつかみ取り！; Kumachan Tsukamidori!): One team member is designated as a crane while three teammates assume the controls on each axis of the member's movement--each person running the controls would have their own pair of buttons for a different axis--in order for the crane to pick up and carry large stuffed bears into a chute. The team who carried the most bears after three minutes wins.; Winning team and Reward: Yellow Penguins (10); A Japanese spa treatment including a fish pedicure.; Losing team and Punishment: Green Monkeys (1); Working at a pachinko parlor.; Nominated for elimination game: Darcy and Olga; Elimination Challenge: Fight On, Mailman Taro (ガンバレ！郵便太郎; Ganbare! Yūbin Tarō): One contestant runs on a course to deliver packages into shaped mail-slots through a slippery corridor while a giant fan blows wind against them while the other contestant attempts to throw objects to hinder progress; the member with the most packages delivered in three minutes wins.; Winner: Darcy (6); Eliminated: Olga (5)
3	3	"Episode 3"	July 8, 2008	4.0
Team Challenge: Pedal Fast or Big Splash (サイクリングドボン; Cycling Dabon): Two players from each team rides on a tricycle on a moving treadmill, attempting to stay within a marked area in the middle of the treadmill. Two other players rode a pair of stationary bicycles attached to a motor which controls the speed of the treadmill. The faster the bikes are pedaled, the slower the treadmill moves. Behind the treadmill is a pool of iced water, and if either member fell off the treadmill, their turn ends and their timings will be accounted. The process is repeated for the other set of members, and the team with the most combined time spent in the marked area after both rounds wins.; Winning team and Reward: Yellow Penguins (38 seconds); A VIP tour of the Tsukiji fish market.; Losing team and Punishment: Green Monkeys (34 seconds); Rice farming; Nominated for elimination game: Darcy and Meaghan; Elimination Challenge: You Look Funny Stuck on the Wall (ぴったんこバンバン; Pittanko Bang Bang): Contestants donned in sticky suits, jumps off a trampoline and attempt to stick to the sticky wall within a body-shaped outline. The contestant whose outline more wins a point; the game is played on a Best-of-Five rounds, and the first contestant to score three points wins.; Winner: Meaghan (3); Eliminated: Darcy (0)
4	4	"Episode 4"	July 15, 2008	4.0
Team Challenge: Big Baby Go Boom (ねんねんころりYOおころりYO; Nen'nen Korori YO Okorori YO): Teams dressed as babies are fitted in a rotating crib. One at a time, members exit the crib and fill two cups with milk, then run an obstacle course which consist of spinning platforms, seesaws, and involve crawling; once they traverse the course and pour their milk into a giant baby bottle, the player must hit the buzzer so the next player can begin. Members must complete their course and are not allowed to go back for a refill. The three minute time limit begins when the crib stops spinning for the first time, and the team with more milk in their bottle after the time limit wins.; Winning team and Reward: Yellow Penguins; A private soba noodle making lesson.; Losing team and Punishment: Green Monekys; Shucking clams.; Nominated for elimination game: Donnell and Mary; Elimination Challenge: Big Chicken Butt Scramble! (チキンと割りまSHOW; Chicken towarima Show): Contestants have to be covered in oil and then slide into a pile of chicken feathers to coat, then using their rears to break as many eggs as possible within two minutes. The clock starts after the player goes down the slide. The player who breaks the most eggs wins.; Winner Donnell (11); Eliminated: Mary (10)
5	5	"Episode 5"	July 22, 2008	3.2
Due to an uneven number of teams following Green Monkey's three consecutive defeats; Cathy switched to the Green Monkeys to even the members.: Team Challenge: Sticky Sticky Bang Bang (ハリツキバンバン; Haritsuki Bang Bang): The title is a homage on a musical novel Chitty Chitty Bang Bang. One team member is suspended from a rope wearing a sticky suit as another teammate throws sticky balls, and the other shoots tennis balls from an air gun, both attempting to stick balls to the suit. Two players from the opposing team hold ropes attached to the member to try to move them left and right during the game. The team with the most balls stuck to their partner's sticky suit in two minutes wins.; Winning team and Reward: Yellow Penguins (24); A visit to a Shinto shrine.; Losing team and Punishment: Green Monkeys (7); Making Mochi balls for the game show audience.; Nominated for elimination game: Cathy and Donnell; Elimination Challenge: You Swing and Hope for the Best (あいたら負けよ！ジャンプップ！！; Aitara makeyo! Jump!!): Each player begins on a platform facing a wall with seven doors, attempting to swing onto one of three solid doors. The other four doors are breakable in which actors (dressed as a gorilla and a panda wielding a padded stick and a giant powder puff respectively) would randomly attack the player to slow down. Once they landed on the floor, they have to go back to the platform and swing again until they swing onto all three solid doors; once all three solid doors were found, they have to press a buzzer to finish the task. Players competed separately, and the player with a faster time wins.; Winner Donnell (1:07); Eliminated: Cathy (2:05)
6	6	"Episode 6"	July 29, 2008	3.4
Team Challenge: You Stand Still! No, You Stand Still! (くらくら鍵パッカン; Kurakura Key Packan): Two teammates, one dressed in comedic drag as a bride and the other as a groom – start out spinning in chairs to get dizzy. After the chairs stop spinning, they have to cross a narrow balance beam over a pool of flour and a pair of spinning floor tiles. They cross to the opposite chair where one player gets a set of keys while the other gets a heart-shaped belt with a lock. The latter player puts the belt on and the two return to the center spinning tiles. While standing on the spinning tiles, the player with the keys must find the correct one to unlock the belt, and then both must return to their original chairs. The team that completes this challenge in the fastest time wins.; Winning team and Reward: Green Monkeys (1:04); overnight stay at Grand Hyatt hotel.; Losing team and Punishment: Yellow Penguins (1:09); overnight stay at a capsule hotel.; Nominated for elimination game: Andrew and Blienda; Elimination Challenge: Clothes On! Clothes Off! (激突！生着替え; Gekitotsu! Seikigae): Each player races inside a dressing room to dress in a given costume modeled by a mannequin, in order of play: A construction worker wearing a helmet, a red devil with two horns, and a Sweet Lolita Harajuku Girl. The player with the fastest total time after three rounds wins.; Winner Blienda (3:02); Eliminated: Andrew (3:15); Note: A third player, ostensibly the defending Majide costume-changing champion Yuji Kamada, also competed in the game alongside the two contestants. Allegedly, if one of the Americans beat Kamada, they would win a bonus prize (which was never shown since Kamada was faster than the two players). However, Kamada was actually played by twins, the famous Japanese comedy duo, The Touch (ザ・たっち; Za Touch). One was already dressed in the required costume, and the two switched places via a secret door in their change room. This was revealed as a prank on the contestants after the second round.
7	7	"Finale"	August 6, 2008	2.9
The final four contestants were informed that the teams will be dissolved and they would be competing the final three challenges as individuals, with the last placed contestant facing elimination.: Individual Challenge 1: Making New Friends in Japan (世界に広げようムチャぶりの輪！; Sekai ni Hirogeyou Mucha-buri no Wa!): Each contestant crosses all around Tokyo to accomplish five tasks, all in the following order below, before they could return to the studio. The last contestant to complete the tasks and return to the studio is eliminated. These tasks were: 1. Get someone to draw a handlebar moustache on the player's face with a marker; 2. Get someone to take a Polaroid photo of the player being kissed by another stranger; 3. Get someone to dress up in a provided Statue of Liberty costume; 4. Get a business card from someone; and 5. Get three people to do the wave.; Eliminated: Bilenda; Individual Challenge 2: Squishy Squishy (ザ・スポンジマン; Za Spongeman): Each contestant is donned in a squishy suit and gets into a shallow pool of water to absorb the water. They then run into a maze, while their opponents each swing a spiked ball at the contestant; at the end of the maze is a wedge-shaped pair of walls where the contestant squeezes out the water which drains into a container. Contestants can go back to the course if time permits, and the contestant accumulating the least water after three minutes is eliminated.; Eliminated: Meaghan; Prior to the final game, the remaining two players witnessed a ceremony in front of a large crowd, and were awarded a pair of round trip tickets to Tokyo by then-Minister and Osaka Representative Yasuhide Nakayama, expressing gratitude on understanding the culture of Japan.: Individual Challenge 3: Super Majide (本気で！全部のせ; Majide! Zenbunose): The final two contestants competed head-to-head on an obstacle course combined with various challenges encountered throughout the season. The contestant gets dizzy in spinning chairs, then traverse across a narrow path over a pool of water while riding a tricycle. If they fell off, they had to swim to the end of the obstacle and continue from there. Next they must crack six eggs using their rear ends, then crawl through a pile of flour, and climb up an inclined sticky wall using sticky grips. Then they must slide down a pole, eat three mochi balls, then swing on a rope into one of five doors until they find the only breakable door that could break through a room with a buzzer in it. The first contestant to hit the buzzer will be crowned the winner of the $250,000 (¥25 million) prize and greeted by the Omedeto Mob (Sayonara Mob dressed in white).; Winner: Justin; Runner-up: Donnell

== Game results ==
Elimination chart
No.	Name	1	2	3	4	5	6	7		
1	Justin	LOSE	WIN	WIN	WIN	WIN	LOSE	SAFE	SAFE	OMEDETO
2	Donnell	WIN	LOSE	LOSE	LOSE	LOSE	WIN	SAFE	SAFE	SAYONARA
3	Meaghan	WIN	LOSE	LOSE	LOSE	LOSE	WIN	SAFE	SAYONARA	
4	Bilenda	LOSE	WIN	WIN	WIN	WIN	LOSE	SAYONARA		
5	Andrew	LOSE	WIN	WIN	WIN	WIN	SAYONARA			
6	Cathy	LOSE	WIN	WIN	WIN	SAYONARA				
7	Mary	WIN	LOSE	LOSE	SAYONARA					
8	Darcy	SAYONARA	LOSE	SAYONARA						
9	Olga	WIN	SAYONARA							
10	Ben	QUIT								

The contestant was a member of the Green Monkeys.
The contestant was a member of the Yellow Penguins.
The contestant was a finalist and competed as an individual.
(OMEDETO) The contestant was the winner.
(SAYONARA) The contestant was the runner-up.
(WIN) The contestant was on the winning team and was immune from the Elimination challenge.
(LOSE) The contestant was on the losing team, but was not selected for the Elimination challenge.
(LOSE) The contestant was on the losing team and selected for the Elimination challenge, and won.
(SAYONARA) The contestant lost the Elimination Challenge and was eliminated.
(SAYONARA) The contestant finished last in an individual challenge and was eliminated.
(QUIT) The contestant withdrew from the competition.

== Ratings ==
Ep #	Air Date	Rating	Share	18–49	Viewers	Weekly Rank
1	July 24	4.4	7	3.1/9 (#2)	8.03 (#2)	10
2	July 1	3.6	6	2.6/8 (#3)	6.33 (#4)	28
3	July 8	4.0	7	2.8/8 (#3)	6.83 (#4)	26^{t}
4	July 15	4.0	7	2.4/7 (#3)	5.82 (#4)	31^{t}
5	July 23	3.2	5	2.2/7 (#3)	5.74 (#4)	31^{t}
6	July 30	3.4	6	2.3 (#4)	5.84	30
7	August 6	2.9	5	1.9	4.50	42^{t}

^{t} – Tied.

The show went against America's Got Talent on NBC, Big Brother 10 on CBS, reruns of House on Fox, except on July 15 when the MLB All-Star Game was telecast, and repeats of Reaper on The CW.

== See also ==
- I Survived a Japanese Game Show
- Season Two of ISaJGS
