= Yoshi Amao =

Japanese actor, comedian, emcee, and martial artist

Yoshi Amao (ヨシ 天尾) is a Japanese actor, comedian, MC, and martial artist based in New York City. He is the emcee for the hit reality TV game show Big In Japan on air throughout Europe. From 2013 until 2014 he was the host of the YTV/Disney XD television game show, Japanizi: Going, Going, Gong!

== Early life and career ==
Amao was born in Osaka, Japan, and grew up in Nara. While a student at Osaka City University, he started to learn acting and traditional Japanese dance. His career as an emcee also started while a college student. After graduating from college, Yoshi Amao worked in computer sales for four years while concurrently worked as a radio personality at MBS Radio in Osaka.

Yoshi Amao is well known as the feature host of the highly rated TV series Samurai Sportsman premiered in 2004 on Outdoor Life Network (later known as Versus). On this show, Yoshi is seen trying American traditional outdoor sports, such as bass fishing, duck hunting, axe throwing, off-road biking and rodeo (bareback riding, bull riding, and steer wrestling). At the same time, Yoshi teaches his samurai spirit and sword technique to each of the outdoor experts he worked with. In 2004, Amao was invited as a guest on Late Night with Conan O'Brien on NBC where he discussed samurai philosophy and blew away the audience with his unique sword technique.

In 1999, he started to assist a samurai sword fighting workshop for Rome Kanda, who is host of the Majide game show within a show on the American version of Big in Japan, I Survived a Japanese Game Show. After studying sword fighting more under the sword master, Tahei Waki, he started his own samurai sword fighting class and formed a sword fighting performance group, "Samurai Sword Soul". Samurai Sword Soul is seen performing around New York City, including at the annual Sakura Matsuri held at Brooklyn Botanic Garden, where he is the emcee.

Yoshi Amao's other credits include the Budweiser commercial (Wasabi Version), which was selected as "Best Commercial of the Year" in 2000; principal character and sword fighting choreographer for the play Deadly She-Wolf Assassin at Armageddon (Kozue Ookami) at Japan Society in 2005, Philadelphia in 2006, and at La Mama theater in 2013; and main samurai for the Monday Night Football promo on ESPN in 2006.

On April 1, 2009, as an April Fools' prank, Yoshi Amao surprised and charmed American audiences by standing in for regular host Jimmy Fallon on Late Night, which succeeded Conan O'Brien's hosting tenure. He then hosted Japanizi: Going, Going, Gong! on YTV and Disney XD. He voiced Anime Yogi in Jellystone!.

Amao is a member of Amaterasu Za, a Japanese language theatre company in New York City founded by Ako. Amao portrays Sera opposite Ako and Hiroyuki Sanada in the FX television series Shōgun.
