= Kayabuki =

In Japanese, Kayabuki may refer to:

- Kayabuki, a style of thatched roof house in Japan; see Iya Valley
- Yoko Kayabuki, a character from the Ghost in the Shell media franchise

== See also ==
- Kayabukiya Tavern, a traditional-style Japanese "sake-house" restaurant in Utsunomiya, Japan
