= Japanizi: Going, Going, Gong! =

- Genre: Japanese Game Show; Reality game show
- Written by: Lisa Brooke
- Directed by: Rene Dowhaniuk
- Starring: Yoshi Amao; Masayuki Hashimoto; Bart Rochon; John Palmeiri
- Country of origin: Canada
- Original languages: English; French; Japanese
- No. of seasons: 1
- No. of episodes: 40

Production
- Executive producers: Matthew Hornburg; Mark J.W. Bishop; Tim Crescenti; David Sidebotham
- Producer: Susan Edwards
- Production locations: Toronto, Ontario, Canada
- Editors: Danielle Jones; William Mitchell; Michael Kee
- Running time: 22 minutes
- Production company: marblemedia

Original release
- Network: YTV; Vrak
- Release: 5 November 2013 – 20 August 2014

Related
- Skatoony

Japanizi "Going, Going, Gong!" ("ゴーイング、ゴーイング、ゴング！") is a Canadian children's physical game show with a Japanese motif where contestants compete with a teammate against other teams as they tackle obstacles and challenges to test their mental capabilities, strength, endurance, and smarts. The series first aired on YTV starting 5 November 2013 and in the United States on Disney XD as of 4 November 2013.

Yoshi Amao hosts, with Masayuki Hashimoto as "Judge Masa". The show's characters include a group of ninjas led by the English-translator ninja Shinobi; and Glasses Man, who is one of the audience members.

Japanizi is a Canadian adaptation of the ABC reality show I Survived a Japanese Game Show, originally called Big in Japan, and was created by David Sidebotham. The studio-based kids' game show makes use of zany costumes, conveyor belts, dizzy chairs, giant fans and velcro walls with themed competitions and more. The Japanese language is incorporated with the show, but it is mostly English.

Japanizi is produced by Toronto-based marblemedia, the production company behind the game shows Splatalot and The Adrenaline Project, makes children’s programs for television, web and mobile.

On 20 August 2014, YTV & Disney XD dismissed increasing rumors that Japanizi: Going, Going, Gong! had been cancelled, reporting rather that renewal of the series is undetermined as of the present.

About the show: 4 teams take on 3 courses, but only 1 team can win the impossibly large trophy. Ninja Shinobi also gives them a prize, which is not real, but makes the audience laugh.

== Contestants ==
The contestants for the show are adolescents aged 12–16 from across Canada.

== Challenges ==
This is a listing of the various challenges performed on the show.

- Hungry Man Pizza Drop: Teams, dressed as slices of pizza, must take turns carrying stacks of pizza boxes across a tilting bridge over a pool and set them up on tables on the opposite side, while the show's "ninjas" throw balls to try and knock the players into the pool.
- Happy Penguin Fun/Quick Slick Tobogganing Trick: Teams are dressed in penguin suits (or placed in a toboggan). One at a time—and with aid of one of the show's "ninjas"—they slide down a ramp, trying stop on a bullseye-style target at the end of the ramp without overshooting and landing in the pool. Players score 5 points if their midsection touches the outermost red ring, 10 points if it touches the center white ring, and 15 points if it touches the innermost blue ring. No points are scored if the player fails to reach the target or overshoots and lands in the pool. If there is a tie one player from a team will slide down the ramp aiming to stop on the target. The person closest to the bullseye wins.
- Human Sticky Jump: Teams are dressed in Velcro suits. One member from each team must then run down a ramp towards a Velcro wall with an outline pattern pictured, jump on a small trampoline and try to land on the wall to match up the wall's pattern as closely as possible. Judge Masa decides which player best filled the pattern. The team who scores 2 out of 3 jumps first wins.
- Fish and Slips: Teams work together carrying giant fish from a central supply on one end of the course to their collection boxes on the other, battling a greased floor, gale-force winds, as well as objects thrown by the show's "ninjas". If there is a tie, Judge Masa counts a type of fish.
- Silly Soccer Penalty Kick: One at a time, each team member tries to kick as many soccer balls into a goal as possible. The trick? They're wearing special goggles that distort their vision and aiming ability.
- Lucky Miso Noodle Party: Teammates alternate collecting soup in their bowl and transporting it from one side of the course to the other and transferring it to a collection container. Falls force the players to return to the start and try again.
- Teazy Does It: Contestants take turns on a moving conveyor belt, while attempting to serve cups of tea to guests. As the cups fill the conveyor belt speeds up. The aim is to fill as many teacups as possible before falling off the conveyor belt.
- Most Extreme Froggy Hop: Teammates alternate carrying "froggy eggs" across small spinning platforms, depositing them in the bowls on the other side of the course. If there is a tie they are to pop the eggs they have collected. If there is green goo it is worth a point. If there is blue goo it is worth nothing.
- Fine Feathered Frenzy: Dressed as ducks, teams alternate carrying golden "duck eggs" across a tilting bridge over a pool, while avoiding balls thrown by the show's "ninjas". If there is a tie, the teams must pick out an egg and open it to reveal a chicken or a snake. If it is a snake they are eliminated, but if it is a chicken they are still in the game.
- Bubble Tea Bungee Bungle: Teammates become Chef and Waiter for this stunt. Each is tethered by a bungee cord to a central platform. The Chef must reach one end of the course and pour cups of "bubble tea", then hand them over to the Waiter, who must serve them to "customers" on the other end. If there is a tie Judge Masa pours the team’s cups of bubble tea into a beaker.
- Cutting Ties: One teammate sits above a tank of water while the other stands before a series of colored tubes. The standing teammates must one at a time choose which tubes to cut until one finally cuts the tube that dunks their partner.
- Baby Go Boom Boom: Teams are dressed in baby costumes and are tied back to back. They must grab pacifiers with their mouths and deposit them in plates that the ninjas (who are also dressed like babies and are in cribs) are holding.
- Train Ring A Ding: Teams must dunk their face in whipped cream to find teething rings, while lifting a balloon of a train track before the train comes and pops it. If that happens to a contestant, they cannot play on. If it happens to both, it's game over.
- Filthy Fortune: Teams are dressed into their swimmers and look for coins on the bottom in a pool of toys. Starfish coins are counted as points. Snail coins are worth nothing.
- Multi-Leg Octodash: All for teams will run three - legged and carry seawater from a big bowl to the smaller one.
- Masterpiece Mayhem: One contestant from each team will provide paint while the other on a moving conveyor belt, attempts to paint a numbers picture. The conveyor belt will increase speed and artists will have to fall back to the black line blacker in order to change colours.
- Lobster Mouse Chopstick Fun: One contestant from each team dressed as a lobster will be suspended over a pit of battery-operated mice. Using oversized chopsticks teams will pick up as many mice as they can.
- Worst Subway Ride Ever!: The game is played in two rounds. Round 1: All four teams stand on a wobbly platform, grabbing hold of the handles above. As objects are thrown by the ninjas. The first two teams to fall of or touch the ground a little, they will complete in a sudden death elimination round.
- Tokyo Belt Bike Race: All three teams race head to head over several rounds. One contestant from each team will ride a small bicycle on a conveyor belt, attempting to hit the buzzer with their head. When the buzzer is pressed it increases the speed on the other contestant’s conveyor belt. The object is for the contestant’s opponents to be dumped of the conveyor belt before the contestant does.
- Inconvenient Bubble Catch: Partners take turns suiting up in large bubble orbs, trying to catch balls fired in the air by the ninjas. The orbs are extremely bouncy, so a collision with another team could be costly.
