= Carrie Hamilton =

American dramatist (1963–2002)

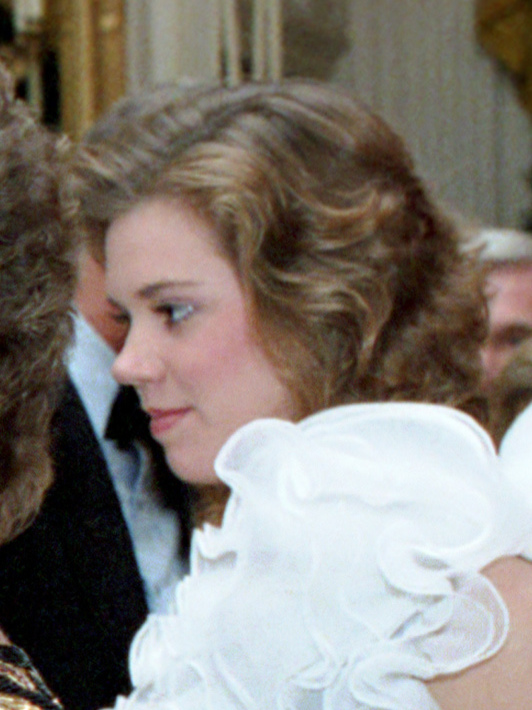
- Hamilton at the White House in 1983
- Born: Carrie Louise Hamilton; December 5, 1963; New York City, U.S.
- Died: January 20, 2002 (aged 38); Los Angeles, California, U.S.
- Burial place: Westwood Village Memorial Park Cemetery
- Education: Pepperdine University
- Occupations: Actress; playwright; singer
- Known for: Fame; Tokyo Pop
- Spouse: Mark Templin (m. 1994; div. 1998)
- Parent(s): Joe Hamilton; Carol Burnett
- Relatives: Erin Hamilton (sister); Kipp Hamilton (aunt)

Carrie Louise Hamilton (December 5, 1963 – January 20, 2002) was an American actress, playwright and singer.

== Biography ==
Hamilton was a daughter of comedian Carol Burnett and producer Joe Hamilton. Hamilton worked in a number of productions for film, stage, television and video. She took the role of Reggie Higgins in the TV version of the musical Fame for the fifth and sixth seasons (1985–1987), and portrayed the role of Maureen Johnson in the first national tour of the stage musical Rent to considerable acclaim. She also studied music and acting at Pepperdine University in Malibu, California. One of her films was Tokyo Pop (1988), in which she played an American singer who journeys to Japan. There, she found a relationship with both a singer (played by Diamond Yukai also known as Yutaka Tadokoro) and a band who made it into the Tokyo pop charts Top Ten. She performed several songs in the film. In 1991 she was a guest musician on the band Ugly Kid Joe's "As Ugly as They Wanna Be" album, playing piano on the track "Everything About You." In 1992, Hamilton had a minor role in the live-action movie Cool World.

Hamilton married musician Mark Templin in 1994 on the same sound stage where The Carol Burnett Show was videotaped. The couple divorced in 1998.

Hamilton occasionally appeared on television with her mother. In 1987, Burnett guest-starred in an episode of Fame titled "Reggie and Rose". The pair co-starred in a 1988 TV movie titled Hostage. They appeared on five episodes of Family Feud in 1995, competing with Hamilton's husband Mark Templin and mother-in-law Dalia Ward against a team led by Betty White. In 1997, they starred on an episode of Touched by an Angel titled "The Comeback". Hamilton played an aspiring Broadway star whose mother (Burnett) had also made a run for Broadway fame, but failed (due to a dirty trick on the part of her conniving best friend, played by Rita Moreno). In 1999, Hamilton starred in a popular sixth-season episode of The X-Files, titled "Monday". She played the role of Pam, the girlfriend of a would-be bank robber, who is forced to relive the same day over and over.

Hamilton worked with her mother to adapt Burnett's memoir, One More Time, for the stage play Hollywood Arms, but she did not live long enough to see it produced.

To honor her daughter, Carol Burnett published a book called Carrie and Me: A Mother-Daughter Love Story. This was released on April 8, 2014, and became a New York Times bestselling memoir. People magazine described it as a “loving, poignant” tribute book to Burnett’s eldest daughter.

Hamilton had a three-year period of heavy drug and alcohol abuse that she successfully overcame by the time she was 15. Except for a brief relapse at 17, she remained drug- and alcohol-free for the remainder of her life.

== Death ==
Hamilton died from pneumonia as a complication of lung cancer that spread to her brain in Los Angeles, California, on January 20, 2002, at age 38, and is interred in the Westwood Village Memorial Park Cemetery.

== Legacy ==
In July 2006, the former Balcony Theatre of the Pasadena Playhouse, where Burnett is a board member, was rededicated as the Carrie Hamilton Theatre in Hamilton's memory.

On March 23, 2010, Carol Burnett participated in establishing the Anaheim University Carrie Hamilton Entertainment Institute with Anaheim University Vice President for Academic Affairs Dr. David Nunan.

== Filmography ==
=== Film ===
Year	Title	Role	Notes
1988	Tokyo Pop	Wendy Reed	
1989	Shag	Nadine	
1992	Cool World	Comic bookstore cashier	

=== Television ===
Year	Title	Role	Notes
1985	Love Lives On	Kathy	Television film
1986–1987	Fame	Reggie Higgins	Main role- 29 episodes
1988	Hostage	Bonnie Lee Hopkin	Television film
1988	Knightwatch	Tracy Hood	Episode: "Hard Day's Knight"
1989	Single Women, Married Men	April Clay	Television film
1990	Checkered Flag	Alex Cross	Television film
1990	Murder, She Wrote	Geraldine Stone	Episode: "Trials and Tribulations"
1991	Equal Justice	Jillian Weeks	Episode: "Sleeping With the Enemy"
1991	Beverly Hills, 90210	Sky	Episode: "Stand (Up)! and Deliver"
1991	Thirtysomething	Callie Huffs	Episode: "Melissa in Wonderland"
1991	A Mother's Justice	Debbie	Television film
1995	Walker, Texas Ranger	Mary Beth McCall	Episodes: "Whitewater: Part 1" "Whitewater: Part 2"
1997	Touched by an Angel	Allison Bennett	Episode: "The Comeback" this episode also starred her mom, Carol Burnett
1998	Brooklyn South	Gerrie Fallon-Scranton	Episode: "Fools Russian"
1999	The X-Files	Pam	Episode: "Monday"
1999	P.1	Alarm	9 minute short
2000	The Pretender	Jill Arnold	Episode: "Junk"

== Soundtracks ==
- "Where Does the Night Begin?" (on Fame)
- "Always You" (on Fame)
- "Who Put the Bomp" (on Fame)
- "The Shoop Shoop Song" (on Fame)
- "Some Day, Some Way" (on Fame)
- "We Are the Ones" (on Fame)
- "Catch Me I'm Falling Fast" (on Fame)
- "Look and Learn" (on Fame)
- "It's Love I'm After, After All" (on Fame)
- "East of Eden" (on Fame)
- "Only Love Will Hold Fast" (on Fame)
- "We Have the Right" (on Fame)
- "Think" (on Fame)
- "See Your Face Again" (on Fame)
- "He Looks Like Romeo" (on Fame)
- "A Couple of Swells" (on Fame)
- "(You Make Me Feel Like a) Natural Woman" (on Tokyo Pop)
- "Do You Believe in Magic?" (on Tokyo Pop)
- "Never Forget" (on Tokyo Pop)
- "Home on the Range" (on Tokyo Pop)
- "Diff'rent God" (music video)
- "I Am a Boy" (music video)
