= Shadow Play (The Twilight Zone, 1959) =

- The Twilight Zone episode
- Episode no.: Season 2 Episode 26
- Directed by: John Brahm
- Written by: Charles Beaumont
- Based on: "Träumerei" by Charles Beaumont
- Production code: 173-3657
- Original air date: May 5, 1961

Guest appearances
- Dennis Weaver as Adam Grant; Harry Townes as District Attorney Henry Ritchie; Wright King as Paul Carson; Bernie Hamilton as Coley; William Edmonson as Jiggs; Anne Barton as Carol Ritchie; Tommy Nello as Phillips; Mack Williams as Father Beaman; Gene Roth as Judge

Episode chronology
← Previous "The Silence"	Next → "The Mind and the Matter"
- The Twilight Zone (1959 TV series) (season 2)

"Shadow Play" is episode 62 of the American television anthology series The Twilight Zone. It originally aired on May 5, 1961 on CBS.

== Opening narration ==
Adam Grant, a nondescript kind of man, found guilty of murder and sentenced to the electric chair. Like every other criminal caught in the wheels of justice, he's scared, right down to the marrow of his bones. But it isn't prison that scares him, the long, silent nights of waiting, the slow walk to the little room, or even death itself. It's something else that holds Adam Grant in the hot, sweaty grip of fear, something worse than any punishment this world has to offer, something found only in – The Twilight Zone.

== Plot ==
A jury finds Adam Grant guilty of murder, and the judge sentences him to death. Grant laughs with despair, then exclaims that he refuses to die again. He frantically tries to tell those present – including district attorney Henry Ritchie and newspaper editor Paul Carson – that he is dreaming, and if he is executed they will all cease to exist. Locked up on death row, Grant describes the experience of dying in the electric chair, to fellow prisoner Jiggs in graphic detail.

Later, a drunk Carson shows up at Ritchie's house. He has been speaking to Grant, and fears the convict might be telling the truth. Ritchie's wife Carol, annoyed by Carson's outburst, goes to bed early, telling her husband that there are steaks almost ready in the oven. Carson argues to Ritchie that their lives seem impossibly perfect and encourages him to explore his own doubts.

Back at the prison, Grant waits for Ritchie to arrive, noting the implausibility of Jiggs having a watch to tell him the time. Ritchie comes, and they have a conversation Grant has claimed to have had before with other DAs, enough times to mouth the man's words as he says them. Ritchie asks Grant why he cares about dying if it's all a dream, and Grant explains that he's tormented by having this same nightmare every night. As Ritchie leaves, Grant tries to prove that they're in a dream, by predicting that the steak Ritchie's wife had cooked will be something else. Ritchie rushes home and finds a roast in the oven.

Jiggs suggests to Grant that he try to get a psychiatric exemption from execution. To prove his sanity to Jiggs, Grant points out logical errors accepted as normal by those around him, such as the fact that his trial, sentencing, and execution are happening on the same day. Meanwhile, at Ritchie's home, he and Carson wait for midnight, debating the likelihood that the execution time matches the one shown in movies.

As Grant waits to be taken to the electric chair, Father Beaman visits him. Grant vaguely recalls him as a real priest who died when he was a boy. He further remembers that Carson is really the young priest who replaced Beaman but struggles to place Ritchie. Carson finally persuades Ritchie that either Grant is right or that he's insane, so he calls the governor for a stay of execution. But the call comes seconds too late, Grant is executed, and the world blinks out.

Grant finds himself back in the courtroom. He is being convicted and sentenced to death for murder again. The same people surround him in the courtroom, but their identities and roles have changed: Jiggs is now the judge, Carson is the jury foreman, Phillips is Grant's public defender.

== Closing narration ==
We know that a dream can be real, but who ever thought that reality could be a dream? We exist, of course, but, but how, in what way? As we believe, as flesh-and-blood human beings, or are we simply parts of someone's feverish, complicated nightmare? Think about it, and then ask yourself, do you live here, in this country, in this world, or do you live, instead, – in The Twilight Zone?

== Production notes ==
Although no source material appears on screen, the episode is likely adapted from writer Charles Beaumont's short story "Träumerei" (which roughly translates from the German as "daydream" or "reverie") which originally appeared in the February, 1956 issue of Infinity Science Fiction. Beaumont's teleplay features passages taken wholly and unchanged from his earlier story.

== Adaptations ==
This episode was remade under the same title as part of the 1980s series in which Peter Coyote played Adam Grant.

It was also adapted for radio under the same title as part of The Twilight Zone Radio Dramas in which Ernie Hudson played Adam Grant.

== See also ==
- "12:01 P.M."
- Allegory of the Cave
- Zhuangzi dreamed he was a butterfly
- Dark City
- End Day
- Groundhog Day
- Edge of Tomorrow
- Haunter
- "Monday", an episode of The X-Files
