= Fran Rubel Kuzui =

American film director and producer

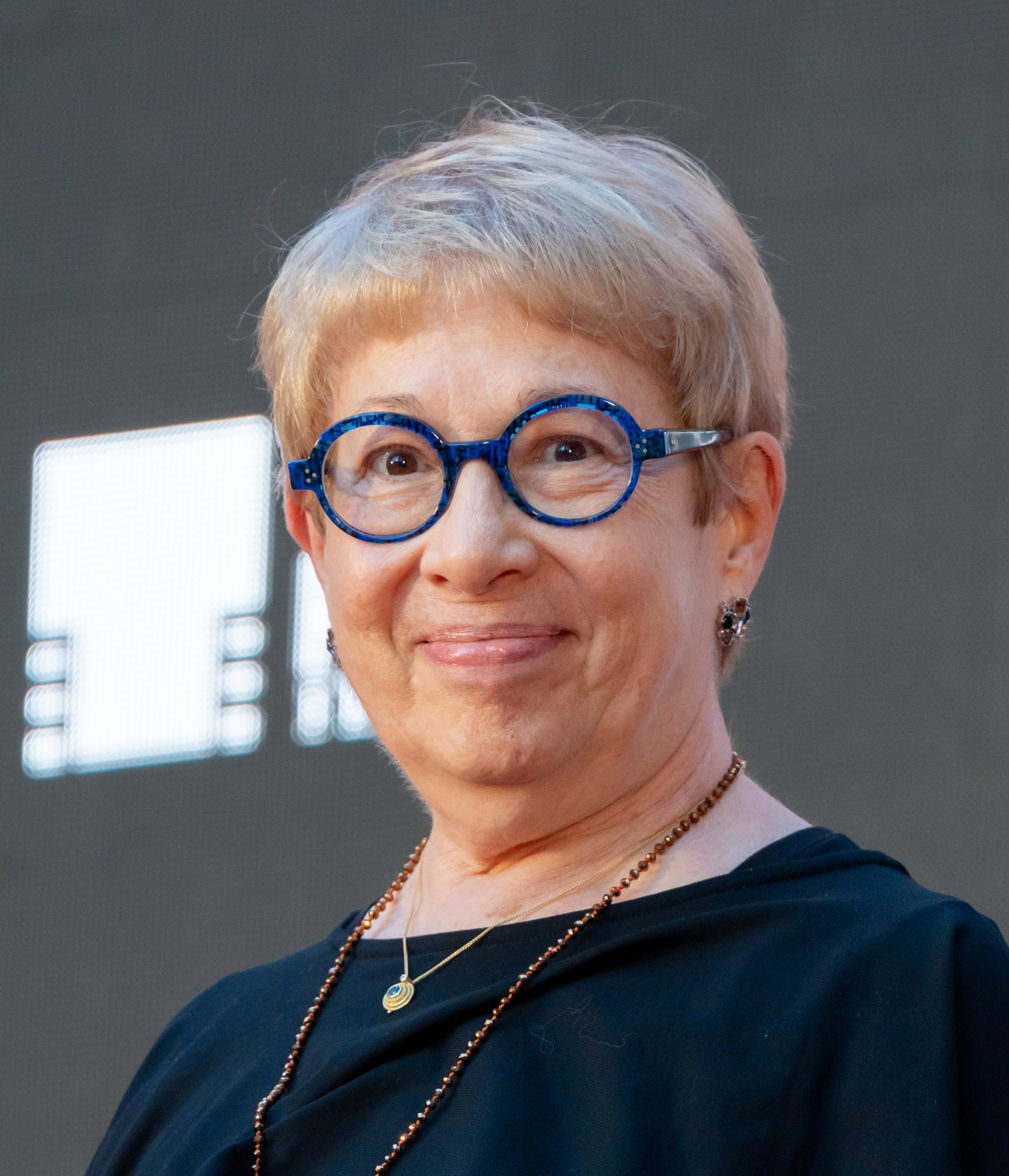
- Kuzui in 2023
- Born: United States
- Education: New York University
- Occupations: Film director; film producer; script supervisor
- Years active: 1988–present
- Spouse: Kaz Kuzui

Fran Rubel Kuzui is an American film director and producer. She directed the films Tokyo Pop (1988) and Buffy the Vampire Slayer (1992). She also produced the films Orgazmo (1997) and Telling Lies in America (1997).

== Early life and education ==
Kuzui received her master's degree in film from New York University. Afterwards, she worked as a production manager for PBS and then as a script supervisor for feature films. She met her future husband Kaz Kuzui in 1977 on the set of a Japanese film, Proof of the Man, on which she was a script supervisor and he was first AD. They got married a year later, and together they formed Kuzui Enterprises, an independent film distributor that distributes U.S. films in Japan and Japanese films in the U.S.

== Career ==
Kuzui's first film was 1988's Tokyo Pop, which she co-wrote with Lynn Grossman and directed. The movie was shown at the 1988 Cannes Film Festival and received critical acclaim for its depiction of an American woman trying to make sense of the Japanese youth culture.

She is best known as the director of the 1992 film Buffy the Vampire Slayer (which was the basis for the television series). She discovered the screenplay of writer Joss Whedon, expanded the Buffy character with him, and together with producer Kaz Kuzui put together the financing to produce the picture. Kuzui served as an executive producer on the TV series and its spin-off Angel, having packaged Buffy along with Kaz Kuzui, Sandollar TV's Gail Berman and Sandy Gallin.

In 1997, Kuzui began working with Trey Parker and Matt Stone and produced their film Orgazmo. The Kuzuis also localized and distributed the duo's TV series South Park in Japan. Kuzui Enterprises was among the financiers for Orgazmo and Telling Lies in America.

The Kuzuis worked with artist Keith Haring to establish Pop Shop Tokyo, an art project recognized by museums around the world. Kuzui was friends with Haring at the time of the opening of his shop, and she noticed the similarities to their names. When she expressed this to Haring, he offered to do the titles for her movie.

Since 2000, Kuzui has lived in Tokyo. Kuzui continued to produce films with her husband on a limited basis while simultaneously running their distribution company. The pair often travels back and forth from America and Japan, and worldwide for film festivals. In 2003, the Kuzuis were among the executive producers for the Thai-Japanese film Last Life in the Universe. In 2009, Kuzui reported that herself and her husband were winding down with their film distribution activities, and were looking to direct one last film.

In 2018, it was reported that the Kuzuis were involved with the development of a reboot of Buffy.

Kuzui was a contributing writer at the Nikkei Asian Review and Tokyo bureau chief for Culinary Backstreets.

== Feature films ==
Year	Title	Director	Writer	Producer
1988	Tokyo Pop	Yes	Yes	No
1992	Buffy the Vampire Slayer	Yes	No	No
1997	Orgazmo	No	No	Yes
1997	Telling Lies in America	No	No	Yes

== Bibliography ==
- Bfi. “‘We Inadvertently Began the Hip-Hop Movement in Japan’: Fran Rubel Kuzui on the Return of Her 80s Indie Gem Tokyo Pop.” BFI, BFI, 16 May 2025, www.bfi.org.uk/interviews/fran-rubel-kuzui-tokyo-pop.
- Nash, Cara. “Unsung Auteurs: Fran Rubel Kuzui.” FilmInk, 1 Dec. 2022, www.filmink.com.au/unsung-auteurs-fran-rubel-kuzui/.
- “Fran Rubel Kuzui.” Wide Angle / Closeup: Interview with Director Fran Rubel Kuzui, www.wideanglecloseup.com/kuzui.html#:~:text=Excerpts%20from%20this%20interview%20appeared,Japan%20and%20the%20United%20States. Accessed 24 Nov. 2025.
- Robinson, Gwen. “'I trust the universe to tell me where to be': My Favourite Home: Fran Rubel Kuzui.” Financial Times: London (UK), 24, Jan. 2009.
- Insdorf, Annette. “Women Film Directors Make a Strong Comeback.” New York Times, 24 Apr. 1988.
- Rhodes, Joe. “MOVIES ON LOCATION Eeeeyew . . . Gross. Where's My Wooden Stake? `Buffy the Vampire Slayer' turns the table on teen horror films, with a heroic damsel, a hunk in distress and, says the director, some serious issues that go for the jugular: [Home Edition].” Los Angeles Times, 31 May 1992.
