= Monday (The X-Files) =

- The X-Files episode
- Episode no.: Season 6 Episode 14
- Directed by: Kim Manners
- Written by: Vince Gilligan; John Shiban
- Production code: 6ABX15
- Original air date: February 28, 1999
- Running time: 45 minutes

Guest appearances
- Mitch Pileggi as Assistant Director Walter Skinner; Carrie Hamilton as Pam; Darren E. Burrows as Bernard Oates; Monique Burrows as Head Teller; Suanne Spoke as Woman Customer; Arlene Pileggi as Skinner's Secretary; Mik Scriba as Lt. Kraskow; Wayne Alexander as Agent Arnold; David Michael Mullins as Tour Guide

Episode chronology
| ← Previous "Agua Mala" | Next → "Arcadia" |
- The X-Files season 6

"Monday" is the fourteenth episode of the sixth season of the science fiction television series The X-Files. It premiered on the Fox network on February 28, 1999. It was written by Vince Gilligan and John Shiban, directed by Kim Manners, and featured guest appearances by Carrie Hamilton and Darren E. Burrows. The episode is a "Monster-of-the-Week" story, unconnected to the series' wider mythology. "Monday" earned a Nielsen household rating of 10.2, being watched by 16.7 million people in its initial broadcast. The episode received positive reviews from television critics.

The show centers on FBI special agents Fox Mulder (David Duchovny) and Dana Scully (Gillian Anderson) who work on cases linked to the paranormal, called X-Files. Mulder is a believer in the paranormal, while the skeptical Scully has been assigned to debunk his work. In this episode, the world is trapped in a time loop, and only one woman, named Pam (Carrie Hamilton), seems to know. Each day the events that happen differ slightly. A bank robbery is committed over and over again until finally the eventual bombing of the building is prevented. Somehow, Mulder and Scully are trapped in the middle of it all.

"Monday" was inspired by an episode of The Twilight Zone entitled "Shadow Play" (1961). Since the cast and crew were required to shoot the same scene several times, director Kim Manners attempted to make each camera angle interesting. Actress Carrie Hamilton was cast to play Pam, and Darren E. Burrows, a former regular on Northern Exposure, was cast to play her boyfriend Bernard.

== Plot ==
The episode opens in media res with FBI agent Fox Mulder (David Duchovny) bleeding from a gunshot wound during a bank robbery as Dana Scully (Gillian Anderson) tends to him. When she attempts to reason with the gunman, Bernard (Darren E. Burrows), he reveals a bomb strapped to his chest. As police storm the bank, Bernard detonates the bomb and kills everyone inside.

Mulder then awakens unharmed at the beginning of the same day. Needing to pay his landlord for the water damage, he goes to the bank rather than a meeting with Scully and Walter Skinner (Mitch Pileggi). Bernard arrives and attempts to rob the bank, shooting Mulder in the process. The teller activates the silent alarm, bringing Scully and the police to the scene. As before, the police storm the bank and Bernard detonates the bomb. But once again, the day begins again, with everyone oblivious to the time loop except Bernard's girlfriend, Pam (Carrie Hamilton). Having apparently experienced the day more than fifty times, Pam has repeatedly tried to prevent the disaster by warning Mulder and Scully and begging Skinner not to let the police storm the bank. Although details change during each iteration, the result remains the same: Bernard detonates the bomb (usually after shooting Mulder) and everyone inside dies.

Gradually, Mulder begins to recall fragments from previous loops. Pam finally convinces him that the day is repeating. In the next loop, Mulder, acting on a hunch, calls Scully and confronts Bernard before the robbery begins. Scully brings Pam into the bank, and she and Mulder convince Bernard to surrender. Suddenly, approaching police sirens agitate Bernard, and he attempts to shoot Mulder. Pam, however, steps in front of the bullet and is mortally wounded. As she lies dying, she tells Mulder, "This never happened before."

== Production ==
=== Writing, casting, and filming ===
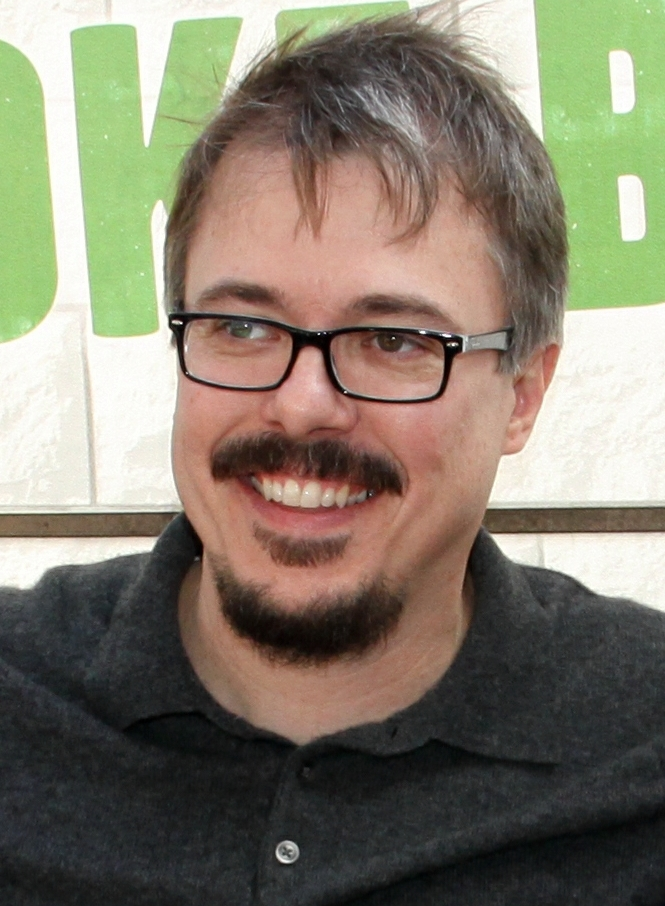
Episode co-writer Vince Gilligan was inspired by an episode of The Twilight Zone called "Shadow Play" (1961).

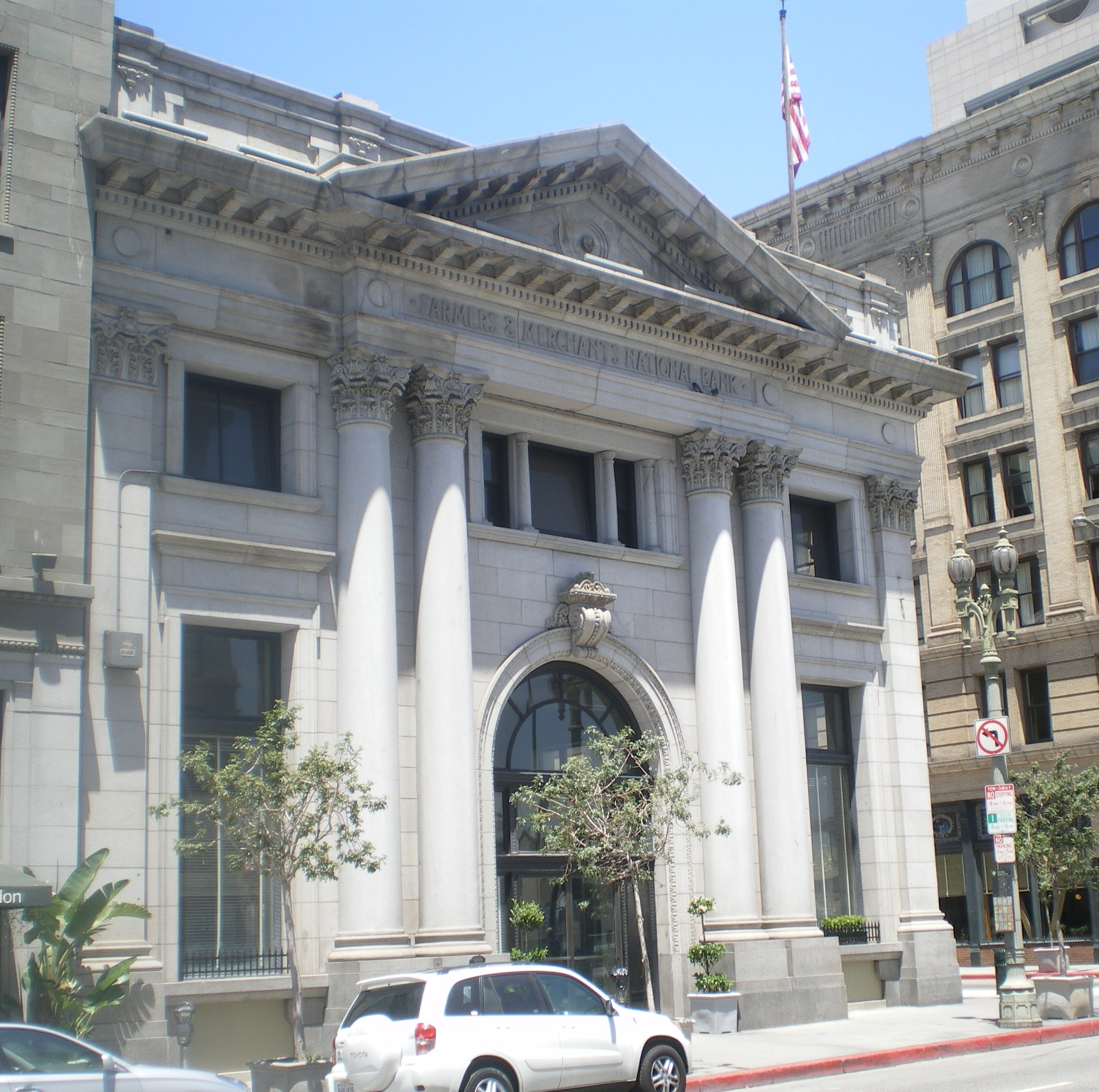
Farmers and Merchants Bank used in filming.

This episode, which was written under "extreme pressure" during the show's brief Christmas hiatus, has been stylistically compared to the comedy film Groundhog Day (1993). Vince Gilligan and John Shiban, the writers of the episode, however, credit an episode of The Twilight Zone entitled "Shadow Play" (1961). Gilligan later noted: "The funny thing about 'Monday' is people seemed to really like it a lot, but people always sort of smiled and said you're sort of ripping off Groundhog Day aren't you? [...] And I'd say, we're not ripping off Groundhog Day, we're ripping off The Twilight Zone."

Casting director Rick Millikan was tasked with finding an actress to play Pam, the would-be bank robber's girlfriend. Millikan expressed the difficulty in casting the role:"You had to feel sorry for this woman's terrible, unbelievable plight—basically she's trapped in a living hell—without at any time thinking she's insane." The role eventually went to actress Carrie Hamilton. This was one of Hamilton's final television roles, as she died from cancer three years later at the age of 38. For the role of Bernard, Millikan cast Darren Burrows, a former regular on the CBS comedy series Northern Exposure.

Director Kim Manners, realizing the monotony of some of the scenes, such as Mulder waking up after each successive explosion, attempted to make each shot interesting by incorporating new camera angle so that the final episode would be visually appealing and hold the viewers' attention. First assistant director Bruce Carter examined the script and created a complex timeline to make shooting easier. This process alone took up two weeks, but Carter considered it a success: "It was one of the things I was proudest of all year."

The bank scenes were filmed at (34°02′53.3″N 118°14′51.1″W) 401 South Main Street at the corner of Fourth Street in downtown Los Angeles that had previously been a branch of Farmers and Merchants Bank of Los Angeles. The building was completely renovated, and all of the items that were featured in the episode were bought from a bank-supply catalogue by set decorator Tim Stepeck. During the hold-up scenes taking place outside the bank, a four-block area was blocked off by police to allow film crews ample space to work. Manners used eleven cameras during this portion of filming, and some accidentally made it onto the film; these were later erased during post-production. While filming, the police cruisers parked outside the bank were all turned off, as the combined noise of the cars would drown out dialogue. To ensure that their lights would still flash, car coordinator Danny Briggs installed portable battery chargers in each car.

=== Props and make-up ===
This episode made use of a number of props, with the waterbed (which was purchased by Morris Fletcher earlier in the sixth season episode "Dreamland" while in Mulder's body) proving to be the hardest prop to locate. Stepeck had to order the bed from a specialized furniture store in San Francisco. Mulder's paycheck and envelope were created after several calls to the J. Edgar Hoover Building in Washington, D.C. The checks were made to be as realistic as possible without looking too convincing. When it came time to apply Hamilton's makeup, lead makeup designer Cheri Montesanto-Mecalf applied mascara under the actress's eyes and then smudged it to give her a "haunted" look. Pam's "stringy [and] multi-hued hairstyle" was Hamilton's creation. Dena Green, the hair department head, was tasked with creating an exact wig replica to be worn by Hamilton's stunt double.

== Broadcast and reception ==
=== Ratings ===
"Monday" first aired in the United States on February 28, 1999. This episode earned a Nielsen rating of 10.2, meaning that roughly 10.2 percent of all television-equipped households were tuned in to the episode. It was viewed by 16.7 million viewers. The episode aired in the United Kingdom and Ireland on Sky1 on June 13, 1999, and received 0.90 million viewers, making it the second most-watched episode that week, behind Friends.

=== Reviews ===
The episode received consistently positive reviews. Tom Kessenich, in his book Examination: An Unauthorized Look at Seasons 6–9 of the X-Files gave the episode a positive review, writing "One of the strengths of 'Monday' is in showing us Scully's evolution and how her experiences with Mulder allow her to embrace, albeit reluctantly, ideas that are not grounded in science." Den of Geek writer Juliette Harrisson named the episode the "finest stand-alone episode" of the sixth season and wrote, "Time loops, if dragged on for too long, can become tedious, but in small doses they can be hilariously funny or achingly poignant. This episode is definitely the latter, as the downtrodden girlfriend of a bank robber is forced to witness the deaths of her boyfriend, Mulder, Scully and a large group of innocent people die over and over again until finally she breaks the loop by dying herself [...] The onus of saving everyone being largely on the shoulders of an unknown woman effectively brings in a change of pace and a welcome breath of fresh air." Earl Cressey from DVD Talk called "Monday" one of the "highlights of season six." Zack Handlen of The A.V. Club awarded the episode an "A" and called it "a script which balances humor, structural brilliance, and compassion in equal measure." Handlen compared and contrasted the episode to Groundhog Day, noting that, while both feature a character who is able to restart a day, in "Monday", the characters have the benefit of free will and can change factors: "Every Monday to her has certain basic requirements: boyfriend with bomb, bank robbery, the FBI agents […] and the earth-shattering Kaboom. Aside from that, nothing is certain." Handlen concluded that the episode managed to be both "a very funny hour", as well as possess serious "sadness".

Jordan Farley from SFX magazine named the episode the eighth of the "Top Groundhog Days" episodes. Farley applauded the show's gall to seemingly kill one of the leads in the teaser and appreciated the entry's mix of humor—during the scenes with Mulder and his water bed—and its alternative scenarios in the bank. Natalie Prado from Just Press Play gave the episode an A− and wrote, "The episode is well-written and tense. As an audience, we become increasingly frustrated that the two people that we know can solve the problem are unaware that it exists, which makes the payoff when they finally find a way out much more satisfying. There are a few leaps in logic, especially towards the end, but overall it's solid and enjoyable." Jamie Jeffords, writing for the Dallas Morning News, awarded the episode four out of five stars and praised Hamilton's performance, saying, "What makes 'Monday' is the performance of Hamilton [...] When she is killed in the end, she almost possesses a quiet glee when she realizes her death never happened before, so maybe it is over now. Her performance is haunting. Very powerful." Michigan Daily writer Melissa Runstrom, in a review of the sixth season, said "Monday" was "well made and entertaining." Paula Vitaris from Cinefantastique gave the episode a largely positive review and awarded it three-and-a-half stars out of four. Vitaris called the episode "ingenious and heart-wrenching," and noted that David Duchovny and Gillian Anderson's acting was the best of the season. Furthermore, she praised Kim Manners' directing style, calling the same scenes shot in different ways "new". UGO Networks listed the episode as number 95 in a countdown of the "100 Greatest Moments in Time Travel".

=== References in other media ===
In the episode "Life Serial", the fifth episode of the sixth season of Buffy the Vampire Slayer, Warren Mears (Adam Busch) makes a reference to the episode, referring to the entry as the one "where the bank kept exploding".

== Bibliography ==
- Kessenich, Tom (2002). Examination: An Unauthorized Look at Seasons 6–9 of the X-Files. Trafford Publishing. ISBN 1-55369-812-6.
- Meisler, Andy (2000). The End and the Beginning: The Official Guide to the X-Files Season 6. HarperCollins. ISBN 0-06-107595-7.
- Miles, Lawrence; Lars Pearson; Christia Dickson (2003). Dusted. Mad Norwegian Press. ISBN 0-9725959-0-2.
