= Diamond Yukai =

Japanese rock singer and actor

- ダイアモンド✡ユカイ
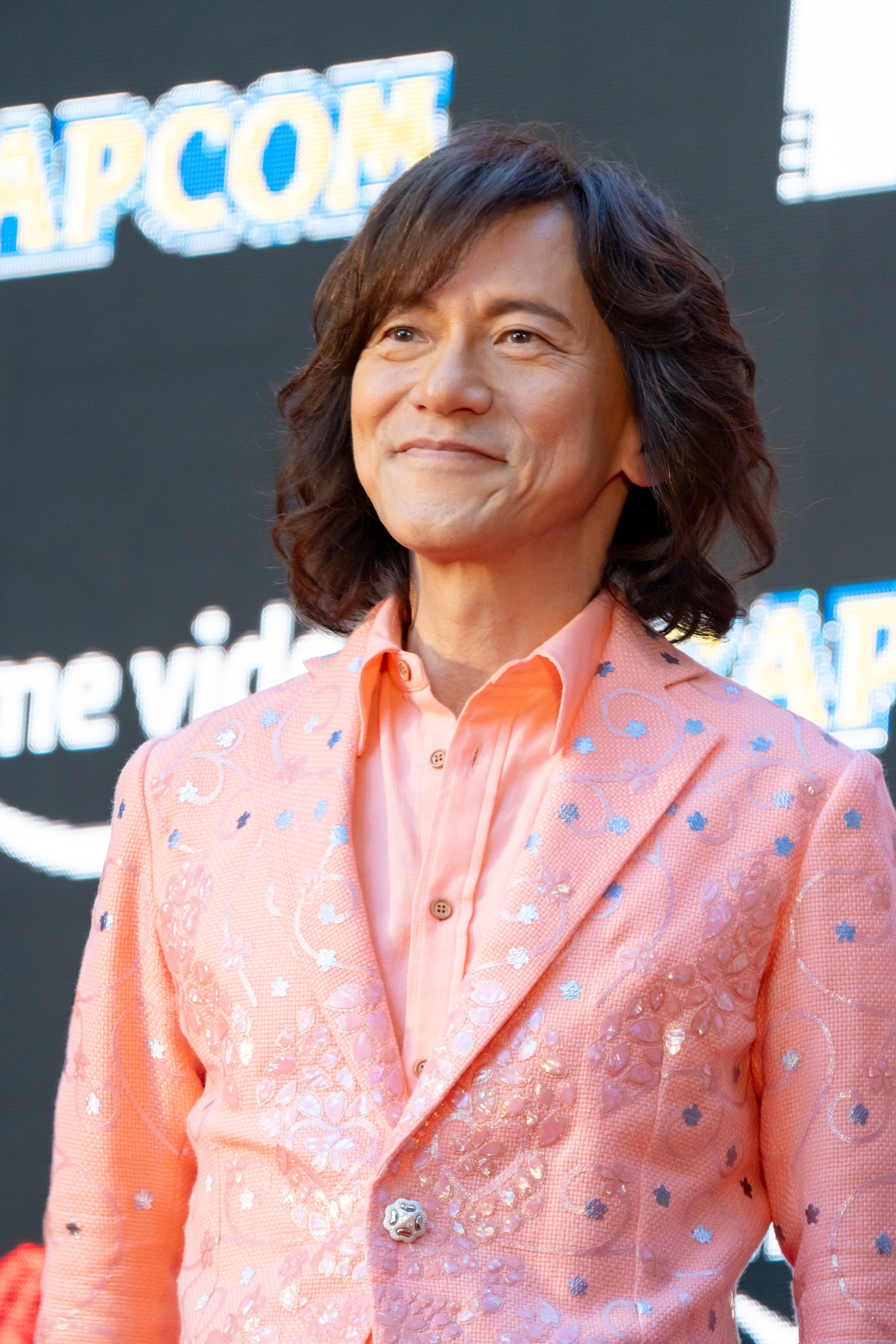
- Born: Yutaka Tadokoro; March 12, 1962 (age 64); Tanashi, Tokyo, Japan
- Occupations: Singer, actor
- Years active: 1985–present
- Spouse: Rieko Miura (m. 1997; div. 2001)
- Website: ameblo.jp/diamondyukai

Yutaka Tadokoro (田所 豊, Tadokoro Yutaka; born March 12, 1962), known professionally as Diamond Yukai (ダイアモンド✡ユカイ, Daiamondo Yukai), is a Japanese rock singer and actor. He was born in Tanashi, Tokyo, Japan. He is the vocalist for the Japanese rock band Red Warriors. He has acted in the Hollywood films Tokyo Pop and Lost in Translation and is often seen on television variety shows.

== Movies ==
He appeared in the following movies:

- Tokyo Pop (1988) in role of Hiro as partner of Carrie Hamilton (Wendy)
- Toy Story (1995) singing the Japanese version of "You've Got a Friend in Me", "Strange Things" and "I Will Go Sailing No More"
- Non-Stop/Dangan Runner (1996)
- Unlucky Monkey (1998)
- Lost in Translation (2003)
- Kamen Rider × Super Sentai: Ultra Super Hero Taisen (2017), Shocker Leader III

== Theatre ==
- Miss Saigon (2016), The Engineer
