= Tokyo Pop =

1988 film by Fran Rubel Kuzui

- Theatrical release poster
- Directed by: Fran Rubel Kuzui
- Screenplay by: Fran Rubel Kuzui; Lynn Grossman
- Produced by: Kaz Kuzui; Joel Tuber
- Starring: Carrie Hamilton; Yutaka Tadokoro
- Cinematography: James Hayman
- Edited by: Camilla Toniolo
- Music by: Alan Brewer
- Production companies: Kuzui Enterprises; Lorimar
- Distributed by: Spectrafilm (United States); Shochiku-Fuji Company (Japan)
- Release dates: April 15, 1988 (United States); November 5, 1988 (Japan)
- Running time: 99 minutes
- Countries: United States; Japan
- Languages: English; Japanese
- Box office: $37,834

Tokyo Pop (Japanese: トーキョー ポップ, Hepburn: Tōkyō Poppu) is a 1988 musical romantic comedy film directed by Fran Rubel Kuzui, who co-wrote the screenplay with Lynn Grossman. The film follows a young American singer (Carrie Hamilton) who travels to Tokyo and meets a local rock musician (Yutaka Tadokoro), with whom she develops a romantic and musical connection. It contrasts American customs with Tokyo lifestyles, while presenting an evolving love story between the two main characters.

In real life, Tadokoro fronted the 1980s rock group Red Warriors, who also star in the film as themselves. Other notable actors include Michael Cerveris, Gina Belafonte, and Tetsurō Tamba, with an uncredited cameo by Japanese rock band X Japan.

== Plot ==
Wendy Reed is a young aspiring singer in New York City who sings backup in her boyfriend Mike's band. After a gig, Wendy is furious to learn that Mike is planning to replace her with another female singer. The next day, she receives a postcard from a friend who lives in Tokyo. Disillusioned with the local music scene and having heard of American musicians achieving success in Japan, Wendy steals Mike's rent money and impulsively flies to Tokyo to visit her friend. However, shortly after arriving, Wendy discovers that her friend has moved to Thailand, forcing her to move into a low-rent hostel for gaijin (foreigners) in Itabashi and take a job as a hostess at a karaoke bar.

One night, after missing the last train to Itabashi and failing to get a taxi, Wendy meets a charismatic young man named Hiro Yamaguchi, the leader of a struggling rock band. When a disheartened Wendy vents about needing money for a hotel room, Hiro misinterprets the situation and takes her to a love hotel, angering her. She sleeps in the bathtub and leaves the next morning. Some time later, Wendy and Hiro run into each other again in Yoyogi Park; this time, they hit it off and soon begin a relationship. As they become acquainted with each other, Hiro confesses to Wendy that he has written a few original songs in Japanese, despite his fascination with Western popular culture and the fact that his band only performs covers of classic American songs.

At the behest of his bandmates, who insist they need a gaijin singer, Hiro invites Wendy to join his band. Although Wendy is determined to succeed on her own, she ultimately agrees to join Hiro's band. The band desperately attempts to catch the attention of Dota, a hotshot record producer, hoping for a chance to perform at an upcoming music festival. After Wendy barges into Dota's office and gives him a demo tape, the band lands an opening gig for a women's wrestling match. Hiro is dismayed by the gig, while Wendy sees it as an opportunity to gain national television exposure. The two argue in front of photographers, and their photo appears in a tabloid, propelling the band to national stardom—mostly due to Wendy's appeal as a blonde American woman.

As the band achieves commercial success with a cover version of the Lovin' Spoonful's "Do You Believe in Magic", Wendy and Hiro move into a lavish apartment together. At a nightclub, a modeling agent cautions Wendy that being a gaijin singer in Japan is a passing fad, and questions the longevity of her career due to ever-changing trends in Japan. Wendy, tired of her status as a gaijin, tells Hiro that she wants to quit the band and return home, and encourages him to perform his original material at the music festival. She agrees to watch the band's performance at the festival, and is moved to tears as Hiro sings one of his original songs as frontman.

Wendy bids Hiro goodbye and flies back to the United States, where she records an original song dedicated to Hiro.

== Cast ==
- Carrie Hamilton as Wendy Reed
- Yutaka Tadokoro as Hiro Yamaguchi
- Taiji Tonoyama as Grandfather
- Tetsurō Tamba as Dota
- Masumi Harukawa as Mother
- Hiroshi Mikami as Seki
- Mike Cerveris as Mike
- Gina Belafonte as Holly
- Rikiya Yasuoka as Akira

== Soundtrack ==
The soundtrack was released by RIC Records in 1988 on CD, cassette, and vinyl LP. It features all the original songs written for the film and performed by Hamilton and Tadokoro, as well as other artists featured in the film.

== Release ==
Tokyo Pop was released in New York City on April 15, 1988, by Spectrafilm and in Japan on November 5, 1988, by Shochiku-Fuji Company.

In honor of its 35th anniversary, Tokyo Pop was restored in 4K by IndieCollect in association with the Academy Film Archive, with funding from Carrie Hamilton's mother Carol Burnett, Dolly Parton, the HFPA Trust, and donors to IndieCollect's Jane Fonda Fund for Women Directors. The restoration was released by Kino Lorber in New York City at BAM Rose Cinemas on August 4, 2023, and in Los Angeles at the American Cinematheque on August 11, followed by a national expansion. It was then released on Blu-ray on December 5, 2023.

== Reception ==
On the review aggregator website Rotten Tomatoes, 100% of 10 critics' reviews are positive, with an average rating of 8.2/10. Metacritic, which uses a weighted average, assigned the film a score of 60 out of 100, based on 7 critics, indicating "mixed or average" reviews.

Andy Crump of Paste gave the film an 8.1 out of 10, commenting that "[t]he combination of free-spiritedness, musical fellowship, bemused culture comedy, and kindred hearts is seamless, paced with the sense that Kuzui has somewhere to be and a clear path to get there; Tokyo Pop moves briskly, a quality enhanced by the liveliness baked into Hamilton and Tadokoro's chemistry." Walter Goodman of The New York Times stated, "You don't have to be a fan of rock music to get a kick out of Tokyo Pop, a wedding of American and Japanese youth cultures as seen through a fun-house mirror." Sheila Benson of Los Angeles Times called the film "a shrewd, amiable cross-cultural romance full of talent at every level."
