= Rome Kanda =

Japanese talent, comedian and actor

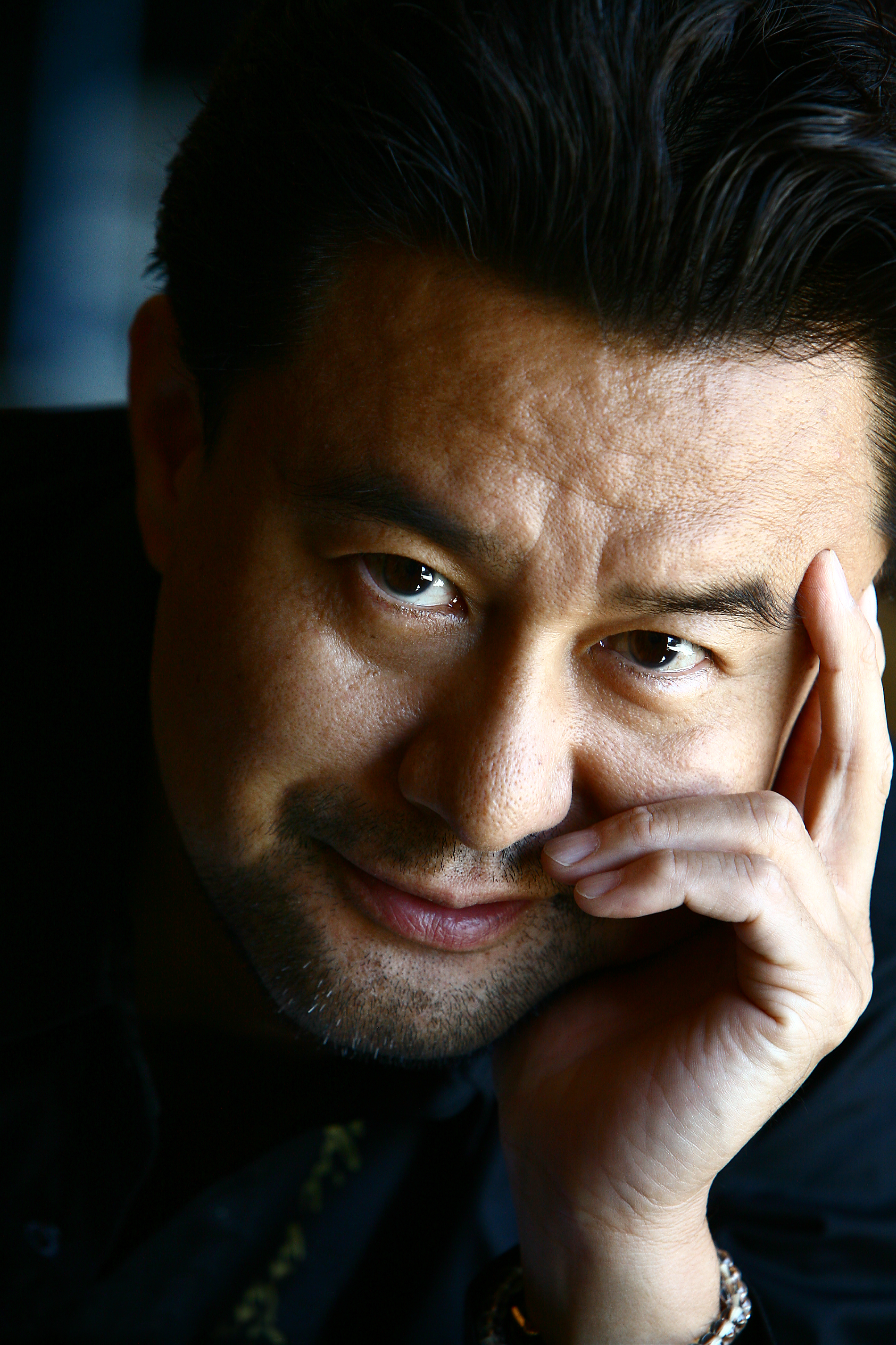
- Born: Kishiwada, Osaka, Japan
- Occupations: Talent, comedian, actor
- Years active: 1987- present

Rome Kanda (神田 瀧夢, Kanda Romu) is a Japanese television personality (tarento), comedian, and actor based in the United States. Kanda currently lives and works in Los Angeles, California.

Born in Kishiwada, Kanda spent his early career as an actor with his debut movie, Tokyo Pop directed by Fran Rubel Kuzui and filmed in Japan and the USA in 1987. After deciding to be an actor and comedian, he moved to the USA in 1999 and made his first appearances on Ned's Declassified School Survival Guide as a samurai. Kanda is also known for his hosting role on the "Majide" game on I Survived a Japanese Game Show in 2008 and 2009 and played host Kei Kato on the G4 broadcasts of Kinniku Banzuke.

He has also appeared on Late Night with Conan O'Brien, Saturday Night Live, and in a commercial for the New York Mets as a sushi chef. Kanda has also starred in films such as Takeshi Kitano's film Sonatine. His most recent film appearance has been a supportive role (President of the Japanese corporation) in The Informant! (2009), a Matt Damon film directed by Steven Soderbergh.

Kanda recently appeared as a spokesman and personality for Sun Drop. He appears in several TV commercials playing a soda sommelier named "The Taste Master".

Kanda is familiar with a variety of Japanese traditional performing arts and martial arts such as Buyō, Karate, Kendo, Iaido, among which is samurai sword fighting, which he teaches, while he continues to perform at a comedy club in Hollywood as a comedian.

Kanda was chosen to be one of the speakers at "TEDxTOKYO 2010 HIT RESET" held in Tokyo on May 15, 2010.

== Selected filmography ==
- Pachinko (2022): Doctor (one episode)
- Cobra Kai (2021): Mako (one episode)
- Maniac (2018): Dr. Robert Muramoto (four episodes)

== Video game appearances ==
- 2020 : Cyberpunk 2077 : Goro Takemura
