= David Nunan =

Australian linguist (born 1949)

David Nunan (born 11 October 1949 in Broken Hill, Australia) is an Australian linguist who has focused on the teaching of English. He is the author of the English as a Foreign or Second Language textbook series "Go For It!".

Nunan's academic and student textbooks are published by Cambridge University Press, Oxford University Press, Anaheim University Press, Palgrave/Macmillan, and the EFL publishing division of Cengage Learning. Nunan is Vice-President for Academic Affairs at Anaheim University based in Anaheim, California. Nunan serves in a concurrent role as Dean of the Graduate School of Education and Professor of Teaching English to Speakers of Other Languages (TESOL) at Anaheim University where he has worked since 1996.

In 2000, Nunan served as President of TESOL Inc., the world's largest language teaching association, and was the second person to serve as President from outside North America. Previously Nunan has served as Chair and Professor of Applied Linguistics at the University of Hong Kong and has been involved in the teaching of graduate programs for such institutions as the University of Hawaiʻi, Monterey Institute for International Studies, Sophia University, Chulalongkorn University, Thailand and many others. He is Academic Advisor to the GlobalEnglish Corporation, and is on the Executive Committee of The International Research Foundation for English Language Education.

Nunan began his career in Teaching English as a Second Language (ESL) in Sydney, Australia before completing graduate studies in the United Kingdom. He has worked as a teacher, researcher and consultant in many countries including Australia, the United Kingdom, the United States, Thailand, Singapore, Japan, China—Hong Kong and in a number of Latin American countries.

== Awards ==
In 2002 Nunan received a congressional citation from the United States House of Representatives for his services to English language education through his pioneering work in online education through Anaheim University. In 2003 he was ranked the 7th most influential Australian in Asia by Business Review Weekly, and in 2005 he was named one of the top "50 Australians who Matter". In November 2006 Nunan was awarded the Convocation medal for outstanding achievement and contribution internationally to the profession of Teaching English as a second language, from Flinders University, where he earned his PhD in Education and Linguistics. In December 2006 Nunan was invited by the Australian Prime Minister to attend the Advance Leading 100 Global Australians Summit in Sydney, Australia.

== Selected publications ==
Nunan, D. (1991). Language Teaching Methodology: A Textbook for Teachers (Prentice Hall International English Language Teaching). Prentice Hall.

Nunan, D. (1998). Second Language Teaching & Learning (1st ed.). Heinle ELT.

Nunan, D., David Nunan, Candlin, C. N., & Widdowson, H. G. (1988). Syllabus Design. Oxford University Press.

Nunan, D. (2003). Practical English Language Teaching PELT Text (A Course in English Language Teaching) (1st edition). McGraw-Hill Education.

Nunan, D. (2004). Task-Based Language Teaching (Cambridge Language Teaching Library) (1st ed.). Cambridge University Press.

Nunan, David; Choi, Julie (2023). Clarity and coherence in academic writing : using language as a resource. New York, New York. ISBN 978-1-003-17909-2. OCLC 1366058114.
