= Production management =

Production management or production manager may refer to:

- Manufacturing process management, technologies and methods used to define how products are to be manufactured
- Production management (performing arts), responsible for overseeing and coordinating the production of live events
- Project production management, application of operations management to the delivery of capital projects
- Unit production manager, in a film production office

== See also ==
- International Journal of Operations & Production Management
- Manufacturing operations management
- Production and Operations Management
- Operations management
- Production control
- Production engineering
- Production planning
- Production support
- Supply chain management
