= Kayabukiya Tavern =

Coordinates: 36°34′42″N 139°55′38″E

- Interactive map of Kayabukiya Tavern

Restaurant information
- Owner: Kaoru Otsuka
- Food type: Japanese
- Location: Utsunomiya, Japan
- Other information: Closed on 2020

The Kayabukiya Tavern (居酒屋 かやぶき, izakaya kayabuki) was a traditional-style Japanese "sake-house" restaurant (izakaya) that was located in the city of Utsunomiya, north of Tokyo, Japan.

The tavern's owner, Kaoru Otsuka, owns two pet macaque monkeys who were employed to work at the location. The first monkey, twelve-year-old "Yat-chan", is dressed in a shirt and shorts while he takes customers' drink orders and delivers them to the diners' tables. The younger macaque, named Fuku-chan, is currently four years old and has the main duty of bringing the attendees hot towels to clean their hands before ordering drinks. Fuku-chan had only two years of experience, while Yat-chan has been reportedly performing the job for a longer time.

Both monkeys received boiled soya beans from customers as tips for their service. The monkeys' environment has been inspected to ensure proper treatment of the animals; due to Japanese animal rights regulations, they are each only allowed to work for two hours a day. The restaurant was also featured as a reward for the winning team in the third episode of Season Two of I Survived a Japanese Game Show.

The tavern was closed on October 15, 2020. As of 2025, the whereabouts of the monkeys is unknown.
