= Tony Sano =

American actor

Tony Sano is a Japanese-American musician, voiceover artist, and actor.

Born in Tokyo, Sano is best known as the host of the first season of ABC's I Survived a Japanese Game Show. On the experience, Sano commented, "It was great to see people from different cultures coming together."

He also hosted MTV's Spring Break in Japan and was a recurring guest star in Kamen Rider: Dragon Knight. Sano has played lead and supporting roles in several independent films, including Touch Wood. He was born in Japan and was brought to America at the age of three. He learned to speak his native language and has made regular visits to his homeland to see family and friends.

Sano has been working in Hollywood since 2006, pursuing his acting career. During his free time, he enjoys singing and songwriting on the piano. He enjoys poker and has competed professionally. He lives in Los Angeles.
