= I Survived a Japanese Game Show =

- Genre: Reality Television; Game Show
- Created by: David Sidebotham; Karsten Bartholin (also executive producers)
- Directed by: Kent Weed
- Starring: Tony Sano (TV host, Season 1); Rome Kanda (Majide host)
- Narrated by: Robert Cait
- Country of origin: United States
- Original languages: English; Japanese
- No. of seasons: 2
- No. of episodes: 15

Production
- Executive producers: Arthur Smith; Kent Weed; Tim Cresenti, David Sidebotham, Karsten Bartholin
- Production locations: Toho Studios, Tokyo, Japan
- Running time: 60 minutes 120 minutes (season finale)
- Production companies: A Smith & Co. Productions; Babyfoot Productions

Original release
- Network: ABC
- Release: June 24, 2008 – August 5, 2009

I Survived a Japanese Game Show is an American reality show that saw its first-season premiere on ABC on June 24, 2008. The show follows a group of Americans, who leave the United States for Japan where they compete in a Japanese-style game show. The winner takes home US$250,000 (JP ¥25 million). The series won both the Best Reality prize and the overall prize at the 2009 Rose d'Or ceremony.

On October 9, 2008, it was renewed for a second season. On March 5, 2010, it was announced that ABC had not renewed the show for a third season.

== Format ==
Season 1 logo

In Season One, the contestants are informed that they are to take part in a reality-style competition, but not informed of the nature of the show. They are flown to Tokyo, Japan, and taken to the Toho Studios, where it is revealed that they are to compete in a Japanese game show called Majide (本気で). For Season Two, Majide host Rome Kanda surprised each of the contestants in their hometowns informing them they were going to Japan.

Teams were assigned into one of two teams and competed in Challenges against each other; the winning team was given a reward activity while the losing team was given a punishment activity after their team game. The losing team in each team challenge had to nominate two members to compete in an elimination challenge head-to-head (if the team could not reach a decision, the winning team decided the members instead; however, if the team had only two members remaining, they will be competing by default). The two members compete and the losing contestant is eliminated from the show, which is carried offstage and sent back to the United States by the "sayonara mob" (脱落者决定), dressed in black suits.

In the second season, episodes before the finale had three games each. The winner of the first game would be awarded an advantage for the second challenge, and two members of the team that lost the second game would compete in an elimination challenge.

In the final phase of the competition, teams are dissolved and the remaining contestants compete in challenges as individuals, with the last-placed contestant facing elimination. The final two competed in one final challenge, dubbed Super Majide!, which comprises various elements combined from past challenges for the season, and the winner of the final challenge is named the season's winner and wins $250,000 (¥25 million) cash prize. The winner is also greeted by the same "sayonara mob" dressed in white suits, known as the "omedeto mob" ("congratulations mob") (優勝者決定).

The series followed not only the Majide competition but also the contestants' activities backstage and outside the game show in reality style. The contestants lived in a house together in the suburb of Kasai, with a Mama-san (Kozue Saito), who generally expects the contestants to live in line with Japanese culture and customs. In season 2, they live in the Majide Guest House with Mama-san.

The host of season one was Japanese-American Tony Sano, who commented, "It's going to be like nothing American audiences have seen on network television." Episodes are narrated by Robert Cait.

The show was produced by A. Smith & Co. Productions (the producers of Gordon Ramsay's Hell's Kitchen and Kitchen Nightmares in the USA) with Arthur Smith, Kent Weed of A. Smith and Co. and Tim Cresenti of Small World International Format Television as executive producers and Weed directing, and is distributed by Disney/ABC's Greengrass Productions division. The format was created by Danish producers Karsten Bartholin and David Sidebotham for Babyfoot ApS and was originally titled Big in Japan.

=== Majide ===
Majide logo

Majide (which is Japanese slang for "Seriously?!"), the show-within-the-show was not an actual Japanese game show but was intended to resemble a Japanese game show. The American producers watched hours of Japanese game shows, took the most common elements and created all of the games, with help from producers in Japan, who also produced the game segments at Toho Studios. In contrast to many American game shows, which are usually based on either trivia (such as Who Wants to Be a Millionaire? or Jeopardy!), mental skill (Wheel of Fortune), celebrity interaction (Match Game or The $100,000 Pyramid), or luck (Let's Make a Deal), Japanese game shows such as Takeshi's Castle and Sasuke tend to be more physically oriented; I Survived a Japanese Game Show uses the Japanese show Majide as its source for challenges, while the reality show format used a strategy base for whom to eliminate and whom to keep, in the tradition of Big Brother and Survivor.

Majide is hosted by Rome Kanda and judged by Masahiro Hurugori, known on the show as Judge Bobu (Bob). Kanda has translated "Majide" (マジで) as "You've got to be crazy!", or simply as "seriously!?".

== Season overview ==
=== Season 1 ===
The first episode premiered on ABC on June 24, 2008, ran for seven episodes and ended on August 6, 2008. Ten contestants competed in two challenges each week (one team game and one elimination game).

Justin Wood was named the winner and Donnell Pitman was the season's runner-up.

=== Season 2 ===
The second season premiered on June 17, 2009, ran for eight episodes and ended on August 5, 2009. 12 contestants competed in three challenges weekly (one advantage, one team game and one elimination game). The final episode had six games (two team games and four elimination challenges). Sano did not return from hosting, and Kanda assumed the roles for both.

Cathy Grosam was named the winner and Linda Plaxen was the season's runner-up.

== International syndication ==
Besides the US, sixteen other countries bought the format. The American version of this show aired in Australia on 7Two, Denmark on TV3, Hungary on Animax, New Zealand's TV2, Poland's AXN, Singapore's Channel 5, the Philippines' Studio 23, Sweden's TV6, Slovenia's TV3 Slovenia and Portugal's SIC Radical. The Greek version of the show (under the original name Big In Japan) airs on Alpha TV. In Malaysia, it airs on 8tv, in South Africa on Animax.

== International versions ==
Country	Local title	Network(s)	Year aired	Host(s)
Brazil	Made in Japão	RecordTV	March 8, 2020 – June 27, 2020	Sabrina Sato
Greece	Big in Japan	Alpha TV	February 1, 2009	Kalomoira with Yoshi Amao
Japan	ジャパニーズゲームショー「マジで!?」	Dlife	March 2012	Tony Sano with Rome Kanda
Norway	Hjelp, jeg er med i et japansk gameshow!	TV3	February 8, 2009 – April 5, 2009	Sigrid Louise Gundersen
Portugal	Portugal de Olhos em Bico	TVI	November 2009 – 2010	José Pedro Vasconcelos
Sweden	Hjälp! Jag är med i en japansk TV-show	TV4	2009	Carolina Gynning

=== Greece ===
A Greek version was produced by Alpha TV and began airing on February 1, 2009 with the title Big in Japan. The host was Kalomoira, a Greek singer, with Yoshi Amao. 12 contestants took part.

=== Sweden ===
In 2009, Sweden began airing its own version of the show called Hjälp! Jag är med i en japansk TV-show (Help! I'm in a Japanese television show) with Swedish celebrities competing against each other. The show was produced and aired by TV4. The Swedish version was also recorded in the Toho Studios but did not include Tony Sano, Masahiro Hurugori or Rome Kanda. Instead it was narrated (and sometimes hosted) by Carolina Gynning. The show-within-the-show was not Majide but Do Konjo, and was hosted by Yoshi Amao with Mr. Fu as the judge.

==== Contestants ====
- Kjell Eriksson (radio host) - winner of Hjälp! Jag är med i en japansk TV-show
- Klasse Möllberg (musician, actor) - runner-up
- Regina Lund (actress, singer) - third place
- Sandra Dahlberg (artist) - 5th eliminated after episode 8
- Johannes Brost (actor) - 4th eliminated after episode 7
- Dogge Doggelito (artist) - Left the show after episode 6
- Anna Book (singer) - 3rd eliminated after episode 6
- Marie Picasso (singer, model) - 2nd eliminated after episode 4
- Tore Kullgren (TV-profile) - 1st eliminated after episode 1

The winner of the final episode of Hjälp! Jag är med i en japansk TV-show was Kjell Eriksson, against runner-up Klasse Möllberg.

=== Norway ===
A Norwegian version of the Swedish format was aired by the TV3 network.

=== Portugal ===
In late November 2009, Portuguese TV station TVI aired its own version of the series called Portugal de Olhos em Bico. It ran only for two episodes. Instead of traveling to Japan, the contestants played the game in a TV studio in Portugal. They were divided into three teams of two members each, each of whom were relatives or friends. The teams were different in each episode, with the team with the most points winning at the end of each episode.
