= The Spook Who Sat by the Door =

The Spook Who Sat by the Door may refer to:

- The Spook Who Sat by the Door (novel), a 1969 novel by Sam Greenlee
- The Spook Who Sat by the Door (film), a 1973 film based on the novel
- The Spook Who Sat by the Door (TV series), a FX series based on the novel
