= Lawrence Cook (actor) =

American actor (1930–2003)

- Born: May 7, 1930; New York City, New York, U.S.
- Died: December 27, 2003 (aged 73); Marina del Rey, California, U.S.
- Occupation: Actor
- Years active: 1970–1993

Lawrence Cook (May 7, 1930 – December 27, 2003) was an American actor.

Cook starred in The Spook Who Sat by the Door (1973). In that film, which was based on the 1969 novel of the same name by Sam Greenlee, Cook portrayed Dan Freeman, a secret black nationalist who is trained by the CIA and later trains and leads black freedom fighters in an uprising against the U.S. government.

Before The Spook Who Sat by the Door, Cook appeared in films such as Cotton Comes to Harlem (1970) and Trouble Man (1972). After Spook, he appeared in Colors (1988) and Posse (1993), as well as in television series including Family Matters, The Mod Squad, Columbo and McMillan & Wife. He also appeared as Paul Grant on the daytime soap opera Days Of Our Lives from 1975 to 1976.

Cook died in 2003 in Marina del Rey, California. He was buried in Westwood Village Memorial Park Cemetery.

== Filmography ==
Year	Title	Role	Notes
1970	The Landlord	Larry	
1970	Cotton Comes to Harlem	1st Young Black Man	
1972	The Man	Congressman Steller	
1972	Trouble Man	Buddy	
1973	The Spook Who Sat by the Door	Dan Freeman	
1975	Lord Shango	Jabo	
1988	Colors	Officer Young	
1992	Interceptor	Major Haroldson	
1992	Posse	Cook	
1993	No More Dirty Deals	Carlton	(final film role)
