= East Ypsilanti, Michigan =

Village

East Ypsilanti, Michigan was a village along the east side of the Huron River in Washtenaw County, Michigan from 1844 until 1858. It broke off from the rest of Ypsilanti in 1844 due to a dispute over taxes and remained a separate village until the city was formed in 1858.

== Sources ==
- Romig, Walter (1986). Michigan Place Names. Detroit: Wayne State University Press. pp. 173–4. ISBN 978-0-8143-1838-6 – via Google Books.
