= I Am the Night =

I Am the Night may refer to:

- I Am the Night (album), 3rd studio album (1985) by American heavy metal band Pantera
- "I Am the Night" (Batman: The Animated Series), episode 49 (November 9, 1992) of American TV superhero series
- I Am the Night (TV series), six-episode American serial killer mystery on TNT starting January 27, 2019
- I Am the Night, album by Perturbator

== See also ==
- "I Am the Night—Color Me Black", episode 146 (March 27, 1964) of American TV anthology series The Twilight Zone
