= Civic Culture and Urban Change =

Civic Culture and Urban Change: Governing Dallas is a non-fiction book by Royce Hanson, published in 2003 by Wayne State University Press.

The book described the politics and government of Dallas.

The book argues that the culture around municipal governance had been damaged by an obsession by those in governance to keep up appearances.

== Background ==
Hanson had worked at the University of Texas at Dallas School of Social Sciences and at the Hubert Humphrey Institute of Public Affairs, as a dean and as an associate dean, respectively.

== Content ==
Five parts make up the book. The first part describes the waxing and then waning influence of entrepreneurs in the mid-2th Century. Land development, law enforcement, and government-run education are covered in the subsequent two parts. The political machinations and the people in politics are covered in the fourth part. The author's advice on how to govern Dallas is in the fifth part.

== Reception ==
Edward J. Harpham of UT Dallas stated that he wished it was easier for a reader to process the amount of people to deal with, although Harpham believed that the issue pertained to Dallas politics instead of the book itself. Additionally, Harpham believed that ordering events by time would have been a better approach.

Suzanne M. Leland of the University of North Carolina at Charlotte, the author, regarded the work as "insightful and normative".
