= Black Indian (book) =

Black Indian is a memoir by Shonda Buchanan published in 2019 by Wayne State University Press. It received the 2020 Indie New Generation Book Award and was included on the PBS NewsHour list of recommended reading on institutional racism.

It was reviewed in the Los Angeles Review of Books, Kirkus Reviews, and Foreword, and was a finalist for the 2024 American Legacy Book Awards.

== Synopsis ==
Buchanan's memoir Black Indian was published by Wayne State University Press in August 2019 as part of the Made in Michigan Writers Series. The 320-page book traces her family's multiracial history across six generations, documenting the hidden histories of families with mixed African American and Native American ancestry. In a 2019 interview with The Rumpus, Buchanan described the memoir as "a prayer for my family" that took ten years to write.

== Critical reception ==
Black Indian received attention from several national review outlets. Kirkus Reviews called it "a unique account of the damage inflicted on blacks and Native Americans in the late 1800s" and noted that Buchanan "tackles her difficulties with humor," while observing that the writing was strongest when examining how federal policies fractured her sense of identity.

Writing in the Los Angeles Review of Books, Eisa Nefertari Ulen described the book as "a quintessentially American narrative" and praised Buchanan for deconstructing the "black-white binary" through documentation of mixed-race ancestry rendered invisible in official records. Karl Helicher, reviewing for Foreword, gave the memoir five stars and wrote that it was "an emotionally draining memoir that is also resonant in its discussions of poverty's destructive forces."

The Hawaiʻi Review of Books conducted an interview about the memoir, and an American Library Association review described it as a "grimly haunting memoir" that "reveals many aspects of American racism and sexism." Academic analysis of the work includes a 2021 University of Michigan doctoral dissertation examining Indigenous subjectivity in contemporary memoir, which situates Black Indian within a broader tradition of Native American life writing.

== Honors and awards ==
- 2020 Indie New Generation Book Award, for Black Indian
- 2024 American Legacy Book Awards finalist (Autobiography/Memoir), for Black Indian
- PBS NewsHour "Top 20 books to read to learn about institutional racism" (2020)
