= The Big Tall Wish =

- The Twilight Zone episode
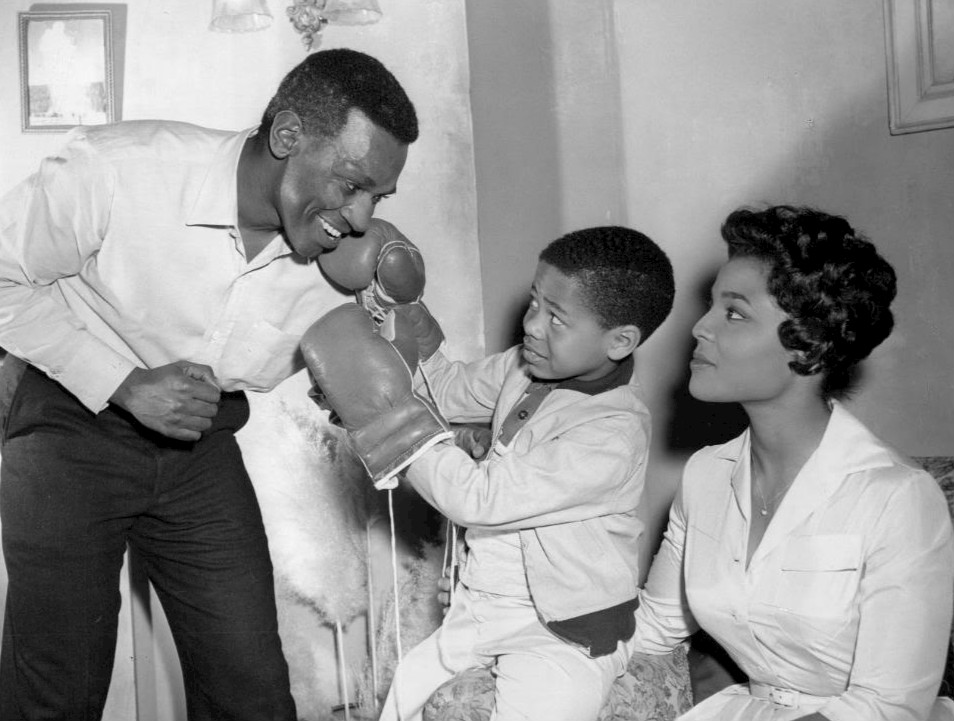
- Ivan Dixon, Steven Perry and Kim Hamilton in a specially posed publicity shot for "The Big Tall Wish"
- Episode no.: Season 1 Episode 27
- Directed by: Ron Winston
- Written by: Rod Serling
- Production code: 173-3630
- Original air date: April 8, 1960

Guest appearances
- Ivan Dixon as Bolie Jackson; Stephen Perry as Henry Temple; Kim Hamilton as Frances Temple; Walter Burke as Joe Mizell; Charles Horvath as Joey Consiglio; Carl McIntire as Announcer

Episode chronology
← Previous "Execution"	Next → "A Nice Place to Visit"
- The Twilight Zone (1959 TV series, season 1)

"The Big Tall Wish" is episode twenty-seven of the American television anthology series The Twilight Zone, with an original score by Jerry Goldsmith. It originally aired on April 8, 1960, on CBS. This was one of a few Twilight Zone episodes to feature black actors in lead roles, a rarity for American television of the era.

== Opening narration ==
In this corner of the universe, a prizefighter named Bolie Jackson, 183 pounds and an hour and a half away from a comeback at St. Nick's Arena. Mr. Bolie Jackson, who, by the standards of his profession is an aging, over-the-hill relic of what was, and who now sees a reflection of a man who has left too many pieces of his youth in too many stadiums for too many years before too many screaming people. Mr. Bolie Jackson, who might do well to look for some gentle magic in the hard-surfaced glass that stares back at him.

== Plot ==
Washed-up boxer Bolie Jackson spends time before a comeback fight with his young friend Henry Temple, the young son of Bolie's neighbor Frances. Henry says he is going to make "the biggest, tallest wish" for Bolie, who then departs for the fight. After Bolie accidentally punches the wall and injures his knuckles in a backstage argument, he proceeds with the fight anyway. He is knocked down and just about to be counted out, when suddenly, he magically switches places with the other boxer. Bolie is now standing over his vanquished opponent.

Bolie celebrates his victory, though he cannot understand what happened. He remembers being knocked down and has no memory of getting back up to win, nor can he figure out why his knuckles feel fine; he figures they must have only been bruised. His manager is stumped as to why Bolie thinks he was knocked down and explains that this did not happen.

Upon returning home, Henry has an explanation for what happened. Henry tells Bolie about the wish he made during the fight, and that it came true. Bolie cannot accept this, but Henry warns him that wishes only have power if people believe in them. Bolie tells Henry that he has been wishing for success all his life, but only has scars to show for it. Henry begs Bolie to believe in the wish, but Bolie insists he cannot. Suddenly, he is transported back to the fight, lying on the canvas after his knockdown, and the referee finishes counting him out.

Neither Bolie nor Henry has any memory of the alternate outcome. Henry remembers making the biggest wish he possibly could for Bolie, but since it did not work, he declares with resignation that he will not be making any more wishes. "There ain't no such thing as magic, is there?" he asks Bolie. "I guess not, Henry," Bolie replies sadly. "Or maybe...maybe there is magic. And maybe there's wishes, too. I guess the trouble is...I guess the trouble is there's not enough people around to believe."

== Closing narration ==
Mr. Bolie Jackson, 183 pounds, who left a second chance lying in a heap on a rosin-spattered canvas at St. Nick's Arena. Mr. Bolie Jackson, who shares the most common ailment of all men, the strange and perverse disinclination to believe in a miracle, the kind of miracle to come from the mind of a little boy, perhaps only to be found in the Twilight Zone.

== Production notes ==
The all-black principal cast was groundbreaking for television in 1960. Said Rod Serling at the time (quoted in The Twilight Zone Companion by Marc Scott Zicree):

Television, like its big sister, the motion picture, has been guilty of the sin of omission... Hungry for talent, desperate for the so-called 'new face,' constantly searching for a transfusion of new blood, it has overlooked a source of wondrous talent that resides under its nose. This is the Negro actor.

A few other Twilight Zones followed the example of this episode and cast black actors in significant roles, including the pastor in "I Am the Night—Color Me Black" (also played by Ivan Dixon), a child in the mall in "The Night of the Meek", and the electrician in "The Brain Center at Whipple's". These inclusions, though seemingly insignificant by modern standards, were so revolutionary at the time that The Twilight Zone was awarded the Unity Award for Outstanding Contributions to Better Race Relations in 1961.

Originally cast in the lead role was champion boxer Archie Moore, who later exclaimed, "Man, I was in the Twilight Zone!" when describing the punch delivered by his opponent Yvon Durelle.

This is one of several episodes from season one where some broadcast prints have the opening title sequence replaced with that of season two. This was done during the summer of 1961 to help the season one shows fit in with the new look the show had taken during the following season.

The hallway shown in this episode is also used in "Mr. Bevis", episode 33, but slightly altered. However, the door and stair railings remain the same.

The boxing match takes place at "St. Nick's Arena", which was the name of a boxing arena in New York City, the St. Nicholas Rink.
