= Ivan Dixon =

American actor, director, producer (1931–2008)

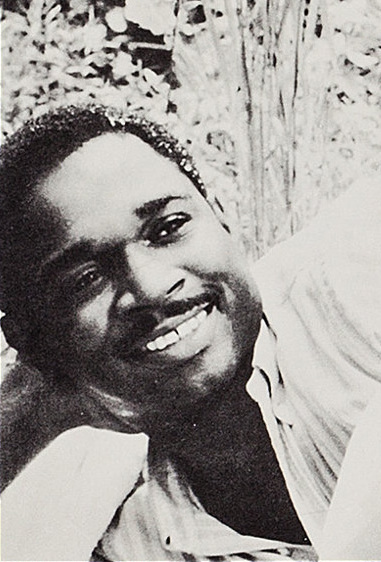
- Dixon in 1964
- Born: Ivan Nathaniel Dixon III; April 6, 1931; New York City, U.S.
- Died: March 16, 2008 (aged 76); Charlotte, North Carolina, U.S.
- Education: North Carolina Central University
- Occupations: Actor; director; producer
- Years active: 1957–1991
- Spouse: Berlie Ray Dixon (m.1954)
- Children: 4

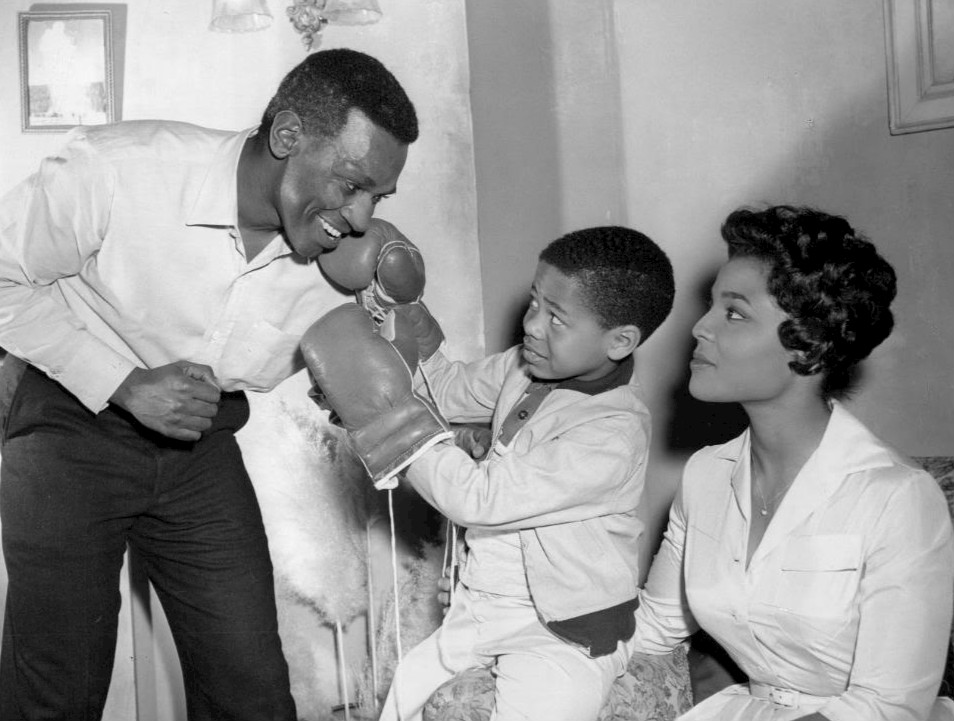
Dixon (left) with Steven Perry and Kim Hamilton in "The Big Tall Wish", a 1960 episode of The Twilight Zone

Ivan Nathaniel Dixon III (April 6, 1931 – March 16, 2008) was an American actor, director, and producer best known for his series role in the 1960s sitcom Hogan's Heroes, and for his starring roles in the 1964 independent drama Nothing But a Man and "The Final War of Olly Winter" (1967), the debut episode of the anthology series CBS Playhouse. In addition, he directed many episodes of television series.

Active in the civil rights movement from 1961, Dixon served as a president of Negro Actors for Action.

== Early life and education ==
Ivan Nathaniel Dixon III was born in Harlem, Manhattan, New York City, New York, the son of a grocery store owner and his wife, who together later owned a bakery. His parents separated when he was young, and he lived at his mother's apartment while working in his father's grocery store. His father, also named Ivan, fought with distinction in World War I and read Yiddish. When he was young, the family lived in a brownstone at 518 West 150th Street in Harlem, on the same block with Josh White, writer Ralph Ellison, and the tap-dancing brothers Gregory Hines and Maurice Hines.

Dixon graduated from Lincoln Academy, a private black boarding school in Gaston County, North Carolina. He subsequently earned a drama degree in 1954 from North Carolina Central University (NCCU), a historically black college. Its theater troupe is now known as the Ivan Dixon Players in his honor. While at NCCU, he joined the Omega Psi Phi fraternity.

Dixon also later studied drama at Case Western Reserve University, in Cleveland, Ohio, followed by the American Theatre Wing after returning to New York City.

== Career ==
Dixon appeared on stage, and in both movies and TV series or specials. In 1957, Dixon appeared on Broadway in William Saroyan's The Cave Dwellers. In 1959, he performed in Lorraine Hansberry's A Raisin in the Sun.

In 1958, he was a stunt double for Sidney Poitier in the film The Defiant Ones. Dixon was cast in two episodes of The Twilight Zone: "The Big Tall Wish" – as the lead, in a primarily black cast in a TV drama – and a key supporting role in "I Am the Night—Color Me Black". In 1962, Dixon co-starred with Dorothy Dandridge in the "Blues for a Junkman" episode of Cain's Hundred; it was the highest-rated episode of the series. An expanded version was released as a feature film in Europe as The Murder Men; this was Dandridge's last screen appearance.

On September 25, 1962, Dixon portrayed Jamie Davis, a livery stable groom, in the episode "Among the Missing" of NBC's Laramie western series. In that same year, he played a prosecution expert witness, in "The Case of the Promoters Pillbox" episode of Perry Mason. This was followed in 1963 when he played the role of John Brooks, alias Caleb Stone IV, in the episode "The Case of the Nebulous Nephew", in which his character switched names with a white man. Later, he appeared as a judge in the 1986 Perry Mason made-for-TV movie The Case of the Shooting Star.

In 1964, Dixon starred in the independent film Nothing But a Man, written and directed by Michael Roemer; Dixon said he was most proud of this performance. He also appeared in two episodes of ABC's The Fugitive: "Escape into Black" and "Dossier on a Diplomat".

In his best-known role, Dixon appeared as prisoner of war Staff Sergeant James "Kinch" Kinchloe in the ensemble cast of the television sitcom Hogan's Heroes. "Kinch" was the communications specialist, a translator of German, and Hogan's default second-in-command. Dixon played Kinchloe from 1965 to 1970, the only one of the series' long-time cast who did not stay for the entire series run. Kenneth Washington replaced Dixon for the last year of the show's run, playing a different character who filled a similar role.

Dixon was nominated for an Emmy Award for his performance in the TV movie The Final War of Olly Winter (1967).

=== Film work and directing ===
From 1970 to 1993, Dixon worked primarily as a television director on such series and TV movies as The Waltons, The Rockford Files, The Bionic Woman, The Eddie Capra Mysteries, Magnum, P.I., S.W.A.T. and The A-Team.

Dixon's first feature film as director was the blaxploitation thriller Trouble Man. He also directed the controversial 1973 feature film The Spook Who Sat by the Door, based on Sam Greenlee's 1969 novel of the same name. It was about the first black CIA agent, who applies his espionage knowledge to lead a black guerrilla operation in Chicago.

The New York Times wrote in 2008:

Although The Spook caused controversy and, with suppression facilitated by the F.B.I., was soon pulled from theaters, it later gained cult status as a bootleg video and in 2004 was released on DVD. At that time Mr. Dixon told The Times that the movie had tried only to depict black anger, not to suggest armed revolt as a solution.

Dixon occasionally took acting parts throughout the 1970s and '80s. Notable roles include Lonnie, the straw boss, in 1976's Car Wash (1976). Dixon played a doctor and leader of a guerrilla movement in the ABC miniseries Amerika (1987), set in post-Soviet invasion Nebraska.

In 1978, Dixon served as Chairman of the Expansion Arts Advisory Panel of the National Endowment for the Arts.

After his career as an actor and director, Dixon became owner-operator of radio station KONI (FM) on the Hawaiian island of Maui. In 2001, he left Hawaii for health reasons and sold the radio station in 2002.

== Personal life ==
In 1954, the same year Dixon graduated from North Carolina Central University, he married theater student Berlie Ray. The couple had four children: sons Ivan IV, N'Gai Christopher, and Alan Kimara Dixon; and daughter Doris Nomathande Dixon.

== Death ==
Dixon died on March 16, 2008, aged 76, at Presbyterian Hospital in Charlotte, North Carolina, of complications from kidney failure. He was predeceased by sons Ivan Dixon IV and N'Gai Christopher Dixon.

His widow Berlie Ray Dixon, born on April 5, 1930, in Badin, North Carolina, died on February 9, 2019, in Charlotte, at the age of 88.

== Filmography ==
Year	Title	Role	Notes
1957	Something of Value	Lathela, Loyal Gun-Bearer	Alternative title: Africa Ablaze
1959	Porgy and Bess	Jim	
1960	The Twilight Zone	Bolie Jackson	TV series, Episode: "The Big Tall Wish"
1961	Have Gun – Will Travel	Isham Spruce	TV series, "Long Way Home" (air date April 2, 1961)
1961	A Raisin in the Sun	Asagai	
1961	Battle at Bloody Beach	Tiger Blair	
1961	Too Late Blues	Party Guest	Uncredited, Directed by John Cassavetes
1962	Laramie	Jamie Davis	TV series, "Among the Missing" (Sept 25, 1962)
1962	Cain's Hundred	Joe Sherman	TV series, "Blues for a Junkman" (February 20, 1962), co-starring Dorothy Dandridge
1962	The New Breed	Wick	TV series, 2 episodes
1962	Perry Mason	Parness	TV series, Episode: "The Case of the Promoter's Pillbox"
1963	Perry Mason	Caleb Stone IV	TV series, Episode: "The Case of the Nebulous Nephew"
1963	Outer Limits	Major Harold Giles	TV series, Episode: "The Human Factor"
1963	Going My Way	Robin Green	TV series, "Run, Robin, Run"
1963	Stoney Burke	Dr. Manning	TV series, Episode: "The Test"
1964	Nothing But a Man	Duff Anderson	
1964	The Fugitive	Dr. Towne	Episode: "Escape Into Black"
1964	The Outer Limits	Sgt. James Conover	Episode: "The Inheritors"
1964	The Man from U.N.C.L.E.	Jean Francis Soumarin	TV series, Episode: "The Vulcan Affair"
1964	The Twilight Zone	Reverend Anderson	TV series, Episode: "I Am the Night—Color Me Black"
1965	I Spy	Elroy Brown	TV series, Episode: "So Long, Patrick Henry"
1965	A Patch of Blue	Mark Ralfe	
1965–1970	Hogan's Heroes	Staff Sergeant James Kinchloe	TV series, 145 episodes
1967	The Fugitive	Ambassador Unawa	TV series, Episode: "Dossier on a Diplomat"
1967	CBS Playhouse	Olly Winter	TV play, The Final War of Olly Winter
1968	It Takes a Thief	General Kristoff	TV series, Episode: "Get Me to the Revolution on Time"
1969	Where's Jack?	Naval Officer	
1970	The F.B.I.	Terrance Maynard	TV series, Episode: "The Deadly Pact"
1970	Suppose They Gave a War and Nobody Came	Sgt. Jones	Alternative title: War Games
1971	The Fourth Bill Cosby Special, Or?		TV special, Director
1971	Clay Pigeon	Simon	
1971–1972	Nichols		TV series, Director, 4 episodes
1972	Trouble Man		Director
1973	The Spook Who Sat by the Door		Director
1974–1975	The Waltons		TV series, Director, 7 episodes
1974	Claudine	Wedding Guest	Uncredited
1975	Starsky & Hutch		TV series, Director, 1 episode
1975–1979	The Rockford Files		TV series, Director, 9 episodes
1976	Car Wash	Lonnie	
1977	McCloud		TV series, Director, 1 episode
1977	Quincy, M.E.		TV series, Director, 1 episode
1978	The Bionic Woman		TV series, Director, 1 episode
1979	Wonder Woman		TV series, Director, 1 episode
1981–1982	Bret Maverick		TV series, Director, 3 episodes
1981–1983	The Greatest American Hero		TV series, Director, 6 episodes
1984	Airwolf		TV series, Director, 1 episode
1984	Trapper John, M.D.		TV series, Director, 1 episode
1984	The A-Team		TV series, Director, 1 episode
1982–1986	Magnum, P.I.		TV series, Director, 13 episodes
1986	Perry Mason	Judge	TV film: "The Case of the Shooting Star"
1987	Amerika	Dr. Alan Drummond	TV miniseries, 7 parts
1989	Quantum Leap		TV series, Director, 1 episode
1989	In the Heat of the Night		TV series, Director, 1 episode
1991	Father Dowling Mysteries	Rev. Johnson	TV series, Episode: "The Joyful Noise Mystery", (final appearance)
1993	Percy & Thunder		Director

== Awards and honors ==
- National Black Theatre Award
- Paul Robeson Pioneer Award, Black American Cinema Society
- 1967 – Emmy Awards nomination, Outstanding Single Performance by an Actor in a Leading Role in a Drama, The Final War of Olly Winter
