= Blade in Hong Kong =

1985 action/adventure television film by Reza Badiyi

- Genre: Action, crime
- Based on: Blade in Hong Kong by Terry Becker
- Written by: Gordon Cotler
- Directed by: Reza Badiyi
- Starring: Terry Lester; Leslie Nielsen
- Music by: David Kurtz
- Country of origin: United States
- Original language: English

Production
- Producer: Terry Becker
- Cinematography: Woody Omens
- Editor: Leon Carrere
- Running time: 91 minutes
- Production company: Becker Enterprises Productions

Original release
- Network: CBS
- Release: May 15, 1985

Blade in Hong Kong is a 1985 American action/adventure television film directed by Iranian-born director Reza Badiyi. It is based on a novel by Terry Becker. It stars Terry Lester as a suave private eye who becomes embroiled in a battle against the Hong Kong underworld.

== Plot ==
Blade is a private investigator and the adopted son of a wealthy business tycoon in British Hong Kong in the 1980s. When a criminal gang attempts to murder Blade's father at his retirement party, Blade chases after the would-be assassins and uncovers a people smuggling scheme from mainland China and a hostage situation. This further leads him to accidentally collide with an elaborate plan to steal a priceless sacred artifact. Blade clashes with the Royal Hong Kong Police Force over their disbelief of his story and takes matters into his own hands to free the hostage and reclaim the stolen artifact.

== Cast ==
- Terry Lester as Joe Blade
- Leslie Nielsen as Harry Ingersoll
- Nancy Kwan as Lily
- Keye Luke as Chang Chin-tzu
- James Hong as Key Tam
- Jean Marie Hon as Mei-Ling
- Ellen Regan as Krista Vale
- Anthony Newley as Tommy T
- Michael Preston as Charters
