= Sam Greenlee =

American novelist and poet (1930–2014)

- Born: Samuel Eldred Greenlee, Jr. July 13, 1930; Chicago, Illinois, US
- Died: May 19, 2014 (aged 83); Chicago, Illinois, US
- Education: Englewood High School; University of Wisconsin; University of Chicago
- Children: Natiki Montano
- Writing career
- Notable work: The Spook Who Sat by the Door (1969)
- Notable awards: Poet laureate of Chicago
- Website: www.sgjlegacy.com

Samuel Eldred Greenlee, Jr. (July 13, 1930 – May 19, 2014) was an American writer of fiction and poetry. He is best known for his novel The Spook Who Sat by the Door, first published in March 1969 in London by the recently founded small imprint Allison & Busby (with Ghanaian-born Margaret Busby as its editor), having been rejected by dozens of mainstream publishers, and received much critical attention, including extracts being printed in The Observer newspaper. The novel was subsequently made into the 1973 movie of the same name, directed by Ivan Dixon and co-produced and written by Greenlee, that is now considered a cult classic and in 2012, was selected for preservation in the National Film Registry.

== Life and work ==
=== Early years and education ===
Sam Greenlee was born in St. Luke's Hospital, Chicago, Illinois, to an African-American family. His parents were singer and dancer Desoree Alexander and railroad man and union activist Samuel Greenlee. He grew up in west Woodlawn. He attended Englewood High School, and in 1948 won a track scholarship to the University of Wisconsin, graduating in 1952 with a BS degree in political science. He was a member of Kappa Alpha Psi fraternity (Beta Omicron 1950). He served in the United States Army from 1952 to 1954, earning the rank of first lieutenant, and from 1954 to 1957 did graduate studies in international relations at the University of Chicago.

=== U.S. foreign service ===
In 1957, Greenlee began a career with the United States Information Agency (USIA), and, as one of the first black officials to work overseas, served in Iraq, Pakistan, Indonesia, and Greece between 1957 and 1965. In 1958, he was awarded the Meritorious Service Medal for bravery during the 14 July Revolution in Baghdad.

Leaving the USIA after eight years, he stayed on in Greece, where he undertook further study (1963–64) at the University of Thessaloniki, and lived for three years on the island of Mykonos with his Dutch-born first wife, Nienke de Jonge.

=== Writing career ===
==== The Spook Who Sat by the Door ====
It was while living on Mykonos that Greenlee began to write his first and best known novel, The Spook Who Sat by the Door, which was the story of a black man, Dan Freeman, who is recruited as a CIA officer and having mastered the skills of espionage then uses them to lead a black guerrilla movement in the United States. Greenlee drew on his own background and his career in the US Foreign Service, and in a 1973 interview with the Washington Post he said: "My experiences were identical to those of Freeman in the CIA....Everything in that book is an actual quote. If it wasn't said to me, I overheard it."

The novel's title incorporates a double-entendre, "spook" being a racial slur for a black person as well as slang for "spy", or intelligence agent ("because they’re supposed to be invisible", Greenlee said), the dual meaning going beyond the more obvious use of the word "('because we're supposed to be scared of ghosts,' Greenlee said). ... But his sardonic wordplay, Greenlee insisted, had a third layer of meaning: 'that an armed revolution by Black people haunts White America, and has for centuries.'"

Rejected multiple times by mainstream publishers on both sides of the Atlantic, The Spook Who Sat by the Door was eventually published in London in March 1969 by fledgling company Allison and Busby, Greenlee having been introduced to young Ghanaian-born publisher Margaret Busby by a mutual friend, poet Alexis Lykiard, who had met him in Mykonos. The book achieved significant critical attention and was subsequently published in the US by Richard W. Baron.

Greenlee later co-wrote (with Mel Clay) the screenplay for what became the 1973 film The Spook Who Sat by the Door that he co-produced with director Ivan Dixon, and which is considered "one of the more memorable and impassioned films that came out around the beginning of the notoriously polarizing blaxploitation era." In 2011, an independent documentary entitled Infiltrating Hollywood: The Rise and Fall of the Spook Who Sat by the Door was filmed by Christine Acham and Clifford Ward, about the making and reception of the Spook film, in which Greenlee spoke out about the suppression of the film soon after its release. In a chance meeting with Aubrey Lewis (1935–2001), one of the first Black FBI agents to have been recruited in 1962 by the FBI, Greenlee was told that The Spook Who Sat by the Door was required reading at the FBI Academy in Quantico, Virginia. In 2012, the film was selected for preservation in the National Film Registry, which annually chooses 25 films that are "culturally, historically or aesthetically significant".

==== Other writings ====
Other works by Greenlee include Baghdad Blues, a 1976 novel based on his experiences traveling in Iraq in the 1950s and witnessing the 1958 Iraqi revolution, Blues for an African Princess (a 1971 collection of poems), and Ammunition (poetry, 1975). He also wrote short stories, plays (although he found no producer for any of them), and the screenplay for a film short called Lisa Trotter (2010), a story adapted from Aristophanes' Lysistrata.

=== Later years ===
Greenlee lived in Ghana and Spain for some years, before returning to Chicago in the late 1980s. His marriage to Nienke Greenlee ended in divorce, and in 1978, he was also briefly married to actress Yvette Hawkins; subsequently, from a long-term relationship with Maxine McCrey, he had a daughter, Natiki. In 1990, he was named the Poet Laureate of Chicago. He taught screenwriting at Columbia College Chicago and hosted a talk show on WVON radio. He also worked on an autobiography that was to be called Sam's Blues: Adventures of a Travelling Man.

== Death and legacy ==
On May 19, 2014, Greenlee died in Chicago at the age of 83. On June 6, 2014, Chicago's DuSable Museum of African American History sponsored an evening of celebration in his honor, attended by his daughter Natiki Montano.

In 2018, Greenlee was inducted into the Chicago Literary Hall of Fame, the website of which notes: "For Greenlee, his art and his life seemed inseparable, and his masterful output relied on the Chicago to which he was born, raised, and forever devoted, no matter how far his adventures took him."

On July 13, 2022, which would have been his 92nd birthday, Sam Greenlee Day was celebrated around Chicago's South Side.

== Bibliography ==
Novels

- The Spook Who Sat by the Door, London, UK: Allison & Busby, 1969; US edition Richard W. Baron Publishing Co., 1969. Detroit: Wayne State University Press, 1989; new edition with Introduction by Natiki Hope Pressley, 2022. New UK edition with Introduction by Margaret Busby and Afterword by Natiki Hope Pressley, London: Jacaranda Books, 2024.
- Baghdad Blues, New York: Bantam Books, 1976.

Poetry

- Blues for an African Princess, Chicago: Third World Press, 1971.
- Ammunition!: Poetry and Other Raps (introduction by Andrew Salkey), London: Bogle-L'Ouverture, 1975.
- Be-Bop Man/Be-Bop Woman, 1968–1993: Poetry and Other Raps, Cambrea Heights, NY: Natiki, 1995.

Short stories

- "Yes, We Can Sing", Negro Digest, 15.2 (December 1965), pp. 65–69.
- "The Sign", Negro Digest, 15.4 (February 1966), pp. 61–66.
- "Summer Sunday", Negro Digest, 15.11 (September 1966), pp. 60–61.
- "Autumn Leaves", in Negro Digest 16.3 (January 1967), pp. 69–73.
- "The D.C. Blues", Negro Digest, 18.8 (June 1969), pp. 86–92.
- "Sonny's Seasons", Black World, 19.12 (October 1970), pp. 58–63.
- "Sonny's Not Blue", in Woodie King (ed.), Black Short Story Anthology, New York: Signet, 1972, pp. 91–96.
- "Blues for Little Prez", in Black World, 22.10 (August 1973), pp. 54–62. Reprinted in Sascha Feinstein and David Rife (eds), The Jazz Fiction Anthology, Indiana University Press, 2009, pp. 205–13.
