= Terry Becker =

American actor, director and producer (1921–2014)

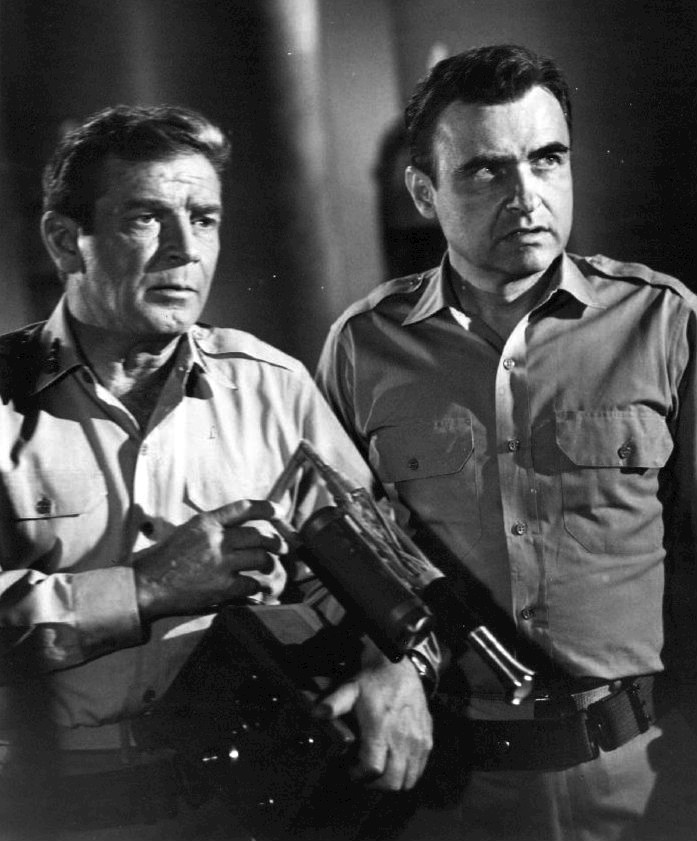
- From TV's Voyage to the Bottom of the Sea: Richard Basehart (left) and Terry Becker (right) (1968)
- Born: Solomon Becker; August 5, 1921; New York City, U.S.
- Died: December 30, 2014 (aged 93); Los Angeles, California, U.S.

Terry Becker (August 5, 1921 – December 30, 2014) was an American film and television actor, director and producer.

== Career ==
Becker portrayed Chief Francis Ethelbert Sharkey in seasons 2 through 4 of the television series Voyage to the Bottom of the Sea. Becker took the role after the death of actor Henry Kulky, who had played the submarine's Chief (Curly Jones) during the first season of the series. Becker also made two guest appearances on Perry Mason. In 1958 he played murder victim Philip Larkin in "The Case of the Prodigal Parent", and in 1960 he played Prosecuting Attorney Everett Ransome in "The Case of the Violent Village."

Becker's work behind the camera began with the TV series Room 222, on which he was associate producer. He also directed eight episodes of the series. Becker went on to directing assignments on many other TV series, including Mission: Impossible, M*A*S*H, Love, American Style, The Brady Bunch and others, plus a motion picture, The Thirsty Dead, which he also produced. In 1973, he partnered with actor Carroll O'Connor to form O'Connor-Becker Productions. In 1983, the partnership split up and Becker continued producing as a solo producer under his own Becker Productions and Becker Enterprises banners.

== Partial filmography as actor ==
- Danger (1951-1952, TV Series) .... Lou
- Short Short Dramas (1953, TV Series)
- Teacher's Pet (1958) .... Mr. Appino (uncredited)
- The Fiend Who Walked the West (1958) .... Lew Lane (uncredited)
- Compulsion (1959) .... Benson, Angry Reporter (uncredited)
- Wanted Dead or Alive (1960, TV Series) .... Deputy Fred Kimball (billed as Adam Becker)
- Perry Mason (1958-1960, TV Series) .... Everett Ransome / Philip Larkin
- Gunsmoke (1955) .... Emmett
- Code of Silence (1960) .... Mike Story
- The Asphalt Jungle (1961, TV Series) .... Ira Fallon
- Sea Hunt (1961, TV Series) .... Putnam's Agent / Alcott - Newspaper Reporter
- Combat! (1963, TV Series), Season 2 Episode:15 "The Party" .... / Sgt Claybourne
- The Twilight Zone (1964, TV Series, Episode: "I Am the Night Color Me Black") .... Jagger
- Rawhide (1959-1964, TV Series) .... Burt / Seth Warner
- Voyage to the Bottom of the Sea (1965-1968, TV Series, Main Character) .... Chief Francis Ethelbert Sharkey
- The Writer (2004) .... Dr. Norman Solomon
- Neighborhood Watch (2005) .... Judd Sowell
- Finishing the Game (2007) .... Breeze's Dad
- In Case of Emergency (2007, TV Series Episode: "Disorder in the Court") .... Judge
- Infection: The Invasion Begins (2010) .... Grandpa Sy (final film role)

== Partial filmography as producer-director ==
- The Thirsty Dead, motion picture, producer-director, 1974
- Bronk, executive producer TV series 1975-76
- Hallmark Hall of Fame The Last Hurrah, TV movie, executive producer, 1977
- Bender, TV series, executive producer, 1979
- Riding for the Pony Express, TV movie, producer, 1980
- Archie Bunker's Place, TV series, 1979-83 O'Connor-Becker Company
- Savage in the Orient, TV movie- TV series pilot, executive producer 1983
- Blade in Hong Kong, TV movie, producer, 1985
- Room 222, associate producer 26 episodes 1969-70
- Room 222, TV series, director 8 episodes 1969-71
- The Courtship of Eddie's Father, TV series, director, 1970
- The Mod Squad, TV series, director, 1970
- Love, American Style, TV series, director, 1970–72
- The Brady Bunch, TV series, director, 1971
- Mission: Impossible, TV series, director, 1970–72
- M*A*S*H, TV series, director 1972
