= The Fever (The Twilight Zone) =

- The Twilight Zone episode
- Episode no.: Season 1 Episode 17
- Directed by: Robert Florey
- Written by: Rod Serling
- Production code: 173-3627
- Original air date: January 29, 1960

Guest appearances
- Everett Sloane as Franklin Gibbs; Vivi Janiss as Flora Gibbs

Episode chronology
← Previous "The Hitch-Hiker"	Next → "The Last Flight"
- The Twilight Zone (1959 TV series, season 1)

"The Fever" is the seventeenth episode of the American television anthology series The Twilight Zone. It originally aired on January 29, 1960, on CBS. The complete, original text for this story was run in the debut issue of Harvey Kurtzman’s Help!, cover dated August, 1960.

== Opening narration ==
Mr. and Mrs. Franklin Gibbs, three days and two nights all expenses paid at a Las Vegas hotel, won by virtue of Mrs. Gibbs's knack with a phrase. But unbeknownst to either Mr. or Mrs. Gibbs is the fact that there's a prize in their package, neither expected nor bargained for. In just a moment, one of them will succumb to an illness worse than any virus can produce. A most inoperative, deadly life-shattering affliction known as the Fever.

== Plot ==
Franklin Gibbs and his wife Flora go to Las Vegas because she won a slogan contest. He detests gambling, but his wife is excited about their vacation. In a casino, she puts a nickel in a slot machine and Franklin admonishes her for wasting money. She convinces him to let her pull the arm since she already put the money in, but wins nothing on the spin. Happy that his point was made, he implores her to go back to their room so they can get ready for dinner. As they walk, Franklin is given a silver dollar by a drunk man who makes him use it in a different machine that advertises a $10,000 jackpot. He wins a few dollars and tells Flora that they should keep the winnings and not lose it back like other people. As they depart, Franklin believes he hears the slot machine calling his name in a monstrous-sounding voice.

Franklin continues to hear the voice as he tries to sleep. He gets out of bed, telling his wife he cannot keep "tainted" money, and that he is going to get rid of it by putting it back in the machine. Later, Flora goes to the casino and finds Franklin playing the machine obsessively. When Flora tries to coax him to stop, he declares that he has lost so much that he has to try to win some of it back. He becomes enraged when she presses him to leave; he declares that the machine is "inhuman," that it "teases you, [...] sucks you in." The casino workers watch and talk about him as he constantly plays and ignores his wife's pleas to go to bed. When Franklin puts his last dollar into the machine, it suddenly malfunctions and the reels will not spin. He loses his temper, knocks the machine over, and is taken screaming out of the casino.

Later in bed, Franklin tells Flora that it was about to pay off, but deliberately broke down so that it would not have to give him his money. He again hears the machine calling his name, then sees it coming down the hallway toward the couple's room and pursuing him. To his horror, its coin hopper is now covered by a hood etched with a large smile. Flora can neither see nor hear the machine as it backs Franklin up toward the window, until he crashes backwards through it and falls to his death. The police stand over his body, noting that his wife had stated that he had not slept in 24 hours, and a casino manager comments that he has never seen anyone develop a gambling addiction so quickly and severely. Franklin's last dollar rolls across the pavement to stop by his outstretched hand, and the camera pans in the direction from which it came and there sits the slot machine, "smiling".

== Closing narration ==
Mr. Franklin Gibbs, visitor to Las Vegas, who lost his money, his reason, and finally his life to an inanimate, metal machine, variously described as a "one-armed bandit", a "slot machine", or, in Mr. Franklin Gibbs' words, a "monster with a will all of its own." For our purposes, we'll stick with the latter definition because we're in the Twilight Zone.

== Episode notes ==
In Serling: The Rise and Twilight of Television's Last Angry Man, Gordon F. Sander wrote, "Serling celebrated the signing of his new show, The Twilight Zone by spending a weekend in Las Vegas. While Carol Serling was having good luck nearby, he became enslaved by a merciless one-armed bandit, an incident he would turn into one of his first Twilight Zone episodes."

The slot machine was reused in the later episodes "A Nice Place to Visit" and "The Prime Mover".
