= A Nice Place to Visit =

- The Twilight Zone episode
- Episode no.: Season 1 Episode 28
- Directed by: John Brahm
- Written by: Charles Beaumont
- Production code: 173-3632
- Original air date: April 15, 1960

Guest appearances
- Larry Blyden as Henry Francis "Rocky" Valentine; Sebastian Cabot as Mr. Pip

Episode chronology
← Previous "The Big Tall Wish"	Next → "Nightmare as a Child"
- The Twilight Zone (1959 TV series, season 1)

"A Nice Place to Visit" is episode 28 of the American television anthology series The Twilight Zone. The episode first aired on CBS on April 15, 1960. The title comes from the saying, "It's a nice place to visit, but I wouldn't want to live there."

In 1965, a slightly modified version of this story was broadcast on the radio program Theater Five. "The Land of Milk and Honey", episode number 154, retained all of the important aspects of this episode, including the innuendos and the surprise ending. On November 14, 1935, the radio program The Fleischmann's Yeast Hour hosted by Rudy Vallee broadcast a play titled The Other Place starring Colin Clive and Leo G. Carroll. It was written by John Balderston and dealt with a similar theme.

== Opening narration ==
Portrait of a man at work, the only work he's ever done, the only work he knows. His name is Henry Francis Valentine, but he calls himself "Rocky", because that's the way his life has been – rocky and perilous and uphill at a dead run all the way. He's tired now, tired of running or wanting, of waiting for the breaks that come to others but never to him, never to Rocky Valentine.

The narration continues after Rocky is shot by the cops.

A scared, angry little man. He thinks it's all over now, but he's wrong. For Rocky Valentine, it's just the beginning.

== Plot ==
After robbing a pawn shop, Henry Francis "Rocky" Valentine is shot in a gunfight by a police officer as he tries to flee. He wakes up to find himself seemingly unharmed by the encounter as a genial, heavyset, elderly white-suited man named Pip greets him. Rocky nicknames Pip "Fatso".

Pip explains that he has been instructed to guide Rocky and give him whatever he desires. Rocky becomes suspicious, supposing that Pip is attempting to defraud him, but Pip proves to have detailed information about Rocky's tastes and hobbies. Rocky demands that Pip hand over his wallet; Pip says that he does not carry one, but gives Rocky $700 directly from his pocket and says that he can provide as much money as Rocky wants.

Thinking that Pip is trying to entice him to commit a crime, Rocky holds him at gunpoint as the two travel to a luxurious apartment. Pip explains that the apartment and everything in it are free, and Rocky starts to relax and changes into an expensive suit. His suspicions arise again, however, when a meal is brought in, and he demands that Pip taste it first to prove that it is not poisoned. When Pip demurs, claiming he has forgotten how to eat after not doing so for centuries, Rocky shoots him several times, but finds that his bullets have no effect. Rocky realizes that he is dead, and he concludes that he must be in Heaven and Pip is his guardian angel. Pip looks at him oddly but only says that Rocky can have anything he wants. Rocky asks for $1 million and a beautiful woman, and quickly has both requests fulfilled.

Rocky visits a casino with three women, winning every bet he makes as beautiful girls gather around him, and enjoys being able to torment a policeman after Pip causes the man to shrink. Later, Rocky asks Pip if he can see some of his old friends who have also died, but Pip says that this world is for Rocky alone. Except for the two men, no one in it is real. When Rocky wonders what good deeds he could have done to gain entrance to Heaven, Pip takes him to visit the Hall of Records. Rocky looks through his own file and discovers that it only contains a list of his crimes, but decides not to worry about it. Pip departs, saying that he can be reached by telephone as needed.

One month later, Rocky has become bored with having his whims instantly satisfied. He wins every game at the casino, and the women do anything he wants. He refuses his latest winnings and kicks the women out of his apartment. A pool table magically appears at his whim, but it too is designed so he wins without effort. When this happens, he breaks the cue in anger. He calls Pip, who instantly appears, and asks for a challenge in which he might run the risk of losing. Pip offers to arrange for him to lose once in a while at the casino, but Rocky dismisses the idea as he would know about the setup. Pip suggests robbing a bank, but Rocky quickly abandons that idea as well, since a pre-planned outcome would take the thrill out of the crime. Rocky muses to Pip over his lack of satisfaction at being given everything he wants with no effort or risk. Deciding that he will go insane if he stays in this stifling paradise any longer, Rocky asks Pip to send him to "the other place" — insisting that he does not belong in Heaven. Pip retorts, "Heaven? Whatever gave you the idea you were in Heaven, Mr. Valentine? This IS the other place!"

A now horrified Rocky pulls on the now locked door. As he desperately tries to escape, Pip laughs evilly and maniacally.

== Closing narration ==
A scared, angry little man who never got a break. Now he has everything he's ever wanted – And he's going to have to live with it for eternity – In The Twilight Zone.

== Production notes ==
- Mickey Rooney was the first choice to play Valentine. In a memo to Rod Serling, Charles Beaumont proposed, should Rooney not be available, that Serling consider playing the part. Serling declined and Rooney was unavailable. Rooney later guest starred in "The Last Night of a Jockey".
- Guest star Cabot had to bleach his hair white for the role; it took three months for the actor's hair to return to its original dark color.
- "A Nice Place to Visit" was singled out for its brazen (for the time) sexual innuendo. Program Practices requested that Valentine not refer to a girl as "a broad [...] really stacked", even though the crudity was essential to establishing the unsavory qualities of the character. Nor could the protagonist refer to a party as "a ball" because that word had more than one meaning. In another sequence, a voluptuous young lady tends to Valentine's every need, then says, "is there anything else I can do for you?" CBS's comment: "Please be certain that the girl's third speech be delivered in a sweet manner, as described."

== Popular culture ==
The unreleased They Might Be Giants song "Hell Hotel" is based on "A Nice Place to Visit". According to producer Bill Krauss, the song references the episode's plot and lead actor Sebastian Cabot.

Donald Trump has said that this episode of The Twilight Zone inspired his philosophy of success, commenting, "I fight hard for victory, and I think I enjoy it as much as I ever did. But I realize that maybe new victories won't be the same as the first couple."

The "I Dated a Robot" episode of Futurama begins with the main characters watching an episode of The Scary Door (a parody of the Twilight Zone). It begins with a man named Clyde Smith in a casino where he always wins. It also includes nods to other episodes, including "The Fever", "He's Alive", "The Man in the Bottle", and "Nightmare at 20,000 Feet".

The episode is mentioned in The Sopranos episode "Chasing It."

The Michael Schur comedy The Good Place has been noted as having a similar premise and plot twist as "A Nice Place to Visit".
