= Kim Hamilton =

American actress

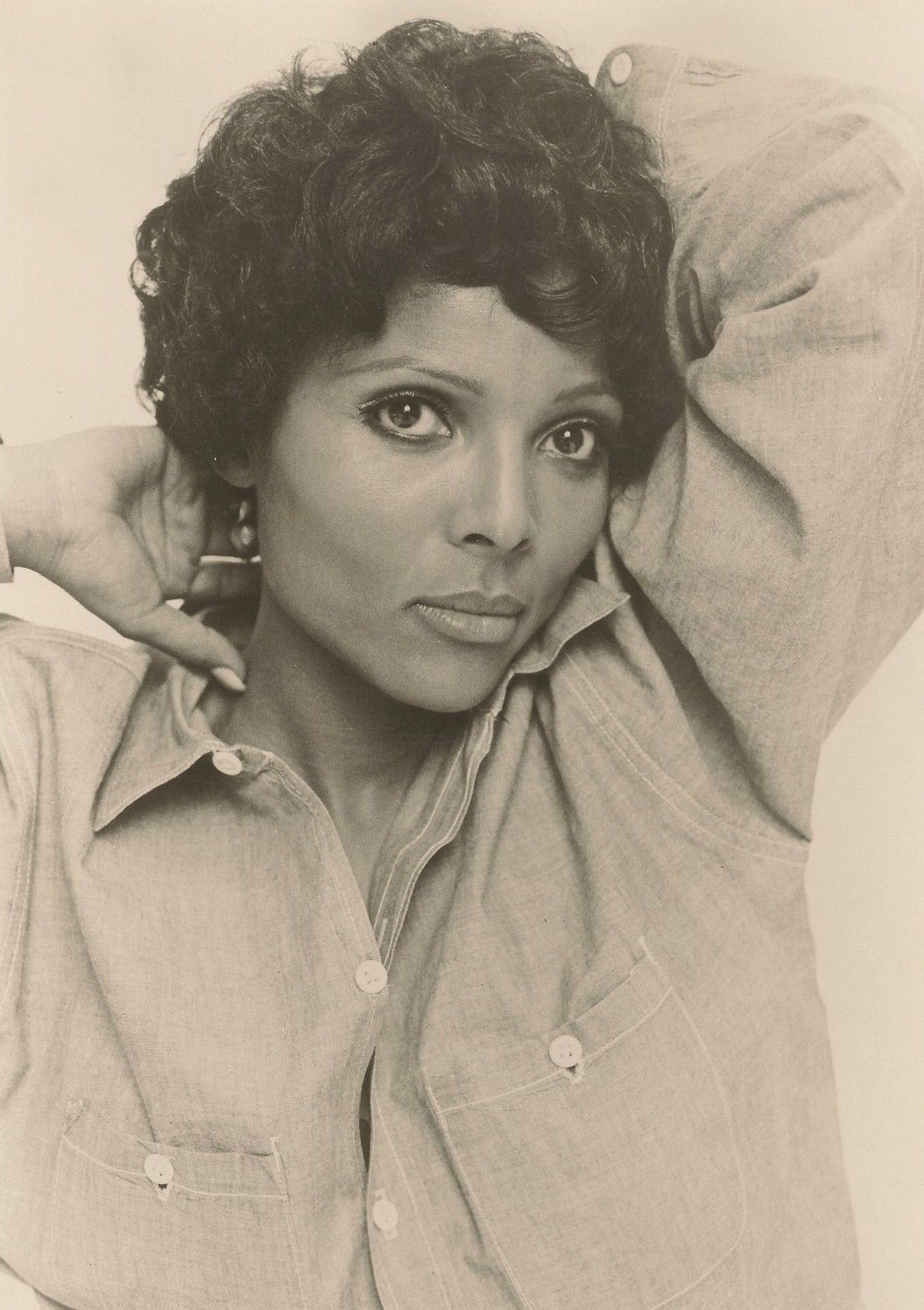
- Hamilton in an undated publicity photo
- Born: Dorothy Mae Aiken; September 12, 1932; Los Angeles, California, United States
- Died: September 16, 2013 (aged 81); Los Angeles, California, United States
- Other name: Kim Rousseau
- Occupation: Actress
- Years active: 1952–2010
- Spouse(s): Robert Henry Hamilton (1951-1969); Werner Klemperer (1997–2000; his death)
- Children: 2

Kim Hamilton (born Dorothy Mae Aiken; September 12, 1932 – September 16, 2013) was an American film and television actress, as well as a director, writer, and artist. Her career spanned more than half a century, from the early 1950s to 2010. Hamilton's early film credits included the 1959 film noir Odds Against Tomorrow opposite Harry Belafonte and The Leech Woman in 1960. She was also one of the first African-American actors to appear on the soap opera Days of Our Lives and was the only African-American to appear in a speaking role on Leave It to Beaver.

Hamilton portrayed, in an uncredited role, Helen Robinson in the 1962 film adaptation of To Kill a Mockingbird, based on Harper Lee's novel of the same name. She was the film's last surviving African-American adult cast member with a speaking role.

== Early life and career ==
Hamilton was born in Los Angeles, California and, as a young woman, initially wanted to work as a model. However, she said she could not find work in the fashion industry, owing to her short stature and race. Instead, prompted by an advertisement in the Los Angeles Times, she enrolled in acting classes and enlisted the services of an agent. Hamilton made her professional acting debut in the 1950s television sitcom Amos 'n' Andy, playing the girlfriend of Andy (Spencer Williams) in several episodes.

She briefly moved to London to pursue acting there. Hamilton was able to find some roles but returned to the United States after the British Actors' Equity Association and the Secretary of State for Employment denied her a work permit, a practice commonly used against American actors at the time.

Hamilton appeared in more than 60 television series and television films throughout her career. In 1960, she guest-starred in an episode of The Twilight Zone titled "The Big Tall Wish." In 1963 and 1964, she played a high-school librarian on two episodes of the popular series My Three Sons. She was also one of the first black actresses to appear on the soap opera Days of Our Lives. She made numerous guest appearances on popular television shows, including Adam-12, The Thin Man, General Hospital, Sanford and Son, Good Times, The Jeffersons, In the Heat of the Night, All In The Family, and Law & Order. She portrayed Songi in "Final Mission," a 1990 episode of Star Trek: The Next Generation. Her last television credit was a 2008 episode of the ABC series Private Practice.

Hamilton was also an artist, director, and writer. In her final works, she was credited as Kim Rousseau.

In December 2007, Hamilton was honored for her career achievements by Columbia University and the Harlem community at an event held at the Museum of the City of New York. Hamilton's honor was part of series of Columbia University's Big Read program, which focused on To Kill a Mockingbird through guest lectures, productions, and panel discussions.

== Personal life and death ==
Kim Hamilton was married twice. Her first marriage, at age 18, was to Robert Henry Hamilton in 1951. They had two children and divorced ten years later. Her son Robert predeceased her.. She then dated German-born actor Werner Klemperer for more than two decades before they married in 1997. They remained together until Klemperer's death on December 6, 2000.

In her later years, Hamilton divided her time between her home in Manhattan and her other residence in her hometown of Los Angeles. In 2013, four days after her 81st birthday, she died of undisclosed causes while in Los Angeles.

== Filmography ==
=== Films ===
Year	Title	Role	Notes
1957	Something of Value	Kipi's Wife	Uncredited
1959	Odds Against Tomorrow	Ruth Ingram	
1960	The Leech Woman	Young Malla	
1961	The Wizard of Baghdad	Teegra, Yasmin's Servant	Uncredited
1962	A Public Affair	Mrs. Hendrickson	
1962	To Kill a Mockingbird	Helen Robinson, Tom's Wife	Uncredited
1966	The Wild Angels	Nurse	
1971	Kotch	Emma Daly	
1973	Heavy Traffic		Voice
1981	Body and Soul	Mrs. Johnson	

=== Television ===
Year	Title	Role	Notes
1955	Damon Runyon Theater		Season 1 Episode 5: "Numbers and Figures"
1955	The Amos 'n Andy Show	Charmaine	Season 4 Episode 8: "Kingfish Teaches Andy to Fly"
1957	General Electric Theater	Miranda	Season 6 Episode 1: "The Questioning Note"
1958	The Thin Man	Emmeline	Season 1 Episode 37: "The Screaming Doll"
1960	The Twilight Zone	Frances	Season 1 Episode 27: "The Big Tall Wish"
1961	Whiplash	Martin Watling	Season 1 Episode 15: "The Remittance Man"
1961	87th Precinct	First Sunbather	Season 1 Episode 1: "The Floater"
1962	The New Breed	Sally Wick	2 episodes
1962	Checkmate	Miss Williams (Mrs. in credits)	Season 2 Episode 24: "Trial by Midnight"
1962	Alfred Hitchcock Presents	The Maid	Season 7 Episode 36: "First Class Honeymoon"
1962	Stoney Burke	Beth Ann Sutter	Season 1 Episode 5: "The Mob Riders"
1962–1963	Ben Casey	Dorothy Garrison / Jane Demarest	2 episodes
1963	77 Sunset Strip	Letha	Season 6 Episode 6: "White Lie"
1963	Leave it to Beaver	The Maid	Season 6 Episode 17: "The Parking Attendants"
1963–1964	My Three Sons	Librarian	2 episodes
1965	Dr. Kildare	Nurse Hammond	Season 5 Episode 1: "Behold the Great Man"
1966	Daniel Boone	Naomi	Season 3 Episode 8: "Onatha"
1967	Me and Benjy	Vivian	TV Movie
1967	Insight	Barbara Walton / Diane	2 episodes
1967–1974	Mannix	Alice Bradley / Hallie Woods / Diana Lee	3 episodes
1968	General Hospital	Dr. Tracy Adams	Episode 1412: "Episode #1.1412"
1968–1982	Days of Our Lives	Nurse West / Miss Jenkins / Nurse Leona / Penelope Wade	7 episodes
1969–1972	The Mod Squad	Delores Sutton / Mildred Jameson	2 episodes
1971	Here's Lucy	Jane the Office Manager	Season 4 Episode 1: "Lucy and Flip Go Legit"
1971	The Man and the City		Season 1 Episode 10: "Run for Daylight"
1972–1975	Sanford and Son	Carol Davis / Grace	2 episodes
1973	Police Story	Harriet Parsons	Season 1 Episode 0: "Slow Boy"
1973	Adam-12	Mrs. Hardy / Mrs. Anderson	2 episodes
1973–1974	The Rookies	Duty Nurse / Irene	2 episodes
1974	Shaft	Marcia Tyler	Season 1 Episode 5: "Shaft and the Cop Killer"
1974	Kojak	Sergeant Donna Mill	Season 2 Episode 3: "Hush Now, Don't You Die"
1974	All in the Family	Mrs. Helen Willis	Season 4 Episode 20: "Lionel's Engagement"
1974	Chopper One	Nurse	Season 1 Episode 10: "Deadly Carrier"
1974	Mooch	Nurse	TV Movie
1974	That's My Mama	Melvina	Season 1 Episode 5: "Clifton's Sugar Mama"
1975	Emergency!	Estelle Lee Dickens	Season 5 Episode 2: "The Old Engine Cram"
1975	Good Times	Betty Edwards	Season 3 Episode 5: "Florida's Rich Cousin"
1975	Marcus Welby, M.D.	Elsbeth Byars / Velma Stokes	2 episodes
1975	Bronk	Hannah	Season 1 Episode 12: "Deception"
1977	Future Cop	June Bundy	Season 1 Episode 4: "Carlisle Girl"
1977	The Fat Albert Christmas Special	Marge Franklin / Nurse (voice)	TV Movie
1978	Project U.F.O.	Diane Armstrong	Season 1 Episode 3: "Sighting 4003: The Fremont Incident"
1978	Doctors' Private Lives	Kitty	TV Movie
1978	A Family Upside Down	Paula	TV Movie
1978	Lady of the House	Mary	TV Movie
1978	Vega$	Ernie	Season 1 Episode 9: "Lost Women"
1978–1979	Tarzan and the Super 7	Microwoman / Christy Cross / Mother Plant (voice)	33 episodes
1979	Stone	Carla Brown	TV Movie
1979	Stone	Carla Brown	Season 1 Episode 0: "Pilot"
1979	The White Shadow	Carol Simpson	Season 2 Episode 5: "A Silent Cheer"
1980	Quincy M.E.	Mrs. Hester	Season 5 Episode 19: "T.K.O."
1981	Sanford	Admitting Clerk	Season 2 Episode 3: "Fred Has the Big One"
1981	Buck Rogers in the 25th Century	Nurse Paulton	Season 2 Episode 4: "Mark of the Saurian"
1983	The Jeffersons	Pauline	Season 9 Episode 14: "My Maid... My Wife"
1983	ABC Weekend Special	Mrs. Stowe	Season 6 Episode 4: "All the Money in the World"
1983–1984	Matt Houston	Judge / Nathaniel's Mother	2 episodes
1984	St. Elsewhere	Judge Dr. Linda Purcell	Season 2 Episode 12: "Hearing"
1984	Paper Dolls	Eleanor	4 episodes
1984	Guiding Light	Victoria Tamerlaine Spaulding	Episode dated December 3
1984	Riptide	Mrs. Collins	Season 2 Episode 8: "It's a Vial Sort of Business"
1985	Gimme a Break!	Della	Season 4 Episode 18: "Alabamy Bound: Part 2"
1985	Alice	Mrs. Reynolds	Season 9 Episode 15: "Vera's Grounded Gumshoe"
1986	Simon & Simon	Nurse Elsa Jelkes	Season 6 Episode 12: "Tonsillitis"
1987	Designing Women	Annabelle	Season 2 Episode 3: "Anthony Jr."
1990	Star Trek: The Next Generation	Songi	Season 4 Episode 9: "Final Mission"
1991–1994	In the Heat of the Night	Mrs. Johnson / Ellen Shore	2 episodes
1992–1996	Law & Order	Judge Vivian Jackson / Marcella Klein	2 episodes
1993	Trade Winds	Madame DeGaulle	Miniseries; 3 episodes
1996	The Client	Rosine Chalmers	Season 1 Episode 20: "Past Imperfect"
2002	Girlfriends	Mother Dent (voice)	Season 2 Episode 14: "Willie or Won't He II: The Last Chapter?"
2002	The Practice	Supreme Court Justice	Season 7 Episode 2: "Convictions"
2008	Private Practice	Frances	Season 2 Episode 6: "Serving Two Masters"
