= The Spook Who Sat by the Door (film) =

1973 film by Ivan Dixon

- 1973 movie poster
- Directed by: Ivan Dixon
- Written by: Melvin Clay; Sam Greenlee
- Based on: The Spook Who Sat by the Door by Sam Greenlee
- Produced by: Ivan Dixon; Sam Greenlee
- Starring: Lawrence Cook; Paula Kelly; Janet League; J. A. Preston; David Lemieux
- Cinematography: Michel Hugo
- Music by: Herbie Hancock
- Distributed by: United Artists
- Release date: September 21, 1973
- Running time: 102 minutes
- Country: United States
- Language: English

The Spook Who Sat by the Door is a 1973 action crime–drama film based on the 1969 novel of the same name by Sam Greenlee. It is both a satire of the civil rights struggle in the United States of the late 1960s and a serious attempt to focus on the issue of Black militancy. Dan Freeman, the titular protagonist, is enlisted by the Central Intelligence Agency (CIA) in its elite espionage program, becoming its token Black person. After mastering agency tactics, however, he becomes disillusioned and drops out to train young Black people in Chicago to become "Freedom Fighters". As a story of one man's reaction to white ruling-class hypocrisy, the film is loosely autobiographical and personal.

The novel and the film also dramatize the CIA's history of giving training to persons and/or groups who later utilize their specialized intelligence training against the agency – an example of "blowback."

Directed by Ivan Dixon, co-produced by Dixon and author Greenlee, from a screenplay written by Greenlee with Mel Clay (a former member of The Living Theatre), the film starred Lawrence Cook, Paula Kelly, Janet League, J. A. Preston, and David Lemieux. It was mostly shot in Gary, Indiana, because the themes of racial strife did not please Chicago's then-mayor Richard J. Daley. The film's soundtrack was an original score composed by Herbie Hancock, who grew up in the same neighborhood as author Sam Greenlee.

In 2012, the film was selected for preservation in the National Film Registry, which annually chooses 25 films that are "culturally, historically or aesthetically significant".

== Plot ==
The story takes place in the early 1970s in Chicago. A white U.S. Senator facing re-election is told that his speech on law and order has led to a decline in his popularity among his African-American constituents. To regain their support, his wife suggests that as a publicity stunt, he point out the lack of African-American agents in the CIA. The CIA responds to this political pressure by recruiting African Americans for their training program. Secretly, however, they take several measures to ensure that no one would be able to complete the process.

Only one candidate, Dan Freeman (Lawrence Cook), covertly a Black nationalist, successfully completes the training process. Freeman becomes the first Black man in the agency and is given a desk job as Top Secret Reproduction Center Sections Chief (which means he is in charge of the photocopier). Freeman is called out of the basement copy center to give tours to visiting Senators so the CIA can appear diverse. Freeman understands that he is the token Black person in the CIA, and that the CIA defines his function as providing proof of the agency's supposed commitment to integration and progress. After completing his training in the CIA's guerrilla warfare techniques, weaponry, communications and subversion, Freeman puts in just enough time to avoid raising any suspicions about his motives, before he resigns from the CIA and returns to work in the social services in Chicago.

Upon his return, Freeman immediately begins recruiting young African Americans living in inner-city Chicago to become "Freedom Fighters", teaching them all the tactics that he had learned from the CIA. They become a guerrilla group, with Freeman as the secret leader. The "Freedom Fighters" set out to ensure that Black people truly live freely within the United States by partaking in both violent and non-violent actions throughout Chicago. The Freedom Fighters of Chicago begin spreading the word about their guerrilla warfare tactics across the United States; as Freeman says, "What we got now is a colony, what we want is a new nation." As revolt and a war of liberation continues in inner-city Chicago, the National Guard and the police desperately try to stop the "freedom fighters".

The film provides discussions about black militancy and the violent reactions that took place by White Americans in response to the progress of the Civil Rights Movement.

== Cast ==
- Lawrence Cook as Dan Freeman, an "ideal Black man" who is accepted into the CIA. He learns warfare techniques and returns to Chicago to organize The Cobras, an underground guerrilla organization.
- Janet League as Joy, Freeman’s college love. Joy does not share the same political views as Freeman and leaves him for a man who will keep her more financially stable.
- Paula Kelly as Dahomey Queen, a prostitute whom Freeman meets in a bar and tries to teach African history in order to instill pride. Eventually she becomes a high-end escort and has Freeman's boss from the CIA as her client, and she works with Freeman to infiltrate the government.
- J. A. Preston as Dawson, childhood friend of Freeman and now a Chicago police officer. Eventually Freeman kills Dawson when Dawson discovers his underground identity and tries to arrest him.
- Paul Butler as Dean "Do-Daddy Dean"
- Don Blakely as "Stud" Davis
- David Lemieux as Willie "Pretty Willie", white-passing Cobra member who identifies as Black. Freeman targets him as a leading propagandist.
- Jack Aaron as Carstairs
- Joseph Mascolo as Senator Hennington, running for Senator; losing the Black vote, he decides to blame the CIA for not hiring Negroes, and seeks to integrate the CIA.
- Elaine Aiken as Mrs. Hennington, the Senator's wife
- Beverly Gill as Willa
- Bob Hill as Calhoun
- Martin Golar as Perkins
- Frank E. Ford as Cobra Member
- Maurice Wicks as Cobra Member
- Perry Thomas as Cobra Member
- Clinton Malcome as Cobra Member
- Orlanders Thomas as Cobra Member
- Larry Lawrence as Cobra Member
- Rodney McGrader as Cobra Member
- Tyrone R. Livingston as Cobra Member
- Ramon Livingston as Cobra Member
- James Mitchell as Cobra Member
- Sidney Eden as Instructor II

== Historical context ==
The 1969 novel The Spook Who Sat by the Door, from which the film was adapted, had been much rejected by mainstream publishers on both sides of the Atlantic before the author met Margaret Busby in London in 1968, and her new company Allison & Busby took on the book and launched it the following year to much critical attention. The political atmosphere in the United States during the time of the book's publication was particularly contentious, as civil rights, women’s rights, and gay rights movements became visible in the public sphere. Tim Reid, whose company helped to release Spook on DVD, said to the Los Angeles Times in 2004: "When you look back at the times...Martin Luther King was assassinated, Malcolm X, Bobby Kennedy. Black people were really angry and frustrated; we were tired of seeing our leaders killed. What do we do? Do we have a revolution? There is nothing that comes close to this movie in terms of black radicalism."

Soon after its release, with the facilitation of FBI suppression, as author Sam Greenlee believed, the film was removed from theaters as a result of its politically controversial message. Writing in 1988, film critic Jonathan Rosenbaum said: "Possibly the most radical of the blaxploitation films of the 70s, this movie was an overnight success when released in 1973, then was abruptly taken out of distribution for reasons still not entirely clear. ... one of the great missing (or at least unwritten) chapters in black political filmmaking." Nina Metz wrote in the Chicago Tribune: "For years it was only available on bootleg video. In 2004, the actor Tim Reid tracked down a remaining negative stored in a vault under a different name ('When they want to lose something, they lose it,' Reid told the Tribune at the time) and released it on DVD." In a 2004 feature for NPR, Karen Bates reported that the director of the film, Ivan Dixon, admitted that United Artists would not show the film in a way that would allow its political message to come through when clips were viewed prior to the film’s public release. "Dixon says when United Artists screened the finished product and saw a Panavision version of political Armageddon, they were stunned."

It has been retrospectively suggested that the film "falls under the auspice of Blaxploitation but the political reality with which it dealt, that of Black militancy and anti establishment ideology, is an aspect that most films avoided in fear of commercial alienation and criticism from the white establishment. ...Ivan Dixon’s film seems to be a missing link between the work of Black filmmakers in the 1970s and the confrontational politics of a contemporary Black filmmaker like Spike Lee."

== Critical reception ==
Film critics agree that The Spook Who Sat By the Door is a significant movie in that it presents a highly politically charged vision of black people, and according to PopMatters the film "remains one of the few uncompromised representations of black armed resistance in the United States." In a 2004 review for Philadelphia City Paper, Sam Adams recognizes the importance of Spook's questioning of politics and race in America, despite some technical weaknesses. Writing that "the movie's sly polemicism has arguably aged better than the revolutionary rhetoric that inspired it", in reference to the film's use of stereotypical imagery alongside its revolutionary political message, Adams states: "Hailed as a landmark and denounced as racist, 'The Spook Who Sat by the Door' is, at the very least, still worth arguing over."

Similarly, Vincent Canby's 1973 review of the film for The New York Times notes the film’s use of stereotypes in order to convey the message at the heart of it: "The rage it projects is real, even though the means by which that rage is projected are stereotypes. Black as well as white". Canby also notes the difficulty he had with reviewing the film in that, although it is not technically impressive or innovative, its political and racial significance is not to be underestimated or dismissed. "...'The Spook Who Sat by the Door' is a difficult work to judge coherently. It is such a mixture of passion, humor, hindsight, prophecy, prejudice and reaction that the fact that it's not a very well-made movie, and is seldom convincing as melodrama, is almost beside the point."

According to David Somerset of the British Film Institute (where the film was screened in May 2012 as part of their "African Odysseys" strand): "the major achievement of Spook is its depiction of a spectrum of social roles within the African-American community. It's a vivid picture of the language of race politics whose complexity and inherent contradictions go to the heart of the African-American experience, encouraging the viewer to transcend class and consider their collective plight. Without this critique of individual complicity in oppression, The Spook Who Sat by the Door could be accused of being a rabble-rousing exercise in fuelling blind resentment, but as Freeman tells a fellow gang member, 'This is not about hating white folks… this is about loving freedom enough to fight and die for it.'"

Richard Brody, writing in The New Yorker in 2018, described the film as "a distinctive and accomplished work of art, no mere artifact of the times".

== Title ==
The title of the film refers to a practice in the early days of affirmative action when the first Black person hired by a company or agency would be seated close to the office entrance so that all who came and went could see that the company was racially mixed. The word "spook" in the title has a dual meaning: a racial slur for an African American and a slang term for spy.

This is shown in Spook when Freeman is asked to give a tour to senators. After Freeman takes the senators on their tour, one of the senators stays back and congratulates the General for integrating Freeman into his personal staff. The General tells his second-in-command that making Freeman a part of his personal staff sounds like a good idea. The agent responds by saying: "We can put him out in reception, so all of our visitors can see we're integrated."

Sam Greenlee also claimed another layer of meaning for the sardonic wordplay in his novel's title: "that an armed revolution by Black people haunts White America, and has for centuries."

In 2022, the title and plot were referenced in "The Goof Who Sat By the Door", episode 8 of the comedy-drama television series Atlanta.

== Legacy ==
In 2011, a documentary about the making of the movie entitled Infiltrating Hollywood: The Rise and Fall of the Spook Who Sat By the Door was released, winning the Black Reel Award for Outstanding Independent Documentary in 2012. Directed by Christine Acham and Clifford Ward, Infiltrating Hollywood featured Sam Greenlee and others involved in the making of the film.

In 2012, The Spook Who Sat By the Door was named by the Library of Congress as among the 25 additions of that year to the National Film Registry, which is "a compendium of motion pictures that captures the breadth of American culture, history and social fabric, with the aim of preserving these fragile films for future generations".

The film was shown at the 2020 New York Film Festival, introduced by Ephraim Asili. J. Hoberman wrote in The New York Times that "...the most shocking thing about this unquiet movie is how relevant it remains."

In 2022, The Spook Who Sat By the Door was listed by TIME magazine as one of "6 Black Films That Changed the Course of Cinema".

== See also ==
- List of American films of 1973
- List of blaxploitation films
- The Spook Who Sat by the Door (novel)
- List of hood films
- Tokenism
