= The Spook Who Sat by the Door (novel) =

1969 novel by Sam Greenlee

- Cover of the 1989 Wayne State University Press edition
- Author: Sam Greenlee
- Language: English
- Publisher: London, UK: Allison & Busby (1969); New York: USA: Richard W. Baron Publishing Co. (1969); Detroit: USA: Wayne State University Press (1989)
- Publication date: March 1969; 57 years ago
- Publication place: United States
- Media type: Print
- Pages: 182
- OCLC: 491599651
- Dewey Decimal: 813/.5/4
- LC Class: PZ4.G8146 Sp PS3557.R396
- Followed by: Blues for an African Princess

The Spook Who Sat by the Door (1969), by Sam Greenlee, is the fictional story of Dan Freeman, the first black CIA officer, and of the CIA's history of training persons and political groups who later used their specialised training in gathering intelligence, political subversion, and guerrilla warfare against the CIA. The novel has been characterised as "part thriller, part satire and part social commentary". As described by The New Yorker, the title "alludes to the conspicuous deployment of the agency's one black officer to display its phony integration".

The author, Sam Greenlee, was told by Aubrey Lewis (1935–2001), one of the first black FBI agents recruited to the Bureau in 1962, that The Spook Who Sat by the Door was required reading at the FBI Academy in Quantico, Virginia. Having been much rejected by mainstream publishers, Greenlee's spy novel first was published by Allison & Busby in the UK in March 1969, after the author met Ghanaian-born editor Margaret Busby in London the previous year, and in the US by the Richard W. Baron Publishing Company. It was subsequently translated into several languages, including French, Italian, Dutch, Japanese, Finnish, Swedish, and German.

== Summary ==
The Spook Who Sat by the Door is set in the late 1960s and early 1970s, in the Chicago of Mayor Richard J. Daley. The story begins with Senator Hennington, a white, liberal senator who is facing a tight re-election vote, and so is looking for ways to win the Negro vote. His wife suggests that he accuse the Central Intelligence Agency (CIA) of racial discrimination, because the Agency has no black officers. Consequent to Senator Hennington's investigation, which assured a comfortable re-election, the CIA is required, for political reasons, to recruit Black Americans for training as case officers. Only Dan Freeman, secretly a black nationalist, successfully completes the training; of his recruitment class, he earned the highest grades and best marks for athleticism. Stationed in South Korea during the Korean War (1950–53), Freeman is an expert in hand-to-hand combat, especially judo; and played football at Michigan State University.

Having become the first black man in the Central Intelligence Agency, Freeman is given a desk job – Section Chief of the Top Secret Reproduction Center. He understands that he is the token black man in the CIA, and that the CIA defines his presence as proof of the Agency's commitment to racial integration and social progress. When used as a "model Negro", and tasked to appear and speak at social and official events, Freeman tells the story the audience wishes to hear. He has a distaste for the "snob-ridden", political world of Washington D.C., and especially the city's black middle class. Therefore, after completing his training in guerrilla warfare, weaponry, communications, and subversion, Freeman continues working at the CIA long enough to avoid raising suspicion about his motives for resigning from the CIA; and then returns to Chicago to work providing social services to black people.

On returning to the city, Freeman communicates with the Cobras, a street gang previously immune to appeals from social-service agencies. Immediately, he begins recruiting young black men from the ghettoes of Chicago, the "inner-city", to become Freedom fighters, by teaching them the guerrilla warfare skills and tactics he learned with the CIA. The Cobras' training includes a fight with the Comanches, a rival street gang; the study and appreciation of black poetry, music, and revolutionary leaders; a bank robbery on 115th and Halstead streets; and the robbery of a National Guard Armory on Cottage Grove Avenue. The Cobras have become a guerrilla group, with Dan Freeman as the secret leader, and, by means of violent and non-violent actions, set out to ensure that black people truly live freely in Chicago and the US. The "Freedom Fighters" of Chicago begin propaganda operations to tell the public about their guerrilla warfare throughout the US. To his guerrillas, Freeman says: "What we got now is a colony, what we want is a new nation." As armed revolt and war of liberation occur throughout the poor neighborhoods of Chicago, the Illinois National Guard and the Chicago police desperately try to stop the black Freedom Fighters.

Learning the operational and tactical flaws of the National Guard's "sloppily trained and ill-disciplined" units, Freeman and the Freedom Fighters escalate their urban warfare in Chicago. First, they blow up the office of the mayor in the new City Hall building. Secondly, they paint a Negro alderman's car yellow and white. Thirdly, they take over radio stations and broadcast propaganda from "the Freedom Fighters, the Urban Underground of Black Chicago." Fourthly, they kidnap Colonel "Bull" Evans, the commander of the Illinois National Guard unit, drug him with LSD, and then release him.

After the Freedom Fighters start sniper attacks, killing National Guardsmen, Dan Freeman is visited by three old friends, two women and a man. After speaking with his female friends, Freeman's final guest is Dawson, a friend and also a Chicago police sergeant. Suspicious of Freeman, Sergeant Dawson had secretly entered Freeman's apartment; his suspicion was verified when he found Freedom Fighter propaganda. After an argument, Freeman attacks Dawson and kills him. He then calls the ranking Freedom Fighters to dispose of Dawson's body. The story closes with Freeman ordering "Condition Red", which order activates guerrilla attack-teams in 12 cities throughout the USA.

== Title and background ==
While using wordplay, the title of the novel, The Spook Who Sat by the Door, refers to a public-relations practice, in the early days of racial affirmative action in US society, whereby the first Black person hired by a company would be placed in an office that was close to and visible from the entrance of the business, so that everyone who entered could see that the company had a racially mixed staff of employees. The word spook has a dual meaning: (i) as a racial slur for a Black person, and (ii) as an intelligence-agency jargon word for a spy. The author also claimed a third layer of meaning for the novel's title: "that an armed revolution by Black people haunts White America, and has for centuries."

"My experiences were identical to those of Freeman in the CIA," Greenlee, a former US Army officer and United States Information Agency officer told The Washington Post in 1973. "Everything in that book is an actual quote. If it wasn't said to me, I overheard it."

The Spook Who Sat by the Door is a critical reflection upon the racism, violence, and oppression lived by African Americans in the United States. As such, the novel is a manual on how to be a successful revolutionary, by beating The System at their own game. The character of "Dan Freeman" demonstrates the importance of co-operation among oppressed peoples in fighting for equality and freedom. About the publication of the novel and the release of the film The Spook Who Sat by the Door (1973), directed by Ivan Dixon, Greenlee said:

"One of the things I was saying with that book is that gangs could become the protectors of the community rather than predators" and that "the purpose of the film was to encourage blacks to create an action plan to 'survive in the belly of the beast', rather than always reacting as victims of a racist society."

Close collaboration between film director Ivan Dixon and screenplay writer Sam Greenlee realised a cinematic representation that did not lose or lessen the strong social analyses and encouragement to revolution in the novel.

In 2022, the novel's title and plot were referenced in "The Goof Who Sat By the Door", episode 8 of the comedy-drama television series Atlanta.

== Historical context ==
The political atmosphere of the United States was especially restless in 1969, the year of publication of The Spook Who Sat by the Door, because the contentious politics for civil rights, for women's rights, and for gay rights movements had become visible in the public sphere. Sociologically, it is suggested that the Symbionese Liberation Army (SLA) – whose symbol was a seven-headed cobra – were influenced in their choice of name by Greenlee's use, in the novel, of the word symbiology, a term derived from the biological term symbiosis, which describes disparate organisms living together in a mutually beneficial relationship.

The original UK book-jacket for The Spook Who Sat by the Door carried endorsements by the political activist Dick Gregory, who called the novel "an important, original, nitty-gritty book"; by the novelist Len Deighton, who said that the book would "cause many readers great annoyance – and, what more can a writer ask, than that?"; and by the writer Stephen Vizinczey, who said the story is "in the manner of the best thrillers, the hero's life is always in danger, and there are women about who undress with passion, but might give him away. Still, there is more at stake than the hero's life or the reader's entertainment – this first-class thriller is also a genuine novel, which is not only exciting, but moving, as it unfolds the black man's dream, the white man's nightmare."

In Britain the novel's publication by Allison and Busby – the new company's first work of fiction – received much critical attention, including extracts being printed in The Observer magazine; Sam Greenlee later noted: "In contrast to more than one hundred reviews in Britain, most of them favourable, my novel was all but ignored by the American literary establishment."

Described as "the first black nationalist novel", The Spook Who Sat by the Door is also regarded as having inspired the "Blaxploitation" genre of films in the 1970s.

== Adaptations ==
The book was adapted into the 1973 film of the same name, which was directed by Ivan Dixon from a screenplay co-written by Greenlee with Melvin Clay.

In August 2018, it was announced that Lee Daniels Entertainment had secured an option on The Spook Who Sat by the Door to develop it as the basis of a series with Fox 21 Television Studios. Leigh Dana Jackson was named in 2019 as the writer adapting the work for television. A pilot was ordered by FX in February 2021.

On April 14, 2021, actress Christina Jackson was reported to be cast in a leading role for the FX pilot of The Spook Who Sat by the Door. She will play Joy Freeman, wife of Dan Freeman (portrayed by series lead Y'lan Noel), described as an up-and-coming attorney committed to making a difference in her community.

In February 2022, it was reported that the pilot would not be moving forward but FX would redevelop the project.

== Controversy ==
J.M. Berger of the International Centre for Counter-Terrorism writes that although the novel contains what Berger perceives as racist language against whites, "the book tends to get a pass on racism", and that "[w]hites in The Spook Who Sat by the Door are either overt racists or barely covert racists, without exception. No exchange between Freeman and a white character takes place without an expression of hostility and a critical racial commentary, sometimes nuanced, sometimes less so." The book may be considered extremist in nature, as Greenlee stated that "[i]t's a training manual for guerrilla warfare". Unlike other works he considers extremist, however, Berger notes: "Its racial grievances are ... mostly grounded in the real, contemporary world of its author".

== Editions ==
- Greenlee, Sam. The Spook Who Sat by the Door (first edition London: Allison & Busby, March 1969; first US edition Richard W. Baron Publishing Co., 1969). Detroit: Wayne State University Press, 1989; new edition with Introduction by Natiki Hope Pressley, June 2022, ISBN 978-0814349571.
  - New UK edition with Introduction by Margaret Busby and Afterword by Natiki Hope Pressley, September 2024, London: Jacaranda Books

== See also ==
- The Turner Diaries
