= I Am the Night—Color Me Black =

- The Twilight Zone episode
- Episode no.: Season 5 Episode 26
- Directed by: Abner Biberman
- Written by: Rod Serling
- Production code: 2630
- Original air date: March 27, 1964

Guest appearances
- Michael Constantine – Sheriff Koch; Paul Fix – Mr. Colby; George Lindsey – Deputy Pierce; Ivan Dixon – Reverend Anderson; Terry Becker – Jagger; Eve McVeagh – Ella

Episode chronology
← Previous "The Masks"	Next → "Sounds and Silences"
- The Twilight Zone (1959 TV series) (season 5)

"I Am the Night—Color Me Black" is episode 146 of the American television anthology series The Twilight Zone. It originally aired on March 27, 1964 on CBS.

== Opening narration ==
Sheriff Charlie Koch on the morning of an execution. As a matter of fact, it's seven-thirty in the morning. Logic and natural laws dictate that at this hour there should be daylight. It is a simple rule of physical science that the sun should rise at a certain moment and supersede the darkness. But at this given moment, Sheriff Charlie Koch, a deputy named Pierce, a condemned man named Jagger, and a small, inconsequential village will shortly find out that there are causes and effects that have no precedent. Such is usually the case—in the Twilight Zone.

== Plot ==
Sheriff Koch cannot sleep the night before the execution of a man, as he feels conflicted about the situation. His wife Ella is no comfort as she snarls, "What time do they string him up; you know what I mean...what time does he get hung?" Her attitude represents the hateful sentiment of the town that looks forward to the fate of Jagger, a man who is to be hanged after being wrongfully convicted of killing a bigot; he claims self defense, and is unrepentant about the killing. On the day of his execution, the sun does not rise in the morning, and it seems that this is the only place in the world where this is true.

There is still some dispute as to whether Jagger is guilty. The sheriff is conflicted, while the deputy is convinced Jagger is guilty; the latter is accused of perjury by the town news reporter. That morning the deputy becomes loud and obnoxious, and the sheriff tells him: "You better unravel it Pierce, or I'll spread you all over this yard". At 9:00 AM, just before the hanging, it is still dark; the radio now reporting the darkness confined to this one small village. The sheriff admits he feels guilty because he didn't question the lack of autopsy of the victim, and didn't care that there were powder burns on the victim despite the deputy testifying that Jagger shot the victim from across a room. The sheriff wanted to be re-elected, and thus went along with the prevailing opinion.

Nonetheless, Jagger is hanged at 9:30, much to the delight of the town. The town clergyman, though of a different faith and race than Jagger, steps in and says that he is thankful to Jagger for having stood up for him and his kind. The clergyman asks if Jagger had felt hate and enjoyment when he killed the man. Jagger confirms that he did. After this, the clergyman also reluctantly agrees to the execution, proclaiming that Jagger was in fact guilty. Jagger is disheartened, saying “It’s important to get with the majority isn’t it? That’s a big thing nowadays isn’t it, Reverend?” The Reverend replies: "That’s all there is, is the majority. The minority must have died on the cross 2,000 years ago". After the hanging, the deputy says that for having gone along with the execution, the clergyman has "seen the light". The clergyman replies that the sky is black because of all the hatred in the world, namely the hatred surrounding Jagger's execution. The sky becomes even darker after the execution. The deputy is convinced that the darkness is nothing more than fog, which will eventually lift, but neither the sheriff nor the reporter is convinced.

Later, a radio broadcast reveals that the town is not the only place where this disturbance is happening. The sky has turned dark over North Vietnam; a section of the Berlin Wall; areas of Shanghai and Birmingham, AL; a political prison in Budapest; a section of Dallas (where President Kennedy was fatally shot), and other places around the world where hatred runs rampant.

== Closing narration ==
A sickness known as hate. Not a virus, not a microbe, not a germ—but a sickness nonetheless, highly contagious, deadly in its effects. Don't look for it in the Twilight Zone—look for it in a mirror. Look for it before the light goes out altogether.

== Cast ==
- Michael Constantine as Sheriff Charlie Koch
- Paul Fix as Colbey
- George Lindsey as Deputy Pierce
- Ivan Dixon as the Reverend Anderson
- Terry Becker as Jagger
- Eve McVeagh as Ella
- Douglas Bank as Man
- Russell Custer as Townsman
- Elizabeth Harrower as Woman
- Michael Jeffers as Deputy
- Robert McCord as Townsman
- Ward Wood as Man

== Production notes ==
Serling wrote this script primarily as his personal reaction to the assassination of President John F. Kennedy on November 22, 1963. Indeed, mention is made in the story of "a street in Dallas, Texas" (where Kennedy was murdered as his motorcade traveled down Elm Street in Dallas' Dealey Plaza) as being enveloped by the strange darkness.

The episode is similar to "Many, Many Monkeys", a script written for Twilight Zone by its producer, William Froug, but never shot. In that script an epidemic breaks out in which afflicted persons' eyes seal shut as folds of flesh grow over them. Though a nuclear explosion is initially blamed, one character proposes that it is a physical manifestation of hate that is blinding them. The network bought the script but then shelved it, finding its subject matter too disturbing, but it was eventually produced in 1989, during the first revival of Twilight Zone.

Years earlier, Serling had written a teleplay for Playhouse 90 called "A Town Has Turned to Dust", about the 1870 lynching of an innocent Mexican man in a Southwestern town. This story was based on the Emmett Till case, and Serling had to deal with executive interference and network censors before the episode could air.

== Sources ==
- DeVoe, Bill. (2008). Trivia from The Twilight Zone. Albany, GA: Bear Manor Media. ISBN 978-1-59393-136-0
- Grams, Martin. (2008). The Twilight Zone: Unlocking the Door to a Television Classic. Churchville, MD: OTR Publishing. ISBN 978-0-9703310-9-0
- Zicree, Marc Scott: The Twilight Zone Companion. Sillman-James Press, 1982 (second edition)
