= Wayne State University Press =

Academic publisher

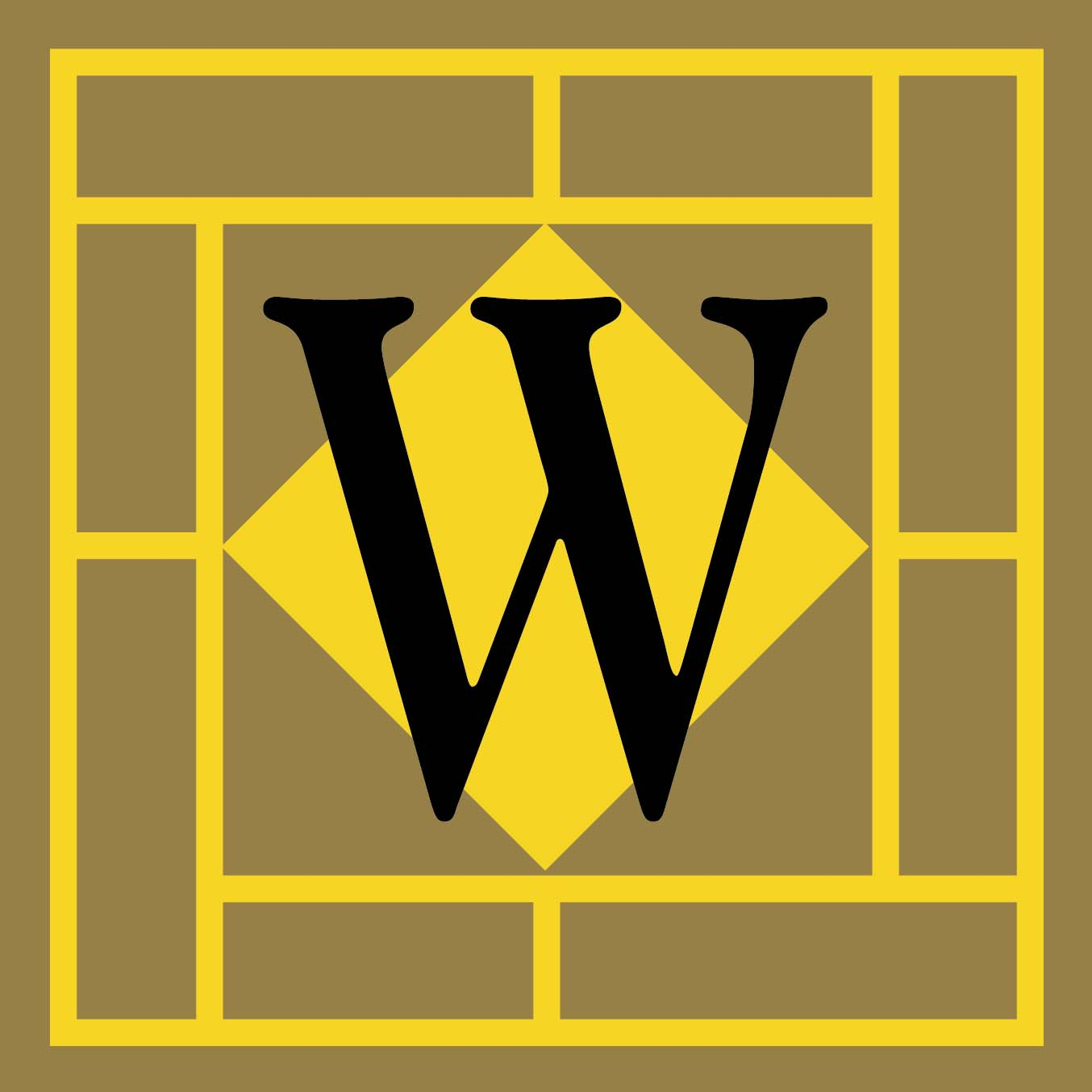
- Parent company: Wayne State University
- Founded: 1941
- Country of origin: United States
- Headquarters location: Detroit, Michigan
- Distribution: self-distributed (US); Scholarly Book Services (Canada); Eurospan Group (EMEA); East-West Export Books (Asia and the Pacific)
- Publication types: books, journals
- Imprints: Painted Turtle and Great Lakes Books
- Official website: wsupress.wayne.edu

Wayne State University Press (or WSU Press) is a university press that is part of Wayne State University. It publishes under its own name and also the imprints Painted Turtle and Great Lakes Books Series.

== History ==
The Press has strong subject areas in Africana studies; fairy-tale and folklore studies; film, television, and media studies; Jewish studies; regional interest; and speech and language pathology. Wayne State University Press also publishes eleven academic journals, including Marvels & Tales, and several trade publications, as well as the Made in Michigan Writers Series.

WSU Press is located in the Leonard N. Simons Building on Wayne State University's main campus.

An editorial board approves the Wayne State University Press's titles. The board considers proposals and manuscripts presented by WSU Press's acquisitions department. WSU Press also has a Board of Visitors, dedicated to fundraising and advocacy in support of the Press.

Officially, WSU Press is an auxiliary unit of the university that reports to the president and receives an annual subvention that partially covers the cost of its operation. For the most part, WSU Press relies on revenue generated through the sale of its publications to meet its operating expenses.

The Wayne State University Press was founded in 1941 when faculty members of (then) Wayne University volunteered to establish a publishing entity to "assist the University in the encouragement and dissemination of scholarly learning". An English professor ran the press, then known as Wayne University Press, for years as a side project only. It was not until 1954 that WSU Press developed into a full-fledged publisher.

== Imprints ==
- Painted Turtle
- Great Lakes Books

== See also ==
- List of English-language book publishing companies
- List of university presses
