= Alfred Hitchcock Presents season 6 =

Alfred Hitchcock Presents aired 38 episodes during its sixth season from 1960 to 1961.

== Episodes ==
No. overall	No. in season	Title	Directed by	Written by	Stars	Original release date
192	1	"Mrs. Bixby and the Colonel's Coat"	Alfred Hitchcock	Story by : Roald Dahl; Teleplay by : Halsted Welles	Audrey Meadows as Mrs. Bixby, Les Tremayne as Dr. Fred Bixby	September 27, 1960
Mrs. Bixby visits her husband’s New York City dental office to bring his lunch and announce her monthly visit to her aunt in Baltimore. Her visits are not to her aunt, however, but to her lover, the Colonel. On this trip, Mrs. Bixby finds the Colonel too busy to see her as he rushes away on business. While in the care of his housekeeper, she receives a package from him containing an elegant mink coat and a letter ending their affair. Wanting to keep the coat without arousing her husband’s suspicion, she pawns the coat on returning to New York and gives her husband the ticket, claiming to have found it in a taxi. He goes to exchange the ticket, but returns with a small mink stole. Mrs. Bixby then learns her husband gave the coat to his young, attractive nurse. Supporting Cast: Stephen Chase as Colonel, Maidie Norman as Eloise, Bernie Hamilton as Dawson, Sally Hughes as Miss Putney, Howard Caine as Pawnbroker Employee, Harry Cheshire as Mr. Gorman (uncredited)
193	2	"The Doubtful Doctor"	Arthur Hiller	Story by : Louis Paul; Teleplay by : Jerry Sohl	Dick York as Ralph Jones, Gena Rowlands as Lucille Jones	October 4, 1960
A psychiatrist (Zaremba) talks with his patient Ralph Jones (York) about his last argument with his wife of two years, Lucille (Rowlands), after a stressful day. They argue about drinking, having company, giving family money, and whether to get a new home and have more children. Then Ralph mysteriously travels two years back in time to when he was still a bachelor in December 1958. His landlord Mr. Treadwell (Julian) shows up to angrily demand two months' worth of rent money while Ralph tries to get his bearings. Ralph travels to find Lucille at her job at the soap company, but the circumstances are different than had previously occurred, as the boss is not present and Lucille turns him down. After he follows her and begs her to have lunch, what should have been their first date is a disaster as he tells her their alternate future and she believes him to be delusional. He even tries to get the waiter, Jimmy (Smiley), to confirm his tale, but Jimmy doesn't know him. After Lucille leaves him, Ralph goes to the docks and talks with youngster Sidney (Burns), who sells him his baseball cards. Broken-hearted, Ralph jumps into the river and wakes up back in his regular "present" in the shower. He is infused with positivity and optimism and displays warm intentions to Lucille. Later, Ralph's psychiatrist tells him that the episode, like the one that occurred in his childhood, was just a daydream, but Ralph has a set of wet baseball cards that he brought back from his travel. Supporting Cast: Michael Burns as Sidney, Joseph Julian as Mr. Treadwell, Ralph Smiley as Jimmy the Waiter, John Zaremba as Psychiatrist, Shep Houghton as Restaurant Patron (uncredited), Edwin Rochelle as Waiter (uncredited), Norman Stevans as Restaurant Patron (uncredited), Oliver Cross as Restaurant Patron (uncredited)
194	3	"Very Moral Theft"	Norman Lloyd	Story by : Jack Dillon; Teleplay by : Allan Gordon	Betty Field as Helen, Walter Matthau as Harry Wade	October 11, 1960
Spinster Helen (Field) is dating (and wants to marry) Harry Wade (Matthau), a rude lumber yard owner who relies on employee Carl (Ponti) to help finish jobs. Helen's brother John (Swenson) believes that Harry is a crook. John is about to get married and confronts Helen regarding her future in the house. Helen and Harry go out to their favorite place, where owner Charlie (Gilman) serves them, while Harry tells Helen that he is about to lose his business because he owes the mill $8,000, has not yet been paid for his last job, and cannot borrow from any bank. He tells Helen that he could pay back a loan within forty-eight hours easily, so Helen "borrows" the money from Mr. Ivers' (Lane) $9,000 account payment to her mortgage office in order to help Harry. She slyly takes a cashier's check while talking with Mr. Parker (Fresco) and the bank teller (Carlson). After visiting with Helen's boss Mr. Fescue (Newell), Harry goes to Helen's house for dinner and tells her that he could not get the money but promises to get it by the next day. He pays her back the money by borrowing from his "friends" on the value of his lumber. A week later, Helen goes to Charlie and learns that Harry died to get the money for her. Supporting Cast: William Newell as Mr. Fescue, Rusty Lane as Mr. Ivers, Sam Gilman as Charlie, Karl Swenson as John, David Fresco as Mr. Parker, Sal Ponti as Carl, Charles Carlson as Bank Teller (uncredited)
195	4	"The Contest for Aaron Gold"	Norman Lloyd	Story by : Philip Roth; Teleplay by : William Fay	Barry Gordon as Aaron Gold, Sydney Pollack as Bernie Samuelson, Frank Maxwell as Mr. Lyle Stern	October 18, 1960
The Camp Lakeside staff feels the yoke of the dictatorial owner, Lyle Stern. New hire Bernie Samuelson, an art instructor, takes special interest in camper Aaron Gold, the son of a wealthy businessman. Aaron dislikes athletics but loves sculpture, and begins to blossom under Samuelson’s mentoring. To impress Aaron’s father on visitor’s day, Stern coerces Samuelson to “complete” Aaron’s sculpture of a one-armed knight. He complies, but decides to stand up to Stern when he discovers that the boy’s sculpture represents his father, who lost an arm in Korea. Supporting Cast: John Craven as Herbert Gold, William Thourlby as Lefty James, Phil Phillips as Henry, Buddy Lewis as Angelo, Michael Adam Lloyd as Boy, Robin Warga as Boy
196	5	"The Five-Forty-Eight"	John Brahm	Story by : John Cheever; Teleplay by : Charlotte Armstrong	Phyllis Thaxter as Miss Dent, Zachary Scott as Mr. Blake	October 25, 1960
Miss Dent is a troubled woman, fired from a job she liked after a one night stand with her married boss, Mr. Blake. She doggedly stalks him. He fears a confrontation with her. One day, he sits near two of his neighbors on the commuter train home, but these neighbors ignore him and his subsequent plight—Miss Dent sits next to him and threatens him with a handgun. She describes her devotion to her job and the unfairness of being accused of incompetence. She hands him a letter in which she states her case in detail and reveals a history of mental illness. She tells him she must make him understand so that she can move on. When the train reaches his stop, she forces him to walk along the tracks until they are out of sight of the station. She tells him to lie face down in the dirt and he begins sobbing. She announces she has her closure and walks away, leaving him in the dust. Supporting Cast: Raymond Bailey as Mr. Watkins, Charles Davis as Mr. Johnson, Penny Edwards as Miss Smith, Phil Gordon as Bartender, Irene Windust as Mrs. Compton, Joseph Hamilton as Train Conductor
197	6	"Pen Pal"	John Brahm	Story by : Henry Slesar & Jay Folb; Teleplay by : Hilary Murray	Katherine Squire as Miss Lowen, Clu Gulager as Rod Collins	November 1, 1960
Elderly Miss Lowen (Squire) learns from Detective Berger (Adams) that her niece Margie, who has been living with her for the nine years since her father's death in World War II, has been exchanging romantic letters (through a pen pal club) with 27-year-old convict Rod Collins (Gulager) for the past two years. Collins, facing life in prison for murder, has just escaped prison after nine years and may come to her for help and shelter. Margie is away staying with a friend, so the decision is made to not inform her of the circumstances. Collins breaks into Miss Lowen's house almost immediately after the detective leaves in desperation to find Margie, as he believes himself to be in love with her. Collins believes that he can work a lathe job in a machinist shop to support them while on the run. Miss Lowen promises to call her niece, but she instead calls Detective Berger. Miss Lowen knocks Collins out and the police capture him as a doctor (Montgomery) bandages his head. Unknown to all, Miss Lowen is the one who has been writing to Collins all along, using her niece's name. She immediately starts writing a new letter to Collins. Supporting Cast: Stanley Adams as Detective Berger, Ray Montgomery as Doctor
198	7	"Outlaw in Town"	Herschel Daugherty	Michael Fessier	Ricardo Montalbán as "Tony" Lorca / Pepe Lorca, Constance Ford as Shasta Cooney	November 15, 1960
Tony Lorca, the Whistling Kid, is a Texas outlaw. During a blizzard, he arrives joyfully in a small town where he has many enemies. He makes trouble at the saloon by teasing the patrons about how the weather will affect their farms and livestock. One of the ranchers draws a gun, but a Native American woman intervenes. The men begin a poker game. Another rancher discovers that there is a $5000 bounty on Lorca. The patrons negotiate for pieces of the reward, based on how mightily each has suffered from Lorca in the past. Lorca becomes involved in the negotiations and allows himself to be bought and sold for increasing amounts of money by patrons hoping to get part of the reward or its equivalent. A marshal arrives and tells the patrons that Lorca is an imposter: the real Tony Lorca died a year before, and this man is his brother, Pepe, who has been using his brother's reputation to scam people based on a phony bounty. Meanwhile, Pepe and a patron who kidnapped him at gunpoint have secretly married, and climb the stairs to spend their wedding night. Supporting Cast: Roscoe Ates as Zack Martin, Arch Johnson as Bart McCormick, Patsy Kelly as Minnie Redwing, Bernard Kates as Little Man, Brad Weston as Trig Owens, Addison Richards as Justice of the Peace, Clegg Hoyt as Bar Patron, Ray Weaver as Bar Patron in coonskin hat, Snub Pollard as Bar Patron (uncredited), Shirley Blackwell as Saloon Girl (uncredited) Note: The actors who played Pack Munce and the marshal are uncredited and currently unknown.
199	8	"O Youth and Beauty!"	Norman Lloyd	Story by : John Cheever; Teleplay by : Halsted Welles	Gary Merrill as Cash Bentley, Patricia Breslin as Louise Bentley	November 22, 1960
Cash Bentley is a middle-aged former champion hurdler, bitter that his glory days are behind him. During alcohol-fueled parties at the country club, he uses the furniture as makeshift hurdles and runs races to the delight of the partygoers and the chagrin of his wife, Louise. After one such party, Cash and Louise return home, relieve the babysitter, and Cash drunkenly hurdles the living room furniture, breaking his leg. His doctor tells him he will never run again. Louise narrowly prevents him from attempting another performance at the next country club party, but at home Cash rearranges the furniture, hands Louise a gun and tells her to fire a starting shot. Unfamiliar with guns, Louise accidentally shoots him dead. Supporting Cast: Maurice Manson as Archie, David Lewis as Jim, Dudley Manlove as George, Theodore Newton as Physician, Bert Stevens as Club Member (uncredited), Dick Winslow as Club Member (uncredited), Steve Carruthers as Club Member (uncredited) Note: The actress who played Cathy and the actor who played Eric are both uncredited and currently unknown.
200	9	"The Money"	Alan Crosland, Jr.	Henry Slesar	Robert Loggia as Larry Chetnik, Doris Dowling as Angie, Will Kuluva as Stefan Bregornick	November 29, 1960
Small-time crook Larry (Loggia) and his girlfriend Angie (Dowling) argue about marriage and money after Larry quits as a bookie. Larry sees the secretary (May) of and gets a job with wealthy Stefan Bregornick (Kuluva), cousin to Larry's father but who saw him as naive and stupid for being straight. Bregornick is an importer of many things, including stolen goods. Bregornick introduces Larry to his friend Miklosh (Barzell) and they discuss the importation business, specifically vintage wine. Four months into the job, after constant hassling from Angie and promising her a move to dreamy Rio de Janeiro, Larry stages a phone call pretending to be Miklosh in order to sabotage a deal. Larry takes the $30,000 from Bregornick for the supposed deal and shows it to Angie, but he returns it a few hours later as Miklosh arrives for the actual deal, apologizing for his moment of weakness while invoking his father's honesty. Angie is angered at Larry's giving back the money, but Larry explains that he now has Bregornick's trust, and a better opportunity to steal more money will come his way soon. Supporting Cast: Wolfe Barzell as Miklosh, Monica May as Secretary, Victor Romito as Miklosh's Cousin (uncredited)
201	10	"Sybilla"	Ida Lupino	Story by : Margaret Manners; Teleplay by : Charlotte Armstrong	Barbara Bel Geddes as Sybilla Meade, Alexander Scourby as Horace Meade	December 6, 1960
Horace Meade (Scourby) narrates how he married and lived with his dead wife Sybilla (Bel Geddes) while examining his diary. He flashes back to moving into their new home after getting married, with a warm welcome by housekeepers Mrs. Carter (Kennedy) and Mr. Carter. Sybilla is perfectly obedient and agrees to all his unconventional demands, including his breakfast demands and having separate bedrooms. Horace keeps expecting and desiring to have to rebel against Sybilla's changes, but Sybilla seeks no changes whatsoever, which annoys Horace. Despite her absolute loyalty and obedience, Horace grows uncomfortable with her and tries to poison her with sleep medicine in her evening wine, but he is mysteriously thwarted after Sybilla spills the medicine while cleaning. After Horace notices that Sybilla has a key to Horace's desk (and therefore access to his diary stating his thoughts), he concludes that she knew about the poisoning and has made contingencies with her lawyer (Robinson) in case she dies, and his only choice is to keep her alive and healthy. Sybilla gets sick after eight years of marriage, so they visit the seashore and consult a doctor (Wynn). Finally, after ten years of marriage, Sybilla dies of natural causes. Horace learns that there was no contingency plan (she left everything she had to him), and he realizes that he truly loved her in the end. Supporting Cast: Madge Kennedy as Mrs. Carter, Bartlett Robinson as Lawyer, Gordon Wynn as Doctor
202	11	"The Man with Two Faces"	Stuart Rosenberg	Henry Slesar	Spring Byington as Alice Wagner, Steve Dunne as Lieutenant Meade, Bethel Leslie as Mabel Graves	December 13, 1960
Senior citizens Alice Wagner (Byington) and Mildred (Marden) split up after leaving the bowling alley and Alice is mugged. Alice gets dressed up fancily to go to the police, which her daughter Mabel questions (Leslie) and her son-in-law Leo (McGuire) flatters. While browsing mugshots with police Lieutenant Meade (Dunne), Alice finds a photo of a man named William Graves who looks like her son-in-law Leo. Meanwhile, Mabel and Leo fight over Leo's gambling habits, and Alice questions Mabel about Leo's financial past in California. When Alice sees Lt. Meade again, she is assured by Lt. Meade that the photo resemblance is merely a coincidence. However, when she brings in a photograph of Leo and Mabel to the police, she is shocked to learn both her daughter and son-in-law are revealed to be wanted criminals. Lt. Meade stops by her residence to arrest them and tells her they are wanted for five years-worth of criminal activity in California. Supporting Cast: Harp McGuire as Leo / William Graves, Adrienne Marden as Mildred
203	12	"The Baby-Blue Expression"	Arthur Hiller	Story by : Mary Stolz; Teleplay by : Helen Nielsen	Sarah Marshall as Mrs. Barrett	December 20, 1960
James Barrett (Gaines) busily plans for his absence so that he can go on a business trip to Toronto. He turns affairs over to Philip Weaver (Walker) and calls his wife Mrs. Barrett (Marshall) to cancel lunch. Scatterbrained Mrs. Barrett goes to lunch and conspires with Philip, her lover, to kill James while he is away on the Toronto business trip. Doorman Harry (Weinrib) carries James' bags while housekeeper Helen (Angold) is placed in charge of the household and Mrs. Barrett says goodbye, carrying out the first part of the plan. Mrs. Barrett receives a letter from Philip detailing her instructions to mail a letter to James in Toronto and host a party. However, she mistakenly mails the instruction letter incriminating Philip and her about the murder plan to James while distracted talking to friend Raymond (Stratton). She frantically tries to get it back by chasing after the mail carrier's truck and requesting it from the post office, but she fails as the letter was already mailed. At Helen's advice, she calls the telephone company while party guests (Richards, Carson) begin to arrive, with her friend Lotte (Carr) complaining about her vitamin pills. Mrs. Barrett receives a phone call indicating that James never arrived just as Harry shows up stating that the letter was returned due to insufficient postage; however, he thoughtfully put correct postage on the letter to help her reach her husband. Supporting Cast: Richard Gaines as James Barrett, Peter Walker as Philip Weaver, Lennie Weinrib as Harry, Chet Stratton as Raymond, Edit Angold as Helen, Liz Carr as Lotte, Frank Richards as Party Guest, Charles Carson as Party Guest Note: The actor who played the postal employee is uncredited and currently unknown.
204	13	"The Man Who Found the Money"	Alan Crosland, Jr.	Story by : James E. Cronin; Teleplay by : Allan Gordon	Arthur Hill as William Benson	December 27, 1960
While on holiday in Las Vegas, paleontology Professor William Benson (Hill) stumbles on a money clip containing $92,000 when leaving a casino. He rents a safety deposit box from bank employee Elaine Purdy (Prentis) to store the cash while he considers his options. He then goes to the local newspaper to write a lost-and-found article regarding the money, and the advertising manager, A.J. Meecham (Cooper), advises him to go to the police. At the police station, the desk sergeant (Allen) and Captain Bone (Armstrong) take his report but adamantly claim that the missing amount is actually $102,000, stating that Benson must have gambled the extra money away despite Benson's protestations. Benson states that despite being tempted, he reported it so that it can be returned to its owner, who happens to be casino mogul Mr. Newsome (Cameron). Newsome also claims that the clip is supposed to contain $102,000 and initially comes across as amicable, claiming that the money will be found and offering to let Benson and his wife Joyce stay at his hotel free for a week. At Newsome's hotel, where Benson was previously staying, casino employee Mr. Lent (Barron) treats Benson to drinks and gaming. However, when taken to a back office, Newsome reveals that he has kidnapped Benson's wife in St. Louis, demanding that Benson "return" the missing money. Supporting Cast: R.G. Armstrong as Captain Bone, Rod Cameron as Mr. Newsome, Clancy Cooper as A.J. Meecham, Baynes Barron as Mr. Lent, Lucy Prentis as Elaine Purdy, Mark Allen as Desk Sergeant
205	14	"The Changing Heart"	Robert Florey	Robert Bloch	Nicholas Pryor as Dane Rosse, Anne Helm as Lisa Klemm, Abraham Sofaer as Ulrich Klemm	January 3, 1961
Dane Rosse (Pryor) visits a renowned clockmaker, Ulrich Klemm (Sofaer), to look at his broken pocket watch, a rare family heirloom. Ulrich makes complex clock figurines and repairs delicate pieces, but he had no desire to be a doctor because of the flaws of human bodies. While there, Dane falls in love with Lisa Klemm (Helm), granddaughter of Ulrich, who cooks dinner for them. A little while later, Dane receives a promotion and offers marriage to Lisa. Ulrich is highly protective of Lisa, though, and refuses to let the pair marry, commanding her to stay with an almost hypnotic control. Ulrich even threatens to destroy Lisa rather than let her go. Dane leaves town heartbroken and learns through his friend Jack (Sampson) that Lisa has fallen seriously ill, as Jack visited Ullrich to ask why Lisa had not replied to Dane's letters over the three previous months. When Dane returns and breaks into Ullrich's boarded-up business, he finds Ulrich dead of exhaustion from his work of "saving" Lisa by turning her into a clockwork automaton. Supporting Cast: Robert Sampson as Jack, Baruch Lumet as Concertina Player
206	15	"Summer Shade"	Herschel Daugherty	Story by : Nora H. Caplan; Teleplay by : Harold Swanton	Julie Adams as Phyllis Kendall, James Franciscus as Ben Kendall	January 10, 1961
Phyllis (Adams) and Ben Kendall (Franciscus) are searching for a new home in Salem, Massachusetts with their 9-year-old daughter Katie (Gordon) when Phyllis is drawn to a particular 107-year-old house being sold by elderly Amelia Gastell (Grace). They get a blessing from the reverend (Hoyt) who informs them of Amelia's family history. Not long after they move into the house, Katie claims that she has made a new friend, "Lettie", whom her parents never see. Katie and Lettie constantly play by the creek next to the house, but Lettie is never to be found by Phyllis and Ben. A doctor (Nedd) comes to check on Lettie, as she has a slight fever, but he believes that Katie is making up Lettie. They discover that Lettie's aunt Bridgette was hanged as a witch during the Salem witch trials. Katie even wears a necklace of buzzard bones which she says Lettie gave her to keep away the pox. After visiting the local Puritan graveyard with the reverend, Phyllis suspects that Lettie is Lauretta Bishop, a 9-year-old Puritan girl who died in 1694. When Ben asks Amelia, now their babysitter, to find a new friend for Katie, Amelia brings "Judy Davidson" (Cartwright) to their house, but Judy is actually Lettie, who is also Lauretta Bishop. Supporting Cast: Veronica Cartwright as Judy Davidson / Lettie / Lauretta Bishop, Susan Gordon as Kate 'Katie' Kendall, Charity Grace as Amelia Gastell, John Hoyt as Reverend, Stuart Nedd as Doctor
207	16	"A Crime for Mothers"	Ida Lupino	Henry Slesar	Claire Trevor as Mrs. Meade, Biff Elliot as Phil Ames	January 24, 1961
Jane (P. Smith) and Ralph Birdwell (Sampson) happily discuss buying their daughter Eileen a new doll when Mrs. Meade (Trevor) stops by their home after giving up the rights to her birth-daughter Eileen seven years prior. She states that she wants Eileen back from the Birdwells, who raised Mrs. Meade's abandoned daughter Eileen as their own. She is willing to forget it for $100-150 per week and threatens to hire a lawyer. Meade is visited at her home by private investigator Phil Ames (Elliot), who promises her $25,000 in exchange for twenty percent of the cut. They team up to kidnap Eileen after she leaves school, as he convinces her that she can simply take back her daughter legally. They do a dry run by the school, while Phil tells Meade to take her in a taxicab to her home and hold her until he calls. After the deed is done, Phil comes by with his "partner" Charlie Vance (Calder) and reveals that it turns out to be a trap, as Phil is a friend of the Birdwells and Charlie is a former FBI agent. They threaten Meade with a life in prison for kidnapping the girl, who is not Eileen but actually another girl named Margaret (S. Smith), and who happens to be Phil's child. Supporting Cast: Robert Sampson as Ralph Birdwell, Patricia Smith as Jane Birdwell, King Calder as Charlie Vance, Howard McNear as Mr. Maxwell, Sally Smith as Margaret, Gail Bonney as Secretary
208	17	"The Last Escape"	Paul Henreid	Henry Slesar	Keenan Wynn as Joe Ferlini, Jan Sterling as Wanda Ferlini	January 31, 1961
Joe (Wynn) and Wanda Ferlini (Sterling) are a husband-and-wife escape artist act, though their marital relationship is strained. They argue about age and whether they can still do difficult tricks, and Joe is especially sensitive about being called old. Joe argues with agent Harry Miller (Patrick) about working an especially complex trick involving swimming and handcuffs. Meanwhile, Wanda has a secret relationship with singer Tommy (Craven), who urges her to leave Joe. At an event where Joe finally gets to attempt his dream trick, police Chief Wallace (Carson) is given the honor of placing the handcuffs on Joe, while associate Dave Brooks (Rondell) drives the boat to dump Joe into the lake. When Joe performs the dangerous water escape while handcuffed, Wanda switches his keys, causing him to drown. At the funeral, while the reverend (Meredith) gives his sermon, an insurance investigator (Stroud) interrupts and opens the coffin, revealing to the public that it is empty. Harry reveals that he privately arranged that Joe be buried somewhere secret as a final "escape", but due to the stunt, Wanda goes insane and is placed under the care of a psychiatrist (Livesey). Supporting Cast: Dennis Patrick as Harry Miller, John Craven as Tommy, Bob Carson (credited as Robert Carson) as Police Chief Wallace, Ronnie Rondell Jr. (credited as Ronnie R. Rondell) as Dave Brooks, Charles Meredith as Reverend, Jack Livesey as Psychiatrist, Claude Stroud as Investigator
209	18	"The Greatest Monster of Them All"	Robert Stevens	Story by : Bryce Walton; Teleplay by : Robert Bloch	William Redfield as Fred Logan, Richard Hale as Ernst von Croft, Sam Jaffe as Hal Ballew, Robert H. Harris as Morty Lenton	February 14, 1961
Writer Hal Bellew (Jaffe) peruses a book on entomology looking for his next movie monster while director Morty Lenton (Harris) attempts to write his soundtrack. Screenwriter Fred Logan (Redfield), tasked with finding a new monster bug, asks Morty to cast veteran horror actor Ernst von Croft (Hale) in their latest film in a comeback role. Bellew convinces von Croft to join the cast and return to greatness. Bellew sends Fred to watch the film with audiences and take notes for a sequel. Although Fred and von Croft believe that it is a regular low-budget horror film, Morty has reworked it as a horror parody with blonde bombshell Lara Lee (Welles) and cartoonish voices, which embarrasses von Croft. Fred gets drunk and visits a depressed and angry von Croft to convince him that he was "the greatest monster of them all" and to forget about it, but to no avail. In revenge, von Croft dresses as a vampire and kills Morty before committing suicide by leaping to his death. Supporting Cast: Meri Welles as Lara Lee, Baruch Lumet as Man on Stairs, Charles Carlson as Office Boy, Phil Adams as Movie Audience Member, Joan Marcus as Movie Audience Member, Mike Taylor as Movie Audience Member, Ronnie Sorenson as Movie Audience Member, Eve Lesley as Movie Audience Member, Shirley Blackwell as Harem Girl (uncredited)
210	19	"The Landlady"	Paul Henreid	Story by : Roald Dahl; Teleplay by : Robert Bloch	Dean Stockwell as Billy Weaver, Patricia Collinge as the Landlady	February 21, 1961
England. Bartender Wilkins (Main) and customers Tom (Harvey) and Bert (Pelling) talk about crimes occurring in their provincial town while an old man (Mustin) plays darts. When Billy Weaver (Stockwell) arrives, waitress Rosie (Livesey) serves him food and drink while Weaver helps Wilkins open his stuck cash register. Weaver leaves and soon finds accommodations in the house of a friendly landlady (Collinge). The landlady keeps referring to two other tenants (Christopher Mulholland and Gregory Temple) on the third floor, but Weaver never sees them and can only place their names with "something unpleasant", and after some time, remembering that one of them was a missing person. Weaver investigates their rooms but finds no evidence that anyone has stayed there recently. One rainy day, Weaver drinks a cup of tea prepared by his landlady and becomes completely immobile. The landlady has a hobby of collecting and stuffing her "pets", which include the tenants that she likes, her dog Basil, and her parrot, and she even sings hymns "with" them every Sunday. Supporting Cast: Laurie Main as Wilkins, George Pelling as Bert, Barry Harvey as Tom, Jill Livesey as Rosie, Burt Mustin as Old Man playing darts
211	20	"The Throwback"	John Brahm	Henry Slesar	Scott Marlowe as Eliot Gray, Murray Matheson as Cyril Hardeen, Joyce Meadows as Enid	February 28, 1961
Twenty-five-year-old Enid (Meadows) has two lovers, brash young 26-year-old Eliot Gray (Marlowe) and gentle 59-year-old widower Cyril Hardeen (Matheson). Eliot stops by Enid's house to offer a quiet night after two months together, but Enid strongly desires to go out and refuses to see Eliot on Saturday nights. When directly confronted, Enid finally admits that she has been seeing Cyril for over four years, so Eliot gives her an ultimatum and finally tells Enid that he loves her. The two men meet when Eliot travels to Cyril's sprawling home and is invited in by Cyril's manservant (Indrisano), and the two discuss what they can offer Enid (youth versus romanticism). While having a drink together in his basement, Cyril challenges Eliot to unarmed combat and the more sophisticated Cyril frames Eliot by having him beat up by a substitute fighter, his manservant Joseph, and then having Joseph and he (Cyril) box to make it look as though Cyril and Eliot fought. Police Sergeant Marsh and Sergeant Baker (McLeod) stop by Eliot's home to question him and take him to Cyril's for identification, and Cyril claims that Eliot beat him up, although he refuses to file charges. Enid refuses to believe the truth and leaves Eliot for Cyril. Supporting Cast: John Indrisano as Joseph the Manservant, Bert Remsen as Police Lieutenant Marsh, Howard McLeod as Police Sergeant Baker
212	21	"The Kiss-Off"	Alan Crosland, Jr.	Story by : John P. Foran; Teleplay by : Talmage Powell	Rip Torn as Ernie Walters	March 7, 1961
Thirty-five-year-old Ernie Walters (Torn) robs the department of state revenue by holding up the tax clerk (Keefer) at lunchtime for $12,000. He leaves behind a hotel key for room 402 that is found by hostage Mrs. Simmons (MacMichael) before traveling in a taxi and amicably joking with the driver (Swoger). He then visits his girlfriend Florrie (Munday), who doesn't recognize him until he removes the makeup used to hide his identity. They talk of spending a honeymoon in Pensacola, but he wants her to leave immediately before he joins her in a week's time. He is newly released from prison after serving six years for a crime of which he was only just proven to be innocent (robbing a gas station). Meanwhile, Detective Cooper (Freed) investigates the crime scene and checks about the hotel room key while Mrs. Simmons complains about wanting to go home and the tax clerk tallies the financial losses from the robbery. In order to get back at the detective and district attorney who convicted him, Ernie leaves just enough "flaws" in his plan (registering the hotel room in his name) that Detective Cooper and District Attorney Phillip Bentley (Patterson) suspect that he is the culprit, but they are unable to pursue a case against him. The hotel desk clerk (Sully) swears that there are no extra keys (although Ernie worked in the machine shop while incarcerated) and Cooper finds no evidence after ransacking Ernie's room. When taken for a police line-up, the two male witnesses state only that there is a passing resemblance, with only Mrs. Simmons somewhat believing him to be the culprit but still unsure. DA Bentley, lacking in enough reliable evidence and witnesses, orders Ernie to get out of town and never come back. Ernie gladly replies that he can afford to before leaving. Supporting Cast: Bert Freed as Detective Cooper, Florence MacMichael as Mrs. Simmons, Mary Munday as Florrie, Kenneth Patterson as District Attorney Phillip Bentley, Don Keefer as Tax Clerk, Frank Sully as Desk Clerk, Harry Swoger as Taxi Driver
213	22	"The Horseplayer"	Alfred Hitchcock	Henry Slesar	Claude Rains as Father Amion, Ed Gardner as Sheridan	March 14, 1961
Father Amion (Rains) hosts a service on a rainy day with a leaky roof when Mr. Cheever (Ragan) visits to outline the physical infrastructure problems of the church at a cost of around $1500. Collector of church funds Morton (Helton) gives Father Amion a ten-dollar bill from a new attendee, more than has been seen in quite a while. The newest arrival at Father Amion's church is Sheridan (Gardner), a gambler who believes that prayer has caused his recent success at the horse races with six winners in eight races. After visiting an elderly parishioner (Murphy), Father Amion runs into Sheridan while walking, and Sheridan tells him that he has now won 14 out of 18 races. Father Amion disapproves of gambling but, due to shortage of funds to fix the church, visits his bank teller (Newell) and then gives Sheridan his life savings of $500 to bet on a "sure" winning horse named "Sally's Pal". Father Amion is quickly remorseful and confesses to Bishop Cannon (MacKenna), who states that they both must pray that the horse loses instead. Sheridan returns with news that the horse just missed winning and declares that he will stop gambling and go back to the hardware business, which pleases Father Amion. However, Father Amion is surprised to get his money back with a little extra ($2100 total), because Sheridan put his bet on the horse to place, not to win. Supporting Cast: Percy Helton as Morton, Kenneth MacKenna as Bishop Cannon, Mike Ragan as Mr. Cheever, William Newell as Second Bank Teller, David Carlile as First Bank Teller, Ada Murphy as Elderly Woman, Lillian O'Malley as Ailing Parishioner (uncredited), John Yount as Altar Boy (uncredited), Jackie Carroll as Altar Boy (uncredited)
214	23	"Incident in a Small Jail"	Norman Lloyd	Henry Slesar	John Fiedler as Leon Gorwald, Richard Jaeckel as the Suspect / Mechanic, Ron Nicholas as Deputy Bill 'Sandy' Sanderson	March 21, 1961
Traveling haberdashery salesman Leon Gorwald (Fiedler) of Philadelphia is arrested in a small town for jaywalking and attempted bribery of a deputy sheriff (Healey) and placed in jail. Gorwald repeatedly requests a hearing before a magistrate judge, while the sheriff, Monty (Denton), and the deputy, Carly, discuss a recent murder of a local girl. Soon enough, the sheriff orders Carly and another deputy, Bill 'Sandy' Sanderson (Nicholas), to bring in a suspected serial killer (Jaeckel) and place him in the adjacent cell. When the deputies notice that a lynch mob is forming in local Petrie's Bar, the sheriff decides to move the suspected killer. The suspect knocks out the sheriff and escapes just before a lynch mob led by Petrie (Challee) storms the jail, but he forces Gorwald to trade clothing before leaving. Gorwald is mistakenly taken to be lynched but is saved by Sandy and Carly at the last moment. However, the escaped suspect was, in fact, an innocent man, and Gorwald is the real killer. After being released, Gorwald is last seen putting a knife in his jacket pocket and picking up a hitchhiking girl (Dupuis) with malicious intent imprinted upon his face. Supporting Cast: Myron Healey as Carly the Deputy, Crahan Denton as Monty the Sheriff, William Challee as Petrie the Bartender, Joan Dupuis as Girl
215	24	"A Woman's Help"	Arthur Hiller	Henry Slesar	Geraldine Fitzgerald as Elizabeth Burton, Scott McKay as Arnold Burton, Antoinette Bower as Miss Greco	March 28, 1961
Arnold Burton (McKay) is controlled by his domineering but invalid wife, Elizabeth (Fitzgerald), and he has his servant Chester (Lontoc) prepare an egg exactly to her specifications. When the attractive Miss Greco (Bower) is hired as Elizabeth's nurse, she and the Shakespeare-reading Arnold begin an affair and slowly poison Elizabeth by overdosing her medicine. Before she can die, Elizabeth catches them kissing and fires Miss Greco. Elizabeth then hires an older woman (O'Malley) to be her nurse, not knowing that the woman is Arnold's mother, who helps him continue to poison Elizabeth. Supporting Cast: Leon Lontoc (credited as Leon Lontok) as Chester, Lillian O'Malley as Arnold's Mother (the Last Nurse)
216	25	"Museum Piece"	Paul Henreid	Story by : William C. Morrison; Teleplay by : Harold Swanton	Larry Gates as Mr. Hollister, Myron McCormick as Newton B. Clovis	April 4, 1961
Mr. Hollister (Gates) is curator of a small museum that displays trinkets and human remains. He is visited by Newton B. Clovis (McCormick) who claims to be an archaeo-psychologist. They peruse through Hollister's collection before focusing on one particular skeleton, which Hollister said that he knew and who Clovis says was an athlete. Hollister tells him that the museum's collection was made by his son, Ben (Convy), who died after being erroneously convicted of first-degree murder. Clovis determines that Ben was kind and caring. A flashback details how Ben hunted down a gray fox in a neighbor's barn while lovers Tim McCaffrey (Gilleran) and his girlfriend (Tompkins) watched. Tim struck Ben down with a pitchfork, and Ben's gun fired when he fell, killing Tim. Hollister was angry that District Attorney Mr. Henshaw (Platt) did nothing to stop the newspaper and the public from predetermining Ben to be guilty of murder. Henshaw used Ben's marksmanship (hitting the eye with every shot) against him while the judge (Meredith) struggled to maintain order in the courtroom and the defense attorney (Bradley) struggled to keep Ben from consistently committing outbursts. Henshaw also refused to help Ben get any leniency on his sentence, and Ben would be dead within two months after losing the will to live. After their discussion of the events, Clovis examines the skeleton's teeth. It is revealed that the modern skeleton in the museum belongs to Henshaw, and Clovis is investigating that murder as a member of the district attorney's office. When Clovis turns away to look at the skeleton, Hollister stabs and kills him. The episode ends as Hollister takes another group on a tour of the museum, this time examining both Henshaw's and Clovis' skeletons. Supporting Cast: Edward Platt as District Attorney Mr. Henshaw, Bert Convy as Ben Hollister, Tom Gilleran as Tim McCaffrey, Darlene Tompkins as Tim's Girlfriend, Charles Meredith as Judge, Paul Bradley as Defense Attorney, Tom Begley as Prison Guard, Joseph Crehan as Juror (uncredited), Ralph Brooks as Juror (uncredited), John Barton as Juror (uncredited), Oliver Cross as Museum Patron (uncredited), Chalky Williams as Museum Patron (uncredited), John Zimeas as Museum Patron (uncredited), Charles Perry as Museum Patron (uncredited)
217	26	"Coming, Mama"	George Stevens, Jr.	Story by : Henriette McClelland; Teleplay by : James Cavanagh	Eileen Heckart as Lucy Baldwin, Don DeFore as Arthur Clark	April 11, 1961
Lucy Baldwin (Heckart) and her lover Arthur Clark (DeFore) arrive at Lucy's home in a hurry after being alerted by housekeeper Mrs. Evans (Fax) of a supposed heart attack involving Lucy's mother (Kennedy). Dr. Larson (Malet) tells Lucy that the whole episode was made up by Mrs. Baldwin to get Lucy home and advises that Lucy get out more. Lucy has waited on her malingering mother her whole life, to the point where she is not allowed to get married. Lucy and her mother argue over Mrs. Baldwin's shenanigans and Lucy's desire to get married despite her mother's protestations and threat to leave her wealth to charity if Lucy does indeed marry. When Lucy's lover Arthur (DeFore) proposes for the last time, Lucy overdoses her mother's sleeping medicine successfully. Lawyer Mr. Simon (Karnes) sees the transfer of Mrs. Baldwin's limited properties to Lucy and reveals that Mrs. Baldwin's wealth came from an annuity, so Lucy will receive no more money. However, after Lucy marries Arthur, she discovers that Arthur's mother (Bonney) is exactly the same kind of demanding, malingering woman that her mother had been. Lucy is forced to give up her honeymoon and become Mrs. Clark's full-time nurse, so she suggests to Arthur that they get some sleeping medicine for Mrs. Clark. Supporting Cast: Madge Kennedy as Mrs. Baldwin, Robert Karnes as Mr. Simon, Arthur Malet as Dr. Larson, Jesslyn Fax as Mrs. Evans, Gail Bonney as Mrs. Clark
218	27	"Deathmate"	Alan Crosland, Jr.	Story by : James Causey; Teleplay by : Bill S. Ballinger	Lee Philips as Ben Conan / Fred Sheldon, Gia Scala as Lisa Talbot, Russell Collins as Alvin Moss	April 18, 1961
Ben Conan (Philips) and Peter Talbot (Tremayne) count up how much money Talbot owes Sheldon while Talbot's wife Lisa (Scala) criticizes him for his losses. Peter collapses from alcoholic consumption and Lisa embraces Ben romantically, detailing to Ben how she wants to divorce Peter but cannot afford to because of community property laws. Ben is actually a con artist named Fred Sheldon who targets wealthy married women and claims his wealth comes from owning a silver mine. His current con on Lisa is threatened by private detective and former San Francisco vice squad detective Alvin Moss (Collins), who knows about his past and his various aliases. Fred tells Lisa that Peter is pressing him and asks Lisa for $10,000 for his fake mine. Fred murders Peter by drowning him in the bathtub, but then Moss immediately arrives and tells Fred that he was, in fact, hired by Lisa, who used Fred to kill her husband by convincing Fred that Peter had heart problems. Supporting Cast: Les Tremayne as Peter Talbot, Ann Staunton as Woman
219	28	"Gratitude"	Alan Crosland, Jr.	Story by : Donne Byrne; Teleplay by : William Fay	Peter Falk as Meyer Fine, Paul Hartman as John	April 25, 1961
New York, 1916. Meyer Fine (Falk) is a casino owner with a crippling fear of death. Meyer and valet John (Hartman), who fears lobsters, discuss an injured dealer and gambling winnings. Then he talks with bartender Frank (Gordon) about a wild gambler, Young Combs (Stewart), who is the son of a notable city official. After bouncer Hubert (Hoyt) informs Meyer that Combs killed himself in the subway upon leaving the illegal gambling establishment, a policeman (Remsen) stops by to threaten shutting down Meyer's business, as well as that of two other casino owners named Masotti (Hashim) and Dumfee (Dennis). When he makes a mistake that threatens his business, by not preventing henchman Otto (Lukas) from killing a private investigator for taking a picture of his gambling parlor, his former partners put a hit out on him after killing Otto. As soon as he leaves his home, a drive-by shooting hits him, but he is only wounded. Meyer is terrified of waiting for them to finish the job, so he begs his loyal valet John to help kill him first, and John shoots him. Supporting Cast: Clegg Hoyt as Hubert, Karl Lukas as Otto, Phil Gordon as Frank the Bartender, Edmund Hashim as Masotti, John Dennis as Joe Dumfee, Adam Stewart as Young Combs, Bert Remsen as Policeman Note: The actor who played the private investigator is uncredited and currently unknown.
220	29	"The Pearl Necklace"	Don Weis	Peggy and Lou Shaw	Hazel Court as Charlotte Jameson Rutherford, Ernest Truex as Howard Rutherford, Jack Cassidy as Mark Lansing	May 2, 1961
Wealthy 65-year-old Howard Rutherford (Truex) proposes to his 25-year-old secretary Charlotte (Court). Charlotte's current lover, Mark (Cassidy), makes Charlotte accept so they can live on Howard's fortune of $11 million when he dies, a plan of which even Howard approves as he believes that he has only about a year to live. However, Howard lives on for years while being looked after by a nurse (O'Hara), and he gifts Charlotte a pearl for her necklace every year. Meanwhile, Mark marries someone else (Webber) and has a son named Billy (Burns). When Mark stops by to see Charlotte, she and Billy connect over a shared love of tennis, though she desires no relationship with Mark whatsoever. They play every summer, and Howard even agrees to send Billy to prep school. Howard finally dies at 90 on their twenty-fifth anniversary, and to Mark's dismay, 50-year-old Charlotte begins a new love affair and marriage with his son, Billy (Faulkner), who is now 20 years old. Supporting Cast: Michael Burns as Billy Lansing, David Faulkner as Older Billy Lansing, Shirley O'Hara as Nurse, Diane Webber as Other Woman
221	30	"You Can't Trust a Man"	Paul Henreid	Helen Nielsen	Polly Bergen as Crystal Coe, Joe Maross as Tony Coe	May 9, 1961
Successful singer Crystal Coe (Bergen) complains to her maid Pauline (Carleton) about her monotonous life. She tried to erase all evidence of her sordid past, and the only person who knows the truth is her husband Tony (Maross), who spent seven years in prison after taking the fall for Crystal's petty theft and is upset that he received no letters from her or even a birth announcement of their child. Tony arrives after a show, and they go for a drive and talk while a gas station attendant (Romano) checks on the automobile. Crystal signals to the attendant that she needs help while Tony anxiously looks over the gun he used for past crimes, which Crystal saved. Tony tries to get out of the vehicle, but Crystal refuses to let him leave. When the police pull behind her with sirens blaring, Crystal pulls the gun and shoots Tony. She tells the policeman (Britton) and a lieutenant (Kinsella) that Tony was a random stalker that tried to kill her, and her current 'husband' George Wyncliff (Albertson) takes her home. However, she learns that Tony filed for an invention patent for electronic equipment and the police are tracking down his beneficiaries. Supporting Cast: Claire Carleton as Pauline, Frank Albertson as George Wyncliff, Walter Kinsella as Lieutenant, Andy Romano as Gas Station Attendant, Keith Britton as Policeman
222	31	"The Gloating Place"	Alan Crosland, Jr.	Robert Bloch	Susan Harrison as Susan Harper, Hank Brandt (credited as Henry Brandt) as the Police Detective	May 16, 1961
Lonely high school student Susan Harper (Harrison) talks with her friend Marjorie Stone (Kristen) until Susan's crush Tom (Gilleran) comes outside, but Tom is more interested in Marjorie than Susan. Susan turns down friend Eva (Henreid) offering to walk home together and she walks alone instead. While walking through a park, Susan pretends to be attacked by a masked man in order to get attention. She is successful and a police detective (Brandt) takes her home to tell her parents (Calder and Moore) and get a description. Reporter Eve (McVeagh) and a photographer (Fresco) arrive to interview her for the newspaper. She almost picks out a suspect (Martin) from a police lineup until Sergeant Martin (McVey) reminds her that she is contradicting her own story. When the community moves on to the next big news of sibling students dying in a climbing accident, she strangles the school's most popular girl, Marjorie, to make it seem as though the "masked man" is responsible. Susan is pleased to be relevant again, but her actions have inspired a copycat masked man, and he attacks and strangles her at the same park pond where she had planned everything in the beginning. Supporting Cast: Marta Kristen as Marjorie Stone, Erin O'Brien-Moore as Mrs. Linda Harper, King Calder as Mr. Harper, Tyler McVey as Sergeant Martin, Tom Gilleran as Tom, Monika Henreid (credited as Monica Henreid) as Eva the Student, David Fresco as Photographer, Eve McVeagh as Eve the Reporter (uncredited), Kreg Martin as Man in Police Lineup (uncredited)
223	32	"Self Defense"	Paul Henreid	John T. Kelley	George Nader as Gerald R. Clarke, Audrey Totter as Mrs. Philips	May 23, 1961
Gerald Clarke (Nader) is a World War II veteran soldier with PTSD. When he is held at gunpoint by a young robber, Jimmy Philips (Paget), at a liquor store, he takes the store's gun from owner Mrs. Gruber (Fax) and shoots the boy, killing him. Gerald, a radio engineer, is interviewed by police Lieutenant Schwartz (Gravers) and Sergeant Krebs (Carlile) about the incident and Gerald's trauma from the war. Although Gerald is exonerated by the police, the boy's mother, Mrs. Philips (Trotter), walks in and begins talking with Gerald, each not knowing who the other is initially. Gerald attends Jimmy's funeral to listen to the clergyman's (Jackson) sermon and speaks with Mrs. Philip's boss, Henry Willett (Lockwood), giving him money to pay for Jimmy's funeral service. Mr. Willett says that Mrs. Philips is a good woman, but she must confront the fact that Jimmy wasn't so good. After she visits Gerald at his radio station job, they agree to meet at his apartment later. There, she confronts Gerald with a gun demanding to know why he made three killing shots in a row (out of four total shots) when Jimmy's gun wasn't loaded. After a stand-off, Mrs. Philips puts the gun away and prepares to leave, but Gerald is triggered by her gun and shoots her repeatedly. Supporting Cast: Steve Gravers as Lieutenant Schwartz, Alexander Lockwood as Henry Willett, Jesslyn Fax as Mrs. Gruber, Robert Paget as Jimmy Philips, David Carlile as Sergeant Krebs, Selmer Jackson as Clergyman
224	33	"A Secret Life"	Don Weis	Story by : Nicholas Monsarrat; Teleplay by : Jerry Sohl	Ronald Howard as James Howgill, Mary Murphy as Estelle, Patricia Donahue as Marjorie Howgill	May 31, 1961
Art gallery owner James "Jim" Howgill (Howard) wants to divorce his wife Marjorie (Donahue) but has no grounds for it, other than being bored, but Marjorie doesn't believe in it. He travels to Acapulco and has a fun time with beautiful Estelle (Murphy) at a beach party. Afterward, he sees an attorney, Mr. Johnson (Richards), about a divorce, but Mr. Johnson convinces him to check in on Marjorie, as he has no real grounds for divorce. At Johnson's recommendation, he reluctantly hires a private investigator, Mr. Bates (Johnson), who visits Jim at the gallery and is introduced by employee Mrs. Hackett (MacMichael). Bates tails Marjorie, and Jim is shocked to hear that his wife has been throwing parties and has an actor named Niles Brandon as her lover. Jim is jealous and starts ignoring the caring and patient Estelle, who finally leaves him. Jim reconciles with Marjorie after discussing her new hobbies, but later learns that Bates had been following the wrong woman, an actress named Kathleen Perry (Welles) who looks very similar to Marjorie and had been subletting the house while Marjorie was in San Francisco. Supporting Cast: Florence MacMichael as Mrs. Hackett, Addison Richards as Mr. Johnson, Arte Johnson as Mr. Bates the Private Investigator, Meri Welles as Kathleen Perry
225	34	"Servant Problem"	Alan Crosland, Jr.	Henry Slesar	Jo Van Fleet as Molly Drake, John Emery as Kerwin Drake / Merwin	June 6, 1961
Successful author Kerwin Drake (Emery) comes home to his secretary Tina (Johnston) preparing hors d'oeuvres for his coming guests. He receives a surprise visit from Molly (Van Fleet), the wife he walked out on 22 years ago. Molly saw him in the society pages. Kerwin has made a new name and new life for himself with the much younger Sylvia Colton (Hackett) and refuses to acknowledge Molly, who is consigned to an upstairs bedroom when she refuses his money or to get a hotel room as she has nowhere to stay that night. Instead, he tells his publisher Harold Standish (Rhodes) and friends Mr. and Mrs. George Colton (Robinson, Givney), as well as his assistant Lydia Standish (Frost), that Molly is his cook. Later, Kerwin visits Molly at her apartment and offers her up to $10,000 to leave him alone. They argue and he strangles her to death. The murder is witnessed by Standish, who was at the apartment to hire Molly as a cook. Supporting Cast: Joan Hackett as Sylvia Colton, Bartlett Robinson as George Colton, Kathryn Givney as Mrs. Colton, Grandon Rhodes as Harold Standish, Alice Frost as Lydia Standish, Jane A. Johnston as Tina
226	35	"Coming Home"	Alf Kjellin	Henry Slesar	Crahan Denton as Harry Beggs, Jeanette Nolan as Edith Beggs	June 13, 1961
Fifty-year-old Harry Beggs (Denton) visits the warden (Carson) and the prison cashier (Swoger) to leave prison with $1,636 of back pay from 20 years of working in the prison work camps in construction. A bus driver (Perkins) takes him to the bank where the teller (Lloyd) cashes his check. He stops at a bar and calls his estranged wife Edith (Nolan), but he cannot bring himself to speak to her. He is then tricked by the bartender Lucky (Martin) and a young woman named Angela (Silo) into getting drunk, and all of his money has been stolen by the time he wakes up at 1:00 AM. After angrily accusing the bartender of stealing his wallet, the bartender throws him out. A man on the street (Lamont) advises to him to go home, and as he has nowhere else to go, Harry goes to his estranged wife Edith's house for a reunion. They discuss his crime of shooting at a police officer during a holdup and her anger at him. Although she never visited him at the prison, she doesn't believe in divorce. They reconcile as he shows his guilt at losing the money. As they embrace, Angela walks in the door with a shiny new earring. They are both dismayed to discover that they are, in fact, father and daughter. Supporting Cast: Susan Silo as Angela, Bob Carson (credited as Robert Carson) as Warden, Josie Lloyd as Bank Teller, Kreg Martin as Lucky the Bartender, Gil Perkins as Bus Driver (uncredited), Harry Swoger as Prison Cashier (uncredited), Syl Lamont as Man (uncredited)
227	36	"Final Arrangements"	Gordon Hessler	Story by : Lawrence A. Page; Teleplay by : Robert Arthur	Martin Balsam as Leonard Thompson, Vivian Nathan as Elise 'Elsie' Thompson, Slim Pickens as Bradshaw	June 20, 1961
Leonard Thompson (Balsam) visits Simms Mortuary to get information from owner Simms (Whitehead) about the highest quality of funeral arrangements for $4,780, which he agrees to purchase. Thompson is tired of being stuck with his miserly and invalid wife Elise 'Elsie' (Nathan) and longs for adventure anywhere else. After his secretary (Brown) informs him, he goes to see hobbyist merchant Bradshaw (Pickens) and looks over exotic foreign weapons. Meanwhile, Elsie is visited by Dr. Maxwell (Robinson) at their home, and she blames Leonard for her illness by taking her to Haiti, where she got sick. Maxwell says that she could live another 30 years if she would only exercise more often, a thought that Leonard dreads to hear. Thompson purchases the funeral arrangements in cash, quits his job, and runs into bicycling neighbor child Billy Howard (Russell), whom he gives life advice after dropping an amulet, buying movie tickets, and talking of going on a big trip. Thompson then goes to purchase poison from the pharmacy clerk (Kane) and pours it into a glass of milk, but it is not for Elsie — instead, Leonard commits suicide by drinking it just as Simms comes to collect the body. Supporting Cast: Bartlett Robinson as Dr. Maxwell, O.Z. Whitehead as Simms, Bryan Russell as Billy Howard, Susan Brown as Secretary, George Kane as Pharmacy Clerk
228	37	"Make My Death Bed"	Arthur Hiller	Story by : Babs H. Deal; Teleplay by : Henry A. Cogge	Diana Van der Vlis as Elise Taylor, James Best as Bish Darby	June 27, 1961
Married Elise Taylor (der Vlis) is having an affair with married farm equipment salesman Bish Darby (Best), and they flirt cautiously while at a New Year's party with Bish's wife Jackie (Sherwood) and Elise's husband Ken (Flynn). Others, such as Dr. Bob Hudson (Elliot) and wife Della (Brando), notice Bish's charisma while he sings. Bish and Jackie's children Bob (Rush) and Mattie (Whitney) adore their father and greatly miss him when he goes on business trips. While Jackie is away on a trip to her parents in Mississippi, Ken walks in on the pair and shoots Bish dead. Elise even tells friend Della that she married Ken because she thought he would let her get away with anything. Dr. Hudson is called to the scene as Police officers (Lockwood) watch. When Dr. Hudson calls Jackie, she confesses to the murder, thinking that Bish drank her poisoned saccharin. Elise, though, drank the saccharin with her coffee after Bish was shot, herself then shortly dying afterward. Supporting Cast: Jocelyn Brando as Della Hudson, Biff Elliot as Dr. Bob Hudson, Joe Flynn as Ken Taylor, Madeleine Sherwood as Jackie Darby, Dennis Rush as Bob Darby, Judy Whitney (credited as Judy Erwin) as Mattie Darby, Alexander Lockwood as Police Officer
229	38	"Ambition"	Paul Henreid	Story by : Charles Boeckman; Teleplay by : Joel Murcott	Leslie Nielsen as District Attorney Rudy Cox, Harold J. Stone as Mac Davis	July 4, 1961
District Attorney Rudy Cox (Nielsen) is gardening when he gets a visit from Assistant DA Cliff Woodman about information leaking that they have indecent connections to criminals. Cox has been hiding his relationship with racketeer Mac Davis (Stone), who saved his life in the war in Germany years ago. Davis goes to an apartment he holds, only for him to be met by associate Ernie Stillinger (Landers), who is armed and desperate to dispose of evidence that will be used against him at trial. Davis promises Ernie that he will fix things regarding witness Lou Heinz (Kates), as Ernie has no desire to return to jail. Cox meets with the mayor (Arnt) to discuss Heinz as a witness and the relationship between Cox and Davis, and the mayor threatens to remove Cox if he doesn't get an indictment and conviction. Cox goes to meet Heinz, who holds all the evidence in his mind, rather than on paper. A zippo lighter outlining the initials "M.D." and "1944" is left behind at Heinz's apartment hideout as a threat, after he had gone out to obtain alcohol and was apparently seen. Cox goes home to spend time with his wife Helen (Robinson), but she leaves, and Davis arrives afterward in secret. Davis tells Cox to drop the case and also that he is going straight and will leave the business to get married. However, a police lieutenant (McLeod) stops by the next day to tell Cox that Heinz was killed that night around 10:00 PM, and Davis's only alibi is that he was with Cox at the time of the murder, but Cox refuses to acknowledge Davis and says that he has not seen him since he took office. Supporting Cast: Harry Landers as Ernie Stillinger, Bernard Kates as Lou Heinz, Ann Robinson as Helen Cox, Charles Arnt as George the Mayor, Charles Carlson as Cliff Woodman, Howard McLeod as Police Lieutenant, Syl Lamont as Hoodlum
