= Sydney Pollack =

American filmmaker and actor (1934–2008)

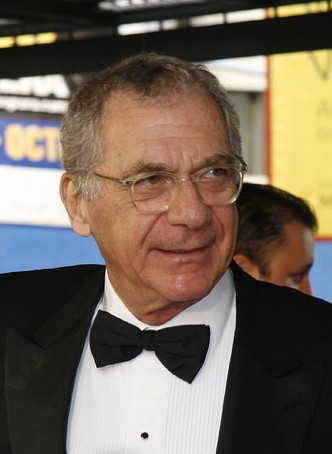
- Pollack at the Metropolitan Opera House, 2006
- Born: Sydney Irwin Pollack; July 1, 1934; Lafayette, Indiana, U.S.
- Died: May 26, 2008 (aged 73); Los Angeles, California, U.S.
- Occupations: Film director; producer; actor
- Years active: 1955–2008
- Spouse: Claire Bradley Griswold (m. 1958)
- Children: 3

Sydney Irwin Pollack (July 1, 1934 – May 26, 2008) was an American film director, producer, and actor. Known for directing commercially and critically acclaimed studio films, he received numerous accolades, including two Academy Awards and two Primetime Emmy Awards, in addition to nominations for three Golden Globe Awards and six BAFTA Awards in a career spanning more than 40 years.

Pollack won the Academy Awards for Best Director and Best Picture for Out of Africa (1985). He was also nominated for Academy Awards for Best Director for They Shoot Horses, Don't They? (1969) and Tootsie (1982). Pollack's other notable films include This Property Is Condemned (1966), Jeremiah Johnson (1972), The Way We Were (1973), The Yakuza (1974), Three Days of the Condor (1975), Absence of Malice (1981), The Firm (1993), and Sabrina (1995).

Pollack produced and acted in Michael Clayton (2007). Other films he produced include The Fabulous Baker Boys (1989), Presumed Innocent (1990), Sense and Sensibility (1995), The Talented Mr. Ripley (1999), Iris (2001), Cold Mountain (2003) and The Reader (2008). Pollack also acted in Tootsie (1982), Robert Altman's The Player (1992), Woody Allen's Husbands and Wives (1993), and Stanley Kubrick's Eyes Wide Shut (1999).

== Early life ==
Pollack was born in Lafayette, Indiana, to a family of Jewish immigrants, the son of Rebecca (née Miller) and David Pollack, a semi-professional boxer and pharmacist. The family relocated to South Bend, and his parents divorced when he was young. His mother, who suffered from alcoholism and emotional problems, died at age 37, when Pollack was 16.

Despite earlier plans to attend college and then medical school, Pollack left Indiana for New York City soon after finishing high school at 17. From 1952 to 1954 he studied acting with Sanford Meisner at the Neighborhood Playhouse School of the Theatre, working on a lumber truck between terms.

Pollack was drafted for two years' army service as a truck driver at Fort Carson, Colorado, ending in 1958. He returned to the Playhouse at Meisner's invitation to become his assistant. In 1960, John Frankenheimer, a friend of Pollack's, asked him to work in Los Angeles as a dialogue coach for the child actors in Frankenheimer's first big movie, The Young Savages. During this time Pollack met Burt Lancaster, who encouraged him to try directing.

== Career ==
Pollack played a director in the 1960 The Twilight Zone episode "The Trouble with Templeton". He made his feature film debut as an actor in Denis Sanders's War Hunt (1962), where he met Robert Redford, the male lead in seven films Pollack directed.

Pollack first found success in television in the 1960s by directing episodes of series, such as The Fugitive and The Alfred Hitchcock Hour. After that he directed a string of movies that drew public attention. His directorial debut was The Slender Thread (1965). Pollack's films received 48 Academy Award nominations and won 11 Oscars. His first Oscar nomination was for his 1969 film They Shoot Horses, Don't They?, and his second in 1982 for Tootsie. For his 1985 film Out of Africa, starring Meryl Streep and Robert Redford, Pollack won Academy Awards for directing and producing. His other notable films include Jeremiah Johnson (1972), The Way We Were (1973), The Yakuza (1974), Absence of Malice (1981), The Firm (1993), and Sabrina (1995).

Pollack directed 12 actors in Oscar-nominated performances: Jane Fonda, Gig Young, Susannah York, Barbra Streisand, Paul Newman, Melinda Dillon, Jessica Lange, Dustin Hoffman, Teri Garr, Meryl Streep, Klaus Maria Brandauer, and Holly Hunter. Young and Lange won Oscars for their performances in Pollack's films.

In 1984, Pollack helped found the American Cinematheque in Los Angeles, becoming co-chairman.

One of a select group of non- and/or former actors awarded membership in the Actors Studio, Pollack resumed acting in the 1990s with appearances in Robert Altman's The Player (1992) and Stanley Kubrick's Eyes Wide Shut (1999), often playing corrupt or morally conflicted power figures. As a character actor, he appeared in films such as A Civil Action (1998), and Changing Lanes (2002), as well as his own, including Three Days of the Condor (1975), The Electric Horseman (1979), Random Hearts (1999), and The Interpreter (2005, his final non-documentary film as a director). He also appeared in Woody Allen's Husbands and Wives (1992) as a New York lawyer undergoing a midlife crisis, and in Robert Zemeckis's Death Becomes Her (1992) as an emergency room doctor. His last role was as Patrick Dempsey's father in the 2008 romantic comedy Made of Honor, which was in theaters at the time of his death. He was a recurring guest star on the NBC sitcom Will & Grace, playing Will Truman's (Eric McCormack) unfaithful but loving father, George. He also appeared on NBC's Just Shoot Me and Mad About You and in 2007 made guest appearances on HBO's The Sopranos and Entourage.

Pollack received the first annual Extraordinary Contribution to Filmmaking award from the Austin Film Festival on October 21, 2006. As a producer, he helped guide many films that were successful with both critics and audiences, such as The Fabulous Baker Boys (1989), Sense and Sensibility (1995), The Talented Mr. Ripley (1999), Iris (2001), Cold Mountain (2003), and Michael Clayton (2007), a film in which he also starred and for which he received his sixth Academy Award nomination, in the Best Picture category. Pollack and the English director Anthony Minghella formed the production company Mirage Enterprises. The last film they produced together, The Reader (2008), earned them both posthumous Oscar nominations for Best Picture. Pollack was also nominated for five Primetime Emmys, earning two: one for directing in 1966 and another for producing, which was given four months after his death in 2008.

The moving image collection of Sydney Pollack is housed at the Academy Film Archive.

== Influences ==
In the 2002 Sight & Sound Directors' Poll, Pollack listed his top ten films in alphabetical order:

- Casablanca (1943)
- Citizen Kane (1941)
- The Conformist (1970)
- The Godfather Part II (1974)
- Grand Illusion (1937)
- The Leopard (1963)
- Once Upon a Time in America (1984)
- Raging Bull (1980)
- The Seventh Seal (1957)
- Sunset Boulevard (1950)

== Personal life ==
Pollack was married to Claire Bradley Griswold, a former student of his, from 1958 until his death in 2008. They had three children.

== Death ==
Concerns about Pollack's health surfaced in 2007, when he withdrew from directing HBO's television film Recount, which aired on May 25, 2008. He died from cancer the next day at his home in Los Angeles's Pacific Palisades neighborhood, aged 73. He had been diagnosed about ten months before his death; the type of cancer has been variously cited as pancreatic, stomach, or of unknown primary origin.

== Filmography ==
=== Film ===
Directing and producing

Year	Title	Director	Producer	Notes
1965	The Slender Thread	Yes	No	Paramount Pictures
1966	This Property Is Condemned	Yes	No	Paramount Pictures
1968	The Scalphunters	Yes	No	United Artists
1969	Castle Keep	Yes	No	Columbia Pictures
1969	They Shoot Horses, Don't They?	Yes	No	Cinerama Releasing Corporation
1972	Jeremiah Johnson	Yes	No	Warner Bros.
1973	The Way We Were	Yes	No	Columbia Pictures
1974	The Yakuza	Yes	Yes	Warner Bros.
1975	Three Days of the Condor	Yes	No	Paramount Pictures
1977	Bobby Deerfield	Yes	Yes	Warner Bros./Columbia Pictures
1979	The Electric Horseman	Yes	No	Columbia Pictures/Universal Pictures
1981	Absence of Malice	Yes	No	Columbia Pictures
1982	Tootsie	Yes	Yes	Columbia Pictures
1985	Out of Africa	Yes	Yes	Universal Pictures
1990	Havana	Yes	No	Universal Pictures
1993	The Firm	Yes	Yes	Paramount Pictures
1995	Sabrina	Yes	Yes	Paramount Pictures
1999	Random Hearts	Yes	Yes	Columbia Pictures
2005	The Interpreter	Yes	No	Universal Pictures
2006	Sketches of Frank Gehry	Yes	Executive	Sony Pictures Classics
2018	Amazing Grace	Yes	No	Neon

As executive producer

- Sanford Meisner: The American Theatre's Best Kept Secret (1985)
- The Fabulous Baker Boys (1989)
- King Ralph (1991)
- Searching for Bobby Fischer (1993)
- Sense and Sensibility (1995)
- The Talented Mr. Ripley (1999)
- Blow Dry (2001)
- Iris (2001)
- Birthday Girl (2001)
- The Quiet American (2002)
- Catch a Fire (2006)
- Leatherheads (2008)
- Recount (2008)

As producer only

- Songwriter (1984)
- Bright Lights, Big City (1988)
- Presumed Innocent (1990)
- Sliding Doors (1998)
- Cold Mountain (2003)
- Breaking and Entering (2006)
- Michael Clayton (2007)
- The Reader (2008)
- Margaret (2011)

Acting roles

Year	Title	Role	Notes
1962	War Hunt	Sergeant Owen Van Horn	
1975	Three Days of the Condor	Taxi Driver	
1979	The Electric Horseman	Man Who Makes Pass At Alice	Uncredited
1982	Tootsie	George Fields	
1992	The Player	Dick Mellon	
1992	Death Becomes Her	Emergency Room Doctor	Uncredited
1992	Husbands and Wives	Jack	
1998	A Civil Action	Al Eustis	
1999	Eyes Wide Shut	Victor Ziegler	
1999	Random Hearts	Carl Broman	
2001	The Majestic	Studio Executive	Voice
2002	Changing Lanes	Stephen Delano	
2005	The Interpreter	Secret Service Director Jay Pettigrew	Uncredited
2006	Fauteuils d'orchestre	Brian Sobinski	
2007	Michael Clayton	Marty Bach	
2008	Made of Honor	Thomas Bailey Sr.	Final film role

=== Television ===
Acting roles

Year	Title	Role	Notes
1956	The Kaiser Aluminum Hour	Shuber	Episode: "The Army Game"
1959	Playhouse 90	Andres	Episodes: "For Whom the Bell Tolls: Parts 1 & 2"
1959	The United States Steel Hour	Benson	Episode: "The Case of Julia Walton"
1959	Armstrong Circle Theatre	Albert Rousseau	Episode: "35 Rue Du Marche"
1959	Startime	Harry	Episode: "Something Special"
1959–1964	Brenner	Detective Al Dunn	3 episodes
1960	Alfred Hitchcock Presents	Bernie Samuelson	Season 6 Episode 4: "The Contest for Aaron Gold"
1960	The Twilight Zone	Arthur Willis	Episode: "The Trouble with Templeton"
1960	Tales of Wells Fargo	Stan Ryker	Episode: "Angry Town"
1961	The Untouchables	Charlie	Episode: "The Big Train Part One"
1961	Have Gun – Will Travel	Joe Culp	Episodes: "Quiet Night in Town: Part 1 & 2"
1961	The Deputy	Chuck Johnson	Episode: "Spoken in Silence"
1961	The Asphalt Jungle	Louie	Episode: "The Professor"
1961–1962	The New Breed	Austin Rogers; Bert Masters	2 episodes
1962	Ben Casey	Unknown	Episode: "Monument to an Aged Hunter"
1994	Frasier	Holden Thorpe (voice)	Episode: "The Candidate"
1998	Mad About You	Dr. Sydney Warren	Episode: "Cheating on Sheila"
2000	Just Shoot Me!	Himself	Episode: "A&E Biography: Nina Van Horn"
2000	King of the Hill	Grant Trimble	Voice; Season 4: "Episode 23"
2000–2006	Will & Grace	George Truman	4 episodes
2003	Charlie: The Life and Art of Charles Chaplin	Narrator	Voice; Documentary
2005	One Six Right: The Romance of Flying	Himself	Documentary
2006	American Masters	Narrator	Episode: "John Ford/John Wayne"
2007	The Sopranos	Warren Feldman	Episode: "Stage 5"
2007	Entourage	Himself	

== Accolades ==
Year	Award	Category	Project	Result
1970	Academy Awards	Best Director	They Shoot Horses, Don't They?	Nominated
1983	Academy Awards	Best Picture	Tootsie	Nominated
1983	Academy Awards	Best Director	Tootsie	Nominated
1986	Academy Awards	Best Picture	Out of Africa	Won
1986	Academy Awards	Best Director	Out of Africa	Won
2008	Academy Awards	Best Picture	Michael Clayton	Nominated
2009	Academy Awards	Best Picture	The Reader	Nominated
1963	Primetime Emmy Awards	Outstanding Directing – Drama Series	Ben Casey	Nominated
1964	Primetime Emmy Awards	Outstanding Directing – Drama Series	Bob Hope Presents the Chrysler Theatre	Nominated
1966	Primetime Emmy Awards	Outstanding Directing – Drama Series	Bob Hope Presents the Chrysler Theatre	Won
2008	Primetime Emmy Awards	Outstanding Television Movie	Recount	Won
2008	Primetime Emmy Awards	Outstanding Variety Special	James Taylor: One Man Band	Nominated
1969	Golden Globe Awards	Best Director	They Shoot Horses Don't They?	Nominated
1982	Golden Globe Awards	Best Director	Tootsie	Nominated
1985	Golden Globe Awards	Best Director	Out of Africa	Nominated
1983	British Academy Film Awards	Best Film	Tootsie	Nominated
1983	British Academy Film Awards	Best Director	Tootsie	Nominated
1998	British Academy Film Awards	Outstanding British Film	Sliding Doors	Nominated
2003	British Academy Film Awards	Best Film	Cold Mountain	Nominated
2003	British Academy Film Awards	Outstanding British Film	Cold Mountain	Nominated
2008	British Academy Film Awards	Best Film	The Reader	Nominated

Awards and nominations received by Pollack's films
Year	Title	Academy Awards		BAFTA Awards		Golden Globe Awards	
Year	Title	Nominations	Wins	Nominations	Wins	Nominations	Wins
1965	The Slender Thread	2				1	
1966	This Property Is Condemned					1	
1968	The Scalphunters					1	
1969	They Shoot Horses, Don't They?	9	1	6	1	6	1
1973	The Way We Were	6	2	1		2	1
1975	Three Days of the Condor	1				1	
1977	Bobby Deerfield					1	
1979	The Electric Horseman	1					
1981	Absence of Malice	3				2	
1982	Tootsie	10	1	9	2	5	3
1985	Out of Africa	11	7	7	3	6	3
1990	Havana	1				1	
1993	The Firm	2		1			
1995	Sabrina	2				3	
Total		48	11	24	6	30	8

Directed Academy Award performances
Under Pollack's direction, these actors have received Academy Award wins and nominations for their performances in their respective roles.

Year	Performer	Film	Result
Academy Award for Best Actor
1981	Paul Newman	Absence of Malice	Nominated
1982	Dustin Hoffman	Tootsie	Nominated
Academy Award for Best Supporting Actor
1969	Gig Young	They Shoot Horses, Don't They?	Won
1985	Klaus Maria Brandauer	Out of Africa	Nominated
Academy Award for Best Actress
1969	Jane Fonda	They Shoot Horses, Don't They?	Nominated
1973	Barbra Streisand	The Way We Were	Nominated
1985	Meryl Streep	Out of Africa	Nominated
Academy Award for Best Supporting Actress
1969	Susannah York	They Shoot Horses, Don't They?	Nominated
1981	Melinda Dillon	Absence of Malice	Nominated
1982	Jessica Lange	Tootsie	Won
1982	Teri Garr	Tootsie	Nominated
1993	Holly Hunter	The Firm	Nominated
