= Claire Bradley Griswold =

American actress and model (1936–2011)

- Griswold in The Twilight Zone
- Born: October 30, 1936; Honolulu, Hawaii, U.S.
- Died: March 28, 2011 (aged 74); West Hollywood, California, U.S.
- Occupations: Actress, model
- Years active: 1958-1963
- Spouse: Sydney Pollack (m. 1958; died 2008)
- Children: 3

Claire Bradley Griswold (October 30, 1936 – March 28, 2011) was an American actress and model, active in television during the late 1950s and early 1960s. She is perhaps best known as the wife of acclaimed film director and producer Sydney Pollack, whom she married in 1958.

== Early life ==
Born in Honolulu, Oahu, Hawaii, she was the daughter of General Francis H. Griswold and Jeff Bradley Southerland Griswold, and she had a sister Mary. She spent her childhood living in various locations including Japan, Germany, and Washington, D.C. When the family was in London, she studied ballet at the Sadlers Wells school.

Griswold eventually moved to New York City, where she pursued acting and studied at the Neighborhood Playhouse School of the Theatre. Before she began those studies she was a model, with her pictures appearing on the covers of Ladies' Home Journal and other magazines.

== Career ==
Griswold began her acting career in the late 1950s, appearing in a number of prominent American television series of the era.

Her work on The Alfred Hitchcock Hour led to a personal contract with director Alfred Hitchcock.

At the end of 1963, Griswold retired from acting to focus on raising her children and supporting her husband's career. She had been credited with approximately 20 television appearances during her years as an actress.

== Personal life ==
While studying acting, Griswold was a student of Sydney Pollack, who was then working as an acting teacher. The two married in 1958, and they had a son. Pollack became one of Hollywood's celebrated directors, winning two Academy Awards and two Primetime Emmy Awards. They were married for nearly 50 years.

Following her husband's death in 2008, Claire Griswold died on March 28, 2011 in West Hollywood, California at age 74 after suffering from Parkinson's disease.

== Legacy ==
Though her acting career was brief, Griswold was recognized by contemporaries as a talented performer. Architect Frank Gehry recalled meeting her through mutual friends and described her as an exceptionally striking personality.

== Filmography ==
Year	Title	Role	Notes
1958	77 Sunset Strip	—	television series
1958	Lawman	—	television series
1958-1961	Studio One	various	television series
1961	The Investigators	—	television series
1962	The Alfred Hitchcock Hour	—	television series
1963	The Twilight Zone	Alice Summers	Season 4, Episode 8: "Miniature"; with Robert Duvall
