= Miniature (The Twilight Zone) =

- The Twilight Zone episode
- Episode no.: Season 4 Episode 8
- Directed by: Walter Grauman
- Written by: Charles Beaumont
- Production code: 4862
- Original air date: February 21, 1963

Guest appearances
- Robert Duvall; Pert Kelton; Barbara Barrie; William Windom; John McLiam; Barney Phillips; Claire Bradley Griswold; Lennie Weinrib; Joan Chambers; Chet Stratton; Nina Roman; Richard Angarola; Sally Kellerman

Episode chronology
← Previous "Jess-Belle"	Next → "Printer's Devil"
- The Twilight Zone (1959 TV series) (season 4)

"Miniature" is episode 110 of the American television anthology series The Twilight Zone. It originally aired on February 21, 1963, on CBS. The story centers on a man's obsession with a dollhouse whose figures seem to be alive. The episode was originally withheld from syndication due to a plagiarism lawsuit that was later dismissed for lack of merit. Upon re-release in 1984, it became an early example of film colorization.

== Opening narration ==
To the average person, a museum is a place of knowledge, a place of beauty and truth and wonder. Some people come to study, others to contemplate, others to look for the sheer joy of looking. Charley Parkes has his own reasons. He comes to the museum to get away from the world. It isn't really the sixty-cent cafeteria meal that has drawn him here every day, it's the fact that here in these strange, cool halls he can be alone for a little while, really and truly alone. Anyway, that's how it was before he got lost and wandered into the Twilight Zone.

== Plot ==
Charley Parkes believes that he sees a figure in a museum dollhouse that comes alive. He returns to the museum numerous times and gazes into the dollhouse, repeatedly witnessing the doll in the house become animated. A guard tells him that the doll is not mechanical, but merely carved from a single block of wood, but this does not dissuade Charley.

Charley gradually falls in love with the figure, a woman portrayed by Claire Bradley Griswold, who is in an abusive relationship with a male figure in the dollhouse. In an attempt to rescue the female doll from the male doll, Charley breaks the glass and is subsequently committed to a psychiatric hospital. He pretends to be rehabilitated and is returned to the care of his mother.

On the evening of his return home, Charley's family discovers that he has secretly left the house. They contact Charley's psychiatrist and surmise that he has returned to the dollhouse. At the museum, Charley reveals his feelings for the doll.

The family, psychiatrist and museum guards search the museum for Charley but find nothing. However, one guard glances into the dollhouse and sees Charley, now a miniature figure, finally together with his love in the dollhouse. Smiling, the guard resolves to never reveal what he has witnessed, knowing no one would believe him.

== Closing narration ==
They never found Charley Parkes, because the guard didn't tell them what he saw in the glass case. He knew what they'd say and he knew they'd be right too, because seeing is not always believing, especially if what you see happens to be an odd corner of the Twilight Zone.

== Cast ==
- Robert Duvall as Charley Parkes
- Pert Kelton as Mrs. Parkes
- Barbara Barrie as Myra
- William Windom as Dr. Wallman
- John McLiam as Museum Guard
- Barney Phillips as Diemel
- Claire Griswold as The Doll (Alice)
- Lennie Weinrib as Buddy
- Joan Chambers as Harriet Gunderson
- Chet Stratton as Museum Guide
- Nina Roman as The Maid
- Richard Angarola as The Suitor
- Sally Kellerman as Office Worker

== Music ==
The musical score in the episode was created by American composer Fred Steiner. According to music professor Linda Ganus, Steiner "combined original and repurposed classical and jazz music both diegetically (as a plot element) and non-diegetically (the music/sound is not audible to the characters in the story, only to the viewers)." In this way, there is a dissonance between what the viewers and characters are seeing versus what they are hearing, "thus complicating the viewer’s own perceptions and making the story and its conclusion even more enigmatic and uncanny." The melody played by the Doll (Alice) is the first movement of Mozart’s Piano Sonata No. 11 in A Major. A slower version of this melody but played on a solo flute also introduces the episode. Other music played in the episode includes "La donna è mobile" from Verdi's Rigoletto heard during the pizza shop scene.

== Lawsuit ==
The "Miniature" episode was not included in the syndication package for The Twilight Zone because of a pending copyright lawsuit over an earlier script titled "The Thirteenth Mannequin" that had been submitted with allegedly the same concept. In 1967, the lawsuit was dismissed and judgement affirmed on appeal that there was no substantial similarity between the two scripts.

== Colorized version ==
The episode was included in the 1984 The Twilight Zone Silver Anniversary Special with the dollhouse scenes colorized in an early public demonstration of the film colorization process. The colorized scenes are included as a special feature on the DVD release; it was not, however, carried over to the Blu-ray release.
