= Francis H. Griswold =

United States Air Force general (1904–1989)

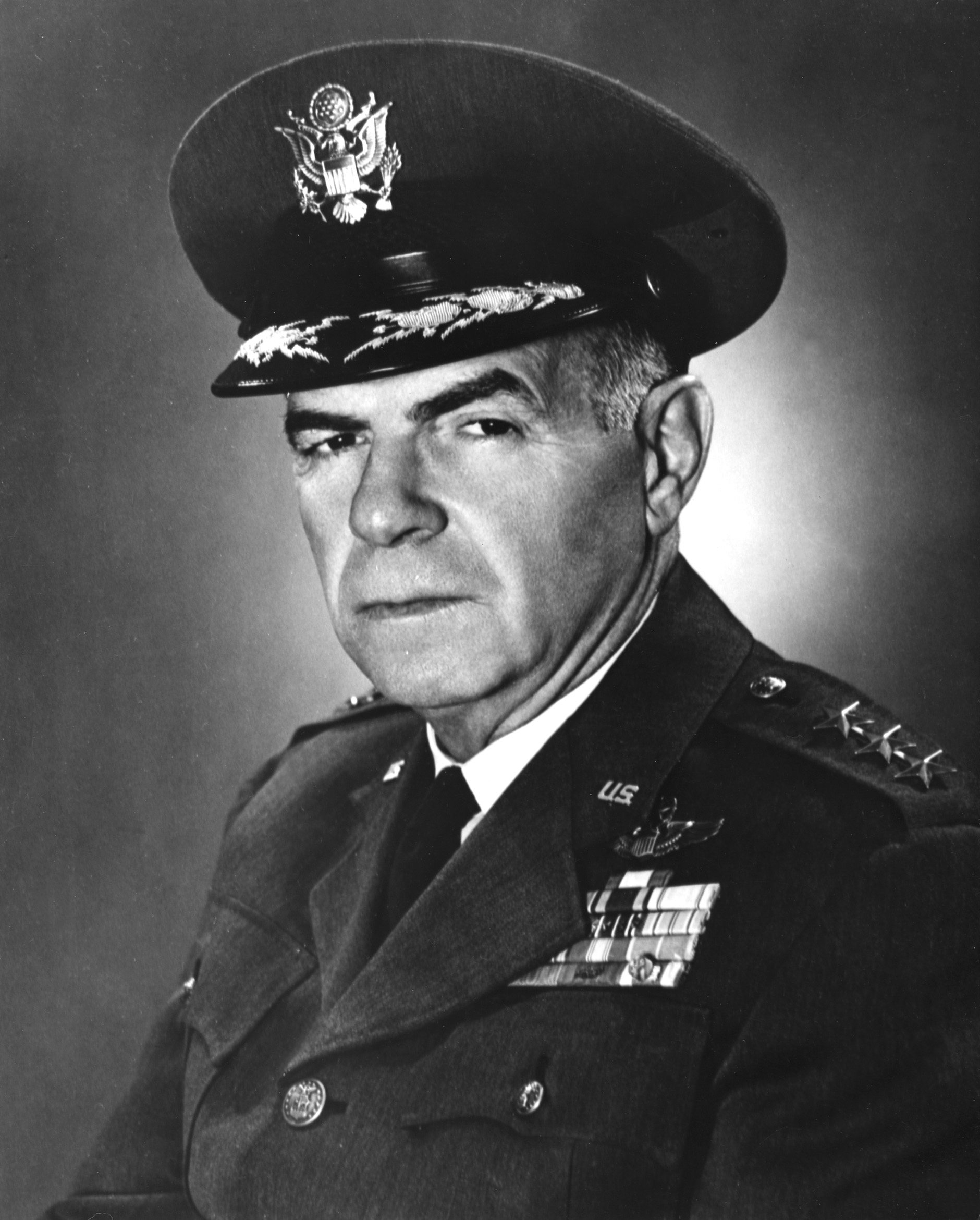
- Born: November 5, 1904; Erie, Pennsylvania
- Died: April 11, 1989 (aged 84); Laguna Hills, California
- Military career
- Allegiance: United States of America
- Branch: United States Air Force
- Service years: 1928–1964
- Rank: Lieutenant General
- Nickname: Butch
- Commands: Third Air Force; National War College; Vice CINC, SAC
- Conflicts: World War II
- Awards: Distinguished Service Medal (2); Legion of Merit (2); Air Medal

Francis Hopkinson Griswold (November 5, 1904 – April 11, 1989) was an American Air Force lieutenant general who was commandant of the National War College in Washington, D.C., and vice commander in chief, Strategic Air Command.

== Early life ==
Griswold was born in Erie, Pennsylvania, in 1904. He attended Columbia University in New York City and graduated from Ohio State University, Columbus, Ohio, before entering military service as an aviation cadet in September 1928. He completed flying training at Kelly Field, Texas, in October 1929.

He spent the next several years as a pilot performing normal squadron duties with various air units in Michigan, Illinois, Hawaii, California and Virginia. Griswold graduated from the Armament Course at the Air Corps Technical School in 1931 and the Air Corps Tactical School in 1939.

== World War II ==
Shortly after the U.S. entered World War II, he was named as chief of the Training Section, Headquarters Army Air Forces, Washington, D.C.

He was transferred in July 1943 to the Eighth Air Force in England where he served successively as chief of staff of the 8th Fighter Command, the 2nd Bomb Division, and the Eighth Air Force. He went to the Pacific in July 1945 as commanding general of the 301st Fighter Wing on Okinawa, and the following October returned to the United States.

== Cold War ==
portrait photograph of Griswold, circa 1953

From December 1945 until July 1946 he was deputy assistant chief of the Air Staff for operations, Headquarters Army Air Forces. He then assumed command of the 20th Air Force on Guam until September 1948 when he returned to Headquarters U.S. Air force as assistant deputy chief of staff for materiel.

He was named Air Force staff member of the Munitions Board in December 1950, and in April 1952 was reassigned to the United Kingdom to command the U.S. Third Air Force.

He became vice commander in chief of the Strategic Air Command (SAC) in April 1954, where he remained until July 1, 1961, when he was named commandant, the National War College, Washington, D.C.

== Retirement ==
He retired August 1, 1964.

Lieutenant General Griswold died of heart failure at Saddleback Community Hospital in Laguna Hills, California; he was 84 years old.

== Personal life ==
Griswold was married to the former Jeff Bradley Southerland. They had two daughters, one of whom was actress Claire Bradley Griswold.

== Awards and decorations ==
USAF Command Pilot wings

Army Distinguished Service Medal (w/oak leaf cluster)
Legion of Merit (w/oak leaf cluster)
Air Medal
American Defense Service Medal
American Campaign Medal
European-African-Middle Eastern Campaign Medal with four campaign stars
Asiatic-Pacific Campaign Medal
World War II Victory Medal
National Defense Service Medal with service star
Chevalier of the Legion of Honour
French Croix de guerre with Palm
Knight Commander of the Order of the British Empire
Order of Polonia Restituta
