= Phil Gordon (actor) =

American actor (1916–2010)

- Gordon in The Beverly Hillbillies (1962)
- Born: Phil Gulley; May 5, 1916; Meridian, Mississippi
- Died: June 15, 2010 (aged 94); Mobile, Alabama
- Occupation(s): Actor, dialect coach
- Spouse: Jane Dupree Gulley

Phil Gordon (May 5, 1916 – June 15, 2010) was an American actor and dialect coach, most known for his work in television. Gordon's work included roles on The Beverly Hillbillies (playing Jasper "Jazzbo" Depew), Green Acres, and Petticoat Junction.

Gordon was born Phil Gulley on May 5, 1916, in Meridian, Mississippi. His parents were Philomen and Lena Alexina Gulley. He enlisted in the United States Navy and the United Service Organizations (USO) during World War II. He worked as a jazz musician following the end of World War II, touring in Chicago and New Orleans during the 1940s and 1950s.

Gordon moved to California in the late 1950s, where he worked as an actor and dialect coach (for Green Acres) in television throughout the 1960s. He departed the television industry and moved to Mobile, Alabama with his wife Jane Dupree Gulley in the late 1970s. He resided in Mobile for the remainder of his life.

Phil Gordon died on June 15, 2010, in Mobile at the age of 94. He was interred at Pine Crest Cemetery in Mobile. His wife of more than 40 years predeceased him.

== Selected filmography ==
- Alfred Hitchcock Presents (1960) (Season 5 Episode 15: "Man from the South") as Bartender
- Alfred Hitchcock Presents (1960) (Season 6 Episode 5: "The Five-Forty-Eight") as Bartender
- Alfred Hitchcock Presents (1961) (Season 6 Episode 28: "Gratitude") as Frank the Bartender
