= The Twilight Zone (franchise) =

Media franchise based on an American television anthology series

- The Twilight Zone logo used in the original 1959 television series
- Created by: Rod Serling
- Original work: "The Time Element" (The Twilight Zone (1959 TV series))
- Owner: Skydance
- Years: 1959–present

Print publications
- Book: Twilight Zone: 19 Original Stories on the 50th Anniversary (2009)

Films and television
- Film: Twilight Zone: The Movie (1983)
- Television series: First series (1959–1964); Second series (1985–1989); Third series (2002–2003); Fourth series (2019–2020)
- Television film: Twilight Zone: Rod Serling's Lost Classics (1994)

Audio
- Radio program: The Twilight Zone radio dramas (2002–2012)
- Original music: Marius Constant (composer)

Miscellaneous
- Theme park attraction: The Twilight Zone Tower of Terror (1994–present)
- Pinball: Twilight Zone pinball machine (1993)

The Twilight Zone is an American media franchise based on the anthology television series created by Rod Serling in which characters find themselves dealing with often disturbing or unusual events, an experience described as entering "The Twilight Zone". The episodes are in various genres, including science fiction, fantasy, absurdism, dystopian fiction, suspense, horror, supernatural drama, black comedy, and psychological thriller, frequently concluding with a macabre or unexpected twist, and usually with a moral. A popular and critical success, it introduced many Americans to common science fiction and fantasy tropes. The first series, shot entirely in black-and-white, ran on CBS for five seasons from 1959 to 1964.

The Twilight Zone followed in the tradition of earlier television shows such as Tales of Tomorrow (1951–53), Out There (1951–1952) and Science Fiction Theatre (1955–57); radio programs such as The Weird Circle (1943–45), Dimension X (1950–51) and X Minus One (1955–58); and the radio work of one of Serling's inspirations, Norman Corwin. The success of the series led to a feature film (1983), a TV film (1994), a radio series (2002–12), various literature, theme park attractions and various other spin-offs that spanned five decades, including three revival television series. The second series (1985–1989) ran on CBS and in syndication in the 1980s, while the third series ran on UPN (2002–03). The fourth Twilight Zone series, helmed by Jordan Peele, was released on CBS All Access from 2019–20.

TV Guide ranked the original TV series #5 in their 2013 list of the 60 greatest shows of all time and #5 in their list of the 60 greatest dramas.

== Television history ==
Series	Season	Episodes	Originally released			Narrator
Series	Season	Episodes	First released	Last released	Network	Narrator
1959–1964 series	Concept		November 24, 1958		CBS	Rod Serling
1959–1964 series	1	36	October 2, 1959	July 1, 1960	CBS	Rod Serling
1959–1964 series	2	29	September 30, 1960	June 2, 1961	CBS	Rod Serling
1959–1964 series	3	37	September 15, 1961	June 1, 1962	CBS	Rod Serling
1959–1964 series	4	18	January 3, 1963	May 23, 1963	CBS	Rod Serling
1959–1964 series	5	36	September 27, 1963	June 19, 1964	CBS	Rod Serling
1985–1989 series	1	24	September 27, 1985	April 11, 1986	CBS	Charles Aidman
1985–1989 series	2	11	September 27, 1986	July 17, 1987	CBS	Charles Aidman
1985–1989 series	3	30	September 24, 1988	April 15, 1989	Syndication	Robin Ward
2002–2003 series	1	43	September 18, 2002	May 21, 2003	UPN	Forest Whitaker
2019–2020 series	1	10	April 1, 2019	May 30, 2019	Paramount+	Jordan Peele
2019–2020 series	2	10	June 25, 2020		Paramount+	Jordan Peele
Films
The Movie	Film		June 24, 1983		Theatrical release	Burgess Meredith
Rod Serling's Lost Classics	TV film		May 19, 1994		CBS	James Earl Jones

=== Background ===
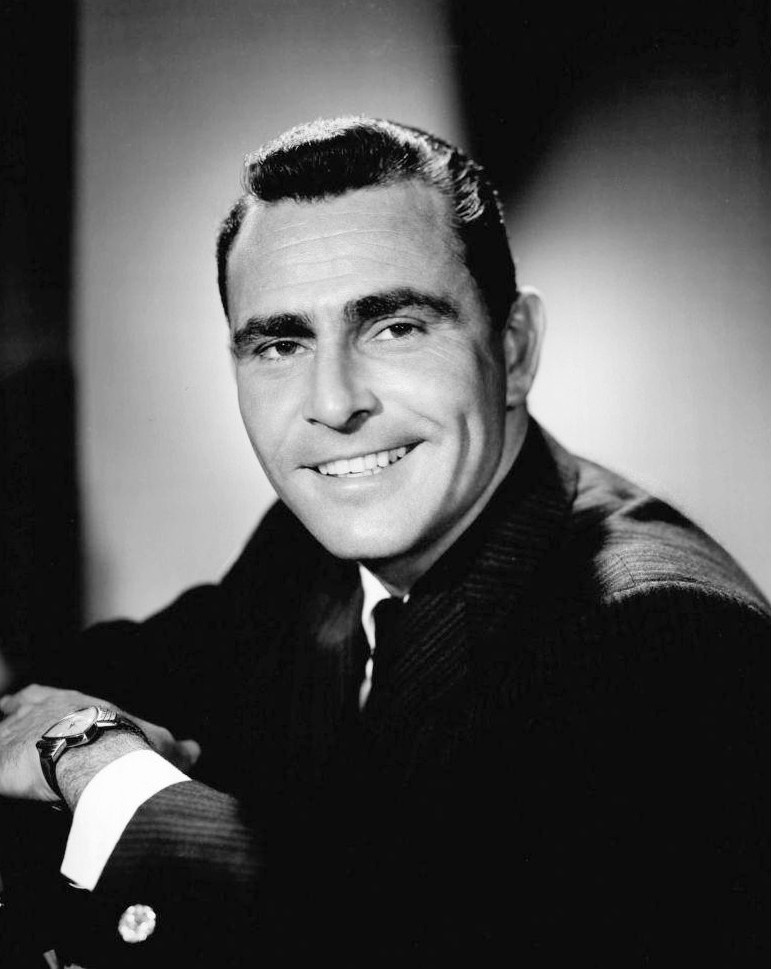
Rod Serling in 1959

As a boy, Rod Serling was a fan of pulp fiction stories. As an adult, he sought books with themes such as racism, government, war, society, and human nature in general. Serling decided to combine these interests to broach these subjects on television at a time when they were considered taboo.

Throughout the 1950s, Serling established himself as one of the most popular names in television. He was as famous for writing televised drama as he was for criticizing the medium's limitations. His most vocal complaints concerned censorship, which was frequently practiced by sponsors and networks. In a 1957 production for Studio One called "The Arena," Serling intended to explore contemporary politics. However, Serling said he "was not permitted to have [his] senators discuss any current or pressing problem." He explained that talking about tariffs would align him with Republicans, and talking about labor would associate him with Democrats. According to Serling, "To say a single thing germane to the current political scene was absolutely prohibited."

=== "The Time Element" (1958) ===
CBS purchased a teleplay in 1958 that writer Rod Serling hoped to produce as the pilot of a weekly anthology series. "The Time Element" marked Serling's first entry in the field of science fiction.

==== Plot ====
13 years after the end of World War II, a man named Peter Jenson (William Bendix) visits a psychoanalyst, Dr. Gillespie (Martin Balsam). Jenson tells him about a recurring dream in which he tries to warn people about the "sneak attack" on Pearl Harbor before it happens, but the warnings are disregarded. Jenson believes the dream's events are real and he travels back to 1941 each night. Dr. Gillespie insists that time travel is impossible given the nature of temporal paradoxes. While on the couch, Jenson falls asleep once again, but this time dreams that the Japanese planes shoot and kill him. In Dr. Gillespie's office, the couch on which Jenson was lying is now empty. Dr. Gillespie goes to a bar where he finds Jenson's picture on the wall. The bartender tells him that Jenson had tended bar there, but he was killed during the Pearl Harbor attack.

William Bendix and Martin Balsam in "The Time Element"

==== Production ====
With the "Time Element" script, Serling drafted the fundamental elements that defined the subsequent series: a science-fiction/fantasy theme, opening and closing narration, and an ending with a twist. "The Time Element" was purchased immediately but shelved indefinitely.

This is where things stood when Bert Granet, the new producer for Westinghouse Desilu Playhouse, discovered "The Time Element" in CBS' vaults while searching for an original Serling script to add prestige to his show. "The Time Element" (introduced by Desi Arnaz) debuted on November 24, 1958, to an overwhelmingly delighted audience of television viewers and critics alike. "The humor and sincerity of Mr. Serling's dialogue made 'The Time Element' consistently entertaining," offered Jack Gould of The New York Times. More than 6,000 letters of praise flooded Granet's offices. Convinced that a series based on such stories could succeed, CBS again began talks with Serling about the possibilities of producing The Twilight Zone. "Where Is Everybody?" was accepted as the pilot episode and the project was officially announced to the public in early 1959. Other than reruns at the time, "The Time Element" was not aired on television again until it was shown as part of a 1996 all-night sneak preview of the new cable channel TVLand. It is available in an Italian DVD boxed set titled Ai confini della realtà – I tesori perduti. The Twilight Zone Season 1 Blu-ray boxed set released on September 14, 2010, offers a remastered high-definition version of the original Desilu Playhouse production as a special feature. The program's supporting cast features Darryl Hickman, Jesse White, Bartlett Robinson and future Three Stooges member Joe DeRita.

=== First series (1959–1964) ===
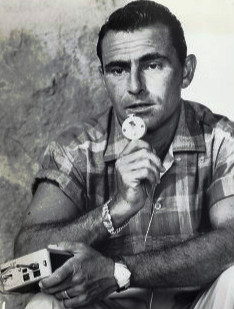
Rod Serling working on his script with a dictating machine, 1959

The series was produced by Cayuga Productions, Inc., a production company owned and named by Serling. It reflects his background in Central New York State and is named after Cayuga Lake, on which he owned a home, and where Cornell University and Ithaca College are located.

Aside from Serling, who wrote or adapted nearly two-thirds of the series' total episodes, writers for The Twilight Zone included leading authors such as Charles Beaumont, Ray Bradbury, Earl Hamner, Jr., George Clayton Johnson, Richard Matheson, Reginald Rose, and Jerry Sohl. Many episodes also featured new adaptations of stories by classic writers such as Ambrose Bierce and Lewis Padgett, and by contemporary writers such as Jerome Bixby, Damon Knight, and John Collier.

Twilight Zone's writers frequently used science fiction as a vehicle for social comment, as networks and sponsors who censored controversial material from live dramas were less concerned with seemingly innocuous fantasy and sci-fi stories. Frequent themes on The Twilight Zone included nuclear war, McCarthyism, and mass hysteria, subjects that were avoided on less serious primetime television. Episodes such as "The Monsters Are Due on Maple Street" and "I Am the Night—Color Me Black" offered specific commentary on current events and social issues. Other stories, such as "The Masks", "I Dream of Genie", or "Mr. Denton on Doomsday" were allegories, parables, or fables that reflected the moral and philosophical choices of the characters.

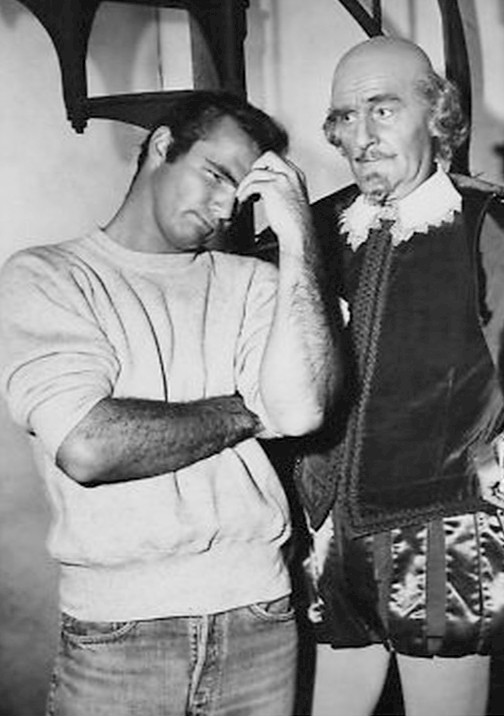
John Williams as William Shakespeare in "The Bard" featuring Burt Reynolds parodying look-alike Marlon Brando

Despite his esteem in the writing community, Serling found the series difficult to sell. Few critics felt that science fiction could transcend empty escapism and enter the realm of adult drama. In a September 22, 1959, interview with Serling, Mike Wallace asked a question illustrative of the times: "...[Y]ou're going to be, obviously, working so hard on The Twilight Zone that, in essence, for the time being and for the foreseeable future, you've given up on writing anything important for television, right?" While Serling's appearances on the show became one of its most distinctive features, with his clipped delivery still widely imitated today, he was reportedly nervous about it and had to be persuaded to appear on camera. Serling often appeared in medias res with the characters remaining oblivious to him, with one notable exception: In "A World of His Own", a writer (Keenan Wynn) with the ability to make characters appear and disappear protests Serling's narration and promptly erases Serling from the show.

In season two, due to budgetary constraints, the network decided – against Serling's wishes – to cut costs by shooting some episodes on videotape rather than film. The requisite multicamera setup of the videotape format precluded location shooting, severely limiting the potential scope of the storylines, and the experiment was abandoned after just six episodes ("Twenty Two", "Static", "The Whole Truth", "The Lateness of the Hour", "The Night of the Meek", and "Long Distance Call").

The first series contains 156 episodes. The episodes in seasons one through three are 30 minutes long with commercials (24 or 25 minutes without commercials). Season four (1962–63) consists of one-hour episodes with commercials (51 minutes without commercials). Season five returned to the half-hour format.

=== Second series (1985–1989) ===
It was Serling's decision to sell his share of the series back to the network that eventually allowed for a Twilight Zone revival. As an in-house production, CBS stood to earn more money producing The Twilight Zone than it could by purchasing a new series produced by an outside company. Even so, the network was slow to consider a revival, turning down offers from the original production team of Rod Serling and Buck Houghton and later from American filmmaker Francis Ford Coppola.

CBS gave the new Twilight Zone a greenlight in 1984 under the supervision of Carla Singer, then Vice President of Drama Development. While the show did not come close to matching the enduring popularity of the original, some episodes – particularly Alan Brennert's love story "Her Pilgrim Soul" and J. Neil Schulman's "Profile in Silver" – were critically acclaimed. In a tribute to the first series, the opening credits include a brief image of Rod Serling. Four episodes are remakes of those from the first series: "Night of the Meek", "Shadow Play", "The After Hours" and "A Game of Pool", while "Dead Woman's Shoes" is an adaptation of "Dead Man's Shoes". Unlike the first, third and fourth series, this version does not include the opening monologue during the title sequence. As well, the narration is all strictly voice-over and the narrator never appears on-screen.

=== Rod Serling's Lost Classics (1994) ===
In the early 1990s, Richard Matheson and Carol Serling produced an outline for a two-hour made-for-TV movie which would feature Matheson adaptations of three yet-unfilmed Rod Serling short stories. Outlines for such a production were rejected by CBS until early 1994, when Serling's widow discovered a complete shooting script ("Where the Dead Are") authored by her late husband, while rummaging through their garage. She showed the forgotten script to producers Michael O'Hara and Laurence Horowitz, who were significantly impressed by it. "I had a pile of scripts, which I usually procrastinate about reading. But I read this one right away and, after 30 pages, called my partner and said, "I love it," recalled O'Hara. "This is pure imagination, a period piece, literate – some might say wordy. If Rod Serling's name weren't on it, it wouldn't have a chance at getting made."

Eager to capitalize on Serling's celebrity status as a writer, CBS packaged "Where the Dead Are" with Matheson's adaptation of "The Theatre", debuting as a two-hour feature on the night of May 19, 1994, under the name Twilight Zone: Rod Serling's Lost Classics. The title represents a misnomer, as both stories were conceived long after Twilight Zone's cancellation. Written just months before Serling's death, "Where the Dead Are" starred Patrick Bergin as a 19th-century doctor who stumbles upon a mad scientist's medical experiments with immortality. "The Theatre" starred Amy Irving and Gary Cole as a couple who visits a cineplex where they discover the feature presentation depicts their own lives. James Earl Jones provided opening and closing narrations.

Critical response was mixed. Gannett News Service described it as "taut and stylish, a reminder of what can happen when fine actors are given great words." USA Today was less impressed, even suggesting that Carol Serling "should have left these two unproduced mediocrities in the garage where she found them." Ultimately, ratings proved insufficient to justify a proposed sequel featuring three scripts adapted by Matheson.

=== Third series (2002–2003) ===
A third series was developed by UPN in 2002; it was hosted by Forest Whitaker. It was broadcast in a one-hour format composed of two half-hour stories, it was canceled after one season. "It's Still a Good Life" is a sequel to "It's a Good Life", "The Monsters Are on Maple Street" is an adaptation of "The Monsters Are Due on Maple Street" and "Eye of the Beholder" is a remake of an episode from the first series, with Serling still credited as writer.

=== Fourth series (2019–2020) ===
In December 2012, it was reported that Bryan Singer was developing and executive producing a fourth television series for CBS Television Studios. A writer for the series was not chosen and the program was not pitched to any networks. CBS, which broadcast the first series and second series, was reportedly interested. In February 2013, Singer told TG Daily that the project was still in development and that he hoped to direct the pilot and have A-list actors appear on the revival. The following month, he told IGN that a writer with whom he had previously worked was in negotiations to join the revival and that he felt "passionate" towards the first series and the planned revival.

In February 2016, it was reported that Ken Levine would write and direct the pilot episode of the revival series. It was also reported that the series would be interactive. In November 2017, it was reported that Jordan Peele was developing a reboot of the series for streaming service CBS All Access with Marco Ramirez serving as potential showrunner. In December 2017, CBS All Access ordered the fourth The Twilight Zone series to series. It was announced that the series would be produced by CBS Television Studios in association with Monkeypaw Productions and Genre Films. Jordan Peele, Marco Ramirez, and Simon Kinberg will serve as executive producers for the series and collaborate on the premiere episode. Win Rosenfeld and Audrey Chon will also serve as executive producers. Peele was revealed to be the new host and narrator in September 2018, and the new opening sequence was released. The series premiered on April 1, 2019.

The season 1 episode "Nightmare at 30,000 Feet" is based on the first series' season 5 episode "Nightmare at 20,000 Feet". The season 2 episode "You Might Also Like" features the Kanamits, who first appeared in the first series' season 3 episode "To Serve Man". On February 24, 2021, CBS All Access canceled the series after two seasons.

== Other media ==
=== Film ===
Twilight Zone: The Movie is a 1983 feature film produced by Steven Spielberg and John Landis. It starred Dan Aykroyd, Albert Brooks, John Lithgow, Vic Morrow and Scatman Crothers. The film remade three classic episodes of the first series and included one original story. Landis directed the prologue and the first segment ("Time Out"), Spielberg directed the second ("Kick the Can"), Joe Dante the third ("It's a Good Life"), and George Miller directed the fourth ("Nightmare at 20,000 Feet"). Landis's segment became notorious for a helicopter accident during filming that caused the deaths of Morrow and two child actors.

==== Potential film ====
Leonardo DiCaprio is planning to make a new film with Warner Bros., citing The Twilight Zone as his favorite TV series. Unlike the first film, which was an anthology feature, it will be a big-budget, SFX-laden continuous story possibly based on classic episodes of the series such as "Eye of the Beholder", "To Serve Man", or any of the 92 scripts written by Rod Serling, to which Warner Bros. owns the rights. One plot leaked from the script tells about a pilot who time-travels 96 years into the future. Cloverfield director Matt Reeves was signed in 2011 to direct the movie, but left in 2012 to direct Dawn of the Planet of the Apes. On August 16, 2013, Joseph Kosinski was announced to direct. The studio hired Aron Eli Coleite to pen the screenplay for the film and will not be an anthology but use various elements from the Twilight Zone universe. In June 2017, Christine Lavaf was hired to write the script. In June 2025 it was reported that Severance Director Ben Stiller was attached to direct the film adaptation after reportedly quietly developing the project over the last 6 months with DiCaprio still attached.

=== Games ===
In 1964, Ideal released a board game, The Twilight Zone Game, at the height of the show's popularity. The game consisted of a cardboard playing surface, four colored playing pieces, a colored spinning wheel, and 12 "door" playing cards. In 1988, Gigabit Systems, Inc. published a text adventure video game for Amiga and the PC. In March 1992, Midway Games released a wide-body pinball game, Twilight Zone, based on the original TV series, as a Bally title. Conceived by Pat Lawlor, it uses Golden Earring's hit song "Twilight Zone" (1982) as its theme song. The game sold 15,235 units. It is often regarded as one of the greatest pinball machines of all time. On September 17, 2014, Legacy Interactive and Spark Plug Games released a casual adventure game based on The Twilight Zone. On July 14, 2022, Fun Train and Pocket Money Games released a Virtual Reality game based on The Twilight Zone for Meta Quest 2 titled Twilight Zone VR.

=== Literature ===
Serling novelized several of his original scripts, which were published in the anthologies Stories from the Twilight Zone (1960), More Stories from the Twilight Zone (1961) and New Stories from the Twilight Zone (1962); these have all been reprinted several times, including in an omnibus, The Twilight Zone: Complete Stories (1980). In 1995, DAW Books published the anthology books Journeys to the Twilight Zone (16 stories edited by Carol Serling including Rod Serling's "Suggestion"), Return to the Twilight Zone (18 stories edited by Carol Serling including Rod Serling's "The Sole Survivor"), and Adventures in the Twilight Zone (24 stories edited by Carol Serling including Rod Serling's "Lindemann's Catch"). In September 2009, Tor Books published Twilight Zone: 19 Original Stories on the 50th Anniversary, to mark the 50th anniversary of the series. It contains stories by 20 authors such as R. L. Stine and Timothy Zahn, and an introduction by Carol Serling.

==== Comic books ====
Western Publishing published a Twilight Zone comic book, first providing content under contract to publisher Dell Comics for four issues, one in 1961 and three further issues in 1962, with the first two published as part of their long-running Four Color anthology series as issue numbers 1173 and 1288, and then two further one-shots numbered separately in Dell's unique fashion as 01-860-207 and 12-860-210 (numbered as 01-860-210 on the inside) respectively. Western then restarted the series under its own Gold Key imprint with a formal issue No. 1, which ran 92 issues from 1962 to 1979, with the final issue being published in 1982. Several of the stories were reprinted in their Mystery Comics Digest, which mentioned the title on the covers. A wide range of artists worked on the title, including Jack Sparling, Reed Crandall, Lee Elias, George Evans, Russ Jones, Joe Orlando, Jerry Robinson, Mike Sekowsky, Dan Spiegle, Frank Thorne, and Alex Toth. The first published comic book work of artist Frank Miller appeared in issue 84 (June 1978). In 1990, NOW Comics published a single issue of a new series using the title logo from the 1985 revival, featuring an adaptation of Harlan Ellison's story "Crazy as a Soup Sandwich". The issue was reprinted as Twilight Zones Premiere in 1991, followed by an eleven-issue second volume (1991–1992) and a four-issue third volume (1993), as well as an annual and a 3-D special in 1993.

In 2008, students at the Savannah College of Art and Design partnered with Walker & Co. to create graphic novels based on eight episodes of the series through 2009. The first four, "Walking Distance", "The After Hours", "The Monsters Are Due on Maple Street", and "The Odyssey of Flight 33", were released in December 2011. The other four were "The Midnight Sun", "Deaths-Head Revisited", "The Big Tall Wish" and "Will the Real Martian Please Stand Up?" Comics publisher Dynamite Entertainment ran a multiple-issue series, written by J. Michael Straczynski and with art by Guiu Vilanova, beginning in December 2013.

=== Music ===
==== Television series ====
- Marius Constant composed the theme used for the series from the second season onward. This replaced Bernard Herrmann's theme for the first season, though Constant's theme is more associated with the recognizable sound of The Twilight Zone and most of its incarnations. The guitar part was performed by jazz guitarist and session musician Howard Roberts on a 1952 Fender Telecaster. Other music contributors for the original television show are Jerry Goldsmith, Leonard Rosenman, Nathan Scott, Fred Steiner, Nathan Van Cleave, René Garriguenc and Franz Waxman.
- The Grateful Dead performed the theme for the 1985 revival series.
- Jonathan Davis of Korn composed the theme music for the 2002 revival series.
- Marco Beltrami and Brandon Roberts composed the music for the 2019 revival.

==== Film ====
- Jerry Goldsmith composed the music for Twilight Zone: The Movie (1983).

==== Influence in popular music ====
Michael Jackson used samples from The Twilight Zone in his songs "The Lost Children" and "Threatened" from the 2001 album Invincible.

The Marketts' biggest hit, "Out of Limits", originally entitled "Outer Limits", was named after the 1963 TV series The Outer Limits. Rod Serling sued the Marketts for quoting the four-note motif from The Twilight Zone, without his approval, which resulted in the change of the title to "Out of Limits". It reached number 3 on the Billboard Hot 100 chart in 1964. It sold over one million copies, and was awarded a gold disc.

Many other musicians have written and performed music based on The Twilight Zone, including: 2 Unlimited ("Twilight Zone"), Anthrax ("Intro to Reality"), Average White Band, John Cale, Dr. John, David Dubowski ("To Serve Man"), Golden Earring ("Twilight Zone"), Michael Hurley, Tech N9ne, Iron Maiden ("Twilight Zone"), Mekong Delta ("Twilight Zone"), Van Morrison ("Twilight Zone"), Rush ("The Twilight Zone"), Raymond Scott, Sly & Robbie, Magneto Dayo, The Manhattan Transfer ("Twilight Zone/Twilight Tone"), The Residents, The Ventures ("Twilight Zone"), Panic! at the Disco Ariana Grande ("Twilight Zone") and John Williams.

=== Radio ===
Beginning in 2002, episodes of the original The Twilight Zone were adapted for radio, with Stacy Keach taking Serling's role as narrator and produced by Carl Amari of Falcon Picture Group. Each episode features a current Hollywood celebrity, including Jason Alexander, Blair Underwood, Lou Gossett, Jr., Michael York, Jim Caviezel, Jane Seymour, Don Johnson, Sean Astin, Luke Perry and others in the title roles. The series is broadcast on hundreds of radio stations from coast to coast and over Sirius/XM. The station list and episodes for download, including 3 Free episodes are available at the official website at www.twilightzoneradio.com

=== Scripts ===
Beginning in 2001, Gauntlet Press began publishing collections of original scripts from The Twilight Zone by Charles Beaumont, Richard Matheson, and Rod Serling. A ten-volume signed, limited edition series of all 92 of Rod Serling's scripts, authorized by his wife, Carol Serling, began yearly publication in 2004. Many of the scripts contain handwritten edits by Serling himself and differ in significant ways from the aired versions; most volumes contain an alternate version of a selected script. The script for "The Monsters Are Due on Maple Street" has been published into 7th grade reading books in the form of a play.

=== Stage productions ===
Live theatre productions of the original episodes can be seen in Los Angeles and Seattle, where Theater Schmeater has continuously produced a late-night series, "The Twilight Zone – Live" with permission of the Serling estate, since 1996. In 2009, Masquerade, A Chennai based theater group produced 'Dystopia', loosely based on the episodes "The Obsolete Man" and "Five Characters in Search of an Exit". In 2011, the Penn State University theatre group, No Refund Theatre, produced a stage adaptation of The Twilight Zone. It included the episodes "The Eye of the Beholder", "The Midnight Sun", and "Nothing in the Dark". It was directed by Anthony Arbaiza.

In 2017, Bethesda-Chevy Chase High School produced a live adaptation directed by Adam Graham with permission from CBS, with two shows containing four episodes each. These episodes included "Will The Real Martian Please Stand Up?" and "The Monsters Are Due On Maple Street." as well as more technically challenging episodes such as "Penny For Your Thoughts" and "The Eye of the Beholder."

In December 2017 the Almeida Theatre in London are staging the World Premiere production of 'The Twilight Zone'. Adapted by Anne Washburn and directed by Laurence Olivier Award winner Richard Jones, and will be based on stories from the first series by Rod Serling, Charles Beaumont and Richard Matheson.

=== Theme park attraction ===
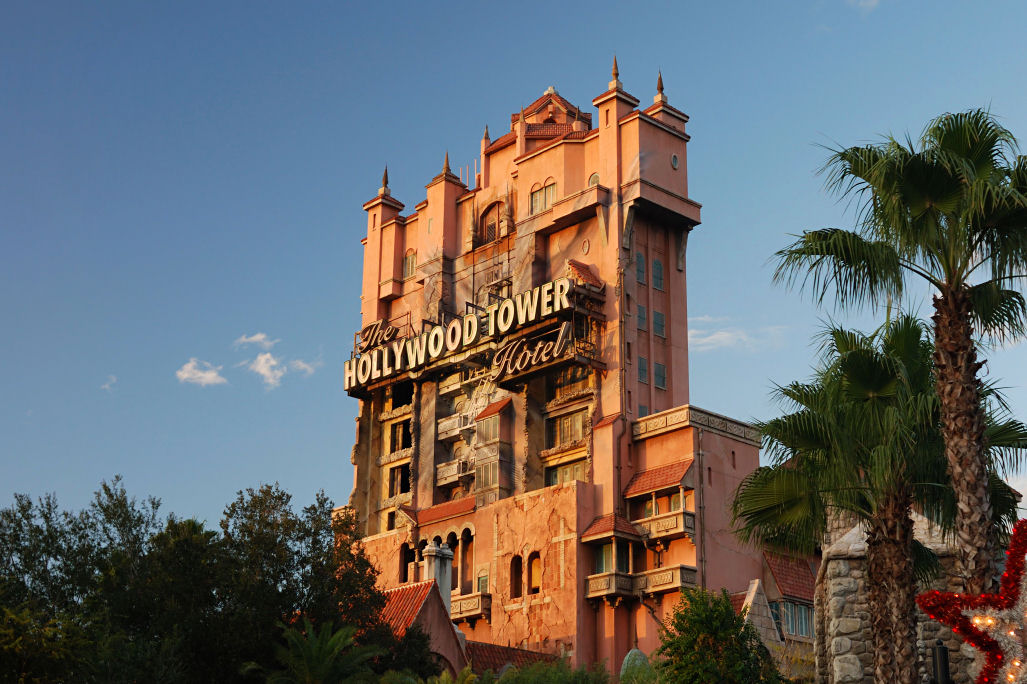
The Twilight Zone Tower of Terror at Disney's Hollywood Studios

The Twilight Zone Tower of Terror is a theme park attraction based on the original Twilight Zone series. Designed by Walt Disney Imagineering, the attraction is present at Disney's Hollywood Studios in Walt Disney World near Orlando and Disney Adventure World in Disneyland Paris. A third attraction at Disney California Adventure operated from 2004 to 2017 before being re-themed to Guardians of the Galaxy – Mission: Breakout!. A fourth incarnation of the attraction, known simply as Tower of Terror, also exists at Tokyo DisneySea in Japan, but it not themed to The Twilight Zone, due to cultural differences and constraints in licensing for the Oriental Land Company, owner and operator of the Tokyo parks. The ride also served as the inspiration for the 1997 TV film Tower of Terror, which bears no connection to The Twilight Zone.

=== Syndication ===
The Twilight Zone first series is currently in syndication on MeTV Network and Syfy, and the 2002 revival is syndicated on the El Rey Network.

== See also ==
- Science fiction on television

== Bibliography ==
- Albarella, Tony, ed. As Timeless as Infinity: The Complete Twilight Zone Scripts of Rod Serling. Colorado Springs, CO: Gauntlet Press.
- *Vol. 1 (2004). ISBN 978-1-887368-71-1.
- *Vol. 2 (2005). ISBN 978-1-887368-76-6.
- *Vol. 3 (2006). ISBN 978-1-887368-82-7.
- *Vol. 4 (2007). ISBN 978-1-887368-92-6.
- *Vol. 5 (2008). ISBN 978-1-934267-00-4.
- *Vol. 6 (2009). ISBN 978-1-934267-06-6.
- *Vol. 7 (2010). ISBN 978-1-934267-15-8.
- Anker, Roger, ed. (2004). The Twilight Zone Scripts of Charles Beaumont, Vol. 1. Colorado Springs, CO: Gauntlet Press. ISBN 978-1-887368-73-5.
- DeVoe, Bill. (2008). Trivia from The Twilight Zone. Albany, GA: Bear Manor Media. ISBN 978-1-59393-136-0.
- Grams, Martin. (2008). The Twilight Zone: Unlocking the Door to a Television Classic. Churchville, MD: OTR Publishing. ISBN 978-0-9703310-9-0.
- Presnell, Don and Marty McGee. (2008). A Critical History of Television's The Twilight Zone, 1959–1964. Jefferson, NC: McFarland. ISBN 978-0-7864-3886-0
- Stanyard, Stewart T. (2007). Dimensions Behind the Twilight Zone: A Backstage Tribute to Television's Groundbreaking Series. Ecw Press. ISBN 978-1-55022-744-4.
- Wiater, Stanley, ed. (2001). Richard Matheson's The Twilight Zone Scripts, Vol. 1. Colorado Springs, CO: Gauntlet Press. ISBN 978-1-887368-42-1.
- Wiater, Stanley, ed. (2002). Richard Matheson's The Twilight Zone Scripts, Vol. 2. Colorado Springs, CO: Gauntlet Press. ISBN 978-1-887368-52-0.
- Zicree, Marc Scott (1982). The Twilight Zone Companion. First Edition, Bantam Books. ISBN 978-0-553-01416-7. Second Edition (1992). Silman-James Press; ISBN 978-1-879505-09-4.
