= List of The Twilight Zone episodes =

Title card.

The original incarnation of The Twilight Zone anthology series began on October 2, 1959, and ended on June 19, 1964, with five seasons and 156 episodes. It was created by Rod Serling and broadcast on CBS.

Ongoing popularity of the series brought about a 1983 feature film and three "revival" television series in 1985, 2002, and 2019, though none reached the same level of critical and commercial success as the original run.

== Series overview ==
Season	Episodes	Originally released	
Season	Episodes	First released	Last released
Concept		November 24, 1958	
1	36	October 2, 1959	July 1, 1960
2	29	September 30, 1960	June 2, 1961
3	37	September 15, 1961	June 1, 1962
4	18	January 3, 1963	May 23, 1963
5	36	September 27, 1963	June 19, 1964

== Episodes ==
=== Concept (1958) ===
Rod Serling wrote a teleplay intending for it to be the pilot episode of a new series called The Twilight Zone. Although it ended up airing on a different show, Westinghouse Desilu Playhouse, it is considered the seed episode and has even been adapted as one of The Twilight Zone radio-show episodes.

Title	Directed by	Written by	Original air date
"The Time Element"	Allen Reisner	Rod Serling	November 24, 1958
A man (William Bendix) visits a psychoanalyst (Martin Balsam), complaining about a recurring dream in which he imagines waking up in Honolulu just prior to the attack on Pearl Harbor, which takes a major psychological toll.

=== Pilot (1959) ===
The pilot episode for the series was called "Where is Everybody?" The episode was reformatted when included in the series. It differs from the broadcast episode in only minor ways.

=== Season 1 (1959–1960) ===
Note: Episode titles were not shown on screen, but were announced by Serling at the end of the preceding week's episode. "Where is Everybody?" is an exception, as it was the first episode. Serling's promotional announcements were stripped from syndicated versions of season one, but restored (often only in audio form) on the Image Entertainment DVD releases. They have since been fully restored on the Blu-ray releases.

No. overall	No. in season	Title	Directed by	Written by	Music by	Original release date	Prod. code
1	1	"Where Is Everybody?"	Robert Stevens	Rod Serling	Bernard Herrmann	October 2, 1959	173-3601
2	2	"One for the Angels"	Robert Parrish	Rod Serling	N/A	October 9, 1959	173-3608
3	3	"Mr. Denton on Doomsday"	Allen Reisner	Rod Serling	N/A	October 16, 1959	173-3609
4	4	"The Sixteen-Millimeter Shrine"	Mitchell Leisen	Rod Serling	Franz Waxman	October 23, 1959	173-3610
5	5	"Walking Distance"	Robert Stevens	Rod Serling	Bernard Herrmann	October 30, 1959	173-3605
6	6	"Escape Clause"	Mitchell Leisen	Rod Serling	N/A	November 6, 1959	173-3603
7	7	"The Lonely"	Jack Smight	Rod Serling	Bernard Herrmann	November 13, 1959	173-3602
8	8	"Time Enough at Last"	John Brahm	Based on a short story by : Lynn Venable; Teleplay by : Rod Serling	Leith Stevens	November 20, 1959	173-3614
9	9	"Perchance to Dream"	Robert Florey	Charles Beaumont	Van Cleave	November 27, 1959	173-3616
10	10	"Judgment Night"	John Brahm	Rod Serling	N/A	December 4, 1959	173-3604
11	11	"And When the Sky Was Opened"	Douglas Heyes	Based on a short story by : Richard Matheson; Teleplay by : Rod Serling	Leonard Rosenman	December 11, 1959	173-3611
12	12	"What You Need"	Alvin Ganzer	Based on a short story by : Lewis Padgett; Teleplay by : Rod Serling	Van Cleave	December 25, 1959	173-3622
13	13	"The Four of Us Are Dying"	John Brahm	Based on a short story by : George Clayton Johnson; Teleplay by : Rod Serling	Jerry Goldsmith	January 1, 1960	173-3618
14	14	"Third from the Sun"	Richard L. Bare	Based on a short story by : Richard Matheson; Teleplay by : Rod Serling	N/A	January 8, 1960	173-3615
15	15	"I Shot an Arrow into the Air"	Stuart Rosenberg	Based on a story by : Madelon Champion; Teleplay by : Rod Serling	N/A	January 15, 1960	173-3626
16	16	"The Hitch-Hiker"	Alvin Ganzer	Based on the radio play by : Lucille Fletcher; Teleplay by : Rod Serling	N/A	January 22, 1960	173-3612
17	17	"The Fever"	Robert Florey	Rod Serling	N/A	January 29, 1960	173-3627
18	18	"The Last Flight"	William F. Claxton	Richard Matheson	N/A	February 5, 1960	173-3607
19	19	"The Purple Testament"	Richard L. Bare	Rod Serling	Lucien Moraweck	February 12, 1960	173-3619
20	20	"Elegy"	Douglas Heyes	Charles Beaumont	Van Cleave	February 19, 1960	173-3625
21	21	"Mirror Image"	John Brahm	Rod Serling	N/A	February 26, 1960	173-3623
22	22	"The Monsters Are Due on Maple Street"	Ronald Winston	Rod Serling	Rene Garriguenc	March 4, 1960	173-3620
23	23	"A World of Difference"	Ted Post	Richard Matheson	Van Cleave	March 11, 1960	173-3624
24	24	"Long Live Walter Jameson"	Anton Leader	Charles Beaumont	N/A	March 18, 1960	173-3621
25	25	"People Are Alike All Over"	Mitchell Leisen	Based on a short story by : Paul W. Fairman; Teleplay by : Rod Serling	N/A	March 25, 1960	173-3613
26	26	"Execution"	David Orrick McDearmon	Based on a short story by : George Clayton Johnson; Teleplay by : Rod Serling	N/A	April 1, 1960	173-3628
27	27	"The Big Tall Wish"	Ronald Winston	Rod Serling	Jerry Goldsmith	April 8, 1960	173-3630
28	28	"A Nice Place to Visit"	John Brahm	Charles Beaumont	N/A	April 15, 1960	173-3632
29	29	"Nightmare as a Child"	Alvin Ganzer	Rod Serling	Jerry Goldsmith	April 29, 1960	173-3635
30	30	"A Stop at Willoughby"	Robert Parrish	Rod Serling	Nathan Scott	May 6, 1960	173-3629
31	31	"The Chaser"	Douglas Heyes	Based on a short story by : John Collier; Teleplay by : Robert Presnell, Jr.	N/A	May 13, 1960	173-3636
32	32	"A Passage for Trumpet"	Don Medford	Rod Serling	Lyn Murray	May 20, 1960	173-3633
33	33	"Mr. Bevis"	William Asher	Rod Serling	N/A	June 3, 1960	173-3631
34	34	"The After Hours"	Douglas Heyes	Rod Serling	N/A	June 10, 1960	173-3637
35	35	"The Mighty Casey"	Alvin Ganzer; Robert Parrish	Rod Serling	N/A	June 17, 1960	173-3617
36	36	"A World of His Own"	Ralph Nelson	Richard Matheson	N/A	July 1, 1960	173-3634

=== Season 2 (1960–1961) ===
Unlike season 1, episode titles were shown on screen during the end credits.

Six consecutive episodes of this season were recorded on videotape (not on film as were all other episodes) at CBS Television City, as a cost-cutting measure mandated by CBS programming head James T. Aubrey. They are "The Lateness of the Hour", "The Night of the Meek", "The Whole Truth", "Twenty Two", "Static", and "Long Distance Call". These have a visual appearance which is distinctly different from those of episodes shot on film. In addition, videotape was a relatively primitive medium in the early 1960s; the editing of tape was next to impossible. Each of the episodes was therefore "camera-cut" as in live TV—on a studio sound stage, using a total of four cameras. The requisite multi-camera setup of the videotape experiment made location shooting difficult, severely limiting the potential scope of the storylines, so the short-lived experiment was abandoned.

"A Most Unusual Camera" was produced for season one, but it ended up in season two for unknown reasons.

No. overall	No. in season	Title	Directed by	Written by	Music by	Original release date	Prod. code
37	1	"King Nine Will Not Return"	Buzz Kulik	Rod Serling	Fred Steiner	September 30, 1960	173-3639
38	2	"The Man in the Bottle"	Don Medford	Rod Serling	N/A	October 7, 1960	173-3638
39	3	"Nervous Man in a Four Dollar Room"	Douglas Heyes	Rod Serling	Jerry Goldsmith	October 14, 1960	173-3641
40	4	"A Thing About Machines"	David Orrick McDearmon	Rod Serling	N/A	October 28, 1960	173-3645
41	5	"The Howling Man"	Douglas Heyes	Charles Beaumont	N/A	November 4, 1960	173-3642
42	6	"Eye of the Beholder" "The Private World of Darkness"	Douglas Heyes	Rod Serling	Bernard Herrmann	November 11, 1960	173-3640
43	7	"Nick of Time"	Richard L. Bare	Richard Matheson	N/A	November 18, 1960	173-3643
44	8	"The Lateness of the Hour"	Jack Smight	Rod Serling	N/A	December 2, 1960	N/A
45	9	"The Trouble with Templeton"	Buzz Kulik	E. Jack Neuman	Jeff Alexander	December 9, 1960	173-3649
46	10	"A Most Unusual Camera"	John Rich	Rod Serling	N/A	December 16, 1960	173-3606
47	11	"The Night of the Meek"	Jack Smight	Rod Serling	N/A	December 23, 1960	N/A
48	12	"Dust"	Douglas Heyes	Rod Serling	Jerry Goldsmith	January 6, 1961	173-3653
49	13	"Back There"	David Orrick McDearmon	Rod Serling	Jerry Goldsmith	January 13, 1961	173-3648
50	14	"The Whole Truth"	James Sheldon	Rod Serling	N/A	January 20, 1961	N/A
51	15	"The Invaders"	Douglas Heyes	Richard Matheson	Jerry Goldsmith	January 27, 1961	173-3646
52	16	"A Penny for Your Thoughts"	James Sheldon	George Clayton Johnson	N/A	February 3, 1961	173-3650
53	17	"Twenty Two"	Jack Smight	Based on an anecdote by : Bennett Cerf; Teleplay by : Rod Serling	N/A	February 10, 1961	N/A
54	18	"The Odyssey of Flight 33"	Jus Addiss	Rod Serling	N/A	February 24, 1961	173-3651
55	19	"Mr. Dingle, the Strong"	John Brahm	Rod Serling	N/A	March 3, 1961	173-3644
56	20	"Static"	Buzz Kulik	Based on a story by : OCee Ritch; Teleplay by : Charles Beaumont	N/A	March 10, 1961	N/A
57	21	"The Prime Mover"	Richard L. Bare	Charles Beaumont	N/A	March 24, 1961	173-3647
58	22	"Long Distance Call"	James Sheldon	Charles Beaumont and William Idelson	N/A	March 31, 1961	N/A
59	23	"A Hundred Yards Over the Rim"	Buzz Kulik	Rod Serling	Fred Steiner	April 7, 1961	3654
60	24	"The Rip Van Winkle Caper"	Jus Addiss	Rod Serling	N/A	April 21, 1961	3655
61	25	"The Silence"	Boris Sagal	Rod Serling	N/A	April 28, 1961	3658
62	26	"Shadow Play"	John Brahm	Charles Beaumont	N/A	May 5, 1961	3657
63	27	"The Mind and the Matter"	Buzz Kulik	Rod Serling	N/A	May 12, 1961	3659
64	28	"Will the Real Martian Please Stand Up?"	Montgomery Pittman	Rod Serling	N/A	May 26, 1961	3660
65	29	"The Obsolete Man"	Elliot Silverstein	Rod Serling	N/A	June 2, 1961	3661

=== Season 3 (1961–1962) ===
Beginning with this season, episode titles were shown on screen after Serling's opening monologues. "The Grave" and "Nothing in the Dark" are the exceptions since they were produced for season two.

No. overall	No. in season	Title	Directed by	Written by	Music by	Original release date	Prod. code
66	1	"Two"	Montgomery Pittman	Montgomery Pittman	Van Cleave	September 15, 1961	4802
67	2	"The Arrival"	Boris Sagal	Rod Serling	N/A	September 22, 1961	4814
68	3	"The Shelter"	Lamont Johnson	Rod Serling	N/A	September 29, 1961	4803
69	4	"The Passersby"	Elliot Silverstein	Rod Serling	Fred Steiner	October 6, 1961	4817
70	5	"A Game of Pool"	Buzz Kulik	George Clayton Johnson	N/A	October 13, 1961	4815
71	6	"The Mirror"	Don Medford	Rod Serling	N/A	October 20, 1961	4819
72	7	"The Grave"	Montgomery Pittman	Montgomery Pittman	N/A	October 27, 1961	3656
73	8	"It's a Good Life"	James Sheldon	Based on a short story by : Jerome Bixby; Teleplay by : Rod Serling	N/A	November 3, 1961	4801
74	9	"Deaths-Head Revisited"	Don Medford	Rod Serling	N/A	November 10, 1961	4804
75	10	"The Midnight Sun"	Anton Leader	Rod Serling	Van Cleave	November 17, 1961	4818
76	11	"Still Valley"	James Sheldon	Based on a short story by : Manly Wade Wellman; Teleplay by : Rod Serling	Wilbur Hatch	November 24, 1961	4808
77	12	"The Jungle"	William F. Claxton	Charles Beaumont	N/A	December 1, 1961	4806
78	13	"Once Upon a Time"	Norman Z. McLeod	Richard Matheson	William Lava; Ray Turner	December 15, 1961	4820
79	14	"Five Characters in Search of an Exit"	Lamont Johnson	Based on a short story by : Marvin Petal; Teleplay by : Rod Serling	N/A	December 22, 1961	4805
80	15	"A Quality of Mercy"	Buzz Kulik	Based on an idea by : Sam Rolfe; Teleplay by : Rod Serling	N/A	December 29, 1961	4809
81	16	"Nothing in the Dark"	Lamont Johnson	George Clayton Johnson	N/A	January 5, 1962	3662
82	17	"One More Pallbearer"	Lamont Johnson	Rod Serling	N/A	January 12, 1962	4823
83	18	"Dead Man's Shoes"	Montgomery Pittman	Charles Beaumont	N/A	January 19, 1962	4824
84	19	"The Hunt"	Harold Schuster	Earl Hamner, Jr.	Robert Drasnin	January 26, 1962	4810
85	20	"Showdown with Rance McGrew"	Christian Nyby	Based on an idea by : Frederic Louis Fox; Teleplay by : Rod Serling	N/A	February 2, 1962	4812
86	21	"Kick the Can"	Lamont Johnson	George Clayton Johnson	N/A	February 9, 1962	4821
87	22	"A Piano in the House"	David Greene	Earl Hamner, Jr.	N/A	February 16, 1962	4825
88	23	"The Last Rites of Jeff Myrtlebank"	Montgomery Pittman	Montgomery Pittman	Tommy Morgan	February 23, 1962	4811
89	24	"To Serve Man"	Richard L. Bare	Based on a short story by : Damon Knight; Teleplay by : Rod Serling	N/A	March 2, 1962	4807
90	25	"The Fugitive"	Richard L. Bare	Charles Beaumont	N/A	March 9, 1962	4816
91	26	"Little Girl Lost"	Paul Stewart	Richard Matheson	Bernard Herrmann	March 16, 1962	4828
92	27	"Person or Persons Unknown"	John Brahm	Charles Beaumont	N/A	March 23, 1962	4829
93	28	"The Little People"	William F. Claxton	Rod Serling	N/A	March 30, 1962	4822
94	29	"Four O'Clock"	Lamont Johnson	Based on a short story by : Price Day; Teleplay by : Rod Serling	N/A	April 6, 1962	4832
95	30	"Hocus-Pocus and Frisby"	Lamont Johnson	Based on a story by : Frederic Louis Fox; Teleplay by : Rod Serling	Tommy Morgan	April 13, 1962	4833
96	31	"The Trade-Ins"	Elliot Silverstein	Rod Serling	N/A	April 20, 1962	4831
97	32	"The Gift"	Allen H. Miner	Rod Serling	Laurindo Almeida	April 27, 1962	4830
98	33	"The Dummy"	Abner Biberman	Based on a story by : Lee Polk; Teleplay by : Rod Serling	N/A	May 4, 1962	4834
99	34	"Young Man's Fancy"	John Brahm	Richard Matheson	Nathan Scott	May 11, 1962	4813
100	35	"I Sing the Body Electric"	William F. Claxton and James Sheldon	Ray Bradbury	Van Cleave	May 18, 1962	4826
101	36	"Cavender Is Coming"	Christian Nyby	Rod Serling	N/A	May 25, 1962	4827
102	37	"The Changing of the Guard"	Robert Ellis Miller	Rod Serling	N/A	June 1, 1962	4835

=== Season 4 (1963) ===
For season four, the series was lengthened to one hour and moved to Thursdays at 9:30 pm (Eastern Time), replacing Fair Exchange on the schedule.

No. overall	No. in season	Title	Directed by	Written by	Music by	Original release date	Prod. code
103	1	"In His Image"	Perry Lafferty	Charles Beaumont	N/A	January 3, 1963	4851
104	2	"The Thirty Fathom Grave"	Perry Lafferty	Rod Serling	N/A	January 10, 1963	4857
105	3	"Valley of the Shadow"	Perry Lafferty	Charles Beaumont	N/A	January 17, 1963	4861
106	4	"He's Alive"	Stuart Rosenberg	Rod Serling	N/A	January 24, 1963	4856
107	5	"Mute"	Stuart Rosenberg	Richard Matheson	Fred Steiner	January 31, 1963	4858
108	6	"Death Ship"	Don Medford	Richard Matheson	N/A	February 7, 1963	4850
109	7	"Jess-Belle"	Buzz Kulik	Earl Hamner, Jr.	Van Cleave	February 14, 1963	4855
110	8	"Miniature"	Walter Grauman	Charles Beaumont	Fred Steiner	February 21, 1963	4862
111	9	"Printer's Devil"	Ralph Senensky	Charles Beaumont	N/A	February 28, 1963	4864
112	10	"No Time Like the Past"	Justus Addiss	Rod Serling	N/A	March 7, 1963	4853
113	11	"The Parallel"	Alan Crosland, Jr.	Rod Serling	N/A	March 14, 1963	4859
114	12	"I Dream of Genie"	Robert Gist	John Furia, Jr.	Fred Steiner	March 21, 1963	4860
115	13	"The New Exhibit"	John Brahm	Charles Beaumont	N/A	April 4, 1963	4866
116	14	"Of Late I Think of Cliffordville"	David Lowell Rich	Based on the short story "Blind Alley" by : Malcolm Jameson; Teleplay by : Rod Serling	N/A	April 11, 1963	4867
117	15	"The Incredible World of Horace Ford"	Abner Biberman	Reginald Rose	N/A	April 18, 1963	4854
118	16	"On Thursday We Leave for Home"	Buzz Kulik	Rod Serling	N/A	May 2, 1963	4868
119	17	"Passage on the Lady Anne"	Lamont Johnson	Charles Beaumont	Rene Garriguenc	May 9, 1963	4869
120	18	"The Bard"	David Butler	Rod Serling	Fred Steiner	May 23, 1963	4852

=== Season 5 (1963–1964) ===
In the fifth and final season, the series went back to a half-hour format, returned to a fall start, and aired Fridays at 9:30 pm (Eastern Time) on CBS.

No. overall	No. in season	Title	Directed by	Written by	Music by	Original release date	Prod. code
121	1	"In Praise of Pip"	Joseph M. Newman	Rod Serling	Rene Garriguenc	September 27, 1963	2607
122	2	"Steel"	Don Weis	Richard Matheson	Van Cleave	October 4, 1963	2602
123	3	"Nightmare at 20,000 Feet"	Richard Donner	Richard Matheson	N/A	October 11, 1963	2605
124	4	"A Kind of a Stopwatch"	John Rich	Based on a story by : Michael D. Rosenthal; Teleplay by : Rod Serling	Van Cleave	October 18, 1963	2609
125	5	"The Last Night of a Jockey"	Joseph M. Newman	Rod Serling	N/A	October 25, 1963	2616
126	6	"Living Doll"	Richard C. Sarafian	Charles Beaumont	Bernard Herrmann	November 1, 1963	2621
127	7	"The Old Man in the Cave"	Alan Crosland, Jr.	Based on the short story "The Old Man" by : Henry Slesar; Teleplay by : Rod Serling	N/A	November 8, 1963	2603
128	8	"Uncle Simon"	Don Siegel	Rod Serling	N/A	November 15, 1963	2604
129	9	"Probe 7, Over and Out"	Ted Post	Rod Serling	N/A	November 29, 1963	2622
130	10	"The 7th Is Made Up of Phantoms"	Alan Crosland, Jr.	Rod Serling	N/A	December 6, 1963	2606
131	11	"A Short Drink from a Certain Fountain"	Bernard Girard	Based on a story by : Lou Holz; Teleplay by : Rod Serling	N/A	December 13, 1963	2614
132	12	"Ninety Years Without Slumbering"	Roger Kay	Story by : George Clayton Johnson (Note: Credited as Johnson Smith); Teleplay by : Richard De Roy	Bernard Herrmann	December 20, 1963	2615
133	13	"Ring-a-Ding Girl"	Alan Crosland, Jr.	Earl Hamner, Jr.	N/A	December 27, 1963	2623
134	14	"You Drive"	John Brahm	Earl Hamner, Jr.	N/A	January 3, 1964	2625
135	15	"The Long Morrow"	Robert Florey	Rod Serling	N/A	January 10, 1964	2624
136	16	"The Self-Improvement of Salvadore Ross"	Don Siegel	Based on a short story by : Henry Slesar; Teleplay by : Jerry McNeely	N/A	January 17, 1964	2612
137	17	"Number 12 Looks Just Like You"	Abner Biberman	Charles Beaumont and John Tomerlin	N/A	January 24, 1964	2618
138	18	"Black Leather Jackets"	Joseph M. Newman	Earl Hamner, Jr.	Van Cleave	January 31, 1964	2628
139	19	"Night Call"	Jacques Tourneur	Richard Matheson	N/A	February 7, 1964 (Note: Originally scheduled for November 22, 1963, but delayed due to the assassination of John F. Kennedy)	2610
140	20	"From Agnes—With Love"	Richard Donner	Bernard C. Schoenfeld	Van Cleave	February 14, 1964	2629
141	21	"Spur of the Moment"	Elliot Silverstein	Richard Matheson	Rene Garriguenc	February 21, 1964	2608
142	22	"An Occurrence at Owl Creek Bridge"	Robert Enrico	From a story by : Ambrose Bierce; Adapted by : Robert Enrico	Henri Lanoe	February 28, 1964	N/A
143	23	"Queen of the Nile"	John Brahm	Charles Beaumont	Lucien Moraweck	March 6, 1964	2626
144	24	"What's in the Box"	Richard L. Bare	Martin M. Goldsmith	N/A	March 13, 1964	2635
145	25	"The Masks"	Ida Lupino	Rod Serling	N/A	March 20, 1964	2601
146	26	"I Am the Night—Color Me Black"	Abner Biberman	Rod Serling	N/A	March 27, 1964	2630
147	27	"Sounds and Silences"	Richard Donner	Rod Serling	N/A	April 3, 1964	2631
148	28	"Caesar and Me"	Robert Butler	Adele T. Strassfield	Richard Shores	April 10, 1964	2636
149	29	"The Jeopardy Room"	Richard Donner	Rod Serling	N/A	April 17, 1964	2639
150	30	"Stopover in a Quiet Town" "Strangers in Town"	Ron Winston	Earl Hamner, Jr.	N/A	April 24, 1964	2611
151	31	"The Encounter"	Robert Butler	Martin M. Goldsmith	N/A	May 1, 1964	2640
152	32	"Mr. Garrity and the Graves"	Ted Post	Based on a story by : Mike Korologos; Teleplay by : Rod Serling	Tommy Morgan	May 8, 1964	2637
153	33	"The Brain Center at Whipple's"	Richard Donner	Rod Serling	N/A	May 15, 1964	2632
154	34	"Come Wander with Me"	Richard Donner	Anthony Wilson	Jeff Alexander	May 22, 1964	2641
155	35	"The Fear"	Ted Post	Rod Serling	N/A	May 29, 1964	2633
156	36	"The Bewitchin' Pool"	Joseph M. Newman	Earl Hamner, Jr.	N/A	June 19, 1964	2619
