= The Twilight Zone season 2 =

The Twilight Zone
- Season 2
- No. of episodes: 29

Release
- Original network: CBS
- Original release: September 30, 1960 – June 2, 1961

Season chronology
- ← Previous; Season 1 Next → Season 3

The second season of The Twilight Zone aired Fridays at 10:00–10:30 pm (EST) on CBS from September 30, 1960, to June 2, 1961. There are 29 episodes.

== Intro ==
This season debuted the theme music by Marius Constant most often associated with The Twilight Zone, replacing the first season music written by Bernard Herrmann. The graphics used for the intro were a hybrid of the two sets of graphics used for the first season, with some slight modifications to Rod Serling's narration. For the first three episodes Serling's narration went as follows:

"You're traveling through another dimension. A dimension not only of sight and sound but of mind. A journey into a wondrous land of imagination. Next stop—The Twilight Zone."

For the subsequent episodes some phrases were added, with the same set of graphics:

"You're traveling through another dimension. A dimension not only of sight and sound but of mind. A journey into a wondrous land whose boundaries are that of imagination. That's the signpost up ahead. Your next stop—The Twilight Zone."

This opening was added to some first season episodes that were aired as repeats during the summer of 1961. In most of these Herrmann's theme music continued to be played for the closing credits.

== Episodes ==
No. overall	No. in season	Title	Directed by	Written by	Music by	Original release date	Prod. code
37	1	"King Nine Will Not Return"	Buzz Kulik	Rod Serling	Fred Steiner	September 30, 1960	173-3639
38	2	"The Man in the Bottle"	Don Medford	Rod Serling	N/A	October 7, 1960	173-3638
39	3	"Nervous Man in a Four Dollar Room"	Douglas Heyes	Rod Serling	Jerry Goldsmith	October 14, 1960	173-3641
40	4	"A Thing About Machines"	David Orrick McDearmon	Rod Serling	N/A	October 28, 1960	173-3645
41	5	"The Howling Man"	Douglas Heyes	Charles Beaumont	N/A	November 4, 1960	173-3642
42	6	"Eye of the Beholder" "The Private World of Darkness"	Douglas Heyes	Rod Serling	Bernard Herrmann	November 11, 1960	173-3640
43	7	"Nick of Time"	Richard L. Bare	Richard Matheson	N/A	November 18, 1960	173-3643
44	8	"The Lateness of the Hour"	Jack Smight	Rod Serling	N/A	December 2, 1960	N/A
45	9	"The Trouble with Templeton"	Buzz Kulik	E. Jack Neuman	Jeff Alexander	December 9, 1960	173-3649
46	10	"A Most Unusual Camera"	John Rich	Rod Serling	N/A	December 16, 1960	173-3606
47	11	"The Night of the Meek"	Jack Smight	Rod Serling	N/A	December 23, 1960	N/A
48	12	"Dust"	Douglas Heyes	Rod Serling	Jerry Goldsmith	January 6, 1961	173-3653
49	13	"Back There"	David Orrick McDearmon	Rod Serling	Jerry Goldsmith	January 13, 1961	173-3648
50	14	"The Whole Truth"	James Sheldon	Rod Serling	N/A	January 20, 1961	N/A
51	15	"The Invaders"	Douglas Heyes	Richard Matheson	Jerry Goldsmith	January 27, 1961	173-3646
52	16	"A Penny for Your Thoughts"	James Sheldon	George Clayton Johnson	N/A	February 3, 1961	173-3650
53	17	"Twenty Two"	Jack Smight	Based on an anecdote by : Bennett Cerf; Teleplay by : Rod Serling	N/A	February 10, 1961	N/A
54	18	"The Odyssey of Flight 33"	Jus Addiss	Rod Serling	N/A	February 24, 1961	173-3651
55	19	"Mr. Dingle, the Strong"	John Brahm	Rod Serling	N/A	March 3, 1961	173-3644
56	20	"Static"	Buzz Kulik	Based on a story by : OCee Ritch; Teleplay by : Charles Beaumont	N/A	March 10, 1961	N/A
57	21	"The Prime Mover"	Richard L. Bare	Charles Beaumont	N/A	March 24, 1961	173-3647
58	22	"Long Distance Call"	James Sheldon	Charles Beaumont and William Idelson	N/A	March 31, 1961	N/A
59	23	"A Hundred Yards Over the Rim"	Buzz Kulik	Rod Serling	Fred Steiner	April 7, 1961	3654
60	24	"The Rip Van Winkle Caper"	Jus Addiss	Rod Serling	N/A	April 21, 1961	3655
61	25	"The Silence"	Boris Sagal	Rod Serling	N/A	April 28, 1961	3658
62	26	"Shadow Play"	John Brahm	Charles Beaumont	N/A	May 5, 1961	3657
63	27	"The Mind and the Matter"	Buzz Kulik	Rod Serling	N/A	May 12, 1961	3659
64	28	"Will the Real Martian Please Stand Up?"	Montgomery Pittman	Rod Serling	N/A	May 26, 1961	3660
65	29	"The Obsolete Man"	Elliot Silverstein	Rod Serling	N/A	June 2, 1961	3661
