= A Penny for Your Thoughts (The Twilight Zone) =

- The Twilight Zone episode
- Episode no.: Season 2 Episode 16
- Directed by: James Sheldon
- Written by: George Clayton Johnson
- Production code: 173-3650
- Original air date: February 3, 1961

Guest appearances
- Dick York as Hector B. Poole; June Dayton as Helen Turner; Dan Tobin as Mr. Bagby; Hayden Rorke as Mr. Sykes; Cyril Delevanti as Mr. Smithers; Patrick Waltz as Brand

Episode chronology
← Previous "The Invaders"	Next → "Twenty Two"
- The Twilight Zone (1959 TV series, season 2)

"A Penny for Your Thoughts" is episode 52 of the American television anthology series The Twilight Zone, written by George Clayton Johnson. It originally aired on February 3, 1961, on CBS.

== Opening narration ==
Mr. Hector B. Poole, resident of the Twilight Zone. Flip a coin and keep flipping it. What are the odds? Half the time it will come up heads, half the time tails. But in one freakish chance in a million, it'll land on its edge. Mr. Hector B. Poole, a bright human coin - on his way to the bank.

== Plot ==
Hector B. Poole is a sensitive, insecure bank clerk. On the way to work, he tosses a coin into a vendor's open box to pay for a newspaper, and it miraculously lands on its edge. Suddenly, he can hear other people's thoughts, but does not know what's going on. Distracted, he is nearly hit by a car and is confused when he hears the driver outwardly expressing concern while inwardly cursing Hector's carelessness.

At his place of business, Hector is finalizing the paperwork for a $200,000 loan to a businessman named Sykes; he hears Sykes thinking about using the money for a run at the horse track to win back money he has embezzled from his company. Hector challenges Sykes, who accuses him of lying and withdraws his business from the bank, to the boss Bagby's annoyance.

Next Hector hears an old, trusted employee, Smithers, thinking about how he will steal cash from the bank and escape to Bermuda. He takes Helen Turner, a co-worker who thinks affectionate thoughts about him, fully into his confidence; she does not believe in his powers, but urges him to tell Bagby about Smithers. Hector does, saying he overheard Smithers; incredulous at first, Bagby decides to investigate Smithers. Smithers proves to be innocent, and Bagby fires Hector. Smithers then privately admits to Hector that he has fantasized for years about theft, but never goes through with it.

Hector vents his unhappiness to Helen; he has learned more than he wanted to know about the disconnect between people's thoughts and actions. Bagby learns that Sykes has been arrested for gambling with company money and offers to reinstate Hector. Using blackmail based on knowledge of an affair his boss is having, Hector gets rehired and promoted and then obtains a Bermuda vacation for Smithers.

As Hector returns home with Helen after work, he returns to the newsstand where his coin is still standing. Buying an afternoon paper, he knocks it over, then finds his mind-reading ability gone. He leaves the newsstand with Helen, hopeful about the future.

== Closing narration ==
One time in a million, a coin will land on its edge, but all it takes to knock it over is a vagrant breeze, a vibration, or a slight blow. Hector B. Poole, a human coin, on edge for a brief time - in the Twilight Zone.

== See also ==
- List of The Twilight Zone (1959 TV series) episodes
