= The Night of the Meek (The Twilight Zone, 1959) =

- The Twilight Zone episode
- Episode no.: Season 2 Episode 11
- Directed by: Jack Smight
- Written by: Rod Serling
- Production code: 173-3665
- Original air date: December 23, 1960

Guest appearances
- Art Carney as Henry Corwin; John Fiedler as Mr. Dundee; Val Avery as the Bartender; Meg Wyllie as Sister Florence; Kay Cousins Johnson as Irate Mother; Burt Mustin as Old Man; Frank Mills

Episode chronology
← Previous "A Most Unusual Camera"	Next → "Dust"
- The Twilight Zone (1959 TV series, season 2)

"The Night of the Meek" is episode 47 of the American television anthology series The Twilight Zone. It originally aired on December 23, 1960, on CBS. It was one of the six episodes of the second season which were shot on videotape in a short-lived experiment aimed to cut costs.

== Introductory scene/opening narration ==
As snow begins to fall, a drunk Henry Corwin, wearing his Santa Claus suit, stumbles and half-falls at a curbside lamppost. He is approached by two tenement children pleading for toys, a Christmas dinner, and "a job for my daddy." As Corwin begins to sob, the camera turns to Rod Serling standing on the sidewalk:

This is Mr. Henry Corwin, normally unemployed, who once a year takes the lead role in the uniquely popular American institution, that of the department-store Santa Claus in a road-company version of 'The Night Before Christmas'. But in just a moment Mr. Henry Corwin, ersatz Santa Claus, will enter a strange kind of North Pole which is one part the wondrous spirit of Christmas and one part the magic that can only be found...in the Twilight Zone.

== Plot ==
On Christmas Eve, Corwin arrives for his seasonal job as a department-store Santa an hour late and obviously drunk. When customers complain, Dundee, the manager, fires him and orders him off the premises. Corwin says that he drinks because he lives in a rooming house with the poor, for whom he is incapable of fulfilling his role as Santa. He declares that if he had just one wish granted him on Christmas Eve, he'd "like to see the meek inherit the earth."

Still in his outfit, he returns to the bar but is refused re-entry by Bruce, the bartender. Stumbling into an alley, he hears sleigh bells. A cat knocks down a large burlap bag full of empty cans, but when Corwin trips over it, it is now filled with gift-wrapped packages. Overjoyed at his sudden ability to fulfill dreams, Corwin proceeds to hand out presents to passing children and then to derelict men attending Christmas Eve service at a mission house. Irritated by the disruption, the proprietress goes outside to fetch Officer Flaherty.

Flaherty takes Corwin to the police station on suspicion of theft. Dundee meets them at the station, where he and Flaherty find Corwin's sack is full of empty cans, as it was before, when the cat knocked it over. Angry at having his time wasted, Dundee accuses Flaherty of incompetence; when Dundee challenges Corwin to produce a bottle of cherry brandy, vintage 1903, Corwin does just that, and is set free. He continues to distribute gifts until midnight, when the bag is empty.

A man named Burt, whose desired pipe and smoking jacket comes from Corwin's bag, points out that Corwin himself has not received a gift. Corwin says that if he had his choice of any gift at all, "I think I'd wish I could do this every year." Returning to the alley where the gift-laden bag had presented itself, he encounters an elf sitting in a large reindeer-hauled sleigh, waiting for him. Realizing that his wish has come true and he is now the real Santa Claus, Corwin sits in the sleigh and sets off with the elf.

Flaherty and Dundee had spent the time drinking the cherry brandy. Emerging drunkenly from the precinct, they hear bells and look upward, seeing Corwin ascending into the night sky. Dundee invites Flaherty to accompany him home and share some hot coffee, with brandy poured in it, adding, "...and we'll thank God for miracles, Flaherty..." The episode ends with a shot of the bag sitting next to the trash can Corwin originally found it in.

== Closing narration ==
A word to the wise to all the children of the twentieth century, whether their concern be pediatrics or geriatrics, whether they crawl on hands and knees and wear diapers or walk with a cane and comb their beards. There's a wondrous magic to Christmas and there's a special power reserved for little people. In short, there's nothing mightier than the meek. And a Merry Christmas to each and all.

The original narration, on December 23, 1960, ended with the words, "and a Merry Christmas, to each and all", but that phrase was deleted in the 1980s and is now excluded from reruns, VHS releases and the five-DVD set The Twilight Zone: The Definitive Edition. The phrase is heard in the Blu-ray release of Season 2 as well as the version streamed by Netflix and Paramount Plus, but with noticeably different sound quality from the rest of Serling's narration. As broadcast on the MeTV Network on Christmas Day 2019 and thereafter, the last line has been restored in syndication.

== Credits ==
- Directed by Jack Smight
- Written by Rod Serling
- Produced by Buck Houghton
- Art Carney as Henry Corwin
- John Fiedler as Mr. Dundee
- Robert P. Lieb as Flaherty
- Val Avery as the Bartender
- Meg Wyllie as Sister Florence
- Kay Cousins Johnson as Irate Mother
- Burt Mustin as Old Man (Burt)
- Andrea Margolis as Santa's Elf
- Trains by Lionel Corp.
- Reindeer furnished by Santa's Village – Skyforest, California

== Production ==
"The Night of the Meek" was one of six Twilight Zone episodes shot on videotape instead of film in an attempt to cut costs. By November 1960 The Twilight Zone's season two had already broadcast five episodes and finished filming sixteen. However, at a cost of about $65,000 per episode, the show was exceeding its budget. As a result, six consecutive episodes (production code #173-3662 through #173-3667) were videotaped at CBS Television City and eventually transferred to 16-millimeter film ["kinescoped"] for syndicated rebroadcasts. Total savings on editing and cinematography amounted to only about $30,000 for all six entries, not enough to justify the loss of depth of visual perspective, which made the shows look like stage-bound live TV dramas (such as Playhouse 90, which was also produced at CBS), or even daytime soap operas, which, at the time, were quickly and cheaply produced live on one or two sets. The experiment was deemed a failure and never attempted again.

== Personnel with multiple Twilight Zone credits ==
- Jack Smight directed three other Twilight Zone episodes: "The Lonely", "The Lateness of the Hour", and "Twenty Two"
- John Fiedler played a bureaucratic angel in the third season's penultimate episode, "Cavender Is Coming"
- Burt Mustin plays one of the residents of the old-age home in third season's "Kick the Can"
- Andrea Margolis' second appearance came the following week, "Dust", in which she portrays Estrelita, a little Mexican girl
- Nan Peterson's three other appearances are in "Walking Distance", "The Whole Truth", and "From Agnes—With Love"

== Remake ==
- This episode was remade into an episode of the 1980s version of The Twilight Zone called "Night of the Meek", which starred Richard Mulligan as Henry Corwin and William Atherton as Mr. Dundee
- There was a radio adaptation of The Twilight Zone episode "The Night of the Meek" which starred Christopher McDonald

== See also ==
- List of The Twilight Zone (1959 TV series) episodes

== Sources ==
- DeVoe, Bill. (2008). Trivia from The Twilight Zone. Albany, GA: Bear Manor Media. ISBN 978-1-59393-136-0
- Grams, Martin. (2008). The Twilight Zone: Unlocking the Door to a Television Classic. Churchville, MD: OTR Publishing. ISBN 978-0-9703310-9-0
