= Dust (The Twilight Zone) =

- The Twilight Zone episode
- Episode no.: Season 2 Episode 12
- Directed by: Douglas Heyes
- Written by: Rod Serling
- Production code: 173-3653
- Original air date: January 6, 1961

Guest appearances
- Thomas Gomez; Vladimir Sokoloff; John Larch; John Alonzo; Paul Genge; Dorothy Adams; Duane Grey; Andrea Darvi

Episode chronology
| ← Previous "The Night of the Meek" | Next → "Back There" |
- The Twilight Zone (1959 TV series, season 2)

"Dust" is episode 48 of the American television anthology series The Twilight Zone. It originally aired on January 6, 1961, on CBS, and was the 12th episode of the second season. The episode was written by series creator Rod Serling, and was directed by Douglas Heyes. It starred Thomas Gomez in his second appearance on the show following "Escape Clause", as well as Vladimir Sokoloff, in the first of his three appearances on the series. It is one of the few episodes that does not contain any overtly fantasy or science-fiction elements, though its ending is quite ambiguous in this regard.

== Opening narration ==
There was a village. Built of crumbling clay and rotting wood. And it squatted ugly under a broiling sun like a sick and mangy animal wanting to die. This village had a virus, shared by its people. It was the germ of squalor, of hopelessness, of a loss of faith. For the faithless, the hopeless, the misery-laden, there is time, ample time, to engage in one of the other pursuits of men - they begin to destroy themselves.

== Plot ==
In the Old West, in a desolate barren town, the sadistic and unscrupulous peddler Sykes mocks Luis Gallegos, who is due to be hanged. Luis is guilty of driving drunk and accidentally killing a child. Luis' father arrives in the village and pleads with the mother and father of the dead girl to spare his son the hanging. His pleas fall on deaf ears. After selling the executioner some five-strand rope needed for the hanging, Sykes sells a bag of dust to the condemned man's father, collecting ordinary dirt from the ground and insisting that it is magic dust that will spread good will throughout the crowd and make them feel love and forgiveness for Luis.

As the crowd gathers for the hanging, Luis' father cries out and starts sprinkling the dust everywhere. He hears the trapdoor drop behind him and turns to see that the fresh and sturdy rope has snapped above the noose, and Luis is unharmed. When asked if another hanging attempt should be made, the girl's parents decide that it should not, that Luis has suffered enough and maybe they have had a sign from God. As father and son walk home, Sykes rechecks the rope which appears to be in perfect condition. Then he throws his gold pieces from the sale of the dust to the poor children of the town, insisting that they have them. He walks away from the scene laughing hysterically, stating that the dust must have been magic after all.

== Closing narration ==
It was a very small, misery-laden village on the day of a hanging and of little historical consequence. And if there's any moral to it at all, let's say that in any quest for magic, in any search for sorcery, witchery, legerdemain, first check the human heart. For inside this deep place is a wizardry that costs far more than a few pieces of gold. Tonight's case in point - in the Twilight Zone.

== Cast ==
- Thomas Gomez as Sykes
- Vladimir Sokoloff as Gallegos
- John Larch as Sheriff Koch
- John Alonzo as Luis Gallegos
- Paul Genge as John Canfield
- Dorothy Adams as Mrs. Canfield
- Duane Grey as Rogers
- Andrea Darvi as Estrellita Gallegos

== See also ==
- List of The Twilight Zone (1959 TV series) episodes
