= Eye of the Beholder (The Twilight Zone, 2002) =

- The Twilight Zone episode
- Episode no.: Season 1 Episode 39
- Directed by: David R. Ellis
- Written by: Rod Serling
- Production code: 140
- Original air date: April 30, 2003

Guest appearances
- Molly Sims; Reggie Hayes; Roger Cross

Episode chronology
← Previous "The Collection"	Next → "Developing"

"Eye of the Beholder" is the 39th episode of the sci-fi anthology television series The Twilight Zone. The episode aired on April 30, 2003 on UPN. It is a remake of the episode from the original Twilight Zone written by Rod Serling about a woman with bandages covering her face hoping that a last-chance surgery will allow her to fit in with society, lest she be sent to a community of people with her 'deformity'.

== Opening narration ==
You have been introduced to Miss Janet Tyler, who lives in a very private world of darkness – a universe whose dimensions are the size, thickness and length of the bandages that cover her face. In a moment, we'll witness the removal of those bandages and we'll see what's under them – keeping in mind, of course, that we're not to be surprised by what we see, because this isn't just a hospital. And this patient, Janet Tyler, patient number 307 is not just a woman, because this happens to be the Twilight Zone.

== Summary ==
Janet Tyler is lying in a hospital bed with bandages wrapped around her head. It is her eleventh attempt at looking normal in a society that regards her as ugly and since no more procedures are allowed after eleven, she is informed by Dr. Bernardi that she would have to live among others like her should this last treatment prove to be unsuccessful. Janet is anxious to see the result of her latest surgery and the doctor complies with her request to take the bandages off, while requesting the anesthetist to be present in case she gets violent. The bandages are removed during a speech by the Leader of the State and Janet is revealed to be beautiful, while those in her society are revealed to be deformed. Janet flees before the doctor can have her sedated and finds herself surrounded by screens showing the Leader's face as he preaches about conformity. She eventually runs into the break room and meets Mr. Smith, a handsome man who is to take her to a village with people just like them and tells her that it doesn't matter why they were born the way they are, because "beauty is in the eye of the beholder." The doctor says goodbye to Janet as Mr. Smith leads her out of the hospital to a new life with those of her own kind.

== Closing narration ==
Now the questions that come to mind: Where is this place and when is it? What kind of world is this where ugliness is the norm and beauty the deviation from that norm? You want an answer? The answer is it doesn't make any difference, because the old saying happens to be true. Beauty is in the eye of the beholder, in this year or a hundred years hence. On this planet or wherever there is intelligent life, beauty is in the eye of the beholder. Lesson to be learned in the Twilight Zone.

== Cast ==
- Molly Sims as Janet Tyler
- Reggie Hayes as Doctor Bernardi
- Roger Cross as The Leader
- Allison Hossack as Janet's Nurse
- Chris Kramer as Walter Smith
- June B. Wilde as Nurse
- Michael Karl Richards as Orderly
