= The Mind and the Matter =

- The Twilight Zone episode
- Episode no.: Season 2 Episode 27
- Directed by: Buzz Kulik
- Written by: Rod Serling
- Production code: 173-3659
- Original air date: May 12, 1961

Guest appearances
- Shelley Berman as Archibald Beechcroft; Jack Grinnage as Henry; Chet Stratton as Mr. Rogers; Robert McCord as Elevator Operator; Jeane Wood as Landlady

Episode chronology
← Previous "Shadow Play"	Next → "Will the Real Martian Please Stand Up?"
- The Twilight Zone (1959 TV series, season 2)

"The Mind and the Matter" is episode 63 of the American television anthology series The Twilight Zone. It originally aired on May 12, 1961 on CBS.

== Opening narration ==
A brief if frenetic introduction to Mr. Archibald Beechcroft. A child of the 20th century, a product of the population explosion, and one of the inheritors of the legacy of progress. Mr. Beechcroft again, this time Act Two of his daily battle for survival, and in just a moment our hero will begin his personal one-man rebellion against the mechanics of his age, and to do so he will enlist certain aides available only in the Twilight Zone.

== Plot ==
Archibald Beechcroft, a misanthropist, has a crowded time getting to work, and becomes annoyed when young office intern Henry spills coffee all over his suit. Taking some aspirin in the bathroom, his boss Mr. Rogers lectures him about a proper lifestyle to maintain his health. Aggravated, Beechcroft says he's fed up with the crowded conditions at the office and wants to eliminate all the people of the world.

In the cafeteria for lunch, Henry apologizes to Beechcroft further for spilling the coffee, saving him a seat and presenting him with a book titled The Mind and the Matter, which deals with the ultimate in concentration; Henry explains that his friend has learned how to make things happen with his mind. Beechcroft leafs through the book in the cafeteria, continues to read it on the subway ride home, and finishes it over dinner in his apartment. When his landlady knocks to collect his rent, he tests the theory that concentration is the greatest power in the world, and successfully makes her disappear.

The next day, Beechcroft uses his concentration to make his crowded subway station empty of people. He rides an empty subway train to his empty office, with doors opening for him. Though he takes satisfaction in his newfound peace and quiet, he soon grows bored. Reflections of himself appear, taunting him as bored and lonely. He tries causing diversions such as an earthquake and thunderstorm, but is not entertained. He glumly rides the empty train subway home, where he is again taunted by his reflection. Arguing with it, he gets the idea of repopulating the world with people like himself.

He does so, and the next morning the crowds in the subway and elevator are back, but now everyone has his face and antisocial personality. Dismayed, he returns the world to the way it used to be. Henry again spills coffee on him, and asks about the book. Beechcroft pretends to have found the book "totally unbelievable".

== Closing narration ==
Mr. Archibald Beechcroft, a child of the twentieth century, who has found out through trial and error – and mostly error – that with all its faults, it may well be that this is the best of all possible worlds. People notwithstanding, it has much to offer. Tonight's case in point – in the Twilight Zone.
