= The Trouble with Templeton =

- The Twilight Zone episode
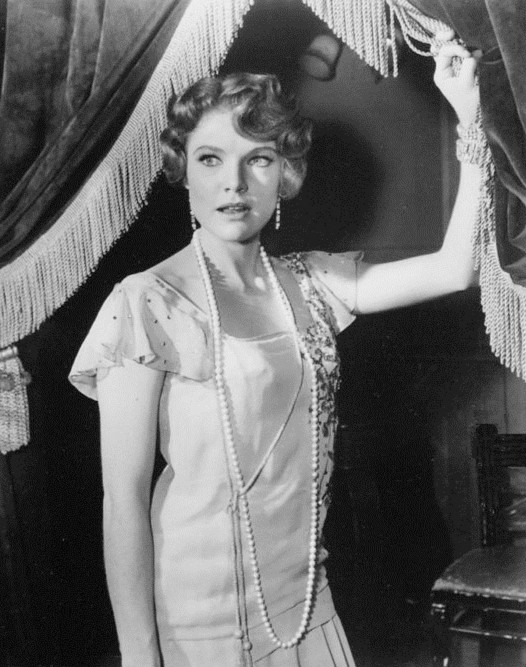
- Pippa Scott in 1960
- Episode no.: Season 2 Episode 9
- Directed by: Buzz Kulik
- Written by: E. Jack Neuman
- Production code: 173-3649
- Original air date: December 9, 1960

Guest appearances
- Brian Aherne; Pippa Scott; Sydney Pollack; Dave Willock; King Calder; Larry J. Blake; David Thursby; Charles S. Carlson

Episode chronology
← Previous "The Lateness of the Hour"	Next → "A Most Unusual Camera"
- The Twilight Zone (1959 TV series) (season 2)

"The Trouble with Templeton" is episode 45 of the American television anthology series The Twilight Zone starring Brian Aherne, Pippa Scott and Sydney Pollack. The episode originally aired on December 9, 1960 on CBS.

== Opening narration ==
Pleased to present for your consideration, Mr. Booth Templeton; serious and successful star of over thirty Broadway plays, who is not quite all right today. Yesterday and its memories is what he wants, and yesterday is what he'll get. Soon his years and his troubles will descend on him in an avalanche. In order not to be crushed Mr. Booth Templeton will escape from his theater and his world, and make his debut on another stage, in another world, that we call the Twilight Zone.

== Plot ==
Aging Broadway actor Booth Templeton is at home, watching his much-younger wife, Doris, blatantly flirting with a younger man by their pool. Booth notes that he hasn't achieved any contentment with his wife and reminisces about the happiness he had with his first wife, Laura, who died after seven years of marriage. Booth leaves to attend the first rehearsal of his new play, where he learns the director has been replaced. The new director, Arthur Willis, shows no respect for the experienced Booth and questions his commitment to the play.

Pressured and desperately unhappy, Booth runs out the stage door and discovers he has been transported more than 30 years back in time. A stagehand informs him that his wife, Laura, is waiting for him at the speakeasy around the corner. He finds her there, with Barney Flueger, who wrote the hit play The Great Seed in which Templeton happens to be starring in 1927. Laura is surprisingly cavalier toward Booth. In his frustration, he snatches a script Laura uses to fan herself and implores Laura to appreciate their life together. She rebuffs all Booth's attempts at serious conversation, laughing at him with Barney, and eventually she tells Booth to leave. As he does so, angry and bewildered, the music stops, all noise ceases, and the room grows dark, with the last poignant images seen before the light is completely extinguished being a somber-faced Barney and a saddened Laura.

Booth runs back into the theater and the present. He fans himself with Laura's script and notices that it is titled What to Do When Booth Comes Back. Booth sees that ghosts from his past were not mocking him but actually had staged a performance for him in order to break him free from his paralyzing nostalgia and longing for the old days. Realizing that Laura loved him and didn't want him to be stuck in the past, Booth returns to the rehearsal, asserts himself, dismisses the interfering producer of the play (Mr. Sperry), and tells director Willis that he is "Mr. Templeton" not "Templeton" and will not tolerate any invalidation. Commanding the respect that is his due as a distinguished actor, Booth begins to live happily in the present time with a new future.

== Closing narration ==
Mr. Booth Templeton, who shared with most human beings the hunger to recapture the past moments, the ones that soften with the years. But in his case, the characters of his past blocked him out and sent him back to his own time, which is where we find him now. Mr. Booth Templeton, who had a round-trip ticket - into The Twilight Zone.

== Cast ==
- Brian Aherne as Booth Templeton
- Pippa Scott as Laura Templeton
- Sydney Pollack as Arthur Willis
- Dave Willock as Marty
- King Calder as Sid Sperry
- Larry J. Blake as Freddie
- David Thursby as Eddie
- Charles S. Carlson as Barney Flueger

== See also ==
- List of The Twilight Zone (1959 TV series) episodes

== Sources ==
- DeVoe, Bill. (2008). Trivia from The Twilight Zone. Albany, GA: Bear Manor Media. ISBN 978-1-59393-136-0
- Grams, Martin. (2008). The Twilight Zone: Unlocking the Door to a Television Classic. Churchville, MD: OTR Publishing. ISBN 978-0-9703310-9-0
