= Nick of Time (The Twilight Zone) =

- The Twilight Zone episode
- Episode no.: Season 2 Episode 7
- Directed by: Richard L. Bare
- Written by: Richard Matheson
- Production code: 173-3643
- Original air date: November 18, 1960

Guest appearances
- William Shatner; Patricia Breslin; Stafford Repp; Guy Wilkerson; Walter Reed

Episode chronology
← Previous "Eye of the Beholder"	Next → "The Lateness of the Hour"
- The Twilight Zone (1959 TV series, season 2)

"Nick of Time" is episode 43 of the American television anthology series The Twilight Zone. It originally aired on November 18, 1960 on CBS.

== Opening narration ==
The hand belongs to Mr. Don S. Carter, male member of a honeymoon team en route across the Ohio countryside to New York City. In one moment, they will be subjected to a gift most humans never receive in a lifetime. For one penny, they will be able to look into the future. The time is now, the place is a little diner in Ridgeview, Ohio, and what this young couple doesn't realize is that this town happens to lie on the outskirts of the Twilight Zone.

== Plot ==
When newlyweds Don and Pat Carter's automobile breaks down in Ridgeview, Ohio, en route to New York City, they have lunch at the Busy Bee Cafe while they wait for repairs to be made. The table they sit in has a fortune teller machine on the table that answers yes or no questions for a penny each. Don asks if he is going to get a promotion at work. The card says, "It has been decided in your favor." Don calls the office and learns he has been promoted to office manager. Don then asks if their car will be fixed in the promised time, and receives the answer, "You may never know." Questioning the seer on this point produces eerily relevant answers, leading to the prediction that it is unsafe to leave the diner until 3 p.m.

Don stalls for time, but Pat argues that the seer cannot predict the future and convinces him to leave a few minutes before 3, and the couple is almost struck by a car while crossing the street. They return to the café but find another couple at their table. Don has them wait at the counter until the couple has left. Pat remains skeptical, contending that the seer answers in generalities; she feels that Don is creating the links to his questions himself. They go back to the table, where Don asks different questions, including one about their car. The seer answers, "It has already been taken care of," and the mechanic steps into the diner to say the car is fixed. Don challenges Pat to try it for herself. Although she asks the seer trick questions, the answers are still accurate.

Don wants the seer to tell him where they're going to live, but Pat finally tells Don that whether the seer can really tell the future doesn't matter, since he is capable of making his own future. Recognizing the truth in what she says, Don apologizes and then announces to the seer that they are leaving to do what they please. After their exit, a distraught older couple enters the diner, sitting at the seer's table. The man asks questions about them leaving Ridgeview and grows increasingly deflated by the answers.

== Closing narration ==
Counterbalance in the little town of Ridgeview, Ohio. Two people permanently enslaved by the tyranny of fear and superstition, facing the future with a kind of helpless dread. Two others facing the future with confidence — having escaped one of the darker places of the Twilight Zone.

== Cast ==
- William Shatner as Don S. Carter
- Patricia Breslin as Pat Carter
- Stafford Repp as Mechanic (Lars)
- Guy Wilkerson as Counter Man
- Walter Reed as Man
- Dee Carroll as Woman

== Production notes ==
Richard Matheson, writing in The Twilight Zone Magazine, said that he wished that Pat Breslin (who played Pat Carter) had been available again to play the wife of Shatner's character in the season five episode "Nightmare at 20,000 Feet".

The street and building seen in this episode are the same as seen in the episode "I Sing the Body Electric". Both episodes feature scenes in which people are almost run over by vehicles on the same street.

The street and building are also visible in the opening scene of the episode "Black Leather Jackets".

When selecting a record in the jukebox to celebrate his promotion, Don chooses the Glenn Miller version of "American Patrol".

== Legacy ==
“Replay”, an episode of the 2019 revival series, features a shot of the mystic seer in a cafe.

== See also ==
- List of The Twilight Zone (1959 TV series) episodes
- "The Path" – A related episode
