= The Invaders (The Twilight Zone) =

- The Twilight Zone episode
- Episode no.: Season 2 Episode 15
- Directed by: Douglas Heyes
- Written by: Richard Matheson
- Production code: 173-3646
- Original air date: January 27, 1961

Guest appearances
- Agnes Moorehead as Woman; Douglas Heyes as Invaders (voice)

Episode chronology
← Previous "The Whole Truth"	Next → "A Penny for Your Thoughts"
- The Twilight Zone (1959 TV series, season 2)

"The Invaders" is episode 15 of season 2 (and episode 51 overall) of the American television anthology series The Twilight Zone. The episode, which originally aired January 27, 1961, starred Agnes Moorehead. It was written by Richard Matheson, directed by Douglas Heyes, and scored by Jerry Goldsmith. Distinctive features of this episode include a near-solo performance by one character (interacting with miniature puppet "characters"), and an almost complete lack of dialogue. The only dialogue in the entire episode aside from Rod Serling's usual narration came from Douglas Heyes, the episode's director. In addition, this is the only episode in which Rod Serling gives his opening monologue at the start of the prologue, rather than the end. The protagonist portrayed by Agnes Moorehead often cries out in pain and terror, but never speaks.

== Opening narration ==
This is one of the out-of-the-way places, the unvisited places, bleak, wasted, dying. This is a farmhouse, handmade, crude, a house without electricity or gas, a house untouched by progress. This is the woman who lives in the house, a woman who's been alone for many years, a strong, simple woman whose only problem up until this moment has been that of acquiring enough food to eat, a woman about to face terror, which is even now coming at her from – the Twilight Zone.

== Plot ==
A shabbily dressed old woman lives alone in a remote cabin with no modern conveniences. After hearing a strange, deafening noise above her kitchen, she is accosted by two tiny figures, which appear to be robots or beings wearing pressure suits, small intruders that come from a miniature flying saucer that has landed on her roof.

They attack the woman with small pistol-like weapons that leave radiation burns on her skin. They follow her into her cabin and slash her ankle and hand using her kitchen knife. She eventually is able to wrap one in a blanket and beat it until it is still, then throws it into the burning fireplace. She follows the other to her roof and attacks the saucer-ship with a hatchet.

All this has taken place with no words spoken, but now a voice (director Douglas Heyes) is heard speaking in English from within the craft. The intruder frantically warns that his partner, Gresham, is dead; and that the planet is inhabited by a race of giants impossible to defeat. The ship is marked U.S. Air Force Space Probe No. 1. The invaders were astronauts from Earth; the woman in the small farmhouse belongs to a race of humanoids native to another planet. She destroys the ship and then climbs back down from the roof into the house, exhausted.

== Closing narration ==
These are the invaders, the tiny beings from the tiny place called Earth, who would take the giant step across the sky to the question marks that sparkle and beckon from the vastness of the universe only to be imagined. The invaders...who found out that a one-way ticket to the stars beyond has the ultimate price tag...and we have just seen it entered in a ledger that covers all the transactions in the universe...a bill stamped "Paid in Full" and to be found unfiled in the Twilight Zone.

== On radio ==
When the episode was adapted for the Twilight Zone radio dramas, starring Kathy Garver, the story was changed from an old non-speaking woman to an elderly couple.

== Bibliography ==
- DeVoe, Bill (2008). Trivia from The Twilight Zone. Albany, GA: Bear Manor Media. ISBN 978-1-59393-136-0.
- Grams, Martin (2008). The Twilight Zone: Unlocking the Door to a Television Classic. Churchville, MD: OTR Publishing. ISBN 978-0-9703310-9-0.
- Zicree, Marc Scott (1982). The Twilight Zone Companion (Second ed.). Sillman-James Press.
