= The Whole Truth (The Twilight Zone) =

- The Twilight Zone episode
- Episode no.: Season 2 Episode 14
- Directed by: James Sheldon
- Written by: Rod Serling
- Production code: 173-3664
- Original air date: January 20, 1961

Guest appearances
- Jack Carson; Loring Smith; George Chandler; Jack Ging

Episode chronology
← Previous "Back There"	Next → "The Invaders"
- The Twilight Zone (1959 TV series) (season 2)

"The Whole Truth" is episode 50 of the American television anthology series The Twilight Zone. It originally aired on January 20, 1961, on CBS, on the same day in which John F. Kennedy took office as the 35th president of the United States. It was one of the six episodes of the second season that was shot on videotape in a short-lived experiment aimed to cut costs.

== Opening narration ==
This, as the banner already has proclaimed, is Mr. Harvey Hunnicut, an expert on commerce and con jobs, a brash, bright, and larceny-loaded wheeler and dealer who, when the good Lord passed out a conscience, must have gone for a beer and missed out. And these are a couple of other characters in our story: a little old man and a Model A car – but not just any old man and not just any Model A. There's something very special about the both of them. As a matter of fact, in just a few moments, they'll give Harvey Hunnicut something that he's never experienced before. Through the good offices of a little magic, they will unload on Mr. Hunnicut the absolute necessity to tell the truth. Exactly where they come from is conjecturable, but as to where they're heading for, this we know, because all of them – and you – are on the threshold of The Twilight Zone.

== Plot ==
The dealership of glib used-car salesman Harvey Hunnicut is visited by a mild-mannered elderly gentleman who offers to sell his vintage Ford Model A car for a very low price. Though curious, Harvey accepts it, and only after the paperwork is signed and the ownership transferred does the older man admit that the antique Ford is haunted. Laughing this off, Hunnicut accepts the car, intending to quickly unload it.

To his dismay, he realizes that he is no longer able to lie. He tells a young couple, prospective buyers, that all the cars on his lot are lemons and they should buy from a respectable dealership instead. When explaining to his wife why he's going to be home late, he openly states that he intends to play poker with his friends, which is what he always does when he tells her he is "doing inventory". When Irv, his employee, asks about the raise he was promised, Harvey confesses he always strings his workers along without ever giving raises. Irv punches out Harvey and quits.

Hunnicut concludes that his livelihood depends on his ability to rid himself of this supernatural burden. He's visited by Honest Luther Grimbley, a politician running for reelection, who shows interest in the haunted car despite its flaws. He nearly buys it, but Harvey is compelled to tell him about the car's curse, and Grimbley openly admits that he'd lose his job if he couldn't lie. When Harvey's brutally honest answer about the rest of the cars on the lot convinces Grimbley that the curse is real, he suggests selling the car to someone else who made a living on lies, showing him a newspaper story about the U.S. playing host to visiting Soviet leader Nikita Khrushchev. Surmising that, like every totalitarian state, the Soviet Union owes its existence to a tissue of lies, Hunnicut calls the Soviet embassy and convinces its representatives to visit his dealership. By being absolutely half-truthful, he sells the car as a potential anti-American propaganda tool, exemplifying shoddy, outdated U.S. automobile workmanship.

By the concluding scene, it seems that Hunnicut is about to change the course of history because the passenger watching the sale from the embassy limousine now has his name on paper as the haunted vehicle's owner. It appears to be none other than Khrushchev. Hunnicut telephones Washington, asking if he could possibly get in touch with "Jack Kennedy".

== Closing narration ==
Couldn't happen, you say? Far-fetched? Way-out? Tilt-off-center? Possible. But the next time you buy an automobile, if it happens to look as if it had just gone through the Battle of the Marne, and the seller is ready to throw into the bargain one of his arms, be particularly careful in explaining to the boss about your grandmother's funeral, when you are actually at Chavez Ravine watching the Dodgers. It'll be a fact that you are the proud possessor of an instrument of truth - manufactured and distributed by an exclusive dealer - in The Twilight Zone.

== Cast ==
- Jack Carson as Harvey Hunnicut
- Loring Smith as Honest Luther Grimbley
- George Chandler as car-selling old man
- Jack Ging as young car buyer
- Nan Peterson as young car buyer's wife
- Arte Johnson as Irv
- Patrick Westwood as the premier's aide
- Lee Sabinson as the premier

== Production ==
"The Whole Truth" was one of six Twilight Zone episodes shot on videotape instead of film in an attempt to cut costs. By November 1960, The Twilight Zone's season two had already broadcast five episodes and finished filming 16. However, at a cost of about $65,000 per episode, the show was exceeding its budget. As a result, six consecutive episodes (production code #173-3662 through #173-3667) were videotaped at CBS Television City and eventually transferred to 16-millimeter film ["kinescoped"] for syndicated rebroadcasts. Total savings on editing and cinematography amounted to around $30,000 for all six entries, not enough to justify the loss of depth of visual perspective, which made the shows look like stage-bound live TV dramas (e.g. Playhouse 90, also produced at CBS). The experiment was deemed a failure and never attempted again.

John F. Kennedy was sworn in as the 35th president of the United States hours before this episode originally aired. Jack Carson's final line was one of the rare times that a current president was actually mentioned during an episode of The Twilight Zone.

In The Twilight Zone radio drama adaption of this episode, the character of the Soviet premier was replaced with an emir from the Middle East.

== Reception ==
Zack Handlen, who examined "The Whole Truth" for The A.V. Club in March 2012, viewed it as one of the more comedic episodes of The Twilight Zone, noting that many of the jokes in the episode revolved around stereotypes of dishonest used-car salesmen. Handlen ultimately gave the episode a grade of B−, concluding: "'The Whole Truth' isn't a great half hour of television, but it does benefit from not trying to force in any redemptive moments."

== See also ==
- List of The Twilight Zone (1959 TV series) episodes
- Liar Liar
