= The Lateness of the Hour (The Twilight Zone) =

- The Twilight Zone episode
- Episode no.: Season 2 Episode 8
- Directed by: Jack Smight
- Written by: Rod Serling
- Production code: 173-3662
- Original air date: December 2, 1960

Guest appearances
- Inger Stevens as Jana; John Hoyt as Dr. Loren; Irene Tedrow as Mrs. Loren

Episode chronology
← Previous "Nick of Time"	Next → "The Trouble with Templeton"
- The Twilight Zone (1959 TV series, season 2)

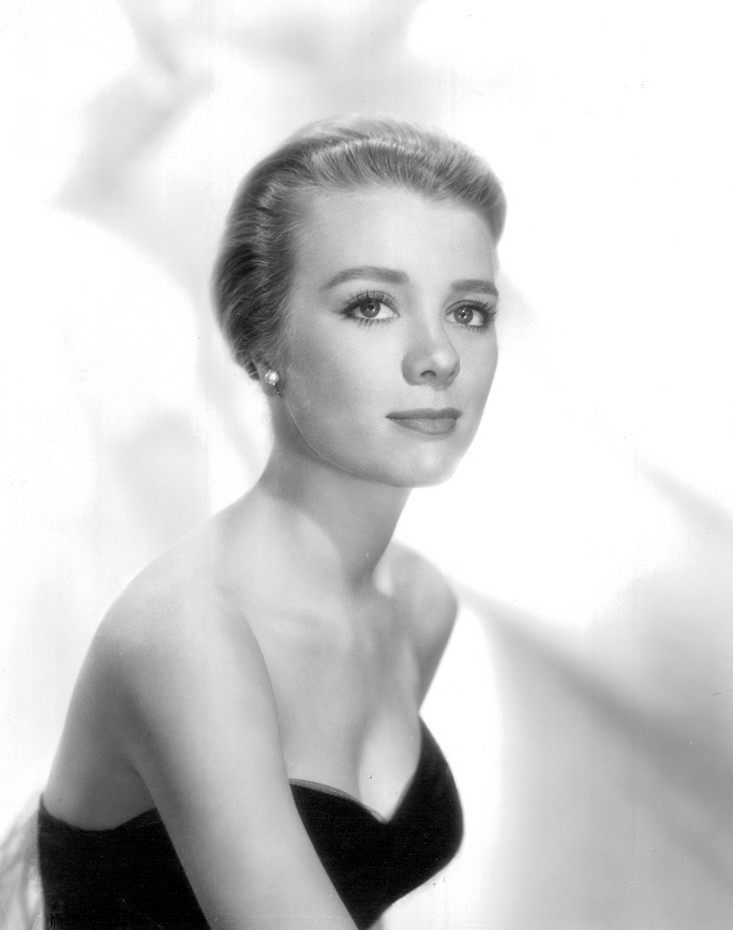
Inger Stevens, 1960

"The Lateness of the Hour" is episode 44 of the American television anthology series The Twilight Zone. It originally aired on December 2, 1960, on CBS. It was one of the six episodes of the second season which was shot on videotape in a short-lived experiment aimed to cut costs. This was Inger Stevens' second starring role in a Twilight Zone episode. Her first was in season one's "The Hitch-Hiker" (episode 16).

== Opening narration ==
The residence of Dr. William Loren, which is in reality a menagerie for machines. We're about to discover that sometimes the product of man's talent and genius can walk amongst us untouched by the normal ravages of time. These are Dr. Loren's robots, built to functional as well as artistic perfection. But in a moment Dr. William Loren, wife and daughter will discover that perfection is relative, that even robots have to be paid for, and very shortly will be shown exactly what is the bill.

== Plot ==
Jana, the sensitive daughter of a creative genius, Dr. William Loren, is distraught over her parents' reliance on her father's five seemingly perfect servants. After Jana pushes one of the maids down the stairs, the maid then gets up without injury, being a robot built by Dr. Loren, complete with programmed memories and personalities. Jana feels trapped, and wishes to go out; her father believes he is protecting her from the outside world, keeping the windows permanently shut.

She implores her father to dismantle the robots before he and her mother become completely dependent on them. Dr. Loren feels that doing so would destroy his work, which he believes is a form of life. He eventually gives in to save his relationship with his daughter, and orders the robots to his basement workshop, where they are to wait to be disassembled. The machines protest, asking how their service was substandard; Dr. Loren again orders them downstairs.

Once the robots are gone, Jana is thrilled and begins looking forward to a new life with traveling, socializing, romance, and children. Her parents react strangely to these happy tidings, and this, combined with realizing that the family photo album contains no pictures of her as a child, prompts Jana to arrive at the shocking awareness that she is a robot. Like the servants, all of her memories were created by Dr. Loren.

Dr. Loren tries to explain that he and his wife were childless and wanted someone to love, and that they see her as their daughter. Jana is convinced that she was built not to be a beloved daughter, but to be merely a prop. She exclaims "I'm a machine" and repeatedly bangs her arm against a railing while yelling "No pain!" She becomes conscious of the fact that she cannot even feel love. This discovery causes Jana such anguish that her "father" recognizes it is not possible for her to go on this way. At some point later, the Lorens are seen relaxing as before, but it is revealed that Dr. Loren has erased Jana's identity and memory and now utilizes her as a replacement for the maid known as Nelda, who gave Mrs. Loren daily shoulder massages.

== Closing narration ==
Let this be the postscript — Should you be worn out by the rigors of competing in a very competitive world, if you're distraught from having to share your existence with the noises and neuroses of the twentieth century, if you crave serenity but want it full time and with no strings attached, get yourself a workroom in the basement, and then drop a note to Dr. and Mrs. William Loren. They're a childless couple who made comfort a life's work, and maybe there are a few do-it-yourself pamphlets still available... in the Twilight Zone.

== Credits ==
- Directed by Jack Smight
- Written by Rod Serling
- Produced by Buck Houghton
- Inger Stevens as Jana
- John Hoyt as Dr. Loren
- Irene Tedrow as Mrs. Loren
- Tom Palmer as Robert
- Mary Gregory as Nelda
- Valley Keene as Suzanne
- Doris Karnes as Gretchen
- Jason Johnson as Jensen

== Production ==
"The Lateness of the Hour" was one of six Twilight Zone episodes shot on videotape instead of film in an attempt to cut costs. By November 1960 The Twilight Zone's season two had already broadcast five episodes and finished filming sixteen. However, at a cost of about $65,000 per episode, the show was exceeding its budget. As a result, six consecutive episodes (production code #173-3662 through #173-3667) were videotaped at CBS Television City and eventually transferred to 16-millimeter film ["kinescoped"] for syndicated rebroadcasts. Total savings on editing and cinematography amounted to only about $30,000 for all six entries, not enough to justify the loss of depth of visual perspective, which made the shows look like stage-bound live TV dramas (such as Playhouse 90, which was also produced at CBS), or even daytime soap operas, which, at the time, were quickly and cheaply produced live on one or two sets. The experiment was deemed a failure and never attempted again.

== See also ==
- List of The Twilight Zone (1959 TV series) episodes

== Sources ==
- DeVoe, Bill. (2008). Trivia from The Twilight Zone. Albany, GA: Bear Manor Media. ISBN 978-1-59393-136-0
- Grams, Martin. (2008). The Twilight Zone: Unlocking the Door to a Television Classic. Churchville, MD: OTR Publishing. ISBN 978-0-9703310-9-0
