= Eye of the Beholder (The Twilight Zone, 1959) =

- The Twilight Zone episode
- Episode no.: Season 2 Episode 6
- Directed by: Douglas Heyes
- Written by: Rod Serling
- Production code: 173-3640
- Original air date: November 11, 1960

Guest appearances
- Maxine Stuart; Donna Douglas; William D. Gordon; Jennifer Howard; Edson Stroll

Episode chronology
← Previous "The Howling Man"	Next → "Nick of Time"
- The Twilight Zone (1959 TV series, season 2)

"Eye of the Beholder" (also titled "The Private World of Darkness" when initially rebroadcast in the summer of 1962) is episode 42 of the American television anthology series The Twilight Zone. It originally aired on November 11, 1960, on CBS.

== Opening narration ==
Suspended in time and space for a moment, your introduction to Miss Janet Tyler, who lives in a very private world of darkness. A universe whose dimensions are the size, thickness, length of the swath of bandages that cover her face. In a moment, we will go back into this room, and also in a moment we will look under those bandages. Keeping in mind of course that we are not to be surprised by what we see, because this isn't just a hospital, and this patient 307 is not just a woman. This happens to be the Twilight Zone, and Miss Janet Tyler, with you, is about to enter it.

== Plot summary ==
Janet Tyler has undergone her eleventh treatment—the maximum number legally allowed by the "State"—in an attempt to look normal. Her head is completely bandaged so that her face is entirely covered, and her face is described as a "pitiful twisted lump of flesh" by the nurses and doctor, lurking in the shadows of the darkened hospital room. The outcome of the procedure cannot be known until the bandages are removed. Unable to bear the bandages any longer, Janet pleads with the doctor and eventually convinces him to remove them early. As he prepares, the nurse says that she still is uneasy about Janet's appearance. The doctor becomes displeased and questions why Janet or anyone must be judged on their outer beauty. The nurse warns him not to continue in that vein, as it is considered treason.

The doctor removes the bandages and announces that the procedure has failed, her face having undergone no change. Janet is revealed to be a beautiful woman by contemporary standards while the hospital staff all possess monstrous faces with drooping features, large, thick brows, sunken-in eyes, swollen and twisted lips, and wrinkled noses with pig snout-like nostrils. Distraught by the procedure's failure, Janet tries to escape until a similarly attractive man named Walter Smith arrives to take her to a village of "[her] own kind" where they will not trouble the State. As he does so, he assures her that while the State's society find her ugly, others will find her beautiful.

== Closing narration ==
Now the questions that come to mind: "Where is this place and when is it?" "What kind of world where ugliness is the norm and beauty the deviation from that norm?" You want an answer? The answer is it doesn't make any difference, because the old saying happens to be true. Beauty is in the eye of the beholder, in this year or a hundred years hence. On this planet or wherever there is human life—perhaps out amongst the stars—beauty is in the eye of the beholder. Lesson to be learned in the Twilight Zone.

== Cast ==
- Maxine Stuart as Janet Tyler (under bandages)
- Donna Douglas as Janet Tyler (unmasked)
- William D. Gordon as Doctor Bernardi
- Jennifer Howard as Nurse
- Edson Stroll as Walter Smith
- George Keymas as The Leader
- Joanna Heyes as Nurse #2

== Production ==
Because of the complex makeup and camera angles, this was one of the most difficult episodes of The Twilight Zone to film. The director, Douglas Heyes, wanted the show to feature actors with sympathetic voices. To achieve this, he cast the episode with his back to the performers. Maxine Stuart spoke all the lines of the main character Janet Tyler, when her head is entirely covered by bandages.

The original title for this episode was "Eye of the Beholder". Stuart Reynolds, a television producer, threatened to sue writer and producer Rod Serling for the use of the title. At the time, Reynolds was selling an educational film of the same name to public schools. Reruns following the initial broadcast featured the title screen "The Private World of Darkness". Because CBS consulted different prints over the years for syndication packages, the closing credits for this episode vary from one title to the other, depending on which television station is using which package. In The Twilight Zone's original DVD release the syndicated version was marketed as an "alternate version". Other than the appearance of the title in the closing credits, however, there are no differences between the two versions.

Serling, who wrote the episode, reused the theme for a later teleplay, "The Different Ones", for his series Night Gallery. "The Different Ones" takes place in a futuristic world where a disfigured hermit teenage boy is sent on a NASA rocket to a planet where the inhabitants are revealed to look like him. During the transfer he meets a conventionally handsome alien youth, who is going to Earth because of his own "disfigurement".

== 2003 remake ==
This episode was remade for the 2002–03 revival of the series using Serling's original script (but discarding Bernard Herrmann's original score), with Molly Sims as Janet Tyler, Reggie Hayes as Dr. Bernardi and Roger Cross as the Leader. The make-up was changed to make the faces look more melted, ghoulish and decayed with deep ridges. The remake follows the original script more faithfully. The projection screens were changed to plasma screens and more of the dialogue from the Leader's monologue was used.

== See also ==
- List of Twilight Zone (1959 TV series) episodes
- Weird Science #21 Sep/Oct 1953, "The Ugly One"

== Bibliography ==
- Zicree, Marc Scott. The Twilight Zone Companion. Sillman-James Press, 1982 (second edition).
- DeVoe, Bill. (2008). Trivia from The Twilight Zone. Albany, GA: Bear Manor Media. ISBN 978-1-59393-136-0
- Grams, Martin. (2008). The Twilight Zone: Unlocking the Door to a Television Classic. Churchville, MD: OTR Publishing. ISBN 978-0-9703310-9-0
