= Marius Constant =

Romanian-born French composer and conductor (1925 - 2004)

- Born: 7 February 1925; Bucharest, Romania
- Died: 15 May 2004 (aged 79); Paris, France
- Occupations: composer, arranger, conductor
- Era: 20th century

Marius Constant (7 February 1925 – 15 May 2004) was a Romanian-born French composer and conductor. Although known in the classical world primarily for his ballet scores, his most widely known music was the iconic guitar theme for The Twilight Zone American television series.

== Career ==
Constant was born in Bucharest, Romania, and studied piano and composition at the Bucharest Conservatory, receiving the George Enescu Award in 1944. In 1946, he moved to Paris, studying at the Conservatoire de Paris with Olivier Messiaen, Tony Aubin, Arthur Honegger and Nadia Boulanger. His compositions earned several prizes, including the Prix Italia in 1952 for his composition Le joueur de flûte. From 1950 on, he was increasingly involved with electronic music and joined Pierre Schaeffer's Groupe de Recherche de Musique Concrète.

From 1956 to 1966, Constant conducted at the Ballets de Paris, then directed by Roland Petit. To this period belong the numerous ballet scores for Petit and Maurice Béjart, namely: Haut-voltage (1956), Contrepointe (1958), Cyrano de Bergerac (1959), Éloge de la folie (1966) and Paradis perdu (1967). For the 1957 Aix-en-Provence Festival, he wrote a piano concerto, but won wider recognition for the premiere, conducted by Leonard Bernstein, of 24 Préludes pour Orchestre (1958). Turner (1961) was a tone poem inspired by the English painter William Turner.

In the late 1950s, Constant was commissioned by Lud Gluskin of CBS to create a number of short pieces for the CBS stock music library that could be used in CBS radio and TV shows. The unusual, sometimes discordant nature of Constant's work meant that the pieces were seldom heard or used. In 1960, Gluskin was asked to find a new theme for the main title and end credits of the CBS television series The Twilight Zone, then entering its second season, to replace the original one by Bernard Herrmann. New pieces submitted by Herrmann, Jerry Goldsmith, Leith Stevens, and others, were considered unsuitable. In desperation, Gluskin edited together two pieces by Constant ("Étrange No. 3", a series of repeated four-note phrases on electric guitar, and "Milieu No. 2", an odd pattern of guitar notes, bongo drums, brass and flutes). The resulting theme quickly became iconic, and is easily Constant's most well-known work. Constant himself was apparently unaware for some years that his music was being used as The Twilight Zone theme. Because the music was part of a "work made for hire" agreement with CBS, Constant derived no ongoing income from it.

In 1963, Constant founded the pioneering Ensemble Ars Nova. In 1970, he took over the musical direction of the ORTF; from 1973 to 1978 he directed at the Paris Opera, and in 1988 and 1989 was Professor of Orchestration at the Paris Conservatory. Besides these appointments, he taught at Stanford University and in Hilversum. Later ballets include Septentrion (1975), Nana (1976) and L'ange bleu (1985). La tragédie de Carmen (1981), his adaptation of Bizet's opera for director Peter Brook, was an international success.

Composed in 1981, 103 Regards dans l'eau is a violin concerto with 103 titled 'movements' in four main sections, inspired by "poetic celebrations of water" taken from a variety of literary and scientific sources. In 1983, he wrote a Symphonie based on Claude Debussy's opera Pelléas et Mélisande. In 1987, he arranged the orchestral music for the ballet Les mariés de la tour Eiffel, a pastiche by various French composers, for an ensemble of 15 instruments. In 1990, he also made an orchestral arrangement of the piano composition Gaspard de la nuit by Maurice Ravel. He returned to Debussy's Pelleas in 1992 when he abridged and arranged Debussy's score for two pianos in a Peter Brook production entitled Impressions of Pelleas.

He died in Paris in 2004, aged 79, and is buried at Ivry Cemetery, Ivry-sur-Seine.

== Selected filmography ==
- The Road to Damascus (1952)
- Koenigsmark (1953)
