= James Sheldon =

American television director

- Born: Leonard James Schleifer; November 12, 1920; Manhattan, New York, U.S.
- Died: March 12, 2016 (aged 95); Manhattan, New York, U.S.
- Education: University of North Carolina
- Occupation: Television director
- Years active: 1952–1986
- Children: 2

Leonard James Schleifer, also known as James Sheldon (November 12, 1920 – March 12, 2016), was an American television director.

Sheldon directed for television programs including The Twilight Zone, The Fugitive, The Donna Reed Show, The Millionaire, Death Valley Days, Route 66, The Love Boat, M*A*S*H, The Dukes of Hazzard, Gunsmoke, Bridget Loves Bernie, Room 222, Harbor Command, Love, American Style, The Waltons, The Virginian, That Girl. The Man from U.N.C.L.E., My Three Sons, Petticoat Junction, Naked City and Sledge Hammer!. He died in March 2016 at his home in Manhattan, New York from complications of cancer, at the age of 95.

In an interview with novelist Matthew Rettenmund in 2015, Sheldon spoke candidly about his bisexuality, his relationships with actress Loretta Young and actor Clark Gable's daughter Judy Lewis and Ernst Lubitsch's daughter Nicola Lubitsch, discovering Troy Donohue, and his friendships with Tony Randall and James Dean.
