= The Twilight Zone =

American TV anthology series (1959–1964)

- Genre: Anthology; Fantasy; Horror; Science fiction
- Created by: Rod Serling
- Presented by: Rod Serling
- Composers: Bernard Herrmann (also season 1 theme); Marius Constant (theme from season 2 onwards); Jerry Goldsmith; Fred Steiner; Leith Stevens; Leonard Rosenman; Franz Waxman
- Country of origin: United States
- No. of seasons: 5
- No. of episodes: 156 (list of episodes)

Production
- Executive producer: Rod Serling
- Producers: Buck Houghton (1959–1962); Herbert Hirschman (1963); Bert Granet (1963–1964); William Froug (1963–1964)
- Cinematography: George T. Clemens
- Running time: 25 minutes (seasons 1–3, 5); 51 minutes (season 4)
- Production companies: Cayuga Productions; CBS Productions

Original release
- Network: CBS
- Release: October 2, 1959 – June 19, 1964

Related
- The Twilight Zone (1985–1989); The Twilight Zone (2002–2003); The Twilight Zone (2019–2020)

The Twilight Zone (marketed as Twilight Zone for its final two seasons) is an American anthology television series created and presented by Rod Serling, which ran for five seasons on CBS from October 2, 1959, to June 19, 1964. Each episode presents a standalone story in which characters find themselves dealing with often disturbing or unusual events, an experience described as entering "the Twilight Zone", often with a surprise ending and a moral. The phrase "twilight zone" has entered the vernacular, used to describe surreal experiences.

The series featured both established stars and younger actors who became much better known later. Serling served as executive producer and head writer; he wrote or co-wrote 92 of the show's 156 episodes. He was also the show's host and narrator, delivering monologues at the beginning and end of each episode, and typically appeared on-screen to address the audience directly during the opening scene. Serling's opening and closing narrations usually summarize the episode's events, encapsulating how and why the main characters have entered the Twilight Zone.

== Development ==
By the late 1950s, Rod Serling was a prominent name in American television. His successful television plays included "Patterns" (for Kraft Television Theatre) and "Requiem for a Heavyweight" (for Playhouse 90), but he was frustrated by constant changes and edits made by the networks and sponsors. In "Requiem", the line "Got a match?" had to be cut because the sponsor sold lighters; other programs had similar striking of words that might remind viewers of competitors to the sponsor, including one case in which the sponsor, Ford Motor Company, had the Chrysler Building removed from a picture of the New York City skyline.

According to comments in his 1957 anthology Patterns, Serling had been trying to delve into material more controversial than his works of the early 1950s. This led to Noon on Doomsday for the United States Steel Hour in 1956, a commentary by Serling on the defensiveness and total lack of repentance he saw in the Mississippi town where the murder of Emmett Till took place. His original script closely paralleled the Till case, then was moved out of the South and the victim changed to a Jewish pawnbroker, and eventually became just a foreigner in an unnamed town.

Serling thought that a science fiction setting would give him more freedom and less interference in expressing controversial ideas than more realistic settings. "The Time Element" was Serling's 1957 pilot pitch for his show, a time travel adventure about a man who goes back to Honolulu in 1941 and unsuccessfully tries to warn everyone about the impending attack on Pearl Harbor. The script was rejected and shelved until Bert Granet discovered and produced it as an episode of Desilu Playhouse in 1958. The show was a great success and enabled Serling to begin production on The Twilight Zone. Per the BFI Film Classics library, "the cruel indifference and implacability of fate and the irony of poetic justice" were motifs for Serling.

== Episodes ==
Season	Episodes	Originally released	
Season	Episodes	First released	Last released
Concept		November 24, 1958	
1	36	October 2, 1959	July 1, 1960
2	29	September 30, 1960	June 2, 1961
3	37	September 15, 1961	June 1, 1962
4	18	January 3, 1963	May 23, 1963
5	36	September 27, 1963	June 19, 1964

=== Season 1 (1959–1960) ===
There is a fifth dimension, beyond that which is known to man. It is a dimension as vast as space and as timeless as infinity. It is the middle ground between light and shadow, between science and superstition, and it lies between the pit of man's fears and the summit of his knowledge. This is the dimension of imagination. It is an area which we call The Twilight Zone.

— Rod Serling

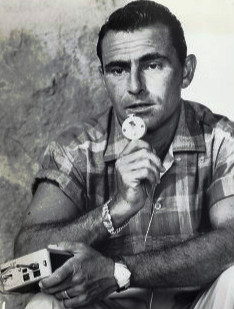
Serling working on his script with a dictating machine, 1959

The Twilight Zone premiered on October 2, 1959, to rave reviews. "Twilight Zone is about the only show on the air that I actually look forward to seeing. It's the one series that I will let interfere with other plans", said Terry Turner for the Chicago Daily News. Daily Variety ranked it with "the best that has ever been accomplished in half-hour filmed television" and the New York Herald Tribune found the show to be "certainly the best and most original anthology series of the year".

While the show proved popular with television critics, it struggled to find a receptive audience. CBS was banking on a rating of at least 21 or 22, but its initial numbers were much worse. The series' future was jeopardized when its third episode, "Mr. Denton on Doomsday" earned a 16.3 rating. Still, the show attracted a large enough audience to survive a brief hiatus in November, after which it finally surpassed its competition on ABC and NBC and persuaded its sponsors (General Foods and Kimberly-Clark) to stay on until the end of the season. However, by the end of the first season the show "seemed doomed" by some.

Both sponsors appeared ready to pull out. Even if the show continued, CBS was said to be planning to replace Serling with a more prestigious host and narrator, even offering it to Orson Welles. In the end everything was worked out. Only Kimberly-Clark dropped their sponsorship, and Colgate-Palmolive stepped in as the replacement sponsor. Orson Welles turned down the offer to do the show. While this was taking place Serling went to New York, hoping to at least preserve the right to do the closing narration. To his surprise the network did a complete reversal. Instead of dropping him, it expanded his role as host, by having him also do an opening introduction.

With the exception of "The Chaser", the first season featured scripts written by Rod Serling, Charles Beaumont and Richard Matheson. The trio was responsible for 127 of the 156 episodes in the series. With the exception of "A World of His Own", Serling never appeared on camera during any first-season episode, as he would in future seasons, present only as a voice-over narrator. Serling appeared on screen in Twilight Zone promotional spots plugging the following week's episode – just not in the episodes themselves. These promo spots were unseen for several decades after their initial airings. While many have been released in the DVD and Blu-ray releases of The Twilight Zone, a few are lost completely and some survive only as audio tracks. Most are available through Paramount+ when watching the full episodes.

Many of the season's episodes proved to be among the series' most celebrated, including "Time Enough at Last", "The Monsters Are Due on Maple Street", "Walking Distance", and "The After Hours". The first season won Serling an unprecedented fourth Emmy Award for dramatic writing, a Producers Guild Award for Serling's creative partner Buck Houghton, a Directors Guild Award for John Brahm and the Hugo Award for best dramatic presentation.

Bernard Herrmann's original opening theme music lasted throughout the first season. For the final five episodes of the season, the show's original surrealist "pit and summit" opening montage and narration was replaced by a piece featuring an eye that closed, revealing the setting sun, and shorter narration, and a truncated version of Herrmann's theme.

Some first-season episodes were available for decades only in a version with a pasted-on second-season opening. These "re-themed" episodes were prepared for airing in the summer of 1961 as summer repeats; the producers wanted to have a consistent opening for the show every week. During the original 1959/60 run, Herrmann's theme was used in every first-season episode. The first season openings for these episodes have since been restored to recent DVD and Blu-ray reissues although incorrect openings were restored on two episodes, "Mr. Denton on Doomsday" and "A Passage for Trumpet".

=== Season 2 (1960–1961) ===
You're traveling through another dimension, a dimension not only of sight and sound but of mind; a journey into a wondrous land whose boundaries are that of imagination. That's the signpost up ahead—your next stop, the Twilight Zone.

— Rod Serling

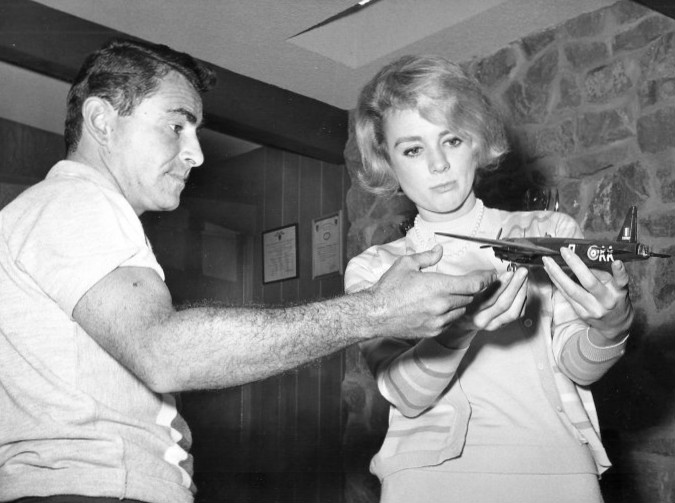
Serling models an airplane with actress Inger Stevens, who appeared in "The Hitch-Hiker" and "The Lateness of the Hour".

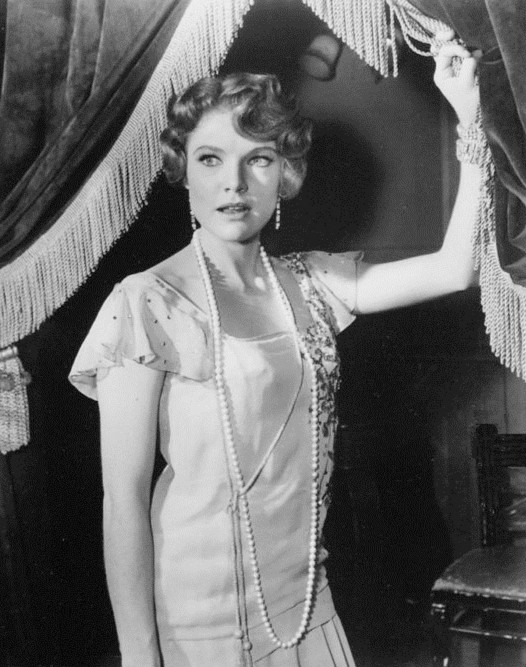
Pippa Scott in "The Trouble With Templeton"

The second season premiered on September 30, 1960, with "King Nine Will Not Return," Serling's fresh take on the pilot episode "Where Is Everybody?" The familiarity of this first story stood in stark contrast to the novelty of the show's new packaging: Bernard Herrmann's stately original theme was replaced by Marius Constant's more jarring and dissonant (and now more-familiar) guitar-and-bongo theme. The closing eye was replaced by a more surreal introduction inspired by the new images in Serling's narration (such as "That's the signpost up ahead"), and Serling himself stepped in front of the cameras to present his opening narration, rather than being only a voice-over narrator (as in the first season). The openings of the first three episodes of the season retained the eye opening's narration.

A new sponsor, Colgate-Palmolive, replaced the previous year's Kimberly-Clark (as Liggett & Myers would succeed General Foods, in April 1961), and a new network executive, James Aubrey, took over CBS. "Jim Aubrey was a very, very difficult problem for the show," said associate producer Del Reisman. "He was particularly tough on The Twilight Zone because for its time it was a particularly costly half-hour show... Aubrey was real tough on [the show's budget] even when it was a small number of dollars." In a push to keep the show's expenses down, Aubrey ordered that seven fewer episodes be produced than last season and that six of those being produced would be shot on videotape rather than film, a move Serling disliked, calling it "neither fish nor fowl." Two additional episodes filmed in the second season ("The Grave" and "Nothing in the Dark") were held over to the third season.

Season two saw the production of many of the series' most acclaimed episodes, including "Eye of the Beholder", "Nick of Time", "The Invaders", "The Trouble With Templeton" and "Will the Real Martian Please Stand Up?". The trio of Serling, Matheson and Beaumont began to admit new writers, and this season saw the television debut of George Clayton Johnson. Emmys were won by Serling (his fifth) for dramatic writing and by director of photography George T. Clemens and, for the second year in a row, the series won the Hugo Award for best dramatic presentation. It also earned the Unity Award for "Outstanding Contributions to Better Race Relations" and an Emmy nomination for "Outstanding Program Achievement in the Field of Drama." The Twilight Zone was mentioned in Newton Minow's landmark 1961 speech "Television and the Public Interest" as one of the few quality television series on the air at the time in a "vast wasteland" of mass-produced junk, with Minow praising the series as "dramatic and moving."

Five weeks into season two, the show's budget was showing a deficit. The total number of new episodes was projected at twenty-nine, more than half of which, sixteen, had already been filmed by November 1960. As a cost-cutting measure, six episodes ("The Lateness of The Hour", "The Night of the Meek", "The Whole Truth", "Twenty Two", "Static" and "Long Distance Call") were produced in the cheaper videotape format, which also required fewer camera movements. In addition, videotape was a relatively primitive medium in the early 1960s; the editing of tape was next to impossible. Each of the episodes was, therefore "camera-cut" as in live TV—on a studio sound stage, using a total of four cameras. The requisite multi-camera setup of the videotape experiment made location shooting difficult, severely limiting the potential scope of the story-lines. Even with those artistic sacrifices, the eventual savings amounted to only $6,000 per episode, far less than the cost of a single episode. The experiment was not attempted again. Kinescope versions of the videotaped episodes were rerun in syndication.

=== Season 3 (1961–1962) ===
You're traveling through another dimension, a dimension not only of sight and sound but of mind; a journey into a wondrous land whose boundaries are that of imagination. Your next stop... the Twilight Zone.

— Rod Serling

In his third year as executive producer, host, narrator and primary writer for The Twilight Zone, Serling was beginning to feel exhausted: "I've never felt quite so drained of ideas as I do at this moment". In the first two seasons he contributed 48 scripts, or 73% of the show's total output; he contributed 56% of this season's output. "The show now seems to be feeding off itself", said a Variety reviewer of the season's episode two. Sponsors for this season included Chesterfield, Bufferin tablets, and Pepsi-Cola.

Despite his avowed weariness, Serling again managed to produce several teleplays that are widely regarded as classics, including "It's a Good Life", "To Serve Man", "Little Girl Lost" and "Five Characters in Search of an Exit". Scripts by Montgomery Pittman and Earl Hamner, Jr. supplemented Matheson and Beaumont's output, and George Clayton Johnson submitted three teleplays that examined complex themes. The episode "I Sing the Body Electric" was written by Ray Bradbury. By the end of the season, the series had reached over 100 episodes.

The Twilight Zone received two Emmy nominations (for cinematography and art design), but was awarded neither. It again received the Hugo Award for "Best Dramatic Presentation", making it the only three-time recipient until it was tied by Doctor Who in 2008.

In spring 1962, The Twilight Zone was late in finding a sponsor for its fourth season and was replaced on CBS's fall schedule with a new hour-long situation comedy called Fair Exchange. In the confusion that followed this apparent cancellation, producer Buck Houghton left the series for a position at Four Star Productions. Serling meanwhile accepted a teaching post at Antioch College, his alma mater. Though the series was eventually renewed, Serling's contribution as executive producer decreased in its final seasons.

=== Season 4 (1963) ===
You unlock this door with the key of imagination. Beyond it is another dimension: a dimension of sound, a dimension of sight, a dimension of mind. You're moving into a land of both shadow and substance, of things and ideas; you've just crossed over into the Twilight Zone.

— Rod Serling

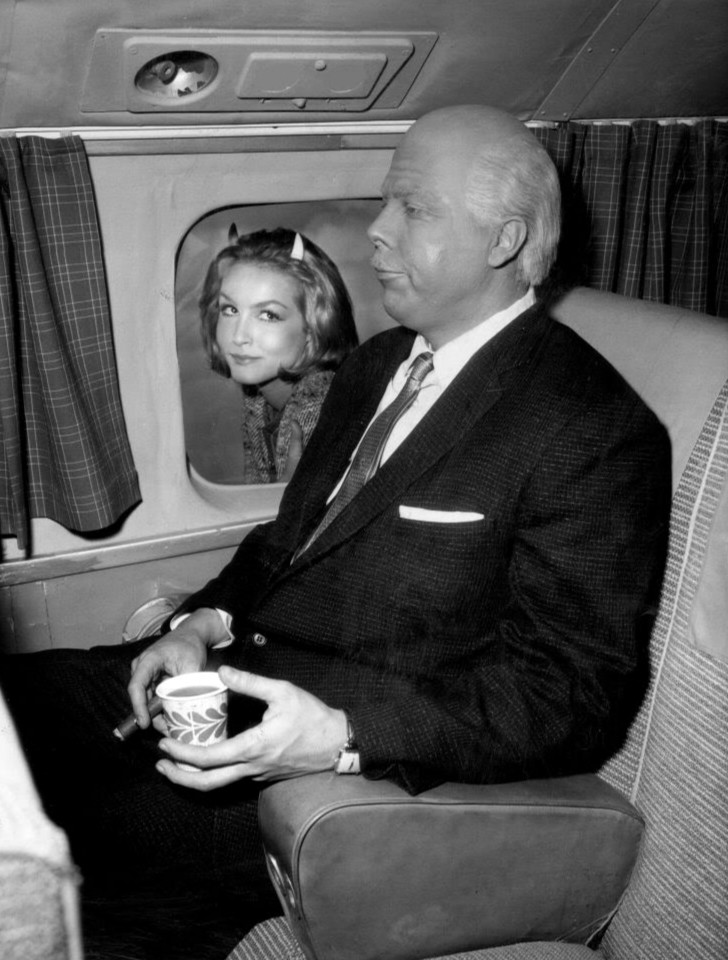
Julie Newmar and Albert Salmi in "Of Late I Think of Cliffordville"

In November 1962, CBS contracted Twilight Zone (now sans The) as a mid-season January replacement for Fair Exchange, the very show that replaced it in the September 1962 schedule. In order to fill the Fair Exchange time slot, each episode had to be expanded to an hour, an idea which did not sit well with Serling, nor the production crew. "Ours is the perfect half-hour show... If we went to an hour, we'd have to fleshen our stories, soap opera style. Viewers could watch fifteen minutes without knowing whether they were in a Twilight Zone or Desilu Playhouse," Serling responded. Herbert Hirschman was hired to replace long-time producer Buck Houghton. One of Hirschman's first decisions was to direct a new opening sequence, this one illustrating a door, eye, window and other objects suspended in space. His second task was to find and produce quality scripts. Sponsors included Johnson & Johnson.

This season of Twilight Zone once again turned to the reliable trio of Serling, Matheson and Beaumont. However, Serling's input was limited this season; he still provided the majority of the teleplays, but as executive producer, he was virtually absent and as host, his artful narrations had to be shot back-to-back against a gray background during his infrequent trips to Los Angeles. Due to complications from a developing brain disease, Beaumont's input also began to diminish significantly. Additional scripts were commissioned from Earl Hamner, Jr. and Reginald Rose to fill in the gap.

With five episodes left in the season, Hirschman received an offer to work on a new NBC series called Espionage and was replaced by Bert Granet, who had previously produced "The Time Element". Among Granet's first assignments was "On Thursday We Leave for Home", which Serling considered the season's most effective episode. There was an Emmy nomination for cinematography and a nomination for the Hugo Award.

=== Season 5 (1963–1964) ===
Serling later claimed, "I was writing so much, I felt I had begun to lose my perspective on what was good and what was bad". By the end of this final season, he had contributed 92 scripts in five years. This season, the new alternate sponsors were American Tobacco and Procter & Gamble. The show returned to its half-hour format.

Beaumont was now out of the picture almost entirely, contributing scripts only through the ghostwriters Jerry Sohl and John Tomerlin, and after producing only 13 episodes, Bert Granet left and was replaced by William Froug—with whom Serling had worked on Playhouse 90.

William Shatner in "Nightmare at 20,000 Feet"

Froug made a number of unpopular decisions; first by shelving several scripts purchased under Granet's term (including Matheson's "The Doll," which was nominated for a Writer's Guild Award when finally produced in 1986 on Amazing Stories); secondly, Froug alienated George Clayton Johnson when he hired Richard deRoy to completely rewrite Johnson's teleplay Tick of Time, eventually produced as "Ninety Years Without Slumbering." "It makes the plot trivial," complained Johnson of the resulting script, insisting he be given screen credit for the final version of the episode as "Johnson Smith." Tick of Time became Johnson's final submission to The Twilight Zone.

Even under these conditions, several episodes were produced that are well remembered, including "Nightmare at 20,000 Feet", "A Kind of a Stopwatch", "The Masks" and "Living Doll." Although this season received no Emmy recognition, An Occurrence at Owl Creek Bridge—a 1962 French short film which was modified slightly for broadcast—received the Academy Award for best short film in 1963. It was based on the short story of the same name by Ambrose Bierce; Serling introduces it as "a haunting study of the incredible from the past master of the incredible."

In late January 1964, CBS announced the show's cancellation. "For one reason or other, Jim Aubrey decided he was sick of the show... [H]e claimed that it was too far over budget and that the ratings weren't good enough", explained Froug. But Serling countered by telling the Daily Variety that he had "decided to cancel the network". ABC showed interest in bringing Serling over to their network to write a more explicitly horror-themed series, Witches, Warlocks and Werewolves, but Serling was not impressed. "The network executives seem to prefer weekly ghouls, and we have what appears to be a considerable difference in opinion. I don't mind my show being supernatural, but I don't want to be booked into a graveyard every week." Shortly afterwards, Serling sold his 40% share in The Twilight Zone to CBS, leaving the show and all projects involving the supernatural behind him until 1969, when Night Gallery debuted.

== Casting ==
Being an anthology series with no recurring characters, The Twilight Zone featured an array of guest stars, some of whom appeared in multiple episodes. The show features early performances from actors who became famous, among them Theodore Bikel, Bill Bixby, Lloyd Bochner, Morgan Brittany, Charles Bronson, Carol Burnett, Donna Douglas, Robert Duvall, Buddy Ebsen, Peter Falk, Constance Ford, Joan Hackett, Dennis Hopper, Ron Howard, Jim Hutton, Jack Klugman, Martin Landau, Cloris Leachman, Jean Marsh, Elizabeth Montgomery, Billy Mumy, Julie Newmar, Barbara Nichols, Leonard Nimoy, Robert Redford, Burt Reynolds, Janice Rule, Telly Savalas, William Shatner, Dean Stockwell, George Takei, Joyce Van Patten, Jack Warden, Jonathan Winters, and Dick York.

Other episodes feature performances by actors later in their careers, such as Dana Andrews, Joan Blondell, Ann Blyth, Art Carney, Jack Carson, Gladys Cooper, William Demarest, Andy Devine, Cedric Hardwicke, Josephine Hutchinson, Buster Keaton, Ida Lupino, Lee Marvin, Kevin McCarthy, Roddy McDowall, Burgess Meredith, Agnes Moorehead, Alan Napier, Franchot Tone, Mickey Rooney, and Ed Wynn. Klugman, Meredith, and John Anderson are tied for the most starring roles, with a record of four episodes.

Character actors who appeared (some more than once) include John Dehner, Cyril Delevanti, Betty Garde, Sandra Gould, Nancy Kulp, Celia Lovsky, Eve McVeagh, Nehemiah Persoff, Albert Salmi, Vito Scotti, Olan Soule, Harold J. Stone, and Estelle Winwood. Actor Robert McCord appeared in 32 episodes, though almost all of them in uncredited roles.

== Music ==
Besides Bernard Herrmann and Jerry Goldsmith, other contributors to the music were Nathan Van Cleave, Leonard Rosenman, Fred Steiner, and Franz Waxman. The first season featured an orchestral title theme by Herrmann, who also wrote original scores for seven of the episodes, including the premiere, "Where Is Everybody?". The guitar theme most associated with the show was written by the French avant-garde composer Marius Constant as part of a series of short cues commissioned by CBS as "work made for hire" library music for the series. The guitar player was Howard Roberts. Used from season two onward, the theme as aired was a splicing together of two of these library cues: "Etrange 3 (Strange No. 3)" and "Milieu 2 (Middle No. 2)". Varèse Sarabande released several albums of music from the series, focusing on the episodes that received original scores.

Volume 1

1. Main Title Theme – Marius Constant (:27)
2. The Invaders – Jerry Goldsmith (12:57)
3. Perchance to Dream – Nathan Van Cleave (9:52)
4. Walking Distance – Bernard Herrmann (12:52)
5. The Sixteen-Millimeter Shrine – Franz Waxman (10:55)
6. End Title Theme – Marius Constant (:42)

Volume 2

1. Main Title Theme – Bernard Herrmann (1:11)
2. Where Is Everybody? – Bernard Herrmann (11:19)
3. 100 Yards Over the Rim – Fred Steiner (12:14)
4. The Big Tall Wish – Jerry Goldsmith (11:52)
5. A Stop at Willoughby – Nathan Scott (12:24)
6. End Title Theme – Bernard Herrmann (1:05)

Volume 3

1. Alternate Main Title Theme – Marius Constant (:38)
2. Back There – Jerry Goldsmith (12:51)
3. And When the Sky Was Opened – Leonard Rosenman (11:54)
4. A World of Difference – Nathan Van Cleave (11:48)
5. The Lonely – Bernard Herrmann (11:09)
6. Alternate End Title – Marius Constant (:54)

Volume 4

1. Alternate Main Title – Bernard Herrmann (:28)
2. Jazz Theme One – Jerry Goldsmith (9:12)
3. Jazz Theme Two – Jerry Goldsmith (3:12)
4. Jazz Theme Three – Rene Garriguenc (4:04)
5. Nervous Man in a Four Dollar Room – Jerry Goldsmith (8:16)
6. Elegy – Nathan Van Cleave (8:14)
7. King Nine Will Not Return – Fred Steiner (11:11)
8. Two – Nathan Van Cleave (12:09)
9. Alternate End Title – Bernard Herrmann (:43)

Volume 5

1. Alternate Main Title #2 – Bernard Herrmann (:29)
2. I Sing the Body Electric – Nathan Van Cleave (11:41)
3. The Passerby – Fred Steiner (12:58)
4. The Trouble with Templeton – Jeff Alexander (11:46)
5. Dust – Jerry Goldsmith (11:33)
6. Alternate End Title #2 – Bernard Herrmann (1:07)

Many of the above were included on a four-disc set released by Silva America. Varese also released a two-disc set of re-recordings of Herrmann's seven scores for the series ("Where Is Everybody?", "Walking Distance", "The Lonely", "Eye of the Beholder", "Little Girl Lost", "Living Doll", and "Ninety Years Without Slumbering"), conducted by Joel McNeely. Alongside this release, Bernard Herrmann's score for the episode "Walking Distance" received another re-recording accompanying a new recording of his score for François Truffaut's Fahrenheit 451 performed by the Moscow Symphony Orchestra, conducted by William T. Stromberg and released by Tribute Film Classics.

== Broadcast history ==
Season	Time slot
1 (1959–1960)	Friday at 10:00-10:30 pm E.T.
2 (1960–1961)	Friday at 10:00-10:30 pm E.T.
3 (1961–1962)	Friday at 10:00-10:30 pm E.T.
4 (1963)	Thursday at 9:00-10:00 pm E.T.
5 (1963–1964)	Friday at 9:30-10:00 pm E.T.

== Legacy ==
The Twilight Zone is widely regarded as one of the greatest television series of all time. In 2002, the series was ranked No. 26 on TV Guide's 50 Greatest TV Shows of All Time. In 2004, it was ranked No. 8 on TV Guide's Top Cult Shows Ever, moving to No. 9 three years later. In 2013, the Writers Guild of America ranked it as the third-best-written TV series ever and TV Guide ranked it the fourth greatest drama, the second greatest sci-fi show and the fifth greatest show of all time.

In 2016, it was ranked No. 7 on Rolling Stone's list of the 100 greatest shows of all time and was ranked No. 12 in 2022. In 2023, Variety ranked The Twilight Zone #14 on its list of the 100 greatest TV shows of all time. In 2024, Boston Globe television critic Matthew Gilbert stated that the show "is still TV’s most influential series six decades after it ended".

In 1997, "To Serve Man" and "It's a Good Life" were ranked at 11 and 31 on TV Guide's 100 Greatest Episodes of All Time. Serling himself named "The Invaders" and "Time Enough at Last" as his favorites.

== Awards and nominations ==
The Twilight Zone was nominated for four Primetime Emmy Awards, winning twice for Outstanding Writing Achievement in Drama.

Year	Association	Category	Nominee	Result
1960	Primetime Emmy Awards	Outstanding Writing Achievement in Drama	Rod Serling	Won
1961	Primetime Emmy Awards	Outstanding Program Achievement in the Field of Drama	The Twilight Zone	Nominated
1961	Primetime Emmy Awards	Outstanding Writing Achievement in Drama	Rod Serling	Won
1962	Primetime Emmy Awards	Outstanding Writing Achievement in Drama	Rod Serling	Nominated
1963	Golden Globe Awards	Best TV Producer/Director	Rod Serling	Won

== In media ==
=== 1961 LP record release ===
In that year, Marty Manning and His Orchestra released an LP record The Twilight Zone: A Sound Adventure in Space on Columbia Records. It was recorded with top New York City session musicians, including Mundell Lowe (guitar), Jerry Murad (harmonica), Harry Breuer (vibraphone), and Phil Kraus (percussion). Lyric soprano Lois Hunt provided the wordless vocals, and Teo Macero was credited with special effects. Manning was credited with playing the serpent, Ondioline, and Ondes Martenot.

The first track was the title theme. The other tracks and their writers, were:

==== side A ====
1. The Twilight Zone (2:07)
  Written-By – M. Manning
2. Forbidden Planet (2:28)
  Written-By – D. Rose
3. The Lost Weekend Theme (2:41)
  Written-By – Miklos Rozsa
4. Invitation (3:04)
  Written-By – B. Kaper
5. You Stepped Out of a Dream (2:16)
  Written By – Gus Kahn-N.H. Brown
6. The Unknown (2:15)
  Written-By – M. Manning

==== side B ====
1. Far Away Places (2:13)
  Written By – J. Whitney-A.C. Kramer
2. Spellbound Concerto (2:16)
  Written-By – Miklos Rozsa
3. The Sorcerer's Apprentice (2:16)
  Arranged By – Marty Manning
  Composed By – Dukas
4. The Moon Is Low (2:25)
  Written By – A. Freed-N.H. Brown
5. Night on Bald Mountain (2:19)
  Arranged By – Marty Manning
  Composed By – Mussorgsky
6. Shangri-La (n/a)
  Written By – R. Maxwell-M. Malneck

=== Syndication ===
Most episodes continue to be broadcast in syndication. After the cancellation of the series, Serling sold his rights to CBS, unaware of what the future would hold in syndication, and the royalties he would have gained.

Episodes are broadcast nationally on the Syfy channel in the United States. They are regularly shown in late-night slots and in marathons aired typically every year on New Year's Eve and Day and the Fourth of July. Syfy broadcasts are often re-cut to feature more commercials during the time slot, in order to meet the 22 or 44-minute maximum episode runtime.

The Twilight Zone airs Sundays at 12:30 am and Monday-Friday at 11 pm on MeTV.

Originally, there were five episodes not included in the syndication package. Three of those, "Sounds and Silences", "Miniature", and "A Short Drink From a Certain Fountain", were involved in copyright infringement lawsuits. The other two, which have never been in syndication, both from season five, are "An Occurrence at Owl Creek Bridge", a French short film, aired twice per agreement with the filmmakers, and "The Encounter", which was pulled after its initial showing, due to the racial overtones. "The Encounter" has since aired on Syfy for the first time in 2016.

=== Home media ===
The Twilight Zone was released on Region 1 DVD for the first time by Image Entertainment. All of the releases feature uncut episodes. The season releases, The Definitive Collection and Blu-rays, include the radio dramas and the "Next Week" promos. Some of the promos on the season DVDs are audio only. The releases include:

- 43 volumes of 3 to 4 episodes each (released December 29, 1998 – June 12, 2001)
- Five 9-disc Collection DVD sets (released December 3, 2002 – February 25, 2003)
- Season sets: The Twilight Zone: The Definitive Collection (released December 28, 2004 – December 26, 2005)
- The Twilight Zone: The Complete Definitive Collection, 28 discs (released October 3, 2006)
- The Twilight Zone: The Complete Series (Episodes Only Collection), 25 discs (released November 19, 2013; reissued November 11, 2016)

Compilations

- Treasures of The Twilight Zone (3-episode compilation released November 24, 1997)
- More Treasures of The Twilight Zone (3-episode compilation released November 24, 1998)
- The Twilight Zone: 40th Anniversary Gift Pack (19-episode compilation released September 21, 1999)
- The Twilight Zone: Fan Favorites (19-episode compilation released October 26, 2010)
- The Twilight Zone: More Fan Favorites (20-episode compilation released May 8, 2012)
- The Twilight Zone: Essential Episodes (17-episode compilation released July 4, 2014; reissued October 11, 2016)

Limited set

- The Twilight Zone: Gold Collection, a 49-disc set of the entire series, released by V3 Media in December 2002 – only 2,500 copies of this set were made.

Blu-ray
Note: all of the Blu-ray releases are Region A.

- The Twilight Zone: Season 1 (released September 14, 2010)
- The Twilight Zone: Season 2 (released November 16, 2010)
- The Twilight Zone: Season 3 (released on February 15, 2011)
- The Twilight Zone: Season 4 (released on May 17, 2011)
- The Twilight Zone: Season 5 (released on August 30, 2011)
- The Twilight Zone: The Complete Series, 24 discs (released on June 5, 2012; reissued December 13, 2016)

The 1958 Desilu Playhouse episode, "The Time Element," considered to be a "first" pilot for The Twilight Zone (see above) is included as a bonus feature on the Blu-ray release (with Season 1), but not on any of the earlier DVD releases.

UK release

Fremantle Media released a box set for each season of The Twilight Zone on both DVD and Blu-ray over 2011 and early 2012. These sets received high praise and won an award from The Guardian for Best Special Features of 2011. These Blu-rays and DVDs are multi-region and can be played around the world.

=== Radio ===
In 2002, the BBC engaged producer Carl Amari to license the rights from the Rod Serling Estate to turn the TV series into a weekly radio drama series for BBC Radio 4 Extra, which was purchased and distributed by CBS Enterprises in the US. The series features Stacy Keach in Rod Serling's role as narrator. Each 40-minute audio drama includes a Hollywood celebrity in the starring role. Some of the stars include Jim Caviezel, Blair Underwood, Jason Alexander, Jane Seymour, Lou Diamond Phillips, Luke Perry, Michael York, Sean Astin, and Ernie Hudson. The episodes air nationally on hundreds of radio stations and Sirius/XM, and are available for download.

=== Online distribution ===
All five seasons of the series are available on Hulu, Amazon Video, and iTunes.

All seasons as aired, including promotional spots recorded by Serling, are available on Paramount+.

=== Live theater ===
In the late 1990s, a theater in Seattle called Theater Schmeater near the Capitol Hill district began staging late-night live episodes of The Twilight Zone on the weekends after their mainstage performances. The rights were obtained from CBS and the shows included an actor performing as Rod Serling. The "commercial breaks" featured promotions for the theater and advertisements for the concession stand.

== Revivals ==
The series has seen three revivals:

- The Twilight Zone (1985 TV series)
- The Twilight Zone (2002 TV series)
- The Twilight Zone (2019 TV series)

== See also ==
- Twilight Zone: The Movie (1983)
- Twilight Zone: Rod Serling's Lost Classics (1994) American made-for-television film
- The Twilight Zone (franchise)
- The Twilight Zone Tower of Terror (theme park rides)
- Science fiction on television
- Rod Serling's Night Gallery

== Sources ==
- DeVoe, Bill. (2008). Trivia from The Twilight Zone. Albany, GA: Bear Manor Media. ISBN 978-1-59393-136-0
- Grams, Martin. (2008). The Twilight Zone: Unlocking the Door to a Television Classic. Churchville, MD: OTR Publishing. ISBN 978-0-9703310-9-0
- Presnell, Don and Marty McGee. (2008). A Critical History of Television's The Twilight Zone, 1959–1964. Jefferson, NC: McFarland. ISBN 978-0-7864-3886-0
- Sander, Gordon F. Serling: The Rise and Twilight of Television's Last Angry Man. New York: Penguin Books, 1992.
- Stanyard, Stewart T. Dimensions Behind The Twilight Zone. ECW Press, 2007.
- Zicree, Marc Scott. The Twilight Zone Companion. Sillman-James Press, 1982 (second edition).
