= List of The Twilight Zone guest stars =

List of actors

The following is a list of guest stars that appeared on the 1959 anthology television series The Twilight Zone.

Rod Serling himself provided the opening and closing commentary for all episodes and appeared on-screen for the first time at the end of the final episode of the first season, with the episodes featuring some of Hollywood's most familiar faces, including:

== A ==
- Philip Abbott ("Long Distance Call" and "The Parallel")
- Casey Adams ("It's a Good Life")
- Dorothy Adams ("Dust")
- Stanley Adams ("Once Upon a Time" and "Mr. Garrity and the Graves")
- Jay Adler ("The Jungle")
- Luther Adler ("The Man in the Bottle")
- Brian Aherne ("The Trouble with Templeton")
- Charles Aidman ("And When the Sky Was Opened" and "Little Girl Lost")
- Claude Akins ("The Monsters Are Due on Maple Street" and "The Little People")
- Jack Albertson ("The Shelter" and "I Dream of Genie")
- Hardie Albright ("To Serve Man")
- Frank Aletter ("The Parallel")
- Denise Alexander ("Third from the Sun")
- Elizabeth Allen ("The After Hours")
- Sheldon Allman ("The Monsters Are Due on Maple Street")
- John Anderson ("A Passage for Trumpet", "The Odyssey of Flight 33", "Of Late I Think of Cliffordville" and "The Old Man in the Cave")
- Dana Andrews ("No Time Like the Past")
- Edward Andrews ("Third from the Sun" and "You Drive")
- Tod Andrews ("The Bewitchin' Pool")
- John Archer ("Will the Real Martian Please Stand Up?")
- R. G. Armstrong ("Nothing in the Dark")
- Phil Arnold ("Mr. Dingle, the Strong")
- John Astin ("A Hundred Yards Over the Rim")
- Malcolm Atterbury ("Mr. Denton on Doomsday" and "No Time Like the Past")
- Barry Atwater ("The Monsters Are Due on Maple Street")
- Jacques Aubuchon ("Valley of the Shadow")
- Eleanor Audley (voice only) ("The Hitch-Hiker")
- Pamela Austin ("Number 12 Looks Just Like You")
- Val Avery ("The Night of the Meek")

== B ==
- Mary Badham ("The Bewitchin' Pool")
- Raymond Bailey ("Escape Clause", "Back There" and "From Agnes—With Love")
- Martin Balsam ("The Sixteen-Millimeter Shrine" and "The New Exhibit")
- Trevor Bardette ("One More Pallbearer")
- Rayford Barnes ("A Quality of Mercy")
- Leslie Barrett ("I Shot an Arrow Into the Air")
- Barbara Barrie ("Miniature")
- Patricia Barry ("The Chaser" and "I Dream of Genie")
- Harry Bartell ("I Shot an Arrow Into the Air")
- Eddie Barth ("The New Exhibit") (credited as Ed Barth)
- Martine Bartlett ("Night Call")
- Anne Barton ("The Monsters Are Due on Maple Street" and "Shadow Play")
- Richard Basehart ("Probe 7, Over and Out")
- Arthur Batanides ("Mr. Denton on Doomsday" and "The Mirror")
- Jeanne Bates ("It's a Good Life")
- Barbara Baxley ("Mute")
- Orson Bean ("Mr. Bevis")
- Billy Beck ("The New Exhibit")
- Terry Becker ("I Am the Night—Color Me Black")
- Henry Beckman ("Valley of the Shadow" and "A Thing About Machines")
- Fred Beir ("Death Ship"
- Leon Belasco ("A Kind of a Stopwatch")
- Russ Bender ("The Fugitive", "On Thursday We Leave for Home", "The Hitch-Hiker")
- William Benedict ("Sounds and Silences")
- Marjorie Bennett ("The Chaser", "Kick the Can", and "No Time Like the Past")
- Oscar Beregi, Jr. ("The Rip Van Winkle Caper", "Deaths-Head Revisited," and "Mute")
- Shelley Berman ("The Mind and the Matter")
- Joseph Bernard (actor) ("The Shelter")
- James Best ("The Grave", "The Last Rites of Jeff Myrtlebank" and "Jess-Belle")
- Clem Bevans ("Hocus-Pocus and Frisby")
- Philippa Bevans ("The Changing of the Guard")
- Theodore Bikel ("Four O'Clock")
- Edward Binns ("I Shot an Arrow Into the Air" and "The Long Morrow")
- Bill Bixby ("The Thirty-Fathom Grave")
- Larry J. Blake ("The Trouble With Templeton")
- Lela Bliss ("Time Enough at Last")
- Joan Blondell ("What's in the Box")
- Larry Blyden ("A Nice Place to Visit" and "Showdown with Rance McGrew")
- Ann Blyth ("Queen of the Nile")
- Lloyd Bochner ("To Serve Man")
- Robert Boon ("Deaths-Head Revisited" and "Mute")
- Randy Boone ("The 7th Is Made Up of Phantoms")
- Billy Booth ("A Stop at Willoughby")
- Willis Bouchey ("The Masks")
- Antoinette Bower ("Probe 7, Over and Out")
- Rudy Bowman ("The Bard") (uncredited)
- Leslie Bradley ("Judgment Night")
- John Brahm ("Probe 7, Over and Out")
- Neville Brand ("The Encounter")
- Robert Bray ("The 7th Is Made Up of Phantoms")
- Patricia Breslin ("Nick of Time" and "No Time Like the Past")
- Morgan Brittany ("Nightmare as a Child" (uncredited), "Valley of the Shadow" [billed as Suzanne Cupito] and "Caesar and Me" [billed as Suzanne Cupito])
- Peter Brocco ("The Four of Us Are Dying" and "Hocus-Pocus and Frisby")
- James Broderick ("On Thursday We Leave for Home")
- Charles Bronson ("Two")
- Walter Brooke ("The Jungle" and "A Short Drink From a Certain Fountain")
- Robert Brubaker ("The Arrival")
- Claudia Bryar ("Mute")
- Edgar Buchanan ("The Last Rites of Jeff Myrtlebank")
- Walter Burke ("The Big Tall Wish")
- Carol Burnett ("Cavender Is Coming")
- Bart Burns ("Valley of the Shadow")
- Michael Burns ("The Shelter")
- Jeffrey Byron ("The Bewitchin' Pool") (as Tim Stafford)

== C ==
- Sebastian Cabot ("A Nice Place to Visit")
- James T. Callahan ("Ninety Years Without Slumbering")
- Antony Carbone ("The Mirror")
- Art Carney ("The Night of the Meek")
- John Carradine ("The Howling Man")
- Jack Carson ("The Whole Truth")
- Jen Carson ("A Most Unusual Camera")
- Veronica Cartwright ("I Sing the Body Electric")
- Mary Carver ("The Incredible World of Horace Ford")
- Seymour Cassel ("The Self-Improvement of Salvadore Ross")
- Phil Chambers ("The New Exhibit")
- George Chandler ("The Whole Truth")
- Linden Chiles ("Four O'Clock")
- Virginia Christine ("Escape Clause")
- Dane Clark ("The Prime Mover")
- Fred Clark ("A Most Unusual Camera")
- Gage Clarke ("One More Pallbearer")
- Pat Close ("The Changing of the Guard")
- James Coburn ("The Old Man in the Cave")
- Steve Cochran ("What You Need")
- Russell Collins ("Kick the Can")
- Paul Comi ("People Are Alike All Over", "The Odyssey of Flight 33" and "The Parallel")
- Forrest Compton ("The Thirty-Fathom Grave")
- Michael Conrad ("Black Leather Jackets")
- John Considine ("The Thirty-Fathom Grave")
- Michael Constantine ("I Am the Night—Color Me Black")
- Richard Conte ("Perchance to Dream")
- Curt Conway ("He's Alive")
- Ben Cooper ("Still Valley")
- Gladys Cooper ("Nothing in the Dark", "Passage on the Lady Anne" and "Night Call")
- Jackie Cooper ("Caesar and Me")
- Jeanne Cooper ("Mr. Denton on Doomsday")
- Henry Corden ("The Gift")
- Margarita Cordova ("A Thing About Machines")
- Robert Cornthwaite ("Showdown with Rance McGrew" and "No Time Like the Past")
- Ted de Corsia ("The Sixteen-Millimeter Shrine" and "The Brain Center at Whipple's")
- Hazel Court ("The Fear")
- Jerome Cowan ("The Sixteen-Millimeter Shrine")
- Wally Cox ("From Agnes—With Love")
- Bob Crane ("Static") (uncredited voice)
- Fred Crane ("The Parallel")
- Nick Cravat ("Nightmare at 20,000 Feet")
- John Craven ("The Old Man in the Cave")
- John Crawford ("A Hundred Yards Over the Rim")
- Gary Crosby ("Come Wander With Me")
- Patricia Crowley ("Printer's Devil")
- Howard Culver ("Shadow Play")
- Robert Cummings ("King Nine Will Not Return")
- Susan Cummings ("To Serve Man")

== D ==
- Irene Dailey ("Mute")
- Maurice Dallimore ("Cavender Is Coming")
- James Daly ("A Stop at Willoughby")
- Lili Darvas ("Long Distance Call")
- Roger Davis ("Spur of the Moment")
- June Dayton ("A Penny for Your Thoughts")
- Richard Deacon ("The Brain Center at Whipple's")
- Edgar Dearing ("Mr. Garrity and the Graves")
- John Dehner ("The Lonely", "The Jungle" and "Mr. Garrity and the Graves")
- Cyril Delevanti ("A Penny for Your Thoughts", "The Silence", "A Piano in the House" and "Passage on the Lady Anne")
- William Demarest ("What's in the Box")
- Terence De Marney ("The Trade-Ins")
- Andy Devine ("Hocus-Pocus and Frisby")
- Laura Devon ("Jess-Belle")
- Richard Devon ("Dead Man's Shoes")
- Jacqueline deWit ("Time Enough at Last")
- Ivan Dixon ("The Big Tall Wish" and "I Am the Night—Color Me Black")
- Molly Dodd ("I Dream of Genie")
- Patricia Donahue ("A Stop at Willoughby")
- Ludwig Donath ("He's Alive")
- James Doohan ("Valley of the Shadow")
- Donna Douglas ("Eye of the Beholder" and "Cavender Is Coming")
- Ken Drake ("A Hundred Yards Over the Rim" and "A Kind of a Stopwatch")
- Don Dubbins ("Elegy")
- Howard Duff ("A World of Difference")
- Douglass Dumbrille ("The Self-Improvement of Salvadore Ross")
- Don Durant ("A Piano in the House")
- Dan Duryea ("Mr. Denton on Doomsday")
- Robert Duvall ("Miniature")

== E ==
- Buddy Ebsen ("The Prime Mover")
- Jack Elam ("Will the Real Martian Please Stand Up?")
- John Eldredge ("Back There")
- Josip Elic ("One More Pallbearer" and "The Obsolete Man" [as Josep Elic])
- Ross Elliot ("Death Ship" and "In Praise of Pip")
- Robert Emhardt ("Static")
- Richard Erdman ("A Kind of a Stopwatch")
- Bill Erwin ("Mr. Denton on Doomsday", Will the Real Martian Please Stand Up?", "Walking Distance", and "Mute")
- Evans Evans ("A Hundred Yards Over the Rim")

== F ==
- Shelley Fabares ("Black Leather Jackets")
- Peter Falk ("The Mirror")
- Franklyn Farnum ("A Most Unusual Camera") (uncredited)
- Herbie Faye ("A Kind of a Stopwatch")
- Frank Ferguson ("Queen of the Nile")
- John Fiedler ("The Night of the Meek" and "Cavender Is Coming")
- Margaret Field ("The New Exhibit" [credited as Maggie Mahoney])
- Paul Fix ("I Am the Night—Color Me Black")
- James Flavin ("A Passage for Trumpet" and "Once Upon a Time")
- Gertrude Flynn ("Will the Real Martian Please Stand Up?")
- Joe Flynn ("Escape Clause")
- June Foray ("Living Doll" and "The Bewitchin' Pool" - both voice only and both uncredited)
- Constance Ford ("Uncle Simon")
- Michael Forest ("Black Leather Jackets")
- Steve Forrest ("The Parallel")
- Donald Foster ("The Jungle")
- Ron Foster ("The 7th Is Made Up of Phantoms")
- Byron Foulger ("Walking Distance")
- Robert Foulk ("The Hunt") (credited as Robert Faulk)
- Michael Fox ("Nightmare as a Child", "Mr. Dingle, the Strong" and "Sounds and Silences")
- Anne Francis ("The After Hours" and "Jess-Belle")
- James Franciscus ("Judgment Night")
- Milton Frome ("The Four of Us Are Dying")
- Alice Frost ("The Sixteen-Millimeter Shrine" and "It's a Good Life")
- Jerry Fujikawa ("A Quality of Mercy" and "To Serve Man" [as J.H. Fujikawa])
- Lance Fuller ("The Last Rites of Jeff Myrtlebank")

== G ==
- Lew Gallo ("The Rip Van Winkle Caper", "On Thursday We Leave for Home" and "The Hitch-Hiker")
- Betty Garde ("The Odyssey of Flight 33" and "The Midnight Sun")
- Beverly Garland ("The Four of Us Are Dying")
- Susie Garrett ("Dead Man's Shoes")
- Kelton Garwood ("Five Characters in Search of an Exit")
- Larry Gates ("The Shelter")
- Paul Genge ("Dust")
- Betty Lou Gerson ("Ring-a-Ding Girl")
- Connie Gilchrist ("In Praise of Pip")
- Jack Ging ("The Whole Truth")
- Everett Glass ("The Silence")
- Ned Glass ("A Passage for Trumpet" and "The Midnight Sun")
- Maxine Cooper ("And When the Sky Was Opened")
- Thomas Gomez ("Escape Clause" and "Dust")
- Don Gordon ("The Four of Us Are Dying" and "The Self-Improvement of Salvadore Ross")
- Susan Gordon ("The Fugitive")
- William D. Gordon ("Nervous Man in a Four Dollar Room" and "Eye of the Beholder")
- Harold Gould ("Probe 7, Over and Out")
- Sandra Gould ("Cavender Is Coming" and "What's in the Box")
- Raymond Greenleaf ("Back There")
- Dabbs Greer ("Hocus-Pocus and Frisby" and "Valley of the Shadow")
- Virginia Gregg ("Jess-Belle" and "The Masks")
- James Gregory ("Where Is Everybody?" and "The Passersby")
- George Grizzard ("The Chaser" and "In His Image")

== H ==
- Joan Hackett ("A Piano in the House")
- Kevin Hagen ("Elegy" and "You Drive")
- Ron Hagerthy ("Dead Man's Shoes")
- Kenneth Haigh ("The Last Flight")
- Bernie Hamilton ("Shadow Play")
- Kim Hamilton ("The Big Tall Wish")
- Murray Hamilton ("One for the Angels")
- Cedric Hardwicke ("Uncle Simon")
- Betty Harford ("Person or Persons Unknown")
- John Harmon ("The Dummy" and "Of Late I Think of Cliffordville")
- Jonathan Harris ("Twenty Two" and "The Silence")
- Susan Harrison ("Five Characters in Search of an Exit")
- Elizabeth Harrower ("I Am the Night—Color Me Black")
- Buddy Hart ("The Changing of the Guard")
- Dee Hartford ("The Bewitchin' Pool")
- Mariette Hartley ("The Long Morrow")
- Paul Hartman ("Back There")
- Bob Hastings ("I Dream of Genie")
- Richard Haydn ("A Thing About Machines")
- Brooke Hayward ("The Masks")
- Dodie Heath ("Long Live Walter Jameson") (credited as Dody Heath)
- Wayne Heffley ("The Odyssey of Flight 33" and "Black Leather Jackets")
- Percy Helton ("Mute" and "Mr. Garrity and the Graves")
- Charles Herbert ("I Sing the Body Electric")
- Irene Hervey ("Black Leather Jackets")
- Douglas Heyes ("The Invaders")
- Bill Hickman ("Ring-a-Ding Girl")
- Joe Higgins ("Person or Persons Unknown")
- Marcel Hillaire ("A Most Unusual Camera" and "The New Exhibit")
- Pat Hingle ("The Incredible World of Horace Ford")
- Earle Hodgins ("Kick the Can")
- Robert J. Hogan ("Spur of the Moment")
- Jonathan Hole ("The Mighty Casey")
- Earl Holliman ("Where Is Everybody?")
- Sterling Holloway ("What's in the Box")
- Stuart Holmes ("The Silence") (uncredited)
- Dennis Hopper ("He's Alive")
- Geoffrey Horne ("The Gift")
- James Houghton ("The Last Rites of Jeff Myrtlebank")
- Jennifer Howard ("Eye of the Beholder")
- Ron Howard ("Walking Distance") (credited as Ronnie Howard)
- Rodolfo Hoyos, Jr. ("The Mirror")
- Clegg Hoyt ("Static" and "The Bard")
- John Hoyt ("The Lateness of the Hour" and "Will the Real Martian Please Stand Up?")
- Billy E. Hughes ("The Incredible World of Horace Ford")
- Robin Hughes ("The Howling Man")
- Arthur Hunnicutt ("The Hunt")
- Marsha Hunt ("Spur of the Moment")
- Josephine Hutchinson ("I Sing the Body Electric")
- Jim Hutton ("And When the Sky Was Opened")
- Wilfrid Hyde-White ("Passage on the Lady Anne")
- Diana Hyland ("Spur of the Moment")

== I ==
- Harold Innocent ("The Obsolete Man")
- Dale Ishimoto ("A Quality of Mercy")

== J ==
- Harry Jackson ("The Four of Us Are Dying")
- Sherry Jackson ("The Last Rites of Jeff Myrtlebank")
- Dean Jagger ("Static")
- Joyce Jameson ("I Dream of Genie")
- Vivi Janiss ("The Fever" and "The Man in the Bottle")
- Ann Jillian ("Mute")
- Arch Johnson ("Static" and "Showdown with Rance McGrew")
- Arte Johnson ("The Whole Truth")
- Russell Johnson ("Execution" and "Back There")
- Henry Jones ("Mr. Bevis")
- Morgan Jones ("Will the Real Martian Please Stand Up?" and "The Parallel")
- Stan Jones ("Cavender Is Coming") (uncredited)

== K ==
- Byron Kane ("From Agnes—With Love") (uncredited)
- Robert Karnes ("The Arrival")
- Buster Keaton ("Once Upon a Time")
- Don Keefer ("It's a Good Life", "From Agnes—With Love", and "Passage on the Lady Anne")
- Noah Keen ("The Arrival" (as Noah Keene) and "The Trade-Ins")
- William Keene ("The Prime Mover" and "The Midnight Sun")
- Robert Keith ("The Masks")
- Cecil Kellaway ("Elegy" and "Passage on the Lady Anne")
- Sally Kellerman ("Miniature") (uncredited)
- Mike Kellin ("The Thirty-Fathom Grave")
- Pert Kelton ("Miniature")
- Ed Kemmer ("Nightmare at 20,000 Feet")
- William Kendis ("Will the Real Martian Please Stand Up?" and "The Fever")
- Madge Kennedy ("On Thursday We Leave for Home")
- George Keymas ("Eye of the Beholder")
- Colin Kenny ("Passage on the Lady Anne") (uncredited)
- Sandy Kenyon ("The Odyssey of Flight 33", "The Shelter" and "Valley of the Shadow")
- Richard Kiel ("To Serve Man")
- Wright King ("Shadow Play" and "Of Late I Think of Cliffordville")
- Lee Kinsolving ("Black Leather Jackets")
- Phyllis Kirk ("A World of His Own")
- Helen Kleeb ("Jess-Belle")
- Jack Klugman ("A Passage for Trumpet", "A Game of Pool", "Death Ship" and "In Praise of Pip")
- Ted Knight ("The Lonely") (uncredited)
- Gail Kobe ("A World of Difference", "In His Image" and "The Self-Improvement of Salvadore Ross")
- Nancy Kulp ("The Fugitive")
- Will Kuluva ("The Mirror" and "The New Exhibit")

== L ==
- Gil Lamb ("Once Upon a Time")
- Paul Lambert (actor) ("King Nine Will Not Return")
- Martin Landau ("Mr. Denton on Doomsday" and "The Jeopardy Room")
- Muriel Landers ("A Piano in the House")
- Charles Lane ("Mr. Bevis")
- Paul Langton ("Where Is Everybody?" and "On Thursday We Leave for Home")
- William Lanteau ("The Bard")
- Robert Lansing ("The Long Morrow")
- John Larch ("Perchance to Dream", "Dust" and "It's a Good Life")
- Mary LaRoche ("A World of His Own" and "Living Doll")
- Wesley Lau ("The Fugitive" and "Twenty Two")
- Frederic Ledebur ("The Howling Man")
- Cloris Leachman ("It's a Good Life")
- Ruta Lee ("A Short Drink From a Certain Fountain")
- George Lindsey ("I Am the Night—Color Me Black")
- Joanne Linville ("The Passersby")
- Josie Lloyd ("The Old Man in the Cave")
- Suzanne Lloyd ("Perchance to Dream")
- Richard Long ("Person or Persons Unknown" and "Number 12 Looks Just Like You")
- Jon Lormer ("Dust", "Execution, "The Last Rites of Jeff Myrtlebank" and "Jess-Belle")
- Donald Losby ("Mr. Dingle, the Strong")
- Phyllis Love ("Four O'Clock")
- Celia Lovsky ("Queen of the Nile")
- Ida Lupino ("The Sixteen-Millimeter Shrine")
- Richard Lupino ("King Nine Will Not Return") (uncredited)
- Allan Lurie ("Escape Clause") (uncredited)
- Jimmy Lydon ("Back There")
- Ken Lynch ("Mr. Denton on Doomsday")
- Gene Lyons ("King Nine Will Not Return")

== M ==
- Moyna Macgill ("Four O'Clock")
- David Macklin ("Ring-a-Ding Girl")
- Patrick Macnee ("Judgment Night")
- George Macready ("The Long Morrow")
- Maggie Mahoney (Margaret Field) ("The New Exhibit")
- Nancy Malone ("Stopover in a Quiet Town")
- Joe Mantell ("Nervous Man in a Four Dollar Room" and "Steel")
- Ralph Manza ("The Dummy")
- Lori March ("Third from the Sun")
- Theodore Marcuse ("To Serve Man" and "The Trade-Ins")
- John Marley ("Kick the Can" and "The Old Man in the Cave")
- Nora Marlowe ("Night Call" and "Back There")
- Joe Maross ("Third from the Sun" and "The Little People")
- Florence Marly ("Dead Man's Shoes")
- Jean Marsh ("The Lonely")
- Joan Marshall ("Dead Man's Shoes")
- Sarah Marshall ("Little Girl Lost")
- Arlene Martel ("Twenty Two) (credited as Arline Sax)
- Dewey Martin ("I Shot an Arrow Into the Air")
- Nan Martin ("The Incredible World of Horace Ford")
- Ross Martin ("The Four of Us Are Dying" and "Death Ship")
- Strother Martin ("The Grave")
- Lee Marvin ("The Grave" and "Steel")
- Ron Masak ("The Purple Testament")
- Murray Matheson ("Five Characters in Search of an Exit")
- Jenny Maxwell ("Long Distance Call")
- Paul Mazursky ("The Purple Testament", "The Gift" and "He's Alive")
- Mitzi McCall ("The Hitch-Hiker") (uncredited)
- Kevin McCarthy ("Long Live Walter Jameson")
- Doug McClure ("Mr. Denton on Doomsday")
- Robert McCord: may have made as many as 67 appearances, many uncredited; IMDb confirmed appearances are: "The Monsters Are Due on Maple Street" (uncredited), "The Odyssey of Flight 33" (uncredited), "Long Distance Call" (uncredited), "A Hundred Yards Over the Rim" (as Robert L. McCord III), "The Mirror" (uncredited), "To Serve Man" (uncredited), "Person or Persons Unknown" (uncredited), "The New Exhibit" (as Robert L. McCord), "What's in the Box" (uncredited), "Mr. Denton on Doomsday" (uncredited), "Escape Clause" (uncredited), "Judgment Night" (uncredited), "A World of Difference" (uncredited), "A Nice Place to Visit" (uncredited), "Showdown with Rance McGrew" (uncredited), "Nick of Time" (uncredited), "No Time Like the Past" (uncredited), "Dead Man's Shoes" (uncredited), "The Silence" (uncredited), "The Rip Van Winkle Caper" (stunt double, uncredited), "Dust" (uncredited), "Mr. Dingle, the Strong" (uncredited), "I Dream of Genie" (uncredited), "You Drive" (uncredited), "Mr. Garrity and the Graves" (uncredited), "A Kind of a Stopwatch" (uncredited), "Caesar and Me" (uncredited), "I Am the Night—Color Me Black" (uncredited), "Cavender Is Coming" (uncredited), "The Mind and the Matter" (uncredited), "Long Live Walter Jameson" (uncredited), and "The Purple Testament" (uncredited)
- Roddy McDowall ("People Are Alike All Over")
- John McGiver ("The Bard" and "Sounds and Silences")
- John McIntire ("The Chaser")
- Emily McLaughlin ("The Jungle")
- John McLiam ("Miniature", "Uncle Simon") (uncredited), "The Midnight Sun" (uncredited), "The Shelter")
- Horace McMahon ("Mr. Bevis")
- Jenna McMahon ("King Nine Will Not Return")
- Maggie McNamara ("Ring-a-Ding Girl")
- Howard McNear ("Hocus-Pocus and Frisby" and "The Bard")
- Eve McVeagh ("Kick the Can" (uncredited) and "I Am the Night—Color Me Black")
- Doro Merande ("The Bard")
- Burgess Meredith ("Time Enough at Last", "Mr. Dingle, the Strong", "The Obsolete Man" and "Printer's Devil")
- Gary Merrill ("Still Valley")
- Burt Metcalfe ("The Monsters Are Due on Maple Street")
- Vera Miles ("Mirror Image")
- Mark Miller ("I Dream of Genie")
- Martin Milner ("Mirror Image")
- Nico Minardos ("The Gift")
- George Mitchell ("Ring-a-Ding Girl, "Jess-Belle", "Execution", "The Hitch-Hiker")
- John Mitchum ("The Rip Van Winkle Caper" and "Mr. Garrity and the Graves")
- Elizabeth Montgomery ("Two")
- Ralph Moody ("The Last Rites of Jeff Myrtlebank")
- Alvy Moore ("Showdown with Rance McGrew") (uncredited)
- Agnes Moorehead ("The Invaders")
- Read Morgan ("What You Need")
- Greg Morris ("The 7th Is Made Up of Phantoms")
- Howard Morris ("I Dream of Genie")
- Jeff Morris ("The 7th Is Made Up of Phantoms")
- Byron Morrow ("People Are Alike All Over")
- Jeff Morrow ("Elegy")
- Barry Morse ("A Piano in the House")
- Billy Mumy ("Long Distance Call", "It's a Good Life" and "In Praise of Pip")
- George Murdock ("The Dummy")
- Kate Murtagh ("Mr. Garrity and the Graves") (uncredited)
- Burt Mustin ("The Night of the Meek" and "Kick the Can")

== N ==
- Alan Napier ("Passage on the Lady Anne")
- Barry Nelson ("Stopover in a Quiet Town")
- Ed Nelson ("Valley of the Shadow")
- Lois Nettleton ("The Midnight Sun")
- Paul Newlan ("The Brain Center at Whipple's")
- Julie Newmar ("Of Late I Think of Cliffordville")
- Alex Nicol ("Young Man's Fancy")
- Barbara Nichols ("Twenty Two")
- Leonard Nimoy ("A Quality of Mercy")
- Stuart Nisbet ("In Praise of Pip") (uncredited)
- Jeanette Nolan ("The Hunt" and "Jess-Belle")
- Maidie Norman ("The Masks") (uncredited)

== O ==
- Tim O'Connor ("On Thursday We Leave for Home")
- Shirley O'Hara "(The Rip Van Winkle Caper" and "On Thursday We Leave for Home")
- J. Pat O'Malley ("The Chaser", "The Fugitive" and "Mr. Garrity and the Graves", "The Self-Improvement of Salvadore Ross")
- Pat O'Malley ("Walking Distance", "Back There" and "Static")
- Anne O'Neal ("Kick the Can")
- Patrick O'Neal ("A Short Drink From a Certain Fountain")
- Simon Oakland ("The Rip Van Winkle Caper" and "The Thirty-Fathom Grave")
- Warren Oates ("The Purple Testament" and "The 7th Is Made Up of Phantoms")
- Philip Ober ("Spur of the Moment")
- Susan Oliver ("People Are Alike All Over")
- Nelson Olmsted ("To Serve Man")
- David Opatoshu ("Valley of the Shadow")
- Cliff Osmond ("The Gift")
- Frank Overton ("Walking Distance" and "Mute")
- Tudor Owen ("No Time Like the Past")

== P ==
- Doris Packer ("I Sing the Body Electric")
- Gloria Pall ("And When the Sky Was Opened") (uncredited)
- Suzy Parker ("Number 12 Looks Just Like You")
- Milton Parsons ("I Dream of Genie" (uncredited), "The New Exhibit", and "Once Upon a Time")
- Michael Pataki ("A Quality of Mercy")
- Hank Patterson ("Kick the Can","Ring-a-Ding Girl" and "Come Wander With Me")
- Alice Pearce ("Static")
- Jack Perkins ("The Last Flight") (uncredited)
- Vic Perrin ("People Are Alike All Over" and "Ring-a-Ding Girl")
- Barbara Pery ("The Chaser")
- Joseph V. Perry ("Nightmare as a Child" (as Joe Perry) and "The Gift" (uncredited))
- Nehemiah Persoff ("Judgment Night")
- House Peters, Jr. ("Mr. Bevis")
- Arthur Peterson ("The Fever")
- George Petrie ("In His Image")
- Lee Philips ("Passage on the Lady Anne" and "Queen of the Nile")
- Barney Phillips ("The Purple Testament", "A Thing About Machines", "Will the Real Martian Please Stand Up? and "Miniature")
- William Phipps ("The Purple Testament")
- John Pickard ("Ninety Years Without Slumbering")
- Phillip Pine ("The Four of Us Are Dying" and "The Incredible World of Horace Ford")
- Edward Platt ("A Hundred Yards Over the Rim")
- Donald Pleasence ("The Changing of the Guard")
- Sydney Pollack ("The Trouble With Templeton")
- Denver Pyle ("Black Leather Jackets")

== R ==
- Jack Raine ("Passage on the Lady Anne", "Spur of the Moment" (uncredited))
- Sue Randall ("And When the Sky Was Opened" and "From Agnes—With Love")
- Thalmus Rasulala (credited as Jack Crowder) ("The Brain Center at Whipple's")
- Guy Raymond ("Of Late I Think of Cliffordville")
- Robert Redford ("Nothing in the Dark")
- Marge Redmond ("The Bard")
- Walter Reed ("Nick of Time")
- Stafford Repp ("Nick of Time", "The Grave" and "Caesar and Me")
- Burt Reynolds ("The Bard")
- William Reynolds ("The Purple Testament")
- Darryl Richard ("The Changing of the Guard")
- Frank Richards (actor) ("Mr. Dingle, the Strong")
- Peter Mark Richman ("The Fear")
- Don Rickles ("Mr. Dingle, the Strong")
- Robby the Robot ("Uncle Simon" (uncredited), "The Brain Center at Whipple's" (uncredited), and "One for the Angels" (as a tinplate battery operated toy) (uncredited))
- Roy Roberts ("A Kind of a Stopwatch")
- Cliff Robertson ("A Hundred Yards Over the Rim" and "The Dummy")
- Bartlett Robinson ("Back There" and "To Serve Man")
- Mickey Rooney ("The Last Night of a Jockey")
- Fay Roope ("Execution)
- Hayden Rorke ("A Penny for Your Thoughts")
- Gene Roth ("Shadow Play")
- Janice Rule ("Nightmare as a Child")
- Joseph Ruskin ("The Man in the Bottle" and "To Serve Man" - voice only - uncredited )
- Bing Russell ("The Arrival" and "Ring-a-Ding Girl")
- Eileen Ryan ("A World of Difference")
- Eddie Ryder ("Mr. Dingle, the Strong")

== S ==
- Albert Salmi ("Execution", "A Quality of Mercy" and "Of Late I Think of Cliffordville")
- Robert Sampson ("Little Girl Lost")
- Hugh Sanders ("Judgment Night", "The Jungle" and "Of Late I Think of Cliffordville")
- Joseph Sargent ("In His Image" (uncredited) and "Twenty Two" (uncredited))
- Telly Savalas ("Living Doll")
- Arline Sax ("What You Need" and "Twenty Two")
- William Schallert ("Mr. Bevis")
- Joseph Schildkraut ("Deaths-Head Revisited" and "The Trade-Ins")
- Jacqueline Scott ("The Parallel")
- Pippa Scott ("The Trouble With Templeton")
- Simon Scott ("The Last Flight")
- Vito Scotti ("Mr. Bevis" and "The Gift")
- Alexander Scourby ("The Last Flight")
- James Seay ("In His Image")
- Charles Seel ("The Hunt")
- Milton Selzer ("Hocus-Pocus and Frisby" and "The Masks")
- Rod Serling ("A World of His Own") (as himself)
- William Shatner ("Nick of Time" and "Nightmare at 20,000 Feet")
- David Sheiner ("The Thirty-Fathom Grave")
- Max Showalter ("It's a Good Life") (credited as Casey Adams)
- Frank Silvera ("Person or Persons Unknown")
- Robert F. Simon ("No Time Like the Past")
- Doris Singleton ("A Kind of a Stopwatch")
- Penny Singleton ("Sounds and Silences")
- Everett Sloane ("The Fever")
- Howard Smith ("A Stop at Willoughby" and "Cavender Is Coming")
- Loring Smith ("The Whole Truth" and "I Dream of Genie")
- Patricia Smith ("Long Distance Call")
- Robert Snyder ("One More Pallbearer") (uncredited)
- Abraham Sofaer ("The Mighty Casey")
- Vladimir Sokoloff ("Dust", "The Mirror" and "The Gift")
- Robert Sorrells ("The Mighty Casey")
- Olan Soule ("The Man in the Bottle" and "Caesar and Me")
- Katherine Squire ("One More Pallbearer" and "In His Image")
- Tim Stafford (see Jeffrey Byron) ("The Bewitchin' Pool")
- Edgar Stehli ("Long Live Walter Jameson")
- Robert Sterling ("Printer's Devil")
- Inger Stevens ("The Hitch-Hiker" and "The Lateness of the Hour")
- Naomi Stevens ("Mirror Image")
- Warren Stevens ("Dead Man's Shoes")
- Peggy Stewart ("The Shelter")
- Dean Stockwell ("A Quality of Mercy")
- George E. Stone ("Once Upon a Time")
- Harold J. Stone ("The Arrival")
- Judy Strangis ("The Bard")
- Amzie Strickland ("The Monsters Are Due on Maple Street")
- Edson Stroll ("Eye of the Beholder" and "The Trade-Ins")
- Leonard Strong ("The Hitch-Hiker")
- Shepperd Strudwick ("Nightmare as a Child")
- Maxine Stuart ("Eye of the Beholder")
- Alan Sues ("The Masks")
- Liam Sullivan ("The Silence" and "The Changing of the Guard")
- Frank Sutton ("The Dummy")
- Éva Szörényi ("Mute")

== T ==
- Ralph Taeger ("From Agnes—With Love")
- George Takei ("The Encounter")
- Stephen Talbot ("Static" and "The Fugitive")
- Charles Tannen ("To Serve Man") (uncredited)
- Dub Taylor ("The Last Rites of Jeff Myrtlebank")
- Ferris Taylor ("Mirror Image")
- Rod Taylor ("And When the Sky Was Opened")
- Vaughn Taylor ("Time Enough at Last", "Still Valley", "I Sing the Body Electric", "The Incredible World of Horace Ford" and "The Self-Improvement of Salvadore Ross")
- Ray Teal ("Printer's Devil")
- Irene Tedrow ("Walking Distance" and "The Lateness of the Hour")
- Phyllis Thaxter ("Young Man's Fancy")
- Charles P. Thompson ("Printer's Devil")
- Dan Tobin ("A Penny for Your Thoughts")
- Franchot Tone ("The Silence")
- Harry Townes ("The Four of Us Are Dying" and "Shadow Play")
- Paul Tripp ("The Fugitive")
- Ernest Truex ("What You Need" and "Kick the Can")
- Natalie Trundy ("Valley of the Shadow")

== V ==
- Lee Van Cleef ("The Grave")
- John Van Dreelen ("The Jeopardy Room")
- Friedrich von Ledebur ("The Howling Man")
- Joyce Van Patten ("Passage on the Lady Anne")
- Kaaren Verne ("Deaths-Head Revisited") (as Karen Verne)
- Ralph Votrian ("A Quality of Mercy")

== W ==
- Garry Walberg ("Where Is Everybody?")
- William Walker ("The Masks") (uncredited)
- John Ward ("On Thursday We Leave for Home")
- Jack Warden ("The Lonely" and "The Mighty Casey")
- Sandra Warner ("A Nice Place to Visit" (uncredited) and "The Dummy")
- Robert Warwick ("The Last Flight")
- Bobs Watson ("No Time Like the Past") (uncredited)
- David Wayne ("Escape Clause")
- Fredd Wayne ("Twenty Two" and "The Arrival")
- Dennis Weaver ("Shadow Play")
- Fritz Weaver ("The Obsolete Man") and ("Third from the Sun")
- Mary Webster ("A Passage for Trumpet" and "Death Ship")
- Lennie Weinrib ("Miniature")
- Rusty Wescoatt ("The Chaser"
- Dick Wessel ("A Kind of a Stopwatch")
- Helen Westcott ("You Drive") (as Hellena Westcott)
- James Westerfield ("Mr. Dingle, the Strong")
- Jack Weston ("The Monsters Are Due on Maple Street" and "The Bard")
- Christine White ("The Prime Mover" and "Nightmare at 20,000 Feet")
- Dan White ("Dust")
- David White ("A World of Difference" and "I Sing the Body Electric" (uncredited))
- Jesse White ("Once Upon a Time" and "Cavender Is Coming")
- Ruth White ("The Incredible World of Horace Ford")
- James Whitmore ("On Thursday We Leave for Home")
- Don Wilbanks ("The Old Man in the Cave") (uncredited)
- Collin Wilcox ("Number 12 Looks Just Like You")
- Guy Wilkerson ("Nick of Time")
- Elen Willard ("The Grave")
- Jean Willes ("Will the Real Martian Please Stand Up?")
- Adam Williams ("The Hitch-Hiker" and "A Most Unusual Camera")
- Edy Williams ("The Dummy")
- John Williams ("The Bard")
- Rhoda Williams ("Little Girl Lost") (voice only) (uncredited)
- Dave Willock ("The Trouble With Templeton")
- Dick Wilson ("Escape Clause" and "Ninety Years Without Slumbering")
- William Windom ("Five Characters in Search of an Exit" and "Miniature")
- Jason Wingreen ("A Stop at Willoughby", "The Midnight Sun" and "The Bard")
- Jonathan Winters ("A Game of Pool")
- Estelle Winwood ("Long Live Walter Jameson")
- Joseph Wiseman ("One More Pallbearer")
- Ian Wolfe ("Uncle Simon")
- Frank Wolff ("A Passage for Trumpet")
- Ward Wood ("I Am the Night—Color Me Black") (uncredited)
- C. Lindsay Workman ("No Time Like the Past")
- Ben Wright ("Judgment Night", "Deaths-Head Revisited" and "Dead Man's Shoes")
- Than Wyenn ("Execution")
- Meg Wyllie ("The Night of the Meek")
- H.M. Wynant ("The Howling Man")
- Ed Wynn ("One for the Angels" and "Ninety Years Without Slumbering")
- Keenan Wynn ("A World of His Own")

== Y ==
- Dick York ("The Purple Testament" and "A Penny for Your Thoughts")
- Carleton Young ("To Serve Man") (as "Carlton Young")
- Gig Young ("Walking Distance")

== Z ==
- John Zaremba ("No Time Like the Past")
