= Probe 7, Over and Out =

- The Twilight Zone episode
- Episode no.: Season 5 Episode 9
- Directed by: Ted Post
- Written by: Rod Serling
- Production code: 2622
- Original air date: November 29, 1963

Guest appearances
- Richard Basehart; Antoinette Bower; Harold Gould; Barton Heyman

Episode chronology
← Previous "Uncle Simon"	Next → "The 7th Is Made Up of Phantoms"
- The Twilight Zone (1959 TV series) (season 5)

"Probe 7, Over and Out" is an episode of the American television anthology series The Twilight Zone.

== Opening narration ==
One Colonel Cook, a traveler in space. He's landed on a remote planet several million miles from his point of departure. He can make an inventory of his plight by just one 360-degree movement of head and eyes. Colonel Cook has been set adrift in an ocean of space in a metal lifeboat that has been scorched and destroyed and will never fly again. He survived the crash but his ordeal is yet to begin. Now he must give battle to loneliness. Now Colonel Cook must meet the unknown. It's a small planet set deep in space, but for Colonel Cook, it's the Twilight Zone.

== Plot ==
Astronaut Colonel Adam Cook crash lands on a strange planet 4.3 light years away from home, with gravity and atmospheric conditions similar to those of his home world. Most of his equipment is destroyed in the crash and cannot be repaired due to a lack of resources and his having broken two bones in his right arm and one rib. He contacts his home base and speaks with a subordinate officer and then with General Larrabee, but they have little encouragement for him — there is no replacement spacecraft to rescue him, and his home planet may be at war in a matter of hours. Larrabee does, however, add that it may be possible to transmit instructions on how to repair the ship.

In a subsequent communication, Larrabee reports that the enemy attacked and "our entire seacoast went" in 12 minutes after which there was retaliation "with alacrity and great effectiveness." Those at base will have to move soon, meaning Cook will have no one to contact.

Cook leaves his ship at night and finds drawn patterns in the dirt. While looking for the source, he is hit by a rock from an unseen source, and knocked unconscious, causing him to not hear Larrabee's last transmission that radiation from the attacks will kill any remaining survivors and ends with the words, "Whoever you meet there, however you meet them, I hope it can come without fear. I hope it can come without anger. I hope your new world will be different. I hope you'll find no word such as hate. I hope there'll be...".

Upon regaining consciousness, Cook returns to his ship and is startled by a noise coming from a closet. Cook leaves the ship as a gesture showing that he means the alien no harm. A human-like female emerges from his ship. Not knowing each other's languages, they communicate through sketches in the sand and pantomime. Adam learns that the alien, whose name is Norda, is also stranded; her planet left its orbit and she is its sole survivor. As they prepare to look for food, Cook picks up a stick, which Norda interprets as a threat. She scratches his face and runs away.

Soon after, Norda returns and expresses remorse for her actions, which Cook happily forgives. They find a more fertile area, which Cook likens to a "garden." He fully introduces himself as "Adam Cook," a man with a broken arm and a broken rib. Norda gives her full name as "Eve Norda". Adam and Eve begin a new life on this planet she calls "Earth". At this point she offers him a "seppla" (an anagram of the word "apples", which are artistically depicted as the biblical forbidden fruit). As they venture further, Rod Serling narrates that he presumes the place they are heading to is Eden.

== Closing narration ==
Do you know these people? Names familiar, are they? They lived a long time ago. Perhaps they're part fable, perhaps they're part fantasy. And perhaps the place they're walking to now is not really called 'Eden.' We offer it only as a presumption. This has been the Twilight Zone.

== Cast ==
- Richard Basehart as Colonel Adam Cook
- Antoinette Bower as Eve Norda
- Harold Gould as General Larrabee
- Barton Heyman as Lieutenant Blane [the dialogue does not indicate name or rank]

== Notes ==
"Probe 7, Over and Out" was intended to air a week after the premiere of "Night Call," which was scheduled for Friday, November 22, 1963 — the previous episode, "Uncle Simon," having aired a week earlier on November 15. Hours before "Night Call" was to air though, President John F. Kennedy was assassinated in Dallas, Texas. Thus it was rescheduled, as were all of the other network shows. As a result, "Probe 7, Over and Out" immediately follows "Uncle Simon" in original broadcast order. "Night Call" was eventually broadcast on February 7, 1964.

In the early 2000s, Twilight Zone historian Marc Scott Zicree recorded a commentary track with director Ted Post discussing this episode. The commentary appears as part of the 2016 Blu-ray edition.

The radio adaptation of this episode starred Louis Gossett Jr.
