= Ring-a-Ding Girl =

- The Twilight Zone episode
- Episode no.: Season 5 Episode 13
- Directed by: Alan Crosland, Jr.
- Written by: Earl Hamner, Jr.
- Production code: 2623
- Original air date: December 27, 1963

Guest appearances
- Maggie McNamara; Mary Munday; David Macklin; Betty Lou Gerson; Vic Perrin; George Mitchell; Bing Russell; Hank Patterson

Episode chronology
← Previous "Ninety Years Without Slumbering"	Next → "You Drive"
- The Twilight Zone (1959 TV series) (season 5)

"Ring-a-Ding Girl" is episode 133 of the American television anthology series The Twilight Zone. It originally aired on December 27, 1963 on CBS. In this episode, a movie star (played by Maggie McNamara) receives a mystical summons to return to her hometown in a matter of life and death.

== Opening narration ==
Introduction to Bunny Blake. Occupation: film actress. Residence: Hollywood, California, or anywhere in the world that cameras happen to be grinding. Bunny Blake is a public figure; what she wears, eats, thinks, says is news. But underneath the glamour, the makeup, the publicity, the buildup, the costuming, is a flesh-and-blood person, a beautiful girl about to take a long and bizarre journey into The Twilight Zone.

== Plot ==
In her house in Hollywood, California, actress Barbara "Bunny" Blake receives a ring from her hometown fan club in Howardsville, Virginia, and she tells her manager that her loyalty is still to her town because they all paid to help her go to Hollywood to pursue her acting career. Looking into the stone of the ring, she sees her sister Hildy imploring Bunny to come home. Though she is due to film a movie in Rome, Bunny makes an impromptu trip to Howardsville to surprise Hildy and her family.

Hildy and her son Bud hope that Bunny will attend the annual founder's day picnic, which coincidentally happens to be that very afternoon. Upon hearing this and after seeing a vision of local television newsreader Ben Braden also asking her to "come home", Bunny suffers a seizure, and Hildy calls over an old friend, the town doctor, who diagnoses Bunny with exhaustion from her hectic career and orders her to rest, over her protests. As he is also the chairman/organizer for the annual founder's day picnic, Bunny requests that he postpone the entire event so that she can see her friends in more personal settings, but he refuses and surmises that she has been spoiled by her Hollywood lifestyle.

As she sees a vision of her high school's custodian, Cyrus Gentry, requesting her help for the town, Bunny flees to the bathroom. The doctor gives Bunny's prescription slip to Hildy, but Bunny insists on accompanying Bud to the drugstore. On the way, they stop by her old school to meet Gentry, whom she asks to leave the school gates open. She then goes to the local TV station for an impromptu interview with Braden. In the interview, she announces a one-woman show in the high school gymnasium for the same time as the picnic. When Braden points out the conflict, she flippantly says the people will enjoy her show more.

Hildy accuses Bunny of "showing off" by forcing the town to choose between seeing her or attending the picnic. Bunny insists that she loves the town and its people and that she is using her show as a way of thanking them. Hildy at first intends to go to the picnic with Bud. When Bunny sees a vision in her ring of a jetliner and its passengers, including herself and her manager, Hildy reconsiders and agrees to attend Bunny's show. As they are about to leave, it begins to rain. As they hear sirens outside, Bunny envisions herself on the jetliner in the rain, and she hugs her slightly bewildered sister. A breaking news flash comes on over the radio, and while Hildy and Bud are listening to the first reports of an airplane crash, Bunny quietly says goodbye, goes outside in the rain and vanishes.

A police officer calls to inform Hildy that Bunny was killed in the plane crash. The radio news anchor notes conflicting reports from onlookers who said that Bunny was on the plane and several townspeople who had seen her in town that day. The anchorman notes that many of the townspeople were in the auditorium waiting to see Bunny's show and that they would have died had they gone to the picnic because the jetliner crashed on the grounds. Hildy finds Bunny's ring, which had fallen to the floor and is now chipped and charred, and she realizes that Bunny had predicted her impending death in the plane crash and had come in spirit via the ring to save her friends and family.

== Closing narration ==
We are all travelers. The trip starts in a place called birth, and ends in that lonely town called death. And that's the end of the journey, unless you happen to exist for a few hours, like Bunny Blake, in the misty regions of the Twilight Zone.

== Cast ==
- Maggie McNamara as Barbara "Bunny" Blake
- Mary Munday as Hildy Powell
- David Macklin as Bud Powell
- Betty Lou Gerson as Cici
- Vic Perrin as State Trooper (Jim)
- George Mitchell as Dr. Floyd
- Bing Russell as Ben Braden
- Hank Patterson as Mr. Gentry
- Bill Hickman as Pilot
