= The Trade-Ins =

- The Twilight Zone episode
- Episode no.: Season 3 Episode 31
- Directed by: Elliot Silverstein
- Written by: Rod Serling
- Production code: 4831
- Original air date: April 20, 1962

Guest appearances
- Joseph Schildkraut: John Holt; Noah Keen: Mr. Vance; Alma Platt: Marie Holt; Ted Marcuse: Farraday; Edson Stroll: Young John Holt; Terence De Marney: Gambler #1; Billy Vincent: Gambler #2; Mary McMahon: Receptionist; David Armstrong: Surgeon

Episode chronology
← Previous "Hocus-Pocus and Frisby"	Next → "The Gift"
- The Twilight Zone (1959 TV series) (season 3)

"The Trade-Ins" is episode 96 of the American television anthology series The Twilight Zone.

== Opening narration ==
Mr. and Mrs. John Holt, aging people who slowly and with trembling fingers turn the last pages of a book of life and hope against logic and the preordained that some magic printing press will add to this book another limited edition. But these two senior citizens happen to live in a time of the future where nothing is impossible, even the trading of old bodies for new. Mr. and Mrs. John Holt, in their twilight years, who are about to find that there happens to be a zone with the same name.

== Plot ==
An elderly couple, John and Marie Holt, visit a medical center specializing in a new technology: trading aged bodies in for younger models. The center representative, Mr. Vance, tells them that 98% of couples have been happy with the quality of the swap, but the company offers a guarantee that if they change their mind afterwards within one week, the procedure can be reversed. The swap costs $5,000 per body; since the Holts only have $5,000 in total, and government regulations prohibit the extension of credit for the procedure, only one of them can afford to swap. Due to John's ailing health, Marie suggests that he go first, but he refuses unless they can both undergo the procedure.

John attempts to earn the rest of the money in a high-stakes poker game, but loses most of his $5,000 over several hands. His remaining competitor, Faraday, asks why he is taking such a risk. After John explains his situation, a sympathetic Faraday allows him to leave with his $5,000 despite having the winning hand. John admits to Faraday that he cannot endure his physical pain any longer and is going to have the procedure.

After John is transferred to a new body and tells Marie how wonderful their new life will be, Marie breaks down in tears, unable to relate to a husband so much younger than she. John opts for the return clause, willing to cope with his pain so they can be together. Once his original body is restored, the Holts depart towards an uncertain future, their love for each other "younger" than ever.

== Closing narration ==
From Kahlil Gibran's The Prophet: "Love gives not but itself and takes not from itself, love possesses not nor would it be possessed, for love is sufficient unto love." Not a lesson, just a reminder, from all the sentimentalists in the Twilight Zone.
