= The Mirror (The Twilight Zone) =

- The Twilight Zone episode
- Episode no.: Season 3 Episode 6
- Directed by: Don Medford
- Written by: Rod Serling
- Production code: 4819
- Original air date: October 20, 1961

Guest appearances
- Peter Falk as Ramos Clemente; Will Kuluva as General de Cruz; Richard Karlan as D'Alessandro; Vladimir Sokoloff as Father Tomas; Antony Carbone as Cristo; Rodolfo Hoyos Jr. as Garcia; Arthur Batanides as Tabal

Episode chronology
← Previous "A Game of Pool"	Next → "The Grave"
- The Twilight Zone (1959 TV series) (season 3)

"The Mirror" is episode 71 of the American television anthology series The Twilight Zone, and the sixth episode of the third season. It originally aired on October 20, 1961 on CBS. The episode was written by Rod Serling, who described it as "the story of a tyrant and his assassins, a shattered dream and the death of a cause."

== Opening narration ==
This is the face of Ramos Clemente, a year ago a beardless, nameless worker of the dirt who plodded behind a mule, furrowing someone else's land. And he looked up at a hot Central American sun and he pledged the impossible. He made a vow that he would lead an avenging army against the tyranny that put the ache in his back and the anguish in his eyes, and now one year later the dream of the impossible has become a fact. In just a moment we will look deep into this mirror and see the aftermath of a rebellion in the Twilight Zone.

== Plot ==
In a Central American dictatorship, Ramos Clemente and his four lifelong confidants, Cristo, D'Alessandro, Tabal, and Garcia, stage a successful revolution against the regime of General De Cruz. Clemente faces down De Cruz and revels in his victory, but the deposed general says that Clemente will soon learn the consequences of ruling by force and that his ornate mirror has the ability to reveal enemies in its reflection, though Clemente dismisses the latter.

When Clemente begins using the same repressive tactics used by De Cruz, a rift develops between him and his friends, now government heads. When Clemente looks into the mirror, he sees visions implying that all four of his confidantes are plotting to assassinate him. Clemente believes that the mirror reflects their true thoughts and accuses them of their supposed future crimes. A particular point of contention is Clemente's order for mass executions of prisoners he has declared to be enemies of the state. When one confidant reproaches Clemente, Clemente throws him off a balcony to his death; later, Clemente orders two confidantes to start the executions and then secretly orders his guards to kill them as well. He shoots the last confidant himself.

Sometime later, Clemente is approached by a priest named Father Tomas, who asks him to end the executions which have been going on for a week. Clemente refuses, saying that as long as he has enemies, the executions will continue. Eventually however, Clemente seeks counsel from the priest, but finds no comfort in the priest's response that all tyrants have but one real enemy, whom they never recognize until it is too late. Clemente takes one more look in the mirror and sees only himself. He picks up his pistol and throws it at the mirror, smashing the glass. The priest, standing outside Clemente's office, hears the breaking glass and then a gunshot. He rushes into Clemente's office and finds Clemente's lifeless body sprawled on the floor, killed by his own gun when it hit the floor and discharged. "The last assassin," he says, "and they never learn. They never seem to learn."

== Closing narration ==
Ramos Clemente, a would-be god in dungarees, strangled by an illusion, that will-o'-the-wisp mirage that dangles from the sky in front of the eyes of all ambitious men, all tyrants—and any resemblance to tyrants living or dead is hardly coincidental, whether it be here or in the Twilight Zone.

Rod Serling then appears on camera to promote the next episode:

It's traditional in the great American Western the climax of any given story is the gundown on a main street. Next week, Montgomery Pittman's written a story in which we have our gundown and then go on from there. It's a haunting little item about a top gun as he was alive, and his operation after death. This is one for rainy nights and power failures. But wherever you watch it, I think it will leave its imprint.

== Cast ==
- Peter Falk as Ramos Clemente
- Will Kuluva as General De Cruz
- Richard Karlan as D'Alessandro
- Vladimir Sokoloff as Father Tomas
- Antony Carbone as Cristo
- Rodolfo Hoyos Jr. (credited as Rodolfo Hoyos) as Garcia
- Arthur Batanides as Tabal
