= What's in the Box =

- The Twilight Zone episode
- Episode no.: Season 5 Episode 24
- Directed by: Richard L. Bare
- Written by: Martin Goldsmith
- Production code: 2635
- Original air date: March 13, 1964

Guest appearances
- William Demarest as Joe Britt; Joan Blondell as Phyllis Britt; Sterling Holloway as TV Repairman; Herbert Lytton as Dr. Saltman; Sandra Gould as Woman on TV; Howard Wright as Judge

Episode chronology
← Previous "Queen of the Nile"	Next → "The Masks"
- The Twilight Zone (1959 TV series) (season 5)

"What's in the Box" is episode 144 of the American television anthology series The Twilight Zone. It originally aired on March 13, 1964 on CBS. In this episode, a man's television set displays his past, present, and future, revealing to him that he will kill his wife.

== Opening narration ==
Portrait of a TV fan. Name: Joe Britt. Occupation: cab driver. Tonight, Mr. Britt is going to watch "a really big show," something special for the cabbie who's seen everything. Joe Britt doesn't know it, but his flag is down and his meter's running and he's in high gear - on his way to the Twilight Zone.

== Plot ==
Joe and Phyllis Britt are an old married couple in New York City who do not get along. Joe gets home from his job as a cab driver late one night, and Phyllis accuses him of seeing another woman. In the meantime, a television repairman is in the next room fixing their broken set. Irritated, Joe harasses the repairman about the inconvenience and cost. The repairman abruptly closes the open TV panel and announces that the TV is fixed. After stating that the job is free, he leaves; the TV then starts getting channel 10 - a station showing the past, present, and future of Joe and Phyllis' lives. Joe is left stunned when he sees himself along with his mistress. Joe refuses to let Phyllis watch the TV, and faints when he sees himself and Phyllis from the kitchen as before.

When he tunes in again later, the TV shows him killing Phyllis in a fight. Joe breaks down at the sight and tells Phyllis what is happening. Phyllis seeks help from the family doctor, who gives Joe a sedative and says that seeing oneself on television is one of several common delusions manifested by the struggle to adjust to the new technology of television.

Profoundly disturbed by the sight of Phyllis' death, Joe tries to heal their relationship, telling her that he accepts the blame for their feuding and has realized that his extramarital affairs were only an escape from the stress of his job, that Phyllis is still the one he really loves. Embittered by years of Joe's coldness and philandering, Phyllis scorns his attempt at reconciliation. When he begins reacting to another channel 10 vision – his trial for Phyllis's murder and execution via electric chair – even as Phyllis sees only static, Phyllis is convinced that Joe has lost his mind and taunts him. Joe, angered, attacks and kills her just as he had seen on the television screen.

As Joe is arrested by the police, the TV repairman suddenly appears and mockingly asks, "Fix your set okay, mister? You will recommend my service, won't you?" The repairman smirks as Joe is taken away.

== Closing narration ==
The next time your TV set is on the blink, when you're in the need of a first-rate repairman, may we suggest our own specialist? Factory-trained, prompt, honest, twenty-four hour service. You won't find him in the phone book, but his office is conveniently located - in the Twilight Zone.

== Cast ==
- Joan Blondell as Phyllis Britt
- William Demarest as Joe Britt
- Sterling Holloway as TV Repairman
- Herbert Lytton as Dr. Saltman
- Sandra Gould as Woman On T.V.
- Howard Wright as Judge
- Douglas Bank as Prosecutor
- Ted Christy as The Wild Panther
- Robert McCord as Electric Chair Guard
- Tony Miller as Announcer
- Mitchell Rhein as Neighbour
- Rod Serling as Host / Narrator – Himself
- Ron Stokes as Car Salesman
- John L. Sullivan as The Russian Duke
