= Hocus-Pocus and Frisby =

- The Twilight Zone episode
- Frisby's Alien
- Episode no.: Season 3 Episode 30
- Directed by: Lamont Johnson
- Story by: Frederic Louis Fox
- Teleplay by: Rod Serling
- Production code: 4833
- Original air date: April 13, 1962

Guest appearances
- Andy Devine: Frisby; Milton Selzer: Alien #1; Larry Breitman: Alien #2; Peter Brocco: Alien #3; Howard McNear: Mitchell; Dabbs Greer: Scanlan; Clem Bevans: Old Man (Pete)

Episode chronology
← Previous "Four O'Clock"	Next → "The Trade-Ins"
- The Twilight Zone (1959 TV series) (season 3)

"Hocus-Pocus and Frisby" is episode 95 (season 3, number 30) of the American television anthology series The Twilight Zone.

== Opening narration ==
The reluctant gentleman with the sizable mouth is Mr. Frisby. He has all the drive of a broken camshaft and the aggressive vinegar of a corpse. As you've no doubt gathered, his big stock in trade is the tall tale. Now, what he doesn't know is that the visitors out front are a very special breed, destined to change his life beyond anything even his fertile imagination could manufacture. The place is Pitchville Flats, the time is the present. But Mr. Frisby's on the first leg of a rather fanciful journey into the place we call the Twilight Zone.

== Plot ==
Somerset Frisby has a general store/gas station in a small town, and the townsfolk know him for the tall tales he spins of his experiences. These include his heroism in war, his inventions, and his advice to presidents and captains of industry, all of which he fabricates. His friends gather in the store to hear him spin his stories, which they find very entertaining, and he often accompanies himself on harmonica.

One day, two identically dressed men pull up to a store in need of fuel for their car. Noticing their odd behavior and unfamiliarity with the vehicle, Frisby boasts that he designed the American automobile and can predict the weather 24 hours in advance. The men depart, impressed by his claimed achievements and background, stating that they will see him again very soon. That afternoon, as Frisby is closing up his store for the day, one man's voice suggests that he will have "quite an adventure" if he steps outside and walks down the road. As soon as Frisby leaves his store, he is transported onto a vessel crewed by the two visitors and several others dressed like them.

The men, who are actually aliens, have selected Frisby as an outstanding member of the human race and plan to take him back to their home planet to exhibit him alongside specimens from other planets. Frisby protests that he has fabricated all his exploits and is a consummate liar, but he discovers that the aliens have accepted all his tales as true since they have no concept of dishonesty. He punches one alien, causing its human disguise to break apart and reveal its true face.

Unable to overpower the aliens or persuade them to release him, Frisby decides to relax by playing his harmonica. The sound causes unbearable pain to the aliens, rendering some of them unconscious, while the others allow Frisby to escape. Running back to the store, he finds his friends waiting to throw him a surprise party; in the evening's excitement, he has forgotten that it is his birthday. When he tries to tell them what happened, they enjoy a laugh at what they perceive to be another of his tall tales and present him with a "World's Greatest Liar" trophy.

=== Nicknames ===
Mr. Frisby often mentions nicknames that he supposedly has received, which pertain to his tall tales. These nicknames include (ordered as mentioned):

- "Ol' Infilatin' Frisby"
- "Old Cumulus Frisby"
- "Ol' Archimedes Frisby"
- "Rear-Engine" and "Ol' Rear-Engine Frisby"
- "Stonewall Frisby" and "Stony"
- "Ol' Rocket Thrust Frisby"
- "Old Liquid Propellant Frisby"
- "Ol' Mile-A-Minute Frisby"

For his 63rd birthday, Mr. Frisby received a trophy from his friends, declaring him to be the "World's Greatest Liar". Andy Devine himself would have been 57.

== Closing narration ==
Mr. Somerset Frisby, who might have profited by reading an Aesop fable about a boy who cried wolf. Tonight's tall tale from the timberlands of the Twilight Zone.
