= Mirror Image (The Twilight Zone) =

- The Twilight Zone episode
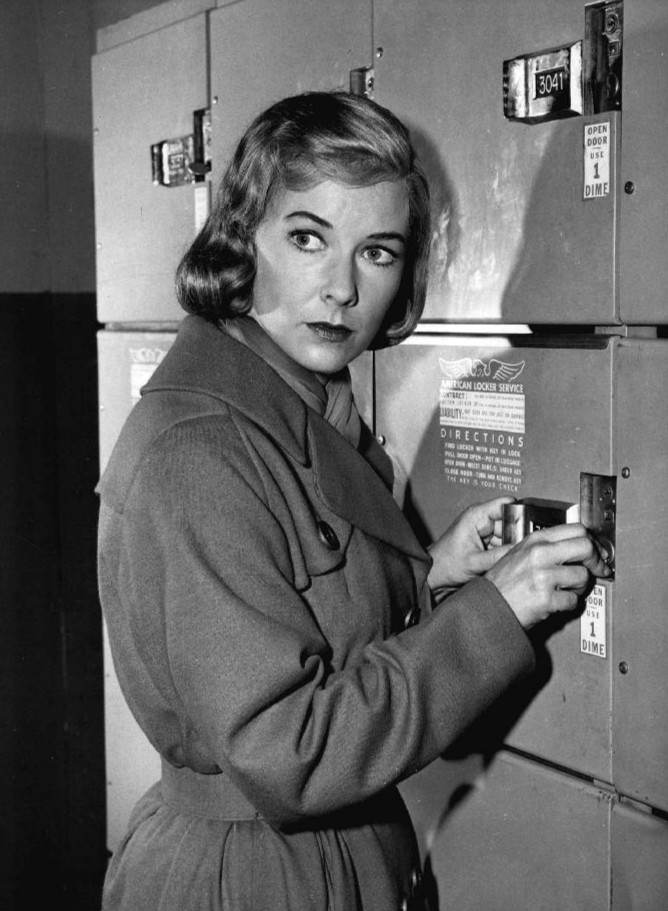
- Vera Miles as Millicent Barnes
- Episode no.: Season 1 Episode 21
- Directed by: John Brahm
- Written by: Rod Serling
- Production code: 173-3623
- Original air date: February 26, 1960

Guest appearances
- Vera Miles as Millicent Barnes; Martin Milner as Paul Grinstead; Joe Hamilton as Ticket agent; Naomi Stevens as Washroom attendant

Episode chronology
← Previous "Elegy"	Next → "The Monsters Are Due on Maple Street"
- The Twilight Zone (1959 TV series, season 1)

"Mirror Image" is the twenty-first episode of the American television anthology series The Twilight Zone. It originally aired on February 26, 1960, on CBS.

== Opening narration ==
Millicent Barnes, age twenty-five, young woman waiting for a bus on a rainy November night. Not a very imaginative type is Miss Barnes: not given to undue anxiety, or fears, or for that matter even the most temporal flights of fancy. Like most young career women, she has a generic classification as a, quote, girl with a head on her shoulders, end of quote. All of which is mentioned now because, in just a moment, the head on Miss Barnes' shoulders will be put to a test. Circumstances will assault her sense of reality and a chain of nightmares will put her sanity on a block. Millicent Barnes, who, in one minute, will wonder if she's going mad.

== Plot ==
Millicent Barnes waits in an isolated bus depot in upstate New York for a bus to Cortland, en route to a new job. Looking at a wall clock she notices the bus is late. She asks the ticket agent when the bus will arrive, and he gruffly complains that this is her third time asking. Millicent denies this. While speaking with him, she notices a bag just like hers on the floor behind the desk. She mentions this and the agent responds that it is her bag. She does not believe this until she notices her bag is not beside the bench anymore. She washes her hands in the restroom and the cleaning lady there insists this is her second time there. Again, Millicent denies this. Upon leaving the restroom, she glances in the mirror and sees, in addition to her reflection, an exact copy of herself sitting on the bench outside.

Millicent then meets a genial young man from Binghamton named Paul Grinstead, who is waiting for the same bus. Paul encourages Millicent to tell him what obviously is bothering her, so she explains about encountering her double. Attempting to calm her, Paul says it is either a joke or a misunderstanding caused by a lookalike. When the bus arrives and the two of them prepare to board, Millicent happens to look up at the windows and sees the copy of herself, already seated on the bus with a malevolent look on her face. In shock, Millicent runs back into the depot and faints.

Millicent lies unconscious on a bench inside the depot while Paul and the cleaning lady attend to her. Paul decides to wait for the 7:00 a.m. bus. While they wait, Millicent, now coming to, insists the strange events are caused by an evil double from a parallel world – a nearby, yet distant alternative plane of existence that comes into convergence with this world as a result of powerful forces, or unnatural, unknown events. When these events occur, the impostors enter this realm. Millicent's doppelgänger can survive in this world only by eliminating and replacing her. Paul says the explanation is "a little metaphysical" for him, and believes that Millicent's sanity is beginning to unravel. Paul tells Millicent he will call a friend in Tully who has a car and may be able to drive them to Syracuse. Instead, he calls the police.

After Millicent is taken away by the police, Paul settles down. After drinking from a water fountain, Paul notices that his valise is now missing. Looking up toward the doors, Paul notices another man running out the door of the bus depot. Pursuing this individual down the street, Paul discovers that he is chasing his own copy, whose face shows a malevolent delight. His copy disappears as Paul calls out, "Where are you?" while looking around in confusion and shock.

== Closing narration ==
Obscure and metaphysical explanation to cover a phenomenon. Reasons dredged out of the shadows to explain away that which cannot be explained. Call it 'parallel planes' or just 'insanity'. Whatever it is, you'll find it in the Twilight Zone.

== Episode notes ==
In a short film pitching the Twilight Zone series to a Dutch television station, creator Rod Serling claimed to have gotten the idea for "Mirror Image" following an encounter at an airport. Serling noticed a man at the other side of the terminal who wore the same clothes and carried the same suitcase as himself; Serling considered what would happen if the man turned around and was revealed to be a duplicate of himself. However, the man turned out to be younger and "more attractive". This episode is one of several episodes from season one with its opening title sequence plastered over with the opening for season two. This was done during the summer of 1961 to help the season one shows blend in with the new look the show would take during the following season.

This episode inspired Jordan Peele's 2019 film Us.
