= The Long Morrow =

- The Twilight Zone episode
- Episode no.: Season 5 Episode 15
- Directed by: Robert Florey
- Written by: Rod Serling
- Production code: 2624
- Original air date: January 10, 1964

Guest appearances
- Robert Lansing; Mariette Hartley; George Macready; Edward Binns; William Swan; Don Spruance

Episode chronology
← Previous "You Drive"	Next → "The Self-Improvement of Salvadore Ross"
- The Twilight Zone (1959 TV series) (season 5)

"The Long Morrow" is episode 135 of the American television anthology series The Twilight Zone. It originally aired on January 10, 1964, on CBS. In this episode, an astronaut falls in love on the eve of a 40-year-long space voyage. The story focuses on how he and his lover confront the problem that his 40 years in suspended animation will cause a wide age disparity between them by the time he returns.

== Opening narration ==
Serling's narration begins with the opening scene of Stansfield in suspended animation:

It may be said with a degree of assurance that not everything that meets the eye is as it appears. Case in point, the scene you're watching. This is not a hospital, not a morgue, not a mausoleum, not an undertaker's parlor of the future. What it is is the belly of a spaceship. It is en route to another planetary system, an incredible distance from the Earth. This is the crux of our story - a flight into space. It is also the story of the things that might happen to human beings who take a step beyond, unable to anticipate everything that might await them out there.

The narration continues after Stansfield is informed that his journey into space will take forty years:

Commander Douglas Stansfield, astronaut, a man about to embark on one of history's longest journeys: forty years out into endless space and hopefully back again. This is the beginning, the first step towards man's longest leap into the unknown. Science has solved the mechanical details and now it's up to one human being to breathe life into blueprints and computers, to prove once and for all that man can live half a lifetime in the total void of outer space, forty years alone in the unknown. This is Earth. Ahead lies a planetary system. The vast region in between is the Twilight Zone.

== Plot ==
Commander Douglas Stansfield, age 31, an astronaut in the year 1987, is scheduled in six months to be sent on an exploratory mission to a planetary system roughly 141 light-years from Earth. Although the spacecraft will travel at the rate of 7 times the speed of light, the round trip will still take forty years. To save him the ordeal of 40 years of loneliness, he is to be placed in (newly developed) suspended animation for the twenty-year trip to his goal, and again for the twenty-year return trip. During his time in suspended animation, he will age only a few weeks.

Shortly before his mission, he meets and is enchanted by his young colleague, Sandra Horn. They meet that night, after only three and half hours, they declare their love for each other, and lament the fact that when Stansfield returns, Sandra will be an old woman.

Forty years later, Stansfield returns to Earth, a forgotten pioneer. The discoveries he made on his mission were independently achieved earlier by technology developed after his departure. Sandra is waiting for him, still 26 and lovely. She had herself put in suspended animation during Stansfield's mission. Stansfield, however, had voluntarily disabled his suspended-animation system six months into his journey after a communications failure on his ship, and is now a man of 70. He has endured forty years of inconceivable loneliness in the hope of being with Sandra when he returned. Sandra offers to continue their relationship, but the heartbroken Stansfield urges Sandra to begin a new life without him.

After Sandra leaves, General Walters offers some small consolation to the aged astronaut: "Stansfield, you're really quite an incredible man. It may be the one distinction of my entire life, that I knew you ... that I knew a man who put such a premium on love. Truly, truly quite a distinction, Stansfield."

== Closing narration ==
Commander Douglas Stansfield, one of the forgotten pioneers of the space age. He's been pushed aside by the flow of progress and the passage of years, and the ferocious travesty of fate. Tonight's tale of the ionosphere and irony, delivered from the Twilight Zone.

== Cast ==
- Robert Lansing as Commander Douglas Stansfield
- Mariette Hartley as Sandra Horn
  - Actress Mariette Hartley was a teenager when she first met Serling. “I was head of the drama club at Staples High School in Westport, Connecticut,” recalled Hartley. “Around the mid-1950s, I saw the ‘Playhouse 90’ episode ‘Requiem for a Heavyweight,’ written by a man called Rod Serling. I was very courageous and gutsy in those days and called him to see if he would speak to our class. He actually answered the phone and said, ‘I’d be delighted.’ I can still see him sitting in the teacher's desk, with his pipe, at the front of the classroom talking to us. He was so handsome I thought my heart would jump out of my skin! We asked questions and I remember his charm and capacity to include all of us in the discussion.” Years later, after she began working in Hollywood, Hartley met Serling again. “His limousine pulled up as I was walking out the studio,” she said. “He remembered coming to my class. I told him I was looking for work and within a couple of months he gave me the wonderful gift of working in ‘The Long Morrow’ episode.’
- George Macready as Dr. Bixler
- Ed Binns as General Walters
- William Swan as Technician
- Don Spruance

== Legacy ==
"The Long Morrow" is the title of a Season 7 episode of Gilmore Girls, where Logan gives Rory a gift inspired by his favorite The Twilight Zone episode, "The Long Morrow".
