= Sounds and Silences =

- The Twilight Zone episode
- Episode no.: Season 5 Episode 27
- Directed by: Richard Donner
- Written by: Rod Serling
- Production code: 2631
- Original air date: April 3, 1964

Guest appearances
- John McGiver - Roswell G. Flemington; Penny Singleton - Mrs. Lydia Flemington; Billy Benedict - Conklin; Francis De Sales - Doctor; Michael Fox - Psychiatrist; Renee Aubry - Ms. Abernathy (Secretary); Lurene Tuttle - Secretary

Episode chronology
| ← Previous "I Am the Night—Color Me Black" | Next → "Caesar and Me" |
- The Twilight Zone (1959 TV series) (season 5)

"Sounds and Silences" is episode 147 of the American television anthology series The Twilight Zone. It originally aired on April 3, 1964 on CBS.

== Opening narration ==
This is Roswell G. Flemington, two hundred and twenty pounds of gristle, lung tissue and sound decibels. He is, as you have perceived, a noisy man, one of a breed who substitutes volume for substance, sound for significance, and shouting to cover up the readily apparent phenomenon that he is nothing more than an overweight and aging perennial Sea Scout whose noise-making is in inverse ratio to his competence and to his character. But soon our would-be admiral of the fleet will embark on another voyage. This one is an unchartered and twisting stream that heads for a distant port called the Twilight Zone.

== Plot ==
Roswell G. Flemington, owner of a model ship company and a former serviceman of the United States Navy, grew up in a home where his mother required silence. Thus, as an adult, he makes as much noise as he possibly can, is obsessed with the Navy, and behaves thunderously in response to any slight.

After twenty years, his wife Lydia becomes fed up with his obsession with noise and walks out on him. Alone, he begins to hear every little noise like an explosion or gunshot. He sees a psychiatrist, who helps him understand that conflict with Lydia has caused him to relive his resentment against his mother to the point that he internalizes his mother's affliction. He now realizes it is all in his head and all he needs to do is overcome the mental block with "mind over matter". He successfully does so, but when Lydia returns to pick up her jewelry, he "shut[s] her out", leading to him going deaf. Desperate to hear anything, he puts on a record and sets the volume to its highest setting. The scene remains silent, but his apartment vibrates from the stereo's sound. Panicked, he opens his windows and begs for noise.

== Closing narration ==
When last heard from, Mr. Roswell G. Flemington was in a sanitarium pleading with the medical staff to make some noise. They, of course, believe the case to be a rather tragic aberration - a man's mind becoming unhinged. And for this they'll give him pills, therapy, and rest. Little do they realize that all Mr. Flemington is suffering from is a case of poetic justice. Tonight's tale of sounds and silences from the Twilight Zone.

== Cast ==
- John McGiver as Roswell G. Flemington
- Penny Singleton as Mrs. Lydia Flemington
- Billy Benedict as Conklin
- Francis De Sales as Doctor
- Michael Fox as Psychiatrist

== Litigation ==
In 1961, a script titled "The Sound of Silence" was submitted to the producers and rejected. Following the first screening of "Sounds and Silences", the original author successfully sued Rod Serling for plagiarism because of similarities in the plot, and was awarded $3,500 in damages. Since litigation was ongoing at the time of the initial syndication package creation the episode was withheld until 1984 when it first resurfaced on a special holiday presentation.
