= The Last Rites of Jeff Myrtlebank =

- The Twilight Zone episode
- Episode no.: Season 3 Episode 23
- Directed by: Montgomery Pittman
- Written by: Montgomery Pittman
- Production code: 4811
- Original air date: February 23, 1962

Guest appearances
- James Best; Sherry Jackson; Edgar Buchanan; Lance Fuller; Dub Taylor; Ralph Moody; Ezelle Poule; Helen Wallace; Vickie Barnes; Jon Lormer; James Houghton; William Fawcett

Episode chronology
← Previous "A Piano in the House"	Next → "To Serve Man"
- The Twilight Zone (1959 TV series) (season 3)

"The Last Rites of Jeff Myrtlebank" is episode 88 of the American television anthology series The Twilight Zone. It originally aired on February 23, 1962 on CBS.

== Opening narration ==
Time, the mid-twenties. Place, the Midwest, the southernmost section of the Midwest. We were just witnessing a funeral, a funeral that didn't come off exactly as planned, due to a slight fallout - from the Twilight Zone.

== Plot ==
In the mid-1920s in a small rural town in the "southernmost section of the Midwest," a man, Jeff Myrtlebank, returns to life at his own funeral, causing the grievers to flee the church. The townspeople believe that the man must be possessed by a "haint" (a ghost or demon), even though the town doctor declares it was more than likely a medical condition that imitated death; his heart stopped days prior after fighting influenza. Jeff seems normal enough, yet he has changed: he has suddenly become a hard worker with exceptional strength, yet consistently eats less since his return.

The townsfolk and doctor discuss it further, where the doctor reveals that Jeff's heart had completely stopped, and that he neither reacted to a pinprick nor fogged a mirror with his breath. Everyone seems as interested in what transpired during the days Jeff was dead as in how he came back to life.

When he goes to visit his girlfriend Comfort, he takes a bouquet of roses, but they are all dead by the time he gives them to her. Afraid, Comfort will not let him touch her after she sees them. As he leaves, her older brother confronts him and tells him to never come back, and they fight. Jeff defeats him readily, punching him in his jaw. This is the first time that Jeff has ever done so, after losing many past fights, and that gains Comfort's sympathy.

After the fight, the townsfolk gather and start saying they need to take care of this evil amongst them. Comfort races off to warn Jeff and to avow her love for him. He proposes to her, but before she can respond to his proposal, angry townspeople arrive to confront the demon they believe is possessing Jeff. They demand that he leave. He insists that Comfort answer his proposal first, and she tells him yes, and that she is willing to go anywhere to be with him. Jeff then makes an inspired speech in which he tells them that they are wrong and have nothing to fear from him. He also slyly threatens that if they are right, it might be in their best interests to be nice to him. They nervously accept the wisdom of this, and promise to attend Jeff and Comfort's wedding.

After the mob disperses, Comfort asks Jeff if he could really do the things he threatened them with, to which he replies that he was lying. As he speaks, he pulls out a pipe and a match, which lights by itself. When Comfort asks how he lit the match, he laughs and claims she is imagining things. He puts his arm around her shoulders to take her inside. As they walk toward the house, the fence gate closes behind them on its own.

== Closing narration ==
Jeff and Comfort are still alive today, and their only son is a United States senator. He's noted as an uncommonly shrewd politician, and some believe he must have gotten his education - in the Twilight Zone.

== Cast ==
- James Best as Jeff Myrtlebank
- Sherry Jackson as Comfort Gatewood
- Edgar Buchanan as Doc Bolton
- Lance Fuller as Orgram Gatewood
- Dub Taylor as Mr. Peters
- Ralph Moody as Pa Myrtlebank
- Ezelle Poule as Ma Myrtlebank
- Helen Wallace as Ma Gatewood
- Vickie Barnes as Liz Myrtlebank
- Jon Lormer as Strauss
- James Houghton as Jerry
- William Fawcett as Rev. Siddons

== Cultural influence ==
Director Ryan Coogler named the episode as one of the influences for his film Sinners.
