= Dead Man's Shoes (The Twilight Zone) =

- The Twilight Zone episode
- Episode no.: Season 3 Episode 18
- Directed by: Montgomery Pittman
- Written by: Charles Beaumont and Ocee Rich (uncredited)
- Production code: 4824
- Original air date: January 19, 1962

Guest appearances
- Warren Stevens; Richard Devon; Joan Marshall; Ben Wright; Harry Swoger; Ron Hagerthy; Florence Marly

Episode chronology
← Previous "One More Pallbearer"	Next → "The Hunt"
- The Twilight Zone (1959 TV series) (season 3)

"Dead Man's Shoes" is episode 83 of the American television anthology series The Twilight Zone and is the 18th episode of the third season. It was written by past series contributor Charles Beaumont and was originally aired on January 19, 1962 on CBS.

== Opening narration ==
Nathan Edward Bledsoe, of the Bowery Bledsoes, a man once, a specter now. One of those myriad modern-day ghosts that haunt the reeking nights of the city in search of a flop, a handout, a glass of forgetfulness. Nate doesn't know it but his search is about to end, because those shiny new shoes are going to carry him right into the capital of the Twilight Zone.

== Plot ==
A homeless man, Nate Bledsoe, snatches a pair of shoes from Dane, the target of a mob hit dumped in an alley. Two of his homeless associates try to con him out of the plainly expensive shoes, to no avail. Wearing the shoes infuses him with the personality and memories of the victim, and he continues his life as Dane.

Nate stops by the home of Dane's girlfriend, who recognizes his manner but remains confused by his appearance. Nate then goes to a bar to confront Dagget, the boss who had him killed. Dagget is at first unsettled, but then realizes who Nate is and has him gunned down. Before he dies, he promises, "I'll be back, Bernie, and I'll keep coming back…again, and again, and I'll get you." The body is dumped in the same place as the original victim. A homeless man finds the corpse, takes the shoes, puts them on, and the cycle begins anew.

== Closing narration ==
There's an old saying that goes, 'If the shoe fits, wear it.' But be careful. If you happen to find a pair of size nine black and gray loafers, made to order in the old country, be very careful. You might walk right into the Twilight Zone.

== Cast ==
- Warren Stevens as Nate Bledsoe
- Richard Devon as Dagget
- Joan Marshall as Wilma
- Ben Wright as Chips
- Harry Swoger as Sam
- Ron Hagerthy as Ben
- Florence Marly as Dagget's girlfriend

== Production ==
The soundtrack uses recycled music from a previous episode, "The Fever".

== Remakes ==
The episode was remade in the 1985 revival as "Dead Woman's Shoes" and in the 2002 revival as "Dead Man's Eyes". This makes it the only original episode to be remade in two of the revival series.
