= The 7th Is Made Up of Phantoms =

- The Twilight Zone episode
- Episode no.: Season 5 Episode 10
- Directed by: Alan Crosland Jr.
- Written by: Rod Serling
- Production code: 2606
- Original air date: December 6, 1963

Guest appearances
- Ron Foster as Sgt. William Connors; Randy Boone as Pvt. Michael McClusky; Warren Oates as Cpl. Richard Langsford; Greg Morris as Lt. Woodard; Jeffrey Morris as Finnigan; Wayne Mallory as Scout; Robert Bray as Captain Dennet

Episode chronology
← Previous "Probe 7, Over and Out"	Next → "A Short Drink from a Certain Fountain"
- The Twilight Zone season 5

"The 7th Is Made Up of Phantoms" is episode 130 of the American television anthology series The Twilight Zone. It originally aired on December 6, 1963 on CBS. In this episode, a group of soldiers travel back in time to take part in the Battle of the Little Bighorn.

== Opening narration ==
June 25, 1964 — or, if you prefer, June 25, 1876. The cast of characters in order of their appearance — a patrol of General Custer's cavalry and a patrol of National Guardsmen on a maneuver. Past and present are about to collide head-on, as they are wont to do in a very special bivouac area known as — the Twilight Zone.

== Plot ==
The show's teaser, set June 25, 1876, depicts an army scout, a sergeant and a trooper finding evidence of Indians. An arrow strikes the scout in the back while the regular soldiers fire their carbines at an unseen foe. The time jumps ahead to the present, June 25, 1964, the 88th anniversary of the Battle of the Little Bighorn. Three United States Army National Guard soldiers (Connors, McCluskey and Langsford) are in an M3 Stuart tank participating in a war game near the site of the Battle of the Little Bighorn, where Lieutenant Colonel George Armstrong Custer made his last stand.

Their orders coincide with the route of Custer and his men. As they follow the route, they hear strange things, such as Indian battle cries and horses running when nobody is there. Connors wonders if they have somehow gone back in time. When they return, Connors reports to his Captain Dennet what occurred and is reprimanded.

The following day the trio go out and again experience strange phenomena. The captain contacts them via radio and orders them to return to base when Connors tries to explain what is happening. Connors breaks contact and the captain sends his lieutenant and two men to bring them in. The tank crew, however, abandon their tank and continue on foot with their modern weapons. They find a group of teepees and McCluskey investigates. He soon returns with an arrow protruding from his back. The three men climb a ridge, where below they see a battle taking place. Together they move forward to join the conflict and are never seen again.

Later, Captain Dennet enters the "Custer Battlefield National Monument". Lieutenant Woodard, the officer sent to find the tank and the three soldiers, reports that all he found was the abandoned tank. The captain and lieutenant soon walk past the battlefield's large stone obelisk carved with the names of Custer and all the soldiers who died with the general at the Little Big Horn. Dennet and Woodard are suddenly startled to see the names of their missing men also carved into the memorial.

Initially, Woodard proposes that it might be an extraordinary coincidence that the names are identical to those of their own soldiers. Dennet, however, seems unable or unwilling to accept that possibility and simply states that it is "too bad" his missing National Guardsmen could not have taken their tank into the 1876 battle.

== Closing narration ==
Sergeant William Connors, Trooper Michael McCluskey, and Trooper Richard Langsford, who, on a hot afternoon in June, made a charge over a hill — and never returned. Look for this one under "P" for phantom, in a historical ledger located in a reading room known as the Twilight Zone.

== Cast ==
- Ron Foster as Sgt. William Connors
- Randy Boone as Pvt. Michael McCluskey
- Warren Oates as Cpl. Richard Langsford
- Greg Morris as Lieutenant Woodard
- Jeffrey Morris as Finnigan
- Wayne Mallory as Scout
- Robert Bray as Captain Dennet
- Lew Brown as Sergeant
- Jacques Shelton as Corporal
