= The Self-Improvement of Salvadore Ross =

- The Twilight Zone episode
- Episode no.: Season 5 Episode 16
- Directed by: Don Siegel
- Teleplay by: Jerry McNeely
- Based on: "The Self-Improvement of Salvadore Ross" by Henry Slesar
- Production code: 2612
- Original air date: January 17, 1964

Guest appearances
- Don Gordon: Salvadore Ross; Gail Kobe: Leah Maitland; Vaughn Taylor: Mr. Maitland; J. Pat O'Malley: Old Man; Douglass Dumbrille: Mr. Halpert; Douglas Lambert: Albert Rowe; Seymour Cassel: Jerry (uncredited); Ted Jacques: Bartender (uncredited); Kathleen O'Malley: Nurse (uncredited)

Episode chronology
← Previous "The Long Morrow"	Next → "Number 12 Looks Just Like You"
- The Twilight Zone (1959 TV series) (season 5)

"The Self-Improvement of Salvadore Ross" is an episode of the American television anthology series The Twilight Zone. In this episode, a man finds he has the ability to trade anything, even personal traits and conditions, with whoever agrees to the swap.

== Opening narration ==
Confidential personnel file on Salvadore Ross. Personality: a volatile mixture of fury and frustration. Distinguishing physical characteristic: a badly broken hand, which will require emergency treatment at the nearest hospital. Ambition: shows great determination towards self-improvement. Estimate of potential success: a sure bet for a listing in Who's Who in the Twilight Zone.

== Plot ==
Salvadore Ross is a brash, insensitive, ambitious 26-year-old man who desires a lovely young social worker named Leah Maitland. Leah and Ross dated for a time, but she broke off the relationship because their personalities are incompatible. When Ross continues to bother her, Leah puts her foot down and finally ends things. He has been so loud that her father comes outside to see if she is all right. After a curt exchange, Leah and her father go inside and Ross slams his fist into the closed door, breaking his hand. This sends him to a local hospital, where he is forced to spend the evening. Ross' roommate is an elderly man with a respiratory infection. Ross sarcastically suggests that he would like to trade ailments with the old man, who jokingly accepts the trade and they go to sleep. Salvadore turns over quickly and hits his hand. He then realizes it no longer hurts and begins to unwrap it. As he unwraps it, he begins to cough. He gets out of the bed and checks the other man, whose hand has begun to hurt. The old man begs Ross to reverse this (at his age, the hand wouldn't heal properly), but Ross dismisses him.

Ross realizes he has a supernatural power to make trades with other people. In exchange for US$1,000,000 (equivalent to $10,381,000 in 2025) and a penthouse apartment, Ross sells his youth to an elderly millionaire. As a result Ross is now very rich, but old. He offers a number of young men (beginning with a hotel bellboy) $1,000 (equivalent to $10,000 in 2025) for each year of their lives they trade to him. In short order, Ross is 26 again.

Ross is now young, rich, and (thanks to a trade with a college student) well-spoken, so he goes to Leah's apartment. Her father is there and unimpressed with the superficial change in Ross, knowing that he does not love Leah, but simply wishes to possess her. Leah comes home and, after she sees Salvadore has changed his ways some, agrees to go to dinner with him. However, by the end of the date she is again repulsed by Ross's personality. She wants a man who is as caring and compassionate as her father. Frustrated, Ross approaches Mr. Maitland, who is kind to him despite his disrespectful and condescending demeanor, but does not think he would be a good husband for his daughter. Ross offers him $100,000 (equivalent to $1,038,000 in 2025) to make him and Leah financially secure in exchange for something from Mr. Maitland. When the father asks what he wants in exchange, Ross replies: "Well, it's a little hard to explain..."

The next day, Ross has become warm and compassionate, and he has won Leah's heart. Ross meets with Mr. Maitland in private to apologize for his previous behavior and asks for his permission to marry Leah. Maitland refuses. Ross implores the older man to show compassion. Maitland coldly replies: "Compassion? Don't you remember? I sold that to you yesterday." He then shoots Ross dead.

== Closing narration ==
The Salvadore Ross program for self-improvement. The all-in-one, sure-fire success course that lets you lick the bully, learn the language, dance the tango and anything else you want to do. Or think you want to do. Money-back guarantee. Offer limited to...the Twilight Zone.

== In other media ==
Henry Slesar adapted his story for an episode of the CBS Radio Mystery Theater, A Bargain in Blood, which was broadcast on June 10, 1974.
