= Long Live Walter Jameson =

- The Twilight Zone episode
- Episode no.: Season 1 Episode 24
- Directed by: Anton Leader
- Written by: Charles Beaumont
- Production code: 173-3621
- Original air date: March 18, 1960

Guest appearances
- Kevin McCarthy as Walter Jameson/Tom Bowen/Maj. Hugh Skelton; Edgar Stehli as Prof. Samuel Kittridge; Estelle Winwood as Laurette Bowen; Dody Heath as Susanna Kittridge

Episode chronology
← Previous "A World of Difference"	Next → "People Are Alike All Over"
- The Twilight Zone (1959 TV series, season 1)

"Long Live Walter Jameson" is episode 24 of the American television anthology series The Twilight Zone.

== Opening narration ==
You're looking at Act One, Scene One, of a nightmare, one not restricted to witching hours of dark, rainswept nights. Professor Walter Jameson, popular beyond words, who talks of the past as if it were the present, who conjures up the dead as if they were alive.

The narration continues after the camera cuts to an elderly man seated among the students during Walter's lecture.

In the view of this man, Professor Samuel Kittridge, Walter Jameson has access to knowledge that couldn't come out of a volume of history, but rather from a book on black magic, which is to say that this nightmare begins at noon.

== Plot ==
Walter Jameson, a professor of history at an unnamed college, is engaged to one of his doctoral students, Susanna Kittridge. Susanna's father Sam, another professor at the college, becomes suspicious of Walter, who does not appear to have aged in the twelve years they have known each other and seems to have unrealistically detailed knowledge of some pieces of history that do not appear in texts. Walter at one point reads from an original Civil War diary in his possession. Later, Sam spots the diary's author, Major Hugh Skelton, in a Mathew Brady Civil War photograph and finds that Walter looks exactly like Skelton.

After Sam presents the evidence, Walter admits that he is indeed Skelton, but is far older, and implies he knew Plato personally. Fearing death as a young man, he offered himself to an alchemist seeking to devise a means of immortality. Walter woke up to find the alchemist missing and at first believed that the experiments failed but then had to watch as his family and friends grew old and died while he remained young. Having become cynical and embittered after centuries of wandering the Earth and changing identities, Walter purchased a revolver some time ago to commit suicide, but has lost his nerve and now hides it in a desk drawer.

When questioned, Walter admits that he loves Susanna, but that he has also loved many women before her, and that he will have to eventually leave her. Horrified, Sam refuses to consent to the wedding. An unmoved Walter then tells Susanna that they will elope and get married that evening. He dismisses her father by telling him that he has no actual proof of his immortality and people would think him insane if he persists.

Stopping to collect some things from his office, Walter is confronted by Laurette Bowen, a widow who identifies him as her "late" husband Tom. Having found the gun on his desk, she shoots Jameson in the chest and leaves. Sam finds him and watches as Walter, now at peace, rapidly ages and collapses on the floor. Susanna arrives and Sam tries to stop her, but by the time she forces her way past him, all that is left of Walter is his clothes and shoes covered with dust. When Susanna asks what is on the floor, the professor replies, "Dust, only dust."

== Closing narration ==
Last stop on a long journey, as yet another human being returns to the vast nothingness that is the beginning and into the dust that is always the end.

== Makeup effects ==
The scenes of Walter Jameson's aging were performed by using an old movie-making trick. Age lines were drawn on actor Kevin McCarthy's face in red make-up. During the beginning of the scene, red lighting was used, bathing the scene in red and hiding the age lines. As the scene progressed, the red lights were turned down and green lights were brought up. Under the green lights, the red age lines were prominent. The lighting changes were unseen by the audience because it was filmed in black-and-white. A subsequent episode, "Queen of the Nile", used a similar effect.

== Home media ==
For the DVD release Kevin McCarthy returned to record an audio commentary for the episode, revealing that he never met Rod Serling and that, aside from Invasion of the Body Snatchers, his appearance in this episode generated the most fan mail he ever received.

== See also ==
- Immortality in fiction
- The Man from Earth – a 2007 film with a similar premise
