= I Shot an Arrow into the Air =

- The Twilight Zone episode
- Episode no.: Season 1 Episode 15
- Directed by: Stuart Rosenberg
- Story by: Madelon Champion
- Teleplay by: Rod Serling
- Production code: 173-3626
- Original air date: January 15, 1960

Guest appearances
- Dewey Martin as Officer Corey; Edward Binns as Colonel Donlin; Ted Otis as Pierson; Harry Bartell as Langford; Leslie Barrett as Brandt

Episode chronology
← Previous "Third from the Sun"	Next → "The Hitch-Hiker"
- The Twilight Zone (1959 TV series, season 1)

"I Shot an Arrow into the Air" is the fifteenth episode of the American television anthology series The Twilight Zone.

== Opening narration ==
Her name is the Arrow One. She represents four and a half years of planning, preparation and training, and a thousand years of science and mathematics and the projected dreams and hopes of not only a nation but a world. She is the first manned aircraft into space. And this is the countdown, the last five seconds before man shot an arrow into the air.

== Plot ==
A crewed space flight with eight astronauts crash lands on what they believe to be an unknown asteroid, with an area of desert and jagged mountains. Only four of the crew survive the crash: the commanding officer Donlin, crewmen Corey and Pierson, and a crewman named Hudak who is badly injured and barely alive; and the chances of rescue or survival are bleak. After they bury the dead men, Donlin and Pierson concern themselves with taking care of Hudak, but Corey, who is only concerned with saving himself, declares that sharing their limited supply of water with Hudak will reduce the chances of survival for the rest of them. This sets Corey at odds with both Pierson and Donlin, who insist that they will care for Hudak and share their water with him for as long as he does survive. Hudak dies a short time later; after they bury him, Donlin has Corey and Pierson trek out into the barren desert to see if there is anything that might improve their chances of survival.

Six hours later, Corey returns alone, claiming not to know where Pierson went. Donlin calls Corey out on having more water in his canteen now than he had when he left, and demands to know where Pierson is. Corey claims that he found Pierson dead and took his water. Not believing this account, Donlin wants to see for himself and forces Corey at gunpoint to lead him to Pierson's body. When they reach the spot Corey claims to have found Pierson, the body is not there, nor is there any evidence that backs Corey's claim, leaving Donlin more dubious. They later find Pierson near the edge of a mountain, alive but severely wounded. Donlin drops the gun and rushes to Pierson, who wordlessly gestures that he climbed the mountain and saw something. With his last bit of strength, Pierson draws a primitive diagram in the sand with his finger (two parallel lines intersected by a perpendicular line), and then dies. Meanwhile, Corey grabs the dropped gun, and confesses that he attacked Pierson earlier. He then shoots and kills Donlin and sets out alone, confident that he will survive longer now that he has all of the water for himself.

Now you make tracks, Mr. Corey. You move out and up like some kind of ghostly billy club was tapping at your ankles and telling you that it was later than you'd think. You scrabble up rock hills and feel hot sand underneath your feet and every now and then, take a look over your shoulder at a giant sun suspended in a dead and motionless sky...like an unblinking eye that probes at the back of your head in a prolonged accusation.

Mr. Corey, last remaining member of a doomed crew, keep moving. Make tracks, Mr. Corey. Push up and push out because if you stop...if you stop, maybe sanity will get you by the throat. Maybe realization will pry open your mind and the horror you left down in the sand will seep in. Yeah, Mr. Corey, yeah, you better keep moving. That's the order of the moment: keep moving.

Corey climbs a mountain and sees a sign for Reno, along with telephone poles, which was what Pierson had attempted to draw before he died. Realizing that they had in fact never left Earth and that he had killed his partners for nothing, Corey breaks down weeping and begging his deceased crewmates for forgiveness.

== Closing narration ==
Practical joke perpetrated by Mother Nature and a combination of improbable events. Practical joke wearing the trappings of nightmare, of terror, of desperation. Small human drama played out in a desert ninety-seven miles from Reno, Nevada, U.S.A., continent of North America, the Earth — and of course the Twilight Zone.

== Production ==
Madelon Champion came up with the idea for the story and Rod Serling purchased it for $500 (equivalent to $5,522 in 2025). Champion told Serling "What would happen if three guys landed on what they thought was an asteroid and it turned out to be outside of Las Vegas?" This was the only time that Serling accepted an episode proposal that was made by somebody who approached him in public.

The title was derived from a line in Henry Wadsworth Longfellow's poem "The Arrow and the Song." Before the pilot of The Twilight Zone, Serling wrote an hour-long pilot titled "I Shot an Arrow Into the Air," unrelated to Champion's idea, which was about an intelligent boy who was shunned by other children because his father died when his home-made rocket ship exploded. He befriends a wounded alien and helps him return to his home planet; the boy grows up to be an astronaut and reunites with the alien. Elements of the script were reworked into "The Gift."

Stuart Rosenberg directed the episode and George T. Clemens was the director of photography. Filming was done in October. This was the second episode of The Twilight Zone to be filmed in Death Valley; "The Lonely" was the first.

The ending twist that the characters were on Earth the entire time was noted to be similar to the twist in Planet of the Apes, an idea conceived by Serling.

== Works cited ==
- Weiss, Josh (April 8, 2025). "Why the Cast & Crew of This Classic Twilight Zone Episode Ate Salads for Most of Shooting". Syfy. Archived from the original on April 12, 2025.
- Zicree, Marc (1982). The Twilight Zone Companion. Bantam Books. ISBN 0553014161.
