= Spur of the Moment (The Twilight Zone) =

- The Twilight Zone episode
- Episode no.: Season 5 Episode 21
- Directed by: Elliot Silverstein
- Written by: Richard Matheson
- Production code: 2608
- Original air date: February 21, 1964

Guest appearances
- Diana Hyland: Anne Henderson; Robert J. Hogan: Robert Blake; Philip Ober: Mr. Henderson; Marsha Hunt: Mrs. Henderson; Roger Davis: David Mitchell; Jack Raine: Reynolds

Episode chronology
← Previous "From Agnes—With Love"	Next → "An Occurrence at Owl Creek Bridge"
- The Twilight Zone (1959 TV series) (season 5)

"Spur of the Moment" is episode 141 of the American television anthology series The Twilight Zone. In this episode, a young woman is set upon by a mysterious and terrifying woman dressed in black just hours before her engagement. Alternating between scenes set 25 years apart, the episode explores themes of regret and the danger of yielding to passion.

== Opening narration ==
This is the face of terror. Anne Marie Henderson, 18 years of age, her young existence suddenly marred by a savage and wholly unanticipated pursuit by a strange, nightmarish figure of a woman in black, who has appeared as if from nowhere and now, at driving gallop, chases the terrified girl across the countryside, as if she means to ride her down and kill her, and then suddenly and inexplicably stops to watch in malignant silence as her prey takes flight. Miss Henderson has no idea whatever as to the motive for this pursuit. Worse, not the vaguest notion regarding the identity of her pursuer. Soon enough, she will be given the solution to this twofold mystery, but in a manner far beyond her present capacity to understand, a manner enigmatically bizarre in terms of time and space - which is to say, an answer from... the Twilight Zone.

== Plot ==
On June 13, 1939, 18-year-old Anne Henderson rides a horse across her family's property. Up on a ridge, a fierce woman dressed all in black on a stallion screams her name at her, “Anne!”. Anne, petrified, races towards her home with the strange woman in fast pursuit before breaking off the chase. When Anne arrives home, her parents and her investment banker fiancé, Robert, are waiting for her there. She tells them of her frightful experience and that she believes the woman wanted to kill her. Her parents and Robert calm her down and talk of the upcoming marriage. Anne, however, is plainly uncomfortable with Robert, who is stiff and makes insensitive jokes.

Her former fiancé, David Mitchell, whom she has known since childhood, appears at the door. Arrogantly forcing his way inside past an elderly retainer, David pleads with Anne to call off her wedding and be with him. David and Robert have words, and David knocks Robert down but does not cause any serious harm. Anne can't bring herself to answer David's question or to look him in the eye as he challenges her to do. Anne's father tells David to consider her silence the answer and then forces him to leave the house at gunpoint.

Twenty-five years later, Anne is a miserable alcoholic. She tells her mother her recollection of what happened up on the ridge, pointing out that there is a saying, "Go chase yourself," and she realizes she has been doing just that. Her mother, having received another phone call from an otherwise unidentified lawyer, is devastated about losing the estate in a pending dispossession and seems uninterested in her daughter's metaphysical time-traveling marvel. Anne disparages her now deceased father for spoiling her and not allowing her to earn anything or learn such things as judgment and discrimination. Her mother slaps her for "debasing" her father's memory, and Anne slaps her back, declaring her mother's comments to be "cornball". Anne asks her mother if she remembers that night, 25 years earlier, when she came home terrified after riding her horse. Anne now realizes she was pursuing her younger self on horseback, trying to warn herself not to marry the wrong man. She notes that her dissolute and abusive husband has bankrupted the estate through mismanagement. But her husband is not Robert but the arrogant, pushy, mercurial David, with whom Anne eloped from her engagement party 25 years ago.

The older Anne leaves the house for another ride on horseback. She again approaches the ridge line and sees her younger self down below. She pursues the young Anne with her warning, and her words are now audible: "Anne...wait...come back!" but the younger Anne still cannot hear her, and the older Anne is still unable to catch her.

== Closing narration ==
This is the face of terror. Anne Marie Mitchell, 43 years of age, her desolate existence once more afflicted by the hope of altering her past mistake - a hope which is unfortunately doomed to disappointment. For warnings from the future to the past must be taken in the past. Today may change tomorrow, but once today is gone, tomorrow can only look back in sorrow that the warning was ignored. Said warning as of now stamped 'Not Accepted'- and stored away in the dead file, in the recording office... of the Twilight Zone.
