= In His Image =

- The Twilight Zone episode
- Scene from the episode.
- Episode no.: Season 4 Episode 1
- Directed by: Perry Lafferty
- Written by: Charles Beaumont
- Based on: "In His Image" by Charles Beaumont
- Production code: 4851
- Original air date: January 3, 1963

Guest appearances
- George Grizzard; Gail Kobe; Katherine Squire; Wallace Rooney; James Seay; George O. Petrie

Episode chronology
← Previous "The Changing of the Guard"	Next → "The Thirty Fathom Grave"
- The Twilight Zone (1959 TV series) (season 4)

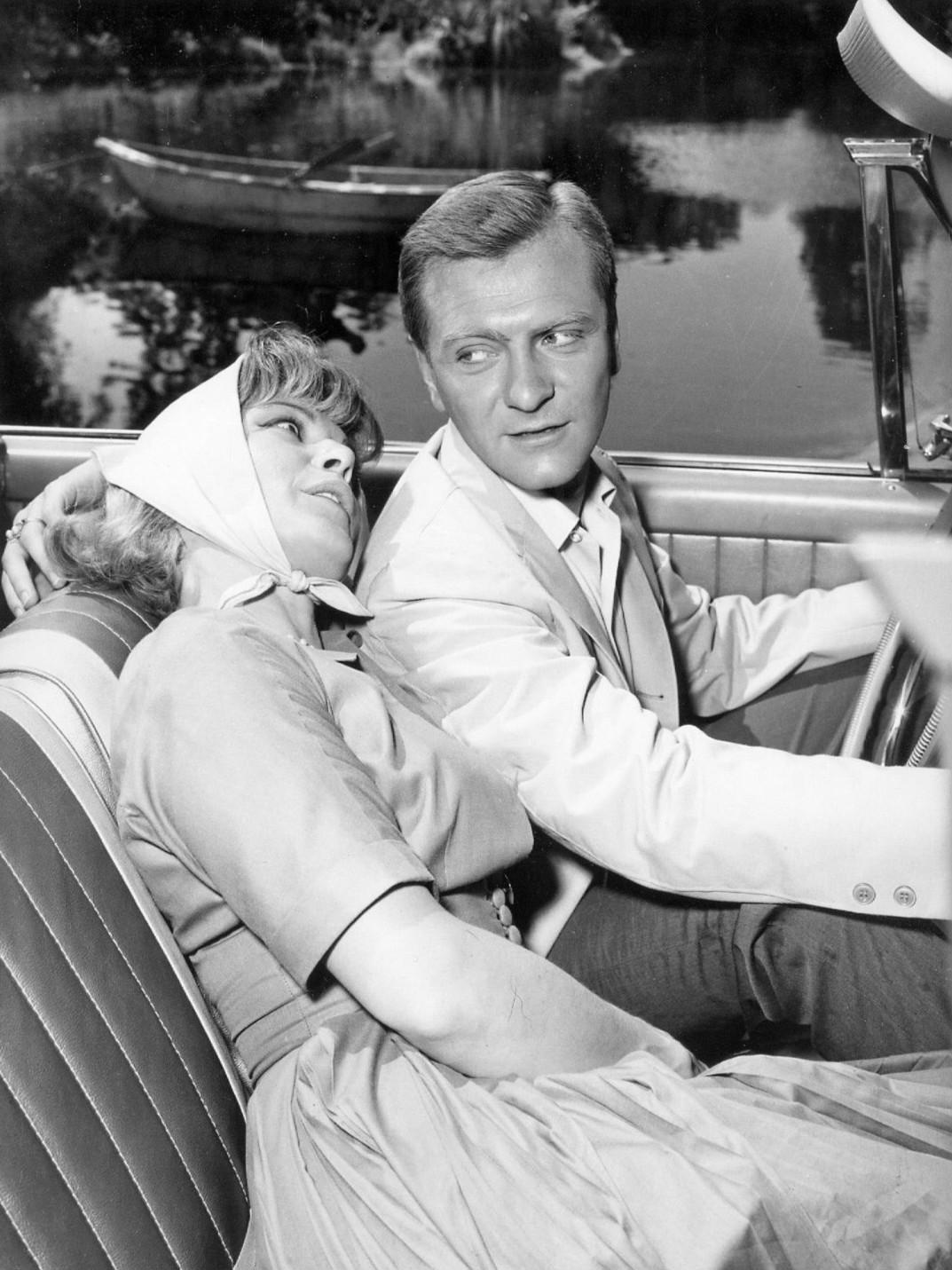
Gail Kobe and George Grizzard

"In His Image" is an episode of the American television anthology series The Twilight Zone aired on January 3, 1963. This was the first episode of the fourth season. Each episode was expanded to an hour (with commercials) from "In His Image" until "The Bard". The fourth season is the only season of The Twilight Zone to have each episode one hour long. In this episode, a man finds his hometown is suddenly inconsistent with his memories of it and begins experiencing irrational urges to commit murder, two mysteries which together lead him to an unpleasant discovery about his identity.

== Opening narration ==
What you have just witnessed could be the end of a particularly terrifying nightmare. It isn't – it's the beginning. Although Alan Talbot doesn't know it, he's about to enter a strange new world, too incredible to be real, too real to be a dream. It's called The Twilight Zone.

== Plot ==
While waiting in a subway station, Alan Talbot is approached by an evangelist. Alan is not interested, but takes the pamphlet she offers in order to appease her; however, the evangelist won't leave him alone. He hears strange electronic noises which prompt him to throw her under a train and then flee the scene.

Later Alan, seemingly having no memory of the murder he committed, visits the home of his fiancée, Jessica Connelly. Though he met Jessica only four days before, they have already set a date for their wedding, and Alan is taking her to his hometown of Coeurville to meet his aunt Mildred, who raised him. When they arrive, almost everything in the town is as Alan remembers, but another man is living in his house, the university where he was employed is gone, and all of the people he knew are either said to have died years ago, or else there is no record that they ever existed. In the place where his parents were buried, he instead finds a tombstone with the name "Walter Ryder"; seeing this name seems to trigger a repressed memory in Alan.

Alan and Jessica give up and head back home. On the drive, Alan hears the electrical noises again, and this time is able to make out the sound of himself talking to a "Walter" among them. He tells Jessica to stop the car, runs out, and picks up a rock to kill her with. He fights back this urge and screams at Jessica to get as far away from him as possible. She reluctantly gets back in the car and drives off just as Alan's homicidal urge subsides. Disoriented by his frustrated urge to kill, he lingers in the road until a car hits him. The driver applies the brakes in enough time that Alan is not gravely hurt, but a deep cut in his wrist is bizarrely not bleeding. Alan peels back his "skin" to find metal rods and wiring underneath instead of flesh and bone.

Jessica calls Alan after he returns to the city. She is now convinced that he needs mental help and has made an appointment for him with a psychiatrist. He agrees to go with her to the appointment, but knows from his robotic arm that his problems go beyond mental issues. Intuiting that "Walter Ryder" is the key, he looks up Walter in a phone book and pays him an unannounced visit. Walter turns out to be his physical double. Walter explains that Alan is an android he developed using funds from a calculator he invented, using help from some of the world's greatest scientists, and his own self-professed genius. He created Alan's memory by using his own memories of Coeurville, which he left 20 years before, and filling in the blanks with a fictional aunt Mildred and a job at a fictional university. Alan was designed to be a perfect version of Walter - to be outgoing, bold and charming, while the real Walter is shy, self-pitying and socially awkward. Walter admits his scientific reach exceeded his grasp, and there are aspects of his creation which he does not understand. A week ago, Alan suddenly tried to kill Walter, stabbed him with a pair of scissors, and ran away.

Alan is outraged that Walter created an artificial human without considering the consequences, in particular the situation with Jessica. Walter is sympathetic but has no idea how to even diagnose the cause of Alan's homicidal episodes, much less correct it, and points out that Alan has no chance of a normal life with Jessica anyway, since he doesn't age. Alan then demands that Walter replace him with a properly functioning android who will love and care for Jessica, and writes down her address for Walter on some scrap paper taken from his pocket. When he recognizes the scrap paper is the pamphlet the evangelist gave him, it triggers another malfunction and he tries to kill Walter.

After the struggle, the survivor goes to Jessica and asks her to forget about his strange behavior of the past couple of days, saying that the nightmare is over and he will tell her what happened someday. In the final scene, it is revealed that the survivor is Walter and that Alan's broken form lies amid the wreckage of the laboratory.

== Closing narration ==
In a way, it can be said that Walter Ryder succeeded in his life's ambition, even though the man he created was, after all, himself. There may be easier ways to self-improvement, but sometimes it happens that the shortest distance between two points is a crooked line – through the Twilight Zone.

== Cast ==
- George Grizzard as Alan Talbot/Walter Ryder Jr.
- Gail Kobe as Jessica Connelly
- Katherine Squire as Old Woman
- Wallace Rooney as Man
- James Seay as Sheriff
- George O. Petrie as Driver

== Reception and legacy ==
The first two sentences of this episode's opening narration were sampled at the very end of the 2001 Michael Jackson album Invincible on the track "Threatened".

== Sources ==
- DeVoe, Bill. (2008). Trivia from The Twilight Zone. Albany, GA: Bear Manor Media. ISBN 978-1-59393-136-0
- Grams, Martin. (2008). The Twilight Zone: Unlocking the Door to a Television Classic. Churchville, MD: OTR Publishing. ISBN 978-0-9703310-9-0
