= Four O'Clock (The Twilight Zone) =

- The Twilight Zone episode
- Episode no.: Season 3 Episode 29
- Directed by: Lamont Johnson
- Teleplay by: Rod Serling
- Based on: "Four O'Clock" by Price Day
- Production code: 4832
- Original air date: April 6, 1962

Guest appearances
- Theodore Bikel: Oliver Crangle; Moyna Macgill: Mrs. Williams; Phyllis Love: Mrs. Lucas; Linden Chiles: Luther Hall, FBI agent

Episode chronology
← Previous "The Little People"	Next → "Hocus-Pocus and Frisby"
- The Twilight Zone (1959 TV series) (season 3)

"Four O'Clock" is episode 94 (season 3, number 29) of the American television anthology series The Twilight Zone.

== Opening narration ==
That's Oliver Crangle, a dealer in petulance and poison. He's rather arbitrarily chosen four o'clock as his personal Götterdämmerung, and we are about to watch the metamorphosis of a twisted fanatic, poisoned by the gangrene of prejudice, to the status of an avenging angel, upright and omniscient, dedicated and fearsome. Whatever your clocks say, it's four o'clock, and wherever you are it happens to be - the Twilight Zone.

== Plot ==
Oliver Crangle is a hate-ridden fanatic who lives in an apartment with his parrot, Pete. He maintains records of people he believes to be "evil" and has convinced himself that the so called "evil" people (communists, subversives, thieves, murderers) are engaged in a worldwide conspiracy and have taken over Washington. He makes phone calls to them and their employers at all hours, writes letters regarding their actions, demands their prompt firing, and threatens to involve higher authorities if they do not comply. Unsatisfied with the results of his anonymous calls and letters, he searches for a more effective way to eliminate evil from the world; he settles on the idea of shrinking all evil people to two feet tall. Throughout the episode, Crangle's parrot Pete periodically calls out "nut," asking for a nut to eat, which Crangle gives him.

His landlady Mrs. Williams arrives, whom he berates and treats horribly to make her leave. Mrs. Lucas also comes to Crangle's apartment and pleads for Crangle to leave her husband, a doctor, alone. Crangle is convinced that because her husband was unable to save the life of a woman in the ER who died from her injuries, that he is a murderer and evil. Due to Crangle's letter writing to the hospital, her husband has started to feel extremely guilty for the woman's death, and Mrs. Lucas wants Crangle to stop. Crangle simply believes that those people are also evil. Mrs. Lucas leaves, realizing Crangle is insane.

Crangle calls a number of government agencies, and Agent Hall of the FBI is sent to investigate. Crangle tells him of his plan to shrink every evil person at 4 o'clock that afternoon through sheer force of will, mentioning his belief about a global conspiracy involving the evil people of the world. He also mentions that he has tried such feats before (trying to turn wheels into triangle shapes due to believing that evil uses public transportation to move). He believes that by shrinking all evil people to two feet tall, that they will be unable to carry on their everyday lives and eventually become extinct. Hall asks Crangle if he has ever had any psychiatric help and tells Crangle that they do not need his kind of help because they have the law. Hall says that both support and help in upholding the law are appreciated, but what Crangle is doing is instead interference. Crangle accuses him of being in on the conspiracy. As Hall leaves, Crangle screams at him that he too will be two feet tall in just 20 minutes. When 4 o'clock rolls around, Crangle gloats on his imminent triumph to Pete, who calls out "nut" but then adds, "Certainly, Peter. This is kind of a celebration." Crangle is then horrified to find that he himself has been shrunk to two feet tall. As he struggles in vain to get up to his windowsill before collapsing in anguish, Pete calls out the word "nut" one last time, implying that he had been insulting Crangle by calling him a "nut" the entire time.

In the radio adaptation starring Stan Freberg, the ending was altered to be more gruesome as Pete mistakes the now-shrunken Crangle for a "nut" and eats him.

== Closing narration ==
At four o'clock, an evil man made his bed and lay in it, a pot called a kettle black, a stone-thrower broke the windows of his glass house. You look for this one under 'F' for fanatic and 'J' for justice in the Twilight Zone.
