= Person or Persons Unknown =

- The Twilight Zone episode
- Episode no.: Season 3 Episode 27
- Directed by: John Brahm
- Written by: Charles Beaumont
- Production code: 4829
- Original air date: March 23, 1962

Guest appearances
- Richard Long: David Gurney; Frank Silvera: Doctor Koslenko; Shirley Ballard: Wilma #1; Julie Van Zandt: Wilma #2; Betty Harford: Woman Clerk; Edmund Glover: Sam Baker; Michael Keep: Policeman; Joe Higgins: Bank Guard; John Newton: Mr. Cooper; Robert McCord: Man on Steps Eating Apple; John Brahm: "Winston Churchill"

Episode chronology
← Previous "Little Girl Lost"	Next → "The Little People"
- The Twilight Zone (1959 TV series) (season 3)

"Person or Persons Unknown" is episode 92 of the American television anthology series The Twilight Zone.

== Opening narration ==
Cameo of a man who has just lost his most valuable possession. He doesn't know about the loss yet. In fact, he doesn't even know about the possession. Because, like most people, David Gurney has never really thought about the matter of his identity. But he's going to be thinking a great deal about it from now on, because that is what he's lost. And his search for it is going to take him into the darkest corners of - the Twilight Zone.

== Plot ==
David Gurney wakes up from a night of wild partying to find that nobody recognizes him, and all evidence of his identity has disappeared. His wife, friends, co-workers, and mother all deny knowing him.

He is placed in an insane asylum, where his doctor, Koslenko, tells him that David Gurney does not exist, and is only a delusional construct. Gurney deems this impossible since he has extensive memories of his life and the people he knows, and becomes convinced that someone wants to blot him out. He jumps through the window of the asylum, steals a van, and goes searching for evidence of his identity.

He finds a photograph of him holding his wife, and says that the photo and its date disprove his wife's claim that she never saw him before. However, when the police arrive with the psychiatrist, the picture has somehow changed and portrays Gurney alone, inexplicably grasping thin air. He throws himself to the ground and wakes up in his bed.

The whole adventure was a bad dream. His wife, Wilma, gets up from the bed and talks to him from the bathroom, where she removes cream from her face. When she emerges, Gurney is horrified to discover that, even though she acts and talks the same way, his wife does not look at all like the wife he knows.

== Closing narration ==
"A case of mistaken identity or a nightmare turned inside out? A simple loss of memory or the end of the world? David Gurney may never find the answer, but you can be sure he's looking for it - in the Twilight Zone."

== See also ==
- Nowhere Man (TV series)
- Flow My Tears, the Policeman Said
