= Black Leather Jackets =

- The Twilight Zone episode
- Episode no.: Season 5 Episode 18
- Directed by: Joseph M. Newman
- Written by: Earl Hamner, Jr.
- Production code: 2628
- Original air date: January 31, 1964

Guest appearances
- Lee Kinsolving as Scott; Michael Forest as Steve; Tom Gilleran as Fred; Michael Conrad as Police Officer/Alien; Shelley Fabares as Ellen Tillman; Denver Pyle as Stuart Tillman; Irene Hervey as Martha Tillman

Episode chronology
← Previous "Number 12 Looks Just Like You"	Next → "Night Call"
- The Twilight Zone (1959 TV series) (season 5)

"Black Leather Jackets" is episode 138 of the American television anthology series The Twilight Zone. In this episode, three aliens disguised as young men in leather jackets encounter a kink in their plan to exterminate humankind when one of them falls in love with a human girl.

== Opening narration ==
Three strangers arrive in a small town; three men in black leather jackets in an empty, rented house. We'll call them Steve, and Scott, and Fred, but their names are not important; their mission is, as three men on motorcycles lead us into the Twilight Zone.

== Plot ==
Alien symbol from The Twilight Zone episode "Black Leather Jackets".

Three beings, disguised as human males wearing leather jackets, are part of an advanced alien invasion force, sent to Earth to infect city water reservoirs with bacteria that will kill all humans and domestic animals. Their own race needs room to expand. The pretext given for the extermination is that humans are violent and hateful and therefore deserve to be destroyed. Calling themselves "Scott", "Steve" and "Fred", they rent a house in a suburban American town where they can keep in contact with their planet's leader while setting the plan in motion.

The youngest of the three aliens, Scott, falls in love with the girl who lives next door to their rented house, Ellen Tillman. Scott eventually tells Ellen about the alien plan in order to convince her to run away with him so that she will escape death, but Ellen naturally mistakes his story for lunatic rantings. Ellen's father calls the local sheriff to take Scott away. The deputy who answers the call is part of the invasion force.

Meanwhile, Scott contacts the leader of his world. Believing the reports describing humans as inherently violent were made in error, he informs the leader that while violent individuals exist, as in all races, the majority of humans are essentially loving and peaceful, and implores him to call off the invasion. The leader refuses and deems Scott a traitor. Scott returns to Ellen's house, in hope to persuade her. The deputy is waiting for him and takes him away. The Tillmans comfort their daughter, not realizing they are doomed by the upcoming alien invasion.

== Closing narration ==
Portrait of an American family on the eve of invasion from outer space. Of course, we know it's merely fiction—and yet, think twice when you drink your next glass of water. Find out if it's from your local reservoir, or possibly it came direct to you....from the Twilight Zone.
