= A World of Difference =

- The Twilight Zone episode
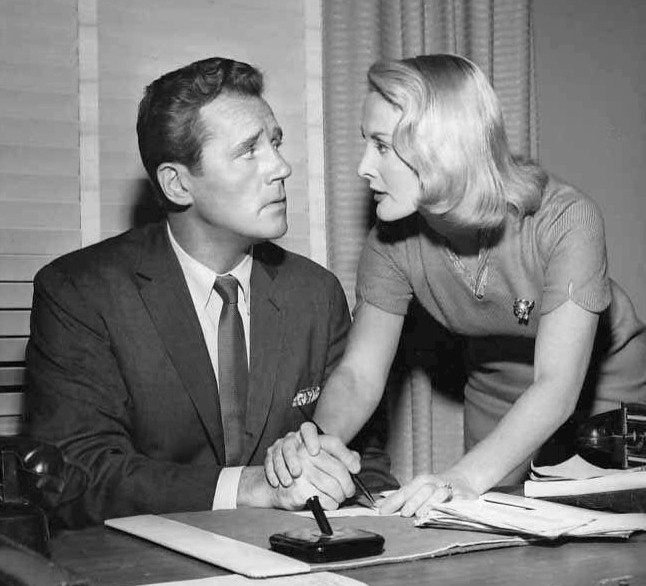
- Howard Duff and Eileen Ryan in "A World of Difference"
- Episode no.: Season 1 Episode 23
- Directed by: Ted Post
- Written by: Richard Matheson
- Production code: 173-3624
- Original air date: March 11, 1960

Guest appearances
- Howard Duff as Arthur Curtis/Gerald "Gerry" Raigan; Eileen Ryan as Nora Raigan; David White as Brinkley; Gail Kobe as Sally; Peter Walker as Sam; Susan Dorn as Marian Curtis; Frank Maxwell as Marty Fisher; Bill Idelson as Stagehand; Thomas Martin as Technician; Robert McCord as Camera Crew Member

Episode chronology
← Previous "The Monsters Are Due on Maple Street"	Next → "Long Live Walter Jameson"
- The Twilight Zone (1959 TV series, season 1)

"A World of Difference" is the twenty-third episode of the American television anthology series The Twilight Zone.

== Opening narration ==
You're looking at a tableau of reality, things of substance, of physical material: a desk, a window, a light. These things exist and have dimension. Now this is Arthur Curtis, age thirty-six, who also is real. He has flesh and blood, muscle and mind. But in just a moment we will see how thin a line separates that which we assume to be real with that manufactured inside of a mind.

== Plot ==
Arthur Curtis is a successful businessman planning a vacation to San Francisco with his loving wife Marian. After arriving at his office and talking with his secretary Sally, he finds that his telephone is not functional and, hearing someone yell "cut", he discovers his office is a movie set on a sound stage. He is told that Arthur Curtis is merely a character he is playing, and that his real identity is Gerald Raigan, a movie star who is caught in the aftermath of a brutal divorce from his hostile ex-wife Nora, his own alcoholism and a declining career. Apparently his behavior has been deteriorating for some time and the studio is fed up with him, thinking that he is simply faking mental illness to avoid his responsibilities. The director warns Raigan/Curtis that he will likely be fired if he leaves, but Raigan/Curtis ignores him and departs the studio to go home. Outside, he is nearly hit by a car driven by Nora, who demands the money awarded her from their divorce settlement, though Raigan/Curtis insists he doesn't know who Nora is. They leave together in the car.

Raigan/Curtis tries in vain to locate Arthur Curtis's house, and mistakes a little girl for his daughter and grabs her — causing her to flee in terror. Nora drives him to their supposed real home. Inside, he meets Brinkley, his (Raigan's) agent, who tells him that if he fails to continue work that day, he will drop him as a client. Curtis still protests that he is not Raigan, and tries to call his workplace, but the operator cannot find any listing of it. Brinkley believes that he is having a nervous breakdown, and shows him the shooting script of a movie called The Private World of Arthur Curtis. He then tells Raigan/Curtis that the movie is being canceled due to his current outburst and his ongoing issues.

Raigan/Curtis rushes back to the set, which is being dismantled, and pleads not to be left in the miserable world of Gerald Raigan. His office miraculously reappears as it was before, just as Marian arrives. Sally gives him his plane tickets. As Raigan/Curtis hears echoes of the workers dismantling the studio, he embraces Marian and desperately tells her that he never wants to lose her; and that they should leave for their vacation immediately. They then quickly exit his office and head to the airport. Meanwhile, in the other world, Brinkley shows up on the set to find that Raigan has vanished. Some of the crew saw him return to the set, but no one saw him leave. Perplexed, Brinkley wonders where Raigan might have gone. As the set is taken apart, the Arthur Curtis script lies amidst a cluttered desk, waiting to be thrown away. An airplane is seen, having just taken off and vanishing into thin air, hinting that Raigan/Curtis escaped into the world he wanted.

== Closing narration ==
The modus operandi for the departure from life is usually a pine box of such and such dimensions, and this is the ultimate in reality. But there are other ways for a man to exit from life. Take the case of Arthur Curtis, age thirty-six. His departure was along a highway with an exit sign that reads, "This Way To Escape". Arthur Curtis, en route to the Twilight Zone.
