= A Hundred Yards Over the Rim =

- The Twilight Zone episode
- Episode no.: Season 2 Episode 23
- Directed by: Buzz Kulik
- Written by: Rod Serling
- Production code: 173-3654
- Original air date: April 7, 1961

Guest appearances
- Cliff Robertson as Chris Horn; John Crawford as Joe; Miranda Jones as Martha Horn; Evans Evans as Mary Lou; John Astin as Charlie; Edward Platt as Doctor

Episode chronology
← Previous "Long Distance Call"	Next → "The Rip Van Winkle Caper"
- The Twilight Zone (1959 TV series, season 2)

"A Hundred Yards Over the Rim" is episode 59 of the American television anthology series The Twilight Zone, and is the 23rd episode of the second season. It originally aired on April 7, 1961, on CBS. The episode was written by series creator and showrunner Rod Serling. It was directed by filmmaker Buzz Kulik. This was the first of two appearances on The Twilight Zone by Cliff Robertson, the second being in the 1962 episode "The Dummy".

== Opening narration ==
The year is 1847, the place is the territory of New Mexico, the people are a tiny handful of men and women with a dream. Eleven months ago, they started out from Ohio and headed west. Someone told them about a place called California, about a warm sun and a blue sky, about rich land and fresh air, and at this moment, almost a year later, they've seen nothing but cold, heat, exhaustion, hunger, and sickness. This man's name is Christian Horn. He has a dying eight-year-old son and a heartsick wife, and he's the only one remaining who has even a fragment of the dream left. Mr. Chris Horn, who's going over the top of a rim to look for water and sustenance and in a moment will move into the Twilight Zone.

== Plot ==
In the year 1847, Chris Horn is the leader of a small wagon train from Ohio attempting to reach California. Horn's wife and young son Christian are riding in one of the group's covered wagons. Christian is dangerously ill and the others advise Horn they wish to turn back, as they are running out of supplies and lack medicine for the sick. Determined to keep going, Horn sets off alone to a nearby hill, in a desperate search for water and sustenance.

Upon crossing over the rim, Horn suddenly finds himself in 1961 New Mexico and is perplexed to see telephone poles, a hard black road, and a large, fast-moving truck coming at him. He stumbles out of the way, accidentally firing his rifle and grazing his arm. He comes to a small café and gas station, owned by Joe and Mary Lou. Joe gives Horn water while Mary Lou tends to his injury, offering him penicillin, which she explains will ward off infection. They ask where he is from, curious about his old-fashioned clothes and antique-yet-seemingly-new rifle. However, they do not believe his story, and consider him mentally unstable.

Joe calls a local doctor to come check on Horn. The doctor finds him fit and seemingly rational, with only the implausibility of the man's story giving him reason to think otherwise, and calls the local sheriff. Meanwhile, Horn has found an encyclopedia containing a brief biographical entry for "Horn, Christian Jr., M.D.", who did great work with children's diseases in late 19th-century California. Horn concludes that this is his son, and believes that he has been brought to this place to save him. Taking the penicillin with him, he leaves and runs back toward the rim.

The arriving sheriff and Joe pursue Horn, who stumbles and drops his rifle before scrambling back over the rim. He sees the wagon train where he had left it, then looks back over the rim to find the territory unsettled. After giving his son a dose of penicillin, Horn leads the party onward to a fresh water spring that Joe had mentioned and California. Concurrently, Joe and the sheriff have returned to the café. Joe tells Mary Lou that Horn simply vanished and all they found was Horn's rifle on the ground where he dropped it. Looking at it, they see that it now shows the effects of more than 100 years of exposure.

== Closing narration ==
Mr. Christian Horn, one of the hearty breed of men who headed west during a time when there were no concrete highways or the solace of civilization. Mr. Christian Horn, family and party, heading west, after a brief detour to The Twilight Zone.

== Production ==
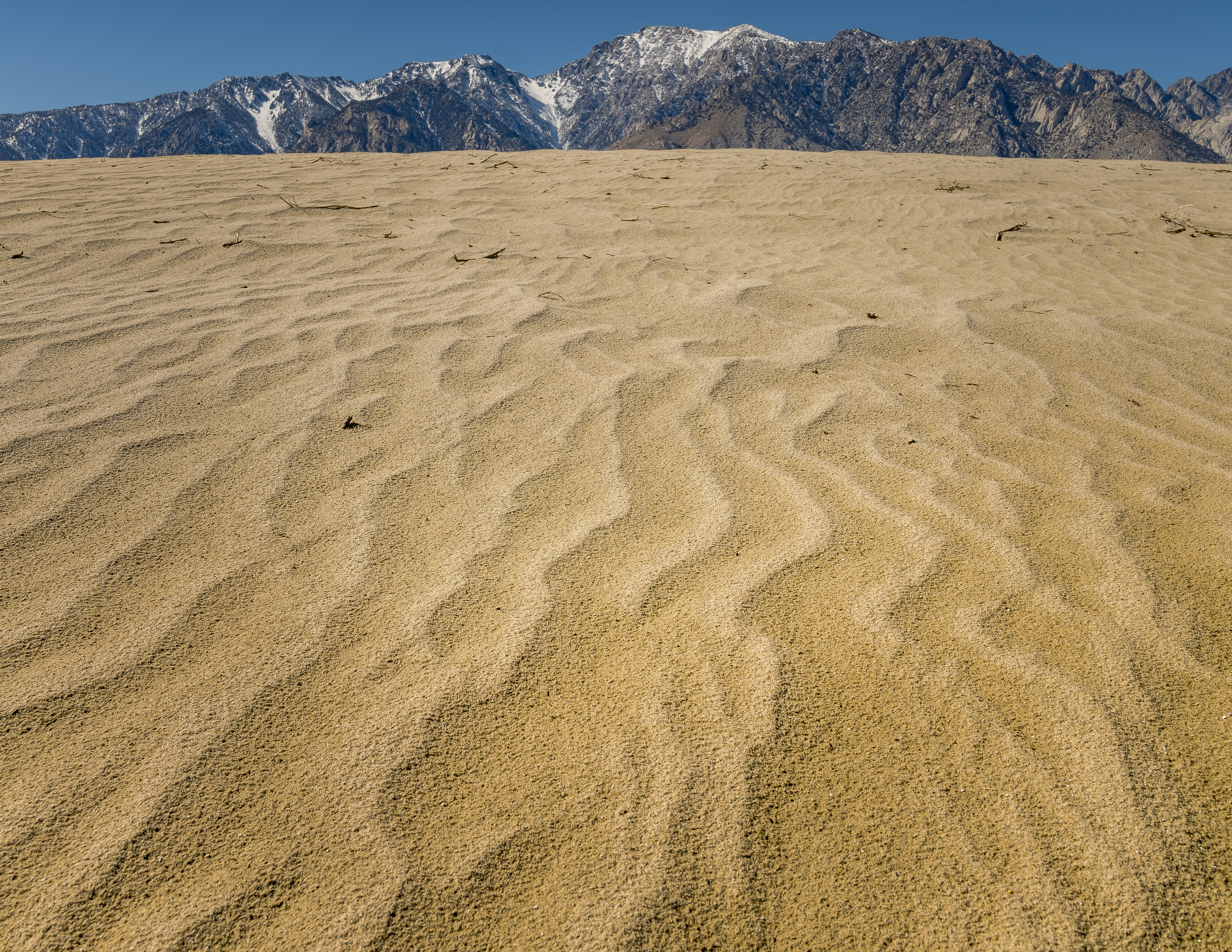
Olancha Dunes

The location shooting for the scenes of the wagon train in the sand dunes and the exterior of the roadside diner was carried out at Olancha, California in the Owens Valley, located on U.S. Route 395, approximately 300 km (190 miles) north of Los Angeles, adjacent to the Sierra Nevada mountains. This is one of two Twilight Zone episodes filmed at this locale, the other being "Third from the Sun" (1960). The distinctive geography of the Olancha area was also used for location shooting for the feature films Tremors (1990), Bug (2006), and Iron Man (2008).

Cliff Robertson, having done research, picked the outfit for himself especially as he felt that it would have been accurate to what someone from Ohio would have worn in the 1800s, despite it being highly uncomfortable. Buzz Kulik disapproved of the outfit and they had an argument that was only settled in Robertson's favor when they called up Rod Serling. After filming, the crew agreed that Robertson made the right call.
