= You Drive =

- The Twilight Zone episode
- Episode no.: Season 5 Episode 14
- Directed by: John Brahm
- Written by: Earl Hamner Jr.
- Production code: 2625
- Original air date: January 3, 1964

Guest appearances
- Edward Andrews as Oliver Pope; Helen Westcott as Lilian Pope; Kevin Hagen as Pete Radcliff; Totty Ames as Muriel Hastings

Episode chronology
← Previous "Ring-a-Ding Girl"	Next → "The Long Morrow"
- The Twilight Zone (1959 TV series) (season 5)

"You Drive" is episode 134 of the American television anthology series The Twilight Zone. It originally aired on January 3, 1964, on CBS. In this episode, the perpetrator of a fatal hit-and-run is hounded by the car he committed the crime with. Earl Hamner Jr. reprised this story, as he had already used it in the 1954 TV series 'Justice'.

== Opening narration ==
The narration begins with Oliver Pope driving.

Portrait of a nervous man: Oliver Pope by name, office manager by profession. A man beset by life's problems: his job, his salary, the competition to get ahead. Obviously, Mr. Pope's mind is not on his driving.

The narration continues after Pope commits the hit-and run:

Oliver Pope, businessman-turned-killer, on a rain-soaked street in the early evening of just another day during just another drive home from the office. The victim, a kid on a bicycle, lying injured, near death. But Mr. Pope hasn't time for the victim, his only concern is for himself. Oliver Pope, hit-and-run driver, just arrived at a crossroad in his life, and he's chosen the wrong turn. The hit occurred in the world he knows, but the run will lead him straight into - the Twilight Zone.

== Plot ==
Oliver "Ollie" Pope is a nervous and distracted office manager. While driving home, he slams his 1956 Ford Fairlane Club Sedan into Timmy Danvers, a boy delivering newspapers on his bicycle, mortally injuring him. Pope stops to offer aid, but changes his mind and hurries off to conceal his part in the accident but not before Muriel Hastings, a witness nearby, tries to stop him. Timmy later dies of his injuries. Pope's wife Lillian and his co-workers notice that he is becoming increasingly irritable. A co-worker named Pete Radcliff is mistakenly identified as the perpetrator by Hastings while the authorities stake out the scene of the crime. Pope does nothing to correct the error, having previously told his wife of his suspicion that Radcliff was trying to steal his job.

Before long, Pope's Fairlane seems to take on a mind of its own, rebelling against its owner. At first, when he is near the car, it honks its horn, flashes its lights, attempts to start on its own, drops its bumper, tries to close its hood on him, and repeats the radio newsflash of the boy's death in an attempt to get his attention. Then, while his wife is driving the Fairlane, it drives to the scene of the accident and stalls out, seemingly determined to get Pope to admit his guilt. He makes excuses to his wife and continues trying to cover up his crime.

Pope starts walking to work in an effort to avoid his car to lower the risk of being exposed to the authorities. One day, as he heads out into the rain, the Fairlane leaves the garage on its own and chases him relentlessly down the street. Pope falls, but the car stops just before running him down. The passenger door opens and Pope gets in. The Fairlane drives him to a police station, where Pope gets out and walks in to confess.

== Closing narration ==
All persons attempting to conceal criminal acts involving their cars are hereby warned: check first to see that underneath that chrome there does not lie a conscience, especially if you're driving along a rain-soaked highway in the Twilight Zone.

== Cast ==
- Edward Andrews as Oliver Pope
- Helen Westcott as Lillian Pope
- Kevin Hagen as Pete Radcliff
- Totty Ames as Muriel Hastings
- Michael Gorfain as Timmy Danvers

== Production notes ==
External shots (involving the car) of Pope's home and the park were filmed in a neighborhood in Culver City, California. The house that served as Pope's home still stands at 4183 Keystone Avenue (the address appears on an exterior shot in the episode) and the nearby park where the accident took place is the Dr. Paul Carlson Memorial Park. It is located a few blocks from the Sony Pictures (formerly MGM) lot. The scenes where Pope is chased by his car were filmed on Jasmine Avenue. The home at 4262 (as shown in the episode) has since been replaced. However, the adjoining yard that he runs through (and house) are still there and readily identifiable.

== Sources ==
- DeVoe, Bill. (2008). Trivia from The Twilight Zone. Albany, GA: Bear Manor Media. ISBN 978-1-59393-136-0
- Grams, Martin. (2008). The Twilight Zone: Unlocking the Door to a Television Classic. Churchville, MD: OTR Publishing. ISBN 978-0-9703310-9-0
