= One More Pallbearer =

- The Twilight Zone episode
- Episode no.: Season 3 Episode 17
- Directed by: Lamont Johnson
- Written by: Rod Serling
- Production code: 4823
- Original air date: January 12, 1962

Guest appearances
- Joseph Wiseman; Gage Clarke; Katherine Squire; Trevor Bardette

Episode chronology
← Previous "Nothing in the Dark"	Next → "Dead Man's Shoes"
- The Twilight Zone (1959 TV series) (season 3)

"One More Pallbearer" is episode 82 of the American television anthology series The Twilight Zone, and was the 17th episode of the third season. The episode originally aired on January 12, 1962, was written by series creator/showrunner Rod Serling with a cast featuring Joseph Wiseman, Katherine Squire, Trevor Bardette and Gage Clarke.

== Opening narration ==
What you have just looked at takes place three hundred feet underground, beneath the basement of a New York City skyscraper. It's owned and lived in by one Paul Radin. Mr. Radin is rich, eccentric and single-minded. How rich we can already perceive; how eccentric and single-minded we shall see in a moment, because all of you have just entered the Twilight Zone.

== Plot ==
Millionaire Paul Radin invites three people to the bomb shelter that he has built. He greets them politely but without genuine warmth as he holds a personal grudge against each of them. One is high-school teacher Mrs. Langsford, who gave him a failing grade when he was caught cheating on a test and attempting to frame another student; the second is Colonel Hawthorne, who had him court-martialed when Radin endangered lives by disobeying orders; and the third is Reverend Hughes, who made a public scandal out of a young woman who later committed suicide over Radin.

Radin, with the aid of sound effects and fake radio messages, convinces the trio that an apocalyptic nuclear war will occur in just moments. He offers them refuge in the shelter if they do one thing: apologize for their actions. All three refuse his offer, valuing their honor above their lives and preferring to spend the last few moments with their loved ones or alone than to live with Radin.

Radin, unable to believe that, opens the way out and pursues them to the elevator. Mrs. Langsford, still believing Radin will survive but be left alone, tells him to try to cope by surrounding himself with mirrors. She tells him that he has spent his life deluding himself about his own character and what is right and wrong: "It's a fantasy, and now you can have it all to yourself." As the elevator leaves, Radin shouts that this is not true.

The sound of a bomb detonation and footage of nuclear disaster fills the screen in Radin's shelter. He takes the elevator to the surface and emerges to see the world devastated and in ruin. But it is revealed that Radin, devastated by his hoax's failure, has lost his mind and is only imagining the destruction. Radin sobs helplessly at the foot of a fountain outside his intact building while a police officer tries to aid him.

== Closing narration ==
Mr. Paul Radin, a dealer in fantasy, who sits in the rubble of his own making and imagines that he's the last man on Earth, doomed to a perdition of unutterable loneliness because a practical joke has turned into a nightmare. Mr. Paul Radin, pallbearer at a funeral that he manufactured himself in the Twilight Zone.

== Cast ==
- Joseph Wiseman as Paul Radin
- Katherine Squire as Mrs. Langsford
- Trevor Bardette as Col. Hawthorne
- Gage Clarke as Rev. Hughes
