= The Bewitchin' Pool =

- The Twilight Zone episode
- Episode no.: Season 5 Episode 36
- Directed by: Joseph M. Newman
- Written by: Earl Hamner Jr.
- Production code: 2619
- Original air date: June 19, 1964

Guest appearances
- Mary Badham as Sport Sharewood; June Foray as Sport Sharewood (voice, outdoor scenes); Kim Hector as Whitt; Dee Hartford as Gloria Sharewood; Jeffrey Byron as Jeb Sharewood; Georgia Simmons as Aunt T; Tod Andrews as Gil Sharewood

Episode chronology
← Previous "The Fear"	Next → —
- The Twilight Zone (1959 TV series) (season 5)

"The Bewitchin' Pool" is the 156th and last episode of the first incarnation of the American anthology television series The Twilight Zone ("Come Wander with Me", however, was the final episode to be filmed). It originally aired on June 19, 1964 on CBS.

== Opening narration ==
Right before the end of the introduction, as in a typical episode, Rod Serling appears on-screen and says:

A swimming pool not unlike any other pool, a structure built of tile and cement and money, a backyard toy for the affluent, wet entertainment for the well-to-do. But to Jeb and Sport Sharewood, this pool holds mysteries not dreamed of by the building contractor, not guaranteed in any sales brochure. For this pool has a secret exit that leads to a never-neverland, a place designed for junior citizens who need a long voyage away from reality, into the bottomless regions of the Twilight Zone.

After the opening credits are finished rolling, Serling, in voice-over, says:

Introduction to a perfect setting: Colonial mansion, spacious grounds, heated swimming pool. All the luxuries money can buy. Introduction to two children: brother and sister, names Jeb and Sport. Healthy, happy, normal youngsters. Introduction to a mother: Gloria Sharewood by name, glamorous by nature. Introduction to a father: Gil Sharewood, handsome, prosperous, the picture of success. A man who has achieved every man's ambition. Beautiful children, beautiful home, beautiful wife. Idyllic? Obviously. But don't look too carefully, don't peek behind the façade. The idyll may have feet of clay.

== Plot ==
Sport Sharewood and her younger brother Jeb live in a large, expensive house, but their parents are cold, ill-tempered, self-centered, and constantly bickering with each other.

While Sport and Jeb are sitting beside their swimming pool, Whitt, a young boy in a straw hat, pops up from the deep end of the pool and invites them to follow him. The children dive underwater only to come back up in a swimming hole bordering a rustic, simple homestead, with an assortment of children playing in the yard. In contrast to their lavish home of neglect and insults, they are welcomed and loved from the moment they arrive at this humble children's paradise. There is only one adult there, "Aunt T", a kind and patient elderly woman who loves children. She explains that she has many children there who came from parents who did not deserve them.

Sport and Jeb go home, for fear that their parents will be worried. "Aunt T" advises them that they likely will not be able to return as few children can find their way back. But Jeb later returns to Aunt T's, and Sport is sent by her mother to go and find him because she has something to tell them about some decisions that are made that will make all their lives better. Sport finds Jeb at Aunt T's but he refuses to go back. Sport convinces him by telling him that their mother has promised everything will be better; he reluctantly agrees to return with her. Back home, their parents inform them they are planning to divorce and they must decide which parent they will live with. The children refuse and run back outside and dive back into the pool; when they do not reemerge, their father jumps in to rescue them, but discovers they have disappeared.

Sport and Jeb are able to escape and are now happily living with Aunt T. Sport hears the distant voice of her mother but ignores it and focuses on her new life.

== Closing narration ==
A brief epilogue for concerned parents. Of course, there isn't any such place as the gingerbread house of Aunt T, and we grownups know there's no door at the bottom of a swimming pool that leads to a secret place. But who can say how real the fantasy world of lonely children can become? For Jeb and Sport Sharewood, the need for love turned fantasy into reality; they found a secret place—in the Twilight Zone.

== Cast ==
- Mary Badham as Sport Sharewood
- June Foray as dubbed voice of Sport Sharewood, in outdoor scenes only
- Jeffrey Byron (as Tim Stafford) as Jeb Sharewood
- Kim Hector as Whitt
- Georgia Simmons as Aunt T
- Dee Hartford as Mrs. Gloria Sharewood
- Tod Andrews as Mr. Gil Sharewood

== Episode notes ==
This was the final original episode of the original Twilight Zone series to be broadcast, though not the last to be filmed.

Numerous production problems delayed the premiere of this episode, which was originally scheduled for March 20, 1964. Back-lot noise rendered much of the outdoor dialogue unusable – only the indoor scenes with Aunt T were considered audible. The entire cast (except Aunt T) consequently re-dubbed their outdoor dialogue in September 1963, but Mary Badham's voice was still deemed not right. Unfortunately, by the time this decision had been made, Badham had returned to her home in Alabama, and the cost of flying her back to Los Angeles to re-record her lines yet again was ruled to be too expensive. Eventually, voice actress June Foray (the voice of Rocky the Flying Squirrel in the Bullwinkle cartoons), who had voiced Talky Tina in the episode "Living Doll" earlier in the season, dubbed Sport Sharewood's lines for all the scenes that take place outdoors.

Another production peculiarity is that "The Bewitchin' Pool'" is the only episode of The Twilight Zone to open with a teaser scene that is repeated in its entirety later in the episode. This opening teaser scene (which is well over two minutes in length) was not included in Earl Hamner's original episode script; it appears to have been included to lengthen the episode after some other footage was dropped.

Earl Hamner, Jr., got the idea for "The Bewitchin' Pool" while living in the San Fernando Valley region of California and witnessing a high divorce rate and its possible effects on children.

== Bibliography ==
- DeVoe, Bill. (2008). Trivia from The Twilight Zone. Albany, GA: Bear Manor Media. ISBN 978-1-59393-136-0
- Grams, Martin. (2008). The Twilight Zone: Unlocking the Door to a Television Classic. Churchville, MD: OTR Publishing. ISBN 978-0-9703310-9-0
- Presnell, Don and Marty McGee. (2008). A Critical History of Television’s The Twilight Zone, 1959–1964. Jefferson, NC: McFarland. ISBN 978-0-7864-3886-0
