= Night Call (The Twilight Zone) =

- The Twilight Zone episode
- Episode no.: Season 5 Episode 19
- Directed by: Jacques Tourneur
- Written by: Richard Matheson
- Based on: "Long Distance Call" (AKA "Sorry, Right Number") by Richard Matheson
- Production code: 2610
- Original air date: February 7, 1964

Guest appearances
- Gladys Cooper: Elva Keene; Nora Marlowe: Margaret Phillips; Martine Bartlett: Miss Finch

Episode chronology
← Previous "Black Leather Jackets"	Next → "From Agnes—With Love"
- The Twilight Zone (1959 TV series) (season 5)

"Night Call" is a 1964 episode of the American television anthology series The Twilight Zone directed by Jacques Tourneur. The story follows an elderly woman, played by Gladys Cooper, who receives persistent disturbing phone calls from an anonymous caller. The episode is based on Richard Matheson's short story "Sorry, Right Number" which appeared in the November 1953 issue of Beyond Fantasy Fiction. The title was changed to "Long Distance Call" when the story was anthologized. The story ends differently than the TV episode.

== Opening narration ==
Miss Elva Keene lives alone on the outskirts of London Flats, a tiny rural community in Maine. Up until now, the pattern of Miss Keene's existence has been that of lying in her bed or sitting in her wheelchair, reading books, listening to a radio, eating, napping, taking medication—and waiting for something different to happen. Miss Keene doesn't know it yet, but her period of waiting has just ended, for something different is about to happen to her, has in fact already begun to happen, via two most unaccountable telephone calls in the middle of a stormy night, telephone calls routed directly through—the Twilight Zone.

== Plot ==
An elderly paraplegic woman, Elva Keene, receives strange anonymous phone calls in the middle of a stormy night. During the first calls she hears only static. Later she hears a man moaning and she repeatedly demands to know who is calling. The man continues to call and keeps repeating "Hello?" over and over. Finally he says, "Hello? Where are you? I want to talk to you." Elva, terrified, screams at the man to leave her alone.

Elva calls a phone company, who traces the calls to a telephone line that has fallen in a cemetery. Elva and her housekeeper visit the cemetery where she finds that the line is resting on the grave of her long-deceased fiancé, Brian Douglas. Elva says that she always insisted on having her own way, and Brian always did what she said. Brian died in 1932 a week before they were to be married. That day, she insisted on driving, lost control of the car and hit a tree. The accident killed Brian and rendered her paraplegic.

Now that she can talk to him again, she realizes she won't have to be alone. At home, she picks up the phone and calls to Brian's ghost, pleading with him to answer. He replies that she told him to leave her alone and that he always does what she says. The line goes dead, leaving Elva alone and crying in her bed.

== Closing narration ==
According to the Bible, God created the Heavens and the Earth. It is man's prerogative—and woman's—to create their own particular and private Hell. Case in point, Miss Elva Keene, who in every sense has made her own bed and now must lie in it, sadder, but wiser, by dint of a rather painful lesson in responsibility, transmitted from the Twilight Zone.

== Notes ==
The caller is never identified in the original short story. The night after she finds out the voice is coming from the cemetery, she receives a call in which the voice says: "Hello, Mrs. Keene. I'll be right over." The short story creates a heightened level of horror because the unknown speaker on the phone gradually improves in cognition and speech to the point where they seek to interact with her physically, conjuring up images of the walking dead and reanimated corpses.

The original anthologized short story title, "Long Distance Call", was changed to "Night Call" because there had already been an episode of The Twilight Zone in 1961 with that title.

The premiere of "Night Call" was scheduled for Friday, November 22, 1963. Hours before it was to air, however, President John F. Kennedy was assassinated in Dallas, Texas. It was rescheduled, as were all of the other network shows. "Night Call" finally premiered on February 7, 1964.
