= Bess Armstrong =

American actress (born 1953)

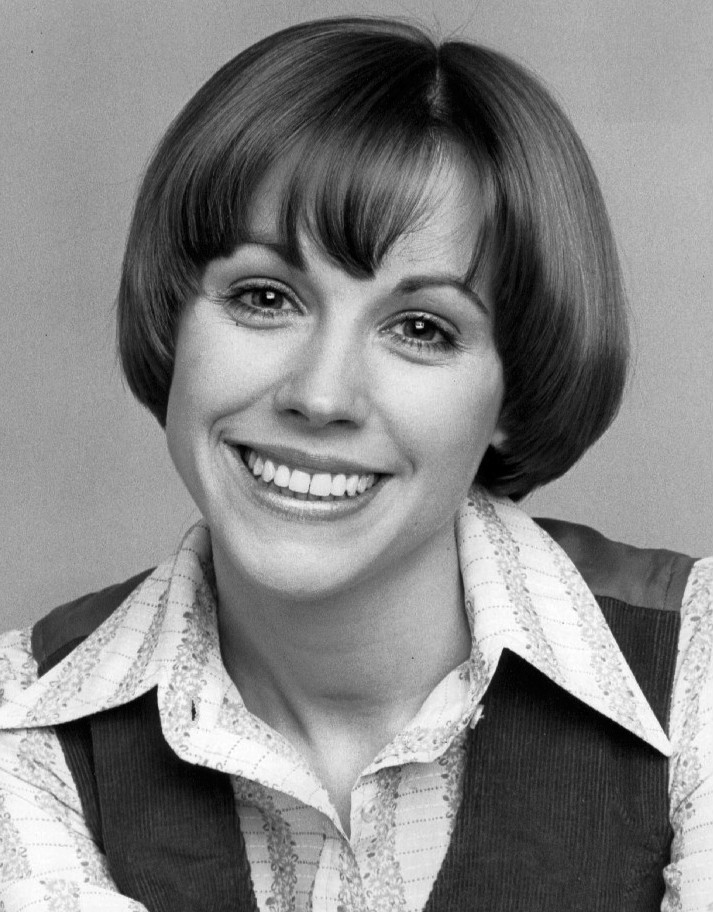
- Armstrong in On Our Own publicity photo, 1977
- Born: Elizabeth Key Armstrong; December 11, 1953 (age 72); Baltimore, Maryland, U.S.
- Education: Brown University (BA)
- Occupation: Actress
- Years active: 1975–present
- Known for: Jaws 3-D; The Four Seasons; High Road to China; Nothing in Common; My So-Called Life; On Our Own
- Spouses: Chris Carreras (m. 1983; div. 1984) John Fiedler (m. 1986)
- Children: 3
- Relatives: Alexander Armstrong (grandfather)

Elizabeth Key "Bess" Armstrong (born December 11, 1953) is an American actress. She is known for her roles in the films The Four Seasons (1981), High Road to China (1983), Jaws 3-D (1983), and Nothing in Common (1986). Armstrong also starred in the ABC drama series My So-Called Life and had lead roles in a number of made-for-television films.

== Early life ==
Elizabeth Key Armstrong was born on December 11, 1953, in Baltimore, Maryland, the daughter of Louise Allen (née Parlange), who taught at Bryn Mawr, and Alexander Armstrong, an English teacher at the Gilman School. Her grandfather was Alexander Armstrong, Attorney General of Maryland. She graduated from Brown University with a BA degree in 1975.

== Career ==
Armstrong's professional acting career began in 1975 with the Off-Off Broadway debut, Harmony House. Then, in 1977, Armstrong made her television debut as Julia Peters on the CBS sitcom, On Our Own. In 1978 Armstrong starred opposite Richard Thomas in her first TV-movie, Getting Married. Also in 1978, she starred in the TV movie "How to Pick Up Girls!" with Desi Arnaz Jr. She co-starred again with Richard Thomas in a 1981 stage production in Seattle of Neil Simon's Barefoot in the Park, from which a video was made for HBO broadcast that year.

Armstrong continued to make several films for both the big and small screens in the 1980s, among them High Road to China opposite Tom Selleck; Jaws 3-D with Dennis Quaid; Alan Alda's The Four Seasons; the TV miniseries Lace; and Nothing in Common, starring Tom Hanks and Jackie Gleason.

The 1990s brought Armstrong to her best-known role, playing Patty Chase on the series My So-Called Life. She later starred in several television films. In 2000, she appeared on the NBC sitcom Frasier, in the episode "Mary Christmas." In 2008, Armstrong played Penelope Kendall on ABC's Boston Legal. Armstrong remains active in films, television, and the stage. She had a recurring role in the Showtime series House of Lies as Julianne Hotschragar. She also appeared in Castle, Mad Men, NCIS, S.W.A.T., and Grey's Anatomy.

== Personal life ==
Armstrong married John Fiedler, an executive at Columbia Pictures, on April 12, 1986.

In July 1986, Armstrong gave birth to a daughter with an underdeveloped brain. Her daughter lived for five and a half months. In 1991, Armstrong shared the experience in The Choices We Made: Twenty-Five Women and Men Speak Out About Abortion.

== Filmography ==
=== Film ===
Year	Title	Role	Director(s)	Notes
1981	The Four Seasons	Ginny Newley	Alan Alda	Romantic comedy-drama film
1981	The House of God	Cissy Anderson	Donald Wrye	Comedy-drama film Never released theatrically
1982	Jekyll and Hyde... Together Again	Mary Carew	Jerry Belson	Sex comedy film Based on Strange Case of Dr. Jekyll and Mr. Hyde by Robert Louis Stevenson
1983	High Road to China	Eve	Brian G. Hutton	Adventure-romantic film Loosely based on the 1977 novel of the same name by Jon Cleary; Nominated — Saturn Award for Best Actress
1983	Jaws 3-D	Dr. Kathryn 'Kay' Morgan	Joe Alves	Horror film
1986	Nothing in Common	Donna Mildred Martin	Garry Marshall	Comedy-drama film
1989	Mother, Mother	Kate Watson	Micki Dickoff	Short film
1989	Second Sight	Kate / Sister Elizabeth	Joel Zwick	Science fiction black comedy film
1993	Dream Lover	Elaine	Nicholas Kazan	Erotic thriller film
1993	The Skateboard Kid	Maggie	Larry Swerdlove	Family comedy film
1994	Serial Mom	Eugene Sutphin's Nurse	John Waters	Satirical black comedy crime film Cameo
1997	That Darn Cat!	Judy Randall	Bob Spiers	Mystery crime film Based on Undercover Cat by Gordon Gordon & Mildred Gordon; Remake of the original film
1998	Pecker	Dr. Klompus	John Waters	Satirical comedy film
1998	When It Clicks	Betsy Cummings	Joanna Cappuccilli Lovetti	Short film
2000	Diamond Men	Katie Harnish	Dan Cohen	Crime drama film
2008	Corporate Affairs	Emily Parker	Dan Cohen	Comedy film
2008	Next of Kin	Susan	Martha M. Elcan	Drama film

=== Television ===
Year	Title	Role	Notes
1977–78	On Our Own	Julia Peters	Main cast
1978	The Love Boat	Laura Stanton	Episode: "The Man Who Loved Women/A Different Girl/Oh, My Aching Brother"
1978	Getting Married	Kristine Lawrence	TV movie
1978	How to Pick Up Girls!	Sally Claybrook	TV movie
1979	Walking Through the Fire	Laurel Lee	TV movie
1979	11th Victim	Jill Kelso	TV movie
1983	This Girl for Hire	B.T. Brady	TV movie
1984	Lace	Judy Hale	Miniseries
1986	All Is Forgiven	Paula Winters Russell	Main cast
1990–91	Married People	Elizabeth Meyers	Main cast
1992	Tales from the Crypt	Erma	Episode: "What's Cookin"
1993	Batman: The Animated Series	Clio (voice)	Episode: "Fire from Olympus"
1994–95	My So-Called Life	Patty Chase	Main cast
1994	Take Me Home Again	Connie	TV movie
1995	She Stood Alone: The Tailhook Scandal	Barbara Pope	TV movie
1995	Stolen Innocence	Becky Sapp	TV movie
1995	Mixed Blessings	Pilar Graham Coleman	TV movie
1996	Forgotten Sins	Roberta 'Bobbie' Bradshaw	TV movie
1996	The Perfect Daughter	Jill Michaelson	TV movie
1996	She Cried No	Denise Connell	TV movie
1996	Christmas Every Day	Molly Jackson	TV movie
1998	Touched by an Angel	Mary Gibson	Episode: "How Do You Spell Faith?"
1998	Forever Love	Gail	TV movie
1994, 1998	The Nanny	Sarah Sheffield	Episodes: "I Don't Remember Mama" and "The Wedding"
2000, 2004	Frasier	Kelly Kirkland	Episodes: "Mary Christmas" and "Frasier-Lite"
2002	That Was Then	Mickey Glass	Main cast
2002	Her Best Friend's Husband	Mandy Roberts	TV movie
2002	Good Morning, Miami	Louise Messinger	Episode: "If It's Not One Thing, It's a Mother"
2004, 2010	One Tree Hill	Lydia James	Recurring role (season 2, season 7)
2008	Boston Legal	Penelope Kimball	Episodes: "Mad About You" and "Made in China"
2009	Criminal Minds	Sheila Hawkes	Episode: "Zoe's Reprise"
2010	Castle	Paula Casillas	Episode: "He's Dead, She's Dead"
2012	CSI: Crime Scene Investigation	Patricia Lydecker	Episode: "CSI Unplugged"
2012	I Married Who?	Elaine	TV movie
2012	Mad Men	Catherine Orcutt	Episode: "Far Away Places"
2013	Reckless	Catherine Harrison	1 episode (TV pilot)
2013–14	House of Lies	Julianne Hotschragar	Recurring role (season 2)
2014	True Blood	Nancy Mills	Episode: "Lost Cause"
2014	Drop Dead Diva	Rita Kaswell	Episode: "Hope and Glory"
2014	NCIS	Senator Denise O'Hara	Episode: "Dressed to Kill"
2014	Reckless	Melinda Rayder	Recurring role
2015–16	Zoo	Dr. Elizabeth Oz	Episodes: "Fight or Flight" and "Jamie's Got a Gun"
2015–17	Switched at Birth	Professor Beth Marillo	7 episodes
2016	Diagnosis Delicious	Lynn Cosworth	TV movie
2016	Damien	Damien's Mother	Episode: "Temptress"
2016	Longmire	Nancy Crandall	Episode: "From This Day Forward"
2016	Conviction	Harper Morrison	Episode: The pilot, "Bridge And Tunnel Vision"
2017	Scandal	Senator Greenwald	Episode: “Watch Me”
2018	The Arrangement	Iris Holloway	Episodes: "The Break Up" and "Suite Revenge"
2018–19	S.W.A.T.	Mayor Barrett	3 episodes
2019	Love and Sunshine	Margo Terry	TV movie
2019–25	Grey's Anatomy	Maureen Lincoln	4 episodes
2019–21	Bosch	Judge Sobel	Recurring role (seasons 5–7)
2022	I Love That for You	Marcy Gold	Recurring role
2024	The Good Doctor	Eileen Lim	Recurring role
2025	The Irrational	Renee Franklin	Episode "Straight from the Heart"
