= 18th Writers Guild of America Awards =

18th WGA Awards
- Date: March 23, 1966
- Organized by: Writers Guild of America, East and the Writers Guild of America, West

The 18th Writers Guild of America Awards honored the best film writers and television writers of 1965. Winners were announced in 1966.

== Winners and nominees ==
=== Film ===
Winners are listed first highlighted in boldface.

**Best Written Musical**: **The Sound of Music, Screenplay by Ernest Lehamn; Based on the stage musical book by Howard Lindsay and Russel Crouse**	**Best Written American Drama**: **The Pawnbroker, Screenplay by Morton S. Fine and David Friedkin; Based on the novel by Edward Lewis Wallant**; A Patch of Blue, Screenplay by Guy Green; Based on the novel Be Ready with Bells and Drums by Elizabeth Kata; The Spy Who Came in from the Cold, Screenplay by Paul Dehn and Guy Trosper; Based on the novel by John le Carré; The Collector, Screenplay by Stanley Mann and John Kohn; Based on the novel by John Fowles; Ship of Fools, Screenplay by Abby Mann; Based on the novel by Katherine Anne Porter
**Best Written American Comedy**: **A Thousand Clowns, Screenplay by Herb Gardner**; Cat Ballou, Screenplay by Walter Newman and Frank Pierson; Based on the novel by Roy Chanslor; That Darn Cat!, Screenplay by Mildred Gordon, Gordon Gordon and Bill Walsh; Based on the novel Undercover Cat by The Gordons; The Great Race, Screenplay by Arthur A. Ross; Story by Blake Edwards and Arthur A. Ross; What's New Pussycat, Written by Woody Allen	

=== Television ===
**Episodic Comedy**: **"Br-room, Br-room" – The Dick Van Dyke Show (CBS) – Dale McRaven and Carl Kleinschmitt**; "Dash Riprock, You Cad" – The Beverly Hillbillies (ABC) – Paul Henning and Mark Tuttle; "4½" – The Dick Van Dyke Show (CBS) – Gary Marshall and Jerry Belson; "Romances, Roses, and Rye Bread" – The Dick Van Dyke Show (CBS) – Gary Marshall and Jerry Belson; "Maybe Love Will Save My Apartment House" – Dr. Kildare (NBC) – Boris Solbelman	**Episodic Drama**: **"With a Hammer in His Hand, Lord, Lord!" – Mr. Novak (NBC) – John D.F. Black**; "Interlude" – 12 O'Clock High (ABC) – Dean Riesner; "A Woods Full of Question Marks" – Ben Casey (ABC) – Ellis Marcus; "Man is a Rock" – Dr. Kildare (NBC) – Christopher Knopf; "Men in a Chariot" – The Fugitive (ABC) – George Eckstein; "Did He Who Made the Lamb Make Thee?" – Slattery's People (CBS) – William P. McGivern
**Anthology, Any Length**: **"Demon with a Glass Hand" – The Outer Limits (ABC) – Harlan Ellison**; "Cops and Robbers" – Bob Hope Presents the Chrysler Theatre (NBC) – Eric Bercovici and Jud Taylor; "Rapture at Two-Forty" – Kraft Suspense Theatre (NBC) – Luther Davis and Jo Swerling Jr.; "Child Molester" – Purex Summer Specials (NBC) – John T. Dugan	

=== Special awards ===
Laurel Award for Screenwriting Achievement

**Isobel Lennart**

Valentine Davies Award

**Leonard Spigelgass**
