= Mixed Blessings =

Mixed Blessings may refer to:

- Mixed Blessings (novel), a 1993 novel by Danielle Steel
  - Mixed Blessings (film), a film based on the novel
- Mixed Blessings (British TV series), a sitcom
- Mixed Blessings (Canadian TV series)
- "Mixed Blessing" (Doctors), a 2003 television episode
- "Mixed Blessings" (The Golden Girls), a 1988 television episode
