= Experiment in Terror (soundtrack) =

Experiment in Terror: Music from the Motion Picture

Soundtrack album by Henry Mancini
- Released: 1962
- Studio: RCA Victor's Music Center of the World
- Genre: Soundtrack
- Label: RCA Victor

Experiment in Terror: Music from the Motion Picture is a soundtrack album from the 1962 movie Experiment in Terror by Blake Edwards. The music was composed and conducted by Henry Mancini. It was released in 1962 by RCA Victor (catalog no. LPM-2442)

The album entered Billboard magazine's pop album chart on June 30, 1962, reaching the No. 37 position on the chart.

AllMusic gave the album a rating of four stars. Reviewer Marcy Donelson called it an "adventurous score" and "a must for any level of Mancini collector" because "it's extra quirky and diverse", including with jazzy lounge pieces, melancholy piano, and eerie suspense passages.

== Track listing ==
Side A

1. "Fluters' Ball" [3:17]
2. "Tooty Twist" [2:10]
3. "Kelly's Tune" [3:15]
4. "Golden Gate Twist" [2:10]
5. "The Good Old Days" [2:00]
6. "Experiment In Terror (Twist)" [2:42]

Side B

1. "Experiment In Terror" [2:16]
2. "Nancy" [3:29]
3. "Down By The Wharf" [2:25]
4. "Teen-Age Hostage" [2:35]
5. "White On White" [2:06]
6. "Final Out At Candlestick Park" [2:59]
