= Single Handed (book) =

Biography of Tibor Rubin by Daniel M. Cohen

First edition (publ. Berkley Books)

Single Handed is a 2015 biographical book by Daniel M. Cohen about Holocaust survivor, Korean War hero and POW, and Medal of Honor recipient Tibor "Teddy" Rubin. As part of his research for the book, Cohen used 40 hours of recorded conversations with Rubin.

== Reception ==
AP writer Jerry Harkavy wrote that Single Handed "is a story of endurance, bravery and determination that rivals that of Louis Zamperini, the hero of Laura Hillenbrand’s Unbroken, the best-seller about a World War II aviator who survived 47 days on a life raft in the Pacific before being held captive and tortured in a Japanese prison". Jack Fischel wrote for the Jewish Book Council that "Daniel M. Cohen provides a riveting account of one of the most courageous heroes of the Korean War". He added that "Cohen describes in detail the “red-tape,” the anti-Semitism and the resistance of the army bureaucracy in thwarting Tibor from receiving the medal". In her review, Sue Brooke wrote that Single Handed is a "compelling true story of one of the most heroic men of the Korean War. At the time he served, he was not even a U. S. citizen". The Forward called the book "riveting".
