= That Darn Cat (1997 film) =

1997 American film by Bob Spiers

- Theatrical release poster
- Directed by: Bob Spiers
- Screenplay by: S. M. Alexander; L. A. Karaszewski
- Based on: Undercover Cat by The Gordons; That Darn Cat! by; The Gordons; Bill Walsh
- Produced by: Robert Simonds
- Starring: Christina Ricci; Doug E. Doug; George Dzundza; Peter Boyle; Michael McKean; Bess Armstrong
- Cinematography: Jerzy Zieliński
- Edited by: Roger Barton
- Music by: Richard Kendall Gibbs
- Production companies: Walt Disney Pictures; Robert Simonds Productions
- Distributed by: Buena Vista Pictures Distribution
- Release date: February 14, 1997
- Running time: 86 minutes
- Country: United States
- Language: English
- Box office: $18.3 million

That Darn Cat is a 1997 American mystery comedy film directed by Bob Spiers, written by Scott Alexander and Larry Karaszewski, and starring Christina Ricci and Doug E. Doug. It is a remake of the 1965 film, which in turn was based on the 1963 book Undercover Cat by Gordon and Mildred Gordon.

That Darn Cat was released on February 14, 1997.

== Plot ==
In the quiet Massachusetts town of Edgefield, a pair of bumbling kidnappers break into the house of wealthy Mr. Flint, intending to kidnap his wife and hold her for ransom. However, they mistakenly kidnap his housemaid Lizzie instead.

Patti Randall is a troubled teenage girl struggling with the mundanity of her everyday life, and the fact her parents dislike the way she behaves and dresses. Every night, Patti's cat D.C. ("Darn Cat") leaves the house at 8 and causes mischief around the neighborhood, such as teasing dogs, stealing food, and playing with a distracted old lady's birdcage. One night, D.C. walks into the kidnappers' hideout. Seizing her chance, Lizzie attempts to scratch "HELP" on her watch, but stops with the last letter incomplete (resembling a second "L") when the kidnappers' phone rings. She attaches the watch to D.C., who returns home with it.

Patti sees the watch the next morning. Knowing of the kidnapping, she deduces it was from Lizzie and was meant to say HELP; however, no one believes her, so she doctors the evidence by turning the last incomplete letter into a "P". Determined to take advantage of the exciting situation and save Lizzie, Patti goes to Boston and pleads her case to Agent Zeke Kelso of the FBI, who believes her. The Captain allows Zeke and his agents to tail D.C. during his nightly prowl in hopes he will show them the way to the kidnappers, but the operation goes nowhere, causing Zeke to be taken off the case. But, when Zeke and Patti unsuccessfully attempt to investigate on their own, and, eventually, wind up arrested together. Shortly thereafter, Zeke learns that Patti tampered with the watch, and leaves in anger.

As punishment for her actions, Patti is grounded until further notice by her mother; distraught, she flees the house and prepares to take a train out of town. However, after a conversation with another runaway, Lu, Patti decides to stay in the town of Edgefield. As she walks home to see her parents, Patti notices D.C. digging in a garden; he runs off, and she follows him to the kidnapper's hideout, finally discovering Lizzie's whereabouts.

Patti calls Zeke for help insisting her cat finally found the kidnapper’s location, still upset with him and refuses to listen and believe her. So Patti decides to enter the hideout to intervene and save Lizzie herself, but the kidnappers return and capture her and D.C. Then after Patti’s parents listen to a voicemail Patti left for them, they report her missing to the police as a runaway. Patti's parents call Zeke to ask if he knows where their daughter has run off to. Zeke also now fears that Patti has met the same fate as Lizzie. So to keep his job, Zeke changes his mind and reopens the case. His investigation leads him to the hideout, where he finds Patti and Lizzie bound and gagged, and D.C. trapped in a litter box.

Zeke exposes the identities of the kidnappers as the seemingly harmless "Ma and Pa", the owners of the local candy shop. Ma and Pa kidnapped Lizzie because they had partied away all their cash in Monte Carlo and the Riviera, and were craving both more money and more excitement. Zeke manages to free Patti and D.C. while Ma and Pa escape with Lizzie in their car. D.C., Patti, and Zeke pursue them through the town, but due to an earlier sabotage caused by competing mechanics, the kidnapper's car can only turn left, hindering their escape. During the car chase, a fence gets knocked down, releasing the crazy local dog Smokey, who runs into the nearby cat show, scaring away all the competing cats. D.C. rallies the show cats to run with him along the roofs of the neighborhood and jump down onto Ma and Pa's car, causing it to crash, foiling their crimes.

Ma and Pa are arrested and charged with kidnapping, Lizzie is reunited with the Flints, and Patti, Zeke and D.C. return home with her parents and are hailed as heroes. The town returns to normal; Patti and Zeke become partners, and D.C. mates with the neighborhood cat and fathers a litter of kittens.

== Cast ==
- Christina Ricci as Patti Randall
- Doug E. Doug as Agent Zeke Kelso
- Dean Jones as Mr. Flint
- George Dzundza as FBI Capt. Boetticher
- Peter Boyle as Pa
- Michael McKean as Peter Randall
- Bess Armstrong as Judy Randall
- Dyan Cannon as Mrs. Flint
- John Ratzenberger as Dusty, a Mechanic
- Megan Cavanagh as Lu the Butcher
- Estelle Parsons as Old Lady McCracken
- Rebecca Schull as Ma
- Tom Wilson as Melvin Yazbo, a Patrol Man
- Brian Haley as Marvin Yazbo, a Patrol Man
- Mark Christopher Lawrence as Rollo, a Mechanic who constantly provokes Dusty
- Rebecca Koon as Lizzie, the Flints' Maid
- Wilbur Fitzgerald as Scientist
- Elvis as D.C. the cat

== Production ==
The film was mainly shot in the areas of Edgefield and North Augusta in South Carolina, as well as in Augusta, Georgia. Animal Makers created the animatronic version of the cat. It was filmed using a 35mm camera for both the colored moving and black and white still pictures.

Buena Vista Home Entertainment distributed the video in most regions, while Abril Vídeo covered Brazil.

== Reception ==
=== Box office ===
The film earned $6,424,617 in its opening weekend and in total grossed $18,301,610 domestically.

It was theatrically released in Australia and New Zealand on August 28, 1997.

=== Critical response ===
That Darn Cat was lambasted by critics. The film currently holds a 13% approval rating on Rotten Tomatoes, based on 15 critics, with an average rating of 4.1/10. Metacritic assigned the film a weighted average score of 36 out of 100 based on 12 critics, indicating "generally unfavorable reviews". Audiences polled by CinemaScore gave the film an average grade of "A-" on an A+ to F scale.

Stephen Holden of the New York Times was not impressed, remarking: "The opening scenes in That Darn Cat suggest that the movie might have found a gently sarcastic attitude in tune with the know-it-all mood of the late 1990s ... Unfortunately, it isn't long before this wised-up tone gives way to a desperate, mindless freneticism that leaves Ms. Ricci mired in her sulk."

Joe Leydon of Variety said: "It's not quite a catastrophe, but the updated remake of "That Darn cat" is a loud and largely charmless trifle." James Berardinelli of Reelviews was a little more lenient, stating "[the film] is a little more quirky than many Disney films, although that trait doesn't make it appreciably more watchable."

In January 1998, it was included on Siskel and Ebert's "Worst Films of 1997" episode.

== Accolades ==
The film, in spite of the poor reception, earned Ricci two award nominations; the first was a Kids Choice Award for "Favorite Movie Actress" and the second was a Young Artist Award - "Young Artist Award for Best Leading Young Actress in a Feature Film".
