= Down Three Dark Streets =

1954 film by Arnold Laven

- Directed by: Arnold Laven
- Screenplay by: Gordon Gordon; Bernard C. Schonefeld
- Based on: Case File: FBI; 1953 novel by Mildred Gordon (as The Gordons)
- Produced by: Arthur Gardner; Jules V. Levy; Edward Small (executive)
- Starring: Broderick Crawford; Ruth Roman
- Cinematography: Joseph F. Biroc
- Edited by: Grant Whytock
- Music by: Paul Sawtell
- Production company: Edward Small Productions
- Distributed by: United Artists
- Release date: September 3, 1954
- Running time: 85 minutes
- Country: United States
- Language: English
- Budget: $275,000
- Box office: $400,000

Down Three Dark Streets (1954), trailer

Down Three Dark Streets is a 1954 American film noir crime film starring Broderick Crawford and Ruth Roman. Directed by Arnold Laven, the picture's screenplay was written by Gordon Gordon and Mildred Gordon, based on their novel Case File FBI.

== Plot ==
FBI agent Zach Stewart is assigned three new cases by his boss, John Ripley, which are added to his existing case load. One involves wanted fugitive Joe Walpo, who has killed a gas-station attendant. Another concerns a department store fashion buyer, Kate Martell, who is being extorted by a man threatening to kill her daughter. A third has to do with a gang of thugs who hijack cars.

While interviewing a woman of concern Stewart was shot dead by a hidden assailant. With the assistance of local L.A.P.D. detectives Ripley picks up Stewart's new cases, thinking that one of them may reveal the identity of Stewart's murderer.

Ripley and his new partner trail Connie Anderson, a girlfriend of Walpo's, to his hideout, where Ripley shoots him. They tie up the car-jacking case and are then able to narrow down who the killer of the FBI agent must be.

They follow Kate to the "Hollywood" sign in the hills above Los Angeles, where she has been told to bring the money. There the extortionist is revealed to be a man named Milson who had shown a romantic interest in Kate, leading to a confrontation with Ripley.

== Cast ==
- Broderick Crawford as FBI Agent John Ripley
- Ruth Roman as Kate Martell
- Martha Hyer as Connie Anderson
- Marisa Pavan as Julie Angelino
- Max Showalter as Dave Milson (as Casey Adams)
- Kenneth Tobey as Zack Stewart
- Gene Reynolds as Vince Angelino
- William Johnstone as Frank Pace
- Harlan Warde as Greg Barker
- Jay Adler as Uncle Max
- Claude Akins as Matty Pavelich
- Suzanne Alexander as Brenda Ralles
- Myra Marsh as Mrs. Domes
- Joe Basselt as Joe Walpo

== Production ==
=== Writing ===
J. Edgar Hoover objected to early drafts of the script.
