= Getting Married (1978 film) =

- Genre: Comedy; Romance
- Written by: John Hudock
- Directed by: Steven Hilliard Stern
- Starring: Richard Thomas; Bess Armstrong; Mark Harmon
- Theme music composer: Craig Safan
- Country of origin: United States
- Original language: English

Production
- Producers: Robert Greenwald; Frank von Zerneck
- Cinematography: Howard Schwartz
- Editor: Kurt Hirschler
- Running time: 100 minutes
- Production companies: Moonlight Productions; Paramount Television

Original release
- Network: CBS
- Release: May 17, 1978

Getting Married is a 1978 American made-for-television romantic comedy film directed by Steven Hilliard Stern, written by John Hudock, and starring Richard Thomas, Bess Armstrong, and Mark Harmon. A man falls in love with a newscaster and attempts to win her heart before she weds another man.

== Plot ==
Michael Carboni, an associate director at a TV studio, falls in love with Kristine Lawrence, the station's newscaster. However, Kristy is due to be married in a week, and Michael has yet to reveal his feelings to her. Michael must find a way to get Kristine's affection and have her call off the wedding.

== Cast ==
- Richard Thomas as Michael Carboni
- Bess Armstrong as Kristine Lawrence
- Mark Harmon as Howard Lesser
- Katherine Helmond as Vera Lesser
- Van Johnson as Phil Lawrence
- Audra Lindley as Catherine Lawrence
- Fabian as Wayne Spanka
- Mark Lenard as Mr. Bloom
- James Chandler as Minister

== Reception ==
Sherry Woods of The Miami Herald called it "a light-hearted piece of fluff". The Los Angeles Times praised the "bright dialogue and winning characterisations" but said "there's an underlying queasiness to the premise".
