= The Changing of the Guard (The Twilight Zone) =

- The Twilight Zone episode
- Episode no.: Season 3 Episode 37
- Directed by: Robert Ellis Miller
- Written by: Rod Serling
- Production code: 4835
- Original air date: June 1, 1962

Guest appearances
- Donald Pleasence; Liam Sullivan; Philippa Bevans; Tom Lowell; Russell Horton; Buddy Hart; Darryl Richard

Episode chronology
| ← Previous "Cavender Is Coming" | Next → "In His Image" |
- The Twilight Zone (1959 TV series) (season 3)

"The Changing of the Guard" is the 102nd episode of the American television anthology series The Twilight Zone.

== Opening narration ==
Professor Ellis Fowler, a gentle, bookish guide to the young, who is about to discover that life still has certain surprises, and that the campus of the Rock Spring School for Boys lies on a direct path to another institution, commonly referred to as the Twilight Zone.

== Plot ==
Professor Ellis Fowler is an elderly English literature teacher at the Rock Spring School, a boys' prep school in Vermont, who is forced into retirement after teaching for 51 years at the school. Looking through his old yearbooks and reminiscing about his former students, he becomes convinced that all of his lessons have been in vain and that he has accomplished nothing with his life.

Deeply depressed, he prepares to kill himself on the night of Christmas Eve next to a statue of the famous educator Horace Mann, with its quote "Be ashamed to die until you have won some victory for humanity." Before he can follow through, however, he is called back to his classroom by a phantom bell, where he is visited by ghosts of seven boys who were his students, all dead, several of whom died heroically. Four of the former students were soldiers who died in wars, including an award for the Congressional Gold Medal and one who died of radiation exposure after doing research into X-ray cancer treatment.

The boys tell him of how he inspired them to become better men, and the difference he made in their lives. One posthumously received the Medal of Honor for actions at Iwo Jima; another died of leukemia after exposure to X-Rays during research into cancer treatments; another died at Pearl Harbor after saving 12 other men. All were inspired by Fowler's teachings. Moved to tears, Fowler hears the phantom bell again, and his former pupils disappear. Now accepting of his retirement, content that his life is fuller for having enriched the lives of the boys, he listens to his current students caroling outside his home.

== Closing narration ==
Professor Ellis Fowler, teacher, who discovered rather belatedly something of his own value. A very small scholastic lesson, from the campus of the Twilight Zone.

== Production notes ==
Donald Pleasence was heavily made up to appear much older than his actual age of 42.

The quote Professor Fowler reads on the statue's plinth, "Be ashamed to die until you have won some victory for humanity", is the motto of Rod Serling's alma mater Antioch College, and was spoken by its first president Horace Mann at the college's first commencement. Serling accepted a teaching post there after completing this script.

== Cast ==
- Donald Pleasence as Professor Ellis Fowler
- Liam Sullivan as Headmaster
- Philippa Bevans as Mrs. Landers
- Tom Lowell as Artie Beechcroft
- Russell Horton as Bartlett
- Buddy Hart as Dickie Weiss
- Darryl Richard as Thompson

== Sources ==
- Zicree, Marc Scott: The Twilight Zone Companion. Sillman-James Press, 1982 (second edition)
- DeVoe, Bill. (2008). Trivia from The Twilight Zone. Albany, GA: Bear Manor Media. ISBN 978-1-59393-136-0
