= Darryl Richard (actor) =

American television and theatre actor (born 1946)

- Born: Darryl Richard Rosenberg; March 18, 1946 (age 80); United States
- Occupations: Television and theatre actor
- Years active: 1953–present

Darryl Richard Rosenberg (born March 18, 1946) is an American television and theatre actor. He is known for playing the role of Morton "Smitty" Smith in the American sitcom television series The Donna Reed Show.

Born in the United States. Richard began his career in 1953, first appearing in the anthology television series Suspense, where he played the role of Ivan. He then appeared on Broadway plays from 1954, appearing in the Broadway play King of Hearts, in which he played the role of Billy. His theatre appearances include Miss Isobel, A Roomful of Roses, Portofino, Harbor Lights and Cat on a Hot Tin Roof. Richard guest-starred in television programs including Mr. Novak, The Phil Silvers Show, The Rifleman, The Detectives, Sam Benedict, The Betty Hutton Show, The Twilight Zone S3 E37 " The Changing of the Guard" (with Tom Lowell) and The Tom Ewell Show.

In 1961, Richard played the role of Morton "Smitty" Smith in the American sitcom television series The Donna Reed Show, the best friend of Jeff Stone (Paul Petersen). He retired from acting in 1966, later being president of the company Rich-Art Productions.
