= Tibor Rubin =

US Army soldier, Medal of Honor recipient (1929–2015)

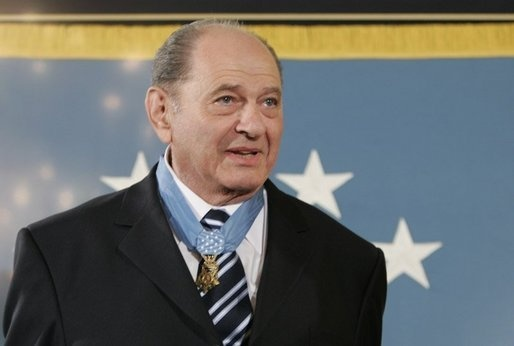
- Rubin wearing the Medal of Honor in September 2005
- Born: June 18, 1929; Pásztó, Hungary
- Died: December 5, 2015 (aged 86); Garden Grove, California, U.S.
- Burial place: Mount Sinai Memorial Park Cemetery; Los Angeles, California
- Spouse: Yvonne Meyers (m. 1963)
- Children: 2
- Military career
- Allegiance: United States
- Branch: United States Army
- Service years: 1950–1953
- Rank: Corporal
- Nickname: Ted
- Units: Company I, 8th Cavalry Regiment, First Cavalry Division
- Conflicts: Korean War
- Awards: Medal of Honor; Purple Heart (2)

Tibor "Ted" Rubin (June 18, 1929 – December 5, 2015) was a Hungarian-American Army Corporal. A Holocaust survivor who immigrated to the U.S. in 1948, he fought in the Korean War and was awarded the Medal of Honor for his actions during the war, as a combatant and a prisoner of war (POW).

Rubin received the award from President George W. Bush on September 23, 2005, 55 years after the Korean War. Rubin was repeatedly nominated for various military decorations, but was overlooked because of antisemitism by a superior. Fellow soldiers who filed affidavits supporting Rubin's nomination for the Medal of Honor said that Rubin's sergeant "was an anti-Semite who gave Rubin dangerous assignments in hopes of getting him killed". In November, 2016, President Obama signed legislation renaming the Long Beach California VA Medical Center after Rubin.

== Early life ==
Rubin was born on June 18, 1929, in Pásztó, a Hungarian town with a Jewish population of 120 families, one of six children (by three marriages) of shoemaker Ferenc Rubin.

When Tibor was 13, Ferenc and Rosa Rubin (Tibor's stepmother) tried to send him to safety in neutral Switzerland, but he was caught and sent to the Mauthausen concentration camp in Austria. He was liberated by American combat troops when they arrived at Mauthausen on May 5, 1945. Both of his parents and a sister were murdered in the Holocaust.

== Emigration to the United States ==
Rubin entered the United States in 1948, settled in New York and worked first as a shoemaker. He then apprenticed as a butcher at Michael Bela Wilhelm's Hungarian butcher shop on Third Avenue in the Yorkville neighborhood for about a year.

In 1949, he tried to enlist in the U.S. Army. He failed the English language test, but tried again in 1950 and passed with some judicious help from two fellow test-takers.

== Antisemitism in the army ==
By July 1950, Private First Class Rubin found himself fighting in South Korea with I Company, 8th Cavalry Regiment, First Cavalry Division. According to lengthy affidavits submitted by nearly a dozen men who served with Rubin in South and North Korea, mostly self-described "country boys" from the South and Midwest, an antisemitic sergeant named Arthur Peyton consistently "volunteered" Rubin for the most dangerous patrols and missions.

During one mission, according to the testimonies of his comrades, Rubin secured a needed route of retreat for his rifle company by single-handedly defending a hill for 24 hours against waves of North Korean soldiers. For this and other acts of bravery, Rubin was recommended four times for the Medal of Honor by two of his commanding officers. Both officers were killed in action shortly afterwards, but not before ordering Rubin's sergeant to begin the necessary paperwork recommending Rubin for the Medal of Honor. Some of Rubin's comrades were present and witnessed the order being issued, and all are convinced that Peyton deliberately ignored his orders. "I really believe, in my heart, that [the sergeant] would have jeopardized his own safety rather than assist in any way whatsoever in the awarding of the Medal of Honor to a person of Jewish descent", wrote Corporal Harold Speakman in a notarized affidavit.

== Chinese POW camp ==
Towards the end of October 1950, massive Chinese troop concentrations had crossed the border into North Korea and were attacking the unprepared American troops now trapped far inside North Korea. Most of Rubin's regiment had been killed or captured. Rubin, severely wounded, was captured and spent the next 30 months in a prisoner of war camp.

Faced with constant hunger, filth, and disease, most of the GIs simply gave up. "No one wanted to help anyone. Everybody was for himself", wrote Leo A. Cormier Jr., a former sergeant and POW. The exception was Rubin. Almost every evening, Rubin would sneak out of the prison camp to steal food from the Chinese and North Korean supply depots, knowing that he would be shot if caught. "He shared the food evenly among the GIs," Cormier wrote. "He also took care of us, nursed us, carried us to the latrine..., he did many good deeds, which he told us were mitzvahs in the Jewish tradition... he was a very religious Jew and helping his fellow men was the most important thing to him". The survivors of the prison war camp credited Rubin with keeping them alive and saving at least 40 American soldiers.

Rubin refused his captors' repeated offers of repatriation to Hungary, by then behind the Iron Curtain.

== Medal of Honor ==
In 1993, a study was commissioned by the United States Army to investigate racial discrimination in the awarding of medals. In 2001, after considering the case of Leonard M. Kravitz, Congress directed the military to further review certain cases. The ensuing investigation showed that Rubin had been the subject of discrimination due to his religion and should have received the Medal of Honor.

In 2005, President George W. Bush presented the Medal of Honor to Rubin in a ceremony at the White House, for his actions in 1950 during the Korean War.

=== Citation ===

For conspicuous gallantry and intrepidity at the risk of his life above and beyond the call of duty: Corporal Tibor Rubin distinguished himself by extraordinary heroism during the period from July 23, 1950, to April 20, 1953, while serving as a rifleman with Company I, 8th Cavalry Regiment, 1st Cavalry Division in the Republic of Korea. While his unit was retreating to the Pusan Perimeter, Corporal Rubin was assigned to stay behind to keep open the vital Taegu-Pusan Road link used by his withdrawing unit. During the ensuing battle, overwhelming numbers of North Korean troops assaulted a hill defended solely by Corporal Rubin. He inflicted a staggering number of casualties on the attacking force during his personal 24-hour battle, single-handedly slowing the enemy advance and allowing the 8th Cavalry Regiment to complete its withdrawal successfully. Following the breakout from the Pusan Perimeter, the 8th Cavalry Regiment proceeded northward and advanced into North Korea. During the advance, he helped capture several hundred North Korean soldiers. On October 30, 1950, Chinese forces attacked his unit at Unsan, North Korea, during a massive nighttime assault. That night and throughout the next day, he manned a .30 caliber machine gun at the south end of the unit's line after three previous gunners became casualties. He continued to man his machine gun until his ammunition was exhausted. His determined stand slowed the pace of the enemy advance in his sector, permitting the remnants of his unit to retreat southward. As the battle raged, Corporal Rubin was severely wounded and captured by the Chinese. Choosing to remain in the prison camp despite offers from the Chinese to return him to his native Hungary, Corporal Rubin disregarded his own personal safety and immediately began sneaking out of the camp at night in search of food for his comrades. Breaking into enemy food storehouses and gardens, he risked certain torture or death if caught. Corporal Rubin provided not only food to the starving Soldiers, but also desperately needed medical care and moral support for the sick and wounded of the POW camp. His brave, selfless efforts were directly attributed to saving the lives of as many as forty of his fellow prisoners. Corporal Rubin's gallant actions in close contact with the enemy and unyielding courage and bravery while a prisoner of war are in the highest traditions of military service and reflect great credit upon himself and the United States Army.

== Later life and death ==
After his military service, he worked in his brother's Long Beach liquor store. Rubin was a resident of Garden Grove, California.

He regularly volunteered at the Long Beach Veterans Hospital, having earned an award for more than 20,000 hours of volunteer work. On May 10, 2017, the Medical Center was renamed in his honor as the "Tibor Rubin VA Medical Center".

Rubin died December 5, 2015, at his home in Garden Grove. He was survived by his wife Yvonne and their two children, Frank and Rosie.

== Awards and decorations ==
Corporal Rubin received the following awards for his service

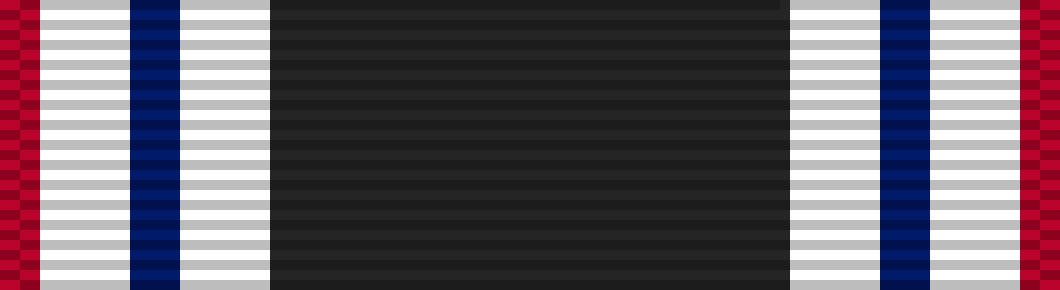

Badge	Combat Infantryman Badge		
1st row	Medal of Honor Retroactively Awarded, 2001	Purple Heart with 1 Oak leaf cluster	Prisoner of War Medal Retroactively Awarded, 1985
2nd row	Army Good Conduct Medal	Army of Occupation Medal with 'Japan' clasp	National Defense Service Medal
3rd row	Korean Service Medal with 4 Campaign stars	United Nations Service Medal Korea	Korean War Service Medal Retroactively Awarded, 2003
Unit Awards	Korean Presidential Unit Citation		

1st Cavalry Division Patch

== Finnigan's War ==
Tibor Rubin is one of the Korean War heroes honored in the 2013 documentary Finnigan's War, directed by Conor Timmis. Rubin recalls his Holocaust experience and Korean War POW experience. Rubin's interview is intercut with footage of President George W. Bush telling Rubin's life story during his 2005 Medal of Honor ceremony. Actor Mark Hamill narrates Rubin's Medal of Honor citation in the film. Filmmaker Conor Timmis was greatly impressed by Rubin's positive attitude and sense of humor despite all the suffering he endured during his life.

== See also ==
- List of Korean War Medal of Honor recipients
- List of Jewish Medal of Honor recipients
- Single Handed (book) by Daniel M. Cohen
