= Make Haste to Live =

1954 film by William A. Seiter

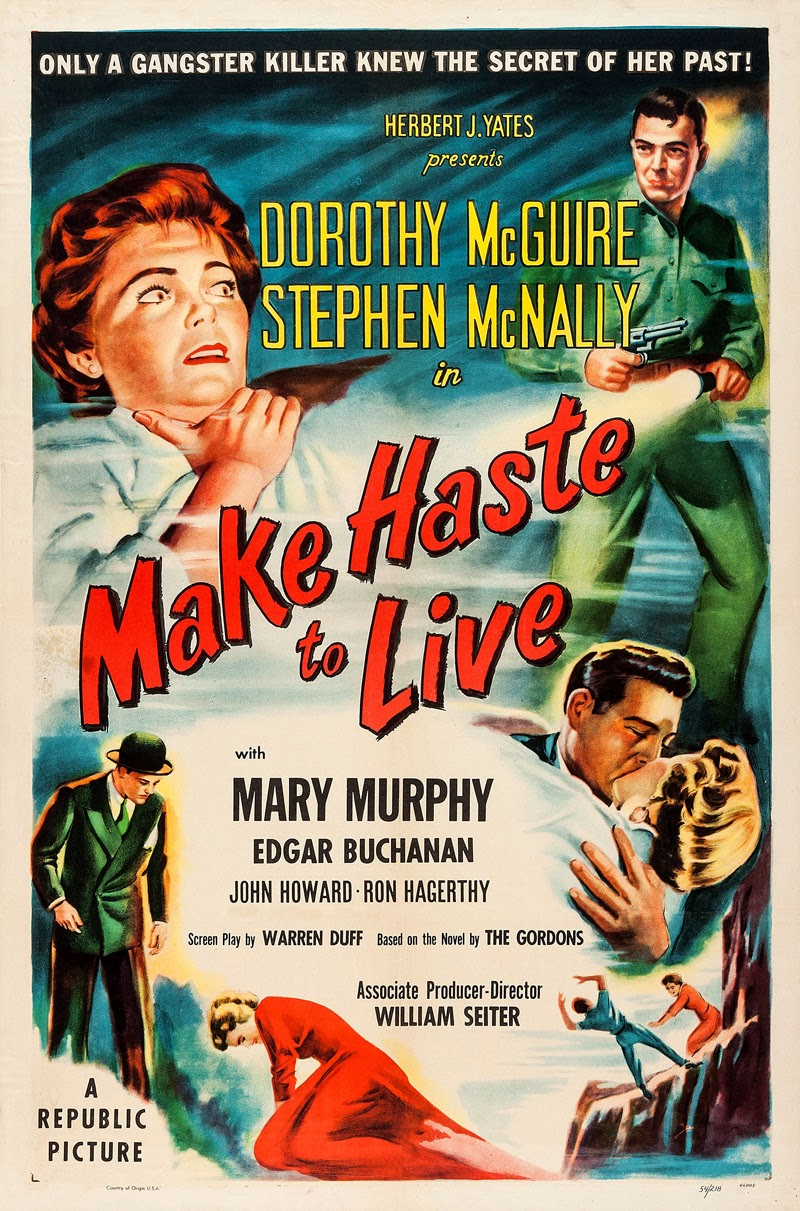
- Theatrical release poster
- Directed by: William A. Seiter
- Screenplay by: Warren B. Duff
- Based on: Make Haste to Live; 1950 novel by Mildred Gordon; Gordon Gordon
- Produced by: William A. Seiter
- Starring: Dorothy McGuire; Stephen McNally; Mary Murphy
- Cinematography: John L. Russell
- Edited by: Fred Allen
- Music by: Elmer Bernstein
- Color process: Black and white
- Production company: Republic Pictures
- Distributed by: Republic Pictures
- Release date: March 25, 1954 (New York City)
- Running time: 90 minutes
- Country: United States
- Language: English

Make Haste to Live is a 1954 American film noir thriller film directed by William A. Seiter and starring Dorothy McGuire, Stephen McNally and Mary Murphy. Seiter's last feature directorial effort, the film is an adaptation of the Gordons’ novel of the same name. It was produced and distributed by Republic Pictures.

== Plot ==
Crystal Benson is a single mother living in a small town in New Mexico. One afternoon, her teenage daughter, Randy, mentions running into a man who tells her she reminds him of someone he once knew.

Crystal, already jumpy and unable to sleep, knows that this man is her mobster husband, Steve. She knows that he has recently been paroled from prison after serving 18 years. When she first met Steve, she had been captivated by him but, upon discovering his vicious behavior, including involvement in the murder of a police officer, she took their baby and fled.

Expecting Steve to exact murderous revenge on her, Crystal prepares a tape recording explaining everything about her relationship with the man. She puts aside the recording, and money, for Randy to access after her mother's death.

Steve insinuates himself into their lives; he makes it clear he wants to take Randy away and that he will fulfill his long-held plan to torment, and likely kill, Crystal. She tells everyone he is her brother, with whom she has had a difficult, often estranged history. Randy enjoys having her "uncle" in her life.

Crystal organizes an escape for her daughter and herself; she is, however, seemingly transparent to Steve, and he is always, until the end, on her trail.

== Cast ==
- Dorothy McGuire as Crystal Benson
- Stephen McNally as Steve
- Mary Murphy as Randy Benson
- Edgar Buchanan as Sheriff
- John Howard as Josh
- Ron Hagerthy as Hack
- Pepe Hern as Rodolfo Gonzales
- Eddy Waller as Spud Kelly
- Carolyn Jones as Mary Rose
- Rosa Turich as Juana
- Julian Rivero as Carlos
- Celia Lovsky as Mother
- William Bailey as Ed Jenkins
- Argentina Brunetti as Mrs. Gonzales
- Bob Carney as Round-Faced Man
- Joseph Vitale as Big Man
- Paul Lukather as Deputy
- Dickie Humphreys as Dancer
- Norma La Roche as Señorita

== Reception ==
Bosley Crowther of The New York Times wrote, "Warren Duff's screen play is hackneyed and William A. Seiter's direction is dull. No one's performance is exciting. Only Edgar Buchanan as a sheriff seems slightly real."

Lobby posters from the film

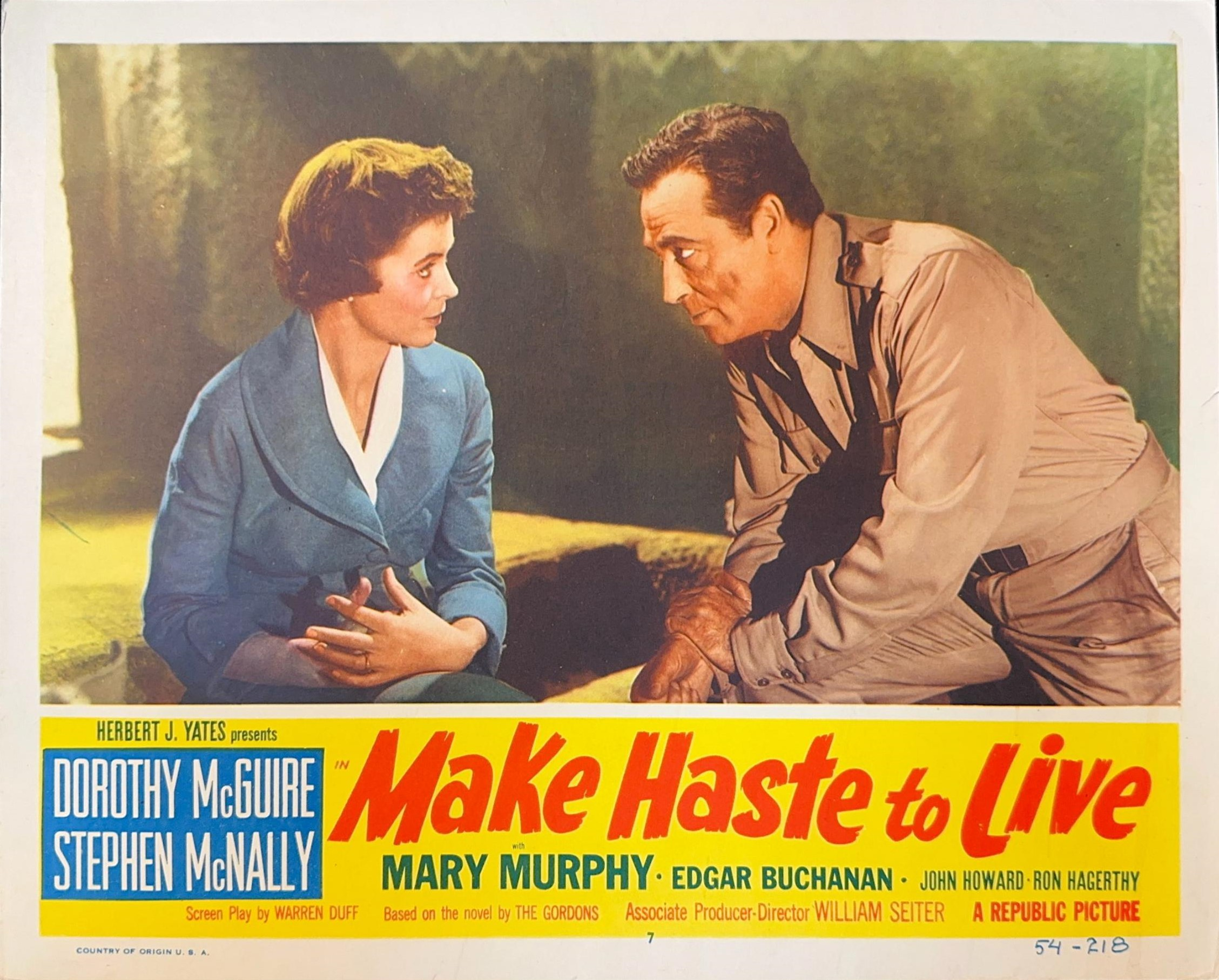

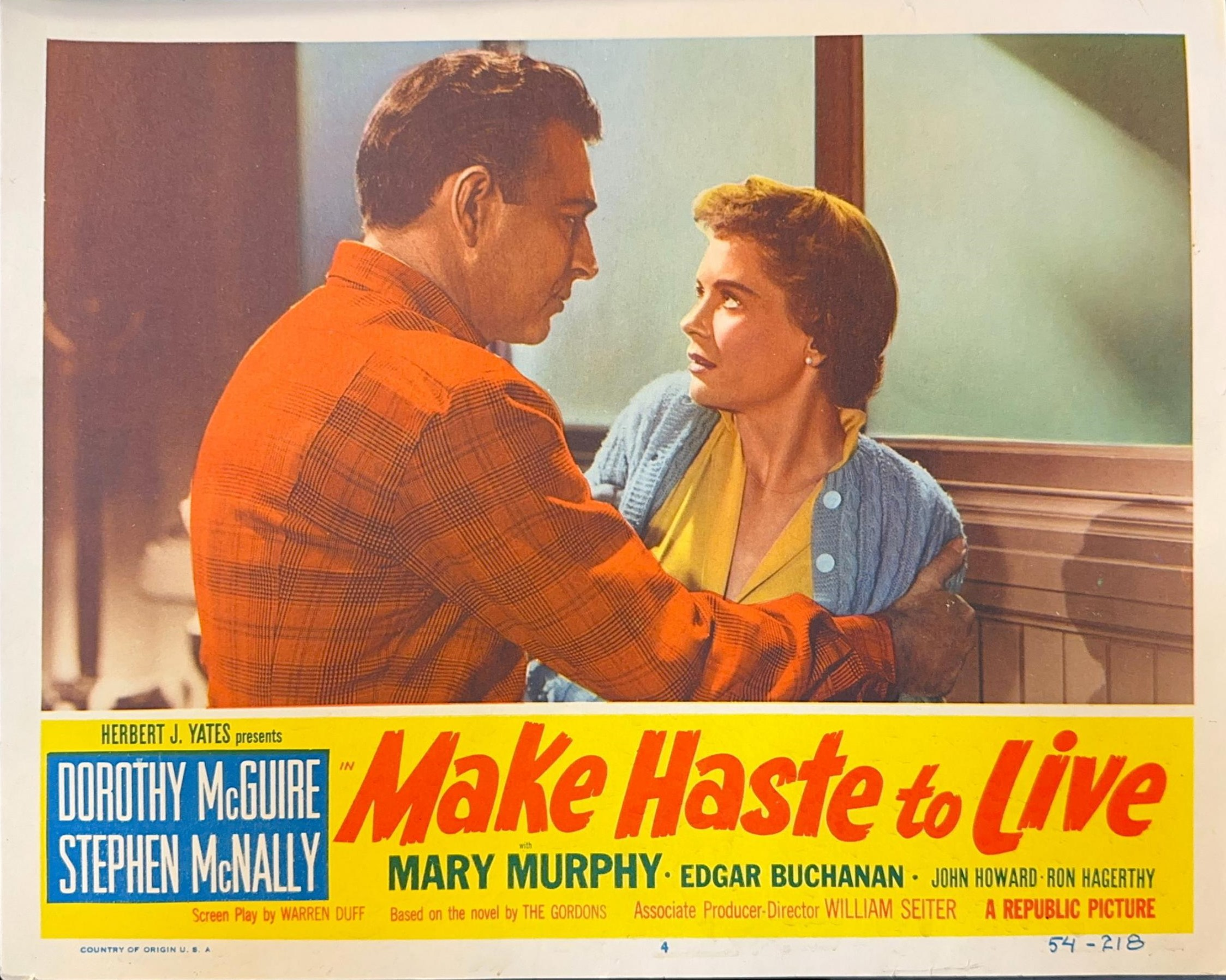
