= Mixed Blessings (novel) =

1993 novel by Danielle Steel

- First edition
- Author: Danielle Steel
- Language: English
- Genre: Romance novel
- Publisher: Delacorte Press
- Publication date: December 1992
- Publication place: United States
- Media type: Print (hardback & paperback)
- Pages: 448 pp
- ISBN: 0-440-21411-4
- OCLC: 29377190

Mixed Blessings is a romance novel written by Danielle Steel. The plot follows three different couples trying to make ethical decisions about modern day lives and family life. The book was published by Dell Publishing in December 1992. It is Steel's 30th novel.

== Television adaptations ==
Mixed Blessings was adapted for television by NBC in 1995. Scott Baio, Bess Armstrong, Gabrielle Carteris, and Bruce Greenwood led the cast.
