= Diamond Men =

- Directed by: Dan Cohen
- Written by: Dan Cohen
- Produced by: Dan Cohen; Executive producer Robert Field; Robert Forster
- Starring: Robert Forster; Donnie Wahlberg
- Cinematography: John Huneck
- Edited by: Rick Derby
- Music by: Garrett Parks
- Distributed by: Lions Gate Entertainment
- Release date: October 2000 (Hamptons International Film Festival)
- Running time: 100 min
- Country: United States
- Language: English

Diamond Men is a 2000 film, a crime drama starring Robert Forster and Donnie Wahlberg.

The independent film was written and directed by Dan Cohen, and was screened at the Hamptons International Film Festival in October 2000. It was released to select theatres in the US on September 14, 2001.

== Plot ==
Eddie Miller (Robert Forster) is a traveling salesman, servicing towns in Pennsylvania.

== Cast ==
- Robert Forster as Eddie Miller
- Donnie Wahlberg as Bobby Walker
- Bess Armstrong as Katie Harnish
- Jasmine Guy as Tina
- George Coe as 'Tip' Rountree
- Jeff Gendelman as Brad
- Glenn Phillips as Mick
- Paul Price as Carl
- Paul Hewitt as Fess
- Leonard Kelly-Young as Brennan
- Douglas Allen Johnson as John Ludwig
- KaDee Strickland as Monica
- Nikki Fritz as Fran
- Kristin Minter as Cherry
- Shannah Laumeister Stern as Amber
- Katie Rimmer as Priscilla
- Kateri Walker as Melody
- Kathleen Conner as Angel
- Melissa Greenspan as Krystal
- Jana Ferner as Emily
- Bruce Smirnoff as Executive
- James C. Burns as Detective
- Kate Forster as Customer
- Irving Simons as Jeweler
