= Tom Lowell =

American film and television actor

- Lowell in The Twilight Zone, 1962
- Born: Lowell Thomas; January 17, 1941 (age 85); Philadelphia, Pennsylvania, U.S.
- Occupations: Film and television actor
- Years active: 1962–1999

Lowell Thomas (born January 17, 1941) is an American film and television actor. He is best known for playing baby-faced Private Billy Nelson in the American drama television series Combat!.

== Life and career ==
Lowell was born in Philadelphia, Pennsylvania. He began his screen career in 1962, appearing in the CBS anthology television series The Twilight Zone in the episode "The Changing of the Guard", which he appeared with Darryl Richard. In the same year, he played the recurring role of Alan Harper in the CBS sitcom television series The Lucy Show, and he made two appearances in the CBS legal drama television series Perry Mason in the episodes "The Case of the Careless Kidnapper" and "The Case of the Lurid Letter".

Later in his career, from 1962 to 1964, Lowell played baby-faced Private Billy Nelson in the ABC drama television series Combat!. He guest-starred in television programs including Gunsmoke, Bonanza, Death Valley Days, Daniel Boone, Green Acres, Quincy, M.E., Addams Family, The Invaders and The Big Valley. In 1967, he starred as Jasper in the film The Gnome-Mobile, starring along with Walter Brennan, Matthew Garber, Karen Dotrice, Ed Wynn, Richard Deacon and Sean McClory. He also appeared in films such as Mr. Hobbs Takes a Vacation, The Manchurian Candidate, The Carpetbaggers and That Darn Cat!.

Lowell retired from acting in 1999, last appearing in the film Love and Action in Chicago.
