= Shannah Laumeister Stern =

Shannah Laumeister Stern (born July 23, 1969) is an American actress, screenwriter, and film director.

She was married to photographer Bert Stern (1929–2013), whose life story was told in her 2011 documentary, Bert Stern: Original Madman.

== Acting ==
- 1988 Mondo New York, as self
- 1994 Bullets Over Broadway, as Movie Theatre Victim
- 1994 Nobody's Fool, as Didi
- 1995 The Brady Bunch Movie, as Molly
- 1997 Vegas Vacation, as Mariah
- 1997 Women: Stories of Passion (TV series), as Angelica
- 1997 One Hour After Midnight, as Brigitte
- 1997 Click (TV mini-series), as Della
- 1998 Detour, as Crystal
- 1999 NYPD Blue, as Tammy
- 1999 Mad Cows, as group leader
- 1999 See Dick Die, as Monica
- 2000 Diamond Men, as Amber
- 2001 61*, as Pretty Young Woman
- 2001 Echos of Enlightenment, as Marie
- 2003 Seventh Veil
- 2004 Goodnight, Joseph Parker, as Gino's Girl
- 2006 Where's Daddy!, as Rachael
- 2007 Sweetzer, as Kelly
- 2015 Permission to Touch
- 2017 In God's Time, as Karen Pillips
- 2020 The Inconsiderables: Last Exit Out of Hollywood, as Witch

== Writer ==
- 2011 Bert Stern: Original Madman
- 2007 No Destination (Short)
- 2006 Where's Daddy! (Short)
- 2003 Emmanuelle Private Collection: Sex Goddess

== Director ==
- 2006 Where's Daddy! (Short)
- 2007 No Destination (Short)
- 2011 Bert Stern: Original Madman
