= Suzanne Alexander =

American actress (1931–1975)

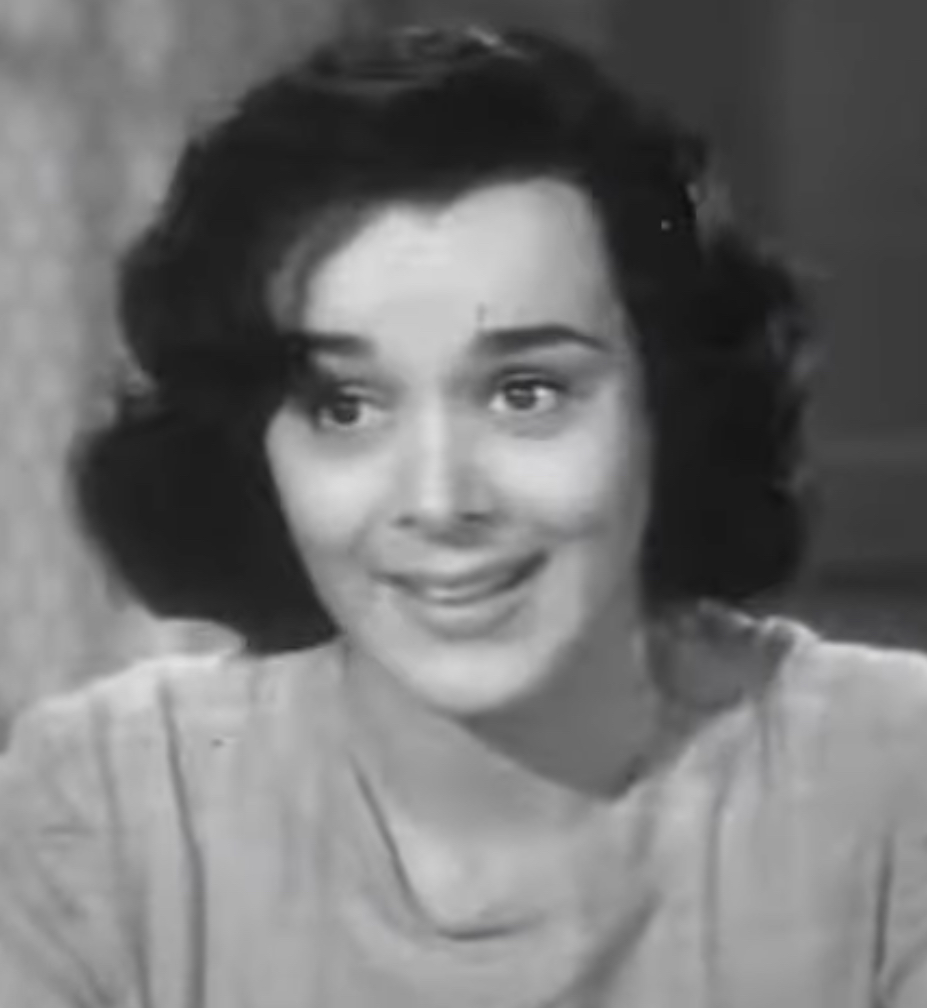
- Alexander in an episode of The Public Defender (1955)
- Born: Gwendolyn (or Gwendolynne) Ann White; September 8, 1931; Toronto, Canada
- Died: September 21, 1975 (aged 44); San Francisco, California, U.S.
- Resting place: Forest Lawn Memorial Park, Hollywood Hills, California
- Occupation: Actress
- Years active: 1949–1975
- Spouse: Rexford Colbert (m. 1963; div. 1966)

Suzanne Alexander (born Gwendolyn (or Gwendolynne) Ann White; September 8, 1931 – September 21, 1975) was a Canadian actress and model.

== Early life ==
Alexander was the daughter of William James "Will" White (1887–1980) and Gwendolyn Haynes (1896–1978). Her father was a conductor and bandleader, while her mother was an actress who played Miss Canada in the film Victory's Call to Canada (1917). She had a brother named Will J. White, who became an actor as well. After studying at the American Academy of Dramatic Arts, Alexander was crowned Miss Studio City and Miss San Fernando Valley of 1949.

== Career ==
Aged 19, she starred in the stage production of Detective Story alongside Frank Fiumara on June 4, 1951, at the Ivar Theater. This followed with starring roles in Cat-Women of the Moon (1953) as Beta and Down Three Dark Streets (1954) as Brenda Ralles. She appeared in various television series including Crossroads, Public Defender, and Racket Squad. She co-hosted Queen for a Day and Juke Box Jury. In an interview with James Bacon in 1959, Suzanne said "I've always wanted to be an actress ever since I could remember."

Mike Todd considered Alexander for the role of Princess Aouda in Around the World in 80 Days (1956) after seeing her dining at the Hollywood Plaza Hotel. She tested for the role on September 15, 1955, alongside Marla English, Jacqueline Park, Lisa Davis, Audrey Conti, Eugenia Paul, Joan Elan, and Eleanore Tanin. Alexander and English were then selected as the finalists for the role, and did a second screen test the following day. The role was ultimately played by Shirley MacLaine, who accepted it after having turned it down twice. Her test screen footage was donated to the Library of Congress by Elizabeth Taylor, where it is preserved.

== Later years ==
Alexander had a brief marriage with Rexford Colbert, who was the manager of the MGM Commissary. Her last onscreen roles was were on episodes of This is the Life and Mod Squad. She died on September 21, 1975, aged 44, in San Francisco, California. Alexander was buried at the Forest Lawn Memorial Park in Hollywood Hills, California. She was survived by her mother and brother.

== Filmography ==
- Flight Nurse (1953) - uncredited
- Cat-Women of the Moon (1953)
- Down Three Dark Streets (1954)
- Princess of the Nile (1954)
- Daddy Long Legs (1955) - uncredited
- The Girl in the Red Velvet Swing (1955) - uncredited
- Solid Gold Cadillac (1956) - uncredited
- The Garment Jungle (1957) - uncredited
- I Married a Woman (1958) - uncredited
