= Liam Sullivan =

American actor (1923–1998)

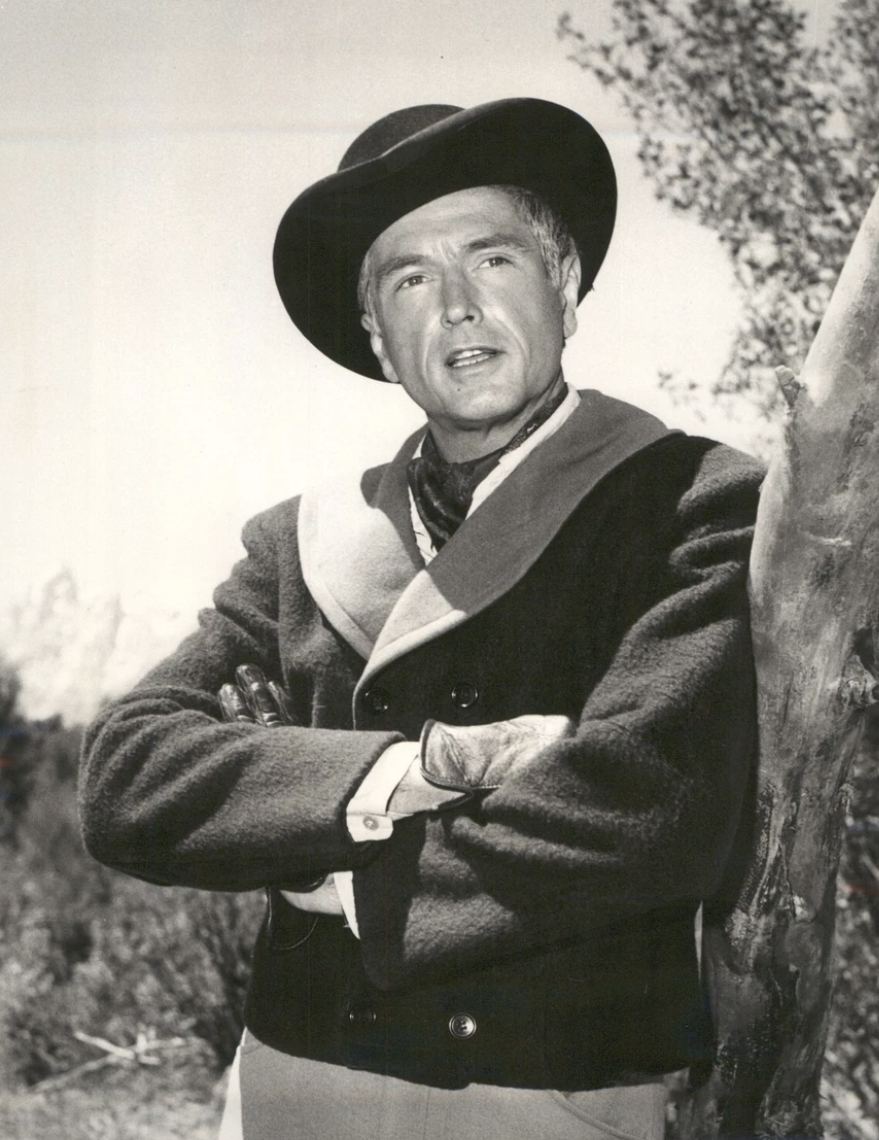
- Sullivan in The Monroes, 1967
- Born: William Edward Sullivan; May 18, 1923; Jacksonville, Illinois, U.S.
- Died: April 19, 1998 (aged 74); Los Angeles, California, U.S.
- Resting place: Diamond Grove Cemetery, Jacksonville, Illinois
- Occupations: Actor, singer
- Years active: 1950–1997

Liam Sullivan (May 18, 1923 – April 19, 1998) was an American actor and singer.

== Early life and education ==
Liam Sullivan was born William Edward Sullivan in Jacksonville, Illinois, the son of Lee A. Sullivan (1889–1968) and Nell Sullivan (née Griffiths, 1891–1957). He attended Jacksonville High School, where he was involved in acting. He began acting while a student at Illinois College and continued in theater at Harvard University.

== Career ==
Sullivan began his career on Broadway in 1951, appearing in The Constant Nymph. Sullivan appeared mostly in television roles during his career. In the mid-1950s, he appeared on the religion anthology series Crossroads. In 1961–62, Sullivan made three guest appearances on Perry Mason, including the 1962 episode "The Case of the Unsuitable Uncle" and in each episode played the murder victim. He portrayed Patrick Henry in the Daniel Boone episode "Love and Equity", scientist Anthony Sterling in the Voyage to the Bottom of the Sea episode "Leviathan", Nexus in the Lost in Space episode "His Majesty Smith", an army lieutenant in the episode "The Winter Soldier" on Rawhide, Mr. Willis in Knots Landing, Dr. Burt Hammond in St. Elsewhere, and Mr. Plenn in Falcon Crest. In 1966, he portrayed Terrence O'Toole in an episode of Bonanza ("The Dublin Lad"). He also appeared as Dr. Tolvar in a 1976 episode of Hawaii Five-O ("The Capsule Kidnapping").

He played the prosecuting attorney in the "Hill 256" episode of Combat! In the Dragnet episode "The Big Prophet" (1968), Sullivan as his character Brother William (a thinly disguised portrayal of Timothy Leary) held forth for the entire half-hour on the benefits of LSD and marijuana while Joe Friday argued the opposing view. Sullivan played a similar role on a 1970 episode of Adam 12 as a con artist/cult leader.

In 1966–67 season, he appeared as Major Mapoy in all twenty-six episodes of the ABC Western series The Monroes with Michael Anderson, Jr., and Barbara Hershey. He appeared in films such as That Darn Cat! (1965) as Graham and The Magic Sword (1962).

In 1966, Sullivan guest starred opposite William Shatner on Gunsmoke, playing “Benjamin Ellis”, a Quaker forced to hide a gunman in S12E12's “Quaker Girl”. Two years later he was back with Shatner, this time performing the role of Parmen, a supremely arrogant and cruel telekinetic alien, in the Star Trek episode "Plato's Stepchildren" (1968). He was also featured in the The Twilight Zone episodes "The Changing of the Guard" and "The Silence". In the latter episode S2 E25, which aired in 1961, he played a youngish and overly loquacious member of a gentleman's club who accepts a challenging and rather bizarre bet offered by an older member of the club (played by actor Franchot Tone) that ends in unintended consequences. In the former episode S3 E37, which aired a year later in 1962, Sullivan played the headmaster of a private boarding school who must deliver the bad news to an "aging out" teacher, played by Donald Pleasence.

Telepathy was the subject of experiments Sullivan conducted in the documentary film from 1977 called The Amazing World of Psychic Phenomena hosted by Raymond Burr. Sullivan often portrayed villains throughout his acting career. He once said, "Playing truly evil people is a great way to release tension and anger and disgust with humanity. Show bad people what they really look and act like and maybe they'll recognize themselves and change. Who knows?"

== Death ==
Sullivan died on April 19, 1998, in Los Angeles of a heart attack at the age of 74. He had recently completed a role in Mike Nichols's production of The Little Foxes. When he died, Sullivan was working on two books: a novel and the history of his family's Eli Bridge Co., which was credited with constructing one of the first Ferris wheels. He was interred at Diamond Grove Cemetery in his native Jacksonville, Illinois.

== Filmography ==
=== Film ===
Year	Title	Role	Notes
1960	Requiem to Massacre	Soldier No. 1	
1962	The Magic Sword	Sir Branton	
1964	One Man's Way	Dr. Arthur Gordon	
1965	That Darn Cat!	Graham	
1984	What Waits Below	Lemurian Elder	
1986	Free Ride	Mr. Monroe	
1987	Wisdom	Jake Perry	

=== Television ===
Year	Series	Role	Notes
1957	The Silent Service	Lt. Cmdr. Fred Connaway	S1:E4, "The U.S.S. Sculpin Story"
1957	The Silent Service	Lt. William Walker	S1:E26, "The Final War Patrol"
1957	Gunsmoke	Tom Clegg	"Executioner" (S2:E19)
1958	The Silent Service	Exec. Officer Fred Tucker	S2:E15, "The Hawkbill's Revenge"
1960	Alfred Hitchcock Presents	Father McCann	Season 5 Episode 34: "Cell 227"
1961	Have Gun – Will Travel	The Prisoner	"Judge" (S4E14)
1961	Bat Masterson	Dick Jeffers	"End of the Line"
1961	The Twilight Zone	Jamie Tennyson	S2:E25, "The Silence"
1962	The Twilight Zone	Headmaster	S3:E37, "The Changing of the Guard"
1966	Gunsmoke	Benjamin Ellis	"Quaker Girl" (S12:E12)
1966	Lost in Space	Nexus	"His Majesty Smith" (S1E24)
1966	Bonanza	Terrence O'Toole	"The Dublin Lad" (S7E15)
1968	Star Trek	Parmen	S3:E10, "Plato's Stepchildren"
1970	Adam-12	Merodach	"Shoplift" (S2E26)
1971	The Secret Storm	Alan Dunbar No. 2	Unknown episodes
1976	Hawaii Five-O	Dr. Tolvar	S8:E22, “Capsule Kidnapping”
1980	Little House on the Prairie	Dillon Hyde	S6:E15, "Whatever Happened to the Class of '56?"
1986	The Young and the Restless	Dr. Joseph Lerner	6 episodes
1986	Highway to Heaven	Wilson	"Summit"
1988	General Hospital	Dr. Wallace	Unknown episodes
