= Mixed Blessings (film) =

- DVD cover
- Genre: Drama; Romance
- Based on: Mixed Blessings by Danielle Steel
- Written by: L. Virginia Browne; Rebecca Soladay
- Directed by: Bethany Rooney
- Starring: Gabrielle Carteris; Scott Baio; Bruce Greenwood; James Naughton; Bess Armstrong
- Music by: Mark Snow
- Countries of origin: United States; Canada
- Original language: English

Production
- Executive producer: Douglas S. Cramer
- Production location: Vancouver
- Cinematography: Mike Fash
- Editor: Janet Bartels-Vandagriff
- Running time: 96 minutes
- Production companies: The Cramer Company; NBC Productions

Original release
- Network: CHCH
- Release: December 10, 1995
- Network: NBC
- Release: December 11, 1995

Mixed Blessings, also known as Danielle Steel's Mixed Blessings, is a 1995 American made-for-television romantic drama film directed by Bethany Rooney. The film is based upon the 1993 novel of the same name written by Danielle Steel. It contains three stories of couples who are facing parenthood for the first time. Scott Baio, Bess Armstrong, Gabrielle Carteris, and Bruce Greenwood lead the all-star cast.

== Plot ==
Three couples are followed as they struggle to have children. Diana and Andy Douglas are a newlywed couple with great careers trying to have a baby for eleven months, without any results. As they visit the doctor, they are crushed to find out that Diana has problems with her ovary and she has a 1 in 10,000 chance to become pregnant. Diana, who always wanted to have a child, considers finding a surrogate mother, but the process proves to be very painful because Andy always wanted to have a child as well. She thinks she is preventing him from living his dream and files for divorce.

Eventually, Andy convinces Diana that he only wants to be with her and together, they decide to adopt a child. They find Jane, a student who thinks a baby will destroy her promising future. After giving birth to a girl, Hilary, Diana is filled with joy to finally become a mother. Jane, however, changes her mind and claims her baby back. Meanwhile, Diana turns out to be pregnant after all. In the end, she ends up with two children, following Jane's decision not to have the child after all.

Another plot involves Charlie Winwood, an orphan who, like Diana, always wanted to have children. He is married to Barbie, an aspiring actress who isn't too enthusiastic to become a mother. While Barbie is on a vacation in Las Vegas, Charlie makes a visit to the doctor and finds out he is sterile. However, five weeks later, Barbie announces she is pregnant, which means she cheated on him. Charlie immediately leaves her and later meets Beth, another orphan who is now enjoying her life as a single mother. They fall in love with each other and soon marry. Not only does Charlie become the father figure of her child, but they also decide to adopt another child.

The plot also centers on Pilar and Brad Coleman, an older couple who, after Brad's daughter announces she is pregnant, decide to try to become pregnant as well. The age proves to be a great obstacle. Even after an artificial insemination, she suffers a miscarriage. Crushed, she decides not to continue the process, until she becomes pregnant. She eventually delivers twins, but one of them dies.

== Cast ==
- Gabrielle Carteris as Diana Goode Douglas
- Scott Baio as Charlie Winwood
- Bess Armstrong as Pilar Graham Coleman
- Bruce Greenwood as Andy Douglas
- James Naughton as Brad Coleman
- Alexandra Paul as Beth
- Julie Condra as Barbara Elizabeth "Barbie" Chandler
- Barbara Tyson as Gayle Goode
- Ocean Hellman as Sam Goode
- Janne Mortil as Nancy
- Michelle Beaudoin as Jane
- Michael Cram as Edward
- Bruce Weitz as Dr. Alexander Johnson
- Cassandra Rocan as Baby
- Katelyn Rocan as Baby
- Roger Allford
- Michael Brock
- Brenda Crichlow
- Justine Diewold
- Lesley Ewen
- Elan Ross Gibson
- Barry Greene
- Andrew Guy
- Russell Hamilton
- Corrine Koslo
- Byron Lucas
- Hrothgar Mathews
- Sheelah Megill
- Robyn Palmer
- Herman Poppe
- Nina Roman
- Kavan Smith
- Nicole Spinola
- Sarah Strange
- Sandy Tucker
- Donna Yamamoto

== Production ==
The film was produced by the Cramer Company and NBC Productions. It was filmed on location in Vancouver, Canada. NBC announced their intent to film Mixed Blessings in 1993, alongside a planned adaptation of Star. It had been included in the list of productions for Fall 1994.

== Broadcast ==
Danielle Steel's Mixed Blessings had its world premiere broadcast in Canada on CHCH on December 10, 1995. The film was shown the following night in the U.S. on NBC. The U.S. showing received a Nielsen rating of 12.7 for 12.2 million households.

When the film aired in Australia, it had been rated "M" by censors there for "adult themes" and references to sex.

== Reception ==
John Martin, for The New York Times, described the film as really being three movies rolled into one. He described it as "heavy-handed melodrama" and stated that despite the emotionally-sensitive topic of infertility and the various issues of overcoming it discussed in the film, the tricks used throughout made it "a bad soap opera". David Bianculli gave a one-sentence summary of the film when it aired in 1995, stating that since it wasn't a miniseries, "it's only half as bad as the usual Steel drama." In 1998, when the movie was preempted from the May 29 evening lineup for a sixth NBA East game, he said that it was excellent news.

Kirk Nicewonger, writing for United Feature Syndicate, said that the film contained everything Steel fans had come to expect from the screen adaptations of her novels, adding that it employed "Steel's usual insight into the human soul." He advised readers to interpret that sentence however they preferred to do so.

Mark de la Viña, writing for the Philadelphia Daily News, acknowledged the film as a "tear-jerker", but also commented that it employed "trashy excesses". Steven H. Scheuer, writing for King Features Syndicate, simply gave the film a rating of 2 of 4 stars and called it both "somewhat entertaining" and "syrupy".

Andy Webb, writing for The Movie Scene, found the film to be melodramatic but also commented on how it felt as though viewers had information fed to them rather than the stories progressing naturally. Webb found this aspect "annoying". He also said that the novel's fans would likely be disappointed in the acting overall, but praised the both Greenwood's and Carteris' performances. He did give it a rating of 3 out of 5 stars.

Tony Scott for Variety critiqued the handling of the older couple's fertility woes, stating that the scene addressing the process for artificial insemination was "tasteless", "sophomoric" and "crude". Scott felt most of the actors portrayed their characters in a mechanical fashion and that the characters themselves were uninteresting and "pallid". He also stated that the production quality wasn't up to Cramer's usual standard. Scott was clear in stating that he found the plot contrived, though he did praise Rooney's work with child actor Michael Brock.

Bonnie Malleck for The Hamilton Spectator remained neutral in her review, stating that despite the more narrow focus than Steel's usual formulaic plots, the film delivers precisely what Steel's fans want. While Mike Duffy of the Detroit Free Press agreed with the assessment that Steel's fans would enjoy the show, he gave the film a rating of 1 out of 4 stars. He called the film dull, pointed out that it follows the formula of "happiness, tragedy, more happiness" endemic to Steel's works, and only approved of the performances from Armstrong and Naughton.

Lynne Heffley, writing for the Los Angeles Times, found the dialogue unpleasant and warned viewers about the plethora of sensitive subjects touched upon in the film. She also called the movie "shameless bathos", though noted that she found Armstrong's, Greenwood's, and Baio's performances to almost make the film "respectable".
