= Experiment in Terror =

1962 film by Blake Edwards

- Theatrical release poster
- Directed by: Blake Edwards
- Screenplay by: Mildred Gordon; Gordon Gordon
- Based on: Operation Terror; 1961 novel by Mildred Gordon and Gordon Gordon
- Produced by: Blake Edwards
- Starring: Glenn Ford; Lee Remick; Stefanie Powers
- Cinematography: Philip H. Lathrop
- Edited by: Patrick McCormack
- Music by: Henry Mancini
- Production company: Geoffrey-Kate Productions
- Distributed by: Columbia Pictures
- Release date: April 13, 1962
- Running time: 123 minutes
- Country: United States
- Language: English
- Box office: $1.4 million (US/Canada)

Experiment in Terror is a 1962 American neo-noir thriller film released by Columbia Pictures. It was directed by Blake Edwards and written by Mildred Gordon and Gordon Gordon based on their 1961 novel Operation Terror. The film stars Glenn Ford, Lee Remick, Stefanie Powers and Ross Martin. The musical score was composed by Henry Mancini.

== Plot ==
A sadistic killer, Garland "Red" Lynch, uses a campaign of terror to force San Francisco bank teller Kelly Sherwood to steal $100,000 from the bank for him. Despite Lynch's threat to kill Sherwood or her teenage sister Toby if she goes to the police, and in defiance of the fact that Lynch has created a set-up which alerts him to her activities, Sherwood contacts the San Francisco office of the FBI, where agent John Ripley takes charge of the case.

Ripley interviews another woman who implies that she is involved in some way in a serious crime, but before she can give Ripley the details, Lynch murders her. Sherwood continues to be terrorized with phone calls, an asthmatic condition making the unseen Lynch's voice all the more sinister.

The FBI identifies the criminal, noting that Lynch has a record of convictions for statutory rape, forgery, criminal assault, armed robbery and murder. They track down his girlfriend, Lisa Soong, whose six-year-old son has just had a hip replaced. Lynch is paying all the hospital bills. Because of this, Lisa refuses to believe that Lynch is a criminal and will not cooperate with the investigation. Ripley nevertheless manages to get some information about "Uncle Red" from the boy.

Lynch finally gives Sherwood a time and date to steal the money, and just to make sure that she does, he kidnaps her sister Toby and holds her captive. The climax is a chase through Candlestick Park after a nighttime baseball game between the rival San Francisco Giants and Los Angeles Dodgers. On-field action includes several closeups of Dodgers pitcher Don Drysdale. Ripley and his men ultimately surround Lynch on the infield of the stadium. As Lynch takes aim at a police helicopter, Ripley shoots him and he dies on the pitcher's mound.

== Cast ==
- Glenn Ford as John "Rip" Ripley
- Lee Remick as Kelly Sherwood
- Stefanie Powers as Toby Sherwood
- Ross Martin as Garland Humphrey "Red" Lynch
- Roy Poole as Brad
- Ned Glass as "Popcorn"
- Anita Loo as Lisa Soong
- Patricia Huston as Nancy Ashton
- Gilbert Green as Special Agent
- Clifton James as Captain Moreno
- Al Avalon as Man Who Picks Up Kelly
- William Bryant as Chuck
- Dick Crockett as FBI agent #1
- James Lanphier as The Landlord
- Warren Hsieh as Joey Soong
- Sidney Miller as Drunk
- Clarence Lung as Attorney Yung
- Frederic Downs as Welk
- Sherry O'Neil as Edna
- Mari Lynn as Penny
- Harvey Evans as Dave
- William Sharon as Raymond Burkhart
- Don Drysdale as Himself

== Production ==
Experiment in Terror was filmed on location in San Francisco. Kelly Sherwood (Lee Remick)'s house is at 100 St. Germain Avenue in the Clarendon Heights district (now demolished). Kelly works at the Crocker-Anglo Bank (now Wells Fargo Bank) located at One Montgomery Street. The climactic chase at the end of the film was filmed at Candlestick Park; other nearby filming locations included Fisherman's Wharf and North Beach.

Herb Stein reported on the film's five weeks of production in the Bay Area. Following the Giants-Dodgers game filming, "Later the picture gang rented Candlestick to shoot reaction in the stands, hired about 1,000 extras from the unemployed here—their take running from $25 to $50 a night. Notwithstanding the fact that Candlestick Park is probably the windiest stadium in the country, the Hollywood company brought its own wind machines from the studios just in case the Giants home grounds disappointed. Also hauled were fog machines, in the event the Twin Peaks locale, famous for its fog, was clear the nights the company planned to shoot….Cost of the location runs to $50,000 a day which, over a five week stretch, adds up."

== Release ==
The film opened in New York on April 13, 1962. The film was originally released in the UK under the title The Grip of Fear.

== Reception ==
Clive Hirschhorn, in his history of Columbia Pictures, criticized the film, writing that director Blake Edwards "gussied up Experiment in Terror with far too many arty, self-conscious, cutely angled shots for his picture's good. The end result was less an experiment in terror than an experiment in lily-gilding."

But the British Film Institute's BFI Companion to Crime found it "a dark and heavily atmospheric suspense thriller" that gets a special chilling effect from a villain who "remains unseen for most of the story except for his dark menacing outline in the shadows..."

Leonard Maltin gave Experiment in Terror three stars (out of four) and praised its "taut suspense... convincing performances... great Henry Mancini score" and "good use of San Francisco locations."

Jonathan Benair, in Film Noir: An Encyclopedic Reference to the American Style, noted the way director Edwards so "effectively utilizes the graceful bridges and leisurely cable cars of San Francisco" and otherwise places "his menace in a sophisticated milieu..." heightening the threat, and "expressing the noir concern that the city is outwardly respectable but inwardly seething with nameless terrors that spring to life when least expected."

On review aggregator Rotten Tomatoes, the film has an approval rating of 100% based on 8 reviews, with an average score of 8.40/10. It has been shown on the Turner Classic Movies show Noir Alley with Eddie Muller.

=== Awards ===
Ross Martin was nominated for a 1963 Golden Globe Award for Best Supporting Actor at the 20th Golden Globe Awards.
