= Daniel M. Cohen =

American writer, producer, and director

Daniel M. Cohen is an American writer, producer, and director. He is the author of the biography Single Handed, about Medal of Honor recipient Tibor Rubin. Cohen wrote, produced and directed the film Diamond Men, starring Robert Forster, Donnie Wahlberg, and Bess Armstrong.

== Selected bibliography ==
- “Single Handed | The Inspiring True Story of Tibor “Teddy Rubin-Holocaust Survivor, Korean War Hero, and Medal of Honor Recipient” (2015) ISBN 978-0-425-27976-2
