= That Darn Cat! =

1965 American thriller comedy film by Robert Stevenson

- Theatrical release poster
- Directed by: Robert Stevenson
- Screenplay by: Gordon Gordon; Mildred Gordon; Bill Walsh
- Based on: Undercover Cat by Gordon Gordon; Mildred Gordon
- Produced by: Walt Disney; Bill Walsh; Ron W. Miller
- Starring: Hayley Mills; Dean Jones; Dorothy Provine; Roddy McDowall; Neville Brand; Elsa Lanchester; William Demarest; Frank Gorshin; Ed Wynn
- Cinematography: Edward Colman
- Edited by: Cotton Warburton
- Music by: Robert F. Brunner
- Production company: Walt Disney Productions
- Distributed by: Buena Vista Distribution
- Release date: December 2, 1965
- Running time: 116 minutes
- Country: United States
- Language: English
- Box office: $28,068,222

That Darn Cat! is a 1965 American thriller comedy film directed by Robert Stevenson and starring Hayley Mills and Dean Jones in a story about bank robbers, a kidnapping and a mischievous cat. Produced by Walt Disney Productions, the film was based on the 1963 novel Undercover Cat by Gordon and Mildred Gordon. The title song was written by the Sherman Brothers and sung by Bobby Darin.

That Darn Cat! was Hayley Mills's last film of the six in which she appeared for the Walt Disney Studios until she returned in 1986 for three Parent Trap films. Mills later said that it was a mistake to leave Disney. It was Dean Jones's first film for Disney. A remake of the film was released in 1997, and it features a cameo appearance by Jones.

== Plot ==
"Darn Cat" or "DC" is a wily, adventurous Siamese tomcat who lives with young suburbanite sisters Ingrid "Inky" and Patricia "Patti" Randall. He enjoys an evening route wandering through town, which includes teasing local dogs, swiping food, and marking vehicles with muddy paws.

One night, DC follows bank robber Iggy into the apartment where Iggy and his partner, Dan, are holding bank employee Margaret Miller hostage. Miss Miller uses the opportunity to replace DC's collar with her watch, on which she has inscribed most of the word "HELP".

DC returns home to the Randalls; Patti discovers the watch, and suspects that it belongs to the kidnapped woman. She goes to the FBI and tells Agent Zeke Kelso of her discovery. Supervisor Newton assigns Kelso to follow DC in the hope that he will lead them back to the robbers' hideout.

Kelso sets up a headquarters in the Randalls' house and assigns a team to keep the cat under surveillance. Despite multiple attempts and a bugging system, DC eludes them in humiliating and comedic ways, culminating in a chase where he leads Agent Kelso through several back yards and a drive-in theatre. As DC ends up trying to open a pigeon cage, he is discovered by the owner, Gregory Benson, who is in Ingrid's carpool and is constantly trying to get her to go out with him. Benson chases DC and Kelso out and angrily announces that he is leaving the carpool.

The next day, agent Kelso's supervisor Newton shuts down the operation, determining the watch not a useful clue. Patti disguises herself as the hippie niece of her friend Mr. A. Hofstedder the jeweler, and persuades the FBI that the watch is indeed hard evidence. Newton and Kelso set up one last surveillance from the Randall home and trail DC through several neighborhoods before finally arriving at the bank robbers' hideout. Kelso enters the apartment just in time to save Miss Miller's life, and Patti enters moments later in an attempt to keep Kelso alive. After a brief scuffle, the kidnappers are arrested and Miss Miller is liberated.

In the epilogue, Patti reconciles with her on-and-off-boyfriend Canoe Henderson, who has suffered with jealousy due to the secretive nature of the FBI investigation. Kelso becomes Ingrid's new carpool and begins a romance with her, much to Gregory's dismay, while DC starts a family with a gray cat that he has been visiting on his nightly rounds.

== Cast ==
- Syn Cat the Siamese cat as D.C. (Darn Cat)
- Hayley Mills as Patricia "Patti" Randall
- Dean Jones as Agent Zeke Kelso
- Dorothy Provine as Ingrid "Inky" Randall
- Roddy McDowall as Gregory Benson
- Neville Brand as Dan
- Frank Gorshin as Iggy
- Elsa Lanchester as Mrs. MacDougall
- William Demarest as Mr. Wilmer MacDougall
- Tom Lowell as Canoe Henderson
- Ed Wynn as Mr. A. Hofstedder
- Richard Eastham as Mr. Newton
- Liam Sullivan as Agent Graham
- Grayson Hall as Miss Margaret Miller
- Iris Adrian as Mrs. Tabin
- Richard Deacon as the drive-in theater manager
- Ben Lessy as Burton the drive-in concessionaire
- Gene Blakely as Cahill
- Don Dorrell as Spires
- Karl Held as Kelton

== Production ==
The exterior neighborhood scenes were filmed on The Walt Disney Studios backlot in Burbank, California.

Each of the Seal Point Siamese cats who collectively play the role of DC is a so-called "traditional" or "old style" Siamese, as opposed to the more dainty, long and tubular modern Siamese show cat. One of the cats used for the film belonged to longtime cat breeder Edith Williams, a member of the Stud Book Fanciers Association. One of the feline actors also starred, along with two dogs, in Disney's 1963 film The Incredible Journey.

== Reception ==
Bosley Crowther of The New York Times wrote: "The feline that plays the informant, as the F.B.I. puts it, is superb. Clark Gable at the peak of his performing never played a tom cat more winningly. This elegant, blue-eyed creature is a paragon of suavity and grace", and concluded, "it's an entertaining picture. Even a king might profitably look at That Darn Cat." Variety said: "Walt Disney comes up with a novelty charmer in this lilting translation of the Gordon's [sic] whimsical tale of a Siamese cat who helps the FBI solve a kidnapping case." Philip K. Scheuer of the Los Angeles Times stated: "As a detective story, That Darn Cat! is strictly for juveniles and the juvenile-minded. It contains little of the step-by-step development which in good detective stories brings out the sleuthing in all of us, being content to settle for a series of gags in which that darn cat, a brownish Siamese, leads the FBI and others on a number of false scents till he and we finally barge in on the criminals." Richard L. Coe of The Washington Post declared: "That Darn Cat is a dandy Christmas present for everyone except the Scrooges. Children will enjoy its pranks, adults its whimsy, cat-lovers its Siamese and even J. Edgar Hoover won't mind this use of the FBI." Brendan Gill of The New Yorker called the film "a typical product of the giant Disney flapdoodle factory, which for many years now has devoted itself to grinding out lavish falsifications of contemporary life."

In September 1965, Hedda Hopper reported that Disney had commissioned a sequel from the Gordons entitled Undercover Cat Prowls Again but it was not made.

The film holds a 94% rating on Rotten Tomatoes based on 16 reviews.

== Awards and nominations ==
The film's writers, Mildred Gordon, Gordon Gordon, and Bill Walsh, were nominated for the Writers Guild of America Award for Best Written Comedy at the 18th Writers Guild of America Awards. The film was also nominated for an Edgar Allan Poe Award for Best Motion Picture Screenplay, and a Golden Leaf nomination for Best Supporting Actress (Elsa Lanchester). Hayley Mills won the 1966 second-place Golden Leaf Award for Comedy Performance, Actress. The Sherman Brothers won the third-place Golden Leaf award for Best Song.

== Comic book adaptation ==
- Gold Key: That Darn Cat (February 1966)

== See also ==
- List of American films of 1965
