= Undercover Cat =

1963 novel by Gordon and Mildred Gordon

- First edition
- Author: Gordon Gordon; Mildred Gordon
- Language: English
- Publisher: The Crime Club
- Publication date: 1963
- Publication place: United States
- Media type: Hardcover
- Pages: 180
- ISBN: 978-9997411846
- Preceded by: Undercover Cat Prowls Again
- Followed by: Catnapped! The Further Adventures of Undercover Cat

Undercover Cat is a novel by Gordon and Mildred Gordon, about a cat who assists the FBI in tracking down a pair of bank robbers. It was first published in 1963 by The Crime Club a subsidiary of Doubleday.

It has been adapted to a live-action Disney film twice, as That Darn Cat! (1965) and That Darn Cat (1997).

Two sequels were written by the Gordons: Undercover Cat Prowls Again (Doubleday, 1966) and Catnapped! The Further Adventures of Undercover Cat (Doubleday, 1974).

== Plot summary ==
Damn Cat or DC, is in the habit of prowling the neighborhood at night and stealing food from a neighbour named Greg. His owners, Patti and Ingrid Randall (also known as Inky) look after him while their parents are away on holiday.

One night DC returns home with a wristwatch round his neck. Patti determines that the watch belongs to a bank teller, Helen Jenkins, who was kidnapped by two bank robbers.

One day DC discovers a duck Greg has caught and takes it away to eat, much to the agitation of Greg, who says that if DC takes anything else from him he'll shoot him.

Zeke Kelso, an FBI agent, puts surveillance on the cat in the hope he will lead them to the kidnappers. Zeke has a cat allergy, which makes it difficult for DC to like him. Zeke gets DC's paw prints on ink for evidence. They are both helped and hampered by Patti, Ingrid and their neighbors. The FBI keep an eye on where DC travels to see if he goes back to the bank robbers' lair, but with little success at first.

Jenkins tries to find ways of escaping, which is difficult because Sammy and Dan, the robbers, live in an apartment building, and keep the radio and air conditioning on so that if she screams it'll be muffled. One night she creates a fire to get help, but the robbers stop her in time. One evening, while tracking DC, Zeke and the neighbours hear a gunshot. Patti confronts Greg, who she suspects trying to kill DC, but he explains that he was not trying to shoot DC, but rather fired because he saw a man on his property.

On the final evening DC, with Zeke tracking him, finally reaches the apartment building where the criminals are holding Jenkins hostage. Zeke confronts Dan and Sammy, who recall the time DC came around. Seeing that Dan and Sammy are the criminals he's looking for, Zeke throws DC at them as a diversion and arrests them.

The next day DC is all over the papers as the spotlight of the news, and people are gathering round his house wanting his autograph. Not caring about being famous, DC remains on his usual routine, prowling the streets and tailing Greg.

== Characters ==
- "Damn Cat/DC": A black cat who prowls around his city and steals food from Greg. The character is based on the authors' black cat Pancho.
- Patti Randall: Owner of DC and gets suspicious when DC comes home wearing a wristwatch.
- Ingrid "Inky" Randall: Patti's sister who has no interest in the bank robber case.
- Sammy: One of the bank robbers who has an interest in cats.
- Dan: The other bank robber who keeps Helen Jenkins hostage.
- Helen Jenkins: The banker who gets kidnapped by the bank robbers and puts the wristwatch around DC's neck.
- Greg: Patti and Ingrid's neighbour who bears a grudge for DC for stealing his Gadwall duck. He is later accused for trying to shoot DC in the neighbourhood.
- Zeke Kelso: The FBI Agent whose job is to solve the banker kidnapper case. It is explained that he has a cat allergy which makes it awkward for him to interact with DC.

== See also ==
- Fred the Undercover Kitty
