= The Gordons (writers) =

American writers

The Gordons were crime fiction authors Gordon Gordon (born March 12, 1906, Anderson, Indiana – died March 14, 2002), and his wife, Mildred Nixon Gordon (born June 24, 1912, Kansas – died February 3, 1979, Tucson, Arizona). Both attended the University of Arizona where they met and later married in 1932. They wrote numerous crime fiction novels, some of which were filmed.

Many of these feature fictional protagonist FBI agent John "Rip" Ripley (as noted below). After they learned that the screenwriter of Make Haste to Live received $40,000 while they, the authors, only received $5,000, the Gordons insisted on writing the screenplays for their books being filmed. Gordon was an editor of the Tucson Citizen newspaper and a publicist with 20th Century Fox from 1935 to 1942, and later served as a Federal Bureau of Investigation counter-intelligence agent during World War II for three years.

Mildred Gordon was a teacher and an editor for Arizona Highways magazine. She worked for United Press and wrote The Little Man Who Wasn't There (1946). Mildred can be heard as a contestant on the 21st March 1951 edition of You Bet Your Life.

After Mildred's death in 1979, Gordon married Mary Dorr (1918–2004) on March 16, 1980. They wrote Race for the Golden Tide (1983) and The Hong Kong Affair (1998). Gordon and Dorr created the Excellence in Media Angel Awards.

== Major works ==
- Make Haste to Live (1950; filmed in 1954)
- FBI Story (1950; John Ripley)
- Campaign Train (1952)
- Case File: FBI (1953; John Ripley; also collaborated on the screenplay with Bernard C. Schoenfeld when filmed as Down Three Dark Streets in 1954)
- The Case of the Talking Bug/Playback (title in UK; 1955)
- The Big Frame (1957)
- Captive (1957; John Ripley)
- Tiger on My Back (1960)
- Operation Terror (1961; John Ripley; also wrote the screenplay when filmed as Experiment in Terror in 1962)
- Menace (1962)
- Undercover Cat (1963; also wrote the screenplay when filmed as That Darn Cat! in 1965)
- The Informant (1973; John Ripley – later reprinted under the title It Could Happen)
- That Darn Cat (1973; reprint of Undercover Cat with the movie title)
