= Jim Mathers =

American actor

- Born: James Mathers; May 5, 1955 (age 71); Los Angeles, California, U.S.
- Occupations: actor, cinematographer, director of photography

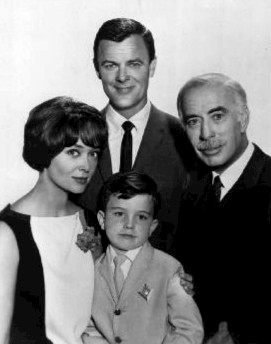
Clockwise from top: Robert Sterling, George Chandler, Jimmy Mathers, and Christine White in TV's Ichabod and Me (1961)

James Mathers (born May 5, 1955) is an American cinematographer and former child actor. He is the younger brother of Jerry Mathers, who is known for his title role in Leave It to Beaver.

== Biography ==
Mathers was born in Los Angeles, California, and appeared under the name "Jimmy Mathers" in several TV and film productions between 1961 and 1968. He is best known for his recurring role in Ichabod and Me playing Benjie Major, the young son of Bob Major, who just purchased a small-town newspaper.

He attended film school and held various staff and freelance roles in film production, eventually specializing in cinematography. He founded two film production companies, The Migrant FilmWorkers and Jim Mathers Film Company.

Mathers has served as the director of photography on over 30 feature and made-for-TV films and has been involved with six TV series from inception through their first season. He is the president and co-founder of the nonprofit educational cooperative "The Digital Cinema Society," a group dedicated to the industry's informed integration of new technology.

== Acting career ==
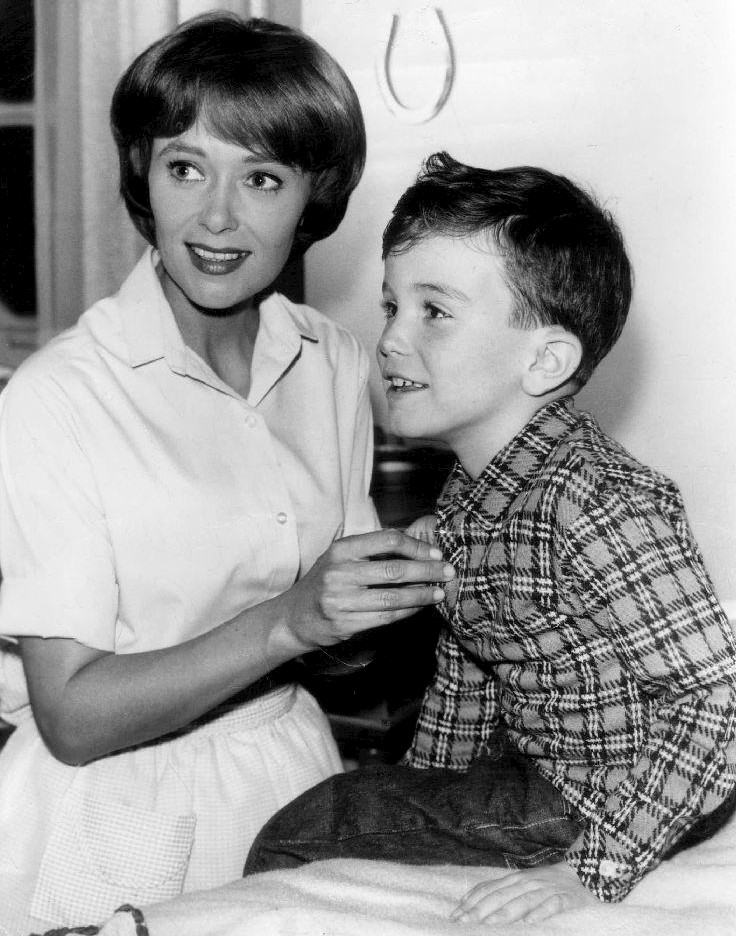
Mathers as Benjie Major with Christine White in the Ichabod and Me episode, "Benjie's Spots".

- The Darkness .... Edward "Eddie" Shrote / ... (Video game, 2007)
- Adam-12 .... (2 episodes, 1968)

- Log 61: The Runaway .... Rick
- Log 161: And You Want Me to Get Married? ... Jimmy D'Angelo

- My Three Sons .... Norman (1 episode, 1966)

- The State vs. Chip Douglas

- O.K. Crackerby! .... Eddie Malone (1 episode, 1965)

- The Griffin Story

- The Munsters .... The 2nd Boy (1 episode, 1965)

- Bats of a Feather

- Bewitched .... Marshall Burns (1 episode, 1964)

- "Little Pitchers Have Big Fears"

- The New Interns (1964) .... Freddie
- Mail Order Bride (1964) .... Matt Boley
- Wagon Train .... Oldest Hooper Orphan (Season 6, episode 26, 1963)

- "The Michael McGoo Story"

- Summer Magic (1963) .... Peter Carey
- Ichabod and Me .... Benjie Major (8 episodes)

- Tuttle's Wall (1961)
- The Printer (1961)
- Benjie's Spots (1961)
- Teenage Journalist (1961)
- My Friend Lippy (1962)
- The Phipps Papers (1962)
- Benjie's Indian (1962)
- Benjie's Pageant (1962)
