= William Shatner seat =

Aircraft window seat with best wing view

The William Shatner seat is an informal name used by airline crew and travel writers for the passenger window seats next to the small black or red triangle markers fixed to the interior wall of an aircraft cabin. The markers indicate the windows with the clearest view of the wing, which cabin crew use to inspect the wing surfaces and, in cold weather, to check for ice. The nickname alludes to the actor William Shatner, whose character in the 1963 Twilight Zone episode "Nightmare at 20,000 Feet" sees a creature on the wing from such a seat.

Most aircraft cabins carry one or two small triangles, usually black or red, fixed to the wall above a window on each side, aligned with the edges of the wing. When cabin crew or pilots need to look at the wing, for example to check the flaps and slats or to confirm that de-icing has worked, the markers point them to the windows with the best sightline without having to move along the cabin. Passengers seated by the markers have no special duties, unlike those in exit rows. The crew can look out of these windows to make sure the wing is being de-iced and that there are no abnormalities.
