= Treehouse of Horror IV =

- The Simpsons episode
- The Devil, in the form of Ned Flanders, appearing at Homer's work station after he says that he would sell his soul for a donut.
- Episode no.: Season 5 Episode 5
- Directed by: David Silverman
- Written by: Wraparounds: Conan O'Brien; "The Devil and Homer Simpson": Greg Daniels; Dan McGrath; "Terror at 5 1/2 Feet": Bill Oakley; Josh Weinstein; "Bart Simpson's Dracula": Bill Canterbury
- Production code: 1F04
- Original air date: October 28, 1993

Guest appearances
- Phil Hartman as Lionel Hutz; Frank Welker as the gremlin

Episode features
- Couch gag: The family (as zombies) enter through the living room floor before sitting on the couch.
- Commentary: Matt Groening; James L. Brooks; David Mirkin; Conan O'Brien; Greg Daniels; Bill Oakley; Josh Weinstein; David Silverman

Episode chronology
← Previous "Rosebud"	Next → "Marge on the Lam"
- The Simpsons season 5

"Treehouse of Horror IV" is the fifth episode of the fifth season of the American animated television series The Simpsons and the fourth episode in the Treehouse of Horror series of Halloween specials. It originally aired on the Fox network in the United States on October 28, 1993, and features three short stories called "The Devil and Homer Simpson", "Terror at 5 1/2 Feet", and "Bart Simpson's Dracula".

The episode was co-written by Conan O'Brien, Bill Oakley, Josh Weinstein, Greg Daniels, Dan McGrath, and Bill Canterbury, and directed by David Silverman. As with the rest of the Halloween specials, the episode is considered non-canon and falls outside the show's regular continuity. The episode makes cultural references to television series such as The Twilight Zone, Night Gallery, and Peanuts, as well as films such as The Devil and Daniel Webster, Bram Stoker's Dracula and The Lost Boys. Since airing, the episode has received mostly positive reviews from television critics. It acquired a Nielsen rating of 14.5, and was the highest-rated show on the Fox network the week it aired.

== Plot ==
In the wraparound, Bart introduces each of the three segments by walking through a gallery of paintings and each time choosing one of them as the focus of his story.

=== "The Devil and Homer Simpson" ===
In "The Devil and Homer Simpson", Homer sells his soul to the devil, who takes the form of Ned Flanders, for a donut. After Marge and Lisa plead with Ned, he agrees to put Homer on trial. At the trial, Marge saves Homer from being sent to Hell by displaying a photo from their wedding day. On the back of the photo, Homer has written that, in return for Marge giving him her hand in marriage, he pledges his soul to her forever; therefore, it was not his property to sell at the time of his deal with Ned. The case is dismissed, and Ned frees Homer, but Ned gets his revenge by turning Homer's head into a donut.

=== "Terror at 5 1/2 Feet" ===
In "Terror at 5 1/2 Feet", Bart tries to warn the passengers on the school bus that a gremlin is loosening the lug nuts on one of the wheels, but nobody can see the gremlin. In desperation, Bart climbs halfway out the window to scare off the gremlin with an emergency flare. As Bart is pulled back into the bus by Principal Skinner and Groundskeeper Willie, he drops the flare on the gremlin, who catches fire and falls from the bus, but is found by Ned. Even though everyone sees the damage when they make it to school, Bart is sent to a psychiatric hospital for his disruptive behavior. Bart is relieved as he is finally able to rest, but is once again petrified when the gremlin appears in the back window of the ambulance, holding Ned's severed head.

=== "Bart Simpson's Dracula" ===
In "Bart Simpson's Dracula", the Simpson family is invited to Mr. Burns' castle in Pennsylvania for a midnight feast. Bart and Lisa discover a secret staircase descending to a basement with coffins. Vampires emerge from the coffins and encircle them while Lisa reads through Burns' autobiography Yes, I Am a Vampire. Lisa escapes and tries to warn her parents that Burns has bitten Bart, but Homer and Marge pay little attention until Bart tries to bite Lisa later that night. Homer drives a stake through Burns' heart, and kills him, as Lisa believes doing so will restore Bart. The next morning, Lisa discovers that everyone else in the Simpson family is a vampire, and Marge is their leader. The family breaks the fourth wall and wishes the audience a happy Halloween. Parodying A Charlie Brown Christmas, they then begin humming "Hark! The Herald Angels Sing", with Milhouse playing the toy piano and Santa's Little Helper dancing on top of it.

== Credits ==
In all Treehouse of Horror shows, the names on the credits include middle name nicknames, in quotation marks, which reflect some association with Halloween or horror.

Conan O'Brien's credits all reference his new role as host of Late Night with Conan O'Brien, including a credit that says "Watch Conan O'Brien" and another which says "12:30 NBC" as his "middle" name. O'Brien had just begun his tenure on September 13, 1993, roughly a month before the 1993 Treehouse of Horror episode aired.

== Production ==
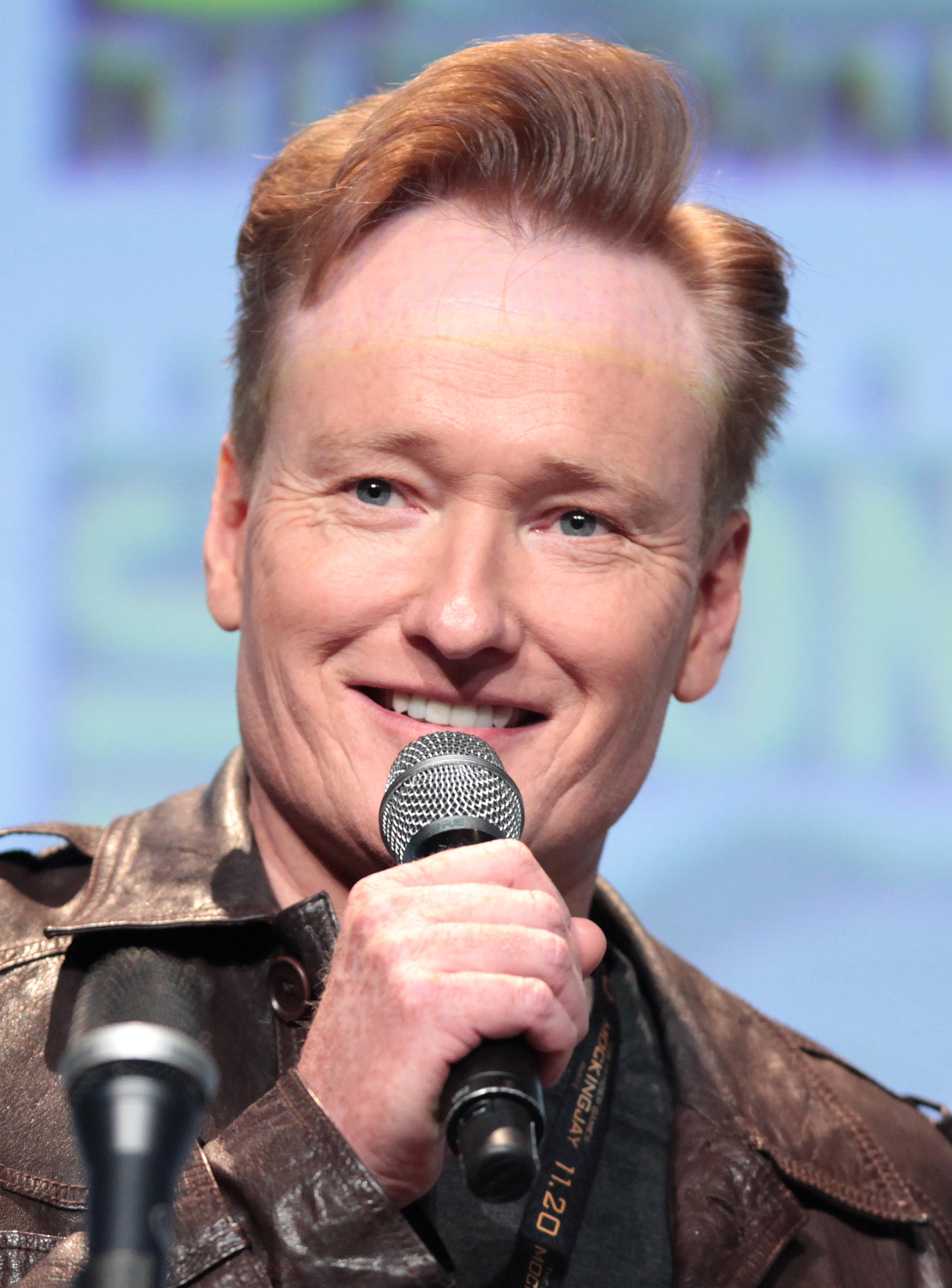
Conan O'Brien was one of the writers of the episode.

"Treehouse of Horror IV" was directed by David Silverman and co-written by Conan O'Brien (his final assignment for The Simpsons; by the time this episode aired, his brand-new late night show on NBC had been on for a little over a month), Bill Oakley, Josh Weinstein, Greg Daniels, Dan McGrath, and Bill Canterbury. O'Brien worked on the "wrap-arounds" of Bart introducing each segment to make sure that they "pulled" the episode together. The wrap-arounds are based on Rod Serling's television series Night Gallery, in which Serling appears at an art gallery and introduces each episode by unveiling paintings depicting the stories. Executive producer James L. Brooks loved the show, so it was "great fun" for him to do the parody. Show runner David Mirkin thought the Treehouse of Horror episodes were the hardest episodes to do because the staff had to fit in all three stories in only 22 minutes. Mirkin said, "Things had to happen really fast. They're really just crammed with jokes and story beats and everything."

"The Devil and Homer Simpson" was written by Daniels and McGrath. Oakley loved the idea of Flanders being the Devil because he was the character whom viewers would least expect. He also thought Harry Shearer did a good job of playing Flanders in a much darker way, while remaining very true to the character. Many scenes had to be cut to shorten the segment, including one that showed Homer's severed head being used as a bowling ball by a demon in hell. This scene later appeared in the clip show episode "The Simpsons 138th Episode Spectacular", which aired in the show's seventh season.

"Terror at 5 1/2 Feet" was written by Oakley and Weinstein. It was inspired by The Twilight Zone episode "Nightmare at 20,000 Feet", in which William Shatner's character is inside an airplane watching a gremlin tear apart the wing. Silverman watched the episode to get inspiration for Bart's facial expressions. Oakley said there was a lot of work put into the design of the gremlin in "Terror at 5 1/2 Feet" to make him scary "within The Simpsons universe". Mirkin said he felt the gremlin was well-done because he looked scary and "yet it looks like a completely organic Simpsons character". Üter, a German exchange student, makes his first appearance in this segment; he was conceived as a one-time joke, but reappeared in later episodes because Mirkin felt he was "such a perfect stereotype".

"Bart Simpson's Dracula" was written by Canterbury and based on Francis Ford Coppola's film Bram Stoker's Dracula. Mirkin was a big fan of the film and pushed for a segment inspired by it. He liked the final result and felt Mr. Burns was perfect in the role of Dracula. Dracula and his castle were designed by Silverman. Mirkin, a "big" Peanuts fan, came up with the idea for the ending of "Bart Simpson's Dracula".

== Cultural references ==
The wrap-around segments are a reference to Rod Serling's Night Gallery. The paintings seen in these segments are parodies of well-known works, including van Gogh's Self-Portrait, September 1889, Munch's The Scream, Magritte's The Son of Man, David's The Death of Marat, Dalí's The Persistence of Memory, Picasso's Three Musicians, and Escher's Ascending and Descending, all featuring members of the Simpson family. (The last painting, shown before "Bart Simpson's Dracula", is Dogs Playing Poker.) Marge says that the following episode is scary, and that maybe viewers should listen to the War of the Worlds broadcast instead.

"The Devil and Homer Simpson" is a parody of Stephen Vincent Benét's story "The Devil and Daniel Webster". After Homer initially outsmarts the Devil, the latter morphs into a form resembling Chernabog, the demon from Fantasia. David Silverman particularly admired the animation during this sequence. The scene in Hell where Homer is fed all the doughnuts in the world, and asks for more, is a direct parody of the Merrie Melodies cartoon Pigs is Pigs, in which the character Piggy is taken in by a mad scientist and force-fed food to his ironic glee. The demon who feeds Homer all the donuts in the world says: "I don't understand it. James Coco went mad in fifteen minutes!" Coco was an actor known for his culinary talents and best-selling cookbooks. The "jury of the damned" includes John Wilkes Booth, Lizzie Borden, John Dillinger, Blackbeard, Benedict Arnold, Richard Nixon (who points out that he is not yet dead) (Note: In real life, Nixon died 5 months after this episode aired.) and the starting lineup of the 1976 Philadelphia Flyers, a reference to their days as the Broad Street Bullies, when they were notorious for their violent playing style.

"Terror at 5 1/2 Feet" is a parody of The Twilight Zone episode "Nightmare at 20,000 Feet", later remade as the final segment of Twilight Zone: The Movie. In the school bus, Martin wears a shirt reading Wang Computers. Bart tells Otto there's a gremlin on the side of the bus. Hans Moleman is beside the bus driving an AMC Gremlin. Otto, assuming this is what he's referring to, says "No problemo, Bart dude!" and runs Moleman off the road.

"Bart Simpson's Dracula" is a parody of Francis Ford Coppola's Bram Stoker's Dracula. At Burns' castle, Lisa notices a tome resting on a stand in the basement: Yes, I Am a Vampire, by Monty Burns. Foreword by Steve Allen. Shortly after she finds the tome, she mistakes Bart's fearful attempts at getting her attention as impressions of Shemp and Curly Howard of the Three Stooges. Bart floating outside Lisa's bedroom window is a parody of The Lost Boys as well as Stephen King's novel Salem's Lot. The family's plan to kill the head vampire is also a reference to both the film and novel. In particular, the twist revelation that Burns is not the head vampire is also a reference to the twist ending of The Lost Boys. The segment ends with the family singing "Hark! The Herald Angels Sing" à la A Charlie Brown Christmas.

Alf Clausen's closing credits composition is a version of the Simpsons theme that combines the electric guitar used in The Munsters theme with the harpsichord and clicking from The Addams Family theme.

== Reception ==
In its original American broadcast, "Treehouse of Horror IV" finished 17th in the ratings for the week of October 25 to October 31, 1993, with a Nielsen rating of 14.5, translating to 13.6 million households. The episode was the highest-rated show on the Fox network that week.

Since airing, the episode has received mostly positive reviews from television critics. The authors of the book I Can't Believe It's a Bigger and Better Updated Unofficial Simpsons Guide, Gary Russell and Gareth Roberts, said the episode included many notable sequences and was "probably the best" Treehouse of Horror episode. They particularly liked the scenes in Hell where Homer is punished by the Devil, and Chief Wiggum's attempts to deal with Dracula (who he thinks is a mummy) by ordering the Egyptian wing of the Springfield museum to be destroyed. DVD Movie Guide's Colin Jacobson thought "Terror at 5 1/2 Feet" was the best segment of the episode. Jacobson praised "The Devil and Homer Simpson" as clever funny, and described "Bart Simpson's Dracula" as "easily the least effective", claiming it, "presents some good moments but never quite takes flight". Patrick Bromley of DVD Verdict gave the episode an A grade and called it "one of the very best" Halloween specials, although said "Treehouse of Horror V" was better. Central Michigan Life's John Thorpe named it the tenth best episode of the series, and wrote: "The best part comes when Homer decides not to eat the last part of the doughnut, thus saving him from hell. Hilarious." DVD Talk's Bill Gibron gave the episode a 4 out of 5 score.

Kim Nowacki of Yakima Herald-Republic named "Treehouse of Horror IV" her "all-time favorite" episode. She praised the parodies of The Twilight Zone and A Charlie Brown Christmas. The episode's reference to Bram Stoker's Dracula was named the 32nd greatest film reference in the history of the show by Total Film's Nathan Ditum. James Whitbrook of Gizmodo called "Bart Simpson's Dracula" the "best sketch in what is the best Treehouse of Horror."
