= Ichabod and Me =

1960s American sitcom

- Created by: Joe Connelly; Bob Mosher
- Starring: Robert Sterling; George Chandler; Reta Shaw; Jimmy Hawkins; Burt Mustin; Forrest Lewis; Christine White; Jimmy Mathers
- Opening theme: "The Girl I Left Behind Me", performed by Pete Rugolo and His Orchestra
- Ending theme: "The Girl I Left Behind Me", performed by Pete Rugolo and His Orchestra
- Composer: Traditional
- Country of origin: United States
- Original language: English
- No. of seasons: 1
- No. of episodes: 36

Production
- Executive producers: Joe Connelly; Bob Mosher
- Producer: Irving Paley
- Running time: 30 minutes
- Production companies: JaMco Productions; Kayro Productions; Revue Studios

Original release
- Network: CBS
- Release: September 26, 1961 – June 5, 1962

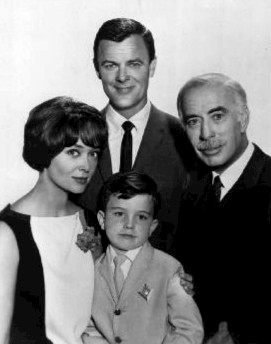
Clockwise from top: Robert Sterling, George Chandler, Jimmy Mathers, and Christine White in a promotional photo for Ichabod and Me.

Ichabod and Me is an American sitcom television series starring Robert Sterling and George Chandler that aired in the United States during the 1961–62 television season. It depicts the life of a New York City newspaper reporter who moves to a small New England town and becomes the publisher of its newspaper.

== Premise ==
Tiring of life in New York City, where he had worked as a reporter at the New York Times, and wanting to raise his six-year-old son Benjie in a different environment, 44-year-old widower Bob Major moves with Benjie to Phippsboro, a small, sleepy rural town in New Hampshire with a population of about 3,000, where he purchases the town's only newspaper, the weekly Phippsboro Bulletin, from its longtime owner and editor, Ichabod Adams. Bob's big-city attitudes and ideas often clash with the small-town ways of the natives of Phippsboro, who are stereotypical rural New Englanders – taciturn, frugal, suspicious of strangers like him, and set in their ways; he is prone to writing inflammatory editorials in the Bulletin calling for progress in the town to bring it into the mid-20th century and raising the ire of the townspeople, who tend to oppose change. Ichabod – who is in his 60s, owns most of the town and serves it in many capacities, including as its mayor for the past 28 years, its school superintendent, and its traffic commissioner — remains involved in the operation of the newspaper. Ichabod is bemused by Bob and friendly toward him, offering him fatherly wisdom and advising him on how to navigate conflicts with his neighbors.

Also in Bob's life in Phippsboro are Ichabod's adult daughter Abby, who lives with Ichabod and at first views the highly eligible Bob with disdain, but then warms to him, takes a romantic interest in him, and eventually becomes his girlfriend; Aunt Livvy, the stern-faced but soft-hearted housekeeper for Bob and Benjie; Jonathan Baylor, a wide-eyed high school student who is Bob's only regular employee at the Phippsboro Bulletin; and Olaf, one of the townspeople. Martin Perkins, a typically taciturn New Englander who runs the local hardware store, and his friend Colby, the owner and operator of Colby's Seed and Fertilizer, are longtime Phippsboro residents who serve on the city council and share a suspicion of Bob and his activities. Bob complains about how hard it is to keep a secret in Phippsboro, where residents – Martin and Colby in particular – listen in on the town's party line to eavesdrop on other people's business.

== Cast ==
=== Main ===
- Robert Sterling as Robert "Bob" Major
- George Chandler as Ichabod Adams
- Christine White as Abigail "Abby" Adams

=== Recurring ===
- Jimmy Mathers as Benjamin "Benjie" Major
- Reta Shaw as Aunt Lavinia ("Livvy")
- Guy Raymond as Martin Perkins
- Forrest Lewis as Colby
- Jimmy Hawkins as Jonathan Baylor
- Burt Mustin as Olaf

The pilot, "Adam's Apples", aired in 1960, had a somewhat different cast. Fred Beir played Terrence "Terry" Major, later recast and renamed Bob Major for the actual series. Dorothy Neumann played Aunt Lavinia ("Livvy"), and Pitt Herbert played Martin Perkins. Burt Mustin, who played the recurring role of Olaf in the series, played a character called Burt in the pilot. Chandler and White appeared in the pilot in their series roles.

== Origins ==
George Chandler created the Ichabod Adams character in 1956 in "Goodbye, Grey Flannel," an episode of the dramatic series Robert Montgomery Presents, with Lee Bowman co-starring as "Mr. Major", a forerunner of the Bob Major character of Ichabod and Me. The success of the episode prompted Chandler to return as Ichabod in a 1957 episode of Robert Montgomery Presents entitled "One Smart Apple."

The two Robert Montgomery Presents episodes led to the filming of a pilot for Ichabod and Me entitled "Adam's Apples." It included George Chandler as Ichabod and Christine White as his daughter Abby, but differed from the regular series in several ways. In "Adam's Apples," a character named Terrence "Terry" Major, portrayed by Fred Beir, gives up life as an advertising executive in New York City and retires to Phippsboro to become a gentleman farmer, and he rents property from Ichabod. Terry is childless, but has a dog named Fownes, after his former boss in New York. Dorothy Neumann portrays Livvy, Pitt Herbert portrays Martin Perkins, and Burt Mustin appears as a character named Burt rather than Olaf. The pilot does not include the Jonathan Baylor, Benjie Major, or Colby characters and makes no mention of Phippsboro's newspaper. It aired in April 1960 as an episode of General Electric Theater but did not sell as a regular series.

Despite the pilot's failure, Chandler felt strongly about getting a regular series on the air based on the Ichabod Adams and "Mr. Major" characters. He took the initiative in forming a partnership with co-creators Joe Connelly and Bob Mosher and with comedian Jack Benny, whose production company put up much of the funding for the regular series Ichabod and Me. The show's premise was retooled for the regular series, with a character named Bob Major giving up life as a newspaper reporter in New York and moving to Phippsboro with his son Benjie, where he purchases the local newspaper from Ichabod, with Robert Sterling rather than Beir playing the role of Bob. With the success of The Andy Griffith Show, a rural-themed CBS situation comedy which began its long and successful run during the 1960–1961 season, and the planned premiere on CBS in the 1961–1962 season of Window on Main Street starring Robert Young — which some observers viewed as bearing similarities to Ichabod and Me — CBS saw a potentially successful series in Ichabod and Me and picked it up for its 1961–1962 schedule.

== Production ==
A low-key situation comedy, Ichabod and Me was created and produced by Joe Connelly and Bob Mosher — who served as its executive producers – in association with Jack Benny's JaMco Productions, and Irving Paley served as series producer. It was co-sponsored by the Quaker Oats Company and the Kent and York Imperial-Sized Cigarette brands of the P. Lorillard Tobacco Company.

Both the pilot and the regular series were filmed at Revue Studios in Hollywood, California. The show was in black and white with a laugh track. Hank Simms was the show's announcer.

Pete Rugolo and His Orchestra performed the opening and closing theme of Ichabod and Me, which was an updated, up-tempo arrangement of the traditional folk song "The Girl I Left Behind Me" — a fife-and-drum-corps classic which connoted the American Revolutionary War era in New England. It appeared with the title "Ichabod and Me Theme" as a track on Rugolo's 1962 album TV's Top Themes.

Jimmy Mathers, who portrayed Benjie Major, was the brother of Jerry Mathers, who starred in Leave It to Beaver at the time. However, the Benjie and Livvy roles were rather minor ones in Ichabod and Me, and the two characters did not even appear in a number of episodes.

Ichabod and Me′s most noteworthy guest star was screenwriter, playwright, television producer, narrator, and television host Rod Serling, who had gained fame in the 1950s for his live television dramas and as creator of the anthology series The Twilight Zone, which had debuted in 1959. He portrayed a reclusive counterculture novelist in the episode "The Celebrity," which aired on March 20, 1962, in what CBS billed as his dramatic debut. Uncomfortable with acting, Serling said of his appearance on Ichabod and Me, "I never had a line that resembled the English language."

== Reception ==
The Red Skelton Show drew high ratings and appealed especially to rural audiences, and CBS hoped it would provide a good lead-in for Ichabod and Me, so it scheduled Ichabod and Me to follow The Red Skelton Show. Ichabod and Me met with poor critical reviews that suggested such scheduling would not succeed in building an audience for the series. In her column of September 27, 1961, Associated Press television critic Cynthia Lowry wrote that Ichabod and Me amounted to a "pretty tired, clumsy effort" and offered the opinion that its stereotyped depiction of rural New Englanders was more likely to offend residents of New England than attract them to the show. The same day, syndicated columnist Harriet Van Horne wrote of CBS that "A network that would buy Ichabod for prime evening time would buy the Brooklyn Bridge from a tavern drunk — and pay cash." Variety panned Ichabod and Me in its October 4, 1961, issue as "just another run-of-the-mill situation comedy, typically innocuous in its content and wholly bland in its approach...there were no surprises and few laughs on its first outing."

Ichabod and Me struggled to attract an audience. Rod Serling's guest appearance drew some attention to the series in March 1962, but did not improve its ratings, and by April 1962 Robert Sterling was acknowledging in interviews that the show was unlikely to return for a second season. He expressed bewilderment at the rules of television, likened an actor's selection of a television role to little more than gambling, with success having nothing to do with the role's quality, and criticized sponsors for becoming too prone to withdraw support for a television series at the first sign of early weakness in viewership. Disgusted with the television industry after the cancellation of Ichabod and Me, Sterling made only sporadic television appearances after the series came to an end in mid-1962.

== Broadcast history ==
The pilot for Ichabod and Me aired on April 24, 1960, as an episode of General Electric Theater entitled "Adam's Apples." Ichabod and Me premiered as a regular series on September 26, 1961, and aired on CBS on Tuesdays at 9:30 p.m. Eastern Time. The competition for Ichabod and Me was not considered formidable: It consisted of the second half of the Leslie Nielsen police drama The New Breed on ABC until November 14, 1961, when The New Breed moved to 8:30 pm. Eastern Time and Bert Parks's game show Yours for a Song began airing at 9:30 pm. Eastern on ABC, while on NBC Ichabod and Me aired opposite the second half of The Dick Powell Show, an anthology series. However, CBS cancelled Ichabod and Me after only a single season, and its 36th and final new episode was broadcast on June 5, 1962. Reruns of the show then aired in its regular time slot until September 18, 1962.

== Episodes ==
=== Pilot (1960) ===
Title	Directed by	Written by	Original release date
"Adam's Apples"	Herschel Daugherty	George Tibbles & J. Harvey Howells	April 24, 1960
The pilot for Ichabod and Me, broadcast as an episode of General Electric Theater. When bright young advertising executive Terrance "Terry" Major moves from New York City to a rural New England community to take up the life of a farmer, he rents a property from the determined Ichabod Adams. A battle of wits over a business deal ensues between Terry and Ichabod, resulting in Ichabod getting Terry to do all the work in the apple orchard. Meanwhile, Terry's former boss, Mr. Fownes – after whom Terry named his bulldog "Fownes" because of their mutual resemblance – tries to get Terry to return to his old job in New York. Fred Beir portrayed Terry Major; Robert Sterling replaced him as the character Bob Major in the regular series. Also starring Leon Ames, Edward Marr, Ann Doran, Pitt Herbert, and Dorothy Neumann.

=== Season 1 (1962–63) ===
No.	Title	Directed by	Written by	Original release date
1	"Bob's Boat"	Sidney Lanfield	Joe Connelly & Bob Mosher	September 26, 1961
When Martin sells Bob a small sailboat commonly known as Flippin' Maude, Bob discovers that the boat will not stay upright and soon decides that he's been had. Guest stars: George Spicer and Sherwood Keith.
2	"Tuttle's Wall"	Unknown	Unknown	October 3, 1961
When Bob proposes dismantling a rock wall, he meets fierce resistance from the townspeople, who claim it has historical significance.
3	"A Letter from Juliet"	Unknown	Unknown	October 10, 1961
Responding to a girl's letter to the Phippsboro Bulletin′s advice column "Dear Debby," Bob advises a young couple to elope – and when Horace Cheever, the girl's father, storms into the newspaper office in a rage, Bob has to try to get out of trouble by blaming the advice on the imaginary Debby.
4	"Firefighters"	Unknown	Calvin Clements Sr.	October 17, 1961
Bob launches a newspaper investigation into the efficiency of the Phippsboro fire department — and finds it sadly lacking.
5	"The Phippsboro Story"	Unknown	Unknown	October 24, 1961
Bob persuades a national magazine to do an article about the "typical New Englanders" of Phippsboro. Guest stars: Mari Aldon, Arthur Franz, and Paul Barselow.
6	"The Purple Cow"	Unknown	Raphael Blau & Gene L. Coon	October 31, 1961
Bob discovers Mehitabel Hobbs, an elderly painter who he believes is so talented that she could be the next Grandma Moses, and writes a story about her in the Phippsboro Bulletin — but Mehitabel dislikes publicity, and she threatens to sue Bob if his story makes her rich and famous. Guest stars: Margaret Hamilton, John Abbott, and Laurie Main.
7	"Whose Ewe?"	Unknown	Unknown	November 7, 1961
Benjie finds a week-old lamb and nurses it back to health – and when farmer Caleb Crawford claims ownership of the animal, Benjie insists that the lamb is now his due to their mutual affection.
8	"Summer Theater"	Unknown	Unknown	November 14, 1961
When a New York City stage star walks out on a summer stock theater production in Phippsboro, Abby replaces her.
9	"The Printer"	Sidney Lanfield	Story by : Gene L. Coon; Teleplay by : Bob Ross	November 21, 1961
After Bob unwittingly hires a printer with a drinking problem, he sets out to reform him.
10	"Ichabod's Romance"	Unknown	Unknown	November 28, 1961
Bob hopes to improve the lives of the residents of Phippsboro by making the town's banker, Samuel Cheever, less ornery by getting him to marry Miss Prouty. Guest stars: Russell Collins and Linda Watkins.
11	"The Barter System"	Norman Abbott	Story by : Don Stanford; Teleplay by : Bob Ross	December 5, 1961
Fed up with delinquent accounts among the Phippsboro Bulletin′s subscribers and needing the more than $600 they owe to keep the newspaper in business, Bob decides he has been too lenient to his debtors, and with the help of an accountant friend in New York City sends sternly worded letters to more than 30 subscribers demanding that they pay up, despite Ichabod's warning that things are not done that way in Phippsboro. As Ichabod predicted they would, the subscribers take offense at the letters rather than pay. One delinquent subscriber, retired lawyer Caleb Cunningham, discovers an 18th-century law still on the books allowing the payment of debts in barter. He pays his $14 bill with a pig, the newspaper's other debtors follow suit, and although Bob receives no cash, his office soon is full of livestock. During an auction, Caleb calls on the newspaper's subscribers to pay their debts, and Bob receives the money he needs to keep the Phippsboro Bulletin financially afloat.
12	"Benjie's Spots"	Norman Abbott	Unknown	December 12, 1961
Christine White and Jimmy Mathers in "Benjie's Spots." When Benjie contracts a mysterious case of spots, Bob brings in a doctor from New York City in the belief that Phippsboro's doctors are somewhat lacking.
13	"Teenage Journalist"	Unknown	Unknown	December 19, 1961
Bob brings high school student Liz Halladay (or Liza Halliday) into the newspaper office to teach her journalism, and she develops a crush on him. Guest star: Yvonne Craig.
14	"Bob's Redhead"	Unknown	Unknown	December 26, 1961
Leona, a former girlfriend of Bob's, comes to Phippsboro from New York City for a visit, and Bob is the perfect host – until he finds out she is intent on matrimony. Guest star: Merry Anders.
15	"The Phipps Papers"	Norman Abbott	Joanna Lee	January 2, 1962
Bob runs into difficulty when he delves into the story of Caleb Phipps, the founder of Phippsboro.
16	"My Friend Lippy"	Unknown	Unknown	January 9, 1962
After Bob invites his uncle, racetrack tout Lippy Bourke, to stay at his home, Lippy creates a furor when he begins wagering on races with the townspeople of Phippsboro – and winning, of course – and teaches Benjie to play cassino. Guest star: Jesse White.
17	"The Ad Salesman"	Unknown	Unknown	January 16, 1962
Bob feels he is not getting good results from his advertising manager, so he imports an expert advertising salesman from New York City – but the new "salesman" turns out to be a woman.
18	"The Old Stowe Road"	Norman Abbott	Unknown	January 23, 1962
Appalled at how decrepit the Old Stowe Road – named for Harriet Beecher Stowe — has become, Bob and several local businessmen propose bulldozing it and replacing it with a new, modern thoroughfare to stimulate economic growth and create prosperity in Phippsboro. Bob gets the city council — pleased that the county will pay for the project – to approve the idea. Ichabod agrees that the road is in bad shape, but cautions Bob that Phippsboro's residents do not welcome change. Bob nonetheless writes a stirring editorial in the Phippsboro Bulletin calling for the road's replacement – and when Abby discovers that the new road will require demolition of the old one, she mobilizes the women of Phippsboro in opposition to the plan, leaving Bob to try to resolve the dispute without becoming the local pariah. Guest stars: Mary Treen, Irene Ryan, Alice Backes, and Robert F. Simon.
19	"A Teacher for Bob"	Unknown	Unknown	January 30, 1962
Benjie decides Bob is lonely, so he writes a love letter, signs it with Bob's name, and sends it along with flowers his schoolteacher, Miss Tyler. When Bob finds out about it, he goes to the school superintendent – Ichabod – for help. Guest star: Sue Randall.
20	"Parking Problems"	Unknown	Unknown	February 6, 1962
Phippsboro's traffic commissioner – Ichabod – has parking meters installed on Phippsboro's main street, and Bob strongly objects.
21	"Bob's Teenage Guest"	Unknown	Unknown	February 13, 1962
Christine White and Jenny Maxwell in "Bob's Teenage Guest." Bob invites the teenaged son of an old friend to spend a week as his houseguest in Phippsboro, then discovers that the boy is a juvenile delinquent. Guest star: Jenny Maxwell.
22	"Bob's Housekeeper"	Unknown	Unknown	February 27, 1962
When Aunt Livvy goes on a vacation, Bob looks for a temporary housekeeper, and eyebrows are raised around Phippsboro when he hires his first applicant for the job – Miss Lily Fontaine, an unemployed exotic dancer. Guest star: Leslie Parrish
22	"Benjie's Indian"	Unknown	Unknown	March 6, 1962
Bob suspects that someone posing as an American Indian is selling children at Benjie's school phoney "Indian" arrowheads labeled "Made in Japan," and he sets out to investigate.
24	"Big Business"	Unknown	Unknown	March 13, 1962
When the town's banker, Samuel Cheever, asks Bob what he should do to make profitable use of several plots of land he owns, Bob suggests that they try to attract industries to the Phippsboro area in the hope that they will purchase the land – but the town's longtime residents object to the idea. Guest stars: Philip Coolidge, Henry Hunter, and Russell Arms.
25	"The Celebrity"	Norman Abbott	Story by : Joseph Hoffman; Teleplay by : Bob Ross	March 20, 1962
Robert Sterling and Rod Serling in "The Celebrity." Bob discovers that the famous, but reclusive, author Eugene Hollenfield – known for his books Picture in the Cornfield and Life with Louie, as well as for associating with a beatnik-like group called "The Clan" — has moved to Phippsboro to work in seclusion, and becomes determined to get an interview with him for the Phippsboro Bulletin. When all else fails, Bob and Abby disguise themselves as beatniks and crash a party at Hollenfield's house. Guest stars: Rod Serling, Ann Atmar, Robert Sorrells, Tim Graham, Frances Morris, and Nick Blair.
26	"Bob's Bathing Beauties"	Unknown	Unknown	March 27, 1962
Members of the staid Phippsboro women's club ask Bob to help them stage a fashion show.
27	"Lippy's Horse"	Unknown	Unknown	April 3, 1962
Bob reluctantly allows his Uncle Lippy to visit again, only to discover that the visit includes him riding a horse for Lippy. Guest star: Jesse White.
28	"Election Fever"	Unknown	Unknown	April 10, 1962
At a town meeting, Bob is nominated to oppose Ichabod in the upcoming mayoral election. Ichabod has been the mayor of Phippsboro for 28 years and previously had always run unopposed, but polls show Bob well in the lead, which makes Abby furious with Bob – until she realizes that Bob does not actually want to be mayor. To make sure Ichabod wins again, Bob decides to purposely perform poorly in a campaign debate.
29	"Bob's Award"	Norman Abbott	Leo Rifkin & Mel Tolkin	April 17, 1962
When Ichabod owned the Phippsboro Bulletin, he always wanted it to win the Federation Award as the best weekly newspaper in New England. After it finally does win the award under Bob's ownership, Bob tries to figure out a way to share it with Ichabod. Guest star: Nina Shipman.
30	"Livvy's Love Affair"	Unknown	Unknown	April 24, 1962
A stranger begins to court Aunt Livvy, but really is interested only in her money.
31	"Lord Byron of Phippsboro"	Norman Abbott	Unknown	May 1, 1962
When Bob publishes the poetry of young Elmer Waldschlagel in the Phippsboro Bulletin, the boy becomes egotistical and begins to refer to himself as an "artist," much to the annoyance of his father.
32	"Benjie's Pageant"	Unknown	Unknown	May 8, 1962
Bob is proud when Benjie gets a part in the school pageant, but then is indignant when he learns that Benjie will be portraying Benedict Arnold.
33	"Jonathan's Romance"	Unknown	Unknown	May 15, 1962
Bob offers advice on romance to Jonathan, who has a crush on pretty cheerleader Mary Tanner at his high school – but she doesn't know Jonathan is alive.
34	"Ichabod's Niece"	Unknown	Unknown	May 22, 1962
Ichabod's niece returns to Phippsboro after two years in Paris and finds herself shunned by her less-sophisticated ex-boyfriend.
35	"Women's Rights"	Unknown	Unknown	May 29, 1962
A vacancy occurs on the Phippsboro city council, so Bob writes an editorial urging women to play a greater role in politics, angering the men in town. Guest star: Mary Treen
36	"Dial Phones"	Unknown	Unknown	June 5, 1962
After Bob loses an exclusive story for the newspaper because half the population of Phippsboro is listening in to his telephone conversation on a party line, he launches a campaign for rotary dial telephones in Phippsboro.
