= Jenny Maxwell =

American actress (1941–1981)

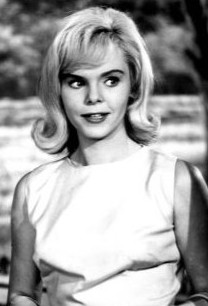
- Maxwell in Ichabod and Me, 1962
- Born: Jennifer Helene Maxwell; September 3, 1941
- Died: June 10, 1981 (aged 39); Beverly Hills, California, U.S.
- Cause of death: Homicide
- Occupations: Film, television actress

Jennifer Helene Maxwell (September 3, 1941 – June 10, 1981) was an American film and television actress, probably best remembered for her role in the 1961 Elvis Presley musical film Blue Hawaii.

== Early years ==
Maxwell was the daughter of a construction worker from Norway (the original family name of Moksvold was changed when the family emigrated to the United States a decade before in 1949), and was also speculated to be a distant relative of Marilyn Monroe (1926–1962). This was disputed by Buddy Moorehouse, her cousin's son, who claimed that it was "entirely untrue" and merely a falsehood spread to bolster her career.

== Film and television ==
Stage and film director Vincente Minnelli (1903–1986), saw young Maxwell when she was 16 years old and a high school student in Brooklyn, New York. He had her do a screen test to use her in one of his films then in production, possibly to portray Frank Sinatra's character Dave Hirsch's niece Dawn Hirsch," daughter of his older brother Frank, later played by Betty Lou Keim (1938–2010), who got the role, in Some Came Running (released December 1958).

Maxwell is especially known for her role playing spoiled flirtatious teen-aged pretty blonde-haired schoolgirl "Ellie Corbett" on a chaperoned Hawaii vacation trip with her teacher Miss Abigail Prentiss and two other girls in Blue Hawaii (released November 1961), a typical example of producer / director Hal Wallis' (1898–1986) popular series of Elvis Presley (1935–1977) films during the decade, featuring his rock and roll music. Elvis' character Chad, a tour guide, eventually tames rebellious, nasty-tempered Ellie by spanking her on the beach at night, after she visits and attempts to seduce him in his hotel room. Rejected, she grabs a hotel jeep, driving recklessly into the night, pursued by him, then crashes it, jumps out on the beach and swims into the surf to end her life in desperation. After her spanking and crying fit, and Chad's lecture, she later undergoes a dramatic, seemingly miraculous, change of personality showing a sweet, considerate, polite attitude at breakfast the following morning with the others.

She also appeared in Blue Denim (1959); Take Her, She's Mine (1963, which also starred James Stewart); and Shotgun Wedding (also 1963), Maxwell's cinematic swan song, co-written by infamous filmmaker Edward D. Wood, Jr., 1924–1978).

In addition to this she appeared in several television shows beginning in 1959, extending into the 1960s, including Father Knows Best (1959), The Twilight Zone (S-2 E-22, episode "Long Distance Call", 1961), Route 66 (1961), Ichabod and Me (1962), The Joey Bishop Show (1962), 77 Sunset Strip (1963), Wagon Train, and My Three Sons (1967).

== Personal life ==
On April 17, 1959, the 18-year-old Maxwell married 24-year-old Paul W. Rapp, an assistant director. After separating two and half years later, in December 1961, they had a very public divorce and custody battle over their young son Brian, with Maxwell winning custody after testifying about Rapp's "extremely possessive and overly jealous" nature. The divorce was granted January 29, 1963.

Seven years later, she married Ervin M. Roeder, a successful attorney who was 21 years her senior, on February 15, 1970 in Los Angeles.

== Death ==
In the afternoon of June 10, 1981, shortly after their separation, both Maxwell and Roeder were shot and killed in the lobby of Maxwell's Beverly Hills condo / apartment during what was reported at the time as being a botched robbery. She was only 39 years old.

The murders supposedly remained unsolved, and the "botched robbery" story was repeatedly cited in subsequent news / feature articles about Maxwell. But in the 2021 published book Murder of an Elvis Girl: Solving the Jenny Maxwell Case, author Buddy Moorhouse (a cousin of Maxwell) reveals that in his research, that the Los Angeles Police Department (LAPD) had concluded at the time, that since no property was taken from the victim(s), the shooting was probably instead a botched hitman attack on Maxwell, orchestrated by Roeder over the pending divorce finances. Roeder (a defense attorney with reputed Mafia underworld criminal connections) had allegedly arranged to receive a survivable superficial wound from the attacking hit man as a diversion and to throw off blame, but in the unfortunate event, the wound to his abdomen instead proved fatal, and he died a few hours after the shooting.

A further irony revealed in the book is that Maxwell's son Brian received absolutely nothing from his late mother's estate, since Roeder had survived his wife by several hours. Because Maxwell had died under the legal status of intestate (without a will), all her assets automatically passed to Roeder, and the entire combined Roeder-Maxwell estate and property / possessions was inherited by Roeder's daughters from his previous marriage, who refused to give Brian anything.

== See also ==
- List of unsolved murders (1980–1999)
