= Nightmare at 20,000 Feet =

- The Twilight Zone episode
- Screen test of episode
- Episode no.: Season 5 Episode 3
- Directed by: Richard Donner
- Written by: Richard Matheson
- Based on: "Nightmare at 20,000 Feet" by Richard Matheson
- Production code: 2605
- Original air date: October 11, 1963
- Running time: 25 minutes (without commercials)

Guest appearances
- William Shatner; Christine White; Edward Kemmer; Asa Maynor; Nick Cravat

Episode chronology
← Previous "Steel"	Next → "A Kind of a Stopwatch"
- The Twilight Zone (1959 TV series) (season 5)

"Nightmare at 20,000 Feet" is the third episode of the fifth season of the American television anthology series The Twilight Zone, based on the short story of the same name by Richard Matheson, first published in the short story anthology Alone by Night (1961). It originally aired on October 11, 1963, and is one of the most well-known and frequently referenced episodes of the series. The story follows a passenger on an airline flight, played by William Shatner, who notices a hideous creature trying to sabotage the aircraft during flight.

In 2019, Keith Phipps of Vulture stated that the episode "doubles as... an effective shorthand for a fear of flying", making it endure in popular culture. This is the first of six episodes to be directed by Richard Donner.

The episode has some similarities to the earlier episodes "The Odyssey of Flight 33" and "King Nine Will Not Return", both from season two.

== Opening narration ==
Portrait of a frightened man: Mr. Robert Wilson, thirty-seven, husband, father and salesman on sick leave. Mr. Wilson has just been discharged from a sanatorium where he spent the last six months recovering from a nervous breakdown, the onset of which took place on an evening not dissimilar to this one, on an airliner very much like the one in which Mr. Wilson is about to be flown home—the difference being that, on that evening half a year ago, Mr. Wilson's flight was terminated by the onslaught of his mental breakdown. Tonight, he's traveling all the way to his appointed destination, which, contrary to Mr. Wilson's plan, happens to be in the darkest corner of the Twilight Zone.

== Plot ==
While traveling by airplane on a dark stormy night, Robert Wilson sees a gremlin on the wing outside his window. He tries to alert his wife Julia and the stewardess, but every time they look out the window, the gremlin hides, so Robert's claim seems crazy. Robert admits the oddness of his being the only one to see the gremlin. His credibility is further undermined by this being his first flight since suffering a nervous breakdown six months earlier, which also occurred on an aircraft. Robert realizes that his wife is starting to think he needs to go back to the sanitarium, but his more immediate concern is the gremlin tinkering with the engines, which could cause the aircraft to crash.

In response to his repeated attempts to raise an alarm, the flight engineer comes out to evaluate the situation and the stewardess gives Robert a sedative, which he pretends to take but spits out. Robert then takes a sleeping police officer's revolver, straps himself in, and opens an emergency exit window by which he is sitting. Fighting against the wind and rain, he shoots repeatedly at the gremlin, who is struck and falls off the wing.

Once the airplane has landed, Robert is whisked away on a gurney and in a straitjacket. He tells his wife that only he really knows what happened during the flight. In the final scene, the camera cranes up and tracks back to reveal damage to one of the aircraft's engines, as yet unnoticed by anyone.

== Closing narration ==
The flight of Mr. Robert Wilson has ended now, a flight not only from point A to point B, but also from the fear of recurring mental breakdown. Mr. Wilson has that fear no longer... though, for the moment, he is, as he has said, alone in this assurance. Happily, his conviction will not remain isolated too much longer, for happily, tangible manifestation is very often left as evidence of trespass, even from so intangible a quarter as the Twilight Zone.

== Cast ==
- William Shatner as Robert Wilson
- Christine White as Julia Wilson
- Edward Kemmer as the flight engineer
- Asa Maynor as stewardess Betty Crosby
- Nick Cravat (uncredited) as the gremlin

William Shatner and Christine White each appeared in one earlier episode of the original series. Shatner starred in "Nick of Time" (October 1960) and White had the female lead in "The Prime Mover" (March 1961).

== Short story version ==
The short story which appeared in 1961 in Alone by Night differs from the TV episode. In the short story, the name is Arthur Jeffrey Wilson, while in the TV episode it is Robert or Bob Wilson. The major difference is that Wilson is flying alone in the story. His wife's name is given as Jacqueline, while in the episode it is Julia. Wilson has two sons in the story. In the story, the gun is brought aboard the airplane by Wilson undetected. He experiences nausea when he flies and takes Dramamine pills. This explains his anxiety.

In the episode, Wilson's earlier hospitalization is detailed as the background to his anxiety. He has had a nervous breakdown and is in recovery. In the short story, by contrast, this background is absent. Instead, Wilson is suicidal. At one point, he takes out his gun and contemplates shooting himself.

He describes the apparition as a "gremlin" and explains that Allied pilots had seen unidentified objects during World War II. This detail is briefly mentioned by Wilson in the episode.

The story and the episode are both ambiguous about the creature. In the story, it is described as a "filthy little animal" but also as a "man" like in the episode. The creature has "a face not human" in the story.

In the story, Wilson stated that it would be revealed that what he said was true when the airplane was inspected. In the episode, the damaged engine is shown that vindicates Wilson's account. Nevertheless, both endings are ambiguous. In the story, we have to rely on Wilson's own account of events. In the episode, the damaged engine suggests his version may be true, but there is no evidence that it was due to the gremlin.

== Remakes ==
=== Twilight Zone: The Movie version ===
The episode was remade in 1983 by director George Miller as a segment of Twilight Zone: The Movie. John Valentine, played by John Lithgow, suffers from severe fear of flying. The plane flies through a violent thunderstorm, and Valentine hides in the lavatory trying to recover from a panic attack, but the flight attendants coax him back to his seat. He notices a hideous gremlin on the wing of the plane and begins to spiral into another severe panic. He watches as the creature wreaks havoc on the wing, damaging the plane's engine. Valentine finally snaps and attempts to break the window with an oxygen canister, but is wrestled to the ground by another passenger (an off-duty security guard). Valentine takes the passenger's gun, shoots out the window (causing a breach in the pressurized cabin), and begins firing at the gremlin. This catches the attention of the gremlin, who rushes up to Valentine and destroys the gun, then leaps away into the sky. The police, crew, and passengers write off Valentine as insane. However, while a straitjacketed Valentine is carried off in an ambulance claiming that he is a hero, the aircraft maintenance crew arrives and finds the damage to the plane's engines, complete with claw marks which alerts everyone.

=== 2019 version ===
Adam Scott was cast in an episode for the 2019 reboot series, entitled "Nightmare at 30,000 Feet". Other cast mates include Chris Diamantopoulos, China Shavers, Katie Findlay and Nicholas Lea. The remake removes the gremlin completely, though it makes a cameo as a doll that washes up on the atoll near the end, and instead focuses on a sinister podcast hosted by the enigmatic Rodman Edwards (voiced by Dan Carlin).

==== Opening narration ====
Settling in for a 13-hour transatlantic flight to a land rife with ancient mysteries is Justin Sanderson. Mr. Sanderson's occupation is to uncover unbiased truth. But with an hour left before certain doom, he must ask the right questions of the right people. Landing at the truth this time will require an unscheduled stopover in The Twilight Zone.

==== Plot ====
Justin Sanderson is a magazine journalist suffering from PTSD, who is boarding Golden Airways Flight 1015 for a flight to Tel Aviv. While awaiting his flight, he befriends Joe Beaumont, a former pilot for the company and alcoholic who suffered some unspecified failure in the past.

At his seat, Sanderson discovers an MP3 player that has a podcast playing called Enigmatique, which describes a "Flight 1015" which was lost without explanation. Sanderson begins to panic and tries to make sense of the situation, but is told to calm down. He listens further and hears speculation about passengers who might have been involved somehow in the plane's disappearance; his attempts to investigate only annoy the other passengers and crew. He learns that the last words heard from the pilot were "Good night, New York", and desperately tries to warn the pilot not to say that, but is restrained by an air marshal.

Beaumont approaches and confides that he believes him. Guessing that the flight number – and coincidental departure time – is the code to the cockpit, Sanderson gets Beaumont access, who overpowers the crew and takes control of the flight. As Beaumont subdues the passengers and crew with oxygen deprivation, he reveals his plan to crash the plane to atone for his past failures. As Beaumont signs off with "Good night, New York", it dawns on Sanderson that he indirectly causes the crash.

He awakens on an island and learns from the MP3 player that all the passengers and crew actually survived and were rescued, except for Sanderson who mysteriously disappeared. The other passengers and crew reveal themselves where they blame Sanderson for stranding them. Taking a nearby rock, he shouts to them that he saved their lives as he tells the approaching irate crowd to stay back. They start to beat Sanderson to death. The final shot pulls away from the distant fight scene and more approaching passengers to show the island and the burning wreckage of Golden Airways Flight 1015 offshore.

==== Closing narration ====
In his final moments, Justin Sanderson made the case that he did everything he could to avert disaster. But in the end, he was an investigative reporter unwilling to investigate himself, until it was too late. Justin discovered that the flight path to hell is paved with good intentions, and it passes directly through The Twilight Zone.

== Reception ==
=== Accolades ===
Keith McDuffee of TV Squad listed the gremlin as the ninth scariest television character of all time in 2008.

== In popular culture ==
The episode is considered one of the most popular of the series and parts of the plot have been repeated and parodied several times in popular culture, including television shows, films, radio and music:

=== Parodies ===
- On the October 20, 1984, episode of Saturday Night Live, in a skit with guest host Jesse Jackson, Ed Grimley sits next to Jackson on a plane, sees the gremlin, and disturbs Jackson, who eventually walks off the set.
- In The Simpsons episode "Treehouse of Horror IV" (1993) is a segment called "Terror at 5 1/2 Feet". It takes place on a school bus rather than an aircraft, and puts Bart Simpson in the role of Bob Wilson. An AMC Gremlin driven by Hans Moleman drives alongside the bus.
- Episode 12a of season 1 of Johnny Bravo, "The Man Who Cried 'Clown'", parodies the episode. On a flight, Johnny Bravo is noticing a clown standing on the wing and spends the episode trying to alert the bizarre passengers. In the twist ending, Johnny gets rid of the clown only to be told that there is a clown on the other wing as well and they are supposed to balance the plane.
- In the 3rd Rock from the Sun episode "Dick's Big Giant Headache: Part 1" (1999), John Lithgow's character meets a character played by Shatner as he gets off an aircraft. When Shatner describes seeing something horrifying on the wing, Lithgow replies, breaking the fourth wall, "The same thing happened to me!" This references not only Lithgow's portrayal of the nervous passenger in the 1983 Twilight Zone remake, but also an earlier 3rd Rock episode "Frozen Dick" (Season 1, Ep 12, 1996) when he and Jane Curtin's characters were due to fly to Chicago to pick up awards before Dick panicked about something on the wing while the plane was still on the tarmac and gets them both kicked off the plane.
- In the "Tryptophan-tasy" episode of The Bernie Mac Show, Bernie has a series of fever dreams after eating rancid turkey on Thanksgiving. In his second dream, Bernie and his wife are flying to a vacation but he sees his niece, Vanessa, as a version of the gremlin on the wing of the plane.
- On the March 16, 2010 episode of Saturday Night Live, guest host Jude Law plays Shatner's original role, while cast regular Bobby Moynihan is the gremlin on the wing of the jet. At one point, musical guest Pearl Jam are all on the wing as well, talking with the gremlin.
- In the July 7, 1996, episode of Muppets Tonight, Miss Piggy is bothered by a gremlin while riding in an airplane. Miss Piggy goes to tell another passenger, who turns out to be William Shatner (playing himself). Shatner looks at the Gremlin and nonchalantly says, "Oh. Him again." He claims that he has been complaining about the gremlin for years, but nobody does anything about it.
- In Ace Ventura: When Nature Calls, Jim Carrey parodies Shatner and his character in this film.
- In the movie Sharknado 2: The Second One, Fin Shepard checks the wing of the plane, and sees a shark on the wing of the plane. The flight attendant tells him to calm down.
- The Lego Batman Movie features gremlins from the film Gremlins attacking a plane.
- In the Futurama episode "I Dated a Robot", the main characters watch a TV show entitled The Scary Door, which features a gremlin damaging a plane along with parodies of other story-lines from The Twilight Zone. In the season 7 episode, “Zapp Dingbat,” Zapp Brannigan says to Kif Kroker, “Kif, I’m bored. What say you go out on the wing and pretend you’re a gremlin.”
- In the 2015 sketch "Airplane Continental" of sketch comedy show Key & Peele, Peele's character encounters a gremlin while looking out the airplane window. Peele would later produce a non-parodic remake of this story for the 2019 Twilight Zone series, although omitting the gremlin (see above).
- In Madagascar 2, there is a scene in which Alex the Lion looks out of the window and sees Mort hanging out of the plane's wing in a similar manner to the gremlin.
- In the Marvel comic Loki: Agent of Asgard, characters Loki and Lorelei, hanging off the wing of a plane, are only visible to one man in the plane. The man is also holding a tablet open to a Movie Tropes.com page titled "Something on the Wing" with a quote and drawn frame from the episode.

=== Other references ===
- The Adaalat (TV series) episode 'The Flight Assassinator' is largely inspired by this episode.
- American band Anthrax made a video (directed by Marcos Siega) for their 1998 song Inside Out inspired by this episode.
- UK band Pop Will Eat Itself's 1990 album Cure for Sanity include the song "Nightmare at 20,000 feet". The track is said to be inspired by singer Clint Mansell's fear of flying.
- The episode inspired the opening sequence of the 2000 slasher movie Urban Legends: Final Cut, directed by John Ottman.
- In the 2014 horror film Flight 7500, a character watches the episode as part of the in-flight services, paralleling their own dire situation.
- A 1973 made-for-television horror film, unrelated to this episode of The Twilight Zone, similarly titled The Horror at 37,000 Feet, also co-stars William Shatner.
- In episode 14 of Extreme Ghostbusters, "Grease", two references are made to "that Twilight Zone episode with Captain Kirk" during dealings with a gremlin. The second reference takes place on a plane in which the gremlin has been let loose.

== Bibliography ==
- DeVoe, Bill. Trivia from The Twilight Zone. Albany, Georgia: Bear Manor Media, 2008. ISBN 978-1-59393-136-0.
- Grams, Martin. The Twilight Zone: Unlocking the Door to a Television Classic. Churchville, Maryland: OTR Publishing, 2008. ISBN 978-0-9703310-9-0.
- Groening, Matt, Ray Richmond and Antonia Coffman, eds. The Simpsons: A Complete Guide to Our Favorite Family. New York: HarperPerennial, 1997. ISBN 978-0-06-095252-5.
- Zicree, Marc Scott. The Twilight Zone Companion. Los Angeles: Sillman-James Press, 1982 (second edition). ISBN 978-1-87950-509-4.
