= Man Crazy (1953 film) =

1953 film directed by Irving Lerner

- Directed by: Irving Lerner
- Written by: Sidney Harmon; Phillip Yordan
- Produced by: Sidney Harmon; Phillip Yordan
- Starring: Neville Brand; Christine White; Irene Anders; Colleen Miller; John Brown
- Cinematography: Floyd Crosby
- Edited by: Marjorie Fowler
- Music by: Ernest Gold
- Color process: Black and white
- Production company: Security Pictures
- Distributed by: 20th Century Fox
- Release date: December 2, 1953
- Running time: 79 minutes
- Country: United States
- Language: English

Man Crazy is a 1953 American film noir drama film directed by Irving Lerner and starring Neville Brand, Christine White, Irene Anders, Colleen Miller and John Brown.

== Plot ==
Three women come to Hollywood to break into the movies.

== Cast ==
- Neville Brand as Paul Wocynski
- Christine White as Georgia Daniels
- Irene Anders as Millie Pickett
- Colleen Miller as Judy Bassett
- John Brown as Dr. Duncan
- Joe Turkel as Ray
- Karen Steele as Marge
- Jack Larson as Bob
- William Lundmark as Steve (as Bill Lundmark)
- John Crawford as Farmer
- Ottola Nesmith as Mrs. Becker
- Charles Victor as Mechanic
- Frances Osborne as Customer

== See also ==
- List of American films of 1953
