= Earl B. Dunckel =

American journalist, publicist, and author

- Born: Earl Bond Dunckel; September 14, 1918; Syracuse, New York, U.S.
- Died: December 8, 2002 (aged 84); Las Vegas, Nevada, U.S.
- Occupations: Journalist, corporate publicist, author
- Employer: General Electric
- Known for: Managing Ronald Reagan's tenure at the General Electric Theater
- Spouse: J. Renee Dunckel
- Children: 1 son (Earl B. Dunckel III), 2 stepdaughters

Earl Bond Dunckel (September 14, 1918 – December 8, 2002) was an American journalist, corporate publicist, and author.. He is best known for his role as the primary General Electric (GE) communications executive who selected and managed Ronald Reagan during the foundational years of the General Electric Theater. Dunckel’s mentorship and close work with Reagan between 1954 and 1955 is recognized by political historians as a critical catalyst for Reagan’s transition from a Hollywood actor into a conservative political figure.

== Early life and career ==
Born in Syracuse, New York in 1918, Dunckel began his career as a journalist before entering public relations, which he considered "more fun out on the playing field than sitting around the stands forever". After serving in the United States Army during World War II, he joined the corporate communications and public relations division of the General Electric Company.

== General Electric and Ronald Reagan (1954–1955) ==
In 1954, GE sought a new "public face" to host its Sunday-night anthology, General Electric Theater. Dunckel was placed in charge of the executive search, aiming for an individual with "good moral character" and intelligence who could project the relatable persona of a "corner grocer". Dunckel identified Ronald Reagan—then a Hollywood actor whose film career had stalled—as the ideal candidate.

Dunckel personally managed Reagan's initial tours and corporate messaging during the first two years of the contract (1954–1955). Because Reagan had a profound fear of flying, his contract stipulated that all travel across the country be completed by train.. Dunckel traveled alongside Reagan on these extended train rides, during which Dunckel, a self-described "archconservative," engaged in long hours of debate with Reagan regarding the New Deal and Truman administrations. These long journeys provided Reagan the time to read foundational free-market and conservative literature, including Witness by Whittaker Chambers, F. A. Hayek's The Road to Serfdom, and Economics in One Lesson by Henry Hazlitt

Reagan spent a quarter of his time traveling to visit 250,000 GE workers across 139 plants. Dunckel recounted that on the very first day of the 1954 speaking tour, Reagan was unexpectedly invited to give a speech to a local group of schoolteachers. Despite Dunckel warning him that there was no time to draft a formal script, Reagan accepted, wrote a speech on the spot, and received a ten-minute standing ovation. Dunckel later noted this event as the moment he truly recognized the "breadth and depth" of Reagan's political knowledge. Dunckel also managed Reagan's public interactions; in one instance, Reagan successfully persuaded a stage-struck girl in Erie, Pennsylvania not to move to Los Angeles, later telling Dunckel he would do "almost anything to keep another one of these little girls from going out there and adding to the list of whores out in Hollywood".. Dunckel was succeeded in his traveling role by fellow GE aide George Dalen.

== Later life and scholarship ==
Dunckel shifted focus into corporate economic forecasting, co-authoring the book The Business Environment for the Seventies: A Trend Analysis for Business Planning alongside William K. Reed and Ian H. Wilson in 1970..

He maintained a lifelong friendship with Reagan, corresponding with him extensively regarding U.S. political and economic conditions from 1965 through 1990. Reagan frequently wrote to Dunckel to report on key political meetings, including high-profile updates regarding figures like Jesse Jackson.

In 1982, Dunckel recorded a multi-part oral history transcript with the Regional Oral History Office at the University of California, Berkeley's Bancroft Library. Entitled *Ronald Reagan and the General Electric Theater, 1954-1955*, the text remains a vital primary source used by historians and Reagan biographers to understand the "Boulwarism" corporate culture of GE and its direct impact on Reagan's conversion to political conservatism.

Dunckel moved to Las Vegas, Nevada in 1996, where he was an active member of the National Press Club and local community groups until his death on December 8, 2002.

Dunckel's personal memoirs, papers, and historical letters regarding Ronald Reagan were acquired by the Hoover Institution Library & Archives at Stanford University in 2002. The collection spans 1965 to 1990 and includes personal correspondence, a memoir, and printed matter detailing United States politics

== See also ==
- Political positions of Ronald Reagan
