= General Electric Theater =

Anthology radio and television drama series

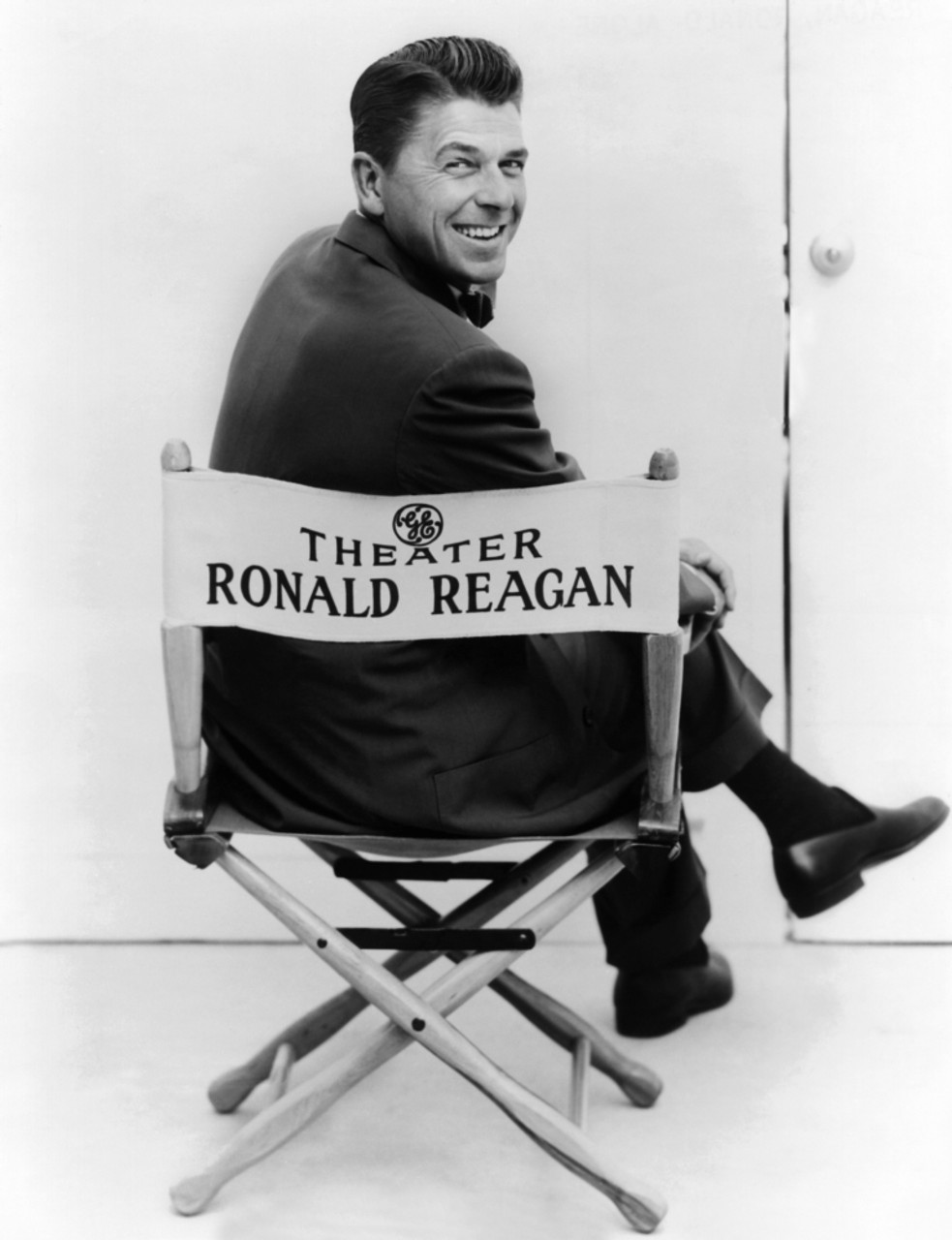
- Ronald Reagan, host
- Genre: Anthology series
- Presented by: Ronald Reagan
- Country of origin: United States
- Original language: English
- No. of seasons: 10
- No. of episodes: 302

Production
- Running time: 30 minutes
- Production company: Revue Studios

Original release
- Network: CBS
- Release: February 1, 1953 – June 3, 1962

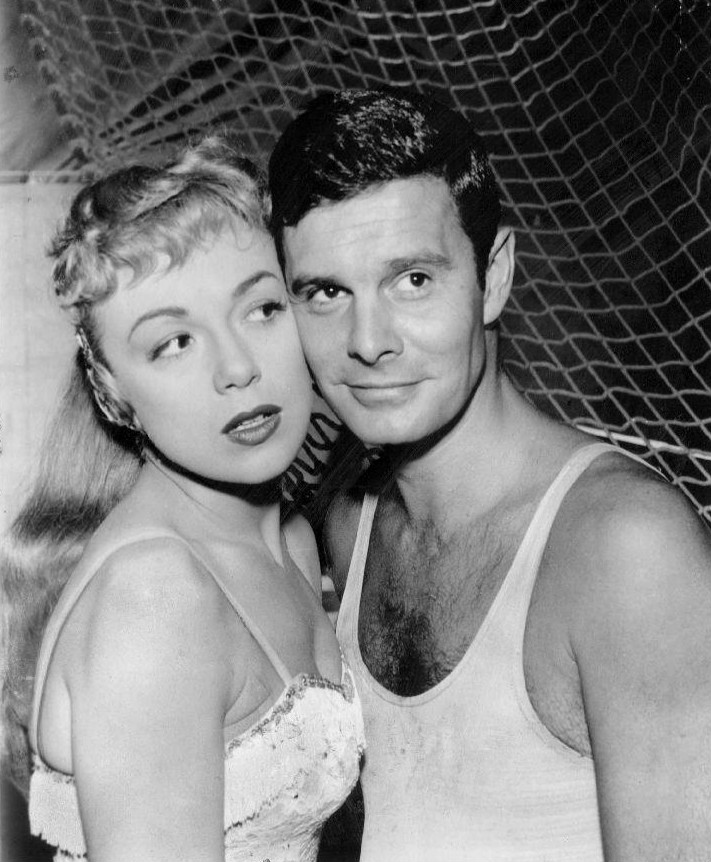
Edie Adams and Louis Jourdan in episode "A Falling Angel" (1958)

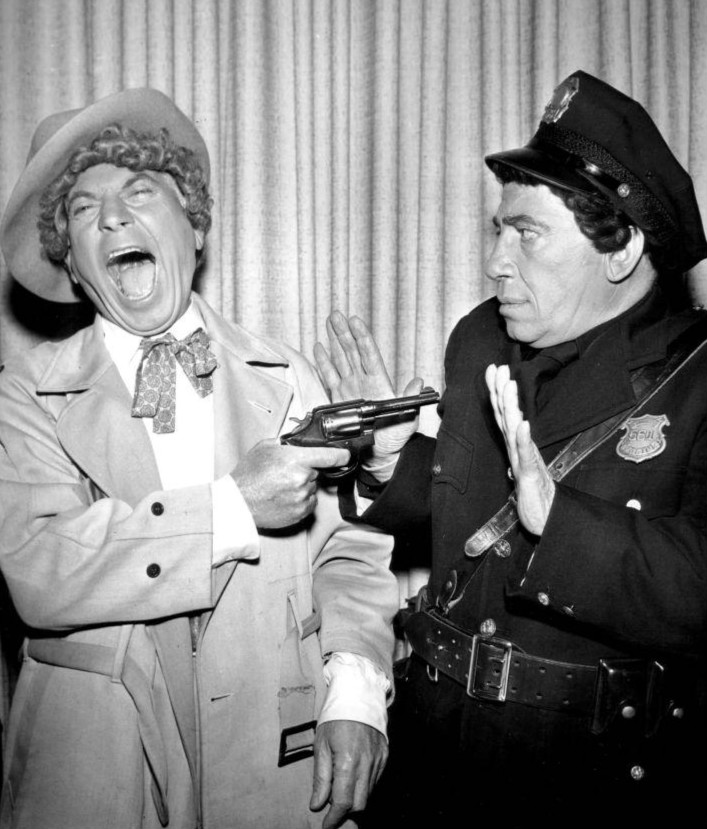
Harpo and Chico Marx performed "The Incredible Jewelry Robbery" in pantomime in 1959.

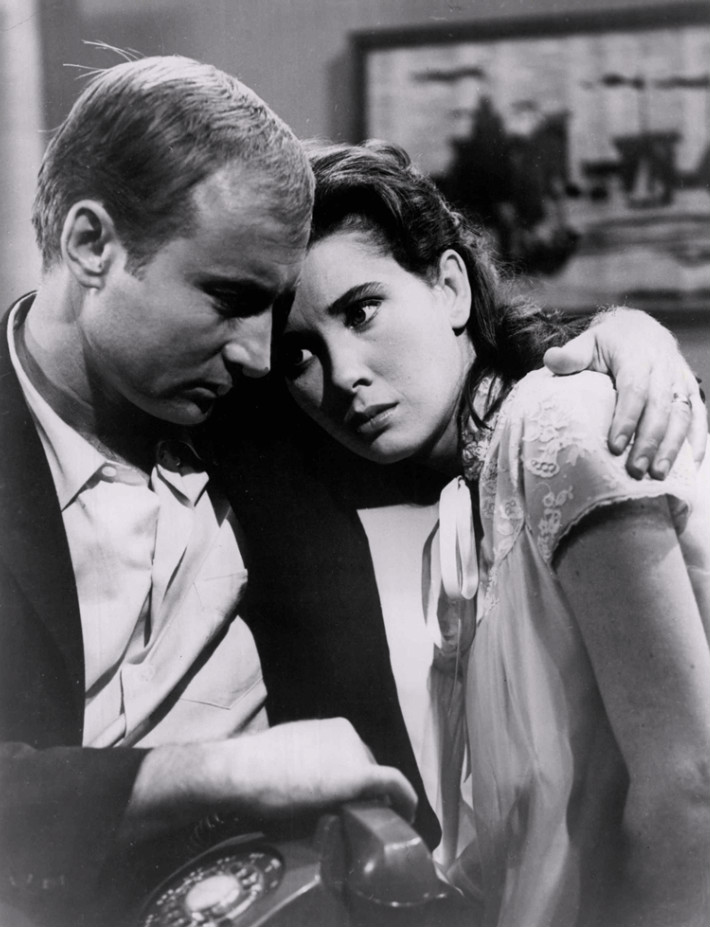
Nick Adams and Elinor Donahue in episode "A Voice on the Phone" (1961)

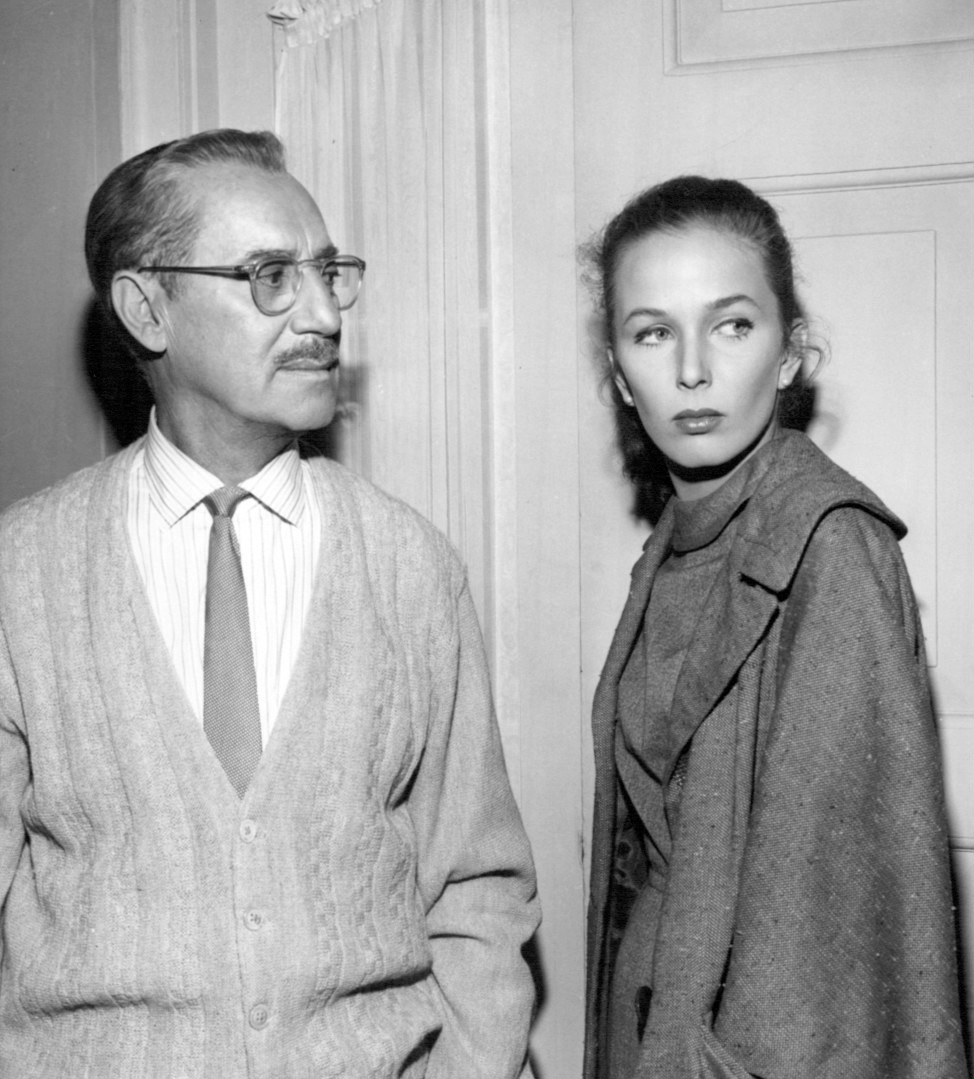
Groucho Marx and Brooke Hayward in "The Hold Out" (1961)

General Electric Theater is an American anthology series hosted by Ronald Reagan that was broadcast on CBS radio and television. The series was sponsored by General Electric's Department of Public Relations.

== Radio ==
After an audition show on January 18, 1953, titled The Token, with Dana Andrews, the radio series, a summer replacement for The Bing Crosby Program, debuted on CBS on July 9, 1953, with Ronald Colman in an episode based on Random Harvest. With such guest stars as Cary Grant, Irene Dunne, Van Johnson, Jane Wyman, William Holden, Alan Young, Dorothy McGuire, John Hodiak, Ann Blyth, James Mason, Joan Fontaine, and Judy Garland the series continued until October 1, 1953. Jaime del Valle produced and directed the show. Ken Carpenter was the host and announcer. Wilbur Hatch supplied the music.

== Television ==
The television version of the program, produced by MCA-TV/Revue, was broadcast every Sunday evening at 9:00 pm EST, beginning February 1 1953, and ending June 3 1962. Each of the estimated 209 television episodes was an adaptation of a novel, short story, play, film, or magazine fiction. An exception was the 1954 episode "Music for Christmas", which featured choral director Fred Waring and his group The Pennsylvanians performing Christmas music. Jacques Tourneur directed four episodes, "The Martyr'" (1955), "Into the Night" (1955), "Aftermath" (1960) and Star Witness “The Lili Parrish Story" (1961). The April 24, 1960, episode, "Adam's Apples", was the pilot for the situation comedy Ichabod and Me, which aired on CBS during the 1961–1962 television season.

On September 26, 1954, Ronald Reagan debuted as the only host of the program. GE added a host to provide continuity in the anthology format. The show's Nielsen ratings improved from #27 in the 1953–1954 season to #17 in 1954–1955, followed #11 in 1955–1956, #3 in 1956–1957, #7 in 1957–1958, #26 in 1958–1959, #23 in 1959–1960, and #20 in 1960–1961.

Reagan's contract with GE also entailed work as a motivational speaker for the company. Working with Earl B. Dunckel of GE's Public Relations department, he had visited 135 GE research and manufacturing facilities, and met over 250,000 people. During that time, he would also speak at other forums such as Rotary clubs and Moose lodges, presenting views on economic progress that in form and content were often similar to what he said in introductions, segues, and closing comments on the show as a spokesman for GE. Reagan, who would later be known as "The Great Communicator" because of his oratorical ability, often credited these engagements as helping him develop his public-speaking abilities.

== Television guest stars ==
Among the guest stars on the anthology were:

- Bud Abbott
- Edie Adams
- Nick Adams
- Claude Akins
- Eddie Albert
- Leon Ames
- Edward Andrews
- Fred Astaire
- Phyllis Avery
- Parley Baer
- Raymond Bailey
- Patricia Barry
- Anne Baxter
- Fred Beir
- Bea Benaderet
- Jack Benny
- Whit Bissell
- Joan Blondell
- Ray Bolger
- Ward Bond
- Scott Brady
- Neville Brand
- Ernest Borgnine
- Stephen Boyd
- Diane Brewster
- Charles Bronson
- Sally Brophy
- Edgar Buchanan
- Terry Burnham (3 appearances)
- Michael Burns
- Francis X. Bushman
- Red Buttons
- Macdonald Carey
- Jack Carson
- Jack Cassidy
- Gower Champion
- Marge Champion
- George Chandler
- Lon Chaney Jr.
- Phyllis Coates
- Lee J. Cobb
- Claudette Colbert
- Ronald Colman
- Chuck Connors
- Richard Conte
- Russ Conway
- Ellen Corby
- Lou Costello
- Joseph Cotten
- Jerome Cowan
- Bob Crane
- Joan Crawford
- Hume Cronyn
- Tony Curtis
- Bette Davis
- Sammy Davis Jr.
- Jim Davis
- James Dean
- Richard Denning
- Elinor Donahue
- Ann Doran
- Dan Duryea
- John Ericson
- Bill Erwin
- Richard Eyer
- William Fawcett
- Frank Ferguson
- Nina Foch
- Joan Fontaine
- Eduard Franz
- Robert Fuller
- Eva Gabor
- Zsa Zsa Gabor
- Judy Garland
- Greer Garson
- Anthony George
- George Gobel
- Billy Gray
- Virginia Gregg
- Virginia Grey
- Kevin Hagen
- Alan Hale Jr.
- Brooke Hayward
- Barbara Hale
- Darryl Hickman
- Ed Hinton
- Dennis Holmes
- Skip Homeier
- Ron Howard
- Gary Hunley
- Kim Hunter
- Burl Ives
- Victor Jory
- Allyn Joslyn
- Louis Jourdan
- Boris Karloff
- Joseph Kearns
- Ricky Kelman
- Stan Kenton
- Ernie Kovacs
- Otto Kruger
- Nancy Kulp
- Alan Ladd
- Michael Landon
- Joi Lansing
- Keith Larsen
- Charles Laughton
- Piper Laurie
- Cloris Leachman
- Art Linkletter
- Myrna Loy
- Dayton Lummis
- Carol Lynley
- Dorothy Malone
- Flip Mark
- Strother Martin
- Scott Marlowe
- Nora Marlowe
- E. G. Marshall
- Lee Marvin (record 7 appearances)
- Chico Marx
- Groucho Marx
- Harpo Marx
- Raymond Massey
- Walter Matthau
- Tyler MacDuff
- Gisele MacKenzie
- Fred MacMurray
- George Macready
- Kevin McCarthy
- John McIntire
- Eve McVeagh
- Patrick McVey
- Tyler McVey
- Joyce Meadows
- Burgess Meredith
- Gary Merrill
- Robert Middleton
- Vera Miles
- Ray Milland
- Ewing Mitchell
- George Montgomery
- Rita Moreno
- Dennis Morgan
- Read Morgan
- Audie Murphy
- Burt Mustin
- Leslie Nielsen
- Lloyd Nolan
- Dan O'Herlihy
- J. Pat O'Malley
- Geraldine Page
- Barbara Parkins
- Neva Patterson
- John Payne
- Larry Pennell
- Suzanne Pleshette
- Judson Pratt
- Vincent Price
- Nancy Davis Reagan
- Jason Robards Sr.
- Ruth Roman
- George Sanders
- Karen Sharpe
- Robert F. Simon
- Dean Stockwell
- Everett Sloane
- Stella Stevens
- Jimmy Stewart
- Nick Stewart
- Olive Sturgess
- Hope Summers
- Gloria Talbott
- Rod Taylor
- Phyllis Thaxter
- Gene Tierney
- Audrey Totter
- Harry Townes
- Claire Trevor
- Lurene Tuttle
- Gary Vinson
- Beverly Washburn
- David Wayne
- Christine White
- Jesse White
- Cornel Wilde
- Rhys Williams
- Natalie Wood
- Fay Wray
- Will Wright
- Jane Wyman
- Ed Wynn
- Keenan Wynn

== Reagan fired by General Electric ==
Michael Reagan, adopted son of Ronald Reagan and Jane Wyman, contends that Attorney General of the United States Robert F. Kennedy pressured GE to cancel The General Electric Theater or at least to fire Reagan as the host if the program were to continue. The series was not dropped because of low ratings but political intervention, the younger Reagan still maintains.

Don Herbert, a television personality well known as the host of Watch Mr. Wizard, appeared as the "General Electric Progress Reporter", adding a scientific touch to the institutional advertising pitch. The show was produced by Revue Studios, whose successor-in-interest, NBC Universal Television, was co-owned by GE.

Following General Electric Theater's cancellation in 1962, the series was replaced in the same time slot by the short-lived GE-sponsored GE True, hosted by Jack Webb.

== Directors ==
- "The Martyr", directed by Jacques Tourneur (1956) (25 min)
- "Into the Night", directed by Jacques Tourneur (1955) (25 min)
- "Aftermath", directed by Jacques Tourneur (1960) (25 min)
- "Star Witness: The Lili Parrish Story", directed by Jacques Tourneur (1961) (25 min)
