= Christine White (actress) =

American actress

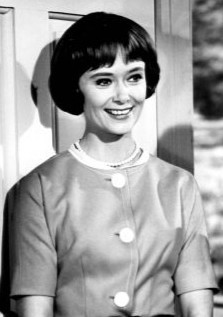
- White in the series Ichabod and Me, 1962
- Born: Christine Lamson White; May 4, 1926; Washington, D.C., U.S.
- Died: April 14, 2013 (aged 86); Washington, D.C., U.S.
- Education: University of North Carolina at Chapel Hill; Catholic University
- Occupation: Actress
- Years active: 1952–1976

Christine Lamson White (May 4, 1926 – April 14, 2013) was an American actress and screenwriter, most noted for her role in "Nightmare at 20,000 Feet", a 1963 episode of the anthology television series The Twilight Zone.

== Early life ==
White was born in Washington, DC, one of two children of Lucia W. and James Andrew White. Following her graduation from high school, Christine attended the University of North Carolina at Chapel Hill, where she majored in English and also began acting in stage productions of the Carolina Playmakers. After obtaining her undergraduate degree in English in Chapel Hill, she returned to Washington, DC, to study and earn a master's degree in speech and drama at Catholic University.

She also studied at the Actors Studio and eventually moved to New York City to further her theatrical career.

== Stage ==
White was active in summer stock theatre, including work at the Cape Cod Playhouse. She was named Most Outstanding Actress at CCP for her portrayal of Millie in Picnic.

In 1956, she replaced Shelley Winters in the Broadway production of A Hatful of Rain after Winters broke her ankle.

== Television ==
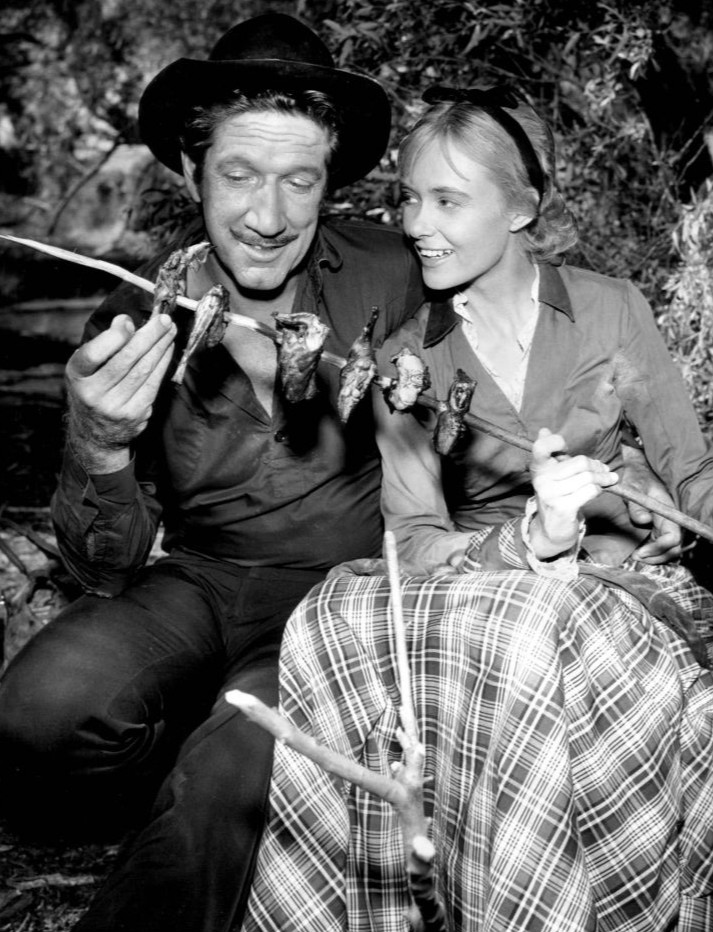
Christine White guest-stars with Richard Boone in a 1958 episode of Have Gun – Will Travel.

By the 1950s, White had left her home in New York City and relocated to Los Angeles, where she began to appear in television shows. Her first role was in 1952 in the series The Web, and she also starred in the horror film Macabre (1958), directed by William Castle.

Over the course of her 24-year career, she performed in over 50 television series, including Bonanza, Have Gun – Will Travel, The Rifleman, The Loretta Young Show, The Untouchables, Father Knows Best, and The Fugitive, and in three episodes of Perry Mason: "The Case of the Blushing Pearls", "The Case of the Curious Bride", and "The Case of the Demure Defendant".

In 1961, White was cast as Kitty in The Twilight Zone episode "The Prime Mover", and later that same year she began performing as a regular character, Abigail Adams, in the situation comedy Ichabod and Me, which CBS broadcast for only one season. In 1963, White returned to work again on The Twilight Zone in the series' iconic episode "Nightmare at 20,000 Feet". Serving as the main supporting character in that episode, she portrays Julia Wilson, the wife of a terrified airplane passenger played by William Shatner.

Author Gore Vidal noted in his memoir Palimpsest that White, "almost invariably got the (television) parts that my friend Joanne Woodward wanted." He continued, "When Joanne received the Academy Award (1957 - The Three Faces of Eve), I wired her, 'Where is Chris White tonight?'"

== Film ==
White's acting was not limited to the stage and television series, as she also appeared in various feature films. Among these was a co-starring role in Man Crazy, produced and released by Security Pictures in 1953. In a smaller role, she portrayed the neglected wife of intense motorcycle cop Charlie McCoy in the 1973 Dirty Harry film sequel, Magnum Force. When family friend Harry Callahan (Clint Eastwood) dropped by, she tried to seduce him.

Later in life, she was an active member of the Evangelical Christian community.

== Bibliography of copyrighted screenplays ==
Year	Title
1978	Omega
1979	Aunt Germania
1980	Just Around the Corner
1981	The Marketplace
1982	Pure Wheat and Wild Rock Honey
1988	Ben Latterbourne

== Death ==
White died on April 14, 2013, at a nursing home in Washington, DC. Her survivors included a number of nieces and nephews.

== Selected filmography ==
Year	Title	Role	Notes
1953	Vice Squad	Miss Easton	Uncredited
1953	Man Crazy	Georgia Daniels	
1957	Panama Sal	Patricia Sheldon	
1958	Alfred Hitchcock Presents	Shelley	Season 3 Episode 15: "Together"
1958	Macabre	Nancy Wetherby Tyloe	
1958	Perry Mason	Nadine	Season 1 Episode 16: "The Case of the Demure Defendant"
1959	Perry Mason	Alice Carson	Season 3 Episode 4: "The Case of the Blushing Pearls"
1960	One Step Beyond	Nancy	Season 2 Episode 21: "The Haunting"
1960	General Electric Theater	Abigail Adams	Episode: "Adam's Apples"
1960	Bonanza	Mariette Blaine	Season 2 Episode 3: "Badge Without Honor"
1960	The Rifleman	Ann Dodd	Season 2 Episode 18: "The Visitor"
1961	Twilight Zone	Kitty Cavanaugh	Season 2 Episode 21: "The Prime Mover"
1961–1962	Ichabod and Me	Abigail Adams	Regular cast, 36 episodes
1963	Twilight Zone	Julia Wilson	Season 5 Episode 3: "Nightmare at 20,000 Feet"
1973	Magnum Force	Carol McCoy	
