= The Prime Mover =

- The Twilight Zone episode
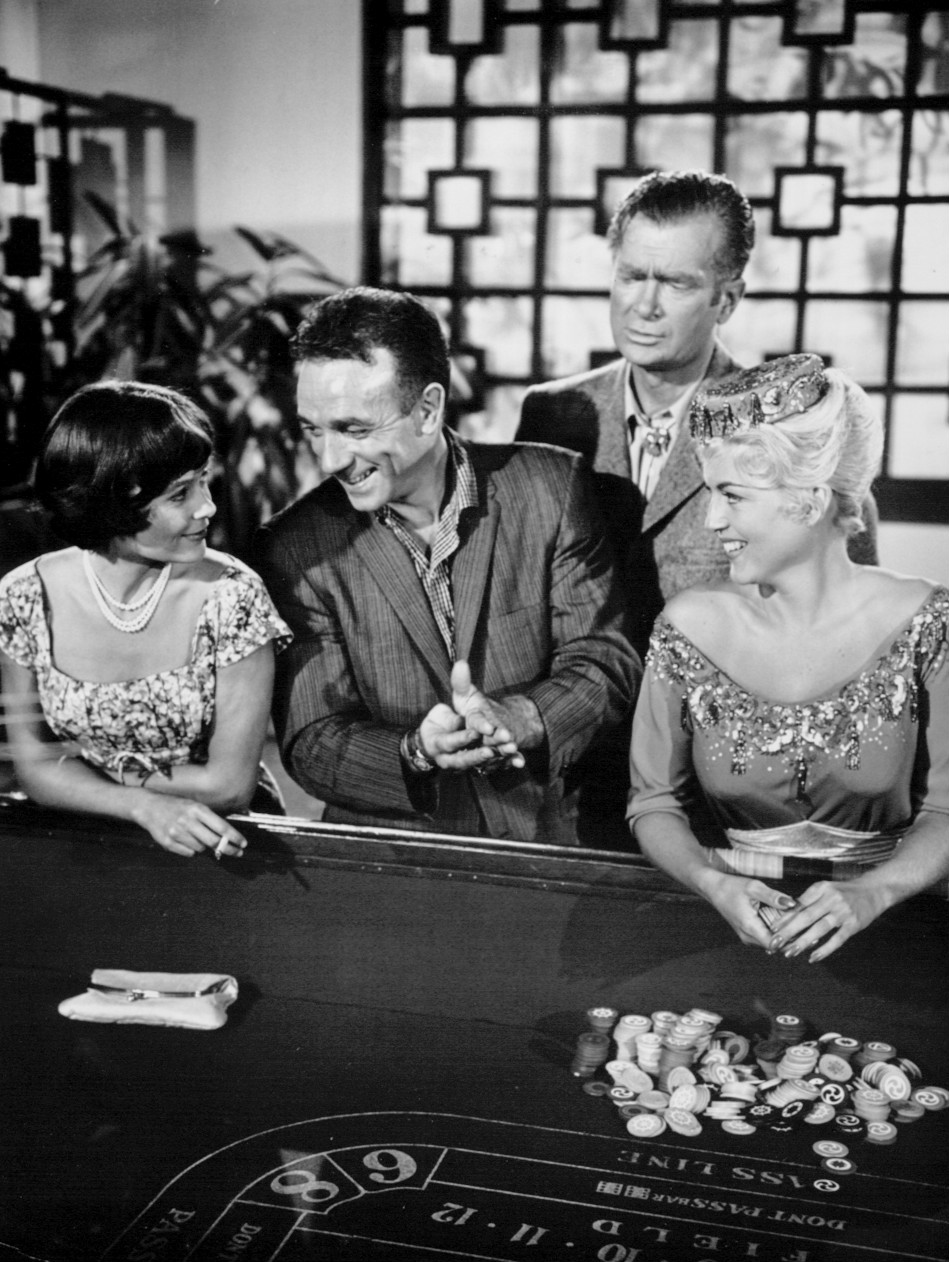
- Christine White, Dane Clark, Buddy Ebsen, and Jane Burgess
- Episode no.: Season 2 Episode 21
- Directed by: Richard L. Bare
- Written by: Charles Beaumont
- Story by: George Clayton Johnson (uncredited)
- Production code: 173-3647
- Original air date: March 24, 1961

Guest appearances
- Dane Clark as Ace Larsen; Buddy Ebsen as Jimbo Cobb; Jane Burgess as Sheila; Christine White as Kitty Cavanaugh

Episode chronology
← Previous "Static"	Next → "Long Distance Call"
- The Twilight Zone (1959 TV series, season 2)

"The Prime Mover" is episode 57 of the American television anthology series The Twilight Zone. It originally aired on March 24, 1961, on CBS.

== Opening narration ==
Portrait of a man who thinks and thereby gets things done. Mr. Jimbo Cobb might be called a prime mover, a talent which has to be seen to be believed. In just a moment, he'll show his friends, and you, how he keeps both feet on the ground and his head in the Twilight Zone.

== Plot ==
Small-time gambler Ace Larsen discovers that his partner, Jimbo Cobb, has telekinetic powers after a car overturns outside their café, and Jimbo moves the car without touching it.

Ace plans to use Jimbo's powers to win big in Las Vegas, and he takes his girlfriend Kitty with them. Ace wins every bet he makes, disregarding Jimbo's headaches from the use of his powers and his growing moral concerns over what they are doing, and accumulates hundreds of thousands of dollars in winnings. Kitty becomes disgusted with Ace's behavior and leaves, so Ace hires the casino's cigarette girl as his companion for the night and has the manager call Phil Nolan, a notorious gangster from Chicago. Ace and Nolan begin a private game of craps, with Ace winning roll after roll. Ignoring Jimbo's interruptions, Ace decides to bet all his money on the next roll, but unexpectedly loses; Jimbo says afterward that his powers had suddenly failed him. The loss awakens Ace to the reality of what he has become, and Jimbo and he have a good laugh over their misfortune and return home with Kitty.

Back at the café, Ace asks Kitty to marry him just as Jimbo drops his broom. She flips a coin, and Ace calls "heads". Without showing Ace the coin or telling him the result of the flip, she decides to accept his proposal. As they embrace, Jimbo picks up the broom telekinetically, revealing he faked his loss of power to snap Ace out of his greed.

== Closing narration ==
Some people possess talent, others are possessed by it. When that happens, the talent becomes a curse. Jimbo Cobb knew, right from the beginning - but before Ace Larsen learned that simple truth, he had to take a short trip - through the Twilight Zone.

== Cast ==
- Dane Clark as Ace Larsen
- Buddy Ebsen as Jimbo Cobb
- Christine White as Kitty Cavanaugh
- William Keene as Desk clerk
- Nesdon Booth as Big Phil Nolan
- Clancy Cooper as Trucker
- Jane Burgess as Sheila

== Production ==
The crash scene reuses stock footage from the 1958 film Thunder Road.

== See also ==
- List of The Twilight Zone (1959 TV series) episodes
