= Joe Mantell =

American actor (1915–2010)

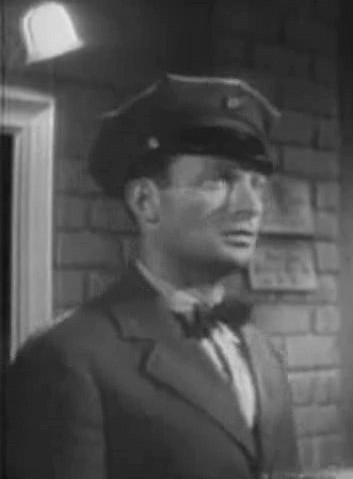
- Mantell in Port of New York, 1949
- Born: Joseph Mantel; December 21, 1915; Brooklyn, New York, U.S.
- Died: September 29, 2010 (aged 94); Tarzana, California, U.S.
- Occupation: Actor
- Years active: 1949–1990
- Spouse: Mary Mantell (?-2010) (his death)
- Children: 3

Joe Mantell (né Joseph Mantel; December 21, 1915 – September 29, 2010) was an American film and television actor. He was nominated for an Academy Award for Best Supporting Actor for his role as best friend Angie in the 1955 film Marty, which he reprised from the 1953 live television play of the same name.

== Early life ==
Mantel was born in the Brooklyn borough of New York City to Jewish immigrant parents from the Kingdom of Galicia, a region in Eastern Europe controlled by the Emperor of Austria. His father was a butcher, the family name originally was spelled Mantel and accented on the first syllable, but at the beginning of his acting career, Mantell added the extra "L" and changed the pronunciation to "Man-TELL".

He served in the army during the World War II.

== Career ==
Early in his career, Mantell worked on Paddy Chayefsky television plays directed by Delbert Mann for The Philco Television Playhouse, including Arnold in The Bachelor Party and as Angie, best friend of the title character, in the 1953 live broadcast of Marty. He also appeared in the anti-censorship episode "Storm Center" of the Westinghouse Desilu Playhouse, as well as the 1956 film adaptation by Daniel Taradash.

In 1955, Mantell reprised the role of Angie in the film adaptation of Marty, for which he was nominated for the Academy Award for Best Supporting Actor.

Mantell was featured in the pilot of the crime drama, The Untouchables, starring Robert Stack that originally aired as a 2 part episode of the WDP. He later guest-starred in The Untouchables series itself, in the 2 part episode, "The Unhired Assassin", where he played Giuseppe Zangara, the would-be assassin of Franklin Delano Roosevelt who ended up accidentally assassinating Chicago Mayor Anton Cermak instead.

Mantell appeared frequently in series television, including two episodes each of The Twilight Zone: "Nervous Man in a Four Dollar Room" (in a starring role) and "Steel" (co-starring with Lee Marvin); The Man from U.N.C.L.E., Ironside, and Maude. Mantell also appeared as a betrayed husband in the "Guilty Witness" episode of Alfred Hitchcock Presents.

He had a recurring role from 1961 to 1962 as Ernie Briggs in six episodes of the CBS sitcom, Pete and Gladys, starring Harry Morgan and Cara Williams. Mantell also starred in season one, episode five ("Far from the Brave") of the TV series Combat! and in a 1963 episode of the sitcom Don't Call Me Charlie!. From 1967 to 1969 Mantell appeared five times on Mannix, four of which were in his recurring role of private detective Albie Loos.

Mantell had a small but pivotal role in the gas station scene of Alfred Hitchcock's 1963 film The Birds. In the 1974 film Chinatown, he played Lawrence Walsh, associate of private eye Jake Gittes, and delivered the film's famous last line, "Forget it, Jake, it's Chinatown." Mantell reprised the character of Walsh in the 1990 film The Two Jakes.

== Personal life ==
He and his wife, Mary, had two daughters and a son.

He retired from acting in 1990 and on September 29, 2010, died in Tarzana, California, at the age of 94.

== Partial filmography ==
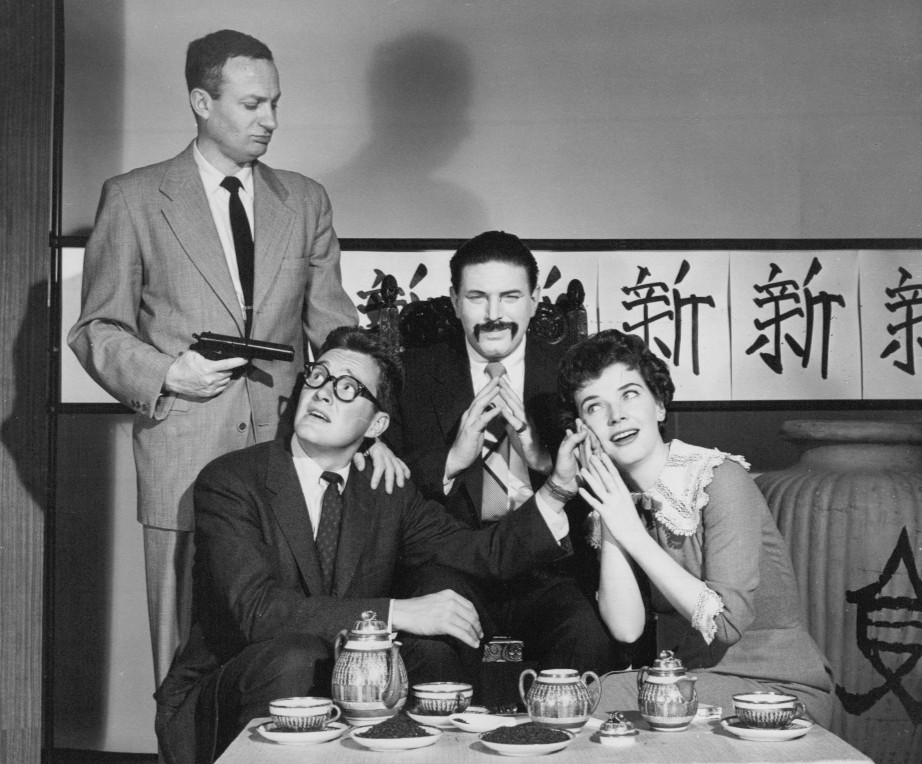
Joe Mantell holds a gun on Orson Bean, Theodore Bikel and Polly Bergen in "San Francisco Fracas", an episode of The Elgin Hour (1955)

Year	Title	Role	Notes
1949	The Undercover Man	Newsboy	Uncredited
1949	Barbary Pirate	Dexter Freeman	
1949	Port of New York	Messenger	Uncredited
1949	And Baby Makes Three	Newsboy	Uncredited
1953	Marty	Angie	Live television play
1955	Alfred Hitchcock Presents	Stanley Crane	Episode: "Guilty Witness"
1955	Marty	Angie	nominated for Academy Award for Best Supporting Actor
1956	Storm Center	George Slater	
1957	Alfred Hitchcock Presents	(Lodge) Brother Harry Brown	Episode: "The Indestructible Mr. Weems"
1957	Beau James	Bernie Williams, Broadway Producer	
1957	The Sad Sack	Private Stan Wenaslawsky	
1958	Onionhead	Harry 'Doc' O'Neal	
1960	The Crowded Sky	Louis Capelli	
1960	The Twilight Zone	Jackie "John" Rhoades	Episode: "Nervous Man in a Four Dollar Room"
1963	The Twilight Zone	Pole	Episode: "Steel"
1963	The Birds	Traveling Salesman at Diner's Bar	
1966	Mister Buddwing	first Cab Driver	
1970	Kelly's Heroes	General's Aide	Uncredited
1974	Chinatown	Lawrence Walsh	
1984	Blame It on the Night	Attorney	
1985	Movers & Shakers	Larry	
1990	The Two Jakes	Lawrence Walsh	
