= Bell, Book and Candle (play) =

1950 Broadway play by John Van Druten

- Written by: John Van Druten
- Characters: Gillian Holroyd; Shepherd Henderson; Aunt Queenie; Nicky Holroyd; Sidney Redlitch
- Subject: Gillian Holroyd, a witch, casts a spell over Shepherd Henderson, a publisher. He falls head over heels in love with her, but witches, unfortunately, cannot fall in love.
- Genre: Comedy
- Setting: Gillian Holroyd's Apartment in Murray Hill, New York City.

Premiere
- Date premiered: November 14, 1950
- Place premiered: Ethel Barrymore Theatre, New York City

Bell, Book and Candle is a 1950 Broadway play by John Van Druten. The original production was directed by John Van Druten with scenic and lighting design by George C. Jenkins, costumes by Anna Hill Johnstone with additional costumes exclusively designed for actress Lilli Palmer by Valentina. The play opened at the Ethel Barrymore Theater on November 14, 1950 and ran for 233 performances before closing on June 2, 1951.

Following the close of the original Broadway production, a U.S. national tour of the play in 1952–53 starred Rosalind Russell and then Joan Bennett.

A later West End production at London's Phoenix Theatre opened on October 5, 1954 and ran for 485 performances, closing on December 3, 1955. It was presented by H.M. Tennent Ltd and was directed by Rex Harrison, with settings by Alan Tagg and costumes by Pierre Balmain. This version relocated the action from Manhattan to Knightsbridge and changed the forename of the leading male character from Shep to Tony.

== Original Broadway cast (1950–51) ==
- Shepherd Henderson — Rex Harrison
- Gillian Holroyd — Lilli Palmer
- Miss Holroyd (Aunt Queenie) — Jean Adair
- Sidney Redlitch — Larry Gates
- Nicky Holroyd — Scott McKay (actor)

== Original West End cast (1954–55) ==
- Anthony Henderson — Rex Harrison
- Gillian Holroyd — Lilli Palmer (from September 21, 1955: Joan Greenwood)
- Miss Holroyd — Athene Seyler
- Sidney Redlitch — Wilfrid Lawson (from January 24, 1955: Esmond Knight)
- Nicholas Holroyd — David Evans

== Summary ==
Gillian Holroyd is one of the few modern people who can actually cast spells and perform feats of supernaturalism. She casts a spell over an unattached publisher, Shepherd Henderson, partly to keep him away from a rival and partly because she is attracted to him. He falls head over heels in love with her at once and wants to marry her. But witches, unfortunately, cannot fall in love, and this minute imperfection leads into a number of difficulties. Ultimately, the lady breaks off with her companions in witchery, preferring the normal and human love offered her by the attractive publisher. But before the happy conclusion of the romance, Gillian comes very near to losing him—but doesn’t.

Regarding the play itself, author Druten stated in an interview: “Originally Bell, Book and Candle was a rather more serious play, but then I asked myself what constitutes witchcraft ... and I felt the answer lies in the fact that witches primarily seem to exist for their own self-gratification. However, one has to stop living in terms of ‘self’ if aspects of love are ever to be realized.”

== Scenes ==
The action passes throughout in Gillian Holroyd’s apartment in the Murray Hill district of New York City.

Act I
Scene 1: Christmas Eve
Scene 2: About three hours later
Act II
Two weeks later
Act III
Scene 1: Four hours later.
Scene 2: Two months later.

== Title ==
The origin of the phrase “Bell, Book and Candle” dates back to the 14th century. In Old English it first appeared as: “Curced in kirc an sal ai be wid candil, boke, and bell” and was used in excommunication ceremonies or “anathema”. William Shakespeare used the phrase in his 1595 play King John: “Bell, book, and candle shall not drive me back, When gold and silver becks me to come on.”

== Notable revivals ==
- From 1951-52, between the Broadway and West End productions, Evelyn Laye and Frank Lawton starred in a major tour of the play in Australia and New Zealand, with Leity Craydon, John Edmund and William Rees also in the cast. The tour opened at the Theatre Royal, Sydney on November 3, 1951.
- The H.M. Tennent UK tour that immediately followed the 1954–55 West End production, again directed by Rex Harrison, featured Kay Kendall as Gillian, Robert Flemyng as Tony, Viola Lyel as Miss Holroyd, David Evans as Nicholas and Lloyd Pearson as Sidney. This version was jokingly referred to in showbusiness circles as 'Bell, Book and Kendall'.
- Arena Players Repertory Company — East Farmingdale, NY (1985). Cast: Barbara Carlson — Gillian Holroyd, Allen McRae — Shepherd Henderson, Edith Traynor — Miss Holroyd, Don Frame — Nicky Holroyd, Robert Rosin — Sidney Redlitch.
- San Francisco Playhouse — San Francisco, CA (2012). Cast: Lauren English — Gillian Holroyd, William Connell — Shepherd Henderson, Zehra Berkman — Miss Holroyd, Scott Cox — Nicky Holroyd, Louis Parnell — Sidney Redlitch.
- Hartford Stage — Hartford, CT (2012). Cast: Kate MacCluggage — Gillian Holroyd, Robert Eli — Shepherd Henderson, Ruth Williamson — Miss Holroyd, Michael Keyloun — Nicky Holroyd, Gregor Paslawsky — Sidney Redlitch.

A controversy erupted in 2015 citing set plagiarism, after a new production of the play was launched at Theatre Works New Milford in New Milford, Connecticut. The theater company immediately stopped all performances after it was noted that their set design was strikingly similar to that of the critically acclaimed revival in 2012 at Hartford Stage. Theatre Works New Milford acknowledged the similarity in an apology letter to Alexander Dodge and Darko Tresnjak, who originally designed the sets for the 2012 production, stating that their production was “inspired” by their designs.

== Film adaptation ==
The 1958 film adaptation had a screenplay by Daniel Taradash, directed by Richard Quine, starring James Stewart as Shep, Kim Novak as Gillian, Jack Lemmon as Nicky, Ernie Kovacs as Redlitch, Elsa Lanchester as Miss Holroyd and Hermione Gingold as Mrs De Pass (a character only mentioned in the play).

== In popular culture ==
Screenwriter Sol Saks was influenced by the 1958 film Bell, Book and Candle (as well as the 1942 film I Married a Witch) when creating the popular TV series Bewitched.
