= Steel (The Twilight Zone) =

- The Twilight Zone episode
- Episode no.: Season 5 Episode 2
- Directed by: Don Weis
- Written by: Richard Matheson
- Based on: "Steel" by Richard Matheson
- Production code: 2602
- Original air date: October 4, 1963

Guest appearances
- Lee Marvin: Tim "Steel" Kelly; Joe Mantell: Pole; Tipp McClure: Battling Maxo; Chuck Hicks: Maynard Flash; Merritt Bohn; Frank London

Episode chronology
← Previous "In Praise of Pip"	Next → "Nightmare at 20,000 Feet"
- The Twilight Zone (1959 TV series) (season 5)

"Steel" is an episode of the American television anthology series The Twilight Zone. Set in the near future, its premise is that human professional boxing has been banned and replaced by android boxing. The story follows a once-famous human boxer who works as a manager for an antiquated android while struggling to come to grips with his career having been taken over by machines.

The episode is based on the short story of the same name by Richard Matheson first published in the May 1956 issue of The Magazine of Fantasy & Science Fiction.

== Opening narration ==
Sports item, circa 1974: Battling Maxo, B2, heavyweight, accompanied by his manager and handler, arrives in Maynard, Kansas, for a scheduled six-round bout. Battling Maxo is a robot, or, to be exact, an android, definition: 'an automaton resembling a human being.' Only these automatons have been permitted in the ring since prizefighting was legally abolished in 1968. This is the story of that scheduled six-round bout, more specifically the story of two men shortly to face that remorseless truth: that no law can be passed which will abolish cruelty or desperate need—nor, for that matter, blind animal courage. Location for the facing of said truth: a small, smoke-filled arena just this side - of the Twilight Zone.

== Plot ==
In the near-future year of 1974, boxing between human fighters has been abolished and the sport is dominated by fighting robots. Former boxer Timothy "Steel" Kelly manages a robot called "Battling Maxo", an older model that is no longer in demand. Kelly and his partner, Pole, have used the last of their money to get to the fight venue. They are being given this chance because one of the scheduled fighters was damaged in transport. Kelly has to assure fight promoter Nolan and his assistant Maxwell that Maxo will be able to fight. After they leave Nolan's office, Kelly and Pole argue repeatedly over Maxo's fitness. Kelly claims Maxo should be able to go through with the fight despite its age and condition. A spring in Maxo's arm fails when they test it, leaving it unable to fight since the part has been discontinued and they do not have a spare.

Kelly decides he will disguise himself as Maxo to collect the money necessary for repairs. Despite a valiant effort, he is unable to damage Maynard Flash, an opponent of a more advanced model than Maxo, even when he lands an unblocked punch directly to the back of its head. He is nearly killed but manages to last the first round. The crowd jeers and boos at "Maxo's" performance.

Afterward, the fight promoter pays Kelly only half of the agreed-on $500 fee due to poor performance. Kelly does not protest to prevent recognition. Badly bruised but stubborn as ever, he tells Pole they will use the money to repair Maxo and get him ready to fight again.

== Closing narration ==
Portrait of a losing side, proof positive that you can't outpunch machinery. Proof also of something else: that no matter what the future brings, man's capacity to rise to the occasion will remain unaltered. His potential for tenacity and optimism continues, as always, to outfight, outpoint and outlive any and all changes made by his society, for which three cheers and a unanimous decision rendered from the Twilight Zone.

== Production ==
This was the first episode sponsored by Procter & Gamble (alternating sponsorship with American Tobacco), who usually "pitched" Crest toothpaste, Lilt Home Permanent, and Prell shampoo, among their other products. Serling was not required to endorse any of P&G's products at the end of their episodes.

Serling, in his narration, had predicted that professional boxing would be outlawed within five years of the episode's airing; at the time, the sport was mired in controversy after Emile Griffith killed his opponent Benny Paret in a nationally televised and particularly brutal 1962 match. With Paret's death at Griffith's hands, as well as the death of Davey Moore from a neck injury sustained in a March 1963 contest, the specter of the sport being outlawed was a realistic possibility at the time "Steel" was broadcast. Serling's prediction did not come to fruition; although boxing declined in popularity in the succeeding years, it has never been outlawed.

Each of the five credited cast members appeared in one other episode — Lee Marvin starred in "The Grave" (October 1961), Joe Mantell starred as "Nervous Man in a Four Dollar Room" (October 1960), Chuck Hicks had an uncredited bit part as a mover in "Ninety Years Without Slumbering" (December 1963, two months after this episode), Merritt Bohn was billed at the bottom of the cast list in a bit part as a truck driver in Twilight Zone's second episode, "One for the Angels" (October 1959) and Frank London was billed third from the end in a bit part as a driver in ""A Penny for Your Thoughts" (February 1961).

== See also ==
- Real Steel, a 2011 American science fiction film also based on Richard Matheson's short story
- "I, (Annoyed Grunt)-Bot", a 2004 episode of The Simpsons with a similar plot
- "Raging Bender" from the second season of Futurama also depicts a hidden human controller of a robotic boxer.
