= The Man in the Bottle =

- The Twilight Zone episode
- Episode no.: Season 2 Episode 2
- Directed by: Don Medford
- Written by: Rod Serling
- Production code: 173-3638
- Original air date: October 7, 1960

Guest appearances
- Luther Adler as Arthur Castle/Adolf Hitler; Vivi Janiss as Edna Castle; Lisa Golm as Mrs. Gumley; Joseph Ruskin as Genie; Olan Soule as IRS agent

Episode chronology
← Previous "King Nine Will Not Return"	Next → "Nervous Man in a Four Dollar Room"
- The Twilight Zone (1959 TV series, season 2)

"The Man in the Bottle" is episode 38 of the American television series The Twilight Zone. It originally aired on October 7, 1960, on CBS.

== Opening narration ==
"Mr. and Mrs. Arthur Castle, gentle and infinitely patient people whose lives have been a hope chest with a rusty lock and a lost set of keys. But in just a moment that hope chest will be opened and an improbable phantom will try to bedeck the drabness of these two people's failure-laden lives with the gold and precious stones of fulfillment. Mr. and Mrs. Arthur Castle, standing on the outskirts and about to enter the Twilight Zone."

== Plot ==
A poor elderly woman visits Arthur Castle, an unsuccessful antiques dealer, bringing a wine bottle she found in a trash can. It has no value, but he buys it for a small amount out of pity. The bottle proves to contain a genie, who offers to grant four wishes to Castle and his wife. They use their first wish to repair a broken glass cabinet, proving the genie's power, and then receive a million dollars in cash upon making their second wish. After they have given tens of thousands away to their friends, an IRS employee visits the shop and presents the Castles with a tax bill that leaves them with only $5 once they pay it.

The genie warns them that every wish has consequences, and that they should think carefully before making their next one. Castle decides that he wants to be in a position of great power, and wishes to be a leader - who cannot be voted out of office - of a modern and powerful country. He is turned into Adolf Hitler and transported to the last days of World War II; he is hiding in the Führerbunker as one of his men brings him a vial of cyanide so he can kill himself. In desperation, he wishes to be returned to his old life and throws the vial to the floor.

In an instant, Castle's final wish is granted, and he is returned to his shop, where the wine bottle shatters on the floor. He and his wife have nothing to show for their experience except a repaired cabinet — which Castle accidentally breaks again as he sweeps up — and a changed perspective on life. After he dumps the pieces of the bottle into a trash can outside, they magically reform into a whole bottle, waiting for someone else to pick it up and release the genie.

== Closing narration ==
A word to the wise, now, to the garbage collectors of the world, to the curio seekers, to the antique buffs, to everyone who would try to coax out a miracle from unlikely places. Check that bottle you're taking back for a two-cent deposit. The genie you save might be your own. Case in point, Mr. and Mrs. Arthur Castle, fresh from the briefest of trips into The Twilight Zone.

== Production notes ==
Luther Adler previously had portrayed Hitler in two 1951 feature films: The Magic Face, a fantasy about a European impersonator who somehow manages to murder Hitler and then assumes his identity, and The Desert Fox, a drama about Erwin Rommel.

Both the 1891 short story "The Bottle Imp" by Robert Louis Stevenson and the 1901 short story "The Monkey's Paw" by W.W. Jacobs feature an object containing a supernatural power that can grant the wishes of its human possessors, indicating that such is a dangerous power to enjoy.

== See also ==
- List of The Twilight Zone (1959 TV series) episodes
