= Don't Bother to Knock =

1952 film by Roy Ward Baker

- Theatrical release poster
- Directed by: Roy Ward Baker
- Screenplay by: Daniel Taradash
- Based on: Mischief (1951 novel) by Charlotte Armstrong
- Produced by: Julian Blaustein
- Starring: Richard Widmark; Marilyn Monroe
- Cinematography: Lucien Ballard
- Edited by: George A. Gittens
- Music by: Lionel Newman
- Distributed by: Twentieth Century-Fox
- Release dates: July 18, 1952 (New York); July 30, 1952 (Los Angeles)
- Running time: 76 minutes
- Country: United States
- Language: English
- Box office: $1.5 million (U.S. rentals)

Don't Bother to Knock is a 1952 American psychological thriller film starring Richard Widmark and Marilyn Monroe. It was directed by Roy Ward Baker, with a screenplay by Daniel Taradash based on the 1951 Charlotte Armstrong novel Mischief.

== Plot ==
New York lounge singer Lyn Lesley is approached by airline pilot Jed Towers, her former boyfriend, who has registered as usual at the McKinley Hotel, where she works. Lyn explains that she sees no future with him, perceiving his coldness to people as his lacking "an understanding heart".

Elevator operator Eddie Forbes arranges for his reticent niece, Nell Forbes, to babysit for Bunny, the child of guests Peter and Ruth Jones, who attend a banquet downstairs. After putting the youngster to bed, Nell tries on Ruth's negligee, jewelry, and perfume. Seeing Nell from his room directly across a courtyard, Jed phones her, but she rebuffs his advances. When Eddie checks up on her, he is appalled to find Nell wearing Ruth's apparel and orders her to take them off. He encourages that she can have such indulgences by finding a boyfriend to replace Philip, a pilot killed in action in World War II. After Eddie leaves, Nell puts Ruth's attire back on, applies her lipstick, and invites Jed over.

Nell lies to Jed, presenting herself as a wealthy globetrotter. Startled on learning that he is a pilot, Nell confides that her boyfriend, Philip, was killed flying a bomber in World War II. Bunny awakens and shatters Nell's charade. Furious, Nell shakes the child and orders her back to bed. Jed comforts the sobbing child, letting her stay up with them. When Bunny leans out an open window, the troubled Nell fights the urge to push the child out. Seeing Nell's attitude, Jed snatches Bunny away, but the incident is witnessed by longtime hotel resident Emma Ballew. Out of Jed's earshot, Nell threatens Bunny, putting her back to bed. Appalled by Nell's behavior, Jed's thoughts return to Lyn, and he begins to leave. Nell begs him not to go. As he is fending off a kiss from her, Jed sees scars on her wrists. Nell confesses that after Philip died, she had tried to kill herself with a razor.

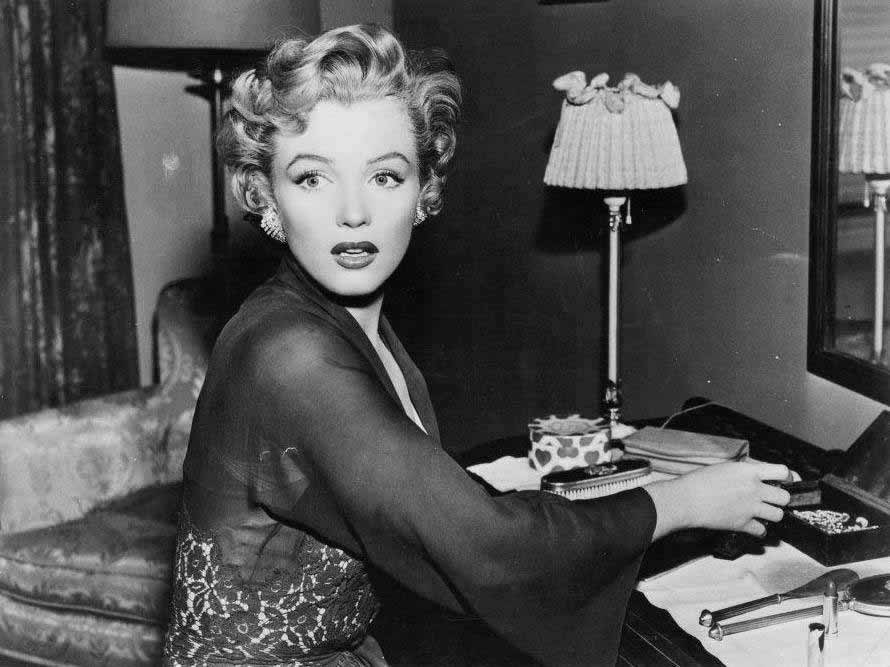
Marilyn Monroe as Nell

When Eddie checks up on Nell after his shift is over, Nell wrangles a reluctant Jed into concealing himself in the bathroom. Irate that Nell is still wearing Ruth's apparel, Eddie orders her to change clothes, then harshly rubs off her lipstick. An enraged Nell accuses Eddie of behaving just like her repressive parents. When Eddie suspects someone is in the bathroom, Nell hits him on the head with a heavy ashtray. While an alarmed Jed tends to Eddie, Nell slips into Bunny's room.

Emma knocks on the door, accompanied by her reluctant husband. Fearing for his job, Eddie urges Jed to hide while Eddie slips into the closet. Jed sneaks into Bunny's room, not noticing in the dark that the child is now bound and gagged. He leaves through a door into the hallway, but the Ballews see him and assume he was an intruder in Nell's room. They alert the hotel detective, and a chase ensues. Increasingly delusional, Nell now believes that Jed is Philip. Locking Eddie in, she again goes into Bunny's room.

At the bar, Jed tells Lyn about Nell. Lyn is pleasantly surprised by his concern. Suddenly realizing that he saw Bunny in the wrong bed, Jed rushes back to the Joneses' room. Ruth arrives back to Bunny's room first, screaming and grappling with Nell. Jed pulls Nell away and unties Bunny. Nell escapes in the confusion when the detective arrives. Eddie explains that Nell spent the previous three years in an Oregon mental institution following her suicide attempt, but she had been deemed cured. In the lobby, Nell steals a razor blade from a sales display. Surrounded by a mob, she holds it at her own throat. Recognizing Nell by Jed's description, Lyn calls her by her name and tries to calm her. Jed then appears and persuades Nell to give the razor to him, and she is taken into custody. Impressed by Jed's empathy, Lyn agrees to a reconciliation. They walk away together hand in hand.

== Cast ==
- Richard Widmark as Jed Towers
- Marilyn Monroe as Nell Forbes
- Anne Bancroft as Lyn Lesley (singing voice by Eve Marley)
- Donna Corcoran as Bunny Jones
- Jeanne Cagney as Rochelle
- Lurene Tuttle as Ruth Jones
- Elisha Cook Jr. as Eddie Forbes
- Jim Backus as Peter Jones
- Verna Felton as Emma Ballew
- Willis B. Bouchey as Joe
- Don Beddoe as Mr. Ballew

== Production ==
Producer Julian Blaustein and director Roy Baker wanted to title the film Whistle Bait, but the title was rejected by the Breen Office. Twentieth Century-Fox had planned to title the film Night Without Sleep but became concerned about the implications of the title appearing alongside Monroe's name, necessitating the change to Don't Bother to Knock. A separate film titled Night Without Sleep, also directed by Roy Baker, was released soon after Don't Bother to Knock.

Production began on December 3, 1951.

== Reception ==
In a contemporary review for The New York Times, critic Bosley Crowther wrote:

The story is that Marilyn Monroe is being groomed by Twentieth Century-Fox for razzle-dazzle stardom on the assumption, we are told, that she is the hottest number to hit Hollywood in years. There may be some grounds for that assumption, but they also expect her to act, they're going to have to give her a lot of lessons under an able and patient coach. At least, that's one man's opinion after seeing "Don't Bother to Knock," a little thing in which the lady has the key role ... To be sure, the role is one that Bette Davis or even Olivia de Havilland might have a little trouble getting over without a running start ... As we say, it would take some doing, even by a practiced psychopath. It requires a good deal to play a person who is strangely jangled in the head. And unfortunately, all the equipment that Miss Monroe has to handle the job are a childishly blank expression and a provokingly feeble, hollow voice. With these she makes a game endeavor to pull something out of the role, but it looks as though she and her director, Roy Baker, were not quite certain what. This confusion transmits to the audience. It laughs when it shouldn't at the film. And it certainly is indicated in Mr. Widmark's performance of his role. What might have been fairly suspenseful becomes merely comical when he shies away from Miss Monroe's fumbling like a fellow slipping on a banana. peel. ... All in all, Miss Monroe needs much more practice than she shows in "Don't Bother to Knock." This is said with full regard for that petition, but we think you and she should be told.

Critic Philip K. Scheuer of the Los Angeles Times wrote:

Whatever else "Don't Bother to Knock" may or may not do, I feel fairly safe in saying that it will cause you as uncomfortable a session (76 minutes) as the movies have devised in recent weeks. ... The uncomfortableness, which is all-pervading, seems to grow out of the subject matter and envelop writer, director, cameraman and actors, who jointly and severally appear to be in the grip of a slow-motion blues. An incident has been stretched tight-thin for the purpose of suspense; and I would be unjust if I denied that it creates any. The method, however, is so deliberate—every movement being magnified into something of portentous significance—that the spectator gradually becomes conscious of a strain, both on himself and the somnambulistic figures before him and begins to wonder about it. Is it legitimate or a technical trick, a "slice of life" or a phony? ... Reactions to "Don't Bother to Knock" will be widely divergent; my final one is that its timing—in conception, execution and as an introductory vehicle for Miss Monroe—is away off.

The reviewer for the New York Post was generally pleased with the film's individual performances, but panned its plot and structure. He described Monroe as “surprisingly good”, and Widmark “terse, decisive and efficient, in veteran pilot style.” Of the work's direction, plot, and portrayals he wrote: “The picture’s suspense sequences are fairly effective both in gradual build-up and climaxes, but the conclusion, implying that all this had taken place merely to awake Widmark to his love for the singer, reduces the film to trifling proportions. The plot structure is painfully mechanical and obvious. Only characterizations and the psychotic continuities lend it temporary semblance of solidity.”

The Albany Times-Union film critic was unenthusiastic: “Having whooped the undeniable physical assets of Marilyn Monroe from the rooftops, her home studio seems bent now upon telling the world that its blond property is also geared for heavy dramatic acting. The effort put forth…is something less than overwhelming, and seems oddly unnecessary. Why not just let her just be Marilyn Monroe, instead of a psychotic menace?....Miss Monroe walks through the picture as if she had been hit on the head….The action, transpiring entirely in the hotel, never gets higher than the eighth floor…..The picture has a brunette stranger, Ann Bancroft, as a nightclub songstress who jilts Widmark, takes him back the same evening. Not sensational—but neither is she psychotic.”

The film's reputation has improved since its release, with many modern critics considering Monroe's performance as initially underrated, even some of her best acting according to some fans.

Film critic Dennis Schwartz gave the film a mostly positive 2011 review, and was especially enthusiastic over Monroe's performance. He wrote, "Wacko psychological thriller, set entirely in a NYC hotel, and helmed without urgency by Roy Ward Baker (The Vault of Horror/Asylum/Scars of Dracula). It lacks emotional depth, but is diverting as it gives off nervous energy and remains watchable throughout. Marilyn Monroe was in 12 previous films, but this was her first co-starring headliner role. Playing someone mentally deranged, Marilyn wonderfully channels how her mentally troubled mom acted and gives a believable performance (she's the best reason for seeing this forgettable pic). It's based on a novel by Charlotte Armstrong and is written by Daniel Taradash."
