= Bell, Book and Candle =

1958 film by Richard Quine

- Theatrical release poster
- Directed by: Richard Quine
- Screenplay by: Daniel Taradash
- Based on: Bell, Book and Candle by John Van Druten
- Produced by: Julian Blaustein
- Starring: James Stewart; Kim Novak; Jack Lemmon; Ernie Kovacs; Hermione Gingold; Elsa Lanchester; Janice Rule
- Cinematography: James Wong Howe
- Edited by: Charles Nelson
- Music by: George Duning
- Production companies: Phoenix Productions, Inc.
- Distributed by: Columbia Pictures
- Release date: November 11, 1958
- Running time: 106 minutes
- Country: United States
- Language: English
- Box office: $2.5 million (US and Canada rentals)

Bell, Book and Candle is a 1958 American supernatural romantic comedy film directed by Richard Quine from a screenplay by Daniel Taradash, based on the 1950 Broadway play by John Van Druten and starring James Stewart, Kim Novak, Jack Lemmon, and Ernie Kovacs. Novak portrays a witch who casts a spell on her neighbor, played by Stewart. The supporting cast features Lemmon, Kovacs, Hermione Gingold, Elsa Lanchester, and Janice Rule. The film is considered Stewart's final role as a romantic lead.

It was acknowledged as part of the inspiration for the television series Bewitched.

== Plot ==
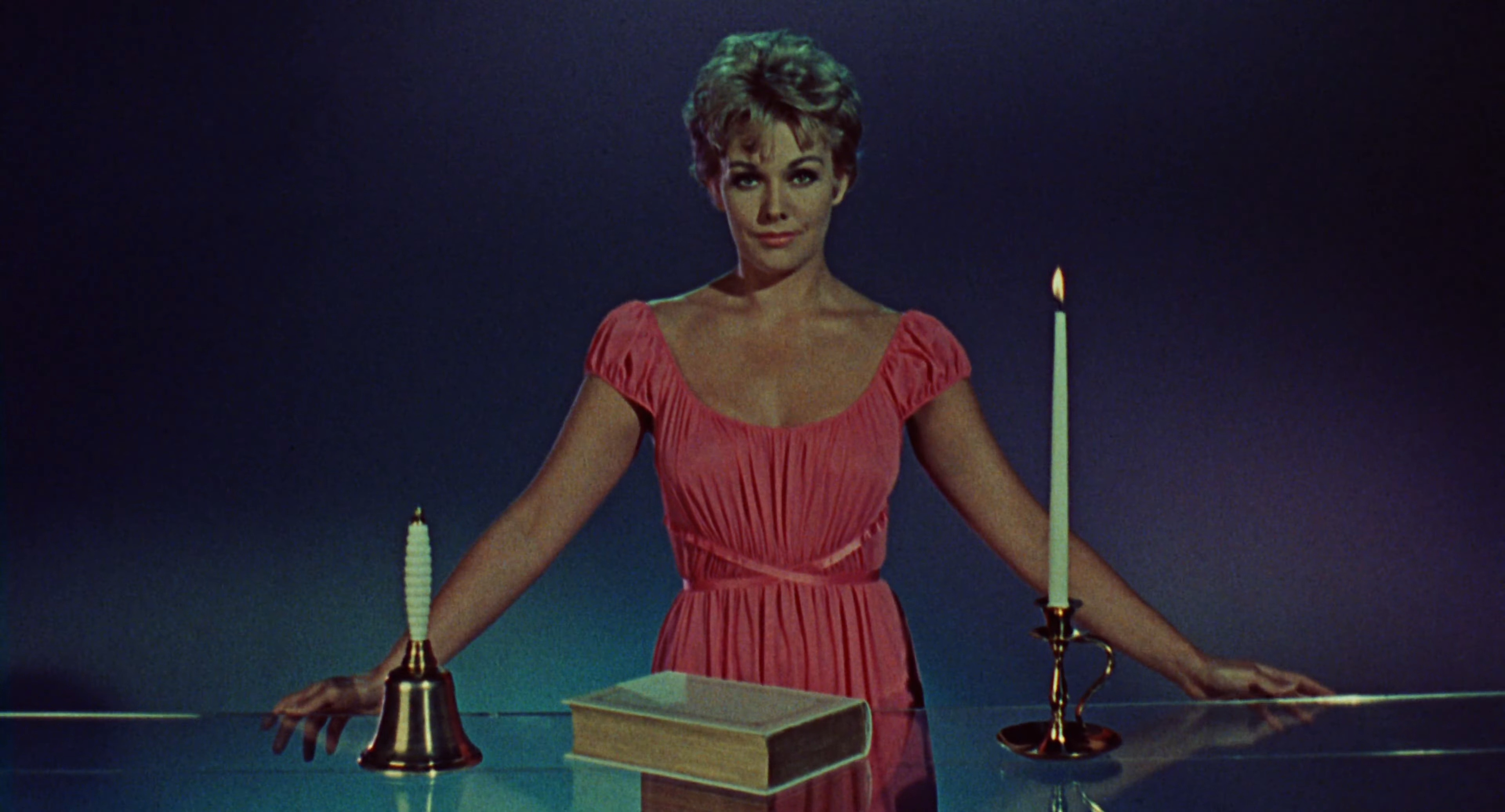
Kim Novak as Gillian

Gillian Holroyd, a free spirit with a penchant for going barefoot, is the owner of an art store in Greenwich Village that deals in rare ethnological (magical) masks, and a secret witch. Bored with her routine life, she takes an interest in her new neighbor, publisher Shep Henderson.

On Christmas Eve, Shep arrives home to discover Gillian's aunt Queenie (also a witch) inside his apartment. Offended at being ushered out, Queenie hexes Shep's telephone. He visits Gillian to use her phone, and they discuss the best-selling book Magic in Mexico and his desire to meet the author, Sidney Redlitch. As Shep leaves, Queenie invites them both to the Zodiac Club. Having perused his letters, Queenie reports to Gillian that Shep is engaged, but encourages her to use magic to pursue him anyway.

That night, Shep brings his fiancée Merle Kittridge to the Zodiac Club, where they meet-up with Gillian, aunt Queenie, and Gillian's brother Nicky, a bongo drum-playing warlock. Gillian recognizes Merle as her malicious college nemesis, who was terrified of thunderstorms (which occurred strangely often during their college feuds). Nicky torments her with heavy drumming, while the club band plays "Stormy Weather", until Merle flees, followed by Shep.

The Holroyd family returns to Gillian's apartment to exchange Christmas gifts; Nicky gives Gillian an enchanted liquid, with which they attempt to summon Redlitch, but are cut short when Shep arrives. Queenie and Nicky depart, and Shep reveals that he and Merle are eloping later that day. Gillian uses her Siamese cat and familiar, Pyewacket, to cast a love spell on Shep, who immediately becomes enamored of her.

After spending all night out on the town with Gillian, the infatuated Shep breaks up with Merle. Redlitch arrives at Shep's office, having been magically compelled to come to New York and meet him; Redlitch explains that he is researching witches in New York City for his next book. The oblivious Shep introduces him to the Holroyds, and Nicky later demonstrates his powers to Redlitch; Nicky offers him access to the witch community in exchange for half the book's profits. Revelling in her romance with Shep, Gillian is torn when he proposes to her; although witches lose their magic if they fall in love, she agrees to marry him.

Gillian and Nicky quarrel about his exposing their world to Redlitch, and in turn about her preparing to renounce magic to marry Shep. Using her powers to make Shep lose all interest in publishing Nicky and Redlitch's book, Gillian confesses to Shep that she is a witch and their relationship is the result of her spell. Shep refuses to believe her, but runs into Queenie, who confirms Gillian's version of events. Believing she enchanted him purely to spite Merle, Shep leaves Gillian heartbroken. He goes to Nicky, who brings him to Bianca de Pass, a powerful witch, who brews a potion for him to drink that breaks Gillian's love-spell.

Shep confronts Gillian and cruelly presents her with a broom. She threatens to curse Merle, but Pyewacket runs away from her before she can do it. Shep, in turn, is unable to convince Merle that he was bewitched. Queenie finds Pyewacket, but the cat rejects Gillian, who is now able to cry – proof she has fallen in love and is no longer a witch.

Weeks later, Mrs. de Pass has become Redlitch's new collaborator, and Queenie confides to Nicky that she is worried about Gillian. Pyewacket is sent to Shep's office, and he returns the cat to Gillian at her transformed store (now filled with seashell art and flowers instead of the masks). She explains that Pyewacket is no longer her cat; Shep realizes from Gillian's tears that she truly loves him, and they reconcile with a passionate kiss. Watching through the window, Queenie is delighted and Nicky is disgusted.

As the scene finale, the streetlights all suddenly extinguish. The camera turns to reveal the culprit perched atop a street lamp: Pyewacket.

== Cast ==
- James Stewart as Shep Henderson
- Kim Novak as Gillian Holroyd
- Jack Lemmon as Nicky Holroyd
- Ernie Kovacs as Sidney Redlitch
- Hermione Gingold as Bianca de Pass
- Elsa Lanchester as Aunt Queenie Holroyd
- Janice Rule as Merle Kittridge

== Production ==
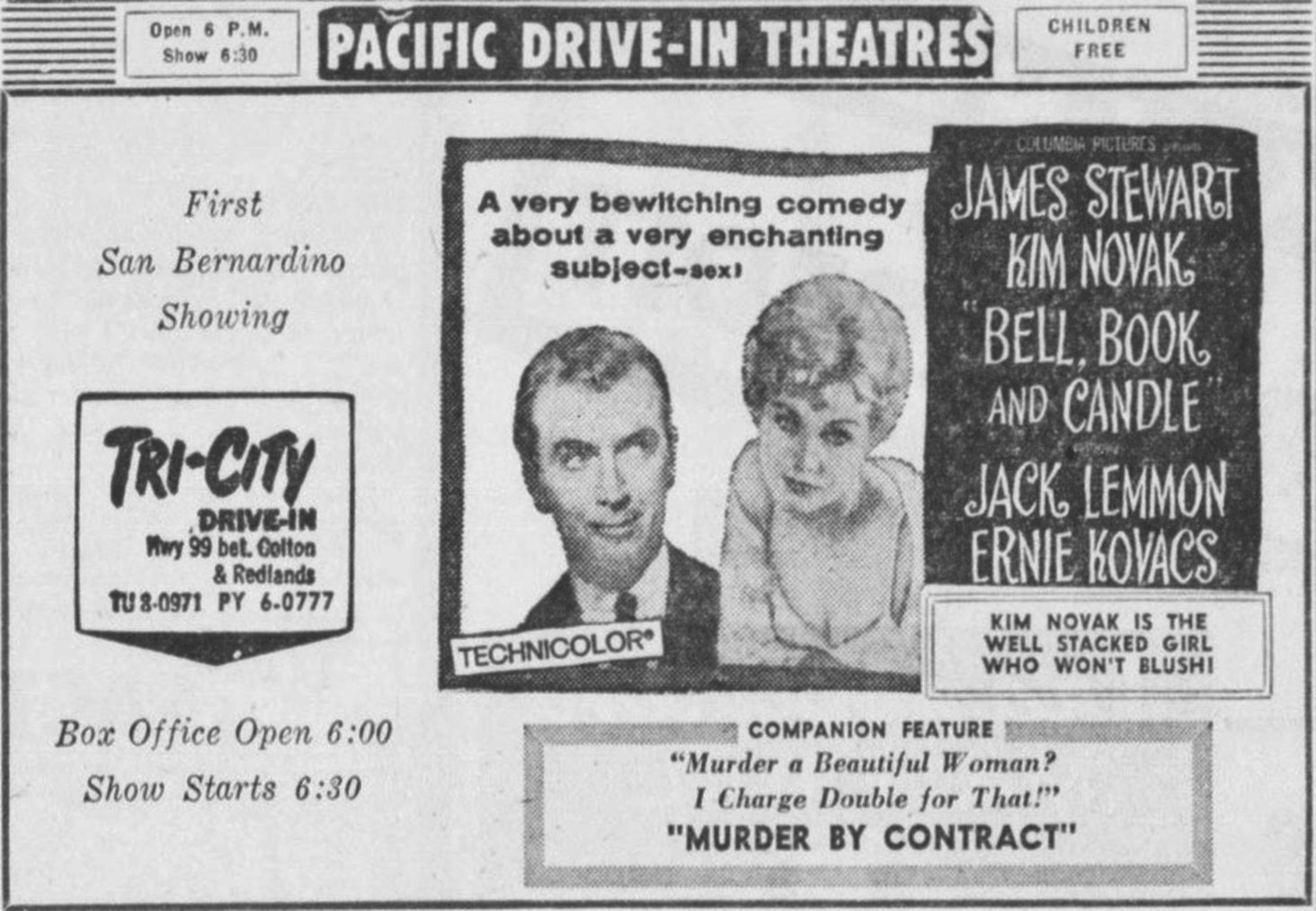
Drive-in advertisement from 1959

David O. Selznick purchased the rights to Van Druten's play in 1953, (Note: Selznick's former wife Irene produced the play on Broadway.) planning to cast his wife, Jennifer Jones, in the part of Gil. At the urging of Daniel Taradash and Julian Blaustein, Columbia purchased the property from Selznick in 1956.

Taradash, who had adapted From Here to Eternity (1953) for Columbia with great success, augmented the story slightly by incorporating characters who are only names in the play (notably Mrs. De Pass, and Shep's fiancée Merle) and expanding the action to locations beyond Gil's apartment.

For the lead roles, Taradash and Blaustein hoped to get Rex Harrison and Lilli Palmer, who had starred in the play, but Columbia chief Harry Cohn decided on Kim Novak for the female lead. Novak was on loan to Paramount making Vertigo and the scheduling conflict put Harrison out of consideration as well. Taradash and Blaustein also suggested Cary Grant and Grace Kelly as the leads and Alexander Mackendrick to direct; Kelly got married and ended her career at its height, however, and there were creative differences between the studio and both Grant and Mackendrick. Since the arrangement with Paramount for Novak's appearance in Vertigo included reciprocity, Cohn advanced James Stewart for the role of Shep. Bell, Book and Candle is generally recognized as Stewart's final romantic leading role.

Early in 1957, producers also launched a somewhat promotional search for Siamese cats to play Pyewacket. According to one release, as many as 12 cats were needed to perform the number of stunts in the film. The primary cat used for the role in close-ups was owned by animal trainer Frank Inn, who reportedly gave the cat to Novak when he saw she'd formed a close bond with him. Pyewacket's name was derived from testimony given in a 17th-century witch trial in England, and referred to a witch's familiar.

Production began on February 3, 1958, and was completed on April 7.

=== Music ===
The film was scored by George Duning, another Columbia veteran who earned praise for his work on From Here to Eternity. The main theme melds bongos and violins, evoking elements of the plot; heard during the opening credits, a few bars of "Jingle Bells" are incorporated to set the Christmas tone of the initial action. Each witch, including Pyewacket the cat, is identified by a musical signature. Duning used creative means such as recording sounds and replaying them at high speed to achieve an eerie background effect for the score.

The soundtrack was released in January 1959 by Colpix (CT-506). (Note: Re-issued by Citadel Records in 1976 (CT-6006) and 1978 (CT-7006).) Most of the recording took place in Munich with Duning conducting the Graunke Symphony Orchestra. The segments featuring the Brothers Candoli, who appear in the film playing at the Zodiac Club, were recorded in Hollywood at Columbia; on these tracks, John Williams can be heard on piano.

Philippe Clay makes a cameo appearance in the film performing "Le Noyé Assassiné" at the Zodiac Club, but this performance is not included on the soundtrack album. However, Harkit Records in England (harkitrecords.com) have reissued the soundtrack album as HRKCD 8099 which does include the Philippe Clay track.

== Home media ==
The film was released on DVD on March 28, 2000. The DVD includes vintage advertising, talent files and the original theatrical trailer. It also includes audio and subtitle tracks for English and Spanish, bonus trailers, the open matte full-frame and anamorphic widescreen (102 min.) theatrical cut. It was released on blu-ray for the first time as a limited edition of 3000 copies by Twilight Time with an audio track featuring an isolated score on April 10, 2012. Bonus features include the trailer in HD as well as two SD retrospectives by Kim Novak. It was released again on blu-ray by Sony on January 28, 2020, without the isolated score audio track from the previous release. It does carry over the other features from the previous release while also adding another retrospective from Novak, all presented in HD.

== Release and reception ==
Bell, Book and Candle was considered a "blockbuster" by Columbia and prior to its release it was promoted accordingly. Novak appeared with Pyewacket on the November 24 cover of Life, along with a write-up that highlighted a tie-in with Life photographer Eliot Elisofon who was the color consultant on the film. There were favorable write-ups in other major magazines and a production number on The Steve Allen Show featured the theme music. (Note: The number was a dance by Augie and Margo. Steve Allen also wrote lyrics for the theme.)

On November 11, 1958, the film made its world premiere in Los Angeles at the Warner Beverly Theatre. It played an exclusive engagement there until its New York premiere on December 25.

Bosley Crowther of The New York Times found the premise "silly and banal" and the screenplay lacking in "any consistent witchery or bounce," but he praised the movie's camera work, set design, and use of color as "sleek and pictorially entrancing."

=== Awards ===
Bell, Book and Candle received Academy Award nominations in two categories: Best Art Direction (Cary Odell and Louis Diage); and Best Costume Design (Jean Louis). It also received a Golden Globes nomination for Best Motion Picture – Comedy.

== Legacy and attempted adaptations ==
Bewitched creator Sol Saks admitted that he drew on Bell as well as the earlier witch-themed I Married a Witch (1942). Screenwriter Paul Wayne said: "He was pretty honest about the fact it wasn't a particularly original idea."

In 1976, Bell, Book and Candle was pitched as a television sitcom fantasy series. A 30-minute pilot episode, starring Yvette Mimieux and Michael Murphy, aired on NBC on September 8, 1976. The supporting cast included: Doris Roberts (Aunt Enid), John Pleshette (Nicky Holroyd), Bridget Hanley (Lois), Susan Sullivan (Rosemary), Edward Andrews (Bishop Fairbarn), and Dori Whitaker (Melissa). The pilot was directed by Hy Averback and written by Richard DeRoy. Bruce Lansbury was the executive producer. The show was not picked up.

In 2006, The Walt Disney Company planned a remake of the film, with Alicia Keys scheduled to play Gillian Holroyd. The deal was organized by Disney studio executives Dick Cook and Nina Jacobson. Keys was going to produce it with her manager Jeff Robinson as the first project for their company Big Pita, Little Pita; Keys would have also been the musical supervisor and organized the soundtrack. Robinson had chosen Keys for the remake after watching the original film; she agreed to the project to avoid "from falling into predictable roles". She explained: "I never wanted to play myself, not in the first role or even the second. I want to do the unexpected." Keys said that the remake would be more "contemporary" and "really delve into the characters more". According to Kurt Loder of Rotten Tomatoes, the remake was never made and Keys dropped out of the role.

== See also ==
- 1958 in film
- List of American films of 1958
- List of Christmas films
- List of Columbia Pictures films
- List of fantasy films of the 1950s
- List of films about witchcraft
- List of films based on stage plays or musicals
- List of films set in New York City
- List of romantic comedy films
