= Storm Center =

1956 film by Daniel Taradash

- British theatrical release poster by Saul Bass
- Directed by: Daniel Taradash
- Screenplay by: Daniel Taradash; Elick Moll
- Story by: Daniel Taradash; Elick Moll
- Produced by: Julian Blaustein
- Starring: Bette Davis; Brian Keith; Kim Hunter
- Cinematography: Burnett Guffey
- Edited by: William A. Lyon
- Music by: George Duning
- Production company: Phoenix Productions
- Distributed by: Columbia Pictures
- Release dates: May 24, 1956 (London); September 26, 1956 (Los Angeles); October 21, 1956 (New York)
- Running time: 86 minutes
- Country: United States
- Language: English
- Budget: $750,000

Storm Center is a 1956 American dramatic film starring Bette Davis and directed by Daniel Taradash. The screenplay by Taradash and Elick Moll focuses on the controversial subjects of communism and censorship.

== Plot ==
Alicia Hull is a widowed small-town librarian dedicated to introducing children to the joy of reading. In exchange for fulfilling her request for a children's wing, the city council asks her to withdraw the book The Communist Dream from the library's collection. When she refuses to comply with their demand, she is fired and branded as a subversive. Freddie Slater, a boy with a deep love of books whom Alicia has closely mentored, is especially upset about her dismissal.

Judge Robert Ellerbe feels that Alicia has been treated unfairly and calls a town meeting, hoping to rally support for her. However, ambitious attorney and aspiring politician Paul Duncan, who is dating assistant librarian Martha Lockridge, reveals Alicia's past associations with organizations that were discovered to be communist fronts. Alicia claims that she resigned from the groups as soon as she learned of their true nature, but because of Duncan's incendiary revelations, only a few people attend the meeting. Those who do attend express concern about being branded communists themselves if they stand with Alicia. Upon hearing their concerns, Alicia informs the meeting that she no longer wishes to fight the city council and wants to drop the matter. With no opposition to her removal mounted, most of the town eventually turns against Alicia.

Freddie, convinced by the opinions of others, particularly his narrow-minded father, that Alicia is a bad person, becomes fearful of books themselves. In his rage and frustration, he sets fire to the library. His actions cause the residents to have a change of heart, and they ask Alicia to return and supervise the construction of a new building. Alicia agrees, lamenting her earlier decision not to fight and vowing never again to allow a book to be removed from the library.

== Cast ==
- Bette Davis as Alicia Hull
- Brian Keith as Paul Duncan
- Kim Hunter as Martha Lockridge
- Paul Kelly as Judge Robert Ellerbe
- Joe Mantell as George Slater
- Kevin Coughlin as Freddie Slater
- Sally Brophy as Laura Slater (as Sallie Brophie)
- Howard Wierum as Mayor Levering
- Curtis Cooksey as Stacey Martin
- Michael Raffetto as Edgar Greenbaum
- Joseph Kearns as Mr. Morrisey
- Edward Platt as Rev. Wilson
- Kathryn Grant as Hazel Levering
- Howard Wendell as Sen. Bascomb

== Production ==
In 1951, it was announced that Mary Pickford would return to the screen after an 18-year absence in The Library, produced by Stanley Kramer and directed by Irving Reis. The following year, she withdrew from the project, a month before filming was scheduled to begin, reportedly because it was not a Technicolor production. Within days, Kramer signed Barbara Stanwyck to replace her, but Stanwyck's scheduling conflicts repeatedly delayed the start of filming. Kramer eventually withdrew from the project, and it remained in limbo until Taradash decided to direct it himself with the new title of Storm Center. It is the only film that Taradash directed.

While the events in the film are largely fictional, the character of Alicia is based on Ruth W. Brown, a Bartlesville, Oklahoma librarian who struggled with the county commission over communist literature.

Although set in New England, the film was shot on location in Santa Rosa, California.

The film features an early poster and title sequence created by noted graphic designer Saul Bass. The opening title sequence features flames that eat away at both the face of a boy and pages from a book. The two pages shown are actually duplicates of a single page from Chapter 2 of John Stuart Mill's 1859 essay "On Liberty".

== Release ==
The film's world premiere was held at the Odeon Theatre in London's Leicester Square on May 24, 1956, several months before it would premiere in the United States. Based on the film's positive reception from British officials and film critics, the U.S. Department of State requested that Taradash and producer Julian Blaustein produce a television version of Storm Center for broadcast into countries behind the Iron Curtain.

Bette Davis was reported to be so pleased with the film that she volunteered to embark on a 20-city promotional tour, something that she had never done for any of her films. However, she later said: "I was not overjoyed with the finished film ... I had far higher hopes for it. The basic lack was the casting of the boy. He was not a warm, loving type of child ... His relationship with the librarian was totally unemotional, and, therefore, robbed the film of its most important factor, [because] their relationship ... was the nucleus of the script."

After the American release of Storm Center, the National Legion of Decency created a new classification for films of its type that "while not morally offensive, require some analysis and explanation as a protection to the uninformed against wrong interpretations and false conclusions". The Motion Picture Industry Council objected, stating that the legion had moved from critical review and spiritual guidance to censorship by creating the new category. In response to the legion's assertion that the film "offers a warped, over-simplified emotional solution to the complex problems of civil liberties", Variety wrote: "It's almost impossible to over-dramatize human liberty whether it's a depiction of Patrick Henry ... or a librarian sacrificing her reputation rather than her democratic principles."

== Reception ==
In a contemporary review for The New York Times, critic Bosley Crowther wrote:

No subtle or tenuous circumstances as might be likely in such a situation are touched, and thus the crisis seems less a real-life issue than a hypothetical case put in a tract. This is too bad, because the purpose and courage of the men who made this film not only are to be commended but also deserve concrete rewards. They have opened a subject that is touchy and urgent in contemporary life. It should be presented so adroitly that it would fascinate and move people deeply. Furthermore, they have got from Bette Davis a fearless and forceful performance as the middle-aged widowed librarian who stands by her principles. Miss Davis makes the prim but stalwart lady human and credible. ... However, again the thesis is much better than the putting forth of it. The visualization of this drama is clumsy and abrupt. ... Mr. Blaustein and Mr. Taradash have tried nobly, but they have failed to develop a film that whips up dramatic excitement or flames with passion in support of its theme.

In a later reflection on the topical nature of recent films, Crowther added:

Unfortunately, for all the courage that producer Julian Blaustein and writer-director Daniel Taradash have shown in tackling these serious questions, they have not presented them in such a way that the issues seem wholly realistic or are probed with complete clarity. The case has the curious appearance of a streamlined mechanized plot and the people seem strangely artificial, save for Bette Davis in the leading role. Miss Davis gives a credible performance as the librarian who is dumped and then harassed, but the rest of the people in the picture act like scoundrels in an old-fashioned play. Even so, and for all its shortcomings, "Storm Center" brings up some ideas that should receive wide circulation. These are such ideas as the effect of fear-mongering on our children and it is good to see them being brought up on the screen.

Philip K. Scheuer of the Los Angeles Times wrote: "The issue in this courageous 'little' film, which takes the liberal viewpoint, is academic freedom. But the problem is first and foremost an intellectual one, and all the efforts of the writer (with Elick Moll) and director, Daniel Taradash, to express it In terms of emotional melodrama fail to lift it out of the sphere of talked ideas for long. ... [I]f 'Storm Center' is ultimately unconvincing as realism it does leave the spectator with new awareness and even a sense of social responsibility in the issue at stake. Its message gets across—and this, I am sure, is what matters most to Taradash and his producer, Julian Blaustein."

In the Saturday Review, Arthur Knight wrote that the film "comes to grips with its central problem with a forthright honesty and integrity...It may be that in fashioning the story, the authors have made their film a bit too pat, a bit too glib, a bit too easy in its articulation of the various points of view expressed. Bette Davis's enlightened liberalism sounds at times as dangerously smug and self-righteous as the benighted politicos and anti-intellectuals who oppose her."

== Awards ==
In 1957, Storm Center was awarded the Prix de Chevalier da la Barre at the Cannes Film Festival, where it was cited as "this year's film which best helps freedom of expression and tolerance".

== Home media ==
Storm Center was released in DVD format on March 4, 2011 and in Blu-ray format by Imprint Films on September 9, 2022.

== See also ==
- List of American films of 1956
- Hollywood on Trial - 1976 Oscar-nominated documentary featured on the Blu-ray edition
- Bibliophobia
