= Julian Blaustein =

American film producer (1913–1995)

- Born: May 30, 1913; New York City, New York, U.S.
- Died: June 20, 1995 (aged 82); Beverly Hills, California, U.S.
- Occupation: Film producer

Julian Blaustein (May 30, 1913 – June 20, 1995) was an American film producer.

== Life and career ==
Born in New York City, Blaustein attended Boston Latin School and graduated from Harvard University in 1933. He spent a year in flight training at the Randolph Air Force Base before heading to Hollywood, where he became a reader in the story department at Universal Pictures. He eventually was promoted to department head. He left Universal to work in a similar position at Paramount Pictures.

During World War II, Blaustein produced training films for the United States Army Signal Corps in Astoria, New York. Following the war, he returned to Los Angeles and joined David O. Selznick Productions. Two years later, he joined 20th Century Fox, but in 1955 he left the studio to become an independent producer under the Phoenix name.

After retiring from the film industry, Blaustein became an Adjunct Professor of Communication at Stanford University, where he taught documentary writing and directing and supervised a Master's program in screenwriting. Following his retirement from teaching, he returned to Beverly Hills, where he became an active member of the Academy of Motion Picture Arts and Sciences and a trustee of the Motion Picture and Television Fund.

== Personal life ==
Blaustein married Florence Blaustein. He had a son, John, and a daughter, Laurie.

=== Death ===
Blaustein died of cancer in his home in Beverly Hills.

== Filmography ==
=== As producer ===
Year	Title	Director
1950	Broken Arrow	Delmer Daves
1950	Mister 880	Edmund Goulding
1951	Half Angel	Richard Sale
1951	Take Care of My Little Girl	Jean Negulesco
1951	The Guy Who Came Back	Joseph M. Newman
1951	The Day the Earth Stood Still	Robert Wise
1952	The Outcasts of Poker Flat	Joseph M. Newman
1952	Don't Bother to Knock	Roy Ward Baker
1954	Désirée	Henry Koster
1954	The Racers	Henry Hathaway
1956	Storm Center	Daniel Taradash
1958	Cowboy	Delmer Daves
1958	Bell, Book and Candle	Richard Quine
1961	Two Loves	Charles Walters
1962	The Four Horsemen of the Apocalypse	Vincente Minnelli
1966	Khartoum	Basil Dearden
1969	3 into 2 Won't Go	Peter Hall

=== As executive producer ===
- The Wreck of the Mary Deare (1959)
- The Beguiled (1971)

=== As story writer ===
- For Love or Money (1939)
- The Noose Hangs High (1948)
