= Désirée (film) =

1954 film by Henry Koster

- Theatrical release poster
- Directed by: Henry Koster
- Written by: Daniel Taradash
- Based on: Désirée; 1951 novel by Annemarie Selinko
- Produced by: Julian Blaustein
- Starring: Marlon Brando; Jean Simmons; Merle Oberon; Michael Rennie; Cameron Mitchell
- Cinematography: Milton R. Krasner
- Edited by: William H. Reynolds
- Music by: Alex North
- Production company: 20th Century Fox
- Distributed by: 20th Century Fox
- Release date: November 16, 1954 (San Francisco)
- Running time: 110 minutes
- Country: United States
- Languages: English; Swedish
- Budget: $2,720,000
- Box office: $9,000,000

Désirée is a 1954 American historical romance film directed by Henry Koster and produced by Julian Blaustein from a screenplay by Daniel Taradash, based on the best-selling novel Désirée by Annemarie Selinko. The music score was by Alex North and the cinematography by Milton R. Krasner. The film was made in CinemaScope.

It stars Marlon Brando as Napoleon Bonaparte and Jean Simmons as Désirée Clary. It also stars Merle Oberon and Michael Rennie with Cameron Mitchell, Elizabeth Sellars, Charlotte Austin, Cathleen Nesbitt, Carolyn Jones and Evelyn Varden.

The film was nominated for two Academy Awards, for Best Art Direction (color) (Lyle R. Wheeler, Leland Fuller, Walter M. Scott, Paul S. Fox) and Best Costume Design (René Hubert and Charles LeMaire).

== Plot ==
In 1794 Marseille, Désirée Clary makes the acquaintance of Corsican Joseph Bonaparte and invites him and his brother, Captain Napoleon Bonaparte, to call upon her family the following day. The next day, Julie, Désirée's sister, and Joseph are immediately attracted to each other, and Napoleon is taken with Désirée. Napoleon admits to Desirée that the impoverished Bonaparte brothers need the rich dowries of the Clary sisters. Later, she learns that Napoleon has been arrested and taken to Paris.

Eventually returning to Marseille, Napoleon tells Désirée that he has been cleared of all charges and has been ordered to track down Bourbon royalists in Paris. Désirée begs Napoleon to leave the Army and join her brother in business, but he scoffs at the idea and instead proposes marriage. She accepts and lends him the money to return to Paris.

Napoleon assures her that he will always love her and will return soon for their wedding, but as the months pass, Désirée starts doubting him and goes to Paris, where she meets General Jean-Baptiste Bernadotte without disclosing she is Napoleon's fiancée. She learns that Napoleon is engaged to the wealthy Joséphine de Beauharnais. Devastated, Désirée contemplates jumping off a bridge, but Bernadotte follows and consoles her, still unaware of her identity.

In 1797, Napoleon, now France's leading general, has succeeded in conquering Italy, and Désirée lives in Rome with married Julie and Joseph. Soon tiring of Rome, she decides to return to Paris, where she meets Napoleon, now married to Josephine, who announces that he will be leaving for a new campaign in Egypt. Bernadotte is thrilled to meet Désirée formally and soon proposes marriage to her.

By July 4, 1799, Désirée and Bernadotte are happily settled into married life and have a son, Oscar. On November 9, 1799, Napoleon is proclaimed First Consul of the French Republic and asks Bernadotte to join his council of state; Bernadotte agrees.

Several years later, Napoleon is proclaimed emperor, and at his coronation, he takes the crown from the hands of Pope Pius VII and crowns himself.

Five years later, desperate for an heir, Napoleon divorces Josephine. Désirée comforts her former rival before Napoleon's upcoming marriage to the 18-year-old Marie Louise of Austria. Napoleon involves France in more wars, and Bernadotte is approached by representatives of King Charles XIII of Sweden, who wishes to adopt him and make him the heir to the throne. Stunned by the news that she will one day be a queen, Désirée nevertheless supports her husband, and eventually Napoleon allows them both to leave Paris.

In Stockholm, failing to fit in with the royal family, Désirée soon asks to go home. Eight months later, she attends a ball in Paris at which Napoleon shows off his new son, Napoleon II. Napoleon makes veiled threats about Bernadotte's alliance with Russia and announces to the crowd that Désirée will be held hostage to ensure Sweden's support while his army invades Russia and captures Moscow.

When Napoleon's army is defeated, he visits Désirée, asking her to write a letter to Bernadotte requesting his help. Désirée realizes that Napoleon still loves her and came more for her consolation than to seek her husband's help. Soon after, during the War of the Sixth Coalition, Bernadotte leads one of the armies that overwhelms Napoleon, and the triumphant general reunites with Désirée before returning to Sweden.

Exile to Elba is short-lived, however, and after the Battle of Waterloo, Napoleon retreats with his personal army to the Château de Malmaison. Representatives of the allied armies ask Désirée to speak with Napoleon, hoping that she can persuade him to surrender. Napoleon agrees to speak with Désirée alone, musing on what his destiny would have been if he had married her. He proclaims that he has given his life to protect France, but Désirée gently tells him that he must do as France asks and go into exile on St. Helena. Commenting on how strange it is that the two most outstanding men of their time had fallen in love with her, Napoleon gives Désirée his sword in surrender and assures her that her dowry was not the only reason he proposed to her many years before in Marseille.

== Cast ==
- Marlon Brando as Napoleon Bonaparte
- Jean Simmons as Désirée Clary
- Merle Oberon as Joséphine de Beauharnais
- Michael Rennie as Jean-Baptiste Bernadotte
- Cameron Mitchell as Joseph Bonaparte
- Elizabeth Sellars as Julie Clary
- Charlotte Austin as Paulette
- Cathleen Nesbitt as Mme. Bonaparte
- Evelyn Varden as Marie
- Isobel Elsom as Madame Clary
- John Hoyt as Talleyrand
- Alan Napier as Despereaux

Uncredited

- Nicholas Koster as Oscar
- Richard Deacon as Etienne
- Edith Evanson as Queen Hedwig
- Carolyn Jones as Mme. Tallien
- Sam Gilman as Fouché
- Larry Craine as Louis Bonaparte
- Judy Lester as Caroline Bonaparte
- Louis Borel as Baron Morner
- Peter Bourne as Count Brahe
- Dorothy Neumann as Queen Sofia
- Violet Rensing as Marie Louise of Austria
- Leonard George as Pope Pius VII

== Reception ==
The film received mixed reviews from critics. Bosley Crowther of The New York Times wrote: "A great deal of handsome decoration and two talented and attractive stars have been put into the CinemaScope production of the historical romance 'Desiree.' The only essential missing is a story of any consequence ... Mr. Taradash's script is quite positive in indicating that Napoleon loved the girl in the first flush of his ascendancy. But then it permits the amorous passion to appear to die, and there is not much in this line to intrigue the viewer until the end of the film."

Variety called the film "easily one of the best and most potent costumers to come along in the widescreen age," and called Brando's performance "a masterful exhibition of thesping." Harrison's Reports called it "an engrossing entertainment, with exceptionally fine performances." Richard L. Coe of The Washington Post called the film "a feast to the eyes and a torture to the ears, intelligence and sensibilities," and called Brando's performance "better than 'Desiree' deserves."

John McCarten of The New Yorker wrote, "There's a lot of colorful stuff on view—palace fêtes, lovely gardens and so on—but the plot is practically invisible." The Monthly Film Bulletin wrote: "As Napoleon, Marlon Brando is given little opportunity to do more than wear the uniforms and strike the familiar attitudes ... although the performance is tentative and uneasy, he carries off some scenes with authority, a suggestion of muffled power, that perhaps indicates what he might have been able to make of the character in a film more ambitiously and imaginatively conceived."

== Notes ==
The story of Désirée was the subject of an earlier film, Le Destin fabuleux de Désirée Clary, made in 1942 by Sacha Guitry.
