= For Love or Money (1939 film) =

- Theatrical release poster
- Directed by: Albert S. Rogell
- Screenplay by: Charles Grayson; Arthur T. Horman
- Story by: Julian Blaustein; Daniel Taradash; Bernard Feins
- Produced by: Max Golden
- Starring: June Lang; Robert Kent; Edward Brophy; Etienne Girardot; Richard Lane; Addison Richards; Edward Gargan; Horace McMahon
- Cinematography: Stanley Cortez
- Edited by: Maurice Wright
- Production company: Universal Pictures
- Distributed by: Universal Pictures
- Release date: April 28, 1939
- Running time: 67 minutes
- Country: United States
- Language: English

For Love or Money is a 1939 American comedy film directed by Albert S. Rogell and written by Charles Grayson and Arthur T. Horman. The film stars June Lang, Robert Kent, Edward Brophy, Etienne Girardot, Richard Lane, Addison Richards, Edward Gargan and Horace McMahon. The film was released on April 28, 1939, by Universal Pictures.

== Cast ==
- June Lang as Susan Bannister
- Robert Kent as Ted Frazier
- Edward Brophy as Sleeper
- Etienne Girardot as J. C. Poindexter
- Richard Lane as Foster
- Addison Richards as Kelly
- Edward Gargan as Bubbles
- Horace McMahon as Dead Eyes
- Cora Witherspoon as Mrs. Sweringen
- Dora Clement as Miss Upton
- Mary Treen as Amy
- Raymond Parker as Delivery Boy
- Jerry Marlowe as Delivery Boy
- Armand Kaliz as Nanda
- Alan Edwards as Manager
- Hal K. Dawson as Cashier
- Eddy Chandler as John
- Neely Edwards as Travel Bureau Clerk
- Alphonse Martell as Head Waiter
- Walter Merrill as Luke
- Russ Powell as Night Watchman
- Francis Sayles as Bartender
- Jack Gardner as Elevator Boy
- Charles Regan as Peter
- Walter Clinton as Postman
- Robin Raymond as Maid
