= Nervous Man in a Four Dollar Room =

- The Twilight Zone episode
- Episode no.: Season 2 Episode 3
- Directed by: Douglas Heyes
- Written by: Rod Serling
- Production code: 173-3641
- Original air date: October 14, 1960

Guest appearances
- Joe Mantell as John "Jackie" Rhoades; William D. Gordon as George

Episode chronology
← Previous "The Man in the Bottle"	Next → "A Thing About Machines"
- The Twilight Zone (1959 TV series, season 2)

"Nervous Man in a Four Dollar Room" is episode 39 of the American television anthology series The Twilight Zone. It originally aired on October 14, 1960, on CBS.

According to the book The Twilight Zone: Unlocking the Door to a Television Classic by Martin Grams, Serling wrote the teleplay in response to a request from CBS to write scripts using as few actors as possible for budgetary purposes. This episode was produced $5,000 under budget.

== Opening narration ==
This is Mr. Jackie Rhoades, age thirty-four, and where some men leave a mark of their lives as a record of their fragmentary existence on Earth, this man leaves a blot, a dirty, discolored blemish to document a cheap and undistinguished sojourn amongst his betters. What you're about to watch in this room is a strange mortal combat between a man and himself, for in just a moment, Mr. Jackie Rhoades, whose life has been given over to fighting adversaries, will find his most formidable opponent in a cheap hotel room that is in reality the outskirts of The Twilight Zone.

== Plot ==
An insecure, unsuccessful gangster named Jackie Rhoades waits in a cheap hotel room for instructions from his boss, George. George gives Jackie a gun and orders him to shoot a barkeeper who has refused to pay for protection. Jackie begs to be given another job, but George flatly refuses, roughs Jackie up, and leaves. Terrified, Jackie starts talking to his reflection in the mirror, trying to justify committing murder. He puts a cigarette to his lips but finds no match.

A puff of smoke emerges from the other side of the mirror, and he sees reflected a different version of himself: a strong, self-assured, confident man. Jackie and his reflection engage in a lengthy argument about how his life has turned out as a result of going along with peers and never standing up for himself. Finally, the double tells Jackie he wants to take over, that it is his turn to run their life, and that he deserves to live. Jackie argues but cannot decide what to do.

George telephones and Jackie nervously assures him that he is on the way to do the job. The double reappears and tries to persuade Jackie to let him out. He knows that disaster will strike, life will be over, if Jackie tries to do the job; he refuses to let Jackie lead them both to ruin. Angry and panicking, Jackie spins the mirror on the chest of drawers and, as it spins, Jackie backs away in terror when he sees that the double is looming larger and larger.

George comes by, furious that Jackie has not done his job, and demands to know: "So what've you got to say for yourself?" Jackie calmly looks up at him and answers, "Two words. I resign!" emphasizing the point by kicking and punching George. Jackie opens the door and orders a bewildered George out, tossing the gun after him and telling him to never come back. Ringing the room clerk to check out, Jackie refers to himself as "Jackie- John Rhoades." The nervous Jackie, now on the other side of the mirror, asks, "What's to do now?" John responds, "Now we go look for a job. Now maybe we get married. Now maybe we stop biting our nails." John then walks out of the room, looks back at the mirror, and sees only his own confident reflection.

== Closing narration ==
Exit Mr. John Rhoades, formerly a reflection in a mirror, a fragment of someone else's conscience, a wishful thinker made out of glass, but now made out of flesh, and on his way to join the company of men. Mr. John Rhoades, with one foot through the door and one foot out of the Twilight Zone.

== See also ==
- List of The Twilight Zone (1959 TV series) episodes
