= Daniel Taradash =

American screenwriter

- Born: January 29, 1913; Louisville, Kentucky, U.S.
- Died: February 22, 2003 (aged 90); Los Angeles, California, U.S.
- Education: Harvard Law School
- Years active: 1939–1980
- Spouse: Madeleine Forbes (1945–2003)

President of the Academy of Motion Picture Arts and Sciences
- In office 1970–1973
- Preceded by: Gregory Peck
- Succeeded by: Walter Mirisch

President of the Writers Guild of America West
- In office 1977–1979
- Preceded by: David W. Rintels
- Succeeded by: Ernest Lehman

Daniel Taradash (January 29, 1913 – February 22, 2003) was an American screenwriter and playwright. He won an Academy Award for Best Adapted Screenplay for the 1953 film From Here to Eternity. He also served as the President of the Academy of Motion Picture Arts and Sciences from 1970 to 1973, and as President of the Writers Guild of America West from 1977 to 1979.

== Life and career ==
=== Early years ===
Daniel Taradash was born to a Jewish family in Kentucky and raised in Chicago and Miami Beach. He attended Harvard University, where he met his future producing partner Jules Blaustein. He graduated with a law degree and passed the New York State bar. But when his play The Mercy won the 1938 Bureau of New Plays contest (the two previous winners were Arthur Miller and Tennessee Williams), a career in theater was launched. He moved to Hollywood, where he worked as a scripter. His first assignment was as one of four credited writers on the screen version of Clifford Odets' Golden Boy (1939).

=== Military service ===
His theater career was interrupted when, during World War II, Taradash served in the U.S. Army. He eventually underwent training in the Signal Corps Officer Candidate program. He was assigned to the Signal Corps Photo Center, where he worked as a writer and producer on training films.

=== Post World War II ===
After the war in 1948, Taradash attempted to find success on Broadway with an American version of Jean-Paul Sartre's Red Gloves, but the show folded quickly and he returned to Hollywood. He had more success as the co-writer (with John Monks Jr) of the Humphrey Bogart vehicle Knock on Any Door (1949). The Fritz Lang Western Rancho Notorious and the psychodrama Don't Bother to Knock (both 1952). Performers included Marlene Dietrich and Arthur Kennedy in the former, Richard Widmark and Marilyn Monroe in the latter. His adaptation of James Jones' novel From Here to Eternity (1953) starring Burt Lancaster was a big success and earned Taradash an Oscar. It was directed by Fred Zinnemann.

His subsequent film work was generally in adaptations, including Desiree (1954), about Napoleon and Joséphine; Picnic (1955), from the William Inge play; and Bell, Book and Candle (1958), from John Van Druten's stage comedy.

In the mid-1950s, Taradash and Jules Blaustein formed Phoenix Corporation. He also tried his hand at directing with Storm Center (1956), starring Bette Davis as a librarian fighting censorship and book banning. Taradash and Zinnemann had planned to make two films from James Michener's massive novel Hawaii but were unable to raise the financing. When George Roy Hill did make the film in 1965, he utilized Taradash's script with emendations by Dalton Trumbo.

In 1960, Taradash wrote the play There Was a Little Girl. The play premiered at the Cort Theatre on February 29, 1960, directed by Joshua Logan and starring Jane Fonda.

By the 1970s, Taradash's efforts produced his final two scripts for the dramas Doctors' Wives (1971) and The Other Side of Midnight (1977).

Taradash won the Oscar for Best Adapted Screenplay and the Writers Guild of America Award for Best Written American Drama for From Here to Eternity, and he received a WGA nomination for Picnic.

=== Other activities ===
Taradash served as president of the Academy of Motion Picture Arts and Sciences (AMPAS) from 1970 to 1973. He was AMPAS's 20th president. In 1972, he introduced Charlie Chaplin at Chaplin's appearance at the 44th Academy Awards and presented him with an honorary award.

From 1977 to 1979, Taradash was the President of the Writers Guild of America West.

== Death ==
Taradash died of pancreatic cancer in Los Angeles on February 22, 2003, at age 90.

== Filmography ==
=== Film ===
Year	Title	Director	Notes
1939	For Love or Money	Albert S. Rogell	Co-wrote story with Julian Blaustein and Bernard Feins
1939	Golden Boy	Rouben Mamoulian	Co-writer with Lewis Meltzer, Sarah Y. Mason and Victor Heerman
1940	A Little Bit of Heaven	Andrew Marton	Co-writer with Gertrude Purcell
1948	The Noose Hangs High	Charles Barton	Co-wrote story with Julian Blaustein and Bernard Feins
1949	Knock on Any Door	Nicholas Ray	Co-writer with John Monks Jr.
1952	Rancho Notorious	Fritz Lang	
1952	Don't Bother to Knock	Roy Ward Baker	
1953	From Here to Eternity	Fred Zinnemann	
1954	Désirée	Henry Koster	
1955	Picnic	Joshua Logan	
1956	Storm Center	Himself	Also director; co-writer with Elick Moll
1958	Bell, Book and Candle	Richard Quine	
1965	Morituri	Bernhard Wicki	
1966	Alvarez Kelly	Edward Dmytryk	Uncredited
1966	Hawaii	George Roy Hill	Co-writer with Dalton Trumbo
1969	Castle Keep	Sydney Pollack	Co-writer with David Rayfiel
1971	Doctors' Wives	George Schaefer	
1977	The Other Side of Midnight	Charles Jarrott	Co-writer with Herman Raucher

=== Television ===
Year	Title	Notes
1980	Bogie	TV movie

Non-profit organization positions
Preceded by Gregory Peck	President of Academy of Motion Pictures, Arts and Sciences; 1970–1973	Succeeded by Walter Mirisch
