= Teddy Infuhr =

American actor (1936–2007)

Teddy Infuhr (November 9, 1936 – May 12, 2007), born Theodore Edward Infuhr, was an American child actor.

== Biography ==
Missouri-born child actor Teddy Infuhr, youngest of four, moved with his family to Los Angeles when he was three and was initially prodded into acting by his mother. A young student at the Rainbow Studios, he was spotted by a talent agent and booked the very first film he went out on with The Tuttles of Tahiti (1942) at the age of five. Throughout the rest of the 1940s he would find steady roles as mean-spirited tykes, trouble-makers or bullying types, never settling down to one specific studio.

A good portion of his work was noticeable yet he also appeared unbilled much of the time. Unable to move into the major child star leagues, he was cast in some of the biggest pictures Hollywood had to offer including A Tree Grows in Brooklyn, Spellbound and The Best Years of Our Lives. In the latter, Infuhr played a drugstore brat chided by Dana Andrews' character, Fred Derry. One of his more oddball roles included the role of Gale Sondergaard's fly-catching nephew in The Spider Woman.

Ted found a recurring role in the "Rusty" canine adventure series, beginning with The Return of Rusty and finishing with Rusty's Birthday. He was also one of the bucolic brood in the Ma and Pa Kettle series that was introduced with the classic The Egg and I. He appeared more times in that series than any other of the regular child stars. After the war, he had larger parts in The Boy with Green Hair, Fighting Fools, West of El Dorado and Blondie's Hero and appeared with Gene Autry a few times.

== Personal life ==
Teddy was one of the few child actors that Natalie Wood's mother allowed her to socialize with on the set.

For his role in The North Star, Teddy had to shave his head bald. The embarrassed 7-year-old returned to school wearing a hat and refused to remove it to the dismay of his teachers until they found out the reason.

Unfortunately, he did not survive the transition from awkward adolescent to adult, ending his career unbilled as a troubled teen in Blackboard Jungle. Luckily, Teddy played it smart, and found a vocation, graduating from chiropractic school in 1958. Long married to wife Rita, with whom he had two sons, he had no qualms or regrets about leaving show business. Until his death in Thousand Oaks on May 12, 2007, he attended nostalgia conventions.

== Selected filmography ==
- The Tuttles of Tahiti (1942) — Ala
- Pardon My Sarong (1942) — Nemo (uncredited)
- The Amazing Mrs. Holliday (1943) — Orphan (Teddy)
- Hers to Hold (1943) — Joey (uncredited)
- The Iron Major (1943) — Davie as Boy (uncredited)
- Gildersleeve on Broadway (1943) — Stanley (uncredited)
- The North Star (1943) — Bald Schoolboy (uncredited)
- The Spider Woman (1943) — Larry (uncredited)
- She's for Me (1943) — Child
- Madame Curie (1943) — Son (uncredited)
- Youth Runs Wild (1944) — Max (uncredited)
- San Diego, I Love You (1944) — Brat (uncredited)
- Heavenly Days (1944) — Czech Boy (uncredited)
- The Unwritten Code (1944) — Dutchy Schultz
- Bowery to Broadway (1944) — Small Boy (uncredited)
- A Tree Grows in Brooklyn (1945) — Boy in Soda Fountain (uncredited)
- The Clock (1945) — Boy in Park with Sailboat (uncredited)
- That's the Spirit (1945) — Pageboy (uncredited)
- Dangerous Partners (1945) — Boy in Budlow's Waiting Room (uncredited)
- Mama Loves Papa (1945) — Boy (uncredited)
- That Night with You (1945) — Bingo
- Spellbound (1945) — John Ballantine's Brother (uncredited)
- Because of Him (1946) — Boy (uncredited)
- Gay Blades (1946) — Small Boy (uncredited)
- Roaring Rangers (1946) — Boy with Money (uncredited)
- Sentimental Journey (1946) — Boy on Bus (uncredited)
- Song of Arizona (1946) — Half-a-Chance Ranch Boy (uncredited)
- The Virginian (1946) — Christopher (uncredited)
- The Return of Rusty (1946) — Herbie
- Till the End of Time (1946) — Freddy Stewart (uncredited)
- Faithful in My Fashion (1946) — Newsboy (scenes deleted)
- Little Miss Big (1946) — Boy (uncredited)
- Three Wise Fools (1946) — Johnny, the Grunt (uncredited)
- Sister Kenny (1946) — Boy (scenes deleted)
- The Strange Woman (1946) — Boy on Bridge (uncredited)
- Affairs of Geraldine (1946) — Small Boy (uncredited)
- The Best Years of Our Lives (1946) — Dexter — Brat in Drugstore (uncredited)
- My Brother Talks to Horses (1947) — Boy at School (uncredited)
- The Egg and I (1947) — Albert Kettle (uncredited)
- For the Love of Rusty (1947) — Tommy Worden (uncredited)
- Desperate (1947) — Richard (uncredited)
- The Son of Rusty (1947) — Squeaky Foley (uncredited)
- Driftwood (1947) — Lester Snyder
- Her Husband's Affairs (1947) — Boy (uncredited)
- The Bishop's Wife (1947) — Attack Captain
- Campus Honeymoon (1948) — Junior Ormsbee
- Phantom Valley (1948) — Smart Kid (uncredited)
- The Bride Goes Wild (1948) — Scout (uncredited)
- My Dog Rusty (1948) — Squeaky Foley (uncredited)
- They Live by Night (1948) — Alvin
- Rusty Leads the Way (1948) — Squeaky (uncredited)
- The Return of October (1948) — Racetrack Brat (uncredited)
- The Boy with Green Hair (1948) — Timmy
- The Sun Comes Up (1949) — Junebug an Orphan (uncredited)
- Fighting Fools (1949) — Boomer Higgins
- Ma and Pa Kettle (1949) — Benjamin Kettle (uncredited)
- Adventure in Baltimore (1949) — Boy (uncredited)
- West of El Dorado (1949) — Larry Dallas
- Mr. Soft Touch (1949) — Jackie — Betting Boy (uncredited)
- Brimstone (1949) — Young Boy (uncredited)
- Madame Bovary (1949) — Nosey Boy at Rouault's Home (uncredited)
- Rusty's Birthday (1949) — Squeaky Foley (uncredited)
- And Baby Makes Three (1949) — Danny Stacy (uncredited)
- The Traveling Saleswoman (1950) — Homer Owen (uncredited)
- Blondie's Hero (1950) — Danny Gateson
- The Good Humor Man (1950) — Kid Football Player (uncredited)
- Ma and Pa Kettle Go to Town (1950) — Benjamin Kettle (uncredited)
- The Underworld Story (1950) — Johnny (uncredited)
- Summer Stock (1950) — A Boy (uncredited)
- The Killer That Stalked New York (1950) — Boy Outside Willie's Place (uncredited)
- California Passage (1950) — Young Mailer Boy (uncredited)
- Grounds for Marriage (1951) — Jimmy (uncredited)
- Gene Autry and the Mounties (1951) — Boy (uncredited)
- Ma and Pa Kettle Back on the Farm (1951) — Benjamin Kettle (uncredited)
- David and Bathsheba (1951) — Jonathan as a Boy (uncredited)
- The Hills of Utah (1951) — Boy Leading Gene into Trap (uncredited)
- The Family Secret (1951) — Marvin (uncredited)
- The Gene Autry Show (1951, TV Series) — Bobby Miller
- Valley of Fire (1951) — Virgil
- Too Young to Kiss (1951) — Jeffrey (uncredited)
- Talk About a Stranger (1952) — Gregory, Boy in San Sala (uncredited)
- Scaramouche (1952) — Boy (uncredited)
- Ma and Pa Kettle at the Fair (1952) — Benjamin Kettle (uncredited)
- The Cisco Kid (1952, TV Series) — Bobby Torrance / Tommy Loring
- The Juggler (1953) — School Boy (uncredited)
- Mister Scoutmaster (1953) — Lew Blodger (uncredited)
- The Abbott and Costello Show (1953, TV Series) — Fresh Kid
- Men of the Fighting Lady (1954) — Andy Szymanski Jr. (uncredited)
- Blackboard Jungle (1955) — Needles — a Teenager (uncredited)

== Bibliography ==
- Goldrup, Tom and Jim (2002). Growing Up on the Set: Interviews with 39 Former Child Actors of Film and Television. McFarland & Co. pp. 138–142. ISBN 1476613702.
- Holmstrom, John (1996). The Moving Picture Boy: An International Encyclopaedia from 1895 to 1995. Norwich: Michael Russell, p. 198-199.
