= The Egg and I (TV series) =

American TV comedy series (1951–1952)

The Egg and I is an American comedy television serial that was broadcast on CBS from September 3, 1951, to August 1, 1952.

== Overview ==
Based on Betty MacDonald's book, The Egg and I, the series focused on MacDonald's adventures with her chicken-farmer husband after they sold their home in Manhattan and moved to upstate New York. John Craven portrayed Bob MacDonald, and Patricia Kirkland initially portrayed Betty MacDonald. Claudette Colbert had been originally planned for that role, which she had played in the film based on the novel. Betty Lynn replaced Kirkland effective March 10, 1952, because of Kirkland's pregnancy. Some of the show's characters were carried over from the book and film, while others were new. Ma and Pa Kettle were the MacDonalds' neighbors, and Jed Simmons was the couple's farmhand. Ed Peabody owned the general store. The Egg and I differed from most serials in that each episode was self-contained; story lines did not continue from one episode to another.

== Cast ==
- Bob MacDonald - Craven
- Betty MacDonald - Kirkland
- Ma Kettle - Doris Rich
- Pa Kettle - Frank Twedell
- Jed Simmons - Grady Sutton
- Lisa Schumacher - Ingeborg Theek
- Paula French - Karen Hale
- Gammy - Mary Perry
- Ed Peabody - William A. Lee
- Announcer - Allyn Edwards.

== Production ==
Montgomery Ford was the producer; Jack Gage and Judson Whiting were the directors. Mel Goldberg, Manya Starr and Robert Soderberg were the writers. The program was broadcast Monday - Friday from noon to 12:15 p.m. Eastern Time, live, with no laugh track. Originating from WCBS-TV, the show initially was sustaining. Later, Colgate was the sponsor on Mondays, Wednesdays, and Fridays, while Procter & Gamble sponsored it on Tuesdays and Thursdays. The production budget was $15,000 per week.

=== Livestock ===
The Egg and I was the only TV show of its time that used barnyard livestock. The foxhound "was picked up at the Bide-A-Wee Home". The cow, rented from a riding academy, was brought to the studio in a van daily along with a stableman and two helpers. Chickens varied from day to day. Each day the studio received 50 chickens delivered from a market. After the episode they were returned to the market, from which they were sold to butcher shops and restaurants.

== Critical response ==
A review in the trade publication Billboard described The Egg and I as "gentle, humorous, and heartwarming". The review commended Starr's writing and noted that the casting had been done "superlatively in all its roles".

Time magazine's brief review said, "Betty MacDonald’s saga of a city couple on a chicken farm is inspirational in tone, concerned with small problems, and played to the hilt by the cast, notably by a breathless actress named Pat Kirkland."

== Pilot ==
Planning a 30-minute series, by 1951 CBS had bought the rights to The Egg and I and made a pilot film with William Prince and Diana Lynn in the leading roles. (Another source says that Eddie Albert was the male lead and that the characters' names were Jim Blake and Betty Blake.)
