= Ma and Pa Kettle Back on the Farm =

1951 film by Edward Sedgwick

- Theatrical release poster
- Directed by: Edward Sedgwick
- Written by: Jack Henley
- Based on: The Egg and I 1945 novel by Betty MacDonald
- Produced by: Leonard Goldstein
- Starring: Marjorie Main; Percy Kilbride
- Cinematography: Charles Van Enger
- Edited by: Russell F. Schoengarth
- Music by: Joseph Gershenson
- Production company: Universal Pictures
- Distributed by: Universal Pictures
- Release date: May 10, 1951 (New York)
- Running time: 80 minutes
- Country: United States
- Language: English
- Box office: $2,350,000 (U.S. rentals)

Ma and Pa Kettle Back on the Farm is a 1951 Universal Pictures American comedy film. It is the third installment of Universal-International's Ma and Pa Kettle series starring Marjorie Main and Percy Kilbride and the final completed film of director Edward Sedgwick's long career.

== Plot ==
Ma and Pa Kettle return home from a New York City pleasure trip and learn that their son Tom and his wife Kim are expecting a child. The Kettles receive a telegram from Kim's parents Jonathan and Elizabeth Parker, refined Bostonians, declaring that they will soon arrive to see the baby, a boy also named Jonathan. The Parkers arrive and are astounded upon their first impression of the Kettles. Ma and Elizabeth don't get acquainted very well—which is the reason why the Kettles leave their modern house to return to their beloved ramshackle farmhouse.

While Pa and his Indian friends, Geoduck and the mute Crowbar, blast a new well, two shady men searching for uranium deposits find evidence in the farm soil. Pa falls into the well, and upon climbing out he discovers that he can spontaneously generate electricity. Mr. Parker, a retired mine owner appreciates the Kettles' hominess, deduces that Pa's radioactivity must be the result of uranium-rich soil in his pockets. He informs the Kettles that they are about to become very rich. They then discuss with Geoduck, Crowbar and their friend, local salesman Billy Reed, how they would like to share the profits among them all.

Tom arrives and informs them that Mrs. Parker has persuaded Kim to leave him and remove the baby from the hospital, where he is under treatment for a cold, back to Boston. That night, Billy, Geoduck and Crowbar sneak into the hospital and attempt to steal the baby for Tom. Each man mistakenly grabs a girl baby instead of little Jonathan. When the sheriff arrives, Ma and Pa trick him into returning the babies without pressing charges. The next day, the two shady men inform Ma and Pa that they have bought the farm by paying the back taxes owed on it, but Mr. Parker summons a uranium expert to convince them that the land is useless. The men agree to give Pa the deed to the farm and ten dollars. As soon as they leave, the expert reveals to Parker that the land really is barren, and Mr. Parker realizes that the only radioactive element on the property is Pa's coveralls, which his nephew wore during overseas atomic-bomb tests.

As the Kettles celebrate the payment of their back taxes, Tom announces that Mrs. Parker and Kim have boarded a train to Boston, and Mr. Parker, Tom, Ma and Pa pursue them. They stop the train, and when Tom faces Kim and Mr. Parker rebukes his wife for the first time, Mrs. Parker realizes the error of her ways. However, Mrs. Parker and Ma cannot disembark in time, and they are forced to use a railroad handcar to return home. By the time that Pa, Mr. Parker, Tom and Kim return to the house, Ma and Mrs. Parker have prepared dinner for the whole family.

== Cast ==
- Marjorie Main as Ma Kettle
- Percy Kilbride as Pa Kettle
- Richard Long as Tom Kettle
- Meg Randall as Kim Parker Kettle
- Ray Collins as Jonathan Parker
- Barbara Brown as Elizabeth Parker
- Emory Parnell as Billy Reed
- Peter Leeds as Manson
- Teddy Hart as Crowbar
- Oliver Blake as Geoduck
- Rex Lease as Clallan County Sheriff (uncredited)
- J.P. Sloane as Billy Kettle (uncredited)
- Edward Clark (uncredited)
- Edmund Cobb (uncredited)
- Harold Goodwin (uncredited)
- Jerry Hausner (uncredited)
- Teddy Infuhr (uncredited)
- Jack Ingram (uncredited)
- Sherry Jackson (uncredited)
- Harry von Zell (uncredited)

== Production ==
The film was originally entitled Ma and Pa Kettle Have a Baby. Filming started on February 11, 1950.

== Reception ==
In a contemporary review for The New York Times, critic Thomas M. Pryor wrote: "[I]t can be said that this is the type of picture that neither bores nor stimulates, but if you arc indulgent you might be rewarded with a few mild chuckles. ... The story which holds the picture together is a ramshackle affair that has Tom Kettle's haughty mother-in-law causing a lot of commotion with her newfangled ideas about raising a baby. No use telling you how Ma, who raised fifteen kids of her own, feels about this, however. It really doesn't matter because with Marjorie Main and Percy Kilbride on the screen practically all of the time the story would be overwhelmed in any event."
