= Ma and Pa Kettle Go to Town =

1950 film by Charles Lamont

- Theatrical release poster
- Directed by: Charles Lamont
- Written by: Martin Ragaway; Leonard Stern
- Based on: The Egg and I by Betty MacDonald
- Produced by: Leonard Goldstein
- Starring: Marjorie Main; Percy Kilbride
- Cinematography: Charles Van Enger
- Edited by: Russell F. Schoengarth
- Music by: Milton Schwarzwald
- Color process: Black and white
- Production company: Universal INternational Pictures
- Distributed by: Universal Pictures
- Release date: 1950
- Running time: 79 minutes
- Country: United States
- Language: English
- Box office: $2,175,000 (US rentals)

Ma and Pa Kettle Go to Town is a 1950 American comedy film directed by Charles Lamont. It is the second installment of Universal-International's Ma and Pa Kettle series starring Marjorie Main and Percy Kilbride.

== Plot ==
At the conclusion of Ma and Pa Kettle, Pa receives a telegram stating that he has won another jingle-writing contest, this one from the Bubble-Ola Company. The prize is an all-expenses paid trip to New York City. Ma tells Pa that they can't go because they have no one to look out for the kids. Meanwhile, fleeing bank robber Shotgun Munger has a flat tire and crashes into the old Kettle Farm. Pa comes along and after Munger convinces Pa that he is an eccentric poet "Mr. Jones", he agrees to stay and watch over the kids for the Kettles (he is trying to hide from the police) if they will deliver a bag to his "brother" Louie in New York.

Ma and Pa Kettle go by train to New York City, where their son Tom and daughter-in-law Kim live while Tom is trying to finance his chicken incubator (from the first movie). The bag Pa agreed to bring to New York, containing $100,000 from the bank robbery, was not with their luggage when they checked into the Waldorf Astoria Hotel, having been stolen while they were distracted at the busy station. He buys several new bags to give to Louie, but each time the empty new bag is stolen by one of Louie's confederates, who believe Pa is also a crook trying to keep part of the cash. Finally Pa agrees to meet Louie by the monkey cage at the Central Park Zoo with yet another bag.

Pa is mistaken by the police for a maniac poisoning monkeys at the zoo and arrested. Tom convinces the police of Pa's innocence and helps them unravel the mystery of the bags and the identity of "Mr. Jones". The missing bag is found in the luggage of a rich investor who invites the Kettles to his home for a party, where the police are able to round up the entire gang with the bag of money as evidence. The investor makes a deal with Tom to finance his invention. The Kettles return home to discover that the harried "Jones" has been overwhelmed by the 14 wild Kettle children and hogtied in a game of "cops and robbers", then turned over to police rushing to the house to "protect" them.

== Cast ==
- Marjorie Main as Ma Kettle
- Percy Kilbride as Pa Kettle
- Richard Long as Tom Kettle
- Meg Randall as Kim Parker Kettle
- Charles McGraw as Shotgun Mike Munger
- Jim Backus as Joseph 'Little Joe' Rogers
- Elliott Lewis as Detective Sam Boxer
- Bert Freed as Dutch, Third New York Henchman
- Hal March as Det. Mike Eskow

== Production ==
The film was originally called Ma and Pa Kettle Go to New York. Filming started 8 August 1949 in New York.
