= Ma and Pa Kettle (film) =

1949 film by Charles Lamont

- Theatrical release poster
- Directed by: Charles Lamont
- Screenplay by: Al Lewis; Herbert Margolis; Louis Morheim
- Based on: The Egg and I 1945 novel's characters by Betty MacDonald
- Produced by: Leonard Goldstein
- Starring: Marjorie Main; Percy Kilbride
- Cinematography: Maury Gertsman
- Edited by: Russell F. Schoengarth
- Music by: Milton Schwarzwald
- Production company: Universal Pictures
- Distributed by: Universal Pictures
- Release date: April 1, 1949
- Running time: 75 minutes
- Country: United States
- Language: English
- Budget: $200,000 or $500,000 or $380,000
- Box office: $2,850,000 (rentals) or $2.3 million

Ma and Pa Kettle (also known as The Further Adventures of Ma and Pa Kettle) is a 1949 American comedy film directed by Charles Lamont. It is the sequel to the 1947 film version of Betty MacDonald's semi-fictional memoir The Egg and I and the first official installment of Universal-International's Ma and Pa Kettle series starring Marjorie Main and Percy Kilbride.

== Plot ==
Ma and Pa Kettle have lived in a broken-down ramshackle farmhouse for twenty-five years in rural Cape Flattery, Washington. The Kettles' arch-nemesis, Birdie Hicks, organizes a town council meeting to condemn the Kettles' "garbage dump" farm. In order to receive a new tobacco pouch for entering a contest, Pa Kettle writes a slogan for the King Henry Tobacco Company.

During the council meeting to condemn the property, Alvin, the town's mailman, calls about a telegram declaring Pa Kettle the winner of the contest's grand prize of a new "house-of-the-future". Mayor Dwiggins is delighted and cancels the meeting in order to deliver the telegram personally to Pa. All of the council members arrive at Ma and Pa's farmhouse but are greeted by the 14 youngest Kettle children who, thinking they are defending their home from condemnation, attack them with slingshots and toy guns.

The Kettles' oldest son Tom, on his way home after graduating from college, meets easterner Kim Parker on the train and shows her his plans to improve a chicken incubator to make it more affordable for farmers. Kim is a young writer full of theories on the advantages of modern living, but when Tom learns of his family's windfall, he objects to the characterization that his upbringing had been one of "abject" poverty.

The family move into their large house-of-the-future. After Pa suffers a sunburned face from a heat lamp while shaving, he alone moves back to their old house to further avoid such troublesome gadgets. The jealous Birdie Hicks accuses Pa of plagiarizing his prize-winning slogan from traveling salesman Billy Reed, who has a similar one on a calendar. The bad publicity threatens Tom's chances for financing his incubator.

When Pa is disqualified from winning the prize, Ma and the kids have to literally fight off authorities trying to evict them from the modern house while Kim digs up proof that Pa thought up the slogan himself. Billy explains that he got his slogan from Pa, not vice versa, and they keep the house. Tom gets financing to manufacture his improved chicken incubator and marries Kim. At the ceremony Pa receives a telegram advising him that he has won another slogan contest, this time winning a free trip to New York.

== Cast ==
- Marjorie Main as Ma Kettle
- Percy Kilbride as Pa Kettle
- Richard Long as Tom Kettle
- Meg Randall as Kim Parker
- Esther Dale as Birdie Hicks
- Emory Parnell as Billy Reed
- Harry Antrim as Mayor Dwiggins
- Barry Kelley as Victor Tomkins
- O. Z. Whitehead as Mr. Billings
- Lester Allen as Geoduck
- Other uncredited players include John Beck, Teddy Infuhr, Wilbur Mack, Sam McDaniel, Gene Persson, Dewey Robinson, Eddy Waller and Chief Yowlachie

== Production ==
Helena Carter turned down the female romantic lead.

Filming started December 1948.

== Reception ==
The film was a big hit, grossing over $3 million. According to a Universal executive, "their stuff is burlesque and it isn't sophisticated, but the company found that the film is drawing not only the younger element but also the so-called lost audience of over 35 who don't go to the movies regularly."
