= Richard Long (actor) =

American actor (1927–1974)

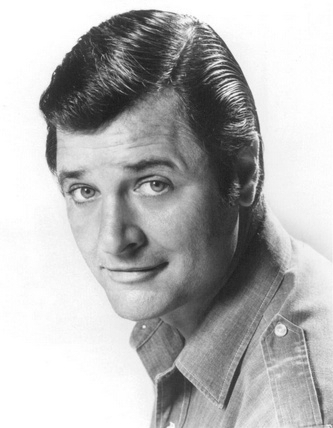
- Long in 1970
- Born: Richard McCord Long; December 17, 1927; Chicago, Illinois, U.S.
- Died: December 21, 1974 (aged 47); Los Angeles, California, U.S.
- Occupation: Actor
- Years active: 1946–1974
- Spouses: Suzan Ball (m. 1954; died 1955); Mara Corday (m. 1957)
- Children: 3
- Military career
- Allegiance: United States
- Branch: U.S. Army
- Service years: 1950–1952
- Rank: Private first class
- Conflicts: Korean War

Richard McCord Long (December 17, 1927 – December 21, 1974) was an American actor best known for his leading roles in three ABC television series, The Big Valley, Nanny and the Professor, and Bourbon Street Beat. He was also a series regular on ABC's 77 Sunset Strip during the 1961–1962 season.

== Career ==
=== Early films: International Pictures ===
In 1946, Long was cast in his first film, Tomorrow Is Forever, as Drew, the son of the characters played by Claudette Colbert and Orson Welles. The role had been unfilled for months, and producers selected Long, who most closely matched the credentials required. It was made by International Pictures, which put him under contract.

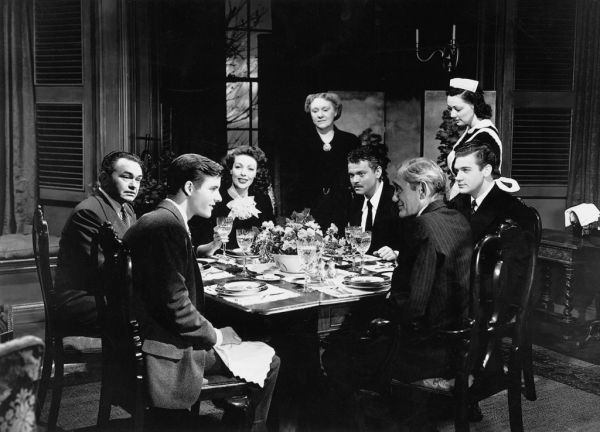
Left to right: Edward G. Robinson, Long, Loretta Young, Martha Wentworth, Orson Welles, Philip Merivale, Byron Keith, and an unidentified actress in The Stranger (1946)

Long impressed Welles, who cast the actor in The Stranger (1946), from International, as the younger brother of Loretta Young's character.

International was going to lend Long to 20th Century Fox to make Margie (1946), but then they changed their minds and put him in The Dark Mirror (1946) starring Olivia de Havilland and Thomas Mitchell and directed by Robert Siodmak.

=== Tom Kettle and Universal Pictures ===
International Pictures merged with Universal Pictures, which took over Long's contract. His fourth film was The Egg and I (1947), playing Tom Kettle, the eldest son of Ma and Pa Kettle, the characters played by Marjorie Main and Percy Kilbride. The movie was a huge hit – so much so that Universal decided to spin off the Kettles into their own series.

Long signed a contract with Universal, for which he appeared in Tap Roots (1948) and Criss Cross (1949), playing Burt Lancaster's brother in the latter for Siodmak. He supported William Bendix in The Life of Riley (1949) based on the NBC radio show.

Long reprised his role as Tom Kettle in Ma and Pa Kettle (1949), which was a solid success at the box office. So, too, was Ma and Pa Kettle Go to Town (1950). He was Frank James in the Western Kansas Raiders (1950).

In December 1950, Long was drafted into the U.S. Army during the Korean War. Before he left, he made Jet Men of the Air (1951), and then served for two years at Fort Ord, California.

Ma and Pa Kettle Back on the Farm (1952) was Long's fourth and final Kettle movie. He was the juvenile lead in Back at the Front (1952) and had supporting parts in All I Desire (1953), All American (1953) (as the villain to Tony Curtis's hero), Saskatchewan (1954), and Playgirl (1954).

Long began guest-starring on TV shows such as Lux Video Theater ("I'll Never Love Again") and was finally given a lead role by Universal in Cult of the Cobra (1955) – though still billed under Faith Domergue.

=== Television ===
Long focused on television over the next few years, guest-starring on episodes of shows such as Climax!, Screen Directors Playhouse, TV Reader's Digest, The United States Steel Hour, Hey, Jeannie!, Schlitz Playhouse, Suspicion, Alcoa Theatre, Wagon Train, Have Gun – Will Travel, The Millionaire, Matinee Theatre, The Twilight Zone episodes ("Number 12 Looks Just Like You" and "Person or Persons Unknown"), and The Further Adventures of Ellery Queen.

At Columbia, he had a top supporting role in the Western Fury at Gunsight Pass (1956) and in a Blake Edwards comedy, He Laughed Last (1956).

Long went to Japan to star in Tokyo After Dark (1959) and had a key role in William Castle's House on Haunted Hill (1959).

=== Maverick ===
Long signed a contract with Warner Bros. and guest-starred in many of their TV series, including Lawman.

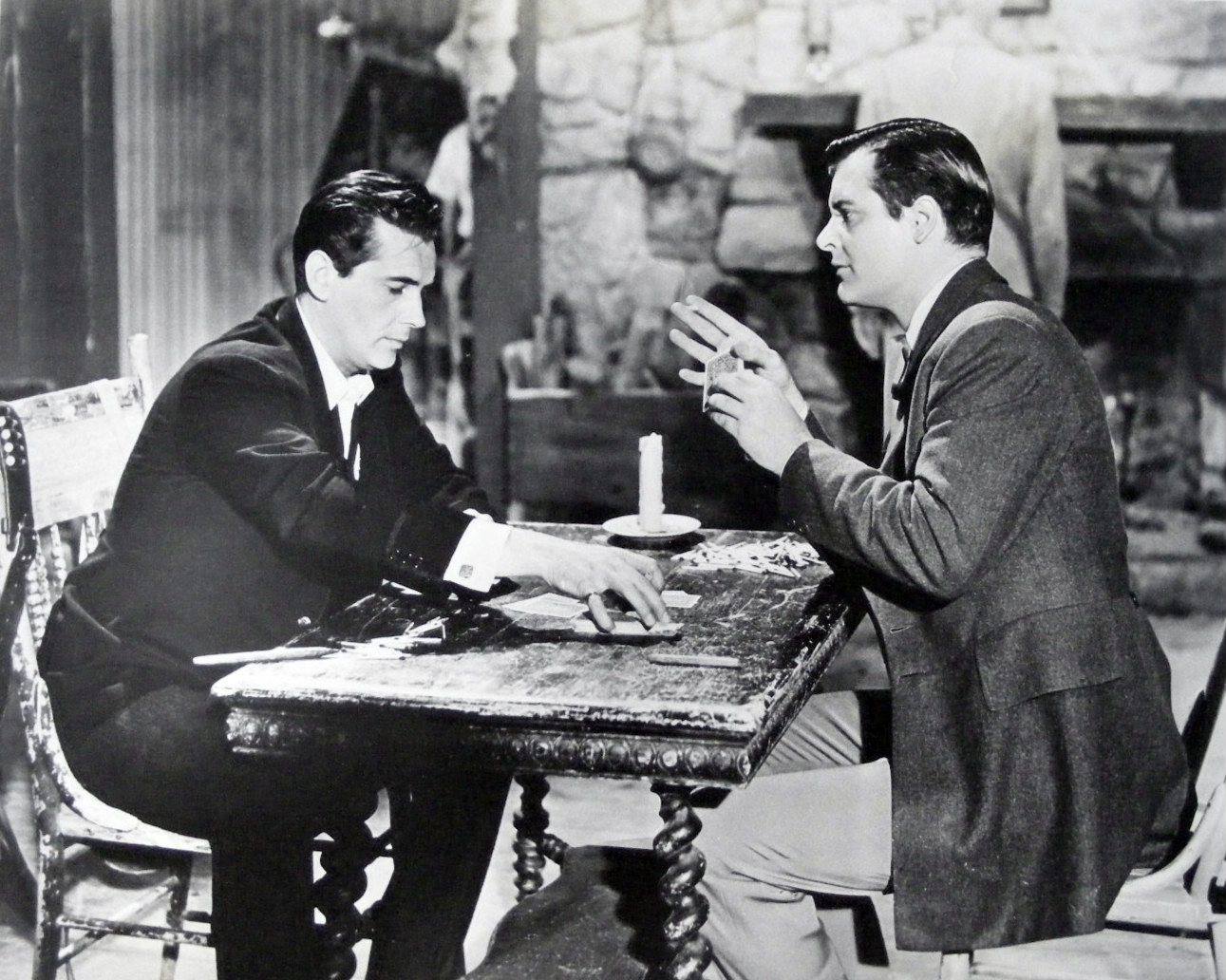
Jack Kelly as Bart Maverick and Long as Gentleman Jack Darby in Maverick, 1959

He played the recurring role of gambler/con artist Gentleman Jack Darby in four episodes of the ABC/WB Western series Maverick beginning in 1958, including the memorable "Shady Deal at Sunny Acres" installment. His character always interacted with Jack Kelly as Bart Maverick, including in "Shady Deal at Sunny Acres", which starred both James Garner and Kelly. He also never appeared with later series regular Roger Moore. Gentleman Jack Darby was created by Maverick producer Roy Huggins as a replacement for "Dandy Jim Buckley", played by Efrem Zimbalist Jr., after Zimbalist had moved on to his own series, 77 Sunset Strip.

Warner Bros. starred Long in a show, Bourbon Street Beat (1959–60) as Rex Randolph, Private Eye, which ran for only 39 episodes. with Andrew Duggan, Van Williams, and Arlene Howell.

=== 77 Sunset Strip ===
Long reprised his character on episodes of Hawaiian Eye and joined the cast of 77 Sunset Strip from 1960 to 1962.

Long continued to guest star on shows such as Thriller, Tales of Wells Fargo, Alfred Hitchcock Presents, and The Twilight Zone ("Person or Persons Unknown").

He returned to films with a role in the MGM romantic musical Follow the Boys, along with co-stars Connie Francis, Paula Prentiss, and Roger Perry. He did The Tenderfoot (1964) for Walt Disney's Wonderful World of Color.

In 1963, Long guest-starred in the episode "Hear No Evil" of ABC's Going My Way, a drama series starring Gene Kelly about a Catholic priest in New York City loosely based on the 1944 Bing Crosby movie. That same year, he was cast as Eddie Breech in the episode "Blood Bargain" of CBS's The Alfred Hitchcock Hour.

Long went to Finland to make a film, Make Like a Thief (1965), which he also helped direct. "I've had the longest awkward period in the history of Hollywood", he said around this time. "I sign more autographs than anyone in the industry. They either think I'm Robert Goulet, Gig Young, Robert Sterling, or myself. We don't look a thing alike if we're together, but there is a flash similarity."

Long added that he hoped to play more character parts. "I'm rotting from the inside out and it's just gotten to my face", he said. "A man doesn't get interesting on screen until his 40s."

=== The Big Valley ===
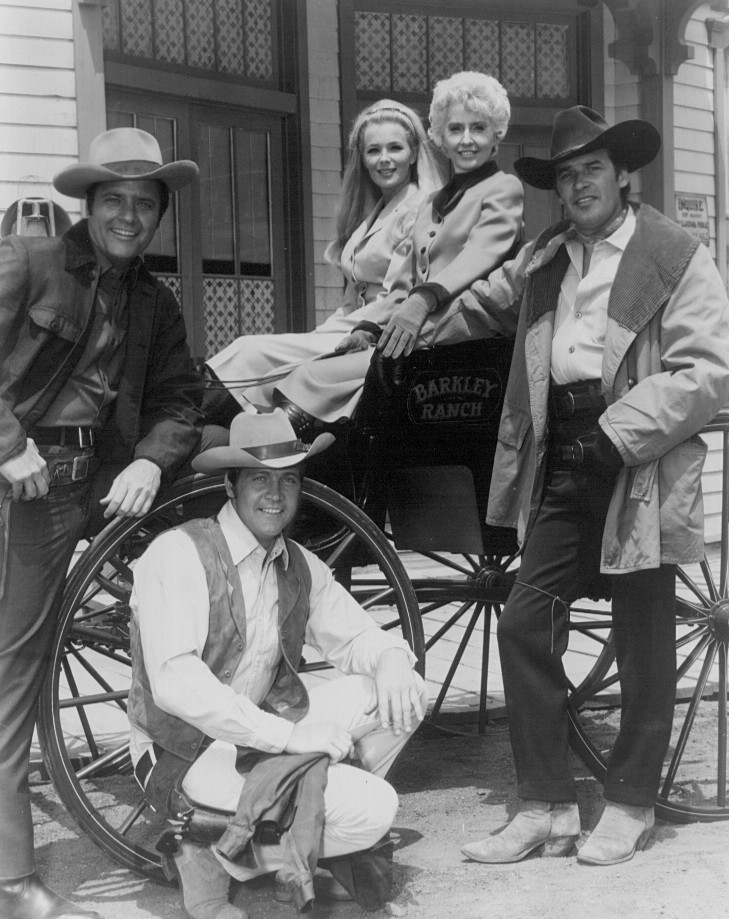
The Big Valley cast with Long at far left

In 1965, at the age of 38, Long began his role as attorney Jarrod Barkley, the oldest son of rancher Victoria Barkley (Barbara Stanwyck), in 112 episodes of The Big Valley, the last of the major Four Star Television series, a Western that ran on ABC from 1965 to 1969. The series was set in the 1870s. Long also directed 2 episodes of The Big Valley. (In 1953, Long had costarred with Stanwyck in the film All I Desire.)

=== Nanny and the Professor ===
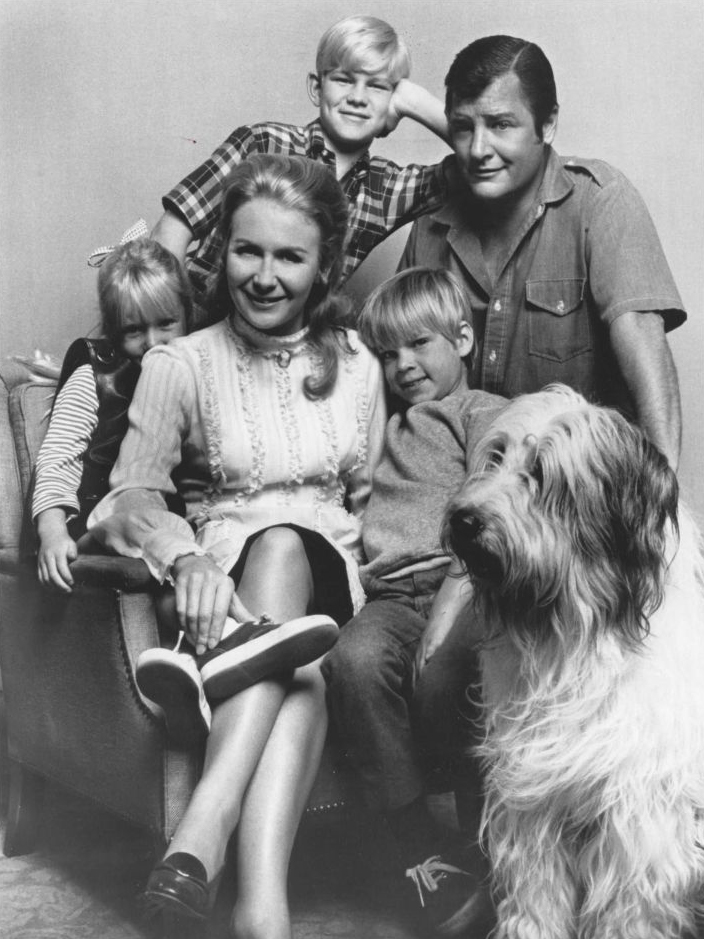
Nanny and the Professor cast

In 1970–71, Long and Juliet Mills starred in the ABC sitcom Nanny and the Professor.

Long and Mills later provided their voices for two animated-film versions of the show: Nanny and the Professor (1972) and Nanny and the Professor and the Phantom of the Circus (1973).

=== Thicker Than Water ===
In 1973, he starred alongside Julie Harris in the short-lived series, Thicker than Water.

His last jobs were the TV movies The Girl Who Came Gift-Wrapped (1974) and Death Cruise (1974).

== Personal life ==
Long served in the U.S. Army for two years during the Korean War, where he was posted to Fort Ord, California, alongside actors Martin Milner, David Janssen, and Clint Eastwood. He was also stationed in Tokyo, Japan.

Long was twice married: his first wife, singer and actress Suzan Ball, whom he married on April 11, 1954, died of cancer 16 months later, at age 21. They had met in 1953, after her cancer diagnosis; her right leg was amputated in early 1954 and they married in April.

In 1957, he married actress/model Mara Corday in Las Vegas. The couple had three children together. In 1961, Long was arrested by police after Corday accused him of attacking her while drunk. Corday declined to pursue the charges, and after initially indicating she would file for divorce, she later reconciled with Long.

== Death ==
As a youth, Long contracted pneumonia, which apparently weakened his heart. He later experienced cardiac problems as an adult and suffered his first heart attack in 1961. After a month-long stay in Tarzana Medical Center in Los Angeles to treat additional attacks, he died on December 21, 1974, four days after his 47th birthday.

== Filmography ==
Film
Year	Title	Role	Notes
1946	Tomorrow Is Forever	Drew Hamilton	
1946	The Stranger	Noah Longstreet	
1946	The Dark Mirror	Rusty	
1947	The Egg and I	Tom Kettle	
1948	Tap Roots	Bruce Dabney	
1949	The Life of Riley	Jeff Taylor	
1949	Criss Cross	Slade Thompson	
1949	Ma and Pa Kettle	Tom Kettle	
1950	Kansas Raiders	Frank James	
1950	Ma and Pa Kettle Go to Town	Tom Kettle	
1951	Air Cadet	Russ Coulter	Alternate title: Jet Men on the Air
1951	Ma and Pa Kettle Back on the Farm	Tom Kettle	
1952	Back at the Front	Sergeant Rose	Alternate title: Willie and Joe in Tokyo
1953	All I Desire	Russ Underwood	
1953	All American	Howard Carter	Alternate title: The Winning Way
1954	Saskatchewan	Abbott	Alternate title: O'Rourke of the Royal Mounted
1954	Playgirl	Barron Courtney III	
1955	Cult of the Cobra	Paul Able	
1956	He Laughed Last	Jimmy Murphy	
1956	Fury at Gunsight Pass	Roy Hanford	
1959	House on Haunted Hill	Lance Schroeder	
1959	Tokyo After Dark	Sergeant Robert Douglas	
1963	Follow the Boys	Lieutenant Peter Langley	
1964	Make Like a Thief	V. Bartley "Bart" Lanigan	
1972	Nanny and the Professor	Professor Harold Everett (voice)	Animated film
1973	Nanny and the Professor and the Phantom of the Circus	Professor Harold Everett (voice)	Animated film
1974	The Girl Who Came Gift-Wrapped	Michael Green	ABC Movie of the Week
1974	Death Cruise	Jerry Carter	ABC Movie of the Week (final film role)
Television series
Year	Title	Role	Notes
1958–59	Maverick	"Gentleman" Jack Darby	4 episodes
1958–63	77 Sunset Strip	Marc Harrington / Tony Wendice / Rex Randolph / Dick Lynwood / Charlie Carmichael	31 episodes
1959–60	Bourbon Street Beat	Rex Randolph	38 episodes
1962	Alfred Hitchcock Presents	Paul Devore	Season 7 Episode 33: "The Opportunity"
1962	The Twilight Zone	David Andrew Gurney	Season 3 Episode 27: "Person or Persons Unknown"
1963	The Alfred Hitchcock Hour	Eddie Breech	Season 2 Episode 5: "Blood Bargain"
1964	The Twilight Zone	Uncle Rick / Dr. Rex / Professor Sigmund Friend / Tom /...	Season 5 Episode 17: "Number 12 Looks Just Like You"
1965–69	The Big Valley	Jarrod Barkley	98 episodes
1970	Love, American Style	Reverend Richard Atkins	Season 1 Episode 24:"Love And The Minister"
1970–71	Nanny and the Professor	Professor Harold Everett	54 episodes
1972–73	Thicker than Water	Ernie Paine	9 episodes
1974	Match Game '74	Himself	5 episodes
