= The Egg and I (film) =

1947 film by Chester Erskine

- 1954 re-release film poster
- Directed by: Chester Erskine
- Screenplay by: Chester Erskine; Fred F. Finklehoffe
- Based on: The Egg and I 1945 novel by Betty MacDonald
- Produced by: Chester Erskine; Fred F. Finklehoffe; Leonard Goldstein (associate producer)
- Starring: Claudette Colbert; Fred MacMurray; Marjorie Main
- Cinematography: Milton R. Krasner
- Edited by: Russell F. Schoengarth
- Music by: Frank Skinner
- Production company: Universal Pictures
- Distributed by: Universal Pictures
- Release dates: March 21, 1947 (Los Angeles, premiere)
- Running time: 108 minutes
- Country: United States
- Language: English
- Budget: $1,900,000
- Box office: $5.5 million (U.S. and Canada rentals)

The Egg and I is a 1947 American romantic comedy film directed by Chester Erskine, who co-wrote the screenplay with Fred F. Finklehoffe, based on the book of the same name by Betty MacDonald and starring Claudette Colbert and Fred MacMurray, with Marjorie Main and Percy Kilbride as Ma and Pa Kettle.

The box office success of The Egg and I influenced the production of Universal-International's Ma and Pa Kettle series, which consists of nine feature films most of which star Main and Kilbride together.

At the 20th Academy Awards, Main was nominated for Best Actress in a Supporting Role.

== Plot ==
The film tells the story of a young married couple who become chicken farmers. Betty follows her husband Bob to the countryside where his dream is to be a successful chicken farmer. The problem is, their home is old and needs to be repaired and the baby chicks need constant care. When a rich single woman with a new house and new farm equipment flirts with Bob, Betty questions their decision to move to the farm in the first place. In the end, she finds out that Bob was trying to buy the new house for Betty as a surprise. In the end, Bob and Betty celebrate the birth of their newborn daughter, Anne.

== Cast ==
- Claudette Colbert as Betty MacDonald
- Fred MacMurray as Bob MacDonald
- Marjorie Main as Ma Kettle
- Louise Allbritton as Harriet Putnam
- Percy Kilbride as Pa Kettle
- Richard Long as Tom Kettle
- Billy House as Billy Reed
- Ida Moore as Emily (the old lady)
- Donald MacBride as Mr. Henty
- Samuel S. Hinds as Sheriff
- Esther Dale as Birdie Hicks
- Elisabeth Risdon as Birdie's Mother
- John Berkes as Geoduck
- Victor Potel as Crowbar
- Fuzzy Knight as Cab Driver
- Penny Higson as Anne

== Production crew ==
- Production Design .... Bernard Herzbrun
- Set Decoration .... Oliver Emert / Russell A. Gausman
- Hair Stylist .... Carmen Dirigo
- Makeup Artist .... Jack P. Pierce
- Assistant Director .... Frank Shaw
- Second Unit Director .... Jack Hively (uncredited)
- Sound Technician .... Glenn E. Anderson
- Sound .... Charles Felstead
- Orchestrator .... David Tamkin
- Composer: Stock Music .... Sam Perry (uncredited)

== Reception ==
The Egg and I was a box office success, earning $5.5 million in domestic theatrical rentals against its budget of $1.9 million.

== Radio and television adaptations ==
- The Egg and I was presented on This Is Hollywood on January 4, 1947, with Colbert and MacMurray reprising their movie roles. The adaptation was unusual in that it preceded the film's release.
- The Egg and I was presented on Hallmark Playhouse January 5, 1950, with Colbert again starring in her movie role.
- The Egg and I was performed as a one-hour radio play on the May 5, 1947 broadcast of Lux Radio Theatre, with both Claudette Colbert and Fred MacMurray reprising their movie roles.
- The Egg and I was broadcast on CBS television as a weekday serial from September 3, 1951, to August 1, 1952.
