= Emory Parnell =

American actor (1892–1979)

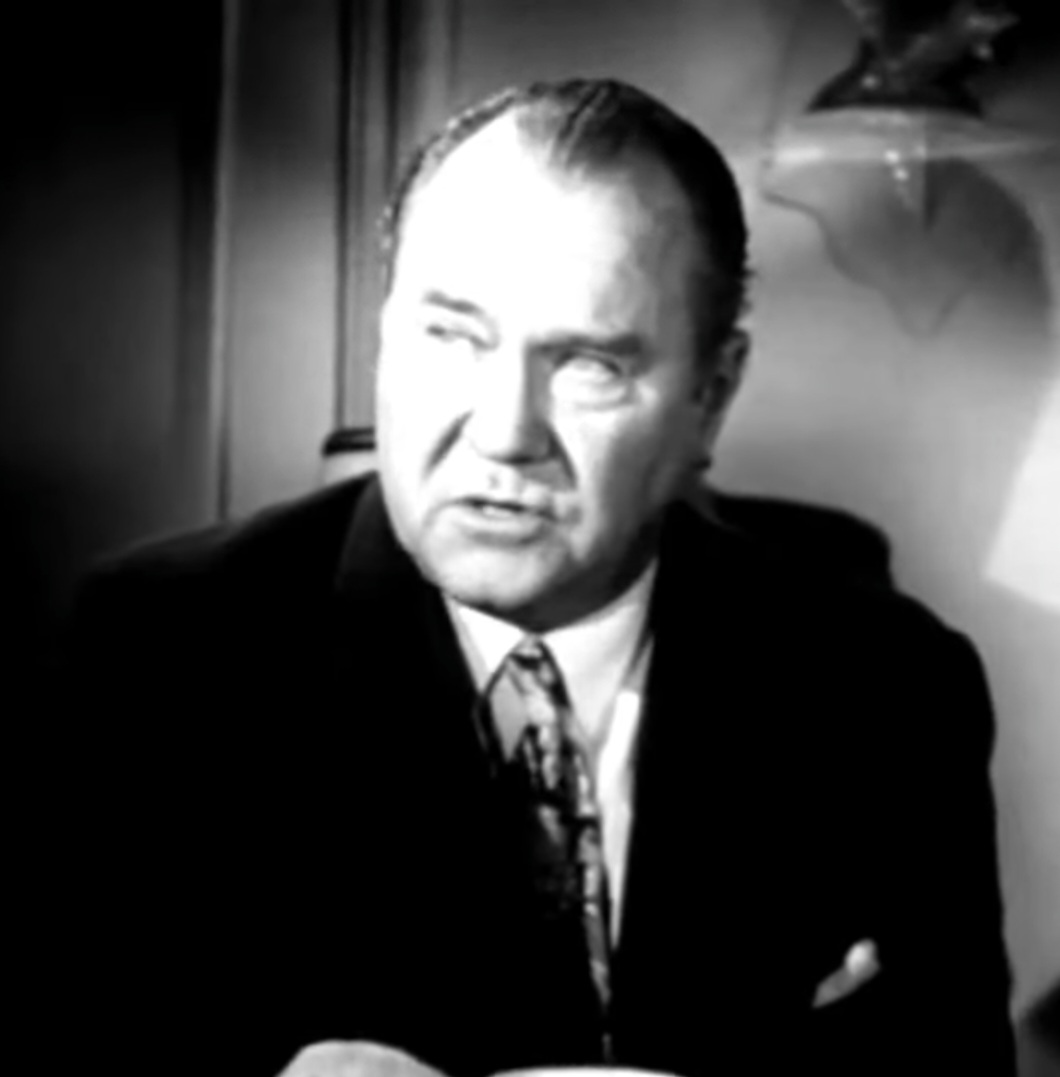
- Parnell in Blonde Ice (1948)
- Born: December 29, 1892; Saint Paul, Minnesota, U.S.
- Died: June 22, 1979 (aged 86); Woodland Hills, Los Angeles, California, U.S.
- Other names: Emery Parnell; Emory Parnel
- Occupations: Actor; vaudevillian
- Years active: 1938–1973
- Spouse: Effie Laird
- Children: 2; including James Parnell

Emory Parnell (December 29, 1892 – June 22, 1979) was an American vaudeville performer and actor who appeared in over 250 films in his 36-year career.

== Early years ==
Parnell was born in St. Paul, Minnesota. He spent eight months in the Arctic in 1929, looking for gold in that area's wastelands. He also worked as a telegrapher.

== Music ==
Parnell spent his early years as a concert violinist. He performed on the Chautauqua and Lyceum circuits until 1930, when he relocated to Detroit, Michigan, to narrate and act in commercial and industrial films. A 1923 newspaper article described an upcoming Lyceum performance of "Emory Parnell, the one man band," saying that Parnell "plays an accordion, the snare drum and base [sic] drum, all at the same time."

During part of the Chautauqua years, Parnell had a family act that included his wife. In 1970, she recalled, "[w]e covered every state as well as Canada, Alaska and New Zealand." The Parnells resumed the act during the Korean War, doing "three to six programs a week in Army camps."

== Film ==
Seeking better opportunities in Hollywood, Parnell and his wife moved to Los Angeles, California, where, helped by his red-faced Irish look of frustration, he immediately began to appear in films in roles such as policemen, doormen, landlords, and small town businessmen. One of his first films was Doctor Rhythm (1938).

Although his appearances were often in "B" films (playing storekeeper Billy Reed in several of the Ma and Pa Kettle movies), he also performed in "A" films, including portraying a Paramount studio executive who sang about avoiding libel suits to open 1941's Louisiana Purchase. Parnell was also part of writer-director Preston Sturges' unofficial "stock company" of character actors in the 1940s, appearing in five of Sturges's films, including The Miracle of Morgan's Creek, where he played the mean-spirited Mr. Tuerck, the chief antagonist of Constable Kockenlocker (played by William Demarest). He also appeared as grumpy socialite Ajax Bullion in the Three Stooges short subject All the World's a Stooge.

== Radio ==
In the late 1930s, Parnell was a member of the cast of Grouch Club on NBC.

== Stage ==
In May 1949, Parnell appeared on Broadway for the first and only time, in the play Mr. Adam, which ran for only five performances.

== Television ==
In the 1950s, Parnell began to appear on television in dramatic shows and situation comedies in roles similar to those that he had played in films. He portrayed William Bendix's factory foreman, Hank Hawkins, on The Life of Riley, and Bill Anders on five episodes of the ABC/Warner Brothers western series, Maverick.

Parnell appeared on the ABC/WB series, Conflict and The Alaskans, with Roger Moore, and a related NBC series, Klondike, with James Coburn and Ralph Taeger. He appeared in 1958 as fire chief Sam Carter in the television series The Real McCoys (S1E34 “Volunteer Fire Department”), and in 1960 in Waldo, an unsold television pilot that aired as an episode of the anthology series New Comedy Showcase. In 1961, he appeared as Ira Ponder in the western series Bat Masterson (S3E18 "The Prescott Campaign"). He appeared in an episode of the NBC family drama, National Velvet and in a 1964 episode of Perry Mason as an angry investor in "The Case of the Latent Lover". In 1966 he portrayed Sheriff Blake in "Jury at the Shady Rest" on Petticoat Junction and in "Pig in a Poke" on Green Acres.

== Later years ==
As late as 1970, Parnell was traveling and entertaining with a family act—himself, his wife, and their grandson, Dennis Parnell.

Parnell's last acting appearance on television was in 1971 as a prospector on CBS's Gunsmoke. His last film role was as a bartender in the 1972 film, Girls on the Road. His final public appearance came in 1974, when he and his wife were interviewed by TV talk-show host Tom Snyder along with other residents of the Motion Picture Country Home and Hospital.

== Personal life ==
Parnell was married to Effie Laird, an actress who appeared with him both in vaudeville and in films. They had two children together, one of whom, James Parnell, also became an actor. His son James died in 1961.

Parnell owned a 36-foot yacht and was a member of the United States Coast Guard Reserve.

== Selected filmography ==
- Arson Gang Busters (1938) as Chief J.P. Riley
- Call of the Yukon (1938) as Swenson (uncredited)
- Doctor Rhythm (1938) as Sgt. Olson (uncredited)
- I Am the Law (1938) as Detective Brophy (uncredited)
- King of Alcatraz (1938) as Olaf
- The Mad Miss Manton (1938) as Doorman (uncredited)
- Girls on Probation (1938) as Officer Craig (uncredited)
- Illegal Traffic (1938) as Lieutenant (uncredited)
- Angels with Dirty Faces (1938) as Officer McMann (uncredited)
- Blondie (1938) as Police Desk Sergeant (uncredited)
- Sweethearts (1938) as Fire Inspector (uncredited)
- Pacific Liner (1939) as Olaf
- Off the Record (1939) as Policeman (uncredited)
- Idiot's Delight (1939) as Fifth Avenue Mounted Cop (uncredited)
- St. Louis Blues (1939) as Policeman White (uncredited)
- Twelve Crowded Hours (1939) as Doorkeeper (uncredited)
- Let Freedom Ring (1939) as Axel - 1st Swede (uncredited)
- You Can't Get Away with Murder (1939) as Second Detective (uncredited)
- Sudden Money (1939) as Cop (uncredited)
- The Lady and the Mob (1939) as Policeman Riley (uncredited)
- East Side of Heaven (1939) as Doorman (uncredited)
- Union Pacific (1939) as Foreman (uncredited)
- Unmarried (1939) as Cop (uncredited)
- The House of Fear (1939) as Policeman (uncredited)
- They Shall Have Music (1939) as Policeman in Rain (uncredited)
- The Spellbinder (1939) as Club 88 Doorman (uncredited)
- Winter Carnival (1939) as Williams - Editor (uncredited)
- I Stole a Million (1939) as Friendly Cop at Flower Shop (uncredited)
- The Star Maker (1939) as Mr. Olson
- The Day the Bookies Wept (1939) as Motor Cop (uncredited)
- At the Circus aka The Marx Brothers at the Circus (1939) as Ringmaster (uncredited)
- Sued for Libel (1939) as Jerome Walsh
- On Dress Parade (1939) as Paddy - Policeman (uncredited)
- Little Accident (1939) as Policeman (uncredited)
- The Roaring Twenties (1939) as Gangster (uncredited)
- One Hour to Live (1939) as Fats Monoham
- The Secret of Dr. Kildare (1939) as Policeman on Gaylor Ave.(uncredited)
- Invisible Stripes (1939) as Policeman Outside Bank (uncredited)
- Abe Lincoln in Illinois (1940) as Minor Role (uncredited)
- Young Tom Edison (1940) as Bob (uncredited)
- Blondie on a Budget (1940) as Policeman Dempsey (uncredited)
- If I Had My Way (1940) as Gustav Erickson (uncredited)
- Those Were the Days! (1940) as Jailer (uncredited)
- Out West with the Peppers (1940) as Ole
- The Great McGinty (1940) as Policeman at Soup Kitchen (uncredited)
- Stranger on the Third Floor (1940) as Detective (uncredited)
- Foreign Correspondent (1940) as Captain John Martin of "The Mohican"
- The Golden Fleecing (1940) as Featherway (uncredited)
- Hit Parade of 1941 (1940) (uncredited)
- North West Mounted Police (1940) as George Higgins (uncredited)
- The Devil's Pipeline (1940) as R. J. Adams
- A Night at Earl Carroll's (1940) as Policeman (uncredited)
- Babes on Broadway (1941) as Inspector Moriarity (uncredited)
- Dangerously They Live (1941) as John Dill (uncredited)
- Law of the Tropics (1941) as Bartender (uncredited)
- Mob Town (1941) as Captain Harrington - Police Chief (uncredited)
- Honky Tonk (1941) as Dr. Otis (uncredited)
- Nine Lives Are Not Enough (1941) as Lieutenant Buckley (uncredited)
- Manpower (1941) as Cully (uncredited)
- Blondie in Society (1941) as Chief of Police (uncredited)
- For Beauty's Sake (1941) as Police Lt. Doleman (uncredited)
- Thieves Fall Out (1941) as Policeman (uncredited)
- The Wagons Roll at Night (1941) as Doc (uncredited)
- Strange Alibi (1941) as Captain Alibi (uncredited)
- Washington Melodrama (1941) as Simpson (uncredited)
- The Sea Wolf (1941) as First Detective (uncredited)
- Golden Hoofs (1941) as Booth (uncredited)
- The Trial of Mary Dugan (1941) as John Dugan (uncredited)
- Western Union (1941) as Sheriff (uncredited)
- The Case of the Black Parrot (1941) as Simmonds
- So Ends Our Night (1941) as Weiss
- Mr. & Mrs. Smith (1941) as Conway (uncredited)
- The Monster and the Girl (1941) as Policeman in Alley (uncredited)
- A Shot in the Dark (1941) as Marsotti
- The Lady from Cheyenne (1941) as Crowley (uncredited)
- Blossoms in the Dust (1941) as Texas Senator (uncredited)
- Kiss the Boys Goodbye (1941) as Deputy (uncredited)
- Three Sons o' Guns (1941) as Delivery Man (uncredited)
- The Maltese Falcon (1941) as Mate of the La Paloma (uncredited)
- All the World's a Stooge (1941) as Ajax Bullion
- The Blonde from Singapore (1941) as Capt. Nelson
- Unholy Partners (1941) as Col. Mason
- Sullivan's Travels (1941) as Rail Yard Bull (uncredited)
- Johnny Eager (1941) as Policeman (uncredited)
- Louisiana Purchase (1941) as Sam Horowitz - Lawyer
- All Through the Night (1942) as Cop Outside Warehouse (uncredited)
- Cadets on Parade (1942) as Inspector Kennedy
- Obliging Young Lady (1942) as Motorcycle Policeman Behind Billboard (uncredited)
- Kings Row (1942) as Harley Davis (uncredited)
- The Remarkable Andrew (1942) as Policeman (uncredited)
- Reap the Wild Wind (1942) as Jailer (uncredited)
- Two Yanks in Trinidad (1942) as Police Chief (uncredited)
- Saboteur (1942) as Henry - Husband in Movie (uncredited)
- Larceny, Inc. (1942) as Police Officer O'Casey (uncredited)
- Syncopation (1942) as Judge (uncredited)
- They All Kissed the Bride (1942) as Mahoney
- Night in New Orleans (1942) as Jensen (uncredited)
- Little Tokyo, U.S.A. (1942) as Slavin (uncredited)
- The Pride of the Yankees (1942) as Chicago Policeman O'Doal (uncredited)
- Wings for the Eagle (1942) as Policeman
- Apache Trail (1942) as Mr. Walters (uncredited)
- The Major and the Minor (1942) as Conductor #2 (uncredited)
- Highways by Night (1942) as Police Sergeant Ransome
- I Married a Witch (1942) as Allen - Hotel Owner (uncredited)
- Once Upon a Honeymoon (1942) as Quisling (uncredited)
- Gentleman Jim (1942) as Dennis Simmons - Doorman (uncredited)
- Over My Dead Body (1942) as Police Capt. Grady
- Arabian Nights (1942) as Harem Sentry
- The Hard Way (1943) as Mac - Policeman at Hospital (uncredited)
- London Blackout Murders (1943) as Henryk Peterson (uncredited)
- The Outlaw (1943) as Dolan - Man Entering Saloon (uncredited)
- The Human Comedy (1943) as Policeman with Scared Ulysses (uncredited)
- Slightly Dangerous (1943) as Policeman of Newspaper Office (uncredited)
- Mission to Moscow (1943) as Uncaring Businessman (uncredited)
- It's a Great Life (1943) as Policeman (uncredited)
- That Nazty Nuisance (1943) as Capt. Spense
- Du Barry Was a Lady (1943) as Gatekeeper (uncredited)
- Mr. Lucky (1943) as Dock Watchman (uncredited)
- Two Senoritas from Chicago (1943) as Rupert Shannon
- Young Ideas (1943) as Judge Canute J.Kelly
- Let's Face It (1943) as Colonel (uncredited)
- Dangerous Blondes (1943) as Officer McGuire (uncredited)
- The Unknown Guest (1943) as Sheriff Dave Larsen
- You're a Lucky Fellow, Mr. Smith as Conductor (uncredited)
- Government Girl (1943) as The Chief (uncredited)
- The Dancing Masters (1943) as Featherstone (uncredited)
- The Miracle of Morgan's Creek (1943) as Mr. Tuerck
- Address Unknown (1944) as Postman
- Seven Days Ashore (1944) as Captain Harvey (uncredited)
- Andy Hardy's Blonde Trouble (1944) as Train Conductor (uncredited)
- Once Upon a Time (1944) as Radio Cart Cop (uncredited)
- Gildersleeve's Ghost (1944) as Police Commissioner Haley
- A Night of Adventure (1944) as Judge
- Wilson (1944) as Chairman of Democratic Committee (uncredited)
- The Great Moment (1944) as Mr. Gruber (uncredited)
- The Falcon in Mexico (1944) as Winthrop 'Lucky Diamond' Hughes
- Casanova Brown (1944) as Frank
- Tall in the Saddle (1944) as Sheriff Jackson
- Heavenly Days (1944) as Detective (uncredited)
- The Falcon in Hollywood (1944) as Inspector McBride
- What a Blonde (1945) as McPherson, A1 Plumbing / Ration Board (uncredited)
- The Crime Doctor's Courage (1945) as Police Captain Birch
- Having Wonderful Crime (1945) as Desk Sergeant (uncredited)
- Two O'Clock Courage (1945) as Insp. Bill Brenner
- It's in the Bag! (1945) as Mr. Buddoo (uncredited)
- Zombies on Broadway (1945) as Ship's Captain (uncredited)
- Radio Stars on Parade (1945) as Chief Inspector (uncredited)
- Mama Loves Papa (1945) as O'Leary
- State Fair (1945) as Congressman James A. Goodheart (uncredited)
- Sing Your Way Home (1945) as Ship's Captain
- Colonel Effingham's Raid (1946) as Joe Alsobrook
- Deadline at Dawn (1946) as Captain Bender (uncredited)
- Riverboat Rhythm (1946) as Sheriff Martin
- The Falcon's Alibi (1946) as Metcaf
- Badman's Territory (1946) as Bitter Creek (uncredited)
- Strange Triangle (1946) as Barney Shaefer
- Deadline for Murder (1946) as Masseur
- Queen of Burlesque (1946) as Police Insp. Tom Crowley
- Gallant Journey (1946) as Car Driver (uncredited)
- Little Iodine (1946) as Mr. Bigdome
- The Show-Off (1946) as Mr. Appelton
- Abie's Irish Rose (1946) as Father John Whalen
- Calendar Girl (1947) as The Mayor
- Suddenly, It's Spring (1947) as Elevator Passenger (uncredited)
- The Guilt of Janet Ames (1947) as Susie's Father (uncredited)
- Violence (1947) as True Dawson
- Gas House Kids Go West (1947) as Police Sgt. Casey
- Stork Bites Man (1947) as Alan Kimberly
- The Crime Doctor's Gamble (1947) as O'Reilly
- Summer Holiday (1948) as Dannville Beach Club Bartender (uncredited)
- Here Comes Trouble (1948) as Winfield 'Windy' Blake
- Song of Idaho (1948) as J. Chester Nottingham
- Mr. Blandings Builds His Dream House (1948) as Mr. PeDelford
- Assigned to Danger (1948) as Sheriff (uncredited)
- Blonde Ice (1948) as Police Capt. Bill Murdock
- The Babe Ruth Story (1948) as Saloon Keeper (scenes deleted)
- You Gotta Stay Happy (1948) as Bank Watchman
- Strike It Rich (1948) as Carlton
- Disaster (1948) as Father Mulvaney (uncredited)
- Words and Music (1948) as Mr. Feiner
- Rose of the Yukon (1949) as Tim McNab
- A Woman's Secret (1949) as Desk Sergeant
- Alaska Patrol (1949) as Capt. Jan Robart
- Hideout (1949) as Arnie Anderson
- Ma and Pa Kettle (1949) as Bill Reed
- The Beautiful Blonde from Bashful Bend (1949) as Mr. Hingleman
- Hellfire (1949) as Sheriff Duffy
- Massacre River (1949) as Sgt. Johanssen
- Unmasked (1950) as 'Pop' Swenson
- Key to the City (1950) as Council Chairman
- Beware of Blondie (1950) as Herb Woodley
- Rock Island Trail (1950) as Senator Wells
- Kill the Umpire (1950) as Schultz - Home Plate Umpire (uncredited)
- County Fair (1950) as Tim Brennan
- Chain Gang (1950) as Capt. Duncan
- To Please a Lady (1950) as Mr. Wendall
- Trail of Robin Hood (1950) as J. Corwin Aldridge
- Grounds for Marriage (1951) Cop taking Ina Back to Apartment (uncredited)
- Belle Le Grand (1951) as Marshal at Concert (uncredited)
- My True Story (1951) as Ed Praskins
- The Lemon Drop Kid (1951) as Man bumped into on street (uncredited)
- The Redhead and the Cowboy (1951) as Northern Sympathizer Barfly (uncredited)
- Ma and Pa Kettle Back on the Farm (1951) as Billy Reed
- Two of a Kind (1951) as First Deputy (uncredited)
- Show Boat (1951) as Jake Green, the Trocadero nightclub manager (uncredited)
- Let's Go Navy! (1951) as Police Sgt. Mulloy
- All That I Have (1951) as Juror Barstow
- Honeychile (1951) as Mayor
- Golden Girl (1951) as McGuire (uncredited)
- Boots Malone (1952) as Evans (uncredited)
- Rancho Notorious (1952) as Sheriff #2
- Oklahoma Annie (1952) as Judge Byrnes
- The Fabulous Senorita (1952) as Dean Bradshaw
- Macao (1952) as Ship's Captain (uncredited)
- Gobs and Gals (1952) as Senator Prentice
- When in Rome (1952) as Ship's Captain
- And Now Tomorrow (1952)
- The Girl in White (1952) as Yardman (uncredited)
- Has Anybody Seen My Gal (1952) as Policeman Clancy (uncredited)
- Washington Story (1952) as Howard - INS Chief (uncredited)
- Ma and Pa Kettle at the Fair (1952) as Billy Reed
- Dreamboat (1952) as Used Car Salesman 'Crazy Sam' (uncredited)
- Lost in Alaska (1952) as Sherman
- The Lawless Breed (1953) as Bartender (uncredited)
- Confidentially Connie (1953) as Mr. Daveney (uncredited)
- Call Me Madam (1953) as Sen. Charlie Gallagher
- Fort Vengeance (1953) as Patrick Fitzgibbon
- The Girl Who Had Everything (1953) as Horse Auctioneer (uncredited)
- Safari Drums (1953) as Larry Conrad
- The Band Wagon (1953) as Man on Train (uncredited)
- Sweethearts on Parade (1953) as Mayor
- Here Come the Girls (1953) as Police Chief Garrity (uncredited)
- Shadows of Tombstone (1953) as Sheriff Webb (uncredited)
- Easy to Love (1953) as Mr. Huffnagel (uncredited)
- So You Want to Learn to Dance (1953) as George Bilvens
- The Long, Long Trailer (1954) as Policeman (uncredited)
- The Battle of Rogue River (1954) as Sgt. McClain
- Ma and Pa Kettle at Home (1954) as Billy Reed
- The Rocket Man (1954) as Big Bill Watkins
- Pride of the Blue Grass (1954) as Mr. Casey
- Sabrina (1954) as Charles - Butler (uncredited)
- Jungle Gents (1954) as Police Capt. Daly (uncredited)
- The Looters (1955) as Joe Sr.
- The Road to Denver (1955) as Mr. Murdock (uncredited)
- You're Never Too Young (1955) as Train Conductor (uncredited)
- How to Be Very, Very Popular (1955) as Chief of Police
- Artists and Models (1955) as Mr. Kelly (uncredited)
- That Certain Feeling (1956) as Senator (uncredited)
- Pardners (1956) as Col. Hart (uncredited)
- The Young Guns (1956) as Padgett (uncredited)
- Hot Shots (1956) as B. L. Taylor (uncredited)
- The Delicate Delinquent (1957) as Sgt. Levitch (uncredited)
- The Notorious Mr. Monks (1958) as Sheriff Cobus Anders
- Man of the West (1958) as Henry (uncredited)
- The Hot Angel (1958) as Judd Pfeifer
- Alias Jesse James (1959) as Angel's Rest Sheriff (uncredited)
- This Earth Is Mine (1959) as Berke (uncredited)
- A Hole in the Head (1959) as Sheriff (uncredited)
- Ada (1961) as Security Guard (uncredited)
- The Two Little Bears (1961) as Grimshaw Wilkes
- The Bounty Killer (1965) as Sam - Bartender
- Git! (1965) as T. C. Knox
- Changes (1969) as Man Seated at Lunchcounter (uncredited)
- The Andromeda Strain (1971) as Pete 'Old Doughboy' Arnold (uncredited)
- Girls on the Road (1972) as Bartender (final film role)
