= Esther Dale =

American actress (1885–1961)

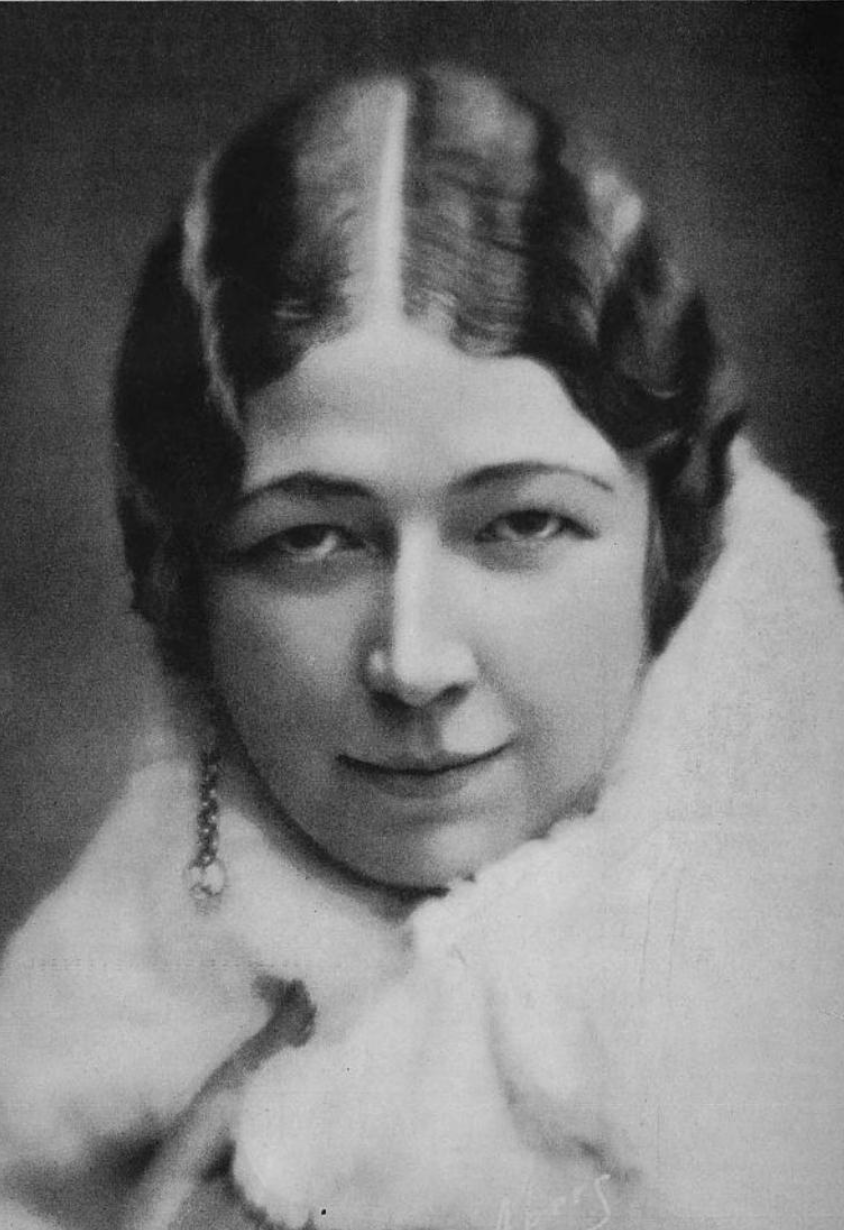
- Esther Dale, from a 1926 publication
- Born: November 10, 1885; Beaufort, South Carolina, U.S.
- Died: July 23, 1961 (aged 75); Queen of Angels Hospital, Hollywood, California, U.S.
- Occupations: Actress, singer
- Years active: 1932–1961
- Spouse(s): Arthur J. Beckhard (m. 1922; died 1961)

Esther Dale (November 10, 1885 – July 23, 1961) was an American actress of the stage and screen.

== Early life and education ==
Dale was born in Beaufort, South Carolina. She attended Leland and Gray Seminary in Townshend, Vermont. In Berlin, Germany, she studied music and enjoyed a successful career as a singer of Lieder on the concert stage.

== Career ==
Dale was head of Smith College's vocal department until 1922 after having taught voice at Mount Holyoke College.

Her singing career included appearances with the New York Philharmonic and the Boston Symphony Orchestra. She sang in England for two months in 1930 and was invited back there for a long concert series. Her recordings were popular in England and Scotland.

In the U.S., Dale transferred to the acting stage and cultivated a career as an actress in Summer stock. She starred in Carrie Nation on Broadway in 1933. Her other Broadway credits include Harvest of Years (1947), And Be My Love (1944), and Another Language (1932).

Dale's first film was Crime Without Passion (1934) in an uncredited role. She played Birdie Hicks in the Ma and Pa Kettle films The Egg and I (1947), Ma and Pa Kettle (1949), Ma and Pa Kettle at the Fair (1952), and Ma and Pa Kettle at Waikiki (1955).

Dale played many roles in television over the years. In 1957, she appeared in the 1957 Maverick episode "According to Hoyle" opposite James Garner. That same year, she guest-starred in the TV Western series Wagon Train, playing Grandma Birch, in the episode "The Julie Gage Story". In the 1958-1959 season of The Donna Reed Show, Dale played a job-seeking housekeeper who is frightened from the Stone home by Jeff Stone's pet mouse. Dale played a ladylady, Mrs. Finch, in The Many Loves of Dobie Gillis episode "Live Alone and Like It".

== Personal life ==
Dale died in the summer of 1961 following surgery in Queen of Angels Hospital in Hollywood. Her husband, writer-director Arthur J. Beckhard, had died four months earlier.

== Partial filmography ==
- Crime Without Passion (1934) as Miss Keeley (uncredited)
- The Wedding Night (1935) as Mrs. Kaise Novak
- Private Worlds (1935) as Matron
- Curly Top (1935) as Aunt Genevieve Graham
- I Live My Life (1935) as Brumbaugh, Mrs. Gage's Housekeeper
- Mary Burns, Fugitive (1935) as Kate
- In Old Kentucky (1935) as Dolly Breckenridge
- I Dream Too Much (1935) as Mrs. Dilley (uncredited)
- The Great Impersonation (1935) as Mrs. Unthank
- Timothy's Quest (1936) as Hitty Tarbox
- Lady of Secrets (1936) as Miss Eccles
- The Farmer in the Dell (1936) as Louella 'Ma' Boyer
- The Case Against Mrs. Ames (1936) as Matilda
- Fury (1936) as Mrs. Whipple
- Hollywood Boulevard (1936) as Martha
- The Magnificent Brute (1936) as Mrs. Randolph (uncredited)
- Outcast (1937) as Hattie Simmerson
- Damaged Goods (1937) as Mrs. Dupont
- Easy Living (1937) as Lillian
- Wild Money (1937) as Jenny Hawkins
- Dead End (1937) as Mrs. Fenner
- On Such a Night (1937) as Miss Belinda Fentridge
- The Awful Truth (1937) as Mrs. Leeson
- Of Human Hearts (1938) as Mrs. Cantwell (uncredited)
- Condemned Women (1938) as Mrs. Clara Glover, Head Matron
- Stolen Heaven (1938) as Lieschen
- Prison Farm (1938) as Cora Waxley
- Girls on Probation (1938) as Nrs, Engstrom (uncredited)
- Dramatic School (1938) as Forewoman in Factory (uncredited)
- The Great Man Votes (1939) as Ms. Markham (uncredited)
- Made for Each Other (1939) as Annie, Cook #1 (uncredited)
- Sergeant Madden (1939) as Mrs. McGillivray (uncredited)
- Broadway Serenade (1939) as Mrs. Olsen
- Big Town Czar (1939) as Ma Daley
- Tell No Tales (1939) as Mrs. Haskins
- 6,000 Enemies (1939) as Matron
- The Women (1939) as Ingrid (uncredited)
- Blackmail (1939) as Sarah
- Bad Little Angel (1939) as Miss Brown, Orphanage Secretary (uncredited)
- A Child Is Born (1939) as Prison Matron (uncredited)
- Swanee River (1939) as Temperance Woman
- Laddie (1940) as Sarah, the Housekeeper
- Abe Lincoln in Illinois (1940) as Lincoln's Cook (uncredited)
- Village Barn Dance (1940) as Minerva Withers
- Convicted Woman (1940) as Chief Matron Brackett
- Women Without Names (1940) as Head Matron Ingles
- And One Was Beautiful (1940) as Margaret
- Forty Little Mothers (1940) as Mrs. Mason, Landlady (uncredited)
- Opened by Mistake (1940) as Mrs. Anthony DeBorest
- The Mortal Storm (1940) as Marta
- Untamed (1940) as Mrs. Smith
- Cross-Country Romance (1940) as Mrs. McGillicuddy (uncredited)
- Blondie Has Servant Trouble (1940) as Anna Vaughn
- Arise, My Love (1940) as Susie
- Mr. & Mrs. Smith (1941) as Mrs. Krausheimer
- Back Street (1941) as Mrs. Smith
- The Hard-Boiled Canary (1941) as Miss Clark
- Unfinished Business (1941) as Aunt Mathilda
- Aloma of the South Seas (1941) as Tarusa
- All-American Co-Ed (1941) as Aunt Matilda Collinge
- Dangerously They Live (1941) as Dawson
- Blondie Goes to College (1942) as Mrs. Carrie Dill, the Landlady (uncredited)
- What's Cookin'? (1942) as Mrs. Murphy (uncredited)
- You're Asking Me (1942) as Aunt Fannie Handley
- Ten Gentlemen from West Point (1942) as Mrs. Thompson
- Maisie Gets Her Man (1942) as Mrs. Myra McIntyre, Elsie's Mother (uncredited)
- I Married an Angel (1942) as Mrs. Gherkin (uncredited)
- Wrecking Crew (1942) as Mike O'Glendy
- The Amazing Mrs. Holliday (1943) as Lucy
- Hello, Frisco, Hello (1943) as Aunt Harriet (uncredited)
- Murder in Times Square (1943) as Longacre Lil
- Swing Your Partner (1943) as Caroline Bird, aka Anna Robbins
- The North Star (1943) as Anna Kurin
- Old Acquaintance (1943) as Harriet
- Out of This World (1945) as Abbie Pringle (uncredited)
- Bedside Manner (1945) as Martha Gravitt
- On Stage Everybody (1945) as Ma Cassidy
- Behind City Lights (1945) as Sarah Lowell
- My Reputation (1946) as Anna
- A Stolen Life (1946) as Mrs. Johnson
- Smoky (1946) as Mrs. 'Gram' Richards
- Margie (1946) as Grandma McSweeney
- The Egg and I (1947) as Birdie Hicks
- The Unfinished Dance (1947) as Olga
- A Song Is Born (1948) as Miss Bragg
- Ma and Pa Kettle (1949) as Mrs. Birdie Hicks
- Anna Lucasta (1949) as Mrs. Polaski (uncredited)
- Holiday Affair (1949) as Mrs. Ennis
- No Man of Her Own (1950) as Josie
- Surrender (1950) as Aunt May
- Walk Softly, Stranger (1950) as Miss Thompson
- On Moonlight Bay (1951) as Aunt Martha Robertson (uncredited)
- Too Young to Kiss (1951) as Mrs. Boykin
- Ma and Pa Kettle at the Fair (1952) as Birdie Hicks
- Monkey Business (1952) as Mrs. Rhinelander
- Ma and Pa Kettle at Waikiki (1955) as Birdie Hicks
- Betrayed Women (1955) as Head Matron Ballard
- The Oklahoman (1957) as Mrs. Fitzgerald
- The Sound and the Fury (1959) as Mrs. Maud Mansfield (uncredited)
- North to Alaska (1960) as Woman at Picnic (uncredited)
