= The Life of Riley (1949 film) =

American film

- Directed by: Irving Brecher
- Written by: Irving Brecher; Groucho Marx
- Produced by: Irving Brecher
- Starring: William Bendix; Rosemary DeCamp; James Gleason
- Cinematography: William H. Daniels
- Edited by: Milton Carruth
- Music by: Frank Skinner
- Production company: Brecher Productions
- Distributed by: Universal Pictures
- Release date: April 16, 1949
- Running time: 90 minutes
- Country: United States
- Language: English
- Box office: over $1.5 million

The Life of Riley is a 1949 American comedy film directed by Irving Brecher and starring William Bendix, Rosemary DeCamp and James Gleason. It was based on the popular radio show of the same title. The film was premiered in Cincinnati, Ohio on 5 March 1949.

== Plot ==
A well-meaning factory employee is struggling financially. His career gets a lift when he receives a promotion, but this causes resentment among his fellow workers who believe it is due to the fact his daughter is engaged to the factory owner's son.

== Cast ==
- William Bendix as Chester A. Riley
- Rosemary DeCamp as Peg Riley
- James Gleason as Gillis
- Bill Goodwin as Sidney Monahan
- Beulah Bondi as Miss Martha Bogle
- Meg Randall as Barbara "Babs" Riley
- Richard Long as Jeff Taylor
- Lanny Rees as Junior Riley
- Mark Daniels as Burt Stevenson
- Ted de Corsia as Norman
- John Brown as Digby "Digger" ODell
- Victoria Horne as Lucy Monahan
- William E. Green as Carl Stevenson

== Radio adaptation ==
William Bendix and Rosemary DeCamp reprised their roles in an hour-long radio adaptation of the film that was presented on Lux Radio Theatre on May 8, 1950.

== Bibliography ==
- Monaco, James (1991). The Encyclopedia of Film. New York, NY: Perigee Trade. ISBN 978-0-399-51604-7. OCLC 20894633.
