= Meg Randall =

American actress (1926–2018)

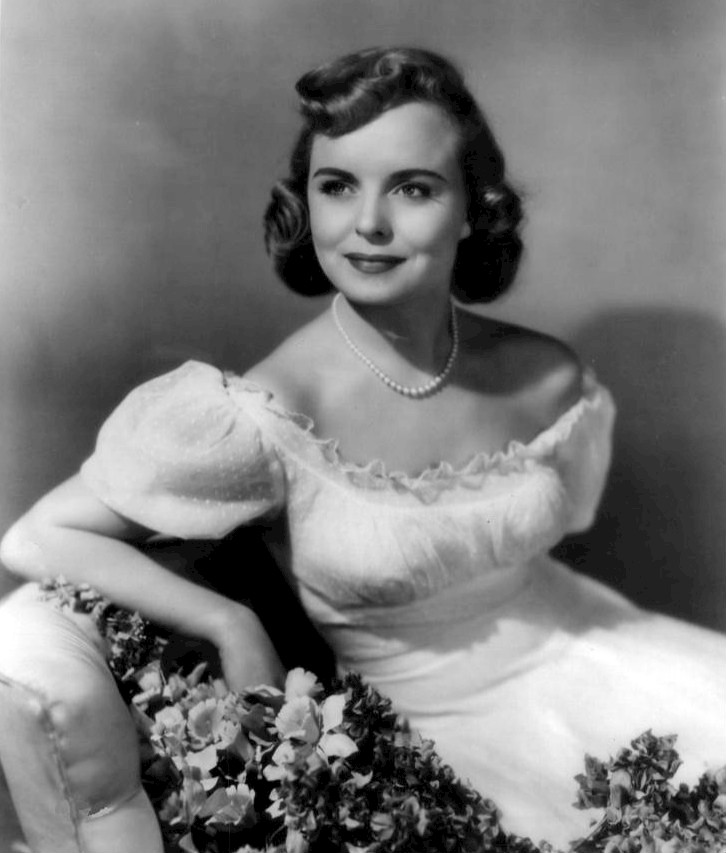
- Randall in 1950.
- Born: Genevieve Roberts; August 1, 1926; Clinton, Oklahoma, U.S.
- Died: July 20, 2018 (aged 91)
- Other names: Gene Roberts; Miss X
- Occupation: Actress
- Years active: 1946–1961
- Parent(s): Charles Patrick Roberts; Winnie McMillin

Meg Randall (born Genevieve Roberts; August 1, 1926 – July 20, 2018) was an American film actress. She was active in motion pictures, radio, and television between 1946 and 1961, changing her name from Gene Roberts to Meg Randall in mid-1948.

Randall was known for her portrayal of Babs Riley in the 1949 film version of the popular radio comedy The Life of Riley, as well as her recurring role as Kim Parker Kettle in the Ma & Pa Kettle comedy series from 1949 to 1951. Randall's first recognizable role was in the supporting cast for the 1949 film noir classic Criss Cross. In 1952, she returned to the film noir genre in the suspense story Without Warning. Randall died in July 2018 at the age of 91.

== Early life ==
Randall was born August 1, 1926, in Clinton, Custer and Washita County, Oklahoma. She was known informally as Gene, which was derived from her birth name, Genevieve. Randall's father, Charles Patrick Roberts (1892-1980), originated from Texas and by 1900, his family moved into Chickasaw Nation, Indian Territory, to farm while Charles was young. The family moved to Seminole, Seminole County, Oklahoma by 1930 where he worked as a garage mechanic then to Shawnee, Pottawatomie County, Oklahoma, where he worked as a construction laborer. The family lived in Shawnee until the start of World War II.

Randall's mother, Winnie McMillin (1899-1952), was born in Tennessee and grew up in an Oklahoma farming community as well. By the age of 20, Winnie was a school teacher in Harris Township, OK.

Randall was the third of five children. Her two older siblings were Juanita and Juarez and her younger siblings were Lahoma and Bobby Lea. Although her family is of primarily Welsh descent, her father favored names of alternate ethnicity selecting a few for his children rather than Welsh names, breaking away from family tradition.

During World War II, both of Gene's parents were employed as attendants at the Veterans' Administration Hospital in Muskogee, OK. Gene's older brother, Juarez Roberts, was a World War II paratrooper and a graduate from the University of Oklahoma after the war. He found his niche in Hollywood by writing for several television shows during the 1950s until the early 1960s.

== Career choice ==
Most of Randall's schooling was in the Shawnee public schools. The family moved to Muskogee in 1941 and in 1943 at the age of seventeen, Randall graduated from Muskogee High School. She enrolled in the University of Oklahoma School of Drama where she studied for one year.

After one year of college, Randall moved to Los Angeles with the goal of becoming a movie actress. Once in Los Angeles, Randall moved in with a college friend of her mother's. Randall acquired a talent agent who arranged interviews for her with both Mary Pickford, co-founder of United Artists, and Paramount.

Although Randall only had some school stage experience, including the lead in the play Claudia at the University of Oklahomas, Pickford offered Randall $125 a week, a considerable amount, to sign with United Artists. However, Paramount Studios came back with a better offer, which Randall was ready to accept. But another encounter would steer her away from the generous Paramount offer.

Gene's mother's friend was also an acquaintance of the alluring silent film star, Rubye De Remer, which gave Gene the opportunity to meet Rubye and make a marked impression on her as well. On Gene's behalf, Rubye in turn piqued the interest of director Clarence Brown. It was early 1945 when MGM and Clarence Brown first embarked on a nationwide casting search for some fresh talent for The Yearling And now months later, Clarence believed that perhaps the role of Orry Baxter might be suited for Gene. So Rubye contacted Gene the day after the Paramount offer was made and persuaded her to meet with Clarence at MGM that day. Despite the fact that MGM newcomer, Jacqueline White, was actually selected and had filmed some scenes that summer, Clarence was still not convinced that she was the right choice. As a result, Gene was called back three times to test for the role and eagerly awaited to hear from the studio each time. This experience earned her a $250 a week, long-term MGM contract which she signed as herself, Gene Roberts. Ultimately, Gene's youthfulness was the deciding factor that prevented MGM from assigning her this lead role. When production resumed in mid-September 1945, Clarence had chosen 28-year-old Jane Wyman, who was on loan from Warner Brothers, to portray a more mature-looking character with co-star Gregory Peck. The Yearling was released in May 1947 and went on to win multiple Academy Awards and nominations, including a Best Actress nomination for Jane Wyman.

Gene remained under contract with MGM for nearly two years and found that there were very few roles for young women her age at that time. It wasn't until late October 1946 and over a year since Gene first signed on, that she was cast in a small supporting role. This role placed Gene into the last of Ann Sothern's film series, the final episode entitled Undercover Maisie which was released in May 1947. Next, she was cast in the low-budget Comet Productions film Stork Bites Man where she co-starred with Jackie Cooper, who had resumed his acting career after returning from the war. With production completed in early February 1947 and MGM showing no serious interest in her by that spring, Gene asked for and was granted release from her contract. She then signed once more as herself, Gene Roberts, with 20th Century-Fox Film Corporation but was overlooked by the studio there as well. After a year had passed, Gene opted out of the 20th Century contract and was on the move again.

== Name change ==
In mid-June 1948, Universal-International brought Gene aboard with what would become a three-year contract. Once again, she had no idea if she would be offered any work there either. Surprisingly, just two days later, she was cast as Helen and filming on the set of Criss Cross with Burt Lancaster, Yvonne De Carlo and Dan Duryea. This became a significant event that inevitably changed her career potential and her name.

Prior to signing with Universal-International, Gene had married a studio musician named Robert Thorpe. It was the opinion of U-I producers that neither her birth name, Gene Roberts, nor her married name Gene Thorpe (also known as Jean Thorpe), was considered a good fit for her Hollywood identity. As a new U-I player, Gene was obliged to immediately select a screen name. Since this occurred during the production of Criss Cross, she was dubbed "Miss X" early on by the studio. The name Meg McClure was first chosen and announced in a press release along with her new image in a Hollywood fashioned pose set against a giant "X". However, this name was short-lived. Another young newcomer had already changed her name to M'Liss McClure and attracted gossip column interest with her protests about the competing last name. Overall, it was reported that the publicity over the name change drew six thousand letters into the studio offering name suggestions. Before filming ended on the movie, a new name was chosen and Gene would forever be publicly recognized by her screen name, Meg Randall.

== Filmography ==
Year	Title	Role	Notes
1947	Undercover Maisie	Manny	Alternative title: Kick!
1947	Stork Bites Man	Peg Brown	
1949	Ma and Pa Kettle	Kim Parker	Alternative title: The Further Adventures of Ma and Pa Kettle
1949	The Life of Riley	Barbara "Babs" Riley	
1949	Criss Cross	Helen	
1949	Abandoned	Dottie Jensen	Alternative titles: Abandoned Women and Not Wanted
1950	Ma and Pa Kettle Go to Town	Kim Parker Kettle	
1951	Ma and Pa Kettle Back on the Farm	Kim Parker Kettle	
1952	Without Warning!	Jane Saunders	
1957	Chain of Evidence	Polly Gunther	
1957	Last of the Badmen	Lila	
