= Stork Bites Man =

1947 film by Cy Endfield

- Original theatrical poster
- Directed by: Cy Endfield
- Screenplay by: Cy Endfield
- Produced by: Ralph Cohn; Mary Pickford; Charles 'Buddy' Rogers
- Starring: Jackie Cooper
- Cinematography: Vincent J. Farrar; Robert Pittack
- Edited by: Lynn Harrison
- Music by: Raoul Kraushaar
- Production company: Comet Productions
- Distributed by: United Artists
- Release date: June 21, 1947
- Running time: 67 minutes
- Country: United States
- Language: English

Stork Bites Man is a 1947 American comedy film directed by Cy Endfield. it was the last of five short features from Comet Productions, a company owned by Mary Pickford, her husband Charles "Buddy" Rogers and former Columbia executive Ralph Cohn.

== Plot ==
Ernie, an apartment manager gets fired and evicted when his boss, who hates kids, learns that Ernie's wife is pregnant. Taking advice from a mysterious, invisible stork, Ernie organizes an apartment workers' strike, which eventually forces his boss to soften up.

== Cast ==
- Jackie Cooper as Ernest (Ernie) C. Brown
- Meg Randall as Peg Brown (as Gene Roberts)
- Emory Parnell as Alan Kimberly
- Gus Schilling as Hubert Butterfield
- Sarah Selby as Mrs. Greene
- Scott Elliott as Jerry
- Marjorie Beckett as Mabel (as Marjory Beckett)
- Ralph Peters as Morgan
- Dave Willock as Lester
- Stanley Prager as Voice of the Invisible Stork

== Critical reception ==
- TV Guide called the film an "innocuous comedy".
- Allmovie called the film "only fitfully funny, 'Stork Bites Man' is brightened by the presence of veteran burlesque comedian Gus Schilling, making a meal of his role as a nursery-supply peddler."
