= Thicker than Water (1973 TV series) =

- Genre: Sitcom
- Based on: Nearest and Dearest
- Directed by: Jerry Paris
- Starring: Julie Harris; Richard Long
- Country of origin: United States
- Original language: English
- No. of seasons: 1
- No. of episodes: 9

Production
- Producer: Bob Banner
- Production company: Bob Banner Associates

Original release
- Network: ABC
- Release: June 13 – August 8, 1973

Thicker than Water is an American sitcom that aired on ABC, and was based on the British sitcom Nearest and Dearest. Eight episodes were originally ordered to be shown as a summer series, with tentative plans for eight more scripts to be prepared, if the series became popular. The series ran on Wednesdays 8:00 p.m. to 8:30 p.m. from June 13 until August 8, 1973, a total of nine episodes.

Beryl Vertue, who had found success turning British TV series into popular American series (Till Death Us Do Part was the basis for All In the Family and Steptoe and Son became Sanford and Son) hoped to have similar luck turning Nearest and Dearest into a popular American series.

== Synopsis ==
Sensible Nellie Paine and her womanizing brother Ernie were promised $75,000 each if they moved back home to live with their elderly father Jonas and run the family business, Paine's Pure Pickles, for five years. The only thing the siblings have in common is they both hate pickles. Their father shows no signs of dying soon, and enjoys seeing his grown children bickering.

== Cast ==
- Richard Long as Ernie Paine
- Julie Harris as Nellie Paine
- Malcolm Atterbury as Jonas Paine
- Jessica Myerson as Lily (a cousin)
- Lou Fant as Walter (Lily's husband)

== Episodes ==
| No. | Title | Original release date |
|---|---|---|
| 1 | "2 for the Money" | June 13, 1973 |
Siblings, estranged for 8 years, will inherit their fathers business “Paine's Pure Pickles" plus $75,000 apiece, when their father dies, if they both run the business together for 5 years.
| 2 | "In a Pickle" | June 20, 1973 |
Nellie regrets entrusting the pickle factory payroll to Ernie.
| 3 | "The Piano Teacher" | June 27, 1973 |
Nellie is willing to give up her inheritance to run off with the man of her dreams, but her brother and father have other ideas about what she should do.
| 4 | "The Odd Father" | July 4, 1973 |
Nellie and Ernie can't figure out why Bert, the factory foreman, keeps trying to sneak into their house.
| 5 | "The Jerk Who Came to Dinner" | July 11, 1973 |
Nellie tries to get rid of an unwanted house guest, Ernie's old army pal.
| 6 | "A Majority of None" | July 18, 1973 |
When Jonas' doctor says he must stop working Nellie and Ernie both try to become president of the pickle factory.
| 7 | "The Return of Jake Paine" | July 25, 1973 |
Nellie and Ernie worry about their inheritance when Jonas' con artist brother Jake comes for a visit
| 8 | "Save This Kid" | August 1, 1973 |
Nellie wants to bring charges against the youth who stole her car, but Ernie wants the boy to be given a second chance.
| 9 | "The Mourning After" | August 8, 1973 |
Ernie is pressured into staying with Jonas so that Nellie can go on a blind date with Walter's friend.
