= Fury at Gunsight Pass =

1956 film by Fred F. Sears

- Directed by: Fred F. Sears
- Screenplay by: David Lang
- Story by: David Lang
- Produced by: Wallace MacDonald
- Starring: David Brian; Neville Brand; Richard Long
- Cinematography: Fred Jackman, Jr.
- Edited by: Saul A. Goodkind
- Production company: Columbia Pictures
- Distributed by: Columbia Pictures
- Release date: February 15, 1956
- Running time: 67 minutes
- Country: United States
- Language: English

Fury at Gunsight Pass is a 1956 American Western film directed by Fred F. Sears and starring David Brian, Neville Brand and Richard Long. It was produced and distributed by Columbia Pictures.

== Plot ==
Bank robbers hold townspeople hostage, threatening to kill one of them every thirty minutes until $35,000 from an earlier robbery, hidden by a deceased accomplice, is found.

== Cast ==
- David Brian as Whitney Turner
- Neville Brand as Dirk Hogan
- Richard Long as Roy Hanford
- Lisa Davis as Kathy Phillips
- Katharine Warren as Mrs. Boggs
- Percy Helton as Peter Boggs
- Morris Ankrum as Doc Phillips
- Addison Richards as Charles Hanford
- Joe Forte as Andrew Ferguson
- Wally Vernon as Okay, Okay
- Paul E. Burns as Squint
- Frank Fenton as Sheriff Meeker
- George Keymas as Daley
- Robert Anderson as Sam Morris
- Guy Teague as Hammond
