= West of El Dorado =

1949 film by Ray Taylor

- Theatrical release poster
- Directed by: Ray Taylor
- Screenplay by: Adele Buffington
- Produced by: Barney Sarecky
- Starring: Johnny Mack Brown; Max Terhune; Reno Browne; Teddy Infuhr; Milburn Morante; Terry Frost
- Cinematography: Harry Neumann
- Edited by: John C. Fuller
- Production company: Monogram Pictures
- Distributed by: Monogram Pictures
- Release date: June 5, 1949
- Running time: 58 minutes
- Country: United States
- Language: English

West of El Dorado is a 1949 American Western film directed by Ray Taylor and written by Adele Buffington. The film stars Johnny Mack Brown, Max Terhune, Reno Browne, Teddy Infuhr, Milburn Morante and Terry Frost. The film was released on June 5, 1949, by Monogram Pictures.

== Cast ==
- Johnny Mack Brown as Johnny Mack
- Max Terhune as Alibi
- Reno Browne as Mary
- Teddy Infuhr as Larry Dallas
- Milburn Morante as Brimstone
- Terry Frost as Ed Stone
- Marshall Reed as Barstow
- Boyd Stockman as Joe
- Kenne Duncan as Steve Dallas
- Bud Osborne as Jerry
- William Bailey as Sheriff Jack
- Artie Ortego as Indian
- Bill Potter as Guitar Player Phil
