= Ma and Pa Kettle at the Fair =

1952 American film by Charles Barton

- Theatrical release poster
- Directed by: Charles Barton
- Screenplay by: Richard Morris; John Grant
- Story by: Martin Ragaway; Leonard Stern; Jack Henley
- Based on: The Egg and I by Betty MacDonald
- Produced by: Leonard Goldstein
- Starring: Marjorie Main and Percy Kilbride
- Cinematography: Maury Gertsman
- Edited by: Ted J. Kent
- Music by: Joseph Gershenson
- Production company: Universal Pictures
- Distributed by: Universal Pictures
- Release date: July 11, 1952
- Running time: 78 minutes
- Country: United States
- Language: English
- Box office: $2,500,000 (U.S. rentals)

Ma and Pa Kettle at the Fair is a 1952 American comedy film directed by Charles Barton and starring Marjorie Main and Percy Kilbride. It is the fourth installment of Universal-International's Ma and Pa Kettle film series.

== Plot ==
Ma and Pa Kettle are trying to raise money to send their daughter Rosie to college, although they are unemployed and in debt. Pa deliberately walks into street traffic, hoping to win a monetary injury settlement, but instead causes a collision. Ma wants to participate in contests at the county fair, and Pa buys an old tired horse named Emma on credit to compete in the harness race, promising to pay the owner later with Ma's prize money.

== Cast ==
- Marjorie Main as Ma Kettle
- Percy Kilbride as Pa Kettle
- Lori Nelson as Rosie Kettle
- James Best as Marvin Johnson
- Esther Dale as Birdie Hicks
- Emory Parnell as Billy Reed
- Russell Simpson as Clem Johnson
- Rex Lease as Sheriff

== See also ==
- List of films about horses
