= Leonard Goldstein =

American film producer

- Born: May 28, 1903; Bisbee, Arizona Territory, United States
- Died: July 23, 1954 (aged 51); Los Angeles, California, United States
- Occupation: Producer
- Years active: 1936–1954 (film)

Leonard Goldstein (May 28, 1903 – July 23, 1954) was an American film producer who produced mainly low-budget films, making multiple films at a time.

Arthur Lubin called him "a doll to work with. I don't think he knew too much about production and he listened to his directors."

== Biography ==
He started as a theatre booking agent in Los Angeles and moved to New York in 1928. He joined Consolidated Film Industries from 1933 to 1936 before going to work for producer George Hirliman.

His first film credit was as associate producer on Daniel Boone for RKO Pictures and his first as producer was Black Bart in 1948.

In 1946, he moved to International Pictures which later merged with Universal Pictures. He produced the first six films in the successful Ma and Pa Kettle film series, although Ma and Pa Kettle at Waikiki, made in 1952, was the seventh to be released, in 1955, after he had died. He also produced several of the Francis the Talking Mule films.

He spent nearly five years at Universal-International before moving to 20th-Century Fox in 1952 where he formed Panoramic Pictures in 1953. He had just signed a deal with United Artists to produce 10 films before he died.

== Death ==
He died from a cerebral haemorrhage on July 23, 1954.

== Selected filmography ==
- Daniel Boone (1936)
- Black Bart (1948)
- Larceny (1948)
- Calamity Jane and Sam Bass (1949)
- Ma and Pa Kettle (1949)
- I Was a Shoplifter (1950)
- Ma and Pa Kettle Go to Town (1950)
- Saddle Tramp (1950)
- The Sleeping City (1950)
- Francis Goes to the Races (1951)
- Katie Did It (1951)
- Ma and Pa Kettle Back on the Farm (1951)
- Flame of Araby (1951)
- Francis Goes to West Point (1952)
- Just Across the Street (1952)
- Ma and Pa Kettle at the Fair (1952)
- Sally and Saint Anne (1952)
- Steel Town (1952)
- The Redhead from Wyoming (1953)
- It Happens Every Thursday (1953)
- Francis Covers the Big Town (1953)
- The Kid from Left Field (1953)
- Ma and Pa Kettle on Vacation (1953)
- Mister Scoutmaster (1953)
- Vicki (1953)
- The Rocket Man (1954)
- The Gambler from Natchez (1954)
- Ma and Pa Kettle at Waikiki (1955)
- Day of the Nightmare (1965)

== Bibliography ==
- Vogel, Michelle. Marjorie Main: The Life and Films of Hollywood's "Ma Kettle". McFarland, 2011.
