= Patricia Kirkland =

American actress (1925–2000)

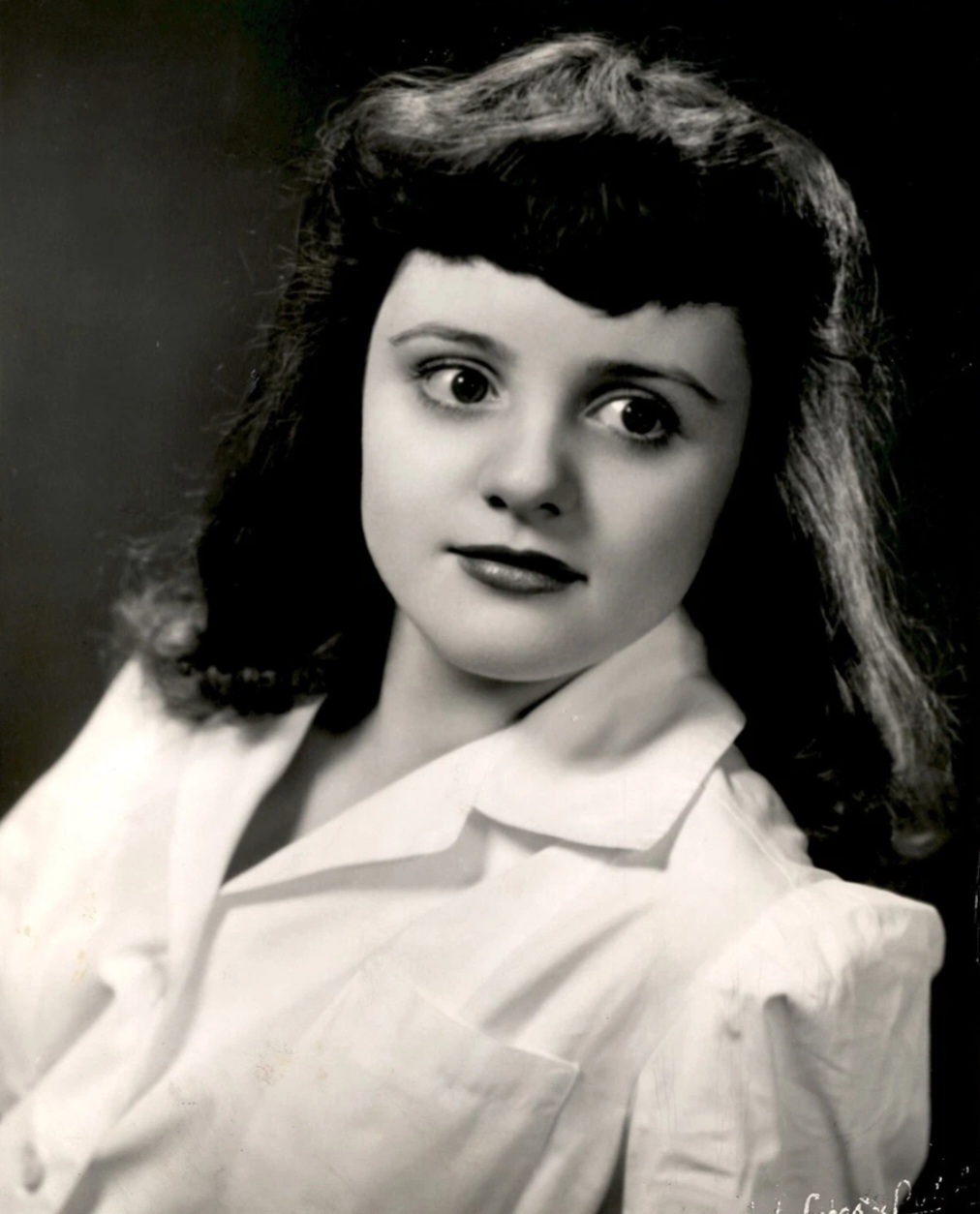
- Kirkland in 1944
- Born: July 18, 1925; New York City, U. S.
- Died: August 14, 2000 (aged 75); Los Angeles, California, U. S.
- Occupation: Actress
- Spouse: Donald Bevan (m. 1948)
- Children: 4
- Parent(s): Jack Kirkland; Nancy Carroll

Patricia Kirkland (July 18, 1925 – August 14, 2000) was an American actress.

== Early years ==
Kirkland was born on July 18, 1925, in New York City, the daughter of playwright Jack Kirkland and actress Nancy Carroll. As a child, she primarily lived in Hollywood, but she moved frequently with her family "between the Coast, New York and a farm in Pennsylvania." Kirkland had not planned to be an actress. She said: "It just happened. Someone offered me a job in a show when I was 17, and I took it." She did not study acting but said, "I learned what I know the hard way — as I went along." She also studied French, Spanish, dancing and singing, but she decided, "I can't really sing."

== Career ==
Before Kirkland finished high school, she acted in the play Susan and God at the Bucks County Playhouse in Pennsylvania, and while she was a senior she portrayed the title character on the Meet Corliss Archer radio series prior to its moving to the West Coast.

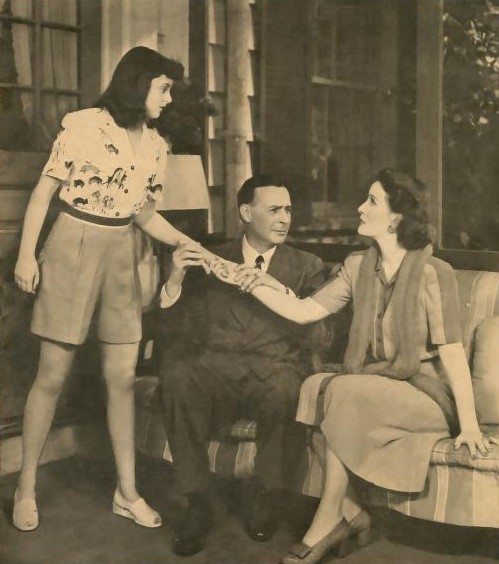
Kirkland, Clay Clement, and Katherine Warren in Kiss and Tell in Chicago (publicity still cropped from Stagebill cover)

Kirkland's stage debut came in a production of Susan and God in Philadelphia when she was 17 years old. After she graduated from high school, she again portrayed Archer, this time in the Chicago company of Kiss and Tell, which became the top box-office attraction in that city. Associated Press writer John S. Robling commented, "Her performance has the explosive quality of a star shell." When Kirkland was 18, columnist Alice Hughes described her as "the belle of the new bunch" of actors and actresses in summer stock theater. Kirkland was portraying the 15-year-old daughter of divorced parents in For Keeps, a role that she "attacks with skill and good will".

During the summer of 1946, Kirkland acted as part of Helen Hayes's company in Alice Sit-by-the-Fire. After Ruth Gordon saw her in that capacity, she signed Kirkland to play the young Ruth Gordon in Years Ago. Kirkland's Broadway performance in that role led a reviewer to write in The Sydney Morning Herald, "Young Miss Kirkland brought a delightful spirit of freshness and anxious youthful questing to this undistinguished comedy of a young girl's ambition to go on the stage." Kirkland's other Broadway credits include For Keeps (1944), Snafu (1944), Round Trip (1945), You Never Can Tell (1948), Magdalena (1948), and The Young and Fair (1948).

Kirkland was named Favorite TV Daytime Serial Actress in the Radio-TV Mirror Awards for 1951-52. Television programs on which she performed included Ford Theatre, TV Soundstage, Suspense and The Egg and I.

After Kirkland stopped acting, she became an agent, and in 1971 she became casting director at CBS.

== Mary MacArthur Memorial Committee ==
Kirkland and actress Bethel Leslie co-chaired the Mary MacArthur Memorial Committee, which raised funds for research and treatment of respiratory polio. Mary MacArthur, the daughter of Charles MacArthur and Helen Hayes, was an actress who died of respiratory polio in September 1949. The Mary MacArthur Memorial Fund was administered by the National Foundation for Infantile Paralysis. The fund's first project was a respirator research center that was added to the Children's Medical Center in Boston. The research center was dedicated by Hayes on November 19, 1950. Researchers there tested various mechanisms to see whether they could help patients leave iron lungs for any length of time. By January 1952, funds collected from people in the theatrical community exceeded $100,000, and additional research centers had been started in Ann Arbor, Houston, and Los Angeles.

== Personal life and death ==
Kirkland married Donald Bevan, an artist and a playwright, in November 1948. They kept their marriage secret for several months "because of the housing shortage and their plotting to get an apartment." Each of them roomed with a friend until Bevan's roommate moved out. They had four children. She died on August 14, 2000, in Los Angeles, California.
