= Ma and Pa Kettle =

Fictional characters

- First appearance: The Egg and I (book); The Egg and I (film)
- Created by: Betty MacDonald
- Portrayed by: Marjorie Main (as Ma); Percy Kilbride (as Pa)

In-universe information
- Films: Ma and Pa Kettle; Ma and Pa Kettle Go to Town; Ma and Pa Kettle Back on the Farm; Ma and Pa Kettle at the Fair; Ma and Pa Kettle on Vacation; Ma and Pa Kettle at Home; Ma and Pa Kettle at Waikiki; The Kettles in the Ozarks; The Kettles on Old MacDonald's Farm

Ma and Pa Kettle are comic film characters of the successful film series of the same name, produced by Universal Studios in the late 1940s and 1950s. “The hillbilly duo have their hands full with a ramshackle farm and a brood of rambunctious children. When the future comes a-callin' in the form of modern houses, exotic locales, and newfangled ideas, Ma and Pa must learn how to make the best of it with luck, pluck, and a little country charm.”

Originally based on real-life farming neighbors in Washington state, United States, Ma and Pa Kettle were composite characters created by Betty MacDonald in whose 1945 best-selling, semi-fictional memoir, The Egg and I, they appeared. The success of the book spawned the 1947 film The Egg and I starring Claudette Colbert and Fred MacMurray, also co-starring Marjorie Main and Percy Kilbride as Ma and Pa Kettle. Main was nominated for an Academy Award for Best Supporting Actress for her role.

After the audiences' positive reaction to the Kettles in the film, Universal Studios produced nine more films, with Marjorie Main reprising her role in all and Percy Kilbride reprising his in seven. The films grossed an estimated $35 million altogether at the box office and are said to have saved Universal from bankruptcy.

== Premise ==
- Phoebe "Ma" Kettle (played by Marjorie Main in all 10 films) is a raucous, hardworking country woman with a robust figure. She is smarter than Pa, but not by much, and can easily be fooled. (In the book, she is earthier and more profane. When she was a newly immigrated Baltic teenager, she married Pa under the impression that since he owned a farm, he was a solid prospect.) Ma is content with her role as mother to 15 rambunctious, mischievous children on their ramshackle farm in rural Cape Flattery, Washington. Because she has so many children, Ma sometimes gets their names confused. A misspelled sign "Be-ware of childrun" is posted in front of the farmhouse to warn unwanted visitors of hurled rocks, projectiles from slingshots and pea shooters, and other missiles launched by the rowdy and unpredictable Kettle brood.
- Franklin "Pa" Kettle (played by Percy Kilbride in the first eight films and by Parker Fennelly in the last film) is a gentle, slow-speaking, slow-thinking, and lazy man. His only talents appear to be avoiding work and winning contests. In the first film of the spin-off series, the family moves into a modern home with numerous electronic gadgets won by Pa in a tobacco slogan-writing contest. As the series continued, various reasons were devised to have the family relocate to the "old place," sometimes for extended periods of time. Much of the comedy is cornball humor arising from preposterous situations, such as Pa masquerading as a wealthy industrialist ("P.A. Kettle" in Ma and Pa Kettle at Waikiki, 1955) or being jailed after he accidentally causes racehorses to eat feed laced with concrete (Ma and Pa Kettle at the Fair, 1952). He has a younger brother, Sedgewick Kettle (played by Arthur Hunnicutt in the ninth film), who owns their parents' farm in Mournful Hollow, Arkansas.

== Recurring characters in the series ==
- Thomas "Tom" Kettle is the eldest of the Kettle children and is portrayed by Richard Long in the first four films. Tom works hard and goes to college at Washington State University, studying animal husbandry. He designs an improved chicken incubator. He meets his future wife, Kim, on a train ride back to Cape Flattery, but due to work issues, the two relocate to New York City.
- Kimberly "Kim" Kettle (née Parker) is married to Tom Kettle and is portrayed by Meg Randall in three films. She was the reporter for a popular Seattle magazine and came to Cape Flattery to write a series of articles on the Kettles and their new model home. Kim is very fond of the Kettles.
- Birdie Hicks is the Kettles' aging, cantankerous archenemy and is portrayed by Esther Dale in four films. She usually rides around in either her Model T car or her horse-drawn buggy with her elderly mother, lamenting Pa's laziness and the family's lack of organization. Birdie frequently competes with Ma whenever there is a quilting or jam contest at the county fair. In a rare act of kindness, she gives Ma and Pa the prize money she won at a horse race so Rosie can go to college. Apparently, her mother, Mrs. Hicks or Mother Hicks (played by Isabel O'Madigan in two films and by Hallene Hill in one), sympathizes with the Kettles.
- Billy Reed is the town's local merchant, portrayed by Billy House in the first film (1947), and then by Emory Parnell in four films (1949–1954). While he's a traveling salesman in The Egg and I, by the later Kettle movies, Billy has a general store in downtown Cape Flattery where his motto is written: "If there's anything you need, just come in and see Billy Reed." He often stops at the Kettle place to visit or deliver merchandise.
- Rosie Kettle is the Kettles' second-eldest daughter portrayed by Gloria Moore in one and Lori Nelson in two films. She desires to go to Sheraton College, but is unable to do so because of the family's economic instability. She is later learned to be working in Seattle. Rosie travels to Waikiki with Ma and Pa to help with cousin Rodney's pineapple enterprise.
- Jonathan and Elizabeth Parker are Kim Kettle's parents portrayed by Ray Collins and Barbara Brown in two films. They travel from Boston to see Tom and Kim's newborn baby in the fourth film. Elizabeth does not get along with the Kettles at first, but over time, realizes her mistake; Jonathan enjoys being with them from the start. The Parkers invite Ma and Pa to a trip to Paris in the sixth film.
- Geoduck (Oliver Blake) and Crowbar (Teddy Hart or Stan Ross) are Pa's Native American friends and usually act as his handymen, doing various tasks around the house under Pa's "supervision." Geoduck, pronounced "jaw-duck" in The Egg and I and then standardized as "gear-duck", is the chief of their tribe.

== Kettle Kids ==
Ma and Pa Kettle and Ma and Pa Kettle Go to Town mention 15 kids (including Thomas and Rosie above), although inconsistency arises in the names

Name	The Egg and I	Ma and Pa Kettle	Ma and Pa Kettle Go to Town	Ma and Pa Kettle Back on the Farm	Ma and Pa Kettle at the Fair	Ma and Pa Kettle on Vacation	Ma and Pa Kettle at Home	Ma and Pa Kettle at Waikiki	The Kettles in the Ozarks	The Kettles on Old MacDonald's Farm
Albert Kettle	Teddy Infuhr									
Benjamin Kettle		Teddy Infuhr				Jon Gardner	Donald MacDonald	Jon Gardner		
Betty Kettle							Judy Nugent			
Billy Kettle		Robin Winans	J.P. Sloane		Gary Lee Jackson		Richard Eyer	Rudy Lee	Richard Eyer	
Danny Kettle		Dale Belding			Ronnie Rondell Jr. (as Dannie)		Tony Epper (as Donny)	Ronnie Rondell Jr. (as Donnie)		
Elwin Kettle							Brett Halsey			
Eve Kettle		Beverly Mook			Beverly Mook		Coral Hammond	Beverly Mook		
George Kettle		Paul Dunn			Billy Clark		Gary Pagett	Billy Clark		
Henry Kettle		George McDonald	Jackie Jackson		Jackie Jackson		Whitey Haupt	Jackie Jackson		George Arglen
Kettle Boy					Billy Gray					
Kettle Child	Diane Florentine									
Kettle Child	Diane Graeff									
Kettle Child	Eugene Persson									
Kettle Child	George McDonald									
Kettle Child	Gloria Moore									
Kettle Child	Judith Bryant									
Kettle Child	Kathleen Mackey									
Kettle Child	Robert Beyers									
Kettle Child	Robert Winans									
Nancy Kettle		Elana Schreiner			Elana Schreiner		Carol Nugent	Elana Schreiner	Olive Sturgess	
Rosie Kettle		Gloria Moore			Lori Nelson			Lori Nelson		
Ruthie Kettle		Margaret Brown			Margaret Brown (as Ruth)	Margaret Brown	Donna Cregan Moots	Margaret Brown		
Sally Kettle		Donna Leary			Donna Leary			Donna Leary		
Sara Kettle		Diane Florentine			Jenny Linder		Nancy Zane	Jenny Linder		
Susie Kettle		Melinda Casey	Sherry Jackson				Patricia Morrow	Bonnie Kay Eddy	Cheryl Callaway	
Teddy Kettle		Eugene Persson (as Ted)			Eugene Persson	Mark Roberts	Patrick Miller	Timmy Hawkins		
Willie Kettle		George Arglen	Eugene Persson		George Arglen			George Arglen		

== Animals on the Kettles' farm ==
Bossie is the Kettles' red and white milk cow, which provides Ma, Pa, and their family with plenty of milk. Most of the time, the older Kettle boys or even Pa's Indian friends, Geoduck and Crowbar, milk her. In "Ma and Pa Kettle Go to Town" (1950), Pa is seen milking Bossie while listening to the music playing on the radio.

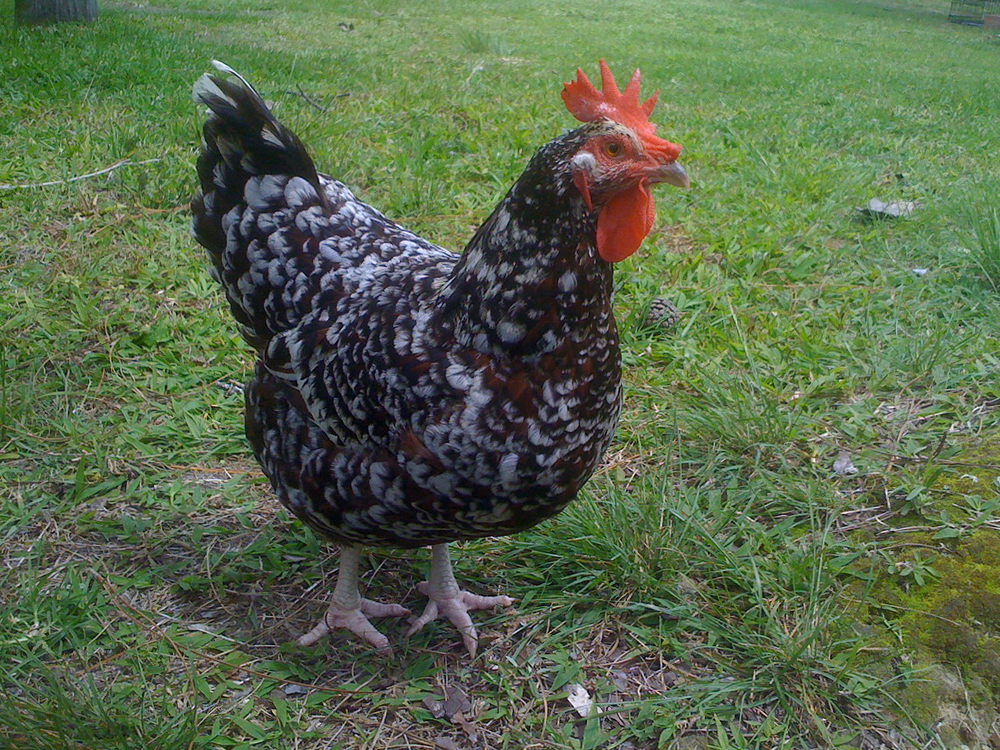
Speckled Sussex hen.

The chickens are a flock of nearly 100 chickens kept by the Kettles on their broken-down farm, which provide them with many eggs each day. Sometimes, one or two of the hens cause mischief towards the Kettles or other characters in the films. In Ma and Pa Kettle at Home (1954), Ma Kettle's prized speckled hen is seen a few times laying eggs on Mannering's head or in his bowler hat.

Pa Kettle's team includes an old, retired trotting horse, named Emma, and a white donkey wearing a straw hat, which together pull Pa's wagon around the county. In Ma and Pa Kettle at the Fair (1952), Pa buys Emma originally to win a horse race at the county fair.

Nick is the Kettles' prized black bull. He spends most of his time living on the Kettles' farm, which is his main home, but in Ma and Pa Kettle at Home, he sneaks out of the farm and lumbers towards the Maddocks' farm to visit one of John Maddocks' prize cows, Bessie. He is often seen wearing a derby hat on his head, similar to the hat worn by Pa Kettle.

The goats are herd of four white Saanen goats that live on the Kettles' farm. In Ma and Pa Kettle at Home, their original owner, John Maddocks, sells them to Pa Kettle for $100 (equivalent to $1,199 in 2025). The goats spend most of their time grazing around the farm, but the largest of them, a large billy with massive, curved horns, often causes everyone trouble. In Ma and Pa Kettle at Home, he butts Ma, then Mannering, and lastly Pa, after they turn their backs to him. In Ma and Pa Kettle Back on the Farm, he starts chewing on several sticks of dynamite which Pa bought to make a new well for Ma, but Pa keeps snatching them from him.

Agnes is the Kettles' family Bluetick Coonhound, which also lives on the farm. She is often seen wearing a sweater that Ma Kettle made for her. In Ma and Pa Kettle at Home, she produces a litter of puppies for the Kettles and their friends at their Christmas Eve party.

== Kettle farm set ==
Kettle Farm
- Ma and Pa Kettle location
- The set as it appears in the film Ma and Pa Kettle Back on the Farm (1951)

The Kettle Farm (also known as Gausman Ranch, playfully named for set decorator Russell A. Gausman) was a movie ranch in Universal Studios, where most of the Ma and Pa Kettle features were filmed. The set was redressed several times to resemble a cluttered farmhouse with dilapidated farm buildings. The Kettles' farmhouse did not appear in Ma and Pa Kettle on Vacation and Ma and Pa Kettle at Waikiki. The farm buildings were restored and painted for Ma and Pa Kettle at Home. The entire farm set was modified for The Kettles in the Ozarks, where it was reused as Uncle Sedge's farm in Arkansas. The remodeled farmhouse was also used for The Kettles on Old MacDonald's Farm. Prior to the Kettle Farm area being demolished in 1969 to begin construction on the Gibson Amphitheatre, it was significantly altered for the filming of Spartacus. Today, this site is The Wizarding World of Harry Potter.

The movie ranch appeared in other films and television series, including:

- The Thing That Couldn't Die (1958)
- The Deputy (1959–1961)
- Alfred Hitchcock Presents (9th season episode "The Jar")
- Adam-12 (1968–1975)

== Films ==
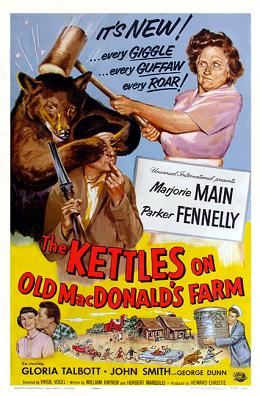
Original film poster.

The ten Kettle films are:

1. The Egg and I (1947)
2. Ma and Pa Kettle (1949) or The Further Adventures of Ma and Pa Kettle
3. Ma and Pa Kettle Go to Town (1950)
4. Ma and Pa Kettle Back on the Farm (1951)
5. Ma and Pa Kettle at the Fair (1952)
6. Ma and Pa Kettle on Vacation (1953)
7. Ma and Pa Kettle at Home (1954)
8. Ma and Pa Kettle at Waikiki (1955)
9. The Kettles in the Ozarks (1956)
10. The Kettles on Old MacDonald's Farm (1957)

=== The Egg and I ===
Ma and Pa Kettle first appeared in supporting roles as neighbors in The Egg and I, starring Fred MacMurray and Claudette Colbert as a refined city couple who move to a rural chicken farm. Marjorie Main, a veteran character actress, played a hardy country woman in dozens of films, so was a natural for the role of Ma Kettle. Main was nominated for the Academy Award for Best Supporting Actress.

=== Ma and Pa Kettle series ===
After the success of The Egg and I, Marjorie Main and Percy Kilbride starred in their own series of Ma and Pa Kettle movies, which became box-office bonanzas for Universal Pictures, having earned an estimated $35 million for the entire series.

Universal insisted on releasing only one Kettle picture annually, during the spring months. Consequently there was a backlog of completed but unreleased films. Ma and Pa Kettle Go to Paris was ultimately released as Ma and Pa Kettle on Vacation; Ma and Pa Kettle Hit the Road Home became Ma and Pa Kettle at Home. Kilbride retired after the latter film in 1953, primarily from boredom with the character, as well as health concerns. Kilbride's farewell film was Ma and Pa Kettle at Waikiki, filmed in February 1952 but finally released in 1955.

=== The Kettles films ===
In 1954 Universal assigned the Kettle producer, director, and writer to make a new rustic comedy with Main but without Kilbride, Ricochet Romance, while trying to persuade Kilbride to return to the series. When Kilbride refused, the studio kept the franchise going by dropping "Pa Kettle" from the film titles and referring to the series as "The Kettles."

Arthur Hunnicutt played Pa's brother Sedge Kettle in The Kettles in the Ozarks (1956). The next film brought back Pa Kettle in the person of Parker Fennelly, who had played homespun, laconic types on radio; The Kettles on Old MacDonald's Farm (1957) was not successful enough to prolong the series, but Universal kept the older films playing in theaters into the 1960s.

=== Box office rankings ===
At the height of the popularity of the series, exhibitors polled by Quigley Publishing voted Kilbride and Main among the most popular stars in the US:

- 1951 - Marjorie Main alone 15th-most popular star
- 1952 - Main and Kilbride 25th-most popular
- 1953 - Main and Kilbride 13th-most popular
- 1954 - Main and Kilbride 15th-most popular
- 1955 - Main and Kilbride 25th-most popular

== Adaptations and revivals ==
Betty MacDonald's characters Ma and Pa Kettle also appeared in television's first comedy serial, The Egg and I, which aired on CBS (September 3, 1951 – August 1, 1952). Each episode was only 15 minutes long. Ma Kettle was played by Doris Rich and Pa Kettle was played by Frank Twedell. Betty Lynn (better known as Barney Fife's girlfriend Thelma Lou from The Andy Griffith Show) played Betty MacDonald in some episodes, including "Pa Turns Over a New Leaf" (which aired on May 21, 1952). The role was usually played by Pat Kirkland. Another episode, "The Purloined Jacket", starred Mary Perry as Cammy, Richard Carlyle as Joe Kettle, and William A. Lee as Ed Peabody.

Animator Walter Lantz produced a short-lived cartoon series for Universal Pictures called "Maw and Paw", although only four cartoons were released between 1953 and 1955. The characters Maw and Paw (voiced by Grace Stafford and Dal McKennon, respectively) were based on the characters of Ma and Pa Kettle. The spellings of Maw and Paw Kettle appeared in the book The Egg and I (1945). Another Walter Lantz cartoon, "The Ostrich Egg And I" (1956), from the Maggie & Sam series, was a spoof of The Egg and I, with Maggie voiced by Grace Stafford and Sam voiced by Daws Butler.

In The Munsters season-one episode "Family Portrait" (S01 E13, 1964-12-17), a magazine writer makes a reference to the Kettles when he sees the Munster home, which he implies resembles the Kettle farmhouse: "Let's see if Ma and Pa Kettle are home."

In several Warner Bros. cartoons of the 1950s and 1960s, prolific voice artist June Foray imitates Marjorie Main's voice whenever a big, aggressive female character appears in the cartoon. Many boomer kids became familiar with Foray's version of Main's voice before they discovered Marjorie Main as the source of Foray's imitation.

The satirical film Loose Shoes (1980), which starred Bill Murray, included a sketch called "A Visit With Ma and Pa", where Ma Kettle was played by Ysabel MacCloskey and Pa Kettle was played by Walker Edmiston.

== DVD releases ==
The Adventures of Ma and Pa Kettle Volume 1

as the first part of Universal's Franchise Collection series.

- The Egg and I
- Ma and Pa Kettle
- Ma and Pa Kettle Go to Town
- Ma and Pa Kettle Back on the Farm

The Adventures of Ma and Pa Kettle Volume 2

as the second part of Universal's Franchise Collection series.

- Ma and Pa Kettle at the Fair
- Ma and Pa Kettle on Vacation
- Ma and Pa Kettle at Home
- Ma and Pa Kettle at Waikiki

The Further Adventures of the Kettles

as a TCM Vault Collection presented by Universal Studios:

- The Kettles in the Ozarks
- The Kettles on Old MacDonald's Farm

The Ma and Pa Kettle Complete Comedy Collection

as a TCM Vault Collection presented by Universal Studios:

- The Egg and I
- Ma and Pa Kettle
- Ma and Pa Kettle Go to Town
- Ma and Pa Kettle Back on the Farm
- Ma and Pa Kettle at the Fair
- Ma and Pa Kettle on Vacation
- Ma and Pa Kettle at Home
- Ma and Pa Kettle at Waikiki
- The Kettles in the Ozarks
- The Kettles on Old MacDonald's Farm
