= Percy Kilbride =

American character actor (1888–1964)

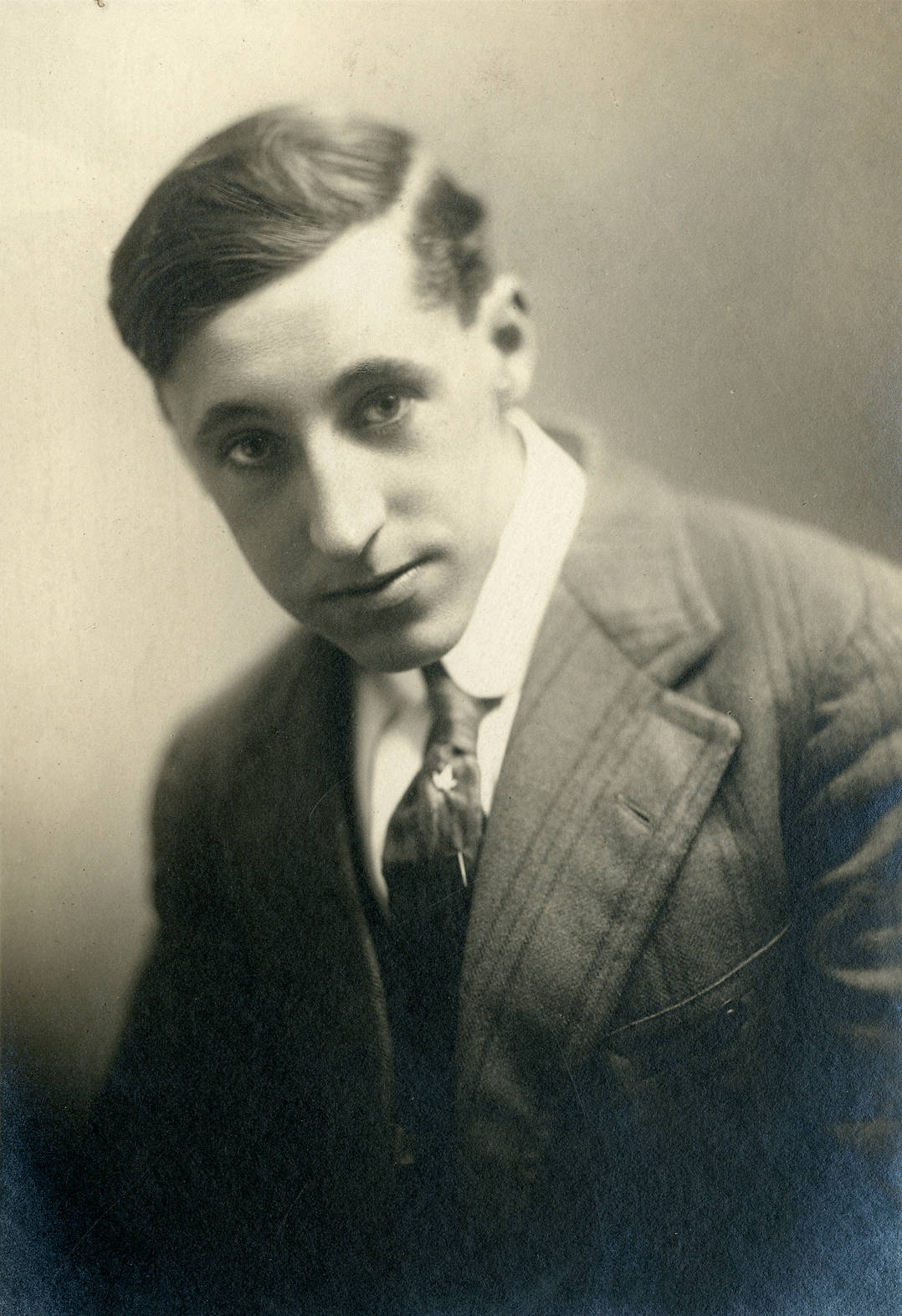
- Kilbride in 1910
- Born: Percy William Kilbride; July 16, 1888; San Francisco, California, U.S.
- Died: December 11, 1964 (aged 76); Los Angeles, California, U.S.
- Resting place: Golden Gate National Cemetery
- Occupation: Actor
- Years active: 1928–1955

Percy William Kilbride (July 16, 1888 – December 11, 1964) was an American character actor. He made a career of playing country "hicks," most memorably as Pa Kettle in the Ma and Pa Kettle series of feature films.

== Early life ==
Kilbride was born in San Francisco, California, the son of Elizabeth (née Kelly), a native of Maryland, and Owen Kilbride, a Canadian.

== Career ==
Kilbride began working in the theater in 1900, at the age of 12, as a call boy at San Francisco's Central Theatre. After five years on the San Francisco stage, he played light-comedy roles for stock companies in Boston, Albany, Syracuse, Trenton, and Philadelphia, and eventually left to become an actor on Broadway. He first played an 18th-century French dandy in A Tale of Two Cities. His film debut was as Jakey in White Woman (1933), a Pre-Code film starring Carole Lombard. He left Broadway for good in 1942, when Jack Benny insisted that Kilbride reprise his Broadway role in the film version of George Washington Slept Here. According to Benny, Percy Kilbride was the same character offscreen and on: quiet and friendly but principled, refusing to be paid more or less than what he considered a fair salary. Kilbride followed up the Benny film with a featured role in the Olsen and Johnson comedy Crazy House (1943). In 1945, he appeared in The Southerner.

Kilbride as Pa Kettle circa 1950

In 1947, he and Marjorie Main appeared in The Egg and I, starring Fred MacMurray and Claudette Colbert as a sophisticated couple taking on farm life. Main and Kilbride were featured as folksy neighbors Ma and Pa Kettle, and audience response prompted the popular Ma and Pa Kettle series. Pa Kettle became Kilbride's most famous role: the gentle-spirited and incredibly lazy Pa rarely raised his voice, and was always ready to help friends—by borrowing from other friends, or assigning any kind of labor to his American Indian friends Geoduck and Crowbar.

Since Universal insisted on releasing only one Kettle feature annually, during the spring months, there was already a backlog of unreleased pictures. Ma and Pa Kettle at Waikiki, filmed in February 1952, was not released for another three years. Kilbride withdrew from the series in 1953 after filming Ma and Pa Kettle Hit the Road Home. It was released in 1954 as Ma and Pa Kettle at Home.

Kilbride retired only from Pa Kettle, not from acting. Although the Kettle films were lucrative and "Kilbride has had a lot of fun making them," wrote columnist Frank Scully, "they have cost him a lot of fat parts on the home lot and elsewhere. He was picked for Return of the Texan only to be shelved for Walter Brennan because the front office thought it would be too tough a job getting that shiftless Kettle out of the public mind." In a 1953 interview, Kilbride discussed the monotony of his career due to his portrayal of Pa Kettle:

I had my training on the stage, where I did a variety of roles. That's the fun of being an actor: to meet the challenge of creating new characters. But Pa Kettle is always the same. He can do anything; there is no need to establish any motivation. There's no kick in doing him over and over again. I have had dozens of offers to do television series, but I have turned them all down. I might do one-shot appearances; but I won't let myself get tied down to one character.

Kilbride had tried to break away from Pa Kettle, playing character roles in other films through 1950. However, he became so familiar in the Kettle pictures that he wound up playing the role almost exclusively. The one exception was a 1952 industrial film promoting home appliances; Kilbride's dry delivery provided, appropriately enough, a voice for a dehumidifier.

Kilbride lived alone in an apartment on Whitley Avenue in Los Angeles, just off Hollywood Boulevard. Pa Kettle was even a dangerous influence on his personal life: "I've reached the time in life when I should own a house and settle down, but I know that Kettle virus would paralyze me when it came to mowing a lawn, sweeping off a porch, or changing a light bulb."

== Death ==
On September 21, 1964, Kilbride and another actor, Ralph Belmont, were struck by a motorist while crossing the street in Hollywood.

Belmont died instantly; Kilbride died three months later from atherosclerosis and terminal pneumonia which were caused by head injuries, having undergone brain surgery at the Good Samaritan Hospital in Los Angeles on November 11, aged 76.

A veteran of World War I, Kilbride was buried at Golden Gate National Cemetery in San Bruno, California. Kilbride, who never married, left his estate to four nephews and a sister-in-law.

== Filmography ==
Year	Title	Role	Notes
1933	White Woman	Jakey	
1936	Soak the Rich	Everett, 2d detective	
1942	George Washington Slept Here	Mr. 'Kimbie' Kimber, the Handyman	
1942	Keeper of the Flame	Orion Peabody	
1943	Crazy House	Col. Cornelius Merriweather	
1943	The Woman of the Town	Rev. Samuel Small	
1944	Knickerbocker Holiday	Schermerhorn	
1944	The Adventures of Mark Twain	Billings, Enterprise Typesetter	
1944	She's a Soldier Too	Jonathan Kittredge	
1944	Guest in the House	John – the Butler	
1945	The Southerner	Harmie	
1945	State Fair	Dave Miller	
1945	Fallen Angel	Pop	
1945	She Wouldn't Say Yes	Judge Whittaker	
1946	The Well Groomed Bride	Mr. Dawson	
1947	The Egg and I	Franklin "Pa" Kettle	
1947	Welcome Stranger	Nat Dorkas	
1947	Riffraff	Pop	
1948	You Were Meant for Me	Mr. Andrew Mayhew	
1948	Black Bart	Jersey Brady	
1948	Feudin', Fussin', and A-Fightin'	Billy Caswell	
1948	You Gotta Stay Happy	Mr. Racknell	
1949	The Sun Comes Up	Mr. Willie B. Williegood	
1949	Ma and Pa Kettle	Pa Kettle	
1949	Mr. Soft Touch	Rickle	
1949	Free for All	Henry J. Abbott	
1950	Ma and Pa Kettle Go to Town	Pa Kettle	
1950	Riding High	Pop Jones	
1951	Ma and Pa Kettle Back on the Farm	Pa Kettle	
1952	Ma and Pa Kettle at the Fair	Pa Kettle	
1952	Ellis in Freedomland	The Dehumidifier	Voice
1953	Ma and Pa Kettle on Vacation	Pa Kettle	
1954	Ma and Pa Kettle at Home	Pa Kettle	Final film role
1955	Ma and Pa Kettle at Waikiki	Pa Kettle	Filmed in 1952; held back from release
