= The Egg and I =

1945 memoir by Betty MacDonald

- Dust jacket from 1946 edition
- Author: Betty MacDonald
- Language: English
- Genre: Humor
- Publisher: J. B. Lippincott
- Publication date: 1945
- Publication place: United States
- Pages: 287
- ISBN: 978-0-06-091428-8
- LC Class: AGR 45-336

The Egg and I, first published in 1945, is a humorous memoir by American author Betty MacDonald about her adventures and travels as a young wife on a chicken farm on the Olympic Peninsula in the US state of Washington. The book is based on the author's experiences as a newlywed trying to acclimate to and operate a small chicken farm near Chimacum, Washington, with her first husband, Robert Heskett, from 1927 to 1931. On visits with her family in Seattle, she told stories of their tribulations, which greatly amused them. In the 1940s, MacDonald's older sister, Mary, strongly encouraged her to write a book about these experiences. The Egg and I was MacDonald's first attempt at writing a book.

== Plot ==
MacDonald begins her book with a summary description of her childhood and family. Her father was a mining engineer, and moved frequently with his family throughout the West. Her mother's theory that a wife must support her husband in his career comes into play when the author marries a friend of her brother (Bob), who soon admits that his dream is to leave his current office job and start a chicken ranch. Knowing nothing about farming, but eager to support her husband, the author encourages the dream, but is unprepared for the primitive conditions that exist on the farm he purchases.

From this "set-up", the book turns to anecdotal stories that rely upon the proverbial "fish out of water" tales that pit MacDonald against her situation and her surroundings, such as the struggle to keep up with the need for water, which needs to be hand carried from a pond to the house until a tank is installed, or keeping a fire going in "Stove", or the constant care that chicks need. At one point, a guest expresses envy of MacDonald and her husband, imagining that they live a life full of fresh air and beautiful scenery, whereupon MacDonald notes that while the guest had lounged in bed that morning, she and her husband had been up before sunrise working for several hours, and then again worked long into the night after the guest had gone to bed.

MacDonald chronicles the gradual improvements to the primitive farmhouse, such as the arrival of electricity and running water. The neighbors and townspeople are also described in the book. The "Ma and Pa Kettle" characters are near neighbors to the MacDonalds.

== Release ==
First published by the J. B. Lippincott Company on October 3, 1945, The Egg and I received laudatory reviews and soon appeared on the best-seller list. The book was a blockbuster success, being reprinted on a nearly monthly basis for the next two years.

On September 12, 1946, the specially bound one-millionth copy of the book was presented to MacDonald by Washington Governor Monrad Wallgren at a luncheon in Seattle.

The Egg and I was reprinted in a short-run hardback edition in 1986 as well as reprinted under the Harper Perennial paperback imprint.

The Egg and I has sold more than three million copies, and has been translated into 32 languages.

== Adaptations ==
In April 1946, Universal-International announced the purchase of the film rights for The Egg and I for $100,000, plus a percentage of profits. Claudette Colbert and Fred MacMurray were cast in the lead roles, with Marjorie Main and Percy Kilbride cast in the roles of Ma and Pa Kettle. The film, loosely based on the book, was released in 1947. Main received an Oscar nomination for Best Supporting Actress, and the film inspired nine subsequent Ma and Pa Kettle features.

A 15-minute daytime TV series based on the book aired on CBS from September 3, 1951, to August 1, 1952. The program starred Bob Craven and Patricia Kirkland.

== Criticism ==
Although the book was a critical and popular success at publication, it has been criticized for its racist treatment of Native Americans. In 2005, a literary critic examining MacDonald's body of work wrote, “Without overcoming or correcting the racism in Egg, her stories in her subsequent books describe and implicitly advocate the benefits of a multicultural society (especially those available in an urban space like Seattle)."

The Egg and I has also been claimed to have "spawned a perception of Washington as a land of eccentric country bumpkins like Ma and Pa Kettle." MacDonald's defenders point out that in the context of the 1940s, such stereotyping was far more acceptable. MacDonald faced two lawsuits over the book’s content (see below); plaintiffs did not prevail, although the judge indicated he felt they had shown that some of the claims of defamation had merit.

== Post-publication lawsuits ==
Following the success of the book and film, lawsuits were filed by members of the Chimacum community. They claimed that characters in The Egg and I had been based on them, and that they had been identified in their community as the real-life versions of those characters, subjecting them to ridicule and humiliation. The family of Albert and Susanna Bishop claimed they had been negatively portrayed as the Kettles. Their oldest son Edward and his wife Ilah Bishop filed the first lawsuit, which was settled out of court for an undisclosed amount.

The second lawsuit was filed against MacDonald, publisher J. B. Lippincott Company, and The Bon Marché (a Seattle department store which had promoted and distributed the book) for total damages of $975,000, as sought by nine other members of the Bishop family ($100,000 each) and Raymond H. Johnson ($75,000), who claimed he had been portrayed as the Indian "Crowbar". The case was heard before a jury and Judge William J. Wilkins (who was also one of the presiding judges at the Nuremberg Trials) in King County Superior Court beginning February 6, 1951. MacDonald testified that the characters in her book were composite sketches of various people she had met. The defense produced evidence that the Bishop family had actually been trying to profit from the fame the book and movie had brought them, including testimony that son Walter Bishop had had his father Albert appear onstage at his Belfair, Washington, dance hall with chickens under his arm, introducing him as "Pa Kettle". On February 10, 1951, the jury decided in favor of the author.

== In popular culture ==
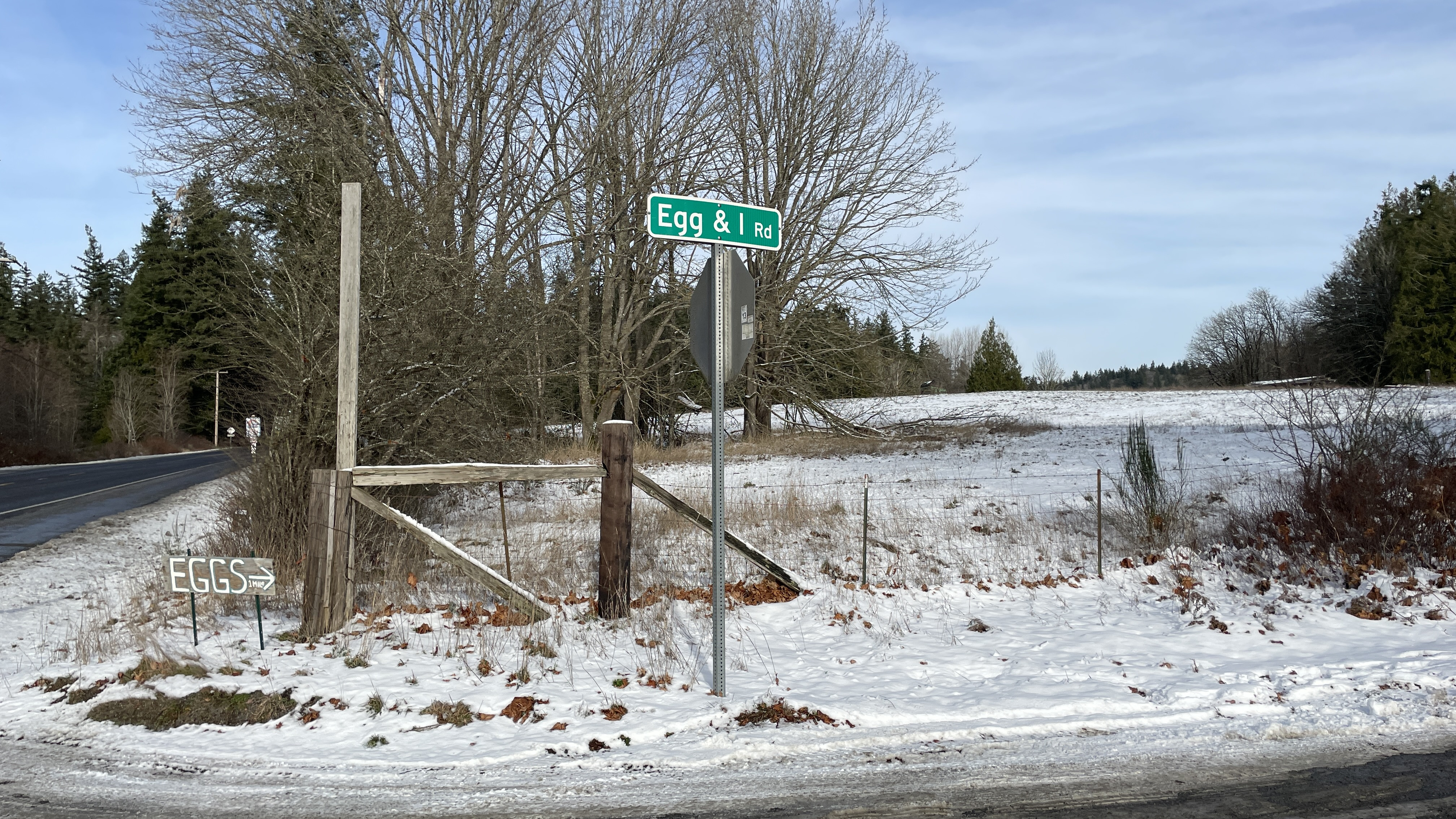
Sign for Egg and I Road, near Chimacum, Washington

Recordings of the theme song from the film were made by Sammy Kaye for Victor, and Dinah Shore for Columbia.

The road leading west from Beaver Valley Road (State Route 19) to the former site of MacDonald's farm is now named "Egg and I Road".
