= Tales of Frankenstein =

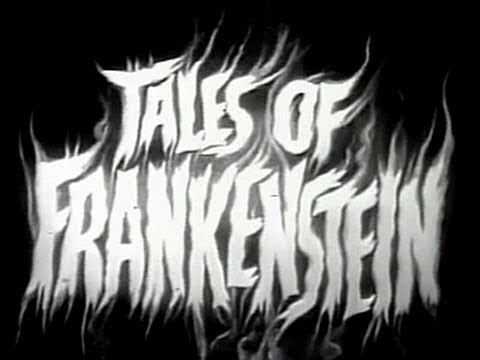
- Title card
- Genre: Horror
- Written by: Jerome Bixby (uncredited); Henry Kuttner; C. L. Moore (as Catherine Kuttner); Curt Siodmak
- Directed by: Curt Siodmak
- Starring: Anton Diffring; Helen Westcott; Don Megowan
- Countries of origin: United States; Great Britain
- Original language: English

Production
- Producers: Michael Carreras; Curt Siodmak
- Cinematography: Gert Anderson
- Editor: Anthony DiMarco (as Tony DiMarco)
- Running time: 28 minutes
- Production companies: Hammer Film Productions; Screen Gems

Tales of Frankenstein is an unsold TV pilot filmed in 1958. It was a co-production of Hammer Film Productions and Screen Gems, the television subsidiary of Columbia Pictures. The film is a mixture of elements from both the Hammer and Universal Pictures versions of Frankenstein, based on Mary Shelley's 1818 novel Frankenstein; or, The Modern Prometheus. The episode title, which does not appear onscreen, is "The Face in the Tombstone Mirror". The film is in the public domain.

== Plot ==
Baron Frankenstein sends his servants away every night, even in the worst weather, so he can be alone with his experiments. One night he brings his creation to life, but having the brain of a murderer, it tries to strangle him. In the struggle it is accidentally electrocuted. He decides he needs to find a new brain, from someone more intelligent.

That night, Paul and Christine Halpert arrive in the village, to visit the Baron. They are hoping he can cure Paul's illness, but the Baron refuses, telling them that a hospital can do more than he can. The couple stay at a local inn and consult the village doctor. It is no use; Paul dies.

The Baron pays the cemetery groundskeeper to leave the grave unsealed the night after the funeral. Christine finds the grave defiled the next day, with a locket that was buried with Paul lying on the ground. Christine coerces the groundskeeper to tell her who paid him to leave the grave open. He tells her it was Frankenstein.

Frankenstein has by this time transplanted Paul's brain into the body of the Monster. As Paul discovers his new body, he becomes violent and pursues the Baron. Christine arrives at the castle to find out what the Baron did with Paul. The Baron tries to feign ignorance until the Monster smashes into the room to kill Frankenstein.

Paul chases the Baron outside, through woods and old castle ruins before catching up with him. Christine stops him from harming the Baron, reminding him that the Baron had only done what they asked. She tells him he was a good man and begs him not to throw it away just because of a hideous body.

Paul throws himself down some castle ruins, and is buried. Frankenstein tries to dig him out, but the constable arrives to charge him with body snatching.

As he is being arrested, the Baron tells the policeman, "You have your job to do, and so have I – and I don't think either of us would let anything stand in the way of our respective destinies...time is a small matter... there is always tomorrow."

== Cast ==
- Anton Diffring ... Baron Frankenstein
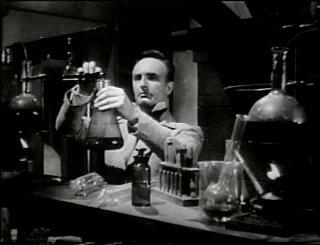
  Anton Diffring as Baron Frankenstein
- Helen Westcott ... Christine Halpert
- Don Megowan ... The Monster
- Ludwig Stössel ... Wilhelm
- Richard Bull ... Paul Halpert
- Raymond Greenleaf ... Doctor
- Peter Brocco ... Gottfried—Cemetery Caretaker
- Sydney Mason ... Police Chief
- David Hoffman ... Head in crystal ball (archive footage) (uncredited)
- Ben Wright ... Narrator (uncredited)

== Production ==
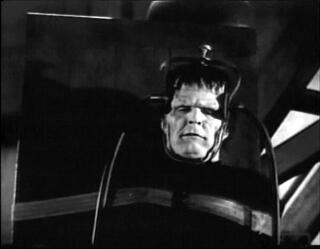
Don Megowan as the Monster

Hammer and Columbia planned to produce a series of 26 episodes, with each studio handling 13 episodes. The producers wanted the series to be about Baron Frankenstein and his experiments. Director Curt Siodmak argued that "You cannot carry a whole show with nothing but Frankenstein stories."

Michael Carreras intended the series to introduce Hammer to America, and wanted to give it a good chance. He enlisted Jimmy Sangster, fresh off The Revenge of Frankenstein, to write a pilot, "The Single Minded Black-Mailer". Other writers provided five more scripts depicting an amoral Baron Frankenstein in the Hammer style.

Friction developed between the two studios because Columbia at that time held the TV rights to the Universal Monsters film series through their Shock Theater film package and wanted to use that version of Frankenstein. Hammer, on the other hand, wanted to base the series on their own The Curse of Frankenstein. The only real input Hammer had was in the choice of Anton Diffring, who played Frankenstein very much like Peter Cushing. Diffring went on to star in Hammer's The Man Who Could Cheat Death the following year.

Since the series was intended for an American audience, Columbia rejected all six of Hammer's scripts in favor of one written in-house. The film was co-written by Henry Kuttner and his wife C. L. Moore with Curt Siodmak, a veteran of Universal horror films, including The Wolf Man, who also directed. Another script, "Frankenstein Meets Dr. Varno", was written by Jerome Bixby.

The Monster was the flat-headed Universal Pictures version popularized by Boris Karloff and was played by Don Megowan, primarily a Western actor. Megowan also played the creature known as the Gill-man on land in The Creature Walks Among Us.

Disgusted with their lack of input, Carreras went back to England, leaving Anthony Hinds to represent Hammer. Soon, he also gave up.

== Legacy ==
Though the series was never produced, Anthony Hinds commissioned several scripts that provided Hammer with material for their later Frankenstein films. In one story by A.R. Rawlinson, Frankenstein created a beautiful woman with no soul (Frankenstein Created Woman); in another by Peter Bryan (The Hound of the Baskervilles), Frankenstein hires a mystic to hypnotize the Monster (The Evil of Frankenstein).
