= Tom Hennesy =

American actor and stuntman

- Born: August 4, 1923; Los Angeles, California, U.S.
- Died: May 23, 2011 (aged 87); Malibu, California, U.S.
- Education: University of Southern California
- Occupations: Actor, stuntman

Tom Hennesy (August 4, 1923 – May 23, 2011) was an American actor and stuntman. He is known for playing the Gill-man on land in Revenge of the Creature, the second installment of the Creature from the Black Lagoon trilogy.

== Early life ==
Hennessy was born in Los Angeles, California. He attended the University of California, Los Angeles and the University of Southern California (USC). As a football player at USC he played in the 1943 and 1944 Rose Bowl Games. He graduated from USC.

== Career ==
Hennesy began his film and television career as a stuntman and actor while he was in college and playing football at USC. Hennessy played the title role in the Universal horror film Revenge of the Creature, the sequel to Creature from the Black Lagoon. Hennesy served in the United States Navy during World War II. Hennesy acted in and performed stunts for numerous John Wayne and John Ford films. Hennesy was the stunt double for many stars, including Rock Hudson, Randolph Scott, Rod Cameron, Jeff Chandler, and more.

In 1955 Warner Bros. signed Hennesy to be a double and stunt man for its Cheyenne TV series.

Hennesy also worked as a general secondary and elementary school teacher in many Hollywood studios. His students included Billy Chapin, Sal Mineo, Natalie Wood, Annette Funicello, Paul Anka, Tim Considine, Molly Bee, Tommy Rettig, and Lauren Chapin.

In Hennesy's later years he was head of an oil production company that his family owned.

== Filmography ==
- It Should Happen to You (1954) - Board Member (uncredited)
- Prince Valiant (1954) - Knight (uncredited)
- The Long Gray Line (1955) - Cadet Dotson (uncredited)
- Prince of Players (1955) - Man in Tavern (uncredited)
- Revenge of the Creature (1955) - The Gill Man (on Land) / Marineland Diver (uncredited)
- The Road to Denver (1955) - Man (uncredited)
- Onionhead (1958) - Minor Role (uncredited)
- The Buccaneer (1958) - Pirate (uncredited)
- The Alamo (1960) - Bull (uncredited)
- North to Alaska (1960) - Outlaw (uncredited)
- The Comancheros (1961) - Gordo - Gralie's Bodyguard (uncredited)
- The Man Who Shot Liberty Valance (1962) - Buck Langhorn (uncredited)
- The War Wagon (1967) - Bartender (uncredited)
- The Green Berets (1968) - Soldier (uncredited)
- Big Jake (1971) - Mr. Sweet (uncredited)
- Squares (1972) - Hilly (final film role)

== Television ==
- The Mickey Rooney Show - episode "Tiger Mulligan" (1954) - Jack Corey
- The Mickey Rooney Show - episode "The Basketball Star" (1955) - Tom
- The Further Adventures of Spin and Marty (1956) - North Fork Counselor
- 26 Men- episode - Cattle Embargo (1958) - Jeff Conley
- Colt .45 - episode - Amnesty (1959) - Harry
- Tales of Wells Fargo - episode - The Barefoot Bandit (1961) - Miller Sledge
- Thriller - episode - The Return of Andrew Bentley (1961) - The Familiar
- Gunsmoke - episode - Cody's Code (1962) - Art (uncredited)
- Have Gun - Will Travel - episode - Taylor's Woman (1962) - Clyde Moss
- Temple Houston - episode - The Law and Big Annie (1964)
- Hondo - episode - Hondo and the Comancheros (1967) - Poker Player (uncredited)

== Stuntman filmography ==
- Iron Man (1951)
- Jack and the Beanstalk (Stunt Double: Buddy Baer) (1952)
- Trouble Along the Way (1953)
- The President's Lady (Stunt Double: Charlton Heston) (1953)
- The Robe (1953)
- The High and the Mighty (1954)
- The Caine Mutiny (1954)
- Prince of Players (1955)
- The Road to Denver (1955)
- Cheyenne (Stunt Double: Clint Walker) (TV series) (1955)
- Blood Alley (1955)
- The Ten Commandments (1956)
- Onionhead (1958)
- The Buccaneer (1958)
- The Horse Soldiers (1959)
- The Alamo (1960)
- North to Alaska (1960)
- The Comancheros (1961)
- The Man Who Shot Liberty Valence (1962)
- Donovan's Reef (1963)
- McLintock! (1963)
- Stagecoach (1966)
- The War Wagon (1967)
- The Green Berets (1968)
- Big Jake (Stunt Double: Gregg Palmer) (1971)
