= Cultural impact of Creature from the Black Lagoon =

The extensive and persistent impact on media and popular culture of Creature from the Black Lagoon began even before it was seen in theaters. To publicize the release of the film in 1954, Ben Chapman, in costume, introduced the Gill-Man to the public on live television in The Colgate Comedy Hour with Abbott and Costello.

== Film influence ==
Many films featuring monsters put the Gill-Man's likeness in the background as an homage:

- In the 1955 comedy The Seven Year Itch, Marilyn Monroe and Tom Ewell come out of a theater showing Creature from the Black Lagoon. Monroe expresses some sympathy for the Gill-Man, saying that it was not really bad and that it "just wanted to be loved".
- The Gill-man appears in the Rankin/Bass Productions 1967 Halloween film, Mad Monster Party?, as one of many monsters invited to Baron Boris von Frankenstein's monster reunion party. It also appears in the Rankin/Bass TV film Mad Mad Mad Monsters as one of many monsters invited to Baron Henry von Frankenstein's wedding of the Monster and his newly created Bride.
- The Gill-man appeared in the film The Monster Squad. "Gill-man" allies itself with Count Dracula, Frankenstein's monster, the Mummy and the Wolfman in order to secure a magical amulet which will allow them to conquer the world. For its appearance in The Monster Squad, the Gill-man was redesigned by Stan Winston in order to merely suggest Milicent Patrick’s original design, due to licensing issues. The Gill-man was the first costume portrayal of Tom Woodruff, Jr. who would later work prominently in the Alien film series.
- Director William Winckler was inspired by the film when producing his 2005 black-and-white horror film Frankenstein vs. the Creature from Blood Cove. In the 90-minute retro monster film, a bio-genetically engineered gill-man was created by the mad scientist Monroe Lazaroff from the mixing the DNA of a human, a fish, and a reptile. It battles Frankenstein's monster on a beach and beneath the waves, with underwater photography reminiscent of the underwater shots in Creature from the Black Lagoon. A stuntman/diver wearing a full-body latex rubber costume was used to portray the Blood Cove creature on camera, not unlike Ben Chapman and Ricou Browning in costume in Creature from the Black Lagoon.
- Multiple Gill-men appear throughout the Hotel Transylvania franchise.
- The 2017 film The Shape of Water is a romantic fantasy between a mute woman and an amphibious creature (performed by Doug Jones) from South America. Director Guillermo del Toro was inspired to make the film from childhood memories of seeing the Julia Adams swimming scene in Creature from the Black Lagoon and hoping the creature would get with the girl.
- The Green Gargantua named Gaira, who first appeared in The War of the Gargantuas, is inspired by Gill-Man, since Eiji Tsuburaya was a big fan of Creature from the Black Lagoon.
- There are several rumors that Toho and Universal Pictures would collaborate on a film where Godzilla would face Gill-Man, this film supposedly began to be created in the late 70s and early 80s, the film would be created in order for Godzilla to form part of the Universal Monsters franchise.

== Television influence ==
- In an Abbott and Costello sketch on TV's The Colgate Comedy Hour, the Gill-man appears in a haunted house after the Frankenstein Monster faints at the sight of Lou Costello.
- A few times in the 1962 TV series McHale's Navy, set during World War 2, characters anachronistically mention the Creature from the Black Lagoon.
- In an episode of the classic TV series The Munsters, the Munster family receives a visit from "Uncle Gilbert" (portrayed by Richard Hale), who proudly refers to himself as the "Creature from the Black Lagoon". He once brought with him $180,000 in gold and Spanish doubloons when visiting the family. Uncle Gilbert used to be a politician as well.
- In the 1965 episode of the original Flipper TV series, "Flipper's Monster", the final episode of the first season, series co-creator Ricou Browning, who had portrayed the Creature in underwater scenes of all three original Creature films, dons a similar costume to portray a sea-monster in a fictional film being shot at series locale Coral Key Park.
- The TV series I'll Be Gone in the Dark repeatedly references the swimming scene from the film.
- In The Comic Strip, the Gill-man has a son named Lagoon.
- The Ultra Series has Ragon, a recurring aquatic monster species resembling the Gill-man that debuted in the Ultra Q episode "The Primordial Amphibian Ragon". While initially portrayed as human-sized, a Ragon mutated to giant size by radioactive energy would battle Ultraman in the Ultraman episode "Five Seconds Before the Explosion".
- At the very end of Scooby-Doo and the Ghoul School, a character who appears to be Gill-man (though colored orange instead of green, presumably for copyright reasons) is briefly seen with his daughter, alongside an unnamed alien and what might be Godzilla (as a giant foot) together with their respective daughters.
- Attack of the Killer Tomatoes: The Animated Series parodied the film in "The Tomato from the Black Lagoon". In this episode, the gang looks for a missing-tomato-link in the San Zucchini Botanical Gardens, whilst they are stalked by an amphibious tomato that goes after Tara (who is also part tomato).
- A character resembling the Gill-man appears in an episode of Tripping the Rift called "Witness Protection".
- The Gill-Man appeared in the Robot Chicken season 3 episode "Shoe", voiced by Seth Green. He tells a man that he prefers the lagoon to be called the "African-American Lagoon". A cartoonish version of the Gill-man appears in the season 4 episode "We Are a Humble Factory", voiced by Breckin Meyer. Learning of the success of Count Chocula, FrankenBerry, and BooBerry, as well as Fruity Yummy Mummy and Fruit Brute appearing as generic monsters who are also jealous of the threesome having their own cereal, the Gill-Man decides to make his own cereal called "Creature with the Black Macaroons" because "macaroon" sounds like "lagoon" and are said to turn milk black. However, the cereal was not successful. When all the cereal were dumped into his lagoon, he says "Should've gone with legumes" as "legume" also sounds like "lagoon". This version of the Gill-man makes appearances in later seasons of Robot Chicken.
- In the Creepshow episode "Model Kid", there is a fictional movie called "Gill-man Meets the Mummy" that had the Gill-man fighting an evil mummy. The protagonist Joe Aurora (portrayed by Brock Duncan) has their action figures alongside other horror movie monsters and the Creep. When he obtains a figure called the voodoo-like "Victim" from a Creepshow comic to deal with his abusive Uncle Kevin (portrayed by Kevin Dillon), he has the Gill-man and the Mummy rip him in half.

== Musical references ==
- Trinidadian calypso singer Lord Melody released a song called "Creature From The Black Lagoon" in 1957. In this song, he is compared to the Gill-Man by his son's friends, which his son protests. This song became one of his signature songs and also endured as a nickname for Melody for many years.
- Dave Edmunds, with his band Rockpile, also performed a song called "Creature from the Black Lagoon". Edmunds' song, included in his 1979 album Repeat When Necessary, was written by Rockpile's lead guitarist Billy Bremner.
- Frankenstein Drag Queens from Planet 13, a band from North Carolina who were fronted by Murderdolls lead singer and solo artist Wednesday 13, also did a song about the Gill-Man, titling it "Creature from the Black Lagoon".
- The heavy metal band Iced Earth also did a song about the Gill-Man called "Dragon's Child" on the Horror Show album.

== Other cultural influences ==
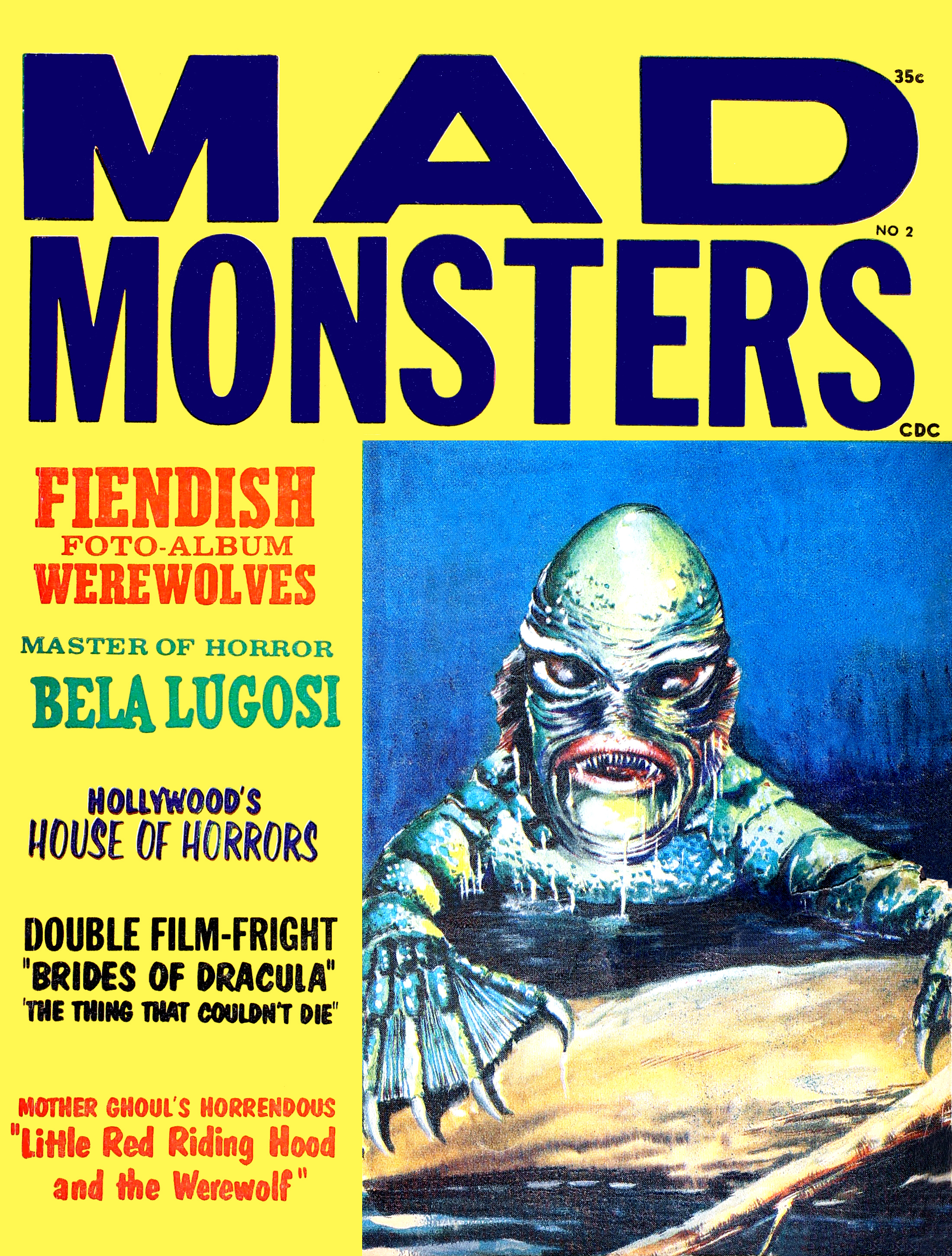
1962 magazine cover depicting the Gill-Man.

- A monster resembling the Gill-man appears in the Jonny Quest episode "The Sea Haunt".
- Creature from the Black Lagoon was made into a pinball game, designed by John Trudreau (a.k.a. "Dr. Flash") and released in 1992 by Midway under the Bally brand name. It has a retro 1950s drive-in theme. Completing side missions causes the screen to display "Universal Presents...Creature from the Black Lagoon", and then requires the player to chase after the monster, just like in the film. The game sold 7,841 units. The Gill-Man is also featured in the 1998 pinball game Monster Bash.
- In the 1995 video game X-COM: Terror from the Deep, the Gill Man appears as an enemy species.
- In the Stephen King novel It, the shape-shifting Pennywise the Clown pursues and kills a victim whilst in the form of the Gill-Man.
- The Creature - referred to as the "Gill Man" - appears as a 1/4th part of the composite creature Monsterex in two of Archie Comics' Teenage Mutant Ninja Turtles Adventures comic specials, The Night of Monsterex and #7: "The Return of... Monsterex!" (1993). It was created when Krang attacked the Ninja Turtles and accidentally fired his mutating ray at their television which was showing a movie where the gill-man alongside a vampire, a Frankenstein monster, and a werewolf were trying to save the Bride of Frankenstein from an unnamed mad scientist. The ray creates Monsterex, a hybrid monster with the head fins, right hand, and left foot of the Gill Man.
- In the video game Golden Sun: The Lost Age, a series of three monsters is based on the Gill-man. They highly resemble it in appearance, and the stronger two of the three are called Gillman and Gillman Lord. They re-appear in the next installment, Golden Sun: Dark Dawn, though their appearance is changed to be more fish-like.
- Monsters resembling the Gill-man make background cameos in the 2012 animated film Hotel Transylvania, its sequels, and the TV series. One pink Gill-man was named Marty (voiced by Robert Smigel).
- The Gill-man's appearance was used for the Swamp Creature in Lego Monster Fighters. The character is also one of the Master Builders in The Lego Movie (2014) while an evil version of the character appears among the inmates of the Phantom Zone in The Lego Batman Movie (2016).
- A creature which closely resembles the Gill-man appears as one of the candidates fighting at Villain-Con to become Scarlet Overkill's new henchman in the 2015 animated film Minions. The creature's name is Frankie Fishlips and is voiced by Andy Nyman.
- The Monster High character Lagoona Blue is the daughter of the Gill-Man.
- In October 2010, Funko released a seven-inch, button-eyed, cuddly version of the Gill-Man.
- Mexican artist José Rodolfo Loaiza Ontiveros created a gallery of images which mixed together various Disney characters and classic Hollywood creatures and villains from horror films. One of those images includes the Gill-man and Disney's Ariel.
- When paleontologist Jenny Clack of the University of Cambridge discovered a fossilized amphibian in what was once a fetid swamp, she named it Eucritta melanolimnetes, which is Greek for "the true creature from the black lagoon".
- In the 2008 video game Fallout 3, the Mirelurk Kings bear a striking resemblance to the Gill-Man.
- In the spin-off comic of The League of Extraordinary Gentlemen featuring Captain Nemo II, the heroes face off against a clone army of Adolf Hitler and Ayesha look-alikes while also contending with the Gill-men.
- The 2011 video game Terraria features an enemy called Creature from the Deep, greatly resembling the Gill-Man.
- The Skylanders franchise features a race of gillmen. Gill Grunt (voiced by Darin De Paul) is a gillman who is a member of the Skylanders.
