= Revenge of the Creature =

1955 American monster film by Jack Arnold

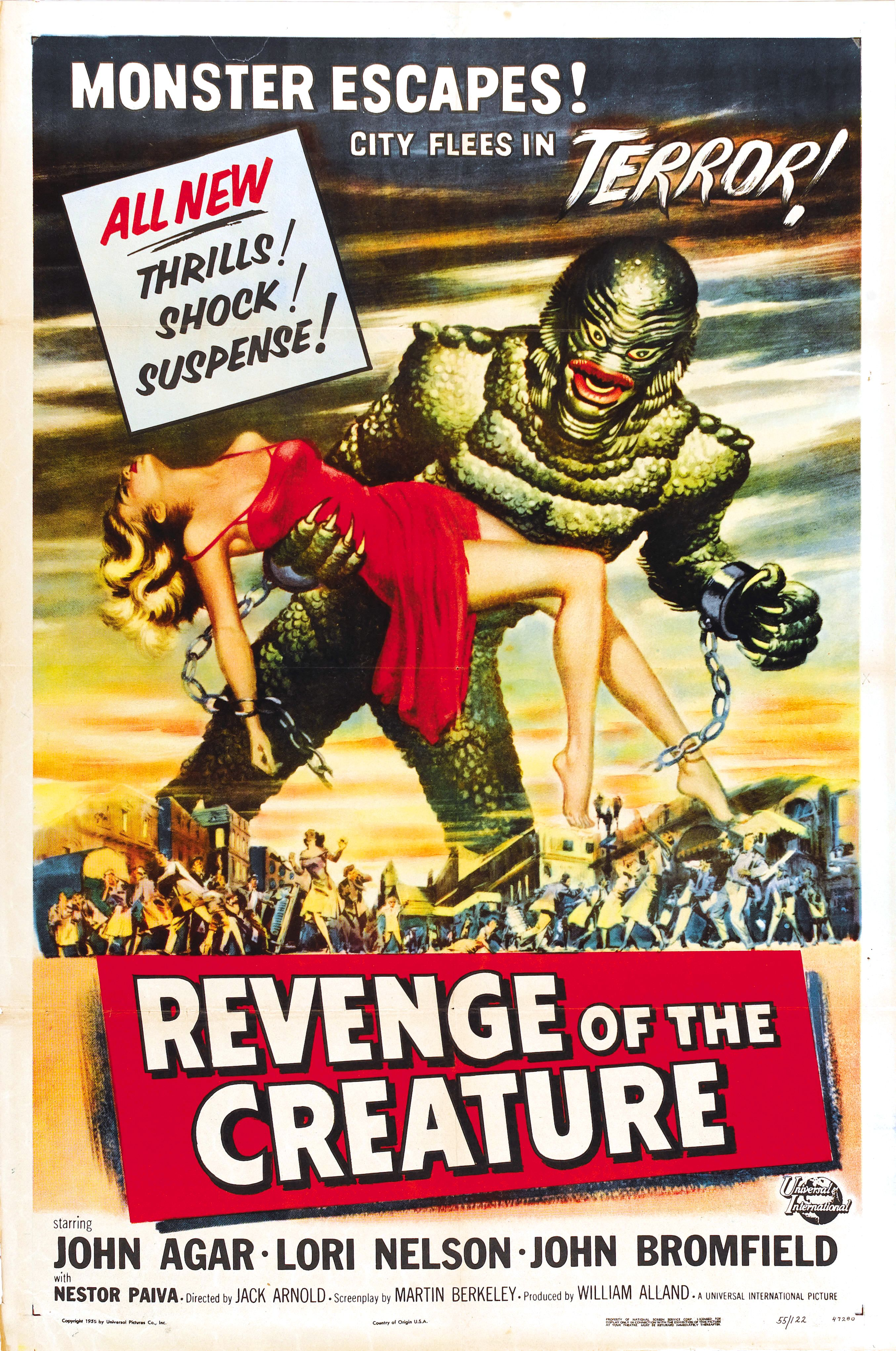
- Theatrical release poster by Reynold Brown
- Directed by: Jack Arnold
- Screenplay by: Martin Berkeley
- Story by: William Alland
- Produced by: William Alland
- Starring: John Agar; Lori Nelson; John Bromfield; Nestor Paiva; Ricou Browning; Tom Hennesy
- Cinematography: Charles S. Welbourne
- Edited by: Paul Weatherwax
- Music by: Herman Stein
- Production company: Universal-International
- Distributed by: Universal Pictures
- Release dates: 11 March 1955 (Illinois); 30 March 1955 (United States)
- Running time: 82 minutes
- Country: United States
- Language: English
- Box office: $1.1 million (US)

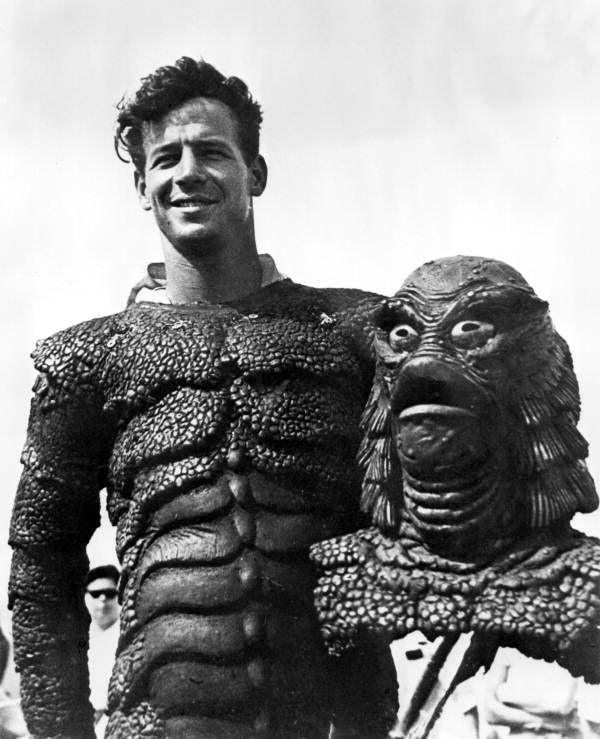
Ricou Browning played the "Gill Man" in the underwater scenes of Creature from the Black Lagoon (1954), Revenge of the Creature (1955), and The Creature Walks Among Us (1956).

Revenge of the Creature (a.k.a. Return of the Creature and Return of the Creature from the Black Lagoon) is a 1955 monster film directed by Jack Arnold and produced and distributed by Universal-International. A sequel to the previous year's Creature from the Black Lagoon, it was the only 3D film released in 1955. Produced by William Alland, the film stars John Agar, Lori Nelson, John Bromfield and Nestor Paiva. The Creature was played by Tom Hennesy on land, and once again, portrayed by Ricou Browning underwater. The film marked the uncredited debut of Clint Eastwood as a laboratory technician.

Revenge of the Creature premiered on March 11, 1955, and received a nationwide theatrical release on March 30, as a double feature with Cult of the Cobra. A "flat", non-3D sequel, The Creature Walks Among Us, followed in 1956.

== Plot ==
Having previously survived being riddled with bullets, the Gill-man is captured and sent to the Ocean Harbor Oceanarium in Florida, where he is studied by animal psychologist Professor Clete Ferguson and ichthyology student Helen Dobson.

Helen and Clete quickly begin to fall in love, much to the chagrin of Joe Hayes, the Gill-man's keeper. The Gill-man takes an instant liking to Helen, which severely hampers Clete's efforts to communicate with him. Ultimately, the Gill-man escapes from his tank, killing Joe in the process, and flees to the open ocean.

Unable to stop thinking about Helen, the Gill-man soon begins to stalk her and Clete, ultimately abducting her from a seaside restaurant where the two are at a party. Clete tries to give chase, but the Gill-man escapes to the water with his captive. Clete and police arrive just in time and when the creature surfaces, police shoot him as Clete saves Helen.

== Cast ==
Actor	Character	Role
John Agar	Prof. Clete Ferguson	A doctor who brings the Gill-Man to the Oceanarium
Lori Nelson	Helen Dobson	Clete's love interest and a doctor who analyses the Gill-Man and soon is kidnapped by him
John Bromfield	Joe Hayes	A worker at the Oceanarium who tries to control the Gill-Man
Nestor Paiva	Lucas	The owner of the ship Rita II (Rita I in the first film), who helps Joe, George, Jackson, Lou and Clete capture the Gill-Man. Paiva reprises his role from the first film.
Grandon Rhodes	Jackson Foster	A worker at the oceanarium who helps capture and transport the Gill-Man
Dave Willock	Lou Gibson	A worker at the oceanarium who also helps in capturing the Gill-Man and transporting it
Robert Williams	George Johnson	Another worker at the oceanarium who helps capture and transport the Gill-Man
Charles Cane	Police Captain	A police officer who helps Clete kill the Gill-Man and save Helen
Robert Hoy	Charlie	A teenager killed by the Gill-Man
Brett Halsey	Pete	Another teenager and Charlie's friend, also killed by the Gill-Man
Ricou Browning	Gill-man (underwater)	Ricou reprises his role from the first film as the Gill-Man in the underwater shots of the film.
Tom Hennesy	Gill-man (on land)	An underwater creature who is kidnapped and taken to the Oceanarium but later manages to escape and cause havoc on the city. Hennesy plays the role Ben Chapman played in the first film.
Jere A. Beery Sr.	News Photographer (tank side)	
Patsy Lee Beery	Girl Necking in Car	
Diane DeLaire	Miss Abbott (uncredited)	A woman teaching art to the chimpanzee Neal
Clint Eastwood	Lab Technician Jennings (uncredited)	A lab technician who appears only briefly

== Production ==
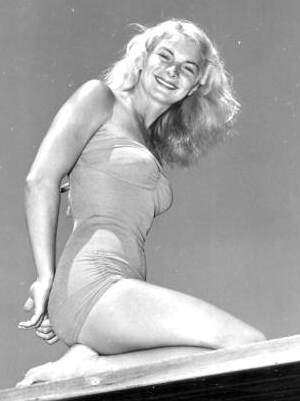
Ginger Stanley did underwater stunts in the first two Creature films.

Using the working titles of Return of the Creature and Return of the Creature from the Black Lagoon, filming took place at Marine Studios which played the part of the film's Ocean Harbor Oceanarium. The St. Johns River stood in for the Amazon in the film.

The Lobster House restaurant where the Creature kidnaps Helen was located in Jacksonville, Florida. It was destroyed by fire in 1962. The Diamondhead Restaurant (now the River City Brewing Co.) was built adjacent to the site where the old Lobster House once stood. Friendship Park was built on the vacant land near where the Lobster House stood.

== Reception ==
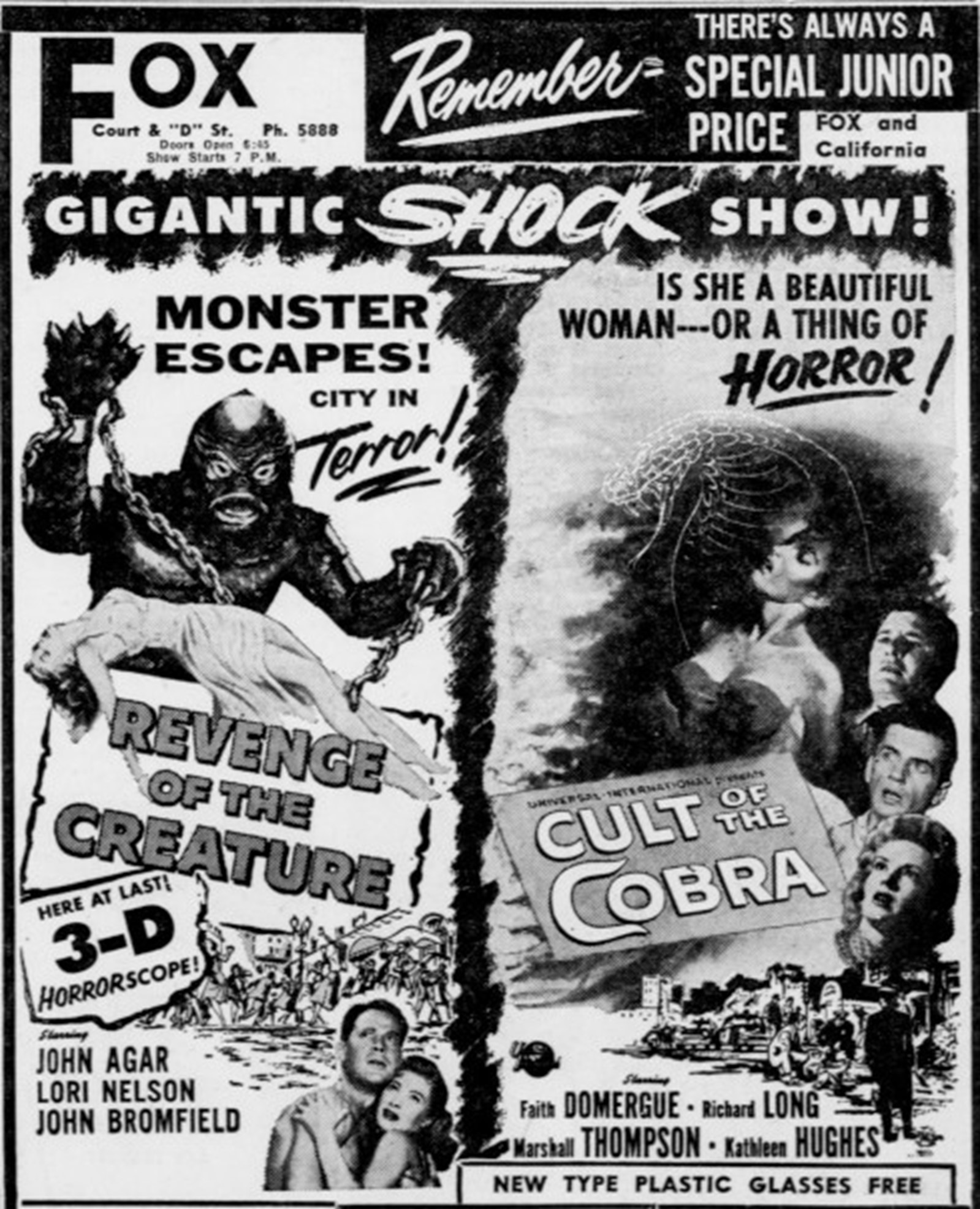
Advertisement from 1955 for Revenge of the Creature and co-feature, Cult of the Cobra.

Critically reviewed in The New York Times, Revenge of the Creature was dismissed as a fourth-rate sequel with the comment, "... away we go, as before". Other than some interesting sequences involving the setting, "what is probably the most unusual aquarium in the world makes a nice, picturesque background indeed ..." the review was dismissive of the production. Writing for AllMovie, author Hal Erickson reported that although the film is "[n]ot nearly as good as the first Creature [from the Black Lagoon], this followup is saved by the underwater photography". Although describing the film as a "minor effort" with "not much that's original or engaging", Craig Butler wrote that "audiences may feel more sympathy for the Creature in this [film], as they see him chained up, starved and otherwise mistreated", and that the film contains "a rare (for the period) attempt to humanize the female lead".

Although Revenge of the Creature has been broadcast on television in red-and-blue-glasses anaglyph form (e.g., in 1982 in the San Francisco Bay area), it was originally shown in theaters by the polarized light method and viewed through glasses with gray polarizing filters. A "flat" version without 3D was also released.

In 1997, Revenge of the Creature was mocked on the comedy television series Mystery Science Theater 3000, marking its first episode on the Sci-Fi Channel.

It has a score of 13% on Rotten Tomatoes with a mean of 3.3 of a possible 10.

== Home media ==
Universal Studios released Revenge of the Creature on VHS in Universal Monsters Classic Collection and DVD in a boxed set, along with Creature from the Black Lagoon and The Creature Walks Among Us. A bonus behind-the-scenes documentary was added for the set. All three films had audio commentaries by Tom Weaver; on "Revenge", he was joined by the movie's star Lori Nelson and fellow monster-movie expert Bob Burns. The "Creature" trilogy was released on Blu-ray in 2018, with Revenge of the Creature on a 2D/3D combination disc along with a 2D/3D combo disc of Creature from the Black Lagoon and a standard Blu-ray disc of The Creature Walks Among Us in the boxed set. However, due to an error with the 3D encoding on the Revenge of the Creature discs, complaints from buyers forced Universal Pictures Home Entertainment to re-press those discs and send free replacement Blu-rays to disgruntled customers. Revenge of the Creature was also released on LaserDisc as a double feature with The Creature Walks Among Us.

== See also ==
- List of American films of 1955
