= Don Megowan =

American actor (1922–1981)

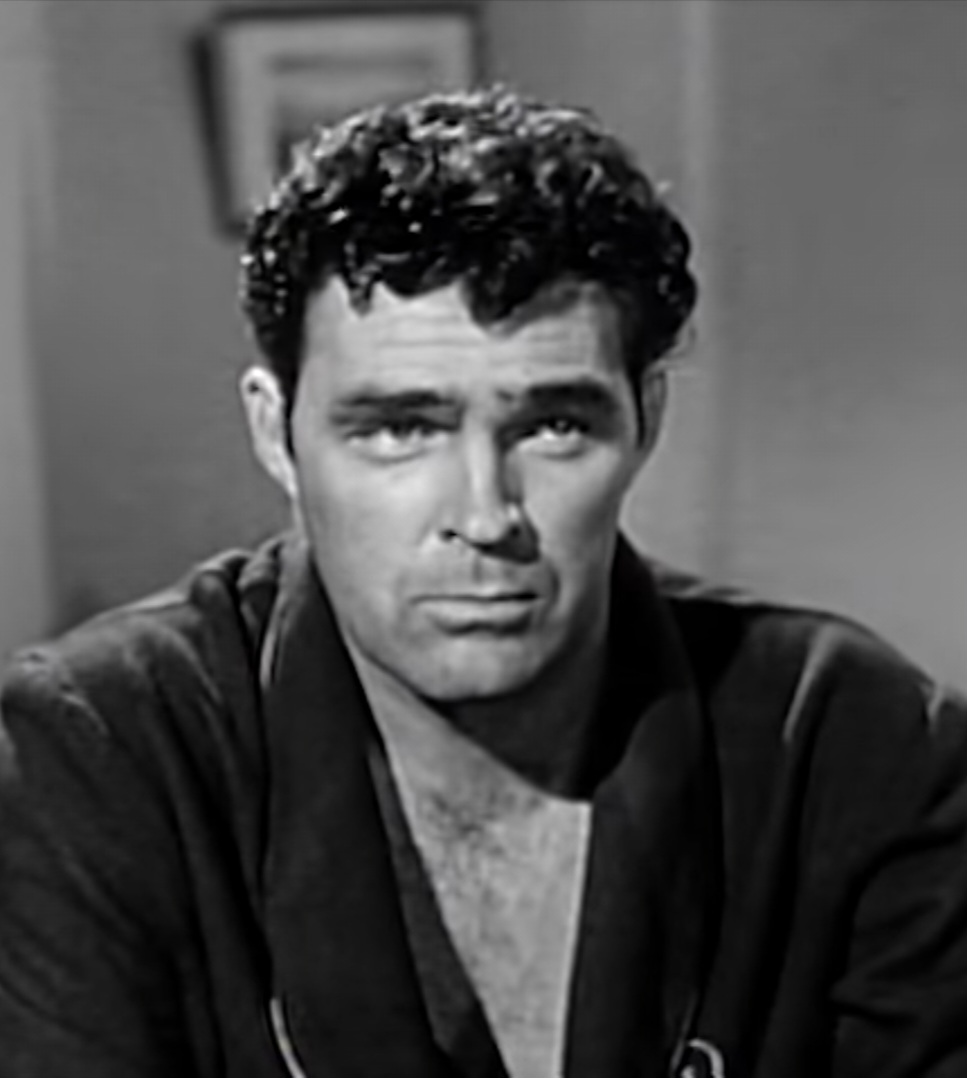
- Megowan in an episode of The Public Defender (1954)
- Born: May 24, 1922; Inglewood, California, U.S.
- Died: June 26, 1981 (aged 59); Panorama City, California, U.S.
- Resting place: Inglewood Park Cemetery
- Occupation: Actor
- Years active: 1951–1979
- Spouses: Bette Megowan (m. 1947; div. 1962); Alva Megowan (m. 1963)
- Children: 2

Don Megowan (May 24, 1922 – June 26, 1981) was an American actor. He played the Gill-man on land in The Creature Walks Among Us, the final part of the Creature from the Black Lagoon trilogy.

== Early life ==
Don Megowan was born in Inglewood, California to Robert and Leila (née Dale) Megowan. His mother Leila worked as a negative cutter for Pathé. At 6 ft 7 in (2.01 m) Megowan was very active in sports, playing baseball, football, and throwing discus. He went to the University of Southern California on a football scholarship before serving in the U.S. Army during World War II.

== Career ==
Megowan starred in the science fiction films The Werewolf in the role of Sheriff Jack Haines, in The Creation of the Humanoids (1962) as a captain in the anti-robot Order of Flesh and Blood, who must stop the Humanoids, and in The Creature Walks Among Us as the Gill-man.

Megowan also appeared in Westerns: Davy Crockett, King of the Wild Frontier (1955), The Great Locomotive Chase (1956), Snowfire (1958), Tarzan and the Valley of Gold (1966), The Devil's Brigade (1968), and Mel Brooks Blazing Saddles (1974), in which he is credited as "Gum Chewer," but actually played the cowboy who walked up on stage to Madeline Kahn during her saloon number.

In 1962, he starred with Cameron Mitchell in the television series, The Beachcomber. He guest starred in various programs, including the Westerns: Gunsmoke (twice), Wagon Train (twice), The Californians, The Tall Man, Maverick, Cimarron City, Have Gun – Will Travel, Tales of Wells Fargo, The Rifleman, Lawman, Cheyenne, Colt .45, Bonanza, The Americans, Rawhide, and Daniel Boone. He was also cast in episodes of such series as Angel, U.S. Marshal, Get Smart, and Fantasy Island.

== Death ==
Megowan, a smoker from age 12 to 48, died of throat cancer at age 59. His weight had dwindled from nearly 300 pounds to barely 150. He is interred in Inglewood Park Cemetery in Inglewood, California.

== Filmography ==
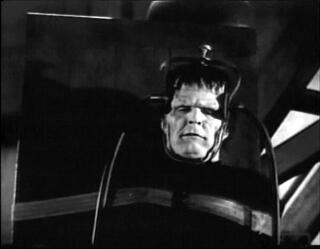
Don Megowan as The Monster in Tales of Frankenstein (1958)

- 1951: The Mob .... Bruiser - Big Longshoreman at Union Hall (uncredited)
- 1951: On the Loose .... Club Emerald Headwaiter (uncredited)
- 1951: The Kid from Amarillo .... Rakim
- 1953: Sangaree .... River Pirate (uncredited)
- 1954: Prince Valiant .... Sir Lancelot (uncredited)
- 1955: Davy Crockett, King of the Wild Frontier .... William Travis
- 1955: To Catch a Thief .... Detective at Costume Ball (uncredited)
- 1955: A Lawless Street .... Dooley Brion
- 1956: Anything Goes .... Henri (uncredited)
- 1956: The Creature Walks Among Us .... Gill-man on land (uncredited)
- 1956: The Great Locomotive Chase .... Marion A. Ross
- 1956: The Werewolf .... Sheriff Jack Haines
- 1956: The Loretta Young Show S4Ep12 "The End of the Week" .... Hank Curtis
- 1956: Gun the Man Down .... Ralph Farley
- 1957: The Delicate Delinquent .... Policeman (uncredited)
- 1957: Hell Canyon Outlaws .... Henchman Walt
- 1957: The Story of Mankind .... Early Man
- 1958: Snowfire .... Mike McGowan
- 1958: The Man Who Died Twice .... T. J. Brennan
- 1958: A Lust to Kill .... Cheney Holland
- 1958: Money, Women and Guns .... John Briggs
- 1958: The Buccaneer .... Pirate with Axe (uncredited)
- 1958: Tales of Frankenstein (TV Short) .... The Monster
- 1958: Cheyenne.... Gregg Dewey in Episode "Dead to Rights"
- 1959 The Life and Legend of Wyatt Earp ... Tom Tanner in Episode "The Actress"
- 1959: The Jayhawkers! .... China
- 1959: Have Gun - Will Travel ... Huston in Episode "First, Catch a Tiger"
- 1959: Bonanza .... John C. Regan in Episode "The Magnificent Adah"
- 1960: Road of the Giants / La strada dei giganti .... Clint Farrell
- 1961: Guns of the Black Witch .... Jean
- 1961: Cheyenne.... Sheriff Tom Grant
- 1962: The Creation of the Humanoids .... Capt. Kenneth Cragis
- 1962: The Beachcomber (TV Series) .... Capt.Huckabee
- 1963: For Love or Money .... Gregor Garrison
- 1966: Tarzan and the Valley of Gold .... Mr. Train
- 1967: Border Lust
- 1968: The Devil's Brigade .... Luke Pehelan
- 1968: If He Hollers, Let Him Go! .... Officer
- 1974: Scream of the Wolf (TV Movie) .... Grant
- 1974: Blazing Saddles .... Gum Chewer
- 1974: Melvin Purvis: G-Man (TV Movie) .... Hamburger Stand Man
- 1974: Truck Turner .... Garrity
- 1975: The Kansas City Massacre (TV Movie) .... Boss Stringer
- 1977: The Great Gundown .... Baldy
- 1979: Mrs. R's Daughter (TV Movie) .... Larsen (final film role)

== Sources ==
- The American Film Institute catalog of motion pictures ..., Numbers 1941–1950 by American Film Institute
- Science Fiction Stars and Horror Heroes: Interviews with Actors, Directors ... by Tom Weaver
