= Bruce Mozert =

American photographer

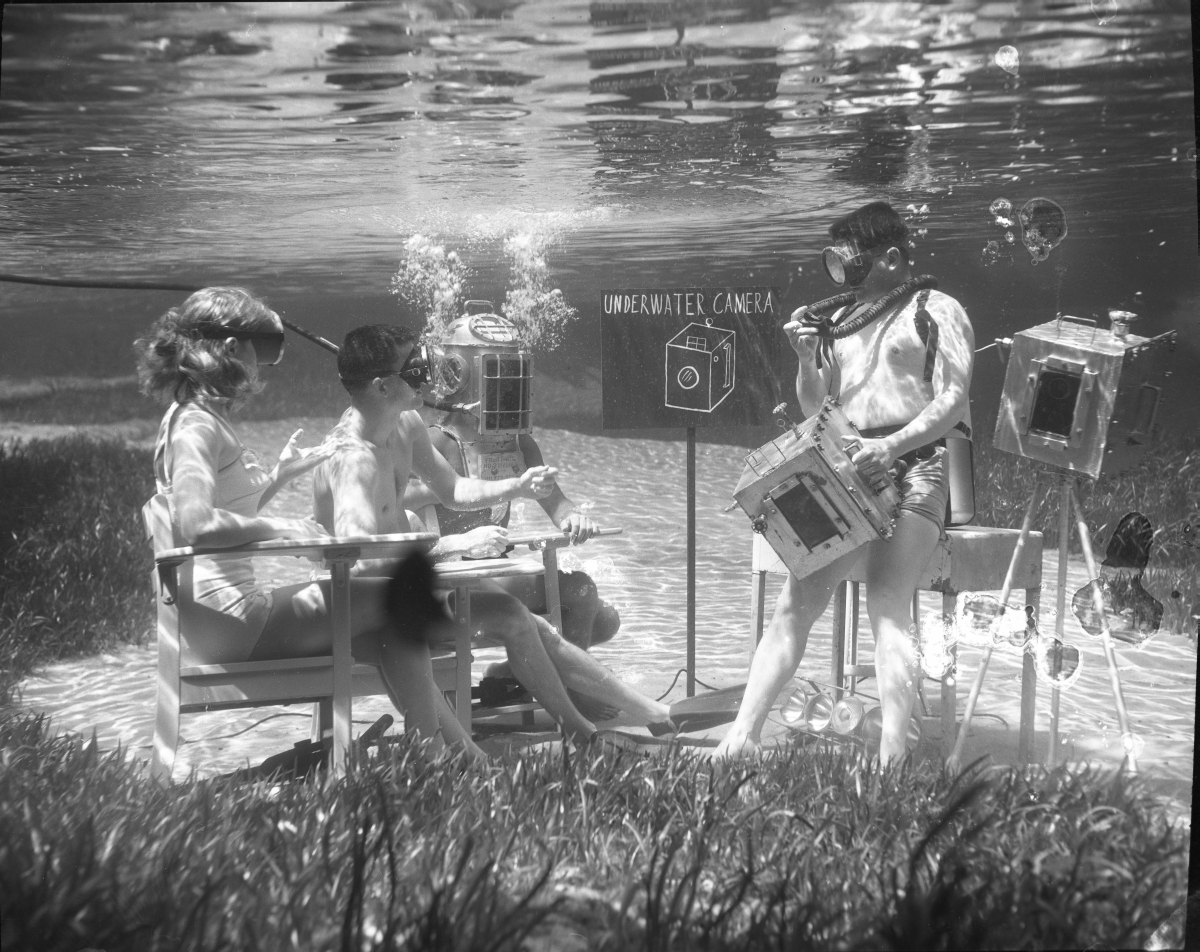
- Bruce Mozert teaching underwater camera training school at Silver Springs.
- Born: Robert Bruce Moser; November 24, 1916; Newark, Ohio, U.S.
- Died: October 14, 2015 (aged 98); Ocala, Florida, U.S.
- Known for: Underwater photography

Robert Bruce Moser (November 24, 1916 – October 14, 2015), known as Bruce Mozert, was an American photographer. He was considered to be a pioneer of underwater photography and his images of Silver Springs, Florida, were widely circulated during the early and mid 20th century.

== Early life ==
Mozert was born in Newark, Ohio, to Fred and Jessie Moser. He was the youngest of three children and the only son. The family moved to a farm in Scranton, Pennsylvania, while he was still young, where his father became the superintendent of the Scranton Stove Works. He graduated high school and took a job as a truck driver that brought coal to New Jersey, but quickly decided he was "too sensitive to be a truck driver" and moved to New York City to live with his sister, the well-known model and pin-up artist Zoë Mozert. Through Zoë, Bruce met Victor de Palma, a lead photographer for Life magazine, who hired him as a film developer and helped him into the field. He joined the Freelance Photographers Guild and worked for Pic.

== Career ==
In 1938, while he was on an assignment to photograph women's shoes in Miami, Florida, Mozert heard about the filming of one of Johnny Weissmuller's Tarzan movies in Silver Springs. He traveled to meet the cast and ended up staying in Ocala, becoming the official photographer of Silver Springs for the next 45 years. He served in the U.S. Army Air Forces during part of World War II and there learned aerial photography.

Mozert took advantage of the extremely clear water of Silver Springs by taking underwater photographs with specially constructed waterproof camera housings. He built his first such housing in the early 1940s. The novelty and clarity of his underwater photographs were major advertisements for Silver Springs and the distribution of the photos over wire services helped the attraction bring in visitors from 1940 to 1970.

Most of his photographs feature submerged women doing tasks that would ordinarily be done on land, such as cooking, reading newspapers and mowing lawns. Most of the women were actually employees of Silver Springs and one of his most frequently shot models, Ginger Stanley, was an underwater stunt double for Creature from the Black Lagoon. Physical tricks were often used to make the underwater scenes appear more realistic. He also took underwater movie stills for the many productions filmed in Silver Springs. Above the water, he took pictures of visitors going on glass bottom boat tours, developed the film while they were on the tour, and then had the photos ready to sell to visitors when they returned.

Mozert spent his last years working out of his studio in Ocala, Florida, where he digitized film. His pictures have been featured in publications such as Huffington Post, National Geographic, Life, Look, Pic and Smithsonian Magazine.

Mozert died at his home in Ocala on October 14, 2015, at the age of 98.
