= Ginger Stanley =

American model, actress and stunt woman (1931–2023)

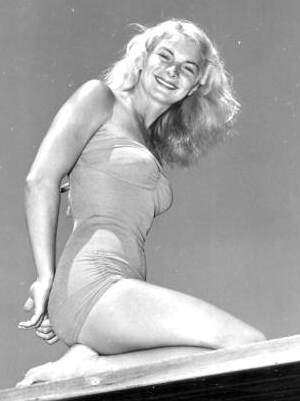
- Ginger Stanley, Weeki Wachee Springs, Florida 1951
- Born: December 19, 1931; Sandersville, Georgia, U.S.
- Died: January 19, 2023 (aged 91); Orlando, Florida, U.S.
- Other name: Ginger Hallowell
- Occupations: Stunt woman; Actress; Model
- Spouse: Albert V. Hallowell Jr. (m. 1956; died 1987)
- Children: 3

Ginger Stanley (December 19, 1931 – January 19, 2023) was an American stuntwoman, model and bit-part actress.

Stanley was best known for her stunt work in the horror films Creature from the Black Lagoon (1954), swimming as a double for lead actress Julie Adams, and the movie's sequel, Revenge of the Creature (1955), swimming as a double for lead actress Lori Nelson.

== Biography ==
Stanley was born in Sandersville, Georgia, on December 19, 1931. She left her home in Walhalla, South Carolina, at the age of 15 and moved to Sebring, Florida, to live with her older sister. While competing in a festival in Leesburg, Florida, she met Newt Perry, a swimming coach, promoter, and consultant for movies that used underwater scenes. He hired her to be a professional mermaid at the Weeki Wachee Springs tourist attraction. She worked there for 2 1/2 years.

From 1953 to 1956, Stanley worked at Silver Springs as a swimmer and underwater performer with Bruce Mozert, a pioneer of underwater photography, becoming one of his "most recognized" models. At this time, she also had her two roles in the Creature from the Black Lagoon and Revenge of the Creature, filmed at Wakulla Springs and Silver Springs, respectively.

Stanley was also the body double for Esther Williams in Jupiter's Darling (1955). At the time, Williams was recovering from a perforated eardrum and her time underwater was limited.

In 1956, Stanley married Albert V. Hallowell Jr. and they moved to Orlando, Florida. They had three daughters. She hosted "Browsing with Ginger", a women's talk show on a local Orlando television station, and then spent twenty-three years as a runway model, working for various charities, department stores, and Walt Disney World. Her husband died of heart disease in 1987.

In 2012, she was inducted into the Mermaid Hall of Fame at Weeki Wachee Springs.

As an actress, she had uncredited roles in four movies.

Stanley also appeared as herself in the documentaries, Creature Feature: 50 Years of the Gill-Man (2004) and Creature Feature: 60 Years of the Gill-Man (2014), about the filming and marketing of the horror film, Creature From the Black Lagoon.

Stanley died in Orlando, Florida, on January 19, 2023, at the age of 91.

== Films ==
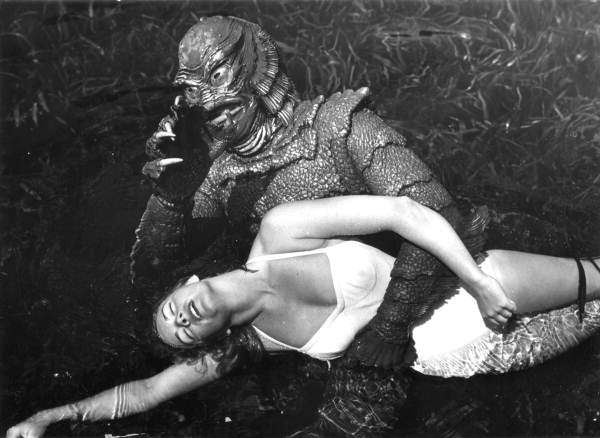
Ginger Stanley in the grip of the Gill-Man

=== Stuntwoman ===
- Creature from the Black Lagoon (1954) (uncredited)
- Jupiter's Darling (1955) (uncredited)
- Revenge of the Creature (1955) (uncredited)

=== Actress ===
- Distant Drums (1951) Woman (uncredited)
- The Meal (1975) Dinner Guest (uncredited)
- Splash, Too (TV Movie) (1988) Tourist (uncredited)
- Passenger 57 (1992) Plane Passenger (uncredited)

=== Herself ===
- Creature Feature: 50 Years of the Gill-Man (Video documentary) (2004)
- Creature Feature: 60 Years of the Gill-Man (Documentary) (2014)

== See also ==
- Gill-man
- "Bruce Mozert's historic photos on exhibit at Appleton Museum". Ocala.com. Ocala Star-Banner. A photo by Bruce Mozert of Ginger Stanley gardening underwater while a man pushes a lawn mover.
