= The Creature Walks Among Us =

1956 film by John Sherwood

- Theatrical release poster
- Directed by: John Sherwood
- Written by: Arthur A. Ross
- Based on: "The Creature of Man" (treatment) by Arthur A. Ross
- Produced by: William Alland
- Starring: Jeff Morrow; Rex Reason; Leigh Snowden; Gregg Palmer; Maurice Manson; Ricou Browning; Don Megowan
- Cinematography: Maury Gertsman
- Edited by: Edward Curtiss
- Music by: Irving Gertz; Heinz Roemheld; Henry Mancini
- Production company: Universal Pictures
- Distributed by: Universal Pictures
- Release date: March 1956
- Running time: 78 minutes
- Country: United States
- Language: English
- Box office: $1,000,000

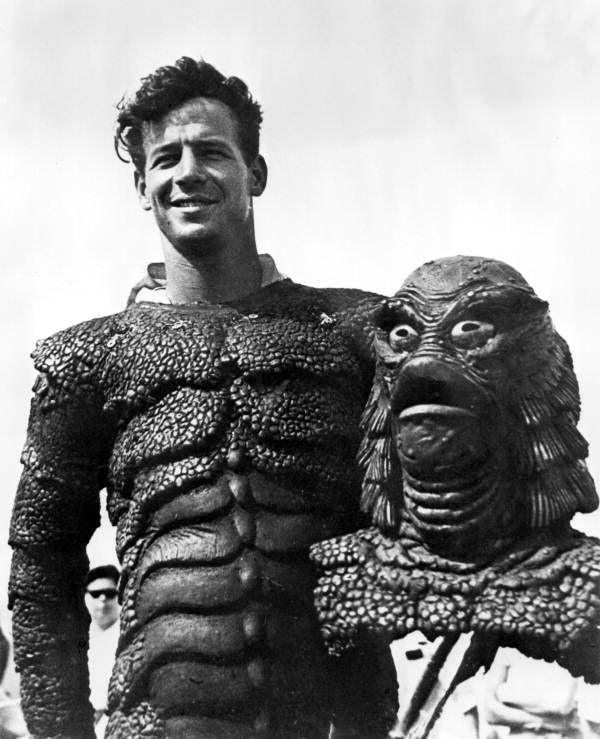
Ricou Browning played the "Gill Man" in the underwater scenes of Creature from the Black Lagoon (1954), Revenge of the Creature (1955), and The Creature Walks Among Us (1956).

The Creature Walks Among Us is a 1956 American monster horror film and the third and final installment of the Creature from the Black Lagoon trilogy from Universal Pictures, following the previous year's Revenge of the Creature. The film was directed by John Sherwood, the long-time Universal-International assistant director, in his directorial debut. His role as director was partly facilitated by Jack Arnold, who had directed the first two films in the series, who recommended Sherwood to Universal.

The Creature Walks Among Us stars Jeff Morrow, Rex Reason, Leigh Snowden, Gregg Palmer, and Maurice Manson. The titular Creature, or Gill-man, is played by Don Megowan on land and Ricou Browning underwater. The film's plot follows a cold-hearted scientist (Morrow) who surgically transforms the Gill-man into a more human-like, terrestrial organism. As with the original Creature from the Black Lagoon, the film's score was composed by Henry Mancini, who at the time was under contract with Universal.

The Creature Walks Among Us is the final film in the Creature from the Black Lagoon trilogy, and is often cited as the final film of the classic Universal Monsters era.

== Plot ==
Following the Gill-man's escape from Ocean Harbor Oceanarium in Florida, a team of scientists led by the deranged and cold-hearted Dr. William Barton board the Vagabondia III to capture the creature in the Everglades. Barton is mentally unstable and apparently an abusive husband to his wife Marcia, as he becomes very jealous and paranoid when Marcia is with other men. Their guide Jed Grant makes numerous passes at Marcia (which she constantly rebuffs), with Barton becoming paranoid about the two.

Marcia accompanies Grant and Dr. Thomas Morgan on their initial dive to look for the Gill-man, despite her husband's fierce objections. During the dive, Marcia swims too deep and is overcome with "raptures of the deep", temporarily losing her mind and removing all her scuba gear. This forces Grant and Morgan to abandon their hunt for the Gill-man to swim back and save her.

When he is eventually captured, the Gill-man is badly burned in a fire leading to a surgical transformation performed by Barton, Morgan and their colleagues Dr. Borg and Dr. Johnson. While bandaging the Gill-man, the doctors notice that he is shedding his gills and even breathing using a kind of lung system. Now that the creature has more human-like skin, he is given clothing. The doctors attempt to get the Gill-man used to living among humans. Although his life is saved, he is apparently unhappy, staring despondently at the ocean.

Barton ruins the plans when, in a murderous rage, he kills Grant, jealous that he had made romantic advances towards his wife. Realizing what he has done, Barton then tries to put the blame on the Gill-man. The Gill-man, witnessing the killing, and apparently realizing that he is being framed for Grant's murder, goes on a rampage. After ripping down the confining electric fence, he kills Barton and then slowly walks back to the sea. He is last seen on a beach, advancing towards the ocean.

== Cast ==
- Jeff Morrow as Dr. William Barton
- Rex Reason as Dr. Thomas Morgan
- Leigh Snowden as Marcia Barton
- Gregg Palmer as Jed Grant
- Maurice Manson as Dr. Borg
- Ricou Browning as Gill-man – in water
  - Don Megowan as Gill-man – on land
- James Rawley as Dr. Johnson
- Paul Fierro as Morteno
- Lillian Molieri as Mrs. Morteno
- David McMahon as Captain Stanley

== Production ==
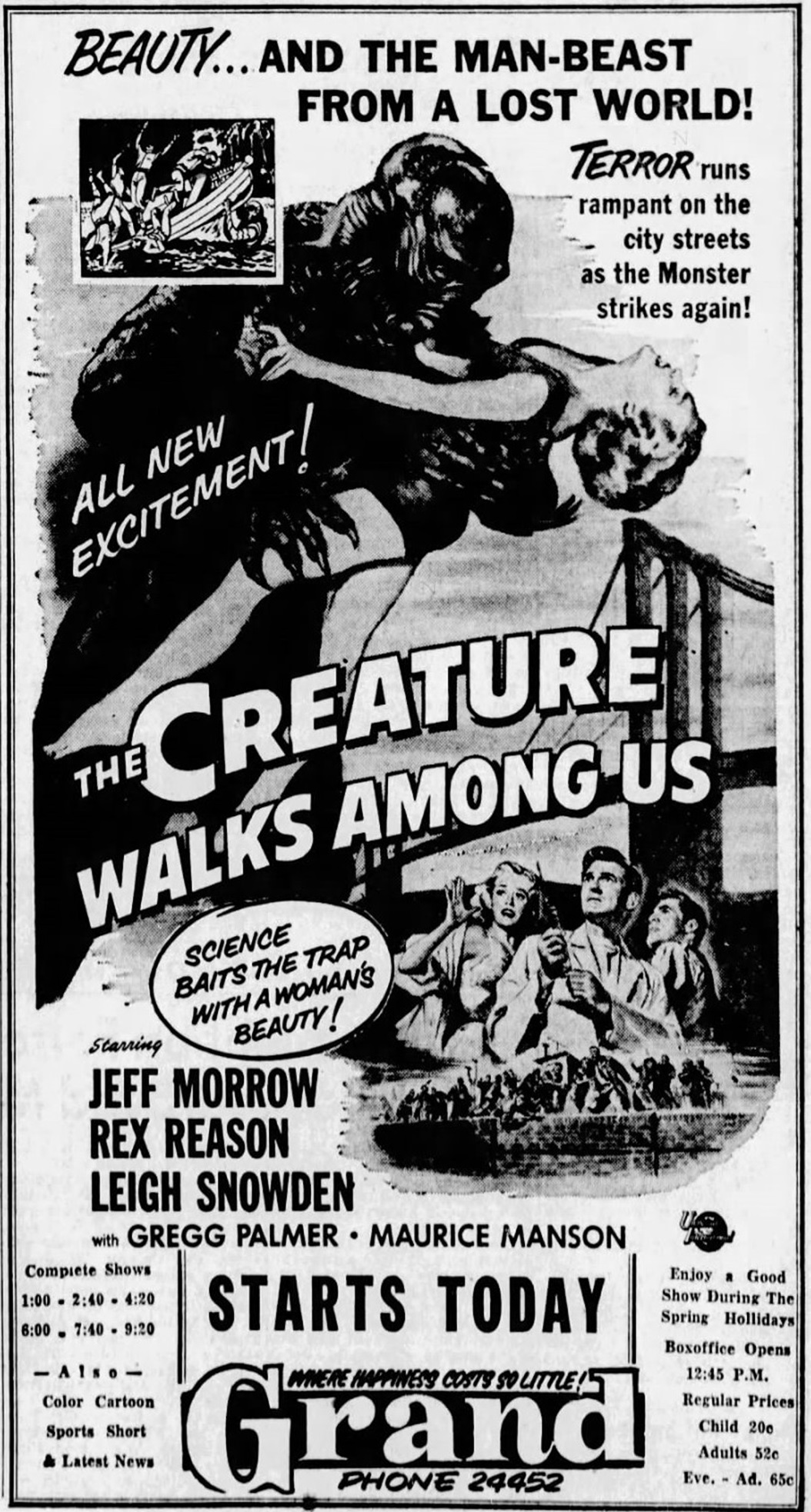
Theatre advertisement from 1956

Unlike the previous two Creature films, The Creature Walks Among Us was not filmed in 3-D. The underwater scenes were filmed at Wakulla Springs in North Florida, today a state park. Other locations in Florida were also used for location shooting. Principal photography ran from late August to mid-September 1955.

== Reception ==
Bosley Crowther of The New York Times reviewed The Creature Walks Among Us as a return to the "merman" series: "The producers have captured some misty but pictorial underwater footage and that the Messrs. Morrow and Reason, and Gregg Palmer, who plays a guide with a yen for the blonde and statuesque Miss Snowden, behave fairly well in decidedly unusual circumstances. The "creature", of course, is frightening enough to scare the scales off a tarpon. However, he apparently hasn't terrified his Hollywood discoverers".

== Home media ==
Universal Studios released The Creature Walks Among Us on DVD in a boxed set along with Creature from the Black Lagoon and Revenge of the Creature, and added a bonus behind-the-scenes documentary on the famous trilogy. The DVD audio commentators are Tom Weaver, later the author of the book The Creature Chronicles, and Bob Burns. In 2018, Universal Studios released a boxed set of all three films on Blu-ray.

== See also ==
- List of American films of 1956
