= The Beachcomber (TV series) =

British television series

- Also known as: Mystery Adventure: The Beachcomber
- Genre: Adventure fiction
- Created by: Walter Newman
- Written by: Robert Sabaroff
- Starring: Cameron Mitchell; Don Megowan; Sebastian Cabot; Santy Josol
- Country of origin: United States
- Original language: English
- No. of seasons: 1
- No. of episodes: 39 (list of episodes)

Production
- Executive producer: Robert Stambler
- Producer: Nat Perrin
- Running time: 30 minutes
- Production company: Everglade Productions

Original release
- Network: Syndication
- Release: 20 February – 13 November 1962

The Beachcomber is a Filmmasters/ITC Entertainment adventure TV series which ran for one series of 39 episodes in 1961.

== Plot ==
John Lackland, a rich advertising executive from San Francisco, retires from the rat race to become a beachcomber on the island of Amura in the South Pacific. While Lackland "searches for the true meaning of life" he helps people who are in difficult situations.

Captain Huckabee is Lackland's friend, and Tarmu is Lackland's houseboy. Andrew Crippen is commissioner of Amura, and the Reverend Snow is the priest there. Kallea and Alfy are other friends of Lackland, and Alfy is a bartender.

== Main cast ==
- Cameron Mitchell as John Lackland
- Don Megowan as Captain Huckabee
- Sebastian Cabot as Commissioner Andrew Crippen
- Bill Hess as Alfy
- George Mitchell as the Reverend Snow
- Joan Staley as Linda
- Jerry Summers as Tarmu
- Stan Josol as Kallea

Guest stars in the series included Adam West, Frank Silvera and Cesar Romero

== Episode list ==
1. The Brooch
2. The Shark Affair
3. Pat Hand
4. The Hijackers
5. Forbidden Island
6. The Chase
7. Captain Huckabee's Beard
8. The Taming of Andrew
9. Death Do Us Part
10. The Larcenous Lover
11. Girl in Hiding
12. Honor Bound
13. Tambu
14. The Black Pearl
15. Charlie Six Kids
16. Empty Village
17. The Floating Fortune
18. Honest Larceny
19. Neilani
20. Mr. Winters
21. Rongorongo Man
22. The Day of the Whale
23. The Fugitive
24. The Mask of Talugi
25. Home to Roost
26. Devil in Paradise
27. The Reward
28. Tribal Law
29. Flight to Freedom
30. Long Live the Sultan
31. The Prodigal Pretender
32. The Spaniard
33. Man with a Guitar
34. The Ransom
35. The Search for Robert Herrick
36. The Two-Sided Triangle
37. A Rooster Named Red
38. Roll of Thunder
39. Paradise Lost

== Production ==
Beachcomber was filmed on location in Winter Park, Florida.
