= Milicent Patrick =

American special effects designer and animator (1915–1998)

- Patrick with the head of the Gill-man from Creature from the Black Lagoon.
- Born: Mildred Elizabeth Fulvia di Rossi; November 11, 1915; El Paso, Texas, United States
- Died: February 24, 1998 (aged 82); Roseville, California, United States
- Occupations: Actress; makeup designer; special effects artist; animator
- Spouses: Paul Fitzpatrick (m. 1945; div. 1947); Syd Beaumont (m. 1952; died 1954); Lee Trent (m. 1963; div. 1969)

Milicent Patrick (born Mildred Elizabeth Fulvia di Rossi; November 11, 1915 – February 24, 1998) was an American actress, makeup designer, special effects artist, and animator.

Born in El Paso, Texas, Patrick spent much of her early life in California, most notably in San Simeon, as her father, Camille Charles Rossi, was superintendent of construction at Hearst Castle. In 1939, Patrick began working for Walt Disney Productions and became one of the studio's first female animators. Patrick continued her career at Universal Studios and is cited as being the first woman to work in a special effects and makeup department. She is best known for being the creator of the head costume for the iconic Gill-man from the film Creature from the Black Lagoon (1954).

== Early life ==
Mildred Elizabeth Fulvia di Rossi was born on November 11, 1915, in El Paso, Texas, the second of three children of Camille Charles Rossi and Elisa Albertine Bill. Her father was superintendent of construction at Hearst Castle, working under Julia Morgan, the first licensed female architect in the state of California. When Mildred was six, her family relocated from San Francisco to San Simeon, California. During her childhood, Mildred grew close with William Hearst's wife, Millicent Hearst, who would become the namesake for Mildred's latter name change. In 1932, Morgan and Camille Rossi's contentious working relationship caused Morgan to appeal to Hearst that Rossi be removed from the project, uprooting the Rossi family from the grounds at Hearst Castle.

The Rossi family then moved to Glendale, California, where she began attending Glendale Junior College. There, she was the assistant art editor for the school's yearbook department. In 1935, she produced six illustrations of various student activities including the campus layout, school dances, and sports games. She left that same year without graduating. She went on to study at Chouniard Art Institute for three years, where she focused on illustration and drawing, receiving three scholarships based on her talent.

== Career ==
Patrick began working at Walt Disney Productions in 1939 in their all-female ink and paint department. By 1940, she was moved to the Animation and Effects department, where she became one of the first female animators at Disney. Her work was featured in four sequences in the film Fantasia (1940), including animating the villain Chernabog in the final segment "Night on Bald Mountain". For the segment, Swiss artist Albert Hurter had been hired to create inspirational pencil sketches. Kay Nielsen, a Danish-born illustrator, then developed several color pastel drawings based on Hurter's drawings. The art design was known as the Pastel Effect, in which artists diluted the color paint to have the artwork resemble a chunk of chalky pastel. She next worked as an inbetweener on the film Dumbo (1941) and appeared uncredited in The Reluctant Dragon (1941). Around the same time, Patrick (referred to as "Mildred Rossi") was profiled in the magazine Glamour.

Meanwhile, several Disney animators walked out on strike demanding increased pay, better working conditions, and on-screen credit for their work. The strike ended on September 21, 1941, when Disney signed a unionized contract with the Screen Cartoonist's Guild. By then, on September 12, Patrick had left Disney after privately suffering from migraine headaches.

After leaving Disney, she began modeling in trade shows and as a promotional model. In 1947, while waiting outside the Ambassador Hotel near a bus stop, she met William Hawks, the brother of Howard Hawks, who became her talent agent. Her first film as an extra was Texas, Brooklyn & Heaven (1948).

In 1952, Patrick began working at Universal Studios' makeup department after showing Bud Westmore some of her sketches while filming The World in His Arms (1952). She became the first woman to work in a special effects makeup department and was credited with designing the pirate faces in Against All Flags (1952), the makeup of Jack Palance in Sign of the Pagan (1954), the alien in It Came From Outer Space (1953), Mr. Hyde in Abbott and Costello Meet Dr. Jekyll and Mr. Hyde (1953), the Metaluna mutant in This Island Earth (1955), and was a mask maker for The Mole People (1956).

In 1953, Westmore received a phone call from producer William Alland who had learned of a mythical half-fish, half-human creature that resided near the Amazon River from cinematographer Gabriel Figueroa. He envisioned a feature film that would involve the creature and asked if Westmore's department could produce the design. Westmore assured him of the task and first approached artist Chris Mueller to create some designs, but soon remembered Patrick's designs on It Came From Outer Space (1953). Patrick was hired to create the design but given certain limits to have the creature appear fearsome and unearthly, able to swim well, and have pulsating gills.

For the Gill-man, Patrick took inspiration from researching prehistoric reptiles, amphibians, and fish, as well as animals from the Devonian period. The film went into production in September 1953 under the working title The Sea Monster. By November 1953, the film was retitled Creature from the Black Lagoon (1954). During promotion for the film, Patrick was sent on a press tour, dubbed "The Beauty Who Created the Beast", to discuss the creation of the creature. This was quickly changed by Westmore to "The Beauty Who Lives With the Beast", to avoid citing Patrick as the creator of the Gill-man. When she returned to Los Angeles, Patrick was informed that she no longer worked for Universal Studios, having been let go due to Westmore's jealousy over Patrick being associated with the creation of the Gill-man.

After leaving Universal, Patrick never worked on another film production and returned to small acting roles. The creation of the Gill-man was credited to Westmore, until the documentary film Back to the Black Lagoon included on the Classic Monster Collection DVD revealed Patrick to be the designer. Earlier, in 1978, Robert Skotak renewed interest in Patrick's career after publishing an article documenting her creature design work in the Famous Monsters of Filmland magazine. Her Gill-man work was also explored in a 2011 Tor.com article by Vincent Di Fate.

== Personal life ==
Mildred Rossi met her first husband, Paul Fitzpatrick, while working at the Disney studios. Fitzpatrick was married, and they began an affair that was discovered by Fitzpatrick's wife, who later died by suicide when Fitzpatrick refused to stop seeing Rossi. They married in 1945, resulting in Mildred's estrangement from her family, and changing her name to Mil Fitzpatrick. When they divorced, she changed her name again to Mil Patrick.

In 1948, Patrick changed her name again to her most recognized name, Milicent Patrick. Patrick then had a relationship with voice actor Frank L. Graham in 1950. On September 2, Graham was found dead inside his convertible in the garage holding a photograph of Patrick by his side. His death was later ruled as suicide from carbon monoxide poisoning. She married again to Syd Beaumont, who died of cancer in 1954.

In 1955, Patrick met Lee Trent, the voice actor for The Lone Ranger radio program during its first three and a half years. After a tumultuous relationship marked by canceled engagements, Patrick married Trent in a Las Vegas chapel wedding on December 29, 1963. They filed for divorce in January 1969, but continued to have an on-off relationship for years.

Patrick developed Parkinson's disease in 1988 and later breast cancer. She died on February 24, 1998, at a hospice care center in Roseville, California.

== Filmography ==
=== Film ===
Year	Title	Animator	Actress	Costume designer	Makeup designer	Notes
1940	Fantasia	Yes	No	No	No	Uncredited
1941	Dumbo	Yes	No	No	No	Uncredited
1941	The Reluctant Dragon	No	Yes	No	No	Appeared as herself (uncredited)
1948	Texas, Brooklyn and Heaven	No	Yes	No	No	Appeared as Water Nymph (uncredited)
1948	A Song Is Born	No	Yes	No	No	Woman at Dorsey Club (uncredited)
1948	Thunder in the Pines	No	Yes	No	No	The Lady In Black (uncredited)
1949	Bride of Vengeance	No	Yes	No	No	
1951	Varieties on Parade	No	Yes	No	No	Ticket Girl (uncredited)
1951	Westward the Women	No	Yes	No	No	Flashy Woman (uncredited)
1952	Mara Maru	No	Yes	No	No	Extra (uncredited)
1952	Scarlet Angel	No	Yes	No	No	Dolly (uncredited)
1952	The World in His Arms	No	Yes	No	No	Lena (uncredited)
1952	We're Not Married!	No	Yes	No	No	Governor's Secretary (uncredited)
1952	Limelight	No	Yes	No	No	Extra (uncredited)
1952	Abbott and Costello Meet Captain Kidd	No	Yes	No	No	Tavern Wench (uncredited)
1952	Against All Flags	No	No	No	Yes	Uncredited
1953	It Came from Outer Space	No	No	Yes	No	Xenomorph Design (uncredited)
1953	Abbott and Costello Meet Dr. Jekyll and Mr. Hyde	No	No	No	Yes	
1954	The Creature from the Black Lagoon	No	No	Yes	Yes	Designed the Gill-man creature (uncredited)
1954	Sign of the Pagan	No	No	No	Yes	
1955	This Island Earth	No	No	Yes	No	Uncredited
1955	Man Without a Star	No	Yes	No	No	Appeared as Boxcar Alice (uncredited)
1956	The Women of Pitcairn Island	No	Yes	No	No	Island Woman (uncredited)
1956	He Laughed Last	No	Yes	No	No	Eagle's Secretary (uncredited)
1956	Lust for Life	No	Yes	No	No	Julie (uncredited)

=== Television ===
Year	Title	Role	Notes
1952	The Roy Rogers Show	Elena	Episode: "Ride of the Ranchers"
1953	Ramar of the Jungle	The White Goddess	Episodes: "Tribal Feud", "White Savages" & "Evil Trek"
1955	It's a Great Life	Waitress / Salesgirl	Episodes: "Call Michigan 4099" & "Three Hungry Men"
1958	The Restless Gun	Rosita	Episode: "Hornitas Town"
1959	Westinghouse Desilu Playhouse	Senora Alvarez	Episode: "The Killer Instinct"
1960	Lawman	Mary Beyer	Episode: "The Surface of Truth"
1961	Laramie	Rose	Episode: "The Jailbreakers"

== Bibliography ==
- O'Meara, Mallory (2019). The Lady from the Black Lagoon: Hollywood Monsters and the Lost Legacy of Milicent Patrick. Toronto: Hanover Square Press. ISBN 978-1-335-93780-3. OCLC 1080884379.
- Weaver, Tom; Schecter, David; Kronenberg, Steve (2014). The Creature Chronicles: Exploring the Black Lagoon Trilogy. North Carolina: McFarland. ISBN 978-1-476-61580-6.
