= Jack Arnold (director) =

American film director (1912–1992)

- Arnold in 1957
- Born: John Arnold Waks; October 14, 1912; New Haven, Connecticut, U.S.
- Died: March 17, 1992 (aged 79); Woodland Hills, Los Angeles, California, U.S.
- Occupation: Director
- Known for: Science fiction films, documentaries
- Spouse: Betty Arnold (m. circa 1945)
- Children: 2, including Susan

Jack Arnold (born John Arnold Waks, October 14, 1912 – March 17, 1992) was an American film and television director. Considered one of the leading filmmakers of 1950s science fiction films, his most notable films are It Came from Outer Space (1953), Creature from the Black Lagoon (1954), Tarantula (1955), and The Incredible Shrinking Man (1957).

== Early years ==
Arnold, who was Jewish, was born in New Haven, Connecticut, to immigrants: his father Matthew F. Waks (1890–1965) was born in Rivne (now in Ukraine), and his mother Edith Waks (née Pagowitz, 1897–1950) was born in Łomża (now in Poland). As a child, he read a lot of science fiction, which laid the foundations for his genre films of the 1950s.

He hoped to become a professional actor, and in his late teens he enrolled in the American Academy of Dramatic Arts, where his classmates included Hume Cronyn, Betty Field and Garson Kanin. After graduating he worked as a vaudeville dancer and, in 1935, began getting roles in Broadway plays. He was acting in My Sister Eileen when the Japanese attacked Pearl Harbor, and he immediately enlisted as a cadet for pilot training.

While Arnold intended to become a pilot, a shortage of planes meant he was temporarily placed in the U.S. Army Signal Corps, where he took a crash course in cinematography. He then became a cameraman and learned the techniques of filmmaking by assisting Robert Flaherty on various military films. After eight months with Flaherty, he became a pilot in the Air Corps. While stationed at Truax Airfield at New Rochelle, New York, he met Betty, who would later become his wife.

== Career ==
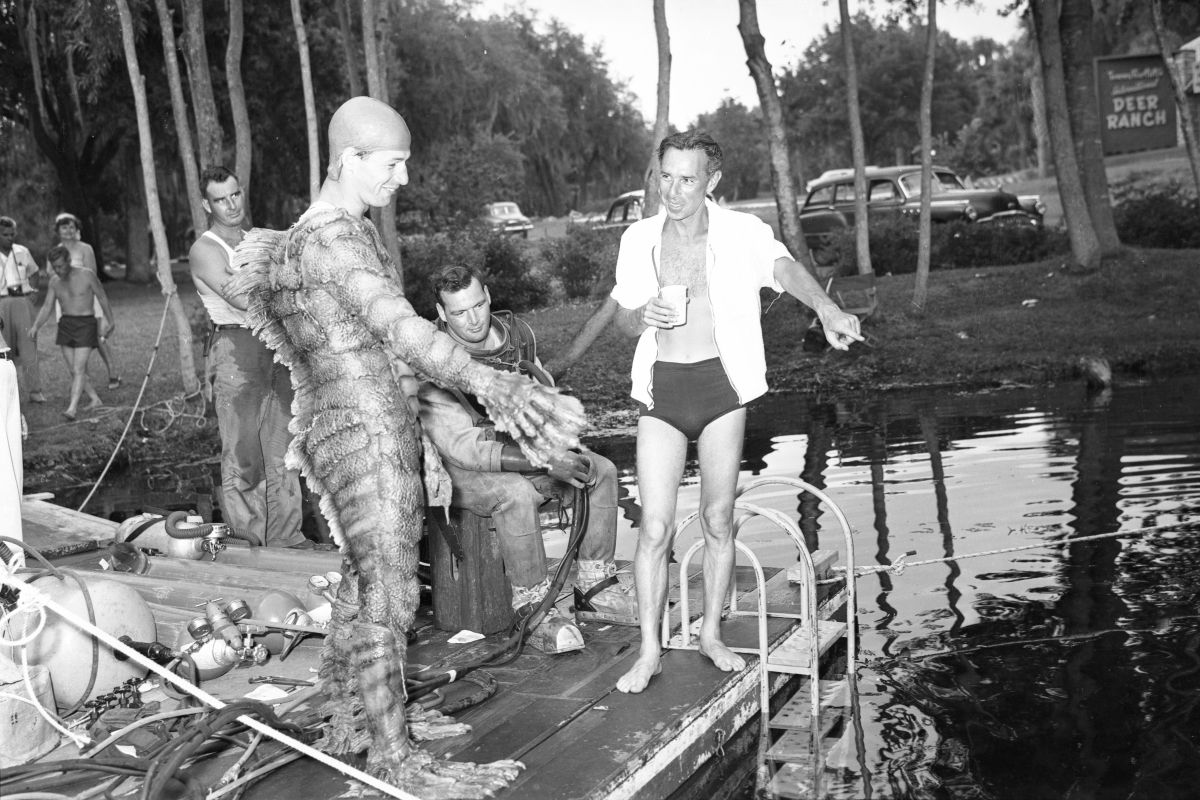
Arnold (right) and Ricou Browning with crew on the set of 1955's Revenge of the Creature

Following the end of World War II and the end of Arnold's term of service, he formed a partnership with an air squadron buddy, Lee Goodman, to form a film production company. Their new company, called Promotional Films Company, made fundraising films for various non-profit organizations. He also continued acting on stage during this period, in plays including a revival of The Front Page, and played opposite Bela Lugosi and Elaine Stritch in Three Indelicate Ladies.

"Jack Arnold dominated the science fiction field during his brief career. No imprint lingers so indelibly on the face of modern fantasy film as that of this obscure yet brilliant artist. All his films, no matter how tawdry, were marked with a brilliant personal vision. He exists as an éminence grise on the horizon of fantasy film, inscrutable, mysterious, almost impossible both to analyse and to ignore."

— John Baxter, filmmaker and author.

By 1950, after his documentary films had received more exposure, he was commissioned to produce and direct With These Hands, a documentary about working conditions of the early 20th century. It was nominated for an Academy Award for Best Documentary Feature.

Arnold directed a number of 1950s science fiction films. The best known of these, It Came from Outer Space (1953), Creature from the Black Lagoon (1954), Tarantula (1955), and The Incredible Shrinking Man (1957) are noted for their atmospheric black-and-white cinematography and sophisticated scripts. The Incredible Shrinking Man is considered his "masterpiece," a fantasy film with few equals in intelligence and sophistication, notes author John Baxter. While all the films display a "sheer virtuosity of style and clarity of vision."

Arnold's main collaborator at Universal Studios was producer William Alland. Revenge of the Creature (1955) was Clint Eastwood's debut film.

Arnold also made some non-sci-fi films, mostly Westerns. His best Western is often considered to be No Name on the Bullet (1959), about a town frightened to hysteria by the arrival of a gunman who never reveals who he is after or why. The film was shot in color and CinemaScope and was later restored from the original negative for airing on the "Grit" digital broadcast channel.

He also worked in England as the director of the influential anti-nuke satire, The Mouse That Roared (1959), in which Peter Sellers played three roles, one of them in drag. His later films included Hello Down There (1969), Black Eye (1974), the British sex comedy The Bunny Caper aka Sex Play (1974), Boss Nigger (1975) and The Swiss Conspiracy (1976).

Arnold began his television career in 1955 with several episodes of Science Fiction Theater. He went on to direct the long-running television series Perry Mason and Peter Gunn. He also directed episodes of such television shows as Nanny and the Professor, Alias Smith and Jones, The Fall Guy, The Brady Bunch, Gilligan's Island, Wonder Woman, Ellery Queen, Mr. Terrific, Mr. Lucky, and The San Pedro Beach Bums, as well as the TV movie Marilyn: The Untold Story (1980).

== Death and legacy ==
Arnold died of arteriosclerosis in Woodland Hills, Los Angeles, California at the age of 79. Later that year, the UCLA Film Archive held a tribute "Jack Arnold: The Incredible Thinking Man" film festival which screened a number of his films. The Archive also produced and screened a bio-documentary about his life, The Incredible Thinking Man.

== Selected filmography ==
- With These Hands (1950)
- It Came from Outer Space (1953)
- The Glass Web (1953)
- Girls in the Night (1953)
- Creature from the Black Lagoon (1954)
- Revenge of the Creature (1955)
- The Man from Bitter Ridge (1955)
- This Island Earth (1955, uncredited)
- Tarantula (1955)
- Outside the Law (1956)
- Red Sundown (1956)
- The Incredible Shrinking Man (1957)
- Man in the Shadow (1957)
- The Tattered Dress (1957)
- The Lady Takes a Flyer (1958)
- High School Confidential! (1958)
- Monster on the Campus (1958)
- The Space Children (1958)
- No Name on the Bullet (1959)
- The Mouse That Roared (1959)
- Bachelor in Paradise (1961)
- The Lively Set (1964)
- A Global Affair (1964)
- Hello Down There (1969)
- Black Eye (1974)
- The Bunny Caper (1974)
- Boss Nigger (1975)
- The Swiss Conspiracy (1976)

== Awards and nominations ==
Year	Result	Award	Category	Film or series
1951	Nominated	Academy Award	Best Documentary, Features	With These Hands Shared with Lee Goodman
1985	Won	Academy of Science Fiction, Fantasy & Horror Films	President's Award	-

== Bibliography ==
- Osteried, Peter: Die Filme von Jack Arnold. MPW, Hille 2012. ISBN 978-3-942621-11-3 (in German)
- Reemes, Dana M.: Directed by Jack Arnold. McFarland & Company, Jefferson 1988. ISBN 0-89950-331-4
- Schnelle, Frank et alii (ed.): Hollywood Professional: Jack Arnold und seine Filme. Fischer-Wiedleroither, Stuttgart 1993. ISBN 3-924098-05-0 (in German)
