= Gregg Palmer =

American actor (1927–2015)

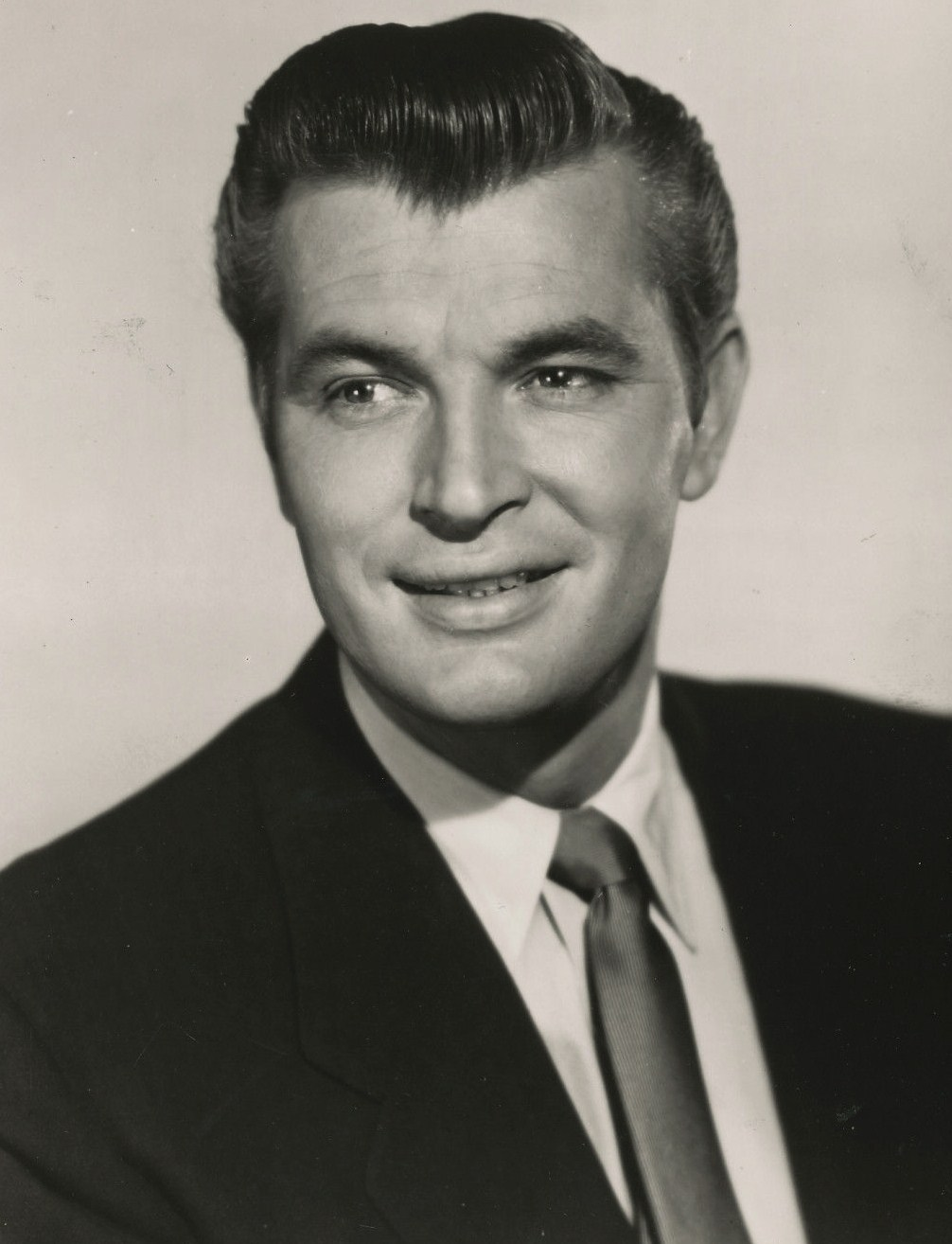
- Palmer in Magnificent Obsession, 1954
- Born: Palmer Edwin Lee; January 25, 1927; San Francisco, California, U.S.
- Died: October 31, 2015 (aged 88); Encino, California, U.S.
- Occupations: Film and television actor
- Years active: 1950–1982
- Spouse: Ruth Stump Brooks (m. 1967; died. 1999)

Palmer Edwin Lee (January 25, 1927 – October 31, 2015), known by his stage name Gregg Palmer, was an American film and television actor. He was best known for playing the recurring role of Tom McLowery in the final season of the American western television series The Life and Legend of Wyatt Earp.

== Life and career ==
Palmer was born in San Francisco, California, He served in the United States Army Air Corps as a cryptographer in World War II. He began his screen career in 1950, with the uncredited role of an ambulance driver in the film My Friend Irma Goes West.

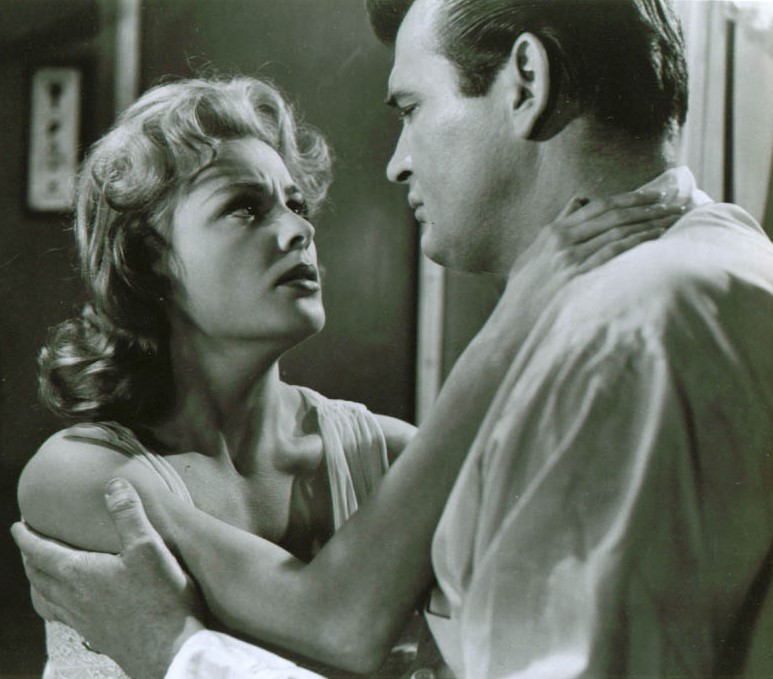
Palmer (right) with Kathleen Crowley in The Rebel Set, 1959

Later in his career, Palmer guest-starred in numerous television programs, including Gunsmoke (1955–1975), Bonanza, Wagon Train, Kolchak: The Night Stalker, The Virginian, The Wild Wild West, Sky King, Have Gun – Will Travel, Rawhide, Star Trek, Mannix, 26 Men, Mission: Impossible and Death Valley Days, and played the recurring role of Tom McLowery in the final season of the ABC western television series The Life and Legend of Wyatt Earp. He also appeared in numerous films such as Big Jake, The Undefeated, Rio Lobo, Magnificent Obsession, Taza, Son of Cochise, To Hell and Back, The Shootist, The Creature Walks Among Us, The Rebel Set, Menace on the Mountain, Zombies of Mora Tau, Taza, Son of Cochise, Francis Goes to West Point and The Creature Walks Among Us.

Palmer retired from acting in 1982, last appearing in the CBS television miniseries The Blue and the Gray.

== Death ==
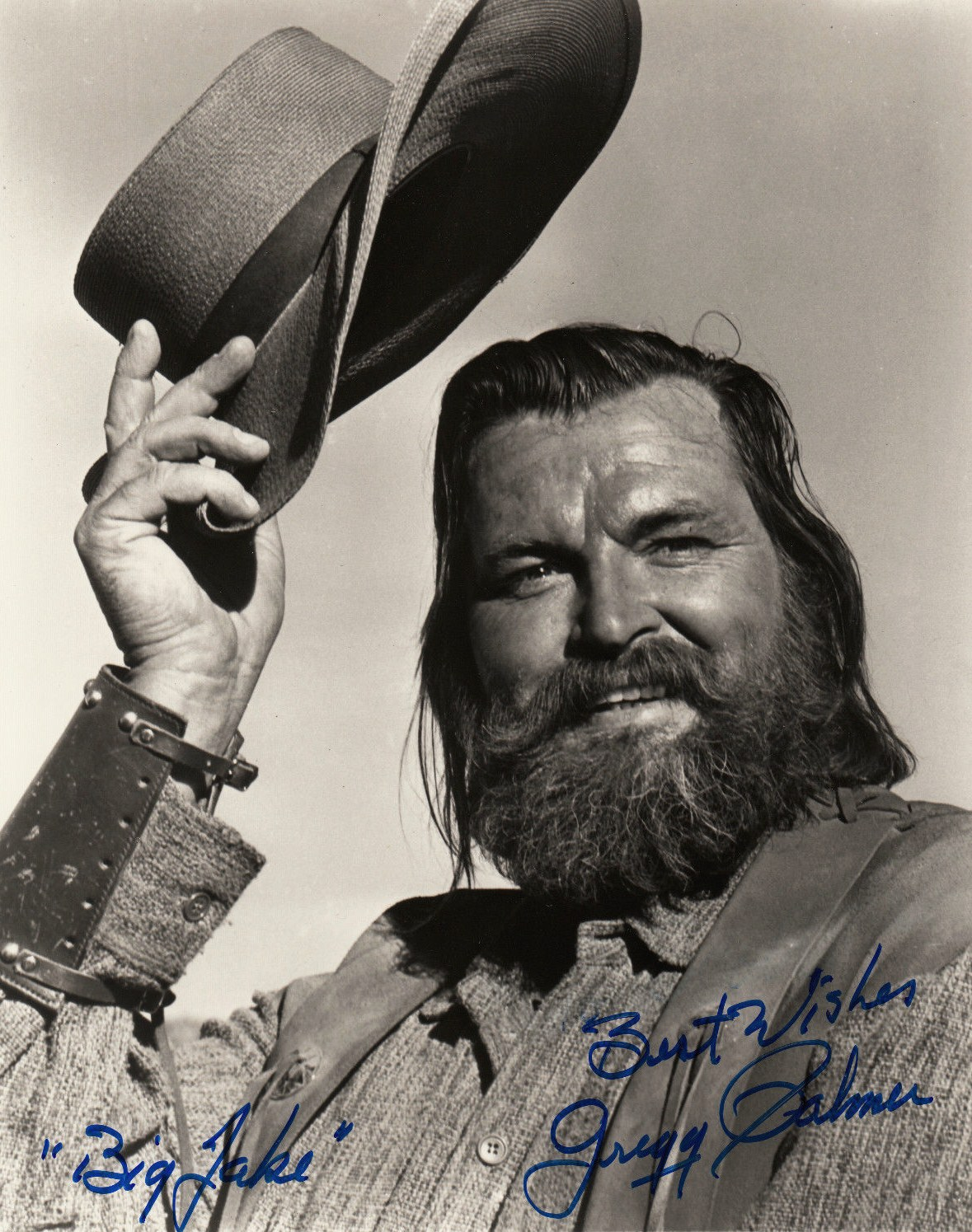
Palmer in Big Jake, 1971

Palmer died on October 31, 2015 in Encino, California, at the age of 88.
