= Gill-man =

The Gill-man
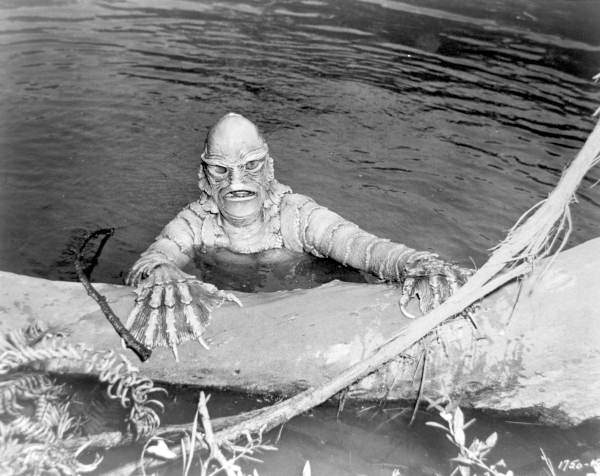
- The Gill-man as portrayed by Ricou Browning in Creature from the Black Lagoon.
- First appearance: Creature from the Black Lagoon
- Last appearance: The Monster Squad
- Created by: Milicent Patrick; Harry Essex; Arthur A. Ross; Maurice Zimm
- Portrayed by: Creature from the Black Lagoon; Ben Chapman; Revenge of the Creature; Tom Hennesy; The Creature Walks Among Us; Don Megowan; All underwater scenes: Ricou Browning

In-universe information
- Type: Devonian "Fish-Man"
- Status: Deceased

The Gill-man, commonly called The Creature from The Black Lagoon, or simply The Creature, is the movie monster of the 1954 black-and-white film Creature from the Black Lagoon and its two sequels Revenge of the Creature (1955) and The Creature Walks Among Us (1956).

In all three films, Ricou Browning portrays the Gill-man when he is swimming underwater. In the scenes when the Gill-man is walking on dry land, Ben Chapman performed the Gill-man in the first film, followed by Tom Hennesy in the second, and Don Megowan in the third.

The Gill-man also appears in the 1967 stop-motion animated film Mad Monster Party?, but is referred to as simply "The Creature". It also appears in the 1972 traditional animated film Mad Mad Mad Monsters, again referred to as simply "The Creature".

The Gill-man's popularity as an iconic monster of cinema has led to numerous cameo appearances, including an episode of The Munsters (1965), Stephen King's It (1986), the motion picture The Monster Squad (1987), a stage show (2009), and a reimagining in 2017's The Shape of Water. Despite this popularity, the Gill-man appeared in the fewest movies of all the Universal Monsters.

== Concept and design ==
Milicent Patrick, adding some final touches to Ricou Browning's underwater Gill-man mask

=== Films ===
Actors portraying Gill-man in film
Film	Year	Gill-man on land	Gill-man underwater	Gill-man stunts
Creature from the Black Lagoon	1954	Ben Chapman	Ricou Browning	Ted White
Revenge of the Creature	1955	Tom Hennesy	Ricou Browning	—N/a
The Creature Walks Among Us	1956	Don Megowan	Ricou Browning	—N/a

=== Origin ===
Producer William Alland was attending a dinner party during the filming of Orson Welles' Citizen Kane (in which Alland played the reporter Thompson) in 1941 when Mexican cinematographer Gabriel Figueroa told him about the myth of a race of half-fish, half-human creatures in the Amazon River. Figueroa spoke of a friend of his who disappeared in the Amazon while filming a documentary on a rumored population of fish-people. Alland then wrote story notes titled "The Sea Monster" 10 years later. There were various designs for the Gill-man. William Alland envisioned the Gill-man as a "sad, beautiful monster" and the sculpture of it was much like that of an aquatic development of a human. Alland said: "It would still frighten you, but because how human it was, not the other way around". Originally, the Gill-man's design was meant to incorporate a sleek, feminine eel-like figure, which did not have as many bumps and gills as the final version. The designer of the approved Gill-man was former Disney illustrator Milicent Patrick, though her role was deliberately downplayed by makeup artist Bud Westmore, who for half a century would receive sole credit for the Gill-man's conception. The Gill-man suit was made from airtight molded sponge rubber and cost $15,000. The underwater sequences were filmed at Wakulla Springs in northern Florida (today a state park), as were many of the rear projection images. Part of the film was shot in Jacksonville, Florida on the south side of the river near the foot of the old Acosta Bridge. In the underwater scenes, air was fed into the Gill-man suit with a rubber hose.

=== Biology ===
The Gill-man is fully amphibious, capable of breathing both in and out of the water. It possesses large, webbed hands with sharp claws on the tip of each finger. The Gill-man's scaly skin is extremely tough, which combined with a fast-acting healing factor, allows it to survive wounds which would be fatal to humans, such as gunshots and full immolation. It also possesses superhuman strength, which is flamboyantly displayed in the second and third films.

As shown in the third film, the Gill-man has a dormant set of lungs, should its gills be irreparably damaged. As shown in the first film, it is vulnerable to rotenone. The Gill-man is slightly photophobic, due to its murky water habitat. 35% of the Gill-man's blood is composed of white corpuscles, lacking a nucleus.

== Fictional character biography ==
=== Creature from the Black Lagoon ===
In Creature from the Black Lagoon, the last known surviving member of a race of amphibious humanoids which flourished during the Devonian age, the Gill-man (as christened by Dr. Thompson) dwelled in a lagoon located in a largely unexplored area of the Amazon rainforest. The creature was apparently known to the natives, as the captain of the boat Rita mentioned local legends of a "man-fish".

The Gill-man in his natural habitat, as portrayed by Ricou Browning in Creature from the Black Lagoon

After having found the fossilized remains of another Gill-man, a marine biology institute funds an expedition to the Amazon in order to find more remains. Though the Gill-man reacts violently to the intrusion, he develops a soft spot for the team's only female member, Kay, and repeatedly tries to abduct her, going as far as building a makeshift dam to prevent their boat from escaping. After having killed numerous members of the expedition, the Gill-man takes Kay to his underwater lair, where he is tracked down by the remaining survivors and riddled with bullets. The Gill-man tries to escape by swimming deep into the lagoon and supposedly dies from his injuries.

=== Revenge of the Creature ===
In Revenge of the Creature, which is set a year after the events of the first film, the Gill-man is shown to have survived and is captured by different scientists. He is sent to the Ocean Harbor Oceanarium in Florida, and quickly becomes a huge tourist attraction. He is studied by an animal psychologist and his ichthyology student. The psychologist's attempts at communicating with the Gill-man are hampered by his attraction to his student. The Gill-man breaks free from his tank and escapes into the ocean. It is not long before he begins stalking the ichthyology student and kidnaps her at a boat party. The Gill-man is soon tracked down by police and again is shot multiple times, forcing him to flee into the ocean. He again tries to swim away and supposedly dies from his wounds.

=== The Creature Walks Among Us ===
The mutated Gill-man, as he appears in The Creature Walks Among Us, as portrayed by Don Megowan

In The Creature Walks Among Us, after living for a short while in a Florida river, the Gill-man is found again, and after a vicious struggle is accidentally immolated. The Gill-man's injuries are so severe that his scales and gills have been burned away, forcing his captors to perform surgery on him to prevent suffocation. X-rays on the creature show that he has begun developing a land animal's lung structure, so a tracheotomy is performed, opening an air passage to the lungs, transforming the Gill-man into an air-breathing, nearly human animal. Dressing him in a suit made of sail cloth, the Gill-man is taken to a California estate, where he is imprisoned within an electric fence. Though they initially try to integrate the Gill-man into human society, one of his captors frames him for a murder. The Gill-man escapes, kills the real murderer (although severely wounded by gun shots), and ultimately returns to an ocean he can no longer exist in.

=== Cancelled remake ===
Producer Gary Ross said in March 2007 that the Gill-man's origin would be reinvented, with him being the result of a pharmaceutical corporation polluting the Amazon. In 2009, however, the proposed director, Breck Eisner, dropped out of the project. As of 2024, the proposed remake has not been made nor greenlit.

=== Reboot ===
Creature from the Black Lagoon was one of many films featuring the Universal monsters that would have received a reboot as a part of Universal Pictures' Dark Universe. The series would have brought Universal's monsters into a modern-day setting, beginning with The Mummy (2017). The Creature from the Black Lagoon had a story written by Jeff Pinkner and a script written by Will Beall. The Mummy alludes to the existence of the Gill-man when Nick Morton meets Dr. Henry Jekyll at Prodigium's base in London and one of the objects has the Gill-man's hand in it. However, Universal cancelled preproduction that had begun on Bride of Frankenstein which was to be the next film in the franchise, and postponed all plans for the Dark Universe slate of films.

== In literature ==
=== Creature from the Black Lagoon (1954 novelization) ===
Pulp fiction writer John Russell Fearn wrote a novelization of the Creature from the Black Lagoon screenplay under the pen name "Vargo Statten", which was originally published in the United Kingdom in 1954 by Dragon Publications Limited and then re-printed in 2011 in the United States by Dreamhaven Books (ISBN 1-892-05812-X).

=== Creature from the Black Lagoon (1981) ===
A "kids-friendly" adaptation by Ian Thorne of the screenplay and of the screenplays of the two sequels was published in 1981 by MCA Publishing (ISBN 0-89686-190-2).

=== Creature from the Black Lagoon (1977 novelization) ===
The 1977 novelization of Creature from the Black Lagoon by Walter Harris (writing under the pen-names "Carl Dreadstone" [United States, Berkley Publishing Group, ISBN 0-425-03464-X] and "E.K. Leyton" [United Kingdom, Star Books, ISBN 0-352-30548-7]) as part of the Universal Horror Library offers a completely different origin for the Gill-man, who in this version of the story is a hermaphroditic giant, almost as big as the Rita itself, weighing in at 30 tons. This Gill-man is both cold-blooded and warm-blooded and also has a long whip-like tail. The gigantic creature is dubbed "AA", for "Advanced Amphibian", by the expedition team members. After slaying most of the team members, destroying a Sikorsky helicopter, and kidnapping Kay more than once, the Gill-man is killed by the crew of a United States Navy torpedo boat.

=== Creature from the Black Lagoon: Black Water Horror - A Tale of Terror for the 21st Century ===
Larry Mike Garmon's novel was published in 2002 (ISBN 0-439-40228-X) as part of Scholastic's Universal Monsters series. The novel takes place in Southern Florida, where reports of shark attacks are suspected to in fact be the work of the Creature from the Black Lagoon.

=== Creature from the Black Lagoon: Time's Black Lagoon ===
In Paul Di Filippo's 2006 novel Time's Black Lagoon (ISBN 1-59582-033-7), which takes place 60 years after the events of the films, the Gill-man is depicted as descending from a race of extraterrestrials who came to Earth during the Devonian period on a giant spaceship called The Mother, which crashed on Earth. The Gill-People have the ability to communicate telepathically among themselves and among the human characters. Alphas such as "Fleshmolders", "Mudshapers", and "Fishcallers" are highly telepathic individuals in their tribal communities, who each choose a successor from among their respective tribes' children to take their place and title when they die.

The Gill-man itself is a degenerate member of this race, descended from an individual who explored deep in the ocean and became exposed to archaeobacteria, becoming deformed and insane, driven to infect others with the disease. Eventually, there were no healthy Gill-People left, and the race's numbers dwindled over the epochs to one individual in the 1950s, which is the one that appears in the original films.

== Theme park attractions ==
- The Gill-man was the star of Creature from the Black Lagoon: The Musical, a live performance show that once was added to the Universal Studios Hollywood theme park in Los Angeles, California. It debuted on July 1, 2009, and replaced Fear Factor Live. It closed down for good on March 9, 2010 and was replaced by Special Effects Stage, which opened three months later on June 26.
- The Gill-man was seen in the "Monsters Unchained: The Frankenstein Experiment" ride in Universal Epic Universe's "Dark Universe" section.

== See also ==
- Cultural impact of Creature from the Black Lagoon, which contains information about Gill-man's notable appearances in popular culture
- Deep Ones – similar monsters created by H.P. Lovecraft in his classic horror tale The Shadow Over Innsmouth
- List of piscine and amphibian humanoids
- Swamp monster
- Universal Monsters
- The Shape of Water (film by Guillermo del Toro with a similar plot)
