= Arthur A. Ross =

American screenwriter

- Born: February 4, 1920; Chicago, Illinois, U.S.
- Died: November 11, 2008 (aged 88); Los Angeles, California, U.S.
- Occupation: Screenwriter
- Spouse: Gail Ross
- Children: 2, Including Gary Ross

Arthur A. Ross (February 4, 1920 – November 11, 2008) was an American film and television screenwriter, best known for writing the Oscar-nominated script for Brubaker, The Great Race, and for co-writing Creature from the Black Lagoon with Harry Essex. He wrote numerous episodes of Alfred Hitchcock Presents and won the Edgar Allan Poe award for Thanatos Palace Hotel episode. He served in the United States Army during World War II and was blacklisted in Hollywood during the Red Scare. His son is writer, producer, and director Gary Ross. His daughter is constitutional and Indigenous rights lawyer, Stephanie Ross.

== Partial filmography ==
- Brubaker (1980)
- Satan's School for Girls (1973)
- The Great Race (1965)
- The Three Worlds of Gulliver (1960)
- Creature from the Black Lagoon (1954)
- Kazan (1949)
- Rusty Leads the Way (1948)
- San Quentin (1946)
