= Ben Chapman (actor) =

American actor

- Chapman as the Gill-man
- Born: Benjamin Franklin Chapman, Jr. October 29, 1928; Oakland, California, U.S.
- Died: February 21, 2008 (aged 79); Honolulu, Hawaii, U.S.
- Years active: 1949–2006
- Spouse: Merrilee Kazarian (m. 1982)
- Children: 2
- Website: www.the-reelgillman.com

Benjamin Franklin Chapman Jr. (October 29, 1928 – February 21, 2008) was an American actor best known as playing the Gill-man on land in the 1954 horror film Creature from the Black Lagoon.

== Early life ==
Born in Oakland, California, he spent much of his childhood in Tahiti and moved to San Francisco at age 12 or 13.

A Marine Corps veteran of the Korean War he served with the 1st Marine Division. He was believed to have earned a Silver Star, a Bronze Star, and two Purple Hearts for battle injuries. However, after his death, the Marine Corps Times began an investigation of these claims based on the improbability of the claim of receiving Purple Hearts in the Chosin Reservoir campaign. Information from Marine Corps records, which were received a month after obituaries with the claims awards of valor and of serving at the Chosin Reservoir, reveal that Chapman did serve in Korea. The Marine Corps Times reports that, "according to Marine Corps officials and a copy of Chapman’s military Report of Separation," Chapman never received the Silver Star, Bronze Star or Purple Hearts.

Before he played the Creature, he worked as a real estate executive.

== Gill Man ==
Chapman was selected as the Gill Man due to his large size at 6'5". His famous suit was made out of a foam-rubber body suit and a large-lipped headpiece. He cited horror film predecessors Lon Chaney Sr. in The Phantom of the Opera and The Hunchback of Notre Dame in the 1920s, Bela Lugosi in Dracula and Boris Karloff in Frankenstein and The Mummy in the 1930s, and Lon Chaney Jr. in The Wolf Man in the 1940s as inspirations to his character.

In a 1993 interview, Chapman explained that there were really two actors who played the Gill Man. He was the creature on land; Ricou Browning was the actor in water sequences. However, Chapman was the one who participated in Creature related events. Chapman further relayed that the studio did not want the public to know that the Gill Man was a man in a suit The suit, made of latex rubber, made it impossible for Chapman to sit down so during breaks from filming he would rest in a studio back lot lake to keep from overheating.

== Death ==
Ben Chapman died shortly after midnight on February 21, 2008, at the Tripler Army Medical Center in Honolulu, Hawaii. His son Ben Chapman III stated that he had "... heart problems [and] breathing problems." Other survivors include his wife of 25 years, self-proclaimed "Mrs Creature" Taylor Schlewitz; another son, Grant Chapman; stepdaughter Elyse Maree Raljevich; sister Moea (Harry) Baty; and "several" nieces and nephews. Chapman's ashes are to be scattered off Waikiki.

Ilene Wong, co-producer along with Wayne Maeda of the Hawai'i All-Collectors Show which Chapman attended from 1999 to 2007, said that he was

...always very happy and so giving. People would ask him about the movie, or Hollywood, and he would always provide the answers, help out. Ben would bring his briefcase and inside he had his memorabilia – posters, 8-by-10 glossies – and a good pen for autographs. He was just wonderful. In fact, we expected him this year. I think we will make a shrine for him.
