= Creature from the Black Lagoon =

1954 film by William Alland

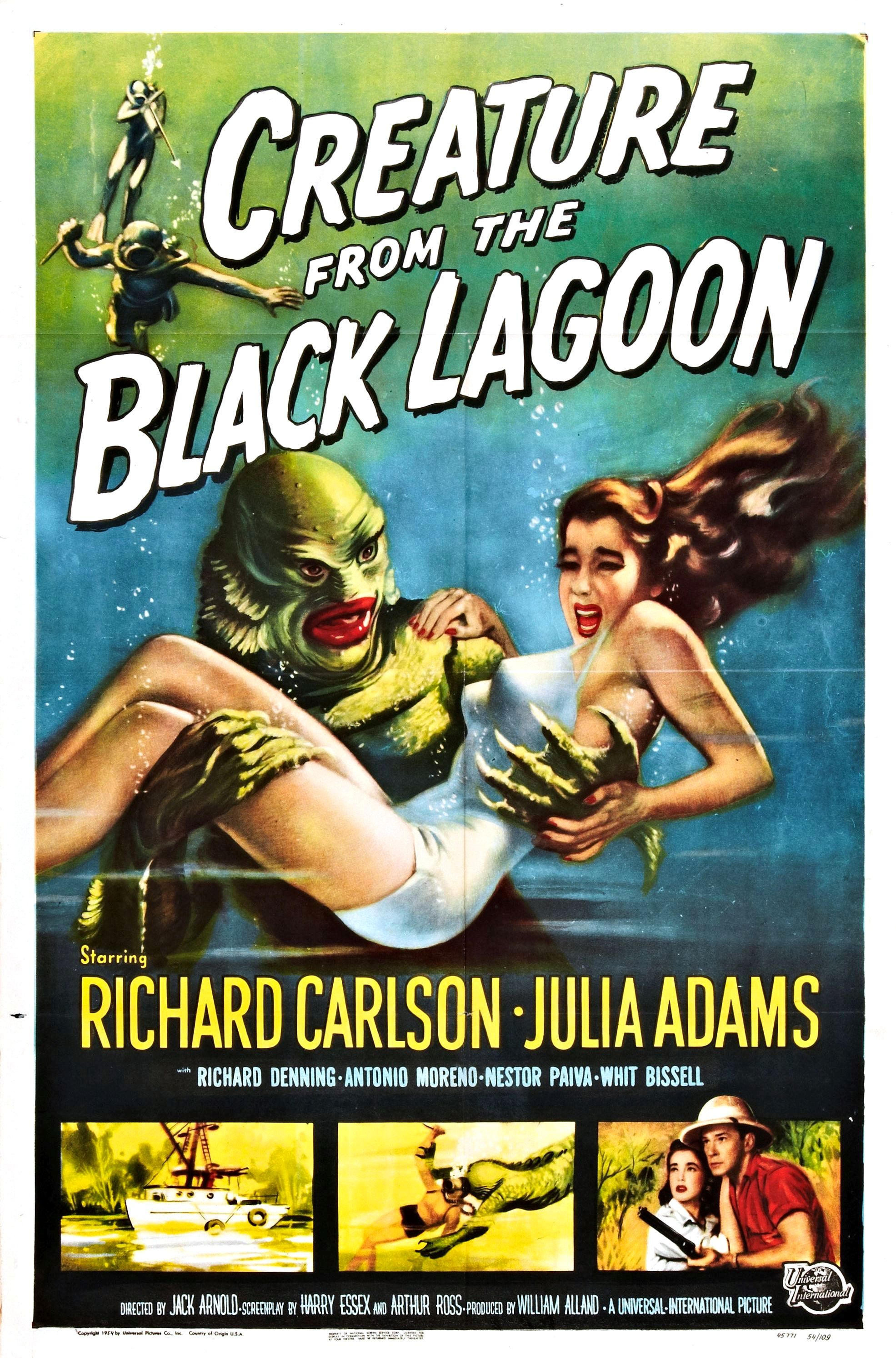
- Theatrical release poster by Reynold Brown
- Directed by: Jack Arnold
- Screenplay by: Harry Essex; Arthur Ross
- Story by: Maurice Zimm
- Produced by: William Alland
- Starring: Richard Carlson; Julia Adams; Richard Denning; Antonio Moreno; Nestor Paiva; Whit Bissell; Ben Chapman; Ricou Browning
- Cinematography: William E. Snyder
- Edited by: Ted J. Kent
- Music by: Henry Mancini; Hans J. Salter; Herman Stein
- Production company: Universal-International
- Distributed by: Universal-International
- Release dates: February 12, 1954 (premiere); March 5, 1954 (et al., regional openings)
- Running time: 79 minutes
- Country: United States
- Language: English
- Box office: $1,300,000

Creature from the Black Lagoon is a 1954 American monster film produced by William Alland and directed by Jack Arnold, from a screenplay by Harry Essex and Arthur Ross and a story by Maurice Zimm. It stars Richard Carlson, Julia Adams, Richard Denning, Antonio Moreno, Nestor Paiva, and Whit Bissell. The black-and-white film's plot follows a group of scientists who encounter a piscine amphibious humanoid in the waters of the Amazon; the Creature, also known as the Gill-man, was played by Ben Chapman on land and by Ricou Browning underwater. Produced and distributed by Universal-International, Creature from the Black Lagoon premiered in Detroit on February 12, 1954, and was released on a regional basis, opening on various dates.

Creature from the Black Lagoon was filmed in three dimensions (3D) and originally projected by the polarized light method. The audience wore viewers with gray polarizing filters, similar to the viewers most commonly used today. Because the brief 1950s 3D film fad had peaked in mid-1953 and was fading fast in early 1954, many audiences actually saw the film "flat", in two dimensions (2D). Typically, the film was shown in 3D in large downtown theaters and flat in smaller neighborhood theaters. In 1975, Creature from the Black Lagoon was released to theaters in the red-and-blue-glasses anaglyph 3D format, which was also used for a 1980 home video release on Beta and VHS videocassettes.

== Plot ==
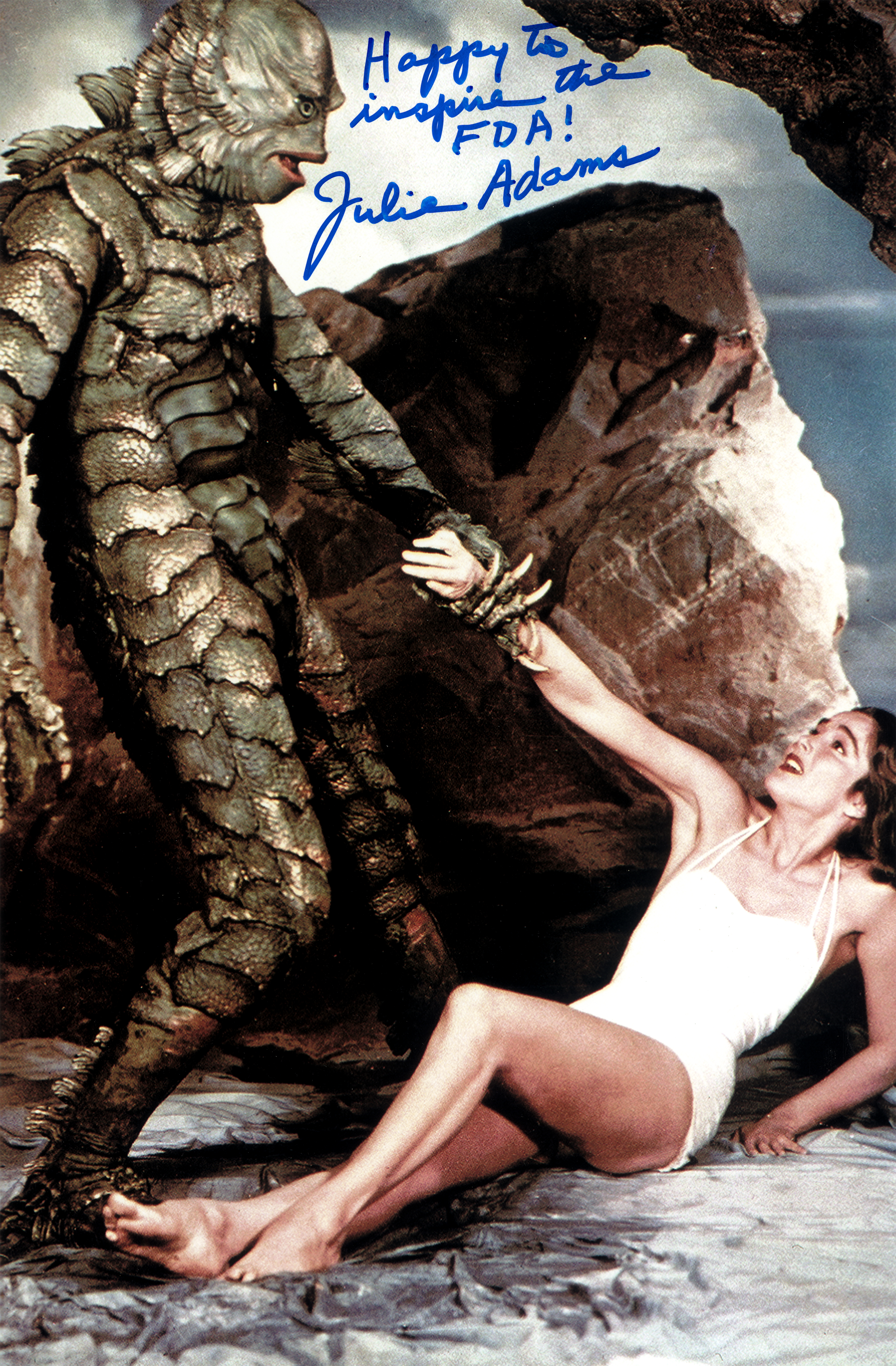
Autographed Julie Adams publicity photo, featuring the Creature menacing Kay

A geology expedition in the Amazon rainforest uncovers fossilized evidence (a skeletal hand with webbed fingers) from the Devonian period that provides a direct link between land and sea animals. Expedition leader Dr. Carl Maia orders his two assistants Luis and Tomas to stay in camp while he visits the marine biology institute.

Carl reunites with his friend and former student, ichthyologist Dr. David Reed. David works at an aquarium in California, but more recently, he has been a guest at Carl's institute in Brazil to study lungfish. David persuades his boss, the financially minded Dr. Mark Williams, to fund a return expedition to the Amazon to look for the remainder of the skeleton.

Soon after Carl leaves camp, a piscine amphibious humanoid, a living member of the same species from which the fossil originated, becomes curious about the expedition's camp. When its sudden appearance frightens the assistants, they panic and attack, and in response, the enraged Creature kills them both.

The group goes aboard the tramp steamer Rita, captained by crusty Lucas. The expedition consists of David, Carl, Mark, David's girlfriend and colleague Kay Lawrence, and another scientist, Dr. Edwin Thompson. When they arrive at the camp, they discover Carl's assistants have been killed while he was away. Lucas suggests it was likely done by a jaguar, but the others are unsure.

A further excavation of the area where Carl found the fossil turns up nothing. Mark is ready to give up the search, but David suggests that perhaps thousands of years ago, the part of the embankment containing the rest of the skeleton fell into the water and was washed downriver, broken up by the current. Carl says the tributary empties into a lagoon. Lucas calls it the "Black Lagoon", a paradise from which no one has ever returned. The scientists decide to risk it, unaware that the Creature - the amphibious "Gill-man" - that killed Carl's assistants has been watching them.

Taking notice of the beautiful Kay, the Creature follows the Rita all the way downriver to the Black Lagoon. Once the expedition arrives, David and Mark go diving to collect rock samples from the lagoon floor. After they return, Kay goes swimming and is stalked underwater by the Creature, who then gets briefly caught in one of the ship's drag lines. Although it escapes, the Creature leaves a claw behind in the net, revealing its existence.

After subsequent encounters with the Creature claim the lives of Lucas's crew members, it attacks Kay and attempts to abduct her, but it is captured and locked in a cage aboard the Rita. During the night, it escapes and attacks Edwin, who was guarding it. Edwin smashes the Creature with a lantern, driving it off, but he is severely injured. Following this incident, David decides they should return to civilization. Mark, who is obsessed with capturing (or killing) the Creature, objects.

As the Rita tries to leave, they find the Creature has blocked the lagoon's entrance with fallen logs. While the others attempt to remove the logs, Mark is mauled to death while trying to capture the Creature single-handed underwater. The Creature then climbs aboard the Rita and approaches Kay from behind. She screams as the Creature grabs her, taking her away to its cavern lair. David, Lucas, and Carl pursue them, rescuing Kay and fatally shooting the Creature in the chest. It meanders aimlessly outside before wading back into the lagoon and attempts to swim away, but dies of its injuries and sinks into the darkness of the water as the group watch.

== Cast ==
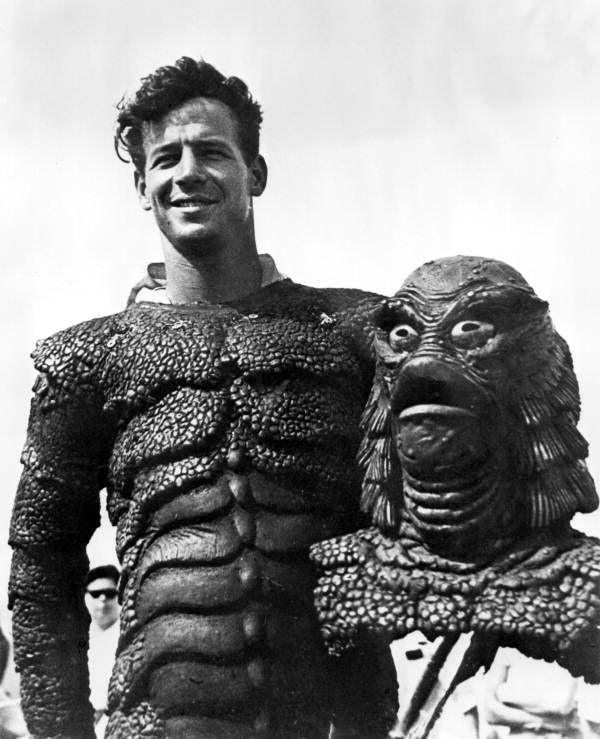
Ricou Browning played the "Gill-man" in the underwater scenes of Creature from the Black Lagoon (1954), Revenge of the Creature (1955), and The Creature Walks Among Us (1956).

- Richard Carlson as Dr. David Reed
- Julia Adams as Kay Lawrence
  - Ginger Stanley as Kay Lawrence (underwater; uncredited)
- Richard Denning as Dr. Mark Williams
- Antonio Moreno as Dr. Carl Maia
- Nestor Paiva as Captain Lucas
- Whit Bissell as Dr. Edwin Thompson
- Bernie Gozier as Zee
- Henry Escalante as Chico
- Rodd Redwing as Luis
- Perry Lopez as Tomas
- Sydney Mason as Dr. Matos
- Ricou Browning as the Gill-man (underwater; uncredited)
  - Ben Chapman as the Gill-man (on land; uncredited)

== Production ==
Producer William Alland was attending a 1941 dinner party during the filming of Citizen Kane (in which he played the reporter Thompson) when Mexican cinematographer Gabriel Figueroa told him about mythical stories of the Yacuruna, a race of half-fish, half-human creatures said to live in the Amazon River. Alland wrote story notes titled "The Sea Monster" 10 years later, using Beauty and the Beast as inspiration. In December 1952, Maurice Zimm expanded this into a treatment, which Harry Essex and Arthur Ross rewrote as The Black Lagoon. Following the success of the 3D film House of Wax in 1953, Jack Arnold was hired to direct the film in the same format.

Milicent Patrick, formerly an animator for Disney, was the primary designer for the head and face of the Gill-man costume. However, make-up artist Bud Westmore downplayed Patrick's importance, and for half a century Westmore received sole credit for the creature's conception. Jack Kevan, who worked on The Wizard of Oz (1939) and made prosthetics for amputees during World War II, created the bodysuit, while Chris Mueller Jr. sculpted the head.

Ben Chapman portrayed the Gill-man for the majority of the scenes shot at Universal City, California. The on-water scenes were filmed at Park Lake on the Universal back lot. The costume made it impossible for Chapman to sit for 14 hours of each day that he wore it, and the suit overheated easily. Due to these difficulties, Chapman often stayed in the studio's back-lot lake, frequently requesting to be hosed down. The headpiece obscured Chapman's vision, which caused him to accidentally scrape Julie Adams' head against the wall when carrying her in the grotto scenes.

Ricou Browning played the Gill-man in the underwater shots, which were filmed by the second unit in Wakulla Springs, Florida. While filming underwater, Browning reportedly held his breath for up to four minutes at a time. In a 2013 interview, Browning clarified: "If you're not doing anything at all, four minutes is possible, but not if you're moving in the water. If you're swimming fast or fighting, you use up a lot of oxygen, and it cuts it down to, at the most, two minutes."

== Reception and analysis ==
On the review aggregator website Rotten Tomatoes, 81% of 47 critics' reviews are positive. The website's consensus reads: "A solid, atmospheric creature feature that entertains without attempting to be deeper than it needs." Metacritic, which uses a weighted average, assigned the film a score of 68 out of 100, based on 11 critics, indicating "generally favorable" reviews.

Leonard Maltin awarded the film three out of four stars, writing: "Archetypal '50s monster movie has been copied so often that some of the edge is gone, but ... is still entertaining, with juicy atmosphere and luminous underwater photography sequences." The film is recognized by American Film Institute in these lists:

- 2001: AFI's 100 Years...100 Thrills – Nominated
- 2003: AFI's 100 Years...100 Heroes & Villains:
  - Gill-man – Nominated Villain

Psychoanalyst Barbara Creed provided a feminist reading of classical movie monsters like the Creature or the Phantom of the Opera, arguing that despite their superficially masculine characterizations, their antagonization of a powerful male hero instead positions them as opponents of the patriarchal social order, thus imbuing them with feminine traits and creating a sympathetic connection between them and the women they victimize.

In 2025, The Hollywood Reporter listed Creature from the Black Lagoon as having the best stunts of 1954.

== Sequels and remakes ==
=== Sequels ===
Creature from the Black Lagoon spawned two sequels: Revenge of the Creature (1955), which was also filmed and released in 3D in hopes of reviving the format, and The Creature Walks Among Us (1956), filmed in 2D. A comedic appearance with Abbott and Costello on an episode of The Colgate Comedy Hour aired prior to the first film's release. The appearance is commonly known as Abbott and Costello Meet the Creature from the Black Lagoon.

=== Planned remakes ===
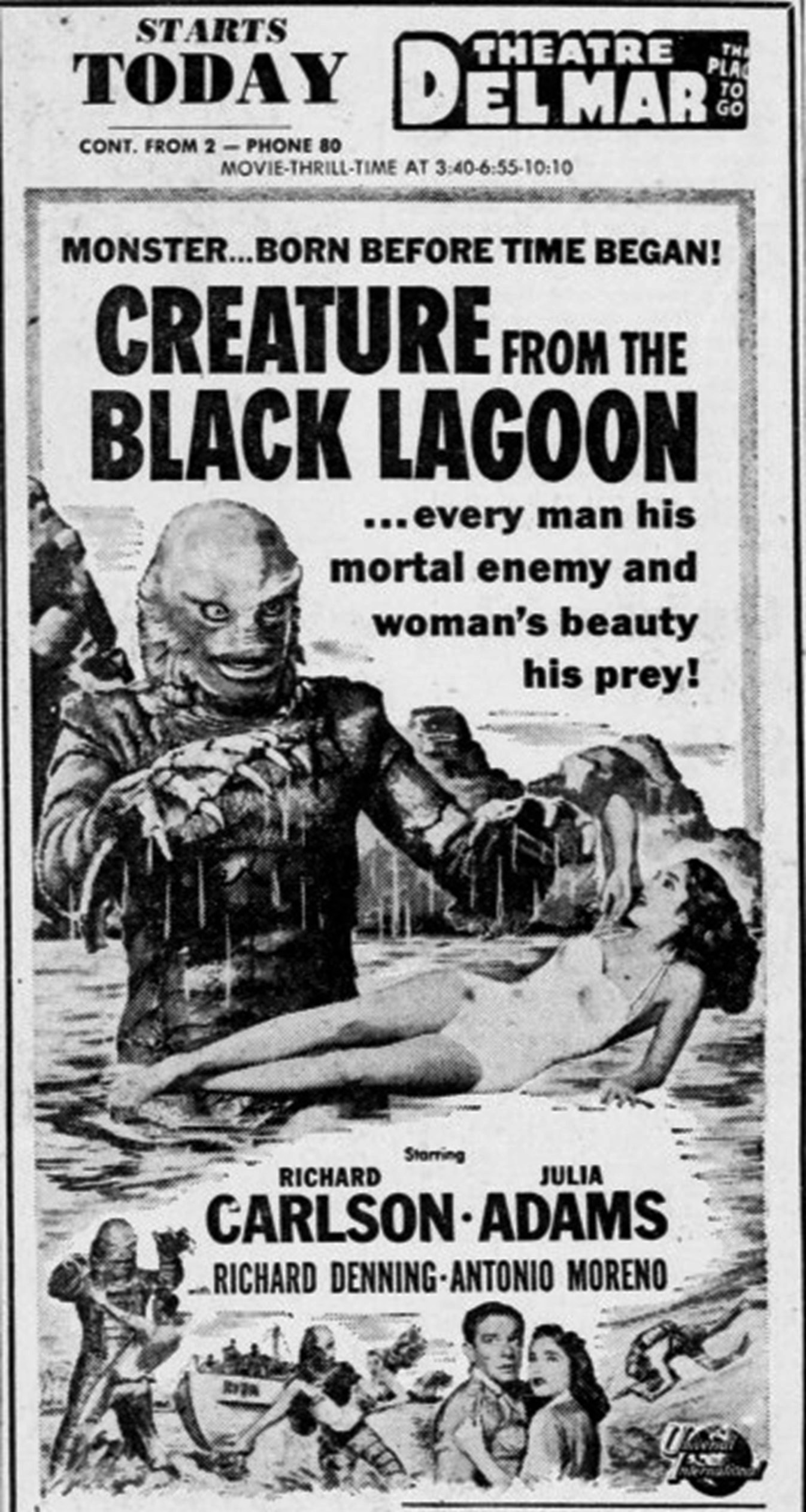
Advertisement from 1954

In 1982, John Landis wanted Jack Arnold to direct a remake of the film, and Nigel Kneale was commissioned to write the screenplay. Kneale completed the script, which involved a pair of creatures, one destructive and the other calm and sensitive, being persecuted by the United States Navy. A decision to make the film in 3D led to the remake being canceled by producers at Universal, both for budgetary concerns and to avoid a clash with Jaws 3-D.

In 1992, John Carpenter was developing the remake at Universal. He originally hired Bill Phillips to write the script, while Rick Baker was hired to create the 3D model of the Creature, but the project never got the green light. Herschel Weingrod and Timothy Harris wrote a new script, and Universal offered Peter Jackson the director's chair in 1995, but he chose to work instead on King Kong.

In February 1996, Ivan Reitman was planning to direct the remake, but it never materialized. With the financial success of The Mummy remake in May 1999, the development of the Creature from the Black Lagoon remake was revived. In December 2001, Gary Ross signed on to write and produce the remake with his father, Arthur A. Ross, one of the original's writers. He told The Hollywood Reporter: "The story my father wrote embodies the clash between primitive men and civilized men, and that obviously makes it a fertile area for re-examination".

In August 2002, Guillermo del Toro, a fan of the original feature, was attached to direct a remake. He had hoped to do a story focused more on the Creature's viewpoint while also letting him have a successful romantic liaison. He later went on to turn this idea into the 2017 film The Shape of Water after Universal rejected the concept. Because of these creative clashes and his commitments to many other projects, Universal dropped del Toro and hired Tedi Sarafian (credited on Terminator 3: Rise of the Machines) to write a script in March 2003.

In October 2005, Breck Eisner signed on as director. He said to be a fan of the film: "As a kid, I remember loving Jack Arnold's original version of this film. What I really want to do is update an iconic image from the '50s and bring in more of the sci-fi sensibility of Alien or John Carpenter's The Thing (1982)". Ross said in March 2007 the Gill-man's origin would be reinvented, with him being the result of a pharmaceutical corporation polluting the Amazon.

However, the production was delayed by the 2007–2008 Writers Guild of America strike; as a result, Eisner instead made The Crazies (2010), the number-one project on his priority list. His new goal was to finish The Crazies and then begin filming Creature from the Black Lagoon in Manaus, Brazil, and on the Amazon River in Peru. Eisner was inspired to shoot on location by the film Fitzcarraldo, and the boat set had been built. Eisner continued to rewrite the script, which was to be a summer blockbuster full of "action and excitement, but [still] scary". Eisner spent six months designing the new incarnation of the Gill-man with Mark McCreery (Jurassic Park, and Davy Jones' designer). The director said the new design was "very faithful to the original, but updated" and that the Gill-man would still remain sympathetic. In 2009, it was reported that Carl Erik Rinsch might direct a remake that would be produced by Marc Abraham, Eric Newman, and Gary Ross; however, a project featuring the ensemble had been abandoned by 2011.

In March 2012, Universal announced that a remake was in development and would simply be titled The Black Lagoon rather than Creature from the Black Lagoon to distinguish between the two versions. In October, the studio hired Dave Kajganich to write the film. The film was expected to hit theaters by May 2014 but was ultimately canceled. In 2020, Universal was considering Scarlett Johansson and Chris Evans for a remake.

Universal Pictures, beginning as early as 2014, began developing a shared universe of rebooted modern-day versions of their classic Universal Monsters, with the studio having various films in different stages of development. The series began with The Mummy (2017) and was intended to be followed by the remake of Bride of Frankenstein in 2019 prior to the critical and commercial failure of The Mummy. The Creature from the Black Lagoon was a remake also intended to be developed within the reboot with a story written by Jeff Pinkner and a script written by Will Beall. In June, Kurtzman revealed that the Gill-man in this film would be from the Amazon, but on November 8, Alex Kurtzman and Chris Morgan moved on to other projects, leaving the future of the Dark Universe even further in doubt. In January 2019, the Dark Universe film series was officially scrapped.

In August 2024, it was announced that James Wan was in talks to direct a remake of Creature from the Black Lagoon. Sean Tretta was reported to be set to write the screenplay based on a treatment by Wan, Rafael Jordan, and Bryan Coyne.

== Legacy ==
- A 1992 Bally pinball machine, Creature from the Black Lagoon was licensed and loosely based on the film, incorporating a holographic version of Gill-man.
- The fossil species Eucritta melanolimnetes ("true creature" + "from the black lagoon") is named after the film.

== Bibliography ==
- Ferrari, Andrea. Il Cinema Dei Mostri. Milan, Italy: Mondadori, 2003. ISBN 88-435-9915-1.
- Murray, Andy. Into the Unknown: The Fantastic Life of Nigel Kneale. Stockport, Cheshire, UK: Critical Vision, 2005. ISBN 1-900486-50-4.
- Vieira, Mark A. (2003). Hollywood Horror: From Gothic to Cosmic. New York: Harry N. Abrams. ISBN 0-8109-4535-5.
- Warren, Bill. Keep Watching the Skies: American Science Fiction Films of the Fifties, 21st Century Edition. Jefferson, North Carolina: McFarland & Company, 2009, (First edition 1982). ISBN 0-89950-032-3.
- Weaver, Tom; Schecter, David; Kronenberg, Steve (2018). The Creature Chronicles: Exploring the Black Lagoon Trilogy. Jefferson, North Carolina: McFarland & Company. ISBN 978-1476673868.
