= The Space Children =

1958 film by Jack Arnold

- Theatrical release poster
- Directed by: Jack Arnold
- Screenplay by: Bernard C. Schoenfeld
- Story by: Tom Filer
- Based on: The Egg by Tom Filer
- Produced by: William Alland
- Starring: Michel Ray; Adam Williams; Peggy Webber; Johnny Washbrook; Jackie Coogan; Richard Shannon
- Cinematography: Ernest Laszlo
- Edited by: Terry O. Morse
- Music by: Van Cleave
- Color process: Black and white
- Production company: William Alland Productions
- Distributed by: Paramount Pictures
- Release date: June 26, 1958 (US)
- Running time: 69 minutes
- Country: United States
- Language: English

The Space Children is a 1958 independently made American science-fiction film, produced by William Alland, directed by Jack Arnold, and starring Michel Ray, Jackie Coogan, Russell Johnson, Johnny Crawford, Johnny Washbrook and Richard Shannon. The film's special effects were handled by John P. Fulton, and the makeup was by Wally Westmore. The film was released on June 26, 1958 by Paramount as a double feature with The Colossus of New York (1958).

The character Eadie Johnson is portrayed by actor Sandy Descher, who had previous science-fiction film experience when she played the catatonic child in Warner Bros. Them! (1954).

The movie was featured on an episode of the comedy show Mystery Science Theater 3000 in 1998 and is one of only 11 episodes to not have a commercial release due to copyright issues.

== Plot ==
A seaside trailer park houses personnel working with the military to complete the Thunderer, a rocket that will place an atomic device in permanent Earth orbit. The Thunderer will allow the United States to rapidly strike at any enemy nation.

Seven children who live there meet on the beach and become friends. While playing together, they observe a beam of light shining down onto the beach. A small, glowing object floats down amid the beam and disappears among the rocks. One of the kids, Bud Brewster, seems to start listening to a voice only he can hear.

That evening, after a community cookout, the kids head back to the beach and encounter a small alien life form, resting. The alien telepathically assigns them a secret mission, and Bud will be their leader.

He and his brother Ken return to their trailer and tell their parents about the alien. Their father Dave becomes angry, believing they are lying to excuse the fact that they stayed out late and worried their parents. However, when Dave grabs Bud, his arm is paralyzed. The kids are under the alien's protection. Confused, Dave accompanies six of the kids back to the alien's hideout. The seventh, Tim, is accosted by his drunken stepfather Joe. Tim breaks away and runs after the group, but Joe chases him, shouting violent threats.

Joe catches up with Tim, throws him to the ground, picks up a piece of driftwood and raises it to strike him. In its hiding place, the alien blazes with light, and Joe is thrown backwards. Terrified, Joe flees.

Tim joins the other children and Dave as they arrive at the alien's lair. After silently conveying its instructions to Bud, the alien is carried back to the trailer by Dave. There, Bud says the alien must be kept safe until the following evening but does not explain why. His mother Anne is frightened for the family's safety.

When Tim returns to the trailers, he finds Joe's body as an ambulance arrives. The alien killed Joe because he threatened Tim's life.

The next morning, the Brewsters discover that the alien has doubled in size. Its purpose is connected to the launch of the Thunderer, which will happen that night. Bud and Ken carry the alien out and take it to a cave along the beach. Dave hurries to the base to warn the authorities about the possible threat from the alien. When he meets with Dr. Wahrman and Colonel Manley, Dave's voice is paralyzed, and he passes out after trying to write a message.

During the next hours, the children perform tasks about the base while the alien mentally controls various people and objects such as sentries and locked gates to ensure that the mission is carried out.

In the infirmary, a fully recovered Dave tells Wahrman about the alien. Wahrman realizes that he, too, will be prevented from speaking to others about the alien, so the two men drive out to its cave. The alien has grown even larger. Wahrman asks the alien about its intentions, but it remains silent. The men give up and rush back to the base just as the Thunderer is about to be launched, realizing the alien will stop them from trying to interfere.

When the launch button is pressed, an explosion within the nose cone destroys the nuclear warhead, rendering the Thunderer useless. The children have succeeded in their sabotage. Wahrman orders the soldiers to follow him back to the cave, where they confront the children, who are blocking the entrance together. The alien glides out of the cave and ascends on another beam of light. Wahrman asks Bud why the Thunderer was destroyed.

Bud says his group did what other children have done in several other countries; they sabotaged rockets that would have carried nuclear devices into space, making humankind's self-destruction easy if such weapons were ever used. The aliens were concerned about humankind's welfare and relied on teams of loyal children all over the world to prevent humankind from making a terrible mistake.

== Cast ==
- Michel Ray as Bud Brewster
- Adam Williams as Dave Brewster
- Peggy Webber as Anne Brewster
- Johnny Washbrook as Tim Gamble
- Jackie Coogan as Hank Johnson
- Richard Shannon as Lieutenant Colonel Alan Manley
- Raymond Bailey as Dr. Wahrman
- Sandy Descher as Eadie Johnson
- Larry Pennell as Major Thomas
- Peter Baldwin as Security Officer James
- Ty Hardin as Sentry
- Russell Johnson as Joe Gamble
- David Bair as Saul Wahrman
- Johnny Crawford as Ken Brewster
- Eilene Janssen as Phyllis Manley
- Jean Engstrom as Peg Gamble

== Production ==
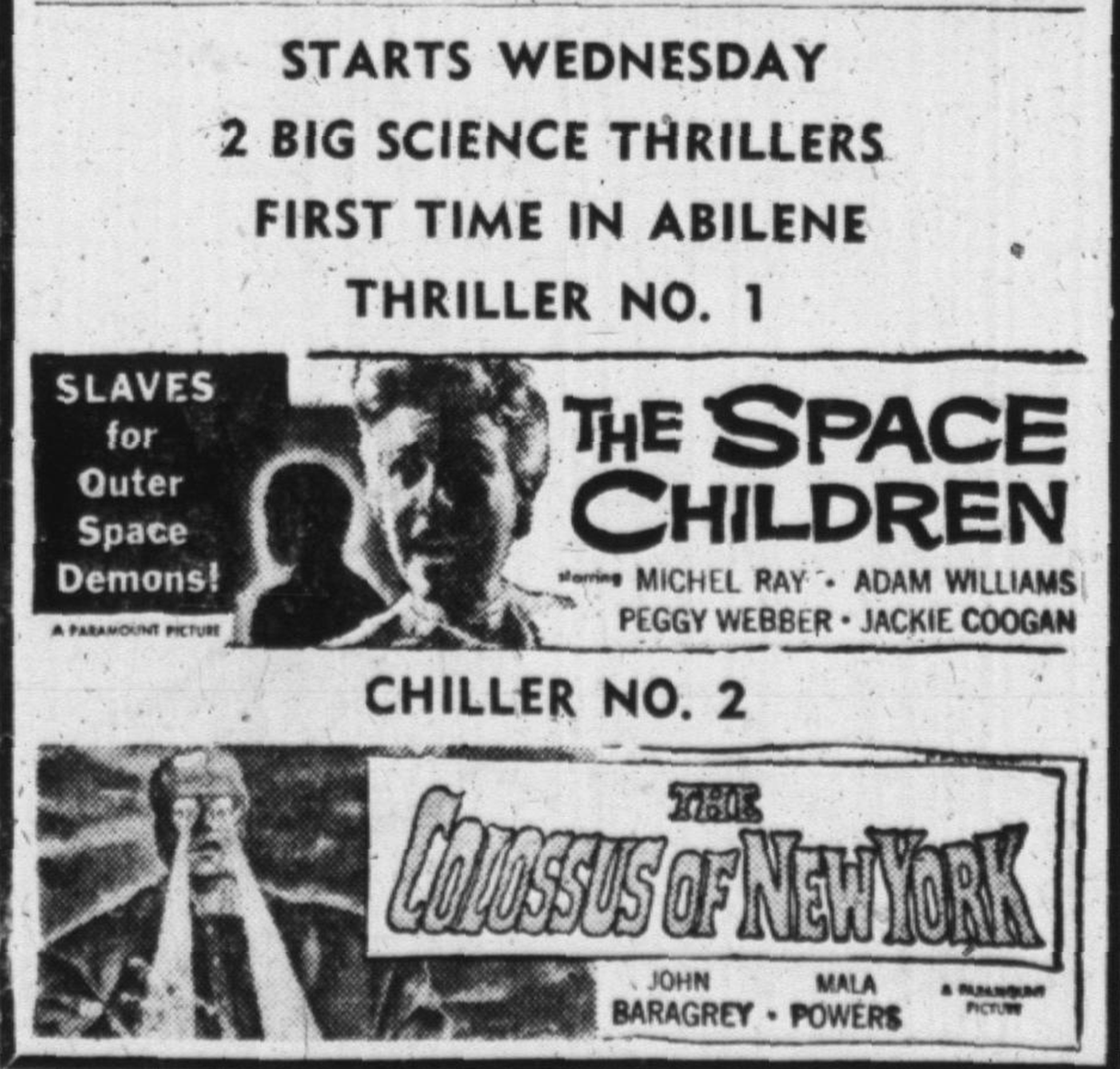
Advertisement from 1958 for The Space Children and co-feature, The Colossus of New York

The Space Children was William Alland's first feature film with Paramount. It was loosely based on The Egg, an unpublished story by Tom Filer (involving a girl with polio) that was significantly different from the final plot of the film.

The alien brain was created by special-effects artist Ivyl Burks and used $3,300 of neon lights to create its glowing effect.

According to Webber, the original leading lady dropped out at the last minute. In a panic, Alland called Orson Welles (for whom he had acted in The Mercury Theatre and Citizen Kane) and asked if he knew any actress who could step in on such short notice. Welles replied, "Yes. Peggy Webber." (She'd worked with him on radio and in his 1948 film version of Macbeth and had impressed him with how rapidly she could find her character.)

== Theatrical release ==
The Space Children was first released in theaters by Paramount on June 26, 1958, as part of a double bill with The Colossus of New York (1958), which was also produced by William Alland.

== Home media ==
The Space Children was released on DVD in 2006 as part of the Lost Movie Classics Collection by RoDon Enterprises. In 2012, a combo Blu-ray/DVD was released by Olive Films.

== Mystery Science Theater 3000 ==
The movie was featured in episode #906 of Mystery Science Theater 3000, which first aired on the Sci-Fi Channel on June 13, 1998; the episode also featured the short "Century 21 Calling." Writer Paul Chaplin's recap of the episode repeatedly mentions the depression of all the characters. "Everybody hates everybody," he writes. "The most cheerful character is a racist xenophobe played by Jackie Coogan."

Paste writer Jim Vorel ranked the episode #113 out of 197 MST3K episodes from the first twelve seasons. He calls The Space Children "a weird little ‘50s sci-fi yarn." Mentioning the movie "thought it had a valuable lesson to teach us all about the perils of nuclear war," he compares the movie to "a dime store version of The Day the Earth Stood Still". He also mentions the trio of prominent sitcom '60s actors — Jackie Coogan, "Mr. Drysdale from The Beverly Hillbillies and even The Professor from Gilligan’s Island" — as one of the episode's notable features.

The MST3K version of The Space Children has not been released on DVD. The segments of the episode that take place outside of the movie theater were included in the Satellite Dishes disc on MST3K: Volume XXXIX, which was released October 31, 2017.
