= Forrest Lewis =

American actor (1899–1977)

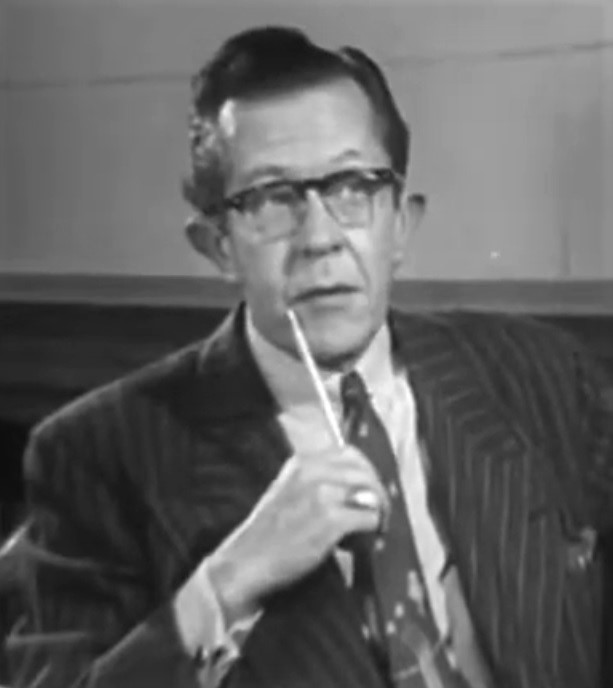
- Forrest Lewis in the TV series Medic, episode Break Through the Bars (1955)
- Born: November 5, 1899; Knightstown, Indiana, U.S.
- Died: June 2, 1977 (aged 77); Burbank, California, U.S.
- Occupation: Actor
- Years active: 1943–1973
- Spouse: Elsa Grace Cross (m. 1917, divorced)
- Children: 1

Raymond Forrest Lewis (November 5, 1899 – June 2, 1977) was an American actor of the theater, radio, motion pictures and television — profiled in a September 1, 1948, St. Louis Post-Dispatch feature titled "Forrest Lewis – Man of Thousand Voices" — who frequently performed vocal impressions and dialect roles across old-time radio, including imitating Peter Lorre.

== Early years ==
Lewis was born in Knightstown, Indiana, the son of Joseph Saint Lewis and Myla Leota Lewis and attended Indiana University for a year. On August 23, 1917, he married Elsa Grace Cross in Knightstown. They had a son, Forrest Gallion Lewis, and eventually divorced.

== Stage ==
Lewis acted in repertory theater and then on Broadway with Lenore Ulric in Lulu Belle. He also acted in touring productions, including Broken Dishes (1930).

== Radio ==
Lewis was a staple of golden-age radio, appearing on shows such as The Great Gildersleeve (as Mr. Peavey), I Love a Mystery, Scattergood Baines, and Meet the Meeks. Before transitioning to film and television (such as The Andy Griffith Show and The Absent-Minded Professor), he specialized in playing eccentric, elderly, or dialect-heavy characters—frequently filling in as a vocal imitator for distinct voices like Peter Lorre when scripts called for sinister or European-accented characters Lewis's roles on radio programs, also having a recurring role as Le Chat on Yours Truly, Johnny Dollar. Other show roles are included in the table below.

Program	Role
The Great Gildersleeve	Peavey
I Love a Mystery	Michael
Meet the Meeks	Mortimer Meek
Mystery House	Dan Glenn
Scattergood Baines	J. Wellington Keats
The Woman in My House	James Carter

Also in radio (1948–1950) he had parts in the anthology Destination Freedom, a series written by Richard Durham, dedicated to the retelling the lives of notable Negros in the Americas.

Lewis was in the supporting cast of Family Skeleton and The Roy Rogers Show.

== Television ==
Lewis played Peavey in the syndicated television version of The Great Gildersleeve (1954–1955) and Mr. Mack, the host on the ABC children's series Sandy Strong (1952).

In the mid-1950s, he appeared as a deputy in the syndicated crime drama The Sheriff of Cochise and its successor series, U.S. Marshal, both starring John Bromfield. He guest starred with Maudie Prickett in the episode "Brief Glory" of the syndicated Western series 26 Men, starring Tris Coffin. He appeared on a wide array of programs, ranging from the CBS Western series My Friend Flicka, set on a Wyoming ranch, to the NBC sitcom, The People's Choice, with Jackie Cooper, to the ABC's Western drama, The Man from Blackhawk, starring Robert Rockwell. He also appeared on the NBC Western series, Riverboat, starring Darren McGavin, and on the ABC sitcom, Harrigan and Son, starring Pat O'Brien, and the ABC drama series about the Roman Catholic priesthood, Going My Way. In 1957 Lewis appeared as Charlie Miller in the TV Western Cheyenne in the episode titled "Land Beyond the Law." He played Doc Blake in Wanted: Dead or Alive S2 E13 "No Trail Back" which aired 11/28/1959.

Lewis was cast as the recurring character, Colby, in the 1961–1962 CBS sitcom Ichabod and Me with Robert Sterling, George Chandler, Reta Shaw, and Burt Mustin. Lewis also guest starred in the ABC/Warner Brothers Western series, Colt .45 with Wayde Preston, on the syndicated Western Mackenzie's Raiders, starring Richard Carlson, on the CBS hit comedy, The Andy Griffith Show, and on the ABC sitcom, The Real McCoys, starring Walter Brennan.

== Death ==
Lewis died from a heart attack on June 2, 1977, in Burbank, California.

== Partial filmography ==
- Gildersleeve on Broadway (1943) – Druggist Carson (uncredited)
- I'll Tell the World (1945) – Joe Sunshine (uncredited)
- Week-End with Father (1951) – Clarence Willett
- Has Anybody Seen My Gal (1952) – Martin Quinn
- It Grows on Trees (1952) – Dr. Burrows
- The Lawless Breed (1953) – Zeke Jenkins
- The Clown (1953) – Mr. Huston, the Pawnbroker (uncredited)
- Francis Covers the Big Town (1953) – Judge Stanley
- Take Me To Town (1953) – Ed Higgins, Storekeeper
- The Stand at Apache River (1953) – Deadhorse
- Gun Fury (1953) – Weatherby
- Escape from Fort Bravo (1953) – Dr. Miller (uncredited)
- Dial Red O (1955) – Captain (uncredited)
- Cell 2455, Death Row (1955) – Parole Officer (uncredited)
- Apache Ambush (1955) – Sheriff Silas Parker
- All That Heaven Allows (1955) – Mr. Weeks
- The Spoilers (1955) – Banty Jones
- Man in the Shadow (1957) – Jake Kelley, the coroner
- The Sheepman (1958) – Mr. Baker – Tack Shop Proprietor (uncredited)
- The Thing That Couldn't Die (1958) – Julian Ash
- The Shaggy Dog (1959) – Officer Kelly
- The Monster of Piedras Blancas (1959) – Constable George Matson
- Posse from Hell (1961) – Doctor Welles
- The Absent-Minded Professor (1961) – Police Officer Kelley
- Son of Flubber (1963) – Police Officer Kelly
- Tammy and the Doctor (1963) – Dr. Crandall
- Man's Favorite Sport? (1964) – Skaggs
- The Dick Van Dyke Show (1965) – Mr. Harlow, Numismatist
- Red Line 7000 (1965) – Jenkins (uncredited)
- Out of Sight (1966) – Mr. Carter
- Riot on Sunset Strip (1967) – Aynsley
- The Monkees (1967) – Pop in S1:E22, "Monkees at the Circus"
- Skin Game (1971) – Peter (uncredited)
- The Todd Killings (1971) – Mr. Robinson
