= William Alland =

American actor, producer, writer, and director

- Born: March 4, 1916; Delmar, Delaware, U.S.
- Died: November 11, 1997 (aged 81); Long Beach, California, U.S.
- Occupations: Producer, writer, actor
- Notable work: Look in Any Window

William Alland (March 4, 1916 – November 11, 1997) was an American actor, film producer and writer, mainly of Western and science-fiction/monster films, including This Island Earth, It Came From Outer Space, Tarantula!, The Deadly Mantis, The Mole People, The Colossus of New York, The Space Children, and the three Creature from the Black Lagoon films. He worked frequently with director Jack Arnold. Alland is also remembered for his acting role as reporter Thompson, who investigates the meaning of "Rosebud" in Orson Welles's Citizen Kane (1941).

== Biography ==
Alland was born in Delmar, Delaware.

Alland entered films as an actor, perhaps best remembered as the reporter Jerry Thompson, who investigates the life of newspaper tycoon Charles Foster Kane in Orson Welles's Citizen Kane (1941). He also directed the film Look in Any Window.

In his early 20s, Alland arrived in Manhattan and took courses at the Henry Street Settlement House, where he met Orson Welles. He lent his voice to Welles's The War of the Worlds. Alland won a Peabody Award as producer of Doorway to Life.

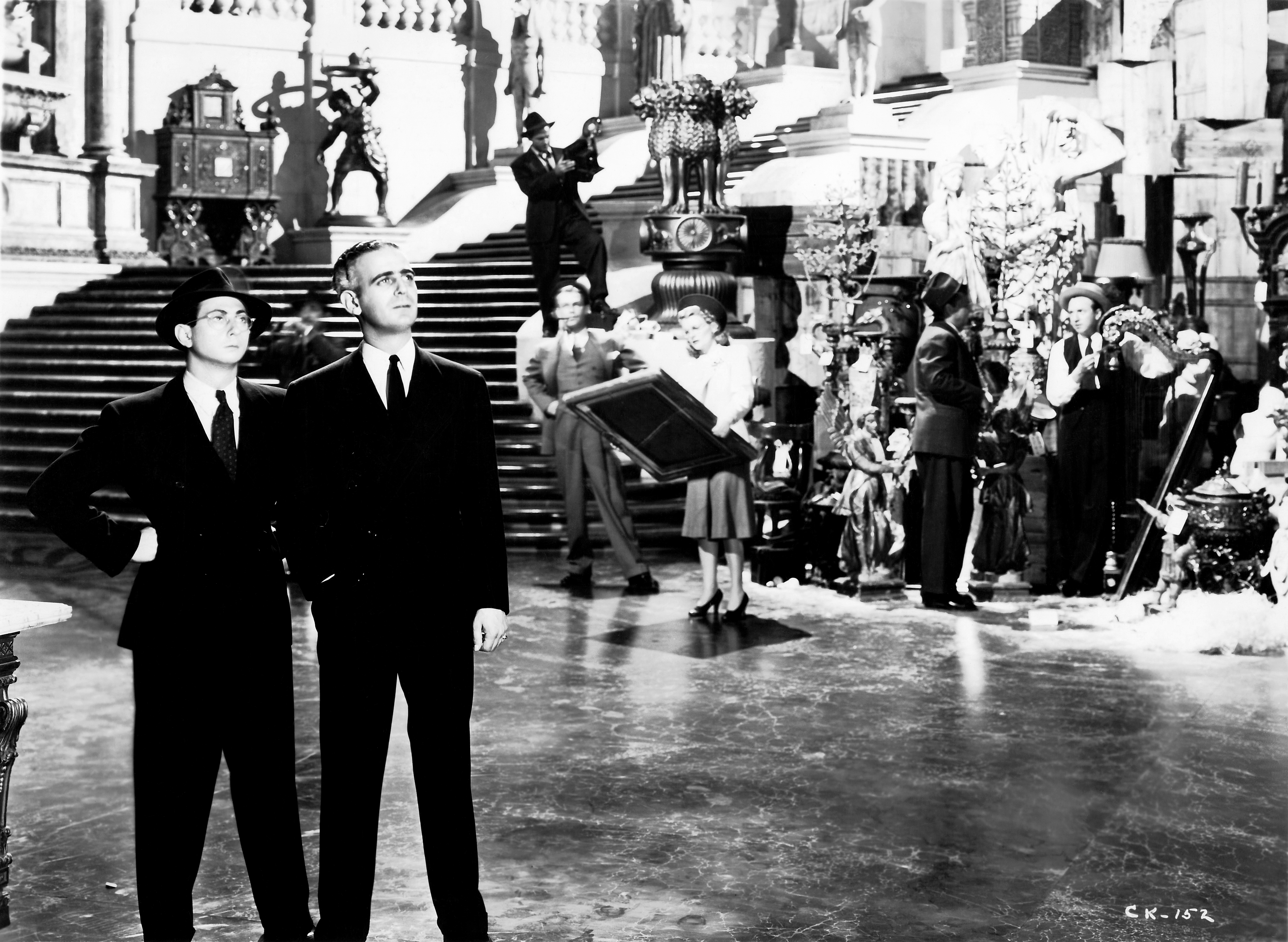
William Alland (left) with Paul Stewart in a publicity still for Citizen Kane (1941) that shows Alland's face, never clearly seen in the film

Alland's role as reporter Jerry Thompson in Citizen Kane (1941) is unusual because the camera never closes up on his face; in fact, for the majority of his scenes in the film, he shows his back to the camera, and whenever his face can be seen, it is always in long-shot and almost always clouded in shadow. As noted by film critic Roger Ebert on the DVD commentary of Citizen Kane, Alland once reportedly told an audience that they would probably recognize him if he were to show his back to them. In addition to his role as Thompson in Citizen Kane, Alland announces the "News on the March" newsreel segment, a spoof of the then-popular March of Time newsreels. In later years, Alland twice provided voiceovers for pastiches of this News on the March segment: once for the 1974 Orson Welles film F for Fake and again for a 1991 Arena documentary for the BBC titled The Complete Citizen Kane.

In 1953, Alland appeared before a meeting of the House Un-American Activities Committee in Los Angeles, acknowledging that he had been a member of the Communist Party and naming other people who were involved with the party. The meeting was held behind closed doors, but Alland talked with reporters after his appearance. He said that he was a party member from 1946 to 1949. Alland was a decorated combat pilot in the Air Force, flying 56 missions in the Pacific.

On radio, Alland wrote for Doorway to Life and acted on The Mercury Theatre on the Air.

He died of complications of heart disease.

== Filmography ==
- The Green Goddess (1939) – (uncredited); short film by Orson Welles
- Citizen Kane (1941) – Jerry Thompson (credited); Voice of "News on the March" Newsreel Announcer (uncredited)
- Tom Dick and Harry (1941) – voice of Newsreel Announcer (uncredited)
- The Devil and Daniel Webster (1941) – Guide (uncredited, scenes deleted)
- The Falcon Takes Over (1942) – Reporter (uncredited)
- Riff-Raff (1947) – Trumpy, Man in Cell (uncredited)
- The Lady from Shanghai (1947) – Reporter (uncredited)
- Macbeth (1948) – Second Murderer
- Love Happy (1949) – one of several Story Contributors (uncredited)
- Cave of Outlaws (1951) – Associate Producer
- The Black Castle (1952) – Producer
- The Raiders (1952) – Producer
- The Treasure of Lost Canyon (1952) – Associate Producer
- Flesh and Fury (1952) – Original Story
- The Stand at Apache River (1953) – Producer
- It Came from Outer Space (1953) – Producer
- The Lawless Breed (1953) – Producer
- The Stand at Apache River (1953) – Producer
- The Lawless Breed (1953) – Original Story
- Creature from the Black Lagoon (1954) – Producer, Story Idea (uncredited)
- Johnny Dark (1954) – Producer
- Four Guns to the Border (1954) – Producer
- Dawn at Socorro (1954) – Producer
- This Island Earth (1955) – Producer
- Revenge of the Creature (1955) – Producer, Original Story
- Tarantula (1955) – Producer
- Chief Crazy Horse (1955) – Producer
- The Creature Walks Among Us (1956) – Producer
- The Mole People (1956) – Producer
- The Deadly Mantis (1957) – Producer; Original story
- The Land Unknown (1957) – Producer
- Gun for a Coward (1957) – Producer
- The Colossus of New York (1958) – Producer
- The Space Children (1958) – Producer
- The Lady Takes a Flyer (1958) – Producer
- Raw Wind in Eden (1958) – Producer
- As Young as We Are (1958) – Producer; Original Story
- The Party Crashers (1958) – Producer; Original Story
- Look in Any Window (1961) – Director
- The Lively Set (1964) – Producer
- The Rare Breed (1966) – Producer
