= The Boy and the Pirates =

1960 film

- Theatrical poster
- Directed by: Bert I. Gordon
- Screenplay by: Lillie Hayward; Jerry Sackheim
- Story by: Bert I. Gordon
- Produced by: Bert I. Gordon
- Starring: Charles Herbert; Susan Gordon; Murvyn Vye; Paul Guilfoyle; Joe Turkel; Archie Duncan; Than Wyenn
- Cinematography: Ernest Haller
- Edited by: Jerome Thoms
- Music by: Albert Glasser
- Distributed by: United Artists
- Release date: April 13, 1960
- Running time: 84 minutes
- Language: English

The Boy and the Pirates is a 1960 American adventure film directed by Bert I. Gordon, known as a master of giant monster films. It stars a popular child star Charles Herbert and Gordon's daughter Susan Gordon. The storyline concerns Jimmy Warren and Katrina Van Keif, a boy and girl trapped on Blackbeard's pirate ship.

== Plot ==
A boy named Jimmy Warren who lives along the Massachusetts coast is upset with the unfairness of modern life when his father scolds him about his school grades. He plays on a wrecked ship along the shore with a girl named Kathy Mannering. He picks up an odd brass jar and wishes to be back in the olden days on a pirate ship. When Jimmy utters "Where am I?", the magic jar pops open and a strange little man appears. He introduces himself as Abu the Genie and states that he has granted Jimmy his wish to be on a real pirate ship. Jimmy scoffs at the notion, but Abu insists that they are at that very moment passengers on Queen Anne's Revenge, the pirate ship of the notorious Blackbeard.

Abu refuses to grant Jimmy's wish to go home, and informs him that he must return the brass bottle to the exact spot where he found it within three days, or he will be forced to take the genie's place inside of it. Abu then tries to ensure that Jimmy will fail to do so. Chased by Blackbeard, at the last second Jimmy returns the bottle to the place he found it, and he finds himself returned to the present day. He remembers his adventure, but Kathy is puzzled about his story.

== Cast ==
- Charles Herbert as Jimmy Warren
- Susan Gordon as Katrina Van Keif / Kathy Mannering
- Murvyn Vye as Blackbeard
- Paul Guilfoyle as Snipe
- Joe Turkel as Abu
- Archie Duncan as Scoggins
- Than Wyenn as Hunter
- Albert Cavens as Dutch Captain
- Mickey Finn as Peake
- Morgan Jones as Mr. Warren
- Timothy Carey as Morgan

== Production ==
Charles Herbert recalled: "Timothy Carey on this movie probably scared me more than The Colossus of New York! But he was a nice man, and he always tried to make you feel, 'I'm not really crazy,' and you would say, 'Okay.' And then he would walk away and you'd go, 'He's CRAZY!' He was a scary man. He'd look at me and I would run behind my mother. And I had to catch up to her, because she was tryin' to find somebody else to hide behind!"

== Reception ==
In a brief contemporary review in The New York Times, critic Howard Thompson called The Boy and the Pirates "... a standard, rather cloying little item ... it's all pretty sticky, albeit clean. The kids deserve better."

== Home media ==
The Walt Disney Company's 2006 theatrical release of Johnny Depp's Pirates of the Caribbean: Dead Man's Chest revived interest in pirate films. To take advantage of this, Sony Pictures Home Entertainment released a Midnite Movies double feature DVD set with the rarely seen The Boy and the Pirates and the more recent Crystalstone (1987) on June 27, 2006.

== Comic book adaption ==
- Dell Four Color #1117 (June 1960)

== See also ==
- List of American films of 1960
