= Camille (1921 film) =

1921 silent film

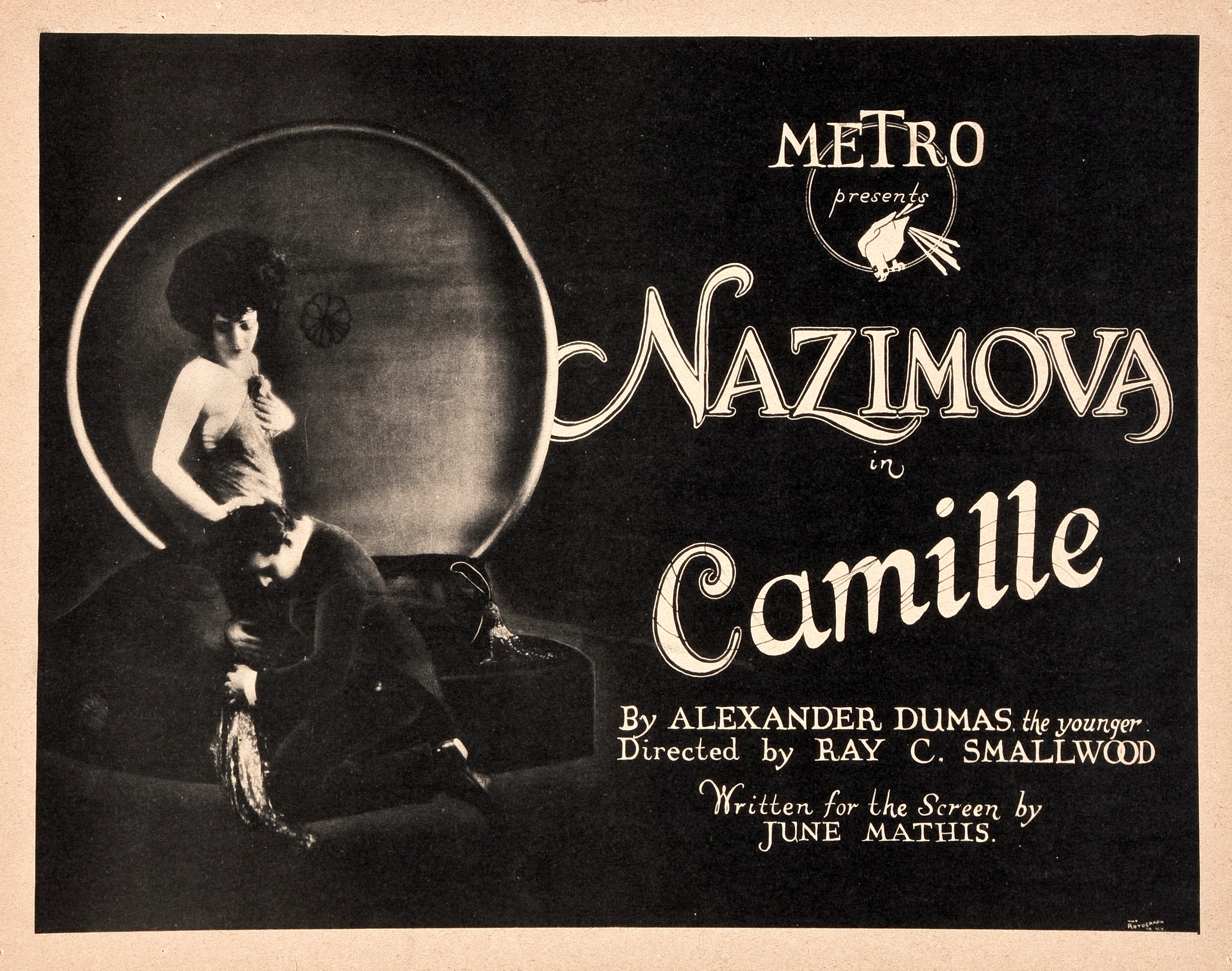
- Lobby card featuring Alla Nazimova and Rudolph Valentino
- Directed by: Ray C. Smallwood
- Screenplay by: June Mathis (scenario)
- Based on: La Dame aux Camélias; 1848 novel by Alexandre Dumas, fils
- Produced by: Alla Nazimova
- Starring: Alla Nazimova; Rudolph Valentino; Rex Cherryman; Arthur Hoyt; Patsy Ruth Miller
- Cinematography: Rudolph J. Bergquist
- Production company: Nazimova Productions
- Distributed by: Metro Pictures Corporation
- Release date: September 26, 1921
- Running time: 70 minutes (contemporary edit)
- Country: United States
- Language: Silent (English intertitles)

Camille

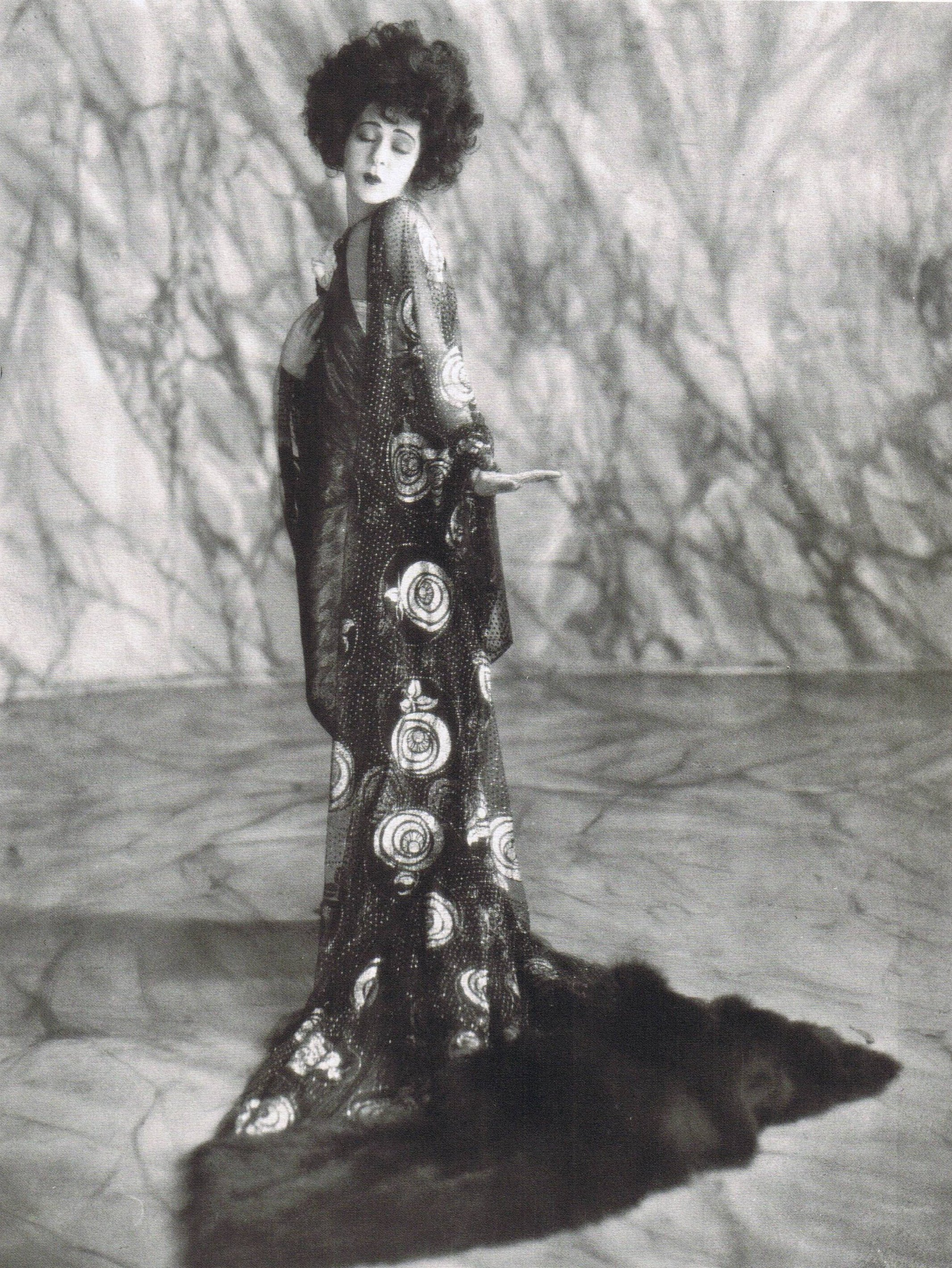
Alla Nazimova as Marguerite Gautier

Camille is a 1921 American silent drama film starring Alla Nazimova as Marguerite and Rudolph Valentino as her lover, Armand. It is based on the play adaptation La Dame aux Camélias (The Lady of the Camellias) by Alexandre Dumas, fils, which was first published in French as a novel in 1848 and as a play in 1852. Camille is one of numerous screen adaptations of Dumas, fils' story. The film is set in 1920s Paris, whereas the original version takes place in Paris in the 1840s. It has lavish Art Deco sets; Rudolph Valentino later married the film's art director, Natacha Rambova.

== Plot ==
Young law student Armand (Rudolph Valentino) is smitten when he sees Marguerite (Alla Nazimova), a courtesan, at the opera. Marguerite is constantly surrounded by suitors, whom she entertains at her lavish apartment. Later, Armand pursues her when he attends one of her private parties. She rejects his advances at first, but eventually returns his affection. Secretly, she has consumption and is frequently beset by bouts of illness.

The two live happily together until Armand's father, seeking to protect his family's reputation, convinces Marguerite to end the relationship. She finally relents and runs away to a wealthy client, leaving a note for Armand.

When Armand finds the note he is shattered. The sorrow eventually turns to rage, and he decides to plunge into Parisian nightlife, associating himself with Olympe, another courtesan. When he sees Marguerite at a casino, he publicly denounces her.

Marguerite gives up her life as a courtesan and quickly finds herself in massive debt. Her illness also takes a heavy toll. Eventually, as she lies dying in bed, her furniture and belongings are repossessed around her. She persuades the men taking her belongings to allow her to keep her most precious possession: a book – Manon Lescaut – Armand had given to her.

Marguerite dies lying in bed in her apartment holding the book Armand gave her, wishing to sleep where she is happy dreaming about Armand. Marguerite's maid Nanine, and her newlywed friends Gaston and Nichette are at her bedside as she dies. Unlike the original novel, the film does not depict Armand and Marguerite ever seeing each other again after the casino scene but it is shown near the end that Armand's father gives him a letter revealing that she did love him, showing both men are remorseful.

== Cast ==
- Rudolph Valentino as Armand Duval
- Alla Nazimova as Marguerite Gautier
- Rex Cherryman as Gaston Rieux
- Arthur Hoyt as Count de Varville
- Zeffie Tilbury as Prudence
- Patsy Ruth Miller as Nichette
- Elinor Oliver as Nanine, Marguerite's Maid
- William Orlamond as Monsieur Duval, Armand's Father
- Consuelo Flowerton as Olympe
- Edward Connelly as The Duke (uncredited)

== Reception ==
Picture-Play Magazine wrote of the film in their August 1921 issue: "The Camille and Armand of tradition are forgotten in the potent lure of the modern characterization of Nazimova and Rudolph Valentino. Bizarre, ephemeral, at moments, and at others, frenzied, their version promises a haunting succession of mesmeric pictures. It does not aim to present the Camille that successive generations have applauded and sniffled over. Because it is Nazimova's presentation of a story that has survived even the buffetings of endless productions—good, bad, and indifferent—it promises to be interesting."

== Preservation ==
The film has survived and is available to the public on DVD by various film distributors and independent dealers. It is presented as a bonus on the DVD copy of the 1936 version Camille with Greta Garbo.
