= Without Warning! =

1952 film by Arnold Laven

- Theatrical release poster
- Directed by: Arnold Laven
- Written by: William Raynor
- Produced by: Arthur Gardner; Jules V. Levy
- Starring: Adam Williams; Meg Randall; Ed Binns
- Narrated by: Gene Wood
- Cinematography: Joseph F. Biroc
- Edited by: Arthur H. Nadel
- Music by: Herschel Burke Gilbert
- Production company: Allart Pictures Corp.
- Distributed by: United Artists
- Release date: May 8, 1952 (United States)
- Running time: 77 minutes
- Country: United States
- Language: English
- Budget: less than $100,000

Without Warning! is a 1952 American film noir crime film directed by Arnold Laven and starring Adam Williams, Meg Randall, and Ed Binns. The film is shot in a semidocumentary style with police procedural voice-over narration in parts. Without Warning! was first released commercially on DVD in 2005.

== Plot ==
Carl Martin resides in the Chavez Ravine neighborhood of Los Angeles, California. He makes his living tending gardens. He also murders young blondes with a pair of shears. Despite police efforts, Martin continues waging his killing spree. Detective Lieutenant Pete Hamilton is assigned the case, assisted by Sergeant Don Ward. They thumb through official files, putting together a list of recent unsolved cases. The victims were all blonde women. They met their deaths around the end of various months. Since it is now the end of the next month, the detectives anticipate another killing. And they are correct. But this time, the elusive murderer is identified by multiple witnesses, including two motorcycle officers. Yet they remember very little regarding the suspect's physical appearance. One officer was knocked out from behind; the other was wounded while chasing the fleeing suspect.

Afterwards, Martin returns to his residence, a shack on a hill overlooking Chavez Ravine. He feels lucky that the police know little about his identity. In the days that come, it will take the death of one additional woman plus the manhandling of another before Hamilton and Ward are able to nail Martin.

== Cast ==
- Adam Williams as Carl Martin
- Meg Randall as Jane Saunders
- Ed Binns as Lt. Pete Hamilton
- Harlan Warde as Police Detective Sgt. Don Warde
- John Maxwell as Fred Saunders
- Angela Stevens as Janet Collier (Blonde)
- Byron Kane as Police Chemist Charlie Wilkins
- Charles Tannen as Wolf
- Marilee Phelps as Virginia
- Robert Foulk as Wilson, Motel Manager
- Connie Vera as Carmelita
- Robert Shayne as Dr. Werner, Police Psychiatrist
- Lee Phelps as "Doc," the Police Coroner
- Arthur Gardner (movie's co-producer) as Jackson, Rapid Transit Cab Co. Driver

== Production ==
Without Warning! was the first film produced by Allart Pictures, an independent company formed by producers Jules V. Levy and Arthur Gardner and director Arnold Laven. The three had met while serving in the First Motion Picture Unit of the United States Army Air Forces during World War II and discussed forming a production company after the war. Financing was provided by investor Josef Auerbach.

William Raynor wrote the story and screenplay. The film's working titles included The Frightened City, The Ripper and The Slasher. The Motion Picture Association of America rejected The Ripper because of its association with Jack the Ripper. Columbia Pictures then objected to The Slasher because of its similarity to the title of Columbia's film The Sniper.

Principal photography took place from October 4 through late October 1951 at Goldwyn Studios and on location in Los Angeles. Locations included the Los Angeles County Sheriff's Office, the county coroner's laboratory, Chavez Ravine and the interchange between the Hollywood Freeway and Harbor Freeway. Laven later said the film's emphasis on police procedures was modeled in part on He Walked by Night (1948), on which he had worked as a script supervisor.

The production was completed on a 15-day principal-photography schedule, followed by three days of second-unit filming. Contemporary columnist Hedda Hopper reported that the picture cost less than $100,000. Allart announced plans to make additional films, but Without Warning! was its only production under that company name. Levy, Gardner and Laven continued their partnership on later films and television programs.

Producer Sol Lesser acquired an interest in the completed film and arranged for United Artists to distribute it.

== Release ==
United Artists scheduled Without Warning! as one of three films it planned to release during May 1952. The film opened in the United States on May 8, 1952. Its copyright was registered to Allart Pictures on the same date.

=== Home media ===
The film was believed unavailable for many years before a surviving print was located and prepared for home-video release. MPI Home Video released it on DVD through its Dark Sky Films label on August 30, 2005. The disc presented the film in its original black-and-white, full-frame format and included a gallery of advertising material.

== Reception ==
A contemporary review in Variety described the film as a case history of a sex killer and considered it suitable for exploitation bookings, though otherwise a grim supporting feature.

In a retrospective review, Glenn Erickson of DVD Talk called the film a memorable example of an independently produced crime thriller. He praised its screenplay and direction, compared it favorably with The Sniper, and wrote that it presented one of the period's more credible portrayals of a psychopathic killer. Erickson also noted the film's use of Los Angeles locations, including the freeway interchange and Chavez Ravine, but found its voice-over narration indebted to the television series Dragnet.

TV Guide rated the film two out of five stars and described it as a capable first feature by its production team, made with a cast of unknown actors.
