= Charles Herbert =

American child actor (1948–2015)

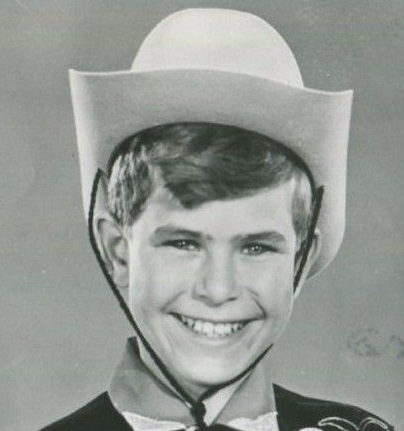
- Herbert, c. 1960
- Born: Charles Herbert Saperstein; December 23, 1948; Culver City, California, U.S.
- Died: October 31, 2015 (aged 66); Las Vegas, Nevada, U.S.
- Occupation: Child actor
- Years active: 1953–1968
- Parent(s): Louis Saperstein; Pearl Diamond Saperstein

Charles Herbert Saperstein (December 23, 1948 – October 31, 2015), known as Charles Herbert, was an American child actor of the 1950s and 1960s. Before reaching his teens, Herbert was renowned by a generation of moviegoers for an on-screen broody, mature style and wit that enabled him to go one-on-one with some of the biggest names in the industry, and his appearances in a handful of films in the sci-fi/horror genre garnered him an immortality there. In six years, he appeared in 20 Hollywood features.

Herbert supported his family from the age of five, and went from being one of the most-desired and highest-paid child actors of his time to one of the multitude of performers Hollywood "discarded" upon reaching maturity. His situation and the lifetime of damage it created for him only recently came to light.

== Early life ==
Herbert was born Charles Herbert Saperstein in Culver City, California, the son of Pearl (Diamond) and Louis Saperstein. According to Herbert, his career began when he was discovered by an agent: "I just happened to be riding on a bus while on a shopping trip with my mother one day, and a gentleman who was a talent agent in Hollywood, named Cosmo Morgan, saw me talking and must have thought I was cute or something. He gave me his card, which I immediately tried to give to the bus driver! That's basically how it started."

Blue-eyed and freckle-faced, Herbert began his acting career at age four, when he appeared on the television series Half Pint Panel (1952). The Long, Long Trailer (1954) would have been his first movie, just after he appeared in the stage production of On Borrowed Time at the Rancho Theatre, but after auditioning with some 40 other kids and chosen for a role, he was cut from the film.

This period was highlighted by a celebrated performance at age eight for his role as a blind child on an episode of Science Fiction Theater (1956). Airing December 22, 1956, "The Miracle Hour" episode is about a man who never gives up hope that his fiancée's blind six-year-old son will not have to spend the holidays in darkness. Herbert starred with Dick Foran and Jean Byron. Five years later, he played the son of a blind man (Rod Steiger) in an episode of NBC's Wagon Train.

== Career ==
Herbert's roles in the 1950s included such popular and cult films as The View from Pompey's Head (1955); The Night Holds Terror (1956); These Wilder Years (1956), with James Cagney and Barbara Stanwyck; Gunfight at the O.K. Corral (1957); The Colossus of New York (1958); The Fly (1958); Houseboat (1958); The Man in the Net (1959), with Alan Ladd; The Five Pennies; Please Don't Eat the Daisies (1960); and 13 Ghosts (1960), in which producer/director William Castle gave him top billing at the age of 12 to secure his services.

Herbert's final feature film and starring role was in The Boy and the Pirates (1960), produced and directed by Bert I. Gordon (Mr. B.I.G.), costarring his daughter Susan. Herbert and Susan Gordon had previously worked together in The Man in the Net (1959), the hospital scene in The Five Pennies (1959), and a TV pilot episode entitled The Secret Life of John Monroe (or The Secret Life of James Thurber). The 30-minute unsold pilot aired as the "Christabel" episode of Alcoa/Goodyear Playhouse, June 8, 1959. Very rarely seen, The Boy and the Pirates was released by Sony Pictures Home Entertainment as a Midnite Movies double DVD set with the more recent Crystalstone (1987), on June 27, 2006.

By 1959, Herbert had achieved a lofty place among the most-desired and highest-paid child actors of his time, making nearly $1,650 per week. He had established for himself both the reputation and the nickname of "One-Take Charlie". Of his acting style, one reviewer described Herbert as "sincere, accurate, overenunciated at times, like a storybook character come to life. An extraordinary child actor by any standard, Herbert’s intense emotive quality is very much of the method acting school, highly unusual in such a young performer."

Herbert's work had him opposite Cary Grant, Sophia Loren, David Niven, Vincent Price, Johnny Carson, Donna Reed, Doris Day, and Ross Martin, for all of whom he had high praise for their treatment of him. "Anybody who is in that category [a well-known actor] who is nice to the children is a nice person. 'Cause I worked with some who were not. Children and animals are not big favorites with movie stars."

Starring screen roles in the 1950s soon evaporated, and Herbert was relegated to TV appearances in the 1960s. In his teenage years Herbert had small roles in Wagon Train (1957), Rawhide (1959), The Twilight Zone (1962), The Fugitive (1963), Hazel (1963), Family Affair (1966), and My Three Sons (1966).

Herbert's career amassed 20 feature films, more than 50 TV shows, and a number of commercials during his 14-year span.

== Personal life ==
Because of the studio attitude toward child actors of the time, Herbert had a keen interest in the child actors of today.

"I lost a lot more than the financial things. Financial things are way down the list for me. The way it’s set up in Hollywood is, I did 50 TV shows, the 20 movies, the commercials, all of that stuff... and when I turned 21, zero had been put away in the bank for me. It was not that way for every [kid actor]: If you signed a long-term contract--for instance, if you did Lassie or The Donna Reed Show or something--they put away like 5 percent for you, but if you were not on a long-term contract, ALL of the money you earned for the movies, for ALL the TV things, went to your guardians; and your guardians could do with it whatever they saw fit."

The only money put away for Herbert until age 21 from his TV and film earnings was $1,700.

Describing his studio education as "nonexistent", Herbert attended public schools (Melrose, Bancroft, Fairfax High) rather than one of the private schools tailored to the unique needs of child actors. "My parents made that mistake, without malice; they were not too familiar [with the problems that child actors face]." Herbert made up a story that he had a twin brother and that it was not him whom his classmates were seeing in movies and on TV. Referring to his role in the sci-fi movie classic The Fly, he said, "Back in those days, the very few people who did know I was an actor, when they were kidding me, they’d go, 'Help me, help me, help meeee!'"...

"Herbert was always happiest and at his best when he was performing. A talented actor, he felt secure and confident when the cameras rolled, but like many child actors, he faced difficulties adjusting to the real world beyond the controlled environment inside the studio walls. The career of a child actor often creates a profoundly troubling lack of identity at a difficult time, just after he has lost his commercial value with the onset of puberty."

Unable to transition into adult roles, Herbert's personal life went downhill. With no formal education or training to do anything else, and with no career earnings saved, he led a reckless, wanderlust life and turned to drugs.

== Final years ==
With no family of his own, Herbert took nearly 40 years to turn his life around. He was clean and sober from August 2004 until his death, and his films, which reached new generations of fans via DVD and cable TV, and his appearances at science-fiction film festivals and conventions, sustained him.

He expressed deep appreciation of the work Paul Petersen's organization, A Minor Consideration, does by assisting present and former child actors both financially and emotionally. Herbert and Petersen played brothers in the film Houseboat (1958), starring Cary Grant and Sophia Loren, and he guest-starred four times as David Barker from 1958 to 1960 on Petersen's ABC series, The Donna Reed Show.

Herbert died of a heart attack in Las Vegas on October 31, 2015.

== Filmography ==
Year	Title	Role	Notes
1954	The Long, Long Trailer	Little Boy	Uncredited
1955	The Night Holds Terror	Steven Courtier	Uncredited
1955	The View from Pompey's Head	Pat Page	Uncredited
1955	Screen Directors Playhouse	Tommy Macy	Episode: "Tom and Jerry"
1956	Ransom!	Butchie Ritter, Neighbor Boy	Uncredited
1956	He Laughed Last	Child	Uncredited
1956	These Wilder Years	Small Boy	Uncredited
1956	Science Fiction Theatre	Tommy Parker	Episode: "The Miracle Hour"
1957	Alfred Hitchcock Presents	Street Kid	Season 2 Episode 31: "The Night the World Ended"
1957	The Tattered Dress	Johnny Blane	Uncredited
1957	Gunfight at the O.K. Corral	Tommy Earp (Virgil's son)	Uncredited
1957	The Monster That Challenged the World	Boy with Morty's Cap	Uncredited
1957	Gun Glory	Boy	Uncredited
1957	No Down Payment	Michael Flagg	Uncredited
1958	The Colossus of New York	Billy Spensser	
1958	The Fly	Philippe Delambre	
1958	The Reluctant Debutante		Uncredited
1958	Houseboat	Robert Winters	
1958–1960	The Donna Reed Show	David Barker	4 episodes
1959	The Man in the Net	Timmie Moreland	
1959	The Five Pennies	Patient	Uncredited
1959	The Last Angry Man	Woody Thrasher Jr.	Uncredited
1959	Riverboat	Paddy Saunders	Episode: "Witness No Evil"
1959–1960	Men into Space	Peter McCauley	7 episodes
1960	The Ann Sothern Show	David	Episode: "Slightly Married"
1960	Please Don't Eat the Daisies	David Mackay	
1960	The Boy and the Pirates	Jimmy Warren	
1960	13 Ghosts	Arthur "Buck" Zorba	
1961	77 Sunset Strip	Lester Embry	Episode: "The Lady Has the Answers"
1961	Wagon Train	Job Bevins	Episode: "The Saul Bevins Story" with Rod Steiger and Vivi Janiss
1961	The 7th Commandment	Crippled boy	Uncredited
1962	The Twilight Zone	Tom Rogers	Episode: "I Sing the Body Electric" S3 E35
1962	The Eleventh Hour	Steve	Episode: "The Seventh Day of Creation"
1963	Going My Way	Kenny	Episode: "The Slasher"
1963	Going My Way	Danny	Episode: "A Tough Act To Follow"
1963	The Fugitive	Cal	Episode: "Nightmare at Northoak"
1963	Hazel	Leslie	Episode: "Hazel's Nest Egg"
1964	The Farmer's Daughter	Arnold	2 episodes
1964	The Outer Limits	Non-credited role: teen-age boy retrieving baseball from Lieutenant Minns.	Episode: "The Inheritors", Part II; Citation: Wikipedia reference to above episode naming Charles Herbert in cast.
1968	Family Affair	Wendell	Episode: "The New Cissy"
1968	Julia	Clyde Whitmarsh	Episode: "Who's a Freud of Ginger Wolfe?", (final appearance)
