= The Sixth Commandment =

1924 film by Christy Cabanne

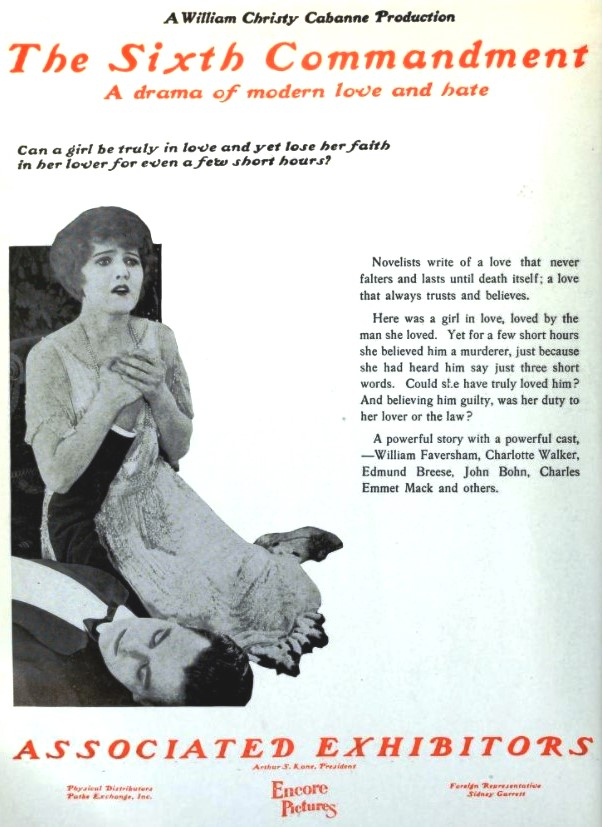
- Advertisement
- Directed by: Christy Cabanne
- Written by: Arthur Hoerl(story); Merritt Crawford(title cards)
- Produced by: Christy Cabanne
- Starring: William Faversham; Charlotte Walker
- Cinematography: Philip Armand; William H. Tuers
- Edited by: Merritt Crawford
- Distributed by: Associated Exhibitors
- Release date: June 1, 1924
- Running time: 60 minutes
- Country: United States
- Language: Silent (English intertitles)

The Sixth Commandment is a lost 1924 American silent drama film directed by Christy Cabanne and starring William Faversham.

== Plot ==
John Brant, a devoted minister, is in love with Marian Calhoun, but must keep it a secret because she is engaged to Robert Fields—who, unknown to Marian, is playing around with a variety of different women. Marian finds out and breaks the engagement.

== Cast ==
- William Faversham as David Brant
- Charlotte Walker as Mrs. Calhoun
- John Bohn as John Brandt
- Kathleen Martyn as Marion Calhoun
- Neil Hamilton as Robert Fields
- Coit Albertson as Dr. Carvel
- Sara Wood as Florence Page
- Consuelo Flowerton as Helen Brooks
- Charles Emmett Mack as Henry Adams
- Edmund Breese as Colonel Saunders
- Anita Louise as (unbilled as Anita Fremault)

== Preservation ==
With no prints of The Sixth Commandment located in any film archives, it is considered a lost film.
