= Look in Any Window =

1961 film by William Alland

- Directed by: William Alland
- Written by: Laurence E. Mascott
- Produced by: William Alland; Laurence E. Mascott
- Starring: Paul Anka; Ruth Roman; Alex Nicol; Gigi Perreau; Carole Mathews; George Dolenz; Jack Cassidy
- Cinematography: W. Wallace Kelley
- Music by: Richard Shores
- Distributed by: Allied Artists
- Release date: January 29, 1961
- Running time: 87 minutes
- Country: United States
- Language: English

Look in Any Window is a 1961 American drama film starring Paul Anka and Ruth Roman. The film was directed by William Alland and released by Allied Artists. It was distributed as part of a double bill with The George Raft Story.

== Plot ==
Craig Fowler, the troubled son of dysfunctional parents Jackie and Jay Fowler, becomes a masked prowler who spies on his neighbors in the suburbs. After he is caught prowling one night, two officers patrol the streets to arrest the prowler. The night before the Fourth of July, Jay is fired from his job as an aircraft mechanic and returns home drunk. While his parents enjoy the night together, Craig goes on a date with his neighbor Eileen Lowell.

Meanwhile, Eileen's philandering father Gareth Lowell has a fracturing marriage with his wife Betty. He drives to Las Vegas with Jackie after Jay passes out drunk. Alone, Betty has an affair with her neighbor Carlo Delisio and stays at his house. With each of their parents missing, Craig and Eileen relax at her pool. Craig attempts to seduce her, but when she resists, she falls over a glass-topped table and suffers a concussion. Although he is panic-stricken, Craig stays as the officers arrive and investigate. Eileen however does not implicate Craig.

The next day, while Eileen recovers, Jackie returns home and asks Craig what he did last night. The officers ask the Lowells to hold a pool party to increase their chances of catching the prowler. Officer Lindstrom suspects Delisio, but Betty verifies he isn't when she admits she was with him last night. When the officers leave, Gareth confronts his wife. Afterwards, they interrogate Craig about his activities last night.

At the pool party, Craig catches his mother making love to Gareth and abruptly leaves, which raises the officers' suspicions. After a fight occurs between Jay and Gareth, Craig is spotted on the rooftops and the officers pursue him. Jackie recognizes the prowler is Craig, and Jay assaults the officers to protect his son. Craig attempts to get away, but he is apprehended. Lindstrom tells Craig's parents that their son will be taken to juvenile hall and placed under psychiatric care. As Craig is taken into custody, Jackie admits she knew that he is the prowler.

== Cast ==
- Paul Anka as Craig Fowler
- Ruth Roman as Jackie Fowler
- Alex Nicol as Jay Fowler
- Gigi Perreau as Eileen Lowell
- Carole Mathews as Betty Lowell
- Jack Cassidy as Gareth Lowell

== Reception ==
Howard Thompson of The New York Times called Look in Any Window "a broadly sensationalized little melodrama" and wrote: "Ugly and even sickening as it becomes, this strange little film may grip some spectators ... it's a miracle that the psychotic young protagonist wasn't carrying on like Jack the Ripper instead."
