= John Baragrey =

American actor (1918–1975)

- Born: April 15, 1918; Haleyville, Alabama
- Died: August 4, 1975 (aged 57); New York City
- Education: University of Alabama
- Occupation: Actor
- Spouse: Louise Larabee

John Baragrey (April 15, 1918 – August 4, 1975) was an American film, television, and stage actor who appeared in many dramatic television series in the 1950s and early 1960s.

== Early years ==
Baragrey was born in Haleyville, Alabama, the son of John Baragrey Sr. and Norma Baragrey. He wanted to be an actor from boyhood. After he graduated from Haleyville High School, his family would not allow him to go to New York, so he worked in a cafe in Russellville, Alabama, for eight months.

After his father died in an accident, Baragrey studied at Massey Business College in Birmingham, Alabama, then took a job as typist and file clerk for Southern Pacific Railroad, a position that he held for three years. He graduated from the University of Alabama in 1939.

Baragrey used his savings to go to New York in 1940. He lived in a small furnished room and initially supported himself by doing typing jobs at night. Later he worked as a waiter at a Schrafft's restaurant, where he "averaged $55 a week with the tips".

He met his wife actress Louise Larabee, while touring with USO shows during World War II.

== Career ==
Baragrey gained early acting experience in stock theater, beginning in 1946 when he joined a stock company headed by José Ferrer. His other stock work included the Bucks County Playhouse, Philadelphia's Playhouse in the Park, and Westport Country Playhouse.

A goiter prevented Baragrey from joining the Army, but he toured the South Pacific with a USO troupe for 11 months, performing in Personal Appearance and Petticoat Fever.

On stage, in films, and especially on television, he teamed up with many of the leading ladies of the era, including Rita Hayworth, Jane Wyman, Jane Powell, Anne Bancroft, Judith Anderson, Tallulah Bankhead, Dolores del Río, and Bette Davis. Yet today he is virtually forgotten, partly because so much of his work was in early television, and many of the tapes of these shows have been lost or were never even recorded.

== Personal life and death ==
Baragrey married Larabee in July 1948. On August 4, 1975, he died at his home in New York City at the age of 57.

== Filmography ==
=== Film ===
- The Loves of Carmen (1948) - Lucas
- The Creeper (1948) - Dr. John Reade
- The Saxon Charm (1948) - Peter Stanhope (uncredited)
- Shockproof (1949) - Harry Wesson
- Swiss Tour (1950) - Jack
- Tall Man Riding (1955) - Cibo Pearlo
- Pardners (1956 - Dan Hollis / Sam Hollis
- The Colossus of New York (1958 - Dr. Henry Spensser
- The Fugitive Kind (1960) - David Cutrere
- Gammera the Invincible (1966) - J.T. Standish

=== Television ===
- Hallmark Hall of Fame (1951)
- The Web (1951)
- Omnibus (1952)
- The Motorola Television Hour (1953–1954)
- Robert Montgomery Presents (1951–1955)
- The Philco Television Playhouse (1948–1955) - Harry Madden / Colonel Brandon / Monroe Stahr / Fitzwilliam Darcy
- Alfred Hitchcock Presents
  - (Season 1 Episode 28: "Portrait of Jocelyn") (1956) - Arthur Clymer / Detective Arbison
  - (Season 2 Episode 23: "One for the Road") (1957) - Charles Hendricks
- The United States Steel Hour (1954–1958) - Tallien / Luvborg
- Studio One (1949–1958) - Chad Hammond / Emcee / Simon Dow / Kurt Meissner / John D'Arcy / John Brooke / John Brooks / Sanin / Reverend Arthur Dimmesdale / Colin Langford
- Kraft Television Theatre (1947–1958) - Edward Rochester
- Playhouse 90 (1957–1959) - Lord Mark / John Parsons Cook
- General Electric Theater (1957–1959) - King Saul / Brandisher
- Play of the Week (1960, episode: "The Potting Shed")
- Thriller (1960–1962) - George Machik / Dr. Ralph Mitchell
- The DuPont Show of the Week (1962) - Judge Advocate
- The Secret Storm - Arthur Rysdale #2 (1962–1964)
- Dark Shadows (1966) - James Blair
- ABC Stage 67 (1967) - Ed Bartlett

=== Stage ===
- Right Next to Broadway (1944)
- A Flag Is Born (1946)
- The Enchanted (1950)
- Pride's Crossing (1950)
- One Eye Closed (1954)
- The Devils (1965)
- The Grass Harp (1971)
- Murderous Angels (1972)
