= The Stand at Apache River =

1953 film by Lee Sholem

- Directed by: Lee Sholem
- Screenplay by: Arthur A. Ross
- Story by: Arthur A. Ross
- Based on: "Apache Landing"; Robert J. Hogan
- Produced by: William Alland
- Starring: Stephen McNally; Julia Adams; Hugh Marlowe
- Cinematography: Charles P. Boyle
- Edited by: Leonard Weiner
- Music by: Frank Skinner
- Color process: Technicolor
- Production company: Universal International Pictures
- Distributed by: Universal Pictures
- Release date: September 1953
- Running time: 77 minutes
- Country: United States
- Language: English

The Stand at Apache River is a 1953 American Western film directed by Lee Sholem and starring Stephen McNally, Julia Adams and Hugh Marlowe.

== Plot ==
Sheriff Lane Dakota captures robbery-murder suspect Greiner just us the latter is wounded in an Apache ambush. At remote outpost Apache River, Lane and his prisoner spend the night with other travelers, including two women with a surprising number of fancy dresses.

== Cast ==
- Stephen McNally as Lane Dakota
- Julia Adams as Valerie Kendrick
- Hugh Marlowe as Colonel Morsby
- Jaclynne Greene as Ann Kenyon
- Hugh O'Brian as Tom Kenyon
- Russell Johnson as Greiner
- Jack Kelly as Hatcher
- Edgar Barrier as Cara Blanca
- Forrest Lewis as Deadhorse

== Bibliography ==
- Gene Blottner. Universal-International Westerns, 1947-1963: The Complete Filmography. McFarland, 2000.
