= Adam Williams (actor) =

American actor

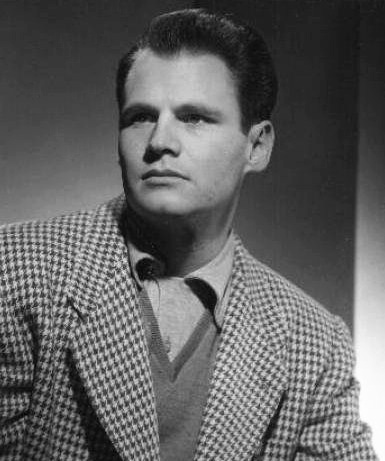
- Adam Williams in Without Warning, 1952
- Born: Adam William Berg; November 26, 1922; Wall Lake, Iowa, U.S.
- Died: December 4, 2006 (aged 84); Los Angeles, California, U.S.
- Occupations: Film and television actor, flight school owner
- Years active: 1951–1978
- Spouses: Marilee Phelps (?–1970; 3 children); Carole Berg (1974–2006; 3 children, 4 stepchildren)

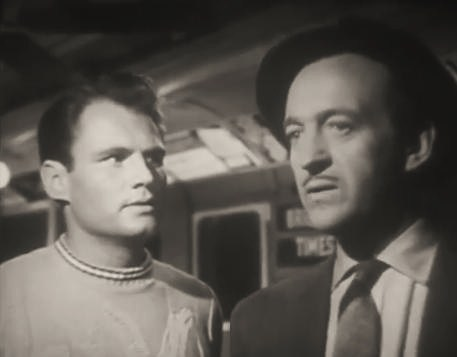
Adam Williams (left) and David Niven on TV's Four Star Playhouse, episode "Night Ride" (1953)

Adam Williams (born Adam William Berg; November 26, 1922 – December 4, 2006) was an American film and television actor.

== Early life ==
Williams was born Adam William Berg in Wall Lake, Iowa, and likely raised in New York.

== Career ==
A veteran "bad guy" actor of 1950s film and TV, Williams began his career after distinguished World War II military service as a United States Navy pilot, for which he received the Navy Cross. Berg was commended for his valor while operating a dive bomber off the USS Wasp in June 1944, in which he attacked a Japanese fleet oiler in the East Philippine Sea, and ditched upon his return without suffering casualties to his crew. An accomplished pilot, Williams also served the general aviation community as a fixed wing Designated Pilot Examiner (DPE) for the FAA.

In 1952, Williams played the lead, as a Los Angeles woman killer, in the film Without Warning! In 1953, he was cast as Larry, a car bomber, in The Big Heat. He had a leading role in the 1958 science fiction movie The Space Children. Other notable film roles include the psychiatrist in Fear Strikes Out (1957) and Valerian in Alfred Hitchcock's North by Northwest (1959).

During the 1950s and 1960s, he appeared on dozens of television series, including the syndicated The Sheriff of Cochise, set in Arizona and starring John Bromfield, and Have Gun – Will Travel in the episode "The Reasonable Man". He portrayed private detective and murderer Jason Beckmeyer in the 1957 Perry Mason episode "The Case of the Runaway Corpse." In 1961, he was cast as Jim Gates in the episode "Frontier Week" on Joanne Dru's sitcom Guestward, Ho!, set on a dude ranch in New Mexico. In 1960, he appeared in The Twilight Zone season 1 episode "The Hitch-Hiker", starring Inger Stevens. He also appeared in the Twilight Zone episode "A Most Unusual Camera".

Between 1959 and 1967 he appeared in six episodes of The Rifleman and in four episodes of Bonanza, and in 1961 as Adam in "A Rope for Charlie Munday", in the ABC adventure series The Islanders. He was cast as Burley Keller in the 1961 episode "The Persecuted" of the ABC/Warner Brothers western series Lawman. He guest-starred in an episode of the 1961 NBC series The Americans, based on family conflicts stemming from the American Civil War, and in an episode of the 1961 series The Asphalt Jungle. One of his later roles was in the 1976 television movie Helter Skelter.

== Death ==
On December 4, 2006, Williams died in Los Angeles of lymphoma at the age of 84. His body was cremated.

== Selected filmography ==
- Queen for a Day (1951) - Chuck, High Diver segment
- Flying Leathernecks (1951) - Lieutenant Bert Malotke
- Without Warning! (1952) - Carl Martin
- Vice Squad (1953) - Marty Kusalich
- The Big Heat (1953) - Larry Gordon
- Dragonfly Squadron (1954) - Captain Wyler
- The Yellow Tomahawk (1954) - Corporal Maddock
- Crashout (1955) - Fred Summerfield
- The Sea Chase (1955) - Kruger, Wireless Operator (uncredited)
- The Proud and Profane (1956) - Eustace Press
- The Rack (1956) - Sergeant Otto Pahnke
- Fear Strikes Out (1957) - Dr. Brown
- The Garment Jungle (1957) - Ox
- The Oklahoman (1957) - Bob Randell
- The Lonely Man (1957) - Lon
- Alfred Hitchcock Presents (1958) (Season 3 Episode 32: "Listen, Listen...!") - Police Lieutenant King
- Darby's Rangers (1958) - Heavy Hall
- The Space Children (1958) - Dave Brewster
- The Badlanders (1958) - Leslie
- North by Northwest (1959) - Valerian
- The Twilight Zone (1960) S1E16, "The Hitchhiker" - sailor on leave
- The Twilight Zone (1960) S2E10: "A Most Unusual Camera" - Woodward (for unknown reasons, this episode did not air until season 2)
- Thriller (1961) (Season 1 episode "Yours Truly, Jack the Ripper") - Hymie
- The Last Sunset (1961) - Calverton
- Gunsmoke (1962) (S7E15 "The Do-Badder") - Slim Trent
- Alfred Hitchcock Presents (1962) (Season 7 Episode 30: "What Frightened You, Fred?") - Dr. Cullen
- Convicts 4 (1962) - Guard #1
- The Rifleman (1963) (S5 E24 "Old Man Running") - Mal Sherman
- Gunfight at Comanche Creek (1963) - Jed Hayden
- The New Interns (1964) - Wolanski
- The Glory Guys (1965) - Private Lucas Crain
- The Horse in the Gray Flannel Suit (1968) - Sergeant Roberts
- Helter Skelter (1976) - Terrence Milik
