= The Lawless Breed =

1953 film by Raoul Walsh

- Theatrical release poster
- Directed by: Raoul Walsh
- Screenplay by: Bernard Gordon
- Story by: William Alland
- Produced by: William Alland; Raoul Walsh
- Starring: Rock Hudson; Julia Adams
- Cinematography: Irving Glassberg
- Edited by: Frank Gross
- Music by: Herman Stein (composer); Joseph Gershenson (music supervisor)
- Production company: Universal-International
- Distributed by: Universal-International
- Release date: January 3, 1953 (United States)
- Running time: 83 minutes
- Country: United States
- Language: English
- Box office: $1.3 million (US)

The Lawless Breed is a 1953 American biographical crime Western film produced and distributed by Universal-International, directed by Raoul Walsh, starring Rock Hudson and Julia Adams. The film is a romanticized story based on the life of outlaw John Wesley Hardin.

== Plot ==
Wild West gunslinger and gambler John Wesley Hardin is pardoned and released from a Huntsville, Texas prison in 1896, after serving 16 years of a 25-year sentence.

He delivers a manuscript of his life, written during his incarceration, to a local printer, in the hopes of it being printed. The film's story is presented mostly as flashbacks, as the autobiography recounts Hardin's exploits outside the law.

It tells of an upbringing by his preacher father, and his first love Jane; in his reckless youth he finds solace from his complicated home life in gambling. However, he is introduced to the outlaw life when he shoots a man in self-defense during a card game, and is soon on the run when authorities, and the man's notorious brothers, come gunning for him. He finds aid from a saloon girlfriend Rosie and his uncle John Clements. After Jane is killed in an accident outside his father's home, brought on by the pursuit and Hardin's desire to bring her with him, he and Rosie depart together. On the run across state lines and using aliases, they eventually wed and begin a normal life, and have a son just before he is finally tracked down, captured and sent to prison.

After his release, he returns home and reunites with Rosie and his now teenage son John. His life as an outlaw has influenced his son, but upon his release, Hardin makes clear to the young man that a life of crime is no way to live.

== Cast ==
- Rock Hudson as John Wesley Hardin
- Julia Adams as Rosie
- Mary Castle as Jane Brown
- John McIntire as J.G. Hardin / John Clements
- Hugh O'Brian as Ike Hanley
- Dennis Weaver as Jim Clements
- Forrest Lewis as Zeke Jenkins
- Lee Van Cleef as Dirk Hanley
- Tom Fadden as Chick Noonan
- Race Gentry as John Hardin Jr.
- Richard Garland as Joe Clements
- Glenn Strange as Ben Hanley
- William Pullen as Joe Hardin
- Michael Ansara as Gus Hanley (uncredited)

Francis Ford, the brother of director John Ford, has a small uncredited role as a saloon janitor.

== Home media ==
Universal first released the film on DVD in 2007 as part of its Classic Western Round-Up, Volume 1 set, a 2-disc set featuring three other films (The Texas Rangers, Canyon Passage, and Kansas Raiders). The exact same set was re-released in 2011, as part of Universal's 4 Movie Marathon DVD series, being repackaged as the "Classic Western Collection". In 2015, the film re-released as a stand-alone DVD from the Universal Vault Series; the only difference in this release was that no subtitles were provided on-screen. There are also Region 2 and Region 4 DVD releases of this film.
