= Pamela Baird =

American former actress

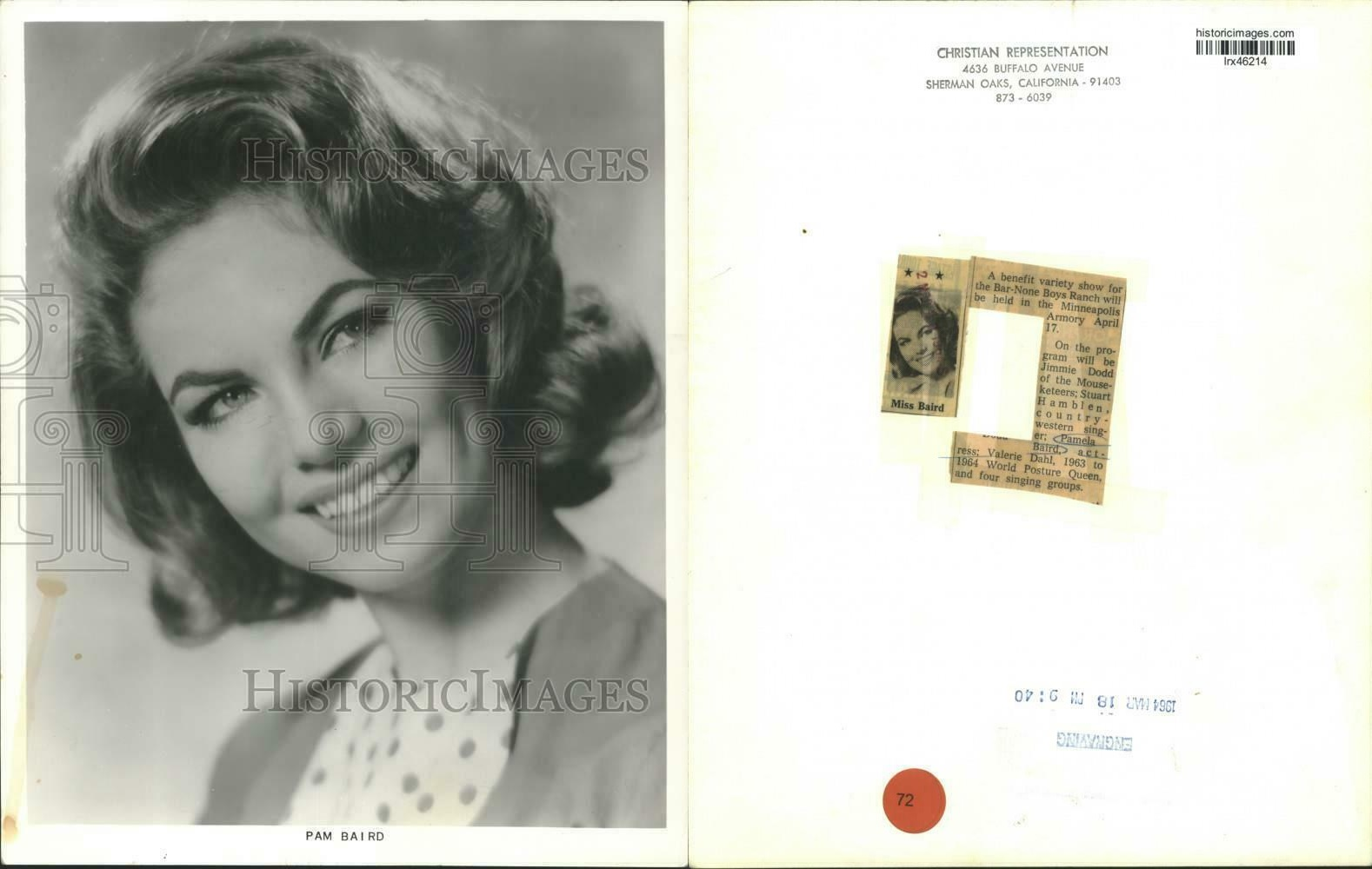
- Baird in 1964
- Born: Bexar County, Texas, U.S.
- Other names: Pamela Beaird; Pamela Beaird Hensley
- Occupation: Actress
- Years active: 1955–1964; 1987
- Spouses: Robert H. Hensley (m. 1973; died 2016)
- Children: 5

Pamela Baird (born Pamela Beaird) is a former television actress, best remembered for playing Mary Ellen Rogers, the girlfriend of Wally Cleaver on Leave It to Beaver.

== Early years ==
Baird was born in San Antonio. She attended Westminster Choir College, Princeton, New Jersey, for two years.

== Acting career ==
Her first recurring role was of Hildy Broeberg on the 1956–1957 western series My Friend Flicka. She played Nancy, one of Kelly's (Noreen Corcoran) friends on the sitcom Bachelor Father from 1957 to 1962.

Baird is best known for her role as "Mary Ellen Rogers", the girlfriend of Wally Cleaver on Leave It to Beaver from 1957 to 1963. Her last acting roles were guest appearances on Mr. Novak and Perry Mason in 1964.

== Later life ==
In January 1973, Baird became reacquainted with Robert H. Hensley, a friend from the Hollywood Christian Group. Hensley had been an actor, using the professional name of Bob Henry. He also recorded songs, using the name Jericho Brown, and in 1960 he had a top ten hit, “Look for a Star”.

The couple married, had five children, and the family traveled the country starting churches and singing Gospel songs. In 2005, Baird (Pamela Beaird Hensley) earned a degree in music from Southwestern Assemblies of God University. Her husband died on May 22, 2016.
