= Anita Louise =

American actress (1915–1970)

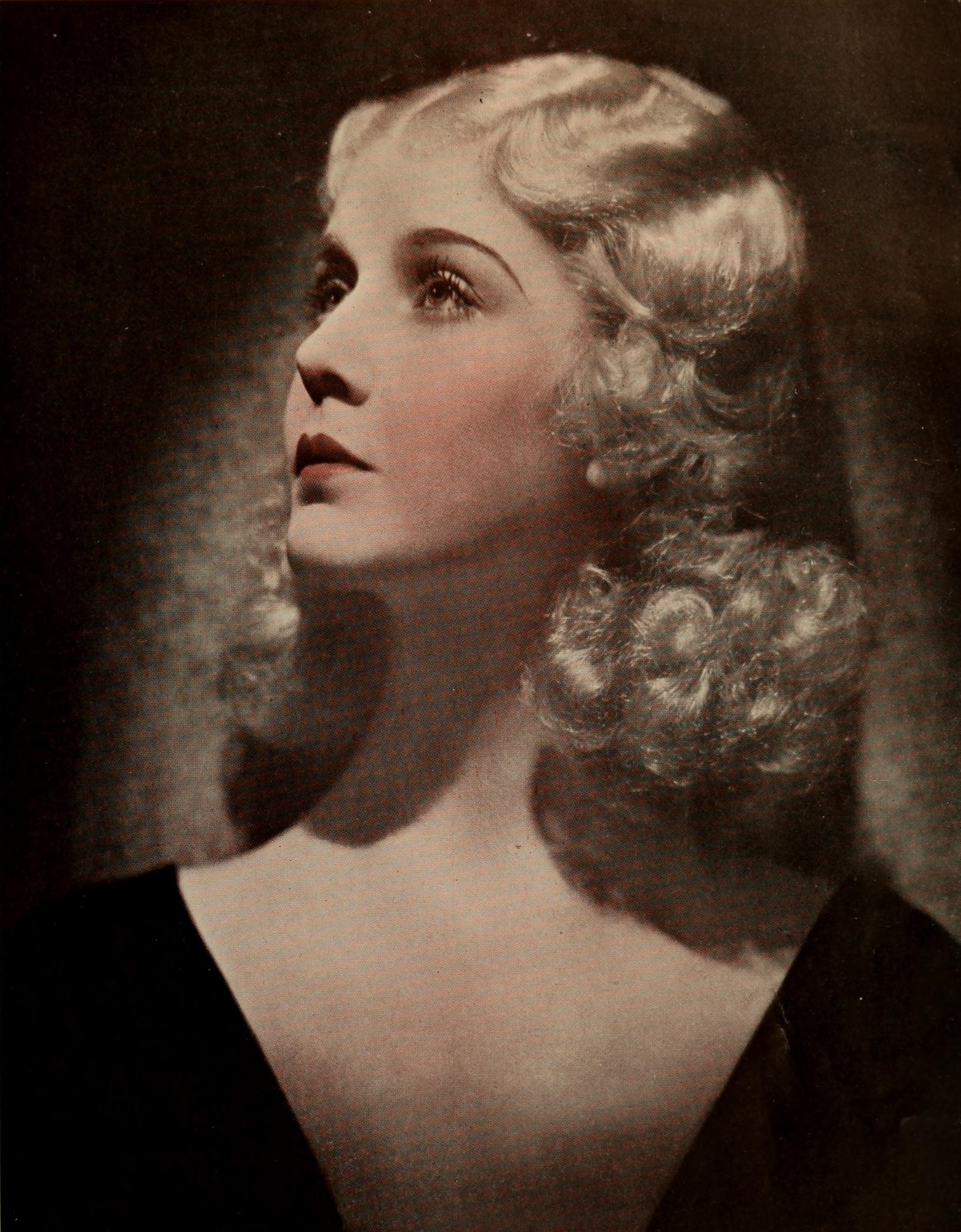
- Louise in 1931
- Born: Anita Louise Fremault; January 9, 1915; New York City, U.S.
- Died: April 25, 1970 (aged 55); Los Angeles, California, U.S.
- Resting place: Forest Lawn Memorial Park, Glendale
- Other name: Anita Fremault
- Occupation: Actress
- Years active: 1922–1970
- Spouses: Buddy Adler (m. 1940; died 1960) Henry Berger (m. 1962)
- Children: 2

Anita Louise (born Anita Louise Fremault; January 9, 1915 – April 25, 1970) was an American film and television actress best known for her performances in A Midsummer Night's Dream (1935), The Story of Louis Pasteur (1935), Anthony Adverse (1936), Marie Antoinette (1938), and The Little Princess (1939). She was named as a WAMPAS Baby Star.

== Life and career ==
Louise was born on January 9, 1915, in New York City, the daughter of Louis and Ann Fremault. She attended the Professional Children's School. She made her acting debut on Broadway at the age of seven, in Peter Ibbetson. Louise appeared in the 1922 film Down to the Sea in Ships. She made her first credited screen debut at the age of nine in the film The Sixth Commandment (1924). In 1929, Louise dropped her surname, billing herself only by first and second names.

In the same 1937 St. Louis Star-Times interview referenced above, she is quoted as saying: "When I was nine...Mother and I walked out of the Bristol Hotel in Vienna and I was lifted off my feet by a man, who ran a few steps and threw me, bodily, into a waiting automobile...two hotel attaches came to the rescue...The hotel manager warned my mother that thirty children had been seized and hurried across the Italian frontier where they were sold...later to become white slaves when old enough."

As her stature in Hollywood grew, she was named a WAMPAS Baby Star. Her reputation was enhanced by her role as Hollywood society hostess, with her parties attended by the elite of Hollywood and widely and regularly reported in the news media.

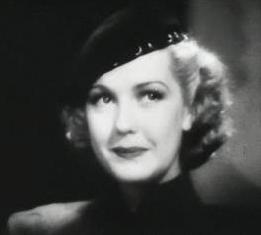
Louise in Call It a Day (1937)

Among her film successes were Madame Du Barry (1934), A Midsummer Night's Dream (1935), The Story of Louis Pasteur (1935), Anthony Adverse (1936), Marie Antoinette (1938), The Sisters (1938), and The Little Princess (1939).

By the 1940s, she was reduced to mostly secondary roles, and her film career started to slow. Some of her films during this time are Casanova Brown (1944), Nine Girls (1944), The Bandit of Sherwood Forest (1946), Blondie's Big Moment (1947), and Bulldog Drummond at Bay (1947). Her last appearance in movies was in the 1952 war film Retreat, Hell!

Reduced to minor roles, she acted infrequently until the advent of television in the 1950s provided her with further opportunities. She played Nell McLaughlin in the television series My Friend Flicka from 1956 to 1957, with co-stars Johnny Washbrook, Gene Evans, and Frank Ferguson. She was substitute host of The Loretta Young Show (1953) when Loretta Young was recuperating from surgery. In 1957, she was host of Theater Time on ABC-TV. Other shows which she hosted included The United States Steel Hour (1962) and Playhouse 90 (1957). Her last television appearance was in a 1970 episode of The Mod Squad.

== Personal life and death ==
Louise's husband, film producer Buddy Adler, whom she married on May 18, 1940, died in 1960. They had two children. She married Henry Berger in 1962. Louise died of a stroke at the age of 55, on April 25, 1970, in Los Angeles, California. She was buried next to Adler at the Forest Lawn Memorial Park in Glendale, California.

Louise has a star at 6821 Hollywood Boulevard in the Motion Pictures section of the Hollywood Walk of Fame in recognition of her contribution to films.

== Filmography ==
=== Film ===
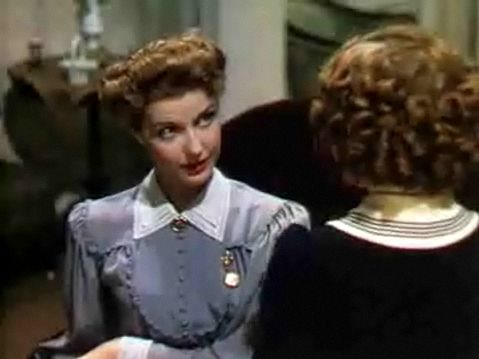
Louise in The Little Princess (1939)

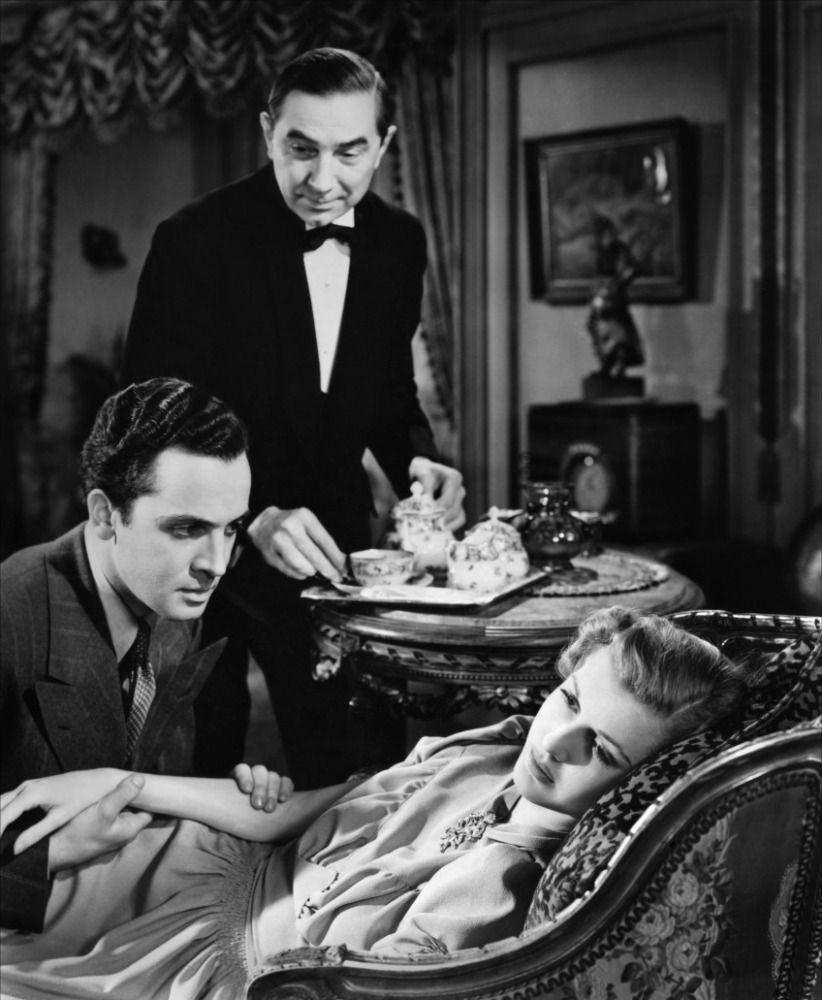
Anita Louise in The Gorilla (1939)

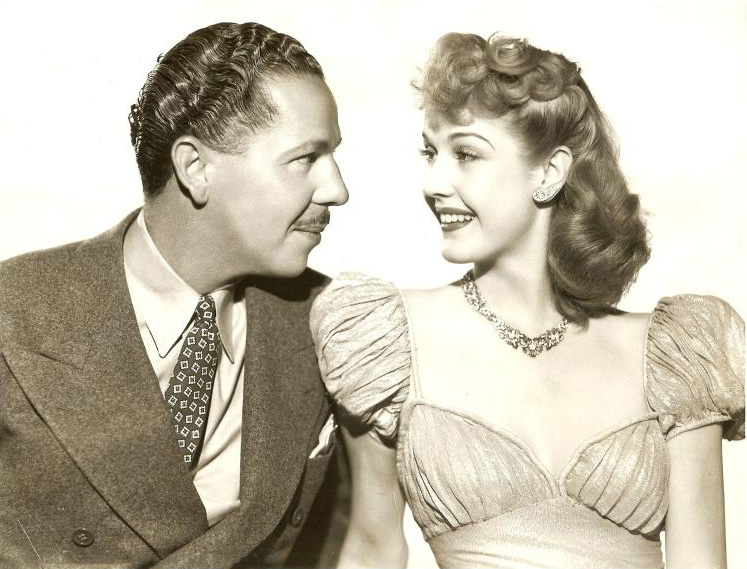
Louise with Roger Pryor in Glamour for Sale (1940)

Year	Title	Role	Notes
1922	Down to the Sea in Ships		Uncredited
1924	The Sixth Commandment		Lost film
1924	Lend Me Your Husband		
1925	The Street of Forgotten Men	Flower Girl	Uncredited; Incomplete film, missing reel 2
1926	The Untamed Lady		Lost film
1927	The Music Master		Lost film
1927	Memories		Short subject
1928	4 Devils	Louise	Lost film
1928	A Woman of Affairs	Diana as a Child	Uncredited
1929	The Spirit of Youth	Toodles Ewing	
1929	Square Shoulders	Mary Jane Williams	
1929	Wonder of Women	Lottie	Lost film
1929	The Marriage Playground	Blanca Wheater	
1930	The Florodora Girl	Vibart Child	
1930	What a Man	Marion Kilbourne	
1930	Just Like Heaven	Mimi Martell	
1930	The Third Alarm	Milly Morton	
1931	The Great Meadow	Betty Hall	
1931	Millie	Constance 'Connie' Maitland	
1931	Everything's Rosie	Rosie Droop	
1931	The Woman Between	Helen Weston	
1931	Heaven On Earth	Towhead	
1932	The Phantom of Crestwood	Esther Wren	
1933	Our Betters	Elizabeth 'Bessie' Saunders	
1934	The Most Precious Thing in Life	Patty O'Day	
1934	Are We Civilized?	Norma Bockner	
1934	Madame DuBarry	Marie Antoinette	
1934	Cross Streets	Clara Grattan	
1934	I Give My Love	Lorna March	
1934	Judge Priest	Ellie May Gillespie	
1934	The Firebird	Mariette Pointer	
1934	Bachelor of Arts	Mimi Smith	
1935	Lady Tubbs	Wynne Howard	
1935	Here's to Romance	Lydia Lubov	
1935	A Midsummer Night's Dream	Titania, Queen of the Fairies	
1935	Personal Maid's Secret	Diana Abercrombie	
1936	The Story of Louis Pasteur	Annette Pasteur	
1936	Brides Are Like That	Hazel Robinson	
1936	Anthony Adverse	Maria	
1937	Green Light	Phyllis Dexter	
1937	Call It a Day	Joan Collett, the maid	
1937	The Go Getter	Margaret Ricks	
1937	That Certain Woman	Florence 'Flip' Carson Merrick	
1937	First Lady	Emmy Page	
1937	Tovarich	Helene Dupont	
1938	My Bill	Muriel Colbrook	
1938	Marie Antoinette	Princesse de Lamballe	
1938	The Sisters	Helen Elliot Johnson	
1938	Going Places	Ellen Parker	
1939	The Little Princess	Rose Hamilton	
1939	The Gorilla	Norma Denby	
1939	These Glamour Girls	Daphne 'Daph' Graves	
1939	Hero for a Day	Sylvia Higgins	
1939	Main Street Lawyer	Honey Boggs	
1939	Reno	Mrs. Joanne Ryder	
1940	Wagons Westward	Phyllis O'Conover	
1940	Glamour for Sale	Ann Powell	
1940	The Villain Still Pursued Her	Mary Wilson	
1941	The Phantom Submarine	Madeline Neilson	
1941	Two in a Taxi	Bonnie	
1941	Harmon of Michigan	Peggy Adams	
1943	Dangerous Blondes	Julie Taylor	
1944	Nine Girls	Paula Canfield	
1944	Casanova Brown	Madge Ferris	
1945	Love Letters	Helen Wentworth	
1946	The Fighting Guardsman	Amelie de Montrevel	
1946	The Bandit of Sherwood Forest	Lady Catherine Maitland	
1946	The Devil's Mask	Janet Mitchell	
1946	Personality Kid	Laura Howard	
1946	Shadowed	Carol Johnson	
1947	Blondie's Big Moment	Miss Gary	
1947	Bulldog Drummond at Bay	Doris Hamilton	
1952	Retreat, Hell!	Ruth Hansen	

=== Television ===
Year	Title	Role	Notes
1950	Stars Over Hollywood		Episode: "Landing at Daybreak"
1952	Footlights Theater		1 episodes
1952–1955	The Ford Television Theatre	Mother / Marie McCoy / Mrs. Lindsey	3 episodes
1953	Your Favorite Story	Julia	Episode: "The Magician"
1955	Lux Video Theatre	Beatrice Page	Episode: "Forever Female"
1956	My Friend Flicka	Nell McLaughlin	39 episodes
1956	Ethel Barrymore Theatre		Episode: "Dear Miss Lovelace"
1957	The Millionaire	Nancy Wellington	Episode: "The Nancy Wellington Story"
1957	Playhouse 90	Mabel Seymour Greer	Episode: "The Greer Case"
1957	Letter to Loretta	Laura	Episode: "Power Play"
1962	The United States Steel Hour	Mrs. McCabe	Episode: "Far from the Shade Tree"
1969	Mannix	Althea Greene	Episode: "Missing: Sun and Sky"
1970	The Mod Squad	Grace Cochran	Episode: "Call Back Yesterday", (final appearance)
