= Johnny Washbrook =

Canadian-American film and television actor

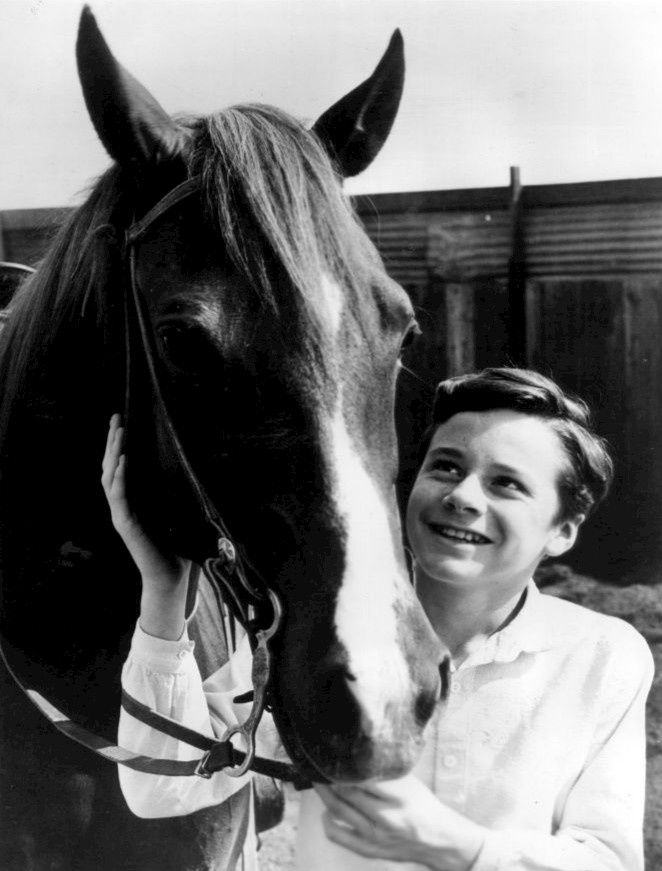
- Washbrook (right) in My Friend Flicka, 1962
- Born: October 16, 1944 (age 81); Toronto, Ontario, Canada
- Occupations: Film and television actor
- Years active: 1953–1980

Johnny Washbrook (born October 16, 1944) is a Canadian-American film and television actor. He is best known for playing Ken McLaughlin in the American western television series My Friend Flicka.

== Life and career ==
Washbrook was born in Toronto, Ontario. He began his career in 1953, appearing in the television series Encounter. In 1956, Washbrook starred in the western television series My Friend Flicka, which aired on CBS. After the series ended, Washbrook guest-starred in television programs including Trackdown, The Donna Reed Show, My Three Sons, Wagon Train, The Millionaire, Perry Mason and Dr. Kildare. He also played the recurring role of Eddy Burke in Hazel.

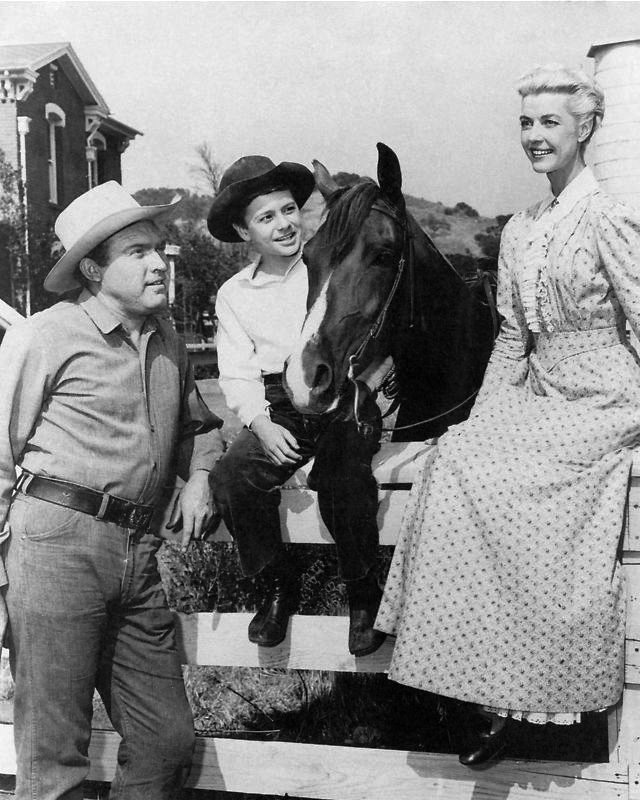
Washbrook (center) with Gene Evans and Anita Louise in My Friend Flicka, 1957

Washbrook appeared in three films: Lonelyhearts, A Nightingale Sang in Berkeley Square and The Space Children, in which he co-starred and played Tim Gamble.
