= Green Goddess (disambiguation) =

Green Goddess refers to the Bedford RLHZ Self Propelled Pump, a fire engine used by the British Armed Forces.

Green Goddess may also refer to:

== Arts and entertainment ==
- The Green Goddess (play), a 1920s stage play by William Archer
  - The Green Goddess (1923 film), an American silent film adaptation of the play
  - The Green Goddess (1930 film), an American talking picture remake of the 1923 film
  - The Green Goddess, a lost short film by Orson Welles, a prelude to his 1939 version of the play
- Green goddess, a fictional entity in the 1935 film serial The New Adventures of Tarzan and 1938 film Tarzan and the Green Goddess
- The Green Goddess, a 2001 album by Diabolique

== Transportation ==
- Green Goddess (locomotive), on the Romney, Hythe and Dymchurch Railway, Kent, England
- Green Goddess (trams), ex-Liverpool trams in Glasgow, Scotland, in the 1950s
- Green Goddess, an early trolleybus in Adelaide, Australia
- Green Goddess, a 1948 Docker Daimler car
- RMS Caronia (1947), nicknamed Green Goddess, a Cunard cruise ship with a distinctive green livery

== Other uses ==
- Green goddess dressing, a salad dressing containing anchovies
- Green goddess (salad), or Watergate salad
- 'Green goddess', a cultivar of Zantedeschia aethiopica calla lily
- 'Green goddess', a variety of cauliflower
- Green Goddess, a version of a GI cocktail
- Diana Moran (born 1939), nicknamed the Green Goddess, an English model, fitness expert and journalist
- Kenkyusha's New Japanese-English Dictionary, nicknamed "Green Goddess" for its distinctive dark-green cover
