= Consuelo Flowerton =

American actress and model (1900–1965)

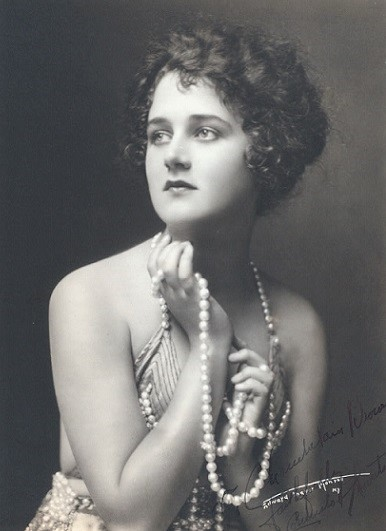
- Born: August 9, 1900; New York City, New York, U.S.
- Died: December 21, 1965 (aged 65); New York City, New York, U.S.
- Occupations: Actress, model
- Spouse(s): Dirk Foch (m. 1923; div. 1926) Robert E. Cushman (m. 1963; died 1965)
- Children: Nina Foch

Consuelo Flowerton (August 9, 1900 – December 21, 1965) was an American actress and model of the early twentieth century. During and after World War I, she was known as the "war poster girl" because she appeared on widely distributed propaganda posters drawn by Howard Chandler Christy. She appeared in the silent films The Sixth Commandment (1924) and Camille (1921), and performed with the Ziegfeld Follies in 1921.

== Early life ==
Flowerton was born on August 9, 1900 to Maud (Valot) and Alexander Flowerton. Alexander Flowerton was the Commissioner for India at the 1893 Chicago World's Fair. Maud Valot was born in Halifax, Nova Scotia, Canada, a pioneer in women's suffrage, and active in politics and social work such as President Wilson's presidential campaign and assisting the underprivileged throughout her life. Consuelo had one sister, Alexandra, who later became the Baroness Guglielmo Terraciano of Naples.

== Career ==
During World War I, Flowerton appeared on several widely circulated propaganda posters by Howard Chandler Christy, including those supporting the Red Cross and encouraging Americans to ration food and purchase Liberty bonds. This led to her gaining the nicknames "poster girl" and "war poster girl."

In 1921, Flowerton performed with the Ziegfeld Follies. She went on to perform in several Broadway productions, originating roles in Remote Control (1929) and Let 'Em Eat Cake (1933). She also appeared as Olympe in the silent film Camille (1921), based on the novel La Dame aux Camélias by Alexandre Dumas, fils.

Flowerton stopped acting upon her marriage in 1923, but resumed her career after separating from her husband, musician Dirk Foch.

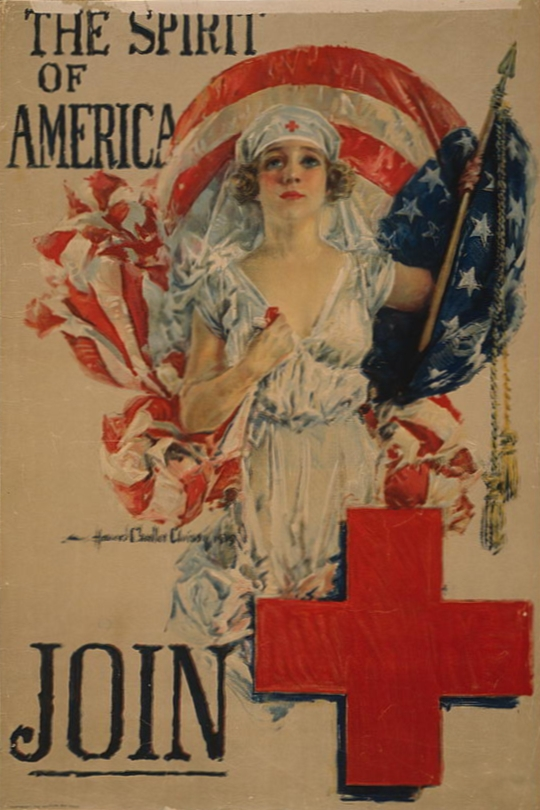
WWI poster by Howard Chandler Christy featuring Flowerton.

=== Filmography ===
- In a Music Shoppe (1928)
- The Sixth Commandment (1924)
- Camille (1921)

=== Theatrical roles ===
- Let 'Em Eat Cake (1933)
- Melody (1933)
- The Sex Fable (1931)
- Six Characters in Search of an Author (1931)
- An American Tragedy (1931)
- Lysistrata (1930)
- Remote Control (1929)
- Queen o' Hearts (1922)
- Good Morning Dearie (1921)
- Ziegfeld Follies of 1921 (1921)

== Private life and death ==
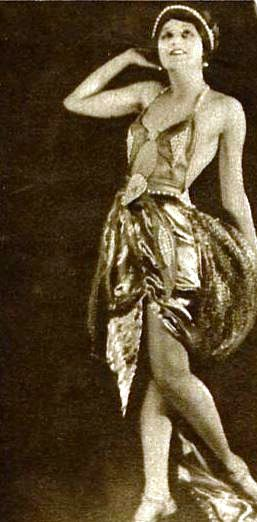
Flowerton in a still from Camille (1921)

In 1921, it was rumored that Flowerton was engaged to her sister Alexandra's former fiancé, Lieutenant Louis F. Kloor, but her mother denied these reports.

Flowerton married Dutch orchestra conductor and composer Dirk Foch in 1923. The pair had one daughter, Nina Foch, who later became an actress. Their relationship was widely publicized and romanticized, with newspapers alleging that Foch had been in love with Flowerton ever since he first saw her on a World War I poster, and had been searching for "the talented beauty whose face he had never been able to forget." The couple moved to Vienna, where Foch worked as the conductor of the Vienna Concert Society.

Flowerton divorced Foch in the Hague, Netherlands, in 1926, and the couple shared custody of their daughter. They had reportedly experienced financial difficulties after struggling to maintain their lavish lifestyle on Foch's income alone.

In 1932, Flowerton alleged that Foch had been unfaithful, and she obtained a divorce from him in American courts, along with full custody of their daughter. Like their initial romance, Flowerton and Foch's divorce was also widely publicized, with The Salt Lake Tribune publishing a full-page story on their split.

Flowerton married Robert E. Cushman, a retired banker and lawyer, in 1963. She died of cancer at the New York Infirmary in December 1965 at the age of 65.
