= GI cocktail =

Mixture of pharmaceutical drugs

A gastrointestinal cocktail, (also known as a GI cocktail or gastric cocktail), is a mixture of medications used to treat symptoms of dyspepsia. The GI cocktail generally contains a mixture of viscous lidocaine, an antacid, and an anticholinergic. The GI cocktail is commonly prescribed in the hospital or emergency department, and has been used to help distinguish chest pain as either gastrointestinal or cardiac. While it has been widely used in the treatment of dyspepsia, studies have suggested that the GI cocktail is only as effective as antacids alone.

The "GI cocktail" does not refer to a specific product. Rather, it refers to a mixture of viscous lidocaine, an antacid, and an anticholinergic. Viscous lidocaine works as an anesthetic to numb pain in the throat, esophagus, and stomach. Antacids work to neutralize stomach acid. Anticholinergics work to ease symptoms that accompany dyspepsia including nausea, vomiting, and abdominal cramping.

== Medical uses ==
The GI cocktail is commonly prescribed in the hospital or emergency department to treat symptoms of dyspepsia. These symptoms include: belching, heartburn, chest pain, abdominal discomfort, abdominal bloating, nausea, loss of appetite, and flatulence. Dyspepsia itself is not an illness, rather it is an indicator of chronic underlying gastrointestinal issues such as peptic ulcer disease, gastro-esophageal reflux disease, H. pylori gastritis, gastroparesis, or upper gastrointestinal cancers. Dyspepsia can additionally be contributed to medications such as potassium supplements, NSAIDs, digitalis, iron, glucocorticoids, and colchicine, as well as lifestyle factors such as diet, stress, and cigarette smoking.

=== Efficacy ===
Prior studies regarding the GI cocktail for management of dyspepsia in the emergency department have varied in quality of methodology and have demonstrated mixed results. A 1990 single-blind study performed by Welling and Watson compared 30 mL of antacid with or without the addition of 15 mL of viscous lidocaine and concluded that the addition of viscous lidocaine provided a significantly greater degree of immediate pain relief than antacids alone in patients with dyspepsia. A 2004 single-blind study performed by Vike and Davis, compared treatment with antacids plus either viscous lidocaine or benzocaine solution and did not find a statistically significant difference between the two treatment arms – however the study lacked an antacid monotherapy arm. A robust double-blind clinical trial performed in 2003 by Berman et al. compared 30 mL of antacid monotherapy, antacid with the addition of 10 ml of an anticholinergic, and an antacid with anticholinergic with the addition of 10 mL of 2% viscous lidocaine. That study demonstrated no statistically significant difference in pain relief between treatment arms and concluded that all treatments were clinically effective. The ultimately recommended antacid monotherapy alone in the treatment of dyspepsia.

== Side effects ==
Some people experience side effects that are the result of the individual medications used to make the GI cocktail. They include:

Viscous lidocaine:

- Allergic reaction such as rash, itching, or hives. Swelling of the lips, tongue, mouth, face, and throat is possible in severe cases
- Numbness/tingling
- Visual changes
- Nervousness
- Confusion
- Chest pain
- Seizures
- Difficulty breathing

Antacid:

- Allergic reaction such as rash, itching, or hives. Swelling of the lips, tongue, mouth, face, and throat is possible in severe cases
- Stomach cramps
- Nausea
- Constipation
- Diarrhea
- Headache

Anticholinergic:

- Dry mouth
- Blurry vision
- Dry eyes
- Constipation
- Urinary retention
- Dizziness
- Confusion
- Heart arrhythmia

== Contents and dosing ==
The GI cocktail is a mixture of a viscous anesthetic, an antacid, and an anticholinergic. Common viscous anesthetics use are viscous lidocaine or xylocaine. Common antacids used are magnesium hydroxide, aluminium hydroxide, or simethicone. Common anticholinergics used are hyoscyamine sulfate, atropine sulfate, scopolamine hydrobromide, and phenobarbital (more commonly known as Donnatal). Typical dosing is 5ml of viscous anesthetic, 30ml of liquid antacid, and 10ml of anticholinergic.
