= Van Cleave =

American composer (1910–1970)

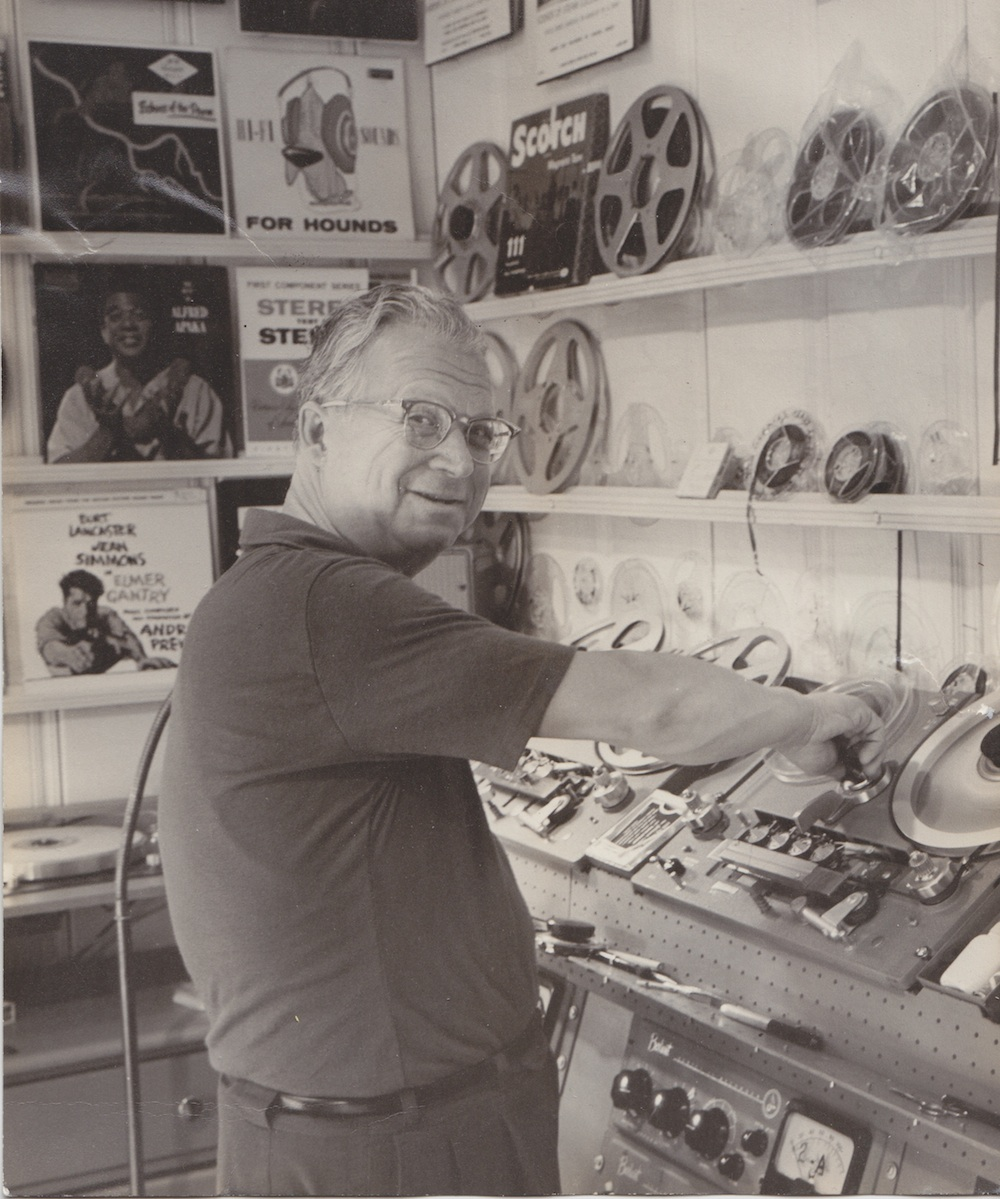
Van Cleave, c. 1960s.

Nathan Lang Van Cleave (May 8, 1910 – July 3, 1970) was a composer, arranger, and orchestrator for film, television, and radio over four decades of the twentieth century. He usually used "Van" as his first name.

== Biography ==
=== Early years ===
Born in Bayfield, Wisconsin, he played with big bands, including Doc Fenton and his Sooners and Al Katz and his Kittens. He moved to New York City where he led his own band, the Van Cleave Orchestra, in the early 1930s, then played trumpet and arranged music for Charlie Barnet's orchestra.

In 1933, he married Doris Blumenfeld, a Broadway chorus girl and the child of vaudeville actors of the German Blumenfeld circus family.

=== Musical studies and technical inventions ===
Van Cleave studied music with noted composer and music theorist Joseph Schillinger, a composer known for his system of musical composition based on mathematical principles. Van Cleave used that approach in his later work in radio, where he introduced a "six-way" formula for scoring dramatic programs while working on the Columbia Workshop show. That compositional method was subsequently used on other dramatic programs of the era.

This proved important in the stressful environment of arranging and composing for radio dramas, which were broadcast live. Van Cleave would be handed a final script at around 1:00 or 2:00 p.m. for that evening's program and expected to produce a score by the final rehearsal at 3:00 p.m. His work also required precise synchronization with the actors' dialogue and any special effects, which Van Cleave used a stopwatch accurate to one fortieth of a second to achieve.

Van Cleave also worked to ensure that his musical scores for radio dramas actually achieved what he set out to do. That fixation led him to begin recording each broadcast on a home recording set in order to hear how his scores sounded to the radio audience and how each individual musician performed. He soon discovered that these commercial sets produced poor quality recordings and designed his own model to improve their sound quality. Even that did not resolve all of their quality issues, so Van Cleave then proceeded to investigate the phonograph needles he was using. With the help of a friend who had worked as an engineer with Western Electric, they developed new needles with improved sound, which they then manufactured and sold through their Duotone Company. That company expanded the products it offered for sale as Van Cleave and his partner continued to work to improve the sound quality of their equipment.

=== Career as an arranger, composer, and orchestrator in radio ===
Van Cleave started off in radio in 1935 as a staff arranger and composer for the Columbia Broadcasting System, soon moving up to working as arranger and orchestrator for Paul Whiteman (1938–39), Andre Kostelanetz, Fred Waring, and other CBS Radio performers and programs.

He succeeded Bernard Herrmann as the musical director for The Man Behind the Gun, a wartime radio program that focused on the experiences of soldiers, sailors and marines, for which Cleave composed many of the scores. The show won a Peabody Award, in large part due to Van Cleave's expressive scores and his recreation of the actual sounds of war in the studio.

By 1944 he had his own show, Variations by Van Cleave, for the recently-formed American Broadcasting Company. That show remained on the air for a year, at which point Van Cleave moved to Los Angeles to pursue a career in film.

=== Film and television career ===
Van Cleave came to Los Angeles in 1945 to work for Paramount Pictures, where he was the orchestrator or composer on films such as Branded (1950), Fancy Pants (1950), White Christmas (1954), Funny Face (1957), The Colossus of New York (1958), and Robinson Crusoe on Mars (1964). He also composed the VistaVision Fanfare to accompany the opening of theatre curtains for Paramount's wide screen format.

In many cases Van Cleave was not given any screen credit for his work; as an example, when William Wyler was unhappy with the main title that Aaron Copland had written for The Heiress (1949) he instructed Van Cleave to write a new one. Copland was so incensed over these changes made without his knowledge or approval that he issued a press release disowning the main title theme and declined to pick up the Academy Award#Oscar statuette that he had won.. Despite this very public controversy over Van Cleave's role in rewriting the film's theme he received no screen credit for it.

Van Cleave also worked at other studios, on films such as MGM's Easter Parade (1954), Cinerama Holiday (1954) for the Cinerama Company, and In Search of the Castaways (1962) at Walt Disney Productions. In addition, he worked on many TV episodes of Gunsmoke and The Twilight Zone, where he pioneered the use of the theremin in television scores. In the Gunsmoke episode "The Quest for Asa Janin," the last episode of season 8, from June 1963, with music by Van Cleave, the five-note main theme used throughout 1964's Robinson Crusoe on Mars can be heard several times.

== Later years ==
Van Cleave continued working up until his death, despite suffering from heart problems. He died from a heart attack at age 60,
