= My Friend Flicka (TV series) =

American television series

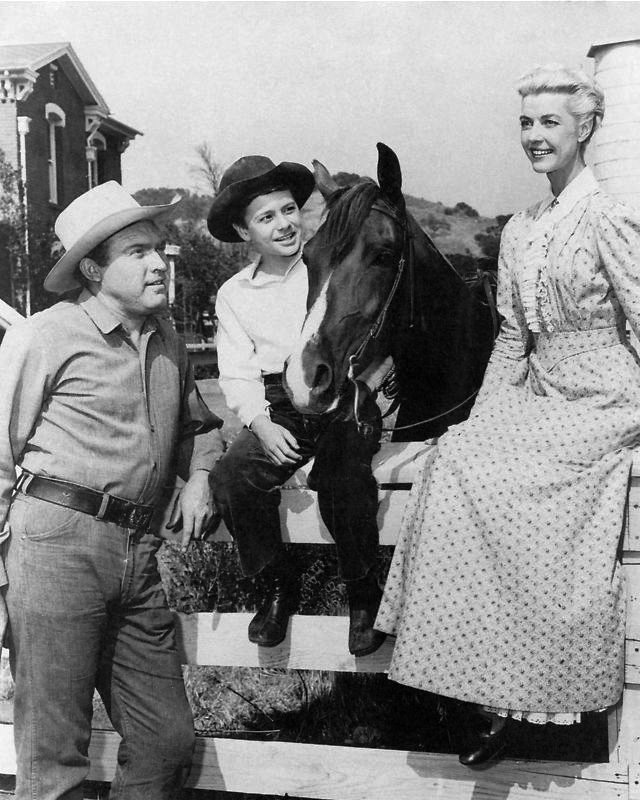
- Publicity photo
- Genre: Western/Children's
- Starring: Gene Evans; Anita Louise; Johnny Washbrook; Frank Ferguson; Pamela Beaird
- Country of origin: United States
- Original language: English
- No. of seasons: 1
- No. of episodes: 39

Production
- Production locations: Fox Movie Ranch, now part of Malibu Creek State Park
- Running time: 30 minutes
- Production company: TCF Television Productions

Original release
- Network: CBS
- Release: February 10 – November 2, 1956

My Friend Flicka is an American children's Western television series. The series is based on the novel of the same name by Mary O'Hara and the 1943 film My Friend Flicka by 20th Century Fox. It was one of the first television series produced by TCF Television Productions (later 20th Century Fox Television and 20th Television). Though filmed in color, it was originally shown on CBS in black-and-white from February 10, 1956 until May 18, 1958. Only one season was produced, but was broadcast in syndicated reruns for many years, starting in September 1957 on NBC.

== Synopsis ==
The series takes place around 1900 on the fictional Goose Bar Ranch near Coulee Springs, Wyoming. Gene Evans played horse rancher Rob McLaughlin, Anita Louise was his wife Nell McLaughlin, and Johnny Washbrook played their son Ken. Frank Ferguson was their ranch hand Gus Broeberg, and Pamela Beaird had a recurring role as Hildy Broeberg, the niece of Gus. Stories dealt with the struggles of earning a living as a rancher, and problems that neighbors and friends encountered. Each adventure centered around young Ken and his horse Flicka. Sometimes Ken's wrong choices caused problems, but the series taught the importance of learning from your mistakes. Rob would tell the youngster: "You did what you thought was right son, and that's the important thing".

== Production ==
Interior shots were filmed on the old William Fox Motion Pictures Studio, and exterior locations were at the 20th Century Fox Movie Ranch, which is now part of Malibu Creek State Park.

The series had higher-than-average production costs, with the finest camera work and other technical attributes. At a time when most viewers owned black-and-white televisions My Friend Flicka was filmed in color, though it was originally broadcast in black-and-white.

During the 1950s it was common practice to have one advertiser sponsor an entire season of a television series. CBS was asking an advertising fee of $37,500 for each episode, and at least one advertiser chose to sponsor a different series, which was $10,000 less expensive per episode. Colgate-Palmolive signed on as the series sponsor.

High production costs is believed to be the reason why the popular series did not have a second season. Instead, 20th Century-Fox chose My Friend Flicka as one of the first two series that they offered as rerun syndication packages.

== Broadcast history ==
From February 10, 1956 to February 1957 CBS broadcast My Friend Flicka on Fridays from 7:30 to 8:00 p.m., and in March it was shown on Saturdays from 7:00 to 7:30 p.m. From April to May it was on Sundays from 6:00 to 6:30 p.m., and from June to August it was shown on Wednesdays from 7:30 to 8:00 p.m. The series moved to NBC, where it aired in color for the first time. From September to December it was broadcast on Sundays from 6:30 to 7:00 p.m., and from January to May 1958 it was shown on Sundays from 7:00 to 7:30 p.m.

During the 1959 - 1960 television season ABC broadcast the series weekdays during the late afternoon. My Friend Flicka then moved to Saturday afternoons. During the 1961 - 1962 season it was broadcast on CBS, it was on ABC from September 1962 to December 1963, and it returned to CBS from September 1964 to September 1966.

== Episodes ==
No.	Title	Directed by	Written by	Original release date
1	"One Man's Horse"	Nathan Juran	Peter Packer, DeVallon Scott	February 10, 1956
Flicka is stolen by an outlaw, who threatens to kill the horse if Ken tells anyone. Hugh Beaumont is a guest star.
2	"Blind Faith"	Robert Gordon	Nat Tanchuck, Art Browne, Jr., Curtis Kenyon	February 17, 1956
Flicka is blinded in an accident, but Ken believes she will regain her sight.
3	"A Case of Honor"	Nathan Juran	Jerry Sackheim	February 24, 1956
Ranchers & sheepherders fight over grazing land & Rob is accused of poisoning a water hole.
4	"A Good Deed"	Frederick Stephani	Mary Lacey, Kay Lenard	March 2, 1956
Ken and Flicka help a disabled child conquer his fear of horses.
5	"Cavalry Horse"	Frederick Stephani	DeVallon Scott, Jerry Sackheim	March 9, 1956
The McLaughlins try to save a soldier's old horse from being put down.
6	"The Accident"	Frederick Stephani	Kay Lenard	March 16, 1956
Ken is stalked by a killer dog after he is thrown from Flicka and can't walk.
7	"The Stranger"	Robert Gordon	Peter Paker, DeVallon Scott	March 23, 1956
Ken is kidnapped by an escaped convict.
8	"The Wild Horse"	Robert Gordon	George Slavin, George W. George	March 30, 1956
Soon after Ken refuses to sell Flicka the horse is missing from her stall.
9	"The Rogue Stallion"	Nathan Juran	Kay Lenard	April 6, 1956
Both Rob and a rival rancher want to capture a beautiful wild horse. Claude Akins is a guest star.
10	"The Little Secret"	Nathan Juran	Jerry Sackheim	April 13, 1956
A Native American mother wants Ken to take her sick baby to a doctor.
11	"Act of Loyalty"	Nathan Juran	Malvin Wald, Jack Jacobs	April 20, 1956
Flicka helps a fugitive escape from jail, and townspeople suspect Ken was involved with the escape.
12	"The Silver Saddle"	John English	Malvin Wald, Jack Jacobs, Curtis Kenyon	April 27, 1956
Ken is accused of letting a horse escape so Flicka can win a horse show.
13	"The Phantom Herd"	James B. Clark	Peter Packer	May 4, 1956
Rob decides to sell the ranch after his entire herd of horses run off.
14	"The Little Visitor"	Frederick Stephani	Nat Tanchuck, Art Browne, Jr.	May 11, 1956
Ken and a headstrong visiting boy are trapped in a mine.
15	"The Golden Promise"	John English	Kay Lenard	May 18, 1956
Ken and Gus neglect ranch work to hunt for gold. Rob tries to do all the chores by himself and breaks his leg.
16	"Black Dust"	John English	Kay Lenard	May 25, 1956
The construction crew working to reopen a mine are contaminating the water.
17	"The Night Rider"	Ted Thomas, Jan Leman	Robert Gordon	June 1, 1956
An old murder mystery is solved after Ken and Flicka trail a ghostly rider.
18	"The Settler"	Robert Gordon	David Lang	June 8, 1956
Ken and Flicka try to find a runaway horse.
19	"Wind From Heaven"	Robert Gordon	George Asness	June 15, 1956
While ranchers are feuding with homesteaders Ken befriends a homesteader's child.
20	"The Whip"	James Clark	Rik Vollaerts	June 22, 1956
When an experienced horse trainer sees Ken calm a stallion with kindness he learns he knows less than he thought he did.
21	"The Runaways"	John English	Kay Lenard	June 29, 1956
Flicka runs away from the ranch to join a wild horse that Rob is trying to tame.
22	"The Cameraman"	John English	Jan Leman, Ted Thomas, Lowell Hawley	July 6, 1956
Rob saves a photographer from stampeding horses, then suspects him of being a thief. John Carradine is a guest star.
23	"Old Danny"	John English	Kay Lenard	July 13, 1956
Ken and Flicka help a little girl whose dog is endangered by coyotes.
24	"Rough and Ready"	John English	Curtis Enyon	July 20, 1956
Theodore Roosevelt tries to settle a war between ranch owners and a cattle baron.
25	"The Royal Carriage"	John English	Curtis Kenyon	July 27, 1956
Ken helps his mother prepare a royal reception for a visiting countess.
26	"Mister Goblin"	John English	Kay Lenard	August 3, 1956
Ken brings home a stray white colt. Jane Darwell is a guest star.
27	"Rebels in Hiding"	Donald McDougal	Lowell S. Hawley	August 10, 1956
A former Native American chief runs away from the reservation with his grandson, to keep the boy out a white school.
28	"Lock, Stock and Barrel"	John English	Warren Wilson	August 17, 1956
Ken hides Flicka in an abandoned barn so he won't have to turn her out on the range. He doesn't know the barn has just been sold. Claude Akins guest stars.
29	"The Unmasking"	Albert S. Rogell	David Lane	August 24, 1956
Ken and a husband-hunting woman befriend a thief. Sheb Wooley guest stars.
30	"Refuge for the Night"	Robert Gordon	Jerry Sackheim	August 31, 1956
Ken and his mother, Nell, are alone at the ranch when an escaped criminal takes it over as a hide-out.
31	"Against All Odds"	John English	J. Benton Cheney, Lowell S. Hawley	September 7, 1956
A puppy, found in Ken's rabbit snare, disrupts the McLaughlin's household.
32	"The Old Champ"	John English	Lowell S. Hawley, Jerry Sackheim	September 14, 1956
Rob competes as a wrestler at a medicine show, and Ken bets Flicka on the outcome.
33	"The Medicine Man"	John English	George Asness, Curtis Kenyon	September 21, 1956
Neighbors try to prevent a Native American doctor from treating Nell.
34	"When Bugles Blow"	John English	Warren Wilson	September 28, 1956
Gus tries to talk Rob out of his desire to re-enlist in the cavalry.
35	"The Recluse"	John English	Jerry Sackheim	October 5, 1956
Ken mets an eccentric elderly woman, and thinks she may be a witch.
36	"The Foundlings"	John English	Muriel Roy Bolton	October 12, 1956
Ken runs away from home and meets up with two unhappy orphans who long for a family of their own.
37	"Growing Pains"	Albert S. Rogell	Wanda Tuchock	October 19, 1956
Ken welcomes a little girl and a prize bull to the ranch and learns that both can be unpredictable.
38	"The Lost River"	Robert Gordon	Jerry Sackheim	October 26, 1956
Rob buys a stallion with a Chinese brand which means "Evil comes to him who owns me". Mishaps take place while digging for water.
39	"Big Red"	John English	Curtis Kenyon	November 2, 1956
Rob and Ken trail an escaped show horse and are menaced by a gun-wielding cowhand. Denver Pyle is a guest star.

== Additional boy and his horse TV westerns ==
- The Adventures of Champion
- Fury
