= The Colossus of New York =

1958 film by Eugène Goldbeck

- Directed by: Eugène Lourié
- Screenplay by: Thelma Schnee
- Story by: Willis Goldbeck
- Produced by: William Alland
- Starring: Ross Martin; Otto Kruger; John Baragrey; Mala Powers; Charles Herbert
- Cinematography: John F. Warren
- Edited by: Floyd Knudtson
- Music by: Van Cleave
- Color process: Black and white
- Production company: William Alland Productions
- Distributed by: Paramount Pictures
- Release date: June 26, 1958
- Running time: 70 minutes
- Country: United States
- Language: English

The Colossus of New York is a 1958 American science fiction film from Paramount Pictures, produced by William Alland, directed by Eugène Lourié, that stars Ross Martin, Otto Kruger, John Baragrey, Mala Powers, Robert Hutton, and Charles Herbert. The screenplay was written by Thelma Schnee, the maiden name of Thelma Moss, who later became a famous parapsychologist. The film's storyline is credited to Willis Goldbeck while John P. Fulton handled the special photographic effects, and Wally Westmore handled the makeup. Paramount Pictures theatrically released Colossus on June 26, 1958, as a double feature with The Space Children (1958).

Following an accident, Jeremy Spensser's brain is transplanted by his scientist father into the huge body of an unattractive, frightening cyborg, to save his brilliant son's mind so that it can continue to serve mankind. Soon, his son's brain becomes transformed by the experimental procedure, losing key attributes that make him human and define his personality.

== Plot ==
Jeremy Spensser (Ross Martin), the brilliant young son of a New York family of scientists and humanitarians, is killed when hit by a truck as he chases his son's toy airplane. His death occurs on the eve of his winning the "International Peace Prize", and he leaves behind a wife (Mala Powers) and young son (Charles Herbert).

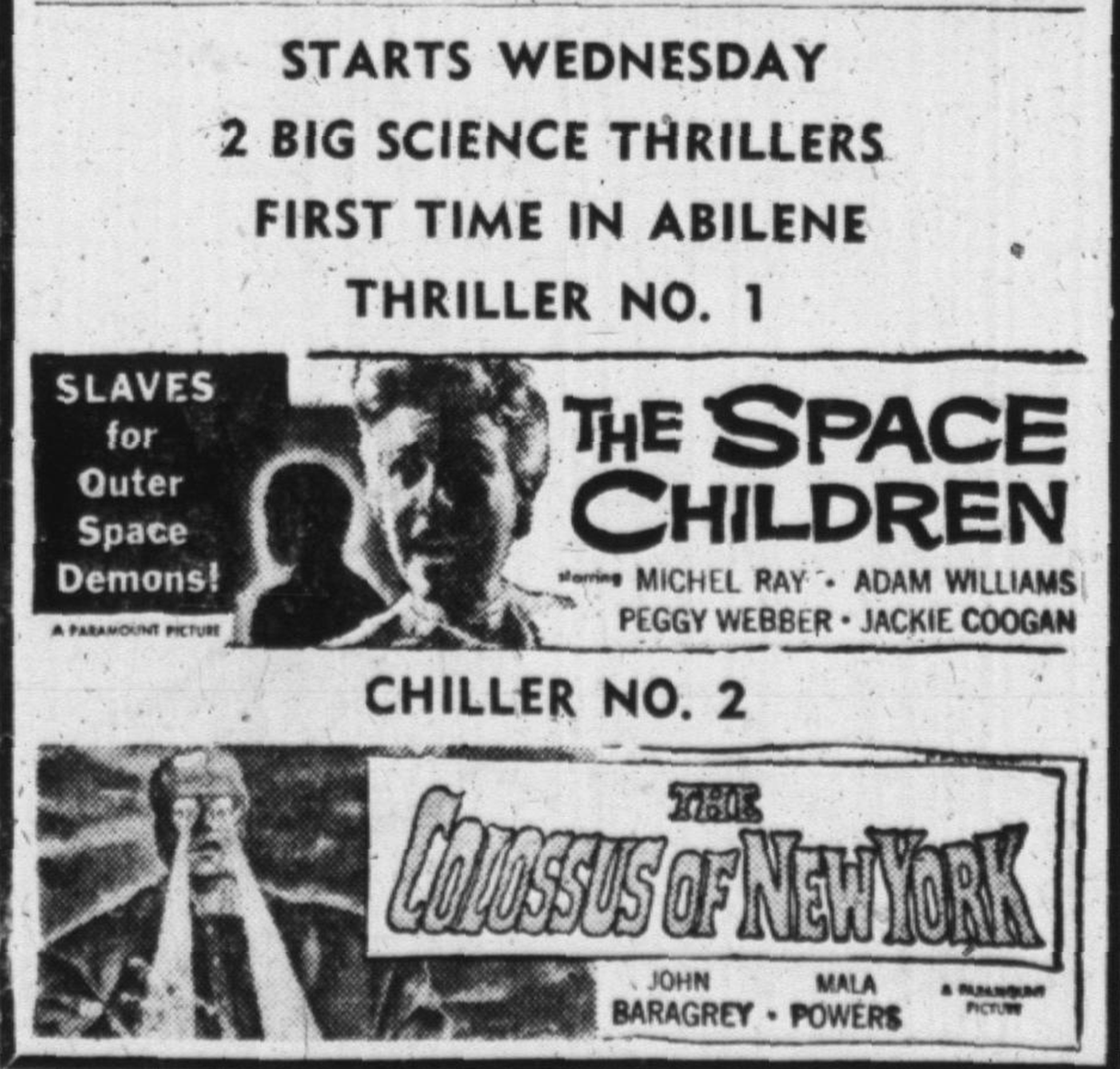
Advertisement from 1958 for The Colossus of New York and co-feature, The Space Children

Jeremy's father, noted brain surgeon William Spensser (Otto Kruger), is distressed that his son's gifts will be denied to mankind. He devises a plan to give Jeremy's mind another chance to benefit humanity by transplanting the brain (which he has revived and kept on life support) into an artificial, robotic body. William convinces Jeremy's brother, Henry, an expert in automation, to assist with the process in secret.

Because of its horrific appearance, the huge colossus (Ed Wolff) they have created is kept in seclusion for nearly a year, secretly continuing Jeremy's work on new food sources. Deprived of normal human contact and possibly of its "soul", Jeremy's mind slowly begins to lose its humanity. He kills his brother, who has fallen in love with Jeremy's wife, and then speaks to his father of the futility of providing food for "the slum people of the world", when it is "simpler and wiser to get rid of them". As Jeremy's mind loses control of his mechanical body, other unexplained powers suddenly emerge from the strictly mechanical body, including mind control of humans and a death ray emanating from both its eyes.

Finally, Jeremy's out-of-control body goes on a rampage in the United Nations building, killing several people. Only when Jeremy's young son confronts the cyborg is Jeremy able to restore his self-control long enough to tell the boy how to switch off and destroy the body of the "colossus".

== Cast ==
- John Baragrey as Dr. Henry Spensser
- Mala Powers as Anne Spensser
- Otto Kruger as Dr. William Spensser
- Robert Hutton as Dr. John Robert Carrington
- Ross Martin as Dr. Jeremy 'Jerry' Spensser
- Charles Herbert as Billy Spensser
- Ed Wolff as The Colossus
- Roy Engel
- George Douglas
- Dick Nelson

=== Home media ===
Olive Films released Colossus of New York on Blu-ray June 19, 2012.

== Soundtrack ==
The film is noted for its haunting, minimalistic piano score composed by Van Cleave.

== In other media ==
The film's theatrical release poster appears in the 38th episode, titled "Sight", of the UK natural history TV series Eyewitness, when the narrator is discussing the concept of the Evil Eye.

== See also ==
- The Master Mystery (1918)
- The Giant of Metropolis (1961)
- Gigantor (1964)
- Frankenstein Jr. (1966)
