= Back There =

- The Twilight Zone episode
- Episode no.: Season 2 Episode 13
- Directed by: David Orrick McDearmon
- Written by: Rod Serling
- Production code: 173-3648
- Original air date: January 13, 1961

Guest appearances
- Russell Johnson; Paul Hartman; John Lasell; Bartlett Robinson; Nora Marlowe; Raymond Bailey; Raymond Greenleaf

Episode chronology
← Previous "Dust"	Next → "The Whole Truth"
- The Twilight Zone (1959 TV series, season 2)

"Back There" is episode 49 of the American television anthology series The Twilight Zone. It originally aired on January 13, 1961 on CBS, and was the 13th episode of the second season. It was written by series creator Rod Serling and was directed by David Orrick McDearmon. It involves time travel, and stars Russell Johnson, who had appeared in another time-travel episode the previous season.

== Opening narration ==
Witness a theoretical argument, Washington, D.C., the present. Four intelligent men talking about an improbable thing like going back in time. A friendly debate revolving around a simple issue: could a human being change what has happened before? Interesting and theoretical, because who ever heard of a man going back in time? Before tonight, that is, because this is—The Twilight Zone.

== Plot ==
On April 14, 1961, young engineer Peter Corrigan is involved in a discussion with colleagues at the elite Potomac Club (a Gentlemen’s Club) on the question of time travel. After bumping into William, a familiar attendant, on the way out, Peter feels faint. Confused by the gas lamps and horse-drawn carriages on the street, he notices that he's wearing clothes of a much older style and walks home only to find that his home is now a boarding house. In discussion with the strangers he meets there, he discovers that he has been transported back in time to April 14, 1865, the date of the assassination of Abraham Lincoln by John Wilkes Booth.

Corrigan rushes to Ford's Theatre to warn everyone but is arrested for disturbing the peace. Only one officer believes Corrigan, but is overruled by his superior. After he has been held in the police station a short time, a man who states he is a doctor with expertise in mental illness arrives. He introduces himself as Jonathan Wellington and persuades the police to release Corrigan into his custody. Wellington subsequently drugs Corrigan, before leaving and locking the door. Wellington is later identified by the landlady as Booth, which is confirmed by a handkerchief he left behind bearing the initials JWB; meanwhile outside the news is spreading that the president has just been shot.

Corrigan pounds his fist on a window still angry that no one listened and finds he is back in 1961 at the Potomac Club. It seems the same, but there is no longer an attendant named William. Back at the table with his colleagues, he finds that the scholarly discussion has moved from time travel to money, and William is also at the table participating. William says that his money was inherited from his great-grandfather, a policeman who had made a name for himself by predicting the assassination of Lincoln, becoming Chief of Police, then a councilman, and eventually becoming a millionaire through real estate. Corrigan's disbelief is amplified further by the JWB handkerchief he had placed in his pocket. He had in fact changed the past, but not in the way he had intended.

== Closing narration ==
Mr. Peter Corrigan, lately returned from a place 'back there', a journey into time with highly questionable results, proving on one hand that the threads of history are woven tightly, and the skein of events cannot be undone, but on the other hand, there are small fragments of tapestry that can be altered. Tonight's thesis to be taken, as you will—in The Twilight Zone.

== Cast ==
- Russell Johnson as Peter Corrigan
- Paul Hartman as Police Sergeant
- John Lasell as Jonathan Wellington
- Bartlett Robinson as William
- Nora Marlowe as Chambermaid
- Raymond Bailey as Millard
- Raymond Greenleaf as Jackson

== See also ==
- Fatalism
- Predestination
- List of The Twilight Zone (1959 TV series) episodes
- Season 2
- The Twilight Zone (2002 TV series) (episode 32 "Memphis")
