= The DuPont Show with June Allyson =

American TV anthology series (1959–1961)

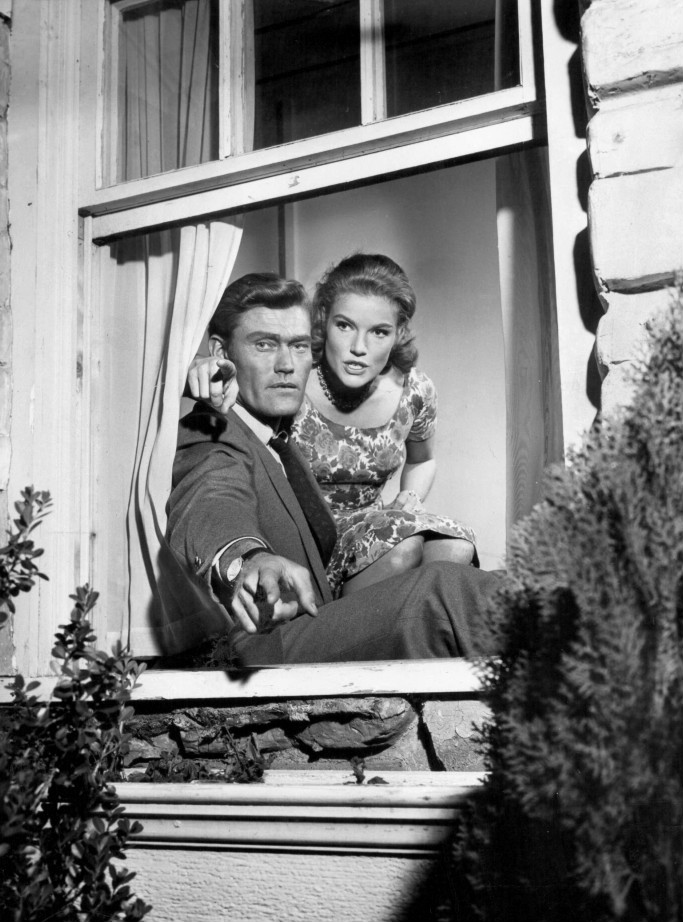
- Chuck Connors and Pippa Scott in the 1960 presentation Trial By Fear.
- Also known as: The June Allyson Show
- Genre: Anthology
- Directed by: Robert Butler; Paul Dunlap; Paul Henreid; Arthur Hiller; Lamont Johnson; Don Medford; James Neilson; Jack Smight
- Presented by: June Allyson
- Composer: Herschel Burke Gilbert
- Country of origin: United States
- Original language: English
- No. of seasons: 2
- No. of episodes: 57

Production
- Producers: Peter Kortner; Stephen Lord
- Running time: 25 mins. (approx)

Original release
- Network: CBS
- Release: September 21, 1959 – June 12, 1961

The DuPont Show with June Allyson (also known as The June Allyson Show) is an American anthology drama series which aired on CBS from September 21, 1959, to April 3, 1961, with rebroadcasts continuing until June 12, 1961.

The series was hosted by actress June Allyson and was a Four Star-Pamric Production. Allyson sometimes starred in episodes, one of which ("A Summer's Ending") was her first appearance on TV with her husband, Dick Powell.

Aaron Spelling was the producer. Paul Henreid, James Neilson, and Jack Smight were directors. Richard Levinson and William Link were writers for the program.

Allyson took offense when critics dismissed the program with comments that included comparing its episodes to contents of women's fiction magazines. "Any show that stars a woman just naturally seems to be called a soap opera, whether it is or not", she said.

== Episodes ==
=== Season 1 (1959–1960) ===
No. overall	No. in season	Title	Original release date	Guest stars
1	1	"Ruth and Naomi"	September 21, 1959	Peter Mark Richman and Ann Harding
2	2	"Dark Morning"	September 28, 1959	Bette Davis and Leif Erickson
3	3	"The Opening Door"	October 5, 1959	Virginia Christine and Irene Dunne
4	4	"A Summer's Ending"	October 12, 1959	Dick Powell
5	5	"The Tender Shoot"	October 19, 1959	Ginger Rogers
6	6	"The Pledge"	October 26, 1959	Mona Freeman and Don Keefer
7	7	"Love Is a Headache"	November 2, 1959	Pedro Gonzalez Gonzalez and Rodolfo Hoyos Jr.
8	8	"Child Lost"	November 16, 1959	Steve Brodie and Ron Howard
9	9	"Night Out"	November 23, 1959	Pat Carroll and Ann Sothern
10	10	"The Girl"	November 30, 1959	James Coburn, Ellen Corby and Jane Powell
11	11	"The Wall Between"	December 7, 1959	Kevin McCarthy
12	12	"The Crossing"	December 14, 1959	Dolores Hart and Howard Petrie
13	13	"No Place to Hide"	December 21, 1959	Robert Horton, Debra Paget and Don Rickles
14	14	"Suspected"	December 28, 1959	Marjorie Bennett, Ann Blyth, and Gerald Mohr
15	15	"Edge of Fury"	January 4, 1960	Dan O'Herlihy
16	16	"The Trench Coat"	January 11, 1960	Phyllis Coates, David Niven, Ann McCrea, and Lyle Talbot
17	17	"The Way Home"	January 18, 1960	Ronald Reagan
18	18	"Moment of Fear"	January 25, 1960	Edgar Bergen and Stephen McNally
19	19	"So Dim the Light"	February 1, 1960	Robert Culp and Ray Boyle
20	20	"Trial by Fear"	February 8, 1960	Chuck Connors
21	21	"Threat of Evil"	February 15, 1960	Pat Crowley
22	22	"Escape"	February 22, 1960	Brian Donlevy, Frank Lovejoy, Margaret O'Brien, and Sylvia Sidney
23	23	"Piano Man"	February 29, 1960	Vic Damone and Keenan Wynn
24	24	"Sister Mary Slugger"	March 14, 1960	Rich Correll
25	25	"The Blue Goose"	March 21, 1960	Joseph Cotten and Susan Oliver
26	26	"Once Upon a Knight"	March 28, 1960	Jean Hagen and James Mason
27	27	"Slip of the Tongue"	April 11, 1960	Virginia Grey and William Schallert
28	28	"Surprise Party"	April 18, 1960	Mark Goddard and Myrna Loy
29	29	"The Doctor and the Redhead"	April 25, 1960	Felicia Farr, Regis Toomey, and Mary Treen
30	30	"Intermission"	May 2, 1960	Russell Johnson

=== Season 2 (1960–1961) ===
No. overall	No. in season	Title	Original release date	Guest stars
31	1	"The Lie"	September 29, 1960	Mark Damon
32	2	"The Dance Man"	October 6, 1960	Anne Baxter and Dean Stockwell
33	3	"Dark Fear"	October 13, 1960	Joseph Cotten and Juanita Moore
34	4	"The Test"	October 20, 1960	Eduard Franz and Robert Knapp
35	5	"Play Acting"	October 27, 1960	Steve Allen and Rhys Williams
36	6	"The Women Who"	November 3, 1960	Van Johnson
27	7	"I Hit and Ran"	November 10, 1960	Stephen Talbot
38	8	"Love on Credit"	November 17, 1960	James Best and Carolyn Jones
39	9	"The Visitor"	November 24, 1960	Harry Townes
40	10	"A Thief or Two"	December 1, 1960	Lew Ayres and David White
41	11	"Emergency"	December 8, 1960	Robert Vaughn
42	12	"The Desperate Challenge"	December 15, 1960	Russell Johnson
43	13	"A Silent Panic"	December 22, 1960	Harpo Marx, Ernest Truex
44	14	"End of a Mission"	January 2, 1961	Steve Forrest
45	15	"The Defense Is Restless"	January 9, 1961	John Lasell
46	16	"The Guilty Heart"	January 16, 1961	James Franciscus and Susan Kohner
47	17	"An Affair in Athens"	January 23, 1961	Michael Davis
48	18	"School of the Soldier"	January 30, 1961	Lee J. Cobb, Robert Easton, and Dick York
49	19	"Without Fear"	February 6, 1961	Edward Binns
50	20	"A Great Day for a Scoundrel"	February 13, 1961	John Abbot and Hans Conried
51	21	"The Old-Fashioned Way"	February 20, 1961	Charles Lane, Dick Shawn, Rebecca Welles
52	22	"The Moth"	February 27, 1961	Joe Maross
53	23	"The Haven"	March 6, 1961	Ralph Bellamy and Patricia Breslin
54	24	"The Man Who Wanted Everything Perfect"	March 13, 1961	Russell Nype
55	25	"The Country Mouse" "The Secret Life of James Thurber"	March 20, 1961	Orson Bean and Adolphe Menjou
56	26	"Our Man in Rome"	March 27, 1961	Rossano Brazzi and Eugenie Leontovich
57	27	"Death of the Temple Bay"	April 3, 1961	Lloyd Bridges
