= Kay Cousins Johnson =

American actress and screenwriter

- Born: Kay Levy; May 28, 1923; Los Angeles, California, U.S.
- Died: January 20, 1980 (aged 56); Century City, California, U.S.
- Occupation(s): Actress, screenwriter
- Spouse: Russell Johnson (m. 1949)
- Children: 2

Kay Cousins Johnson (May 28, 1923 - January 20, 1980) was an American actress and screenwriter born in Los Angeles, California. Born Kay Levy, she is known for her appearances in television series such as The Twilight Zone, Wagon Train, and I Led 3 Lives, in addition to writing the 1978 horror film Jennifer.

== Acting work ==
- Climax! (1956) (TV)
- Private Secretary (1956) (TV) as Cecile
- I Led 3 Lives (1956) (TV) as Comrade Anna
- Studio 57 (1958) (TV)
- Wagon Train (1958) (TV) as Mrs. Miller
- M Squad (1958) (TV) as Mrs. Walsh
- The Rifleman (1959) (TV) as Flo
- The Twilight Zone (1960) (TV) (Season 2 Episode 11: "The Night of the Meek") as Irate Mother
- Ben Casey (1964) (TV) as Gloria
- The Restless Ones (1965) as Diner Waitress
- The Wild Wild West (1967) (TV) as Matron

== Writing work ==
- ABC Afterschool Specials (1976 episode: "Mighty Moose and the Quarterback Kid")
- Jennifer (1978)

== Personal life ==
Cousins studied at the Actors' Lab in Hollywood, where she met and married Russell Johnson, the actor who played the Professor on Gilligan's Island. The couple had two children together, a daughter Kim and a son David.
