= Than Wyenn =

American actor

- Than Wyenn in Perry Mason, 1958
- Born: May 2, 1919; New York City, New York
- Died: January 30, 2015 (aged 95); Woodland Hills, California
- Occupation: Actor
- Spouse: Gertrude "Guy" Goldman
- Children: 2 sons

Than Wyenn (May 2, 1919 – January 30, 2015) was an American character actor. His acting career spanned more than forty years with more than 150 credits in film and television. He may be best known for his role in the 1960 Twilight Zone episode "Execution", as well as roles in Imitation of Life in 1959 and Splash in 1984.

== Early life ==
Wyenn was from New York City. He studied acting as teenager under Michael Chekhov and Lee Strasberg, among others. He toured nationally with a Shakespearean troupe of actors. Wyenn worked on a farm in Vermont during World War II as part of the U.S. war effort.

Than Wyenn and his wife, Gertrude "Guy" Wyenn (November 19, 1921 - April 5, 2018), moved to Los Angeles following the end of World War II. He was cast in a starring role in the world premiere of Baruch Lumet's stage production Once Upon a Tailor, which debuted at The Circle Theater. His role in Once Upon a Tailor earned him a talent agent, which launched his television and film career.

== Film ==
While much of career focused on television, Wyenn appeared in several notable film roles. Wyenn portrayed Romano, an Italian film representative who attempts to recruit Lana Turner's character, Lora Meredith, in Imitation of Life in 1959. He was also cast as Mr. Ambrose in the 1984 film Splash, opposite Tom Hanks and Daryl Hannah. Other film roles included Beginning of the End in 1957, Pete Kelly's Blues in 1959, The Boy and the Pirates in 1960, and Being There in 1979.

== Television ==
In 1960, Wyenn appeared as Paul Johnson, a villain, in "Execution" during The Twilight Zone's first season. In the episode, Wyenn's character transported to the past straight into a hangman's gallows in the American frontier during the 1800s. "Execution" also starred Russell Johnson and Albert Salmi. He also guest starred on Combat!, in 1965 as Captain Beggs, along with guest star Frank Gorshin in the third-season episode "The Hell Machine". He appeared in Honey West episode one, "The Swingin' Mrs. Jones" (1965) as the driver/waiter. Wyenn's numerous other television credits, spanning the 1950s, 1960s, and 1970s, included Leave it to Beaver, Gunsmoke, Dragnet, Barnaby Jones, Mission: Impossible, The Man from U.N.C.L.E., Perry Mason, Quincy, M.E., The Six Million Dollar Man, T. J. Hooker, Hart to Hart, The Untouchables, Voyage to the Bottom of the Sea, The Virginian (TV series), Hawaii Five-O (TV series), Wanted: Dead or Alive S2 E15 as Gib Rafford in "Chain Gang" (1959), Burke's Law and Zorro.

== Other activities ==
Wyenn became a voting member of the Academy of Motion Picture Arts and Sciences in 1966. He worked as a drama consultant for the Los Angeles Bureau of Jewish Education for 37 years.

Wyenn and his wife were highly-active in Jewish causes. He was a co-founder of the Yiddish Kinder Theater in Los Angeles. He began documenting Jewish life throughout the world during the 1980s through traveling and painting.

== Death ==
Wyenn died at the Motion Picture & Television Country House and Hospital in Woodland Hills, California, on January 30, 2015, at the age of 95. He was survived by his wife of 71 years, Guy Wyenn, and their sons, Joel and Neil, and five grandchildren.

== Filmography ==
Year	Title	Role	Notes
1949	The Undercover Man	Cabbie	Uncredited
1953	A Slight Case of Larceny	Clerk	Uncredited
1954	Tennessee Champ	Usher	Uncredited
1954	The Human Jungle	Forger	Uncredited
1954	The Adventures of Hajji Baba	Auctioneer	Uncredited
1954	Black Tuesday	Bank Teller	Uncredited
1955	Pete Kelly's Blues	Rudy Shulak	
1955	The Naked Street	Rosalie's Doctor	Uncredited
1955	Good Morning, Miss Dove	Mr. Harry Levine	Uncredited
1956	The Ten Commandments	Slave	Uncredited
1957	Hot Rod Rumble	Arnie's Boss	
1957	Beginning of the End	Frank Johnson	
1957	Gunsmoke	Lonnie Pike	Season 2 Episode 39: “Jealousy"
1957	Zorro	Licenciado Piña	Last surviving cast member
1957	The Invisible Boy	Prof. Zeller	
1958	The Brothers Karamazov	Waiter	Uncredited
1958	The True Story of Lynn Stuart	Nat	Uncredited
1958	I Want to Live!	San Francisico Hood	Uncredited
1959	Imitation of Life	Romano	
1959	Wanted Dead or Alive (TV series)	Gib Rafford	Season 2 Episode 15 (Chain gang)
1960	The Boy and the Pirates	Hunter	
1960	Wanted Dead or Alive (TV series)	Elkins	Season 2 Episode 32 (Pay off at Pinto)
1962	Leave It To Beaver	The Waiter	Season 6 Episode 1 (Wally’s Dinner Date)
1963	The Alfred Hitchcock Hour	Dr. Don Burns	Season 1 Episode 19: "To Catch a Butterfly"
1964	The Alfred Hitchcock Hour	General Delivery	Season 2 Episode 23: "A Matter of Murder"
1964	The Alfred Hitchcock Hour	Ramna	Season 3 Episode 9: "Triumph"
1965	The Money Trap	Phil Kenny	Uncredited
1966	Gambit	Airport Official	Uncredited
1967	Rosie!	Psychiatrist	
1968	The Pink Jungle	Customs Agent	
1968	The Virginian (TV series)	Blacksmith	Season 7 Episode 08 (Ride to Misadventure)
1969	Hawaii Five-0 (TV series)	Andre	Season 1 Episode 24 (Six Kilos)
1977	Black Sunday	Israeli Ambassador	
1977	The Other Side of Midnight	Greek Priest	
1979	Being There	Ambassador Gaufridi	
1980	Enola Gay: The Men, the Mission, the Atomic Bomb	General Curtis LeMay	
1984	Splash	Mr. Ambrose	
