= Hot Rod Rumble =

1957 US low-budget film by Leslie H. Martinson

- Directed by: Leslie H. Martinson
- Starring: Leigh Snowden
- Music by: Alexander Courage
- Distributed by: Allied Artists Pictures
- Release date: 5 May 1957
- Running time: 79 min.
- Country: United States
- Language: English

Hot Rod Rumble is a US, low budget, black-and-white 1957 teen-oriented drag racing crime drama produced by Norman T. Herman and directed by Leslie H. Martinson. It stars Leigh Snowden and Richard Hartunian. The film tells the story of a clash within the Road Devils hot rod club when some of its members jump to a wrong conclusion following the accidental death of one of them in a car crash.

Hot Rot Rumble was Hartunian's only film. The film spun off a novel and its soundtrack was released on an LP by Alexander Courage and the Hot Rod Rumble Orchestra.

== Plot ==
The members of the Road Devils hot rod club are having a party at their usual hangout, "The Shack." Everyone is attired neatly - the men in button-down shirts and sports coats, the women in dresses and sweaters - except for Arny Crawford (Hartunian), the most disliked Road Devil, who is wearing a black leather biker jacket with the club's logo on the back. When Arny spots his erstwhile girlfriend Terri Warren (Snowden) dancing with Hank Adams (Larry Dolgin), he flies into a rage and attempts to drag Terri out of The Shack and nearly gets into a brawl with Hank and the other Road Devils. Benny (Joey Forman), president of the club, stops the confrontation and Arny leaves. Terri gets a ride home with Hank.

On the way to Terri's house, Hank spots a car following them. He believes it's Arny and speeds up to get away. But Hank's car is sideswiped by the other car as it overtakes him. Hank loses control and crashes. He's killed and Terri is injured. Someone unidentified stops and takes an unconscious Terri to the hospital. But the Road Devils, and virtually everyone else in town, are certain that Arny is responsible for Hank's death. Several Road Devils, who want Arny out of the club, go to the garage where he works and beat him senseless, despite his insistence that he had nothing to do with the crash.

A $1500 winner-take-all race is announced. Arny qualifies for the race, but immediately after he does, his car blows its engine, the result of sabotage by the other Road Devils. Arny works feverishly rebuilding the engine and arrives at the start of the race at the last minute.

Just before the race begins, Terri and Ray Johnson (Wright King) arrive. As she gets out of Ray's car, Terri finds the earring that she lost during Hank's fatal crash under the seat and realizes that the person who stopped and took her to the hospital was Ray - and therefore it was Ray, not Arny, who caused the crash. Terri confronts Ray and he confesses to his role in the accident.

The race itself is a "grueling 50-mile cross country" event that starts at the local drag strip, winds its way through the mountains on two-lane roads and ends at the same drag strip. Throughout the race, Arny and Jim Lawrence (Brett Halsey) battle for the lead, with Jim repeatedly trying to force Arny off the road. However, Arny is a better driver than Jim and wins the race. When he's awarded the $1500 certified cheque and a trophy, he mumbles "thanks," stuffs the cheque into the back pocket of his jeans and casually tosses the trophy onto the seat of his car.

Terri and the Road Devils approach Arny. They force Ray to tell him what really happened. As Arny heads back to his car to leave, Terri follows, repeatedly apologizing for not believing him the many times that he said he didn't cause the crash that killed Hank. Terri and Arny drive away together.

== Cast ==
Credited

- Leigh Snowden as Terri Warren
- Richard Hartunian as Arny Crawford
- Wright King as Ray Johnson
- Joey Forman as Benny
- Brett Halsey as Jim Lawrence
- Joseph Mell as Pops

Uncredited

- Larry Dolgin as Hank Adams
- John Brinkley as Bill
- Charles Webster as Race Official
- Dorothy Adams as Arny's Mother
- Than Wyenn as Arny's Boss

== Production ==
Hot Rod Rumble was produced at Hollywood Studios between 10 January and 25 January 1957. The film premiered in Los Angeles on 8 May 1957 and went into general release four days later, on 12 May 1957.

Hot Rod Rumble is the only film in which Hartunian appeared.

== Distribution ==
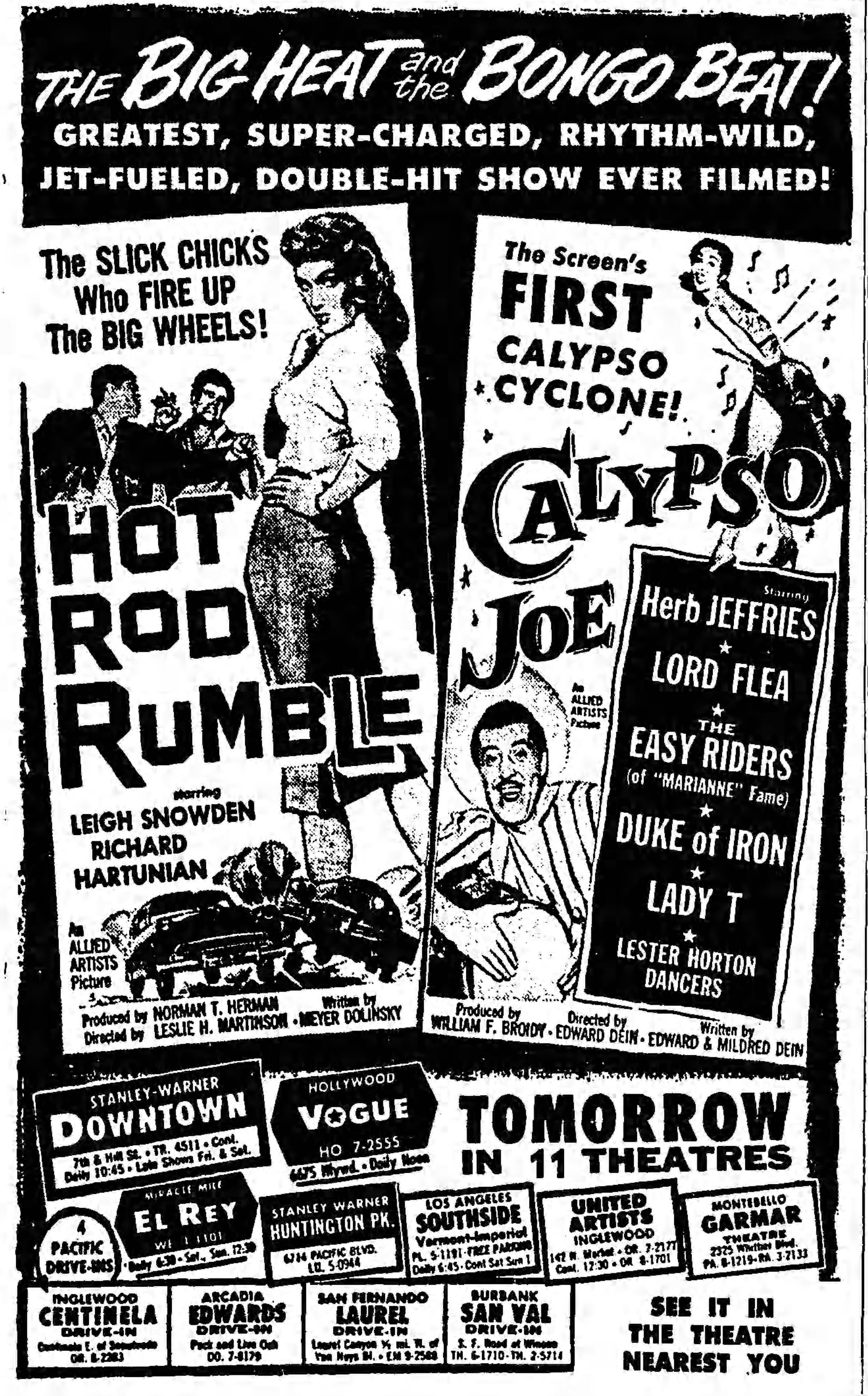
Advertisement from 1957 for Hot Rod Rumble and co-feature, Calypso Joe

Distribution of Hot Rod Rumble in the US was by Allied Artists. The film was shown on a double-bill with the musical Calypso Joe (1957). Associated British-Pathé took care of distribution in the UK, where the film was granted a U-certification, after unspecified cuts were made, by the British Board of Film Censors (BBFC) on 3 June 1957. The U-cert allowed it to be exhibited to audiences of all ages.

Text on the US poster for the film reads "DRAG STRIP SHOCKS! PISTON-HARD DRAMA! ROCK 'N ROLL LOVE!" and "Scorching story of the Slick Chicks who Fire Up the Big Wheels!"

== Reception ==
Contemporary reviews of Hot Rod Rumble were generally favourable.

BoxOffice rated the film as "good" on its five-point "very good" to "very poor" scale. The magazine also reported ratings of "good" from Harrison's Reports, Variety and The Hollywood Reporter. The New York Daily News called it "fair" while Parents' Magazine rated it as "poor."

The movie review in BoxOffice focuses on its stars. The anonymous reviewer writes that "Leigh Snowden is already established with teenagers and her name on the marquee should have box office value." The review praises Hartunian's performance, saying that he "provides the real acting punch" in the film and is an actor "who is certain to remind many a teenager of James Dean in appearance, mannerisms and speech." In overall terms, BoxOffice calls Hot Rod Rumble a "film of real story power for the teenage and slightly older segment of motion picture patronage."

Both The Grindhouse Data Base and Rate Your Music use the word "carsploitation" as the film's genre. But academic film historian Randall Clark classifies it as an exploitation film and notes that hot rods were "the favourite trend of exploitation filmmakers" in the late 1950s.

== Novelization ==
Avon Press in 1957 published a 25¢ paperback novelization of the film under the title "Hot Rod Gang Rumble." It was written by Meyer Dolinsky, who had also written the film. The novel's text is illustrated with photos from the movie. The blurb on the book's cover is "Teen-age Tigress - She Drove Boys to Juvenile Delinquency!"

== Soundtrack ==
While "few if any of these [hot rod] films warrented a soundtrack release," Hot Rod Rumble is an exception as its soundtrack was issued by Liberty Records in July 1957. The LP contains 14 songs, including the main title and end title music, composed by Sandy Courage and performed by "The Hot Rod Rumble Orchestra," a group of 34 jazz musicians, including Maynard Ferguson. The music plays as background for 37 minutes of the film's 79-minute running time.
