= Harrigan and Son =

1960 American TV sitcom

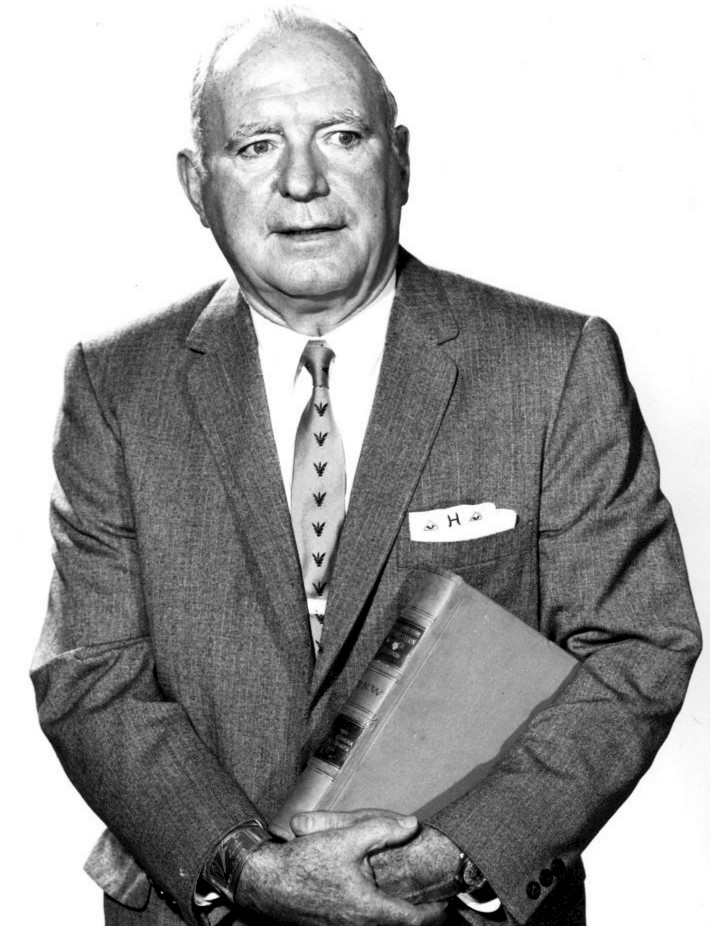
- Pat O'Brien as James Harrigan Sr.
- Created by: Cy Howard
- Starring: Pat O'Brien; Roger Perry; Helen Kleeb; Georgine Darcy
- Composer: Bill Loose
- Country of origin: United States
- Original language: English
- No. of seasons: 1
- No. of episodes: 34

Production
- Running time: 30 minutes
- Production company: Desilu Productions

Original release
- Network: ABC
- Release: October 14, 1960 – September 29, 1961

Roger Perry as James Harrigan Jr. and Georgine Darcy as Harrigan Sr.'s secretary, Gypsy.

Harrigan and Son is an American sitcom about a father-and-son team of lawyers played by Pat O'Brien as James Harrigan Sr. and Roger Perry as James Jr. airing on ABC from October 14, 1960, until September 29, 1961. In supporting roles, as secretaries, are Georgine Darcy as Gypsy and Helen Kleeb as Miss Claridge.

A running gag in the show consisted of Harrigan Sr. commenting on some situation in Latin, Harrigan Jr. replying, "Which means?" and Harrigan Sr. translating his comment, usually humorous, into English. The same gag had been used often in the television show Colonel Humphrey Flack some years earlier.

The closing of the show featured O'Brien and Perry, in silhouette behind the credits, singing the old George M. Cohan song, "Harrigan".

== Episodes ==
No.	Title	Directed by	Written by	Original release date
1	"Junior Joins the Law Firm"	Unknown	Unknown	October 14, 1960
2	"Young Man's World"	Unknown	Unknown	October 21, 1960
3	"Harrigan vs. Harrigan"	Unknown	Unknown	October 28, 1960
4	"Mother Was a Nightclub Singer"	Unknown	Unknown	November 4, 1960
5	"Pay the Two Dollars"	Unknown	Unknown	November 11, 1960
6	"A Matter of Dignity"	Unknown	Unknown	November 18, 1960
7	"Miss Claridge Finds Romance"	Unknown	Unknown	December 2, 1960
8	"There's No Fool Like an Old Fool"	Unknown	Unknown	December 9, 1960
9	"Pipes Are Pipes"	Unknown	Unknown	December 16, 1960
10	"Junior Becomes Senior"	Unknown	Unknown	December 23, 1960
11	"Non Compos Mentis"	Unknown	Unknown	December 30, 1960
12	"Junior Goes Society"	Unknown	Unknown	January 6, 1961
13	"Junior's Other Job"	Unknown	Unknown	January 13, 1961
14	"Poor Little Rich Guy"	Unknown	Unknown	January 20, 1961
15	"My Fair Lawyer"	Unknown	Unknown	January 27, 1961
16	"Shall We Dance?"	Unknown	Unknown	February 3, 1961
17	"The Magnificent Borough"	Unknown	Unknown	February 10, 1961
18	"You Can Fight City Hall"	Unknown	Unknown	February 17, 1961
19	"The Comeback"	Unknown	Unknown	February 24, 1961
20	"The Comics"	Unknown	Unknown	March 3, 1961
21	"100 Proof"	Unknown	Unknown	March 10, 1961
22	"They Were All in Step But Jim"	Unknown	Unknown	March 17, 1961
23	"The Manly Art"	Unknown	Unknown	March 24, 1961
24	"A Ticket to Albany"	Unknown	Unknown	March 31, 1961
25	"The Man Who Wouldn't Stay Dead"	Unknown	Unknown	April 7, 1961
26	"Harrigan vs. Harvard"	Unknown	Unknown	April 14, 1961
27	"Senior Goes to Hollywood"	Unknown	Unknown	April 21, 1961
28	"The Case of the Missing Case"	Unknown	Unknown	April 28, 1961
29	"Hans Is Hot"	Unknown	Unknown	May 5, 1961
30	"Goodbye, Hello"	Sherman Marks	Henry Garson	May 12, 1961
31	"The Legacy"	Unknown	Unknown	May 19, 1961
32	"Roommates"	Unknown	Unknown	May 26, 1961
33	"On Broadway"	Unknown	Unknown	September 22, 1961
34	"The Testimonial"	Unknown	Unknown	September 29, 1961

== Guest stars ==
- John Anderson
- John Astin
- Parley Baer
- Raymond Bailey
- Ken Berry
- Willis Bouchey, twice as Joe Carr
- Richard Bull
- Victor Buono, three times as Dr. Blaine
- King Calder
- John Carradine
- Sidney Clute
- Bert Convy
- Burt Douglas
- William Fawcett
- Eva Gabor, twice as Lillian Lovely
- Gina Gillespie
- Gale Gordon
- Gloria Grahame
- Harry Holcombe
- Clegg Hoyt
- Allyn Joslyn
- Robert Karnes
- Forrest Lewis
- Elizabeth MacRae
- Gerald Mohr
- Carl Monson
- Agnes Moorehead
- J. Pat O'Malley
- Leo Penn
- Olan Soule
- Jack Weston
