= Outside the Law (1956 film) =

1956 film by Jack Arnold

- British quad poster
- Directed by: Jack Arnold
- Screenplay by: Danny Arnold
- Based on: Peter R. Brooke
- Produced by: Albert J. Cohen
- Starring: Ray Danton; Leigh Snowden; Grant Williams
- Cinematography: Irving Glassberg
- Edited by: Irving Birnbaum
- Color process: Black and white
- Production company: Universal Pictures
- Distributed by: Universal Pictures
- Release date: June 1956
- Running time: 81 minutes
- Country: United States
- Language: English

Outside the Law is a 1956 American film noir crime film directed by Jack Arnold and starring Ray Danton, Leigh Snowden and Grant Williams.

== Plot ==
A government agent's son, who is a veteran of World War II and a former juvenile delinquent, is offered the opportunity to clear his prison record by helping to break up an international counterfeiting ring. A friend of his with whom he shared both a jail cell and time in the army was involved in the ring and had been murdered in Germany at the end of the war.

== Cast ==
- Ray Danton as John Conrad, alias Johnny Salvo
- Leigh Snowden as Maria Craven
- Grant Williams as Don Kastner
- Onslow Stevens as Chief Agent Alec Conrad
- Raymond Bailey as Philip Bormann
- Judson Pratt as Agent Saxon
- Jack Kruschen as Agent Pill Schwartz
- Floyd Simmons as Agent Harris
- Mel Welles as Milo
- Alexander Campbell as Warden Lewis
- Karen Verne as Mrs. Pulenski
- Maurice Doner as Mr. Pulenski
- Jess Kirkpatrick as Bill MacReady
- Arthur Hanson as Agent Parker
- Richard H. Cutting as Agent Pomeroy
- George E. Mather as Bus Station Attendant
- Amapola Del Vando as Mama Gomez

== See also ==
- List of American films of 1956
