= Lee Sholem =

American film director

Lee Tabor Sholem (May 25, 1913 in Paris, Illinois – August 19, 2000 in Los Angeles, California) was an American television and film director.

Nicknamed ""Roll 'Em" Sholem", Sholem is recognized in the industry for his speed and efficiency. He directed over 1,300 productions, including feature films and TV episodes.

Sholem's first film was Tarzan's Magic Fountain in 1949 and his last film was Doomsday Machine in 1972.

== Filmography ==
| Year | Title | Role |
|---|---|---|
| 1967 | Catalina Caper | Director |
| 1972 | Doomsday Machine | Director |
| 1956 | Emergency Hospital | Director |
| 1955 | Ma and Pa Kettle at Waikiki | Director |
| 1957 | Pharaoh's Curse | Director |
| 1953 | The Redhead from Wyoming | Director |
| 1957 | Sierra Stranger | Director |
| 1953 | The Stand at Apache River | Director |
| 1951 | Superman and the Mole Men | Director |
| 1950 | Tarzan and the Slave Girl | Director |
| 1949 | Tarzan's Magic Fountain | Director |
| 1954 | Tobor the Great | Director |
| 1954 | Jungle Man-Eaters | Director |
| 1954 | Cannibal Attack | Director |
| 1956 | Crime Against Joe | Director |
| 1957 | Hell Ship Mutiny | Director |
| 1959 | The Louisiana Hussy | Director |

== Television credits ==
- Men into Space
- 77 Sunset Strip
- Maverick
- Sugarfoot
- Cheyenne
- Captain Midnight
- The Adventures of Long John Silver
- Adventures of Superman
- WhirlyBirds
