= Seminole (film) =

1953 film

- Poster
- Directed by: Budd Boetticher
- Screenplay by: Charles K. Peck Jr.
- Story by: Charles K. Peck Jr.
- Produced by: Howard Christie
- Starring: Rock Hudson; Anthony Quinn; Barbara Hale; Richard Carlson
- Cinematography: Russell Metty
- Edited by: Virgil W. Vogel
- Color process: Technicolor
- Production company: Universal International Pictures
- Distributed by: Universal Pictures
- Release date: March 20, 1953 (Los Angeles)
- Running time: 87 minutes
- Country: United States
- Language: English
- Box office: $1.4 million (US)

Seminole is a 1953 American Western film directed by Budd Boetticher and starring Rock Hudson, Barbara Hale, Anthony Quinn and Richard Carlson. Much of the film was shot in the Everglades National Park, Florida. The film depicts the Second Seminole War (1835–1842).

== Plot ==
At Fort King, Florida, in 1835, Lieutenant Lance Caldwell is charged with the murder of a sentry. At his court martial, he recounts the story of the fragile peace between the settlers and the native Seminole and how that peace is threatened by the strict fort commander, Major Harlan Degan, who wants to wipe out the natives. Caldwell's childhood sweetheart, Revere Muldoon, meets Osceola, a Seminole chief and old friend of Lt. Caldwell's. Through respect for Caldwell, Osceola comes to the fort under a flag of truce, but is imprisoned by Maj. Degan. Osceola dies while in captivity and Caldwell is accused of his murder and jailed. Eventually, the truth comes out and the Seminole rescue Caldwell from his prison.

== Cast ==
- Rock Hudson as Lance Caldwell
- Barbara Hale as Revere
- Anthony Quinn as Osceola
- Richard Carlson as Major Degan
- Hugh O'Brian as Kajeck
- Russell Johnson as Lt. Hamilton
- Lee Marvin as Sgt. Magruder
- Ralph Moody as Kulak
- Fay Roope as Zachary Taylor
- James Best as Corp. Gerard
- John Daheim as Scott (as John Day)

== Historical accuracy ==
Osceola was arrested under the treacherous and unwholesome circumstances which the film portrays. The character of Major Harlan Degan is based on the real life General Thomas Jesup who eventually had to resign in disgrace over the incident. The name "Jesup" was abruptly changed to "Degan" at the last minute, only days before filming started, to prevent being sued by living descendants of Jesup. The ambush in which Jesup and his men attempt to kill an encampment of Seminole while they're sleeping, only to find they've bayoneted bales of straw wrapped in blankets and disguised as sleeping people, is based on a real incident; Jesup attempted to ambush a Seminole encampment in between what is today Umatilla, Florida and Lake Yale and the Seminole carried out a counter-ambush in which Jesup was wounded, most of his men were killed and he was carried to safety (after being shot with an arrow) by two of his own soldiers. The film is considered exceptionally realistic in its portrayal of the flaws in U.S. strategy during the Second Seminole War, its portrayal of Jesup, U.S. military uniforms and weaponry of the time period, and American social norms pertaining to race and gender. The film was also considerably ahead of its time in its overwhelmingly sympathetic and realistic portrayal of the Seminole people.

== See also ==
- Florida Western
