= Leigh Snowden =

American actress

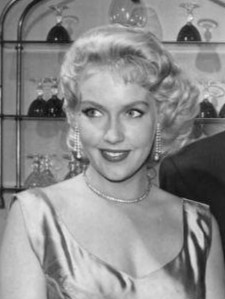
- Snowden in a promotional picture for Tightrope! (1960)
- Born: Martha Lee Estes; June 23, 1929; Memphis, Tennessee, U.S.
- Died: May 16, 1982 (aged 52); North Hollywood, California, U.S.
- Occupations: Film, television, stage actress
- Years active: 1954–1961, 1971
- Spouses: James W. Snowden, Sr. (m. 1952; div. 1955) Dick Contino (m. 1956)
- Children: 5

Leigh Snowden (June 23, 1929 – May 16, 1982) was an American model and actress who appeared in motion pictures and television.

== Early life ==
Snowden was born Martha Lee Estes in Memphis, Tennessee, U.S. When her father died when she was three, Estes and her mother moved to Covington, Tennessee. When she was 16, Estes married her classmate, James Snowden, and moved with him to San Francisco, California, when he joined the military. After the birth of two children, a girl and boy, Leigh and James Snowden got an uncontested divorce with Leigh gaining custody of the children.

== Early career ==
After her divorce, Snowden moved to Los Angeles, California, and worked in modeling and in small parts on television. She got her big break into show business on a Jack Benny Christmas show that was televised from the San Diego Naval Base. When Snowden walked across the stage in front of an audience of 10,000 sailors, the sailors cheered and whistled so enthusiastically that 11 Hollywood studios contacted her the next day. The event led to the newspaper headline "Sailors' Whistles Blow Blonde into Film Studio". Snowden chose Universal Pictures because of the training provided by its film school; she began voice and acting classes with Mara Corday, Pat Crowley, Clint Eastwood, James Garner, and John Saxon.

Snowden appeared in the films All That Heaven Allows, The Square Jungle, The Creature Walks Among Us, Outside the Law, I've Lived Before, and Hot Rod Rumble in addition to television appearances. Her last performance in movies was as Evie in The Comancheros (1961). Her last TV roles came in episodes of This Is Alice (1958) and Tightrope (1960).

In 1956, Snowden met accordionist Dick Contino at a party given by actor Tony Curtis. In September, after a three-month acquaintance, Snowden and Contino were married. Contino's family, who were Catholic, originally objected to the marriage because Snowden was divorced, but they relented and attended the civil ceremony in a Beverly Hills hotel. Snowden and Contino had three children together, in addition to her two children from her first marriage. Snowden left acting after her marriage and the birth of their first child. She sometimes appeared with him as a singer, in his nightclub acts.

== Return to acting ==
In 1971, Snowden appeared in the role of Maggie in the Fresno Community Theater production of Cat on a Hot Tin Roof by Tennessee Williams. She professed a love of the stage, though she claimed to be nervous about having to appear in her slip during most of the play's second act.

== Death ==
Snowden died of cancer, aged 52, on May 16, 1982 in North Hollywood, California.

== Filmography ==
=== Film ===
Year	Title	Role	Notes
1955	Kiss Me Deadly	Cheesecake	
1955	Francis in the Navy	Nurse Appleby	
1955	All That Heaven Allows	Jo-Ann Grisby	
1955	The Square Jungle	Lorraine Evans	
1956	The Creature Walks Among Us	Marcia Barton	
1956	Outside the Law	Maria Craven	
1956	The Rawhide Years	Miss Vanilla Bissell	
1956	I've Lived Before	Lois Gordon	
1956	Riddles in Rhythm	Leigh	Short film
1957	Hot Rod Rumble	Terri Warren	
1961	The Comancheros	Ada Belle	Uncredited

=== Television ===
Year	Title	Role	Notes
1954	The Jack Benny Program	Beautiful Girl	Episode: "The Life of Jack Benny"
1955	Studio 57		Episode: "The Will to Survive"
1955	The Mickey Rooney Show	Mona Sanders	Episode: "Star Struck"
1955	Lux Video Theatre	Haney Benson / Diane Baxter	2 episodes
1955–1959	The Bob Cummings Show	Chorus Girl / Cynthia / Doris	3 episodes
1958	This Is Alice	Betty Lou	3 episodes
1959	The Lineup	Helen	Episode: "Vengeful Knife"
1960	Tightrope!	Candy	Episode: "Three to Make Ready"
1960	Bachelor Father	Elaine Baker	Episode: "Where There's a Will"
1961	The Detectives	Susie	Episode: "One Lucky Break"
