= The Louisiana Hussy =

- Directed by: Lee Sholem
- Written by: Charles Lang
- Produced by: Charles M. Casinelli
- Starring: Nan Peterson; Peter Coe; Robert Richards; Betty Lynn; Harry Lauter; Rosalee Calvert; Tyler McVey; Howard Wright
- Cinematography: Ted Saizis; Vincent Saizis
- Edited by: John A. Bushelman
- Music by: Walter Greene
- Production company: Bon Aire Productions
- Distributed by: Howco International Pictures
- Release date: April 1, 1959
- Running time: 85 minutes
- Country: United States
- Language: English

The Louisiana Hussy is a 1959 American crime drama film directed by Lee Sholem and written by Charles Lang.

== Plot summary ==
Living in a small Louisiana Bayou community known as "The Pit", Cajun newlyweds Pierre and Lili must deal with family conflict compounded by the arrival in their lives of a mysterious seductress who calls herself "Minette" and claims to be fleeing from trouble. Not convinced she is being truthful, the couple find out that her real name is "Nina" and that she is impersonating a woman who had earlier committed suicide after having discovered that Nina was having an affair with her husband, Clay.

Meanwhile, Pierre's brother Jacques, has fallen in love with Nina, to the disapproval of his family. Pierre and Lili track down Clay's whereabouts but are convinced by his butler not to reveal the location of Nina. Clay, suspecting that the couple is hiding information, follows them back to their home but at the last minute decides not to confront Nina, realizing that she has caused enough pain in his life. Nina is told to leave The Pit and in the final scene, is picked up hitch hiking by a middle aged man driving a Cadillac. She tells that man that she is fleeing trouble and needs help.

== Cast ==
- Nan Peterson as Nina Duprez, alias Minette Lanier
- Robert Richards as Pierre Guillot
- Peter Coe as Jacques Guillot
- Betty Lynn as Lili Guillot
- Howard Wright as Cob
- Harry Lauter as Clay Lanier
- Rosalee Calvert as the real Minette Lanier
- Tyler McVey as Dr. J. B. Opie
- Smoki Whitfield as Burt, the manservant
- Helen Forrest as Callie, the grisgris woman

== Production ==
Rosalee Calvert was cast after being referred to the director by her then-husband and eventual co-star Peter Coe.

The filming took place in Morgan City, Louisiana, where it would later premiere.
