= Ruth Seinfel Goode =

American writer

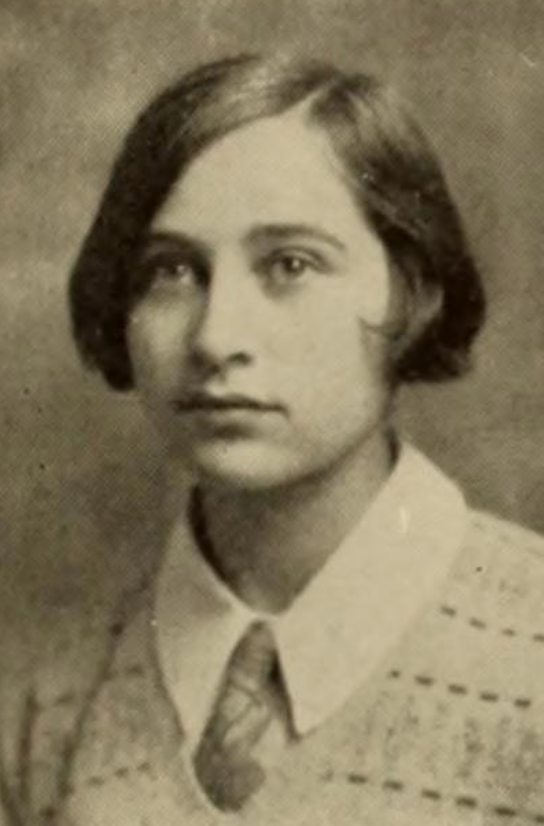
- Ruth Seinfel, from the 1925 yearbook of Smith College
- Born: May 1, 1905
- Died: October 27, 1997 (aged 92)
- Other names: Julia Rainer (pseudonym)
- Occupation: Writer

Ruth Seinfel Goode (May 1, 1905 – October 27, 1997) was an American writer and editor.

== Early life and education ==
Seinfel was born in Brooklyn, the daughter of Henry Seinfel and Helen Seinfel. Her parents were Jewish immigrants from Austria; her father worked in insurance. She graduated from Girls' High School of Brooklyn in 1921. That year, she was promoted as Brooklyn's "Perfect Girl", after high scores on academic and physical fitness tests. In 1925, she graduated from Smith College, where she was editor-in-chief of the school newspaper.

== Career ==
Seinfel wrote poetry as a girl, and over a hundred of her poems were published in her high school's newspaper. She also wrote articles and reviews for Collier's, The New York Post, The New York Times, and other publications. She covered dance topics for Musical Courier. In 1934 she became managing editor of The New York Woman, a weekly newspaper. She was senior staff writer at MD Medical Newsmagazine for over twenty years.

The New York Times called Seinfel's novel Lady Buyer (1933) "without doubt, the most vital and comprehensive story of a great department store yet to appear". She co-wrote Sol Hurok's memoir, Impresario (1946). With Scotty Mackenzie, she co-wrote My Love Affair with the State of Maine (1955); with Benjamin F. Miller, she co-wrote Man and His Body (1960). She co-wrote The Magic of Walking (1967) with Aaron Sussman.

Goode had a writing credit on Tonight We Sing (1953), a film adaptation of Sol Hurok's memoir. Under the pseudonym "Julia Rainer", she co-wrote Sexual Pleasure in Marriage (1959) and Sexual Adventure in Marriage (1965), both with her husband (he used the name "Jerome Rainer"). In the 1980s, she wrote study guides for Barron's, on books by Jane Austen, Pearl Buck, and Hermann Hesse.

== Selected books by Ruth Seinfel Goode ==
- Lady Buyer (1933)
- Impresario: A Memoir (1946, with Sol Hurok)
- My Love Affair with the State of Maine (1955, with Scotty Mackenzie)
- We Bought a Store (1956, with Gertrude Mackenzie)
- Sexual Pleasure in Marriage (1959, with Jerome Rainer)
- Man and his Body (1960, with Benjamin F. Miller)
- Sexual Adventure in Marriage (1965, with Jerome Rainer)
- The Magic of Walking (1967, with Aaron Sussman)
- People of the Ice Age (1973, with David Palladini)
- People of the First Cities (1977, with Richard Cuffari)
- A Book for Grandmothers (1977)
- Hands up! (1983, with Anthony Kramer)
- Jane Austen's Pride and Prejudice (1984)
- Hermann Hesse's Steppenwolf & Siddhartha (1985)
- Pearl Buck's The Good Earth (1985)

== Personal life ==
In 1927, Seinfel married theatrical publicist Gerald Goode (born Jerome Goodman). They had a son, Daniel, and a daughter, Judith. Her husband died in 1983. She died in 1997, aged 92 years, in New York.
