= Emergency Hospital =

1956 film

- Theatrical release poster
- Directed by: Lee Sholem
- Screenplay by: Don Martin
- Produced by: Howard W. Koch
- Starring: Walter Reed; Margaret Lindsay; John Archer; Byron Palmer; Rita Johnson; Peg La Centra
- Cinematography: William Margulies
- Edited by: John F. Schreyer
- Music by: Paul Dunlap
- Production companies: Schenck-Koch Productions; Bel-Air Productions
- Distributed by: United Artists
- Release date: November 2, 1956
- Running time: 62 minutes
- Country: United States
- Language: English

Emergency Hospital is a 1956 American drama film directed by Lee Sholem and written by Don Martin. The film stars Walter Reed, Margaret Lindsay, John Archer, Byron Palmer, Rita Johnson and Peg La Centra. The film was released on November 2, 1956, by United Artists.

== Cast ==
- Walter Reed as Police Sgt. Paul Arnold
- Margaret Lindsay as Dr. Janet Carey
- John Archer as Dr. Herb Ellis
- Byron Palmer as Ben Caldwell
- Rita Johnson as Head Nurse Norma Mullin
- Peg La Centra as Nurse Fran Richards
- Robert Keys as Police Officer Mike Flaherty
- Rhodes Reason as Juvenile Officer Ross
- Joy Lee as Nurse Mitzi
