= Georgine Darcy =

American actress (1933–2004)

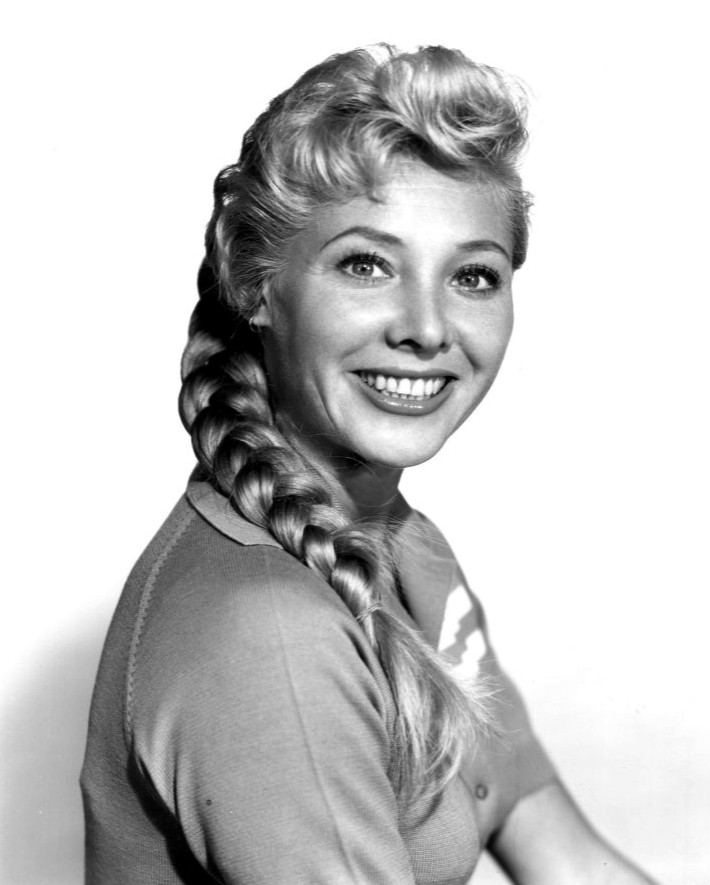
- Darcy in 1960
- Born: January 14, 1933; Brooklyn, New York, U.S.
- Died: July 18, 2004 (aged 71); Malibu, California, U.S.
- Other name: "Miss Torso"
- Occupations: Dancer, Actress
- Years active: 1954–1971
- Spouses: Jack Donohue (1955–?); Edward I. Gelb (1967–1969); Byron Palmer (1974–2004; her death)

Georgine Darcy (January 14, 1933 – July 18, 2004) was an American dancer and actress best known for her role as "Miss Torso" in the 1954 Alfred Hitchcock film Rear Window. She also had a regular role in the 1960-61 sitcom Harrigan and Son.

== Early life ==
Born in Brooklyn, Darcy was reputedly urged by her mother to become a stripper to make a "fast buck". She studied ballet, danced with the New York City Ballet, and modeled.

== Career ==
=== Rear Window ===
In 1954, Darcy was cast in Rear Window. She did not even know Hitchcock and did not consider herself an actress. Hitchcock selected her based on a publicity photo of her wearing a black leotard and green feather boa. In Rear Window, she played one of the neighbors of protagonist L.B. Jefferies (James Stewart), a temporarily disabled photographer who passes the time spying on the other tenants of his neighborhood. Her nameless character, who was dubbed "Miss Torso", practiced her dance moves in a skimpy top and a pair of pink shorts with a 21-inch waistband, courtesy of costume designer Edith Head.

During filming, Hitchcock asked her what kinds of pie she liked and disliked. She told him she loathed pumpkin pie. When it came time to film her character's reaction to finding a strangled dog, he presented her with pumpkin pie served with "crude Cockney jokes" to prompt an adverse response. On the last day of filming, Hitchcock and some of the cast presented her with a cake in the shape of her voluptuous figure. "It had the breasts and everything!" she said.

Hitchcock told Darcy that she should get an agent and that if she studied Anton Chekhov in Europe, he could make her a movie star when she returned. She ignored both pieces of advice and thought he was joking about the latter. She was paid $350 for her work in Rear Window and had a sporadic acting career.

=== Later career ===
Roger Perry and Georgine Darcy on TV's Harrigan and Son (1960)

Darcy's most substantive role was in the Chubby Checker film Don't Knock the Twist (1962) playing Madge Albright, a "dancing firestorm" who is part of a brother-sister dance team. She also appeared in the movies Women and Bloody Terror (1970) and The Delta Factor (1970).

On television, she played dancer Dawn Dubois on The Danny Thomas Show season five episode "You’ve Got to Be Miserable to Be Happy", and the irreverent secretary Gypsy for the title father-son team of lawyers in Harrigan and Son, played by Pat O'Brien and Roger Perry. She had guest appearances on Lee Marvin's M Squad, the Westinghouse Desilu Playhouse and Mannix.

Darcy was the subject of the 2004 documentary short film Remembering Miss Torso by director Malcolm Venville.

=== Personal life ===
Darcy was married to actor Byron Palmer for 30 years, until her death. In 2004, she died of natural causes at age 71. (At the time of her death, she was inaccurately reported to have been the last surviving credited cast member of Rear Window. However, that was untrue. Rand Harper, who played "Harry", the honeymooning groom, died in 2016, and Harry Landers, who played the uncredited role of Miss Lonelyheart's guest, died in 2017.)

== Filmography ==
- Love Me Madly (1954)
- Rear Window (1954) as Miss Torso
- Don't Knock the Twist (1962) as Madge Albright
- Women and Bloody Terror (1970) as Lauren Worthington
- The Delta Factor (1970) as Party Girl
