= Tonight We Sing =

1953 film by Mitchell Leisen

- Directed by: Mitchell Leisen
- Written by: Harry Kurnitz; George Oppenheimer
- Produced by: George Jessel
- Starring: David Wayne; Ezio Pinza; Roberta Peters
- Cinematography: Leon Shamroy
- Edited by: Dorothy Spencer
- Music by: Alfred Newman
- Production company: 20th Century Fox
- Distributed by: 20th Century Fox
- Release date: January 26, 1953
- Running time: 109 minutes
- Country: United States
- Language: English

Tonight We Sing is a 1953 American musical biopic film directed by Mitchell Leisen and starring David Wayne, Ezio Pinza, and Roberta Peters. It is based on the life and career of the celebrated impresario Sol Hurok.

The film is based on the 1946 book Impresario, an autobiography written by Sol Hurok with the help of Ruth Goode, who once served as Hurok's press agent. The film credits Hurok as technical advisor.

== Cast ==
- David Wayne as Sol Hurok
- Ezio Pinza as Feodor Chaliapin
- Roberta Peters as Elsa Valdine
- Anne Bancroft as Emma Hurok
- Tamara Toumanova as Anna Pavlova
- Isaac Stern as Eugène Ysaÿe
- Byron Palmer as Gregory Lawrence
  - Jan Peerce as Gregory Lawrence's singing voice
- Oskar Karlweis as Benjamin Golder
- Mikhail Rasumny as Nicolai
- Steven Geray as Prager
- Walter Woolf King as Gritti
- Lela Bliss as Mrs. Granek
- Harry Hayden as Mr. Granek
- Oscar Beregi as Dr. Markoff
- Isabel Withers as Emma's Maid
- Dudley Dickerson as Porter
- George E. Stone as Impresario
- Bertha Rosemond (Note: The classically trained vocalist/multi-instrumentalist Bertha Rosemond (15 at the time TWS was filmed, in 1952), has, beginning approximately 40 years later, become much better known as jazz pianist Bertha Hope, widow of fellow pianist Elmo Hope.) as Singer performing Joseph Barnby's "Sweet and Low" (Note: Barnby's setting of Alfred Lord Tennyson's text.) at Bronx Settlement House student recital (uncredited)

== Music ==
The film features performances of works from classical composers: Chopin, Gounod, Kreisler, Leoncavallo, Mussorgsky, Puccini, Rubinstein, Saint-Saëns, Sarasate, Verdi and Wieniawski. The film includes opera arias, duets and staged scenes from the operas: Boris Goudonov, Faust, Madama Butterfly, and La Traviata. Tamara Toumanova, in her role as Pavlova, performs in three ballet scenes within the film.

The tenor voice of Jan Peerce is heard in the picture as well as the RCA Victor soundtrack release.
