= Byron Palmer =

American actor (1920–2009)

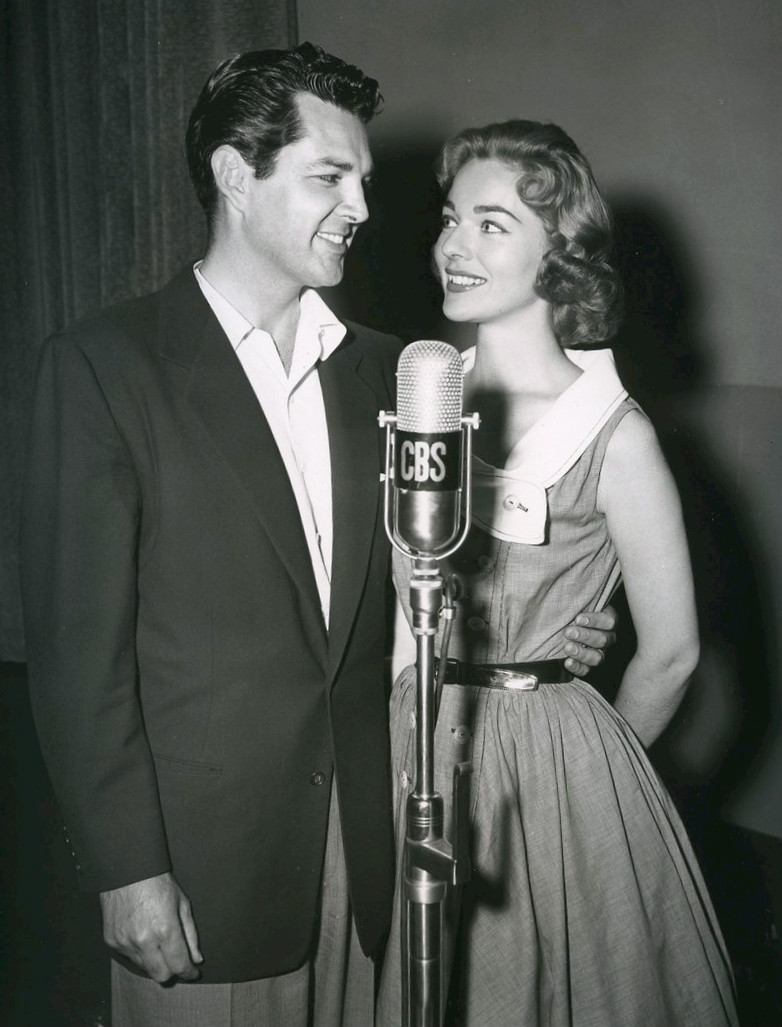
- Palmer and Joan Weldon on CBS Radio, 1955.
- Born: June 21, 1920; Los Angeles, California, US
- Died: September 30, 2009 (aged 89); Los Angeles, California, US
- Resting place: Hollywood Forever Cemetery
- Years active: 1951-1964
- Spouse(s): JoAnn Ransom (1941-1953) (divorced, 1 child); Ruth Hampton (1954-1967) (divorced, 2 children); Georgine Darcy (1974-2004) (her death)
- Children: 2

Byron Palmer (June 21, 1920 – September 30, 2009) was an American movie actor and television host.

== Early years ==
Palmer was the second of four children of Harlan G. Palmer, a politician, judge, and most notably the owner and publisher of the Hollywood Citizen-News. While attending Occidental College, Palmer wrote obituaries for his father's paper and later joined CBS as a page eventually leading him to become a CBS radio news reporter and announcer.

During World War II, Palmer joined the Army Air Forces and ran a radio station on an island in the Pacific. Between news broadcasts, he sang tenor on the air with a quartet called the Music Mates. Soldiers sent him fan mail that persuaded him to take voice lessons after the war.

== Film and stage ==
Palmer made his debut in film in the 1953 film Tonight We Sing. He starred with Jack Palance in Man in the Attic, with Gordon MacRae in The Best Things in Life Are Free and in several other films including Emergency Hospital and Ma and Pa Kettle at Waikiki and the 1956 film Glory. After acting as master of ceremonies for a touring “Hollywood on Ice” show, he starred with Ray Bolger in Where's Charley? on Broadway in 1948. He was also featured in the early 1950s Broadway revue "Bless You All" with Pearl Bailey, and the 1956 film Glory.

== Television ==
Palmer hosted the Miss Universe 1958 and Miss Universe 1959 beauty pageants on the CBS television network. Additionally, he hosted the syndicated variety program This is Your Music in 1955 and was co-host of Bride and Groom, which was originally broadcast on CBS and later on NBC in the 1950s.

Palmer made a number of television appearances, including episodes of Perry Mason, The Ed Sullivan Show, The Betty White Show, Pete and Gladys, How to Marry a Millionaire, Lawman, Soldiers of Fortune, Cavalcade of America, and Matinee Theatre.

== Personal life ==
Palmer married his high school sweetheart, JoAnn Ramson, in 1944. He later remarried to beauty queen and actress Ruth Hampton in 1954.

In 1974, Palmer remarried once again to actress and professional dancer Georgine Darcy who is best known for her role as Miss Torso in the highly acclaimed Alfred Hitchcock film Rear Window. They remained married until her death in 2004.

== Filmography ==
Year	Title	Role	Notes
1953	Tonight We Sing	Gregory Lawrence	
1953	Man in the Attic	Insp. Paul Warwick	
1955	Ma and Pa Kettle at Waikiki	Bob Baxter	
1956	Glory	Hoppy Hollis	
1956	The Best Things in Life Are Free	Hollywood Star	
1956	Emergency Hospital	Ben Caldwell	
