= Ma and Pa Kettle at Waikiki =

1955 film by Lee Sholem

- Directed by: Lee Sholem
- Screenplay by: Jack Henley; Harry Clork; Elwood Ullman
- Story by: Connie Lee Bennett
- Based on: The Egg and I by Betty MacDonald
- Produced by: Leonard Goldstein
- Starring: Marjorie Main; Percy Kilbride
- Cinematography: Clifford Stine
- Edited by: Virgil Vogel
- Music by: Henry Mancini
- Production company: Universal Studios
- Distributed by: Universal-International
- Release date: April 1955
- Running time: 79 minutes
- Country: United States
- Language: English
- Box office: $1,500,000 (U.S.)

Ma and Pa Kettle at Waikiki is a 1955 American comedy film directed by Lee Sholem. It is the seventh installment of Universal-International's Ma and Pa Kettle series starring Marjorie Main and Percy Kilbride in his final starring role.

== Plot ==
In July 1952, the Kettles help out cousin Rodney Kettle in Hawaii with his pineapple business. Ma and Pa get acquainted with blue-blooded Mrs. Andrews who thinks the Kettles are the "lowliest" people she has met. This is Percy Kilbride's last appearance as Pa Kettle, and his final movie as well.

Cousin Rodney (Loring Smith) has paid Ma and Pa Kettle's way to Hawaii, under the false assumption that Pa is a business genius who can help increase stalled business at the family pineapple factory.

Pa does come up with a solution, although purely by accident.

The Kettles also meet a Hawaiian family who are their "mirror image"---hard working Mother (Hilo Hattie), lazy Father (Lung), and twelve children named after the months of the year. Pa Kettle is naturally curious as to what will happen when the next child comes along.

Unscrupulous business rivals kidnap Pa, who remains innocently oblivious of his danger. Both large families converge on the hideout for a slapstick rescue mission, with Hawaiian food as the chief ammunition.

== Cast ==
- Marjorie Main as Ma Kettle
- Percy Kilbride as Pa Kettle
- Lori Nelson as Rosie Kettle
- Byron Palmer as Bob Baxter
- Russell Johnson as Eddie Nelson
- Hilo Hattie as Mama Lotus
- Loring Smith as Rodney Kettle
- Lowell Gilmore as Robert Coates
- Mabel Albertson as Teresa Andrews
- Fay Roope as Fulton Andrews
- Oliver Blake as Geoduck
- Teddy Hart as Crowbar
- Esther Dale as Birdie Hicks
- Claudette Thornton as Rodney Kettle's Secretary
- George Arglen as Willie Kettle
- Myron Healey (Kidnapper)
- Ben Welden (Kidnapper)
- Richard Reeves (Kidnapper)
- Charles Lung (Papa Lotus)

== Production ==
Although made in 1952, the film was not released for another 3 years, by which time the producer, Leonard Goldstein, had died.
