= Glory (1956 film) =

1956 film by David Butler

- Directed by: David Butler
- Written by: Gene Markey (story); Peter Milne
- Produced by: David Butler
- Starring: Margaret O'Brien; Walter Brennan; Charlotte Greenwood
- Cinematography: Wilfred M. Cline
- Edited by: Irene Morra
- Music by: Frank Perkins
- Production company: David Butler Productions
- Distributed by: RKO Radio Pictures
- Release date: January 11, 1956 (US)
- Running time: 100 minutes
- Country: United States
- Language: English

Glory is a 1956 American musical film directed by David Butler and starring Margaret O'Brien, Walter Brennan and Charlotte Greenwood. It was distributed by RKO Pictures.

== Plot ==
Agnes Tilbee's granddaughter Clarabell is excited about their Fairwood Farm's new foal, which she names Glory. Agnes is disappointed that it is a filly, because the horse is less likely to become a championship racehorse.

The farm has financial difficulties. Clarabell is attracted to wealthy Chad Chadburn, who allows Glory to board and train at his stable. Chad is said to be engaged to Candy Trent, a rich snob whose fast car sometimes spooks the horses.

Agnes cannot afford to pay her feed bill, but her former trainer Ned Otis comes to the rescue and pays the $50 that she owes. Clarabell is heartsick when Agnes says that the horse must be auctioned. Clarabell enters Glory in races, but Glory is unready and always loses. Glory goes lame, requiring care and a long rest.

Singer Hoppy Hollis takes an interest in Clarabell, who joins him on a song called "Glory' that becomes a success and earns them money. Agnes loses Glory in a poker game to Sobbing Sam Cooney, who is Chad's trainer, but Chad arranges for her to recover the horse.

Neighbors stake the entry fee for the Kentucky Derby so that Glory can be entered. Ned returns to train her, and Glory's surprising victory is a happy ending for all, including Clarabell and Chad, who are in love.

== Cast ==
- Margaret O'Brien as Clarabell Tilbee (singing voice dubbed by Norma Zimmer)
- Walter Brennan as Ned Otis
- Charlotte Greenwood as Miz Agnes Tilbee
- John Lupton as Chad Chadburn
- Byron Palmer as Hoppy Hollis
- Lisa Davis as Candy Trent
- Gus Schilling as Joe Page
- Hugh Sanders as Sobbing Sam Cooney
- Walter Baldwin as Doc Brock
- Harry Tyler as Beed Wickwire
- Leonid Kinskey as Vasily
- Paul E. Burns as Squeaky Bob
- Theron Jackson as Alexander
- Madge Blake as Aunt Martha
- Stuart Holmes as Derby Spectator
- Stanley Blystone as Derby Spectator
- Mauritz Hugo as Official at Horse Auction

== Songs ==
- "Calypso": Sung partially by Margaret O'Brien (dubbed by Norma Zimmer)
- "Gettin' Nowhere Road": Sung by Margaret O'Brien (dubbed by Norma Zimmer) and Byron Palmer
- "Happy Time Again": Sung partially by Byron Palmer
- "Glory": Sung by Byron Palmer, Margaret O'Brien (dubbed by Norma Zimmer) and Chorus
- "Kentucky Means Paradise": Sung by Byron Palmer, Margaret O'Brien (dubbed by Norma Zimmer) and Chorus

All songs written by M.K. Jerome (music) and Ted Koehler (lyrics).

== Reception ==
In a contemporary review for the Los Angeles Times, critic John L. Scott called Glory a "homey, sentimental little drama" and wrote: "'Glory' plays its familiar situations well, is enacted by a pleasant cast, and should find its best audience in the neighborhoods. ... Miss O'Brien is appealing though not as grownup [sic] as the ads would have you believe. Butler's direction is skillful."

== See also ==
- List of films about horses
- List of films about horse racing
