= I've Lived Before =

1956 film by Richard Bartlett

- Film poster by Reynold Brown
- Directed by: Richard Bartlett
- Written by: Norman Jolley; William Talman
- Produced by: Howard Christie
- Starring: Jock Mahoney; Leigh Snowden; Ann Harding; John McIntire; Raymond Bailey
- Cinematography: Maury Gertsman
- Edited by: Milton Carruth; Fred MacDowell
- Music by: Herman Stein
- Production company: Universal-International
- Distributed by: Universal Pictures
- Release date: September 1956
- Running time: 82 minutes
- Country: United States
- Language: English

I've Lived Before is a 1956 American fantasy drama film directed by Richard Bartlett and starring Jock Mahoney, Leigh Snowden, Ann Harding, John McIntire, and Raymond Bailey. The film was released by Universal-International Pictures in September 1956.

== Plot ==
In World War I, a fighter pilot is killed in a large dogfight, going down in flames.

At a 1931 air show in Schenectady, New York, a young boy named Johnny Bolan hops aboard an unattended biplane and takes it for a flight, despite having no training whatsoever, frightening his parents. He lands without problem, but cannot understand how or why he did it, saying, "I just did it like I've done it before."

In 1948, Captain Bolan, now a 30-year-old commercial pilot for Federal Airways, is flying a routine flight; he seems to recognize a woman passenger, but she says this is her first flight. He is about to land at a New York airport when he suddenly experiences visions of an aerial dogfight. He reacts by putting his airliner into a steep dive. His co-pilot, Russell, has to knock him to Bolan in order to take over the controls and land safely. No one is injured except Bolan.

When he regains consciousness in a hospital, Bolan is asked his name by Dr. Bryant. He responds, "Lt. Peter Stevens." Bolan is convinced he is a fighter pilot in France on April 19, 1918. Later, he regains his senses. Bolan then learns he has been temporarily grounded pending an investigation. However, he is obsessed with his alternate identity. He wants to find out all he can about Peter Stevens. Is he real? Did he exist? Did he fly over the skies of 1917 France? Did he survive? Is he still alive? Or dead? His only lead is a middle-aged woman, Jane Stone, who coincidentally was a passenger on that same plane that Bolan almost piloted into destruction. There's just one problem though. Jane, who claims to have been engaged to marry a pilot named Peter Stevens in 1917, refuses to answer any of Bolan's questions. It takes a meeting with Bolan's fiancée, Lois, and an interview moderated by Dr. Bryant that Bolan finally succeeds in solving the mystery of Peter Stevens.

== Cast ==
- Jock Mahoney as John Bolan / Lt. Peter Stevens
- Leigh Snowden as Lois Gordon
- Ann Harding as Mrs. Jane Stone
- John McIntire as Dr. Thomas Bryant
- Raymond Bailey as Joseph Hackett, Federal Airways
- Jerry Paris as Russell Smith, Copilot
- Simon Scott as Robert Allen, Attorney
- April Kent as Grace Hoydt, Stewardess
- Vernon Rich as Dave Anderson Federal's Lawyer
- Phil Harvey as Dr. Miller
- Brad Morrow as Johnny Bolan (12 years old)
- Beatrice Gray as Spectator (uncredited)
- James Seay as Fred Bolan (uncredited)
- Marjorie Stapp as Spectator (uncredited)
- Lorna Thayer as Mrs. Fred Bolan (uncredited)
- Madelon Mitchel as Daisy, Mrs. Stone's maid (uncredited)
