= Fay Roope =

American actor (1893–1961)

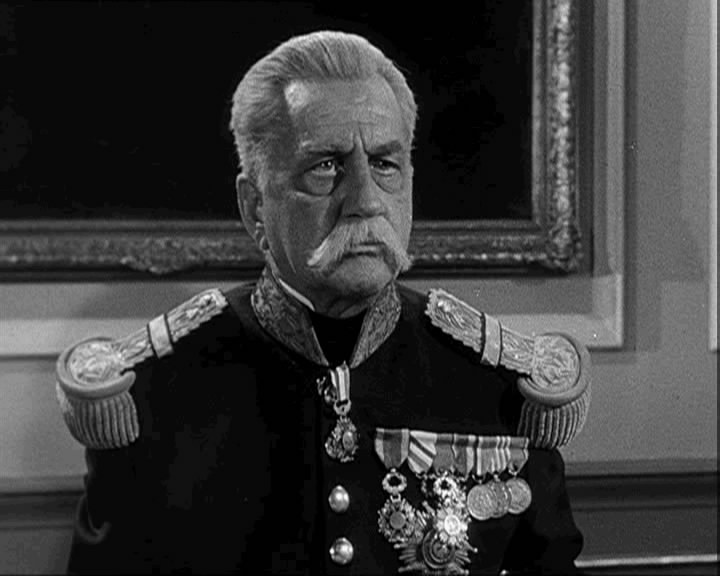
- Fay Roope in Viva Zapata (1952)
- Born: Winfield Harding Roope; October 20, 1893; Allston, Massachusetts, U.S.
- Died: September 13, 1961 (aged 67); Port Jefferson, New York, U.S.
- Education: Harvard University, B.A. 1916
- Occupation: Actor
- Years active: 1922–1961

Fay Roope (born Winfield Harding Roope; October 20, 1893 – September 13, 1961) was a Harvard graduate and a character actor who appeared in American theater in New York City from the 1920s through 1950, and in American film and television from 1949 through 1961.

== Early life ==
Winfield Harding Roope was born October 20, 1893, in Allston, Massachusetts, near Boston, the only son of George Winfield Roope and Lucie Mattie Jacobs, a wealthy couple listed in Newton's Blue Book. He "prepared" at Stone School for Boys, a Boston boarding school, and attended Harvard University from 1912 to 1916. During his time there he appeared in varied dramatic and musical roles in school productions. He received a Bachelor of Arts degree from the university in 1916.

== Acting career ==
He began acting professionally on stage in New York City in the early 1920s, and continued to do so for almost thirty years, appearing both off and on Broadway. He moved into film around 1950. He did do some television in the early 1950s, but did most of his television work in dramas during the last five years of his life, from 1955 on.

=== Broadway career ===
His first appearance on the Broadway stage was in the musical revue One Helluva Night, on June 4, 1924. From September 5, 1924, until September 12, 1925, he played Lieutenant Aldrich in the drama What Price Glory?. From March 30, 1949, to April 9, 1949, he played Colonel Jared Rumley in the comedy The Biggest Thief in Town. His last appearance on Broadway was in the first Broadway production of The Madwoman of Chaillot, June 13–25, 1950.

=== Film career ===
Fay Roope portrayed generals, admirals, and colonels in such movies as From Here To Eternity, Rock Hudson's Seminole, the Gary Cooper comedy You're in the Navy Now, and the original version of the science-fiction classic film The Day the Earth Stood Still. He played Mexican president Porfirio Díaz in the movie Viva Zapata!.

==== Film roles ====
- You're in the Navy Now (1951) - Carrier Admiral (uncredited)
- The Frogmen (1951) - Adm. Dakers (uncredited)
- The Day the Earth Stood Still (1951) - Major General (uncredited)
- Callaway Went Thataway (1951) - Tom Lorrison
- Indian Uprising (1952) - Maj. Gen. George Crook (uncredited)
- Viva Zapata! (1952) - President Porfirio Díaz
- My Six Convicts (1952) - Warden George Potter
- Deadline - U.S.A. (1952) - Surrogate Court Judge McKay (uncredited)
- Carbine Williams (1952) - Ed - District Attorney
- Young Man with Ideas (1952) - Kyle Thornhill
- The Brigand (1952) - Mons. De Laforce
- Washington Story (1952) - Caswell
- Assignment – Paris! (1952) - American Ambassador (uncredited)
- The Clown (1953) - Doctor Strauss
- Down Among the Sheltering Palms (1953) - Colonel Thomas B. Richards (uncredited)
- All Ashore (1953) - Commodore Stanton
- Seminole (1953) - Col. Zachary Taylor
- The System (1953) - Roger Stuart
- The Charge at Feather River (1953) - Lt. Col. Kilrain
- From Here to Eternity (1953) - Gen. Slater (uncredited)
- Clipped Wings (1953) - Col. Davenport
- A Lion Is in the Streets (1953) - Governor Charles Snowden (uncredited)
- Man of Conflict (1953) - Ed Jenks
- Alaska Seas (1954) - Captain Walt Davis
- The Lone Gun (1954) - Mayor Booth
- Living It Up (1954) - Man
- The Black Dakotas (1954) - John Lawrence
- Naked Alibi (1954) - Commissioner F.J. O'Day
- The Last Time I Saw Paris (1954) - City Editor (uncredited)
- The Atomic Kid (1954) - Gen. Lawlor
- Ma and Pa Kettle at Waikiki (1955) - Fulton Andrews
- The Proud Ones (1956) - Markham
- The Rack (1956) - Col. Dudley Smith
- The True Story of Jesse James (1957) - Tom Trope (uncredited)
- The FBI Story (1959) - Dwight McCutcheon

=== Television career ===
Faye Roope played judges in Raymond Burr's Perry Mason TV series, had a continuing role as Mr. Botkin in the long-lasting western Gunsmoke, and appeared as an older man of authority in many TV Westerns of the 1950s. He played the old-west hanging judge in the classic 1960 Twilight Zone time-travel episode Execution, and appeared in many of the classic drama anthology shows of American television's Golden Age.

==== Roles in television episodes ====
- The Philco Television Playhouse
  The Beautiful Bequest (1949)
- The Ford Television Theatre
  Junior (1952)
- Mr. & Mrs. North
  Till Death Do Us Part (1952) - Edward Barry
  House Behind the Wall (1953) - Richard Burton
- Fireside Theatre
  Grey Gardens (1953) - Justin
- Racket Squad
  The Knockout (1951) - Clayton Carswell
  The Strange Case of James Doyle (1952) - Jim Doyle
  Sting of Fate (1953) - Albert (Husband)
- The Lone Ranger
  Message to Fort Apache (1954) - Colonel Gaines
- City Detective
  The Blonde Orchid (1954) - Police Commissioner Ralph
- The Public Defender
  The Case of the Parolee (1954) - Mr. Marshall
- Climax!
  A Man of Taste (1955)
- The Millionaire
  The Jerome Wilson Story (1955) - Dr. Tom Evans
- Screen Directors Playhouse
  Want Ad Wedding (1955) - Reverend Walker
- Studio 57
  Cubs of the Bear (1954) - Amos Harlock
  The Senorita and the Texan (1955) - Don Luis
- Soldiers of Fortune
  The General (1955) - General DeSaba
- Celebrity Playhouse
  Tantrum Size 12 (1956)
- Ford Star Jubilee
  The Day Lincoln Was Shot (1956)
- Broken Arrow
  Indian Medicine (1957) - Tyoe
- Tales of Wells Fargo
  The Inscrutable Man (1957) - Mr. Harper
- Zane Grey Theater
  The Bitter Land (1957) - Morgan Batterson
- Schlitz Playhouse of Stars
  The Lonely Wizard (1957) - Dr. Elliott
- The Californians
  The Search for Lucy Manning (1957)
- Code 3
  The Man with Many Faces (1957) - Dr. Matthews
- Panic!
  Child's Play (1957) - Charlie Jennings
- Dr. Hudson's Secret Journal
  Dr. Means' Surgery (1955) (as Fay Roupe) - Chairman
  Love in White Shoes (1957)
- The Adventures of Jim Bowie
  Bayou Tontine (1957) - Etienne Broussard
  Curfew Cannon (1958) - Etienne Rochambeau
- The Life and Legend of Wyatt Earp
  Frontier Journalism was Fearless (1955) - Colonel Josh Clanton
  The Frontier Theatre (1956) - Older Actor
  The Underdog (1958) - Uncle George Jackson
- The Court of Last Resort
  The Westover Case (1958) - Dan Tackberry
- Dragnet
  The Big Oskar (1958) - Oskar Hovejg
- Perry Mason
  The Case of the Gilded Lily (1958) - Judge Kyle
  The Case of the Hesitant Hostess (1958) - Judge
- The Rifleman
  The Brother-in-Law (1958) - Jeff Stacey
  The Legacy (1959) - Doc Burrage
  The Spiked Rifle (1959) - Barton
  Panic (1959) - Doc Burrage
- Bonanza
  The Magnificent Adah (1959) - Castellan
- Gunsmoke
  Change of Heart (1959) - Mr. Botkin
  Murder Warrant (1959) - Mr. Botkin
  The F.U. (1959) - Mr. Botkin
- Have Gun, Will Travel
  Killer's Widow (1958) - E.J. Randolph
  Alaska (1959) - Wade
- Rawhide
  Incident on the Edge of Madness (1959) - Mayor Haslip
- Tate
  The Gunfighters (1960) - Keefer
- The Chevy Mystery Show
  Fear Is the Parent (1960) - Dow
- The Texan
  Desert Passage (1958) - Ben Atkins
  The Accuser (1960) - Mr. Benton
- The Twilight Zone
  Execution (1960) - Judge
- Cheyenne
  Gold, Glory and Custer - Prelude (1960) - Commissioner Brady
  Gold, Glory and Custer - Requiem (1960) - Commissioner Brady
- The Tom Ewell Show
  The Old Magic (1961) - Mr. Dutton (final appearance)

== Personal life and death ==
Fay Roope married Marie Teresa Roope. They had two children, Martha and George, and many grandchildren. He died on September 13, 1961, in Port Jefferson, New York, aged 67.
