= Raymond Bailey =

American actor (1904–1980)

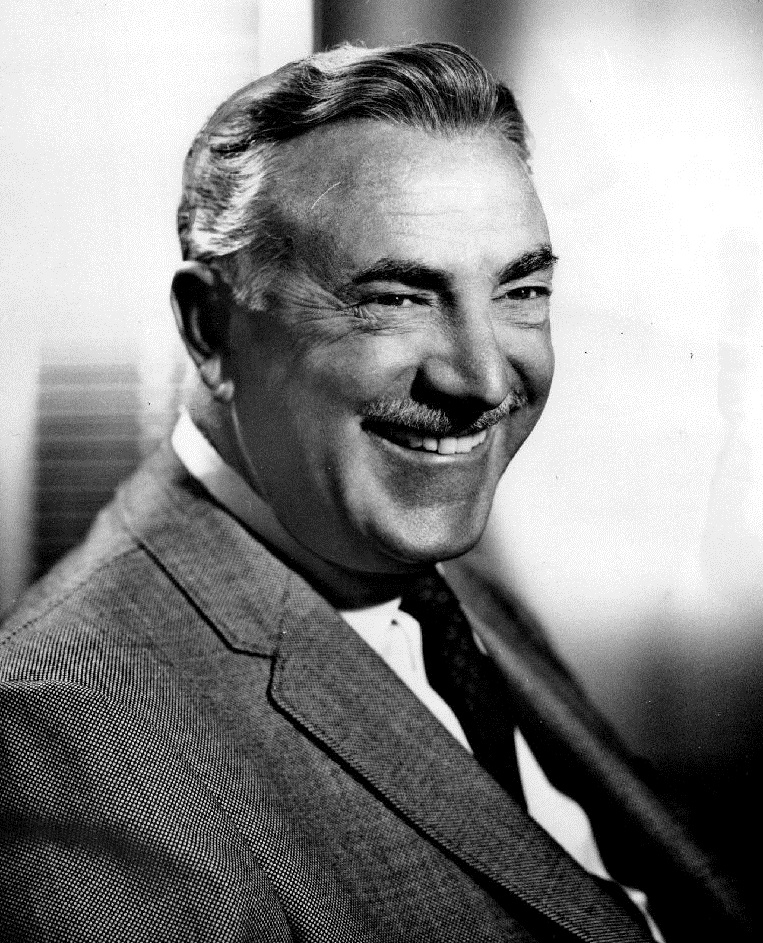
- Bailey in 1965
- Born: Raymond Thomas Bailey; May 6, 1904; San Francisco, California, US
- Died: April 15, 1980 (aged 75); Irvine, California, US
- Resting place: Ashes scattered at sea
- Other name: Ray Bailey
- Occupation: Actor
- Years active: 1938–1975
- Spouse: Gaby Aida George

Raymond Thomas Bailey (May 6, 1904 – April 15, 1980) was an American actor on the Broadway stage, films, and television. He is best known for his role as greedy banker Milburn Drysdale in the television series The Beverly Hillbillies.

== Early life and attempts at acting ==
Bailey was born in San Francisco, California, the son of William and Alice (née O'Brien) Bailey. When he was a teenager he went to Hollywood to become a movie star. He found it was harder than he had thought, however, and took a variety of short-term jobs. He worked for a time as a day laborer at a movie studio in the days of silent pictures, but was fired for sneaking into a mob scene while it was being filmed. He also worked for a while as a stockbroker and a banker.

Having no success receiving movie roles of any kind, Bailey then went to New York City where he had no better success obtaining roles in theatre. Eventually, he began working as a merchant seaman and sailed to various parts of the world, including China, Japan, the Philippines and the Mediterranean. While docked in Hawaii, he worked on a pineapple plantation, acted at the community theatre and sang on a local radio program.

== Success on the second try at acting ==
In 1938, he decided to try Hollywood again. His luck changed for the better when he actually began getting some bit parts in movies. He appeared as the character of Mr. West in the action adventure serial The Green Hornet (1940). After the United States entered World War II he again served in the United States Merchant Marine. When the war was over he returned to Hollywood and eventually began getting bigger character roles.

== Early roles in television, Broadway and film ==
=== Television ===
In the early 1950s, Bailey was cast in many character roles in television series, such as Alfred Hitchcock Presents, Tales of Tomorrow (episode "Ice from Space"), Frontier, Crusader, My Friend Flicka (episode "When Bugles Blow"), Gunsmoke (episodes "General Parsley Smith" and "The Big Con"), Tightrope!, State Trooper, Coronado 9, and Johnny Ringo.

Other appearances were on The George Burns and Gracie Allen Show, Private Secretary, Playhouse 90, The Rifleman, Laramie, Bat Masterson, The Jack Benny Program, Yancy Derringer, Riverboat, Bourbon Street Beat, 77 Sunset Strip, Hennesey, The Twilight Zone, three times on Bonanza, One Step Beyond, The Untouchables, Have Gun – Will Travel, The Tab Hunter Show, Pete and Gladys, The Donna Reed Show, Bachelor Father, Going My Way, The Tom Ewell Show, The Investigators, Science Fiction Theatre (episode "The Long Day"), Whirlybirds, twice on Mister Ed, and twice on Wagon Train.

Bailey made two guest appearances on Perry Mason, playing banker Mr. Hilliard in "The Case of the Caretaker's Cat," and Dr. Bell in "The Case of the Injured Innocent." During its 1960–1961 season, he had a regular role on My Sister Eileen and guest-starred on Pat O'Brien's ABC sitcom Harrigan and Son. He appeared in the 1962–1963 season as Dean McGruder on CBS's The Many Loves Of Dobie Gillis.

=== Broadway plays ===
Bailey appeared in four Broadway plays, as Howard Haines in Last Stop (1944), playing an unknown man in The Bat (1953), A. J. Alexander in Sing Till Tomorrow (1953), and Captain Randolph Southard in The Caine Mutiny Court-Martial (1954–1955), which starred Henry Fonda.

=== Film roles ===
Bailey's film roles include playing a member of the board in the comedy/romance Sabrina (1954) starring Humphrey Bogart, Audrey Hepburn and William Holden; Mr. Benson in the drama Picnic (1955) starring William Holden and Kim Novak; a doctor in Hitchcock's drama/thriller Vertigo (1958) starring James Stewart and Novak; a Colonel in the comedy No Time for Sergeants (1958) starring Andy Griffith; the warden of San Quentin in the crime/dramas I Want to Live! starring Susan Hayward and as Philip Dressler in The Lineup (1958); lawyer Brancato in the crime drama Al Capone (1959) starring Rod Steiger; and Major General Alexander "Archie" Vandegrift in the World War II drama The Gallant Hours (1960). He also played a plantation owner in Band of Angels (1957) starring Clark Gable, Sidney Poitier and Yvonne De Carlo. He also played in the low-budget horror classic, Tarantula! (1955), and had a small role in Irwin Allen's Five Weeks in a Balloon (1962).

== Mr. Drysdale on The Beverly Hillbillies ==
In The Beverly Hillbillies, Nancy Kulp portrayed Bailey's ever loyal and by-the-book secretary, Miss Jane Hathaway, who called him Chief. Banker Drysdale managed the millions of dollars in oil money royalties in the bank account of country gentleman Jed Clampett (portrayed by Buddy Ebsen). He was so keen on keeping an eye on the Clampetts that he convinced them to buy the mansion right next door to his own, in ritzy Beverly Hills. Often, Mr. Drysdale would be required to talk with Clampett about how strange "city life" and "city folk" are (when compared to Mr. Clampett's view of "normal" country folk). On occasions when Mr. Clampett was considering withdrawing all his funds and returning to the country (his home near Bug Tussle), the miserly Mr. Drysdale would often panic and desperately work to try keep the family (and their fortune) in Beverly Hills.

Bailey began feeling the symptoms of Alzheimer's disease around the time of the final episodes of The Beverly Hillbillies. He made only two film appearances after the show's 1971 cancellation – the Disney features Herbie Rides Again (1974) and The Strongest Man in the World (1975) — before retiring in 1975 due to the effects of the disease.

In his final years, Bailey divided his time between a condominium and a houseboat in Laguna Niguel, California. He kept in touch with former co-star Nancy Kulp (whom he nicknamed "Slim") but was primarily a recluse.

== Death ==
Bailey died of a heart attack on April 15, 1980, aged 75, in Irvine, California. His body was cremated and his ashes were scattered at sea.

== Selected filmography ==
- Blackwell's Island (1939) as Cash Sutton, a Henchman (uncredited)
- Made for Each Other (1939) as Salt Lake City Hospital Chemist (uncredited)
- Secret Service of the Air (1939) as Klune, Henchman Starting Fight (uncredited)
- The Adventures of Jane Arden (1939) as Vanders' Henchman Driving Car (uncredited)
- S.O.S. Tidal Wave (1939) as Roy Nixon
- Daredevils of the Red Circle (1939, Serial) as Stanley, Secretary [Chs. 1–3, 11]
- Hell's Kitchen (1939) as Whitey
- They All Come Out (1939) as Hughie (uncredited)
- Each Dawn I Die (1939) as Convict (uncredited)
- I Stole a Million (1939) as Cabby (uncredited)
- Coast Guard (1939) as First Officer (uncredited)
- Flight at Midnight (1939) as Bill Hawks
- Sabotage (1939) (uncredited)
- The Roaring Twenties (1939) as 2nd Ex-Con (uncredited)
- Invisible Stripes (1939) as Bookie (uncredited)
- The Green Hornet (1940) as Mr. West [Ch. 6] (uncredited)
- Black Friday (1940) as Louis Devore (uncredited)
- Forgotten Girls (1940) as Reporter (uncredited)
- Island of Doomed Men (1940) as Mystery Killer (uncredited)
- Florian (1940) as White-haired Soldier (uncredited)
- I Love You Again (1940) as First Man Greeting Wilson in Pottery Office (uncredited)
- The Secret Seven (1940) as Racketeer (uncredited)
- A Man Betrayed (1941) as Amato Henchman (uncredited)
- The People vs. Dr. Kildare (1941) as Father (uncredited)
- The Male Animal (1942) as Reporter on Porch (uncredited)
- The Mystery of Marie Roget (1942) as Gendarme (uncredited)
- Embraceable You (1948) as Truck Driver (uncredited)
- The Girl from Jones Beach (1949) as Party Guest (uncredited)
- The Kangaroo Kid (1950) as Quinn
- Sabrina (1954) as Member of the Board (uncredited)
- Tarantula! (1955) as Townsend
- The Girl in the Red Velvet Swing (1955) as Judge Fitzgerald (uncredited)
- The Return of Jack Slade (1955) as Professor
- Picnic (1955) as Mr. Benson
- Time Table (1956) as Sam Hendricks (uncredited)
- Outside the Law (1956) as Philip Bormann
- Congo Crossing (1956) as Peter Mannering
- I've Lived Before (1956) as Joseph Hackett, Federal Airways
- Away All Boats (1956) as Rear Admiral Stacy Bender (uncredited)
- The Girl He Left Behind (1956) as General
- The Great American Pastime (1956) as George Carruthers
- The Incredible Shrinking Man (1957) as Doctor Thomas Silver
- Band of Angels (1957) as Mr. Stuart
- Darby's Rangers (1958) as Brigadier General W.A. Wise
- Underwater Warrior (1958) as Admiral Ashton
- Lafayette Escadrille (1958) as Amos J. Walker
- The Lineup (1958) as Philip Dressler
- Vertigo (1958) as Scottie's Doctor
- No Time for Sergeants (1958) as Base Colonel
- The Space Children (1958) as Dr. Wahrman
- King Creole (1958) as Mr. Evans, School Principal
- I Want to Live! (1958) as San Quentin Warden
- Al Capone (1959) as Lawyer Brancato
- Wake Me When It's Over (1960) as General Weigang
- The Gallant Hours (1960) as Major General Archie Vandergrift
- From the Terrace (1960) as Mr. Eugene St. John
- The Absent Minded Professor (1961) as Admiral Olmstead
- Five Weeks in a Balloon (1962) as Randolph
- Herbie Rides Again (1974) as Lawyer
- The Strongest Man in the World (1975) as Regent Burns (final film role)

== Selected television appearances ==
- Gunsmoke (1955–1958) (2 episodes)
  - (Season 1 Episode 11: "General Parsley Smith") (1955) as General Parsley Smith
  - (Season 3 Episode 34: "The Big Con") (1958) as Shaneways
- Crusader (1956) (2 episodes)
  - (Season 1 Episode 20: "Freezeout") as Boxing Commissioner
  - (Season 2 Episode 11: "The Boy on the Brink") as Louis Craddock
- Lux Video Theatre (1956–1957) (3 episodes)
  - (Season 6 Episode 18: "Witness to Murder") (1956) as Donnelly
  - (Season 7 Episode 36: "Payment in Kind") (1957) as Sheriff Griffin
  - (Season 7 Episode 47: "Diagnosis: Homicide") (1957) as Parkinson
- Matinee Theatre (1956–1957) (3 episodes)
  - (Episode 49: "The Gate") (1956)
  - (Episode 162: "The Starmaster") (1957)
  - (Episode 194: "One for All") (1957)
- General Electric Theatre (1956–1961) (3 episodes)
  - (Season 4 Episode 22: "Try to Remember") (1956) as Richards
  - (Season 9 Episode 28: "Sis Bowls 'Em Over") (1961) as Peterson
- Alfred Hitchcock Presents (1956–1962) (10 episodes)
  - (Season 1 Episode 7: "Breakdown") (1956) as Ed Johnson
  - (Season 1 Episode 10: "The Case of Mr. Pelham") (1956) as Dr. Harley
  - (Season 1 Episode 28: "Portrait of Jocelyn") (1956) as Jeff Harrison
  - (Season 2 Episode 30: "The Three Dreams of Mr. Findlater") (1957) as uncredited Psychiatrist in introduction
  - (Season 3 Episode 12: "Miss Paisley's Cat") (1957) as Inspector Graun
  - (Season 3 Episode 16: "Sylvia") (1958) as Dr. Jason
  - (Season 3 Episode 27: "Disappearing Trick") (1958) as Herbert Gild
  - (Season 5 Episode 18: "Backward, Turn Backward") (1960) as Mr. Harris
  - (Season 6 Episode 5: "The Five-Forty-Eight") (1960) as Mr. Watkins
  - (Season 7 Episode 38: " Where Beauty Lies") (1962) as The Doctor
- M Squad (1957) (Season 1 Episode 13: "Family Portrait") as Hinder's Lawyer
- The Real McCoys (1957) (Season 1 Episode 4: "Grandpa Sells His Gun") as Mr. Peabody (credited as Ray Bailey)
- Whirlybirds (1957) (3 episodes)
  - (Season 1 Episode 4: "Fire Flight") as Culver
  - (Season 1 Episode 5: "Hot Wire") as Mr. Culver
  - (Season 1 Episode 21: "The Black Pearl") as Mr. Culver
- Playhouse 90 (1957–1959) (3 episodes)
  - (Season 1 Episode 34: "Winter Dreams") (1957) as Mr. Holt
  - (Season 2 Episode 24: "Point of No Return") (1958) as Mr. Slade
  - (Season 3 Episode 20: "The Raider") (1959) as Mr. Stern
- Dick Powell's Zane Grey Theatre (1957–1960) (5 episodes)
  - (Season 1 Episode 18: "Backtrail") (1957) as March Beckworth
  - (Season 2 Episode 14: "Trial by Fear") (1958) as Baker, Juror
  - (Season 3 Episode 9: "Pressure Point") (1958) as Ed Fowler
  - (Season 4 Episode 28: "Deception") (1960) as Sheriff
  - (Season 4 Episode 29: "Stagecoach to Yuma") (1960) as Chase Barlow
- Mike Hammer (1958) (Season 1 Episode 9: "Lead Ache") as Mike Cowan
- The Silent Service (1958) (Season 2 Episode 20: "The Grayling Story") as Admiral Christie
- Westinghouse Desilu Playhouse (1958) (Season 1 Episode 2: "The Case for Dr. Mudd")
- Bat Masterson (1958–1960) (2 episodes)
  - (Season 1 Episode 2: "Two Graves for Swan Valley") (1958) as Tom Noble
  - (Season 3 Episode 12: "Death by Decree") (1960) as Justice Bradshaw
- Walt Disney Presents (1958–1961) (2 episodes)
  - (Season 5 Episode 11: "Law and Order, Incorporated") (1958) as Arnold Bixby
  - (Season 7 Episode 25: "Texas John Slaughter: Frank Clell's in Town") (1961) as Mark Morgan
- The Rifleman (1959) (Season 1 Episode 18: "The Photographer") as Colonel Jess Whiteside
- Yancy Derringer (1959) (Season 1 Episode 16: "Mayhem at the Market") as Colonel Duval
- Alcoa Theatre (1959) (Season 2 Episode 15: "Boyden vs. Bunty (Dear Mom, Dear Dad)") as Dean Gregory
- The Donna Reed Show (1959) (Season 2 Episode 3: "A Penny Earned") as George Collier
- Alcoa Presents: One Step Beyond (1959) (Season 2 Episode 3: "Brainwave") as Captain Clyde Madison
- Bronco (1959) (Season 2 Episode 2: "The Burning Springs") as General W.E. Miles
- Tightrope! (1959) (Season 1 Episode 6: "Thousand Dollar Bill") as Commissioner Rodger Dom
- Bourbon Street Beat (1959) (Season 1 Episode 4: "Woman in the River") as Anthony Picard
- 77 Sunset Strip (1959–1960) (3 episodes)
  - (Season 1 Episode 30: "The Widow Wouldn't Weep") (1959) as Philip Harkins
  - (Season 2 Episode 30: "Genesis of Treason") (1960) as Ben Salway
  - (Season 3 Episode 15: "The Dresden Doll") (1960) as Steven Stewart
- Perry Mason (1959–1961) (2 episodes)
  - (Season 2 Episode 19: "The Case of the Caretaker's Cat") (1959) as Mr. Hilliard
  - (Season 5 Episode 10: "The Case of the Injured Innocent") (1961) as Dr. Bell
- Bonanza (1959–1962) (3 episodes)
  - (Season 1 Episode 15: "The Last Hunt") (1959) as Sumner Kyle
  - (Season 3 Episode 34: "The Miracle Maker") (1962) as Sam Blanchard
  - (Season 4 Episode 9: "The Beginning") (1962) as Judge Griffith
- Laramie (1959–1962) (3 episodes)
  - (Season 1 Episode 12: "Man of God") (1959) as Colonel Carlington
  - (Season 3 Episode 5: "The Fatal Step") (1961) as Burch
  - (Season 3 Episode 21: "The Runt") (1962) as Gillis
- Have Gun – Will Travel (1959–1962) (3 episodes)
  - (Season 2 Episode 18: "Lady on the Stagecoach") (1959) as Clyde Barnes
  - (Season 3 Episode 13: "Charley Red Dog") (1959) as John Staffer
  - (Season 5 Episode 34: "Cream of the Jest") (1962) as Walter B. Jonas M.D.
- The Twilight Zone (1959–1964) (3 episodes)
  - (Season 1 Episode 6: "Escape Clause") (1959) as Doctor
  - (Season 2 Episode 13: "Back There") (1961) as Millard
  - (Season 5 Episode 20: "From Agnes - With Love") (1964) as Supervisor
- The Texan (1960) Season 2 Episode 39: "Mission to Monterey") as Consul James Wade
- Johnny Ringo (1960) (2 episodes)
  - (Season 1 Episode 15: "The Poster Incident") as Mr. King
  - (Season 1 Episode 28: "Judgment Day") as Summers
- The Untouchables (1960) (3 episodes) as John Carvell
  - (Season 1 Episode 25: "Portrait of a Thief")
  - (Season 1 Episode 26: "The Underworld Bank")
  - (Season 2 Episode 2: "Jack 'Legs' Diamond")
- Wagon Train (1960–1961) (2 episodes)
  - (Season 3 Episode 35: "The Charlene Brenton Story") (1960) as Jim Brenton
  - (Season 5 Episode 10: "The Lizbeth Ann Calhoun Story") (1961) as Major Hanley
- Lassie (1961) (Season 7 Episode 29: "The Pigeon") as General Steele
- The Many Loves of Dobie Gillis (1960–1961) (7 episodes) as Dean Magruder
  - (Season 3 Episode 1: "The Ruptured Duck") (1961)
  - (Season 3 Episode 7: "Eat, Drink, and Be Merry... for Tomorrow, Ker-Boom") (1961)
  - (Season 3 Episode 20: "The Big Blunder and Egg Man") (1962)
  - (Season 3 Episode 27: "I Remember Muu Muu") (1962)
  - (Season 3 Episode 31: "It Takes a Heap o' Livin' to Make a Cave a Home") (1962)
  - (Season 4 Episode 1: "A Funny Thing Happened to Me on the Way to a Funny Thing") (1962)
  - (Season 4 Episode 6: "What Makes the Varsity Drag?") (1962)
- The Alfred Hitchcock Hour (1962) (Season 1 Episode 1: "A Piece of the Action") as Allie Saxon
- Dr. Kildare (1962) (Season 1 Episode 28: "The Horn of Plenty") (1962) as Dr. Jerry Wagner
- My Three Sons (1962–1963) (2 episodes)
  - (Season 2 Episode 19: "Bub Gets a Job") (1962) as Mr. Dennis
  - (Season 3 Episode 32: "Let's Take Stock") (1963) as Harvey Reynolds
- Mister Ed (1962–1965) (2 episodes)
  - (Season 2 Episode 14: "Ed the Beneficiary") (1962) as Howard Dieterle
  - (Season 6 Episode 5: "Love and the Single Horse") (1965) as Mr. Durvis
- The Beverly Hillbillies (1962–1971) (TV Series) (248 episodes) as Milburn Drysdale
