= Russell Johnson =

American actor (1924–2014)

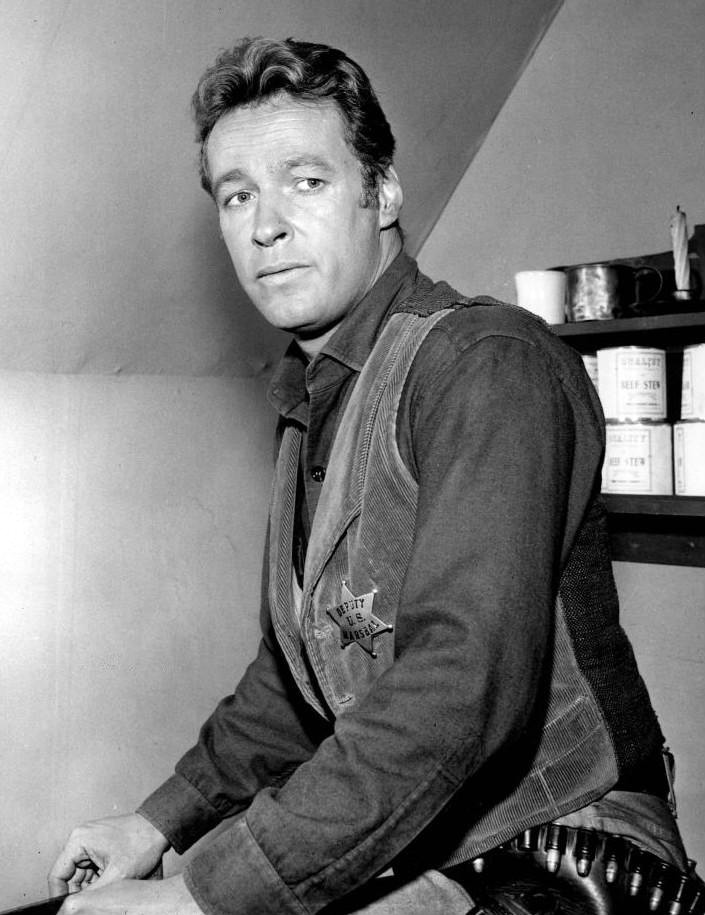
- Johnson in Black Saddle (1960)
- Born: Russell David Johnson; November 10, 1924; Ashley, Pennsylvania, U.S.
- Died: January 16, 2014 (aged 89); Bainbridge Island, Washington, U.S.
- Occupation: Actor
- Years active: 1950–1997
- Known for: Gilligan's Island as Professor Roy Hinkley; This Island Earth; Rescue from Gilligan's Island; The Castaways on Gilligan's Island; The Harlem Globetrotters on Gilligan's Island
- Spouses: Edith Cahoon (m. 1943; div. 1948); Kay Cousins (m. 1949; died 1980); Constance Dane (m. 1982)
- Children: 3

Russell David Johnson (November 10, 1924 – January 16, 2014) was an American actor. He played Professor Roy Hinkley in Gilligan's Island and Marshal Gib Scott in Black Saddle.

== Early life ==
Johnson was born in Ashley, Pennsylvania, on November 10, 1924, to Russell Kennedy Johnson (1901–1932) and Marion Wenonah Smink Johnson (1902–1976).

Johnson was the eldest of seven siblings: Kenneth Walter Johnson (1925–2012), David Reed Johnson (1926–1976), Lois Marion Johnson (1927–1928), Lorraine Johnson Crosby (1928-2015), Marion Joan Johnson Reeves (1930–2010), and Paul Wesley Johnson (1932–1933). His father Russell died of lobar pneumonia and influenza on December 13, 1932, and his brother Paul also died of lobar pneumonia on January 5 the following year. His mother Minnie remarried after 10 years to Thomas S. Lewis (1886–1956).

As a teenager, Johnson attended Girard College, a private boarding school for fatherless boys, located in Philadelphia.

== Military career ==
After graduating from high school, Johnson enlisted in the United States Army Air Forces as an aviation cadet. On completing his training, he was commissioned as a second lieutenant. He flew 44 combat missions in the Pacific Theater during World War II as a bombardier in B-25 twin-engined medium bombers.

On March 4, 1945, while flying as a navigator in a B-25 with the 100th Bombardment Squadron, 42nd Bombardment Group, 13th Air Force, Johnson's B-25 and two others were shot down during a low-level bombing and strafing run against Japanese military targets in the Philippine Islands. The B-25s encountered heavy anti-aircraft fire, and all three had to ditch in the sea off Zamboanga. Johnson broke both his ankles in the landing, and his bomber's co-pilot was killed. Johnson received a Purple Heart for his injuries. He was also awarded the Air Medal, the Asiatic-Pacific Campaign Medal with three campaign stars, the Philippine Liberation Ribbon with one campaign star, and the World War II Victory Medal.

Johnson was honorably discharged as a first lieutenant on November 22, 1945, then joined the United States Air Force Reserve.

== Movie, television, and radio career ==
After his honorable discharge from the military, Johnson used the G.I. Bill to pay for his acting studies at the Actors' Lab in Hollywood.

Johnson became a close friend of Audie Murphy and later appeared with him in three of his films, Column South and Tumbleweed in 1953 and Ride Clear of Diablo in 1954. Johnson's Hollywood career began in 1952, with the college fraternity hazing exposé For Men Only, and with Loan Shark, also released in 1952 and starring George Raft.

His early roles were primarily in Westerns such as Rancho Notorious (1952, starring Marlene Dietrich), Seminole (1953), Law and Order (1953, opposite Ronald Reagan), and Badman's Country (1958), and science fiction films such as It Came from Outer Space (1953), This Island Earth (1955), Attack of the Crab Monsters (1956), and The Space Children (1958). He also appeared in a Ma and Pa Kettle vehicle, Ma and Pa Kettle at Waikiki (1955), as well as in Roger Corman's rock-'n'-roll crime drama Rock All Night (1957). In 1955, he had a role in Many Rivers to Cross along with Alan Hale Jr., later the Skipper from Gilligan's Island. Johnson and Hale also appeared together in an episode of the TV series Casey Jones, Season 1 Episode 20 "The Track Walker".

During the 1950s, he played the head of a gang of crooks in episode 17 of season one of The Adventures of Superman (originally broadcast in January 1953, filmed in 1951). Johnson was also cast on the religion anthology series Crossroads.

In 1957 he played a ruthless and heartless murdering outlaw named "Stanger" on the TV Western Gunsmoke in the episode "Bloody Hands" (S2E21), where he almost convinces Matt Dillon to quit from guilt because of his own constant need to kill. He returned to that series in 1959 as “Harry Webb” in the episode “The Bear”. He also played the Sundown Kid in an episode of the 1958 NBC's Western series Jefferson Drum and guest-starred in another NBC Western series, The Californians. He appeared in episodes of Wagon Train, "The Beauty Jamison Story" and "The Cliff Grundy Story".

He appeared four times on the first-run syndicated military drama The Silent Service, based on actual stories of the submarine section of the United States Navy. He was cast as Hugh Grafton in episode 28, "The Gar Story", as the executive officer Beach in the 1957 "Tirante Plays a Hunch", appeared twice as submarine officer and later author Edward L. Beach Jr., and as Tom Richards in two 1960 episodes, "Intermission" and "The Desperate Challenge", and twice with June Allyson on her CBS anthology series The DuPont Show with June Allyson. Also, he guest-starred with William Shatner in "The Hungry Glass", a 1961 episode of Thriller, and with Joan Evans and Harvey Stephens in "The Sky Diver", the unaired pilot episode of Ripcord of that same year. Then he was cast as John T. Metcalf in the 1962 episode "Mile-Long Shot to Kill" of the CBS anthology series GE True, hosted by Jack Webb. Also, in 1962, he was cast as Bob Murkland in the March 6 Season 3, episode 22 of Laramie, 'The Dynamiters'. In April of that same year, he was cast as Doctor Ross in the episode "Allergies Anonymous" of The Real McCoys. Also that year he played a role in Tales of Wells Fargo. Then in 1963, he was cast in the episode "Mutiny at Fort Mercy" of the short-lived ABC/Warner Bros.' Western series The Dakotas, and later he performed in the premiere of another short-lived ABC show, Breaking Point, a medical drama series starring Paul Richards and Eduard Franz.

From January 1959 to May 1960, Johnson co-starred as Marshal Gib Scott on the television series Black Saddle, which lasted two seasons—its first on NBC and its second on ABC.

=== Twilight Zone and Outer Limits episodes ===
Johnson appeared in two episodes of The Twilight Zone. His character brings a murderer from 1880 into the present via a time machine in the season-one episode "Execution". In the season-two episode "Back There", his character, Peter Corrigan, attempts to prevent the assassination of Abraham Lincoln. The plot of both episodes involved time travel from the 20th to the 19th centuries. Johnson also appeared on The Outer Limits in 1964, playing a crewmember on a United States space station in the episode "Specimen: Unknown".

=== "The Professor" on Gilligan's Island ===
Johnson was best known for playing Professor Roy Hinkley (usually called the "Professor"), the very knowledgeable polymath who could build all sorts of inventions out of the most rudimentary materials available on the island. As Johnson himself pointed out, though, he could not fix the hole in the boat. In the first episode of the show, the radio announcer describes the Professor as a research scientist and well-known Scoutmaster. Gilligan's Island aired from 1964 to 1967, but has been shown in reruns continuously ever since. Johnson reprised this character in three Gilligan's Island made-for-television movies: Rescue from Gilligan's Island (1978), The Castaways on Gilligan's Island (1979), and The Harlem Globetrotters on Gilligan's Island (1981), and two animated series: The New Adventures of Gilligan from 1974–77 and Gilligan's Planet from 1982–83. In a 2004 interview, Johnson commented about the role and shared his perspective regarding Gilligan's Island and the situation comedy's place in television history:

It used to make me upset to be typecast as the Professor...But as the years have gone by, I've given in. I am the Professor, and that's the way it is...Besides, the show went into syndication and parents are happy to have their children watch the reruns. No one gets hurt. There are no murders, no car crashes. Just good, plain, silly fun. It's brought a lot of joy to people, and that's not a bad legacy.

=== After Gilligan's Island ===
After Gilligan's Island, Johnson found himself somewhat typecast, making portraying more unsophisticated roles other than his signature role as the Professor more difficult. Nevertheless, he was able to resume a sufficient acting career, appearing in several other movies and television shows, especially the latter. He appeared as a guest star in several dramatic series, including The Big Valley with Peter Breck (marking a reunion of sorts, since they co-starred together in Black Saddle, an earlier Four Star Productions series), The Invaders, Death Valley Days, Owen Marshall: Counselor at Law, Lassie, That Girl, Ironside, The F.B.I, Mannix and Gunsmoke. He was cast in the miniseries Vanished, based on a novel by Fletcher Knebel (1971), the TV horror movie The Horror at 37,000 Feet (1973), uncredited in the Robert Redford spy thriller Three Days of the Condor (1975), the low-budget thriller Hitch Hike to Hell (1977), and appeared on the episode "Coffee, Tea or Cyanide" on McMillan and Wife in 1977, and on the NBC soap opera Santa Barbara.

Johnson had a brief appearance in MacArthur (1977), in which he played United States Navy Admiral Ernest J. King, and he appeared in the 1978 made-for-television movies The Ghost of Flight 401 and The Bastard. Russell provided the narration for the animated-short episodes of The Adventures of Stevie and Zoya that appeared on MTV during the mid-1980s.

In an interview with Starlog magazine in the early 1980s, Johnson said that he had wanted to appear in the original Star Trek during its run on NBC from 1966 to 1969, but he was never cast. An episode of CBS' Newhart in 1986 featured the Beavers (a men's organization) watching a Gilligan's Island episode on television. When they are suddenly evicted from the room, one of them, portrayed by Johnson, protests, "I want to see how it ends!" He is assured that the castaways do not get off the island. Johnson also played the sheriff in a season 9 episode of Dallas. His character in that series did not return in season 10, however, as season 9 turned out to be the infamous "dream season". In the late 1980s horror TV series Monsters, Johnson played an elder scientist in the episode Sleeping Dragon, in which he tries communicating with an ancient humanoid dinosaur that was awakened after a 65 million years-long slumber. His other appearances included a reprisal of his Gilligan's Island character in episodes of ALF and Meego, as well as appearances in The Jeffersons, Knots Landing and Roseanne.

Johnson entertained fans at the 1996 MST3K Conventio-Con-Expo-Fest-a-Rama 2: Electric Boogaloo on the "Celebrity Panel". Johnson was invited for his role in the movie-within-a-movie of Mystery Science Theater 3000: The Movie, This Island Earth, but spent most of the time answering questions about his Gilligan's Island days. He shared an amusing anecdote:

I was at a speaking engagement for MIT ... and I said ... the Professor has all sorts of degrees, including one from this very institution! And that's why I can make a radio out of a coconut, and not fix a hole in a boat!

— Russell Johnson

Johnson once participated in the Ig Nobel award presentation ceremony, credited as "The Professor Emeritus of Gilligan's Island".

Johnson had a number of guest roles in the radio series The Adventures of Harry Nile, one of the "Imagination Theater" series produced by Jim French.

== Personal life ==
Johnson was married three times. His first marriage, to Edith Cahoon in 1943, ended in divorce in 1948.

In 1949 he married his second wife, Kay Cousins, whom he had met while at the Actors' Lab in Hollywood. Together they had a daughter, Kim, and a son, David. Cousins died on January 20, 1980, in Century City, California.

In 1982, Johnson married Constance "Connie" Dane, and became stepfather to her son, Courtney Dane.

Johnson collaborated with writer Steve Cox on a memoir, Here on Gilligan's Isle, published in 1993.

Johnson's son David died of AIDS-related complications on October 27, 1994. After his son's diagnosis with AIDS, Johnson frequently helped raise money for AIDS charities.

== Death ==
Johnson died from kidney failure at his home in Bainbridge Island, Washington, on January 16, 2014, aged 89. Johnson's memorial service was held a month later.

== Filmography ==
Film
| Year | Title | Role | Notes |
|---|---|---|---|
| 1952 | For Men Only | Ky Walker | |
| 1952 | Rancho Notorious | Chuck-a-Luck Wheel Spinner | Uncredited |
| 1952 | Loan Shark | Charlie Thompson | |
| 1952 | Back at the Front | Johnny Redondo - Smuggler | |
| 1952 | The Turning Point | Herman | Uncredited |
| 1953 | Seminole | Lieutenant Hamilton | |
| 1953 | Adventures of Superman | Boss | S1, E17 "The Runaway Robot" |
| 1953 | Law and Order | Jimmy Johnson | |
| 1953 | Column South | Corporal Biddle | |
| 1953 | It Came from Outer Space | George | |
| 1953 | The Stand at Apache River | Greiner | |
| 1953 | Tumbleweed | Lam Blanden | |
| 1954 | Ride Clear of Diablo | Jed Ringer | |
| 1954 | Taza, Son of Cochise | Narrator | Voice, Uncredited |
| 1954 | Demetrius and the Gladiators | Gladiator | Uncredited |
| 1954 | Johnny Dark | Emory | |
| 1954 | Rogue Cop | Patrolman Carland | Uncredited |
| 1954 | Black Tuesday | Howard Sloane | |
| 1955 | Many Rivers to Cross | Banks Cherne | |
| 1955 | Strange Lady in Town | Shadduck | |
| 1955 | Ma and Pa Kettle at Waikiki | Eddie Nelson | |
| 1955 | This Island Earth | Dr. Steve Carlson | |
| 1957 | Alfred Hitchcock Presents | Turk | Season 2, Episode 29: "Vicious Circle" |
| 1957 | Gunsmoke | Joe Stanger | Season 5, Episode 46: "Bloody Hands" (radio series) |
| 1957 | Attack of the Crab Monsters | Hank Chapman | |
| 1957 | Rock All Night | Jigger | |
| 1957 | Courage of Black Beauty | Ben Farraday | |
| 1958 | Steve Canyon | Maj. Pitch Hammer | Season 1, Episode 4: "Project Heartbeat" |
| 1958 | The Space Children | Joe Gamble | |
| 1958 | Badman's Country | Sundance | |
| 1958 | Wagon Train | Steve | Season 2 Episode 11 |
| 1958 | The Saga of Hemp Brown | Hook | |
| 1960 | The Twilight Zone | Professor Manion | Season 1, Episode 26: "Execution" |
| 1961 | The Twilight Zone | Peter Corrigan | Season 2, Episode 13: "Back There" |
| 1961 | Death Valley Days | Noble | Season 9, Episode 22: "Dead Man's Tale" |
| 1962–63 | Death Valley Days | Sgt. Tate/Sgt. Teague | Season 11, Episode 9: "Davy's Friend", Episode 15: "Stubborn Mule Hill" |
| 1964 | A Distant Trumpet | Captain Brinker - Judge Advocate's office | |
| 1964 | Invitation to a Gunfighter | John Medford | Uncredited |
| 1964–67 | Gilligan's Island | The Professor | 1964-67 TV Series: Main role |
| 1965 | The Greatest Story Ever Told | Scribe | |
| 1967 | The Invaders | James Bernard | Season 2, Episode 6: "The Trial" |
| 1968 | Death Valley Days | Matthew Reynolds | Season 16, Episode 25: "The Pieces of the Puzzle" |
| 1969 | Cry for Poor Wally | Gaines | |
| 1969 | Gunsmoke | Diggs | Season 14, Episode 21: "The Long Night" |
| 1970 | That Girl | Jon (the pilot) | |
| 1972 | Gunsmoke | Link Parrin | Season 18, Episode 7: "The Fugitives" |
| 1974 | The Man from Independence | Linaver | |
| 1975 | Three Days of the Condor | Intelligence Officer at Briefing | Uncredited |
| 1977 | Hitch Hike to Hell | Captain J.W. Shaw | |
| 1977 | MacArthur | Admiral King | |
| 1978 | Wonder Woman | Colonel | Season 3, Episode 5: "Disco Devil" |
| 1980 | The Great Skycopter Rescue | Professor Benson | |
| 1982 | Kill Squad | | Voice, uncredited |
| 1983 | Off the Wall | Mr. Whitby | |
| 1986 | Dōwa Meita Senshi Windaria | Alan | 1987 English version; voice, uncredited |
| 1986 | MacGyver | Oslow | Season 1, Episode 18: "Ugly Duckling" |
| 1988 | Blue Movies | Mr. Martin | |
