= Execution (The Twilight Zone) =

- The Twilight Zone episode
- Episode no.: Season 1 Episode 26
- Directed by: David Orrick McDearmon
- Teleplay by: Rod Serling
- Based on: "Execution" by George Clayton Johnson
- Production code: 173-3628
- Original air date: April 1, 1960

Guest appearances
- Albert Salmi as Joe Caswell; Russell Johnson as Professor Manion; Than Wyenn as Paul Johnson; Jon Lormer as Reverend; George Mitchell as Elderly Man; Fay Roope as Judge; Richard Karlan as Bartender; Joe Haworth as TV Cowboy

Episode chronology
| ← Previous "People Are Alike All Over" | Next → "The Big Tall Wish" |
- The Twilight Zone (1959 TV series, season 1)

"Execution" is episode 26 of the American television anthology series The Twilight Zone. It features Albert Salmi, who also plays the lead character in the Season 4 episode "Of Late I Think of Cliffordville".

== Opening narration ==
Commonplace—if somewhat grim—unsocial event known as a necktie party, the guest of dishonor a cowboy named Joe Caswell, just a moment away from a rope, a short dance several feet off the ground, and then the dark eternity of all evil men. Mr. Joe Caswell, who, when the good Lord passed out a conscience, a heart, a feeling for fellow men, must have been out for a beer and missed out. Mr. Joe Caswell, in the last, quiet moment of a violent life.

== Plot ==
In 1867, an outlaw cowboy named Joe Caswell is about to be hanged for murder. But as the noose tightens around his neck, he suddenly disappears and finds himself in 1960, in the laboratory of Professor Manion. Manion explains that he used a time machine to pluck Caswell from the past. But when Manion sees the rope burns around Caswell's neck, and hears his admission that in his life he had murdered over twenty men, he knows he must try to send Caswell back.

The discussion leads to an argument. Caswell attacks Manion, killing him with a desk lamp. He then flees from the laboratory into a busy street, but is overwhelmed by the lights and the noise: He has manic reactions to a public phone booth, to jukebox and television set at a local bar, and he returns to the lab, distraught and desperate. He breaks down, pleading for the dead scientist to help him.

A thief named Paul Johnson enters the lab. Caswell fights with Johnson, but Johnson gets the upper hand and strangles Caswell with the cord from the window curtains. As Johnson tries to find Manion's safe, he accidentally activates the time machine and is sent back to 1880, appearing in the noose intended for Caswell, just in time to be hanged. The witnesses to the hanging are shocked to see a stranger's body, in strange clothes, in place of Caswell. They question whether this was the Devil's work or some other power's, and whether they have just executed an innocent man.

== Closing narration ==
This is November 1880, the aftermath of a necktie party. The victim's name—Paul Johnson, a minor-league criminal and the taker of another human life. No comment on his death save this: justice can span years. Retribution is not subject to a calendar. Tonight's case in point in The Twilight Zone.
