= Actors' Laboratory Theatre =

Hollywood leftist acting school (1941–1950)

The Actors' Laboratory Theatre was a politically active theatre company and acting school founded in January 1941 by Roman Bohnen, Jules Dassin, Dick Flake, Lloyd Bridges, Danny Mann, Jeff Corey, Mary Virginia Farmer and J. Edward Bromberg. During the Second World War, the Actors' Lab made multiple performances for servicemen, in association with the Hollywood Victory Committee.

The Actors' Lab was originally above Sharkey's Bar at the corner of Franklin and Bronson Avenues in Hollywood. In 1943, the theatre moved to 1455 North Laurel Avenue, Hollywood, California.

The Actors' Lab brought the ideas and acting techniques of New York's Group Theatre to California, and "prided itself on having opened its doors to students of all races." Hedda Hopper criticized the group for this opposition to racial segregation. The Actors' Lab was eventually denounced as a communist organization, and some of its existing members and former members, including Jules Dassin, Lloyd Bridges and Morris Carnovsky, were blacklisted.

Owing to the accusations of communism, the Actors' Lab lost its sources of financial support. Bohnen and other principals of the theater were called before a California Senate committee and declined to disclose if they were Communists. The U.S. Internal Revenue Service subsequently withdrew the group's tax exempt status, and the Veterans Administration cancelled its contracts with the group. Bohnen, considered the group's driving force in its final days, died of a heart attack during an Actors' Lab performance, and his death was partly attributed to the Lab's difficulties. The theatre was closed in February 1950.

== Notable members and students ==
- Roman Bohnen
- Phoebe Brand
- Morris Carnovsky
- Lee J. Cobb
- Jeff Corey
- Hume Cronyn
- Dorothy Dandridge
- Howard Da Silva
- Paul Lambert
- Marc Lawrence
- John Howard Lawson
- Bobby Lewis
- Russell Johnson
- Fay Kanin
- Aline MacMahon
- Marilyn Monroe
- Audie Murphy
- Ruth Nelson
- William Phipps (actor)
- Art Smith
- Mary Tarcai
- Herman Volz
- Frances E. Williams
