= John Lasell =

American film and television actor (1928–2024)

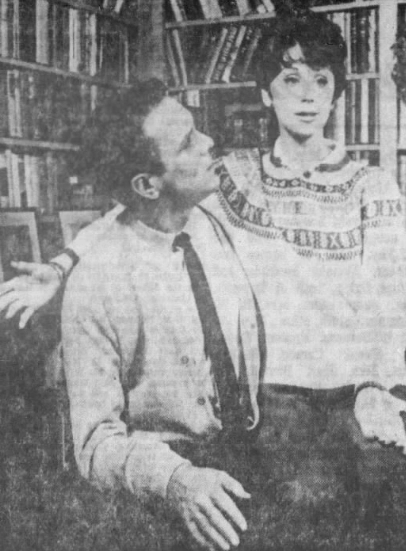
- Lasell (left) with Ellen Weston, 1962
- Born: John Whitin Lasell Jr. November 6, 1928; Williamstown, Vermont, U.S.
- Died: October 4, 2024 (aged 95); Los Angeles, California, U.S.
- Occupation: Actor
- Spouse: Patricia Smith

John Whitin Lasell Jr. (November 6, 1928 – October 4, 2024) was an American film and television actor. He was known for playing parapsychologist Dr. Peter Guthrie in the American soap opera television series Dark Shadows.

== Life and career ==
Lasell was born in Williamstown, Vermont, on November 6, 1928. He began his television career in 1960 in the anthology television series Armstrong Circle Theatre. In the same year he appeared in Hong Kong and Alcoa Presents: One Step Beyond. Lasell played John Wilkes Booth in the anthology television series The Twilight Zone in the episode "Back There". He played the recurring roles of Dr. Robbins in Lassie and Benjamin Wedlock in the drama television series Dan August, and made three appearances in the legal drama television series Perry Mason.

Lasell guest-starred in numerous television programs including Gunsmoke (S7E3 as outlaw Tucker Ferrin in the episode “Miss Kitty”), Wagon Train, Rawhide, Tales of Wells Fargo, 12 O'Clock High, The Fugitive, Adam-12, Mannix, Ben Casey, The Streets of San Francisco and Shotgun Slade. He appeared in five films. His final television credit was from the soap opera television series Falcon Crest.

Lasell died on October 4, 2024, at the age of 95.

== Filmography ==
Year	Title	Role	Notes
1969	Topaz	State Department Official #1	Uncredited
1970	Suppose They Gave a War and Nobody Came	Dr. Hillery	
1970	Helen Keller and Her Teacher	Capt. Keller	
1971	The Organization	Zach Mills	
1971	Honky	Archer Divine	
1972	Deathmaster	Sgt. Kelly	
