= Live with Kelly and Michael season 25 =

Yes	denotes that a particular segment WAS aired.
No	denotes that a particular segment WAS NOT aired.
- denotes a "Special Week" (usually a week in which the show is taken on location)
- denotes a "Special Episode"
- denotes a "Theme Week"

This is a list of Live! with Kelly and Live with Kelly and Michael episodes which were broadcast during the show's 25th season. The list is ordered by air date.

Although the co-hosts may have read a couple of emails during the broadcast, it does not necessarily count as an "Inbox" segment.

== Live! with Kelly ==
=== September 2012 ===
Date	Host	"Host Chat"	Guests/Segments	"Kelly's Inbox"
September 3	Kelly Ripa	Yes	Howie Mandel, Ana Gasteyer, Trisha Yearwood	No

== Live with Kelly and Michael ==
=== September 2012 ===
Date	Co-Hosts	"Host Chat"	Guests/Segments	"Kelly and Michael's Inbox"
September 4	Kelly Ripa & Michael Strahan	Yes	Claire Danes, Phillip Phillips, Challenge with the Champions - Jordyn Wieber & Aly Raisman	No
September 5	Kelly Ripa & Michael Strahan	Yes	Meredith Vieira, Demi Lovato, Challenge with the Champions - Amar'e Stoudemire	No
September 6	Kelly Ripa & Michael Strahan	Yes	Katie Couric, James Marsden, Challenge with the Champions - Carli Lloyd & Alex Morgan	No
September 7	Kelly Ripa & Michael Strahan	Yes	Melissa Etheridge, Kristin Chenoweth, Challenge with the Champions - Ryan Lochte	No
September 10	Kelly Ripa & Michael Strahan	Yes	Blake Shelton, Josh Radnor, Serena Williams, LIVE's Cutest Kid Search Week	Yes
September 11	Kelly Ripa & Michael Strahan	Yes	Matthew Perry, Olivia Wilde, Andy Murray, LIVE's Cutest Kid Search Week	Yes
September 12	Kelly Ripa & Michael Strahan	Yes	Jeremy Irons, Owl City, LIVE's Cutest Kid Search Week	Yes
September 13	Kelly Ripa & Michael Strahan	Yes	Emma Watson, LIVE's Cutest Kid Search Week	Yes
September 14	Kelly Ripa & Michael Strahan	Yes	Tyra Banks, Theresa Caputo, Obie the Dachshund, LIVE's Cutest Kid Search Week	Yes
September 17	Kelly Ripa & Michael Strahan	Yes	Lucy Liu, Penny Marshall, Nelly Furtado	No
September 18	Kelly Ripa & Michael Strahan	Yes	Kelsey Grammer, Mitt & Ann Romney	Yes
September 19	Kelly Ripa & Michael Strahan	Yes	Maya Rudolph, Elizabeth Olsen, Neon Trees	Yes
September 20	Kelly Ripa & Michael Strahan	Yes	Jake Gyllenhaal, Archie Panjabi, Austin Mahone	No
September 21	Kelly Ripa & Michael Strahan	Yes	Michael Chiklis, America Ferrera, Richie Sambora	Yes
September 24	Kelly Ripa & Michael Strahan	Yes	Maggie Gyllenhaal, Billy Gardell, Lawrence Zarian, Bow Wow Week	Yes
September 25	Kelly Ripa & Michael Strahan	Yes	Jimmy Fallon, NeNe Leakes, Bow Wow Week	No
September 26	Kelly Ripa & Michael Strahan	Yes	Ty Burrell, Terry O'Quinn, Bow Wow Week	No
September 27	Kelly Ripa & Michael Strahan	Yes	Sara Ramirez, Lana Parrilla, Bow Wow Week	No
September 28	Kelly Ripa & Michael Strahan	Yes	Julianna Margulies, Emily VanCamp, Bow Wow Week	No

=== October 2012 ===
Date	Co-Hosts	"Host Chat"	Guests/Segments	"Kelly and Michael's Inbox"
October 1	Kelly Ripa & Michael Strahan	Yes	Liam Neeson, Rachel Bilson, Diana Krall	Yes
October 2	Kelly Ripa & Michael Strahan	Yes	Tom Selleck, Mamie Gummer, Heart, Kelly's Birthday Surprise	No
October 3	Kelly Ripa & Michael Strahan	Yes	Stephen Colbert, Leighton Meester, Cher Lloyd, Behind the Scenes of Kelly's Birthday Surprise	Yes
October 4	Kelly Ripa & Michael Strahan	Yes	Samantha Giancola, Deena Cortese, Jenny Farley, Louise Strahan	No
October 5	Kelly Ripa & Michael Strahan	Yes	Chace Crawford, Mindy Kaling, Kelly visits David Blaine	No
October 8	Kelly Ripa & Michael Strahan	Yes	Ben Affleck, John Cena	No
October 9	Kelly Ripa & Michael Strahan	Yes	Christopher Walken, Connie Britton, Rick Springfield	No
October 10	Kelly Ripa & Michael Strahan	Yes	Kevin James, Kristin Kreuk, The Script	No
October 11	Kelly Ripa & Michael Strahan	Yes	Bryan Cranston, Stanley Tucci	Yes
October 12	Kelly Ripa & Michael Strahan	Yes	Salma Hayek Pinault, FamilyFun Toys of the Year	No
October 15	Kelly Ripa & Michael Strahan	Yes	Cynthia Nixon, Max Greenfield	Yes
October 16	Kelly Ripa & Michael Strahan	Yes	Ben Stiller, Gavin DeGraw, World's Largest Pumpkin	No
October 17	Kelly Ripa & Michael Strahan	Yes	Kaley Cuoco, Jason Aldean, Wife Carrying Champions Taisto Miettinen & Kristiina Haapenan	No
October 18	Kelly Ripa & Michael Strahan	Yes	Shaquille O'Neal, Isaac Mizrahi	No
October 19	Kelly Ripa & Michael Strahan	Yes	Michelle Obama, Brandy	Yes
October 22	Kelly Ripa & Michael Strahan	Yes	Elisha Cuthbert, Victoria Justice, Science Bob	Yes
October 23	Kelly Ripa & Michael Strahan	Yes	Gerard Butler, Krysten Ritter, Animals from San Diego Zoo	No
October 24	Kelly Ripa & Michael Strahan	Yes	Ted Danson, Jack McBrayer, Little Big Town	No
October 25	Kelly Ripa & Michael Strahan	Yes	Usher, Nicole "Snooki" Polizzi, Cher Lloyd	No
October 26	Kelly Ripa & Michael Strahan	Yes	Ellen Barkin, Adam Levine	Yes
October 29	Kelly Ripa & Michael Strahan	Yes	Don Cheadle, Jimmy Kimmel, Kids of LIVE Halloween Fashion Show	No
October 31	Kelly Ripa & Michael Strahan	Yes	Diane Sawyer, Caroline Rhea	No

=== November 2012 ===
Date	Co-Hosts	"Host Chat"	Guests/Segments	"Kelly and Michael's Inbox"
November 1	Kelly Ripa & Michael Strahan	Yes	Gary Sinise, Jennifer Carpenter	Yes
November 2	Kelly Ripa & Michael Strahan	Yes	Sarah Silverman, Judi Dench	Yes
November 5	Kelly Ripa & Michael Strahan	Yes	LIVE's Halloween Hurricane Telethon: Pauly D, Winner of LIVE's Annual Halloween Costume Contest	No
November 6	Kelly Ripa & Michael Strahan	Yes	Andre Braugher, Andy Grammer, Let's Get Physical Week - Gabby Douglas	No
November 7	Kelly Ripa & Michael Strahan	Yes	Kristen Stewart, Josh Peck, Let's Get Physical Week - Alicia Graf Mack	No
November 8	Kelly Ripa & Michael Strahan	Yes	Robert Pattinson, Let's Get Physical Week - Bellydance Superstars	No
November 9	Kelly Ripa & Michael Strahan	Yes	Taylor Lautner, Let's Get Physical Week - Brooklyn Nets Kids	No
November 12	Kelly Ripa & Michael Strahan	Yes	Robert De Niro, Isla Fisher, Connor Cruise, LIVE's Thanksgiving Family Recipe Week - Kelly	Yes
November 13	Kelly Ripa & Michael Strahan	Yes	Bradley Cooper, Jason Cameron, LIVE's Thanksgiving Family Recipe Week - Nicole Murphy	No
November 14	Kelly Ripa & Michael Strahan	Yes	Hayden Panettiere, Kellan Lutz, Behind the Scenes of Michael's Photo Shoot, LIVE's Thanksgiving Family Recipe Week - Michael	No
November 15	Kelly Ripa & Michael Strahan	Yes	Chris Tucker, Ashley Greene, Bridgit Mendler, LIVE's Thanksgiving Family Recipe Week - Gelman	No
November 16	Kelly Ripa & Michael Strahan	Yes	Zooey Deschanel, Jason Cameron & Tony Siragusa, LIVE's Thanksgiving Family Recipe Week - Camilla Consuelos	No
November 19	Kelly Ripa & Michael Strahan	Yes	Katie Holmes, Dave Salmoni, Healthy Holiday Eating - Dr. Wendy Bazillian	No
November 20	Kelly Ripa & Michael Strahan	Yes	Amy Poehler, Rico Rodriguez, Elaine Kramer	Yes
November 21	Kelly Ripa & Michael Strahan	Yes	Alec Baldwin, Nicki Minaj, Michael's Birthday Surprise	Yes
November 23	Kelly Ripa & Michael Strahan	Yes	Helen Mirren, Miranda Cosgrove, Animals from Mutual of Omaha's Wild Kingdom	No
November 26	Kelly Ripa & Michael Strahan	Yes	Jack Black, Carrot Top, LIVE's Holiday Gift Guide - Lori Bergamotto	No
November 27	Kelly Ripa & Michael Strahan	Yes	Helen Hunt, Bryan Adams, LIVE's Holiday Gift Guide - Carley Roney	No
November 28	Kelly Ripa & Michael Strahan	Yes	Dolly Parton, Kevin McKidd, LIVE's Holiday Gift Guide - Chris Byrne	No
November 29	Kelly Ripa & Michael Strahan	Yes	Patricia Heaton, Scott Speedman, LIVE's Holiday Gift Guide - Clint Carter	No
November 30	Kelly Ripa & Michael Strahan	Yes	Tracy Morgan, Rod Stewart, LIVE's Holiday Gift Guide - David Pogue	Yes

=== December 2012 ===
Date	Co-Hosts	"Host Chat"	Guests/Segments	"Kelly and Michael's Inbox"
December 3	Kelly Ripa & Michael Strahan	Yes	Neil Patrick Harris, Sir Ian McKellen, Holidays in New York Week - Jersey Boys sing Christmas Songs	No
December 4	Kelly Ripa & Michael Strahan	Yes	Jane Fonda, Gabby Douglas, Ed Sheeran, Holidays in New York Week - Holiday Tweets from the Audience	No
December 5	Kelly Ripa & Michael Strahan	Yes	Elijah Wood, Katherine Jenkins, Holidays in New York Week - Kelly visits The Nutcracker	No
December 6	Kelly Ripa & Michael Strahan	Yes	Laura Linney, Scott Baio, Holidays in New York Week - Michael's Broadway Debut in Elf	No
December 7	Kelly Ripa & Michael Strahan	Yes	Keira Knightley, Donnie Wahlberg, Holidays in New York Week - Michael and his Daughters Tour New York	No
December 10	Kelly Ripa & Michael Strahan	Yes	Hugh Jackman, Howie Mandel, LIVE's Holiday Hits Week - Richard Marx	No
December 11	Kelly Ripa & Michael Strahan	Yes	Mandy Patinkin, LIVE's Holiday Hits Week - Lifehouse	No
December 12	Kelly Ripa & Michael Strahan	Yes	Anne Hathaway, Alan Cumming, LIVE's Holiday Hits Week - Ashanti	Yes
December 13	Kelly Ripa & Michael Strahan	Yes	Don Johnson, Eddie Redmayne, LIVE's Holiday Hits Week - Colbie Caillat	No
December 14	Kelly Ripa & Michael Strahan	Yes	Ewan McGregor, Kerry Washington, LIVE's Holiday Hits Week - Jackie Evancho	No
December 17	Kelly Ripa & Michael Strahan	Yes	Paul Rudd, Christoph Waltz, LIVE's Countdown to Christmas - Lizzie Post	No
December 18	Kelly Ripa & Michael Strahan	Yes	Seth Rogen, LIVE's Countdown to Christmas - Lilla Crawford	Yes
December 19	Kelly Ripa & Michael Strahan	Yes	John Travolta & Olivia Newton-John, LIVE's Countdown to Christmas - Lance Ulanoff	No
December 20	Kelly Ripa & Michael Strahan	Yes	Samuel L. Jackson, Cassadee Pope, LIVE's Countdown to Christmas - Katie Brown	No
December 21	Kelly Ripa & Michael Strahan	Yes	Richard Gere, Disney on Ice: Rockin' Ever After, LIVE's Countdown to Christmas - Love Chef	Yes
December 24	Kelly Ripa & Michael Strahan	Yes	LIVE's Christmas Eve Special: Matt Damon, Aretha Franklin, Santa	No

=== January 2013 ===
Date	Co-Hosts	"Host Chat"	Guests/Segments	"Kelly and Michael's Inbox"
January 2	Kelly Ripa & Michael Strahan	Yes	Matthew Morrison, Whitney Cummings, Michael asks New Yorkers about New Year's Resolutions	Yes
January 7	Kelly Ripa & Michael Strahan	Yes	Betty White, Sean Lowe, Kick Start the New Year Week - Prevention Magazine	No
January 8	Kelly Ripa & Michael Strahan	Yes	Jessica Chastain, Busy Philipps, Kick Start the New Year Week - Farnoosh Torabi	No
January 9	Kelly Ripa & Michael Strahan	Yes	David Duchovny, Marlon Wayans, Kick Start the New Year Week - Dr. Melina Jampolis	No
January 10	Kelly Ripa & Michael Strahan	Yes	William H. Macy, Jenna Elfman, Kick Start the New Year Week - Kristen Brown	No
January 11	Kelly Ripa & Michael Strahan	Yes	Ginnifer Goodwin, Dr. Greg Yapalater, Kick Start the New Year Week - Carley Roney	No
January 14	Kelly Ripa & Michael Strahan	Yes	Chris Colfer, AnnaSophia Robb, Workout With Us Week - Michael	Yes
January 15	Kelly Ripa & Michael Strahan	Yes	Mark Wahlberg, Kim and Khloé Kardashian, Workout With Us Week - Fitness Apps	No
January 16	Kelly Ripa & Michael Strahan	Yes	Ryan Seacrest, Workout With Us Week - Kelly	Yes
January 17	Kelly Ripa & Michael Strahan	Yes	Catherine Zeta-Jones, Matt Bomer, Workout With Us Week - Presidential Fitness Test Challenge	No
January 18	Kelly Ripa & Michael Strahan	Yes	Kevin Bacon, Allison Williams, Workout With Us Week - Gelman	No
January 22	Kelly Ripa & Michael Strahan	Yes	Jeremy Renner, Taye Diggs	No
January 23	Kelly Ripa & Michael Strahan	Yes	Jason Statham, Christine Baranski, Olly Murs	No
January 24	Kelly Ripa & Michael Strahan	Yes	Jennifer Lawrence, Anthony Anderson	No
January 25	Kelly Ripa & Michael Strahan	Yes	Lena Dunham, Nicholas Hoult	Yes
January 28	Kelly Ripa & Michael Strahan	Yes	Dustin Hoffman, Linda Gray	Yes
January 29	Kelly Ripa & Michael Strahan	Yes	Melissa McCarthy, Stephen Amell	No
January 30	Kelly Ripa & Michael Strahan	Yes	Keri Russell, Chris Harrison	Yes
January 31	Kelly Ripa & Michael Strahan	Yes	Jason Bateman, Jonny Lee Miller	No

=== February 2013 ===
Date	Co-Hosts	"Host Chat"	Guests/Segments	"Kelly and Michael's Inbox"
February 1	Kelly Ripa & Michael Strahan	Yes	Sarah Jessica Parker, Kate Mara	Yes
February 4	Kelly Ripa & Michael Strahan	Yes	Russell Brand, Pauley Perrette, Super Bowl Retrospective with Michael	No
February 5	Kelly Ripa & Michael Strahan	Yes	Katharine McPhee, Leeza Gibbons, Announcement of Girl's Night Out: Oscar Edition Winners	No
February 6	Kelly Ripa & Michael Strahan	Yes	Eric Stonestreet, Reba, Ray Rice	Yes
February 7	Kelly Ripa & Michael Strahan	Yes	Rooney Mara, Josh Groban, Kelly's Recap of the Empire State Building Run-Up	Yes
February 8	Kelly Ripa & Michael Strahan	Yes	Jennifer Hudson, Madeline Stowe, Joe Flacco	Yes
February 11	Kelly Ripa & Michael Strahan	Yes	Emmy Rossum, Jane Lynch, Lori Bergamotto	No
February 12	Kelly Ripa & Michael Strahan	Yes	Viola Davis, Neon Trees, Chris Byrne	No
February 13	Kelly Ripa & Michael Strahan	Yes	Josh Duhamel, Anthony Edwards, Jillian Michaels	No
February 14	Kelly Ripa & Michael Strahan	Yes	Bruce Willis, Molly Shannon, Andrew Zimmern	No
February 15	Kelly Ripa & Michael Strahan	Yes	Heidi Klum, Snooki and JWoww, Quvenzhané Wallis	No
February 18	Kelly Ripa & Michael Strahan	Yes	LIVE! at Walt Disney World Resort: Jon Cryer, Kat Graham, Michael Tours Fantasyland with his Daughters, LIVE's Disney Family Face Off - Day 1	No
February 19	Kelly Ripa & Michael Strahan	Yes	LIVE! at Walt Disney World Resort: Howie Mandel, Gary Allan, Howie pranks Park Visitors, LIVE's Disney Family Face Off - Day 2	No
February 20	Kelly Ripa & Michael Strahan	Yes	LIVE! at Walt Disney World Resort: Johnny Galecki, Chris Wallace, Kelly rides the Test Track, LIVE's Disney Family Face Off - Day 3	No
February 21	Kelly Ripa & Michael Strahan	Yes	LIVE! at Walt Disney World Resort: Zach Braff, Ne-Yo, Michael has a Boy's Night Out, LIVE's Disney Family Face Off - Day 4	No
February 22	Kelly Ripa & Michael Strahan	Yes	LIVE's Pre-Oscar Celebration: Oscar Recap, Carley Roney, Girls of Girls' Night Out: Oscar Edition, Kelly looks for an Oscar Dress	No
February 25	Kelly Ripa & Michael Strahan	Yes	LIVE! with Kelly and Michael After Oscar Show: Jabbawockeez, Christoph Waltz, Jimmy Kimmel, Maria Menounos, Carson Kressley, Lawrence Zarian	No
February 26	Kelly Ripa & Michael Strahan	Yes	Scarlett Johansson, Megan Hilty, Girls' Night Out: Oscar Edition Recap	No
February 27	Kelly Ripa & Michael Strahan	Yes	Donald Trump, Taraji P. Henson	No
February 28	Kelly Ripa & Michael Strahan	Yes	Cheryl Hines, Dr. Ian Smith, OneRepublic	Yes

=== March 2013 ===
Date	Co-Hosts	"Host Chat"	Guests/Segments	"Kelly and Michael's Inbox"
March 1	Kelly Ripa & Michael Strahan	Yes	Mariah Carey, Maggie Q, Ryan Seacrest	No
March 4	Kelly Ripa & Michael Strahan	Yes	Matthew Fox, Zosia Mamet	Yes
March 5	Kelly Ripa & Michael Strahan	Yes	Tina Fey, Gillian Jacobs, Announcement of LIVE's Top Teacher Search	No
March 6	Kelly Ripa & Michael Strahan	Yes	James Franco, Tom Coughlin, Jennifer Love Hewitt	No
March 7	Kelly Ripa & Michael Strahan	Yes	Goran Visnjic, Peter Gros	Yes
March 8	Kelly Ripa & Michael Strahan	Yes	Nicole Richie, Jesse Metcalfe, Announcement of LIVE's Search for Unstoppable Moms Finalists	Yes
March 11	Kelly Ripa & Michael Strahan	Yes	Angela Bassett, Bridgit Mendler, LIVE's Search for Unstoppable Moms Finalists Week - Mary Lou King	No
March 12	Kelly Ripa & Michael Strahan	Yes	Josh Charles, Sean Lowe, LIVE's Search for Unstoppable Moms Finalists Week - Katie Broadus	No
March 13	Kelly Ripa & Michael Strahan	Yes	Ian Somerhalder, Abigail Breslin, LIVE's Search for Unstoppable Moms Finalists Week - Trelawney McCoy	Yes
March 14	Kelly Ripa & Michael Strahan	Yes	Josh Henderson, Jeff Probst, LIVE's Search for Unstoppable Moms Finalists Week - Andrea Cortes	No
March 15	Kelly Ripa & Michael Strahan	Yes	Ryan Reynolds, James Purefoy, LIVE's Search for Unstoppable Moms Finalists Week - Winner Announced	No
March 18	Kelly Ripa & Michael Strahan	Yes	Emma Stone, Timothy Olyphant	Yes
March 19	Kelly Ripa & Michael Strahan	Yes	Gerard Butler, Latest Prom Trends from Teen Vogue Magazine	Yes
March 25	Michael Strahan & Kristin Chenoweth	Yes	Usher, Paul Jolley, LIVE's Auto Show Week - Environmentally Green Cars	No
March 26	Michael Strahan & Kristin Chenoweth	Yes	Kim Kardashian, Dido, Clip from Family Weekend, LIVE's Auto Show Week - Sporty Cars	No
March 27	Michael Strahan & Vanessa Williams	Yes	Dwayne Johnson, Florida Georgia Line, Clip from Temptation, LIVE's Auto Show Week - Hatchbacks	No
March 28	Michael Strahan & Maria Menounos	Yes	Jeremy Piven, Blake Shelton, LIVE's Auto Show Week - Versatility Vehicles	No
March 29	Michael Strahan & Erin Andrews	Yes	Tyler Perry, Ed Sheeran, LIVE's Auto Show Week - Michael visits the Auto Show	No

=== April 2013 ===
Date	Co-Hosts	"Host Chat"	Guests/Segments	"Kelly and Michael's Inbox"
April 1	Michael Strahan & Robin Roberts	Yes	Laurence Fishburne, Stana Katic, Devin Velez	No
April 2	Kelly Ripa & Michael Strahan	Yes	Rosario Dawson, Andy Cohen, The Bacon Brothers	No
April 3	Kelly Ripa & Michael Strahan	Yes	Jeremy Irons, Jeremy Sisto, Juanes	No
April 4	Kelly Ripa & Michael Strahan	Yes	Shia LaBeouf, Rita Wilson, Lisa Vanderpump & Gleb Savchenko	Yes
April 5	Kelly Ripa & Michael Strahan	Yes	Chelsea Handler, Jane Levy	Yes
April 8	Kelly Ripa & Michael Strahan	Yes	John Cena, Eva Longoria, Jordana Brewster, Burnell Taylor	No
April 9	Kelly Ripa & Michael Strahan	Yes	Alexander Skarsgård, Jason O'Mara, Kenya Moore	No
April 10	Kelly Ripa & Michael Strahan	Yes	Joan Rivers, Ashley Tisdale	Yes
April 11	Kelly Ripa & Michael Strahan	Yes	Demi Lovato, Kurt Warner	No
April 12	Kelly Ripa & Michael Strahan	Yes	David Hyde Pierce, Josh Dallas, Avery Molek, Announcement of LIVE's Top Teacher Search Semi-Finalists	No
April 15	Kelly Ripa & Randy Jackson	Yes	Mark Wahlberg, Emilia Clarke, Lazaro Arbos	Yes
April 16	Kelly Ripa & Peter Facinelli	Yes	Alan Cumming, Caroline Kennedy, Clip from Nurse Jackie, Announcement of Top 5 Teachers in LIVE's Top Teacher Search	Yes
April 17	Kelly Ripa & Mark Feuerstein	Yes	Brad Garrett, Nick Lachey	No
April 18	Kelly Ripa & Carrie Ann Inaba	Yes	Zac Efron, The Jonas Brothers, Caring for Unusual Pets	No
April 19	Kelly Ripa & Carson Kressley	Yes	Susan Sarandon, Cher Lloyd, Performers from Totem	Yes
April 22	Kelly Ripa & Michael Strahan	Yes	Pierce Brosnan, Jake Johnson, Janelle Arthur	No
April 23	Kelly Ripa & Michael Strahan	Yes	Kate Hudson, Christina Hendricks, Roger Goodell	No
April 24	Kelly Ripa & Michael Strahan	Yes	Jon Hamm, Snoop Lion, AJ Clemente	No
April 25	Kelly Ripa & Michael Strahan	Yes	Laura Linney, Michael Bublé, Victor Ortiz & Lindsay Arnold, AJ Clemente at Love is All You Need	No
April 26	Kelly Ripa & Michael Strahan	Yes	Don Cheadle, Geraldo Rivera, Emeli Sandé, Announcement of Top Teacher Grand Prize	No
April 29	Kelly Ripa & Michael Strahan	Yes	Lauren Graham, Hugh Dancy, Top Teacher Week - Rick Zano	No
April 30	Kelly Ripa & Michael Strahan	Yes	Robert Downey, Jr., Carl Edwards, Top Teacher Week - Kathy Green	No

=== May 2013 ===
Date	Co-Hosts	"Host Chat"	Guests/Segments	"Kelly and Michael's Inbox"
May 1	Kelly Ripa & Michael Strahan	Yes	Jim Parsons, Carly Rae Jepsen, Top Teacher Week - Ann Marie Rooney	No
May 2	Kelly Ripa & Michael Strahan	Yes	Ben Kingsley, Andy Dick & Sharna Burgess, Top Teacher Week - Suzette Steward	No
May 3	Kelly Ripa & Michael Strahan	Yes	Isla Fisher, Chris O'Dowd, Top Teacher Week - Erin Palonen	No
May 6	Kelly Ripa & Michael Strahan	Yes	Kerry Washington, Psy, Amber Holcomb, New You in New York Makeover Week	No
May 7	Kelly Ripa & Michael Strahan	Yes	Zooey Deschanel, Zachary Quinto, Suzette Steward Announced as 2013 Top Teacher Winner, New You in New York Makeover Week	No
May 8	Kelly Ripa & Michael Strahan	Yes	Jessica Alba, Katie Couric, New You in New York Makeover Week	No
May 9	Kelly Ripa & Michael Strahan	Yes	Tobey Maguire, Sean Lowe & Peta Murgatroyd, Massage Envy Audience Giveaway, New You in New York Makeover Week	Yes
May 10	Kelly Ripa & Michael Strahan	Yes	Carey Mulligan, Rod Stewart, New You in New York Makeover Week	No
May 13	Kelly Ripa & Michael Strahan	Yes	Jimmy Kimmel, Alyson Hannigan, Kelly & Michael's Fitness Challenge Week - Animal Flow Workout with Mike Fitch	No
May 14	Kelly Ripa & Michael Strahan	Yes	Mark Harmon, Huey Lewis and the News, Kelly & Michael's Fitness Challenge Week - Baby Bootie Camp with Nikki Gor	No
May 15	Kelly Ripa & Michael Strahan	Yes	Jesse Tyler Ferguson, Kelly & Michael's Fitness Challenge Week - CrossFit Challenge with Megan May	Yes
May 16	Kelly Ripa & Michael Strahan	Yes	Zoe Saldaña, Ingo Rademacher & Kym Johnson, Kelly & Michael's Fitness Challenge Week - Super Bowl Bet Payoff Workout with Anna Kaiser	No
May 17	Kelly Ripa & Michael Strahan	Yes	Connie Britton, Michael visits Houston and receives his Honorary Doctorate, Kelly & Michael's Fitness Challenge Week - Acroyoga	No
May 20	Kelly Ripa & Michael Strahan	Yes	Colin Farrell, Elisabeth Moss, Winners Week - Candice Glover	No
May 21	Kelly Ripa & Michael Strahan	Yes	Psy, Kree Harrison, Winners Week - Trace Adkins	No
May 22	Kelly Ripa & Michael Strahan	Yes	Morgan Freeman, Angie Miller, Winners Week - Kellie Pickler & Derek Hough	Yes
May 23	Kelly Ripa & Carson Kressley	Yes	Ken Jeong, Zendaya & Val Chmerkovskiy, Winners Week - National Geographic Bee Winner	No
May 24	Kelly Ripa & Michael Strahan	Yes	Ethan Hawke, Jacoby Jones & Karina Smirnoff, Alexandra Raisman & Mark Ballas, LIVE's Truckin' Amazing Cook-Off, Winners Week - MathCounts Winner	No
May 27	Kelly Ripa & Michael Strahan	Yes	Heather Graham, Desiree Hartsock, Demi Lovato	No
May 28	Kelly Ripa & Michael Strahan	Yes	Tyler Perry, Oprah Winfrey, Trisha Yearwood	No
May 29	Kelly Ripa & Michael Strahan	Yes	Clive Owen, Khloé Kardashian Odom, Il Volo	Yes
May 30	Kelly Ripa & Michael Strahan	Yes	Anderson Davis, Steven Tyler, The Wanted	No
May 31	Kelly Ripa & Michael Strahan	Yes	Mark Ruffalo, Melissa Joan Hart, Jason Miller, LIVE's Truckin' Amazing Cook-Off	No

=== June 2013 ===
Date	Co-Hosts	"Host Chat"	Guests/Segments	"Kelly and Michael's Inbox"
June 3	Kelly Ripa & Michael Strahan	Yes	Alyssa Milano, Arvind Mahankali	Yes
June 4	Kelly Ripa & Michael Strahan	Yes	Neil Patrick Harris, Rose Byrne, Barenaked Ladies	Yes
June 5	Kelly Ripa & Michael Strahan	Yes	Vince Vaughn, Rick Schwartz and Animals from the San Diego Zoo	No
June 6	Kelly Ripa & Michael Strahan	Yes	Jeffrey Donovan, Beth Behrs	Yes
June 7	Kelly Ripa & Michael Strahan	Yes	Rebecca Romijn, LIVE's Truckin' Amazing Cook-Off	Yes
June 10	Kelly Ripa & Howie Mandel	Yes	Henry Cavill, Little Mix	Yes
June 11	Kelly Ripa & Andy Samberg	Yes	Seth Rogen, Judith Light	Yes
June 12	Kelly Ripa & Lucy Liu	Yes	Mark Feuerstein, Caroline Rhea, The Goo Goo Dolls	Yes
June 13	Kelly Ripa & Jerry Seinfeld	Yes	Kevin Costner, Leo Howard, Matchbox Twenty	No
June 14	Kelly Ripa & Mark Consuelos	Yes	Russell Crowe, Brad Keselowski, Avril Lavigne, LIVE's Truckin' Amazing Cook-Off	No
June 17	Kelly Ripa & Michael Strahan	Yes	Bret Michaels, LIVE's Truckin' Amazing Cook-Off	No
June 18	Kelly Ripa & Michael Strahan	Yes	Mark Cuban, Gabriel Mann	Yes
June 24	Michael Strahan & Carrie Ann Inaba	Yes	Melissa McCarthy, Armie Hammer	No
June 25	Michael Strahan & Carrie Ann Inaba	Yes	Channing Tatum, Eric McCormack	Yes
June 26	Michael Strahan & Kristin Chenoweth	Yes	Steve Carell, Miley Cyrus, The Backstreet Boys	No
June 27	Michael Strahan & Erin Andrews	Yes	Sandra Bullock, Ginny Blackmore	Yes
June 28	Michael Strahan & Erin Andrews	Yes	Jamie Foxx, Allison Janney, LIVE's Truckin' Amazing Cook-Off	No

=== July 2013 ===
Date	Co-Hosts	"Host Chat"	Guests/Segments	"Kelly and Michael's Inbox"
July 1	Kelly Ripa & Michael Strahan	Yes	Miranda Cosgrove, Aaron Tveit	Yes
July 2	Kelly Ripa & Michael Strahan	Yes	Mike Campbell, Nick Cannon, Sasha Alexander, Juicing with Dr. Wendy Bazillian	No
July 3	Kelly Ripa & Michael Strahan	Yes	Jane Lynch, Nicole Murphy	No
July 4	Kelly Ripa & Michael Strahan	Yes	Benjamin Bratt, Sig Hansen & Keith Colburn, Guy Fieri	No
July 5	Kelly Ripa & Michael Strahan	Yes	Liev Schreiber, Mary Murphy, LIVE's Truckin' Amazing Cook-Off	No
July 8	Kelly Ripa & Michael Strahan	Yes	Olivia Munn, Cory Booker, LIVE's Bow Wow Week: Puppy Edition	No
July 9	Kelly Ripa & Michael Strahan	Yes	David Spade, Bear Grylls, LIVE's Bow Wow Week: Puppy Edition	No
July 10	Kelly Ripa & Michael Strahan	Yes	Adam Sandler, Ciara, LIVE's Bow Wow Week: Puppy Edition	No
July 11	Kelly Ripa & Michael Strahan	Yes	Salma Hayek Pinault, LIVE's Bow Wow Week: Puppy Edition	Yes
July 12	Kelly Ripa & Michael Strahan	Yes	Kevin James, LIVE's Truckin' Amazing Cook-Off, LIVE's Bow Wow Week: Puppy Edition	No
July 15	Kelly Ripa & Michael Strahan	Yes	Helen Mirren, Howie Mandel, John Cena	No
July 16	Kelly Ripa & Michael Strahan	Yes	Mary-Louise Parker, Cody Simpson	No
July 17	Kelly Ripa & Michael Strahan	Yes	Josh Duhamel, Sara Bareilles	Yes
July 18	Kelly Ripa & Michael Strahan	Yes	Jeff Bridges, Marc Anthony, Shaquille O'Neal	Yes
July 19	Kelly Ripa & Michael Strahan	Yes	Ryan Reynolds, Ross Lynch, LIVE's Truckin' Amazing Cook-Off	No
July 22	Kelly Ripa & Michael Strahan	Yes	Octavia Spencer, Daniel Sunjata, LIVE on Broadway Week - Backstage at Pippin	Yes
July 23	Kelly Ripa & Michael Strahan	Yes	Heidi Klum, LIVE on Broadway Week - Motown: The Musical	Yes
July 24	Kelly Ripa & Michael Strahan	Yes	Hugh Jackman, LIVE on Broadway Week - Kelly performs with Broadway's Cinderella	No
July 25	Kelly Ripa & Michael Strahan	Yes	Stanley Tucci, LIVE on Broadway Week - Backstage at Kinky Boots	No
July 26	Kelly Ripa & Michael Strahan	Yes	Selena Gomez, LIVE's Truckin' Amazing Cook-Off, LIVE on Broadway Week - Matilda: The Musical	No
July 29	Kelly Ripa & Michael Strahan	Yes	Mark Wahlberg, Chloë Grace Moretz, LIVE's Truckin' Amazing Cook-Off Top 4 Finalists	Yes
July 30	Kelly Ripa & Michael Strahan	Yes	Denzel Washington, Hank Azaria, Robert Randolph & the Family Band	No
July 31	Kelly Ripa & Michael Strahan	Yes	Matt Damon, Jayma Mays, LIVE's Truckin' Amazing Cook-Off Top 2 Finalists	Yes

=== August 2013 ===
Date	Co-Hosts	"Host Chat"	Guests/Segments	"Kelly and Michael's Inbox"
August 1	Kelly Ripa & Michael Strahan	Yes	Bryan Cranston, Poppy Montgomery, Passenger	No
August 2	Kelly Ripa & Michael Strahan	Yes	Sharon Stone, Matthew Morrison, LIVE's Truckin' Amazing Cook-Off Top 2 Finalists Compete	No
August 5	Michael Strahan & Robin Roberts	Yes	Liam Hemsworth, Jason Sudeikis	Yes
August 6	Michael Strahan & Erin Andrews	Yes	Oprah Winfrey, Desiree Hartsock	No
August 7	Michael Strahan & Erin Andrews	Yes	Amanda Seyfried, Chris Colfer	No
August 8	Michael Strahan & Nicole Richie	Yes	Lenny Kravitz, Emma Roberts	Yes
August 9	Michael Strahan & Nicole Richie	Yes	Ashton Kutcher, Brett Eldredge	Yes
August 12	Michael Strahan & Rebecca Romijn	Yes	Jeff Daniels, Jennifer Coolidge	No
August 13	Michael Strahan & Rebecca Romijn	Yes	Jason Dufner, Joe Manganiello, Keri Russell, Carrie Underwood	No
August 14	Michael Strahan & Maria Menounos	Yes	Forest Whitaker, Cast of Duck Dynasty	No
August 15	Michael Strahan & Maria Menounos	Yes	Harrison Ford, Cooking with Maria	Yes
August 16	Michael Strahan & Whitney Cummings	Yes	Cuba Gooding, Jr., Lucy Danziger	Yes
