= American Idols Live! Tour 2013 =

2013 summer concert tour

- Tour by American Idol
- Back – Paul Jolley, Candice Glover, Curtis Finch, Jr. Middle – Devin Velez, Aubrey Cleland, Kree Harrison, Lazaro Arbos; Front – Angie Miller, Janelle Arthur, Burnell Taylor, Amber Holcomb
- Start date: July 19, 2013
- End date: August 31, 2013
- No. of shows: 30
- Box office: $1,278,628 (9 shows)

American Idol concert chronology
- American Idols Live! Tour 2012 (2012); American Idols Live! Tour 2013 (2013); American Idols Live! Tour 2014 (2014)

The American Idols Live! Tour 2013 was a summer concert tour in the United States and Canada featuring the Top 10 contestants from the twelfth season of American Idol. The tour also included Top 20 contestant Aubrey Cleland, who won the season's sing-off. This was the second time, after the 2011 tour, that the tour featured 11 performers.

The tour was originally scheduled to begin on June 29, 2013, in St. Louis, Missouri, and end on August 31, 2013, in Nashville, Tennessee. However, due to low ticket sales, 10 shows were canceled, reducing the total to 30 performances. The tour began on July 19, 2013, in Kent, Washington.

At most venues, the stage was placed in the center of the arena, with the other half closed off by curtains to create a theater-like atmosphere. This setup provided a more intimate experience for audiences.

== Performers ==
Candice Glover (Winner)	Kree Harrison (Runner-up)
Angie Miller (3rd place)	Amber Holcomb (4th place)
Janelle Arthur (5th place)	Lazaro Arbos (6th place)
Burnell Taylor (7th place)	Devin Velez (8th place)
Paul Jolley (9th place)	Curtis Finch Jr. (10th place)
Aubrey Cleland (Sing-off winner)

== Setlist ==
1. Girls – "Wings" (Little Mix)
2. Aubrey Cleland – "Sweet Dreams" (Beyoncé)
3. Burnell Taylor, Devin Velez, Curtis Finch, Jr. – "Suit & Tie" (Justin Timberlake)
4. Paul Jolley – "Blown Away" (Carrie Underwood)
5. Kree Harrison, Janelle Arthur, and Jolley – "Summer Nights" (Rascal Flatts)
6. Finch – "When I Was Your Man" (Bruno Mars)
7. Amber Holcomb – "We Found Love" (Rihanna)
8. Holcomb, Cleland, and Angie Miller – "The Way" (Ariana Grande)
9. Guys – "Locked Out of Heaven" (Bruno Mars)
10. Velez – "Somos Novios (It's Impossible)" (Perry Como)
11. Miller, Holcomb, Arthur, and Cleland – "Blurred Lines" (Robin Thicke)
12. Taylor and Holcomb – "Diamonds" (Rihanna)
13. Taylor – "Everybody Knows" (John Legend)
14. All – "We Are Young" (Fun)
15. All – "Live While We're Young" (One Direction)

Intermission

16. Angie Miller – "Mamma Knows Best" (Jessie J)
17. Miller – "You Set Me Free" (Angie Miller)
18. Miller – "Put It on Me" (Angie Miller)
19. Arthur – "Better Dig Two" (The Band Perry), "Where the Blacktop Ends" (Keith Urban)
20. Lazaro Arbos – "Feeling Good" (Nina Simone), "The Edge of Glory" (Lady Gaga)
21. Harrison – "Up to the Mountain (MLK Song)" (Patty Griffin), "Hold On" (Alabama Shakes), "All Cried Out" (Kree Harrison)
22. Candice Glover – "End of Time" (Beyoncé)
23. Glover – "I Am Beautiful" (Candice Glover),
24. Glover – "In the Middle" (Candice Glover)
25. Glover – "Lovesong" (The Cure)
26. All – "Gone" ('N Sync)
27. All – "Since U Been Gone" (Kelly Clarkson)
28. All – "Cups" (Anna Kendrick)
29. All – "Gone, Gone, Gone" (Phillip Phillips)

== Tour dates ==
Date	City	Country	Venue	Tickets Sold / Available	Gross Revenue
July 19, 2013	Kent (Note: Labelled as Seattle in promotional material.)	United States	ShoWare Center	—N/a	—N/a
July 20, 2013	Portland	United States	Theater of the Clouds	—N/a	—N/a
July 22, 2013	Sacramento	United States	Sleep Train Arena	—N/a	—N/a
July 23, 2013	Los Angeles	United States	Nokia Theatre L.A. Live	6,475 / 6,882	$188,544
July 24, 2013	Phoenix	United States	Comerica Theatre	—N/a	—N/a
July 27, 2013	Grand Prairie (Note: Labelled as Dallas in promotional material.)	United States	Verizon Theatre at Grand Prairie	2,425 / 4,275	$145,688
July 28, 2013	Houston	United States	Reliant Arena	—N/a	—N/a
July 30, 2013	New Orleans	United States	UNO Lakefront Arena	—N/a	—N/a
August 1, 2013	Orlando	United States	Amway Center	2,827 / 6,281	$153,821
August 2, 2013	Miami	United States	American Airlines Arena	—N/a	—N/a
August 4, 2013	Duluth (Note: Labelled as Atlanta in promotional material.)	United States	Arena at Gwinnett Center	—N/a	—N/a
August 5, 2013	North Charleston	United States	North Charleston Coliseum	—N/a	—N/a
August 6, 2013	Knoxville	United States	Thompson–Boling Arena	—N/a	—N/a
August 8, 2013	Charlotte	United States	Time Warner Cable Arena	—N/a	—N/a
August 9, 2013	Fairfax (Note: Labelled as Washington, D.C. in promotional material.)	United States	Patriot Center	2,601 / 3,427	$132,928
August 12, 2013	Rosemont (Note: Labelled as Chicago in promotional material.)	United States	Allstate Arena	—N/a	—N/a
August 14, 2013	Newark (Note: Labelled as New York City in promotional material.)	United States	Prudential Center	2,653 / 7,251	$144,363
August 15, 2013	Uniondale (Note: Labelled as Long Island in promotional material.)	United States	Nassau Veterans Memorial Coliseum	2,893 / 7,138	$149,338
August 16, 2013	Atlantic City	United States	Etess Arena	—N/a	—N/a
August 17, 2013	Uncasville	United States	Mohegan Sun Arena	—N/a	—N/a
August 19, 2013	Boston	United States	Agganis Arena	2,545 / 3,035	$142,612
August 20, 2013	Manchester	United States	Verizon Wireless Arena	—N/a	—N/a
August 21, 2013	Providence	United States	Dunkin' Donuts Center	—N/a	—N/a
August 23, 2013	Bridgeport	United States	Webster Bank Arena	—N/a	—N/a
August 24, 2013	Reading	United States	Sovereign Center	—N/a	—N/a
August 25, 2013	Youngstown	United States	Covelli Centre	—N/a	—N/a
August 27, 2013	Toronto	Canada	Air Canada Centre	—N/a	—N/a
August 29, 2013	Columbus	United States	Schottenstein Center	—N/a	—N/a
August 30, 2013	Louisville	United States	KFC Yum! Center	2,129 / 6,648	$83,579
August 31, 2013	Nashville	United States	Music City Theater	2,469 / 3,176	$137,755
Total				27,017 / 48,113 (56%)	$1,278,628

== Cancelled & Rescheduled Shows ==
Cancelled

- St. Louis, Missouri on June 29
- Kansas City, Missouri on June 30
- Minneapolis, Minnesota on July 2
- Detroit, Michigan on July 5
- Tulsa, Oklahoma, on July 8
- Broomfield, Colorado on July 10
- Las Vegas, Nevada on July 12
- Ontario, California on July 13
- Oakland, California on July 14
- Trenton, New Jersey on August 12

Rescheduled

- Rosemont, Illinois moved from July 6 to August 12 (which replaces Trenton, New Jersey)

== Revenue ==
The tour was ranked No. 186 on the 2013 Year-End Top 200 North American Tours list, based on total gross income.
