= All Cried Out =

All Cried Out may refer to:

- "All Cried Out" (Alison Moyet song), notably covered by No Angels
- "All Cried Out" (Blonde song)
- "All Cried Out" (Kree Harrison song)
- "All Cried Out" (Lisa Lisa and Cult Jam song), notably covered by Allure
- "All Cried Out", song by Dusty Springfield
- "All Cried Out", song by Gary Benson
- "All Cried Out", song by Lamont Dozier
- "All Cried Out", song by Lena Martell
- "All Cried Out", song by Margie Joseph
