= Amber Holcomb =

American singer (born 1994)

- Born: Amber Nicole Holcomb; March 17, 1994 (age 32); Houston, Texas, United States
- Origin: Shepherd, Texas
- Genres: R&B
- Occupation: Singer
- Instrument: Voice
- Years active: 2013–present

Amber Nicole Holcomb (born March 17, 1994) is an American singer, who came in fourth place on the twelfth season of American Idol.

== Early life ==
Amber Nicole Holcomb was born on March 17, 1994, in Houston, Texas. Holcomb starting singing at the age of two in her church. She graduated from Dekaney High School in 2012.

== American Idol ==
=== Overview ===
Holcomb previously auditioned for American Idol in the eleventh season, but was cut in the Las Vegas round, where she was grouped with Curtis Finch Jr., Shannon Magrane and Joshua Ledet.

She performed "My Funny Valentine" in Vegas sudden death rounds which received standing ovation from the judges. Holcomb performed "I Believe in You and Me" at the semi-final voting round receiving standing ovation from all of the judges. In the semi-finals of the twelfth season, Holcomb performed "My Funny Valentine" by Lorenz Hart and "Just Give Me a Reason" by Pink. She was then eliminated on May 2, 2013, coming in fourth place. She performed "I Believe in You and Me" as her goodbye song.

=== Performances and results ===
Episode	Theme	Song choice	Original artist	Order #	Result
Audition	Auditioner's Choice	Not aired		N/A	Advanced
Hollywood Round, Part 1	A Capella	Not aired		N/A	Advanced
Hollywood Round, Part 2	Group Performance	"Knock on Wood"	Eddie Floyd	N/A	Advanced
Hollywood Round, Part 3	Solo	Not aired		N/A	Advanced
Las Vegas Round	Personal Choice	"My Funny Valentine"	Mitzi Green	10	Advanced
Top 20 (10 Women)	Personal Choice	"I Believe in You and Me"	Whitney Houston	7	Advanced
Top 10 Reveal	Victory Song	"I'm Every Woman"	Chaka Khan	9	N/A
Top 10	Music of the American Idols	"A Moment Like This"	Kelly Clarkson	10	5th
Top 9	The Beatles	"She's Leaving Home"	The Beatles	3	Bottom 3^{1}
Top 8	Music of Motor City	Trio "I'm Gonna Make You Love Me" with Candice Glover and Angie Miller	Dee Dee Warwick	6	Safe
Top 8	Music of Motor City	Solo "Lately"	Stevie Wonder	9	Safe
Top 7	Rock	Trio "It's Still Rock and Roll to Me" with Janelle Arthur and Kree Harrison	Billy Joel	7	Safe
Top 7	Rock	Solo "What About Love"	Heart	9	Safe
Top 6	Burt Bacharach and Hal David	"I Say a Little Prayer"	Dionne Warwick	2	Bottom 2^{2}
Top 6	Songs They Wish They'd Written	"Love on Top"	Beyoncé	8	Bottom 2^{2}
Top 5	Year They Were Born	"Without You"	Badfinger	5	Safe
Top 5	Divas	"What Are You Doing the Rest of Your Life?"	Michael Dees	10	Safe
Top 4	Contestant's Choice	Solo "The Power of Love"	Jennifer Rush	1	Bottom 2^{3}
Top 4	Contestant's Choice	Duet "Rumour Has It" with Kree Harrison	Adele	5	Bottom 2^{3}
Top 4	One-Hit Wonders	"MacArthur Park"	Richard Harris	7	Bottom 2^{3}
Top 4^{4}	Songs from Now and Then	"Just Give Me a Reason"	Pink feat. Nate Ruess	2	Eliminated
Top 4^{4}	Songs from Now and Then	"My Funny Valentine"	Mitzi Green	6	Eliminated
Top 4^{4}	Songs from Now and Then	Quartet "Wings" with Candice Glover, Kree Harrison, and Angie Miller	Little Mix	9	Eliminated

- ^Note 1 When Ryan Seacrest announced the results for this particular night, Holcomb was among the bottom three contestants, but was declared safe when Paul Jolley was eliminated.
- ^Note 2 When Ryan Seacrest announced the results for this particular night, Holcomb was in the bottom two, but was declared safe when Lazaro Arbos was eliminated.
- ^Note 3 When Ryan Seacrest announced the results for this particular night, Holcomb was in the bottom two with Candice Glover, but was declared safe as no one was eliminated.
- ^Note 4 Due to the surprise non-elimination at the top 4, the top 4 remained intact for another week.

== Post-Idol ==
Amber Holcomb took part in the American Idols LIVE! Tour 2013 from July 19 through August 31, 2013. On August 4, 2013, news surfaced that Holcomb and her boyfriend, Lamar Denson, are expecting their first child. On February 14, 2014, Holcomb gave birth to a baby girl.

On April 7, 2016, Holcomb and Ruben Studdard sang "Here, There and Everywhere" on fifteenth season finale of American Idol.

== Personal life ==
On February 14, 2014, Holcomb gave birth to a baby girl. Her boyfriend, Lamar D. Denson, is reportedly the father of the baby.
