= Kree Harrison =

American singer & musician (born 1990)

- Born: Kree Annette Harrison; May 17, 1990 (age 35); Port Arthur, Texas, U.S.
- Genres: Country; blues; folk; soul
- Occupations: Singer; songwriter
- Instruments: Vocals; guitar; drums
- Years active: 2000–present
- Label: One Vision Music Group

Kree Annette Harrison (born May 17, 1990) is an American singer and musician, who was the runner-up on the twelfth season of American Idol.

== Early life ==
Kree Annette Harrison was born on May 17, 1990 at St. Mary's Hospital in Port Arthur, Texas. The family moved to Woodville, Texas in a home that was given to them by their grandmother. At three, Harrison asked her pastor if she could sing during church. The request was accepted and after she sang, her pastor commented, "I was expecting Jesus Loves Me, but she belted out El Shaddai by Amy Grant. I knew then this child had a special gift." Over the next several years, Harrison sang for churches, rodeos, weddings and competitions. At eight, she was the opening act for R&B performer Percy Sledge. At nine, she won "Artist of the Year" from Kirbyville Playhouse, and at ten, she sang on The Rosie O'Donnell Show and was invited back on three other occasions. She sang in country playhouses all over the area, as a special guest at a Warren Talent Show, and she was second-place winner in the New York Apollo competition held in Houston. On October 11, 2001, Harrison's father died after the plane he was on crashed off the coast of Spain. After sixth grade, her family moved to Nashville to pursue her singing career. She attended seventh grade there, and was home schooled afterwards to devote more time to her music. On September 22, 2009, Harrison's mother was killed in a head-on traffic collision.

Harrison scored a development deal with Lyric Street Records at ten, which resulted in her family moving from Woodville to Nashville. The deal ended two years later without any recordings released due in part to some creative differences.

Harrison began writing her own songs at the age of fourteen and often found herself in writing sessions with songwriters such as Trey Bruce and artist Rebecca Lynn Howard. She performed across local venues in Nashville such as the Bluebird Cafe. Harrison signed a publishing deal with Chrysalis Records at sixteen. She was working on an album when her mother died. She would later meet with an executive travel and event coordinator at Broadcast Music, Inc. (BMI), and made affiliations with the company. She would go on to perform at BMI showcases in Florida, such as the Key West Songwriters Festival and the San Destin Music Festival. She also sang backup vocals on Kacey Musgraves' album, Same Trailer Different Park, and Eli Young Band's album Life at Best.

Harrison was friends with country singer Mindy McCready. McCready invited Harrison up to sing her song "Guys Do It All the Time" with her at a 2011 Country Music Association performance in Nashville.

== American Idol ==
Harrison auditioned in Oklahoma City and performed an original song that she wrote to her mother.

After Harrison sang "Stars" by Grace Potter and the Nocturnals on Hollywood week, judge Keith Urban commented,

"Your voice is one of my favorites in the entire competition. You have something amazing in your voice, literally my arms get covered in chills when you hit certain notes."

In the semi-finals, Harrison performed "Up to the Mountain (MLK Song)" by Patty Griffin where she received standing ovation from judges Nicki Minaj and Keith Urban, and Randy Jackson called her a "natural born singer". On March 7, 2013, Harrison was voted into the Top 10. Her performance of "Crying" by Roy Orbison earned her enough votes to establish her as one of the night's top three contestants, along with Candice Glover and Angie Miller. Harrison once again landed in the night's top three contestants after she performed "Piece of My Heart" by Erma Franklin, along with Lazaro Arbos and Angie Miller. After her Top 6 performance, Harrison earned enough votes to land in the night's top two contestants, along with Candice Glover. In the Top 3, her performance of "Here Comes Goodbye" by Rascal Flatts which was dedicated to her late parents left both the judges and audience in tears. She became the runner-up on May 16, 2013.

American Idol season 12 performances and results
Episode	Theme	Song choice	Original artist	Order #	Result
Audition	Auditioner's Choice	Not aired		N/A	Advanced
Hollywood Round, Part 1	First Solo	Not aired		N/A	Advanced
Hollywood Round, Part 2	Group Performance	"Sin Wagon" with Brandy Neelly, Haley Davis and Britnee Kellogg	Dixie Chicks	N/A	Advanced
Hollywood Round, Part 3	Solo	"Stars"	Grace Potter and the Nocturnals	N/A	Advanced
Las Vegas Round	Personal Choice	"Up to the Mountain (MLK Song)"	Patty Griffin	7	Advanced
Top 20 (10 Women)	Personal Choice	"Stronger"	Faith Hill	8	Advanced
Top 10 Reveal	Victory Song	"Evidence"	Candi Staton	10	N/A
Top 10	Music of the American Idols	"Crying"	Roy Orbison	8	Top three
Top 9	The Beatles	"With a Little Help from My Friends"	The Beatles	1	Safe
Top 8	Music of Motor City	Duet "Like a Prayer" with Janelle Arthur	Madonna	2	Safe
Top 8	Music of Motor City	Solo "Don't Play That Song (You Lied)"	Ben E. King	11	Safe
Top 7	Rock	Solo "Piece of My Heart"	Erma Franklin	3	Top three
Top 7	Rock	Trio "It's Still Rock and Roll to Me" with Janelle Arthur and Amber Holcomb	Billy Joel	7	Top three
Top 6	Burt Bacharach and Hal David	"What the World Needs Now Is Love"	Jackie DeShannon	4	Top two
Top 6	Songs They Wish They'd Written	"Help Me Make It Through the Night"	Kris Kristofferson	10	Top two
Top 5	Year they Were Born	"She Talks to Angels"	The Black Crowes	3	Bottom 2^{1}
Top 5	Divas	"Have You Ever Been in Love"	Celine Dion	8	Bottom 2^{1}
Top 4	Contestant's Choice	Solo "It Hurt So Bad"	Susan Tedeschi	3	Safe
Top 4	Contestant's Choice	Duet "Rumour Has It" with Amber Holcomb	Adele	5	Safe
Top 4	One-Hit Wonders	"A Whiter Shade of Pale"	Procol Harum	9	Safe
Top 4^{2}	Songs from Now and Then	"See You Again"	Carrie Underwood	4	Safe
Top 4^{2}	Songs from Now and Then	"Stormy Weather"	Ethel Waters	8	Safe
Top 4^{2}	Songs from Now and Then	Quartet "Wings" with Candice Glover, Amber Holcomb, and Angie Miller	Little Mix	9	Safe
Top 3	Jimmy Iovine's Choice	"Fuckin' Perfect"	Pink	1	Safe
Top 3	Judges' Choice	"Here Comes Goodbye"	Rascal Flatts	6	Safe
Top 3	Producer	"Better Dig Two"	The Band Perry	8	Safe
Finale	Simon Fuller's Choice	"Angel"	Sarah McLachlan	1	Runner-up
Finale	Winner's Single	"All Cried Out"	Kree Harrison	3	Runner-up
Finale	Favorite Performance	"Up to the Mountain (MLK Song)"	Patty Griffin	5	Runner-up

- ^Note 1 When Ryan Seacrest announced the results for this particular night, Harrison was in the bottom 2, but declared safe as Janelle Arthur was eliminated.
- ^Note 2 Due to the surprise non-elimination at the top 4, the top 4 remained intact for another week.
- ^Note 3 When Ryan Seacrest announced the results for this particular night, Harrison was in the bottom 2, but declared safe as Amber Holcomb was eliminated.

== Post-Idol career ==
Harrison took part in the American Idols LIVE! Tour 2013, from July 19 through August 31, 2013. In July 2013, it was announced that Harrison had not been picked up by the Universal Music Group Nashville. On May 6, 2014, Harrison premiered a new song called "Strong and Silent," which she co-wrote with Fancy Hagood and Kate York.

She performed on the fifteenth season finale of American Idol on April 7, 2016. The second single, "Dead Man's House," was released in May 2016, and her debut album, This Old Thing, was released on July 8, 2016.

Harrison parted ways with Plaid Flag in early 2018, signing a new record deal with One Vision Music Group. Harrison released a new single "I Love the Lie" in March 2019. "Get Away with Anything" was released in October 2019, and Harrison's second studio album, Chosen Family Tree, was announced for a January 2020 release, but it was later pushed back to a release date of June 12, 2020, although it was pushed back again to August 21, 2020.

== Discography ==
=== Studio albums ===
Title	Album details	Peak chart positions	
Title	Album details	US Country	US Heat
This Old Thing	Released: July 8, 2016; Label: Plaid Flag Records; Format: CD, digital download	28	20
Chosen Family Tree	Released: August 21, 2020; Label: One Vision Music Group; Format: CD, digital download	—	—

=== Singles ===
Year	Title	Peak positions	Album
Year	Title	US Country	Album
2013	"All Cried Out"	34	—N/a
2016	"This Old Thing"	—	This Old Thing
2016	"Dead Man's House"	—	This Old Thing
2019	"I Love the Lie"	—	Chosen Family Tree
2019	"Get Away with Anything"	—	Chosen Family Tree

=== Music videos ===
Year	Video	Director
2016	"This Old Thing"	Jonathan Pears
2019	"I Love the Lie"	Slater Goodson and Alex Berger
