= Candice Glover =

American singer & actress (born 1989)

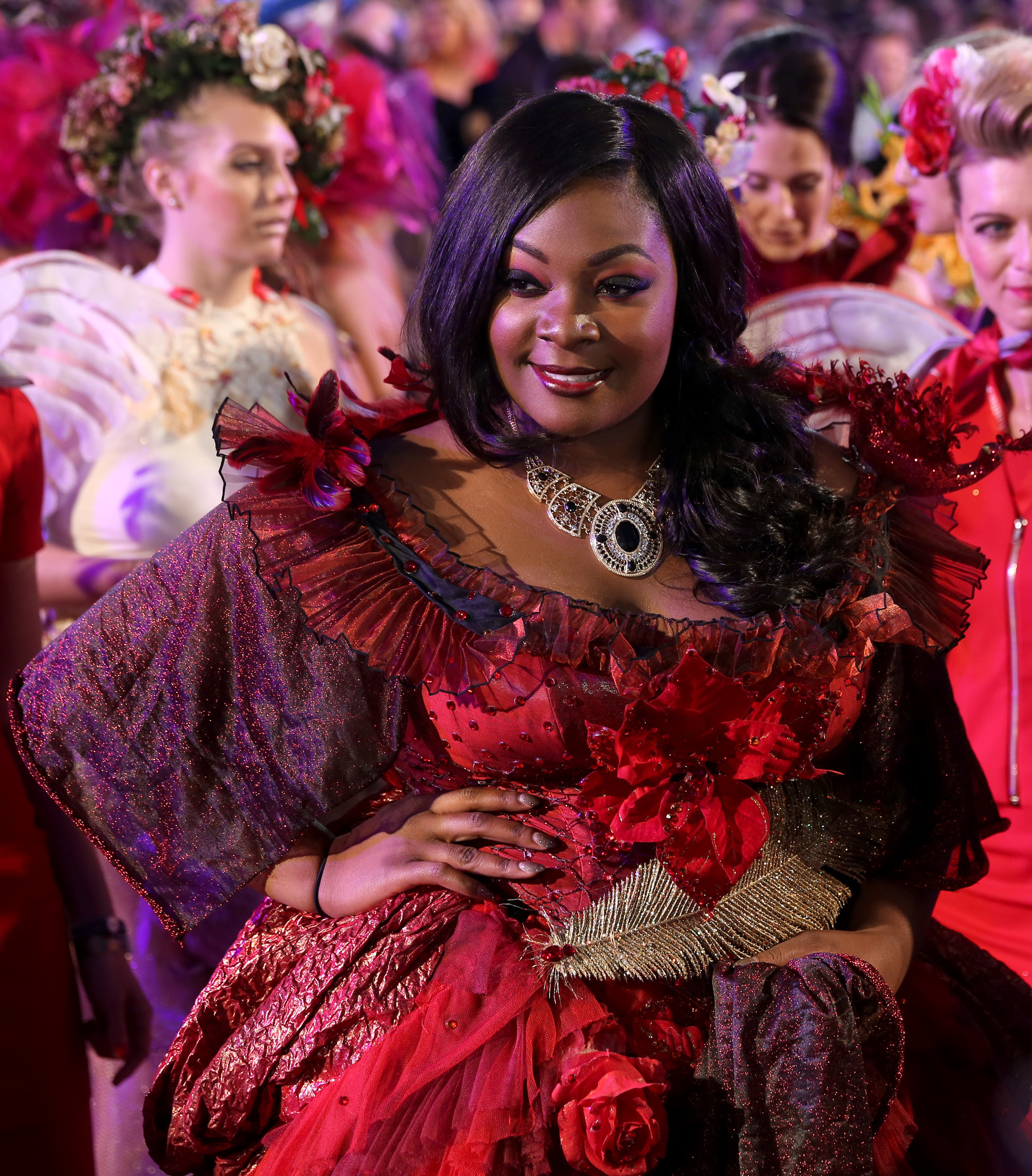
- Glover in 2014

Background information
- Born: Candice Rickelle Glover; November 22, 1989 (age 36); Beaufort, South Carolina, U.S.
- Origin: St. Helena Island, South Carolina
- Genres: R&B; jazz; pop; soul
- Occupations: Singer; actress
- Years active: 2010–present
- Labels: Interscope; 19
- Website: candiceglover-official.com

Candice Rickelle Glover (born November 22, 1989) is an American R&B singer and actress who won the twelfth season of American Idol. Glover is the first winner to have auditioned three times before being cast for the live shows. Her debut album Music Speaks was released on February 18, 2014.

== Early life ==
Candice Rickelle Glover was born on November 22, 1989, in Beaufort, South Carolina, to John and Carole Glover. She is the oldest of seven children. She graduated from Beaufort High School in 2008.

== American Idol ==
=== Overview ===
Glover auditioned in Charlotte, North Carolina. She previously auditioned in the ninth and eleventh seasons. In the ninth season Simon Cowell said that he could not see Glover being anything more than a lounge singer and she was cut during the final 70 round. She was eliminated by producers during the ninth season when she forgot the lyrics to her song "Chasing Pavements" by Adele.

=== Season 11 ===
Glover auditioned in Savannah, Georgia. She sang "Blame It on Me" by Chrisette Michele. She advanced, but her audition was not aired. In round one, she performed Karina's "Slow Motion". In round three, she sang "Someone like You" by Adele, where she received a standing ovation from the judges. She performed "It Doesn't Matter Anymore" by Buddy Holly with eleventh season finalists DeAndre Brackensick and Jessica Sanchez in the group round and was eliminated.

=== Season 12 ===
During her audition for the twelfth season, Glover sang "Syrup & Honey" by Duffy, where she received a standing ovation. Judge Randy Jackson said that she was the best performer by far in the competition. Mariah Carey called her singing "The best singing we have heard thus far." Glover advanced to Hollywood. In an interview, she said, "I thought they were going to get sick of seeing my face." For the first round in Hollywood, she sang "Impossible" by Christina Aguilera. For the second round, she performed "Hit Em Up Style" with Kamaria Ousley, Denise Jackson, and Melinda Ademi. This was named the best group the judges had seen all day. In round three, she put a jazzy twist on Alicia Keys's "Girl on Fire". It was later announced that Glover was one of the top 20 girls of the season and she advanced to Las Vegas. In Vegas, she performed "Natural Woman" by Aretha Franklin. In the semi-finals of the competition, Glover performed "Ordinary People" by John Legend. On March 7, 2013, she was voted into the Top 10. Her Top 10 performance of "I (Who Have Nothing)" by Ben E. King earned her enough votes to land among the night's top three contestants, along with Kree Harrison and Angie Miller. After her Top 6 performances, Glover earned enough votes to land in the night's top two contestants, along with Kree Harrison. She covered "Lovesong" by The Cure and broke down in tears after receiving a standing ovation. For the first time, after her Top 4 performance, she landed in the bottom two. On May 16, Glover won the contest and her debut single 'I Am Beautiful' was released to music store outlets.

=== Performances and results ===
==== Season 9 ====
Episode	Theme	Song choice	Original artist	Order #	Result
Audition	Auditioner's Choice	Not aired		N/A	Advanced
Hollywood Round, Part 1	A capella	Not aired		N/A	Advanced
Hollywood Round, Part 2	Group Performance	"Superwoman" with Shelby Dressel, Kelsey Laverack Rey, and Audri Vargas	Alicia Keys	N/A	Advanced
Hollywood Round, Part 3	Solo	Not aired		N/A	Eliminated

==== Season 11 ====
Episode	Theme	Song choice	Original artist	Order #	Result
Audition	Auditioner's Choice	"Blame It on Me"	Chrisette Michele	N/A	Advanced
Hollywood Round, Part 1	A Capella	"Slow Motion"	Lee.M & J. Pearl	N/A	Advanced
Hollywood Round, Part 2	Group Performance	Not aired with Lauren Daigle, Amber Caparas, Brittany Hammond, and Kalyn McNeil		N/A	Advanced
Hollywood Round, Part 3	Solo	"Someone like You"	Adele	N/A	Advanced
Las Vegas Round	Group Performance	"It Doesn't Matter Anymore" with DeAndre Brackensick and Jessica Sanchez	Buddy Holly	N/A	Eliminated

==== Season 12 ====
Episode	Theme	Song choice	Original artist	Order #	Result
Audition	Auditioner's Choice	"Syrup & Honey/Call Me Maybe"	Duffy/Carly Rae Jepsen	N/A	Advanced
Hollywood Round, Part 1	A Capella	"Impossible"	Christina Aguilera	N/A	Advanced
Hollywood Round, Part 2	Group Performance	"Hit 'Em Up Style (Oops!)" with Melinda Ademi, Kamaria Ousley, and Denise Jackson	Blu Cantrell	N/A	Advanced
Hollywood Round, Part 3	Solo	"Girl on Fire"	Alicia Keys	N/A	Advanced
Las Vegas Round	Personal Choice	"(You Make Me Feel Like) A Natural Woman"	Aretha Franklin	2	Advanced
Top 20 (10 Women)	Personal Choice	"Ordinary People"	John Legend	10	Advanced
Top 10 Reveal	Victory Song	"I'm Going Down"	Rose Royce	7	N/A
Top 10	Music of the American Idols	"I (Who Have Nothing)"	Ben E. King	6	Top 3
Top 9	The Beatles	"Come Together"	The Beatles	5	Safe
Top 8	Music of Motor City	Solo "I Heard It Through the Grapevine"	The Miracles	1	Safe
Top 8	Music of Motor City	Trio "I'm Gonna Make You Love Me" with Amber Holcomb and Angie Miller	Dee Dee Warwick	6	Safe
Top 7	Rock	Duet "The Letter" with Burnell Taylor	The Box Tops	4	Safe
Top 7	Rock	Solo "(I Can't Get No) Satisfaction"	The Rolling Stones	8	Safe
Top 6	Burt Bacharach and Hal David	"Don't Make Me Over"	Dionne Warwick	6	Top 2
Top 6	Songs They Wish They'd Written	"Lovesong"	The Cure	12	Top 2
Top 5	Year They Were Born	"Straight Up"	Paula Abdul	1	Safe
Top 5	Divas	"When You Believe"	Mariah Carey and Whitney Houston	6	Safe
Top 4	Contestant's Choice	Solo "Find Your Love"	Drake	2	Bottom 2^{1}
Top 4	Contestant's Choice	Duet "Stay" with Angie Miller	Rihanna feat. Mikky Ekko	6	Bottom 2^{1}
Top 4	One-Hit Wonders	"Emotion"	Samantha Sang	8	Bottom 2^{1}
Top 4^{2}	Songs from Now and Then	"When I Was Your Man"	Bruno Mars	3	Safe
Top 4^{2}	Songs from Now and Then	"You've Changed"	Harry James	7	Safe
Top 4^{2}	Songs from Now and Then	Quartet "Wings" with Kree Harrison, Amber Holcomb, and Angie Miller	Little Mix	9	Safe
Top 3	Jimmy Iovine's Choice	"One"	U2	2	Safe
Top 3	Judges' Choice	"Next to Me"	Emeli Sandé	4	Safe
Top 3	Producers' Choice	"Somewhere"	Reri Grist	9	Safe
Finale	Simon Fuller's Choice	"Chasing Pavements"	Adele	2	Winner
Finale	Winner's Single	"I Am Beautiful"	Candice Glover	4	Winner
Finale	Favorite Performance	"I (Who Have Nothing)"	Ben E. King	6	Winner

- ^Note 1 When Ryan Seacrest announced the results for this particular night, Glover was in the bottom two with Amber Holcomb, but was declared safe as no one was eliminated.
- ^Note 2 Due to the surprise non-elimination at the top 4, the top 4 remained intact for another week.

== Music Speaks ==
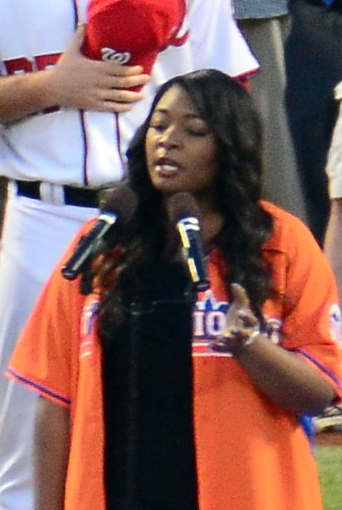
Glover singing The Star-Spangled Banner at Citi Field in 2013

Immediately following the finale broadcast on May 16, 2013, Glover's debut album, Music Speaks, along with her debut single "I Am Beautiful" was available for pre-order; this was a first for the Idol series. On May 17, 2013, Glover performed the single on The Tonight Show with Jay Leno. On May 20, 2013, Glover performed on Live! with Kelly and Michael. Glover confirmed on May 21 to be working on a more R&B influenced second single to be released. In its first week "I Am Beautiful" reached number 33 on Hot R&B/Hip-Hop Songs and number 93 on the Billboard Hot 100.

Glover took part in the American Idols LIVE! Tour 2013, beginning on July 19 and ending on August 31, 2013. Her debut album Music Speaks was released on February 18, 2014, after being pushed back from the original July 16 and October 8, 2013, dates.

Glover's second single from her debut album is called "Cried," and was released on November 25, 2013. "Cried" debuted at number 28 on the Billboard Adult R&B chart in January 2014, and has peaked at number 18.

Glover had begun work on her second studio album, due out in 2016, but it was never released. She is writing all of the material on the album herself. She announced on her Facebook page that the album will be more "her" and that there will be a duet with fellow Idol contestant Amber Holcomb.

Glover was also featured on Chadd Black's single, "Love No Fear", which was released on February 14, 2015. She will be releasing a mixtape with Black sometime in 2016. In January 2016, she announced that she had parted ways with 19 Recordings/Interscope. Her new album will be released independently, and she hopes to work with Jazmine Sullivan, Chris Brown, and/or Drake on it.

She returned to Idol for the Fox-era series finale on April 7, 2016. She performed with all the returning alumni to open the show, singing "One Voice." Later, she performed "Joy to the World" with Melinda Doolittle.

== Broadway ==
Glover sang on Broadway in the show Home For the Holidays, Live on Broadway from November 17 to December 30, 2017, at the August Wilson Theatre.

== Personal life ==
Glover says she wants to be a counselor to help girls through what she went through as a teenager. Nicki Minaj broke down in tears after Glover's performance of "Next to Me", saying that Glover has gotten so much more confident during her time on the show. Glover said she would never wear a dress on Idol, but she eventually wore one during her performance of "Somewhere," "You've Changed" by Billie Holiday and the finale. After this, girls began tweeting her saying she was their inspiration and that she made them feel more confident. Her musical influences include Christina Aguilera, Jazmine Sullivan and Brandy. In 2011, Sullivan retweeted Glover's YouTube cover of "Chasing Pavements" by Adele and called it "amazing". Glover once again performed this song on the finale of American Idol.

== Discography ==
=== Studio albums ===
Title	Album details	Peak chart positions		Sales
Title	Album details	US	US R&B	Sales
Music Speaks	Released: February 18, 2014; Label: 19, Interscope; Format: CD, Digital download	14	3	US: 65,000

=== Singles ===
Year	Title	Peak chart positions			Album
Year	Title	US	US R&B	US Heat	Album
2013	"I Am Beautiful"	93	33	6	Non-album single
2013	"Cried"	—	16	—	Music Speaks
2018	"Break Me"	—	—	—	Non-album single

=== Promotional singles ===
Year	Title	Peak chart positions			Album
Year	Title	US	US R&B	US Heat	Album
2014	"Passenger"	—	—	—	Music Speaks
2017	"My Mistake"	—	—	—	Non-album single

=== Music videos ===
Year	Title
2013	"Cried"

== Filmography ==
Television roles
Year	Title	Role	Notes
2010, 2012, 2013	American Idol	Herself / Contestant	14 episodes
2013	Disney Parks Christmas Day Parade	Herself / Performer	TV special
2013	A Capitol Fourth	Television film	Herself / Performer
2013	Live with Kelly & Michael	Herself / Musical Guest	2 episodes
2014	The View	Herself / Musical Guest	2 episodes
2014	Northpole	Josephine	Television film
2017	Underground	Gullah Woman #1	Episodes: "Contraband" and "Things Unsaid"
2019	GRITS: Girls Raised in the South	Tiana	

== See also ==
- List of Idols winners
