= Wings (Little Mix song) =

Single by Little Mix

from the album DNA
- Released: 24 August 2012
- Studio: The Music Shed (London)
- Genre: Bubblegum pop; R&B
- Length: 3:39
- Label: Syco; Columbia
- Songwriters: Thomas Barnes; Peter Kelleher; Ben Kohn; Iain James; Perrie Edwards; Jesy Nelson; Leigh-Anne Pinnock; Jade Thirlwall; Erika Nuri; Michelle Lewis; Mischke Butler; Heidi Rojas
- Producer: TMS

Little Mix singles chronology
"Cannonball" (2011)	"Wings" (2012)	"DNA" (2012)

Music video
- "Wings" on YouTube

"Wings" is a song by British girl group Little Mix. It was released 24 August 2012, through Syco Music and Columbia Records as the lead single from their debut studio album DNA (2012). The song was written by group members Leigh-Anne Pinnock, Jesy Nelson, Jade Thirlwall, and Perrie Edwards, with the production team TMS and songwriters Iain James, Erika Nuri, Michelle Lewis, Mischke Butler and Heidi Rojas. The song was lyrically inspired by the hardships they had experienced while contestants on The X Factor UK. Described as a bubblegum pop and R&B track, the song's production is mixed with bombastic brass that was inspired by Christina Aguilera's album Back to Basics.

"Wings" was acclaimed by music critics who found it catchy, complimented its double chorus, the group's vocal performance and considered it one of the best introductions to a band that would go on to re-define what a girl-group can do, act and sound like. Wings has been credited with helping to shape the Little Mix brand with messages of girl power and feminism. It has also been cited for helping the girl band renaissance in the UK during the late 00s and into the early 10s. The song peaked at number one in the UK Singles Chart, selling over 106,000 copies in its first week and later becoming the group's second number-one in the UK. It also made them only the third winners from The X Factor UK to follow up their winner's single with a second number-one single.

The single was also a success in other countries. It topped the Irish Singles Charts and reached the top ten in Australia and Japan, and charted in nine other countries including South Korea, Canada, and France. It reached number seventy-nine on the US Billboard Hot 100. A Japanese and Korean version of the track was later released. Little Mix performed "Wings" at the One Love Manchester, following the Manchester Arena bombing in 2017. It has been performed on all seven of the group's tours, the most recent being The Confetti Tour in 2022.

== Writing and inspiration ==
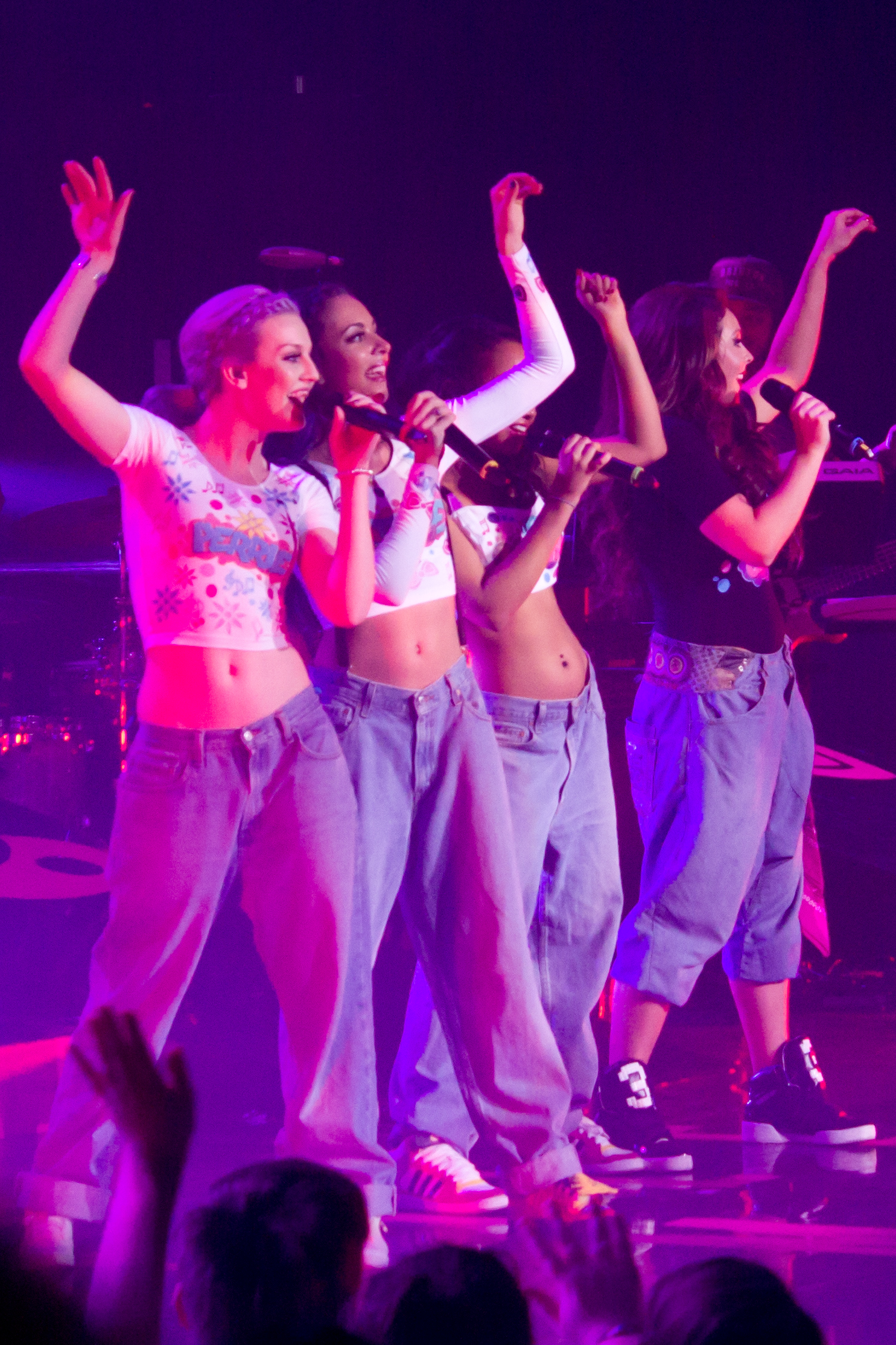
Little Mix performing "Wings" during their 2013 DNA Tour.

Little Mix wanted their first original single after winning the eighth UK series of The X Factor to be instantly recognisable when it was played on the radio and believed that without their own input, the track would misrepresent their sound. After working with producers for around a month and being new to group writing, the band struggled to find a song they liked. Group member Jesy Nelson said, "We were like, 'We want our sound to be Nicki Minaj, mixed with Missy Elliott with a bit of En Vogue put in a blender.' I think everyone got so confused. We'd hear some of the songs and were like, 'Oh my God, we're never going to get it.'" However, when production team TMS played them a backing track of "Wings", Nelson recalled, "my hairs stood up on my arms and I was like 'Oh my god!', and I looked at the girls and I went 'That's our first single.'"

The band wrote most of "Wings" with TMS and songwriter Iain James in February 2012 but writing continued until they felt the song was complete. Michelle Lewis, Erika Nuri, Mischke Butler and Heidi Rojas are also credited as songwriters. It was important to Little Mix for "Wings" to showcase their vocals individually, and have complex harmonies and melodies. Eschewing dance music popular at the time, it was composed as a retro-style pop and R&B song, influenced by music by Beyoncé and Michael Jackson. Jade Thirlwall from the band said, "It was really important for us to bring something fresh and different to the table".

The lyrics were inspired by doubt and negativity Little Mix experienced as a girl band during The X Factor, and being the favourites for elimination during the first week of live shows. They were disheartened by odds overheard in the show's green room and paparazzi predicting their elimination interview on British daytime television programme This Morning the following Monday. "Wings" was also written as an uplifting message for the group's fans to relate to. The band, however, did not want the song to sound "cheesy" or as though they were preaching; instead, they wrote it with a theme of maternal advice using the line "Mama told me not to waste my time". The track was recorded at The Music Shed in London.

== Composition ==
Composed in E minor with a time signature of 4/4, "Wings" is a bubblegum pop and R&B song with a tempo of 112 beats per minute. The music comprises syncopated, double-timed handclaps, and a varying kick and snare drum arrangement. Other instruments include guitar, keyboards, as well as woodwind and brass types: alto, baritone and tenor saxophones, trombone and trumpet. Brief use of wobbly bass synthesizer during the verses add a contrasting dubstep element. Little Mix's vocal range spans from B_{3} to E_{5}. Journalist Alfred Soto writes that the song "never stops for a breath."

"Wings"
A 22-second sample of the song where the snare drum is omitted in the pre-chorus before returning on the chorus.

The song opens with a brief brass introduction that ends with a B7 chord. An Em chord then introduces the four-on-the-floor arrangement and first chanted chorus, backed by sparse drums and rhythmic ad-libs. During the verses, a bass synthesizer creates an interval between each member's solo, on the preceding member's last line. The pre-chorus has a chord progression of Am7–Bm7–Cmaj–D, while the double chorus has a sequence of Em–G6–Dsus2–C–Dsus2–E–G–D–C6–Dsus2–E. Unusually among double choruses in pop music, "Wings" has a key change to E major halfway on the harmonised lyric "fly", sustaining the song's momentum. This is built up by transition effects and a brief return to the four on the floor kick drum sequence. The group's vocals then become more sustained and use melisma as the stereo widens and pitch increases.

The second verse starts with eighth note delay taps on the first lyric "I'm", which gradually becomes louder until properly sung, using an A–B pitch change which increases harmonic momentum by implying a return to the cadential D chord in the chorus, instead of a continuation of the tonic E. A breakdown occurs after the second double chorus, where "hey" is chanted repeatedly at the end of each line in a call and response. Following a third double chorus, the song ends with an outro in which the members sing accompanied by the introduction of a drum pattern reminiscent of that of a military band.

According to Nelson, the lyrics have a message of "not taking any crap from anyone and believing in yourself," "being individual and not being afraid to be who you want to be and if you have a dream, you should follow it." Thirlwall said "Wings" is about the group "ever being put down and just saying, 'You know what, we don't care, we're doing our thing'."

== Release ==
Little Mix first announced the single's release on Twitter on 30 May 2012. The following day, its cover art was revealed on Facebook, featuring a new group logo and signature icons for each member. On 1 June 2012, the single was made available for pre-order from the iTunes Store and a short excerpt was played during the group's appearance on the British television show Alan Carr: Chatty Man.

On 2 July 2012, "Wings" premiered on BBC Radio 1's The Greg James Show and a lyric video was shared on Vevo. To promote the single, Little Mix embarked on a radio tour in July 2012; they visited over 20 UK radio stations and did meet and greets as part of a social media competition for their fans. The "Wings" release, however, was then postponed twice, resulting in purchasers of initial pre-orders having to pre-order the single again. The release was to coincide with their performance on British television game show Red or Black?, but was postponed because the episode aired later due to filming issues with a contestant on the show. Syco Music first released the single as a digital extended play (EP) in Ireland on 24 August 2012. In the UK, the song was released two days later in digital EP and CD single formats.

In Australia, the single was released as a digital EP and CD single on 5 and 30 October 2012, respectively. The same month, the group travelled to Australia to promote the track in a series of radio and television appearances. On 5 February 2013, Columbia Records released "Wings" as Little Mix's debut single in the US. It was sent to contemporary hit radio playlists there two weeks later. To promote the single in the US, they embarked on a radio tour and met fans at shopping malls in March and April 2013.

== Critical reception ==
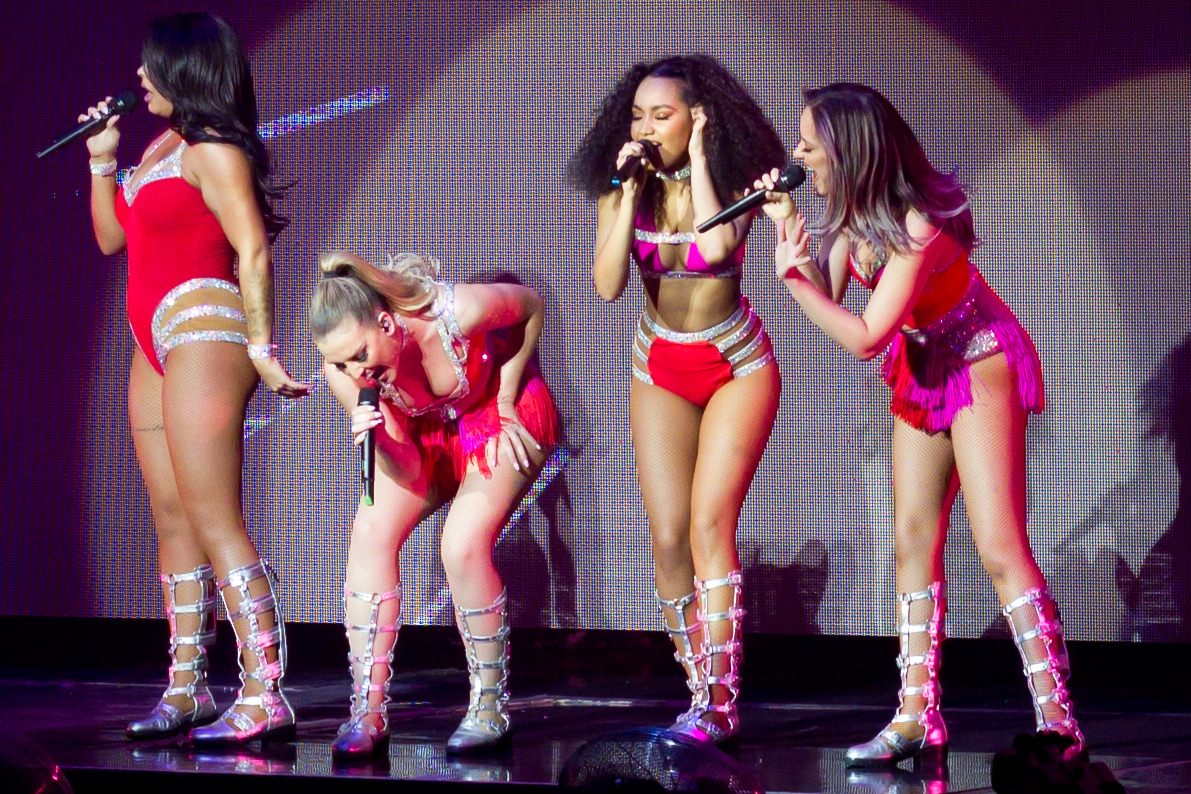
Little Mix performing the song during The Get Weird Tour in 2016.

"Wings" was generally well received by music critics. Robert Copsey from Digital Spy gave the track four stars out of five and said it resoundingly lived up to expectations and was a very promising first original single for the group. Joe Rivers of No Ripcord gave "Wings" a rating of nine out of ten, calling it "vivacious, fun, brash and confident" and noting its "absolute belter of a chorus". BBC Music's Al Fox called the song "addictive", while Mikael Wood, writing in the Los Angeles Times, complimented the "big chorus" and the "chewy production touch" of its bass synthesizer.

The Independent's reviewer regarded the song as "somewhat Christina Aguilera-ish" and wrote, "Yes that's right: X Factor winners in quite good, non-cover single shocker." Tim Lee from musicOMH noted similarities with Aguilera's 2006 single "Ain't No Other Man", and called it "an absolutely stomping pop song" and "possibly the best mass market pop song since Girls Aloud's heyday". In The Times, Lisa Verrico wrote that "'Wings' rivalled primetime Girls Aloud for its inventiveness and energy." Fiona Shepherd of The Scotsman was impressed by the strength of the song's melody and delivery. Michael Cragg of The Guardian said "Wings" had "everything you'd want to hear in a pop song in 2012" and likened Little Mix's "ridiculous vocal runs" to those of Aguilera.

In The Irish Times, Eoin Butler gave the song three stars out of five, calling it a "a stomper ... in the vein of Beyoncé's 'Single Ladies'. Just not as good, obviously." On the other hand, NME's Matt Wilkinson dismissed it as "every bit as pain-inducing as you thought it would be". In his review for DIY magazine, Eddie Argos said the track sounds "like shopping in New Look". Argos added, "It's obviously the best song in the country, because they won The X Factor. The public have decided." In 2012, "Wings" placed at number 35 on No Ripcord's year-end list and was shortlisted for the Popjustice £20 Music Prize. At the 2014 Radio Disney Music Awards, it was nominated for Best Song to Dance To.

== Chart performance ==
In September 2012, "Wings" debuted at number one on the UK Singles Chart with first-week sales of 106,766 copies, becoming Little Mix's second consecutive number-one single in the UK. They became the third winner of The X Factor (UK) after Leona Lewis and Alexandra Burke to follow up their winner's single with a second number-one single. It also made them the final winners from the show to sell over a 100,000 copies in its opening week with their debut single. The track dropped to number four in its second week, selling 59,355 copies. It spent 25 weeks on the chart and placed at number 40 in the 2012 year-end chart, and was certified double platinum by the British Phonographic Industry (BPI). According to the Official Charts Company, "Wings" has sold over a million copies as of 2022. It has racked up 549,000 downloads, 112 million streams, and ranks as the group's eighth-best-selling single in the UK.

The song also topped the Irish Singles Chart in its first week, making it Little Mix's second successive number-one single in Ireland. "Wings" became the band's highest-charting single in Australia, where it peaked at number three on the ARIA Singles Chart. It was certified triple platinum by the Australian Recording Industry Association (ARIA) for sales of 210,000 copies. The track also reached number 15 on the New Zealand Singles Chart. In the US, "Wings" peaked at number 79 on the Billboard Hot 100 and spent nine weeks on the chart. It was certified gold by the Recording Industry Association of America (RIAA) for selling 500,000 copies. In Canada, the song charted at number 69 on the Canadian Hot 100 and received a gold certification from Music Canada for sales of 40,000 copies. "Wings" also became Little Mix's highest-charting single in Japan, where it climbed to number seven on the Japan Hot 100, and ranked at number 46 in the 2013 year-end chart. In Brazil, the song was certified gold by Pro-Música Brasil for selling 30,000 units.

== Music video ==
The music video for "Wings" was directed by Max & Dania, and produced by Scott Clark. It was filmed at Elstree Studios on 11 May 2012. The video took nearly a full day to shoot due to many retakes of the choreography. Thirlwall recalled, "We were absolutely shattered because there was so much dancing to do... It was exhausting, but then you think 'we've just made our first video' and that perks you up." However, most of the dance routine was cut from the final edit which premiered on 25 July 2012. The video was accidentally released to the US iTunes Store the same day, months ahead of its 2013 US release, but was promptly taken down. A clip from the dance rehearsals featuring the full routine was released on YouTube on 30 July 2012. A making of segment was shared on YouTube on 6 August 2012.

During the music video, each group member wears three different outfits, all of which portray their individual styles. The video begins with a four-window split-screen in which each member mimes the song's words. The group then dance separately in front of brightly-coloured backdrops that represent each member's personal icon; a flower (Perrie Edwards), a bow-tie (Thirlwall), a cap (Leigh-Anne Pinnock), and boombox (Nelson). First introduced in the single's cover art, the icons promote each member's personal identity. Near the end of the video, the group are accompanied by male backing dancers for a hip hop and chair dance routine in front of a backdrop resembling the Union Jack.

MTV's Sam Lansky found the music video dazzling and cited the chair dancing as his favourite since that of "Stronger" by Britney Spears, and said, "Who needs to be high-concept when you have this much attitude?" Conversely, Ruth Saxelby of The Guardian compared the video to a sanitary pad advertisement.

== Live performances ==
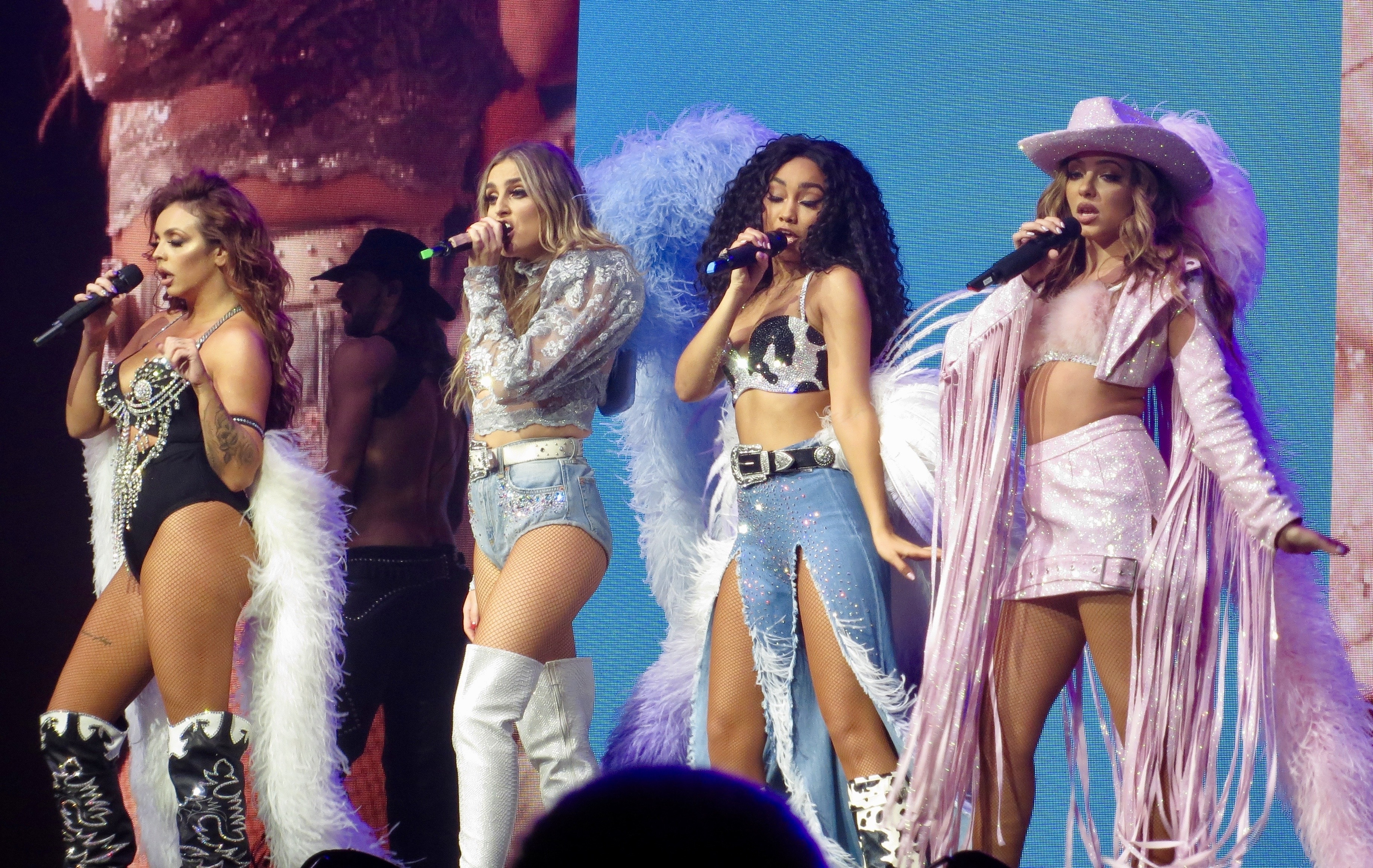
Little Mix performing "Wings" during 2017's The Glory Days Tour.

Little Mix debuted "Wings" with a performance at T4 on the Beach that aired live on Channel 4 on 1 July 2012. A rehearsal video filmed prior to the rendition was shared by the group on 9 July 2012. Little Mix performed the song on British children's entertainment television programme Friday Download on 13 July 2012, This Morning on 20 August 2012, and on Red or Black? on 25 August 2012. The group performed the song on a revamped version of British breakfast television programme Daybreak on 3 September 2012. Arriving by helicopter, they performed from an outdoor stage in South Bank. On 7 October 2012, Little Mix performed the track along with "DNA" at BBC Radio 1's Teen Awards. To promote "Wings" in Australia, the group performed the song on the fourth Australian series of The X Factor on 30 October 2012, and on Australian breakfast television programme Sunrise the following day. On 11 November 2012, they gave an acoustic rendition on the British series of The Xtra Factor. In Ireland, the group performed the song along with "DNA" at the ChildLine Concert which was broadcast on TV3 on 1 December 2012. On 8 December 2012, the track was included in their set list for Capital FM's Jingle Bell Ball. Dressed in star-themed black and pink outfits, the group performed the song without Edwards who was ill following a tonsillectomy.

During Little Mix's 2013 DNA Tour, "Wings" and its remix by The Alias were performed as the sixth song and encore reprise. The group performed the song wearing 1990s-style baggy jeans and personalised crop tops. On 25 April 2013, they performed the track on French television programme Le Grand Journal. On 7 June 2013, the band made their US television debut with a performance of "Wings" on morning talk show Good Morning America. The group also performed the song on American morning talk show Live with Kelly and Michael on 10 June 2013. On 13 September 2013, Little Mix performed the track on Japanese music programme Music Station.

For their 2014 Salute Tour, the band performed "Wings" as the closing encore wearing Grecian-themed, matching black dresses and ended their renditions with confetti showers. During the first act of 2016's The Get Weird Tour, Little Mix performed the song wearing bright pink leotards. On 4 June 2017, the group performed the track in monochrome outfits at One Love Manchester, a benefit concert for victims of the Manchester Arena bombing that was broadcast live on BBC One. In a speech ahead of the performance, Thirlwall said they wrote the song "in the hopes that it would empower people to stand together and to not let anything bring them down". For 2017's The Glory Days Tour, the group performed "Wings" wearing showgirl outfits with feather boas; during the song, golden butterflies were fired into the audience. The track was also performed as part of the setlists for their Summer Hits Tour in 2018 and LM5: The Tour in 2019.

== Use in media ==
English band Scouting for Girls performed a cover of "Wings" in BBC Radio 1's Live Lounge on 30 August 2012; this performance was included on the compilation album, BBC Radio 1's Live Lounge 2012. During week five of the eighth series of Dancing on Ice, Samia Ghadie and Sylvain Longchambon skated to the song on 3 February 2013. In the US, "Wings" received a number of high-profile television placements. Candice Glover, Angie Miller, Kree Harrison and Amber Holcomb gave a live rendition of the song during the quarter-final of the twelfth series of American Idol on 1 May 2013. Jessica Sanchez performed the track during the fourth series finale episode of Glee, "All or Nothing" (aired on 9 May 2013). Alan Bersten, Brittany Cherry, Jenna Johnson and Paul Karmiryan samba-danced to "Wings" on the tenth US series of So You Think You Can Dance on 18 June 2013. Dancing with the Stars US series 17 winners Amber Riley and Derek Hough performed the cha-cha-cha to the song during the series premiere on 16 September 2013. Ellona Santiago covered the track for her audition on the third US series of The X Factor.

In week four of the live shows of the fifth Australian series of The X Factor in September 2013, contestant Ellie Lovegrove covered the song. Patrick Robinson and Anya Garnis performed the salsa to the track during week five of the eleventh series of Strictly Come Dancing on 26 October 2013. In November 2013, BBC Radio 3 released an orchestral mash-up of "Wings" and "Ride of the Valkyries" by a female ensemble from The Hallé and BBC Philharmonic orchestras as a charity single for Children in Need 2013. On 11 March 2015, contestant Tyanna Jones performed the song during the live shows of the fourteenth series of American Idol. Mollie King and AJ Pritchard performed the Charleston to "Wings" during week nine of the fifteenth series of Strictly Come Dancing on 18 November 2017.

== Track listing ==
Digital EP
No.	Title	Length
1.	"Wings"	3:39
2.	"Wings" (The Alias Club Mix)	5:02
3.	"Wings" (Sunship Extended Mix)	4:57
4.	"Wings" (Instrumental)	3:39

UK CD single
No.	Title	Length
1.	"Wings"	3:39
2.	"Wings" (The Alias Club Mix)	5:02
3.	"Wings" (Sunship Extended Mix)	4:57

Australia CD single
No.	Title	Length
1.	"Wings"	3:39
2.	"Wings" (The Alias Radio Edit)	3:39

Digital download – Korean version
No.	Title	Length
1.	"Wings" (날개; Korean version)	3:39

== Personnel ==
Credits adapted from the album liner notes of DNA.

- TMS – production, arrangement
- James F Reynolds – additional vocal production
- Iain James – backing vocals, vocal arrangement
- Carmen Reece – backing vocals, vocal arrangement
- Peter Kelleher – keyboards
- Kick Horns – brass
- Simon Clarke – arrangement, alto and baritone saxophones
- Tim Sanders – arrangement, tenor saxophone
- David Liddell – trombone
- Ryan Quigley – trumpet
- Darren Wiles – trumpet
- MNEK – additional programming
- Thomas Barnes – drums
- Ben Kohn – guitar
- Dan Aslet – additional vocal engineering
- Serban Ghenea – mixing
- John Hanes – mixing engineer
- Phil Seaford – mixing assistant
- Tom Coyne – mastering

== Charts ==
=== Weekly charts ===
Chart (2012–2013)	Peak position
Australia (ARIA)	3
Belgium (Ultratip Bubbling Under Flanders)	7
Canada Hot 100 (Billboard)	69
Canada CHR/Top 40 (Billboard)	41
Canada Hot AC (Billboard)	45
Czech Republic Airplay (ČNS IFPI)	91
Euro Digital Song Sales (Billboard)	1
France (SNEP)	165
Hungary (Rádiós Top 40)	22
Ireland (IRMA)	1
Japan Hot 100 (Billboard)	7
New Zealand (Recorded Music NZ)	15
Scottish Singles Sales (Official Charts)	1
Slovakia Airplay (ČNS IFPI)	26
South Korea International (Gaon)	15
UK Singles (Official Charts)	1
UK Airplay (Music Week)	3
US Billboard Hot 100	79
US Pop Airplay (Billboard)	26

=== Year-end charts ===
Chart (2012)	Position
Australia (ARIA)	82
UK Singles (OCC)	40

Chart (2013)	Position
Japan (Japan Hot 100)	46

== Certifications ==
Region	Certification	Certified units/sales
Australia (ARIA)	3× Platinum	210,000^{^}
Brazil (Pro-Música Brasil)	Platinum	60,000^{‡}
Canada (Music Canada)	Gold	40,000^{*}
New Zealand (RMNZ)	Platinum	15,000^{*}
United Kingdom (BPI)	2× Platinum	1,200,000^{‡}
United States (RIAA)	Gold	500,000^{‡}
^{*} Sales figures based on certification alone.^{^} Shipments figures based on certification alone.^{‡} Sales+streaming figures based on certification alone.

== Release history ==
Country	Date	Format	Label	Ref.
Ireland	24 August 2012	Digital download (Remixes EP)	Syco	
United Kingdom	26 August 2012	CD single	Syco	
United Kingdom	26 August 2012	Digital download (Remixes EP)	Syco	
Australia	5 October 2012	Digital download (Remixes EP)	Syco	
Australia	30 October 2012	CD single	Syco	
United States	5 February 2013	Digital download	Columbia	
United States	19 February 2013	Contemporary hit radio	Columbia	
South Korea	19 August 2013	Digital download (Korean version)	Syco	
