= Janelle Arthur =

American singer and songwriter

- Born: Janelle Oredith Arthur; December 12, 1989 (age 36); Oliver Springs, Tennessee
- Genres: Country
- Occupations: Singer, songwriter
- Instruments: Vocals, guitar
- Years active: 2011–present
- Website: www.janellearthur.com

Janelle Oredith Arthur (born December 12, 1989) is an American singer and songwriter, who came in fifth place on the twelfth season of American Idol.

== Early life ==
Arthur was born on December 12, 1989, in Oliver Springs, Tennessee, to Gentile Dean and Judy Arthur. She grew up in the congregation of the Churches of Christ at Oliver Springs and is still an active member. When Arthur was eight years old, she portrayed Dolly Parton in a theatrical production of Dolly's life at Dollywood theme park. In 2001, Arthur was hired as a child performer for the Country Tonite Theater, in Pigeon Forge, Tennessee. Arthur later returned to the Country Tonite Theater stage as an adult performer and remained with the cast for another four years. She performed in over 3,000 shows in the Pigeon Forge area from 1998 to 2009.

In 2010, Arthur moved to Nashville, Tennessee, to pursue her music career.

== Career ==
=== 2012–13: American Idol ===
Arthur auditioned in Charlotte, North Carolina. She had auditioned twice before, in the tenth and eleventh seasons. In the tenth season, she was cut in the group round, and in the eleventh season she made it to the Las Vegas round. In the semi-finals of the twelfth season, she performed "If I Can Dream" by Elvis Presley. On March 7, 2013, she was voted into the top 10. She was eliminated on April 18, 2013, and came in fifth place.

=== Performances and results ===
==== Season 11 ====
Episode	Theme	Song choice	Original artist	Order #	Result
Audition	Auditioner's Choice	Not aired	Not aired	N/A	Advanced
Hollywood Round, Part 1	A Capella	Not aired	Not aired	N/A	Advanced
Hollywood Round, Part 2	Group Performance	Not aired	Not aired	N/A	Advanced
Hollywood Round, Part 3	Solo	Not aired	Not aired	N/A	Advanced
Las Vegas Round	Group Performance	"Be My Baby"	The Ronettes	N/A	Eliminated

==== Season 12 ====
Episode	Theme	Song choice	Original artist	Order #	Result
Audition	Auditioner's Choice	"Where the Blacktop Ends"/ "Walkin' The Country"	Keith Urban	N/A	Advanced
Hollywood Round, Part 1	A Capella	"I'm So Lonesome I Could Cry"	Hank Williams	N/A	Advanced
Hollywood Round, Part 2	Group Performance	Quartet "Be My Baby" with Angie Miller and Breanna Steer and Kez Ban	The Ronettes	N/A	Advanced
Hollywood Round, Part 3	Solo	"I Told You So"	Randy Travis	N/A	Advanced
Las Vegas Round	Personal Choice	"Just a Kiss"	Lady Antebellum	9	Advanced
Top 20 (10 Women)	Personal Choice	"If I Can Dream"	Elvis Presley	4	Advanced
Top 10 Reveal	Victory Song	"Home"	Dierks Bentley	6	N/A
Top 10	Music of the American Idols	"Gone"	Montgomery Gentry	2	6th
Top 9	The Beatles	"I Will"	The Beatles	9	Safe
Top 8	Music of Motor City	Duet "Like a Prayer" with Kree Harrison	Madonna	2	Safe
Top 8	Music of Motor City	Solo "You Keep Me Hangin' On"	The Supremes	4	Safe
Top 7	Rock	Solo "You May Be Right"	Billy Joel	5	Bottom 2^{1}
Top 7	Rock	Trio "It's Still Rock and Roll to Me" with Kree Harrison and Amber Holcomb	Billy Joel	7	Bottom 2^{1}
Top 6	Burt Bacharach and Hal David	"I'll Never Fall in Love Again"	Jerry Orbach and Jill O'Hara	5	Safe
Top 6	Songs They Wish They'd Written	"The Dance"	Garth Brooks	11	Safe
Top 5	Year they Were Born	"When I Call Your Name"	Vince Gill	2	Eliminated
Top 5	Divas	"Dumb Blonde"	Dolly Parton	7	Eliminated

- ^Note 1 When Ryan Seacrest announced the results for this particular night, Arthur was in the bottom two, but declared safe as Burnell Taylor was eliminated.

=== 2013–2017: Recordings and Grand Ole Opry ===
Arthur took part in the American Idols LIVE! Tour 2013, beginning on July 19 and ending on August 31, 2013. Arthur has been a frequent performer at the Grand Ole Opry, appearing 16 times over the past two years.

Janelle's post-idol debut single, What You Asked For was released on May 6, 2014.

Her first EP, Janelle, was released in November 2015.

On April 21, 2017, Arthur released "Light Myself on Fire" written by herself and Dana Jorgensen and produced by Brad Hill.

=== 2018–present: Runnin' from My Roots ===
Arthur played country music star Faith Winters in the film Runnin' from My Roots that was released on December 11, 2018.

== Discography ==
=== Janelle ===
Produced by Brad Hill

No.	Title	Writer(s)	Length
1.	"Pine Hill"	Janelle Arthur, Marty Dodson, Jennifer Hanson	3:39
2.	"Same Ol Same Ol"	Arthur, Victoria Veneir	3:10
3.	"Front Porch Swing"	Arthur, Dana Jorgensen	4:21
4.	"Live Again"	Arthur, Jorgensen	3:23
5.	"Love You Anyway"	Arthur, Jorgensen	4:12
6.	"This Ole Six String"	Arthur, Jorgensen	3:59
Total length:			22:44

=== Singles ===
Title	Year	Album
"Light Myself on Fire"	2017	Non-album single
"Runnin' from My Roots"	2019	Runnin' from My Roots (Original Motion Picture Soundtrack)
"White Horse"	2020	Non-album singles
"Chasing Ghosts"	2020	Non-album singles
"Hand Me Downs" (featuring Dolly Parton)	2021	Non-album singles

== Filmography ==
Film and television
Year	Title	Role
2013	American Idol	Contestant
2018	Runnin' from my Roots	Faith Winters
2025	Five Date Rule	Hattie Fisher
