= American Idol season 12 =

American Idol
- Season 12
- Hosted by: Ryan Seacrest
- Judges: Mariah Carey; Randy Jackson; Nicki Minaj; Keith Urban
- Winner: Candice Glover
- Runner-up: Kree Harrison
- Finals venue: Nokia Theatre L.A. Live
- Mentor: Jimmy Iovine

Release
- Original network: Fox
- Original release: January 16 – May 16, 2013

Season chronology
- ← Previous; Season 11 Next → Season 13

The twelfth season of American Idol premiered on January 16, 2013, as part of the mid-season of the 2012–13 network television season. Ryan Seacrest returned as host. Randy Jackson returned for his twelfth season as judge and was joined by new judges Mariah Carey, Nicki Minaj, and Keith Urban, who replaced Jennifer Lopez and Steven Tyler.

On May 16, 2013, Candice Glover was crowned the winner, defeating Kree Harrison, who was the runner-up. In a series first, Glover's debut album, Music Speaks, was available for preorder immediately following the finale broadcast. Both Mariah Carey and Nicki Minaj left after this season, having only served on the judges panel for one season, to focus on their music careers.

== Changes from previous seasons ==
After a sharp drop in ratings during the eleventh season, Fox entertainment president Kevin Reilly announced that the show would undergo "some creative tweaking" for the following season. After two seasons, judges Jennifer Lopez and Steven Tyler announced their exits from the series on July 12 and 13, 2012, respectively. On July 23, Mariah Carey was announced as a judge for the twelfth season. On September 16, returning judge Randy Jackson and new hires Nicki Minaj and Keith Urban were confirmed to also serve on the judges panel. On December 31, 2012, it was announced that Ryan Seacrest had signed on to remain the host for at least two more seasons.

Producer Nigel Lythgoe indicated on January 9, 2013, that during the Hollywood rounds, the men and women would perform on separate weeks, and be matched in equal number right up until the top 10 live shows. He also announced that there would be no Wild Cards. Instead, he instituted a brand new "sudden death" round in which the top 40 had to perform in front of a live audience, and then the judges would choose five out of the ten contestants per show to proceed to the top 20. The number of finalists was limited to ten for the first time since the first season.

This season also introduced the "SuperVote," where viewers were able to cast fifty votes at once online or through the new American Idol app, in addition to the regular voting methods. Voters were able to allocate any number of votes to one contestant or multiple contestants, for a total of fifty votes, across all online voting destinations.

This season also showcased an "Idol Update" segment by bringing back many American Idol alumni to perform or appear as guests in the audience. Alumni performers included Kelly Clarkson, Clay Aiken, Fantasia, Jennifer Hudson, Carrie Underwood, Katharine McPhee, Jordin Sparks, David Cook, Adam Lambert, Lee DeWyze, Scotty McCreery, Lauren Alaina, Phillip Phillips, Colton Dixon, and Jessica Sanchez.

== Regional auditions ==
In an attempt to refresh the show's audition process, new means to audition were announced. First was the "American Idol Small Town Audition Bus Tour": a ten-town nationwide tour that gave hopefuls who couldn't make it to one of the large audition cities a chance to try out. These cities included Idaho Falls, Idaho; Billings, Montana; Casper, Wyoming; Rock Rapids, Iowa; Iowa City, Iowa; Bowling Green, Kentucky; Clarksdale, Mississippi; Joplin, Missouri; Dodge City, Kansas; and Grand Junction, Colorado. American Idol also began a "Nominate an Idol" program, which allowed friends and family of individuals they think could be the next American Idol to nominate said person in secret by filling out an online form and submitting a video of their nominee singing solo and a cappella. The chosen nominees would then be surprised on location by a film crew and given an opportunity to advance to the next round. Finally, online auditions for the twelfth season were open from August 1 to 14, 2012, and October 12 to November 4, 2012.

Auditions took place in the following cities:

American Idol (season 12) – regional auditions
City	Preliminary date	Preliminary venue	Filming date(s)	Filming venue	Golden tickets
Los Angeles, California	June 7, 2012	Dodger Stadium	November 14–15, 2012	Queen Mary	50
San Antonio, Texas	June 14, 2012	Alamodome	November 11–12, 2012	Sunset Station	Unknown (Note: The actual number of golden tickets handed out at this audition city was not announced.)
Charlotte, North Carolina	June 19, 2012	Time Warner Cable Arena	October 2–3, 2012	Charlotte Motor Speedway	37
Newark, New Jersey	June 23, 2012	Prudential Center	September 16–17, 2012	Jazz at Lincoln Center	41
Chicago, Illinois	July 12, 2012	United Center	September 25–26, 2012	Adler Planetarium	47
New Orleans, Louisiana	July 17, 2012	New Orleans Arena	October 5–6, 2012	Baton Rouge River Center	35
Oklahoma City, Oklahoma	July 20, 2012	Chesapeake Energy Arena	November 9–10, 2012	Devon Boathouse	45
Total number of tickets to Hollywood					286

== Hollywood & Las Vegas ==
For the first time, the Hollywood rounds were held in the Valley Performing Arts Center in Northridge, California. The contestants were separated by gender, with the men performing in the first week and the women the next. There were three rounds each week: an a cappella performance, a group performance, and a solo performance. Unlike previous seasons, the groups were chosen by the producers, although each group was able to select a song from a list of twenty songs to perform. The men performed on February 6 and 7 and the women performed on February 13 and 14. The judges selected 20 men and 20 women to perform in front of a live studio audience at Love by Cirque De Soleil at The Mirage in Las Vegas. Only twenty contestants moved on from this round. The contestants were divided into four gender-separated groups of ten, with the women's performances airing on Wednesdays and the men's performances airing on Thursdays. Contestants performed in front of the judges and a studio audience, and received critiques from the judges at the end. After all of the contestants had performed, they were called one at a time to face the judges, who decided whether they would move on to the semifinals or not.

Color key:

This contestant was chosen by the judges to move on to the semifinals.
This contestant was eliminated.

=== Group 1 ===
Contestants are listed in the order they performed.

Female contestants (February 20)
Contestant	Song	Result
Jenny Beth Willis	"Heaven, Heartache and the Power of Love"	Eliminated
Tenna Torres	"Soulmate"	Advanced
Adriana Latonio	"Ain't No Way"	Advanced
Brandy Hotard	"Anymore"	Eliminated
Shubha Vedula	"Born This Way"	Eliminated
Kamaria Ousley	"Mr. Know It All"	Eliminated
Kree Harrison	"Up to the Mountain (MLK Song)"	Advanced
Angie Miller	"Nobody's Perfect"	Advanced
Isabelle Pasqualone	"God Bless the Child"	Eliminated
Amber Holcomb	"My Funny Valentine"	Advanced

Male contestants (February 21)
Contestant	Song	Result
Paul Jolley	"Tonight I Wanna Cry"	Advanced
Johnny Keyser	"I Won't Give Up"	Eliminated
JDA	"Rumour Has It"	Eliminated
Kevin Harris	"(Everything I Do) I Do It for You"	Eliminated
Chris Watson	"(Sittin' On) The Dock of the Bay"	Eliminated
Devin Velez	"Listen"	Advanced
Elijah Liu	"Talking to the Moon"	Advanced
Charlie Askew	"Rocket Man"	Advanced
Jimmy Smith	"Raining on Sunday"	Eliminated
Curtis Finch, Jr.	"Superstar"	Advanced

=== Group 2 ===
Contestants are listed in the order they performed.

Female contestants (February 27)
Contestant	Song	Result
Melinda Ademi	"Nobody's Perfect"	Eliminated
Candice Glover	"(You Make Me Feel Like) A Natural Woman"	Advanced
Juliana Chahayed	"Skyscraper"	Eliminated
Jett Hermano	"Only Girl (In the World)"	Eliminated
Cristabel Clack	"No One"	Eliminated
Aubrey Cleland	"Sweet Dreams"	Advanced
Rachel Hale	"Nothing but the Water"	Eliminated
Breanna Steer	"Bust Your Windows"	Advanced
Janelle Arthur	"Just a Kiss"	Advanced
Zoanette Johnson	"Circle of Life"	Advanced

Male contestants (February 28)
Contestant	Song	Result
Mathenee Treco	"A Little Less Conversation"	Eliminated
Gurpreet Singh Sarin	"Nothing Ever Hurt Like You"	Eliminated
Vincent Powell	"Cause I Love You"	Advanced
Nick Boddington	"Say Something Now"	Advanced
Josh Holiday	"I'm Better with You"	Eliminated
David Oliver Willis	"Fever"	Eliminated
Bryant Tadeo	"New York State of Mind"	Eliminated
Burnell Taylor	"This Time"	Advanced
Lazaro Arbos	"Tonight I Wanna Cry"	Advanced
Cortez Shaw	"Titanium"	Advanced

== Semifinals ==
The top 20 semifinalists performed in front of a live studio audience at Love by Cirque De Soleil at The Mirage in Las Vegas. The three-night event marked the first week viewers were allowed to cast votes. The women performed on the first night and the men on second night. On the third night, the show moved back to Los Angeles, and the top five men and top five women were announced. As each contestant walked out on stage, they performed their victory song. After the results were announced, Ryan Seacrest revealed that there would be a sing-off the next week between the sixth-place man and the sixth-place woman to determine who would be invited to join the top 10 on the 2013 summer.

Color key:

This contestant was chosen by the public and moved on to the live shows.
This contestant was eliminated.

Contestants are listed in the order they performed.

Female contestants (March 5)
Contestant	Song	Result
Zoanette Johnson	"What's Love Got to Do with It"	Eliminated
Breanna Steer	"Flaws and All"	Eliminated
Aubrey Cleland	"Big Girls Don't Cry"	Eliminated (6th place)
Janelle Arthur	"If I Can Dream"	Advanced
Tenna Torres	"Lost"	Eliminated
Angie Miller	"Never Gone"	Advanced
Amber Holcomb	"I Believe in You and Me"	Advanced
Kree Harrison	"Stronger"	Advanced
Adriana Latonio	"Stand Up for Love"	Eliminated
Candice Glover	"Ordinary People"	Advanced

Male contestants (March 6)
Contestant	Song	Result
Elijah Liu	"Stay"	Eliminated
Cortez Shaw	"Locked Out of Heaven"	Eliminated
Charlie Askew	"Mama"	Eliminated (6th place)
Nick Boddington	"Iris"	Eliminated
Burnell Taylor	"I'm Here"	Advanced
Paul Jolley	"Just a Fool"	Advanced
Lazaro Arbos	"Feeling Good"	Advanced
Curtis Finch, Jr.	"I Believe I Can Fly"	Advanced
Devin Velez	"Somos Novios (It's Impossible)"	Advanced
Vincent Powell	"End of the Road"	Eliminated

Aubrey Cleland and Charlie Askew each finished in sixth place, so they faced off against each other on March 14 to determine who would be invited to join the top 10 on the 2013 American Idol summer tour.

Victory songs
Contestant	Victory song
Paul Jolley	"Alone"
Burnell Taylor	"Ready for Love"
Curtis Finch, Jr.	"So High"
Devin Velez	"The Power of One (Change the World)"
Lazaro Arbos	"Bridge over Troubled Water"
Janelle Arthur	"Home"
Candice Glover	"I'm Going Down"
Angie Miller	"I Was Here"
Amber Holcomb	"I'm Every Woman"
Kree Harrison	"Evidence"

== Top 10 contestants ==
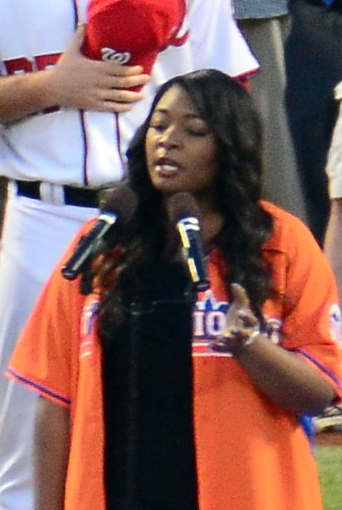
Candice Glover

- Candice Glover (born November 22, 1989) was from Beaufort, South Carolina. She auditioned in Charlotte with "Syrup & Honey". She had previously auditioned in the ninth and eleventh seasons. She performed Alicia Keys's "Girl on Fire" as her final solo in the Hollywood rounds and "(You Make Me Feel Like) A Natural Woman" at the sudden death round, where she received high praise from the judges. She performed "Ordinary People" at the semifinals.
- Kree Harrison (born May 17, 1990) was from Woodville, Texas. She auditioned in Oklahoma City. She performed "Sin Wagon" in Hollywood. Harrison performed "Stars" as her final solo in Hollywood, where she received praise from the judges. She then sang "Up to the Mountain (MLK Song)" in the sudden death round and "Stronger" at the semifinals.

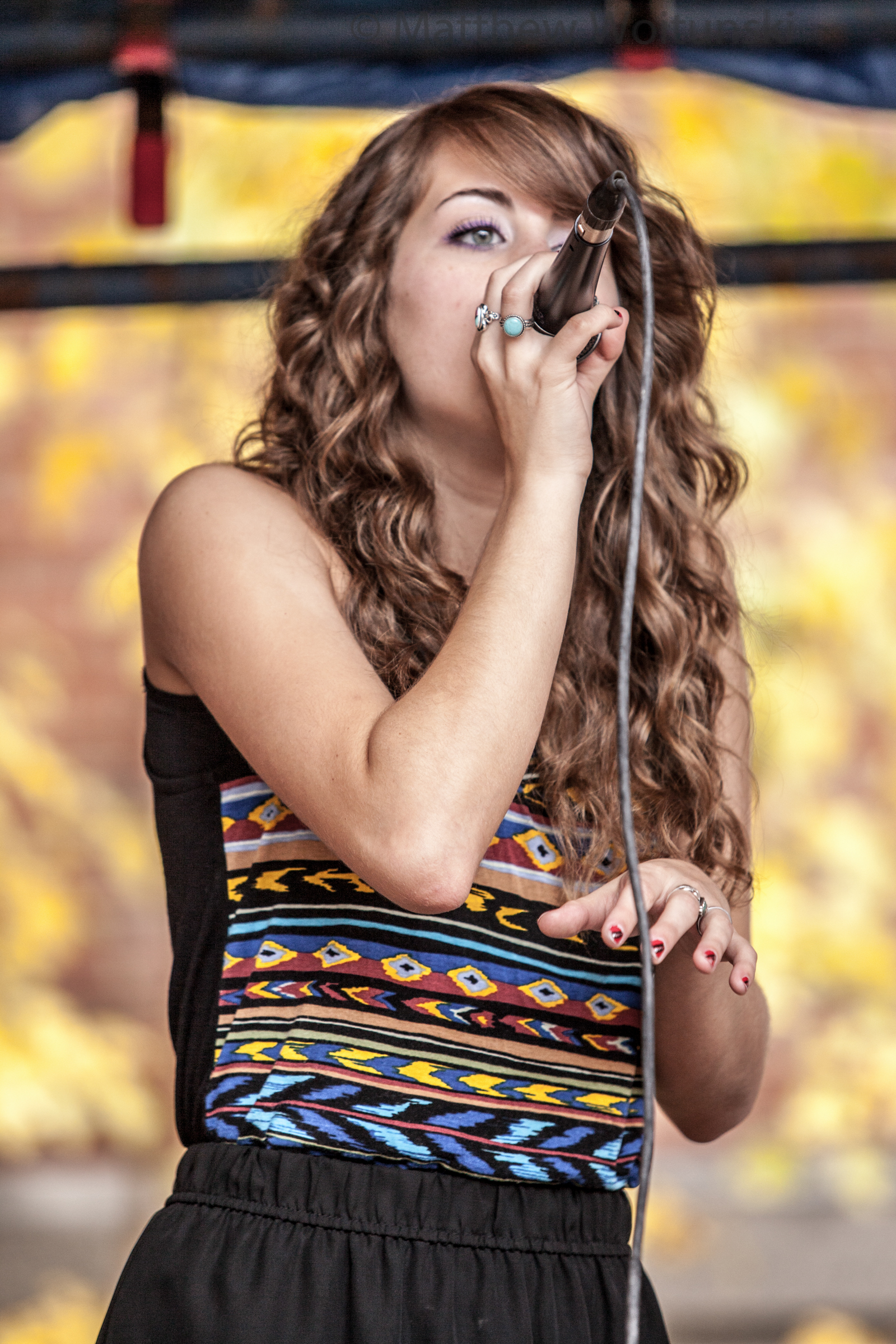
Angie Miller

- Angie Miller (born February 17, 1994) was from Beverly, Massachusetts. She auditioned in New York City with "Mamma Knows Best." She stated at her audition that she was partially deaf with twenty percent hearing loss in her right ear and forty percent in her left ear. Miller performed her original composition, "You Set Me Free," as her final solo in Hollywood, where she received a standing ovation from the judges. She sang Jessie J's "Nobody's Perfect" in Las Vegas and "Never Gone" at the semifinals.
- Amber Holcomb (born March 17, 1994) was from Houston, Texas. She had originally auditioned in the eleventh season, but was cut in the Las Vegas round. She performed "My Funny Valentine" in Las Vegas, where she received a standing ovation from the judges. Holcomb performed "I Believe in You and Me" at the semifinals, where she also received a standing ovation from the judges.
- Janelle Arthur (born December 12, 1989) was from Oliver Springs, Tennessee. She auditioned in Charlotte with "Where the Blacktop Ends". She had auditioned twice before, in the tenth and eleventh seasons. She performed "I Told You So" in Hollywood, "Just a Kiss" in Las Vegas, and "If I Can Dream" at the semifinals.
- Lazaro Arbos (born December 27, 1990) was originally from Cuba, but has lived in Naples, Florida, since he was ten years old. He auditioned in Chicago with "Bridge over Troubled Water". He sang "The Edge of Glory" in Hollywood as his final solo. He then performed "Tonight I Wanna Cry" in Las Vegas and "Feeling Good" at the semifinals.
- Burnell Taylor (born April 14, 1993) was from New Orleans, Louisiana. He auditioned in Baton Rouge with "I'm Here," where he received a standing ovation from the judges. He sang "Jar of Hearts" in Hollywood and "This Time" in Las Vegas.
- Devin Velez (born April 22, 1994) was from Chicago, Illinois, where also auditioned. He sang "What a Wonderful World" in Hollywood "Listen" in Las Vegas, and "Somos Novios (It's Impossible)" in the semifinals.
- Paul Jolley (born January 27, 1990) was from Palmersville, Tennessee. He auditioned in Baton Rouge with "I Won't Let Go". He sang Carrie Underwood's "Blown Away" in Hollywood, "Tonight I Wanna Cry" in Las Vegas, and "Just a Fool" in the semifinals.
- Curtis Finch, Jr. (born January 16, 1988) was from St. Louis, Missouri. He had previously auditioned in the fourth and eleventh seasons. He performed "Jar of Hearts" as his final solo in Hollywood and "Superstar" in Las Vegas. He performed "I Believe I Can Fly" in the semifinals.

== Finals ==
There were ten weeks of the finals and ten contestants competing. At least one contestant was eliminated every week based on the public's votes, although the judges could veto one elimination through the use of the "judges' save." The judges ultimately did not save anyone this season, and one week featured a non-elimination as a result.

Color key:

This contestant was saved by America's vote.
This contestant was in the top three.
This contestant was in the bottom two or three, but was saved by America's vote.
This contestant was eliminated.
This contestant won American Idol.
This contestant was the runner-up.

=== Top 10 – American Idols ===
Contestants performed one song each that had been performed by a previous winner of American Idol, and are listed in the order they performed.

Contestant	Song	American Idol	Result
Curtis Finch, Jr.	"I Believe"	Fantasia	Eliminated
Janelle Arthur	"Gone"	Scotty McCreery	Safe
Devin Velez	"Temporary Home"	Carrie Underwood	Bottom two
Angie Miller	"I Surrender"	Kelly Clarkson	Top three
Paul Jolley	"Amazed"	Scotty McCreery	Safe
Candice Glover	"I (Who Have Nothing)"	Jordin Sparks	Top three
Lazaro Arbos	"Breakaway"	Kelly Clarkson	Safe
Kree Harrison	"Crying"	Carrie Underwood	Top three
Burnell Taylor	"Flying Without Wings"	Ruben Studdard	Safe
Amber Holcomb	"A Moment Like This"	Kelly Clarkson	Safe

Non-competition performance
Performers	Song
Top 10	"Shine Your Way"
Bon Jovi	"Because We Can"
Phillip Phillips	"Gone, Gone, Gone"

Before the results were announced, Charlie Askew and Aubrey Cleland, who each finished in 6th place in the semifinals, were each given a chance to perform, vying for the opportunity to join the top 10 on the 2013 summer. The following week, it was announced that Aubrey Cleland won the sing-off and was invited to join the tour.

American Idol 2013 tour competition
Contestant	Song	Result
Charlie Askew	"Sky Blue Diamond"	Lost sing-off
Aubrey Cleland	"Out Here on My Own"	Won sing-off

=== Top 9 – The Beatles ===
Contestants performed one song each from the Beatles discography, and are listed in the order they performed.

Contestant	Beatles song	Result
Kree Harrison	"With a Little Help from My Friends"	Safe
Burnell Taylor	"Let It Be"	Safe
Amber Holcomb	"She's Leaving Home"	Bottom three
Lazaro Arbos	"In My Life"	Safe
Candice Glover	"Come Together"	Safe
Paul Jolley	"Eleanor Rigby"	Eliminated
Angie Miller	"Yesterday"	Safe
Devin Velez	"The Long and Winding Road"	Bottom three
Janelle Arthur	"I Will"	Safe

Non-competition performance
Performers	Song
Top 9 men	"Got to Get You into My Life"
Top 9 women	"Here, There and Everywhere"
Casey Abrams	"I Saw Her Standing There"
Jessica Sanchez, featuring Ne-Yo	"Tonight"

=== Top 8 – Motown ===
Smokey Robinson served as a guest mentor this week. Contestants performed two songs each: one solo and either one duet with a fellow contestant or one trio with two fellow contestants. Contestants are listed in the order they performed.

Contestant	Order	Motown song	Result
Candice Glover	1	"I Heard It Through the Grapevine"	Safe
Lazaro Arbos	3	"For Once in My Life"	Bottom three
Janelle Arthur	4	"You Keep Me Hangin' On"	Safe
Devin Velez	5	"The Tracks of My Tears"	Eliminated
Burnell Taylor	7	"My Cherie Amour"	Bottom three
Angie Miller	8	"Shop Around"	Safe
Amber Holcomb	9	"Lately"	Safe
Kree Harrison	11	"Don't Play That Song (You Lied)"	Safe
Janelle Arthur & Kree Harrison	2	"Like a Prayer"	
Candice Glover, Amber Holcomb & Angie Miller	6	"I'm Gonna Make You Love Me"	
Lazaro Arbos, Burnell Taylor & Devin Velez	10	"I Can't Help Myself (Sugar Pie Honey Bunch)"	

Non-competition performance
Performers	Song
Top 8	"Old Time Rock and Roll"
Colton Dixon	"Love Has Come For Me"
Katharine McPhee with OneRepublic	"If I Lose Myself"
Keith Urban	"Long Hot Summer"

=== Top 7 – Rock music ===
Contestants performed two songs each: one solo and either one duet with a fellow contestant or one trio with two fellow contestants. Ballads were not permitted this week. Contestants are listed in the order they performed.

Contestant	Order	Rock song	Result
Burnell Taylor	1	"You Give Love a Bad Name"	Eliminated
Kree Harrison	3	"Piece of My Heart"	Top three
Janelle Arthur	5	"You May Be Right"	Bottom two
Lazaro Arbos	6	"We Are the Champions"	Top three
Candice Glover	8	"(I Can't Get No) Satisfaction"	Safe
Amber Holcomb	9	"What About Love"	Safe
Angie Miller	10	"Bring Me to Life"	Top three
Lazaro Arbos & Angie Miller	2	"Crazy Little Thing Called Love"	
Candice Glover & Burnell Taylor	4	"The Letter"	
Janelle Arthur, Kree Harrison & Amber Holcomb	7	"It's Still Rock and Roll to Me"	

Non-competition performance
Performers	Song
Top 7	"Somebody to Love"
Casey James	"The Good Life"
Carrie Underwood	"See You Again"

=== Top 6 – Burt Bacharach/Hal David & songs the contestants wish they'd written ===
Each contestant performed two songs, one of which was written by Burt Bacharach and Hal David.

Contestant	Order	Song	Result
Angie Miller	1	"Anyone Who Had a Heart"	Safe
Angie Miller	7	"Love Came Down"	Safe
Amber Holcomb	2	"I Say a Little Prayer"	Safe
Amber Holcomb	8	"Love On Top"	Safe
Lazaro Arbos	3	"(They Long to Be) Close to You"	Eliminated
Lazaro Arbos	9	"Angels"	Eliminated
Kree Harrison	4	"What the World Needs Now Is Love"	Top two
Kree Harrison	10	"Help Me Make It Through the Night"	Top two
Janelle Arthur	5	"I'll Never Fall in Love Again"	Safe
Janelle Arthur	11	"The Dance"	Safe
Candice Glover	6	"Don't Make Me Over"	Top two
Candice Glover	12	"Lovesong"	Top two

Non-competition performance
Performers	Song
Top 6	"You'll Never Get to Heaven (If You Break My Heart)" "I Just Don't Know What to Do with Myself" "(There's) Always Something There to Remind Me" "This Girl's in Love with You" "One Less Bell to Answer" "A House Is Not a Home" "That’s What Friends Are For"
Scotty McCreery	"See You Tonight"
Kelly Clarkson	"People Like Us"

=== Top 5 – Contestants' birth year & divas ===
Each contestant performed two songs: one released the year they were born, and one from a diva. Contestants are listed in the order they performed.

Contestant	Order	Song	Birth year	Diva	Result
Candice Glover	1	"Straight Up"	1989	Mariah Carey & Whitney Houston	Safe
Candice Glover	6	"When You Believe"	1989	Mariah Carey & Whitney Houston	Safe
Janelle Arthur	2	"When I Call Your Name"	1989	Dolly Parton	Eliminated
Janelle Arthur	7	"Dumb Blonde"	1989	Dolly Parton	Eliminated
Kree Harrison	3	"She Talks to Angels"	1990	Céline Dion	Safe
Kree Harrison	8	"Have You Ever Been in Love"	1990	Céline Dion	Safe
Angie Miller	4	"I'll Stand by You"	1994	Beyoncé	Safe
Angie Miller	9	"Halo"	1994	Beyoncé	Safe
Amber Holcomb	5	"Without You"	1994	Barbra Streisand	Safe
Amber Holcomb	10	"What Are You Doing the Rest of Your Life?"	1994	Barbra Streisand	Safe

Non-competition performance
Performers	Song
Top 5	"Last Dance" "Heaven Knows" "Dim All the Lights" "She Works Hard for the Money"
Clay Aiken	"Bridge over Troubled Water"
Fantasia	"Lose to Win"

=== Top 4 (April 25) ===
Each contestant performed three songs: two solos and one duet with a fellow contestant. Contestants are listed in the order they performed. There was no elimination this week, because the judges had not used their "judges' save" before it expired. The votes cast for this week were combined with the following week's votes.

Contestant	Order	1980s song	Result
Amber Holcomb	1	"The Power of Love"	Bottom two
Amber Holcomb	7	"MacArthur Park"	Bottom two
Candice Glover	2	"Find Your Love"	Bottom two
Candice Glover	8	"Emotion"	Bottom two
Kree Harrison	3	"It Hurt So Bad"	Safe
Kree Harrison	9	"A Whiter Shade of Pale"	Safe
Angie Miller	4	"Who You Are"	Safe
Angie Miller	10	"Cry Me a River"	Safe
Kree Harrison & Amber Holcomb	5	"Rumour Has It"	
Candice Glover & Angie Miller	6	"Stay"	

Non-competition performance
Performers	Song
Top 4	"Girl on Fire"
Stefano Langone	"Yes to Love"
Lee DeWyze	"Silver Lining"

=== Top 4 (May 2) – Music from now & then ===
Harry Connick, Jr. served as a guest mentor this week. Each contestant performed three songs: one hit song from 2013, one song from the Great American Songbook, and one song with all four contestants. Contestants are listed in the order they performed.

Contestant	Order	Song	Result
Angie Miller	1	"Diamonds"	Safe
Angie Miller	5	"Someone to Watch Over Me"	Safe
Amber Holcomb	2	"Just Give Me a Reason"	Eliminated
Amber Holcomb	6	"My Funny Valentine"	Eliminated
Candice Glover	3	"When I Was Your Man"	Safe
Candice Glover	7	"You've Changed"	Safe
Kree Harrison	4	"See You Again"	Safe
Kree Harrison	8	"Stormy Weather"	Safe
Candice Glover, Kree Harrison, Amber Holcomb & Angie Miller	9	"Wings"	

Non-competition performance
Performers	Song
Top 4	"Crazy in Love"
David Cook	"Laying Me Low"
will.i.am	"Bang Bang"
Harry Connick, Jr.	"Every Man Should Know"

=== Top 3 ===
Each contestant performed three songs: one chosen by mentor Jimmy Iovine, one chosen by the judges, and one chosen by the producers. Contestants are listed in the order they performed.

Contestant	Order	Song	Result
Kree Harrison	1	"Fuckin' Perfect" (Note: Song chosen by Jimmy Iovine.)	Safe
Kree Harrison	6	"Here Comes Goodbye"	Safe
Kree Harrison	8	"Better Dig Two"	Safe
Candice Glover	2	"One"	Safe
Candice Glover	4	"Next to Me"	Safe
Candice Glover	9	"Somewhere"	Safe
Angie Miller	3	"Sorry Seems to Be the Hardest Word"	Eliminated
Angie Miller	5	"Try"	Eliminated
Angie Miller	7	"Maybe"	Eliminated

Non-competition performance
Performers	Song
Top 3	"Who Says"
Lauren Alaina	"Barefoot and Buckwild"
Mariah Carey, featuring Miguel	"#Beautiful"
Alicia Keys	"Tears Always Win"

=== Top 2 – Finale ===
Each contestant performed three songs, one of which was chosen by producer Simon Fuller, and are listed in the order they performed.

Contestant	Order	Song	Result
Kree Harrison	1	"Angel" (Note: Song chosen by Simon Fuller.)	Runner-up
Kree Harrison	3	"All Cried Out"	Runner-up
Kree Harrison	5	"Up to the Mountain (MLK Song)"	Runner-up
Candice Glover	2	"Chasing Pavements"	Winner
Candice Glover	4	"I Am Beautiful"	Winner
Candice Glover	6	"I (Who Have Nothing)"	Winner

Non-competition performance
Performers	Song
Carly Rae Jepsen	"Take a Picture" (Note: Performed on the May 15 episode.)
Top 10	"Glad You Came"
Janelle Arthur with The Band Perry	"Done"
Curtis Finch, Jr., Paul Jolley, Devin Velez, Burnell Taylor & Lazaro Arbos	"Let's Hang On!" "Walk Like a Man" "Who Loves You"
Curtis Finch, Jr., Paul Jolley, Devin Velez, Burnell Taylor & Lazaro Arbos with Frankie Valli	"Can't Take My Eyes Off You" "Grease"
Mariah Carey & Randy Jackson	"Vision of Love" "Make It Happen" "My All" "Hero" "We Belong Together" "#Beautiful"
Amber Holcomb with Emeli Sandé	"Next to Me"
Psy	"Gentleman"
Keith Urban	"Little Bit of Everything"
Candice Glover with Jennifer Hudson	"Inseparable"
Angie Miller with Adam Lambert	"Titanium"
Angie Miller with Jessie J	"Domino"
Kree Harrison with Travis Barker, Randy Jackson & Keith Urban	"Where the Blacktop Ends"
Janelle Arthur, Amber Holcomb, Angie Miller, Kree Harrison & Candice Glover with Aretha Franklin	"(You Make Me Feel Like) A Natural Woman" "I Never Loved a Man (The Way I Love You)" "Respect" "Think"
Jennifer Lopez & Pitbull	"Live It Up"
Candice Glover & Kree Harrison	"One Less Bell to Answer" "A House Is Not a Home"
Candice Glover	"I Am Beautiful"

== Elimination chart ==
Color key:

Winner
Runner-up
Did not perform
Saved by the public
Top two or three
Bottom two or three
Eliminated

American Idol (season 12) - Eliminations
Contestant	Pl.	Top 20	Sing–off	Top 10	Top 9	Top 8	Top 7	Top 6	Top 5	Top 4 (Note: The week of April 25 featured a non-elimination round. Votes from that week were carried over to the next week.)		Top 3	Finale
Contestant	Pl.	3/7	3/14		3/21	3/28	4/4	4/11	4/18	4/25	5/2	5/9	5/16
Candice Glover	1	Safe	N/A	Top three	Safe	Safe	Safe	Top two	Safe	Bottom two	Safe	Safe	Winner
Kree Harrison	2	Safe	N/A	Top three	Safe	Safe	Top three	Top two	Bottom two	Safe	Safe	Safe	Runner-up
Angie Miller	3	Safe	N/A	Top three	Safe	Safe	Top three	Safe	Safe	Safe	Safe	Eliminated	
Amber Holcomb	4	Safe	N/A	Safe	Bottom three	Safe	Safe	Bottom two	Safe	Bottom two	Eliminated		
Janelle Arthur	5	Safe	N/A	Safe	Safe	Safe	Bottom two	Safe	Eliminated				
Lazaro Arbos	6	Safe	N/A	Safe	Safe	Bottom three	Top three	Eliminated					
Burnell Taylor	7	Safe	N/A	Safe	Safe	Bottom three	Eliminated						
Devin Velez	8	Safe	N/A	Bottom two	Bottom three	Eliminated							
Paul Jolley	9	Safe	N/A	Safe	Eliminated								
Curtis Finch, Jr.	10	Safe	N/A	Eliminated									
Aubrey Cleland		Eliminated	Won sing-off (Note: Aubrey Cleland and Charlie Askew faced off to determine who would be invited to join the top 10 finalists on the summer tour. Aubrey won this sing-off.)										
Charlie Askew		Eliminated	Lost sing-off										
Nick Boddington		Eliminated											
Zoanette Johnson		Eliminated											
Adriana Latonio		Eliminated											
Elijah Liu		Eliminated											
Vincent Powell		Eliminated											
Cortez Shaw		Eliminated											
Breanna Steer		Eliminated											
Tenna Torres		Eliminated											

== Mariah Carey–Nicki Minaj feud ==
A video was leaked to TMZ in October 2012 which showed Nicki Minaj erupting in a tirade against Mariah Carey during the audition in Charlotte, North Carolina. It was also claimed that Minaj was heard saying off-camera, "If I had a gun, I would shoot that bitch." Minaj, however, denied that she had made the threat. Ryan Seacrest said that the dispute "went a little too far," while Keith Urban jokingly said "I was the UN," and the feud elicited a comment from President Barack Obama that Carey and Minaj would "sort it out." In an interview with Barbara Walters on The View that aired on January 7, 2013, Carey said that due to Minaj's threats, it "felt like an unsafe work environment," and claimed that she had enhanced her personal security. Minaj stated that Barbara Walters never attempted to contact her for any comment regarding her side of the story. Carey also said that she has since made up with Minaj. Carey's then-husband Nick Cannon claimed that the feud was used by American Idol producers to generate interest and ratings. Producer Nigel Lythgoe, however, denied that he was responsible for leaking the video or that it was a publicity stunt, and said that he had no plans to use the footage in advance of or during the season. Fox executive Mike Darnell described the buzz due to the feud as being great. The aired episode of the Charlotte audition did not show the tirade and what was shown appeared to have no real linear connection with the leaked footage.

In April 2013, Carey noted during an episode of American Idol that Minaj had not had a number-one song on the US Billboard Hot 100. The next day, Minaj took to Twitter to post what have been described as "extremely harsh" insults against Carey. She labeled the singer "insecure" and "bitter," while also referencing a widely spread rumor that the producers of American Idol wanted to bring Jennifer Lopez back to the judges panel after a significant decline in ratings this season. "All dem #1s but JLo phone ringin? Lol. I guess having a personality, being a secure woman, and giving genuine critique still trumps that," Minaj tweeted. In November 2013, Carey stated that "American Idol was like going to work every day in hell with Satan."

== U.S. Nielsen ratings ==
The Wednesday episodes had an average viewer number of 15.04 million with a 4.6 rating in the 18/49 demo, while the Thursday episodes had an average viewer number of 14.64 million and a 4.3 in 18/49 demo. The average figure represents a 23% drop from the previous year.

Episode list

Show	Episode	Air date	Ratings	Share	Rating/share 18–49	Viewers (millions)	Weekly rank	Note
1	"New York City Auditions"	January 16, 2013	10.2	15	6.0/16	17.93	4	
2	"Chicago Auditions"	January 17, 2013	9.2	14	5.6/15	16.28	6	
3	"Charlotte Auditions"	January 23, 2013	9.3	14	5.5/15	16.07	1	
4	"New Orleans Auditions"	January 24, 2013	8.7	13	5.2/14	15.65	2	
5	"San Antonio and Los Angeles Auditions"	January 30, 2013	9.2	14	5.5/15	15.78	7	
6	"Oklahoma City Auditions"	January 31, 2013	7.9	12	4.5/13	13.80	9	
7	"Hollywood Round, Part 1"	February 6, 2013	8.4	13	4.6/13	14.27	6	
8	"Hollywood Round, Part 2"	February 7, 2013	7.7	12	4.1/12	13.28	8	
9	"Hollywood Round, Part 3"	February 13, 2013	7.9	12	4.3/12	13.45	4	
10	"Hollywood Round, Part 4"	February 14, 2013	7.4	12	3.7/12	12.59	5	
11	"Las Vegas, Girls Perform"	February 20, 2013	8.5	13	4.1/11	14.37	7	
12	"Las Vegas, Guys Perform"	February 21, 2013	7.9	12	3.9/10	13.66	9	
13	"Las Vegas, Girls Perform 2"	February 27, 2013	7.9	12	3.9/11	13.30	3	
14	"Las Vegas, Guys Perform 2"	February 28, 2013	7.5	12	3.8/11	12.56	4	
15	"Semifinalists Girls Perform"	March 5, 2013	6.9	10	3.5/10	11.72	8	
16	"Semifinalists Boys Perform"	March 6, 2013	7.6	12	3.8/10	12.84	7	
17	"Finalists Chosen"	March 7, 2013	7.7	12	3.6/10	13.12	6	
18	"Top 10 Perform"	March 13, 2013	8.0	13	3.8/10	13.44	3	
19	"Top 10 Results"	March 14, 2013	6.9	12	3.1/10	11.93	8	
20	"Top 9 Perform"	March 20, 2013	7.7	12	3.6/10	12.94	4	
21	"Top 9 Results"	March 21, 2013	7.3	12	2.9/9	11.65	5	
22	"Top 8 Perform"	March 27, 2013	7.4	12	3.2/9	12.33	7	
23	"Top 8 Results"	March 28, 2013	6.8	12	2.8/9	11.43	9	
24	"Top 7 Perform"	April 3, 2013	7.0	11	3.1/9	11.76	12	
25	"Top 7 Results"	April 4, 2013	7.0	11	2.9/9	11.72	13	
26	"Top 6 Perform"	April 10, 2013	7.4	12	3.2/9	12.23	9	
27	"Top 6 Results"	April 11, 2013	7.7	13	3.2/10	13.19	6	
28	"Top 5 Perform"	April 17, 2013	7.5	12	3.4/10	12.71	5	
29	"Top 5 Results"	April 18, 2013	7.5	12	3.0/10	12.42	7	
30	"Top 4 Perform"	April 24, 2013	7.5	12	3.3/9	12.46	9	
31	"Top 4 Results"	April 25, 2013	6.9	12	2.8/9	11.40	12	
32	"Top 4 Redux Perform"	May 1, 2013	7.1	12	2.9/9	11.08	10	
33	"Top 4 Redux Results"	May 2, 2013	6.8	11	2.6/9	11.27	9	
34	"Top 3 Perform"	May 8, 2013	6.7	11	2.9/8	11.11	10	
35	"Top 3 Results"	May 9, 2013	7.0	12	2.9/9	11.57	8	
36	"Top 2 Perform"	May 15, 2013	7.2	12	3.0/10	12.11	6	
37	"Finale"	May 16, 2013	8.3	14	3.6/11	14.31	3	
