= All Cried Out (Kree Harrison song) =

Single by Kree Harrison
- Released: May 16, 2013
- Recorded: 2013
- Genre: Country
- Length: 3:08
- Label: 19
- Songwriters: Katrina Elam, Steve McEwan, Gordie Sampson
- Producer: Unknown

"All Cried Out" is the debut single from American recording artist and American Idol season 12 runner-up, Kree Harrison. The song was co-written by Katrina Elam, Steve McEwan, and Gordie Sampson.

Harrison first performed the song, her potential coronation song had she won the title, on the season's final performance night on May 15, 2013. Her recording of "All Cried Out" was released as a single on May 16, 2013.

== Critical reception ==
Billy Dukes of Taste of Country gave the song two and a half stars out of five, writing that "the ballad is a showcase for her vocal range and power, but it’s never made clear why the Texan is so bummed." Matt Bjorke of Roughstock gave the song a favorable review, saying that Harrison "has hints of Martina McBride and Carrie Underwood in her phrasing and vocal runs" and "should be able to compete with any and all of the top stars of the mainstream country music format."

== Track listing ==
Digital download
No.	Title	Length
1.	"All Cried Out"	3:08

== Chart performance ==
The song sold 24,000 copies in its debut week, and it reached No. 34 in the Hot Country Songs chart and No. 85 in the Hot Digital Songs chart. It reached No.22 on the Country Digital songs, but dropped out of Top 50 the next week with 9,188 copies sold totaling 33,513 sold in 2 weeks.

Chart (2013)	Peak position
US Country Songs (Billboard)	34

== Release history ==
Country	Date	Format	Label
United States	May 16, 2013	Digital download	19 Recordings, Inc
