= Anberlin discography =

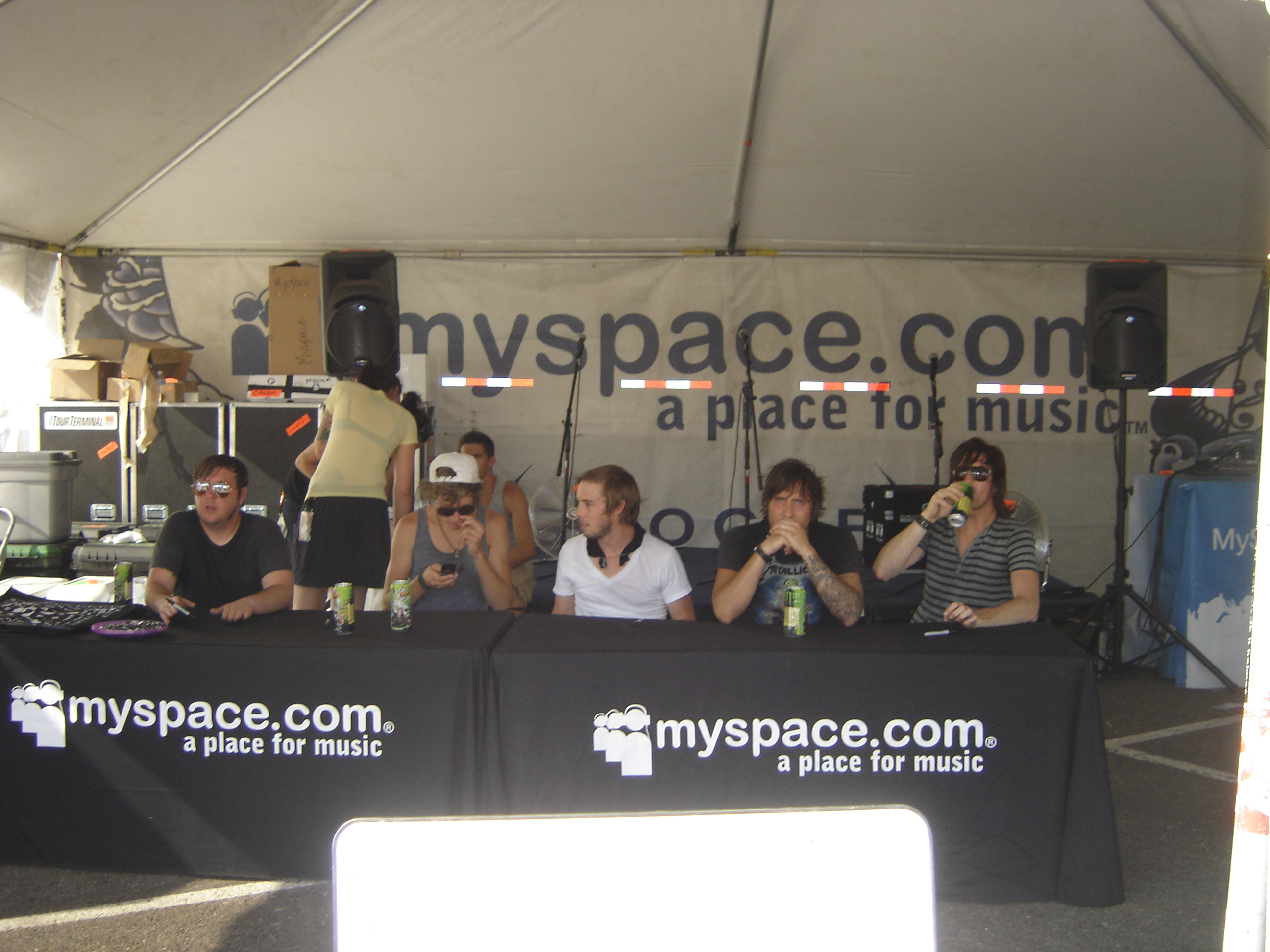
- Anberlin before an autograph session in Phoenix, AZ on July 12, 2007.
- Studio albums: 9
- Extended plays: 2
- Live albums: 2
- Compilation albums: 2
- Singles: 19
- Music videos: 18

The discography of Anberlin, an American alternative rock band, consists of nine studio albums, two extended plays, one compilation album and seven singles. Prior to the release of their fourth studio album, Anberlin had sold over 400,000 albums.

Anberlin's first studio album, Blueprints for the Black Market (2003), was the first of three to be released on Tooth & Nail Records. The album's lead single "Readyfuels" spurred the album's sales upwards of 60,000 copies, but the album failed to feature on any national charts. The band's second album, Never Take Friendship Personal (2005), peaked at No. 144 on the Billboard 200 and No. 3 on the Top Heatseekers chart. Anberlin's first single to feature on a national chart came from the album, with "Paperthin Hymn" peaking at No. 38 on the Alternative Songs chart. The album went on to sell over 150,000 copies, surpassing the previous album and their eventuating third album.

In December 2006, Anberlin released the Godspeed EP, featuring the upcoming third album's lead single "Godspeed". Their third album, Cities, was released in early 2007, peaking at No. 19 on the Billboard 200 and selling in excess of 100,000 copies. Following the album's success, the band announced they had signed with major record label Universal Republic. Their final release on Tooth & Nail Records was Lost Songs, a compilation album of B-sides, demos, acoustics and covers.

Anberlin released their fourth studio album and first on a major label, in September 2008. New Surrender peaked at No. 13 on the Billboard 200, the band's highest chart performance. The first single from the album was a re-recording of "Feel Good Drag", which was originally from Never Take Friendship Personal. It claimed No. 1 on the Alternative Songs chart, after a record 29 weeks in the chart.

== Studio albums ==
Year	Album details	Peak chart positions							
Year	Album details	US	US Digital	US Rock	US Alt.	US Christian	US Heat.	US Taste.	AUS
2003	Blueprints for the Black Market: Released: May 6, 2003; Label: Tooth & Nail (TND 41995); Format: CD, LP	—	—	—	—	—	—	—	—
2005	Never Take Friendship Personal: Released: February 1, 2005; Label: Tooth & Nail (TND 66607); Format: CD, LP	144	—	—	—	5	3	—	—
2007	Cities: Released: February 20, 2007; Label: Tooth & Nail (TND 84730); Formats: CD (+DVD), 2×LP	19	19	6	—	2	—	11	59
2008	New Surrender: Released: September 30, 2008; Label: Universal Republic (001171002); Formats: CD (+DVD), 2×LP, digital download, Memory Stick	13	13	5	5	1	—	7	85
2010	Dark Is the Way, Light Is a Place: Released: September 7, 2010; Label: Universal Republic; Formats: CD (+DVD), LP, digital download	9	2	4	4	1	—	9	41
2012	Vital: Released: October 16, 2012; Label: Universal Republic; Format: CD (+DVD), 2×LP (10"), digital download	16	9	6	3	1	—	22	45
2014	Lowborn: Released: July 22, 2014; Label: Tooth & Nail; Format: CD, LP, digital download	10	10	2	1	1	—	—	32
2024	Vega: Released: August 2, 2024; Label: Equal Vision; Formats: CD, LP, digital download	—	—	—	—	—	—	—	—
2026	Currency: Released: November 11, 2026; Label: Equal Vision; Formats: CD, LP, digital download	—	—	—	—	—	—	—	—
"—" denotes releases that did not chart or were not released in that country.

== Compilation albums ==
Year	Album details
2007	Lost Songs: Released: November 20, 2007; Label: Tooth & Nail (TND07377); Formats: CD, album, digital download
2009	Blueprints for City Friendships: The Anberlin Anthology: Released: November 17, 2009; Label: Tooth & Nail; Formats: CD, album, digital download; Contents: Blueprints for the Black Market, Never Take Friendship Personal, and Cities.
2012	Dancing Between the Fibers of Time: Released: March 26, 2012; Label: Tooth & Nail; Formats: CD, album, digital download
2013	Best of Anberlin: Released: 2013; Label: Capitol Records, Tooth & Nail Records; Format: CD, Digital download
2013	Devotion: Released: October 15, 2013; Label: Big3; Format: CD, digital download; Details: Vital: Special Edition

== Live albums ==
Year	Album details
2009	Live from the PureVolume House: Released: June 15, 2009
2011	Live from House of Blues Anaheim: Released: 2011
2013	Live from Williamsburg: Released: October 15, 2013
2015	Never Take Friendship Personal: Live in New York City: Released: May 5, 2015
2015	Cities: Live in New York City: Released: July 24, 2015
2020	We Are The Lost Ones: Released: November, 2020
2020	Tear Us Apart: Released: December 11, 2020
2021	More To Living Than Being Alive: Released: February 19, 2021
2021	Paper Tigers: Released: April 23, 2021
2021	As You Found Me: Released: July 23, 2021
2021	Heavy Lies The Crown: Released: November, 2021
2021	Under a Dying Sun: Released: December, 2021

== Extended plays ==
Year	EP details
2006	Godspeed EP: Released: December 26, 2006; Label: Tooth & Nail
2012	Type Three: Released: October 24, 2012; Label: self-released
2022	Silverline: Released: July 29, 2022; Label: Equal Vision
2023	Convinced: Released: June 30, 2023; Label: Equal Vision

== Singles ==
Year	Song	Peak chart positions			Album	Certifications
Year	Song	US	US Alt.	US Rock	Album	Certifications
2003	"Readyfuels"	×	×	×	Blueprints for the Black Market	
2003	"Change the World (Lost Ones)"	×	×	×	Blueprints for the Black Market	
2005	"A Day Late"	×	×	×	Never Take Friendship Personal	
2006	"Paperthin Hymn"	×	38	×	Never Take Friendship Personal	
2006	"Godspeed"	×	—	×	Cities	
2007	"The Unwinding Cable Car"	×	—	×	Cities	
2008	"Feel Good Drag"	—^{[A]}	1	8	New Surrender	RIAA: Gold
2009	"Breaking"	×	23	37	New Surrender	
2009	"True Faith"	×	35	—	New Surrender	
2010	"Impossible"	×	5	14	Dark Is the Way, Light Is a Place	
2010	"We Owe This to Ourselves"	×	—	×	Dark Is the Way, Light Is a Place	
2011	"Closer"	×	39	×	Dark Is the Way, Light Is a Place	
2012	"Someone Anyone"	×	34	×	Vital	
2012	"Self-Starter"	×	×	×	Vital	
2013	"Unstable"	×	×	×	Vital	
2013	"City Electric"	×	×	×	Devotion	
2014	"Stranger Ways"	×	×	×	Lowborn	
2014	"Harbinger"	×	×	×	Lowborn	
2021	"Two Graves"	×	×	×	Vega	
2022	"Circles"	×	×	×	Vega	
2023	"Lacerate"	×	×	×	Vega	
2024	"Walk Alone"	×	×	×	Vega	
2024	"Seven"	×	×	×	Vega	
2024	"High Stakes"	×	×	×	Currency	
2025	"Ready Fuels"	×	×	×	Non-album single	
2026	"Neverafter"	×	×	×	Currency	
2026	"Gravity"	×	×	×	Currency	
2026	"Trenches"	×	×	×	Currency	
"—" denotes releases that did not chart or were not released in that country.

Notes

- A"Feel Good Drag" did not enter the Billboard Hot 100, but peaked at number eight on the Bubbling Under Hot 100 Singles chart, which acts as a 25-song extension to the Hot 100.

== Music videos ==
Year	Song	Director
2004	"Readyfuels"	
2005	"A Day Late"	Acquastrada^{[A]}
2006	"Paperthin Hymn"	Christopher Sims
2007	"Godspeed"	Christopher Sims
2007	"The Unwinding Cable Car"	Andrew Watson
2008	"Feel Good Drag"	Steven Hoover
2010	"Impossible"	Steven Hoover
2010	"We Owe This to Ourselves"	Steven Hoover
2013	"Unstable"	Stephanie Jainx
2013	"Dead American"	Nate Young
2014	"Stranger Ways"	Daniel Davenson
2014	"We Are Destroyer"	Zak Forrest
2022	"Circles"	Nate Young
2022	"Two Graves"	
2023	"Lacerate"	Victor Maldonado
2024	"Walk Alone"	Nate Young
2024	"Seven"	Nate Young
2024	"High Stakes"	Nate Young and Jacob Moniz
2025	"A Day Late'25"	Nate Young and Jacob Moniz
2026	"Neverafter"	Nate Young and Jacob Moniz

Notes

- A Acquastrada was a music video directing company.

== Other appearances ==
Year	Song contributed	Album
2005	"Baby Please Come Home" (Darlene Love cover)	Happy Christmas Vol. 4
2005	"Like a Rolling Stone" (Bob Dylan cover)	Listen to Bob Dylan: A Tribute
2006	"Enjoy the Silence" (Depeche Mode cover)	Punk Goes 90's
