= New Surrender =

Studio album by Anberlin
- Released: September 30, 2008
- Recorded: February–May 2008
- Studios: NRG Recording Studios, North Hollywood, California
- Genres: Alternative rock; emo
- Length: 45:04
- Label: Universal Republic
- Producer: Neal Avron

Anberlin chronology
Lost Songs (2007)	New Surrender (2008)	Dark is the Way, Light is a Place (2010)

Singles from New Surrender
- 1. "Feel Good Drag" Released: August 18, 2008; 2. "Breaking" Released: June 29, 2009; 3. "True Faith" Released: September 1, 2009 (Digital) (Deluxe edition re-release)

New Surrender is the fourth studio album by American alternative rock band Anberlin, released on September 30, 2008. It is the band's first album on a major label, after signing with Universal Republic Records on August 16, 2007. The album peaked at number 13 on the Billboard 200 and 5 on the Billboard Top Modern Rock / Alternative Albums chart.

Anberlin went in to record their fourth album only twelve months after the 2007 release of their third, Cities. The album was recorded at NRG Recording Studios in North Hollywood, California, in early 2008 by producer Neal Avron. The first single from the album, "Feel Good Drag" was originally set to be released to radio prior to the album on August 18, 2008, but was pushed back to August 26.

== Production ==
=== Background ===
Anberlin set about doing two weeks of pre-production for New Surrender, a significant amount more than the four days they did with Cities. Guitarist Joseph Milligan said the pre-production comprised them "playing in a room, playing all the new songs together and working on parts together. We would tweak things here and there." He also said the extra time allowed more input from the other band members, "everybody tossed in ideas. It was something we had never really had before. It was definitely a group effort." The two weeks enabled Milligan and fellow guitarist Christian McAlhaney to weed down the original 24 songs they had, to just 17, before moving into the studio and tracking 15.

=== Writing and recording ===
Vocalist and lyricist Stephen Christian, said that he wrote a portion of the fourth album while on a trip to New Orleans, at a small cafe named Kahve. Christian said "the pressures were immense" after signing with Universal, and that he had a "minor breakdown" leading him to "run away to New Orleans" in February to write a couple of songs for the record. Reminiscing over the experience he added, "the songs that came from the trip, inspired by New Orleans, are like none other before".

In an interview with Hurley Blog, Stephen Christian stated his top five lyrical influences for the album have been: "1. The war (in Iraq) 2. Revelations/conspiracy theories 3. Recent news that one of our close friends has been diagnosed with what could be a terminal disease 4. My time spent in New Orleans 5. My current relationship." Rhythm guitarist Christian McAlhaney has made his debut as a songwriter on the album; Stephen Christian said "He is an incredible counterpoint to Joseph Milligan and has written several songs that are going to be on this record!.".

After years of work with friend and producer Aaron Sprinkle, the band opted for change and along with Universal Republic, selected notable producer Neal Avron. Avron has been involved in the genre for years, producing albums for Yellowcard, New Found Glory and Fall Out Boy. The band completed pre-production on February 11–29, 2008, cutting down from the original 26 songs to just 15, incidentally by turning four songs into a single one.

"We will all come to the point in our life where we have to admit that we feel defeated, that something has conquered us. We must change, not because we want to, but because we desperately have to. We can not take life in its current suffocating state, even to admit such desperation shows that we are feeling deserted, wandering the barren desert, a shell of our former selves. It is only up from here, it is impossible to sink any lower into ourselves or our circumstances. But we can be salvaged, a deliverance. No vice can stand, no fix can take. The thorn in the side can be removed, but you have to be willing to admit and surrender. Surrender your habits, your lifestyle, your past, your present, and your future. This is your new surrender. The new surrender. New Surrender."

— Stephen Christian, Anberlin lyricist and vocalist, on the title New Surrender

The actual recording and production took place at multiple studios in Hollywood, California, under Avron throughout March and early April 2008. The first recording took place at Swing House Recordings in West Hollywood, followed by NRG Recording Studios in North Hollywood, where they completed at lot of the drum tracks and began the bass and guitar tracks. Finally they completed recording at The Boat Studio in Silver Lake, where the main focus was the vocals.

The band stated in a webchat session with AbsolutePunk.net that they would be using a wide range of instruments including the sitar, this claim was later declared as a joke, with Joseph Milligan saying, "It was a joke! There’s no sitar! Now I kind of wish there was so that we could actually say that!"

=== Title ===
The album's mysterious title has been explained multiple times by Anberlin's lyricist Christian. He has said the title explains people's need to give things up to change, "In everybody's life, there's something they know they have to give up... There's something they have to change or take care of in their lives to progress to the next step." His original explanation on the band's Myspace blog quickly spread across music news sites, with them reporting his insight on the title and how "we must change, not because we want to, but because we desperately have to."

Christian alluded to the title's power, "I think it's a motivational speech, in two words... Hopefully, [New Surrender] is that motivational speech in 40 minutes."

== Promotion ==
A pre-order for the upcoming album was available throughout the 2008 Warped Tour in the US. Anberlin was showcasing their new material on the main stage for the entire tour, with the pre-order coming with a USB device on a wristband. The USB contained a direct link to a digital download of the album, available on the release date September 30, 2008. The USB also had four exclusive tracks, including an alternate acoustic remix of "Breaking", and remixes of "Hello Alone", "The Unwinding Cable Car" and "The Feel Good Drag".

In response to some fans who claimed Anberlin was selling out, the band members released a music video called "Compound Lockdown". Christian McAlhaney introduced the video by saying that Anberlin "likes money a lot" and was going in a different direction, more towards a "hip-hop, thug rap, dirty south kind of thing". The song "Drop Dat (Did You?)" comes on next, displaying Stephen Christian and the members of Anberlin, accompanied by Vic Fuentes of Pierce the Veil and members of Four Year Strong, rapping to the song. This, of course, is meant to be taken lightly as a joke.

== Reception ==
=== Critical response ===
Professional ratings
Review scores
Source	Rating
About.com	3.5/5 stars
AbsolutePunk	79%
AllMusic	4.5/5 stars
Alternative Press	3/5 stars
CCM Magazine	5/5 stars
Christianity Today	4.5/5 stars
Cross Rhythms	10/10 squares
Jesus Freak Hideout	4/5 stars
Melodic	3.5/5 stars
Patrol Magazine	7.1/10
The Phantom Tollbooth	4/5 stars

New Surrender received critical acclaim from critics. AllMusic's Jared Johnson gave the album 4.5/5, calling New Surrender Anberlin's "best sense of direction yet" and said the album wasn't "as much a diversion as it is a realization of their potential to finally seize the full emo spirit in all its glory". Lindsay Wiseman of Jesus Freak Hideout said, "Much respect is deserved and given to Anberlin for making the always-risky move to a major record company... Through the differences you will find, you will see these changes are not necessarily negative. At the heart of this album, you know it's still Anberlin." AbsolutePunk's writer Blake Solomon said he "was forced to deal with some devastating news: Anberlin has signed to a major label," going onto reveal, "Of course it’s just my luck that New Surrender rocks with the force of Blueprints (for the Blackmarket) and smarts of Never Take Friendship Personal." Patrol Magazine's David Sessions gave the album a 7.1/10, after being especially impressed by the opening track. "Like last time, New Surrender opens with a stunning, rocketing, riot-igniting send-off, except that “The Resistance” knocks “Godspeed” flat on its back, immediately demanding to be named Best Anberlin Track Ever."

Tony Cummings of Cross Rhythms gave it a 10/10, alluding to how "Predictably non-Christian critics sneer at Anberlin, Mojo magazine recently decrying, that 'painfully sincere emoting'", which is why he "can only suggest Cross Rhythms readers take the advice of the vocal hook on 'The Resistance' and 'Think for yourself.'" At CCM Magazine, Andy Argyrakis gave it a 5/5, saying that "Long story short, New Surrender is hands-down one of 2008’s most essential albums to own and is sure to position Anberlin as much deserved cross-cultural superstars." Tim Grierson of About.com gave it a 3.5/5, commenting that "New Surrender may lack the rough edges of earlier Anberlin efforts, but its sleek musicianship and heartfelt songs are significant compensation." At Christianity Today, Russ Breimeier gave it 4.5/5, referencing that "though Cities will undoubtedly remain the favorite to many, these ears can't help but appreciate New Surrender as Anberlin's most varied and mature album to date." James Morovich of The Phantom Tollbooth gave it a 4/5, noting how Cities will be the best the band put out, but noting that "this album does nothing to take away me calling them one of the best Alternative Rock bands writing music right now." At Melodic, Kaj Roth gave it a 3.5/5, saying the band have "deliver[ed] a set of mighty fine songs."

=== Chart performance and sales ===
In the week of its release, New Surrender sold 36,000 units, entering the Billboard 200 at the number 13 position, surpassing the number 19 peak reached by Cities. It was also announced that the album had debuted at number five on the Billboard Top Modern Rock / Alternative Albums chart, number one on the Top Christian Albums chart, number six on the Top Digital Albums chart. New Surrender came in at number 85 on the Australian ARIA charts.

In its first two weeks, New Surrender sold over 45,000 copies in the United States alone. The album held its ground in the Billboard 200, staying in the top 100 for three weeks, coming in at number 50 in week two and 79 in week three.

==== Singles chart positions ====
Single	Chart (2009)	Peak position
"Feel Good Drag"	U.S. Billboard Modern Rock Tracks	1
"Feel Good Drag"	U.S. Billboard Bubbling Under Hot 100	8

== Track listing ==
- All songs written and composed by Anberlin unless otherwise noted.

No.	Title	Writer(s)	Length
1.	"The Resistance"	Christian; Milligan; Anberlin	3:17
2.	"Breaking"	Christian; Milligan; Walker; Anberlin	3:26
3.	"Blame Me! Blame Me!"	Christian; Milligan; Anberlin	3:09
4.	"Retrace"	Christian; McAlhaney; Milligan; Wilson; Anberlin	3:51
5.	"Feel Good Drag"	Christian; Milligan; Anberlin	3:08
6.	"Disappear"	Christian; Milligan; McAlhaney; Anberlin	3:37
7.	"Breathe"	Christian; Milligan; Anberlin	3:35
8.	"Burn Out Brighter (Northern Lights)"	Christian; Milligan; McAlhaney; Anberlin	3:34
9.	"Younglife"	Christian; Milligan; Walker; Anberlin	3:40
10.	"Haight Street"	Christian; Milligan; Anberlin	2:59
11.	"Soft Skeletons"	Christian; Milligan; Allan; Anberlin	4:09
12.	"Miserabile Visu (Ex Malo Bonum)"	Christian; McAlhaney; Milligan; Anberlin	6:37

Walmart exclusive
No.	Title	Length
13.	"Said and Done"	4:06
14.	"The Unwinding Cable Car" (acoustic)	4:24

USB Stick Edition exclusive
No.	Title	Length
13.	"Feel Good Drag" (remix)	2:59
14.	"Breaking (aka Bittersweet Memory)" (acoustic remix)
15.	"Hello Alone" (remix)	3:26
16.	"The Unwinding Cable Car" (remix)	4:10

iTunes exclusive
No.	Title	Length
13.	"Heavier Things Remain (Graviora Manent)"	3:29

2009 Deluxe Edition
No.	Title	Writer(s)	Length
13.	"Mother" (Danzig cover)	Glenn Danzig	3:21
14.	"Heavier Things Remain (Graviora Manent)"		3:29
15.	"True Faith" (New Order cover)	New Order	3:41
16.	"Said and Done"		4:04
17.	"A Perfect Tourniquet"	Anberlin	3:13
18.	"Feel Good Drag" (Acoustic)	Christian; Milligan; Anberlin	3:23
19.	"Anberlin" (26-minute video of Anberlin live in Australia 2009)		26:11
20.	"Feel Good Drag" (Music Video)		3:09
21.	"Breaking" (Video of Anberlin playing "Breaking" live at the Soundwave Festival)		3:25

Rhapsody exclusive
No.	Title	Length
13.	"Disappear (remix)"	3:05

Best Buy exclusive Bonus DVD
No.	Title	Length
1.	"Retrace (Acoustic) (Live)"
2.	"Breaking (Acoustic) (Live)"
3.	"Feel Good Drag (Acoustic) (Live)"
4.	"Breathe (Acoustic) (Live)"

UK release
No.	Title	Writer(s)	Length
13.	"A Perfect Tourniquet"	Anberlin	3:14

== Release history ==
Country	Date	Label	Format	Catalogue #
United States	September 30, 2008	Universal	CD, vinyl	B0011710-02
Australia	October 4, 2008	Universal	CD	1780295
United Kingdom	October 13, 2008	Universal	CD, gatefold 2xLP	1204301

== Personnel ==
- Stephen Christian – lead vocals, piano, keyboards
- Joseph Milligan – lead guitar, backing vocals
- Christian McAlhaney – rhythm guitar, backing vocals
- Deon Rexroat – bass guitar
- Nathan Young – drums, percussion

Additional musicians

- Sean Mackin - orchestration, string arrangements
- Samuel Fischer - violin
- Ginger Murphy - cello
- Sara Parkins - violin
- Anna Stafford - violin
- Amy Wickman - violin

Production

- Neal Avron - production, engineering, mixing
- Nate Albert - A&R
- Jordan Butcher - art direction, design
- Dave Colvin - assistant engineer
- Mike Fasano - drum technician
- Nicolas Fournier - mixing assistant
- Kyle Griner - management
- Ted Jensen - mastering
- Mike Laza - assistant engineer
- Tom MacKay - A&R
- James Minchin - photography
- Alyssa Pittaluga - assistant engineer
- Erich Talaba - engineer
