= Felt (Anchor & Braille album) =

Studio album by Anchor & Braille
- Released: August 4, 2009
- Recorded: 2004–2008
- Genres: Acoustic rock, baroque pop, folk, ambient, new wave
- Length: 45:35
- Label: Wood Water
- Producer: Aaron Marsh

Anchor & Braille chronology
7" single (2007)	Felt (2009)	The Quiet Life (2012)

Felt is the debut studio album by Anchor & Braille, the side-project of Anberlin lead vocalist, Stephen Christian. The album was released through Christian's own label Wood Water Records and Federal Distribution on August 4, 2009 and was produced, engineered and mixed by Aaron Marsh from fellow Florida-based band Copeland.

Felt debuted at number 30 on the Billboard Top Heatseekers chart.

== Release and promotion ==
Felt is the first release on Christian's own record label, Wood Water Records. Wood Water is distributed by Anberlin's record label Universal Music Group. The album's title was explained by Christian in a press release by the label, "I named the record Felt at the request of a friend because the meaning, much like the songs on the record, has two different levels; a surface and a deeper. The first meaning of the word ‘Felt’ is the past tense of the word ‘feels’ because these songs are all past memories, which I have learned, mourned, and grown from. The second meaning of ‘felt’ is the fabric which connotes a very sensual imagery, hopefully much like the music and melodies themselves."

The album was completed in 2008 and was initially expected to be released sometime in the fall after four years of work on the album. However, due to Christian's touring duties with Anberlin to promote their album New Surrender and the fact that Christian wanted to tour the Anchor & Braille material, he chose to wait until he had completed his commitments with Anberlin.

Anchor & Braille toured the US in July with Copeland, Sherwood, Meese and Barcelona. Prior to the album's release, a full stream was made available on the Anchor & Braille MySpace page. The album was released on August 4, 2009.

== Musical style ==
Christian describes the sound of Felt as "exploring a museum at night with all the lights off. There are moments of mastery on this record, and the closer you study the lyrics, songs, & ethereal layers the more beauty and enjoyment you will get out of it."

The album differs from the Anberlin albums in that it features a toned down sound and will consist of mostly acoustic instruments. However it is also augmented with additional instrumentation by Marsh to create a more ambient feel. In an interview with Spin magazine, Christian commented on the album's production, "I would go into [Marsh's] home studio and lay down scratch piano, guitar, and vocal line," Christian explains. "After I'd head out on tour, he would fill in the skeleton and ultimately give it the production soul, and when I would return, I would find myself singing over a song with incredible musicianship." Christian has said that the "songs are mostly songs of regret and heartache, with hopes that each and every one rings of nostalgia and better times for all who listen... These are some of the most painful songs I have ever written but with each song I felt a sense of relief and on some level an almost spiritual repentance and cleansing."

== Reception ==
Professional ratings
Review scores
Source	Rating
AbsolutePunk	(87%)
Alternative Press	4.5/5 stars

Felt was well received by critics, with the work being praised for being well distinguished from Anberlin, even though each song was written and recorded between Christian's work with the band on albums and tours. Alternative Press reviewer Emily Zemler said "the tracks on Felt exist in their own musical sphere, resonating with quiet, emotive tension." She commended Aaron Marsh's production work, stating his "talent for production is also evident throughout the disc. He transforms Christian's thoughtful songs into complex, ethereal arrangements while allowing Christian's emotional urgency to seep into each layer." Rating the album 4.5/5, Zemler noted the album showcases the talents of two musicians whose musical skills are not always so explicitly evident in their other bands, backtracking to proclaim, "Or perhaps Felt just reveals a new facet of those talents--and it's a facet of which we hope to see more."

AbsolutePunk reviewer Steve Henderson gave the album 87%, saying "the record is a stunning achievement." He described the songs "Blur" and "Introspect" as "a gorgeous pair of compositions that take a more patient approach, and the results are stunning, especially on the latter, where Stephen’s vocals ebb and flow effortlessly on top of a pitch-perfect arrangement." Henderson also complimented Christian's vocals throughout, which he says "work well with the anthem-minded Anberlin, they seem just as fitting on these minimalist charmers." He did however say the record does lose steam in the middle with "Calm, Calm, Calm Yourself" and "Sleep. When We Die.", the latter of which may feel "a little stale for longtime fans that have had the track for years." He closed in saying "Fans of Stephen Christian and Aaron Marsh will likely approach Anchor & Braille's Felt with the highest of expectations. Luckily for those followers, their anticipations are rewarded in full".

== Track listing ==
1. "Rust (The Short Story of Mary Agnosia)" — 3:48
2. "Like Steps in a Dance" — 3:34
3. "Blur." — 4:27
4. "Introspect" — 4:17
5. "Summer Tongues" — 5:26
6. "Calm, Calm, Calm Yourself" — 2:42
7. "Wedding/Funeral." — 4:46
8. "Sleep. When We Die." — 4:19
9. "Forget Love, I Just Want You to Make Sense to Me Tonight." — 4:41
10. "Sing Out" — 3:21
11. "Sheet Music/Sheet Music" — 4:06

Vinyl bonus track

1. "Empires" - 3:44

== Chart performance ==
Chart (2009)	Peak position
US Billboard Top Heatseekers	30

== Personnel ==
- Stephen Christian — guitar, piano, vocals, author
- Aaron Marsh — bass, guitar, piano, trombone, producer, engineer, horn arrangements, string arrangements, mixing, guest vocals on "Forget Love, I Just Want You to Make Sense to Me Tonight"
- Troy Glessner — mastering
- Steve Jones — trumpet
- Louis DiFabrizio — bass guitar
- Ryan Clark — design
- Jonathan Bucklew - drums (also drums for Copeland)
