= Breaking (song) =

Single by Anberlin

from the album New Surrender
- Released: June 29, 2009
- Recorded: 2008 at NRG Recording Studios in North Hollywood, California
- Genre: Alternative rock, emo
- Length: 3:26
- Label: Universal Republic
- Songwriters: Stephen Arnold, Joseph Milligan, Deon Rexroat, Nathan Young, Christian McAlhaney, Butch Walker
- Producer: Neal Avron

Anberlin singles chronology
"Feel Good Drag" (2008)	"Breaking" (2009)	"True Faith" (2009)

"Breaking" is a song by American alternative rock band, Anberlin, and the second single from their album New Surrender. The release date for the song was originally set for January 2009, then February 16, but was pushed back several more times due to the continued success of previous single "Feel Good Drag". The song officially impacted radio on June 29, 2009 and reached number 23 on the Alternative Songs chart. It has also reached number 37 on the U.S. Rock Songs chart.

== Chart performance ==
Chart	Peak Position
US Alternative Songs (Billboard)	23
