= Songs for the Late Night Drive Home =

Studio album by Anchor & Braille
- Released: February 5, 2016
- Genres: Synthpop, chillwave, alternative R&B
- Length: 34:23
- Label: Tooth & Nail

Anchor & Braille chronology
The Quiet Life (2012)	Songs for the Late Night Drive Home (2016)

Songs for the Late Night Drive Home is the third studio album from American singer-songwriter Anchor & Braille, the solo alias of Anberlin's lead vocalist Stephen Christian. Tooth & Nail Records released the album on February 5, 2016, as their second release with the label.

== Critical reception ==
Professional ratings
Review scores
Source	Rating
AbsolutePunk	8.0/10
Already Heard	3.5/5 stars
Jesus Freak Hideout	4/5 stars 3.5/5 stars
Jesus Wired	90/100
New Release Today	4/5 stars

Songs for the Late Night Drive Home received generally positive reviews from music critics. Craig Ismaili, allocating the album an 8.0 review at AbsolutePunk, says, "it's one of the many things that keeps me coming back to the record again and again." Awarding the album four stars from Jesus Freak Hideout, Roger Gelwicks writes, "Anchor & Braille puts forth a serene and engaging journey with Songs for the Late Night Drive Home, and it's an eclectic early favorite for the year." Christopher Smith, rating the album three and a half stars for Jesus Freak Hideout, describes, "Songs For The Late Night Drive Home is more than just a great name for a playlist, it is an alluring, thoughtful and cohesive musical experience." Giving the album four stars from Jesus Freak Hideout, Scott Fryberger states, "Christian's latest solo venture finds the artist surrounding his signature vocals with an electronic array of soothing soundscapes that really make you want to take a late night drive for no other reason than to listen to this while you do it." Jonathan J. Francesco, allotting the album four stars at New Release Today, says, "This is not Anberlin. But it is another side of master musician Stephen Christian, and virtually anything that guy sings is worth your time." Indicating in a 90 percent review at Jesus Wired, Billy Praise writes, "no matter the personal issues and qualms I may have, it’s an undeniable fact that very few albums live up to their names or the reason for which they were created. Stephen Christian has done just that and more". Luke Nuttall, signaling in a three and a half star review by Already Heard, states, "'Songs For The Late Night Drive Home’ is a surprisingly slick and well-executed album."

== Track listing ==
No.	Title	Length
1.	"Watch You Burn"	3:53
2.	"Detroit Stab"	3:33
3.	"Lower East Side"	3:31
4.	"Fatal Flaw"	2:52
5.	"Nightfall"	4:06
6.	"Keep Dancin'"	3:11
7.	"Live Fast. Die Young."	3:03
8.	"Chances"	3:19
9.	"Summer"	3:24
10.	"Still Looking"	3:31
Total length:		34:23

== Chart performance ==
Chart (2016)	Peak position
US Top Christian Albums (Billboard)	21
US Heatseekers Albums (Billboard)	9
US Independent Albums (Billboard)	29
US Top Rock Albums (Billboard)	43
