= Kevin Daley =

Kevin Daley may refer to:

- Kevin Daley (basketball)
- Kevin Daley (politician)
- Kevin Daley (Pinup model)

== See also ==
- Kevin Daly (disambiguation)
- Kevin Dailey, musician and composer
