= Ntfp =

NTFP may refer to:

- Never Take Friendship Personal, an album by the band Anberlin
- Non-timber forest product, a natural resource that is harvested from the forest such as fruits, nuts, latex, leaves, mushrooms and more
