= Impossible (Anberlin song) =

Single by Anberlin

from the album Dark Is the Way, Light Is a Place
- Released: July 12, 2010
- Recorded: March 2010
- Studio: Blackbird Studios, Nashville, Tennessee
- Genre: Alternative rock, pop rock
- Length: 4:04
- Label: Universal Republic
- Songwriters: Stephen Arnold, Joseph Milligan, Deon Rexroat, Nathan Young, Christian McAlhaney
- Producer: Brendan O'Brien

Anberlin singles chronology
"True Faith" (2009)	"Impossible" (2010)	"Closer" (2011)

"Impossible" is a song by the band Anberlin. It is the second track and first single from their fifth studio album, Dark Is the Way, Light Is a Place. The song officially hit radio on July 12, 2010.

== Charts ==
Chart (2010–11)	Peak position
US Alternative Airplay (Billboard)	5
US Rock Songs (Billboard)	14
US Adult Top 40 (Billboard)	35
US Christian Songs (Billboard)	36
European Hot 100 (Billboard)	53

== Release history ==
Release dates and formats for "Impossible"
Region	Date	Format	Label(s)	Ref.
United States	November 16, 2010	Mainstream airplay	Universal Republic	
