= Paperthin Hymn =

Single by Anberlin

from the album Never Take Friendship Personal
- Released: January 10, 2006
- Genre: Alternative rock
- Length: 3:17
- Label: Tooth & Nail
- Songwriter(s): Stephen Arnold, Joseph Milligan, Deon Rexroat, Nathan Young

Anberlin singles chronology
"A Day Late" (2005)	"Paperthin Hymn" (2006)	"Godspeed" (2007)

Audio sample
- file; help

"Paperthin Hymn" is the second single from alternative rock band Anberlin's second album Never Take Friendship Personal. The song charted at No. 38 on Modern Rock Chart in the U.S. The song was reportedly inspired by the death of guitarist Joseph Milligan's sister at 29 due to cancer. It is also on the Midnight Sun playlist, created by Stephenie Meyer. The song was performed by the band on G4's Attack of the Show! in 2006.

The song is also featured in the teaser trailer for the movie Broken Path.

The song became Anberlin's first song to chart on the U.S. Alternative Airplay chart, where it reached No. 38 in March 2006.

== Video ==
The music video shows the band performing in a hospital. At the same time, it shows a series of events where a man visits his girlfriend as she lies unconscious in a hospital, and they run around the building playing and having fun. However, at the end of the video, it becomes clear that she was simply dreaming. She wakes up, and sees her boyfriend dying next to her in a hospital bed. The video was featured on a Wal-Mart Compilation DVD.

== Track listing ==
Radio Single
No.	Title	Length
1.	"Paperthin Hymn"	3:17

== Chart performance ==
Chart (2006)	Peak position
US Alternative Airplay (Billboard)	38
