= Kevin Daly =

Kevin Daly may refer to:

- Kevin Daly (architect), American architect
- Kevin Daly (economist), British-Irish economist

== See also ==
- Kevin Dailey, composer
- Kevin Daley (disambiguation)
