= Feel Good Drag =

Single by Anberlin

from the album New Surrender
- Released: August 19, 2008
- Recorded: 2008
- Studio: NRG Recording Studios, North Hollywood, California
- Genre: Alternative rock
- Length: 3:08
- Label: Universal Republic
- Songwriters: Christian, Milligan, Anberlin
- Producers: Neal Avron, A. Marten

Anberlin singles chronology
"The Unwinding Cable Car" (2007)	"Feel Good Drag" (2008)	"Breaking" (2009)

Audio sample
- file; help

"Feel Good Drag" (originally released as "The Feel Good Drag") is a song by American alternative rock band Anberlin. The song originally appeared on the band's second album Never Take Friendship Personal and was re-recorded for their fourth album, New Surrender. "Feel Good Drag" became the first single from New Surrender, which was the band's first album on major label Universal Republic. It was intended for release to American radio stations on August 18, 2008; however, after a week-long delay, it was released on August 26, 2008.

The single spent 29 weeks climbing the Alternative Songs chart before reaching number one. It was the longest rise to the top since the chart's 1988 inception, breaking the previous record set in February 2006 by 10 Years, with their 27-week journey for the song "Wasteland". The record was later overtaken by Phoenix's "1901", which reached number one in early 2010 after 31 weeks. That record was later eclipsed by the song "Animal" by Neon Trees. The re-recorded version is featured in the main setlist of Guitar Hero: Warriors of Rock and also on Rock Band as downloadable content. The song was certified gold (500,000 copies sold) by the RIAA on January 22, 2014.

== Recording ==
The song was originally released as "The Feel Good Drag" on Anberlin's second album Never Take Friendship Personal, in 2005. It was re-recorded for New Surrender in early to mid-2008. The recording of "Feel Good Drag" took place at multiple recording studios in Hollywood, California. The song was produced, along with the album, by Neal Avron. The first recording for the album took place at Swing House Recordings in West Hollywood, followed by NRG Recording Studios in North Hollywood. They completed recording at The Boat Studio in Silver Lake.

After the band announced the song as their choice for the first single for New Surrender, some fans began to question the choice online, intoning that perhaps their record label had pushed them to re-record the song due to lack of faith in their new material. In response, singer Stephen Christian wrote a missive for Jason Tate of AbsolutePunk.net to post. "We chose to re-record 'Feel Good Drag'," said Christian. "The label had nothing to do with it AT ALL," Christian went on to say. Christian went on to describe how the band wanted to begin their radio push with a heavy song that could catch on with a wide audience: "We didn't want to start out with something like an 'Unwinding Cable Car' or 'Inevitable'".

On top of expressing the band's own liking of the song (and feeling that it did not get the attention it deserved on Never Take Friendship Personal), Christian said that the song was also redone because "we were counting on them [the fans] recognizing the song on the radio, feeling somehow connected to it and us, and calling in to request it more... we need you again! after all 'the feel good drag' was your song! you knew about it first, you have the original version and 'like it better', you knew us when..., this doesn't have to change.”

== Music video ==
Anberlin announced in August 2008 that they would be shooting a music video for "Feel Good Drag". In September, it was announced that the video would be produced by Endeavor Media. The video was produced by Brandon Bonfiglio (Fall Out Boy, Paramore) and directed by Steven Hoover. It premiered on Yahoo! Music on October 29, 2008.

The video shows the story of a female character entering a bath full of black water. It includes cut scenes of the band playing in a bathroom. Throughout the video, a man (possibly one of the members of the band) is shown banging on the door to the bathroom, trying to force himself in, while the woman begins to submerge herself into the water. At the end of the video, the man successfully breaks in, but is too late to save the woman, who has now disappeared into the shower drain, and all that is left of her is her dress. Commenting on the female character in the video, drummer Nathan Young said "it's kind of a mysterious thing, she's not really human, and then so it kind of shows that as it goes along, she kind of disappears with the black water when she unplugs it". The music video's concept reportedly took a month and a half to come up with.

== Track listing ==
1. "Feel Good Drag" - 3:08

=== 7" vinyl one ===
1. "Feel Good Drag" - 3:08
2. "Blame Me! Blame Me!" (Remix) - 2:57

=== 7" vinyl two ===
1. "Feel Good Drag" - 3:08
2. "A Perfect Tourniquet" - 3:14

== Reception ==
"Feel Good Drag" found a wide audience with its single release in 2008. The song received airplay on SiriusXM's Alt Nation channel, appearing at No. 1 on its Top 21 playlist. It also featured at No. 7 on the Alternative Addiction Top 20. The song peaked at No. 3 on the Fuse TV No. 1 Countdown, as well as No. 1 in the No. 1 Audience Choice Countdown and No. 18 in the No. 1 Alternative Countdown. It was ranked as the No. 1 song of 2009 on 89X Radio at midnight January 1, 2010. "Feel Good Drag" was selected for inclusion in the iPhone OS game Tap Tap Revenge, with a special edition remix of the song being produced. In April 2009, "Feel Good Drag" reached No. 1 on the Billboard Alternative Songs chart, after 29 weeks on the chart. In 2014, the record proceeded to reach Gold status in the RIAA sales. In September 2023, for the 35th anniversary of Alternative Songs (by which time it had been renamed to Alternative Airplay), Billboard ranked the song at number 79 on its list of the 100 most successful songs in the chart's history.

=== Chart positions ===
Chart (2008–09)	Peak position
U.S. Billboard Alternative Songs	1
U.S. Billboard Bubbling Under Hot 100 Singles^{[A]}	8
U.S. Billboard Heatseekers Songs	31
Canada Rock National Airplay	35

- A The song peaked outside of the top 100 in the Billboard Hot 100, therefore it is listed on the Bubbling Under Hot 100 Singles chart.

== Certifications ==
Region	Certification	Certified units/sales
United States (RIAA)	Gold	500,000^{‡}
^{‡} Sales+streaming figures based on certification alone.
