= Godspeed (EP) =

Godspeed EP

EP by Anberlin
- Released: December 26, 2006
- Recorded: 2006; Seattle, Washington
- Genre: Alternative rock; pop-punk
- Length: 8:58
- Label: Tooth & Nail
- Producer: Aaron Sprinkle

Anberlin chronology
Never Take Friendship Personal (2005)	Godspeed EP (2006)	Cities (2007)

Anberlin singles chronology
"Paperthin Hymn" (2005)	"Godspeed" (2006)	"The Unwinding Cable Car" (2007)

Professional ratings
Review scores
Source	Rating
Jesus Freak Hideout	4/5 stars

Godspeed EP is the first EP (and third release overall) by the band Anberlin. It was December 26, 2006, though it was originally proposed to be released two days later. Included in the EP are two tracks. The first track is "Godspeed," the first single of their third album Cities, released on February 20, 2007. The second is "The Haunting," which appears on the compilation album Lost Songs, released on November 20, 2007.

== Single ==
Singer Stephen Christian discussed the meaning of Godspeed in an interview:

It's about different stories through rock and roll history where drugs played a major downfall or death in the persona's life, such as Jimi Hendrix, Jim Morrison, Nico, Moon, Vicious, etc. It's selfish and tiring. I feel that "rock stars" start believing their own hype and begin on an egocentric journey that inevitably ends in destruction.

He also stated in another interview that "Godspeed" was the hardest song of Cities to record, stating,

I think 'Godspeed' was the most difficult [song to record]. Not as much lyrically but it got frustrating because we couldn't figure out the chorus to the song. We may have come up with literally like 15 choruses. Or I did, it was just rough and it turned out all right!

== Track listing ==
Godspeed EP

1. "Godspeed" - 3:04
2. "The Haunting" - 5:54

Godspeed 7"

1. "(God)speed"
2. "The Unwinding Cable Car"

== Music video ==
A music video was filmed for "Godspeed", and featured the band performing the song in a forest amid many special effects.
