= Anchor & Braille =

American singer-songwriter

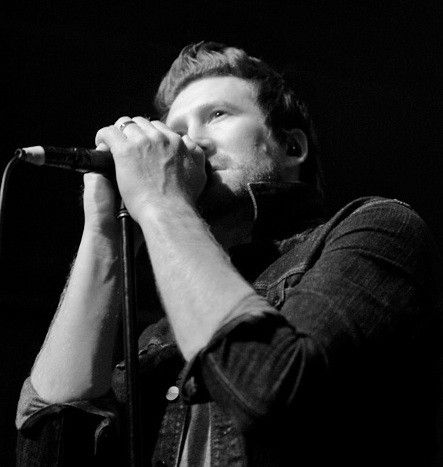

Background information
- Origin: Winter Haven, Florida, U.S.
- Genres: Acoustic rock; folk; dream pop; chillwave; electronica; synthpop; indie pop
- Years active: 2004–present
- Labels: Wood Water, Tooth & Nail, MP45, Equal Vision
- Members: Stephen Christian

Anchor & Braille is the recording alias for American singer-songwriter Stephen Christian, known for fronting the alternative rock band Anberlin. Originally conceived as a side project for Christian, Anchor & Braille became his primary vehicle for releasing music after Anberlin's initial dissolution in 2014. Christian has described Anchor & Braille as a collaborative effort, having recorded with musicians such as Aaron Marsh of Copeland, Micah Tawlks, and Kevin Dailey of Civil Twilight. Since its beginning, Christian has released five studio albums under this name, Felt in 2009, The Quiet Life in 2012, Songs for the Late Night Drive Home in 2016, Tension in 2020, and New Mexico in 2025.

== History ==
Anchor & Braille was conceived when Christian realized that he had written many songs that he knew Anberlin could never use. The songs were said to have a different feel from Anberlin's material and the lyrics were topics that he felt more personal, which he was not ready at that time to share on a mass platform.

The band streamed the entire album on their MySpace page before its release on August 4, 2009. The official website also has the demo version of "Sleep" (or "When We Die"). The songs "Wedding/Funeral", "Sheet Music" (which has been mislabeled as 'When We Die (Sleep)") and a demo of "Mary Agnosia" are featured on their PureVolume. A poetic art-loop piece called "16 Conversations" was also on the band's MySpace page for a short while. On January 23, 2007, a 7" vinyl with two songs on it, "Sound Asleep" and "Wedding / Funeral", was released online through Spartan Records and Wood Water Records and was limited to 1000 copies.

Anchor & Braille's initial output greatly contrasted with Christian's primary band, relying on toned-down instruments such as keyboards, pianos, and acoustic guitars. However, the 2009 album utilized a full band, with all songs written by Christian but produced and augmented with additional instrumentation by Marsh afterward.

The first single, "Still Sleeping", from the band's debut album was made available on iTunes. It was also featured on the compilation album Punk the Clock, Volume Three. The debut album was entitled Felt, produced by Aaron Marsh from Copeland and released on August 4, 2009. The album was released by Wood Water Records and Federal Distribution, debuting at number 30 on the Billboard Top Heatseekers chart.

A vinyl of Felt' was released on December 14, 2010 with a previously unreleased track, "Empires".

On July 31, 2012 Anchor & Braille released their second album, The Quiet Life, on Anberlin's old record label Tooth & Nail Records.

Anchor & Braille released two new singles, "Detroit Stab" and "Fatal Flaw" on October 4, 2014. On October 10, 2014 Anchor & Braille stated that "there will not be a full length album... but there may be a few more singles shortly." However, on December 8, 2015 Christian announced via his personal Instagram account that a third album entitled Songs for the Late Night Drive Home would be released on February 5, 2016 on Tooth & Nail as a continuation of his more diverse sonic terrain.

In an interview with Absolute Punk, Christian elaborated on his decision to make another full-length instead of continuing on as a singles based project as originally intended. "Well, at the time I was working with a company called MP45, and they were a single-based record label. They were helping me, fronting the money in the beginning, and they really took an interest in my project, they were really excited about it. So I was trying to help get them off the ground, and… they folded. So I was like, "I'm going to continue with Anchor and Braille, and I'll just release singles from now on, to help out this company," but then when they went under, it was kind of freeing in a way because then I could continue on recording a full-length, and go at it from there." In the same interview Christian cited the soundtrack to Drive as an influence on the new record.

Even prior to the release of the album, Christian already made an announcement via his podcast, The Art Collective with Stephen Christian, his plans for a fourth studio album with Aaron Marsh set to return as producer. He also mentioned plans for a solo worship album, perhaps to be released sometime in 2017.

Songs for the Late Night Drive Home was released on February 5, 2016.

Tension was released on May 22, 2020.

New Mexico was released on July 25, 2025.

== Discography ==
=== Albums ===
Albums by Anchor & Braille
Year	Album title	Release details	Chart peaks
Year	Album title	Release details	US Heat
2009	Felt	Released: August 4, 2009; Label: Tooth & Nail; Format: CD, digital, vinyl	30
2012	The Quiet Life	Released: July 31, 2012; Label: Tooth & Nail; Format: CD, digital, vinyl	11
2016	Songs for the Late Night Drive Home	Release: February 5, 2016; Label: Tooth & Nail; Format: CD, digital	9
2020	Tension	Release: May 22, 2020; Label: Tooth & Nail; Format: Digital, vinyl	
2025	New Mexico	Release: July 25, 2025; Label: Equal Vision; Format: Digital, vinyl	
"—" denotes a recording that did not chart or was not released in that territory.

=== Singles ===
- 2007: "Sound Asleep"
- 2007: "Wedding / Funeral"
- 2014: "Detroit Stab"
- 2014: "Fatal Flaw
- 2016: "Watch You Burn"
- 2020: "Dangerous"
- 2020: "Eventful Horizons"
- 2020: "Closer & Farther"
