= The Quiet Life =

Studio album by Anchor & Braille
- Released: July 31, 2012
- Genre: Acoustic rock, baroque pop
- Length: 41:53
- Label: Tooth & Nail
- Producer: Kevin Dailey and Micah Tawlks

Anchor & Braille chronology
Felt (2009)	The Quiet Life (2012)	Songs for the Late Night Drive Home (2016)

The Quiet Life is the second studio album by Anchor & Braille, the side project of Anberlin lead vocalist Stephen Christian. The album was released on July 31, 2012 on Tooth & Nail Records with a vinyl version expected for release on September 7, 2012.

== Release and promotion ==
"The Quiet Life" is Christian's sophomore release under the Anchor & Braille moniker. Released on Anberlin's old record label Tooth & Nail Records, Christian explained the meaning of the title on the label's website: "In the musician lifestyle we always seem to be searching for something and we never seem to find it...I've come to the conclusion that the only stability for a musician is instability. So there is this eternal search for 'the quiet life.' But I've never found it. It’s a dream, this imaginary quiet life.” The song "Find Me" explored the theme heavily.

Christian penned The Quiet Life whenever and wherever he could during the three years since the release of Felt. He recorded the album over the course of January, February and March in Peptalk Studio in his current hometown of Nashville. The studio, actually a converted basement recording space, usually houses the band Civil Twilight, whose keyboardist Kevin Dailey co-produced and engineered the album along with Anchor & Braille guitarist Micah Tawlks. A music video for "Find Me" debuted on the day of the album's release.

== Reception ==
Professional ratings
Review scores
Source	Rating
AbsolutePunk	(80%)
Alternative Press	3.5/5 stars
Jesus Freak Hideout	4/5 stars
Indie Vision Music	4/5 stars

The Quiet Life was well received by critics, with most of the praise directed at Christian's songwriting. Of "Goes Without Saying", Artist Direct called it "One of the most brilliant and beautiful entries into Christian's catalog, and it's the perfect prelude to the sonic majesty contained in The Quiet Life." AbsolutePunk called The Quiet Life "a chaotic beauty of an album as well as his (Christian's) most personal and eloquent effort to date."

Brittany Moseley of Alternative Press said "The Quiet Life is an unassuming album that doesn't stray far from the formula introduced on Felt. Fortunately for Anchor & Braille, it's a formula that continues to work". Angela Mastrogiacomo of Infectious Magazine praised the album as "a true labor of love and that kind of fervor is ever more difficult to come by these days", calling the album "Beautiful. Uplifting. Inspiring. There's nothing like it...this album is truly one for the record books." She then went on to praise the diversity of the record: "Throughout The Quiet Life we are continually transported between the calming sensations of acoustic finesse and 80s influenced splendor similar to the likes of New Order and current day electronic bands like M83, to create one beautifully tied together album, which is, very simply, overflowing with zest."

== Track listing ==
1. "Goes Without Saying" – 4:20
2. "Knew Then Know Now" – 4:11
3. "Find Me" – 4:04
4. "In with the New" – 3:19
5. "If Not Now When" – 3:28
6. "Kodachrome" – 3:13
7. "Collapse" – 4:46
8. "Hymn For Her" – 5:05
9. "Everybody Here Wants You" – 5:15
10. "Before I Start Dreaming" – 4:12

== Personnel ==
- Stephen Christian - lead and backing vocals
- Micah Tawlks - acoustic, bass, electric guitars, drums, programming, percussion, Fender Rhodes, various synthesizers and backing vocals
- Kevin Dailey - acoustic, bass, lap steel, electric guitars, programming, percussion, Fender Rhodes, piano, various synthesizers and backing vocals
- Jonathan Bucklew - drums
