= Kevin Dailey =

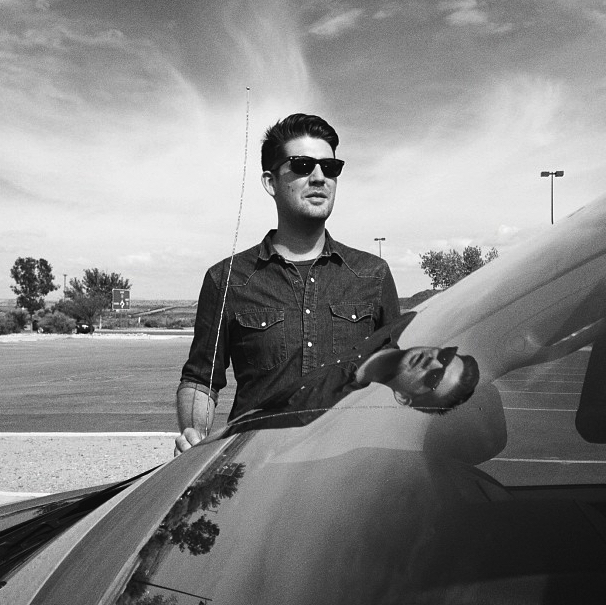

Background information
- Born: Charlotte, North Carolina, U.S.
- Genres: Indie rock; pop; hip hop; dance
- Occupations: Composer; songwriter; engineer; producer
- Years active: 2007–present
- Formerly of: Civil Twilight

Kevin Dailey is a composer, multi-instrumentalist, record producer and mixer based in Nashville, Tennessee. As a producer, engineer, musician, composer or mixer, he has worked with Béla Fleck and the Flecktones, Mikky Ekko, Rome Fortune, Myzica, Skyway Man, SHEL, and Abigail Washburn. He is a member of the band Civil Twilight. He recently composed original score for Travis Rice's recent film, Depth Perception and season one of Queen America starring Catherine Zeta-Jones.

== Background ==
Dailey was born in Charlotte, North Carolina to a family of musicians. In 2007, he moved to Nashville, Tennessee. He joined the South African rock band Civil Twilight as a guitarist and keyboardist in 2012. On tour, he has shared the stage with Florence + the Machine, Mutemath, Young the Giant, Neon Trees, Silversun Pickups, and Of Monsters and Men.

Dailey engineered the album Rocket Science, by Béla Fleck and the Flecktones. The song "Life in Eleven" won Best Instrumental Composition at the 54th Annual Grammy Awards.

In 2012, Kevin, alongside longtime friend and collaborator Micah Tawlks, produced, arranged, and played on Anchor & Braille's record The Quiet Life for Tooth & Nail Records. In 2016, Dailey wrote the MYZICA track "We Belong Together", alongside Matthew Perryman Jones and Micah Tawlks. That same year, he played bass on the SHEL album "Just Crazy Enough". In 2017, he mixed the Skyway Man album Seen Comin’ From a Mighty Eye. In 2018, Dailey and SHEL composed the musical soundtrack for a Catherine Zeta-Jones Facebook Series Queen America.

Dailey runs Pioneer Sound, an independent, artist run recording studio and music production house based in Nashville.

Dailey is an artist for Magneto Guitars.
