= Furthest Drive Home =

- Origin: Surrey, England
- Genres: Pop rock, pop punk, powerpop
- Years active: 2003–2009
- Labels: Hungry Kid
- Members: JR; J.Mc; JG; T. H

Furthest Drive Home were a melodic pop-punk band from Surrey, England. The band released their EP Lost in Genre in the summer of 2005, before playing the side stage at Brighton's "Taste of Chaos" festival, alongside The Used, Killswitch Engage and Funeral For A Friend. In the same year Furthest Drive Home were featured on a special Drive-Thru Records, Pure Volume compilation album alongside Midtown and Gym Class Heroes with the song "Future Full of Jive", which was erroneously track listed as "Control Yourself".

In January 2007, the band signed to Hungry Kid Records and recorded their debut mini album, The Complete First Series at Ignition Studios in North London, with the mastering being completed at the Abbey Road Studios.

In June 2007, The Complete First Series was released alongside lead single, "Directors Cut", to critical acclaim from Kerrang!, Rock Sound, and Big Cheese magazines along with support from BBC Radio, XFM and Kerrang! Radio. In August the video for the band's second single, "Forget His Facade", reached the number 2 spot on both the MTV2 Rock Chart and the Red Button Chart, whilst the band played at the Kerrang! awards show with Funeral for a Friend. In September they featured on the bill along with Elliot Minor at Butserfest. December 2007 saw the release of a third and final single from the mini album, "Diamond Watch". The B-side to "Diamond Watch" was a Frank Musik remix of the first single, "Directors Cut".

The band were one of the originators of the Home Counties pop music scene, which along with Furthest Drive Home produced such acts as You Me At Six, Young Guns and Futures. In March 2008, Furthest Drive Home played the 2008 SXSW Music Conference in Austin, Texas. The show they played was put on by Kerrang!

On 18 March 2009, the band announced they had split up. They completed five final dates in April 2009, finishing with a sold-out show for family and friends at the West End Centre in Aldershot.

== Former members ==
- JR - Vocals, guitar, keyboards
- JmC - Bass
- TH - Guitar, vocals
- James Green - Drums, vocals, percussion

== Discography ==
- Lost in Genre - 2006 (EP)
- The Complete First Series - 2007 (Mini album)
- "Lover Boy" / "Don't You Worry" - 2008 (Single)
