= Lowborn =

Studio album by Anberlin
- Released: July 22, 2014
- Genre: Alternative rock; emo; indie rock; new wave; pop rock
- Length: 40:04
- Label: Tooth & Nail
- Producer: Anberlin

Anberlin chronology
Devotion (2013)	Lowborn (2014)	Silverline (EP) (2022)

Singles from Lowborn
- 1. "Stranger Ways" Released: May 13, 2014; 2. "Harbinger" Released: August 27, 2014

Lowborn (stylized as lowborn) is the seventh studio album by the American alternative rock band Anberlin. The album was scheduled for release on June 24, 2014, but was pushed back to July 22, 2014. This album was produced by the band. The album has been described by Stephen Christian as "eclectic and chaotic, just like a good Anberlin record should be."

== Critical reception ==
Professional ratings
Aggregate scores
Source	Rating
Metacritic	74/100
Review scores
Source	Rating
AbsolutePunk	75%
AllMusic	3.5/5 stars
Alternative Press	3.5/5 stars
CCM Magazine	4/5 stars
Cross Rhythms	9/10 squares
HM Magazine	4/5 stars
Jesus Freak Hideout	4.5/5 stars 4/5 stars
New Release Tuesday	5/5 stars
Outburn	7/10
Rock Sound	6/10
Sputnikmusic	4/5 stars

Lowborn received positive reviews from music critics. On the review combining publication Metacritic, the album has a score of 74 taken from four reviews, meaning the project has seen generally favorable reception. In a three and a half star review by AllMusic, Matt Collar averred, "despite this heaviness, Anberlin have crafted an album of deeply emotive and, one imagines for longtime fans, cathartic songs." In a three and a half star review from Alternative Press, Evan Lucy remarked, it "isn't as good as Vital, but it still does an admirable job at continuing Anberlin's sonic expansion", but "There's a push and pull, between these styles [modern rock and new wave] that ultimately makes Lowborn feel a bit conflicted, like the yin and yang of growing older but refusing to let the fire burn out completely." In addition, Lucy says the music is best when the pendulum is right dead center between the two. Andy Biddulph, writing for Rock Sound, rated the album a six out of ten because "it's telling that the first track is the best, and while their insistence on progression must be applauded, it's a shame that this band is going out with something less than a band." In a seven out of ten review for Outburn, Dan Slessor regarded the final product as "uneven".

In a review of 75 percent by AbsolutePunk, Craig Manning wrote, "Luckily, Lowborn is a fairly strong record on a song-for-song basis, and the added emotional heft of it being a swansong helps to elevate it above the weaker entries in the band’s catalog – even despite its numerous issues." In a four star review for CCM magazine, Matt Conner declared, "Stephen Christian and company are going out on top." In a four star review by HM magazine, Chelc Eaves described the music as "imaginative and perceptive" because "The instruments sound well-mixed, and the lyrics are all very well-scripted", and it is like "the sound of a decade-old, well oiled machine" coming to a culmination. In a four star review from Sputnikmusic, SowingSeason wrote, "Lowborn is a gift to fans" showing how "Anberlin is a band that will never truly die." In a five star review from New Release Tuesday, Mary Nikkel wrote, "With Lowborn, Anberlin has set the crown on an already illustrious career" displays exactly how "The group is definitely successfully blazing out rather than fading away." In a nine out of ten review by Cross Rhythms, Tony Cummings wrote, "All in all, this is a fitting farewell to a great rock band."

In a four and a half star review by Jesus Freak Hideout, Roger Gelwicks said, "It's a complete album in every sense, and the creative process that's present here marks a seasoned band that has diversified themselves in fine ways." In a four star review for Jesus Freak Hideout's second opinion, Michael Weaver wrote, "While this isn't the Anberlin album the selfish fan in me wanted for their grand finale, it's a really nice send-off regardless and it's nice to see them go out the way they wanted." In a four star review for Jesus Freak Hideout's Additional 2 Cents, John DiBiase wrote, "This may not be the mighty bow-out that all fans were hoping for, but it's easily some of the best alt rock of the year, regardless." Scott Fryberger in another 2 Cents review rated the album four and a half stars because "Anberlin is a class act, and Lowborn is an excellent way to go out." Mark Rice, in yet another 2 Cents review, rated the album four stars and said that, according to him, it is "more mellow" than fans expect, whilst "the music often overpowers Stephen Christian's vocals to the point of intelligibility." Conversely, Rice said that "while Lowborn may not be the "final album" most fans hoped it would be, that does not detract from its excellence." In another 2 Cents review by Wayne Myatt, he rated the album four and a half stars noting, "Although this album is certainly a departure from past releases, it still provides a fresh sound that becomes more rewarding after each listen."

== Announcement ==
The first announcement of the album came in a video posted on the band's official website, announcing their intentions of touring America, Australia, Sweden, Philippines and the UK once more and releasing a final album before disbanding by the end of 2014 (though they would reunite in 2018). In the video, it was revealed that this last album would be released on Tooth & Nail Records, which had originally signed the band and released their first three records.

== Writing process ==
The band expressed feeling "true artistic freedom" and being "liberated from any sort of expectation or pressure" for the album, knowing it would be their last. Stephen Christian wished to enjoy the creative process once more, without restrictions or pressure for a radio single. The band started collecting new material at the end of 2012, with a focus on "crafting solidly good ideas that melded each musician’s individual tastes and influences" rather than to "cranking out as many songs as possible". Nathan Young, in discussing the writing process, described "a fearlessness which was really freeing and exciting...to just not have to think about anything else except what’s the best thing for the song.”

== Recording and promotion ==
The band tweeted in January 2014 that they had "the dream team" of "AM.MG.AS." for the final album referring to possible producers Aaron Marsh, Matt Goldman and Aaron Sprinkle, all of whom had previously worked with the band. Later in February, a blurry screenshot of what appeared to be demos of the album was posted on Twitter. Young entered the studio on February 18, and the band indirectly confirmed Goldman's involvement in the recording process. Drum tracking was completed three days later. On April 24, the band announced that the record was already "tracked, mixed, and mastered". On May 5, Tooth & Nail put up a promotional webpage where fans could unlock the new album cover by sharing the page. The title was revealed to be Lowborn, and a page was added to the Tooth & Nail website, revealing the track listing and a press release with details about the album. Pre-order packages were announced on May 16, and included a download of the first single, "Stranger Ways", which was also streamed exclusively on Billboard.com the same day. According to Christian, the song "embodies a lot of what Anberlin will be remembered for; the 80's influence, dark dactylic lyrics, and intriguing melodies and music", but warned that the song "is not the embodiment of the record", assuring fans that the entire album is not as somber.

== Track listing ==
All tracks are written by Anberlin and Stephen Christian but are joined by Micah Tawlks on track No. 1.

No.	Title	Length
1.	"We Are Destroyer"	3:29
2.	"Armageddon"	4:05
3.	"Stranger Ways"	4:42
4.	"Velvet Covered Brick"	3:56
5.	"Atonement"	4:17
6.	"Birds of Prey"	3:55
7.	"Dissenter"	3:15
8.	"Losing It All"	4:14
9.	"Hearing Voices"	3:34
10.	"Harbinger"	4:37
Total length:		40:04

== Personnel ==
Anberlin

- Stephen Christian - lead vocals, keyboards, production
- Joseph Milligan - lead guitar, vocals, production
- Christian McAlhaney - rhythm guitar, vocals, production
- Deon Rexroat - bass guitar, production
- Nathan Young - drums, percussion, production

== Chart performance ==
Chart (2014)	Peak position
US Billboard 200	10
US Top Alternative Albums (Billboard)	1
US Top Christian Albums (Billboard)	1
US Independent Albums (Billboard)	2
US Top Rock Albums (Billboard)	2
