= Dark Is the Way, Light Is a Place =

Studio album by Anberlin
- Released: September 7, 2010
- Recorded: March 13 – April 20, 2010
- Studios: Blackbird (Nashville, Tennessee)
- Genres: Alternative rock; emo pop; pop
- Length: 41:04
- Label: Universal Republic
- Producer: Brendan O'Brien

Anberlin chronology
New Surrender (2008)	Dark Is the Way, Light Is a Place (2010)	Vital (2012)

Singles from Dark Is the Way, Light Is a Place
- 1. "Impossible" Released: July 12, 2010; 2. "Closer" Released: February 16, 2011

Dark Is the Way, Light Is a Place is the fifth studio album by American alternative rock band Anberlin, their second album released through major label Universal Republic, on September 7, 2010. The band recorded the album in Nashville, at Blackbird Studios with Grammy Award-winning producer Brendan O'Brien.

== Production ==
The band entered Blackbird Studio in Nashville, to begin recording the album in March 2010. It was announced on March 3 that the band would be working with Grammy Award- winning producer Brendan O'Brien, who has worked with the likes of Pearl Jam and Rage Against the Machine. The band was unsure which producer to select for the album, they were however approached by O'Brien. O'Brien had followed Anberlin's career after being introduced to their music by his daughter.

The album title is a reference to the Dylan Thomas work Poem On His Birthday. The album examines themes of battles in life and love. Lead singer Stephen Christian states that "Love is a friction, a chemistry... We need to fight it out in a good way, not with threats of leaving, but to, in love, find an understanding."

The artwork for the album is a charcoal on paper drawing by artist Michael Zavros, created in 2006.

== Promotion ==
The first single of the album, "Impossible," went to radio on July 12. "We Owe This to Ourselves," another track from the album, was the main song used for the 2010 ESPN's X-Games, Shift 2: Unleashed, and as part of Tony Hawk: Shred soundtrack. "To the Wolves" was used during the 2010 season of NBC Sunday Night Football while "You Belong Here" was featured on commercials for season 10 of American Idol.

When asked about the possible impact of the new album, Stephen replied 'I feel like we're on the brink of something... either world domination or destruction, but either way we're on the brink'. He later revealed that the band believed that "this is the best record that we can ever accomplish", saying the band was "absolutely in our element on this record".

== Release ==
The album debuted at No. 9 on the Billboard 200 chart, selling 31,000 units in its first week. It also opened at No. 1 on Billboard's Christian Albums chart, No. 2 on Digital Albums, No. 4 on Rock Albums, No. 4 on Alternative Albums, and No. 9 on Tastemaker Albums.

== Critical reception ==
Professional ratings
Aggregate scores
Source	Rating
Metacritic	71/100
Review scores
Source	Rating
AbsolutePunk	90%
AllMusic	3.5/5 stars
Alternative Press	4/5 stars
Cross Rhythms	8/10 squares
HM Magazine	4/5 stars
Indie Vision Music	4/5 stars
Jesus Freak Hideout	4/5 stars
Kerrang!	3/5 stars
New Release Tuesday	5/5 stars
Melodic	3.5/5 stars
Mojo	2/5 stars
Q	4/5 stars
Rock Sound	8/10
Sputnikmusic	4/5 stars

Dark Is the Way, Light Is a Place garnered generally positive reception from music critics. The review aggregator website Metacritic gives a weighted average rating to an album based upon the selected independent mainstream reviews it utilizes, and the album has a Metascore of a 71 out of 100 based on eight reviews.

At AllMusic, Gregory Heaney rated the album three-and-a-half stars out of five, indicating how the slower tempos on songs such as 'Take Me (As You Found Me)' will "ultimately prove more rewarding in the long run". Faye Lewis of Rock Sound rated the album an eight out of ten, remarking how the band gets to "dabble with a more interesting, darker edge that borders on Circa Survive." At Alternative Press, Evan Lucy rated the album four stars out of five, observing how the band ""allow Stephen Christian's strong lyricism and impassioned vocals to take center stage to deliver some of his finest performances yet." In addition, Lacy writes that "Dark Is The Way, Light Is A Place is largely proof that what Anberlin might now lack in immediate catchiness, they more than make up for in composure." At Q, they rated the album four stars out of five, stating how "The grandstanding result sounds like U2 if Bono had decided tattoos, obscure piercings and the occasional sore-throated growl were the way forward."

Drew Beringer of AbsolutePunk rated the album a 90 out of 100-percent, highlighting how the release contains "engaging rock and roll album anyone can relate to" that also "will serve as the perfect companion". At Kerrang!, they rated the album three stars out of five, saying how Anberlin with respect to this release "get it right, returning to form with a combination of heartfelt bombast, big choruses and bona fide hooks". Adam Thomas of Sputnikmusic rated the album four stars out of five, stating how the release is no masterpiece but still further solidifies the band "at the top of the US radio-rock universe." At Mojo, they rated the album two stars out of five, cautioning how "Listeners outside their target teen demographic will find all this painfully sincere emoting pretty joyless." Essi Berelian over at Classic Rock rated the album a six out of ten.

Doug Van Pelt of HM Magazine rated the album four stars, observing how it sound exactly like an Anberlin release with "Happy, snappy rhythms cascade up and down energetically while Stephen Christian's melodic voice crest the top of pretty much each and every song like thick cavity-inducing frosting." At Cross Rhythms, Ewan Jones rated the album eight squares out of ten, remarking how the music "grabs you by the throat and demands that you listen". Roger Gelwicks of Jesus Freak Hideout rated the album four stars out of five, indicating how the release "indeed still feels a little short, and with one notably inferior track in the mix, it certainly isn't a perfect album." Also, Jesus Freak Hideout's Jen Rose rated the album four stars out of five, stating how the release felt short in terms of duration, but the music comes "dangerously close to at least matching it as both a mature step forward and a reminder to fans why they fell for this band in the first place". At New Release Tuesday, Jonathan Francesco rated the album a perfect five stars, highlighting how "It's a stunningly amazing album from start to finish, with not a drop of filler to be found anywhere."

At Melodic, Tom Spinelli rated the album three-and-a-half stars out of five, stating how the band "were really [into] their element on this record", which is why "It definitely has a mix of all their records on this one and all the classic Anberlin sound you love to hear", and it "will open up the boundaries" for the group. Eric Pettersson of Indie Vision Music rated the album four stars out of five, writing how it is "still the same style, but better than ever". At BLARE, Leah Beresford rated the album three-and-a-half stars out of five, writing that the release "reveals how dedication and perseverance are two key ingredients in spawning something great". Christian Music Zine's Tyler Hess rated the album a perfect five stars, stating how the music is "worth it" because it "is a classic Anberlin album with all the fixins to whet your appetite".

== Track listing ==
All tracks are written by Anberlin.

No.	Title	Length
1.	"We Owe This to Ourselves"	3:12
2.	"Impossible"	4:03
3.	"Take Me (As You Found Me)"	4:12
4.	"Closer"	3:46
5.	"You Belong Here"	4:22
6.	"Pray Tell"	3:47
7.	"The Art of War"	4:43
8.	"To the Wolves"	3:31
9.	"Down"	4:05
10.	"Depraved"	5:23
Total length:		41:04

B-sides
No.	Title	Length
1.	"All We Have" (iTunes exclusive)	3:32
2.	"I'd Like to Die" (independent in-store exclusive)	4:14
3.	"Impossible" (acoustic; Amazon MP3 exclusive)	4:23
4.	"Hell or High Water" (Newbury Comics exclusive)	3:25

== Personnel ==
- Stephen Christian – lead vocals, keyboards
- Joseph Milligan – lead guitar, vocals
- Christian McAlhaney – rhythm guitar, vocals
- Deon Rexroat – bass guitar
- Nathan Young – drums, percussion

Production

- Brendan O'Brien - production, engineering, string arrangements, mixing

== Chart performance ==
=== Album ===
Chart	Peak position
Australian Albums (ARIA)	41
US Billboard 200	9
US Top Christian Albums (Billboard)	1
US Top Alternative Albums (Billboard)	4
US Top Rock Albums (Billboard)	4

=== Singles ===
Single	Chart (2010)	Peak position
"Impossible"	U.S. Billboard Alternative Songs	5
"Impossible"	U.S. Billboard Rock Songs	14
