= Lost Songs (Anberlin album) =

Compilation album by Anberlin
- Released: November 20, 2007
- Genre: Alternative rock
- Length: 72:45
- Label: Tooth & Nail

Anberlin chronology
Cities (2007)	Lost Songs (2007)	New Surrender (2008)

Professional ratings
Review scores
Source	Rating
AllMusic	4/5 stars
Melodic	3.5/5 stars

Lost Songs is a compilation album from the alternative rock band Anberlin, released on November 20, 2007. It is a collection of covers, unreleased songs from previous album sessions and acoustic versions. This album is not entirely all-new, as most of the tracks have previously appeared on special editions of albums or other compilations.

== Track listing ==
1. "The Haunting" (Cities B-Side) - 5:49
2. "Uncanny" (Cities: Special Edition) - 3:27
3. "Like a Rolling Stone" (Listen to Bob Dylan: A Tribute Album) (Bob Dylan cover) - 3:44
4. "A Day Late (Acoustic)" (Purevolume exclusive) - 4:15
5. "Enjoy the Silence" (Punk Goes 90's Compilation) (Depeche Mode cover) - 3:30
6. "Cadence" (Acoustic) - 3:29
7. "Downtown Song" (Never Take Friendship Personal B-Side) - 2:59
8. "There Is a Light That Never Goes Out" (Cities: Special Edition) (The Smiths cover) - 4:15
9. "Dismantle.Repair." (Acoustic) - 4:34
10. "The Promise" (Cities: Special Edition) (When in Rome cover) - 3:14
11. "Naïve Orleans" (Acoustic) - 3:40
12. "Inevitable" (AOL Sessions Under Cover) - 3:46
13. "The Unwinding Cable Car" (AOL Sessions Under Cover) - 4:29
14. "Creep" (AOL Sessions Under Cover) (Radiohead cover) - 4:16
15. "Baby Please Come Home" (Happy Christmas Vol. 4 Compilation) - 2:43
16. "Readyfuels" (Demo) - 3:48
17. "Driving (Autobahn)" (Demo) - 3:58
18. "Everywhere in Between" (Demo) - 3:29
19. "Hidden Track" (Glass to the Arson MIDI) - 3:30
