= Cities (Anberlin album) =

Studio album by Anberlin
- Released: February 20, 2007
- Recorded: July–August 2006
- Studios: Compound and London Bridge Studio, Seattle, Washington.
- Genres: Alternative rock; emo; pop-punk
- Length: 46:31
- Labels: Tooth & Nail, Stomp, Howling Bull
- Producer: Aaron Sprinkle

Anberlin chronology
Godspeed EP (2006)	Cities (2007)	Lost Songs (2007)

Singles from Cities
- 1. "Godspeed" Released: December 26, 2006; 2. "The Unwinding Cable Car" Released: 2007

Cities is the third studio album by American alternative rock band Anberlin, released on February 20, 2007. The songs "Godspeed" and "The Unwinding Cable Car" were released as singles with accompanying music videos. The album debuted at No. 19 on the Billboard 200.

== Production ==
The band spent more than 40 days in the studio recording Cities and went back on tour on September 14 after listening to the finished work on the morning of September 13. Lead singer Stephen Christian kept fans posted on progress in the studio through the band's online forums. Anberlin asked fans to message their phone numbers to the band through their message board so they could call the fans and ask for advice on the album. The album was produced by Aaron Sprinkle, who also produced Anberlin's first two albums Blueprints for the Black Market and Never Take Friendship Personal.

== Promotion and pre-release ==
In late 2006, the band started previewing content for the album in various ways. The song "Godspeed" was released as a single on December 28, 2006. The band started playing "Hello Alone" at concerts under its working title, "The Lesser Thans." Anberlin also posted individual song previews on MySpace and PureVolume.

== Lyrical content ==
Stephen Christian stated in an interview that the lyrics throughout the band's discography were progressively becoming more mature. "The first CD (Blueprints for the Black Market) was childish in the manner that it was Man vs. World in the lyrics. The second (Never Take Friendship Personal) was Man Vs. Man. Cities is more adult in the manner that it's Man vs. Self."

== Release ==
Cities was released in the United States on February 20, 2007, as scheduled. It sold 34,000 units in its first week of release and debuted at No. 19 on the Billboard 200 chart and was well received by critics and fans. It also reached up to number seven on the iTunes Top Albums chart. Some pre-orders were shipped along with a seven-inch collector's vinyl EP.

A special-edition version of the album was also released. This version contains three additional tracks and a bonus DVD featuring a behind the scenes look of the making the album, interviews with the band members, and outtakes.

Except for digitally downloaded albums, each US copy of the album contained a "City Pass" insert. This insert states that it is the buyer's "gateway to the world" providing "free entry to over twenty cities". The inserts were tied to an online-entry contest (which closed on August 31, 2007).

== Critical reception ==
Professional ratings
Review scores
Source	Rating
AbsolutePunk	85%
Allmusic	3.5/5 stars
Alternative Press	3.5/5 stars
CCM Magazine	B−
Christian Broadcasting Network	4/5 spins
Christianity Today	4/5 stars
Cross Rhythms	9/10 squares
Jesus Freak Hideout	4/5 stars
Melodic	3/5 stars
New Release Tuesday	5/5 stars
The Phantom Tollbooth	4/5 stars
Sputnikmusic	5/5 stars

Cities garnered critical acclaim from Music critics. At Christianity Today, Christa Banister rated the album four stars, calling it a "great step in the right direction." Greg Prato of Allmusic rated the album three-and-a-half stars, commenting that "Nothing too groundbreaking here, but nothing cringe-worthy, either." At CCM Magazine, Andrew Scates graded it a B, noting that the album "if anything, evokes a hope for the future." Drew Beringer of AbsolutePunk rated the album an eighty-five-percent, highlighting that the album "converted" him about the band's music because it "display a vast improvement in every aspect." At Christian Broadcasting Network, Jennifer E. Jones rated the album four spins, affirming that "The best Anberlin album is here." Trevor Fitzgerald of Cross Rhythms rated the album a nine squares, stating that the listener will "find memorable songs, finely executed." At Sputnikmusic, SowingSeason rated the album a perfect five stars, saying that the album "shows Anberlin coming to a crossroads between youth and maturity and creating an absolute masterpiece of both." Founder, John DiBiase of Jesus Freak Hideout rated the album four stars, writing that the band "craft[ed] a pretty impressive batch of songs." At New Release Tuesday, Kevin Davis rated the album a perfect five stars, evoking that the album "demands to be experienced over and over." Also, Jonathan Francesco of New Release Tuesday rated the album a perfect five stars, calling it "an album of epic quality." The Phantom Tollbooth's James Morovich rated the album four stars, highlighting this as "Anberlin's most diverse project to date", and noting how the listener "will find a lot here to enjoy as well!" At Melodic, Kaj Roth rated the album three stars, remarking how the release offers "good songs that has elements of The Smiths, believe it or not."

=== Accolades ===
In 2008, the album was nominated for a Dove Award for Recorded Music Packaging of the Year at the 39th GMA Dove Awards.

== Track listing ==
All tracks are written by Stephen Christian and Joseph Milligan, except where noted.

No.	Title	Writer(s)	Length
1.	"(Début)"		1:27
2.	"Godspeed"		3:02
3.	"Adelaide"		3:14
4.	"A Whisper & a Clamor"		3:25
5.	"The Unwinding Cable Car"		4:17
6.	"There Is No Mathematics to Love and Loss"		3:11
7.	"Hello Alone"		4:00
8.	"Alexithymia"		3:23
9.	"Reclusion"		3:31
10.	"Inevitable"		3:47
11.	"Dismantle. Repair."	Christian; Milligan; Stephen Arnold	4:18
12.	"(*Fin)"		8:53

Special-edition bonus tracks
No.	Title	Writer(s)	Length
13.	"Uncanny"		3:28
14.	"There Is a Light That Never Goes Out (The Smiths Cover)"	Johnny Marr; Steven Morrissey	4:17
15.	"The Promise (When in Rome Cover)"	Clive Farrington; Michael Nuttall; Andrew Ramsbottom	3:17

Notes

- Special Edition version includes a DVD behind the scenes of the making of Cities.
- The bonus tracks are also included in the compilation album Lost Songs
- The album released in Japan had an extra track titled "The Haunting."
- "The Haunting" was later released on the Lost Songs album in late 2007, but Anberlin did not play the song live until September 28, 2010 at the New Orleans House of Blues.

== Personnel ==
Anberlin

- Stephen Christian – lead vocals, keyboards
- Joseph Milligan – lead guitar, vocals, keyboards, engineer
- Nathan Strayer – rhythm guitar, vocals
- Deon Rexroat – bass guitar
- Nathan Young – drums, percussion

Additional musicians

- Aaron Marsh – additional vocals on "Inevitable"
- Aaron Mlasko – additional percussion
- Matt Slocum – strings and choir arrangements

Artwork

- Ryan Clark for Invisible Creature – art direction & design
- Parker Young – photography
- Rob Michael Hugel – video documentary

Production

- Aaron Sprinkle – producer, engineer
- Randy Torres – engineering
- Mike Shipley – mixing
- Brian Wohlgermuth – mixing assistant
- Ted Jensen – mastering at Sterling Sound, New York City
- Aaron Mlasko – drum tech

Management

- Chad Johnson – A&R
- Kyle Griner – Management for The Arson Madia Group, Inc
- Nick Storch – U.S. Booking for The Arson Madia Group
- Mark Ngui h – European Booking for Primary Talent
- Mirk McKoy – Legal for Serling, Roook, & Ferrara

== Charts ==
Album

Chart (2007)	Peak position
Australian Albums Chart	59
US Billboard 200	19
US Billboard Digital Albums Chart	19
US Billboard Rock Albums Chart	6
US Billboard Top Christian Albums	2
US Billboard Tastemakers Albums Chart	3
