= Myzica =

American pop band

Myzica is an American pop band from Nashville, Tennessee, composed of vocalist Isaaca Byrd and producer Micah Tawlks.

Prior to founding Myzica, Byrd was the bassist in the folk rock group The Bridges, and Tawlks had worked with Matthew Perryman Jones. In April 2015, they released the single "Wait a Minute", and followed it with a self-titled, five-track EP on Peptalk Records in June of that same year. A full-length, ten-track album (which included all five of the songs from the EP) was issued on September 9, 2016.

The duo's sound is informed by 1980s-era pop music, including Cyndi Lauper, Whitney Houston, and the soundtracks of John Hughes films. They released a cover of "I Was Made for Loving You" by Kiss in 2015 and covered "Drive" by The Cars on their debut album.
