= Vital (Anberlin album) =

Studio album by Anberlin
- Released: October 16, 2012
- Recorded: 2011
- Studio: Electric Thunder Studios, Nashville TN, Sound Kitchen, Franklin, TN, Compound Recording, Seattle, WA
- Genre: Alternative rock; hard rock
- Length: 44:12
- Label: Universal Republic
- Producer: Aaron Sprinkle

Anberlin chronology
Dark Is the Way, Light Is a Place (2010)	Vital (2012)	Devotion (2013)

Singles from Vital
- 1. "Someone Anyone" Released: August 31, 2012; 2. "Self-Starter" Released: September 14, 2012; 3. "Unstable" Released: February 27, 2013

Vital is the sixth studio album by American alternative rock band Anberlin which was released on October 16, 2012. In interviews, vocalist Stephen Christian has stated the album has a youthful, energetic energy and features new influences for the band. Upon release, the album was met with favorable reviews from critics and fans alike. The album was re-released in 2013 as Devotion, adding the deluxe tracks from various retailers, new remixes, and a full live album.

== Critical reception ==
Professional ratings
Aggregate scores
Source	Rating
Metacritic	77/100
Review scores
Source	Rating
AllMusic	3.5/5 stars
Alternative Press	4/5 stars
CCM Magazine	4/5 stars
Christianity Today	3/5 stars
Cross Rhythms	10/10 squares
HM Magazine	4/5 stars
Indie Vision Music	4/5 stars
Jesus Freak Hideout	4.5/5 stars
New Release Tuesday	5/5 stars
Melodic	3.5/5 stars
Sputnikmusic	4.5/5 stars

Vital garnered generally positive reception from music critics. The review aggregator website Metacritic gives a weighted average rating to an album based upon the selected independent mainstream reviews it utilizes, and the album has a Metascore of a 77 out of 100 based on five reviews.

At Alternative Press, Evan Lucy stating that "Vital [is] the most well-rounded Anberlin album to date." Matt Collar of AllMusic saying that "Ultimately, while Vital is Anberlin's most challenging album to date, as the title implies, it is perhaps the band's most rewarding album." At AbsolutePunk, Jack Appleby writing that "Calling Vital a career-defining record isn't a stretch in the least", which it "is the best record in Anberlin’s 10 year career, bar none." SowingSeason of Sputnikmusic remarking that "Even if it isn’t the best album they’ve ever made, Vital is perhaps the smartest", that contains some "otherworldly vocals." At Melodic, Johan Wippsson commenting that "the band has kept the energy that characterizes their sound and overall it’s an album that shows that the band is in the right direction."

At CCM Magazine, Andy Argyrakis saying that "Not only does the collection boast unbridled energy and spiritually-infused emotion, but it also serves as an official bookend to the group's crown jewel Cities" Stephen Luff of Cross Rhythms writing that "there are some truly outstanding tracks here", and that is why he states Anberlin "have delivered a gem of an album." At HM Magazine, Doug Van Pelt stating that "Vital has progressively shown the band churning out polished, melodic yet aggressive tunes that ever so slightly expand on the band's trademark sound", and that they "avoiding anything stale." Jeremy V. Jones of Christianity Today remarking that "Vital is enhanced by female backing vocals and, more significantly, washed with big, splashy synthesizer."

At Jesus Freak Hideout, Roger Gelwicks saying that "Standing on its own merit, Vital is a particularly durable alternative rock release with eleven tracks of excellence", which is why "Vital forcefully satisfies to the very last drop." John DiBiase of Jesus Freak Hideout writing that "Vital is definitely amid Anberlin's best records yet and [...] this is a truly refreshing album." At New Release Tuesday, Jonathan Francesco saying that "Vital hits all the right notes at just the right times and you're left with the closest thing to a flawless record you'll find this year. Vital is the definition of a band in their element." Carter Fraser of Indie Vision Music remarking that "Vital is as accomplished as anything Anberlin have released to date, simply in another direction."

At Artist Direct, Rick Florino writing that "Vital sees Anberlin's heart beating faster and stronger than ever. There's lots of blood, and that's a good thing…" Tyler Hess of Christian Music Zine stating that "Vital holds up well on it's [sic] own and shouldn’t be missed." At Louder Than The Music, Jono Davies saying that "So close, but not perfect yet." Jonathan Anderson of The New Review commenting that "Anberlin has successfully created an album that will immediately please fans of both their old and new work, and at the same time, Vital will attract brand new fans"; however, Anderson will not "go so far as to say that it blows the esteemed Cities out of the water, but [he] believe[s] Vital has taken a careful step into first place as the pinnacle release of their career."

== Track listing ==
No.	Title	Length
1.	"Self-Starter" (featuring Julia Marie)	3:17
2.	"Little Tyrants"	3:21
3.	"Other Side"	4:06
4.	"Someone Anyone"	3:29
5.	"Intentions"	3:09
6.	"Innocent"	4:44
7.	"Desires"	3:24
8.	"Type Three"	3:57
9.	"Orpheum"	3:52
10.	"Modern Age"	4:13
11.	"God, Drugs & Sex" (featuring Christie DuPree)	6:15
Total length:		44:12

iTunes exclusive
No.	Title	Length
12.	"Unstable"	3:34

Australian exclusive
No.	Title	Length
12.	"Safe Here"	3:40

Best Buy Deluxe edition
No.	Title	Length
12.	"Said Too Much"	3:31
13.	"No Love to Speak"	4:09

"Pretend to Be Friends", a 25-minute short film with music composed by the band, comes on a DVD with the Best Buy deluxe edition, but it is actually 18:59 in length.

== Personnel ==
- Stephen Christian – lead vocals, keyboards
- Joseph Milligan – lead guitar, vocals
- Christian McAlhaney – rhythm guitar, vocals
- Deon Rexroat – bass guitar
- Nathan Young – drums, percussion

Additional musicians

- Julia Marie – vocals on "Self-Starter"
- Christie DuPree – vocals on "God, Drugs & Sex"

Production

- Aaron Sprinkle – producer, engineering, mixing, mastering

== Charts ==
=== Album ===
Chart (2012)	Peak position
Australian Albums (ARIA)	45
US Billboard 200	16
US Top Christian Albums (Billboard)	1
US Top Rock Albums (Billboard)	6
US Top Alternative Albums (Billboard)	3
US Digital Albums (Billboard)	9
US Indie Store Album Sales (Billboard)	22
