= Stephen Christian =

American singer and songwriter

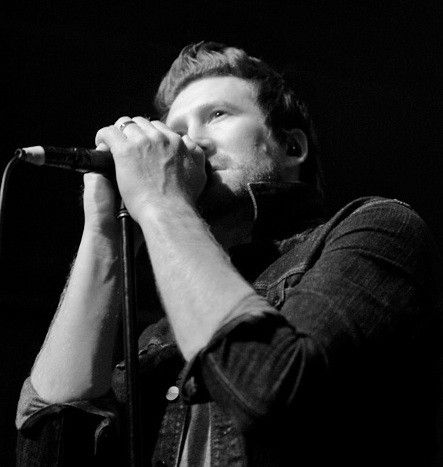
- Christian in 2011

Background information
- Born: Stephen Christian Arnold; Kalamazoo, Michigan, U.S.
- Genres: Alternative rock; acoustic rock; pop punk; Christian rock
- Occupations: Singer; songwriter; pastor
- Instruments: Vocals; keyboards; guitar
- Years active: 1998–present
- Label: Tooth & Nail
- Member of: Anchor & Braille
- Formerly of: Anberlin; SaGoh 24/7

Stephen Christian Arnold is an American singer and songwriter best known as the lead vocalist of the alternative rock band Anberlin, as well as the vocalist of his acoustic side-project Anchor & Braille. He and his bandmates started Anberlin in 2002, after the demise of their previous group, known as SaGoh 24/7. He is one of the main songwriters for Anberlin alongside Joseph Milligan, and with the band has released seven albums before their initial disbandment in 2014 and began working on an eighth album in 2020. Many of the albums in the Anberlin discography have peaked in the top ten on various Billboard charts.

He founded the non-profit and humanitarian-oriented band Faceless International, and is the founder of Wood Water Records, the home of Anchor & Braille. Christian wrote and self-published the memoir The Orphaned Anything's (2008). Christian also started the solo project Anchor & Braille in 2007, and their debut album Felt, produced by Aaron Marsh of Copeland, was released in 2009. Felt debuted at number 30 on the Billboard Top Heatseekers chart. They released a second album, The Quiet Life, in 2012, with Christian again handling vocals and songwriting. A reviewer on Absolutepunk called The Quiet Life "a chaotic beauty of an album as well as [Christian's] most personal and eloquent effort to date."

On October 30, 2018, Calvary Church of Clearwater, Florida announced that Christian will assume the role of director of worship and creative arts in January 2019, and on August 26, 2019, Christian announced that he would be the campus pastor for Grace Family Church's South Tampa Campus.

== Early life and education ==
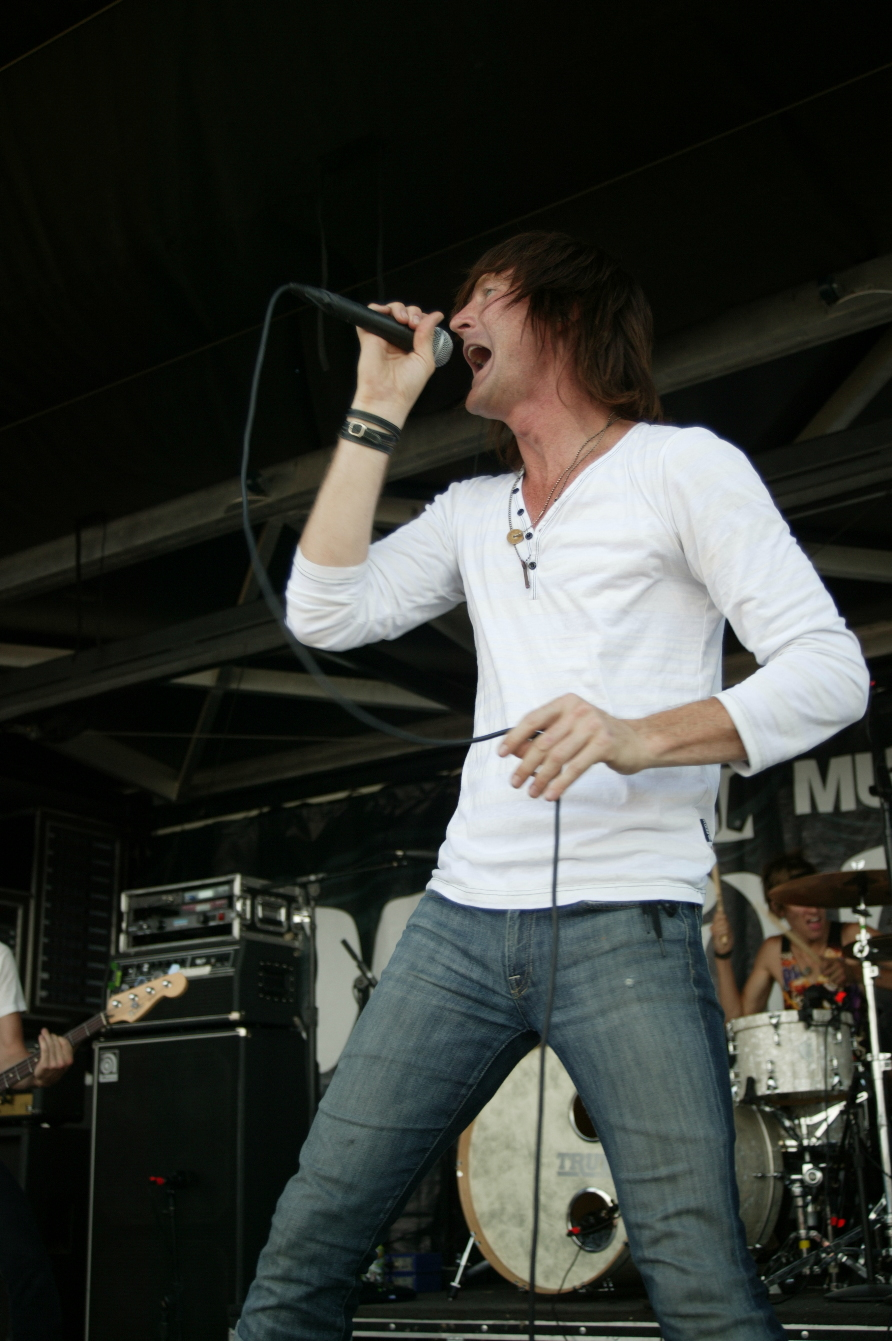
Performing with Anberlin in Las Cruces, NM at the 2007 Warped Tour

Stephen Christian Arnold was born on July 28, 1980 in Kalamazoo, Michigan. As of 2025, He is married to Julia Marie Arnold and they share 3 daughters together. In 2023, Stephen made a public statement that he will be taking a break from touring with Anberlin to focus on his family (wife and children) and community, which includes his work as a full-time pastor.

At some point in his early life, Christian moved to Winter Haven, Florida. Christian attended Winter Haven High School along with bandmates Deon Rexroat and Joseph Milligan. During high school, the three formed the punk band SaGoh 24/7 with Joey Bruce, which eventually transformed into Anberlin. Christian's younger brother Paul was an influence on some of the band's music. They released two albums, Servants After God's Own Heart (1999), and Then I Corrupt Youth (2001), with Christian singing lead vocals on both.

Christian is a graduate from University of Central Florida and the Florida State University College of Law, with a bachelor's degree in Psychology. He attended college to study non-profits, with plans to work for Habitat for Humanity or UNICEF, but Anberlin was signed a month after he graduated.

== Career ==
=== 2002–2014, 2018–2026: Anberlin ===
Following the signing of Anberlin, Christian wrote many of the songs on each of the band's albums. Anberlin has released seven albums: Blueprints for the Black Market, Never Take Friendship Personal, Cities, New Surrender, and Dark Is the Way, Light Is a Place, Vital, and Lowborn. Anberlin also released a compilation album, Lost Songs. They went on hiatus in 2014 before returning in 2018 and releasing two EPs in 2022 and 2023, before Christian stepped back from touring in 2023 and fully departed from the band in 2026.

Christian wrote a memoir, The Orphaned Anything's, which was self-published via iUniverse in early 2008.

=== 2007–2014: Anchor & Braille, Wood Water Records ===
He is also the founder of Anchor & Braille's label, Wood Water Records, which is distributed through Universal Music Group, which Anberlin is signed to. He founded the acoustic group Anchor & Braille, and they released a 7" single in 2007. He wrote all songs and performed vocals on their 2009 album Felt, which was recorded in 2008. The album was released through Christian's own label Wood Water Records and Federal Distribution on August 4, 2009 and was produced, engineered and mixed by Aaron Marsh from fellow Florida-based band Copeland. Felt debuted at number 30 on the Billboard Top Heatseekers chart.

His 2012 album with Anchor & Braille, The Quiet Life, was well-received by critics, with most of the praise directed at Christian's songwriting. Of "Goes Without Saying", Artist Direct called it "One of the most brilliant and beautiful entries into Christian's catalog, and it's the perfect prelude to the sonic majesty contained in The Quiet Life."

=== 2015–present: Worship leader and pastor ===
After what was purported to be a final world tour with Anberlin, Christian followed what he described as "God's leading" to serve as director of worship at Calvary Chapel in Albuquerque, New Mexico. In May 2015, Christian was a contestant on The Price Is Right, dressing up like host Drew Carey circa his appearance on Star Search.

The Calvary Church in Clearwater, Florida announced that Christian would return to the Tampa Bay region to assume the role of director of worship and creative arts on January 6, 2019. He accepted the role of campus pastor of Grace Family Church's South Tampa Campus on August 26, 2019.

== Publishing history ==
Books

- The Orphaned Anything's (February 2008)

== Discography ==
=== With SaGoh 24/7 ===
Studio albums

- 1999: Servants After God's Own Heart – lead vocals
- 2001: Then I Corrupt Youth – lead vocals

=== With Anberlin ===
Studio albums

- 2003: Blueprints for the Black Market – lead vocals
- 2005: Never Take Friendship Personal – lead vocals
- 2007: Cities – lead vocals
- 2007: Lost Songs – lead vocals
- 2008: New Surrender – lead vocals, guitar, piano, synthesizer
- 2010: Dark Is the Way, Light Is a Place – lead vocals
- 2012: Vital – lead vocals
- 2013: Devotion – lead vocals
- 2014: Lowborn – lead vocals
- 2024: Vega – lead vocals

=== With Anchor & Braille ===
Albums by Anchor & Braille
Year	Album title	Release details	Chart peaks
Year	Album title	Release details	US Heat
2009	Felt	Released: August 4, 2009; Label: Tooth & Nail Records; Format: CD, digital	30
2012	The Quiet Life	Released: July 31, 2012; Label: Tooth & Nail Records; Format: CD, digital	11
2016	Songs for the Late Night Drive Home	Released: February 9, 2016; Label: Tooth & Nail Records; Format: CD, digital	—
"—" denotes a recording that did not chart or was not released in that territory.

=== As a solo artist ===
- 2017: Wildfires
- 2021: Spirited

=== Collaborations ===
The following is an incomplete list of songs that have Stephen Christian featured as either a vocalist or songwriter:

- 2009: Craig Owens – With Love EP (featured vocalist on the song "Products of Poverty")
- 2011: Hyland – "The One That Got Away" (featuring Stephen Christian during the chorus)
- 2015: Fireflight – "Safety" (featuring Stephen Christian), on Innova
- Horsell Common – "I'm Dead" (featuring Stephen Christian)
- 2022: Zakk Cash - “Goodbye” (featured vocalist)
- Esteban – "Follow" (featuring Stephen Christian)
- Greek Fire – "I'm Afraid of Americans" (featuring Stephen Christian)
- Number One Gun – "Disappear" (featuring Stephen Christian), on This Is All We Know

== See also ==
- List of singer-songwriters
