= Devotion (Anberlin album) =

Compilation album by Anberlin
- Released: October 15, 2013
- Label: Big3
- Producer: Aaron Sprinkle, Anberlin

Anberlin chronology
| Vital (2012) | Devotion (2013) | Lowborn (2014) |

Singles from Devotion
- 1. "City Electric" Released: September 24, 2013

Devotion is a compilation album by American alternative rock band Anberlin that was released on October 15, 2013, a year after its predecessor Vital. The album is a rework of the band's sixth studio album, Vital which came out the year before. Devotion is the band's fourth compilation album and tenth overall effort of their career and features the original track-listing of Vital, along with three new self-produced songs: "City Electric", "Dead American", and "IJSW", as well as songs from exclusive releases of Vital for iTunes, Best Buy and the Australian market. The deluxe version contains three discs, disc one being the reworked version of Vital, disc two is a compilation of remixes of the album's songs, while the third disc is a DVD containing a full concert at Music Hall of Williamsburg from mid-2012. The standard edition includes only the reworked "Vital" disc and a CD of the Williamsburg audio. The album was first announced on the band's official website in September 2013, where they revealed they would be releasing "a collection we're calling Devotion: Vital Special Edition".

== Track listing ==
Disc One: Devotion: Vital special edition
| No. | Title | Length |
|---|---|---|
| 1. | "Self-Starter" (featuring Julia Marie) | 3:17 |
| 2. | "Little Tyrants" | 3:21 |
| 3. | "Other Side" | 4:06 |
| 4. | "City Electric" (New track) | 4:28 |
| 5. | "Someone Anyone" | 3:29 |
| 6. | "Unstable" (Vital iTunes bonus track) | 3:35 |
| 7. | "Intentions" | 3:09 |
| 8. | "Innocent" | 4:19 |
| 9. | "Dead American" (New track) | 3:10 |
| 10. | "Desires" | 3:24 |
| 11. | "Said Too Much" (Vital Best Buy deluxe edition bonus track) | 3:32 |
| 12. | "IJSW" (New track) | 5:26 |
| 13. | "Type Three" | 3:57 |
| 14. | "No Love to Speak" (Vital Best Buy deluxe edition bonus track) | 4:09 |
| 15. | "Orpheum" | 3:52 |
| 16. | "Safe Here" (Vital Australian deluxe edition bonus track) | 3:41 |
| 17. | "Modern Age" | 4:13 |
| 18. | "God, Drugs & Sex" (featuring Christie DuPree) | 6:15 |
| Total length: | | 71:48 |

Disc Two: Devotion: Vital Remixed
| No. | Title | Length |
|---|---|---|
| 1. | "Someone Anyone (Spacebrother Remix)" | 4:41 |
| 2. | "Desires (Spacebrother Remix)" | 5:33 |
| 3. | "God, Drugs & Sex (Resist Temptation Remix)" | 7:11 |
| 4. | "Innocent (Joseph Milligan Remix)" | 4:07 |
| 5. | "Intentions (Joseph Milligan Remix)" | 3:54 |
| 6. | "Little Tyrants (Joseph Milligan Remix)" | 4:08 |
| 7. | "Other Side (Celebrated Heroes Remix)" | 3:39 |
| 8. | "Self-Starter (JT Daly Remix)" | 4:55 |
| 9. | "Said Too Much (Joseph Milligan Remix)" | 3:38 |
| 10. | "Orpheum (JT Daly Remix)" | 4:39 |
| 11. | "Type Three (Leverage Models Remix)" | 5:44 |
| 12. | "Unstable (Nick Rad Remix)" | 5:41 |
| 13. | "Modern Age (Nick Rad Remix)" | 5:12 |
| Total length: | | 63:02 |

Disc Three: Devotion: Live from the Music Hall of Williamsburg
| No. | Title | Length |
|---|---|---|
| 1. | "Take Me (As You Found Me)" (Live) | 6:24 |
| 2. | "A Day Late" (Live) | 3:47 |
| 3. | "Inevitable" (Live) | 4:57 |
| 4. | "Type Three" (Live) | 5:22 |
| 5. | "Breaking" (Live) | 5:08 |
| 6. | "Alexithymia" (Live) | 4:03 |
| 7. | "Dismantle.Repair." (Live) | 5:16 |
| 8. | "I'd Like To Die" (Live) | 4:36 |
| 9. | "Down" (Live) | 5:15 |
| 10. | "The Unwinding Cable Car" (Live) | 6:49 |
| 11. | "Feel Good Drag" (Live) | 4:26 |
| 12. | "Naive Orleans" (Live) | 4:04 |
| 13. | "Impossible" (Live) | 5:45 |
| Total length: | | 65:52 |

== Release history ==
The band officially released Devotion on October 16, 2013. The album has spawned three new songs. "City Electric", was the first single released on September 24, 2013 and an official lyric video of the single was released on the band's YouTube page the same day.
