= Anberlin =

American alternative rock band

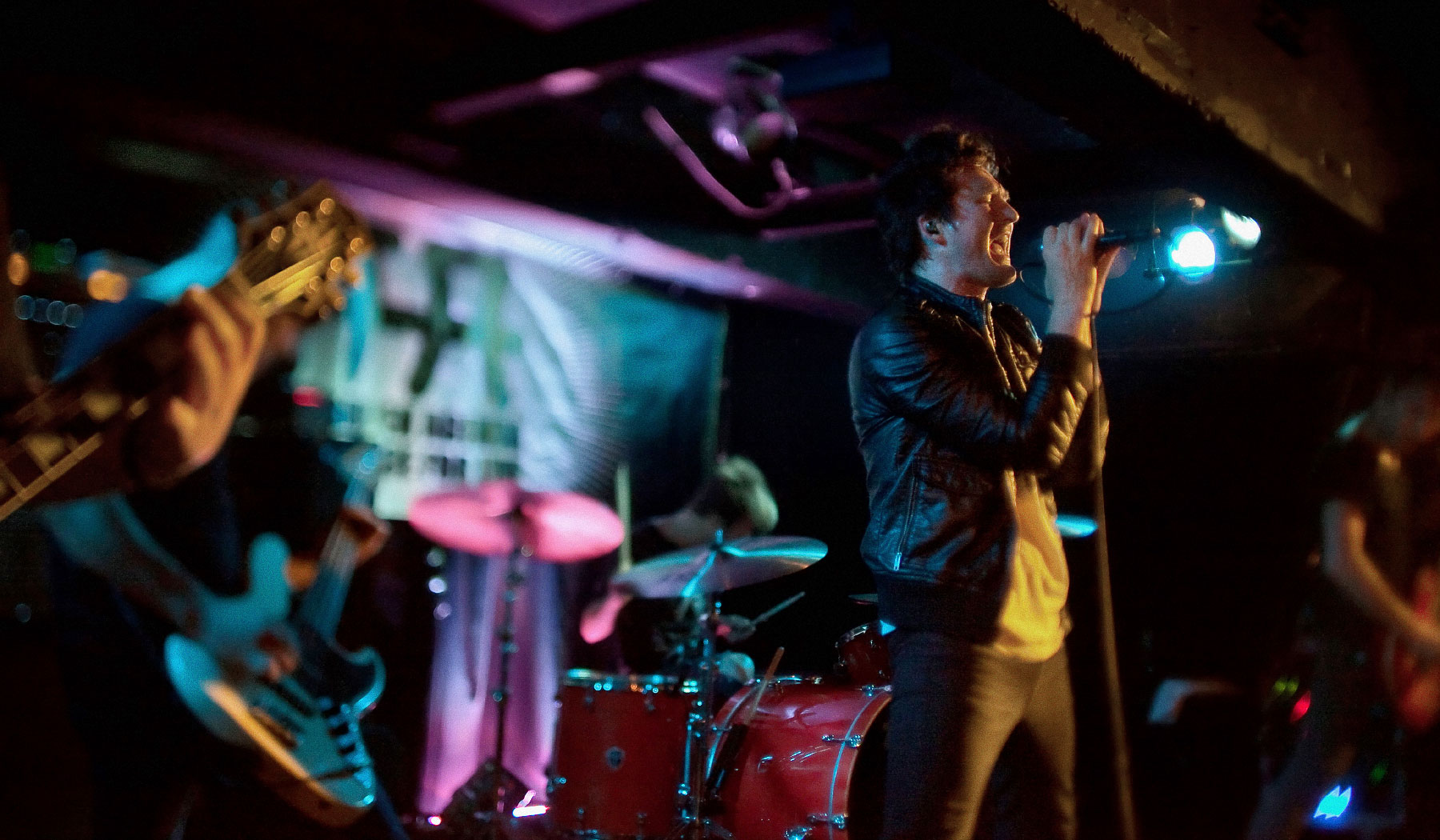
- Anberlin performing in Hong Kong, 2011

Background information
- Origin: Winter Haven, Florida, U.S.
- Genres: Alternative rock; emo
- Years active: 2002–2014; 2018–present
- Labels: Universal Republic; Island UK; Tooth & Nail; UNFD; Big3; Equal Vision
- Spinoffs: Anchor & Braille; Carrollhood; Loose Talk; Sins
- Members: Matty Mullins; Deon Rexroat; Joseph Milligan; Nathan Young; Christian McAlhaney
- Past members: Stephen Christian; Joey Bruce; Nathan Strayer
- Website: www.anberlin.com

Anberlin is an American alternative rock band formed in Winter Haven, Florida, in 2002. The band consists of lead vocalist Matty Mullins, guitarists Joseph Milligan and Christian McAlhaney, bassist Deon Rexroat, and drummer Nathan Young.

Members of Anberlin originally formed a band under the name SaGoh 24/7 in 1998, releasing two studio albums before disbanding, with the members having a change in musical direction and name. Anberlin was formed in 2002; within a year of forming, they had signed with semi-independent record label Tooth & Nail Records and released their debut album, Blueprints for the Black Market. In 2005, the band released their second album, Never Take Friendship Personal. The band's third album, Cities, was released in 2007, and became their first album to reach the top 20 of the Billboard 200, selling 34,000 copies in its debut week.

Anberlin signed with major label Universal Republic in 2007 and in 2008 released New Surrender, which peaked at No. 13 on the Billboard 200, with the first single, "Feel Good Drag", claiming No. 1 on the Alternative Songs chart, after 29 weeks in the chart. Prior to the 2010 release of their fifth studio album, Dark Is the Way, Light Is a Place, Anberlin had sold over 1,000,000 albums. Their sixth studio album Vital was released October 16, 2012, and rereleased on Big3 Records under the title Devotion a year later, October 15, 2013.

On January 16, 2014, it was announced that Anberlin would be disbanding in 2014 after recording their seventh studio album, Lowborn, on their original label, Tooth & Nail Records, and touring one last time. After performing concerts in late 2018, the group reunited to tour through 2019. In May 2020, Christian mentioned they were working on new material. Anberlin released their new EP Silverline on July 29, 2022.

In October 2023, Stephen Christian announced he was taking an indefinite hiatus from touring with the band and was replaced by Memphis May Fire's Matty Mullins. As of 2026, Christian is no longer listed as a member of the band in official band press releases.

== History ==
=== SaGoh 24/7 and the origins of Anberlin (1998–2002) ===
Lead singer Stephen Christian met bassist Deon Rexroat while they were both in high school, and they formed a punk band called SaGoh 24/7. Drummer Sean Hutson and guitarist Joseph Milligan joined the group as well. The band released two albums, Servants After God's Own Heart (1999), and Then I Corrupt Youth (2001), both under Rescue Records. After the albums sold only 1,300 units, Hutson left the band to start a family, and Nathan Young was brought in as a replacement.

Christian, Milligan and Rexroat began working on a side project, marking the beginning of the end for SaGoh 24/7. The side project's sound transformed after a suggestion from Milligan to develop more of a rock sound for Anberlin. They used money left over from shows SaGoh had performed and teamed up with producer Matt Goldman to record five demos. The demos that were then posted on PureVolume (which was mp3.com at the time). On the advice of friends, including Chad Johnson, and Timmy McTague from Underoath, the band signed with Tooth & Nail Records.

=== Blueprints for the Black Market and Never Take Friendship Personal (2002–2005) ===
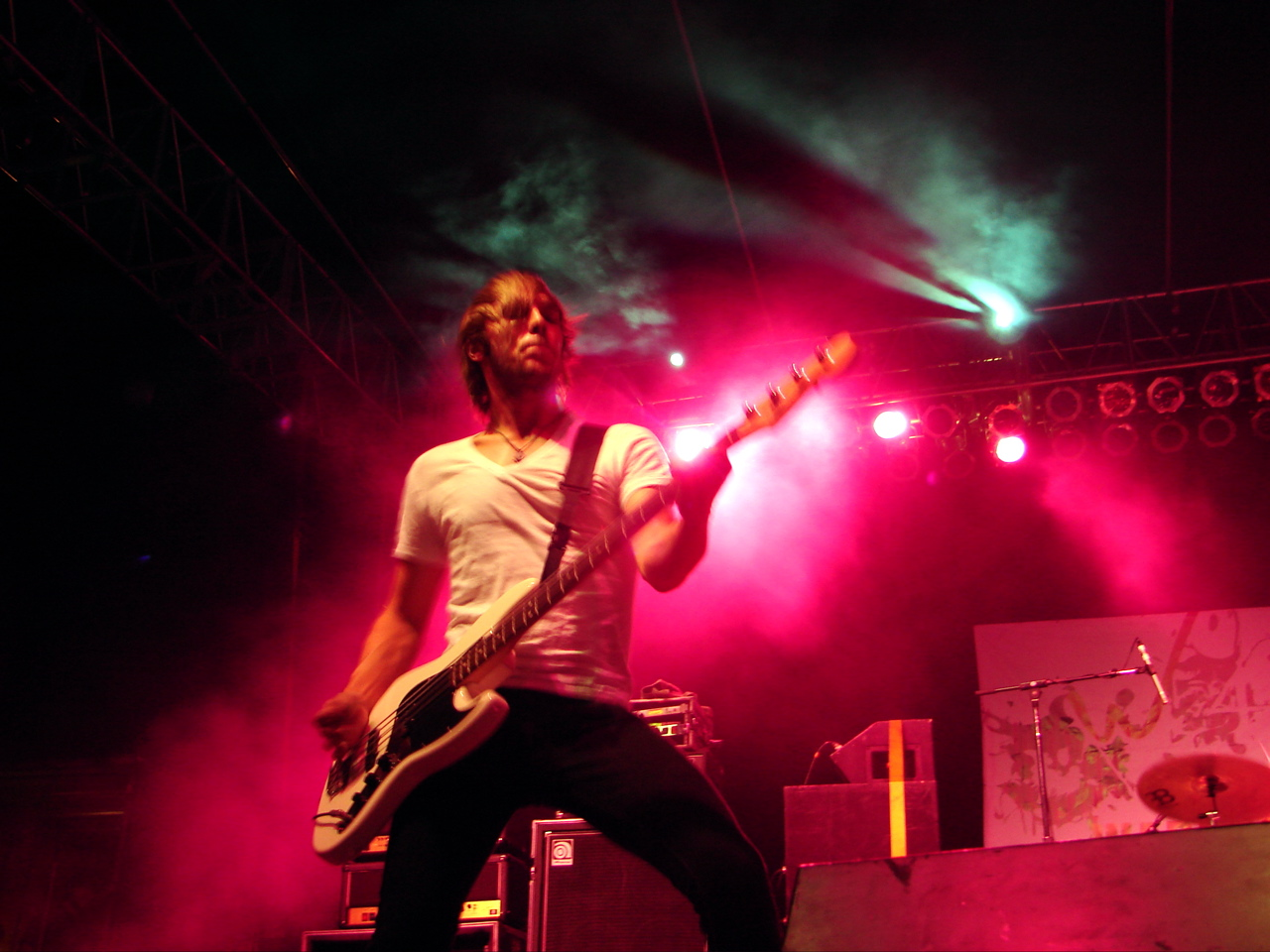
Bassist Deon Rexroat performing at Purple Door in August 2007

Out of the five demos Anberlin recorded with Matt Goldman, three were eventually chosen to be reworked for the band's debut album, the lead single "Readyfuels", "Driving" (later renamed "Autobahn") and "Foreign Language". Another song, "Embrace the Dead", was also recorded as a demo track and is often mistaken as an Anberlin song, however, the song didn't make it onto the band's debut album as it didn't constitute the stylistic direction the band wanted to head in.

After hearing demos from the band Acceptance, Anberlin chose to record their debut album with the same producer, Aaron Sprinkle, creating a relationship that would last the entire duration of their time with Tooth & Nail Records. Barely a year after their formation, their first album as a new band was entitled Blueprints for the Black Market (2003). It failed to chart, but spurred on by their debut single, "Readyfuels", the album sold over 60,000 units. They toured steadily with other bands in their label.

Rhythm guitarist Joey Bruce was eventually ejected from the band. According to Christian, he was "all about sex, drugs and rock & roll", and was going in a different direction than the rest of the band. After several failed replacements, Nathan Strayer from The Mosaic took over rhythm guitar duties.

Anberlin released their follow-up to Blueprints, Never Take Friendship Personal, in early 2005, again produced by Aaron Sprinkle. Charting at No. 144 on the Billboard 200, the album brought the band closer to the mainstream. NTFP was generally more well received by critics than Blueprints for the Black Market. Before its release, the band promoted the album by releasing a track per week on their PureVolume and MySpace website accounts, as well as on their own website. Two singles were released from the album: "A Day Late" and "Paperthin Hymn". Both were reasonably successful on alternative rock radio, with the latter peaking at the No. 38 position on the Hot Modern Rock Tracks chart.

Anberlin participated in a number of compilations during this time, recording covers of Bob Dylan's "Like a Rolling Stone", Depeche Mode's "Enjoy the Silence," and the song "Christmas (Baby Please Come Home)".

=== Cities and Lost Songs (2005–2007) ===
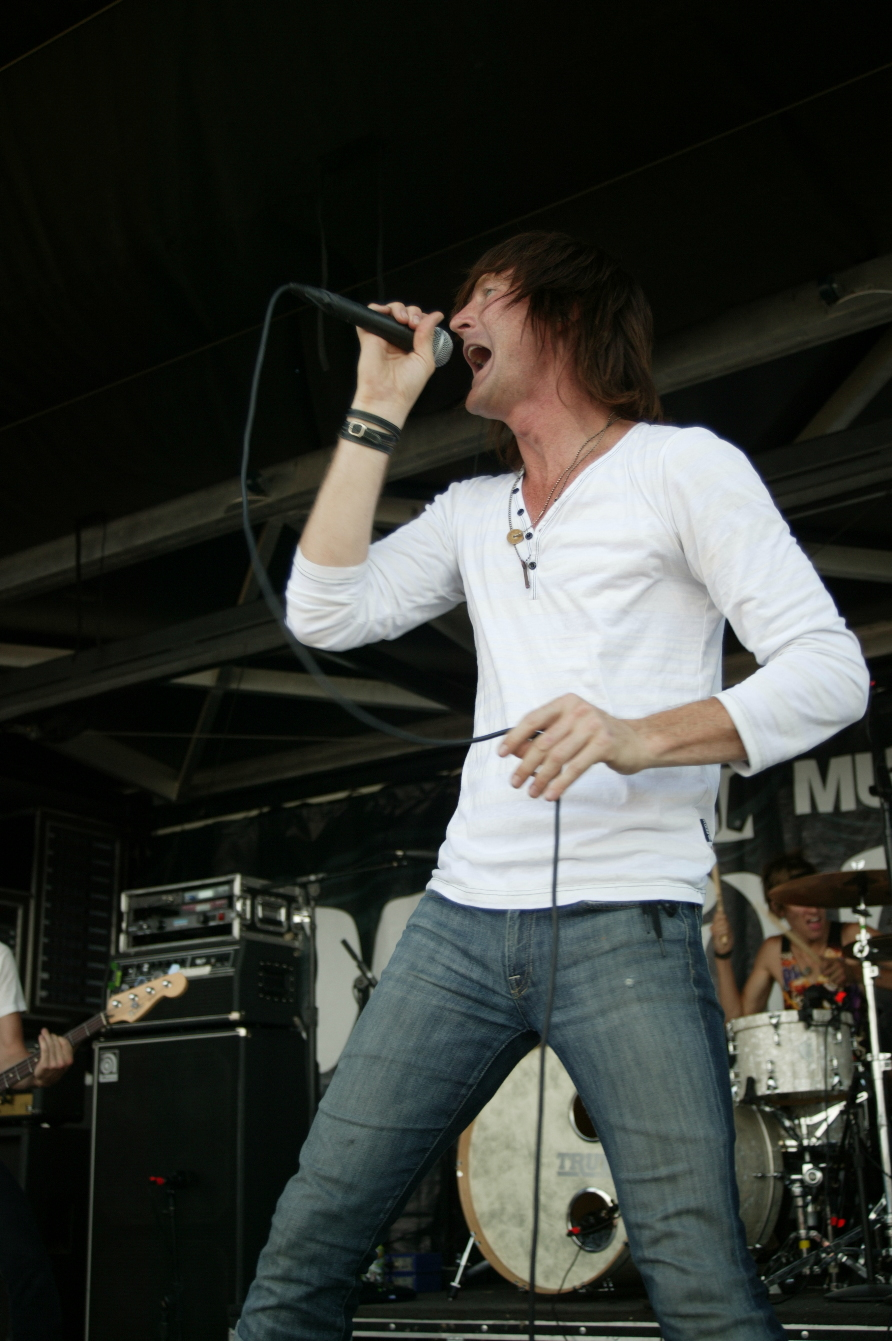
Performing in Las Cruces, NM at the 2007 Warped Tour

Anberlin's third album produced by Aaron Sprinkle was released in early 2007 under the title Cities. It sold 34,000 copies in its first week of release, debuted at No. 19 on the Billboard 200 chart, and, like their previous album, received fairly positive reviews from critics. Before the release of Cities, the band released Godspeed EP exclusively through the iTunes Store in late 2006 to give a preview to the new album. In support of the album, Anberlin held their first headlining tour, supported by Bayside, Meg & Dia and Jonezetta.

In an interview about the album, Christian commented that the lyrics throughout the band's discography are progressively becoming more mature. "The first CD (Blueprints for the Black Market) was childish in the manner that it was Man vs. World in the lyrics. The second (Never Take Friendship Personal) was Man Vs. Man. Cities is more adult in the manner that it's Man Vs. Self. Cities was the most anticipated album on Jesus Freak Hideout's Most Anticipated Albums of 2007.

Three to four weeks before the release of Cities, it was announced that guitarist Nathan Strayer amicably left the band to go back to the Mosaic and that Christian McAlhaney, formerly of the band Acceptance, would take over as the new guitarist.

A compilation album of unreleased material, called Lost Songs, was released on November 20, 2007. It features B-sides, demos, covers, and acoustic versions of their previous songs as well as other tracks recorded at Sessions@AOL.

=== Universal Republic signing and New Surrender (2007–2009) ===
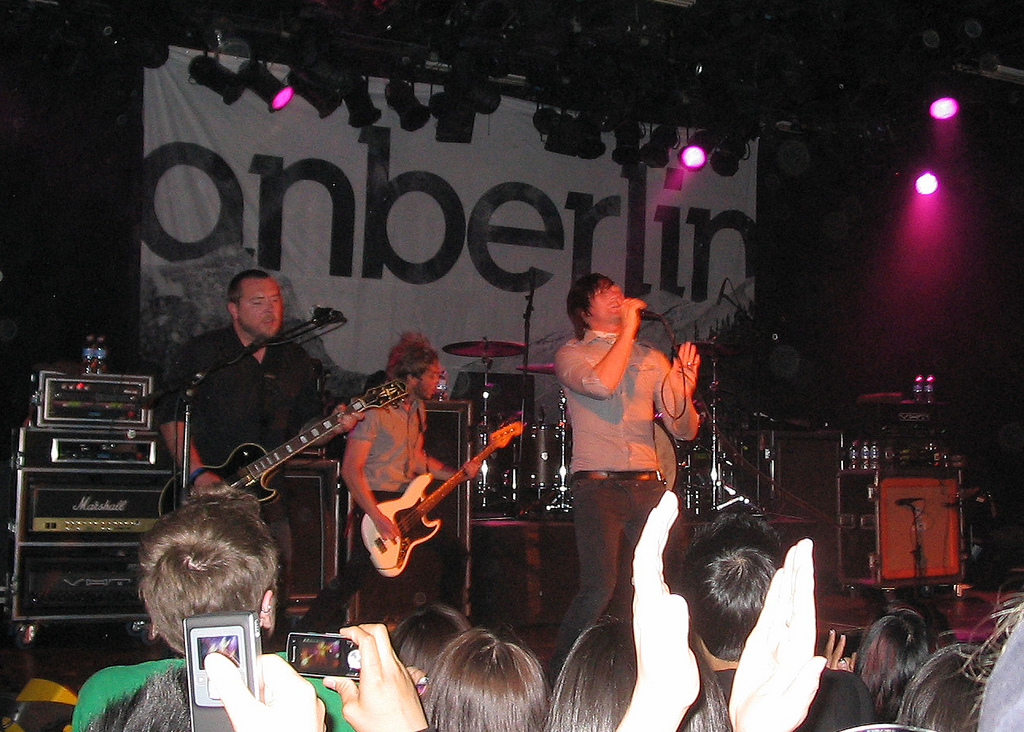
Performing at the Commodore Ballroom in May 2009

The band signed to Universal Republic on August 16, 2007, and soon after began to write material for their major-label debut, entitled New Surrender, which was released on September 30, 2008. This was the band's first album to not be distributed through Tooth & Nail Records or produced by Aaron Sprinkle. The first song to be heard from the new album was tentatively titled "Bittersweet Memory" during its initial live performances; it was later renamed to "Breaking", with an acoustic remix of the song included on USB wristbands sold exclusively during the 2008 Warped Tour. On July 11, 2008, the band showcased a second new song called "Disappear" on their MySpace profile. The first actual single from the album was the re-recorded "Feel Good Drag" which was set to go to radio on August 18 - eventually being released on August 26.

The band booked eight weeks of recording sessions with noted producer Neal Avron (New Found Glory, Yellowcard, Fall Out Boy) in early February 2008. Stephen Christian stated in an interview, "We're very excited about working with Neal; I think our fans are going to be pleased when they hear the final result." Christian also discussed the difficulties in writing this record. "When you try to write 29 songs lyrically you find yourself topically working in circles; I only go through so much in one year, but needlessly I have dedicated myself to begin searching books, art, and friends for new directions." During the recording process, the band set up a live webcam in the studio so fans could watch them record the album via the band's MySpace profile. New Surrender was placed at the No. 2 spot on Jesus Freak Hideout's 25 Most Anticipated Albums of 2008.

In the week of its release, the album sold 36,000 units, entering the Billboard 200 chart at No. 13. It also placed at No. 5 on the Top Current Rock chart, according to a Universal Republic press release. In support of the album, the band embarked on a fall headlining U.S. tour alongside Scary Kids Scaring Kids, Straylight Run, and There For Tomorrow. Kyle Flynn, formerly of the band Acceptance, joined the band while on tour doing keys, loops, acoustic guitar, and background vocals. The band then traveled to the United Kingdom where they supported Elliot Minor and played a handful of headlining shows with Furthest Drive Home and Data.Select.Party.

Anberlin went into the studio to record several tracks, including a cover of the New Order song "True Faith", which was made available online. The band also recorded a cover of the Danzig song "Mother", which they performed during an interview with Billboard. After supporting Taking Back Sunday throughout May and June 2009, the band planned to start writing the follow-up to New Surrender in the summer, but the release date was undetermined, as the band needed to give the new material the proper time and effort. They also undertook an Australian tour in August, alongside The Academy Is.... A b-side from New Surrender, "A Perfect Tourniquet", was released on the soundtrack for the TV show 90210. The cover of New Order's "True Faith" was released to radio airplay on November 17, the same day as the Tooth & Nail released Blueprints for City Friendships: The Anberlin Anthology, which is a 33-song, three-album set including all the songs from their Tooth & Nail studio albums.

=== Dark Is the Way, Light Is a Place (2010–2011) ===
In an interview with the South Florida Sun-Sentinel in December 2009, it was revealed by lead singer Stephen Christian that the band were tentatively due to enter the studio in the beginning of 2010, with a release probable later in the year. He said "it looks like we are going to go to the studio in January, February or March, right around that time". Drummer Nathan Young stated that the album would be "less poppy" and "darker". Christian posted on his Twitter account in December 2009, that his choice for an album name was "a go" but did not reveal the name.

The band entered Blackbird Studios, Nashville, to begin recording the album in March 2010. It was announced on March 3 that the band would be working with Grammy Award-winning producer, Brendan O'Brien. The tracking of the album was completed on April 9, with mixing commencing on April 13, 2010. In an April 2010 interview with MyMag, Christian stated that the album's release date is "looking like late July or early August" 2010. However, in a May 2010 interview with Spin Magazine, McAlhaney stated that the album would be released in September 2010.

In early June 2010, the album's release date was confirmed to be September 21, 2010. The band also began exposing their new music, with videos of live performances of the album's songs appearing online. A press release revealed on June 17 that Anberlin's fifth studio album would be titled Dark Is the Way, Light Is a Place, taking its title from a line in Dylan Thomas’ "Poem on His Birthday". Along with the disclosure of a track listing, the press release also announced the album's lead single, "Impossible", which went to radio play on July 12, 2010.

When asked about the possible impact of the new album, Stephen replied 'I feel like we're on the brink of something... either world domination or destruction, but either way we're on the brink'.

Anberlin supported Thirty Seconds to Mars on their Closer to the Edge Tour with CB7 during April and May 2011.

=== Vital and Devotion (2012–2013) ===
In an interview with Common Revolt, Stephen Christian stated that the band had begun work on their next album. A few songs had been written, including one with the working title "Control" (later renamed Orpheum), and a song influenced by the events in Egypt (later confirmed to be "Someone Anyone").

The band announced via Facebook and e-mail in February 2012 that they would be returning to Aaron Sprinkle to record their upcoming album. The band recorded their first three albums with Sprinkle; not only is he a good friend of the band but also a fan favorite. The band will begin recording around the start of March, and are not expected to be finished until May. In a 2011 interview, Stephen Christian announced their new album is finally done. On June 11, during the Nashville show of their acoustic tour, Stephen Christian announced that the title of the new record would be Vital, calling the record "their most aggressive to date" and also announced a fall release date. On July 31, the band announced on their official website that Vital was to be released on October 16.

The new album's opening track, "Self-Starter",' was streamed on Billboard.com for free listening on August 17., and the album's second single, "Someone Anyone" was released on August 22.

Infectious Magazine reported on October 26, 2012, that the band had already "made a lot of headway writing for the next record".

The band released "City Electric" on September 20, 2013. It is the first of three new and previously unreleased tracks from their rework of Vital, Devotion which was released on October 15, 2013.

=== Return to Tooth & Nail, Lowborn and breakup (2014) ===
On the January 16, 2014, the band posted a video in which the band confirmed that this year would be their last and that they would release their seventh, and seemingly final, studio album in mid-2014 on their original label, Tooth & Nail Records. They also stated that they would do their last set of tours following the release to celebrate what the band had become. On May 6, 2014, Anberlin revealed the title of the album, Lowborn, as well as the album artwork. The band played their final show on November 26, 2014, at the House of Blues in Orlando, Florida.

On December 15, 2017, it was announced that the band's former rhythm guitarist Nathan Strayer had died. He was 34.

=== Reunions, Equal Vision signing and Vega (2018–2022) ===
On October 18, 2018, the band announced that they would reunite for one show on December 14 at the Yuengling Center in Tampa, Florida, as part of Underoath's Erase Me Tour. They subsequently announced their first comeback show would be the 13th, a "secret show" at The Orpheum in Tampa. The band implied at these shows that they were coming back full time, as reflected in their social media saying they've been back from 2018 to present. In March 2019, it was announced that the band would perform a series of headlining shows across Australia in May 2019. This expanded to an announcement of a 22-stop U.S. tour the following month. Young stated the band had no plans for a full comeback after the reunion shows. However, Christian revealed in May 2020 that they had reversed course and were in the process of recording new music.

On September 2, 2021, the band released their first new song in over seven years, "Two Graves" on their Youtube channel, and began touring two days later to promote the song.

Anberlin released an EP, Silverline, on July 29, 2022, via Equal Vision Records, with whom they signed earlier in the month. Mixed by Jeremy SH Griffith and Mastered by Jonathan Berlin at The Loft Studio LA.

=== Stephen Christian's hiatus and departure, arrival of Matty Mullins and Currency (2023–present) ===
On June 9, 2023, Anberlin released a single entitled “Lacerate” via Equal Vision Records. It was the first single to feature guitarist Christian McAlhaney on lead vocals and the first from the EP Convinced, which was released on June 30, 2023.

On October 10, 2023, lead singer Stephen Christian announced an indefinite hiatus from the band in a touring capacity. Memphis May Fire singer Matty Mullins was subsequently named as Anberlin's new live lead vocalist. On June 14, 2024, the band announced their album Vega, which combined their 2022 and 2023 EPs Silverline and Convinced, as well as featuring two songs with Mullins on lead vocals, "Walk Alone" and "Seven". The former released on June 21 with a music video in which the band satirically auditioned new lead vocalists – including an incognito Christian. One day before the album's release, the band released the music video for "Seven". Vega was released on August 2, 2024. On March 21, 2025, the band released Nevertake – a re-recorded version of Never Take Friendship Personal with Mullins on lead vocals, commemorating the album's 20th anniversary. The band toured extensively in support of the anniversary of Never Take Friendship Personal, including a performance at that year's Furnace Fest with Christian joining the band.

The band toured in the spring of 2026 with Emery and Watashi Wa as support. On August 18, 2026, Anberlin announced their ninth studio album Currency, their first with Mullins as lead vocalist, supported by the lead single "Neverafter". With this announcement it was confirmed that Christian had fully departed the band, and Mullins would assume the full-time role as the band's lead vocalist.

== Origin of name ==
Anberlin lead vocalist Stephen Christian has stated different origins of the band's name in various interviews, prevalent among which was his claim that he had long intended to name his first daughter Anberlin. Struggling to find a name for the band, Stephen suggested it; "We were all sitting around trying to come up with a name. None of us were married or had kids, but one day I was going to name my daughter Anberlin, so I figured we could name the band that until we thought of something better. So we chose Anberlin and no one has thought of anything better." He stated he was no longer going to use Anberlin to name his first daughter, however he said, "If I ever have a daughter and name her Anberlin, she'll think she was named after the band instead of the other way around." Christian had also stated in another interview that the band's name was created when he was thinking about cities in Europe he wanted to visit. In his mind he listed "London, Paris, Rome, and Berlin." Christian thought that "and Berlin" would be an appropriate name for a band, and so when the band was looking for a name Christian suggested "And Berlin," which was then modified to "Anberlin."

Christian has since retracted those comments admitting that when the band first started, in interviews they "would take turn making stories about how it came to be" as a joke, as he believed the actual origin of the band name wasn't interesting enough. Christian said there was a story about how his grandfather had "saved a little girl from a World War II bombing... her name was Anberlin" and that they had hit a dog, which had the name Anberlin, with the stories getting more diverse, it was decided they reveal the true origin. He has said the "real" name came from the Radiohead song "Everything in Its Right Place", stating that "There are several stories that have circulated on the internet, but the actual story is when I was in college my favorite band was Radiohead; on one of their songs off the record Kid A there is a background noise on the song "Everything in Its Right Place" (about 2 minutes 31 seconds into the song). While Thom (Yorke) is singing try to say I always thought the background noise sounded like Anberlin, I always thought that Anberlin would have been a great band name and well...it was/is."

== Musical style ==
AllMusic described Anberlin as alternative rock, alternative pop and pop rock with elements of emo. Kerrang! also categorized them as emo, as well as a "MySpace band".

== Christianity ==
Over the years, many fans, critics, and other members of the media have consistently characterized Anberlin as a Christian band. However, Stephen Christian stated in an interview that their faith is more complicated than a simple label: "I think we're categorized like that a lot because we're on Tooth & Nail Records, which, years ago, was known as a Christian label and never lost that reputation. I don't care who listens to our records. If it helps people in whatever circumstances they're in, that's amazing, but I definitely don't classify us as a Christian band." Elsewhere, Christian has remarked, "[My faith] affects every single aspect of my life, but I'm not a preacher, I'm an entertainer."

Despite these statements and others of the like, multiple sources list the band as part of the Christian rock genre, and some Anberlin song lyrics do contain Christian references. Furthermore, the band appears at Christian music festivals such as Parachute Music Festival and Cornerstone Festival, and their songs have been included on Christian rock compilation CDs and DVDs. They are also played on the Gospel Music Channel.

Anberlin has also been repeatedly featured in Christian rock magazine HM (Hard Music, which was originally the fanzine Heaven's Metal). Christian submitted a letter to the magazine, criticizing the more overtly religious Christian punk band the Knights of the New Crusade for a promotional image that represented a "black mark on the face of Christianity".

Christian has also said in an interview with Lightforce radio how the band tries to "step out of the bubble" and referred to themselves as being part of Christian music. He discussed in detail what Christians should do in their lives: love and embrace others as Jesus would as well as show God's grace to others. He mentioned as well how the band Fall Out Boy said in an interview that they did not really know much about Jesus until Anberlin toured with them.

In an interview with Smartpunk, drummer Nathan Young commented, "The thing is, some bands that are trying to get out of the Christian market, they get bummed out by questions about it. I don’t really mind it, because I’m a Christian, and I’m okay talking about it. With the whole term 'Christian Band,' I don’t understand how a band can be Christian. We get the question, 'Is Anberlin a Christian band?' and it’s like, yeah, Anberlin is — as humans".

== Band members ==
Current members

- Joseph Milligan – lead guitar, backing vocals (2002–2014, 2018–present), keyboards (2007)
- Deon Rexroat – bass guitar (2002–2014, 2018–present)
- Nathan Young – drums, percussion (2002–2014, 2018–present)
- Christian McAlhaney – rhythm guitar, backing vocals (2007–2014, 2018–present)
- Matty Mullins — lead vocals (2023–2026) (touring member) (2026-present) (full time member)

Former members

- Stephen Christian – lead vocals (2002–2014, 2018–2026; absent from touring 2023–2026), keyboards (2002–2014)
- Joey Bruce – rhythm guitar (2002–2004)
- Nathan Strayer – rhythm guitar, backing vocals (2004–2007; died 2017)

Former touring musicians

- Jimmy Aceino – rhythm guitar (2004)
- Randy Torres – rhythm guitar, keyboards, percussion, backing vocals (2010)
- Kyle Flynn – keyboards, rhythm guitar, backing vocals (2009–2011)

Timeline

== Discography ==
- Blueprints for the Black Market (2003)
- Never Take Friendship Personal (2005)
- Cities (2007)
- New Surrender (2008)
- Dark Is the Way, Light Is a Place (2010)
- Vital (2012)
- Lowborn (2014)
- Vega (2024)
- Currency (2026)

== Side projects ==
=== Anchor & Braille ===
Stephen Christian formed an acoustic side project, Anchor & Braille. The project was originally a joint venture with Aaron Marsh of the band Copeland; however, Marsh only featured on the project's debut album, entitled Felt, which he also produced. The project first yielded a 7" vinyl, and Felt was released on August 4, 2009. On July 31, 2012, Anchor & Braille's second album, The Quiet Life, was released. Later, in 2016, after the break-up of Anberlin, Anchor & Braille's third studio album, Songs for the Late Night Drive Home, was released.

=== Carrollhood ===
Nathan Young formed a side project with his brother-in-law Tim McTague of Underoath and Reed Murray in July 2011. Carrollhood released their first three-song EP, Afraid, on August 23, 2012. The EP included "Afraid", "Remission" and "Mr. Tampa". The second three-song EP, Violence, was released February 11, 2013. It included "Two Minutes Hate", "Violence", "MDSFWL".

=== Sins ===
Joseph Milligan formed a side project, "Sins", who released Sink Away on December 19, 2012.

=== Loose Talk ===
Deon Rexroat and Christian McAlhaney started a band called Loose Talk. Former drummer Nathan Young provided the drums for the band's first EP.
