= Blueprints for the Black Market =

Studio album by Anberlin
- Released: May 6, 2003
- Studios: The New Compound Studios, Seattle, Washington
- Genres: Alternative rock; emo
- Length: 37:51
- Label: Tooth & Nail
- Producer: Aaron Sprinkle

Anberlin chronology
Blueprints for the Black Market (2003)	Never Take Friendship Personal (2005)

Singles from Blueprints for the Black Market
- 1. "Readyfuels" Released: 2003; 2. "Change the World (Lost Ones)" Released: 2003

Blueprints for the Black Market is the debut studio album by the band Anberlin. It was released on May 6, 2003, barely a year after the band formed, and was the only album that was released with guitarist Joey Bruce in the band line-up. Blueprints had two singles, "Readyfuels", for which a music video was filmed and "Change the World (Lost Ones)". Although the album has sold over 60,000 units, its success pales compared to Anberlin's later albums, failing to chart on the Billboard 200.

== Critical reception ==
Professional ratings
Review scores
Source	Rating
Allmusic	2/5 stars
CCM Magazine	B−
Christianity Today	3/5 stars
Cross Rhythms	10/10 squares
Jesus Freak Hideout	4.5/5 stars
Melodic	3/5 stars
The Phantom Tollbooth	4/5 stars

Blueprints for the Black Market garnered generally positive reception from Music critics. At CCM Magazine, Brian Quincy Newcomb graded the album a B−, stating how the release "rocks assuredly, benefiting from the dynamic production of Aaron Sprinkle". Johnny Loftus rated it two stars, writing how the album "lack[s] any definition" and this makes the release "an utterly pleasant bore." At Christianity Today, Russ Breimeier rated it three stars, saying that the album "sounds absolutely terrific." Tony Cummings of Cross Rhythms rated it a perfect ten squares, calling this "something special" that will be "A must for every rock buff." At Jesus Freak Hideout, Matt Gray rated it four-and-a-half stars, proclaiming this to be a "glorious debut". Bert Gangl of The Phantom Tollbooth rated it four stars, noting that the band "succeeds magnificently [...] crafting a work of sweeping, melodic, emotional, hook-laden beauty." At Melodic, Pär Winberg rated the album three stars, remarking that it is an "Impressive debut."

== Track listing ==
- All songs written and composed by Anberlin except where noted.
1. "Readyfuels" – 3:37
2. "Foreign Language" – 2:49
3. "Change the World (Lost Ones)" – 3:59
4. "Cold War Transmissions" – 3:12
5. "Glass to the Arson" – 3:29
6. "The Undeveloped Story" – 3:27
7. "Autobahn" – 3:25
8. "We Dreamt in Heist" – 3:17
9. "Love Song" (The Cure cover; composed by Simon Gallup, Roger O'Donnell, Robert Smith, Porl Thompson, and Boris Williams with lyrics by Smith) – 3:05
10. "Cadence" – 3:17
11. "Naïve Orleans" – 4:08

== Personnel ==
Anberlin

- Stephen Christian – lead vocals, keyboards
- Joseph Milligan – lead guitar, vocals
- Joey Bruce – rhythm guitar
- Deon Rexroat – bass guitar
- Nathan Young – drums, percussion

Production

- Aaron Sprinkle – production, engineering, mixing
- J. R. McNeely – mixing
- Troy Glessner – mastering
- Michael Christian McCaddon – art direction, photography, design
- David Johnson – band photography
- Brandon Ebel – executive producer
