= Never Take Friendship Personal =

Studio album by Anberlin
- Released: February 1, 2005
- Recorded: 2004
- Studios: The Compound, Seattle, Washington
- Genres: Alternative rock; art rock; pop punk; emo
- Length: 39:29
- Label: Tooth & Nail
- Producer: Aaron Sprinkle

Anberlin chronology
Blueprints for the Black Market (2003)	Never Take Friendship Personal (2005)	Godspeed EP (2006)

Singles from Never Take Friendship Personal
- 1. "A Day Late" Released: 2005; 2. "Paperthin Hymn" Released: January 10, 2006

Never Take Friendship Personal is the second studio album by alternative rock band Anberlin, released on February 1, 2005 on Tooth & Nail Records. Its singles were "A Day Late" and "Paperthin Hymn" and music videos have been made of each. "(The Symphony of) Blasé" is sometimes referred to as "Amsterdam". The album's name is inspired by when the band chose to remove guitarist Joey Bruce.

The song "Dance, Dance Christa Päffgen" was inspired by multi-talented artist Nico, whose given name was Christa Päffgen. The song references her struggle with drugs and unrelated death.

The album was re-released and re-recorded with Matty Mullins on vocals and called ‘Nevertake’ released on March 20, 2025.

== Critical reception ==
Professional ratings
Review scores
Source	Rating
AbsolutePunk	88%
Allmusic	4/5 stars
CCM Magazine	B−
Christianity Today	4/5 stars
Cross Rhythms	8/10 squares
Jesus Freak Hideout	4/5 stars
Melodic	4/5 stars
Punknews.org	4/5 stars

Never Take Friendship Personal garnered positive reception from Music critics. Johan Wippsson of Melodic rated the album four stars, remarking how this "is a fantastic album and a great follow up, even better than their great debut." At Christianity Today, Andy Argyrakis rated the album four stars, highlighting how the album is "for those seeking an artfully made and engagingly played project, just not ideal for those looking for faith based edification" on which the music has "sophisticated alternative sonics, ample hooks and sweeping melodies." Rick Anderson of Allmusic rated the album four stars, affirming that it is "Very highly recommended overall." At Cross Rhythms, Tony Cummings rated the album eight squares out of ten, proclaiming that "Seldom has art rock worn such an accessible sheen." Scott Weber of AbsolutePunk rated the album an eighty-eight-percent, stating that the band has the "ability to construct such beautiful songs with euphoric vocals." At Jesus Freak Hideout, John DiBiase rated the album four stars, calling it a "solid sophomore effort from these experts of catchy, hooky alternative rock." Punknews.org's Anchors rated the album four stars, noting the album as "one hell of a guilty pleasure." At CCM Magazine, Louis R. Carlozo graded the album a B−, cautioning that "while its individual songs (and sing-along hooks) often satisfy, fails to transcend a formulaic plateau."

== Track listing ==
All tracks are written by Stephen Christian and Joseph Milligan.

No.	Title	Length
1.	"Never Take Friendship Personal" (featuring Ryan Clark of Demon Hunter)	3:31
2.	"Paperthin Hymn"	3:15
3.	"Stationary Stationery" (featuring Seth Roberts of Watashi Wa and Lakes)	2:58
4.	"(The Symphony of) Blasé"	4:21
5.	"A Day Late"	3:34
6.	"The Runaways" (featuring Phil Sneed of Greek Fire and Story of the Year)	3:21
7.	"Time & Confusion"	3:23
8.	"The Feel Good Drag"	3:25
9.	"Audrey, Start the Revolution!"	3:23
10.	"A Heavy Hearted Work of Staggering Genius"	1:12
11.	"Dance, Dance Christa Päffgen" (featuring Mike Weiss of mewithoutYou)	7:06

Note: In August 2011 while doing a Q&A on AbsolutePunk.net, Stephen Christian spoke of "New Fast Automatic", a demo song that was recorded during the Never Take Friendship Personal sessions saying, "A while back I posted lyrics to an old blog of mine. On there were lyrics to a song called 'New Fast Automatic'. After Anberlin's Twitter account got blown up with how to get that song we figured we should try and dig it up! And Joey was amazing and mixed it all up." The download link was posted in the Q&A as well as on Christian's Twitter account. The song has never been officially released.

== Personnel ==
Anberlin

- Stephen Christian – lead vocals, keyboards
- Joseph Milligan – lead guitar
- Nathan Strayer – rhythm guitar, vocals
- Deon Rexroat – bass guitar
- Nathan Young – drums, percussion

Production

- Aaron Sprinkle – producer, engineer
- JR McNeely – mixing
- Troy Glessner – mastering
- Brandon Ebel – executive producer

Additional musicians

- Phil Sneed – additional vocals ("The Runaways")
- Seth Roberts – additional vocals ("Stationary Stationery")
- Ryan Clark – unclean vocals ("Never Take Friendship Personal")
- Mike Weiss – guitars ("Dance, Dance, Christa Päffgen")

Artwork

- Jeff Gros – photography
- John Deeb – band photography
- Asterik Studio – art direction & design
- Kris McCaddon – Anberlin logo

Management

- Kyle Griner – Management for Arson Media Group, Inc
- Melody King – Booking Agent for The Agency Group, Ltd
- Chad Johnson – A&R
- Mike McKoy – Legal for Serling Rooks & Ferrara, LLP
