= Cartel discography =

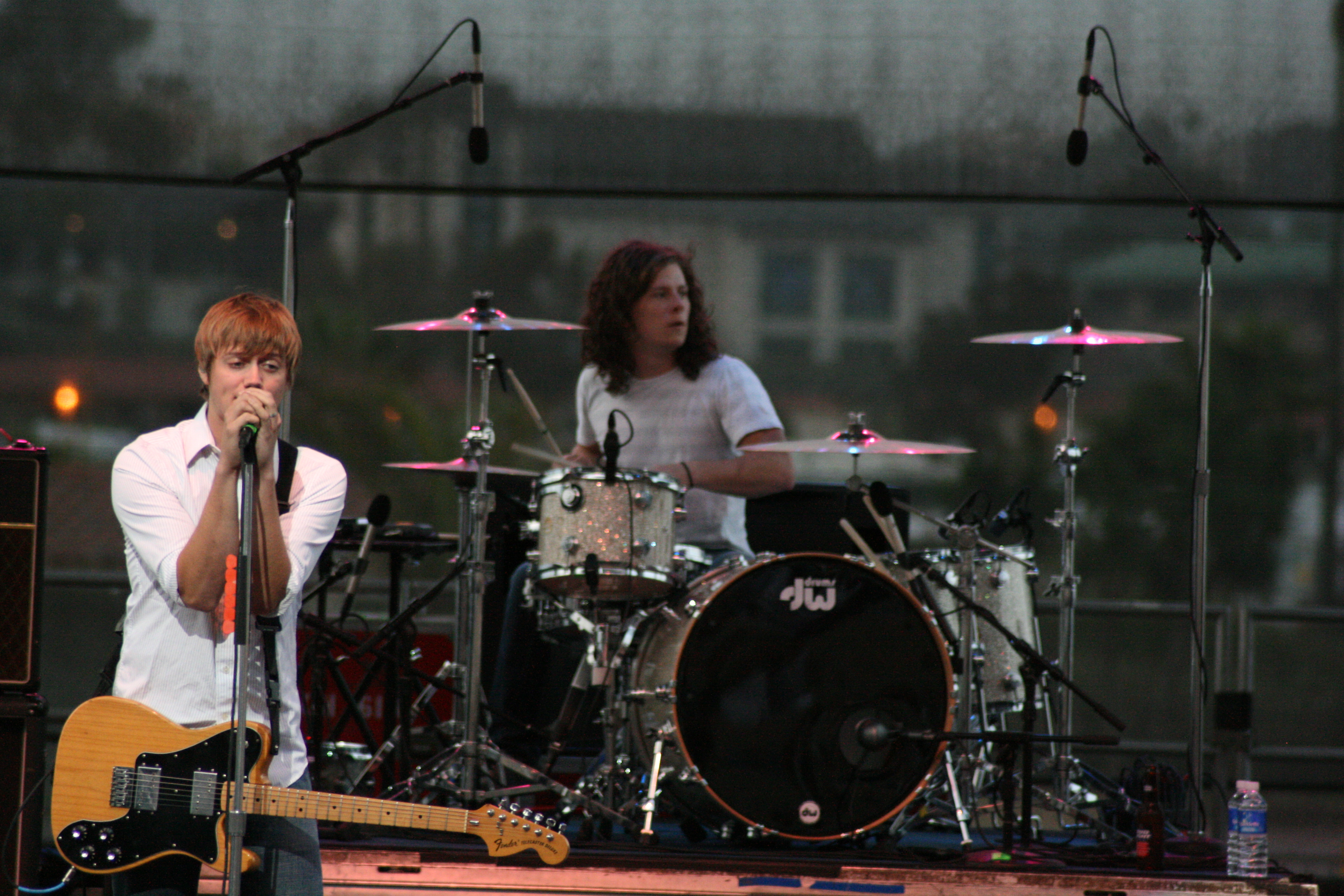
- Cartel performing live in Del Mar, California.
- Studio albums: 4
- Extended plays: 4
- Singles: 8
- Music videos: 7

This article presents the discography of all albums and singles released by the American pop rock group Cartel. It includes five studio albums, four extended plays, nine singles and ten music videos.

Cartel released their debut album Chroma via the Militia Group on September 20, 2005. The album didn't do too well on the Billboard 200, only reaching number 140. It charted higher on the US Indie Chart at number 38 and peaked at number 2 on the Top Heatseekers Chart. Their first single,"Honestly", peaked at number 89 on the Billboard Hot 100 and the song went on to reach number 26 on the Billboard Mainstream Top 40. Their second single, "Say Anything (Else)", failed to make the Hot 100.

The band's second album, the self-titled Cartel, was released August 21, 2007 on their new label Epic Records. Cartel recorded their album in 20 days as part of the MTV show Band in a Bubble. The exposure from the MTV show helped the album. It charted at number 20 on the Billboard 200, becoming the group's highest chart performance to date. On the Billboard Top Rock albums it reached number 5. The first single taken from Cartel was called "Lose It", however it did not chart as expected. The second single "No Subject (Come with Me)", did poorly as did the third single "The Fortunate". Epic records dropped Cartel soon after.

Cartel's third album, Cycles, was released in October 2009 via Wind-up Records. Cycles managed to chart at number 59 on the Billboard 200. The album also reached number 25 on the Billboard's Top Rock albums. "Let's Go" was the lead-off single released in July 2009. It didn't make the charts. The second single "The Perfect Mistake" was released in September and charted at number 39 on Pop Songs. The album's third single "Faster Ride" was released in August 2010.

The band's fourth studio album is titled Collider. The album was released independently by the group on March 26, 2013. It charted at number 141 on the Billboard 200 chart, reached number 40 on the Top Rock albums, and number 28 on the US Indie chart.

Cartel released their fifth album, their first in 13 years, Learning How to Cope on September 18, 2026 via Field Day Records.

== Albums ==
=== Studio albums ===
Year	Album details	Peak chart positions			
Year	Album details	US	US Rock	US Indie	US Heat
2005	Chroma: Release date: September 20, 2005; Label: The Militia Group; Format: CD, DL, LP	140	—	38	2
2007	Cartel: Release date: August 21, 2007; Label: Epic Records; Format: CD, DL, LP	20	5	—	—
2009	Cycles: Release date: October 20, 2009; Label: Wind-up Records; Format: CD, DL	59	25	—	—
2013	Collider: Release date: March 26, 2013; Label: Self-released; Format: CD, DL, LP	141	40	28	—
2026	Learning How to Cope: Release date: September 18, 2026; Label: Field Day Records; Format: CD, DL, LP	—	—	—	—
"—" denotes releases that did not chart

=== Extended plays ===
Year	Album details	Peak chart positions			
Year	Album details	US	US Rock	US Indie	US Heat
2004	The Ransom EP: Release date: November 16, 2004; Label: The Militia Group	—	—	—	—
2006	Live Dudes: Release date: June 13, 2006; Label: Epic Records	—	—	—	—
2006	Warped Tour Session: Release date: 2006; Label: Epic Records	—	—	—	—
2011	In Stereo: Release date: October 4, 2011; Label: Self-released	—	—	—	—
"—" denotes releases that did not chart

== Singles ==
Year	Single	Peak chart positions		Album	Certifications
Year	Single	US	US Pop	Album	Certifications
2006	"Honestly"	89	26	Chroma	RIAA: Gold
2006	"Say Anything (Else)"	—	—	Chroma	
2007	"Lose It"	—	—	Cartel	
2007	"No Subject (Come with Me)"	—	—	Cartel	
2007	"The Fortunate"	—	—	Cartel	
2009	"Let's Go"	—	—	Cycles	
2010	"The Perfect Mistake"	—	39	Cycles	
2010	"Faster Ride"	—	—	Cycles	
2013	"Uninspired"	—	—	Collider	
"—" denotes releases that did not chart

== Album appearances ==
Year	Song	Album
2006	"Wonderwall" (Oasis cover)	Punk Goes '90s
2008	"Rockin' Around the Christmas Tree"	Kevin & Bean's Super Christmas

== Music videos ==
Year	Song	Director
2006	"Honestly"	David Ahuja
2006	"Say Anything (Else)"	David Ahuja
2007	"Lose It"	
2007	"No Subject (Come with Me)"	
2009	"The Fortunate"	
2009	"Let's Go"	Paul Boyd
2010	"The Perfect Mistake"	
2026	"Oxy Moron"	Benjamin Lieber
2026	"Give or Take"	Benjamin Lieber
2026	"Deadbeat Drag"	Benjamin Lieber
