= Act As If =

American indie rock quintet

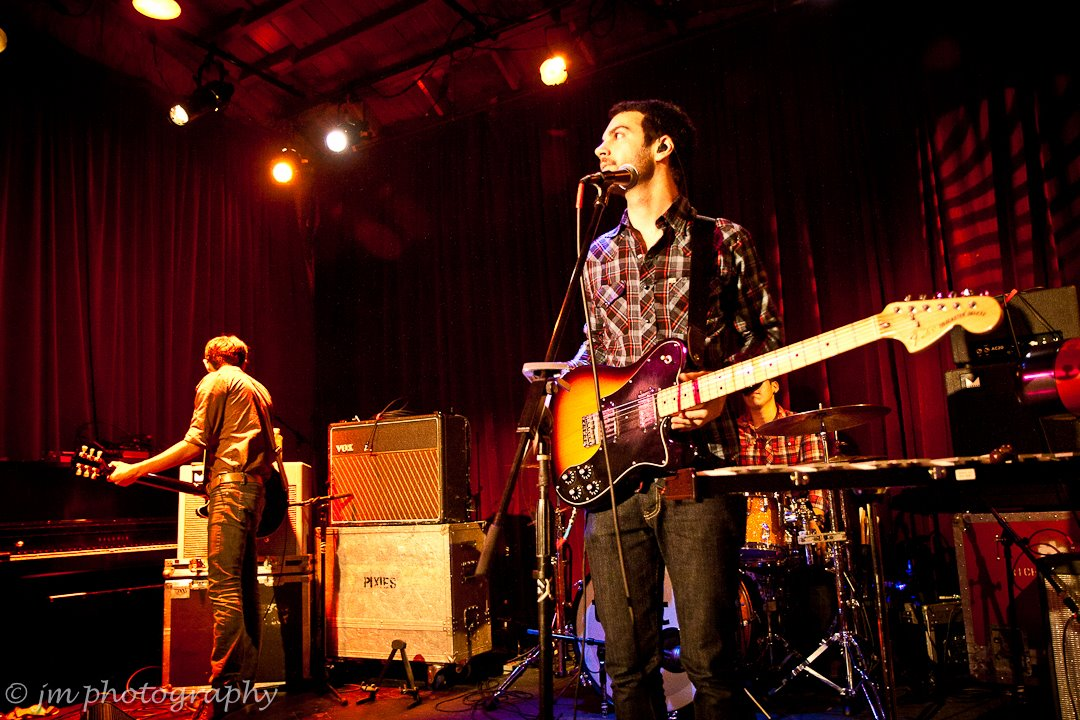
- Act As If in 2011

Background information
- Origin: Los Angeles, United States
- Genres: Indie rock, Indie pop
- Years active: 2010–present
- Label: Unsigned
- Members: Peter Verdell; Diego De La Rosa; Sara Lindsay; Tristen Whaley; Derrick Wong
- Website: www.actasifmusic.com

Act As If is an American indie rock quintet from Los Angeles, United States, led by singer/songwriter Peter Verdell.

== History ==
After quitting his job in A&R at Drive-Thru Records in 2008, lead singer Peter Verdell began working on his own first full length record, There's A Light, which was released on iTunes in May 2010. Mixed by Nick Baumhardt (Thousand Foot Krutch, The Class of 98), and mastered by Troy Glessner (Death Cab for Cutie, Pedro the Lion), the record was written and produced by Verdell, who also performed all instruments on the record, including: drums, guitars, piano, synths and vocals. Shortly after the release of "There's A Light" an official full band lineup was formed and the band began playing shows around LA including venues such as: The Troubadour, West Hollywood, Spaceland, House of Blues, The Bootleg, Hotel Café, Roxy Theatre (West Hollywood), The Glasshouse, The Viper Room, and Silverlake Lounge.

In an interview with Anti Music, Verdell discusses the meaning behind the music: "I think the general message (and maybe the general theme of our album), is that when things seem to be falling apart, or someone we love doesn't love us back—we can still find light, or joy, or hope—if we choose to look for it."

There's A Light was deemed Fuseworthy by Fuse TV, and Absolutepunk.net has featured tracks from the album on their site.

Songs from There's A Light have been featured on Apple.com [Lion OS X Promo video], ABC's Cougar Town, CBS's Live to Dance, and episodes of MTV's The Buried Life, and Jersey Shore.

In September 2011, Act As If released a video for their cover of Blink-182's song "'Pathetic", off the band's 1997 album, Dude Ranch. This video soon caught the attention of Blink-182's bassist/singer Mark Hoppus, who posted it on his personal Facebook page.

In December 2011, the band released a Christmas single, "Sleighbells & Reindeer," featuring Lucy Schwartz and Brian Fennell of Barcelona. The song was featured on ABC Family's 25 Days of Christmas countdown and offered as a free download when fans pre-ordered Act As If's new EP "The Iron Is Hot," which came out on February 21, 2012. Since release "The Iron Is Hot" has gained attention from blogs such as Kick Kick Snare, and Kings of A&R, and the second song on the EP, "Oh My My", received extensive airplay on The World Famous KROQ-FM's Locals Only show with DJ / taste-maker Kat Corbett. The music video for "Oh, My My" premiered on MTV.

Songs from "The Iron is Hot" have been featured on ABC's Pretty Little Liars, Nick TV's Degrassi: The Next Generation, MTV's The Real World.

Act As If released their album, Steady on November 10, 2014, and followed up with the EP Lovers Online on September 16, 2016.

== Performances ==
Act As If has played with artists including The Daylights, Barcelona, Emery, Everybody Else, and Stacy Clark.

== Discography ==
- There's A Light (2010)
- "The Iron Is Hot" EP (2012)
- Steady (2014)
- Lovers Online EP (2016)
