= Driving East =

- Origin: Fairfax, Virginia, U.S.
- Genres: Rock; Pop punk Powerpop
- Years active: 2002 –2007 2009–present
- Labels: Brand Name Records; The Militia Group
- Members: Barrett Mullins; Nate Taylor; Steve Zapp; Trevor Melton
- Past members: Aaron Hubbard; Jeff Streicher; Tim Ilardi; Christian Hernandez; Curtis Marion (2003-2005); Justin Horenstein; Dustin Largin (2002-2006); Jon Jester (2002-2009)
- Website: Driving East's profile at MySpace

Driving East is an American pop punk band from Fairfax, Virginia.

== History ==
Driving East formed in 2002 after numerous line-up changes. Jon Jester, the original drummer, had moved to Los Angeles to work with his friends in the South African band Just Jinger shortly after they signed with Capitol Records. However, the lure of playing drums brought him back to the East Coast and back to Driving East. Before leaving the West Coast, Jester recruited Aaron Hubbard, who earned a Master's degree in music, to become the band's bassist, and New Jersey guitarist Dustin Largin.

The union of Jester, Aaron Hubbard, Nate Taylor, and Barrett Mullins made up Driving East at the height of their popularity in the mid-to-late 2000s. Producer Matt Squire, who worked with the band on A Black Eye or a Broken Heart, said of the band, "Many people try to write songs to get them on the radio but with Driving East what you’re hearing is what comes naturally to them."

Following the 2005 release of their debut EP, A Black Eye or a Broken Heart, on Brand Name Records and performances with national headliners such as Maroon 5, Acceptance, Fall Out Boy and Cartel, as well as two years on the East Coast legs of the Warped Tour, the then-five-piece was signed by The Militia Group, who released their self-titled digital EP in late 2006. The EP was recorded prior to their signing by the production team of Kenneth Mount and Zach Odom. The band was on the East Coast legs of 2005 and 2006 Warped Tour.

In 2007, Driving East has continued to tour in support of their EP, which Steve Henderson of AbsolutePunk.net commended for its "unparalleled, monstrous hooks." In the summer of 2007, the band returned to the studio to record a new album, The Future of the Free World is Riding on This One, their long-awaited full-length debut album which was released digitally on January 15, 2008. Tony Pascarella of AbsolutePunk.net has called it "an insanely poppy, catchy album" that "evokes the raw fiery passion of Cartel's The Ransom EP." The band was also recently listed as one of the "Next Big Thing(s) of 2008" by the website's founder and CEO, Jason Tate.

In early 2009, drummer Jon Jester joined notable D.C. pop rock group The Dance Party and recorded the band's debut record for HellYa! Records/Atlantic Records in Los Angeles, California. Trevor Melton became the new drummer for the band c. 2010. The band has not released an album since 2008.

As of December 2017 the band choose not to continue to renew their music via online streaming sites.

== Members ==
- Barrett Mullins – vocals
- Nate Taylor – guitar, backing vocals
- Dustin Largin – guitar
- Steve Zapp – bass
- Trevor Melton – drums

== Discography ==
=== EPs ===
- A Black Eye or a Broken Heart (2005)
- Driving East (2006)

=== Albums ===
- The Future of the Free World is Riding on This One (2008)

=== Non-album tracks ===
- "Family Reunion/Online Songs" (blink-182 cover) – released on A Tribute to Blink 182: Pacific Ridge Records Heroes of Pop Punk, Vol. 2 (2005)
