= LFW =

LFW may refer to:

- Lomé–Tokoin International Airport (IATA code)
- London Fashion Week
- Lakme Fashion Week
- Leo Fortune-West, (born 1971), English footballer
- Laser Focus World, a magazine
- Linear friction welding
- LFW, a High Feature engine manufactured by General Motors
- Lost for Words (disambiguation), several meanings
