= Phantoms (Acceptance album) =

Studio album by Acceptance
- Released: April 26, 2005
- Recorded: June–July 2004
- Studio: Compound Studios, Seattle, Washington
- Genre: Pop-punk; emo; alternative rock; pop rock
- Length: 37:35
- Label: Columbia
- Producer: Aaron Sprinkle

Acceptance chronology
Black Lines to Battlefields (2003)	Phantoms (2005)	Colliding by Design (2017)

Singles from Phantoms
- 1. "Different" Released: March 1, 2005; 2. "Take Cover" Released: September 13, 2005

Phantoms is the debut studio album by American rock band Acceptance, released on April 26, 2005, by Columbia. It has gained notoriety as being one of the albums released by Sony BMG in the mid-2000s containing their controversial Extended Copy Protection software package, that resulted in lawsuits and settlements to consumers.

== Background ==
Acceptance formed in Seattle, Washington, in 1998, with a line-up of: vocalist/bassit Jason Vena, guitarist Kaylan Cloyd, guitarist Chris DeCastro and drummer Peter Pizzuto. The group released a self-produced EP, titled Lost for Words, in late 2000 through independent label Rocketstar Records. Sometime after this, Pizzuto and DeCastro departed from the group; the pair were replaced by Garrett Lunceford and Christian McAlhaney, respectively. Ryan Zwiefelhofer then joined on bass. The group then recorded another EP, this time with Aaron Sprinkle. This brought the band to the attention of Columbia Records president Rick Rubin and A&R representative Matt Pinfield. The band wished to release it through an independent label in order to build a fan base and tour for a period of time, before creating an album for Columbia. Columbia thought this was a good idea, and as a result, the Black Lines to Battlefields EP was released in 2003 through The Militia Group. Shortly afterwards, Lunceford left the group.

== Composition and recording ==
The album's sound has been described as alternative pop, pop, pop rock, rock, and emo. All of the songs on the album were written, but were left unfinished before recording. Prior to entering the studio, the group did pre-production for a few months. By the time they entered the studio, the band had complete songs. Phantoms was recorded at The Compound in Capitol Hill, Seattle with Sprinkle handling production duties.

== Release ==
In August and September 2004, the band toured with Gatsbys American Dream and the Snake the Cross the Crown. They went on a West Coast tour in February 2005 with Killradio and Over It. On February 24, 2005, Phantoms was announced for release, and the album's track listing was revealed. On March 1, 2005, "Different" was released as a single. In March and April, the band went on tour with Copeland, Lovedrug, As Tall as Lions and Eager Seas. It was promoted with an appearance at The Bamboozle and Flipside festivals, and a May 2005 tour with Vendetta Red, Head Automatica and A Static Lullaby. The band then supported Anberlin and Saosin on their tour of the US in June and July. Following this, the band joined Cartel, the Receiving End of Sirens and Panic! at the Disco on the Take Cover tour. "Take Cover" was released to radio on September 13. The band supported Yellowcard on their club tour of the US between October and December 2005.

On January 31, 2006, it was announced that bassist Ryan Zwiefelhofer had left the band, citing that he needed to "find the place that defines who I am." The group's touring keyboardist Kyle Flynn filled in on bass duties. In February and March, the group went on the Truckstops and Statelines tour, alongside The Academy Is..., Panic! at the Disco, and Hellogoodbye. On August 2, the band announced they were breaking up. With the exception of Vena, the members formed new bands.

== Reception ==
Professional ratings
Review scores
Source	Rating
AllMusic (initial review)	2/5 stars
AllMusic (update after March 2016)	3.5/5 stars
AbsolutePunk	93%
Jesus Freak Hideout	4/5 stars
Melodic	3.5/5 stars
Punknews.org	2/5 stars

Phantoms was met with limited critical acclaim. AbsolutePunk wrote: "It's not often that bands can create pop-oriented music that has lasting value, but Acceptance has managed to do it with Phantoms. Outstanding vocals and truly talented songwriting sets this band apart from everybody else."

In 2016, Johnny Loftus from AllMusic revisited Phantoms and doubled his initial review score from two out of five stars to four out of five stars, saying that "Phantoms is slick and melodic, drawing its tension from the careful multi-tracking of Jason Vena's vocals and layers of guitars," but leaving the review textually unchanged.

By March 2006, the album had sold over 75,000 copies. In the years following its release, Phantoms became a cult classic. As of February 2017, Phantoms had sold 112,000 copies in the United States.

== Track listing ==
1. "Take Cover" – 2:46
2. "So Contagious" – 3:04
3. "In Too Far" – 2:54
4. "The Letter" – 3:02
5. "Different" – 4:07
6. "Ad Astra Per Aspera" – 1:19
7. "This Conversation Is Over" – 3:15
8. "Over You" – 3:52
9. "Breathless" – 2:42
10. "In the Cold" – 3:36
11. "Permanent" – 3:22
12. "Glory/Us" – 3:06

== Personnel ==
Acceptance

- Jason Vena – lead vocals, piano, keyboards
- Christian McAlhaney – rhythm guitar, backing vocals
- Kaylan Cloud – lead guitar
- Ryan Zwiefelhofer – bass guitar
- Nick Radovanovic – drums

Additional musicians

- Aaron Sprinkle – additional guitars and percussion, backing vocals on "Breathless"
- Zach Hodges – Rhodes piano on "Glory/Us"
- Phil Peterson – cello on "Different"

Production

- Aaron Sprinkle – programming, producer, engineer
- J.R. McNeely – mixing engineer
- Jack Joseph Puig – mixing engineer on "Different"
- Chris Lord-Alge – mixing engineer on "Permanent"
- Brian "Big Bass" Gardner – mastering engineer
