= Photographs (EP) =

EP by Lakes
- Released: September 5, 2006
- Recorded: Sound Management in San Jose, CA and Lynsong Studio Atascadero, CA
- Genre: Indie rock
- Length: 20:42
- Label: The Militia Group
- Producer: Seth Roberts, Jason Massey

Photographs is the debut release of Lakes, lead singer and guitarist Seth Roberts' newest ensemble after his first group Watashi Wa disbanded in 2004. Itas first performed at the Cornerstone festival in 2006, where L the bandlso sold a limited number (200 copies) of the EP. The first public release was on August 3, 2006 in a digital format, as an Absolute Punk exclusive. The band and label maintain the physical release date of September 5, 2006 as the official release date.

== Reception ==
Professional ratings
Review scores
Source	Rating
Absolute Punk	(88%)
Allmusic	3.5/5 stars

Photographs garnered warm reviews from most critics, typically citing Robert's strong voice as a highlight of the album.

== Track listing ==
All tracks are written by Seth Roberts.

No.	Title	Length
1.	"Indian Lover"	4:01
2.	"Love Or Gain"	4:41
3.	"Photographs"	3:37
4.	"Latersss"	4:26
5.	"White Flag"	4:01
Total length:		20:46

=== Notes ===
- Percussion on "Indian Lover" by Jeremy Limpic
- Vocals on "Photographs" by Aaron Marsh ( appears courtesy of Copeland /The Militia Group)
- Vocals on "White Flag" by Mike Herrera (appears courtesy of MXPX/Side One Dummy)
- Bass on "Photographs," Stand up Bass on "Indian Lover," and group vocals on "White Flag" by Roger Tompkins

== Personnel ==
- Seth Roberts – vocals, Guitar
- Jason Massey – vocals, Guitar, drums, Piano, Keyboards
- Jonathan Russo – Drums, Percussion
- Erik Brunner – Bass

== Production ==
- Producers: Seth Roberts and Jason Massey
- Engineers: Seth Roberts, Jason Massey, Jonathan Russo, Scott Silleta
- Mixing: Matt Malpass
- Mastering: Mike Fossenkemper
