= This Is Who You Are =

Studio album by The Beautiful Mistake
- Released: April 6, 2004
- Genre: Indie rock, alternative rock, emo
- Length: 37:19
- Label: Sore Point, The Militia Group

The Beautiful Mistake chronology
The Beautiful Mistake EP (2003)	This Is Who You Are (2004)	The Beautiful Mistake & Ettison Clio (2006)

Professional ratings
Review scores
Source	Rating
AllMusic	2.5/5 stars

This Is Who You Are is the second studio album by The Beautiful Mistake. The album was released on April 6, 2004.

This Is Who You Are peaked at #49 on the Billboard Top Heatseekers chart, and #22 on the Billboard Top Independent chart.

== Track listing ==
1. "This Is Who You Are" – 3:52
2. "Wide Eyed and Wasted" – 3:47
3. "My Reminder" – 3:50
4. "Cold Hearts (For Tired Souls)" – 3:12
5. "A Safe Place" – 2:52
6. "The Separation" – 3:24
7. "The Great Divorce" – 3:37
8. "Walking Wounded" – 2:36
9. "A Friendly Committee" – 2:07
10. "Cold Hands (For Dying Hearts)" – 8:02
