= Acceptance discography =

American alternative rock band

- Studio albums: 3
- EPs: 4
- Singles: 5

The discography of Acceptance, an American alternative rock band, consists of two studio albums, four extended plays, and five singles.

== Albums ==
=== Studio albums ===
List of studio albums, with selected chart positions and certifications
Title	Album details	Peak chart positions
Title	Album details	US
Phantoms	Released: April 26, 2005; Label: Columbia (8-2876-77731); Formats: CD, DL, LP	122
Colliding by Design	Released: February 24, 2017; Label: Rise; Formats: CD, DL, LP	134
Wild, Free	Released: October 9, 2020; Label: Tooth & Nail; Formats: CD, DL, LP	

=== Extended plays ===
List of extended plays
Title	Year
Lost for Words	2000
Black Lines to Battlefields	2003
Undone	2005
Sessions@AOL	2005
Wild	2020

== Singles ==
Title	Year	Chart Positions	Album
Title	Year	US Modern Rock	Album
"Permanent"	2003	—	Black Lines to Battlefields
"Different"	2005	25	Phantoms
"Take Cover"	2005	—	Phantoms
"Take You Away"	2015	—	Non-album single
"—" denotes a recording that did not chart or was not released in that territory.
