= Collider (Cartel album) =

Studio album by Cartel
- Released: March 26, 2013
- Recorded: August 2012 – January 2013
- Genres: Rock, pop rock
- Length: 39:48
- Label: Self-released
- Producers: Will Pugh, Joseph Pepper

Cartel chronology
In Stereo (2011)	Collider (2013)	Learning How to Cope (2026)

Singles from Collider
- 1. "Uninspired" Released: January 19, 2013

Collider is the fourth studio album by American rock band Cartel. In 2008 Cartel left Epic to sign with Wind-Up. Following this the group released Cycles (2009). Bassist Jeff Lett left to focus on school, and the band parted ways with Wind-Up. In October 2011 the group self-released In Stereo. The band called the idea of self-releasing music as "experiment[al]". Following a tour with Set Your Goals in March and April 2012 the group started writing new material. In August, the band started recording, and they finished in January 2013. The album was produced by vocalist Will Pugh and guitarist Joseph Pepper. After making a few songs available for streaming, the album was self-released on March 26, 2013. It charted at number 141 on the Billboard 200 chart. To support the album, the band toured the U.S. and the UK alongside New Found Glory, State Champs, Kids in Glass Houses and Mayday Parade.

This was the band's last album with drummer Kevin Sanders before he departed from the group in 2025.

== Background ==
In July 2008 Cartel left Epic and signed with Wind-Up. While on Wind-Up the group released Cycles (2009). In April 2011 it was announced that bassist Jeff Lett left the band to finish school. Nic Hudson initially took over Lett's position. Shortly afterwards, the group left Wind-Up. In August 2011 the band revealed that they had left Wind-Up. The band realized that they needed to release new music or else they "wouldn't be validating ourselves", according to vocalist Will Pugh. The band "experiment[ed]" with the concept of self-releasing their music; this resulted in the In Stereo EP, which was released in October. The recording process for which was not that different from their previous efforts, besides the fact Hudson was playing bass. The band saw the release of an EP as suitable due to the momentum of continuing without a record label. Pugh mentioned that they didn't have time to recording an album's worth of material. The group planned to have another EP out in March/April time. However, when the band realized they were going on tour, they decided to release a new song, "Disconnect", to help promote the tour.

== Composition and recording ==
When juxtaposed forces collide in the arena of physics many things can happen: destruction, creation, and metamorphosis [...] We feel [...] all of those things [...] shaped the career arc of this band. [...] They have had a direct impact on the way we create the music [...].

— Cartel, discussing the album's title, 2013

Cartel toured alongside Set Your Goals in March and April 2012. In a March 2012 interview, Pugh mentioned that the band were going to write new material after the tour was over. Pugh revealed that the band were at the beginning of the writing process. Pugh didn't want the material to be "a bunch of girl songs". From a lyrical point of view, Pugh stated that the lyrics would be written from a different perspective due to him being married. The album's title is a summary of events that shaped the band's career. Cartel viewed the album as a "culmination of 3 years worth of life, love, and reflection".

Cartel was hoping to record this new material after they had toured the UK and have it released "by the end of the summer". On August 12, the band announced they had finished pre-production and were going to start recording a new album on August 20. The band recorded at Kenneth Mount and Zack Odom's studio while the pair were away on vacation. Pugh took the role of producer with guitarist Joseph Pepper co-producing. Pugh also engineered the album. Cartel took a break from recording to support The Early November on their tour of the U.S. in October. On November 20, it was announced that Pugh was recording vocals. A week later, it was announced that Mount and Odom were mixing the album. (Note: Mount and Odom previously worked with the band producing Chroma (2005) and Cartel (2007).) In early January 2013 the album was being mastered. On January 15, the band revealed they had finished recording and that the artwork and track listing would be revealed soon.

== Release ==
On January 19, 2013 "Uninspired" was released as a single. Several songs were made available for streaming prior to the release of the album: "Mosaic" (February 19), "First Thing's First" (March 12), and "Disconnect" (March 20) Initially planned for a fall/winter release, Collider was self-released by the band on March 26. The band had brought the album to a handful of labels that turned it down due to them not "hav[ing] anything to with it." The album was available for streaming the day before on AOL. In the UK and Europe, the album was available with a bonus track, an acoustic version of "Thin Air".

Pugh revealed that the album had "a very solid first week", especially since "this entire project [was] being helmed by 5 people." The group paid a promotion/publicity to take control of duties a record label would typically perform. Guitarist Joseph Pepper was unsure how to promote the album besides tweeting about it. He named informing people about the album "the biggest challenge". The band knew that the album was not going to have retail distribution. On April 25, a lyric video was released for "Uninspired". The band supported New Found Glory on their Sticks and Stones anniversary tour in June. In the same month, Cartel toured with State Champs. Cartel toured the UK with support act Kids in Glass Houses in September and October. The band supported Mayday Parade on the Glamour Kills Tour in October and November.

== Reception ==
Reviewing the album for Idobi, Hannah Pierangelo said upon hearing it for the first time, it came across as "slightly bland", due to only half of the material "really carry[ing] any punch." Pierangelo noted that it was missing "the dynamic Cartel have proven they are capable of in previous albums." She counted that after several listens, the songs "grow on you" and show off more "substance beneath the surface". Overall, she said the band achieved "to make an impact once again".

Collider received a positive reaction from Cartel's fans. It charted at number 141 on the Billboard 200 chart, number 28 on the Independent Albums chart, and number 40 on the Rock Albums chart. "Uninspired" was included in Alternative Press' "Mid-Year Report 2013 – Best Songs" list.

== Track listing ==
1. "Second Chances" – 3:07
2. "Take Me with You" – 3:22
3. "First Things First" – 4:16
4. "Best Intentions" – 4:14
5. "Thin Air" – 3:37
6. "Uninspired" – 3:13
7. "Sympathy" – 3:46
8. "Mosaic" – 3:22
9. "Disconnect" – 3:15
10. "Collider" – 3:37
11. "A Thousand Suns" – 3:59

Bonus tracks

UK/Europe bonus track
No.	Title	Length
12.	"Thin Air" (acoustic)	3:40

Vinyl bonus track
No.	Title	Length
12.	"Sympathy" (acoustic)	3:46

== Personnel ==
Cartel

- Nic Hudson – rhythm guitar
- Joseph Pepper – lead guitar
- Will Pugh – vocals, bass guitar
- Kevin Sanders – drums

Production

- Will Pugh – producer, engineer
- Joseph Pepper – co-producer
- Kenneth Mount, Zack Odom – mixing
- Brad Blackwood – mastering

== Chart positions ==
Charts (2013)	Peak position
U.S. Billboard 200	141
U.S. Billboard Independent Albums	28
U.S. Billboard Rock Albums	40
