= Watashi Wa =

American Christian pop rock band

- Origin: San Luis Obispo, California, U.S.
- Genres: Rock; Christian rock; pop rock; pop
- Years active: 2000-2006, 2011, 2022–present
- Labels: Bettie Rocket, Tooth & Nail Records
- Members: Seth Roberts; Jeremy Wells; Jimmy Lopez; Matthew Wirt

Watashi Wa is a Christian pop rock band from San Luis Obispo, California on Tooth & Nail Records. "Watashi wa" (私は) in Japanese roughly means "I am".

The band formed in 1999 when most of the members were still in their teens. They were first signed to indie label Bettie Rocket and released two albums before signing to Tooth & Nail in 2002.

The band broke up in July 2004, but in a deal with Tooth & Nail Records singer/guitarist Seth Roberts' new band Eager Seas, were signed to the same label and released their first album under the name Watashi Wa. They subsequently left the label.

The band then changed names to Eager Seas (formerly Lakes) and were signed with The Militia Group who produced the Photographs EP.

Seth Roberts revived the Watashi Wa moniker with an album called People Like People which was written in 2020. People Like People is produced by Seth Roberts and co-produced by Tyler Tedeschi.

== Members ==
- Seth Roberts - Vocals, Guitar
- Jeremy Wells - Bass, Background Vocals
- Jimmy Lopez - Guitar, Background Vocals
- Matthew Wirt - Drums

=== Former members ===
- Mike Newsom - Guitar, Background Vocals
- Luke Page - Guitar, Background Vocals
- Xavier Alexander - Guitar (appears in "All of Me" music video)
- Cory Radosevich - Bass, Background Vocals
- Erik Brunner - Bass
- Richard Ruiz - Bass
- Jonthan Russo - Drums
- Danny Igarta - Bass
- Brendon Alvord- Guitar
- Kevin Alvord - Bass
- Luke Page - Guitar, Background Vocals
- Roger Tompkins - Bass
- Lane Biermann - Drums, Background Vocals
- Miles Castenholz - Guitar
- Teddy Ramirez - Drums
- Roger Tompkins - Guitar
- Tyler Tedeschi - Guitar

== Discography ==
- People Like People (2022, Tooth & Nail)
- Eager Seas (2006, Tooth & Nail)
- The Love of Life (2003, Tooth & Nail)
- The Color of Today EP (2003, Tooth & Nail)
- What's in the Way (2001, Bettie Rocket)
- Lost a Few Battles... Won the War (2000, Bettie Rocket)
- Stephen's First Day Out (1998, Harvey Records)

Other songs

- "Wonderful" (Released at PureVolume.com in 2004)
- "Message in a Bottle" (The Police cover, released on ¡Policia!: A Tribute to the Police in 2005)
- "Stories" (from 'Punk Never Dies' compilation, released in 2011)
