= In Stereo (EP) =

In Stereo EP

EP by Cartel
- Released: October 4, 2011
- Recorded: 2011
- Genres: Pop punk; alternative rock; rock
- Length: 14:33
- Label: Self-released
- Producer: Cartel

Cartel chronology
Cycles (2009)	In Stereo EP (2011)	Collider (2013)

Singles from Leave the Story Untold
- 1. "Lessons in Love" Released: July 26, 2011

In Stereo EP is Cartel's second EP and fifth release. The band released the recording independently on October 4, 2011 after a recent departure from Wind-up Records. It was their first release following the departure of bassist Jeff Lett earlier in the year.

== Track listing ==
No.	Title	Length
1.	"Lessons in Love"	2:55
2.	"American Dreams"	2:44
3.	"Conduit"	3:36
4.	"In Stereo"	2:45
5.	"Something to Believe"	2:37

Japan bonus tracks
No.	Title	Length
6.	"No Motivation"	2:56
7.	"Lessons in Love" (acoustic)	2:44
8.	"American Dreams" (acoustic)	2:42
9.	"In Stereo" (acoustic)	3:02
10.	"Something to Believe" (acoustic)	2:39

== Credits ==
- Will Pugh – Vocals, Guitar
- Kevin Sanders – Drums
- Joseph Pepper – Guitar
- Nic Hudson – Bass
