= Syml =

American musician (born 1983)

SYML
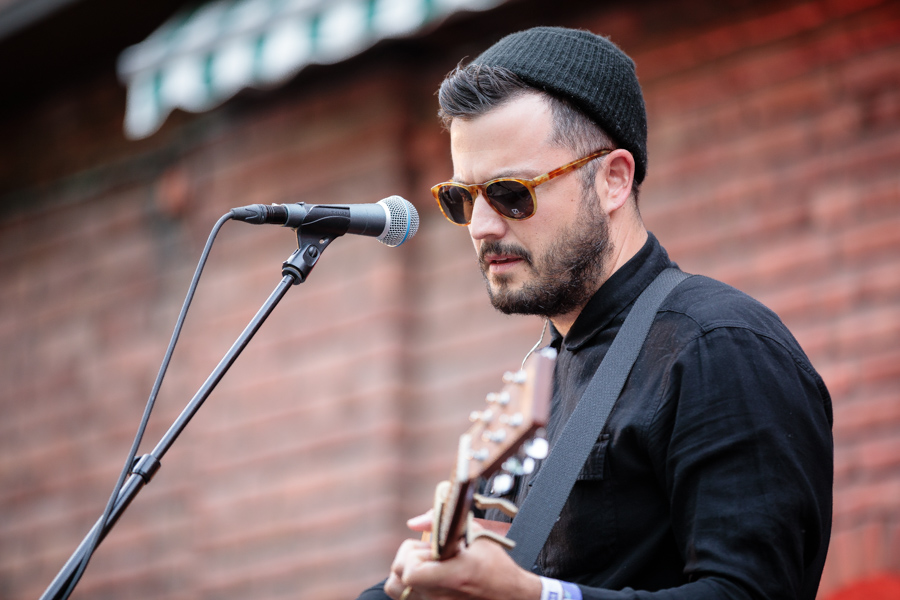
- Brian Fennell performing in Norway in 2018

Background information
- Born: Brian Leseney Fennell; January 16, 1983 (age 43); Issaquah, Washington, U.S.
- Genres: Alternative; indie; indie pop; pop
- Occupations: Musician; songwriter
- Instruments: Vocals; keyboards; guitar
- Years active: 2003-present
- Label: Nettwerk
- Spouse: Marion Fennell
- Website: symlmusic.com
- Children: 3

SYML (stylized in all caps) is the solo venture of Brian Leseney Fennell (born January 16, 1983), an American musician. He was previously part of the indie band Barcelona. SYML released his eponymous debut album on May 3, 2019, through Nettwerk Records.

== Early life ==
Brian Fennell was born on January 16, 1983, in Issaquah, Washington, to 17- and 18-year-old second generation Welsh immigrants. He was adopted soon thereafter. From a young age, he began studying classical piano, often playing in his grandmother's retirement home. He was raised a Christian but stopped following the religion during his teenage years. He began writing his own music when he was 18 years old, his first song being used as a coping mechanism after the death of a schoolmate. After high school, he attended Seattle Pacific University and graduated with a degree in music education with an emphasis in percussion. After years of living in and around Seattle, he returned to his hometown and resides there where he writes and produces out of a home studio.

== Career ==
=== Barcelona ===
In 2005, Fennell finished his first solo album Safety Songs. By the end of that year, he formed the band Barcelona with Brian Eichelberger, Chris Bristol, and Rhett Stonelake. Their debut album Absolutes was released in 2007. Universal Records signed Barcelona in 2008 and re-released Absolutes with four new songs in 2009. Their second LP, Not Quite Yours, was released in 2012. Barcelona disbanded after eight years.

=== SYML ===
After Barcelona, Fennell pivoted to more of a minimalist sound and using the moniker, SYML, which is Welsh for "simple" and pronounced "sim-muhl", inspired by his own personal heritage from his biological parents. His experience grappling with his adoption and heritage are influences in his songwriting.

SYML released his first EP, Hurt for Me, in 2016 with the singles “Fear of the Water” and “Where’s My Love”. The following year, Where’s My Love EP was released with multiple versions of the song, including an acoustic and the original version as well as a music video.

SYML released his self-titled debut album in 2019 that also included “Where’s My Love”. "Where's My Love" became a Platinum-certified single. In 2018, the song received Gold certification in Canada and Belgium, and held the number one spot on Canada's CBC Top 20 chart twice. To date, “Where’s My Love” has 1 billion streams on Spotify, entering the Billions Club playlist on the platform.

In November 2020, SYML released his fifth EP, You Knew It Was Me. It was accompanied by a short film of the same title, starring Emmy Newman and directed by Gavin Michael Booth. In 2021, SYML released his third body of work, titled Dim inspired by his late father's cancer diagnosis. Fennell believes the word 'dim' perfectly describes mourning, a theme he continues to visit throughout his work.

On February 3, 2023, SYML released his second album The Day My Father Died, which consists of 15 tracks. The album was produced by Phil Ek and includes collaborations with Lucius, Guy Garvey, Sara Watkins, and Charlotte Lawrence. Expanding on themes from his previous EP Dim, the album focuses on “what happens after we have lost.”

SYML collaborated with Lana Del Rey on the song "Paris, Texas", which was released on March 24, 2023, on the album Did You Know That There's a Tunnel Under Ocean Blvd. The song samples SYML's instrumental track "I Wanted to Leave" from his EP You Knew It Was Me.

In January 2025, SYML announced his third studio album, Nobody Lives Here, which was released on April 4, 2025. On the same day, SYML performed a special live concert at Le Consulat in Paris, FR to celebrate the release of the album. The concert was recorded and filmed and later released as a live album and concert film titled Paris Unplugged on September 26, 2025. Later that same year, SYML performed “Carry No Thing” live on WFUV.

=== Music sync ===
After his song "Where's My Love" was used on the drama TV show Teen Wolf, the song charted for 20 weeks on the Billboard Hot Rock Songs chart. SYML's "Wildfire" appeared in the Belgian teen drama web series wtFOCK, an adaptation of the Norwegian series SKAM. "Where's My Love" was featured prominently in the trailer for the 2018 film Adrift. SYMLs singles "Where's My Love", "Fear of Water" and "Body" were featured in the American supernatural drama television series Shadowhunters. In 2020, "Where's My Love" appeared in the movie Chemical Hearts. In Season 1 of Prime Video's German Original series Maxton Hall - The World Between Us, "Where's My Love" was featured in episode 3. SYML's "Carry No Thing" was written for Maxton Hall and was featured in season 2 episode 1.

== Personal life ==
Fennell and his wife, Marion Fennell, have three children. They live near Seattle, Washington.

Fennell's adoptive father died of cancer in 2021. His death inspired his album The Day My Father Died.

== Discography ==
=== Studio albums ===
Title	Year	Ref.
SYML	2019	
The Day My Father Died	2023	
Nobody Lives Here	2025	

=== Live albums ===
Title	Year	Ref.
Sacred Spaces	2021	
Live at Hangar 30	2024	

=== EPs ===
Title	Year	Ref.
Hurt for Me	2016	
Where's My Love	2017	
Hurt for Me (Piano & Strings)	2017	
In My Body	2018	
You Knew It Was Me	2020	
Dim	2021	
Ancient Call	2021	
How I Got Home	2023	
Infinity	2024	
The Morning After a Death	2026	

=== Singles ===
List of singles and peak chart positions
Title	Year	Peak chart positions					Certifications	Album
Title	Year	US Alt	US Adult Alt	BEL (FL)	NLD	SWI	Certifications	Album
"Mr. Sandman"	2017	—	—	—	—	—		non-album single
"Where's My Love"	2017	35	—	39	96	27	RIAA: 2× Platinum; ARIA: 2× Platinum; BPI: Platinum	Syml
"Clean Eyes"	2018	29	—	—	—	—		Syml
"Girl"	2019	—	—	—	—	—		Syml
"Symmetry"	2019	—	—	—	—	—		non-album singles
"Take Me Apart"	2019	—	—	—	—	—		non-album singles
"Flags"	2020	—	—	—	—	—		Wondering How It Ends
"True"	2021	—	—	—	—	—		non-album single
"Stay Close"	2021	—	—	—	—	—		Dim
"Sweet Home"	2022	—	—	—	—	—		non-album singles
"You and I" (featuring Charlotte Lawrence)	2022	—	—	—	—	—		non-album singles
"Have a Little Faith in Me"	2022	—	—	—	—	—		non-album singles
"Lost Myself" (solo or featuring Guy Garvey)	2022	—	—	—	—	—		non-album singles
"Howling" (featuring Lucius)	2022	—	—	—	—	—		non-album singles
"Better Part of Me" (featuring Sara Watkins)	2022	—	—	—	—	—		non-album singles
"I Wanted to Leave" (Sitar Version)(featuring Rishab Rikhiram Sharma)	2022	—	—	—	—	—		non-album singles
"Chariot"	2023	—	39	—	—	—		The Day My Father Died
"Believer"	2023	—	—	—	—	—		The Day My Father Died
"Tragic Magic" (Dream Version)	2023	—	—	—	—	—		The Day My Father Died
"All of Us"	2023	—	—	—	—	—		How I Got Home
"My Best Self" (with Elsa y Elmar)	2023	—	—	—	—	—		non-album singles
"The Walker"	2024	—	—	—	—	—		non-album singles
"Oblivion"	2024	—	—	—	—	—		Infinity
"How It Was It Will Never Be Again"	2025	—	—	—	—	—		Nobody Lives Here
"A100"	2025	—	—	—	—	—		Nobody Lives Here
"Careful"	2025	—	—	—	—	—		Nobody Lives Here
"Heartbreakdown"	2025	—	—	—	—	—		Nobody Lives Here
"Carry No Thing"	2025	—	—	—	—	—		Nobody Lives Here
"The White Light of the Morning"	2025	—	—	—	—	—		Nobody Lives Here

=== Guest appearances ===
Title	Year	Other artist(s)	Album
"Paris, Texas"	2023	Lana Del Rey	Did You Know That There's a Tunnel Under Ocean Blvd
