= Honestly (Cartel song) =

Single by Cartel

from the album Chroma
- Released: April 1, 2006
- Recorded: 2005
- Genre: Pop punk; emo
- Length: 3:29
- Label: The Militia Group; Epic
- Songwriter: Will Pugh
- Producers: Zack Odom; Kenneth Mount

Cartel singles chronology
"Honestly" (2006)	"Lose It" (2007)

"Honestly" is the debut single by American pop punk band Cartel, taken from their debut album, Chroma. The single was released in 2006. The song was first featured on MTV's Discover and Download throughout the summer months in the U.S. in 2006. The song was featured on the soundtrack for the film John Tucker Must Die. On December 21, 2006, the song was performed live on Total Request Live.

The song was certified gold by the Recording Industry Association of America in 2015.

== Reception ==
"Honestly" peaked at No. 89 on the U.S. Billboard Hot 100; charted at No. 26 on the U.S. Pop Songs chart; and peaked at No. 65 on the Hot Digital Songs chart.

== Music video ==
The music video for "Honestly" was directed by David Ahuja.

The video features the band performing in a room covered in post-it notes and photos. While they play, various people get on a computer, apparently checking their status on a social media or dating website. The people begin taking various pictures of themselves to upload to their page and several of them notice each other's pictures, pairing off into three couples. The first couple features a man and a pretty blonde girl, where he spots her across the street while waiting for a light. When they pass each other, she looks at him, causing him to quickly look away as she walks on, leaving him to look after her in doubt. The second couple shows a man and woman getting on the same subway train where the man notices the woman on the other side of a man between them. When she notices him looking at him, he looks away as well. The woman then gets off at a station and he goes to follow her but the door closes and the train pulls off before he can. The third and final couple features a nerdy couple where the woman notices the man sitting down while reading in the library. When he notices her, she quickly looks back into her book. She later leaves, watching him and he looks after her as she leaves. The video ends with the various people getting back on the computer, the members from the three couples disappointed in themselves.

== Track listing ==
1. "Honestly" – 3:29

== Chart positions ==
=== Weekly charts ===
Chart (2007)	Peak position
US Billboard Hot 100	89
US Pop Airplay (Billboard)	26

== Certifications ==
Region	Certification	Certified units/sales
United States (RIAA)	Gold	500,000^{‡}
^{‡} Sales+streaming figures based on certification alone.

== Release history ==
Country	Date	Format	Label	Ref.
United States	April 1, 2006	Alternative radio	Epic	
United States	August 8, 2006	CD single	Epic	
United States	September 19, 2006	Contemporary hit radio	Epic	
