= Controlling the Famous =

Los Angeles, California-based indie rock band

- Origin: Los Angeles, California, United States
- Genres: Indie rock, post-rock
- Years active: 2001–2007
- Label: The Militia Group
- Past members: Max Hellman; Johnny Collins; Brendan Hughes; Mike Schneider

Controlling the Famous was a Los Angeles, California-based indie rock band formed in 2001. After signing with The Militia Group, the band recorded the album Automatic City, which was released on May 16, 2006. The band split up in 2007.

== History ==
The band was formed in 2001 by college students and neighbors Max Hellmann (guitar, vocals), Johnny Collins (guitar, vocals), and Brendan Hughes (bass guitar). After parting ways with their original drummer, Louis Laoudis, the band recruited drummer Mike Schneider in 2004. Their first release was the EPMaybe It Won't Kill You, But Probably It Might in 2002. A split EP with Operatic in 2003 was followed by another self-released EP, Two Birds vs. One Stone, in 2005. The band then signed to The Militia Group in October 2005 and began working on their debut album, Automatic City, with producer Alex Newport. The album was released in May 2006. The album received generally positive reviews, with Allmusic writer Corey Apar giving it four stars, and calling it "a consistently enjoyable listen", with Alternative Press writer Emily Zemler giving it the same score and describing it "as jagged and propulsive as any post-punk/hardcore album in recent memory". PopMatters writer Evan Sawdey gave the album five out of ten, calling it "a mixture of highs and lows".

In October 2006 the band went on hiatus, and after briefly working together in early 2007, announced that they had split up in February.

Members of Controlling the Famous have moved onto new bands in the Los Angeles area. Drummer Mike Schneider now produces music as Barstool Astronaut, and Max Hellmann played guitar in the bands Handshakes and Hotel for Strangers, with members of the defunct bands Wintergreen and Sputnik Monroe.

== Members ==
- Brendan Hughes (bass guitar)
- Johnny Collins (vocals/guitar)
- Max Hellmann (vocals/guitar)
- Mike Schneider (drums)

== Other members ==
- Louis Laoudis (drums)
- Tony Ostrowski (keyboards)

== Discography ==
- The Magnet EP (EP) 2002
- Maybe It Won't Kill You, But Probably It Might (EP) 2002
- We Are Bounty Hunters for Hire (EP) 2003
- Two Birds vs. One Stone (EP) 2005
- Automatic City (album) 2006
