= The Panic Division =

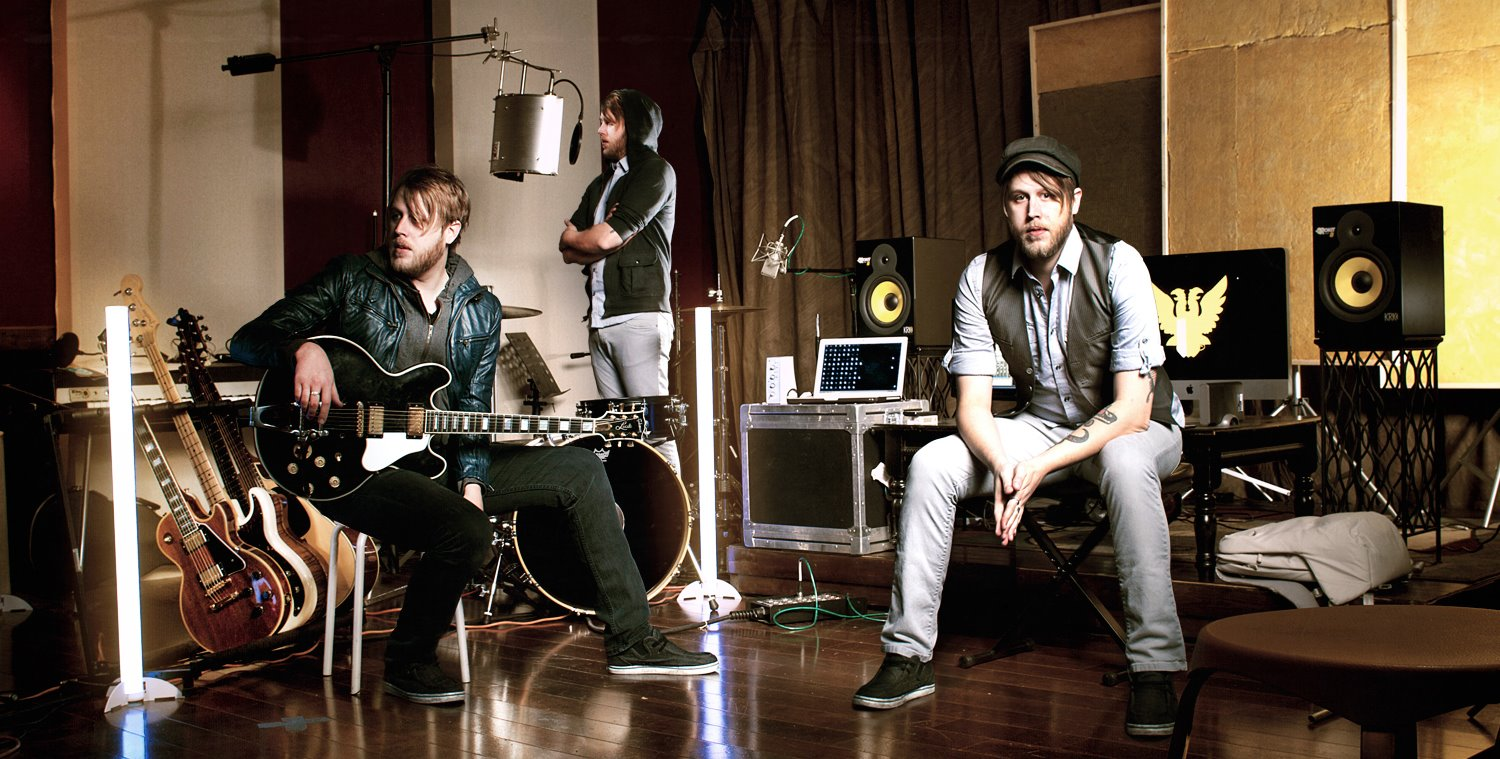

Background information
- Origin: San Antonio, Texas, U.S.
- Genres: Alternative rock, Atmospheric Alternative/Electronic Rock
- Years active: 2005–present
- Label: The Militia Group (2005-2008) Independent (2008-present)
- Members: Colton Holliday - sole writer, vocals, guitar, bass, electronics / programming Tavis Wilson - bass Joe Ramos - drums

The Panic Division is an American alternative rock band from San Antonio, Texas.

== History ==
The Panic Division was formed by three members of the post-hardcore group Carbon 12 Theory, who added a drummer and keyboardist to their lineup to form the present group. The group moved towards a more electronic, synthpop sound and released their debut, Versus, on The Militia Group, who signed them to a multi-album deal, in November 2005. Several of the songs they had recorded on Carbon 12 Theory's full-length 2003 release, 20 Years Unfold, were re-recorded for the Versus album. The band was named SPIN Band of the Day on November 1, 2005. The group toured extensively behind the record. Drummer James Castillo left the band and was replaced by Jesse Garcia. Their sophomore effort, Songs from the Glasshouse, was released in 2007, also on Militia. Shortly after the release of the album however, Daniel Stanush left the band, leaving them looking for a replacement. In February 2008 the band announced a hiatus while Colton Holliday completed a solo electronic project.

On New Year's Eve 2008, Colton posted a new song called "Easier" on The Panic Division Myspace-page. The song was said to appear on Colton's new solo album but hinted that it could be released as a new Panic Division record.

January 27, 2009, it was announced that The Panic Division had posted the almost entire new record (a 7-song EP) on Myspace, adding that the EP would be released as a digital download via iTunes & Amazon etc. on March 1, 2009.

On July 29, 2009, Colton announced a "Panic Division Come-Back Show" to take place on August 29, 2009, at the Scout Bar in San Antonio, TX. It is said that the new "Sleepwalker album will be performed, along with some oldies." New graphics also appeared on the band's MySpace page, potentially indicative of the end of the band's hiatus.

In July 2010, Colton announced that The Panic Division is currently recording a new album and revealed the title of the new album to be "Eternalism" in early 2011. A new song called "Silver Rings" was released in the summer 2011 and was followed with more info during the autumn regarding track listing and release date. On December 29, 2011, Colton revealed that the album will be released on February 7, 2012.

On September 6, 2012, 7 months after releasing "Eternalism", Colton revealed on their Facebook-page that the band had started writing new material for a tentative spring 2013 release as a second EP. A new single was released on 26 September 2012, called "Photograph". "Photograph" is a b-side off the 2012 album, Eternalism.

In November 2014, Colton revealed the band had written and recorded two songs for a new Panic Division record. In late April 2015, Colton announced the band was heading to the studio to record four songs for the new record. As of May 2015, the Panic Division had written and recorded 8 new tracks and hope to release the album by the end of 2015.

In June 2015, Colton announced the new album will be called "Aero.Nautical". It will feature eleven new songs and is expected to be released in Fall 2015.

On August 19, 2015, Colton announced the new album, "Aero.Nautical" will be released on October 2, 2015, through all digital media outlets.

In January 2016, Colton announced the new EP, "TRU2TH" will be released on March 11, 2016.

As of January 2017, the Panic Division officially began work on their upcoming 7th studio release.

The Panic Division will be releasing their new album, "Touch" on June 14, 2019. Their first single, "Graveyards" debuted on April 26, 2019.

Since 2022, Colton Holliday has been writing and recording a new album, which currently has no confirmed release date. The record has been described as a darker follow-up to 2019’s Touch. In late 2024, Colton stated that seven tracks had been completed for a planned 10-12 song album. As of November 2026, very few updates have been made available, leaving the release of the new record uncertain.

== Members ==
Current members

- Colton Holliday - primary songwriter, lead vocals, rhythm guitar, electronics/programming
- Octavio Gonzalez - guitar
- Joe Ramos - drums
- Tavis Wilson - bass

Former members

- Carlos Herrera - drums
- James Castillo - drums
- Daniel Stanush - guitar
- Khary Alexander - keyboards (live only)
- Jesse Garcia - drums
- Diego Chavez - keyboards / programming
- Michael Morin - bass
- Noe Carmona - guitar

== Discography ==
- Versus (The Militia Group, 2005)
- Songs from the Glasshouse (The Militia Group, 2007)
- Sleepwalker (Independent, 2009)
- Eternalism (Independent, 2012)
- Aero.Nautical (Independent, 2015)
- TRU2TH (Independent, 2016)
- Touch (Independent, 2019)
- Untitled New Album (Independent, 2027)

== Track listing ==
TRU2TH (2016)
No.	Title	Length
1.	"Youth in Motion"	5:16
2.	"Don't Stop Now"	3:41
3.	"Quiet Now"	4:26
4.	"Swim"	4:00
5.	"Drive"	3:28
6.	"Pretender (Remixed)"	2:50

Aero.Nautical (2015)
No.	Title	Length
1.	"Dawning"	1:15
2.	"Spinning Around the Wheel"	3:41
3.	"The Key is Forever"	4:10
4.	"Shadows"	4:30
5.	"Love Me Right"	5:35
6.	"The Past Only Lingers"	4:21
7.	"Heavy Hands"	4:15
8.	"Mercy"	3:43
9.	"When the Night Calls Out"	4:05
10.	"Through the Dark"	3:52
11.	"Home"	3:52

Eternalism (2012)
No.	Title	Length
1.	"Marching Tide"	1:58
2.	"Silver Rings"	4:11
3.	"The Miracle In You"	4:29
4.	"The Labor Of Love"	4:13
5.	"Shut Up And Leap"	4:01
6.	"No Power Great Enough"	3:51
7.	"Too Young To Fall"	3:34
8.	"Melody Ave"	4:45
9.	"Bleed"	2:25
10.	"Lifeline"	3:50
11.	"The Heart Is In Bloom"	3:51
12.	"Fireflies"	4:40
13.	"Easier"	3:56

Sleepwalker EP (2009)
No.	Title	Length
1.	"Easier"	3:57
2.	"Shut Up And Leap"	4:00
3.	"Melody Ave"	4:38
4.	"Fever"	3:45
5.	"When Your World Turns Around"	4:25
6.	"Dark Days"	3:22
7.	"Pretender"	2:54

Songs From The Glasshouse (2007)
No.	Title	Length
1.	"Intro"	1:50
2.	"Here We Go"	3:12
3.	"Polysix"	5:10
4.	"Your Satellite"	5:57
5.	"Big Day"	3:38
6.	"Stay"	3:57
7.	"From The Top"	4:24
8.	"The Pieces That Mattered"	3:08
9.	"Legacy"	3:21
10.	"Day You Left"	5:35
11.	"Stay (Reprise)"	2:58
12.	"Broken Wings"	7:05
13.	"A Killer Is Born"	4:23
14.	"Darkside Of You"	5:23

Versus (2005)
No.	Title	Length
1.	"Versus"	3:51
2.	"Goodbyes"	4:09
3.	"Automatic Synthetic"	4:05
4.	"Paradise"	3:52
5.	"Songs Of A Dead Poet"	4:41
6.	"Little Child"	2:39
7.	"Sweet Division"	3:35
8.	"Easy Target"	4:15
9.	"Questions & Answers"	4:17
10.	"Delta"	3:28
11.	"DWI"	4:13
