= Lakes (band) =

American indie rock band

Eager Seas
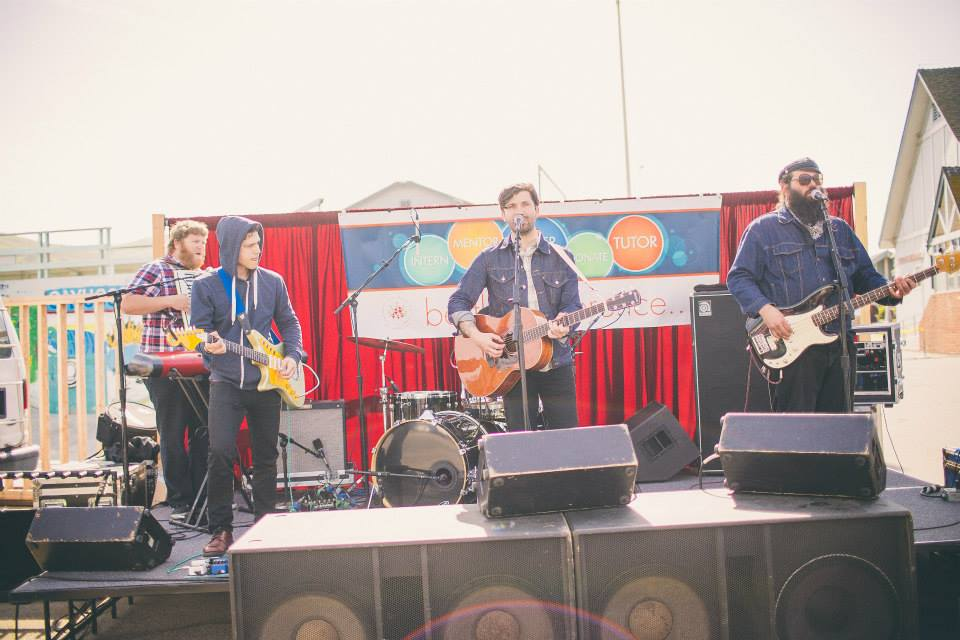
- The Lakes in 2016. (LtoR: Matthew Covington, Jacob Wick, Seth Roberts, Jeremy Wells)

Background information
- Origin: Atascadero, California, United States
- Genre: Indie rock
- Years active: 2004–present
- Label: The Militia Group
- Spinoff of: Watashi Wa
- Members: Seth Roberts; Jacob Wick; Matthew Covington; Jeremy Wells; Teddy Ramirez
- Website: eagerseas.com

Eager Seas (formerly known as Lakes) is an American indie rock band, formed in June 2006 in Atascadero, California, consisting mainly of the former band members of Watashi Wa. They were signed to The Militia Group and on September 5, 2006, released a five-song EP named Photographs EP. They are now independent as of their latest release in 2018

Seth Roberts, the lead vocalist of Watashi Wa, formed a new ensemble called Eager Seas after Watashi Wa's 2004 break-up, but the subsequent album was released under the name Watashi Wa in 2006. Roberts then left Tooth & Nail Records and signed with The Militia Group, with the new ensemble renamed Lakes.

Their first show was played at the Cornerstone festival in 2006, where they also sold a limited number (200 copies) of their EP. This was more than a month before the official release date. The EP, released in September 2006, featured guest appearances by Mike Herrera of MxPx and Aaron Marsh of Copeland. Lakes uploaded a new song on MySpace on August 24, entitled "The Heart Is An Anchor".

On August 11, 2010, Lakes announced the release of their full-length album, The Agreement. The album was released on September 3, 2010, and featured 14 tracks.

March 19, 2015, Lakes announced via the Facebook page that they would return to their original name, Eager Seas.

Eager Seas released their latest Album "Mine As Well" on Nov 30, 2018.

== Band members ==
Current members

- Seth Roberts - Vocals, Guitar, Mandolin, Keyboards
- Jeremy Wells - Bass, Vocals
- Miles Castenholz - Guitar
- Theodore Ramirez - Drums

Former members

- Jacob Wick - Drums, Vocals, Guitar, Violin, Keyboards
- Matthew Covington - Vocals, Accordion, Piano, Mandolin, Guitar
- Jason Massey - Vocals, Guitar, Drums, Piano, Keyboards
- Roger Tompkins - Bass, Background Vocals
- Simon Jones - Bass
- Kevin Foster - Vocals, Mandolin, Guitar
- Justin Sears - Drums
- Aaron Wick - Drums
- Seth Igarta - Bass

== Discography ==
- Photographs EP (2006, The Militia Group)
- The Agreement (2010)
- Fire Ahead (2014)
- California Christmas EP (2014)
- Mine As Well (2018)
