= Lost for Words =

Lost for Words may refer to:

== Film and television ==
- Lost for Words (1999 film), a British TV film
- Lost for Words (2013 film), a Hong Kong/American romantic drama

== Literature ==
- Lost for Words, a 1991 autobiography by Deric Longden, basis for the 1999 film
- Lost for Words, a 2004 book on language by John Humphrys
- Lost for Words, a 2014 novel by Edward St Aubyn

== Music ==
=== Albums ===
- Lost for Words, by Deniz Tek, 2018
- Lost for Words, by Mach One, 1984
- Lost for Words, an EP by Acceptance, 2000

=== Songs ===
- "Lost for Words" (Pink Floyd song), 1994
- "Lost for Words" (Ronan Keating song), 2003
- "Lost for Words", by Saga from 20/20, 2012

== See also ==
- A Loss for Words, an American pop punk band from Massachusetts
