= The Dance Party =

American pop rock band

- Origin: Washington, D.C., U.S.
- Genres: Rock, dance-punk, power pop
- Years active: 2005–present
- Labels: HellYa! Records; Atlantic Records
- Members: Kevin Bayly; Mick Coogan; Jon Jester; Dave "Moose" Kuehl
- Past members: Danny Hoag; Jeff David; Drew Doucette; Rishi Chakrabarty; Chuck Robarty; Taylor Royle
- Website: The Dance Party's Myspace

The Dance Party is an American pop rock band from Washington, D.C.

== The Dance Party ==
=== Formation, EP, Friction! Friction Friction! ===
The Dance Party was formed in 2005 in College Park, Maryland by vocalist Mick Coogan, guitarist Kevin Bayly, drummer Jeff David, and bassist Danny Hoag, and soon released their first EP, The Dance Party EP. After building a reputation in the D.C. area and throughout the Mid-Atlantic for partying and “over-the-top” live performances, The Dance Party self-released their full-length record Friction! Friction! Friction! in July 2007. In late 2007, the band rounded out their live show by adding keyboardist Drew Doucette of Beauty Pill as a full-time member.

=== Tigers EP ===
In 2008, the band recorded an unreleased album with Andros Rodriguez which was later released as the five-song EP Tigers in a limited pressing containing the song "Sasha Don't Sleep." On November 14, 2011, the band announced that Tigers would be released in its entirety on December 23, 2011.

Music from Tigers has been featured on such television series as The Jersey Shore, The Real World, and Keeping Up with the Kardashians.

After the departure of David and Hoag in early 2009, the band added former Driving East drummer Jon Jester and bassist Rishi Chakrabarty to the line up.

=== Touch ===
In 2009, the band signed with HellYa! Records/Atlantic Records and moved to Los Angeles, CA to record their major label debut with producers Warren Huart, Luke Walker, and Julian Bunetta. The album was mixed by Tim Palmer at '62 Studios

During the production of Touch, both Doucette and Chakrabarty left the band. After auditioning and performing with a series of new bassists, Dave "Moose" Kuehl joined the lineup in February 2010, just before the band's series of performances at SXSW 2010. Leading up to the release of Touch, the band embarked on a national tour, playing select dates with Atomic Tom. On September 28, 2010, The Dance Party released "Touch" as their first mainstream studio album.

In October 2010, The Dance Party played CMJ.

In January 2011, The Dance Party went on a bicoastal North American tour with Wallpaper. and K.Flay.

In 2011, The Dance Party played all 44 dates of the Vans Warped Tour, personally invited by tour founder Kevin Lyman to perform on the Kevin Says Stage.

=== Tigers (2011) ===
On November 14, 2011, The Dance Party announced that a full, ten-song version of Tigers would be released on December 23, 2011, beginning with the digital release of "Sing Your Song" on November 18, 2011. This album was composed of archival material recorded from 2008 to 2009.

== Brett ==
After the release of Tigers, the band announced a temporary name change to Brett due to the difference in sound of their newly written sounds. They initially reassured that the Dance Party was not finished, only temporarily changed. However, this was not the case, and the Dance Party permanently became Brett upon releasing their self-titled debut album on May 20, 2014, through Cascine Records.

Shortly after the release of "Brett," Mick Coogan left Washington, D.C. and moved to Los Angeles. He stopped collaborating with Kevin Bayly due to distance and began working with Scott Dittrich on all subsequent albums. Since Brett they have released: Mode (2016), Die Young (2016), Mustangs (2017), Half (2018), Perfect Patterns (2019), THX (2019), Aquamarine (2021), and many singles.

== Members ==
=== The Dance Party ===
- Mick Coogan – Vocals, Synthesizers
- Kevin Bayly – Guitars, Synthesizers, Programming
- Jon Jester – Drums
- David "Moose" Kuehl – Bass

=== Brett ===
- Mick Coogan
- Scott Dittrich

== Discography ==
=== Albums ===
==== The Dance Party ====
- Friction! Friction! Friction! (2007)
- Touch (2010)
- Tigers (2011)

==== Brett ====
- Brett (2014)
- Mode (2016)

=== EPs ===
==== The Dance Party ====
- The Dance Party EP (2005)
- Tigers (2009)

==== Brett ====
- Die Young (2016)
- Mustangs (2017)
- Half (2018)
- Perfect Patterns (2019)
- THX (2019)
- Aquamarine (2021)
