= Chroma (album) =

Studio album by Cartel
- Released: September 20, 2005
- Recorded: May–June 2005
- Studios: Tree Sound, Atlanta, Georgia
- Genres: Pop; pop punk; rock
- Length: 49:50
- Label: The Militia Group
- Producers: Zack Odom, Kenneth Mount, Cartel

Cartel chronology
The Ransom EP (2004)	Chroma (2005)	Live Dudes (2006)

Singles from Chroma
- 1. "Honestly" Released: April 1, 2006

Chroma is the debut studio album by the American rock band Cartel. Formed in mid-2003, they self-released an EP the following year. Shortly afterwards founding guitarist Andy Lee left the band and was replaced by Nic Hudson. Following a performance at a music conference in Atlanta, the band signed to The Militia Group. With songs planned out, the band went to record with producers Zack Odom and Kenneth Mount. Recording took place at Tree Sound Studios in Atlanta in May and June 2005. Chroma released through The Militia Group in September 2005. The album sold 3,000 copies in its first week and charted at number 140 on the Billboard 200 chart. Chroma is the only full-length Cartel album to feature bassist Ryan Roberts, who departed the band in 2006.

== Background ==
Cartel formed in August 2003 in Atlanta. The band consisted of vocalist Will Pugh, bassist Ryan Roberts, drummer Kevin Sanders, and guitarists Joseph Pepper and Andy Lee. The members had known each other since high school and had played in various bands before Cartel. Cartel self-released The Ransom EP in March 2004. Lee wrote half the songs on the EP. Pugh, Roberts, Sanders and Pepper considered themselves a "tight-knit group". The band thought Lee, who had joined later, did not fit in with the rest of them. Pugh explained that "With someone like Andy, [...] it's gonna lead to peoples' feelings getting hurt." Nic Hudson, who had nearly joined the army before the band asked him to join, replaced Lee.

In July 2004 Cartel played at the Atlantis Music Conference in Atlanta, which was witnessed by Rory Felton from The Militia Group. The band signed to The Militia Group in September 2004, who re-released their EP. They recorded a demo of "Honestly" as a "kind of trial thing" with Zack Odom and Kenneth Mount as the band were looking for producers for their upcoming debut. In September, the band toured with My American Heart, A Second Chance and All Rights Reserved. In January and February 2005 the band supported As Tall as Lions and The Receiving End of Sirens on their U.S. tour. The band posted the "Honestly" demo on their PureVolume account in March. In April, Cartel went on the Family Affair tour with label mates Brandtson, The Rocket Summer, and Umbrellas.

== Writing and recording ==
"Say Anything (Else)", "Honestly" and "Settle Down" were written in summer 2004. They featured new riffs not on their earlier versions. Cartel had planned out all the songs before they went into the studio to record. Pugh mentioned there was "pressure" because Lee was no longer a member of the band. Despite him being "just one small part" of the band, "he definitely brought riffs". For a majority of the songs, Pugh came up with the basic form, "a verse, chord progression, chorus, melody, things like that". He is credited with writing all the lyrics, while the songs are credited to the band. Demos were recorded in five hours.

The album was recorded at Tree Sound Studios, in Atlanta, Georgia, over the course of eight days between May 18 and June 21, 2005. The band co-produced the album with producers Zack Odom and Kenneth Mount. (Note: The band would later play with Mount and Odom on Cartel (2007) and Collider (2013).) The pair also engineered and mixed the album. The drums were recorded in a room called The Cave. Gavin Lurssen mastered the album at The Mastering Lab in Hollywood, California. Pugh later thought the band "didn't really have a lot of time" to record the album. He called the recording process "really strained" and filled with "a lot of stress". Pugh considered the album "a big step up" from the band's EP.

== Music and lyrics ==
Pugh was dating a girl while they were in college and shortly afterwards went on tour. The pair broke up because Pugh did not know how long he would be on tour. A year after they broke up, the girl began dating another guy, much to Pugh's annoyance. It "just ate at me so hard" and as a result Pugh wrote "Honestly". While the band were working on "Honestly" Pugh thought "it just wasn't quite sounding right". Instead he used the vocal track from the demo on the album version. He felt "It matched up perfectly, which was sweet!" "Burn This City" is about the band getting out of town and having other people tell them they could not. "Save Us" was the first piano song Pugh wrote. The melody for the song came while Pugh was messing around with a piano at Pepper's house. The song was originally in the key of C, but the band changed it to G "in order to keep as little black keys out of it as possible". Odom plays the strings on the song and also "The Minstrel's Prayer".

"Luckie St." was originally recorded for The Ransom EP, but was re-recorded for Chroma. "If I Fail", according to Pugh, "was kind of the same thing" as "Honestly". For "The Minstrel's Prayer", Pugh played all the acoustic guitars. With "A" the band knew what they wanted to do with the track. It features choruses of other songs on the album. They wanted the album to end "with an ellipsis, where you can be expecting other things and not just really closing it off". The inspiration for this was Jimmy Eat World's "Goodbye Sky Harbor". "A" features programmed drums taken from André 3000's MP3 player, which he left at the studio. All of the programming was done by Pugh. According to him, the band were "messing around" with the MP3 player and the programmed drums they found on it were "good so we were like, 'Cool, let's just use this!'" Mount provided additional programming on "Q" and "A", while Julia Kugel recorded additional vocals for the two songs. David Webers plays trumpets on "A".

== Artwork and packaging ==
Randall Jenkins from The Militia Group and Cartel handled the art direction. Jenkins created the artwork for the album. It was initially going to be printed on vellum, similar to what Copeland had used for their Beneath Medicine Tree (2003) album. Due to the cost this was not done. Pugh said that "it really didn't reflect the overall idea of the artwork we had in the long run". The band scrapped this and went for "hi-res photos and things like that", a concept which came from Chris Donahue, Pugh and Jenkins. Jenkins produced all the photographs and compiled them. Jenkins also did the design and layout. Zack Arias of Usedfilm took the band photograph. The Militia Group edition of the album is in a jewel case with a slipcase, while the Epic edition is only in a jewel case. The vinyl edition is in a gatefold sleeve in a die-cut slipcover.

== Release ==
Cartel had attracted major label attention before the album was released. On June 25, 2005, Chroma was announced for release in three months' time; its track listing was posted online. Following this, the band joined Acceptance, the Receiving End of Sirens and Panic! at the Disco on the Take Cover tour. On September 6, 2005, the album was made available for streaming. The Militia Group released Chroma on September 20. In November 2005, they went on a tour of Japan with Oceanlane and Buddhiston, which was followed by a stint in the US with the Working Title and Terminal. Cartel went on the Screaming Is for Babies Tour co-headlining with Copeland with support from the Starting Line and Gatsbys American Dream in February, March and April 2006.

On February 2, 2006, Cartel released a video for "Honestly". The idea for the video came from some of the band's old high school friends. They signed to Epic Records in March 2006, who wanted the band to re-shoot their live performance for the "Honestly" video, which ended up costing $20,000. On June 8, 2006, it was announced that Roberts had left the band. Jeff Lett filled in his position. The band played on the 2006 edition of Warped Tour. On August 8, "Honestly" was released as a single. In October and November 2006, the band supported New Found Glory on their headlining US tour. The band went on a headlining tour in February 2007 with support from Boys Like Girls, Cobra Starship, Quietdrive, Permanent Me and New Atlantic.

== Reception and legacy ==
Professional ratings
Review scores
Source	Rating
AbsolutePunk	(86%)
AllMusic	3.5/5 stars
LAS Magazine	5/10
Melodic	3.5/5 stars
Punknews.org	4/5 stars
Spin	Favorable
Yahoo! Music	Favorable

Chroma sold over 3,000 copies in its first week, becoming The Militia Group's most successful artist release. By August 2006, the album had sold over 100,000 copies. Its success was due to the band's online fan base and their use of Myspace, according to the vice president of marketing at Epic. By February 2007, the album had sold 183,000 copies, and by October 2009 over 250,000 copies. In an interview with Alternative Press in May 2015, Pugh reckoned that album sales stood around "280 [to] 290,000 copies [sold]". The album charted in the U.S. at number 140 on the Billboard 200, number two on the Heatseekers Albums chart and number 38 on the Independent Albums chart. "Honestly" charted at number 26 on the Pop Songs chart, number 65 on the Digital Songs chart and number 89 on the Hot 100. Alternative Press included "Luckie St." on its "Windows Down - 11 Summer Driving Songs" list.

On February 2, 2015, Cartel announced a headlining anniversary tour that took place between April and May in the U.S. It was the band's first headlining tour in four years. Hit the Lights, TEAM* and Driver Friendly supported the band. They played one London date in May as part of the tour. Cartel also announced an anniversary vinyl of Chroma would be available for pre-sale. Field Day released a limited edition of 1,000 copies of the vinyl. On April 16, "Honestly" was certified gold for selling 500,000 copies. To celebrate this, the band released a 7" vinyl with an acoustic version of the song as a B-side.

To celebrate the album's 20th anniversary, Cartel released a re-recorded version of the album on September 12, 2025 via Field Day Records. The re-recorded album features new guest vocals from Cassadee Pope of Hey Monday.

== Track listing ==
All lyrics by Will Pugh. All songs by Cartel.

1. "Say Anything (Else)" – 3:48
2. "Honestly" – 3:30
3. "Runaway" – 2:53
4. "Matter of Time" – 3:22
5. "Burn This City" – 4:20
6. "Save Us" – 4:52
7. "Luckie St." – 3:34
8. "Settle Down" – 3:05
9. "If I Fail" – 3:40
10. "The Minstrel's Prayer" – 4:38
11. "Q" – 2:34
12. "A" – 9:45

== Personnel ==
Personnel per booklet.

Cartel

- Will Pugh – vocals, guitar, piano, programming
- Joseph Pepper – guitars
- Nic Hudson – guitars
- Kevin Sanders – drums
- Ryan Roberts – bass

Additional musicians

- Zack Odom – strings on "Save Us" and "The Minstrel's Prayer"
- Kenneth Mount – additional programming on "Q" and "A"
- Julia Kugel – additional vocals on "Q" and "A"
- David Webers – trumpets on "A"

Production

- Zack Odom, Kenneth Mount – producer, engineer, mixing
- Cartel – co-producer, art direction
- Gavin Lurssen – mastering
- Randall Jenkins – art direction, design, layout, photography
- Zack Arias – band photograph

== Chart positions ==
Charts (2005–6)	Peak position
U.S. Billboard 200	140
U.S. Billboard Heatseekers Albums	2
U.S. Billboard Independent Albums	38
