= The Beautiful Mistake =

American post-hardcore band

- Origin: San Diego, California, U.S.
- Genres: Post-hardcore, emo, alternative rock
- Years active: 2000–2006, 2018–present
- Label: The Militia Group
- Members: Josh Hagquist (vocals, guitar), Andy Lara (guitar), Steve Dunlap (guitar), Jon Berndtson (bass, vocals), Josh Quesada (drums)
- Past members: Caleb Nason, Randy Schulte, Armin Tchami, Rusty Fuller, Bobby Lee A. Hansen, Josh Ressel

The Beautiful Mistake is an American rock band from San Diego, California. Formed in 2000, the band has released two full-length albums: the 2002 debut album, Light a Match, For I Deserve to Burn, and 2004's This Is Who You Are. They have released four EPs and had various songs featured on different compilation albums.

== History ==
The band was formed by Josh Hagquist and Shawn Grover following the breakup of their previous band, Ember. It went through numerous member changes throughout the 2000s with Hagquist (vocals–guitar) remaining the constant in each incarnation. The Beautiful Mistake released albums on SideCho Records, The Militia Group and Reignition Records and had songs and videos featured on releases by Victory Records and Hopeless Records. The band also had their two full-length albums re-released in Europe on Sorepoint/Eat Sleep Records and in Asia on Bigmouth Japan. The Beautiful Mistake toured with numerous hardcore, punk and rock bands including Further Seems Forever, Brand New, Hopesfall, Elliott, Funeral For A Friend, As Cities Burn, Fall Out Boy, Senses Fail, Moneen, Every Time I Die, Open Hand, Glasseater, Brandtson, Anberlin, The Myriad, Copeland, and Emery to name a few. They were also able to share the stage with bands like Snapcase, Shelter, Common Rider, Underoath, Atreyu, Avenged Sevenfold, and BoySetsFire during their extensive touring of the U.S. They also made repeated appearances at CMJ fest in New York and SXSW in Austin Texas. They had songs featured on numerous television shows on Mtv, Vh1 and the WB network. In 2005 The Beautiful Mistake were included in the movie "Bastards of Young" released on Art & Industry Films. The movie showcased the growing post-hardcore DIY music scene and also included interviews and performances from Taking Back Sunday, Thursday, Midtown, Jimmy Eat World, and Armor For Sleep. Interviews were taped at the annual Surf & Skate Festival in New Jersey in 2004. The Beautiful Mistake stopped touring in late 2005.

In the Summer of 2008 Josh, Shawn and Armin Tchami reunited for an acoustic set at Tomfest and played songs from every release.

Since 2006, Hagquist has played bass guitar in The Lassie Foundation, from Los Angeles. Josh also plays guitar in The Stranger Kings from Orange County, California, and is currently recording his own music under the name Saint Valletta with Josh Quesada on drums. Josh Quesada plays in a band from Longmont, Co called Light The Letters. He also produces and records artist out of his studio in Colorado. Jon Berndtson played guitar in Cue the Doves and performed vocals in two bands, Get Young and Years Spent, all from Minneapolis, Minnesota.

The Beautiful Mistake (Josh Hagquist, Shawn Grover, Jon Berndtson, Josh Quesada) played two reunion shows in Southern California in late March 2018. This was the first time since 2004 that all of them had played together. The first show was at the Chain Reaction in Anaheim, and the second was at Brick By Brick in San Diego.

in 2018 The Beautiful Mistake started working on new songs. Included in the line-up was original guitar player, Steve Dunlap. These sessions turned out the music for their EP, "You're Not Broken, I Am."

In May 2019 The Beautiful Mistake recorded a yet unnamed 5 song EP with Beau Burchell in Temecula, California.

January 2020 The Beautiful Mistake announced their new EP "You're Not Broken, I Am" will be released on Wire Tap Records in the US, and Disconnect Disconnect Records in the UK/EU. The first single "Memento Mori" was released on January 27 exclusively on Kerrang!

In September 2021 The Beautiful Mistake played Furnace Fest in Birmingham, Alabama. Their set included songs from "Light A Match...", "This Is Who You Are", and their newest EP "You're Not Broken. I Am."

The Beautiful Mistake played Furnace Fest in October 2024, and Hellfest West in 2026. Recently they've done shows with Tokyo Rose, Audio Karate, Tigers in Cairo, and The Actual.

== Discography ==
Studio albums

- Light a Match, For I Deserve to Burn (The Militia Group, 2002)
- This Is Who You Are (The Militia Group, 2004)

The album This Is Who You Are peaked at No. 49 on the Billboard Top Heatseekers chart, and No. 22 on the Billboard Top Independent chart.

EPs

- December (Republica Records, 2001)
- The Beautiful Mistake (SideCho Records, 2002)
- The Beautiful Mistake Re-recording (2003)
- The Beautiful Mistake & Ettison Clio (Split EP) (Reignition Records, 2006)
- You're Not Broken, I Am (Wire Tap Records, 2020)
