= The Class of 98 =

American rock band

- Origin: Nashville, Tennessee
- Genres: Emo, indie rock
- Years active: 2004–2007, 2010-2014
- Label: The Militia Group

The Class of 98 (sometimes written as The Class of '98) was an American rock band from Nashville, Tennessee.

== History ==
The Class of 98 was founded by Steve Wilson in 2005, who had moved to the Nashville, Tennessee area in 1998. (The group's members did not graduate from any educational institutions in 1998.) Wilson made home demos before putting together a four-piece influenced by second-wave emo acts such as Braid and Jimmy Eat World. The group played locally in Nashville and opened for John Davis of Superdrag and The Juliana Theory over the next year. They signed with The Militia Group in 2005 and recorded their debut full-length in less than three weeks. It was released under the title Touch This and Die! in 2006, and won comparisons to Jimmy Eat World, Gin Blossoms, Third Eye Blind, and Copeland. Along with playing shows/touring with Relient K, Cartel, Jonezetta, and others, they also played both Cornerstone festivals. Songs from the album were featured on MTV, E!, and The WB television programs.

The group went on hiatus in 2007, with Wilson continuing his producing/songwriting career, Harms going on to play with The Glorious Unseen, Baumhardt with Thousand Foot Krutch, Stellar Kart, and Fireflight, and Pitts moving to Phoenix, Arizona, to pursue other ventures. The group returned in 2010 with Matt Fine, formerly of Celebrity on drums, with an EP Eye of the Needle and a full-length album Heaven in 2011.

In 2016, with all four original members residing in Nashville, Tennessee, again, the band reunited for a "10 year anniversary" show.

In 2022, Wilson and Pitts released the "Rehab EP".

== Members ==
- Steve Wilson - guitar, vocals
- Colby Pitts - drums
- Ben Harms - bass
- Nick Baumhardt - guitar
- Matt Fine - drums

== Discography ==
- Touch This and Die! (The Militia Group, 2006)
- Eye of the Needle EP (Self-released, 2010)
- Heaven (Legion of Boom, 2011)
- Rehab EP (Ghosthood Records, 2022)
