= The New Frontiers =

American rock band

- Origin: Dallas, Texas, United States
- Genres: Indie rock, alternative country
- Years active: 2006-2009
- Labels: The Militia Group
- Past members: Nathan Pettijohn; Ryan Henry; Jacob Chaney; Guy Turner; Brian Falco; Alex Bhore
- Website: myspace.com/thenewfrontiers

The New Frontiers was an American indie rock band from Dallas, Texas. Originally called Stellamaris, they released a self-titled EP in 2006, but changed their moniker after discovering that they shared a name with a long-established Israeli band. A second EP, titled Tour, followed in 2007. The band released their only studio album, titled Mending, in 2008. The New Frontiers split up in late 2008 and played their final show in January 2009. Support at this concert came from This Will Destroy You, a band who drummer Alex Bhore has since joined.

== Band members ==
- Nathan Pettijohn – vocals, guitar
- Sally Gathings - background vocals
- Ryan Henry – bass guitar
- Jacob Chaney – guitar
- Guy Turner – keyboard
- Alex Bhore – drums
- Brian Falco – guitar, keyboard

== Discography ==
=== Studio albums ===
- Mending (2008)

=== EPs ===
- Stellamaris (2006)
- Tour (2007)
