= The Push Kings =

American rock band

The Push Kings (sometimes simply Push Kings) were an American rock band from Cambridge, Massachusetts. The group released several albums of Beatles-influenced power pop in the late 1990s and early 2000s before disbanding in 2001.

== History ==
Brothers Carrick and Finn Moore Gerety founded the group in the early 1990s with David Benjamin and Matt Fishbeck; they all met as students at Harvard University. The Geretys are the sons of former Trinity College and Amherst College president Tom Gerety. They released several 45 rpm vinyl singles in the first half of the decade. While their early work was heavily indebted to indie rock musical artists such as Pavement, they began moving toward more of a power pop sound in the mid-1990s; reviewers also noted influences from 1980s-era musicians signed to Rough Trade and K Records. They signed with Massachusetts-based Sealed Fate Records, run by Eric Masunaga of the Dambuilders, and released their debut self-titled album with the label in early 1997. The New York Times wrote of the band, "the band's retro garage pop and its bowl haircuts quickly grow on you." They appeared on KCRW's Morning Becomes Eclectic later that year.

The band released four albums in five years, a pace of recording that was intentionally accelerated; the group noted that groups of the 1960s and 1970s released albums much more quickly, and believed it was unnecessary for groups to take two years or more to record and market an album, as was more common in the 1990s. Far Places, their follow-up to Push Kings, arrived in mid-1998. Switching to Rebbel Records, they released another self-titled album in 2000. Their fourth album, Feel No Fade, arrived in late 2001, and received a scathing review by Alison Fields of Pitchfork Media. By the end of 2001 the group had disbanded. Carrick Moore Gerety later went on to join Everybody Else, and Fishbeck later formed Holy Shit.

== Videogame Soundtrack ==
Some of the band's songs were involved in the in-game audio for the American and European versions of the game Road Trip Adventure, also known as Everywhere Road Trip, Choro Q HG 2, or simply Road Trip, though slight remixes of some of their songs.

== Members ==
- Carrick Moore Gerety – vocals, guitar
- Finn Moore Gerety – vocals, guitar
- David Benjamin – drums
- Matt Fishbeck – bass

== Discography ==
- Slow Down, This Is NOT Monte Carlo (Chunk Records, 1995, self published version the same year)
- Push Kings (Sealed Fate Records, 1997)
- Far Places (Sealed Fate, 1998)
- Push Kings (Rebbel, 2000)
- Feel No Fade (Le Grand Magistery, 2001)
