= Tigers (album) =

Studio album by The Dance Party
- Released: July 14, 2009
- Genre: Power pop, rock, dance-punk, new wave
- Producer: Andros Rodriguez

The Dance Party chronology
Friction! Friction! Friction! (2007)	Tigers (2009)	Touch (2010)

Tigers is a 5-song EP released by the Washington, DC rock band The Dance Party. It was initially intended to be released on July 14, 2009; however, only a limited number of EP's were pressed and were made available only at live shows due to contractual obligations with Atlantic Records.

The Dance Party announced on November 14, 2011 that a full, ten-song version of Tigers would be released on December 23, 2011.

Tigers was produced and mixed by Andros Rodriguez. Mike Tasevoli of The Hard Tomorrows played drums on the record.

== Track listing ==
No.	Title	Length
1.	"Sasha Don't Sleep"	3:25
2.	"Vampires"	3:01
3.	"Jenny, Wait!"	2:57
4.	"Lipstick"	3:45
5.	"Ultra Radical"	2:37
