= Feel No Fade =

2001 studio album by Push Kings

Studio album by Push Kings
- Released: 2001
- Length: 49:53
- Label: Le Grand Magistery

Push Kings chronology
Push Kings (2000)	Feel No Fade (2001)

Professional ratings
Review scores
Source	Rating
AllMusic	1.5/5 stars
Pitchfork	0.1/10

Feel No Fade is a studio album by American rock band Push Kings. It was released in 2001 by Le Grand Magistery. This is the only album with a score of 0.1 on Pitchfork.

== Track listing ==
Feel No Fade track listing
No.	Title	Length
1.	"Summer Trippin'"	3:46
2.	"Born Stoned"	3:51
3.	"Hands 2gether"	0:24
4.	"Rocket 'n' Ride"	3:23
5.	"I Hate Everyone but You"	4:14
6.	"Honey Come Closer"	5:11
7.	"All My Life"	4:10
8.	"Rain on Duane"	0:59
9.	"Beat Girl (and Me)"	3:14
10.	"The Minute"	3:34
11.	"Panic Button"	0:21
12.	"Hello, I Don't Even Know My Own Name"	3:54
13.	"Touching"	0:18
14.	"Shakeitup"	3:20
15.	"Party to End"	3:39
16.	"Runnin' from Something"	5:35
Total length:		49:53
