= Barcelona (indie rock band) =

American indie rock band from Seattle, Washington

- Origin: Seattle, Washington
- Genres: Indie rock, piano rock
- Instruments: guitar, piano, bass guitar, strings, drums
- Years active: 2005–present
- Label: Universal Motown (2008–2010)
- Members: Brian Fennell (vocals, piano); Branden Cate (keyboard, vocals); Rhett Stonelake (drums)
- Past members: Chris Bristol (guitar, vocals)
- Website: Official site

Barcelona is a band from Seattle, Washington. The band's sound is harmonious and piano-based with elements of rock. Formed in 2005, the band cites U2, Coldplay, Copeland, Death Cab for Cutie, and Lovedrug as its influences. Barcelona independently released their debut album, Absolutes, in September 2007. They created their own label, NBD Music, in order to be able to focus on songwriting. On December 18, 2008, the band announced that they had been signed to the major record label Universal Records. Universal Records re-mixed "Absolutes" and Barcelona added four new songs. The new version of the album was released on April 28, 2009. They parted ways with the label in early 2010.

== History ==
Two years before forming the band, Brian Fennell was involved in a solo project. He recorded Safety Songs and then employed his musically inclined friends to accompany him on a tour to support the debut album. After working with his fellow musicians, Brian came to realize that he worked better as part of a band. The friends created a music ensemble and called themselves Barcelona. Fennell described the band's sound when he stated that, "[w]e classify our music style as piano rock."

Touring began in late 2005 upon the formation of the band. Brian Fennell, Chris Bristol and Rhett Stonelake attended Seattle Pacific University, where they posed as a student club in order to get access to free rehearsal space. Bristol and Stonelake were still seniors when the band began performing gigs. Most of the band's earlier shows were on the West Coast, which has been cited as a reason for their becoming a familiar name among music listeners in the west.

The band was featured on MySpace on August 15, 2007, which caught the attention of an A&R representative who helped initiate a promotional deal with MySpace Records and MySpace.com. The band made a television appearance on Good Day Sacramento on August 8, 2007 to promote their upcoming debut album, Absolutes, and play a sample set. Barcelona released Absolutes on September 25, 2007, and it received largely favorable reviews, especially from hometown critics.

The band has played charity concerts at Pine Lake Middle School and PCMS to raise money and awareness for the school's cause of "Loose Change to Loosen Chains". The $10,000 that was generated was donated to the International Justice Mission (IJM) to help in their work of freeing the millions of modern-day slaves around the globe. On November 5, 2010, the band joined American Idol runner-up Blake Lewis, singer Claire Nordstrom, the Northwest Symphony Orchestra and several local choirs in "Primal Symphony", written and produced by Grammy Award-winning composer Mateo Messina. This annual benefit concert is put on by The Symphony Guild and supports uncompensated care at Seattle Children's Hospital.

Barcelona performed at Bumbershoot 2008 in Seattle.

On December 18, 2008 Universal Records announced that it had signed Barcelona to its label Universal Motown. The label released a remastered version of the band's original Absolutes on April 28, 2009, including four additional tracks. The re-release of Absolutes was self-produced by Barcelona and Brian Eichelberger, a close friend of the band and former member. Michael H. Brauer, a two-time Grammy winner for his work with artists such as Coldplay and John Mayer, mixed the album. The band has since parted ways with Universal Motown Records.

The song "Please Don't Go" is used in the second trailer for Water for Elephants, a film starring Robert Pattinson and Academy Award winners Reese Witherspoon and Christoph Waltz.

In December 2011, Act As If (band) released a Christmas single, "Sleighbells & Reindeer," featuring Lucy Schwartz and Brian Fennell.

The song "Slipping Away" can be heard in the third episode of the USA Network TV series, Graceland.

On November 25, 2013, the band announced three upcoming EPs, collectively called The Melodrama. The first one, Love Me became available for digital download on January 21, 2014. The lead single Background was published on November 25, 2013. The following EPs, entitled Love You and Know Love, became available on February 18 and March 18, respectively.

Prior to release of their third full-length album on October 14, 2016 entitled "Basic Man" Brian Fennell released a six-song EP, entitled "Hurt For Me" under the moniker SYML on June 28, 2016.

== Band members ==
- Brian Fennell: (vocals, piano, guitar)
- Branden Cate: (keys, vocals)
- Rhett Stonelake: (drums, vocals)
- Chris Bristol (guitar, vocals)

== Discography ==
=== Albums ===
- Safety Songs (2005) (Brian Fennell)
- Absolutes (2007) (NBD Music)
- Absolutes (2009) (Universal/Motown Records)
- Not Quite Yours (2012) (NBD Records)
- Love Me (2014)
- Love You (2014)
- Know Love (2014)
- Basic Man (2016)
