= Live Dudes =

Live album by Cartel
- Released: June 13, 2006
- Recorded: Masquerade; Atlanta, Georgia
- Genre: Pop punk
- Length: 11:47
- Label: Epic

Cartel chronology
Chroma (2005)	Live Dudes (2006)	Cartel (2007)

Live Dudes is a three song live EP by American rock band Cartel. The EP is packaged for free with the re-release of the group's 2005 debut album, Chroma, available only at independent retail stores. The re-release was the same as the original, with a full band performance of "Save Us" instead of the all piano version, and the addition of this EP, new artwork, and exclusive access to the band's online fanclub.

== Track listing ==
No.	Title	Length
1.	"Say Anything (Else)"	3:57
2.	"Honestly"	3:42
3.	"Runaway"	4:08

== Personnel ==
- Will Pugh – vocals
- Joseph Pepper – guitar
- Nic Hudson – guitar
- Ryan Roberts – bass
- Kevin Sanders – drums
- Aaron Johnson - Mixing
