= Cartel (Cartel album) =

Studio album by Cartel
- Released: August 21, 2007
- Recorded: May–June 2007
- Genre: Power pop; pop rock; pop-punk; alternative rock; indie rock
- Length: 52:55
- Label: Epic
- Producer: Zack Odom; Kenneth Mount; Wyclef Jean; Jerry "Wonda" Duplessis

Cartel chronology
Live Dudes (2006)	Cartel (2007)	Cycles (2009)

Singles from Cartel
- 1. "Lose It" Released: June 12, 2007

Cartel is the second studio album American rock band Cartel. It released in stores on August 21, 2007, despite being announced by the band's lead singer as coming out on July 24, 2007. It was officially completed at sometime around 8:00 p.m. on June 10, 2007, and features "Lose It" as the first single.

== Background ==
Prior to the release of their debut album, Cartel were attracting major label attention. In September 2005, Chroma was released through independent label The Militia Group. Within a year, the group signed to major label Epic, and their debut album had sold over 100,000 copies. Sometime in 2006, Mediaedge:cia and True Entertainment contacted Dr Pepper with the concept of placing a band inside a bubble to record an album. In January 2007, Dr Pepper approached the band asking if they would like to participate.

Around this time, a radio campaign was set up for potential second single "Say Anything (Else)". The group's label, however, said "We gotta do this (the bubble)." They went on further to explain, "If we take this momentum now and then dump a new record on top of it, we could probably blow it out." Vocalist/guitarist Will Pugh pondered "the timing [with a second single] wasn't going to work out with the bubble. ... But they screwed the pooch with that record. Like, how could we not work more than one single? This is insane."

== Music ==
The album's style is similar to its predecessor. Stylistically, it combines elements of pop-punk, alternative rock and indie rock. Alternative Press categorized the album as "scene music".

== Recording ==
On May 24, 2007, Cartel entered a giant glass bubble at Hudson River Park in New York. The bubble featured a modern recording studio, as well as a living area. On June 12, the group left the bubble and performed a 45-minute set outside it. This event, dubbed Band in a Bubble, lasted for 20 days and was filmed in its entirety. The band's progress was viewable via a four-episode series that aired on MTV, also called Band in a Bubble. The event was live streamed through a website via the use of 23 webcams. At the time, Pugh called the experience "the best thing to ever happen to us. A platform this big can show the world that real bands still exist. There's no outside producer, no hidden magic, just us writing and recording. It beats the heck out of being in college." However, he later admitted that the event was a marketing stunt.

== Release ==
On June 12, 2007, "Lose It" was released as a single. The group performed several gigs in July and August 2007, before going on tour with Nightmare of You and Weatherbox from August to October. Prior to it, Nightmare of You had to drop off the tour due to a medical emergency and were replaced by The Honorary Title. A music video was released for "Lose It" on August 9. Cartel was initially planned for release on July 24, before being released on August 21 through Epic. It was made available for streaming via PureVolume two days later. The Best Buy edition included three live-in-the-studio versions of "No Subject (Come with Me)", "This Is Who We Are" and "The Fortunate", while the iTunes version included "Get Away" as a bonus track.

== Reception ==
Professional ratings
Review scores
Source	Rating
AllMusic	3/5 stars
Entertainment Weekly	B+
Melodic	3/5 stars
Punknews.org	2.5/5 stars

The album received mixed reviews by critics.

Prior to the album's release, Epic Records' digital media marketing Vice President Doug McVehil said the label "absolutely benefited from Dr Pepper's commitment to market our band alongside their soda". Following its release, the album debuted at number 20 on the U.S. Billboard 200, selling about 28,000 copies in its first week. By October 2009 the album had sold less than 100,000 copies since its release. idobi Radio included the album on their best of 2007 list.

== Track listing ==
All lyrics written by Will Pugh, all music written by Cartel.

No.	Title	Length
1.	"The Best"	1:46
2.	"Tonight"	3:04
3.	"Lose It"	2:30
4.	"No Subject (Come with Me)"	2:33
5.	"This Is Who We Are"	3:06
6.	"I Will Hide Myself Away/I Will Follow"	6:19
7.	"Wasted"	4:23
8.	"The Fortunate"	2:53
9.	"Georgia"	3:54
10.	"If You Do, If You Don't"	3:19
11.	"Lonely One"	5:33
12.	"If I Were to Write the Song/Get Through This"	9:39
13.	"Wasted" (remix feat. Wyclef Jean)	3:49

iTunes bonus track
No.	Title	Length
14.	"Get Away"	3:50

Best Buy bonus tracks
No.	Title	Length
14.	"No Subject (Come with Me)" (live in studio)
15.	"This Is Who We Are" (live in studio)
16.	"The Fortunate" (live in studio)

== Personnel ==
Personnel per booklet.

Cartel

- Will Pugh – vocals, guitar
- Joseph Pepper – guitar
- Kevin Sanders – drums
- Nic Hudson – guitar
- Jeff Lett – bass

Additional musicians

- Platinum Horns:
  - Mike "Nyte" DeSalvo – trumpet ("Wasted" remix)
  - Dave Clauss – trombone ("Wasted" remix)
  - Adam Wheeler – saxophone ("Wasted" remix)
- Juliet Simms – guest vocals (track 3)
- Benjamin Ickies, Jr. – accordion (track 12)
- Billy Jay Stein – keyboards (track 12)
- Dennis Gruenling – additional harmonica
- The Boys & Girls Choir of Harlem Alumni Association Ensemble:
  - Tyneisha Hili, Almira Session, Keera Powell, Micheele Huart – sopranos (tracks 7 and 10)
  - Lakeith-sha Williams, Melissa Martinez, Charlene Wynn, Christina Harris, Shrod Hill – altos (tracks 7 and 10)
  - Darnel Watts, Antoine Dolberry, Jamal Womack, Ernesto Elcantara – tenors (tracks 7 and 10)
  - David Vann, Rafael Clark, Sheldon Henry – basses (tracks 7 and 10)
  - Roger Holland – arranger (tracks 7 and 10)

Additional musicians (continued)

- Drumline:
  - Bryan Kanieski, Chris Dial – quints (track 7)
  - Chris Arthurs, Corey Scienza – snare (track 7)
  - Brandon Dyer – 1st bass (track 7)
  - Kenneth Wilson – 2nd bass (track 7)
  - Andres Guerrero – 3rd bass (track 7)
  - Ryan Amos – 4th bass (track 7)
  - Caitlin White – cymbals (track 7)
  - David Wiebers – director (track 7)
  - Kevin Mavis – assistant director (track 7)
- Strings & Horns:
  - Kerren Berz – arranger, violin (tracks 7 and 10)
  - Shawn Pagliarini, Amy Chang, Rafael Veytsblum – violin (tracks 7 and 10)
  - Marylin Seelman – viola (tracks 7 and 10)
  - Annie Camp – violincello (tracks 7 and 10)
  - Jay Hanselman, Jeffrey Cook – French horn (tracks 7 and 10)
  - Lee King, Gregory Coile – trumpet (tracks 7 and 10)
  - Kedrick Merwin – trombone (tracks 7 and 10)
  - Eric Ferguson – strings and horns contractor (tracks 7 and 10)

Production

- Zack Odom, Kenneth Mount – producer, recording, mixing
- Ted Jensen – mastering
- Mack Woodward, Nuwan Piyasena, Kevin Porter – assistant engineers
- Wes Duvall, Jason Gnewikow – art direction, design
- Frank W. Ockenfells III – photography
- Wyclef Jean, Jerry "Wonda" Duplessis – producer ("Wasted" remix)
- Serge "Sergical" Tsai, Zack Odom, Kenneth Mount – recording ("Wasted" remix)
- Mike "Nyte DeSalvo, Elvis Aponte – assistant engineers ("Wasted" remix)
