= Lose It (Cartel song) =

Single by Cartel

from the album Cartel
- Released: June 12, 2007
- Recorded: 2007
- Genre: Emo, pop rock, power pop
- Label: Epic
- Producer: Zack Odom

Cartel singles chronology
"Honestly" (2006)	"Lose It" (2007)	"No Subject (Come with Me)" (2007)

"Lose It" is a single by the five-piece American pop-rock band Cartel, recorded for the MTV show Band in a Bubble. This was the first song recorded by Cartel while they spent 20 days recording a new album in a glass bubble. It was released as the group's first single from their self-titled second album Cartel, on June 12, 2007. The song featured female vocalist Juliet Simms of the band Automatic Loveletter and the ringtone reflected her portion of the song although her vocals were removed from the video.

"Lose It" was originally written as the first track for the new album and was performed live from the band's studio on June 1, 2007, for TRL's Spankin' New Music Week. The Cartel album was released on August 21, 2007. The "Lose It" single became available on iTunes and Napster on June 12, 2007, the same day Cartel was released from the bubble.

== Track listing ==
1. "Lose It" – 2:30
