= Team (American band) =

TEAM*
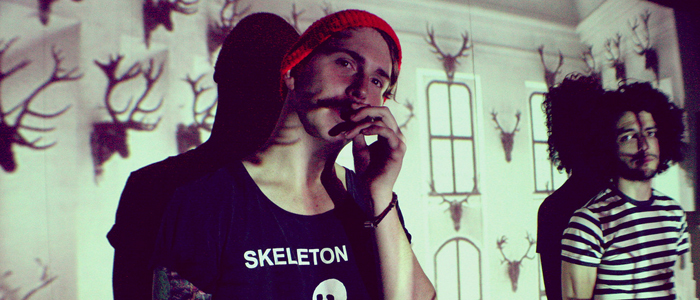
- Caleb and Rico from Dallas, TX band TEAM*

Background information
- Origin: Dallas, Texas
- Genres: Indie rock, alternative rock
- Years active: 2013–present
- Labels: Field Day Records, South By Sea
- Members: Caleb Turman, Rico Andradi
- Website: http://www.wearecalledteam.com

TEAM* is an American indie rock band from Dallas, Texas, formed by sole members Caleb Turman and Rico Andradi in May 2013. In August 2013, The band released "Am I Alive", with a line-up consisting of Caleb Turman, Rico Andradi, Bryan Donahue, and Jay Vilardi. The band has independently released a self-titled EP through Andradi's label (Field Day Records) worldwide in December 2013. In October 2014, they released their debut album, Good Morning, Bad Day, through Nashville record label South By Sea.

== History ==
=== Formation and self titled EP ===
TEAM* was formed by Caleb Turman and Rico Andradi. Caleb is a founding member, and Rico a touring member, of the band Forever the Sickest Kids. Jay Vilardi and Bryan Donahue played with Caleb and Rico on tour for the first year and contributed on the first album. In August 2013, the band released their new song, "Human War Machine". In December 2013, the band was featured as direct support on the sold out Third Eye Blind tour, and released their self-titled EP worldwide. The album was pressed on a limited edition 12" vinyl and released in 2013 via Andradi's label, Field Day Records.

=== Record label and release of Good Morning, Bad Day (2014–present) ===
In October 2014, the band re-released their debut album, Good Morning, Bad Day, through South By Sea. The album was produced by Will Pugh of the band Cartel. In support of the album, the band shared the stage with Barcelona on October 14, 2014. They released their music video in September 2014 for their single "I Like It". The band was featured as support on the Chroma Ten Year Anniversary Tour with the band Cartel. Their music video for "Just Like You (When You Turn Out The Lights)" and a live acoustic video of "Alone in My Room", were released in April 2015.

== Discography ==
- TEAM* EP (2013)
- Good Morning, Bad Day (2014)

== Band members ==
- Caleb Turman
- Rico Andradi
