= Laser Focus World =

- Discipline: Laser and photonics
- Language: English
- Edited by: Sally Cole Johnson

Publication details
- History: 1965 to present
- Publisher: Peter Fretty (US)
- Frequency: Monthly

Standard abbreviations
- ISO 4: Laser Focus World

Indexing
- ISSN: 1043-8092

Links
- Journal homepage

Laser Focus World is a monthly magazine published by Endeavor Business Media covering laser, photonics and optoelectronics technologies, applications, and markets. Many qualified professionals in those fields receive it free of charge; it is also possible to subscribe to the magazine.

== History and profile ==
Laser Focus World has been published since 1965. It is published on a monthly basis and owned by Endeavor Business Media. The headquarters of the magazine is in Nashua, New Hampshire. Approximately 80,000 qualified subscribers receive the publication and can track daily photonics news and read original features at the magazine's website. There is also an annual buyer's guide.

The magazine is the recipient of the 2011 Folio Awards.
