= The Ransom (EP) =

The Ransom EP

EP by Cartel
- Released: November 16, 2004
- Recorded: January 23–25, 2004; Glow In The Dark Studios Atlanta, Georgia
- Genre: Pop punk
- Length: 25:12
- Label: The Militia Group
- Producer: Matt Goldman, Cartel

Cartel chronology
The Ransom EP (2004)	Chroma (2005)

Professional ratings
Review scores
Source	Rating
Melodic	3.5/5 stars
Punknews.org	(original) (reissue)

The Ransom EP is the debut EP by American rock band Cartel. The recording was originally released independently, but was soon picked up by the record label, The Militia Group. They re-released the EP with two extra tracks, "The City Never Sleeps" and "Fiend".

== Track listing ==
No.	Title	Length
1.	"Luckie St."	3:43
2.	"Write This Down"	2:31
3.	"Hey, Don't Stop"	3:45
4.	"The City Never Sleeps"	3:40
5.	"Last Chance"	4:17
6.	"The Ransom"	3:28
7.	"Fiend" (Alternate Version)	3:24

== Credits ==
- Will Pugh - vocals
- Kevin Sanders - drums
- Joseph Pepper - Guitar
- Andrew Lee - Guitar
- Ryan Roberts - Bass guitar
- John Addington - Gang Vocals on Luckie St.
- Luke Bareis - Gang Vocals on Luckie St.
- Gang Vocals on Luckie St. also performed by Cartel
