= Everybody Else =

American rock band

- Origin: Silverlake, California, USA
- Genres: Power pop, Rock
- Years active: 2002–present
- Label: Garage Rock Steady Records The Militia Group
- Members: Carrick Moore Gerety; Austin James Williams III
- Past members: Mikey McCormack; Nate Beale; Kevin Seaton
- Website: http://www.everybody-else.com

Everybody Else is an American rock band from Silverlake, California.

== History ==
Everybody Else was formed by Carrick Moore Gerety and Mikey McCormack after both moved to the Los Angeles area. Both had relocated with bands, hoping to win fame on the West Coast; Moore Gerety had been in a group called Push Kings, a local band from Boston, and McCormack had been in Waking Hours. Then, Moore Gerety and McCormack began working together, adding bassist Austin Williams after he moved to the area from Fresno. They began playing as Everybody Else locally in 2002; the name is taken from a song by The Kinks, "I'm Not Like Everybody Else". They self-released a single and an EP, and signed to The Militia Group soon after. Rick Parker produced their debut self-titled album, recorded at Sandbox Recording Studios, which was released in April 2007. On March 30, 2007, they were named SPIN Band of the Day. In May 2007 the band toured with Over It, The Higher, and Self Against City. In 2008, the band played at select cities on Hanson's Walk Around the World Tour. "1½," an acoustic version of their debut album, was released on April 1, 2008 on The Militia Group.

Featured on the soundtrack of the movie Fired Up!(2009)

In 2010, the band used kickstarter to raise money for their new record.

On Dec 20, 2010, the band announced via e-mail to their subscribers that Mikey McCormack would no longer be a part of the band. Mikey had decided to go back to school and "focus all his energy on that".

Their upcoming independent album "Wanderlust" will be released digitally on June 17, 2011 and on iTunes on July 26, 2011.

== Members ==
- Carrick Moore Gerety - Guitar, Vocals
- Austin James Williams III - Bass, Vocals

== Discography ==
- Demo EP (2003)
- Everybody Else (The Militia Group, April 3, 2007)

1.Meat Market

2.Faker

3. I Gotta Run

4. In Memoriam

5. Born To Do

6.Rich Girls Poor Girls

7.Makeup

8. Without You

9. Say Goodbye

10.The Longest Hour of My Life

11.Button for Punishment

12. Alone in the World

- 1 ½ (The Militia Group, April 1, 2008)
- Gold Noise EP (The Militia Group, October 7, 2008)
- First Class EP (The Militia Group, January 20, 2010)
- Wanderlust LP (Independent, 2011)

1.Out All Night

2.Iowa Park

3.Soldiers Without An Army

4.First Class

5.Game Theory

6.Needle Deep

7.Different

8.Photograph

9.Bad Things

10.Battle Cry

11.Tomorrow We're Gone
