= Kat Corbett =

American actress

- Occupations: Disc jockey Voice artist Music supervisor
- Years active: 1993–present
- Employer(s): Sirius Radio; KROQ

Kat Corbett is an American disc jockey, voice artist, screenwriter and music supervisor. A DJ for SiriusXM since 2016, she hosts the Locals Only radio show on KROQ. She was the mid-day DJ on KROQ from 2005 to 2020.

Corbett has done voice work for clients including Mercedes-Benz and MTV. She was the Fox Sports promo voice for the FIFA World Cup from 2015 and 2019. She served as the music supervisor for the television series Sweet/Vicious in 2016 and 2017.

Corbett began her radio career as an intern at WFNX in Boston.
