= Cycles (Cartel album) =

Studio album by Cartel
- Released: October 20, 2009
- Recorded: 2009
- Genres: Emo-pop; pop; pop rock; power pop
- Length: 38:01
- Label: Wind-Up
- Producers: Cartel, Troy Johnson, Brent Paschke, Ross Petersen

Cartel chronology
Cartel (2007)	Cycles (2009)	In Stereo (2011)

Singles from Cycles
- 1. "Let's Go" Released: July 28, 2009; 2. "The Perfect Mistake" Released: March 2, 2010 (remix); 3. "Faster Ride" Released: August 2010

Cycles is the third full-length studio album by American rock band Cartel, released through Wind-up Records on October 20, 2009.

It was their second and last album to feature bassist Jeff Lett before his departure from the band in 2011.

== Background and production ==
After solid sales with their debut, Cartel's decision to record their second album on the MTV program Band in a Bubble in 2007 proved costly. Their self-titled follow up effort sold less than half the records of their debut, Chroma. Cartel was consequently released from its contract with Epic Records and left to find a new label. They were picked up courtesy of Wind-up Records president Ed Vetri, who offered the band a deal that gave Wind-up the rights to collect revenue from album sales, merchandise and touring. In July 2008, the band's signing to the label was announced.

Wind-up opted to sanction the band an extended period of time to record the album, since their previous works had been completed in less than a month. Thus, the band was in the studio for about a year. Lead singer Will Pugh praised the further time they were given, "They put us in their studio, gave us the time and allowed us to produce our own record. Listening to the record now, it's the most focused, well-organized and best representation of our band that we've had so far." Pugh claimed the band wrote 30 songs for Cycles. In January 2009, it was announced that the band were finishing the writing process and were aiming to release their next album in spring or summer. The group said they would be finished writing "in the next weeks to month... I think we've written or entertained the idea of about 30 songs at this point... it's all been in the task of getting our absolute best for you." Throughout the studio process, Cartel connected with fans by posting on Twitter, MySpace and Facebook. Through these social networking sites they have also offered giveaways and webisodes.

== Promotion and release ==
As they approached the completion of recording they did a short tour with contemporaries All Time Low and We the Kings. "Let's Go" was announced as the first single from the album, released digitally on July 28, 2009. The song impacted radio on August 18. The song's music video was premiered on Buzznet on October 13, 2009. Close to 200 fans were invited to be extras at the shoot, 80 were given hand-held video cameras to record their view of the band's performance in an abandoned warehouse. The fan-footage was then edited together along with the official footage to create the video.

A pre-order of Cycles on the iTunes Store offered a bonus track titled "In No Hurry" and the buyer received an instant download of "The Perfect Mistake". Another pre-order offer included an autographed booklet and exclusive t-shirt. A stream of Cycles was made available online on October 13, with the condition that the listener must first tweet about the album. The album's release date was originally set for October 27, but was brought forward a week to ultimately be released on October 20, 2009. The band was set to tour in support of Cycles with This Providence, The Summer Set, Bigger Lights and The Dares. An appearance on Fearless TV was also set for October 26. The album's second single, a remix of "The Perfect Mistake" by Serban Ghenea, was released to radio on March 2, 2010. The album's third single, "Faster Ride", was released to radio in August 2010. In July and August 2011, the band supported All Time Low on their North America tour.

== Reception ==
Professional ratings
Review scores
Source	Rating
AbsolutePunk	(78%)
AllMusic	2.5/5 stars
Alternative Press	3.5/5 stars
Melodic	4/5 stars

The album debuted at number 59 on the Billboard 200 chart, number 25 on the Billboard Rock Albums chart and number 17 on the Alternative Albums chart. At the end of 2009, the band was featured on the cover of the Alternative Press 2009 end of year review edition.

== Track listing ==
No.	Title	Length
1.	"Let's Go"	2:40
2.	"The Perfect Mistake"	3:25
3.	"Faster Ride"	3:29
4.	"Deep South"	4:07
5.	"Only You"	3:47
6.	"It Still Remains"	3:35
7.	"27 Steps"	3:05
8.	"See Me Now"	3:19
9.	"Typical"	3:05
10.	"Conventional Friend"	3:27
11.	"Retrograde"	4:08

iTunes Pre-order Bonus Track
No.	Title	Length
12.	"In No Hurry"	3:46
