= Acceptance (band) =

American pop punk band

Background information
- Origin: Seattle, Washington, U.S.
- Genres: Pop punk; pop rock; emo
- Years active: 1998–2006; 2015–present
- Labels: The Militia Group; Sony Music; Columbia; Rise; Tooth & Nail; Equal Vision
- Members: Jason Vena; Christian McAlhaney; Kaylan Cloyd; Ryan Zwiefelhofer; Garrett Lunceford
- Past members: Nick Radovanovic; Peter Pizzuto
- Website: acceptanceband.com

Acceptance is an American pop punk band from Seattle, Washington, formed in 1998. They released their first EP, Lost for Words, in 2000, followed by Black Lines to Battlefields in 2003 (this EP was also re-released with live bonus tracks). Their debut album, Phantoms, was released in 2005.

On January 26, 2015, it was announced that Acceptance had reunited. They released their first song in over ten years called "Take You Away" on May 8, 2015. A second studio album, titled Colliding by Design, was released in 2017, followed by Wild, Free in 2020.

== History ==
=== Early years, debut album and break-up (1998–2006) ===
The band toured nationally and shared stages with the likes of The Juliana Theory, Anberlin, Finch, Further Seems Forever, and Seether as well as performing successfully on the Warped Tour and Cornerstone Festival. When the band's debut record, Lost for Words came out on Seattle indie label, Rocketstar Records, and quickly approached the 5,000 sales mark, the industry at large began taking notice. When the band recorded a new 5-song demo with Aaron Sprinkle, this industry interest turned into serious courting by several major labels. After putting a professional management team in place to help determine the band's course of action, the band signed to Sony-owned Columbia Records, who then released the Black Lines To Battlefields EP (produced by Aaron Sprinkle) through The Militia Group who had been a long-time supporter of the band and was distributed through Sony-owned Red Distribution at the time.

Acceptance later released their debut album Phantoms on Columbia Records in 2005, again produced by Aaron Sprinkle. The album was one of many included in the Sony rootkit controversy due to its inclusion of the Extended Copy Protection software.

On August 2, 2006, the band announced they were breaking up. Former guitarist Christian McAlhaney posted the following message on their site:

You see, there comes a time in a band member's life where he must choose between the abnormal life of a gypsy rock musician and the normal life of the common man. Jason, our beloved lead singer, has chosen the latter and decided to take on the yoke of the common man. HOWEVER, the rest of us do not share in this desire for normalcy and have decided to continue in our pursuit of rock stardom. You should all be expecting to hear a new kick ace rocking project from Nick, Kyle, and I, as well as a new project from Kaylan and a bunch of secret people that I can't talk about right now.

At the time of the band's breakup, they had already written and demoed songs for a new album. As a "going away" for fans, the band posted for free download from their Myspace page the demo for the previously unreleased track "Not Afraid".

=== Post-breakup (2006–2014) ===
Jason Vena was featured on the 2010 album "Vessels" by Ivoryline on the song "The Healing", marking it his first major appearance since the breakup. In 2012, he featured on the new album Don't Panic from All Time Low on the song "Outlines".

Kaylan Cloyd has joined Ryan Van Wieringen and Bobby Darling of Gatsbys American Dream to form Search/Rescue. The band released their debut album, titled The Compound, in Japan in late 2007 with a US release in early 2008 on Eyeball Records.

Christian McAlhaney played guitar in Anberlin until November 2014, when the band disbanded (though they have since reunited, and McAlhaney continues to play with them).

Nick Radovanovic, Christian McAlhaney, and Kyle Flynn started a band called Thunder Thunder with Jerrod Bettis. Their current status is unknown due to McAlhaney's commitment with Anberlin.

Kyle Flynn currently resides in Los Angeles, CA and is working on a script with his brother Kevin Flynn for Warner Bros. Pictures. It has recently been announced that he will be touring with Anberlin.

On May 30, 2009, Nick Radovanovic posted a remixed version of the song "So Contagious" on Acceptance's Myspace page. On Wednesday, September 23, 2009 Nick posted another demo the band had written before their breakup called "Desperate" and also a blog entitled "Hey guys, Nick here" inside the blog it said:

Just wanted to say hi to everyone and to let you know im throwing up an old acceptance demo we made a while ago titled "desperate". this was during our writing sessions for which was supposed to be our newest record. most of you know we never made it that far. again, this is just a rough demo so bear with the quality. hope you guys like it. take care everyone and thanks for all this support. nickrad

=== Reunion, Colliding by Design and Wild, Free (2015–present) ===
On January 26, 2015, it was announced that Acceptance would be reuniting at Skate & Surf 2015 in Asbury Park, New Jersey. Since the announcement of their reunion, the band has released a brand new song entitled "Take You Away", making it their first single to be released since their 2006 breakup.

On August 3, 2016 Acceptance announced they would be playing three Texas dates with As Cities Burn & more on October 21 in Dallas at So What?! Music Fest in Deep Ellum, October 22 in Houston at Scout Bar, and October 23 in Austin at Dirty Dog Bar!

On November 30, 2016, Christian McAlhaney was interviewed for TheTalkhouse, where he elaborated on the band's demise in 2006. Factors contributing to Acceptance's breakup included their debut album, Phantoms, leaking 9 months early, being "strong-armed by [their] label into releasing a ballad as [Phantoms'] first single", spyware being bundled with the album (as well as other releases by Columbia Records) and a lengthy court battle that resulted in Phantoms being permanently recalled.

Acceptance have announced they are recording a second studio album, Colliding by Design, which is scheduled for a February 2017 release. A track from the album, "Diagram of a Simple Man", was released early to fans who backed the album financially via Pledge Music. On January 26, an official lyric video for the song "Haunted" was released on the Rise Records YouTube channel.

On May 17, 2019, Acceptance confirmed that they were working on and recording new material.

On June 10, 2020, Acceptance announced their new Wild EP would be released on July 24. On June 18, they released the song "Cold Air". The band released their third album, Wild, Free on October 2, which included all tracks from the Wild EP.

In the summer of 2025, Acceptance signed to Equal Vision Records.

== Musical style ==
AllMusic biographer Neil Z. Yeung described the band's sound as "catchy melodies, big choruses, and arena-sized singalongs, incorporating a harder rock edge into their sound," reminiscent of Jimmy Eat World, the Juliana Theory, and Anberlin. Phantoms has been described as pop punk fused with alternative pop, pop, pop rock, emo, and rock.

== Band members ==
Current

- Jason Vena – lead vocals (1998–2006, 2015–present), keyboards (2000–2006, 2015–present), bass (1998–2000)
- Kaylan Cloyd – lead guitar (1998–2006, 2015–present)
- Garrett Lunceford – drums, percussion (2000–2003, 2015–present)
- Christian McAlhaney – rhythm guitar, backing vocals (2000–2006, 2015–present)
- Ryan Zwiefelhofer – bass (2002–2006, 2015–present)

Former

- Nick Radovanovic – drums, percussion (2003–2006, 2015 (reunion shows))
- Peter Pizzuto – drums, percussion (1998–2000)
- Chris DeCastro – rhythm guitar, backing vocals (1998–2000)
- Christopher Camp – bass (2000–2002)

Touring

- Kyle Flynn – bass (2006), keyboards (2005–2006)

Timeline

== Discography ==
Studio albums

- Phantoms (2005)
- Colliding by Design (2017)
- Wild, Free (2020)
- Phantoms/Twenty (2025)
