= Cartel (band) =

American pop-punk band

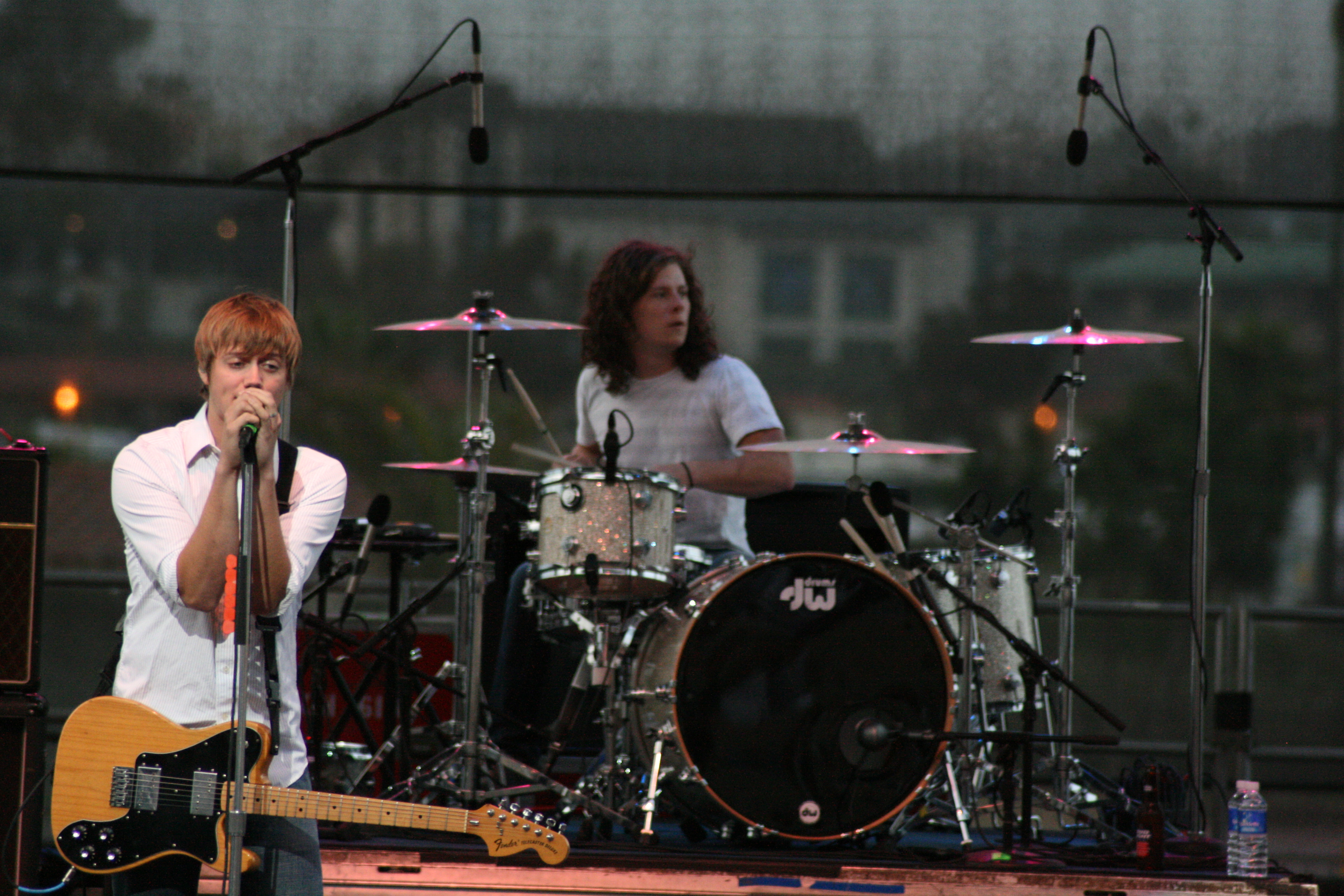
- Cartel performing in 2008 with their original lineup (shown are Kevin Sanders on drums and Will Pugh on vocals)

Background information
- Origin: Conyers, Georgia, U.S.
- Genres: Pop-punk; alternative rock
- Years active: 2003–present
- Labels: The Militia Group, Epic, Wind-Up, LAB, Field Day Records
- Members: Will Pugh; Joseph Pepper; Nic Hudson; Kyle Adams; Kevin Mahoney
- Past members: Ryan Roberts; Andy Lee; Jeff Lett; Kevin Sanders
- Website: cartelrocks.com

Cartel is an American pop punk band from Conyers, Georgia, United States, that formed in 2003. The group was featured on the MTV television series Band in a Bubble in 2007 as part of an experiment where they were given 20 days to write and record a full album. The current members of the band include vocalist Will Pugh, lead guitarist Joseph Pepper, rhythm guitarist Nic Hudson, bassist Kevin Mahoney, and drummer Kyle Adams. In April 2020, Pugh released an EP for a new side project, TAURIDS, with fellow Nashville residents Bobby Holland and Adam Bokesch—both musicians and audio producers/engineers from the band The Daybreaks.

== History ==
=== Early years and Chroma (2003–2006) ===
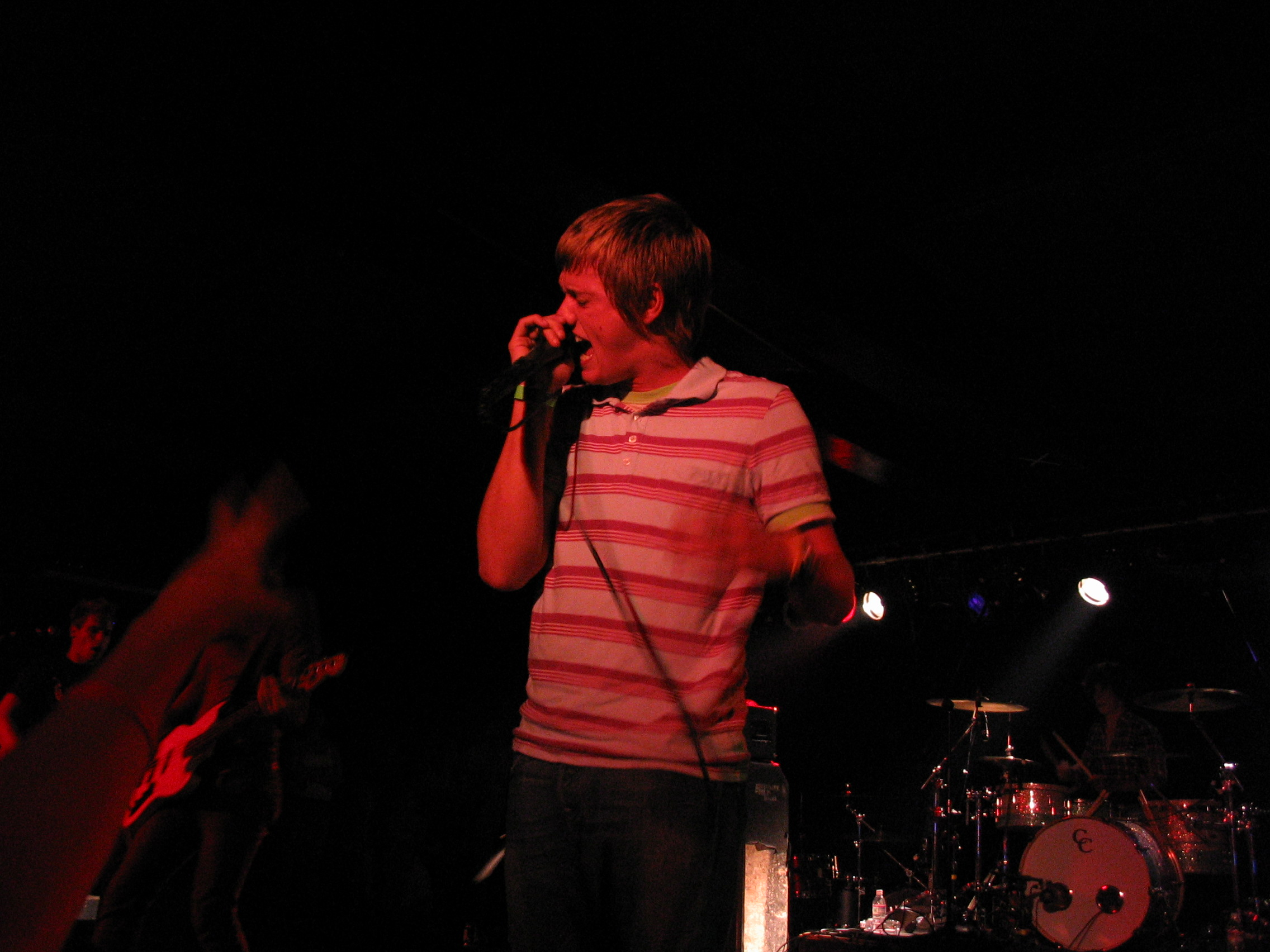
Will Pugh performing in August 2005 at The Masquerade in Atlanta.

The five band members of Cartel grew up in Rockdale County, Georgia, and Cartel was formed in late 2003 while they were attending Georgia State University. In 2003 Chris Black (aka Done To Death) started managing Cartel. The band built a strong fan base and eventually was signed to The Militia Group, an independent record company in Long Beach, California, releasing their EP The Ransom. Around this time personal differences between Andy Lee and the rest of the band came to a head; and he was replaced as guitarist by band friend Nic Hudson. With their new lineup, the band released their first full-length album, Chroma, in September 2005. The pop punk album was powered by the melodic hits of "Say Anything (Else)" and "Honestly".

The band grew in popularity putting them on Alternative Press's 2005 list for “Bands You Need to Know”. They were also named Yahoo! Music’s winner in the March 2006 "Who's Next" competition. In April 2006, Cartel signed with Epic Records, then from late 2006 until early 2007 they acted as touring support for New Found Glory with The Early November and Hit The Lights. Progressing from local shows, they kicked off a headlining tour featuring bands Cobra Starship, Boys Like Girls, Quietdrive, New Atlantic, and Permanent Me. On June 8, 2006, Ryan Roberts, the band's bass player, decided to leave the band. Cartel has noted it was an "amicable" breakup. An old friend of the band, Jeff Lett, joined as a replacement for Roberts.

The band continued, re-releasing their debut album Chroma under Epic Records. The new release is packaged with a live EP Live Dudes. After the re-release, "Say Anything (Else)" was featured in Madden 07 and their single "Honestly" became a hit when it was played on New York City's hit music station Z100. It was also featured in the 2006 film John Tucker Must Die.

=== Cartel (2007) ===
The band's second, self-titled album was recorded and produced all in an MTV experiment called Band in a Bubble that was sponsored by Dr Pepper. The band had twenty days to write and produce a full-length album while inside a bubble-shaped construction. The experiment was viewable 24/7 by fans through twenty-three webcams sponsored by Dr Pepper. The selected twenty-three cameras coincided with Dr Pepper's promotion of twenty-three flavors in its soft drink. The Band in a Bubble experiment was also a four-part mini-series on MTV. Cartel entered the bubble on May 24, 2007, and left twenty days later on June 12, 2007. Upon "breaking out" of the bubble the band put on a live concert featuring many of the new songs that had been recorded in the bubble; "Lose It", featuring Juliet Simms, was released on iTunes and Napster the same day. The complete album was released in August.

=== Cycles (2008–2010) ===
Cartel announced that they would be working on a new album during the summer of 2008. The group also announced their transition to Wind-up Records from their previous label Epic Records. The band also mentioned “I think we've written or entertained the idea of about 30 songs at this point”, The album saw the band continue their use of tight hooks and bass heavy tracks with "The Perfect Mistake", "Retrograde" and "Cycles." The band began the writing and recording stage in May 2009. On July 8, the band announced that the album would be called Cycles. The album's first single "Let's Go", was released digitally on July 28, 2009. On August 25, 2009, the band announced the track listing for the album and on September 6, "The Perfect Mistake" was released for digital download. The album's pre-order on iTunes also included a special, bonus song otherwise unavailable titled "In No Hurry.". Cycles was officially released on October 20, 2009. Their single "The Perfect Mistake" was featured in the pilot episode of The CW series Hellcats.

Following the release of Cycles, the band supported All Time Low, Boys Like Girls, Third Eye Blind, and LMFAO for part of The Bamboozle Roadshow 2010, along with numerous other supporting acts, including 3OH!3, Good Charlotte, Forever The Sickest Kids, and Simple Plan.

=== In Stereo EP and the departure of Jeff Lett (2011–2012) ===
The single off the new EP, "Lessons in Love", was released on July 26, 2011; however the single was leaked online on July 22. The rest of the five song EP was released via iTunes, on October 4, 2011, to good reviews. On April 7, 2011, Cartel confirmed that bassist Jeff Lett has left the band to finish school. The band and Lett split on good terms and have left no grievances against each other. Nic Hudson has taken over Lett's role as bassist, and singer Will Pugh is now rhythm guitarist.

The band released a deluxe version of In Stereo via LAB Records in the UK & Europe on May 20, 2012. It featured the five original songs as well as acoustic versions and one unreleased track, "No Motivation".

=== Collider and Chroma anniversary tour (2012–2022) ===
The band co-headlined a space tour in the spring. After which, singer/guitarist Will Pugh was available to produce artists/bands in the Atlanta area in the summer of 2012. On Facebook, the band also announced that they will be recording for their next, full-length album August 20, 2012. On January 20, 2013, the band announced that their new album would be titled Collider. The album was released on March 26, 2013.

From October 11, 2013, to November 30, 2013, Cartel headlined for Mayday Parade on their Glamour Kills tour along with bands Man Overboard and Stages & Stereos.

On July 24, 2014, the band tweeted that they are planning a 10-year anniversary tour for their debut album Chroma. The band was announced as one of the acts to perform in the South by So What?! festival in March at QuikTrip Park in Grand Prairie.

On February 2, 2015, the Chroma 10 Year Tour was officially announced on the band's official networks. They were joined by Hit The Lights, TEAM* and Driver Friendly on the selected dates, starting on March 20 with 24 dates in the United States, and one in London.

On April 19, 2015, the concert held on New York City for the Chroma tour was transmitted on live streaming by Yahoo! Screen, being available during the following 24 hours.

On December 21, 2015, the band released an acoustic album titled Bare Essentials, which included some of their more popular tracks, including "Honestly" and "Faster Ride".

In December 2016, the band members performed a DJ set at Emo Nite in Los Angeles.

=== Reunion and Learning How to Cope (2022-present) ===
Cartel supported Dashboard Confessional and Andrew McMahon in the Wilderness on select dates of the Hello Gone Days tour in the summer of 2022.

On July 15, 2022, the band released their first new single in nine years, "17", along with an accompanying lyric video. On August 18, 2022, they followed up with a second single, "The End".

On May 27, 2025, the band announced that they would be releasing a re-recorded version of their 2005 album Chroma on September 12, 2025, via Field Day Records. The band also announced a US headlining tour to celebrate the album's 20th anniversary beginning in September 2025. The re-recorded album will feature new guest vocals from Cassadee Pope of Hey Monday.

In an interview in June 2025, Will Pugh confirmed the band was working on a new album that would release sometime in 2026, 13 years after the release of their last full-length studio album. On January 24, 2026, the band released the song "Shirts & Skins" directly to their social media in response to the killing of Alex Pretti earlier that day. The song was part of the band's fifth studio album, and first in thirteen years, Learning How to Cope, which they released through Field Day Records on September 18, 2026.

== Musical style ==
AllMusic classes Cartel's music as emo rock and emo pop. The band's music makes strong use of melody. Their musical style is characterized by energetic arrangements and prominent melodic hooks, which established the band within the pop-punk genre, particularly following the release of their debut studio album Chroma.

== Band members ==
Current

- Will Pugh – lead vocals (2003–present), rhythm guitar (2003–2013, 2021–present only live), bass (2013–present, only studio since 2021), drums (2025–present, only studio)
- Joseph Pepper – lead guitar, backing vocals (2003–present)
- Nic Hudson – rhythm guitar (2004–2011, 2013–present), lead guitar (2004–2011, 2021–present only live), bass (2011–2013), backing vocals (2004–present)
- Kevin Mahoney – bass (2025-present)
- Kyle Adams – drums (2025–present)

Former

- Jeff Lett – bass, backing vocals (2006–2011)
- Ryan Roberts – bass (2003–2006)
- Andy Lee – rhythm and lead guitar (2003–2004)
- Kevin Sanders – drums (2003–2025)

Touring

- Alex LeCavalier – bass (2022–2025)

Timeline

== Discography ==
- Chroma (2005)
- Cartel (2007)
- Cycles (2009)
- Collider (2013)
- Learning How to Cope (2026)
