= The Militia Group =

American record label

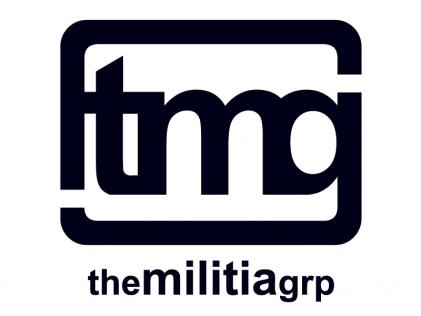
- Founded: 1998; 28 years ago
- Defunct: 2012
- Country of origin: U.S.
- Location: Long Beach, California
- Official website: themilitiagroup.com

The Militia Group is an independent record company based in Long Beach, California.

== History ==
The Militia Group was founded in 1998 by Chad Pearson as a booking agency, booking for artists such as Slick Shoes, Craig's Brother, Dogwood, twothirtyeight, Acceptance, and Element 101. Pearson and Rory Felton partnered in 2000 to turn the booking agency into a record company. Both Pearson and Felton had previous experience with independent labels and artists: Pearson in Seattle, WA working at Tooth & Nail Records, and Felton in Kansas City co-operating Arise Records with Jason Irvine in Louisville, KY. Arise published The Juliana Theory's first CD, a split album with Dawson High; and other bands: Tijuana Crime Scene, The National Acrobat, Reflector and Recess Theory. In 2000, Pearson teamed up with Felton to turn the agency into an independent record label based out of Huntington Beach, CA. By January 2001, the label had signed Rufio, The Lyndsay Diaries, Tora! Tora! Torrance!, Veronica, and Noise Ratchet. Within the next year Copeland, The Rocket Summer, The Beautiful Mistake, and Acceptance joined the fold.

By 2002, the label had sold its first 100,000 albums with its first release: Rufio's Perhaps, I Suppose..., and was operating out of offices in Anaheim, CA. By 2004, as the label moved operations from Anaheim, CA to Garden Grove, CA. In early 2007, Pearson left TMG to start a company called P Is for Panda. 2007 saw albums released by Denison Witmer, The New Frontiers, Chase Pagan, and We Shot The Moon. By 2008, the label had sold over 1,400,000 albums.

The label may be best known for developing the artist Cartel, for whom The Militia Group released The Ransom EP and Chroma. The 'Chroma' title has sold over 1,030,000 singles, 255,000 albums (according to Soundscan) and was acquired by Sony Music's Epic Records.

The Militia Group stopped releasing new music in 2012, though its back catalogue is still in print.

== Distribution ==
Distribution is handled on a territory by territory basis by:

United States: The Orchard

== Roster ==
=== Current artists ===
- Backseat Goodbye
- Chase Pagan
- Denison Witmer
- Driving East
- Jill Cunniff
- Jonathan Jones
- Lakes
- Let Go
- Mercy Mercedes
- Mobile
- One for the Team
- The Panic Division
- Sights and Sounds
- Tahiti 80
- The Urgency

=== Former artists ===
- Acceptance (Active, currently on Equal Vision Records)
- The Appleseed Cast (active, currently on Graveface Records)
- Anadivine
- The Beautiful Mistake (Active, currently on Wiretap Records)
- Big Collapse
- Blueprint Car Crash
- Brandtson (Disbanded 2008)
- Cartel (Active, currently on Field Day Records)
- The Class of 98 (Active, currently without a label)
- Controlling the Famous (Disbanded 2007)
- Copeland (Active, currently on Tooth & Nail Records)
- Everybody Else
- Fielding
- The Jealous Sound (Disbanded 2017)
- Juliette and the Licks (Disbanded 2009)
- The Holy Fire (Active)
- The Lyndsay Diaries
- Lovedrug
- Man Alive (Active, currently on B& Recordings)
- Noise Ratchet
- The New Frontiers (Inactive)
- Quietdrive
- The Rocket Summer (Active, currently with Aviate Records)
- Reeve Oliver (Active, currently on Apple Danish Records)
- Ronnie Day (Active, currently on Simplify Music)
- Rufio
- The Summer Set (Active, currently on Fearless Records)
- Tora! Tora! Torrance!
- Umbrellas (Active, currently without a label)
- Veronica
- We Shot the Moon (Active, currently on Afternoon Records)
