= Lydia discography =

- Studio albums: 5
- Extended plays: 3
- Singles: 3
- Video albums: 1
- Music videos: 5
- Demos: 2

The discography of Lydia, a Gilbert, AZ based indie rock band, consists of five studio albums, three EPs, three singles, and five music videos.

== Studio albums ==
Year	Information
2005	This December; It's One More and I'm Free: Released: September 27, 2005; Label: HourZero Records
2008	Illuminate: Released: March 18, 2008, October 21, 2008 (Rerelease); Label: Linc Star Records, Low Altitude Records
2011	Paint It Golden: Released: October 4, 2011; Label: Self released
2013	Devil: Released: March 19, 2013; Label: Self released
2015	Run Wild: Released: September 18, 2015; Label: Self released
2018	Liquor: Released: July 13, 2018; Label: Weekday Records/Sony Music Entertainment
2020	I Was Someone Else: Released: November 20, 2020; Label: Weekday Records/Sony Music Entertainment
2025	Illuminate (She Saved Me): Released: June 27, 2025; Label: Near Mint

== Extended plays ==
Year	Information
2009	Hotel Sessions: Released: October 12, 2009; Label: Self released
2010	Assailants: Released: July 20, 2010; Label: Self released
2012	Acoustics: Released: November 15, 2012; Label: Self released

== Singles ==
Year	Song
2008	"I Woke Up Near the Sea"
2011	"Have Yourself A Merry Little Christmas"
2013	"Knee Deep"

== Music videos ==
Year	Song
2009	"I Woke Up Near the Sea"
2010	"I've Never Seen a Witch"
2011	"Dragging Your Feet in the Mud"
2012	"Best Nights"
2013	"The Exit"

== Other appearances ==
Song	Date of Release	Info
"Smile, You've Won" (Demo)	2005	Atticus: ...dragging the lake, Vol. 3 Compilation
"Your Taste Is My Attention"	2007	The Bamboozle 2007: Everything Will Be Much Better Once I Get These Clowns Out of My Head Compilation
"With A Little Help From My Friends"	2012	The Beatles cover with The Maine and Arkells. Released on Spotify
Live versions of "Best Nights" and "All I See"	2012	The Pioneer North American Tour (Live EP)

== Demos ==
Four Song Demo

1. "Her and Haley" - 7:38
2. "A Story for Supper" - 6:30
3. "Only Something You Could Say" - 2:15
4. "Such a Beautiful Dream" - 4:48^{1}

^1Re-recorded as "Fools and Luxury"

The Militia Group Demos

1. "One" - 3:10
2. "Two" - 4:12
