= Likeness =

Likeness may refer to:

- The Likeness, a 2008 mystery novel by Tana French
- Image of God
- Likeness, a short film by Rodrigo Prieto starring Elle Fanning

== People with the surname ==
- James Likeness, American graphic designer and musician from Hawaii

== See also ==
- Homoiōma
- Simulacrum
- Likeness rights or personality rights
