= Talking in Your Sleep (The Cinema album) =

Talking In Your Sleep

Studio album by The Cinema
- Released: December 16, 2014
- Recorded: Marigolds + Monsters Studio
- Genre: Indie pop
- Length: 35:30
- Label: 81 Twenty Three
- Producer: Matt Malpass

The Cinema studio album chronology
My Blood Is Full of Airplanes (2011)	Talking In Your Sleep (2014)

Singles from Talking In Your Sleep
- 1. "Call It In the Air" Released: October 30, 2014; 2. "Ghost" Released: December 4, 2014; 3. "Turn It On (feat. Aaron Marsh)" Released: March 23, 2015

Talking In Your Sleep is the second album by American indie pop band, The Cinema. Released on December 16, 2014, the album was available for purchase on CD, vinyl, and digital download platforms.

The Cinema posted the official track listing for the new album on October 23, 2014 on band's Twitter page. On October 30, 2014, The Cinema released its first single titled "Call It In the Air" exclusively through AbsolutePunk. The new album was available for pre-order through iTunes and the 8123 official website the following day.

The Cinema released a lyric video for its second single, "Ghost", on December 4, 2014. On March 23, 2015, the band released a music video for its third single from the album, "Turn It On" (feat. Aaron Marsh of Copeland).

== Reception ==
Professional ratings
Review scores
Source	Rating
AbsolutePunk	7/10 stars
Sputnikmusic	2/5 stars
Under the Gun	8/10 stars

"Talking Is Your Sleep" has received generally positive reviews from music critics. Matt Pana from Vents Magazine stated: "What I love most about 'Talking In Your Sleep' is the hypnotic electronic bass line, alongside piano with a simple touch. As the song continues, you can feel a sense of desperation in chorus which captures the overall mood of the song. All in all, The Cinema is at it again with catchy hook evoking that reckless youth previously mentioned."

Ryan Gardner of AbsolutePunk awarded the album 7/10 stars and stated: "The fun thing about The Cinema is how evident it is that Antelman and Malpass have so much fun doing it. As mentioned are songs in all areas of the spectrum here – the more mellow “Turn It On,” the hook driven “Ghost,” and the most flamboyant pop song with “Weekend.” Even the three part vocal melody on “Punchline” is something I haven’t really heard before. The album feels similar to My Blood Is Full of Airplane but also throws some unexpected segments – the guitar part near the end of “Talking In Your Sleep” – that break from the norm. The experimentation does have some missteps, but there’s still a little something here for everyone – fans of The Cinema’s previous record, Lydia’s Devil, synth-heavy music, and pop music."

== Track listing ==
No.	Title	Length
1.	"Call It In the Air"	3:45
2.	"Turn It On (feat. Aaron Marsh)"	3:44
3.	"Crazy"	3:30
4.	"She Knows"	3:25
5.	"Ghost"	3:42
6.	"Punchline (feat. Mindy White)"	3:51
7.	"Talking In Your Sleep"	3:25
8.	"Dancing Round Me"	3:31
9.	"Weekend"	3:13
10.	"Going Down"	3:28

== Personnel ==
- Leighton Antelman – vocals
- Matt Malpass – programming, production
