= The Cinema =

- Members Leighton Antelman, left, and Matt Malpass, right.

Background information
- Origin: Tempe, Arizona / Atlanta, Georgia
- Genre: Indie pop
- Years active: 2011–present
- Label: Independent
- Members: Leighton Antelman; Matt Malpass
- Website: www.facebook.com/thecinemamusic

The Cinema is an American indie pop band from Tempe, Arizona and Atlanta, Georgia. Members of the band include Lydia vocalist, Leighton Antelman, and producer and songwriter, Matt Malpass. The Cinema released its debut album titled My Blood Is Full of Airplanes on September 13, 2011. The band's second full-length album, Talking In Your Sleep, was released on December 16, 2014.

== History ==
On May 17, 2011, The Cinema announced the release of its first single, "Kill It". In addition to the new track, the band also released an introduction video via their YouTube page. On May 20, 2011, The Cinema posted a clip of their second single, "The Wolf", on their Facebook page. They also announced plans to release a full version of the track on Tuesday, May 22, 2011. On May 25, 2011, AbsolutePunk reported that both singles were available for purchase through the iTunes store. On May 31, 2011, The Cinema released its third single titled "Say It Like You Mean It", and the track was available for download on iTunes the same day. The band released its fourth and final single titled "Picasso" on July 28, 2011 .

On August 25, 2011, The Cinema announced that the band's debut album, My Blood Is Full of Airplanes would be released on September 13, 2011.

The Cinema released the official track listing for their debut album on September 11, 2011. The album was well received by music critics. Under the Gun Review awarded the album 9/10 stars, and stated it was "one of the most notable releases of the past year". In addition, Alter the Press gave the album a score of 4/5.

On October 30, 2014, the band released a new single titled "Call It In the Air" exclusively through AbsolutePunk. In addition, The Cinema announced that their second album, titled Talking In Your Sleep, will be released on December 16, 2014. Mindy White, current vocalist for States and former member of Lydia, and Aaron Marsh of Copeland were both featured on the album. Pre-orders were made available through the 8123 official website. On November 5, 2014, the band released the official track listing for the 10-track upcoming album. They also released an album teaser on YouTube.

The Cinema released a lyric video for its second single, "Ghost", on December 4, 2014.

On March 23, 2015, the band released a music video for "Turn It On".

== Discography ==
Studio albums

- My Blood Is Full of Airplanes (2011)
- Talking In Your Sleep (2014)
