= Chin Up =

A chin-up is an upper-body strength exercise.

Chin Up may refer to:

== Film and television ==
- Haut les cœurs! or Chin Up!, a 1999 French-Belgian film
- "Chin Up!", a 2001 episode of The Fairly OddParents
- "Chin Up", a 2018 episode of Ink Master
- Chin Up, a 2019 short film which won the P. K. Walker Innovation in Craft award at the Superfest International Disability Film Festival

== Literature ==
- Chins Up, a 1939 book by Mildred Seydell

== Music ==
=== Albums ===
- Chin Up, a 2007 album by Chinawut Indracusin
- Chin Up!, a 2023 album by Eason Chan

=== Bands ===
- Switchfoot, an American band founded in 1996 under the name Chin Up

=== Songs ===
- "Chin Up", from the 1973 Hanna Barbera animated musical film Charlotte's Web
- "Chin Up", from the 1985 Elvis Brothers album Adventure Time
- "Chin Up", from the 2003 Catch 22 album Dinosaur Sounds
- "Chin Up", from the 2005 Snowden EP Snowden
- "Chin Up", from the 2007 Copeland album Dressed Up & in Line
- "Chin Up", from the 2007 Will Bernard album Party Hats
- "Chin Up", a 2009 song by Heartbreak Club
- "Chin Up", from the 2010 Former Ghosts album New Love
- "Chin Up", from the 2012 DJ Paul album A Person of Interest
- "Chin Up", from the 2012 Moose Blood album I'll Keep You in Mind, From Time to Time
- "Chin Up", from the 2012 Waka Flocka Flame album Triple F Life: Friends, Fans & Family
- "Chin Ups", from the 2016 Bear Hands album You'll Pay for This
- "Chin Up", a 2019 single by Yoke Lore
- "Chin Up", a 2023 song by Pixxie
- "Chin Up", from the 2025 Sam Fender album People Watching

== Others ==
- Chin up, military posture that is part of standing at attention

== See also ==
- Chin Up Chin Up, an American band formed in 2001
- Chinnup, or shinty, a Scottish sport played with a ball and stick
