= Hotel Sessions =

Hotel Sessions may refer to:

- Hotel Sessions (Lydia EP)
- Hotel Sessions (Olivia Newton-John EP)
