= Run Wild (Lydia album) =

Studio album by Lydia
- Released: September 18, 2015
- Recorded: 2015
- Genre: Indie rock, indie pop
- Length: 35:50
- Label: Self released
- Producer: Colby Wedgeworth; Aaron Marsh

Lydia chronology
Devil (2013)	Run Wild (2015)	Liquor (2018)

Singles from Run Wild
- 1. "Past Life" Released: August 7, 2015; 2. "Late Nights" Released: August 21, 2015; 3. "When It Gets Dark Out" Released: November 5, 2015

Run Wild is the fifth album by Lydia.

== History ==
On August 7, 2015, Lydia announced the release date, cover art, and first single from Run Wild, their fifth LP. The first single is titled "Past Life", and was made available for streaming through the band's SoundCloud account. Pre-orders for the album were made available in various formats including vinyl and CD. Leighton Antelman stated in an article featured on Alternative Press that the album would be "a little darker" than their last release, 2013's Devil. Run Wild coincided with a 30-date tour alongside Turnover and Seahaven. For Run Wild, the band worked with two producers—Colby Wedgeworth and Copeland's Aaron Marsh—and vocalist Leighton Antelman explained via press release, "This was the first time for us using two producers. We simply felt like the more the merrier. When ideas start pouring out and bouncing around the room something special happens there."

On August 21, 2015, the band released the album's second single, titled "Late Nights" through their website. The track was made available for streaming and free download.

Lydia released a music video for the album's third single, "When It Gets Dark Out", on November 5, 2015.

== Track listing ==
No.	Title	Length
1.	"When It Gets Dark Out"	3:02
2.	"Riverman"	4:01
3.	"Late Nights"	3:25
4.	"Paint My Mind"	3:17
5.	"The Sounds in Your Dream"	3:24
6.	"Past Life"	3:13
7.	"Paper Love"	2:57
8.	"Coffee Drips"	2:39
9.	"Watching the Lights"	3:27
10.	"Follow Me Down"	3:38
11.	"Georgia"	2:47
Total length:		35:50

== Charts ==
Chart (2015)	Peak position
US Heatseekers Albums (Billboard)	14
