= Sleep Talking =

Sleep Talking may refer to:

- Sleep talking or somniloquy
- Sleep Talking (EP), a 2013 EP by Nu'est
- "Sleep Talking", a song by Level 42 from the 2006 album Retroglide
- "Sleep Talking", a jazz composition by Ornette Coleman from the album Sound Grammar
- "Sleep Talking", a song by American pop singer Charlotte Lawrence
- "Sleep Talking", a song by Takanashi Kiara from the album Point of View

== See also ==
- Talking in Your Sleep (disambiguation)
