= You Are My Sunshine (Copeland album) =

Studio album by Copeland
- Released: October 14, 2008
- Length: 48:08
- Label: Tooth & Nail
- Producers: Aaron Sprinkle, Aaron Marsh

Copeland chronology
Dressed Up & In Line (2007)	You Are My Sunshine (2008)	Ixora (2014)

Professional ratings
Review scores
Source	Rating
AbsolutePunk.net	(92%)
AllMusic	3.5/5 stars
Paste	(63/100)

You Are My Sunshine is Florida-based indie rock band Copeland's fourth full-length album. It was released on October 14, 2008. The album marks Copeland's first release on the record label, Tooth & Nail Records. A vinyl version was released on January 27, 2009, followed by a re-release on August 26, 2014.

All tracks are written by Aaron Marsh.

No.	Title	Length
1.	"Should You Return"	4:06
2.	"The Grey Man"	4:15
3.	"Chin Up"	3:19
4.	"Good Morning Fire Eater"	4:08
5.	"To Be Happy Now"	3:12
6.	"The Day I Lost My Voice (The Suitcase Song)"	4:40
7.	"On the Safest Ledge"	4:19
8.	"Not Allowed"	3:05
9.	"Strange and Unprepared"	2:50
10.	"What Do I Know?"	3:43
11.	"Not So Tough Found Out"	10:29

LP version bonus tracks
No.	Title	Length
12.	"What Cannot Be Found (Part 1)"	2:07
13.	"Every Silence"	4:02
14.	"You Are My Sunshine"	3:18

The bonus tracks were also made available on the standalone The Grey Man EP, release in 2009.

== Credits ==
- Aaron Marsh - vocals, guitar, bass, keyboard, piano, producer, horn and strings arrangements
- Bryan Laurenson - guitar
- Jonathan Bucklew - drums, percussion
- Aaron Sprinkle – producer
- Michael Brauer – mixing, at Quad Studio, New York
- Rae Cassidy Klagstad - guest vocals on "Not So Tough Found Out", "On the Safest Ledge", and "The Day I Lost My Voice (The Suitcase Song)"
- Cakeface - programming
- Dan Bachelor - clarinet
- Jacob Kauffmann - bassoon
- Robert Parker - trumpet, flugelhorn
- Chris Carmichael - violin, viola, cello
- Troy Glessner Mastering S.P.E.C.T.R.E. MASTERING

== Music videos ==
- "The Grey Man"
- "Not So Tough Found Out"
- "Strange and Unprepared"
- "Should You Return"
- "Chin Up"
- "Good Morning Fire Eater"
- "Not Allowed"
- "To Be Happy Now"
- "On the Safest Ledge"
