= Mindy White =

- Born: June 19, 1989 (age 36); Houston, Texas, U.S.
- Genres: Indie rock
- Occupations: Musician, songwriter
- Instruments: Vocals, keyboard
- Years active: 2006–present
- Labels: Low Altitude Records, Tooth & Nail
- Formerly of: Lydia, States

Mindy White (born June 19, 1989) is an American singer-songwriter and musician from Nashville, Tennessee. She is recognized for her distinctive and captivating vocals, songwriting abilities, musical versatility, and continual reinvention of her sound. She is a former member of Arizona-based indie rock band Lydia and later lead vocalist of indie rock band States. White has since then went on to release her own solo pop music, which is inspired by her love of 60s-70s classics and 90s-00s pop.

== Early life ==
Mindy was born in Houston, Texas, and grew up as an only child. Her family later moved to Nashville, Tennessee when Mindy was 5 years old, as her parents wanted to pursue music themselves. Her family's love of music is said to have inspired hers, especially her love of classic rock, pop, and country music.

Mindy fell in love with the local Nashville music scene as a teenager, and says she really found herself within the "emo" music scene. She said that if it hadn't been for bands like The Used, My Chemical Romance, and Circa Survive, and being able to relate how she's feeling through their songs and lyrics, she doesn't know if she would be here today. She said the first time she went to Warped Tour made her realize how badly she was dying to do what the artists on that tour were doing. She started seriously pursuing music around then, writing songs on piano and guitar, and teaching herself how to use GarageBand. She also let it be known that she was more than open to also joining a band and touring on the road. Mindy released a few self-produced and released demos, which are only available on Youtube. Mindy eventually joined the indie rock band Lydia right after graduating high school, beginning her professional music career.

== Career ==
In early 2006, she joined Gilbert, Arizona-based indie rock group Lydia, headed by Leighton Antelman, on vocals and keyboard. Lydia released one studio album with White, titled Illuminate, on March 18, 2008. Mindy toured with Lydia for the next few years, playing shows all over North America.

In 2009, Mindy left Lydia to start her own musical project, States, with members of Florida-based alternative band Copeland, including Bryan Laurenson (guitar), Jonathan Bucklew (drums), Dean Lorenz (bass), and Stephen Laurenson (guitar). Together, they recorded an EP called Line 'Em Up which came out on October 12, 2010. They then released their full-length studio album, Room to Run, on October 18, 2011, and later re-released it (with the addition of two demos, acoustic versions of two songs from their EP, a remix, and two brand new songs) on June 19, 2012, via Tooth & Nail Records, followed by Paradigm on December 3, 2013, released independently with the help of a successful Kickstarter campaign. In 2017, Mindy released her first ever dreamy-pop solo single, "Lifted". It was followed by a fresh, heartfelt, beat-driven ballad, "Lost You in the Summer" in 2018, and later, her super-fun, electro-pop son "Nothing New", in 2019. As of 2020, she's continued to release even more captivating, emotional pop songs, some even seeming to explore her Nashville roots, such as the beautiful and fittingly haunting ballad, "Ghost", and her 1970s-inspired, perfectly harmonized, listen-on-repeat-worthy track, "Somewhere".

Mindy has toured with bands such as Circa Survive, The Starting Line, Set Your Goals, Lights, Copeland, Metro Station, Paramore and others.

Aside from her work with Lydia and States, White has collaborated with Anthony Green of Circa Survive on a holiday cover of the song Baby, It's Cold Outside in 2010 and artist BLACKBEAR on his song "End Up" in 2012. Mindy also collaborated with artist TELLE of rock band The Word Alive, lending her guest vocals in 2021 to his song, "Letting Go".

Mindy is married to Forever the Sickest Kids drummer Kyle Burns.

Mindy is vegan and an avid supporter of animal rights. Mindy supports the ASPCA, WWF, and The Humane Society of the United States. She is also a big supporter of and advocates for human rights, women's rights, children's safety and education, amplifying the voices and protections of Indigenous people and POC, LGBTQ rights, humane conservation, and environmental protections.

In mid-2014, Mindy had to step back from touring and music completely due to mystery severe illness, which later turned out to be Chronic Lyme Disease from a tick bite she got in Nashville, TN. She spent the next few years quietly fighting the illness, among several others which had developed due to the Lyme Disease being untreated for so long. Because of controversy surrounding the disease, Mindy didn't receive a proper diagnosis and treatment until five years later, and she still struggles with many of the physical and mental symptoms today. She advocates for Lyme Disease awareness and support, along with Dysautonomia awareness and support, and the importance of mental health, therapy, and self care.

== Discography ==
=== With Lydia ===
- Illuminate (March 18, 2008, Low Altitude Records)

=== With States ===
- Room to Run (2011, Self-Released, Tooth & Nail)
- Room to Run (Re-Released, June 19, 2012, Tooth & Nail)
- Paradigm (December 3, 2013, self-released)

=== Solo Music ===
- Lifted (2017, Self-Released)
- Lost You in the Summer (2018, Self-Released)
- Nothing New (2019, Self-Released)
- Ghost (2022, Self-Released)
- Somewhere (2023, Self-Released)
