= Blushing (album) =

Studio album by Copeland
- Released: February 14, 2019
- Recorded: 2016–2018
- Studio: The Vanguard Room, Lakeland, Florida
- Length: 48:15
- Label: Tooth & Nail
- Producer: Copeland

Copeland chronology
Ixora (2014)	Blushing (2019)

Singles from Blushing
- 1. "Pope" Released: November 1, 2018; 2. "Night Figures/On Your Worst Day" Released: December 6, 2018; 3. "Lay Here" Released: January 20, 2019

Blushing is the sixth studio album by American band Copeland. It was released on Valentine's Day 2019 via Tooth & Nail Records. It is the band's follow-up to their 2014 album Ixora, as well as their second album released since their reunion.

== Background ==
After the band finished touring in support of Ixora, Copeland began working on Blushing in 2016. Once again, recording took place at Aaron Marsh's studio, The Vanguard Room, in Lakeland. Marsh himself would also serve as the album's chief producer and engineer, as he did on Ixora. The album features contributions from singer-songwriter Young Summer, as well as a track featuring Ski Beatz and The 83rd.

The album's first single was "Pope", which was released on November 1, 2018. A lyric video for the song was released a week later. The album itself was announced via a Billboard premiere of the next single, "Night Figures", on December 6. Another new song, "On Your Worst Day", was released simultaneously. This was followed a month later by the release of the third single, "Lay Here".

== Track listing ==
No.	Title	Length
1.	"Pope"	4:55
2.	"Lay Here"	4:13
3.	"As Above, So Alone"	5:33
4.	"Suddenly"	4:06
5.	"Night Figures"	4:06
6.	"Skywriter (featuring Young Summer)"	4:14
7.	"Colorless"	4:39
8.	"On Your Worst Day"	5:51
9.	"Strange Flower"	4:35
10.	"It Felt So Real"	1:25
11.	"Waltz on Water"	4:32
Total length:		48:15

== Personnel ==
As adapted from Discogs.

Copeland

- Aaron Marsh – lead vocals, backing vocals, piano (all tracks except "It Felt So Real"), synthesizer, programming (all tracks except "Suddenly"), Mellotron ("Suddenly", "Colorless"), guitar ("As Above, So Alone", "Colorless", "Strange Flower"), bass guitar (all tracks except "On Your Worst Day" and "It Felt So Real"), trombone ("Suddenly", "Colorless"), drums ("Night Figures"), percussion ("Suddenly", "Skywriter", "Colorless", "Strange Flower", "Waltz on Water")
- Bryan Laurenson – guitar (all tracks except "On Your Worst Day" and "It Felt So Real")
- Stephen Laurenson – guitar ("Pope", "As Above, So Alone", "Night Figures", "Colorless"), synthesizer (all tracks except "Skywriter" and "Strange Flower"), keyboards ("Skywriter", "Strange Flower"), programming ("Night Figures", "Skywriter", "Colorless", "Strange Flower", "Waltz on Water"), piano ("Waltz on Water")

Additional personnel (in order of appearance)

- Young Summer – vocals ("Pope", "Skywriter", "It Felt So Real")
- Stephanie Brooks – viola ("Pope", "Skywriter", "On Your Worst Day", "Strange Flower", "Waltz on Water")
- Rachel Plating – violin ("Pope", "Skywriter", "On Your Worst Day", "Strange Flower", "Waltz on Water")
- Jonathan Bucklew – drums ("Pope", "Strange Flower")
- Jordan Butcher – drums ("Lay Here", "As Above, So Alone", "Colorless", "Strange Flower", "Waltz on Water")
- Stephen Nichols – bass, piano ("As Above, So Alone")
- Ski Beatz – programming, synthesizer ("Suddenly")
- The 83rd – bass, synthesizer ("Suddenly")
- Joshua Dampier – violin, viola ("Night Figures")

Production

- Aaron Marsh – producer, engineer
- Bryan Laurenson – producer
- Stephen Laurenson – producer
- Michael Brauer – mixing
- Troy Glessner – mastering
- Levi Seitz – vinyl mastering
- Fernando Reyes – mixing assistant, engineer
- Ski Beatz – additional production ("Suddenly")
- The 83rd – additional production ("Suddenly")
- Zachary Gray – photography
