= Maybe This Christmas Tree =

Compilation album by various artists
- Released: October 5, 2004
- Genre: Holiday, pop rock
- Length: 44:21
- Label: Nettwerk Records
- Producer: Monica Seide

Maybe This Christmas chronology
Maybe This Christmas Too? (2003)	Maybe This Christmas Tree (2004)

Maybe This Christmas Tree is a holiday compilation album released in October 2004 through Nettwerk Records featuring contemporary musicians performing both classic and original Christmas songs.

== Reception ==
Professional ratings
Review scores
Source	Rating
Allmusic	4/5 stars

Allmusic's MacKenzie Wilson awarded the compilation four out of five stars and called it Nettwerk's "finest yuletide compilation yet".

== Track listing ==
No.	Title	Writer(s)	Performed By	Length
1.	"Happy Christmas (War Is Over)"	John Lennon, Yoko Ono	The Polyphonic Spree	4:18
2.	"The Christmas Song"	Sune Rose Wagner	The Raveonettes	2:15
3.	"Christmas (Baby Please Come Home)"	Jeff Barry, Ellie Greenwich, Phil Spector	Death Cab for Cutie	3:05
4.	"I Heard the Bells on Christmas Day"	Henry Wadsworth Longfellow, John Baptiste Calkin	Pedro the Lion	4:40
5.	"Bittersweet Eve"	Brett Detar, Chris Evenson	Belasana	4:51
6.	"Christmas Time Is Here"	Vince Guaraldi, Lee Mendelson	Ivy	2:56
7.	"Baby It's Cold Outside"	Frank Loesser	Royal Crown Revue and Vicky Tafoya	3:25
8.	"Wonderful Christmastime"	Paul McCartney	Tom McRae	4:10
9.	"Fairytale of New York"	Jem Finer, Shane MacGowan	Pilate	4:56
10.	"Jingle Bells"	James Lord Pierpont	Lisa Loeb	3:21
11.	"Christmas for Cowboys"	Steve Weisberg	Jars of Clay	2:52
12.	"Do You Hear What I Hear?"	Noël Regney, Gloria Shayne	Copeland	3:32
Total length:				44:21

Track listing adapted from Allmusic.

== Personnel ==
- Ralph Alfonso – typography
- Jeff Barry – composer
- Dave Bassett – arranger, engineer, mixing, producer
- Belasana – primary artist
- João Carvalho – producer
- Andy Chase – mixing, producer
- Jon Chiccarelli – engineer
- Copeland – primary artist
- Mitch Dane – engineer, mixing
- Mel Davis – violin
- Death Cab for Cutie – primary artist
- Brett Detar – composer, engineer, producer
- Dominique Durand – vocals
- Chris Evenson – composer, engineer, mixing, producer
- Eric Drew Feldman – producer
- Jem Finer – composer
- Brian Friedman – engineer, mixing
- Richard Gottehrer – producer
- James Gray – accordion
- Ellie Greenwich – composer
- Vince Guaraldi – composer
- Ivy – primary artist
- Jars of Clay – primary artist, producer
- Sarah Kishivevsky – violin
- Bryan Laurenson – mixing, producer
- John Lennon – composer
- Jeffrey Lesser – mixing
- Lindi – vocal arrangement
- Lisa Loeb – primary artist, producer
- Frank Loesser – composer
- Zé Luis – conductor, producer, string arrangements
- Shane MacGowan – composer
- Aaron Marsh – producer
- Paul McCartney – composer
- Tom McRae – primary artist, producer
- Yoko Ono – composer
- Pedro the Lion – arranger, primary artist, producer
- Pilate – primary artist
- The Polyphonic Spree – primary artist
- Vance Powell – engineer
- The Raveonettes – primary artist
- Noël Regney – composer
- Royal Crown Revue – primary artist
- Geoff Sanoff – engineer
- Adam Schlesinger – producer
- Monica Seide – compilation producer, producer
- Shag – design, graphic design, layout design
- Phil Spector – composer
- Speekers – producer
- Vicky Tafoya – primary artist
- Louie Teran – mastering
- Laura Usiskin – cello
- Sune Rose Wagner – composer, producer
- Chris Walla – engineer, mixing, producer
- Steve Weisberg – composer
- Emily Yaffe – viola
- Ianthe Zevos – design coordinator

Credits adapted from Allmusic.
