= Lydia (band) =

American indie rock band

- Origin: Gilbert, Arizona, U.S.
- Genres: Indie rock, emo
- Years active: 2003–2010, 2011–present
- Labels: HourZero Lincstar Records Low Altitude Records
- Spinoffs: States, The Cinema, Gates, The Saturn Hands, Bears of Manitou
- Members: Leighton Antelman; Matt Keller; Shawn Strader; Evan Chapman
- Past members: Dustin Forsgren; Maria Sais De Sicilia; Loren Brinton; Evan Arambul; Ethan Koozer; Jed Dunning; Mindy White; Steve McGraw; Craig Taylor; Matt Funderburk; Justin Camacho

Lydia is an American indie rock band from Gilbert, Arizona, formed in 2003.

== History ==
Leighton Antelman, William Bradford, Evan Arambul, and Steve McGraw started writing music and booking shows when they were in seventh grade. The band really got their start as Rolo 15 while attending Greenfield Jr. High. They then went on to change the name to Nextabest. After that the band broke up, Antelman and McGraw continued to write and play music. They then soon added drummer Loren Briton and bassist Dustin Forsgren. They won a contest and were able to get a song on the Atticus: ...Dragging the Lake, Vol. 3 compilation CD.

Lydia was signed to the Arizona-based record label HourZero, through which they released their debut album This December; It's One More and I'm Free. Since then, they have toured extensively throughout the country and participated in the Zumiez Couch Tour, Vans Warped Tour, and The Bamboozle festival. They also played on the first annual Bamboozle Roadshow with Saves The Day, Armor For Sleep, Set Your Goals and Metro Station in 2008.

In 2007, Lydia won the award for Best Emo Band at the 2007 Arizona Ska Punk Awards Ceremony in Phoenix, Arizona. The band won the award again the following year, as well as the award for Best Indie Band, at the 2008 Awards Ceremony. In 2010, the band took home the Best Indie Band Award once again at the 2010 Arizona Ska Punk Awards.

They released their second album, Illuminate on March 18, 2008. They went on a late summer tour with The Dear Hunter, Eye Alaska and You, Me, and Everyone We Know. It was announced on August 25, 2008, that the band had signed to Low Altitude Records and re-released Illuminate on October 21, 2008. They went on tour with Copeland, Lovedrug, and Lights in November.

They shot a video for the song "I Woke Up Near The Sea" in December and released it online on February 24. The video was a success among fans, and won the Video of the Year Award at the 2009 Arizona Ska Punk Awards Ceremony in Phoenix, Arizona.

The band went on their first headlining tour, called the "Illuminate Yourself Tour" in February with Black Gold and also did a West Coast headlining tour with PlayRadioPlay!, Eye Alaska and Brave Citizens. On October 12, 2009, they released a tour only EP titled Hotel Sessions which features 4 acoustically re-recorded songs off their first album.

=== Hiatus ===
It was announced on March 10, 2010, that Mindy White had decided to leave the band. The band finished recording in the studio with producer Matt Malpass for their next release which was given a tentative release date of July 2010

On May 11, 2010, a version of "We Clean Up So Well" was posted on their Myspace page with a note announcing that the band will break up after a nationwide tour in July. The tour was titled "The Lydia Finale: A Goodbye & Farewell Tour".

In a later interview, Leighton explained the breakup, stating, "It's quite simple, the two original band members don't want to put out music together anymore. Simple as that."

Their third album, Assailants was released to online retailers on July 20, 2010. The album stayed in the Top 15 albums sold spot for over two days.

It was announced on July 12, 2010, that guitarist Steve McGraw had decided to leave the band and would not be playing on their final tour. On September 15, 2010, a trailer was released for their first ever DVD, Lydia: A Goodbye and Farewell. It was announced on December 22 that all of the footage for the DVD was lost in a hard drive crash.

On September 30, they made announced plans to take their farewell tour to Australia in late November. The band also released a music video for their song, "I've Never Seen A Witch".

=== Return from Hiatus ===
The band returned in September 2011 with a new song, "Dragging Your Feet in the Mud". An album, Paint it Golden, was released in October, 2011. The band released a cover of "Have Yourself A Merry Little Christmas" on December 20, 2011.

The band supported The Maine on their 2012 Spring/Summer tour. They were featured with Arkells and The Maine on a cover of The Beatles "With A Little Help From My Friends" that was released on May 1, 2012, on Spotify and featured two live tracks on The Maine's The Pioneer North American Tour Live EP.

They spent the end of 2012 recording their new album and going to a west coast winter tour. To accompany the tour, they released the Acoustics EP.

On January 28, 2013, they announced new tour dates and a March 19, 2013, release date for their new album Devil. They released their first single from the album, "Knee Deep" the next day. Following this, the band re-released Devil as a deluxe edition with a bonus disc of b-sides on October 15, 2013.

On December 17, 2013, the band announced plans to play Illuminate from start to finish across North America in the spring of 2014.

=== Run Wild ===
On August 7, 2015, Lydia announced the release date, cover art, and first single from their upcoming fifth LP, which was released on September 18, 2015. The first single is titled "Past Life", and is available for streaming through the band's SoundCloud account. Pre-orders for the new album were made available in various formats including vinyl and CD. Leighton Antelman stated in an article featured on Alternative Press that the new album would be "a little darker" than their last release, 2013's Devil. The forthcoming album, titled Run Wild, will coincide with a 30-date tour alongside Turnover and Seahaven. For Run Wild, the band worked with two producers—Colby Wedgeworth and Copeland's Aaron Marsh—and vocalist Leighton Antelman explained via press release, "This was the first time for us using two producers. We simply felt like the more the merrier. When ideas start pouring out and bouncing around the room something special happens there."

On August 21, 2015, the band released their second single from Run Wild, titled "Late Nights" through their website. The track was made available for streaming and free download.

=== Liquor ===
On March 8, 2018, Lydia announced the release date, track listing, cover art, and first single from Liquor, their sixth LP. The first single is titled "Goodside". Pre-orders for the album were made available in various formats including vinyl and CD. "Goodside" was made available for purchase on March 9, 2018.

=== I Was Someone Else ===
On October 30, 2020, Lydia announced their new album I Was Someone Else would be released on November 20, 2020.

=== This December (A Favorite of my Dreams) ===
On December 18, 2020, Lydia released their new album, 'This December (A Favorite of my Dreams)'. This album is a complete re-imagining of their 2005 debut album. Maria Sais De Sicilia reappears on this album.

=== Illuminate (She Saved Me) ===
On June 27, 2025, Lydia released their new album, 'Illuminate (She Saved Me)'. This album is a complete re-imagining of their 2008 sophomore album. Mindy White reappears on this album.

== Related bands ==
- Ethan Koozer is currently playing guitar for the New Jersey–based band gates which contains former members of Bears & Bright Lights. Their debut EP, The Sun Will Rise and Lead Me Home was released on January 25, 2011. They released their second EP, You Are All You Have Left to Fear on May 29, 2012, and released their first full-length, Bloom & Breathe in 2014.
- Mindy White formed a band with Bryan and Stephen Laurenson (formerly of the band Copeland) called States. Their first release, the Line 'em Up EP was released on October 12, 2010. They released their first full-length album, Room to Run on October 18, 2011, and released it on June 19, 2012, via Tooth & Nail Records.
- Leighton Antelman and producer Matt Malpass created a project called The Cinema. They released their debut album, My Blood Is Full of Airplanes on September 13, 2011. They also released a collaborative EP with rapper Somnous titled, Postcards on June 15, 2012.
- Steve McGraw plays under the name The Saturn Hands. They released their first song "Silver Spoon-Fed Sleep Part 1" on January 11, 2010. On March 30, 2010, they released another song titled "Junk Brain Pie".
- Maria Sais de Sicilia joined the band Bears of Manitou with touring member Matt Funderburk. They released their debut album Origins on March 14, 2012.
- Loren Brinton has played drums for A Rocket to the Moon, Brighten and Austin Gibbs and the States.

== Band members ==
=== Current members ===
- Leighton Antelman – lead vocals, guitar
- Matt Keller – keyboard, guitar, programming
- Shawn Strader – bass guitar
- Evan Chapman – drums, percussion

=== Former members ===
- Dustin Forsgren – bass guitar, vocals
- Maria Sais De Sicilia – vocals, keyboard
- Loren Brinton – drums
- Evan Arambul – bass guitar
- Ethan Koozer – guitar
- Jed Dunning – bass guitar
- Mindy White – vocals, keyboard
- Steve McGraw – guitar
- Justin Camacho – guitar
- Craig Taylor – drums
- Jeremy King – guitar, vocals

== Studio albums ==
- This December; It's One More and I'm Free (2005)
- Illuminate (2008)
- Assailants (2010)
- Paint It Golden (2011)
- Devil (2013)
- Run Wild (2015)
- Liquor (2018)
- I Was Someone Else (2020)
