= This December; It's One More and I'm Free =

Studio album by Lydia
- Released: September 27, 2005
- Genre: Indie rock
- Length: 50:32
- Label: Hourzero Records
- Producer: Mixed by Cory Spotts, produced by Antelman/McGraw

Lydia chronology
This December; It's One More and I'm Free (2005)	Illuminate (2008)

Professional ratings
Review scores
Source	Rating
Absolutepunk.net	(93%)
Sputnik Music	3.5/5 stars

This December; It's One More and I'm Free is the debut album by Lydia. It was released on September 27, 2005. On September 28, 2015, to commemorate the 10th anniversary of the album, the band announced they would release the record on vinyl for the first time ever.

== Track listing ==
No.	Title	Length
1.	"Smile, You've Won"	4:11
2.	"It's In Your Blood"	5:04
3.	"A Story for Supper"	7:54
4.	"Always Move Fast"	3:28
5.	"Fools and Luxury"	5:18
6.	"Laugh Before You Grin"	4:46
7.	"...When the Ghosts Make Love Again"	3:00
8.	"Her and Haley"	5:55
9.	"A Camera Lens and Careful Days"	5:19
10.	"December"	5:37
Total length:		50:32

== Notes ==
- "Fools and Luxury" has two samples at the end that follow into "Laugh Before You Grin". The first is from Kolchak: The Night Stalker and the second is from Mr. Deeds Goes to Town.
- During the song "A Camera Lens and Careful Days", a short monologue can be heard from an interview with George Jung.
- The cover art was designed by Jason Oda.
- Tracks 3, 4, 8 and 9 were re-recorded by the band and on their Hotel Sessions EP in 2009.
- In 2020, the band released a reimagined version of this album called This December (A Favorite Of My Dreams)

== Personnel ==
Band

- Leighton Antelman – guitar, vocals, piano
- Steve McGraw – guitar, organ
- Loren Brinton – drums
- Maria Sais De Sicilia - vocals, piano
- Evan Aranbul - bass

Additional musicians

- Dustin Forsgren– bass on tracks 1, 3 and 10. Backing vocals on tracks 1 and 3.

Production

- Produced by Leighton Antelman and Steve McGraw
- Mixed by Cory Spotts
- Mastered by Jason Livermore
