= Illuminate (Lydia album) =

Studio album by Lydia
- Released: March 18, 2008; October 21, 2008 (Reissue)
- Recorded: 2007
- Genre: Indie rock
- Length: 43:03
- Labels: Linc Star Records; Low Altitude Records
- Producer: Matt Malpass

Lydia chronology
This December; It's One More and I'm Free (2005)	Illuminate (2008)	Hotel Sessions EP (2009)

Singles from Illuminate
- 1. "This is Twice Now" Released: March 17, 2008; 2. "I Woke Up Near The Sea" Released: November 18, 2008

Professional ratings
Review scores
Source	Rating
Absolutepunk.net	(86%)
Sputnik Music	3.5/5 stars

Illuminate is the second studio album by Lydia. It was released on March 18, 2008, and reissued by October 21, 2008 on Low Altitude Records.

== Track listing ==
No.	Title	Length
1.	"This Is Twice Now"	3:00
2.	"A Fine Evening for a Rogue"	3:37
3.	"I Woke Up Near the Sea"	3:21
4.	"Hospital (feat. Aaron Marsh of Copeland)"	3:29
5.	"Fate"	3:38
6.	"Sleep Well"	4:24
7.	"Stay Awake"	5:08
8.	"All I See"	4:58
9.	"One More Day"	3:48
10.	"...Ha Yeah It Got Pretty Bad"	1:02
11.	"Now the One You Once Loved Is Leaving"	6:38
Total length:		43:03

Pre-Order Bonus Tracks
No.	Title	Length
12.	"Your Taste Is My Attention"	4:41

== Notes ==
- The album was streamed entirely on AbsolutePunk.net on March 17, 2008.
- The artwork for the album was designed by and drawn by artist Becky Filip .
- There were only 5,000 copies printed on Linc Star Records.
- Punk76.com was the first international magazine from Germany that reviewed their music.
- AbsolutePunk.net named Illuminate their "Best of 2008" in a combined end of the year staff list.

== Personnel ==
Band

- Leighton Antelman - vocals, piano
- Steve McGraw - guitar
- Craig Taylor - drums
- Ethan Koozer - guitar
- Mindy White - vocals, piano
- Evan Aranbul - bass

Additional musicians

- Aaron Marsh - Vocals on "Hospital" and trombone on "All I See"

Production

- Produced by Matt Malpass, Leighton Antelman and Steve McGraw
- Engineered by Matt Malpass
- Mastered by Kim Rosen and Alan Douches
