= Beneath Medicine Tree =

Studio album by Copeland
- Released: March 25, 2003
- Recorded: November 4, 2002 – January 1, 2003
- Genre: Alternative rock, emo, indie rock
- Length: 44:14
- Label: The Militia Group
- Producer: Matt Goldman and Copeland

Copeland chronology
Copeland/Pacifico (2001)	Beneath Medicine Tree (2003)	The Pale/Copeland Split EP (2004)

Professional ratings
Review scores
Source	Rating
Punknews.org	3/5 stars

Beneath Medicine Tree is the first full-length album from Copeland. Beneath Medicine Tree features a heavy medical theme. Aaron Marsh admits that the lyrics in this album were inspired by the hospitalization of his girlfriend and the death of his grandmother. The album booklet includes photographs by then-bassist James Likeness of hospital scenes. Marsh cites that, "With Beneath Medicine Tree, I wanted to make a record that moves people, while with In Motion, I wanted to make a record that makes people move."

Vulture.com described "When Paula Sparks" as the emo centerpiece of the album, "being one of [the emo genre's] deepest and richest examinations of grief."

== Track listing ==
1. "Brightest" – 2:05
2. "Testing the Strong Ones" – 3:36
3. "Priceless (For Eleanor)" – 4:50
4. "Take Care" – 4:10
5. "When Paula Sparks" – 4:54
6. "California" – 5:26
7. "She Changes Your Mind" – 3:48
8. "There Cannot be a Close Second" – 3:38
9. "Coffee" – 4:46
10. "Walking Downtown" – 3:06
11. "When Finally Set Free" – 3:55

The title track, "Beneath Medicine Tree", was not included in the final release of this album, but was instead re-written and released as "Love Is a Fast Song" on their second album, In Motion.
