= Talking in Your Sleep =

Talking in Your Sleep may refer to:

- Somniloquy, the act of talking while asleep
- "Talking in Your Sleep" (Crystal Gayle song), 1978
- "Talking in Your Sleep" (The Romantics song), 1983
- Talking in Your Sleep (The Cinema album), 2014
- Talking in Your Sleep (Lena Philipsson album), 1988
- "Talking in Your Sleep", a song by Gordon Lightfoot from the album Summer Side of Life
