= Ixora (album) =

Studio album by Copeland
- Released: November 24, 2014
- Recorded: 2014
- Studio: Marsh's Studio, Lakeland, Florida
- Genre: Alternative rock, indie pop
- Length: 41:53
- Label: Tooth & Nail
- Producer: Aaron Marsh

Copeland chronology
You Are My Sunshine (2008)	Ixora (2014)	Blushing (2019)

Ixora is the fifth album by Florida-based indie rock band Copeland. Pre-orders were made available on April 1, 2014, and the album was originally scheduled to be released on October 30, 2014. Due to issues during recording that prolonged its completion, the album's release date was postponed until November 24, 2014.

Ixora was recorded and produced in Aaron Marsh's studio, The Vanguard Room, in Lakeland, Florida, and was mixed by Michael Brauer. In addition to the standard ten-track album, a twin, deluxe edition was also recorded and made available for purchase as part of a pre-order exclusive bundle. The twin edition is a double-disc set. Disc one is an extended version of Ixora that contains an additional bonus track, while disc two is an alternate version of the album. Like a remix album, it can be listened to on its own but it can also be played in sync with disc one. In theory, playing both discs at the same time will create a quadraphonic version of Ixora.

== Track listing ==
No.	Title	Length
1.	"Have I Always Loved You?"	2:52
2.	"Disjointed"	4:36
3.	"I Can Make You Feel Young Again"	4:05
4.	"Erase"	4:27
5.	"Lavender"	4:11
6.	"Ordinary"	3:31
7.	"Like a Lie"	4:28
8.	"Chiromancer" (featuring Steff Koeppen)	4:43
9.	"World Turn"	4:03
10.	"In Her Arms, You Will Never Starve"	4:57

Deluxe version bonus tracks
No.	Title	Length
11.	"Like I Want You" (featuring Steff Koeppen)	4:26

Twin version
No.	Title	Length
1.	"Have I Always Loved You?"	2:52
2.	"Disjointed"	4:36
3.	"I Can Make You Feel Young Again"	4:05
4.	"Erase"	4:27
5.	"Lavender"	4:11
6.	"Ordinary" (featuring Steff Koeppen)	3:31
7.	"Like a Lie"	4:28
8.	"Chiromancer" (featuring Steff Koeppen)	4:43
9.	"World Turn" (featuring Steff Koeppen)	4:03
10.	"In Her Arms, You Will Never Starve"	4:57
11.	"Like I Want You" (featuring Steff Koeppen)	4:26

== Reception ==
Professional ratings
Aggregate scores
Source	Rating
Metacritic	77/100
Review scores
Source	Rating
AbsolutePunk	10/10 stars
AllMusic	3.5/5 stars
Rock Sound	7/10 stars

Ixora has been well received by critics, with Metacritic awarding the album an aggregate score of 77/100 based on four reviews. Keagan Ilvonen of AbsolutePunk wrote, "There hasn’t been a Copeland album as complete as Ixora". Mark Demming of AllMusic stated, "Copeland is embracing a more mature subject matter than they did on their early albums, but with the same moody and thoughtful musical approach that marked their best-known work".

== Personnel ==
Copeland

- Aaron Marsh – vocals, guitar, bass, piano, keyboards, trombone, programming, string and wind arrangements
- Bryan Laurenson – guitar, keyboards
- Stephen Laurenson – guitar, keyboards, programming
- Jonathan Bucklew – drums, percussion

Guest musicians

- Steff Koeppen – vocals on "Ordinary" (only Twin version), "Chiromancer", "Like I Want You" and "World Turn" (only Twin version)
- Matthew Davis – cello
- Joshua Dampier – violin, viola
- Matt Evers – bassoon
- Steve Jones – trumpet
- Jesse Bryant – clarinet
- Eva Stillinger – French horn
- Dawn Hardy – oboe
- Mikel Larrinaga – sax

Production

- Produced by Aaron Marsh
- Mixed by Michael Brauer, Quad Studio, New York
- Mastered by Joe LaPorta
