= Dressed Up & in Line =

Compilation album by Copeland
- Released: November 20, 2007
- Recorded: 2007
- Genre: Indie rock, emo, alternative rock
- Label: The Militia Group
- Producer: Matt Goldman, Aaron Marsh, Bryan Laurenson

Copeland chronology
Eat, Sleep, Repeat (2006)	'''Dressed Up & in Line''' (2007)	You Are My Sunshine (2008)

Professional ratings
Review scores
Source	Rating
AllMusic	3/5 stars

Dressed Up & In Line is a B-sides and rarities album by the band Copeland. It was released on November 20, 2007. The album consists of B-sides, rarities, acoustic recordings, and remixes. Aaron Marsh, lead vocalist and lyricist of the band, said, "Nearly all of [the songs] have been spruced up and re-mixed."

The album was leaked to the Internet on November 9, 2007.

== Track listing ==
1. "You Love to Sing" (Slow Version) - 2:45
2. "Thanks to You" - 3:53
3. "Sleep" (Premix) - 4:09
4. "Chin Up" (Demo) - 3:11
5. "Careful Now" (Acoustic) - 2:44
6. "Black Hole Sun" (Soundgarden) - 4:35
7. "No One Really Wins" (Acoustic) - 3:40
8. "Interlude" - 2:02
9. "Every Breath You Take" (The Police) - 5:59
10. "May I Have This Dance" - 4:18
11. "That Awful Memory of Yours" - 3:18
12. "Second Star to the Left, Go 'Til Dawn" - 3:55
13. "Brightest" (Acoustic) - 2:09
14. "When Paula Sparks" (Alternate Version) - 5:52
15. "Thanks to You" (DJ Cakeface Remix) - 3:29
16. "Black Hole Jon" - 19:39†

† After a long period of silence, a joke outtake of "Black Hole Sun" comes in.

== Personnel ==
- Tom Blair & The West Coasters – guitar
- Jon Bucklew – drums
- Rusty Fuller – percussion
- Matt Goldman – drums, producer, engineer, mixing
- Bryan Laurenson – guitar, programming, backing vocals, producer, mixing
- James Likeness – bass guitar, backing vocals, design, layout design
- Aaron Marsh – bass guitar, guitar, piano, keyboards, vocals, producer, mixing
- Jarrett Smith – bass guitar, cover photo
- Troy Stains – guitar

== Album information ==
The album was originally planned as a two-disc collection, to be released on November 27. After a tour with The Rentals, however, Aaron Marsh's voice was extremely fatigued and irritated by acid reflux. Several of the songs planned to be on the record needed vocals, so the band decided to leave them off. The band also did not want the album to be too highly priced. They said, "We didn't want this album to be expensive for anyone to buy, especially since many of these tracks are out there already. Since double-disc sets are traditionally more expensive, we couldn't guarantee that retailers would keep the price reasonable." They decided to release a second volume or companion EP at some time in the near future.
