= In Motion (Copeland album) =

Studio album by Copeland
- Released: March 22, 2005
- Genres: Emo, alternative rock
- Length: 41:40
- Labels: The Militia Group; TMG-030
- Producers: Matt Goldman, Aaron Marsh

Copeland chronology
Know Nothing Stays the Same (2004)	In Motion (2005)	Eat, Sleep, Repeat (2006)

Professional ratings
Review scores
Source	Rating
AbsolutePunk	(92%)
AllMusic	3.5/5 stars
PopMatters	(7/10)

In Motion is the second full-length album by the Lakeland, Florida-based band Copeland. It was released in 2005. The album includes a bonus disc of the Sony Connect Sessions with acoustic versions of "Don't Slow Down," "Pin Your Wings," "Take Care," and "Coffee," the latter two of which are taken from Beneath Medicine Tree.

The album peaked at #115 on the Billboard 200.

== Critical reception ==
AllMusic wrote that In Motion "is a surprisingly varied album, offering everything from the muscular emo attack of 'No One Really Wins' to the waltz-time accordion-and-falsetto strangeness of 'Kite.'" Seattle Weekly wrote that the album is characterized by an "emo-tinged whine." Paste called the album "disarmingly anthemic power pop filtered through some unexpectedly theatrical Southeastern sun."

== Track listing ==
1. "No One Really Wins" (A. Marsh) – 3:26
2. "Choose the One Who Loves You More" (A. Marsh, S. Nichols, B. Laurenson) – 5:01
3. "Pin Your Wings" (A. Marsh) – 3:11
4. "Sleep" (A. Marsh, B. Laurenson) – 4:52
5. "Kite" (A. Marsh) – 4:04
6. "Don't Slow Down" (A. Marsh, B. Laurenson) – 4:13
7. "Love Is a Fast Song" (A. Marsh, B. Laurenson) – 4:45
8. "You Have My Attention" (A. Marsh, B. Laurenson) – 4:02
9. "You Love to Sing" (A. Marsh, B. Laurenson) – 4:54
10. "Hold Nothing Back" (A. Marsh) – 2:56

All music written and arranged by Copeland except "Choose the One Who Loves You More," written by Copeland and Stephen Nichols.

== Personnel ==
- Aaron Marsh - vocals, guitars, keyboards, production
- Bryan Laurenson - guitars, keyboards
- James Likeness - bass guitars, layout and design, photography
- Jonathan Bucklew - drums, percussion
- Matt Goldman - production, engineering, additional percussion
- Troy Stains - additional engineering, additional guitars on "No One Really Wins", "Kite" and "Don't Slow Down", lap steel guitar on "You Love to Sing"
- Ken Andrews - mixing
- Mike Fossenkemper - mastering
- Stephen Nichols - additional vocals on "Choose the One Who Loves You More"
- Chris Arias - accordion on "Kite"
