= Weathered (EP) =

EP by Angie Miller
- Released: November 12, 2014
- Recorded: 2014
- Genre: Pop rock
- Length: 17:16

Weathered is the debut extended play (EP) by American singer-songwriter Angie Miller. It was released independently on November 12, 2014. Weathered serves as her first release after placing in the Top 3 on the twelfth season of American Idol.

== Development ==
"With this EP, I wanted to take it to the next level. I want everything I sing about to be honest. Each song is a moment in my life and a certain stage in the past two years — the good times, the bad times, the stress, growing up and learning from mistakes and what I'd see happen around me."

—Miller talking about Weathered to The Hollywood Reporter.

In August 2014, Miller announced via her official website that she would release her debut EP in November. A month later, the EP's title was confirmed to be Weathered, with a release date set for November 12 and its artwork was also revealed.

== Promotion ==
A PledgeMusic campaign was launched in August 2014 in order to promote the album.

== Critical reception ==
AllMusic's Mark Deming gave the album three out of five stars, highlighting Miller's mature "emotional perspective".

== Track listing ==
| No. | Title | Length |
|---|---|---|
| 1. | "Universe Electric" | 3:08 |
| 2. | "Miles" | 3:09 |
| 3. | "Simple" | 2:54 |
| 4. | "Lost in the Sound" | 2:52 |
| 5. | "This is the Life" | 3:01 |
| 6. | "Weathered" | 2:12 |
| Total length: | | 17:16 |

== Release history ==
| Region | Date | Format(s) | Label | Ref. |
|---|---|---|---|---|
| United States | November 12, 2014 | Digital download | Independent | |
