= Vicky Tafoya =

Background information
- Born: Victoria Tafoya; May 15, 1968; Santa Ana, California, U.S.
- Died: August 2, 2025 (aged 57) Riverside, California, U.S.
- Genres: Doo-wop, rhythm and blues, rockabilly, soul, garage rock
- Occupations: Singer, songwriter
- Years active: 1980s–2025
- Labels: Penrose, El Toro, Burger
- Formerly of: Vicky Tafoya and the Big Beat; The Redondos; Vicky and the Vengents

Vicky Tafoya was an American singer and songwriter known for her contributions to the Southern California roots music revival, spanning genres such as doo-wop, rockabilly, and soul. She was the frontwoman for the band Vicky Tafoya and the Big Beat. In 2019, she signed with Penrose Records, an imprint of Daptone Records, which brought her work to a wider audience prior to her death in 2025.

== Early life ==
Tafoya was born in Santa Ana, California, the youngest of 12 siblings. Her musical sensibilities were shaped by her mother and older siblings, who exposed her to music from the 1950s and 1960s. She cited "My Boyfriend's Back" and artists such as Frankie Lymon, Dion, and The Belmonts as early influences.

In the late 1980s, shortly after high school, Tafoya joined the Doo-Wop Society of Southern California. She began performing a cappella at local venues and became an active participant in the region's burgeoning rockabilly and swing revival scenes.

== Career ==
Tafoya's career spanned several decades and various musical projects that explored different facets of mid-century American music.

=== Vicky Tafoya and the Big Beat ===
In 2001, she co-founded Vicky Tafoya and the Big Beat, a group that blended doo-wop harmonies with rhythm and blues. The band released the EP Meet The Beat! in 2004 on El Toro Records. The group became a staple of the Southern California roots scene, performing at car shows and festivals such as the Viva Las Vegas Rockabilly Weekender.

=== Other projects ===
Tafoya formed The Redondos, a doo-wop group, in 2004 with Eddie Nichols, the frontman of Royal Crown Revue.

She also explored garage rock and "girl group" sounds with the band Vicky and the Vengents, formed in 2008. The group was noted for its "psychedelic malt shop punk rock" style and released material through Burger Records.

=== Penrose records ===
In 2019, Tafoya signed with Penrose Records, a label imprint founded by Daptone Records' Gabriel Roth dedicated to the "souldies" sound. This partnership led to the release of singles such as "Forever" and "The Moment," which featured higher production values and introduced her to a contemporary soul audience.

== Personal life and death ==
Tafoya was married to Vincent Maldonado, who served as the guitarist for her band. Maldonado died in 2021. Following his death, Tafoya dedicated the song "My Vow to You" to his memory.

Tafoya died of colon cancer on August 24, 2025, at Riverside Community Hospital in Riverside, California. She was 57 years old.

== Discography ==
=== Singles ===
- "Forever" / "My Vow to You" (2020, Penrose Records)
- "The Moment" / "Love Don't Treat You Fair" (2020, Penrose Records)

=== Albums and EPs ===
- Meet The Beat! (2004, El Toro Records) – with The Big Beat
- Cry Now, Smile Later (2011, Burger Records) – with The Vengents
- Never Let Go, Vol. 1 (2015, Self-released)

=== Other appearances ===
- "Baby, It's Cold Outside" (2004) – on holiday compilation Maybe This Christmas Tree
