= Angie Miller (American singer) =

American singer-songwriter (born 1994)

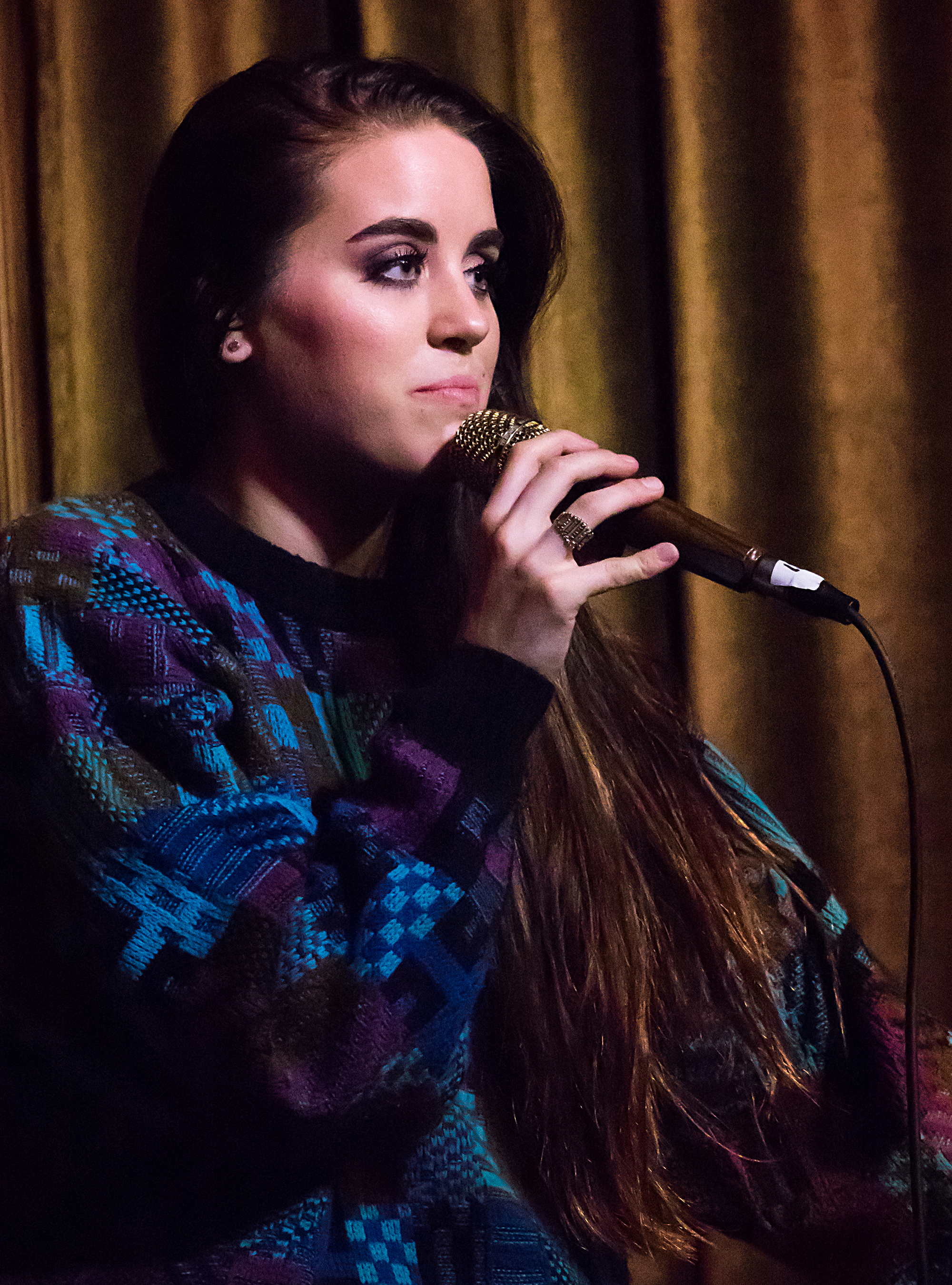
- Miller in 2016

Background information
- Also known as: Zealyn
- Born: Angela Kristine Miller; February 17, 1994 (age 32); Beverly, Massachusetts, US
- Genres: Pop rock; alternative rock; electropop
- Occupations: Singer; songwriter
- Instruments: Vocals; piano
- Years active: 2013–present
- Labels: Independent; 19
- Website: zealyn.co

Angela Kristine "Angie" Miller (born February 17, 1994), also known by her stage name Zealyn, is an American singer-songwriter and pianist. She came in third place on the twelfth season of American Idol in 2013. Her debut EP, Weathered, was released independently on November 12, 2014. Miller rebranded in 2016, opting for the stage name, "Zealyn". Since 2016, she has self-released four extended plays. In 2020, she founded the Los Angeles based nonprofit, Push-Up Bra LA, a music development organisation with an emphasis on supporting independent female musicians and songwriters in the recording industry.

== Early life ==
Angela Kristine Miller was born on February 17, 1994, in Beverly, Massachusetts, a suburb of Boston. Her father, Guy, and mother, Tana, graduated from Valley Forge Christian College in Phoenixville, Pennsylvania. The couple relocated to Massachusetts after Guy attended Gordon-Conwell Theological Seminary in South Hamilton to prepare for ordination as a Christian minister. The Millers served at churches in Lynnfield and on Cape Cod, where they resided for eight years, before becoming co-pastors at Remix Church, a member of the Assemblies of God protestant denomination, in Salem. Miller has an older brother named Jonathan. He was an integrant of hardcore band, Exiting the Fall, from 2013 until 2015.

At an early age, doctors diagnosed that the singer experienced 40-percent hearing loss in her left ear and 20-percent in her right, after discovering that the protective envelope of her eardrums had vanished. Consequently, she had ear tubes placed and, a month prior to her American Idol audition, fits for silicon spray ear plugs. Miller's condition has affected her singing, obstructing her hearing of her surroundings, rather than herself. She claimed that she learned to manage it a couple of years prior to her American Idol audition. In January 2013, her mother revealed to The Salem News that a third surgery to skin graft her eardrum was impending once Miller completed her stint on the series.

As a child, she was introduced to worship music at church and various other styles at home. The Millers are a musical family: Guy plays the keyboard, Tana plays the guitar, and Jonathan plays multiple instruments. Through watching them perform, Miller developed an interest for singing and songwriting at an early age, penning her first effort "Little Sparkle Dress" at age six. Her engagement in children's theatre further nourished her desire to perform. At the age of nine, Miller became an avid fan of the singing competition television series American Idol after seeing the second season finale, which made her long to someday enter the competition herself. She initially began playing guitar, but switched over to piano after receiving lessons from an instructor in Cape Cod. Though never receiving formal vocal training, she refined her singing with critiques from her mother and brother.

Miller attended Beverly High School from 2008 to 2012, involving herself in the school's choir, honors vocal ensemble, and theatre program. She appeared in installments of The Will Rogers Follies, My Fair Lady, and Thoroughly Modern Millie. She was an active participant at her father's church as well, leading music during services. During high school, she also held a job at a fast-food restaurant at Northshore Mall in Peabody, and ran a popular YouTube account where she posted videos of herself covering modern hits. In 2011, Miller placed seventh out of over 1,000 contenders in the female solo category at the Assemblies of God National Fine Arts Festival in Phoenix, Arizona. She received scholarship offers from three Christian universities, including her top choice, Southwestern Assemblies of God University in Waxahachie, Texas. Miller did not accept any of the colleges' offers, and instead decided to audition for American Idol upon completing her high school studies.

== Music career ==
=== 2012–13: American Idol ===
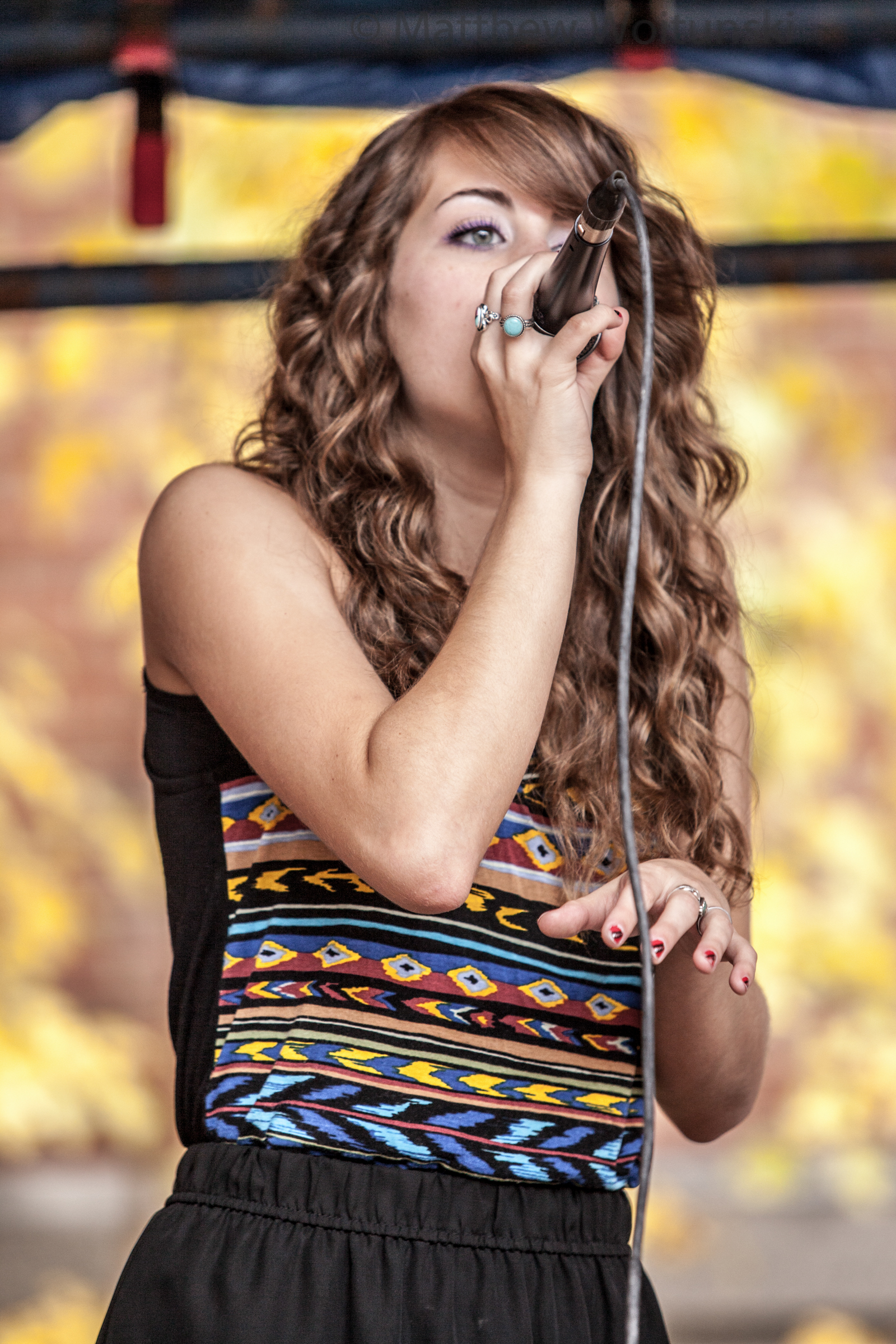
Miller performing at a local event in Salem, Massachusetts

Miller auditioned for the twelfth season of American Idol in September 2012 at the Prudential Center in Newark, New Jersey, where she received a golden ticket and advanced to the next stage in Hollywood. During the season's final Hollywood rounds, Miller opted to perform the self-penned tune "You Set Me Free" on the piano, and was praised from the judges. At first introduced as Angela, she later adopted the moniker, "Angie", with which judge Keith Urban referred to her. Miller proceeded to perform without her piano, despite the judges' suggestions; she permanently retreated to the piano during the Top 7 episode. During the course of the series, Miller tackled songs by Jessie J, Beyoncé, Colton Dixon and others, dominated social media relative to her peers, and was called out for her resemblance to singer Miley Cyrus.

Miller was considered a fan favorite, often placing in the voting's top ranks and becoming the season's sole contestant to not land in the bottom 2 or 3 until her elimination in the Top 3. The elimination was described by journalists as "shocking" and "surprising," to which they attributed competitor Kree Harrison's victory to support from Vote for the Worst, voting from Middle America, and pity votes prompted by her homecoming video. Conversely, Kevin Rutherford of Billboard said the singer's elimination was caused by her inability match the accolades of her "You Set Me Free" performance. Others ascribed her choice to perform Elton John's "Sorry Seems to Be the Hardest Word" without playing the song on the piano. For her final performance, Miller reprised her version of Dixon's "Never Gone" in tears, at times unable to sing, and later approached by her family onstage. Following the elimination, she expressed shock at the results, but claimed both finalists deserved the position in the finale.

==== Performances and results ====
American Idol season 12 performances and results
Episode	Theme	Song	Original artist	Order	Result
Audition	Auditioner's Choice	"Mamma Knows Best"	Jessie J	N/A	Advanced
Hollywood Round, Part 1	A Capella	"Who You Are"	Jessie J	N/A	Advanced
Hollywood Round, Part 2	Group Performance	"Be My Baby" with Janelle Arthur, Kez Ban and Breanna Steer	The Ronettes	N/A	Advanced
Hollywood Round, Part 3	Solo	"You Set Me Free"	Angie Miller	N/A	Advanced
Las Vegas Round	Personal Choice	"Nobody's Perfect"	Jessie J	8	Advanced
Top 20 (10 Women)	Personal Choice	"Never Gone"	Colton Dixon	6	Advanced
Top 10 Reveal	Victory Song	"I Was Here"	Beyoncé Knowles	8	Advanced
Top 10	Music of the American Idols	"I Surrender"	Celine Dion	4	Top 3
Top 9	The Beatles	"Yesterday"	The Beatles	7	Safe
Top 8	Music of Motor City	"I'm Gonna Make You Love Me" with Candice Glover and Amber Holcomb	Dee Dee Warwick	6	Safe
Top 8	Music of Motor City	"Shop Around"	The Miracles	8	Safe
Top 7	Rock	"Crazy Little Thing Called Love" with Lazaro Arbos	Queen	2	Top 3
Top 7	Rock	"Bring Me to Life"	Evanescence	10	Top 3
Top 6	Burt Bacharach and Hal David	"Anyone Who Had a Heart"	Dionne Warwick	1	Safe
Top 6	Songs They Wish They'd Written	"Love Came Down"	Brian Johnson	7	Safe
Top 5	Year They Were Born	"I'll Stand by You"	The Pretenders	4	Safe
Top 5	Divas	"Halo"	Beyoncé Knowles	9	Safe
Top 4	Contestant's Choice	"Who You Are"	Jessie J	4	Safe
Top 4	Contestant's Choice	"Stay" with Candice Glover	Rihanna featuring Mikky Ekko	6	Safe
Top 4	One-Hit Wonders	"Cry Me a River"	Julie London	10	Safe
Top 4^{1}	Songs from Now and Then	"Diamonds"	Rihanna	1	Safe
Top 4^{1}	Songs from Now and Then	"Someone to Watch Over Me"	Gertrude Lawrence	5	Safe
Top 4^{1}	Songs from Now and Then	"Wings" with Candice Glover, Kree Harrison, and Amber Holcomb	Little Mix	9	Safe
Top 3	Jimmy Iovine's Choice	"Sorry Seems to Be the Hardest Word"	Elton John	3	Eliminated
Top 3	Judges' Choice	"Try"	Pink	5	Eliminated
Top 3	Producers' Choice	"Maybe"	Emeli Sandé	7	Eliminated

- ^Note 1 Due to the surprise non-elimination, the Top 4 remained intact for another week.

=== 2013–2015: Weathered ===
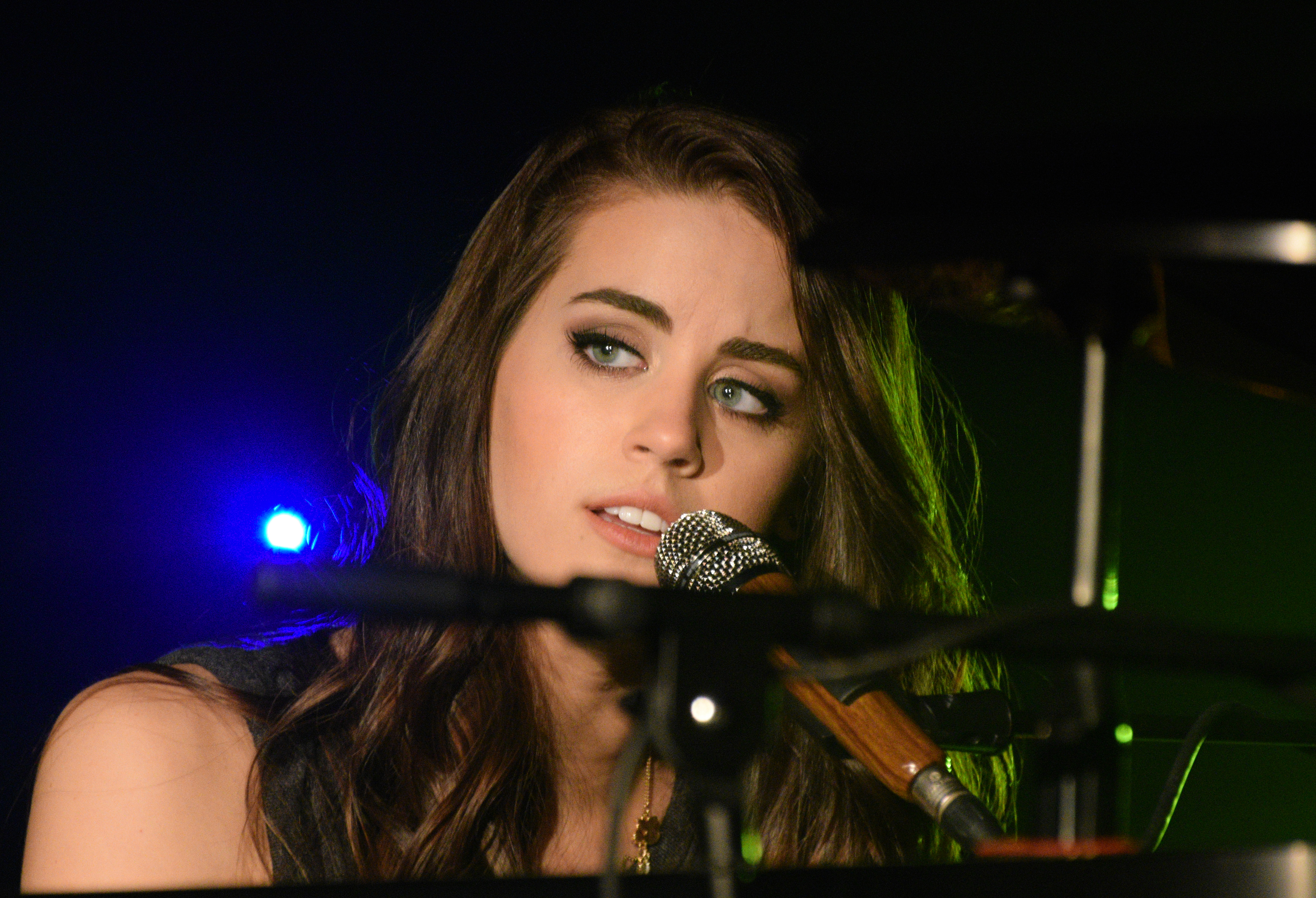
Miller performing at the piano in 2015

After her elimination from American Idol, Miller announced plans to launch a music career as soon as possible, as well as an eventual acting career. Of her intents for her debut studio album, Miller revealed that she wanted to write or co-write all material. She also intended to show all sides to her personality in an intricate and artistic manner which she feels current mainstream music largely lacks. She further explained,

I want to have music that has meaning and is real. I don't want to have dance-party music, but at the same time, I don't want to put people to sleep. I want to incorporate the soulful piano sound with a lot of edge. I know the message that I want to send out, and I know the music I want to do. I can't wait to show it to people.

The top three finalists – Miller, Candice Glover and Harrison – recorded background vocals on a song for judge Mariah Carey's fourteenth studio album, though it is yet to be confirmed whether it will be on the final track listing. On May 17, 2013, subsequent to the series' finale, Miller released her debut single "You Set Me Free" to digital retailers via her American Idol contract with 19 Recordings. On May 22, 2013, reports surfaced that Miller had signed a publishing contract with Universal Music Publishing Group (UMPG), and is in midst of searching for a record deal. In June 2013, Miller confirmed she was co-writing with Toby Gad, Autumn Rowe, David Hodges, Adam Watts and his Red Decibel team and recording demos in Los Angeles, California, through social media. Along with the remainder of the Top 11 from season twelve, Miller embarked on the American Idols LIVE! Tour 2013, where she showcased original music, from July to August 2013. Later that year she also joined Jessie J at a concert of her Nice to Meet You Tour in the United Kingdom.

On December 3, 2013, Miller released a Christmas single, called "This Christmas Song" and a cover of "O Holy Night." In April 2014, Miller embarked on the "Angie in Asia" tour in Thailand, Vietnam and Indonesia.

A PledgeMusic campaign for her debut EP, Weathered, was launched on August 28, 2014 and was released on November 12, 2014. On October 13, 2014, Miller premiered a song from the EP, "Lost in the Sound," and a second song, "Miles" was premiered by Billboard on October 29, 2014. On November 20, 2014, Weathered debuted at number one on the Billboard Top Heatseekers chart and at number 131 on the Billboard 200 chart. In 2015, she released her first music video, for the song "Simple", the only single from the EP. In September 2015, she traveled to Kolkata, India to perform several small concerts around the city.

=== 2016–2019: Limbic System and A Weekend in Maine ===
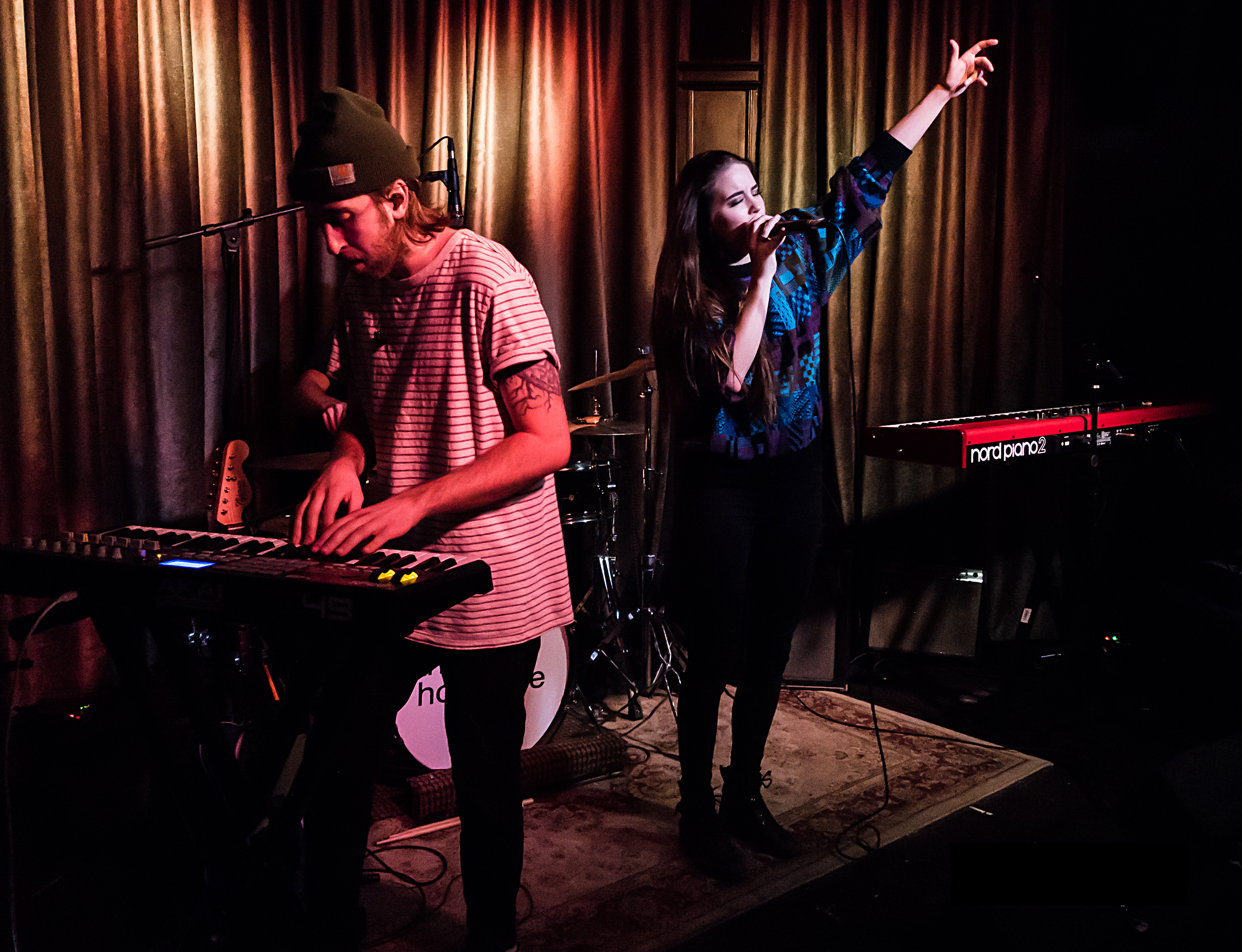
Miller performing as Zealyn in 2016

In February 2016, Miller announced that her new music, which she had begun writing in early 2015, would be released under the pseudonym Zealyn. According to Miller, the name Zealyn originated from the country New Zealand, with a friend recommending her to make it into a girl's name. Miller expressed a desire to change her stage name and the direction of forthcoming music releases in order to separate herself from the image she had created as a contestant on American Idol in her late teens. She did not believe that her previous music or image were marketable under her birth name due to its lack of appeal. On February 20, 2016, her song "Tides To The Moon" was featured in a trailer for "Little Mermaid."

She debuted her first single, "Talk:Listen" for streaming on February 26, 2016; it was released on March 4, 2016, for digital download. A second song, "Sleep On It", premiered via Nylon magazine's official website. The song was available for digital download on April 1, 2016. Her alternative rock and electropop EP, Limbic System, was released on June 24, 2016, containing seven songs. "Limbic System" was recorded in two months during July and August 2015 at singer Aaron Marsh's studio in Lakeland, Florida. She co-wrote the songs for the album, along with her then-fiance, David Williams. The album's title song, "Limbic System" featuring JMR, was released for streaming on April 29, 2016. "Overwhelmed" featuring Aaron Marsh was released for streaming on May 25, 2016. The remix EP, Limbic System: Reimagined, was released on June 9, 2017, and features music remixed by Jon Santana, Sleeping Lion, The Lulls in Traffic, Stephen Laurenson, and Austin Cannon.

On May 17, 2019, her second EP, A Weekend in Maine, was released. Miller returned to her hometown of Beverly, Massachusetts to perform a concert, featuring music from the EP on June 13, 2019. The concert was the first show for her 2019 tour in the United States. The EP's title was inspired by the family trips to Maine when she was a child. The song, "Faster Now", written in 2015 and originally intended for her debut EP, was written as a reflection of Miller's struggles with the pressure of songwriting and expectations of the recording industry.

=== 2022–present: I Think I'm Struggling with Getting Older and Keep Your Chin Up, Kid ===
In September 2022, her third EP, I Think I'm Struggling with Getting Older was released on streaming platforms. She performed songs from the EP at its official release party on September 19, 2022 in Los Angeles. The single, "Odd Behavior" and its accompanying music video, was inspired by Quentin Tarantino's work, of which Miller is a fan. Her fourth EP, Keep Your Chin Up, Kid, was released for streaming on June 24, 2024. Miller revealed in an Instagram post that the single, "Glory to God", was written about her childhood as a pastor's kid in a strict household and her experience with religious trauma due to her upbringing.

=== Other ventures ===
Miller is the co-founder of the music development nonprofit, Push-up Bra LA. The nonprofit was started in 2020 due to Miller's belief that female musicians, songwriters, and producers, needed to have equal representation in the male-dominated recording industry. The nonprofit hosts female-only songwriters camps and talent showcases, featuring female-only musicians in the Los Angeles area. Artists who perform at the showcases are paid through audience donations. Miller has performed at several Push-Bra LA showcases, singing music of her own composition from various independent EP releases.

== Personal life ==
Miller moved to Los Angeles, California, in early 2014, to continue pursuing a professional music career after her participation on American Idol ended. She and her longtime boyfriend, David James Williams, became engaged in late November 2015. They married in a small ceremony in Massachusetts on July 7, 2016. Williams serves as a co-writer, co-producer, and guitarist for her EP recordings and tours. She is a fan of The 1975, MØ, Khalid, and The Killers, and expressed in an interview in 2019 that she desired to collaborate with all of them.

== Discography ==
=== As Angie Miller ===
==== Extended plays ====
List of albums, with selected chart positions and certifications
Title	Details	Peak chart positions		
Title	Details	US	US Heat	US Indie
Weathered	Released: November 12, 2014; Label: Independent; Format: CD, Digital download	131	1	13

==== Singles ====
Title	Year	Peak chart positions	Album
Title	Year	US	Album
"You Set Me Free"	2013	—	Non-album single
"This Christmas Song"	2013	—	Non-album single
"O Holy Night"	2013	—	Non-album single

==== Music video ====
- "So Simple" (2015)

==== Releases from American Idol ====
- "I Surrender"
- "Yesterday"
- "Shop Around"
- "Bring Me to Life"
- "Anyone Who Had a Heart"
- "Love Came Down"
- "I'll Stand by You"
- "Halo"
- "Who You Are"
- "Cry Me a River"
- "Diamonds"
- "Someone to Watch Over Me"
- "Try"

=== As Zealyn ===
==== Extended plays ====
List of extended plays
Title	Details
Limbic System	Released: June 24, 2016; Label: Independent; Formats: CD, digital download
A Weekend in Maine	Released: May 17, 2019; Label: Independent; Format: Digital download
I Think I'm Struggling With Getting Older	Released: September 9, 2022; Label: Independent; Format: Digital download
Keep Your Chin Up, Kid	Released: June 24, 2024; Label: Independent; Format: Digital download

==== Remix albums ====
List of remix albums
Title	Details
Limbic System: Reimagined	Released: June 17, 2017; Label: Independent; Format: Digital download

==== Singles ====
Title	Year	Peak chart positions	Album
Title	Year	US	Album
"Talk:Listen"	2016	—	Limbic System
"Sleep On It"	2016	—	Limbic System
"Limbic System (featuring JMR)	2016	—	Limbic System
"Overwhelmed (featuring Aaron Marsh)	2016	—	Limbic System
"Enjoy Your Holiday"	2018	—	A Weekend in Maine
"Airline Wine"	2018	—	A Weekend in Maine
"Faster Now"	2019	—	A Weekend in Maine
"So Damn Charming"	2019	—	Non-album single
"Odd Behavior"	2022	—	I Think I'm Struggling with Getting Older
"Glory to God"	2024	—	Keep Your Chin Up, Kid
"Christmas Eve"	2024	—	Keep Your Chin Up, Kid

==== Music videos ====
Year	Title	Artist
2016	"Talk:Listen"	Zealyn
2016	"Sleep On It"	Zealyn
2016	"Overwhelmed" (featuring Aaron Marsh)	Zealyn
2019	"So Damn Charming"	Zealyn
2022	"Odd Behavior"	Zealyn
2024	"Glory to God" feat. Silas	Zealyn and Silas
2024	"Christmas Eve"	Zealyn

== Tours ==
- 2013: American Idols LIVE! Tour 2013
- 2013: Nice to Meet You Tour (Guest Star for Jessie J)
- 2013: Celebrate Christmas Tour
- 2014: Fox International: Angie In Asia
- 2015: Mini-tour in India (as Angie Miller)
- 2017: Limbic System Parts 1 & 2 (as Zealyn)
- 2019-21: A Weekend in Maine (U.S. and Europe shows as Zealyn)
- 2023: I Think I'm Struggling with Getting Older (as Zealyn)
- 2024: Keep Your Chin Up, Kid (EP release show in Los Angeles as Zealyn)
