= Universal Motown Records =

2005–2011 American record label

- Parent company: Universal Music Group (UMG)
- Founded: 2005; 21 years ago
- Founder: Universal Music Group
- Defunct: 2011; 15 years ago
- Status: Merged into Republic Records
- Distributors: Universal Motown Republic Group (United States); Universal Island Records (International)
- Genre: Various
- Country of origin: United States
- Location: New York City, U.S.

Universal Motown Records was an American record label that operated as a division of Universal Motown Republic Group. It was a contemporary incarnation of the massively successful soul label Motown Records, and the "urban" half of the Universal Records label, although there were some rock artists on the label (along with its sub-labels) as well. Due to internal restructuring at UMG, it was shuttered in 2011, eventually replaced by Republic Records and a modern Motown under The Island Def Jam Music Group.

== Background ==
Following a period of internal turmoil beginning after Berry Gordy's departure from the company in 1988, Universal Music Group would absorb the original Motown records a decade later in 1998, which was to be headed up by Kedar Massenburg. Then in 2005, Massenburg was replaced by former Elektra Records CEO Sylvia Rhone, who had Motown Records merged with the urban artists (along with a few rock artists) on Universal Records to create Universal Motown Records and placed under the newly created umbrella division of Universal Motown Republic Group.

Motown Records began celebrating its fiftieth anniversary (January 12, 2009) in late 2008, including the release of a The Complete No. 1's boxset containing Motown #1 hits from Billboard's pop, R&B, and disco charts, reissues of classic-era Motown albums on CD, and other planned events, which were released in collaboration with Universal Music Enterprises, Universal Music Group's catalog division.

Changes were made at Universal Motown Republic Group in 2011, and Motown Records was separated from Universal Motown Records and the umbrella label and merged into The Island Def Jam Music Group, making Universal Republic Records (shortened to Republic Records by late 2012) a stand-alone label and effectively shutting down Universal Motown Republic Group.
