= Eat, Sleep, Repeat =

Studio album by Copeland
- Released: October 31, 2006
- Recorded: June–July 2006
- Genres: Indie rock, emo, alternative rock
- Length: 42:07
- Label: The Militia Group TMG-049, Columbia
- Producers: Aaron Marsh, Matt Goldman

Copeland chronology
In Motion (2005)	Eat, Sleep, Repeat (2006)	Dressed Up & in Line (2007)

Professional ratings
Review scores
Source	Rating
AbsolutePunk	(90%)
AllMusic	4/5 stars

Eat, Sleep, Repeat is the third full-length release and major label debut from Lakeland, Florida's Copeland. It was recorded at Glow in the Dark in Atlanta during June and July 2006. "We always said that we would only consider working with a label that was passionate about our band and our music, and the folks at Columbia are just that," the band said in a blog on its MySpace page. "Nothing drastic will change other than the fact that hopefully a few more ears will get to hear our music."

== Track listing ==
1. "Where's My Head" – 2:16 (A. Marsh)
2. "Eat, Sleep, Repeat" – 5:00 (A. Marsh, B. Laurenson)
3. "Control Freak" – 3:49 (A. Marsh, B. Laurenson)
4. "Careful Now" – 3:39 (A. Marsh)
5. "Love Affair" – 5:31 (A. Marsh)
6. "I'm Safer in an Airplane" – 2:55 (A. Marsh)
7. "By My Side" – 3:20 (A. Marsh, B. Laurenson)
8. "Cover What You Can" – 2:00 (A. Marsh)
9. "The Last Time He Saw Dorie" – 3:57 (A. Marsh)
10. "I'm a Sucker for a Kind Word" – 3:53 (A. Marsh, B. Laurenson)
11. "When You Thought You'd Never Stand Out" – 5:47 (A. Marsh)
12. "Chin Up" – 3:13 (only featured on the Japanese edition and special versions exclusive to Circuit City)

== Personnel ==
- Aaron Marsh - vocals, guitars, keyboards
- Bryan Laurenson - guitars, keyboards
- Jonathan Bucklew - drums
- James Likeness - bass, layout and design
- Aaron Marsh and Matt Goldman - production
- Matt Goldman and Bryan Laurenson - mixing
- Matt Malpass - additional engineering
- Gavin Lurssen - mastering (at The Mastering Lab)
- Anna Becker - additional vocals
- Rachel Plating - violin and viola
- Robert Hugel - French horn and video documentary
- Justin Spears - trumpet and flugelhorn
- Kyle Griner - management
- Nick Storch - booking
- James Douglas Adams - painting and illustrations
