= Devil (Lydia album) =

Studio album by Lydia
- Released: March 19, 2013; October 15, 2013 (Deluxe Edition)
- Recorded: 2012
- Genre: Indie rock
- Length: 32:10; 51:02 (Deluxe Edition)
- Label: Self released

Lydia chronology
Acoustics EP (2012)	Devil (2013)	Run Wild (2015)

Singles from Devil
- 1. "Knee Deep" Released: January 29, 2013; 2. "The Exit" Released: March 18, 2013

Deluxe edition B-sides disc

Devil is the fourth album by Lydia. It was released on March 19, 2013.

== History ==
On January 29, 2013, the band released the album art, release date, and the first single off the album.

The band released a deluxe edition of the album on October 15, 2013. It featured four new songs and acoustic versions of "The Exit" and "Devil".

== Track listing ==
No.	Title	Length
1.	"The Exit"	3:32
2.	"Runaway"	3:07
3.	"Knee Deep"	2:50
4.	"Devil"	3:55
5.	"Back to Bed"	3:10
6.	"Holidays"	3:33
7.	"Hurry Back Tonight"	3:57
8.	"Now I Know..."	1:32
9.	"Take Your Time"	3:09
10.	"From a Tire Swing"	3:25
Total length:		32:10

Devil Deluxe edition (B-sides)
No.	Title	Length
1.	"We'll Never Die"	2:52
2.	"Do You Remember"	3:08
3.	"What's the Worst That Could Happen?"	3:02
4.	"Wish You Well"	3:36
5.	"The Exit (Acoustic)"	2:50
6.	"Devil (Acoustic)"	3:24
Total length:		18:52

== Charts ==
Chart (2013)	Peak position
US Billboard 200	180
