= Liquor (Lydia album) =

Studio album by Lydia
- Released: July 13, 2018
- Recorded: 2017
- Genre: Indie rock, indie pop
- Label: Weekday Records/Sony Music Entertainment

Lydia chronology
Run Wild (2015)	Liquor (2018)

Singles from Liquor
- 1. "Goodside" Released: March 9, 2018; 2. "Sunlight"; 3. "Let It Cover Me Up"

Professional ratings
Review scores
Source	Rating
Dead Press!	6/10
Sputnikmusic	2.5/5 stars

Liquor is the sixth album by American indie rock band Lydia. The album was released on July 13, 2018, through Weekday Records/Sony Music Entertainment. The first single, "Goodside," was released on March 9, 2018.

== History ==
On March 8, 2018, Lydia announced the release date, track listing, cover art, and first single from Liquor, their sixth LP. "Goodside" was made available for purchase on March 9, 2018.

== Critical reception ==
Sputnikmusic wrote that "for the first time ... it appears that Lydia has released an album that is precisely average."

== Track listing ==
No.	Title	Length
1.	"Sunlight"	3:34
2.	"Friends"	3:32
3.	"Lie to Me"	3:50
4.	"Let It Cover Me Up"	3:42
5.	"Red Lights"	3:09
6.	"Way You Want It"	3:14
7.	"Goodside"	3:14
8.	"Gypsy"	3:25
9.	"Tourists"	3:54
10.	"Way Out"	3:56
Total length:		35:30

== Charts ==
Chart (2018)	Peak position
US Heatseekers Albums (Billboard)	6
