= Paint It Golden =

Studio album by Lydia
- Released: October 4, 2011
- Recorded: 2010
- Genre: Indie rock
- Length: 35:35
- Label: Self released
- Producer: Matt Malpass

Lydia chronology
Assailants EP (2010)	Paint It Golden (2011)	Acoustics EP (2012)

Singles from Paint It Golden
- 1. "Dragging Your Feet in the Mud" Released: September 26, 2011; 2. "Hailey"; 3. "Best Nights"

Professional ratings
Review scores
Source	Rating
Absolutepunk.net	(95%)

Paint It Golden is the third album by Lydia. It is their first album after coming back from hiatus and was released on October 4, 2011.

== History ==
On May 17, 2011, it was announced that after a year long hiatus, Leighton and Craig would bring back the band to record a new album under the same name.

They released the song and music video for "Dragging Your Feet in the Mud" on September 26, 2011. The music video for "Best Nights" was released on July 7, 2012.

== Track listing ==
No.	Title	Length
1.	"Hailey"	2:43
2.	"Dragging Your Feet In the Mud"	3:16
3.	"Eat Your Heart Out"	3:57
4.	"Get It Right"	3:33
5.	"Best Nights"	3:34
6.	"I'll Bite You"	3:25
7.	"Seasons"	3:22
8.	"Ghosts"	3:39
9.	"Skin+Bones"	3:24
10.	"Birds"	4:42
Total length:		35:35

== Notes ==
- The title of the album was taken from a line in the song "Eat Your Heart Out".
- Tracks 1, 4, and 5 were acoustically re-recorded and released on the band's 2012 Acoustics EP.
