= Assailants (EP) =

EP by Lydia
- Released: July 20, 2010
- Recorded: 2010
- Genre: Indie rock
- Length: 21:04
- Label: Self released
- Producer: Matt Malpass

Lydia chronology
Hotel Sessions EP (2009)	Assailants (2010)	Paint It Golden (2011)

Professional ratings
Review scores
Source	Rating
AbsolutePunk.net	(86%)

Assailants, originally slated to be the third album by Lydia, is the band's first official EP. It was released on July 20, 2010. The record was self released by the band after their record label passed on releasing it.

== History ==
It was announced on March 10, 2010 that Mindy White had decided to leave the band.

On May 11, 2010 a new unmastered song was posted on their MySpace called "We Clean Up So Well" with a note announcing that the band will break up after a nationwide tour in July. The tour was titled "The Lydia Finale: A Goodbye & Farewell Tour".

Guitarist Steve McGraw announced on July 12, 2010 that he had decided to leave the band and would not be playing on their final tour.

Two mini videos were released for "Assailants" and "We Clean Up So Well". They also released a full music video for "I've Never Seen A Witch" on October 6, 2010 which was directed by former drummer Loren Brinton.

== Track listing ==
No.	Title	Length
1.	"Enjoy the Show"	1:29
2.	"We Clean Up So Well"	3:42
3.	"Empty Out Your Stomach"	4:16
4.	"I've Never Seen a Witch"	3:36
5.	"Music Makers"	1:21
6.	"A Place Near the City"	3:29
7.	"Assailants"	3:11
Total length:		21:04

== Notes ==
- The song "A Place Near The City" was originally demoed under the name "Cliff Jumping".
- Despite the album actually being an EP, it has been regarded as their third album.
- Tracks 2 and 4 were acoustically re-recorded and released on the band's 2012 Acoustics EP.
