= Eason Chan discography =

- Studio albums: 32
- Extended plays: 6
- Compilation albums: 12
- Live albums: 12

This is the discography of Hong Kong singer Eason Chan (Chinese: 陳奕迅). Chan has won the Golden Melody Award multiple times. He has sold more than 20 million albums throughout his career. His 2016 single, "Keep Me By Your Side", was downloaded over 5,771,000 times in China.

== Studio albums ==
=== Cantonese albums ===
Title	Album details	Peak chart positions	Sales	Certifications
Title	Album details	HK	Sales	Certifications
Eason Chan (陳奕迅)	Released: 19 August 1996; Label: Capital Artists	—		
Always Be with Me (與我常在)	Released: 12 April 1997; Label: Capital Artists	6		
My Happy Days (我的快樂時代)	Released: 26 May 1998; Label: Capital Artists	4		
Blessed Love (天佑愛人)	Released: 26 May 1999; Label: Capital Artists	1		
Nothing Really Matters	Released: 21 July 2000; Label: Capital Artists	3		
Some Like it Hot (打得火熱)	Released: 29 September 2000; Label: Music Plus	—	HK: 50,000	IFPI HK: Platinum
Shall We Dance? Shall We Talk!	Released: 13 April 2001; Label: Music Plus	—		
The Easy Ride	Released: 8 November 2001; Label: Music Plus	—		
The Line-Up	Released: 24 July 2002; Label: Music Plus	—	HK: 100,000	IFPI HK: 2× Platinum
Live for Today	Released: 22 July 2003; Label: Music Plus	—		
U87	Released: 7 June 2005; Label: Cinepoly	—		
What's Going On ... ?	Released: 23 November 2006; Label: Cinepoly	—		
Listen to Eason Chan	Released: 18 October 2007; Label: Cinepoly	—		
H^{3}M	Released: 23 March 2009; Label: Cinepoly	—	HK: 50,000	HK: Platinum
... 3mm	Released: 10 August 2012; Label: Cinepoly	1		
The Key	Released: 22 July 2013; Label: Cinepoly	1		
Getting Ready (準備中)	Released: 10 July 2015; Label: Cinepoly	1		
L.O.V.E.	Released: 12 December 2018; Label: EAS Music, Universal Hong Kong	1		
Chin Up!	Released: 27 October 2023; Label: EAS Music, Universal Hong Kong	1		

=== Mandarin albums ===
Title	Album details	Peak chart positions		Sales	Certifications
Title	Album details	TWN	TWN Mand.	Sales	Certifications
A Drop of Tear (一滴眼淚)	Released: 10 January 1997; Label: Leader	—	—		
Brewing (醞釀)	Released: 1 August 1998; Label: Leader	—	—		
Blessed Wedding (婚禮的祝福)	Released: 9 September 1999; Label: Leader, What's Music	—	—		
It's Me, Eason (反正是我)	Released: 17 July 2001; Label: Music Plus, Avex	—	—		
Special Thanks to ...	Released: 2 April 2002; Label: Music Plus, Avex	—	—		
Black, White, Gray (黑·白·灰)	Released: 15 April 2003; Label: Music Plus, Avex	—	—		
How (怎麼樣)	Released: 23 November 2005; Label: Cinepoly	13	8		
Admit It (認了吧)	Released: 24 April 2007; Label: Cinepoly	4	3	SGP: 5,000	RIAS: Gold
Don't Want to Let Go (不想放手)	Released: 1 July 2008; Label: Cinepoly	—	4		
5/F Blissful (上五樓的快活)	Released: 23 September 2009; Label: Cinepoly	—	—		
?	Released: 9 November 2011; Label: Cinepoly	5	4		
Rice & Shine (米·閃)	Released: 15 May 2014; Label: Cinepoly	2	2		
C'mon In~	Released: 9 October 2017; Label: EAS Music, Universal Hong Kong	—	—	TWN: 50,000; CHN: 100,000 (dig)	

== Extended plays ==
Title	Album details	Sales	Peak chart positions
Title	Album details	Sales	HK
Ultraman Tiga (超人迪加)	Released: 1998; Label: Capital Artists		—
Great Violent Thought (大激想)	Released: 1998; Label: Capital Artists		—
Happiness (幸福)	Released: 24 November 1999; Label: Capital Artists		2
Life Continues ...	Released: 17 February 2006; Label: Cinepoly Records Hong Kong		—
Time Flies	Released: 12 March 2010; Label: Cinepoly Records Hong Kong	HK: 30,000	—
Taste the Atmosphere	Released: 15 October 2010; Label: Cinepoly Records Hong Kong		—

== Compilations albums ==
Title	Album details	Peak chart positions
Title	Album details	HK
A New Life (新生活)	Released: 10 December 1998; Label: Capital Artists	1
68'29" (新曲+精選)	Released: 2000; Label: Capital Artists	—
Eason 18首選 (精選)	Released: 2001; Label: Capital Artists	—
4 a Change & Hits (新曲+精選)	Released: 2002; Label: Music Plus Limited	—
七 (新曲+精選)	Released: 2003; Label: Music Plus Limited	—
Great 5000 Secs – Vol. 1 (新曲+精選)	Released: 2005; Label: Music Plus Limited	—
Great 5000 Secs – Vol. 2 (新曲+精選)	Released: 2005; Label: Music Plus Limited	—
我的最好時代 (精選)	Released: 2006; Label: Music Plus Limited	—
Sound & Sight (新曲+精選)	Released: 2006; Label: Music Plus Limited	—
Sound & Sight (新曲+精選 KTV)	Released: 2006; Label: Music Plus Limited	—
你的, 陳奕迅 (精選)	Released: 2007; Label: Music Plus Limited	—
Solidays (新曲+精選)	Released: 2008; Label: Cinepoly Records	—
The First Eleven Years – 1997–2007 (精選)	Released: 2008; Label: Cinepoly Records	—

== Remix albums ==
Title	Album details
Mixed Up	Released: 24 July 2001; Label: Capital Artists

== Live albums ==
Title	Album details
New Life Concert (新生活音樂會)	Released: 1998; Formats: CD
加洲紅紅人館903狂熱份子演唱會	Released: 1999; Formats: VCD/DVD
Eason Chan's 99 Big Live (陳奕迅大個唱)	Released: 1999; Formats: VCD/DVD
叱咤903啦闊音樂 <Eason & Fans音樂會>	Released: 2000; Formats: CD/VCD/DVD
The Easy Ride Concert	Released: 2002; Formats: CD/VCD/DVD
拉闊音樂會：陳奕迅&林子祥	Released: 2002; Formats: CD/VCD/DVD
Third Encounter 陳奕迅演唱會Live	Released: 2003; Formats: CD/VCD/DVD
陳奕迅&葉蒨文 903 Id Club 拉闊音樂會	Released: 2004; Formats: CD/VCD/DVD
Get A Life: Eason Chan Concert in Hong Kong	Released: 2006; Formats: CD/VCD/DVD/Blu-ray
Eason Moving On Stage 1	Released: 2007; Formats: CD/VCD/DVD/Blu-ray
Eason Duo Concert	Released: 2010; Formats: CD/DVD/Blu-ray
Eason's Life Concert	Released: 2014; Formats: CD/DVD/Blu-ray

== Songs ==
Below is a list of songs that are composed, written, arranged or produced by Eason Chan.

1. 時代曲 (with 江港生) (from the album 陳奕迅)
2. 那一夜有沒有說 (from the album 與我常在)
3. 反高潮 (from the album 我的快樂時代)
4. 同聲一哭 (duet with Anita Mui) (from the album I'm So Happy of Anita Mui)
5. 你會不會 (from the album Special Thanks To...)
6. 給蕭邦寫過的歌 (sung by Sammi Cheng) (from the album 愛是... of Sammi Cheng)
7. PG家長指引 (sung by Edmond Leung) (from the album PG家長指引 of Edmond Leung)
8. 呼吸困難 (sung by Edmond Leung) (from the album Music Is The Answer of Edmond Leung)
9. 下週同樣時間 (再見)(from the album 打得火熱)
10. 溫室效應 (from the album 打得火熱)
11. 怪物 (from the album Shall We Dance? Shall We Talk)
12. 衝口而出 (with 王雙駿) (from the album The Easy Ride)
13. 改造人 (sung by Nicholas Tse) (from the album 幸福)
14. 我也不會那麼做 (from the album 反正是我)
15. 沒有你 (from the album 反正是我)
16. 落花流水 (with Eric Kwok) (from the EP Life Continues)
17. 大得太快 (from the EP Life Continues)
18. 戀愛盲 (with Edmond Leung) (Sung by Edmond Leung) (from the album The Story of June of Edmond Leung)
19. 新生活 (from the album 新生活)
20. 2001太空漫遊 (with 陳輝陽) (from the album Shall We Dance? Shall We Talk)
21. Namasgar你好嗎 (from the album OST 十二夜十二首)
22. 解藥 (from the album What's Going On...?)
23. 粵語殘片 (With C.Y. Kong) (from the album What's Going On...?)
24. 白色球鞋 (With C.Y. Kong) (from the album 認了吧)
25. 兄弟 (duet with Andy Lau) (from the album Listen To Eason Chan)
26. 乜嘢啫 (from the album Listen To Eason Chan)
27. 狂熱革命 (with Davy Chan) (from the album Listen To Eason Chan)
28. 換季 (sung by Hacken Lee) (from the album Today Special of Hacken Lee)
29. 沙龍 (from the album H3M, namely Hyper Horrendous Hybrid Maniac)
30. 給你 (from the album 5/F Blissful)
31. 習慣説 (with Eric Kwok) (from the album 3MM, namely 3 Married Men)
32. 床頭床尾 (from the album The Key),
33. 滴答(with CY Kong) (sung by楊幂)
34. 春去也 (sung by William So)
35. 人人愛 (with CY Kong)
36. 放過你 (duet with Joey Yung)
37. 新曲+精選
38. 心深傷透 (with CY Kong/Davy Chan/Hardpack) (from the album What's Going On...?)
39. 猜情尋 (with 吳國敬/孫偉明/陳永明) (from the album Live for today)
40. 歲月如歌 (with 劉志遠/李振權) (from the album Live for today)
41. 新歌 (with 陳光榮)(sung by Ekin Cheng)
42. 承諾 (with Peter Kam/Carl Wong/Alan Tam/Andy Lau/<黄家强)
43. 馬里奥派對 (with CY Kong/Davy Chan/Concord Wong) (from the album Listen to Eason Chan)
44. 熱島小夜曲 (with CY Kong/Davy Chan/Concord Wong/張亞東) (from the album Listen to Eason Chan)
45. 滑鐵盧車站 (with Tony/Steve/CY/Davy) (from the album Listen to Eason Chan)
46. 閃 (with CY/Davy) (from the album Listen to Eason Chan)
47. 演唱會 (with CY/Davy) (from the album Listen to Eason Chan)
48. Crying in the party (with CY/Davy) (from the album Listen to Eason Chan)
49. 變色龍 (with Carl Wong) (from the album Listen to Eason Chan)
50. 時代巨輪 (with Eric Kwok) (from the album Listen to Eason Chan)
51. Allegro Opus 3.3am (with Gary Tong/ CY/Davy) (from the album H3M, namely Hyper Horrendous Hybrid Maniac)
52. 還有什麽可以送給你 (with Davy/CY) (from the album H3M, namely Hyper Horrendous Hybrid Maniac)
53. 于心有愧 (with Davy/CY/鍾達恩) (from the album H3M, namely Hyper Horrendous Hybrid Maniac)
54. 今天只做一件事 (with Joey Tang/CY/Davy) (from the album H3M)
55. 一個旅人 (with Pak Lui/CY/Davy) (from the album H3M namely Hyper Horrendous Hybrid Maniac)
56. 七百年後 (with CY/Davy/Jim Lau) (from the album H3M namely Hyper Horrendous Hybrid Maniac)
57. Life goes on (with Gary Tong/孫偉明) (from the album H3M namely Hyper Horrendous Hybrid Maniac)
58. 太陽照常升起 (with Yin Wong/ CY/Davy) (from the album H3M namely Hyper Horrendous Hybrid Maniac)
59. 不來也不去 (with 梁飛翔/CY/Davy) (from the album H3M namely Hyper Horrendous Hybrid Maniac)
60. 後台 (with 梁飛翔/CY/Davy) (from the album Soliday)
61. 重口味 (with Swing@Eric Kwok/Swing@Jerald Chan) (from the album 3MM namely 3 Married Men)
62. 非禮 (with Eric/Jerald) (from the album 3MM namely 3 Married Men) # CLASS (with Swing) (from the album 3MM namely 3 Married Men)
63. 碌卡 (with Swing) (from the album 3MM namely 3 Married Men)
64. 笑死朕 (with Swing) (from the album 3MM namely 3 Married Men)
65. 蚊 (with Swing) (from the album 3MM namely 3 Married Men)
66. 床頭床尾 (from the album The Key)
67. 追求 (duet with Chinese badminton athlete)
68. 春去也 (sung by William So)
69. 刚刚好 (sung by Miriam Yeung)
70. 无耻 (sung by Juno Mak)
71. 可一可再 (from the album Eason and the Duo Band)
72. 内疚 （with 陈奂仁） (from the album "?")
