= Homoiōma =

Likeness but not at thesame level with what the subject is likened to

Homoiōma (ὁμοίωμα) is a Greek neuter noun for "likeness" which is particularly common in Jewish Koine Greek texts. The meaning of the word in several well-known New Testament verses is related to discussion in Christology about the relation of Christ to man.

== Etymology ==
The noun comes from the adjective homoios, "like".

== Usage ==
=== Classical usage ===
Use of the word as "image" is relatively common in Attic texts; the use in the singular is found in Plato (Phaedra 250a) and Aristotle (Rhetorica 1356a31). The word is found in inscriptions, on ostraca, and in the Tebtunis papyri.

=== Septuagint usage ===
The word is more common in Jewish usage than pagan. It appears frequently in the Septuagint, often in relation to idols. The term is used by Josephus in a similar way. The essential contrast is between the reality of God and a homoiōma or artifice. The representation may be two-dimensional such as a diagram graffiti or mural or three-dimensional such as carvings or figurines. The word may also be used in a qualitative or figurative sense; men "like the son of a king", daughters "adorned like a temple" creatures "with the likeness of a man." or, in Sirach as the likeness (homoiōma) of a face to a face.

=== New Testament usage ===
The word appears 6 times in the New Testament and in the KJV is rendered "likeness" "made like to" "similitude" and "shape". Two of these uses are fairly straightforward, following directly on from Septuagint usage - idols in the likeness of animals, and locusts with the likeness of horses. Another; a sin in the likeness of Adam's sin, is understandable within secular Greek usage. This leaves three other uses, one the likeness of death in Romans 6:5, two more in Paul's description of the likeness of Christ to other men.

== Interpretation ==
=== The likeness of death ===
In Romans 6:5 Paul introduces the concept of homoiōma between Christians and Christ in a grammatical structure which, although it only employs the word once, duplicates it with a double "of his death...also [in the likeness] of his resurrection".

=== The likeness of sinful flesh ===
Discussion in Christology centres on the significance of homoiōma in the writings of Paul, and in particular whether homoiōma in Romans 8:3 and Philippians 2:7 indicates a merely external or internal likeness with other men. Moo (1996) in discussing Romans 8:3 maintains that Paul cannot mean that Christ had only the "appearance" of sinful flesh. yet the meaning is constrained by the need to balance Paul's use of the same word in Philippians 2:7.

== Eucharist ==
In Patristic usage, and later in Greek Orthodox tradition, the concept of homoiōma, being more than just external likeness, is developed in concepts of eucharistic prayer and the rite of the eucharist.
