= My Blood Is Full of Airplanes =

Studio album by The Cinema
- Released: September 13, 2011
- Recorded: Marigolds + Monsters Studio
- Genre: Indie pop
- Length: 33:46
- Label: 81 Twenty Three
- Producer: Matt Malpass

The Cinema studio album chronology
My Blood Is Full of Airplanes (2011)	Talking In Your Sleep (2014)

Singles from My Blood Is Full of Airplanes
- 1. "Kill It" Released: May 16, 2011; 2. "The Wolf" Released: May 22, 2011; 3. "Say It Like You Mean It" Released: May 31, 2011; 4. "Picasso" Released: July 28, 2011

My Blood Is Full of Airplanes is the debut album by American indie pop band, The Cinema. Released on September 13, 2011, singles from the album include: "Kill It", "The Wolf", "Say It Like You Mean It", and "Picasso". The album was not released on a physical medium, and could only be acquired through digital music platforms. On May 16, 2011, The Cinema announced the release of its first single, "Kill It". In addition to the new track, the band also released an introduction video via their YouTube page. On May 20, 2011, The Cinema posted a clip of their second single, "The Wolf", on their Facebook page. They also announced plans to release a full version of the track on Tuesday, May 22, 2011. On May 25, 2011, AbsolutePunk reported that both singles were available for purchase through the iTunes store. On May 31, 2011, The Cinema released its third single titled "Say It Like You Mean It", and the track was available for download on iTunes the same day. The band released its forth and final single titled "Picasso" on July 28, 2011 .

On August 25, 2011, The Cinema announced that the band's debut album will be released on September 13, 2011. Leighton Antelman had this to say about the record:

"I really wanted to do this new project and album for the Cinema, because it was just a very different way to approach writing and one I hadn't experienced yet. I've always started Lydia records from scratch and by myself. Matt and I started sending The Cinema songs back and forth, coast to coast, really kind of calling each other out to keep making the songs better and surpassing the previous versions. I think that the fact that we are both stubborn and pretty damn picky, if we're being honest here, is really what made the songs and album what they are today. I think fans of the band can expect much more music to come from The Cinema."

The Cinema released the official track listing for their debut album on September 11, 2011.

== Reception ==
Professional ratings
Review scores
Source	Rating
AbsolutePunk	8.8/10 stars
Alter the Press	4/5 stars
Mind Equals Blown	7/10 stars
Property of Zack	4/5 stars
Sputnikmusic	3.8/5 stars
Under the Gun	9/10 stars

My Blood Is Full of Airplanes has received critical praise by music critics and fans. Absolutepunk gave the album a score of 88% approval and said, "The opening “Satellites” gives us the first lick of The Cinema. Laden with a thick beat, the track is incredibly memorable and will be stuck in your head after the first listen. On the other hand, the following “The Wolf” and single “Kill It” rely less on background effects, as Antelman really shines on each of these. At this point, it becomes clear that this record is just downright fun and catchy, while still having the edge we all love Lydia for." They went on to say, "In the end, the swift production proves to the be the backbone of the record, as tracks such as “Banker” prove the skill of programmer Matt Malpass, with the chorus wrapping perfectly around the electronic spine of the song. The final title track also dictates this skill more than ever. Being the softest song on the record, “My Blood Is Full of Airplanes” allows the chemistry between Malpass behind the tech and Antelman behind the mic to surface. The Cinema truly escalates the talent of Leighton Antelman and Matt Malpass to a different level."

== Track listing ==
No.	Title	Length
1.	"Satellites"	3:40
2.	"The Wolf"	3:32
3.	"Kill It"	3:33
4.	"Say It Like You Mean It"	3:33
5.	"Picasso"	3:29
6.	"Kinetic"	3:46
7.	"She's on My Arm Now"	4:06
8.	"Banker"	3:27
9.	"All the Lights"	3:37
10.	"My Blood Is Full of Airplanes"	3:57

== Personnel ==
- Leighton Antelman – vocals
- Matt Malpass – programming, production
