= The Morning Of =

American band

- Also known as: Don't Pass Go (2003-2004)
- Origin: Newburgh, New York
- Genres: Pop rock, indie rock
- Years active: 2005–2013, 2026-present
- Labels: Tragic Hero, LAB
- Members: Justin Wiley; Rob McCurdy; Jessica Leplon; Abir Hossain; Dan Celikoyar; Ryan Jernigan
- Past members: Chris Petrosino; Rob Curtis; James Bedore; Erin McMenemy; Jimmi Kane; Brian Butler; Joe Ricci; Chloe Lewis

The Morning Of is an American pop/indie/rock band originating from Newburgh, New York, United States. The band's first EP, Welcome Change. Goodbye Gravity, held a steady spot in the Top 50 best selling albums on Smartpunk.com for six months. In August 2006, they appeared at Dirt Fest. Their first full length effort, The World as We Know It debuted on the U.S. Billboard heatseekers chart at No. 18 and peaked at the No. 25 pop album on iTunes. They recorded their most recent album, "The Way I Fell In", with producer Jim Wirt (No Doubt, Jacks Mannequin, Incubus, Hoobastank, The Rocket Summer). The album was released on May 11, 2010 and debuted No. 10 on the U.S. Billboard heatseekers chart.

Following a support tour with The Dangerous Summer in 2010, and a European run in 2011, the band opted to perform live less frequently. The Morning Of performed for the final time on September 29 2013, before entering an unannounced hiatus.

In a Facebook post on June 6 2024, The Morning Of revealed they "didn’t really plan on doing anything as a band again" until receiving news of their two albums being released on vinyl. With this news, the band teased that there may be "more to come" in the future.

In a Facebook post on February 18 2026, the band announced a one-off reunion show in New York City, celebrating 21 years of the band. Bassist Abir Hossain announced his return to the band in the comments of the same post. Touring bassist Ryan Jernigan remained in the lineup, playing additional guitars and keys throughout the set. Founding member Chris Petrosino did not return, with his live contributions being replaced by playback.

== Members ==
Current Lineup

- Rob McCurdy - Guitar/Vocals (2005–2013, 2026-present)
- Abir Hossain - Bass/Lyricist (2005–2009, 2013, 2026-present), Lyricist (2010)
- Justin Wiley - Vocals/Guitar (2007–2013, 2026-present)
- Jessica Leplon - Vocals (2007–2013, 2026-present)
- Dan Celikoyar - Drums/Percussion (2009–2013, 2026-present)
- Ryan Jernigan - Touring Bass (2010-2013), Touring Guitar/Keyboards (2026-present)

Former Members

- Chris Petrosino - Piano/Guitar/Vocals (2005–2013)
- Jimmi Kane - Drums (2007–2008)
- James Bedore - Vocals (2005–2007)
- Rob Curtis - Drums (2005–2007)
- Erin McMenemy - Vocals/Keyboards (2006-2007)
- Ashley Widman - Keyboards/Vocals (2005)
- Chloe Lewis - Vocals (2009-2010)

== Discography ==
Albums

- 2004: This Is What We Live For (Digital EP)
- 2005: Welcome Change. Goodbye Gravity (self-released)
- 2006: The Morning Of (Japan Release)
- 2007: Welcome Change, Goodbye Gravity (THR Re-Release)
- 2007: The Digital EP
- 2008: The World as We Know It
- 2010: The Way I Fell In U.S. Heatseekers No. 10
- 2011: Europe EP
