= James Likeness =

- Born: James Likeness; March 19, 1979 (age 47)
- Genres: Alternative rock, indie rock
- Occupation: Musician
- Instruments: Guitar, vocals, bass guitar
- Years active: 2001–2007
- Labels: Columbia Records; The Militia Group

James Likeness is an American graphic designer and musician from Florida, best known as the bass player and back-up vocalist for Copeland.

== Education ==
Likeness earned an Associate of Arts degree in Visual Art from St. Petersburg College, followed by a Bachelor of Fine Arts from Florida State University.

== Career ==
Likeness was a founding member of Copeland, an indie rock band formed in 2001. He performed with the band until 2007, and also designed much of the group's cover artwork.

After leaving the band in 2007 to pursue a career in graphic design, Likeness went on to become the designer for indie label Drive-Thru Records in Santa Monica, California. During that time, Likeness reconnected with Jamie Tworkowski, founder of To Write Love on Her Arms, and began designing for the non-profit. Likeness returned Florida and established a permanent position with the non-profit To Write Love on Her Arms. He is currently Art Director for the company.

Likeness also does freelance graphic design under the company name TiredChildren. TiredChildren has created CD packaging, poster art, web design, and merchandise design for artists such as Copeland, Anberlin, The Rocket Summer, Hellogoodbye, Danger Radio, and We Shot the Moon. Likeness also created the album art for Angelas Dish's debut album, War on Time.
