= Aaron Marsh =

American musician and record producer

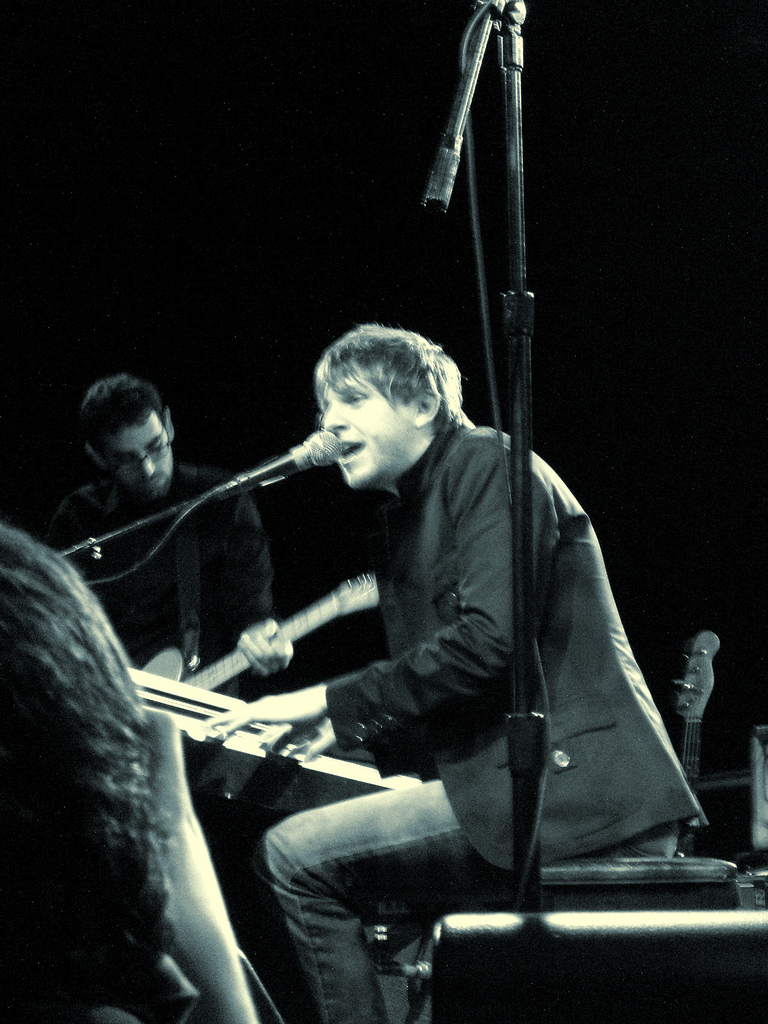
- Vocalist Aaron Marsh, 2007

Background information
- Born: August 30, 1980 (age 46); Eugene, Oregon, US
- Genres: Alternative rock; indie rock; indie pop; emo
- Occupations: Singer; musician; record producer; songwriter
- Instruments: Vocals; piano; guitar
- Years active: 2000–present
- Member of: Copeland
- Formerly of: The Lulls in Traffi; GLASWING
- Website: www.thelulls.net

Aaron Marsh (born August 30, 1980) is an American musician and record producer from Lakeland, Florida. He first gained prominence as the lead singer, guitarist, and pianist for the Florida-based indie rock band Copeland, which formed in 2001. Marsh has since gone on to numerous production projects, co-producing his own band's studio albums usually with either Matt Goldman or Aaron Sprinkle. Marsh also has worked as a film composer; his credits include the 2013 film Worm, the 2014 film A Bottle's Odyssey, and the 2018 film Shed.

== Early life and education ==
Aaron Marsh was born in Eugene, Oregon. When he was a year old, his family moved to Lakeland, Florida. Marsh attended Harrison School for the Arts, where he studied musical theory and trombone. While there, he formed the band evAngel with bassist and backup singer James Likeness and guitarist Thomas Blair. In 2001, Marsh attended Florida Southern College where he and Likeness formed the band that became Copeland.

== Music career ==
=== Copeland: 2001–2010 ===
Marsh and Likeness signed a record deal with the independent label The Militia Group in 2002. Copeland released its first album, Beneath Medicine Tree, a year later. The band would go on to release In Motion in 2005, Eat Sleep Repeat in 2006, Dressed Up and In Line in 2007, and You Are My Sunshine in 2008.

After the release of You Are My Sunshine, Marsh announced that the group would be taking an indefinite hiatus. Marsh stated on Copeland's MySpace page:

We have come to an extremely difficult decision. It has come time for us to move on from Copeland and follow other paths in our lives. We are absolutely grateful to have been able to make music for as long as we have. In the last 9 years, we've been able to see parts of the world that we never dreamt we would see. We have shared the stage and built friendships with immensely talented artists. We've been afforded the opportunity to make 4 records that we're extremely proud of. Most of all, we feel honored that people have cared so much for our band and for our art.

Copeland completed a farewell tour in early 2010.

=== The Lulls in Traffic ===
In 2011, Marsh started The Lulls in Traffic, an indie-rock and hip-hop band, with Russian/Los Angeles lyricist and visual artist Ivan Ives. Marsh calls it his "skewed view" of underground hip-hop. The band's album, Rabbit in the Snare, features guest appearances from Talib Kweli and Ceschi.

=== Copeland 2014 to present ===
In 2014, Copeland announced it would be reuniting and had secured a new record deal with Tooth & Nail Records. The announcement stated that the band was working on its fifth album, Ixora, at The Vanguard Room in Lakeland, Florida. The album was released later that year.

Copeland released its sixth studio album, Blushing, on February 14, 2019. On the record, Marsh is credited with lead vocals, backing vocals, piano, synthesizer, programming, Mellotron, guitar, bass guitar, trombone, and percussion. Copeland released its seventh album, Revolving Door, on September 16, 2022. Revolving Door is a best-of album arranged with a symphony orchestra.

=== Glaswing ===
In 2021, Marsh began a solo project under the name Glaswing. His album, I'm in the Checkout Line of My Life / Like Water on a Glass Table features lo-fi songs written by Marsh that feature his vocals and electronic music.

=== Other work ===
Marsh also has worked as a film composer. His credits include the 2013 film Worm, the 2014 film A Bottle's Odyssey, and the 2018 film Shed.

Marsh produced Anchor & Braille's debut album, Felt, which was released on August 4, 2009. His production was praised by both AbsolutePunk and Alternative Press in their reviews of the album.

== Style and influences ==
Marsh says his early musical influences were from the local Lakeland music scene, including Divine Child (aka Denison Marrs), Pilots V. Aeroplanes, and nora's breakfast club. He says Radiohead is his favorite band "of all time". Some of his non-indie rock influences are The Lulls, Madlib, Dilla, Squarepusher, and Aphex Twin.

== Discography ==
=== Copeland ===
- Beneath Medicine Tree (The Militia Group/Sony, 2003)
- In Motion (The Militia Group/Sony, 2005)
- Eat, Sleep, Repeat (Columbia Records/Sony, 2006)
- Dressed Up and In Line (Columbia Records/Sony, 2007)
- You Are My Sunshine (Tooth & Nail Records/EMI, 2008)
- The Grey Man (EP, Tooth & Nail/EMI, 2008)
- IXORA (Tooth & Nail/Sony, 2014)
- Twin (Independent/TVR, 2014)
- Blushing (Tooth & Nail/Sony, 2019)
- Revolving Doors (Independent, 2022)

=== The Lulls in Traffic ===
- Rabbit in the Snare

=== Glaswing ===
- I'm in the Checkout Line of My Life / Like Water on a Glass Table (2021)

=== Vocal contributions ===
Marsh has contributed guest vocals on a variety of songs.

- "Bittersweet Symphony" – Ace Enders and a Million Different People
- "Cynical" – Propaganda (2017)
- "Empty Bottles" – Stacy Clark
- "Forget Love, I Just Want You to Make Sense to Me Tonight" – Anchor & Braille
- "Gold Dust" – Emarosa (2015)
- "Heaven or Hell" – The Morning Of'
- "Hospital" – Lydia
- "Inevitable" – Anberlin
- "Let Love Bleed Red" – Sleeping With Sirens
- "Photographs" – Lakes
- "The Right Time" – Denison Marrs
- "Some Will Seek Forgiveness, Others Escape" – Underoath
- "Turn It On" – The Cinema (2014)
- "The Worst Of Your Wear" – Fair

=== Writing credits ===
- Be Fair – Estates
- Felt – Anchor & Braille
- Illuminate – Lydia

=== Production credits ===
- Anberlin – Lowborn (P/E)
- Anchor & Braille – Felt (P/E/M)
- Andrew Shearin – Have Hope, Have Heart EP (M)
- Author – People Are Alike All Over EP (P/E/M)
- Emarosa – Versus Reimagined - EP (P)
- Estates – Be Fair (P/E)
- Fairground – Fairground EP (P/E/M)
- Holly Ann – Ravens (P/E/M)
- Ivan Ives – Stranger (P/E/M)
- Jenny Dee – Dancing From a Distance
- Joshua Michael Robinson – Intentions (P/E/M)
- Lauren Mann and the Fairly Odd Folk – Over Land and Sea (P/E/M)
- Lydia – Illuminate (E)
- Lydia – Run Wild
- The Myriad – You Can't Trust A Ladder (P)
- Nikki Kummerow – Firecracker (P/E/M)
- Our Family Name – Begin At The Beginning (P/E)
- Pemberley – I'm Fine (P/E/M)
- Person L –The Positives (P/E)
- Poema –Once A Year: A Poema Christmas EP (P/E/M)
- Radial – Una Dia Extrano (P/E/M)
- SEU Worship – From The Vanguard Room (P/E/M)
- Speak Low – Nearsighted
- Summerbirds In the Cellar – Druids (E)
- The Tenant – Is Listening/Visitors
- This Wild Life – Clouded (P/E)
- This Wild Life – Low Tides (P/E)
- Valaska – Natural Habitat (P/E/M)
- Woodale – Don't Say It Too Late (E/M)
- Zealyn – Limbic System

P = Producer; E = Engineer; M = Mixing
