= Copeland (band) =

American rock band

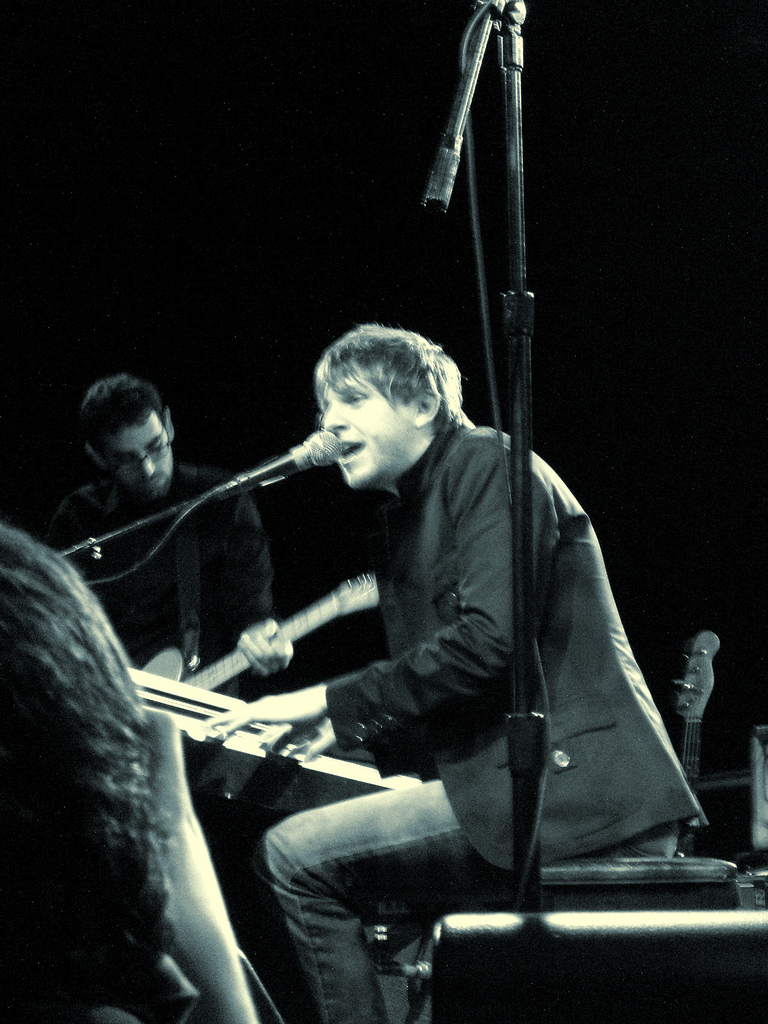
- Vocalist Aaron Marsh, 2007

Background information
- Origin: Lakeland, Florida, US
- Genres: Alternative rock; indie rock; indie pop; emo
- Years active: 2001–2010, 2014–present
- Labels: Tooth & Nail; Columbia; The Militia Group; Theory 8; Academy Fight Song
- Members: Aaron Marsh; Bryan Laurenson; Stephen Laurenson
- Past members: Jonathan Bucklew; Rusty Fuller; Thomas Blair; James Likeness
- Website: copeland.band

Copeland is an American rock band formed in 2001 by the singer, pianist Aaron Marsh (who also plays guitar) with his friend, the bass guitarist and backing vocalist James Likeness, in Lakeland, Florida. The band broke up in 2010 and reunited in April 2014.

== History ==
=== Inception ===
Aaron Marsh and Bryan Laurenson signed a record deal with the independent label The Militia Group in 2002 and released their first album, Beneath Medicine Tree, a year later. In 2004, 2005 and 2006, they performed at the annual Cornerstone Florida Festival in Orlando, Florida. In Motion, Copeland's second full-length album, was released on March 22, 2005. It was produced by Matt Goldman and Aaron Marsh, and mixed by Ken Andrews. The early copies of In Motion included a four-song acoustic EP (a compilation of lo-fi versions of songs from In Motion itself), as well as "Beneath Medicine Tree".

=== 2006 to 2008 ===
Beneath Medicine Tree has a heavy medical theme. Aaron Marsh stated that the lyrics in this album were inspired by the hospitalization of his girlfriend and the death of his grandmother. The album booklet includes photographs of hospital scenes by then-bass guitarist James Likeness. Marsh says that, "With Beneath Medicine Tree, I wanted to make a record that moves people," while "With In Motion, I wanted to make a record that makes people move."

The lead singer, Marsh, has appeared with other bands such as the Morning Of on their album The Way I Fell In, Underoath on their album They're Only Chasing Safety, Anberlin on their album Cities and Lydia on their album Illuminate.

Columbia Records announced their signing of Copeland in a press release dated November 14, 2006. The band announced that they had officially left the label on September 6, 2007.

On July 18, 2007, James Likeness announced his decision to no longer be a part of Copeland. He cited pursuing a career as a graphic designer (a field in which he has a college degree) as a chief reason in his decision.

About a year after Eat, Sleep, Repeat, they released Dressed Up & in Line on November 20, 2007. It is composed of B-sides, remixes and rarities.

A year afterwards, in 2008, Copeland released their final album, You Are My Sunshine under Tooth & Nail Records. The band then decided to split up, holding the Farewell Tour before they ended.

=== 2014: Reunion, Ixora and Blushing ===
The band's fifth studio album, Ixora, was released in November 2014. Marsh, who produced at his Lakeland, Florida, studio, The Vanguard Room, reunited with Bryan Laurenson, Stephen Laurenson and Jonathan Bucklew for the album. This was followed by the release of Blushing on February 14, 2019.

== Christianity ==
Although claimed by some to be a Christian band, Marsh has said that they are not. He said, "It's not our nature to have religious connotations. We are not a ministry band. We have some people in the band that are Christians, but that is not a focus of our band." "We have no agenda in our band other than art."

== Band members ==
Current members

- Aaron Marsh – lead vocals, keyboards, piano, rhythm guitar (2001–2010, 2014–present), bass guitar (2007–2010, 2014–present)
- Bryan Laurenson – lead guitar (2001–2010, 2014–present)
- Stephen Laurenson – rhythm guitar, keyboards, piano, synthesizer, programming (2014–present; touring 2006–2010)

Current touring musicians

- Drew Stoutenburg – drums (2022–present)
- Trey Stanley – bass guitar (2025–present)

Former members

- James Likeness – bass guitar, backing vocals, acoustic guitar (2001–2007)
- Thomas Blair – rhythm guitar (2001)
- Rusty Fuller – drums (2001–2004)
- Jonathan Bucklew – drums (2005–2010, 2014–2015)

Former touring musicians

- Bobby Walker – bass guitar, backing vocals (2014–2021)
- Jordan Butcher – drums (2015–2021)

== Other projects ==
- Copeland was involved with the charity To Write Love on Her Arms.
- Marsh was involved with the band Anchor & Braille along with Anberlin's Stephen Christian, producing the band's first album Felt, which was released on August 4, 2009.
- As of 2010, Marsh is involved with a new project called The Lulls In Traffic.
- Bryan Laurenson's first band was Last Kid Picked, from Annapolis, Maryland.
- In 2009, Bryan and Stephen Laurenson formed a band, States, with Mindy White (previously of Lydia).
- In 2022, Copeland performed in the Caverns (Pelham, TN) with the Sewanee Symphony Orchestra.

== Discography ==
=== Studio albums ===
- Beneath Medicine Tree (2003)
- In Motion (2005) No. 115 US
- Eat, Sleep, Repeat (2006) No. 90 US
- You Are My Sunshine (2008) No. 48 US
- Ixora (2014) No. 93 US
- Blushing (2019)

=== Compilations ===
- Dressed Up & in Line (2007)
- Revolving Doors (2022)

=== EPs ===
- Know Nothing Stays the Same (2004)
- Sony Connect Sessions (2005) - a bonus disc with the initial copies of In Motion
- Best Buy Exclusive Bonus Disc (2006) - included with the initial copies of Eat, Sleep, Repeat that were sold at Best Buy
- The Grey Man EP (February 24, 2009)

=== Splits ===
- Copeland & Pacifico (2001)
- The Pale/Copeland (2003)

=== Instant live ===
Copeland teamed up with Instant Live to create a series of 21 limited edition CDs of many of the band's shows during their tour with Daphne Loves Derby, The Spill Canvas and Melee, between October 13 and November 7, 2005.

=== Compilation appearances ===
- From Brooklyn with Love (2001)
- Stepping Stone Volume 1 (2002)
- Take Action Volume 3 (2003)
- Hello. We Are the Militia Group (2004)
- Maybe This Christmas Tree (2004)
- Happy Christmas Vol. 4 (2005)
- ¡Policia!: A Tribute to the Police (2005)
- Punk Goes 90's (2006)
- The Mother of Invention (2009)
- Happy Christmas Vol. 5 (2010)

=== Covers ===
Punk Goes 90s:

- "Black Hole Sun" by Soundgarden

Policia! A Tribute to the Police:

- "Every Breath You Take" by The Police

Know Nothing Stays the Same (EP):

- "Another Day in Paradise" by Phil Collins
- "Coming Around Again" by Carly Simon
- "She's Always a Woman" by Billy Joel
- "Take My Breath Away" by Berlin
- "Part-Time Lover" by Stevie Wonder

You Are My Sunshine (Deluxe Edition):

- "You Are My Sunshine"

Friends of P - Tribute to the Rentals:

- "Getting By" by The Rentals

The Mother of Invention:

- "The Tears of a Child" by Vincent Dooly

Happy Christmas Vol. 4:

- "Do You Hear What I Hear?"

Happy Christmas Vol. 5:

- "Have Yourself a Merry Little Christmas"

=== Singles ===
- Beneath Medicine Tree
  - "Walking Downtown"
- In Motion
  - "Pin Your Wings"
- Eat, Sleep, Repeat
  - "Control Freak"
- You Are My Sunshine
  - "The Grey Man"
- Ixora
  - "Ordinary"
  - "Erase"
- Blushing
  - "Pope"
  - "Night Figures"
