= Universal Motown Republic Group =

Umbrella label founded by Universal Music Group (1999–2011)

- Parent company: Universal Music Group
- Founded: 1999; 27 years ago
- Founder: Universal Music Group
- Defunct: 2011; 15 years ago
- Status: Defunct
- Distributor: Self-distributed (in the US); The Island Def Jam Music Group (outside the US)
- Genre: Various
- Country of origin: United States
- Location: New York City
- Official website: umrg.com

Universal Motown Republic Group (UMRG) was an umbrella label founded in 1999 by Universal Music Group to oversee the labels assigned to its unit. UMRG was formed in 1999 by pooling together Universal Records, Motown Records, and Republic Records, but which gave way to the current incarnations of those labels at the time, Universal Motown Records and Universal Republic Records.

Universal Motown Republic Group was one of the three Universal Music Group umbrella units in North America to deal primarily with mainstream pop, rock, and urban performers; the others being: The Island Def Jam Music Group and Interscope-Geffen-A&M. Barry Weiss was chairman and CEO of the company. In the summer of 2011, changes were made at the Universal Motown Republic Group umbrella: Motown Records was separated from Universal Motown Records (causing it to shut down and transfer its artists to either Motown Records or Universal Republic Records) and the umbrella label and merged into The Island Def Jam Music Group, making Universal Republic Records a stand-alone label and shutting down Universal Motown Republic Group.

== Current Universal Motown Republic Group labels ==
=== Universal Motown Records ===
- Casablanca Records
- Cash Money Records
  - Young Money Entertainment
- SRC Records
  - Loud Records
- Rowdy Records
- Custard Records
- Ecstatic Peace!
- Derrty Entertainment

=== Universal Republic Records ===
- Casablanca Records
- Republic Nashville
- Next Plateau Entertainment
- Chamillitary Entertainment
- Serjical Strike Records
- Tuff Gong
- Brushfire Records
- Lava Records
- ANTI-
