= Death Wish (film series) =

American action-crime-drama film series

- Directed by: Michael Winner (1–3); J. Lee Thompson (4); Allan A. Goldstein (5); Eli Roth (Remake)
- Screenplay by: Wendell Mayes (1); David Engelbach (2); Don Jakoby (3); Gail Morgan Hickman (4); Allan A. Goldstein (5); Joe Carnahan (Remake)
- Based on: Death Wish by Brian Garfield
- Starring: Charles Bronson (1–5); Vincent Gardenia (1–2); Hope Lange (1); Kathleen Tolan (1); Christopher Guest (1); William Redfield (1); Jill Ireland (2); Vincent Gardenia (2); J. D. Cannon (2); Paul Lambert (2); Anthony Franciosa (2); Robin Sherwood (2); Deborah Raffin (3); Ed Lauter (3); Martin Balsam (3); Francis Drake (3); Joe Gonzalez (3); Kay Lenz (4); John P. Ryan (4); Perry Lopez (4); Danny Trejo (4); Soon-Tek Oh (4); George Dickerson (4); Lesley-Anne Down (5); Michael Parks (5); Robert Joy (5); Saul Rubinek (5); Kenneth Welsh (5); Bruce Willis (Remake); Vincent D'Onofrio (Remake); Elisabeth Shue (Remake); Camila Morrone (Remake); Dean Norris (Remake); Beau Knapp (Remake)
- Production companies: Dino De Laurentiis Corporation (1974); The Cannon Group Inc./American-European Productions (1982–1987); City Films (1982); Golan-Globus Productions (1982–1985); Lander-Roberts Productions (1982); 21st Century Film Corporation (1994); Cave 76 (2018)
- Distributed by: Paramount Pictures (1974); Columbia Pictures (1974–1982); Filmways Pictures (1982); The Cannon Group Inc. (1985–1987); Trimark Pictures (1994); Metro-Goldwyn-Mayer (2018; also as a current distributor for the original sequels from 1982–1994)
- Release dates: 1974 (Death Wish); 1982 (Death Wish II); 1985 (Death Wish 3); 1987 (Death Wish 4: The Crackdown); 1994 (Death Wish V: The Face of Death); 2018 (Death Wish)
- Country: United States
- Language: English
- Budget: Total (6 films): $61 million
- Box office: Total (6 films): $87.2 million

The Death Wish franchise is an American vigilante action-thriller film series based on the 1972 novel by Brian Garfield. The films follow the character Paul Kersey, portrayed by Charles Bronson in the original series, and Bruce Willis in the 2018 remake. While the first film received mixed reviews, the subsequent sequels, as well as the remake, were panned by critics. The series made $87 million against a combined production budget of $61 million. Charles Bronson was the only actor to have appeared in all five films.

== Background ==
=== Paul Kersey ===
Kersey was born in East Philadelphia, Pennsylvania in 1921. Kersey's father was an English-American who originated from Northern England and his mother comes from Provo, Utah. Kersey's Norman English ancestor, Pierre Whítmoré Keèrsye, anglicized his surname to Kersey. Paul was raised around guns and became a good shot as a child. After Paul's father was killed in a hunting accident, his mother prevented him from being around guns anymore.

Kersey served in World War II in the Pacific theater as a combat medic from 1944 to 1945. In 1950 Paul graduated from Princeton University with a Bachelor of Science degree in Civil Engineering. In 1953, he was a conscientious objector in the medical corps in the Korean War. In the late 1950s, he traveled to New York City to settle down.

== Films ==
Film	U.S. release date	Director(s)	Screenwriter(s)	Story by	Producer(s)
Original series
Death Wish	July 24, 1974	Michael Winner	Wendell Mayes	—N/a	Dino De Laurentiis, Hal Landers & Bobby Roberts
Death Wish II	February 19, 1982	Michael Winner	David Engelbach	—N/a	Menahem Golan & Yoram Globus
Death Wish 3	November 1, 1985	Michael Winner	Don Jakoby	—N/a	Menahem Golan, Yoram Globus & Michael Winner
Death Wish 4: The Crackdown	November 6, 1987	J. Lee Thompson	Gail Morgan Hickman	—N/a	Pancho Kohner
Death Wish V: The Face of Death	January 14, 1994	Allan A. Goldstein	Allan A. Goldstein	—N/a	Damian Lee
Remake
Death Wish	March 2, 2018	Eli Roth	Joe Carnahan	—N/a	Roger Birnbaum

=== Death Wish (1974) ===
Paul Kersey is an architect who served in the Korean War in the medical corps, and he lives in New York City. One day, three street punks posing as grocery delivery boys break into his apartment while he is at work. They beat up Paul's wife, Joanna, and rape his married daughter, Carol Toby, spray-painting both of them and the wall of their apartment "just for fun". Joanna later dies of her injuries, and Carol is left catatonic. Paul's life is ripped apart by this attack.

Paul's boss decides that Paul needs to get out of New York for a while, so he sends him to Tucson, Arizona, to meet a client. There, Paul witnesses a mock gunfight at Old Tucson Studios, a reconstructed Western frontier town that is often used as a movie set. Paul's client gets him interested in guns. It turns out that Paul grew up around guns and is a good shot himself. When Paul returns to New York, he discovers that his client has put a .32 Colt Police Positive revolver into his baggage as a gift. When the police are unable to find the rapists, Paul sets out to find them himself. Paul begins patrolling the streets, killing street criminals as he encounters them.

=== Death Wish II (1982) ===
Kersey and his daughter Carol, who is still catatonic, now live in Los Angeles because Paul accepted a deal from the New York City Police Department to leave town so they would not tell anyone that he was the vigilante. Paul now has a new woman in his life, KABC news reporter Geri Nichols. One day, while he is out with Carol and Geri, he is mugged by a gang of five punks. Paul fights back, but they get away.

The muggers go to his house, and gag, rape, and murder Kersey's housekeeper. They then wait for Paul to return home and knock him unconscious, and kidnap and rape Carol. The assault brings her out of her coma and she tries to get away by jumping through the second story window, but she dies when she is impaled on an iron fence stake.

Beside himself with grief and rage, Paul dedicates his life to avenging Carol. He rents a ratty hotel room under another name, and starts looking for the rapists. When the Los Angeles Police Department deduces that they have a vigilante on their hands, they decide to consult the New York City Police Department, who fear that Kersey is killing criminals again.

=== Death Wish 3 (1985) ===
After killing criminals in Los Angeles, Paul Kersey returns to New York City to visit his friend Charley, who lives in one of the worst parts of New York City. When Paul arrives at Charley's apartment, he finds Charley dying after a vicious beating by a gang led by Manny Fraker. The police enter the apartment and find Paul standing over Charley's body.

Paul is arrested for the murder, but police chief Richard S. Shriker offers a deal: Paul can kill all the criminals he wants, if he keeps the cops informed about the death count. Though Kersey says that he stopped his mugger slayings, Shriker releases Paul to go after Fraker. Paul moves into Charley's apartment in a decaying building in the middle of a bombed-out gang war zone.

=== Death Wish 4: The Crackdown (1987) ===
Kersey had largely retired from slaying muggers shortly after Death Wish 3. In Death Wish 4: The Crackdown, Detective Phil Nozaki mentions mugger shootings downtown two years previous to the events of Death Wish 4, to which Detective Sid Reiner responds by saying that "the vigilante retired years ago". Kersey kept regular residence in Los Angeles, regardless of his breaking off his mugger slayings. Paul Kersey is back in Los Angeles, and is dating reporter Karen Sheldon, who has a teenage daughter named Erica. While Erica is at an arcade with her boyfriend, Randy, she dies of a crack cocaine overdose, setting the scene for a departure from the series' focus on sexual assault by instead putting drug abuse center stage. Later, Randy goes back to the arcade with Kersey following him.

Randy confronts Jo-Jo Ross, the dealer that Erica got the crack from. Randy tells Jo-Jo that he is going to the police, but Jo-Jo kills him to keep him quiet. Kersey shows up and shoots Jo-Jo with a .380 Walther PPK pistol, and watches him land on the roof of the bumper-car ride, where he is electrocuted. Next, Paul gets a note and a phone call from a publisher named Nathan White, who tells him that he knows about the death of Jo-Jo. Nathan explains to Kersey that his daughter had died of an overdose, so he wants to hire Kersey to wipe out the drug trade in L.A. – and in particular to target Ed Zacharias and the Romero Brothers Jack and Tony, rival drug kingpins who are the city's two main drug suppliers.

=== Death Wish V: The Face of Death (1994) ===
Kersey's secret identity as the vigilante was in effect blown in Death Wish 4: The Crackdown, as Detective Sid Reiner of the Los Angeles Police Department, less sympathetic than Chief Richard Shriker or Detective Frank Ochoa, discovered it. Reiner stated he would arrest Kersey. Kersey retired and entered the Witness Protection Program and assumed the alias Paul Stewart in New York City after meeting the District Attorney.

Seven years passed before Kersey's peace was again interrupted. New York City's garment district has turned into Dodge City when a mobster named Tommy O'Shea muscles in on the fashion trade of his ex-wife, Olivia Regent. Olivia is engaged to Paul, who provides a sense of security for her and her daughter, Chelsea. Olivia is not impressed when Tommy tortures her manager, Big Al, so Tommy hires an enforcer named Freddie Flakes, a master of disguise.

Freddie dons women's clothing to follow Olivia into a ladies' room, where he smashes her face into a mirror, causing permanent disfigurement. In the offices of District Attorney Brian Hoyle and his associate Hector Vasquez, Paul and Olivia vow that Tommy should be prosecuted. Later, Freddie and two of his henchmen disguise themselves as cops, infiltrate Olivia's apartment, and shoot her dead. This causes Kersey to go from his retirement to his vigilante efforts yet again, as he tries to wipe out Tommy's ruthless Irish mob organization by killing all of his gang members responsible for Olivia's murder and, in the process, Kersey kills his wife's assailants as well.

=== Death Wish (2018) ===
Paul Kersey (Bruce Willis), a Chicago-area Emergency Room surgeon, lives with his wife, Lucy (Elisabeth Shue), and daughter, Jordan (Camila Morrone). When the family visits a restaurant with Paul's brother Frank (Vincent D'Onofrio), a valet named Miguel photographs their home address from their car's navigation software, after hearing about a night they plan to be away from home. However, Paul is called to work that night, and Jordan and Lucy are home when the three armed burglars break into their home. Moments later, one of the burglars is scarred from Lucy and Jordan's efforts to fight back in defense of their lives and home. The invading criminals shoot Lucy dead, and Jordan is seriously wounded and comatose from the attempted murder.

Paul becomes frustrated with the lack of police progress on the case, led by Detectives Kevin Raines (Dean Norris) and Leonore Jackson (Kimberly Elise). After seeing two men harassing a woman, Paul tries to intervene but is kicked and punched to the ground by the two assailants. He visits a gun store, but there is a long mandatory waiting period to purchase a firearm legally. When a gang member is brought to the hospital and his Glock 17 falls off the gurney, Paul takes it and practices shooting.

He uses the gun to stop a carjacking, a video of which goes viral. During the effort, he cuts his left hand owing to improperly handling the pistol. Continuing his efforts as a vigilante, Paul decides to kill a drug dealer, calling himself "the Ice Cream Man", after a young boy comes to the hospital with a gunshot wound in his leg. Paul calmly walks up to the pistol-holding drug dealer, referring to himself as "his last customer", and shoots him. News, TV, and radio reports consistently demonstrate mixed feelings of support and condemnation of Paul's developing war against violent criminals.

== Cast and crew ==
=== Cast ===
List indicator
- This table shows the principal characters and the actors who have portrayed them throughout the franchise.
- A dark grey cell indicates the character was not in the film, or that the character's presence in the film has not yet been announced.

Character	Original series					Remake
Character	Death Wish	Death Wish II	Death Wish 3	Death Wish 4: The Crackdown	Death Wish V: The Face of Death	Death Wish
Character	1974	1982	1985	1987	1994	2018
Paul Kersey The Vigilante	Charles Bronson	Charles Bronson	Charles Bronson	Charles Bronson	Charles Bronson	Bruce Willis
Lt. Frank Ochoa Frank Kersey	Vincent Gardenia	Vincent Gardenia	Mentioned	Mentioned	Mentioned	Vincent D'Onofrio
Carol Kersey-Toby Jordan Kersey	Kathleen Tolan	Robin Sherwood	Mentioned	Mentioned	Mentioned	Camila Morrone
Joanna Kersey Lucy Kersey	Hope Lange	Mentioned	Mentioned	Mentioned	Mentioned	Elisabeth Shue
Jackson Reilly / Lenore Jackson	Christopher Guest					Kimberly Elise
Freak #1 / Knox	Jeff Goldblum					Beau Knapp
Samuel "Sam" Kreutzer	William Redfield					
Jack Toby	Steven Keats					
Ames Jainchill	Stuart Margolin					
Police Commissioner	Stephen Elliott					
Hank	Jack Wallace					
Joe Charles	Robert Kya-Hill					
PO Gemetti (Task Force Meeting)	Olympia Dukakis					
Cop at Hospital	Paul Dooley					
Subway Mugger	Eric Laneuville					
Park Mugger	Lawrence Hilton-Jacobs					
Grocery Clerk	Sonia Manzano					
E.R. Doctor	Tom Hayden					
Moving Man	Ciro "Jerry" Palazzo					
Kersey's Secretary	Marcia Jean Kurtz					
Security Guard in Lobby	Al Lewis					
Mugger	Robert Miano					
Slasher Mugger	John Herzfeld					
Central Park Mugger	Lawrence Hilton-Jacobs					
Supermarket Checkout Clerk	Sonia Manzano					
Alma Lee Brown	Helen Martin					
Receptionist	Marcia Jean Kurtz					
Geri Nichols		Jill Ireland				
New York District Attorney		J.D. Cannon				
LA Police Commissioner		Anthony Franciosa				
Donald Kay		Charles Cyphers				
Inspector Lt. Mankiewicz		Ben Frank				
Senator Robert McLean		Paul Comi				
Elliot Cass		Michael Prince				
Charles Wilson Nirvana		Thomas F. Duffy				
Cutter		Laurence Fishburne III				
Stomper		Kevyn Major Howard				
Jiver		Stuart K. Robinson				
Punkcut		E. Lamont Johnson				
Rosario		Silvana Gallardo				
Fred McKenzie		Robert F. Lyons				
Judge Lake		Frank Campanella				
Mike		Don Dubbins				
Charles Pearce		Buck Young				
Kathryn Davis			Deborah Raffin			
Police Chief Richard Shriker			Ed Lauter			
Bennett Cross			Martin Balsam			
Manny Fraker			Gavan O'Herlihy			
Hermosa			Alex Winter			
Maria Rodriguez			Marina Sirtis			
The Cuban			Ricco Ross			
Manny Fraker's Girlfriend			Barbie Wilde			
Captain Sterns			Manning Redwood			
Karen Sheldon				Kay Lenz		
Nathan White				John P. Ryan		
Ed Zacharias				Perry Lopez		
Reiner				George Dickerson		
Nozaki				Soon-Tek Oh		
Erica Sheldon				Dana Barron		
Art Sanella				Danny Trejo		
Jesse				Tim Russ		
Punk				Mark Pellegrino		
Olivia Regent					Lesley-Anne Down	
Tommy O'Shea					Michael Parks	
Freddie "Flakes" Garrity					Robert Joy	
Subway Mugger / D.A. Brian Hoyle	Saul Rubinek				Saul Rubinek	
Lt. Mickey King					Kenneth Welsh	
Janice Omori					Lisa Inouye	
Lt. Hector Vasquez					Miguel Sandoval	
Chelsea					Erica Lancaster	
Sal Paconi					Chuck Shamata	
Chicki Paconi					Kevin Lund	
Runway Model					Melissa Illes	
Albert					Jefferson Mappin	
Maxine					Claire Rankin	
Detective Kevin Raines						Dean Norris
Sophie						Stephanie Janusauskas
The Fish						Jack Kesy
Joe						Ronnie Gene Blevins
Ben						Len Cariou
Bethany						Kirby Bliss Blanton
Dr. Jill Klavens						Wendy Crewson

=== Crew ===
Crew/detail	Film					
Crew/detail	Death Wish	Death Wish II	Death Wish 3	Death Wish 4: The Crackdown	Death Wish V: The Face of Death	Death Wish
Crew/detail	1974	1982	1985	1987	1994	2018
Director	Michael Winner	Michael Winner	Michael Winner	J. Lee Thompson	Allan A. Goldstein	Eli Roth
Producer(s)	Dino De Laurentiis; Hal Landers; Bobby Roberts	Menahem Golan; Yoram Globus	Menahem Golan; Yoram Globus; Michael Winner	Poncho Kohner	Damian Lee	Roger Birnbaum
Writer(s)	Wendell Mayes	David Engelbach	Don Jakoby (as Michael Edmonds)	Gail Morgan Hickman	Michael Colleary; Allan A. Goldstein	Joe Carnahan
Composer	Herbie Hancock	Jimmy Page	Jimmy Page; Mike Moran	John Bisharat; Paul MacCallum; Valentine MacCallum; Robert O. Ragland	Terry Plumeri	Ludwig Göransson
Editor(s)	Bernard Gribble	Michael Winner; Julian Semilian	Arnold Crust	Peter Lee-Thompson	Patrick Rand	Mark Goldblatt
Cinematographer	Arthur J. Ornitz	Thomas Del Ruth; Richard H. Kline	John Stanier	Gideon Porath	Curtis Petersen	Rogier Stoffers
Production company	Dino De Laurentiis Corporation	The Cannon Group, Inc. Golan-Globus Productions	The Cannon Group, Inc. Golan-Globus Productions	The Cannon Group, Inc.	21st Century Film Corporation; Death Wish 5 Productions	Cave 76; Metro-Goldwyn-Mayer
Distributor	Paramount Pictures; Columbia Pictures	Filmways Pictures; Columbia Pictures	Cannon Film Distributors	Cannon Film Distributors	Trimark Pictures	Annapurna Pictures; Metro-Goldwyn-Mayer
Running time	94 minutes	88 minutes	92 minutes	99 minutes	95 minutes	108 minutes
Release date	July 24, 1974	February 19, 1982	November 1, 1985	November 6, 1987	January 14, 1994	March 2, 2018

== Reception ==
=== Box office performance ===
Film	U.S. release date	Budget	Box office revenue		
Film	U.S. release date	Budget	United States	International	Worldwide
Death Wish	July 24, 1974	$3.7 million	$20.3–$22 million		$20.3–$22 million
Death Wish 2	February 19, 1982	$8 million	$29 million		$29 million
Death Wish 3	November 1, 1985	$9–10 million	$16.1 million		$16.1 million
Death Wish 4: The Crackdown	November 6, 1987	$5 million	$6.9 million		$6.9 million
Death Wish V: The Face of Death	January 14, 1994	$5 million	$1.7 million		$1.7 million
Death Wish	March 2, 2018	$30 million	$34 million	$15.6 million	$49.6 million
Total					

=== Critical and public response ===
Film	Rotten Tomatoes	Metacritic
Death Wish	66% (32 reviews)	51 (7 reviews)
Death Wish II	35% (17 reviews)	11 (7 reviews)
Death Wish 3	11% (18 reviews)	18 (9 reviews)
Death Wish 4: The Crackdown	14% (7 reviews)	46 (6 reviews)
Death Wish V: The Face of Death	0% (5 reviews)	25 (6 reviews)
Death Wish	17% (136 reviews)	31 (32 reviews)

=== Analysis ===
In 2006, film historian Paul Talbot released Bronson's Loose!: The Making of the Death Wish Films, which covers the making of the five films and features interviews with author Brian Garfield, director Michael Winner, producers Bobby Roberts and Pancho Kohner, and more.

In 2010, novelist Christopher Sorrentino published a book-length monograph, called Death Wish, on the original film. In the course of a deep analysis of the film's content, Sorrentino declares Death Wish to be mythic and apolitical, and using The New York Times's Vincent Canby as a prime example, holds it up as an instance when reviewers used a film's perceived political incorrectness as a pretext to savage it.

== Music ==
=== Soundtracks ===
Title	U.S. release date	Length	Composer(s)	Label
Death Wish: Original Soundtrack Recording	October 11, 1974	40:28	Herbie Hancock	Columbia
Death Wish II: The Original Soundtrack - Music by Jimmy Page	February 15, 1982	37:11	Jimmy Page	Swan Song
Death Wish 3: Original Motion Picture Soundtrack				
Death Wish 4: The Crackdown (Original Motion Picture Soundtrack)				
Death Wish V: The Face of Death (Original Motion Picture Soundtrack)				
Death Wish: Original Motion Picture Soundtrack				

== Other media ==
=== Video game ===
The third film in the original series was made into a video game of the same name by Gremlin Graphics for the ZX Spectrum, Commodore 64, MSX and Amstrad CPC. In the game, the player controls Paul Kersey in the streets and buildings in a free-roaming, all-out gunfight with gangsters. It was one of the goriest games of its time, featuring multiple weapons with detailed, different damage patterns and the possibility to kill civilians.

=== Film based on novel's sequel ===
The 2007 film Death Sentence was based loosely on the Death Wish novel's 1975 sequel of the same name. The film stars Kevin Bacon as Nick Hume, a man who takes the law into his own hands when his son is murdered by a gang as an initiation ritual.

=== In popular culture ===
In 2020, the pseudonymous author "Paul Kersey", who had published numerous anti-black articles on white nationalist blogs and websites, was identified as Michael J. Thompson, a longtime employee at several mainstream conservative organizations. Thompson chose his pen name in reference to the films' protagonist.
