= Death Wish (2018 film) =

American action thriller film by Eli Roth

- Theatrical release poster
- Directed by: Eli Roth
- Screenplay by: Joe Carnahan
- Based on: Death Wish (1974 film) by Wendell Mayes; Death Wish (novel) by Brian Garfield
- Produced by: Roger Birnbaum
- Starring: Bruce Willis; Vincent D'Onofrio; Elisabeth Shue; Dean Norris; Kimberly Elise
- Cinematography: Rogier Stoffers
- Edited by: Mark Goldblatt
- Music by: Ludwig Göransson
- Production companies: Metro-Goldwyn-Mayer Pictures; Cave 76 Productions
- Distributed by: Metro-Goldwyn-Mayer Pictures
- Release date: March 2, 2018
- Running time: 107 minutes
- Country: United States
- Language: English
- Budget: $30 million
- Box office: $55.9 million

Death Wish is a 2018 American vigilante action-thriller film directed by Eli Roth, written by Joe Carnahan, and produced by Roger Birnbaum. A remake of the 1974 film and the sixth installment in the Death Wish film series. It stars Bruce Willis as Dr. Paul Kersey, a Chicago-based surgeon who sets out to exact vengeance on the culprits responsible for attacking his family. Vincent D'Onofrio, Elisabeth Shue, Dean Norris and Kimberly Elise appear in supporting roles.

Death Wish was released in North America by Metro-Goldwyn-Mayer Pictures on March 2, 2018. The film was grossed $55.9 million worldwide against a $30 million budget. It received negative reviews from critics, who criticized the script and graphic violence, took issue with its depiction of gun violence in light of then-recent mass shootings and alleged that it spread right-wing and pro-gun messages. However, the action sequences, Roth's direction and Willis's performance were praised.

== Plot ==
Paul Kersey, a trauma surgeon, lives with his wife Lucy and daughter Jordan in Chicago. When the family visits a restaurant with Paul's brother Frank, a valet parking attendant named Miguel notes their address after hearing they plan to stay out. When Paul is paged to the hospital, Jordan and Lucy return home earlier than expected. They encounter three armed criminals inside the house, Lucy is shot and Jordan sustains a head injury when they try to fight back. Lucy dies from her injuries and Jordan survives in a coma.

Paul, frustrated by lack of police progress on the case, contemplates purchasing a firearm, then takes one from an injured gang member brought to the hospital. Paul practices with it and uses it to stop a carjacking, injuring his left hand in the process. A viral video of the carjacking earns Paul the nickname Grim Reaper. After treating a boy who was attacked for refusing to sell drugs for a drug dealer called "Ice Cream Man", Paul shoots the dealer in broad daylight.

News reports demonstrate divided opinions on Paul's developing war against violent criminals. After Paul recognizes a dying Miguel on his operating table wearing a watch stolen from his house, he hacks into Miguel's phone and obtains the address of a liquor store that fences stolen goods. Paul confronts the owner, Ponytail, who summons another criminal, Fish, by text. Fish sneaks in but accidentally kills Ponytail while trying to shoot Paul. Fish names the second member of the group, Joe, before Paul kills him.

Police visit Paul to discuss the case and Paul destroys the dead men's phones. Paul finds Joe at an auto body shop and tortures him into confessing the third robber, Knox, murdered Lucy. Paul kills Joe and meets Knox in a nightclub bathroom, where they exchange fire and wound each other. Knox goes to the police and gives them a physical description of Paul.

Paul is confronted at home by Frank, before detectives arrive and question him about his brother's whereabouts. The hospital Paul to report Jordan has regained consciousness. A week later, Paul encounters Knox in the elevator as he's taking Jordan from the hospital. Knox inadvertently reveals to Paul he's the guy he exchanged gunshots with at the nightclub. Knowing Knox will eventually come for him and Jordan, Paul buys weapons for self-defence. When Knox and his men come to the house, Paul orders Jordan to hide and call the police, then kills Knox's men before being shot and wounded by Knox. He kills Knox with a hidden rifle, and the police side with him after he suggests he's done with vigilantism.

Months later, Paul drops off Jordan at New York University, where he spots a person stealing a bag from a bellhop. Paul calls out the person and points a finger gun at him.

== Cast ==
- Bruce Willis as Paul Kersey
- Vincent D'Onofrio as Frank Kersey
- Elisabeth Shue as Lucy Kersey
- Dean Norris as Detective Kevin Raines
- Beau Knapp as Knox
- Kimberly Elise as Detective Leonore Jackson
- Camila Morrone as Jordan Kersey
- Jack Kesy as The Fish
- Ronnie Gene Blevins as Joe
- Kirby Bliss Blanton as Bethany
- Mike Epps as Dr. Chris Salgado (Uncredited)

== Production ==
=== Development ===
Development on the film began in 2006, when Sylvester Stallone announced that he would be directing and starring in a remake of Death Wish (1974). Stallone told Ain't It Cool News, "Instead of the Charles Bronson character being an architect, my version would have him as a very good cop who had incredible success without ever using his gun. So when the attack on his family happens, he's really thrown into a moral dilemma in proceeding to carry out his revenge." He later told the publication that he was no longer involved after "creative differences" and became busy with work on other projects.

In a 2009 interview with MTV, Stallone stated that he was again considering the project. In late January 2012, The Hollywood Reporter confirmed that a remake would be written and directed by Joe Carnahan. The film was originally set to star Liam Neeson and Frank Grillo. Carnahan too left the project in February 2013 due to "creative differences", but received sole writing credit for the completed film. He was replaced as director with Gerardo Naranjo, who was interested in casting Benicio Del Toro in the lead role; this version also never came to fruition.

=== Casting ===
After the completed script lay dormant for three years, it was brought back up in March 2016, when Metro-Goldwyn-Mayer Pictures (MGM) announced that Aharon Keshales and Navot Papushado would direct the film. Willis was chosen for the role of Paul Kersey. Others that were considered for the role were Russell Crowe, Matt Damon, Will Smith, Brad Pitt, Liam Neeson, Kurt Russell, Michael Keaton, Christopher Lambert, Dennis Quaid, Richard Gere, Mel Gibson, Harrison Ford, Don Johnson, Peter Weller, Ron Perlman, Stephen Lang, Michael Biehn, Tommy Lee Jones, Jeff Bridges and Arnold Schwarzenegger.

In May, Keshales and Papushado quit the project after MGM declined to allow them to rewrite Joe Carnahan's original script, which had been approved by Willis. In June, Eli Roth signed on to direct, with the script being rewritten by Scott Alexander and Larry Karaszewski. On August 25, 2016, Vincent D'Onofrio was cast alongside Willis to play Paul Kersey's brother, while Dean Norris also joined the film. On October 7, 2016, Kimberly Elise and Camila Morrone were cast in the film to play Detective Jackson and Jordan Kersey. Later on October 17, 2016, Ronnie Gene Blevins was cast in the film.

=== Filming ===
Principal photography began in September 2016 in Chicago, Illinois. In October 2016, filming began in Montreal, Quebec, Canada.

== Release ==
In June 2017, it was announced that Annapurna Pictures would distribute Death Wish on behalf of MGM, and release it on November 22, 2017. In October 2017, it was announced that the film's release was being delayed until March 2, 2018, which MGM would instead distribute; through a joint-venture with Annapurna, the latter's marketing and distribution team contributed with financing and campaigning. (Note: Death Wish is the first film released by MGM through their joint distribution venture with Annapurna (later rebranded as United Artists Releasing). It is also the first film distributed by MGM since Hot Tub Time Machine (2010), as well as the first film to be exclusively credited to MGM since The Other End of the Line (2008).)

== Reception ==
=== Box office ===
Death Wish grossed $34.9 million in the United States and Canada and $21 million in other countries; worldwide, it grossed $55.9 million. The film's budget was $30 million.

In the United States and Canada, Death Wish was released alongside Red Sparrow, and was projected to gross $10–20 million from 2,847 theaters in its opening weekend. It made $4.2 million on its first day (including $650,000 from Thursday night previews) and $13 million in its opening weekend, finishing third behind Black Panther ($66.7 million in its third week) and Red Sparrow ($17 million). 55% of its audience was male, while 89% was over the age of 25. It dropped 49% to $6.6 million in its second weekend, finishing at 7th.

=== Critical response ===
I wanted to really make it about family, and stick to the central issue of what would you do if this happened to your family? The movie for me really is about family and protecting your family and what do you do when you can't get justice for your family? It's not pro-gun. What I really try to do more than anything is show it how it really is, and leave it for the audience to decide.

— Eli Roth on the reception of Death Wish

Death Wish received largely negative reviews from critics. On review aggregation website Rotten Tomatoes, the film holds an approval rating of 17% based on 161 reviews and an average rating of 4.1/10. The website's critical consensus reads, "Death Wish is little more than a rote retelling that lacks the grit and conviction of the original—and also suffers from spectacularly bad timing." On Metacritic, the film has a weighted average score of 31 out of 100, based on 32 critics, indicating "generally unfavorable" reviews. Audiences polled by CinemaScore gave the film an average grade of "B+" on an A+ to F scale.

The Chicago Sun-Times's Richard Roeper gave the film 2 out of 4 stars, writing, "Even with the social commentary, Death Wish isn't trying to be some intense, gritty, ripped-from-the-headlines docudrama ... A number of gruesome scenes are staged like something out of one of those Final Destination movies, with a bowling ball, a dart, a wrench and other conveniently handy items used as weapons of singular destruction. It's essentially revenge porn." Michael Phillips of the Chicago Tribune gave the film 1 out of 4 stars and said, "For a while, director Roth plays this stuff relatively straight, and Willis periodically reminds us he can act (the grieving Kersey cries a fair bit here). The script contains a reference to AR-15 rifles; by the end, Willis goes full Willis when his adversaries return to the sanctity of the family home."

Many critics noted the timing of the film's release, coming less than three weeks after the Parkland high school shooting in Parkland, Florida, alongside the positive portrayal of American gun culture. Jeannette Catsoulis of The New York Times called the film "imbecilic", and criticized its jokey tone and "morally unconflicted" approach to its subject matter. Similarly, The Guardian's Amy Nicholson criticized the film for "[flatlining] the politics and [saturating] the pathos", and for insulting both sides of the gun control argument.

The Hollywood Reporter's John DeFore noted that the film does not attempt to "use genre metaphors to address real national debates", making the original film "look philosophical by comparison", and he also noted the improbable and contrived nature of Kersey's mission. Writing for the Los Angeles Times, Justin Chang called the film "a slick, straightforward revenge thriller as well as a sham provocation, pandering shamelessly to the viewer's bloodlust while trying to pass as self-aware satire". Chang compared the film unfavorably to Death Sentence (2007), (Note: Death Sentence is a loose adaptation of the novel of the same name by Garfield; while the book is a sequel to its predecessor Death Wish, the adaptation is unrelated to the previous Death Wish films and is a standalone feature.) citing the lack of consequences that Kersey faces.

Some reviewers stood in defense of the film. Peter Howell of the Toronto Star stated that "Roth and Carnahan do an OK job updating Death Wish", and that the film accurately depicts the "casual way that Americans acquire and use guns". He felt, though, that Liam Neeson would have been a better choice for the lead role. Matthew Rozsa of Salon agreed that the film's release was timed poorly, but argued that "mass shootings have been ubiquitous for so long that I doubt there ever would have been an appropriate release date for a vigilante fantasy. ... It exists everywhere in our culture, from movies and video games to the right-wing talking points that regularly thwart gun control legislation." Rozsa considers Death Wish his guilty pleasure, recommending it as a "success" as well as "a competent popcorn muncher that moves at a brisk pace, is about as engaging as your average Law and Order episode and contains an appropriately glowering (if somewhat bored looking) Bruce Willis." The San Francisco Chronicle's Mick Lasalle called it "way better than all the Death Wish sequels" and "easily the second best Death Wish movie ever made, and not a distant second."

=== Accolades ===
39th Golden Raspberry Awards (February 23, 2019)

- Worst Actor (Bruce Willis) (nominated)
- Worst Prequel, Remake, Rip-off or Sequel (nominated)
