= Death Wish V: The Face of Death =

1994 American action thriller film by Allan A. Goldstein

- Theatrical release poster
- Directed by: Allan A. Goldstein
- Screenplay by: Allan A. Goldstein
- Story by: Michael Colleary; Allan A. Goldstein
- Based on: Characters by Brian Garfield
- Produced by: Damian Lee
- Starring: Charles Bronson; Lesley-Anne Down; Michael Parks; Saul Rubinek; Ken Welsh
- Cinematography: Curtis Petersen
- Edited by: Patrick Rand
- Music by: Terry Plumeri
- Production companies: 21st Century Film Corporation; Death Wish 5 Properties
- Distributed by: Trimark Pictures
- Release date: January 14, 1994
- Running time: 95 minutes
- Country: United States
- Language: English
- Budget: $5 million
- Box office: $1.7 million

Death Wish V: The Face of Death is a 1994 American vigilante action-thriller film, a sequel to the 1987 film Death Wish 4: The Crackdown and the fifth installment in the Death Wish film series, written and directed by Allan A. Goldstein. Charles Bronson reprises his role in both his final theatrical starring role and his final appearance as the character Paul Kersey. In the film, Kersey tries to protect his girlfriend, Olivia Regent (Lesley-Anne Down), from brutal mobsters that are threatening her fashion business. The film received negative reviews and was a box-office bomb.

== Plot ==
Seven years after Detective Sid Reiner discovered he was the vigilante, Paul Kersey returns to New York City in the witness protection program, having assumed the name Paul Stewart. He is invited by his girlfriend, Olivia Regent, to a fashion show. Backstage, mobster Tommy O'Shea and his goons muscle in. Tommy threatens Olivia, who is his ex-wife and mother to their daughter, Chelsea.

When Paul discovers bruises on Olivia's wrist, she informs Paul of her ex-husband's behavior. Paul confronts Tommy, but Tommy's henchman Chicki Paconi threatens Paul with a revolver. The confrontation ends with the arrival of Chelsea. D.A. Brian Hoyle and his associate NYPD detective Lt. Hector Vasquez visit Paul's home. He informs them about Tommy. Hoyle says they have been trying to nab Tommy for years, and he wants Olivia to testify.

That night at a restaurant, Paul proposes to Olivia, who accepts. Olivia excuses herself to the bathroom and is attacked by Tommy's associate, Freddie "Flakes" Garrity. Flakes bashes her head against a mirror, disfiguring her. Freddie escapes, although Paul gets a look at him. At the hospital, Paul meets Lt. Mickey King, who has been working on the O'Shea case for 16 years, and his partner, Janice Omori. King warns Paul to let the police handle it.

During a failed bugging mission against the mob, both O'Shea associate Albert and Janice are killed, getting struck by Freddie's car. Freddie and his henchmen, pretending to be the cops sent to protect Olivia, attack Paul and Olivia at her apartment. Freddie shoots Olivia in the back, killing her as the couple tries to escape. Paul jumps from the roof of his apartment, where he lands in a pile of trash bags, and is retrieved by the police. Tommy is cleared of involvement in Olivia's death and seeks custody of Chelsea. Paul assaults Tommy, but his right-hand man Sal leaves him unconscious.

Paul plans to return to his vigilante methods and is assisted by Hoyle, who learns his department has been corrupted by Tommy. Paul poisons Chicki with cyanide disguised as sugar in a cannoli. He then kills Freddie with a remote-controlled explosive soccer ball. Tommy finds out from Vasquez, who is his informant, that Paul is a vigilante and will be going after him for killing Olivia. Vasquez tries to kill Paul himself; however, Paul gets the upper hand and kills him.

Hoyle arrives and finds that Tommy wants both him and Paul dead. Hoyle tells Paul he must never see him again, and Paul agrees. Using Chelsea as a bait, Tommy has henchmen named Frankie, Mickey and Angel (the same three thugs who murdered Paul's wife and raped his daughter twenty years earlier) guard the dress factory. Once Paul gets inside, he uses a forklift as a distraction. The henchmen destroy it, but Paul appears behind them, disarms Angel, and shoots Frankie and Mickey dead. Paul makes Angel tell him where Chelsea is and wraps Angel in plastic wrapper. Chelsea makes a getaway. Sal and Tommy go after her, but Tommy sends Sal after Paul. While searching for Paul, Sal accidentally shoots Angel dead. Paul shoots Sal into a garment shredding machine. Lt. King arrives but is wounded by Tommy.

Armed with Angel's shotgun, Paul corners Tommy and knocks him into a liming pool, where he disintegrates. King thanks Paul for saving his life. Paul goes to rejoin Chelsea, calling out to the injured King, "Hey, Lieutenant, if you need any help, give me a call".

== Cast ==
- Charles Bronson as Paul Kersey / Professor Paul Stewart
- Lesley-Anne Down as Olivia Regent
- Michael Parks as Tommy O'Shea
- Robert Joy as Freddie "Flakes" Garrity
- Saul Rubinek as District Attorney Brian Hoyle
- Kenneth Welsh as Lieutenant Mickey King
- Lisa Inouye as Detective Janice Omori
- Miguel Sandoval as Lieutenant Hector Vasquez
- Erica Lancaster as Chelsea O'Shea
- Chuck Shamata as Sal Paconi
- Kevin Lund as Chicki Paconi
- Scott Spidell as Frankie
- Tim MacMenamin as Mickey
- Sandro Limotta as Angel
- Melissa Illes as Runway Model
- Jefferson Mappin as Albert "Big Al"
- Michael Dunston as Reggie
- Claire Rankin as Maxine
- Sharolyn Sparrow as Dawn
- Andrea Mann as Mrs. Hoyle
- Marcello Meleca as Hoyle
- Elena Kudaba as Paul's Housekeeper

== Production ==
=== Development ===
The three previous films in the Death Wish series were produced by Cannon Films. In 1989, Cannon faced Chapter 11 bankruptcy and its financial records came under investigation by the U.S. Securities and Exchange Commission. Co-owners Menahem Golan and Yoram Globus also had a personal falling out during the collapse of their company. Golan soon launched his own company, 21st Century Film Corporation. The films of the new company tended to have small budgets and performed poorly at the box office. Meanwhile, the Death Wish films continued to enjoy popularity in the video and television market. Golan came up with the idea of a fifth Death Wish film to serve as a much-needed hit for the company.

Financing to start the film production was secured through a loan from the Lewis Horwitz Organization. Golan still owned an unused screenplay for a Death Wish film, submitted in the late 1980s by J. Lee Thompson and Gail Morgan Hickman, which had Paul Kersey battling against terrorists in Alcatraz Island, San Francisco. He decided against using it, since it would be too costly to produce. Instead, he hired Michael Colleary to write a new script.

=== Casting ===
Golan initially reserved directorial duties for himself, but his preoccupation with directing Crime and Punishment reportedly prevented him from doing so. Michael Winner was available to direct, but was never asked to do so. According to Winner, his lack of interest in directing Death Wish 4: The Crackdown (1987) may have led Golan to count him out. Golan then hired Steve Carver for the job, an experienced director in the action film genre. Carver was so amused by this that he set up a lunch meeting during which, he recalled discussing with Charles Bronson the depiction of Paul Kersey. Bronson wanted the character to become more "sympathetic and less violent as he thought the character was becoming repetitive and that there was nothing really for him to chew on. He wanted a lot of elements that made the character somewhat soft, wanting to get away from the blatant killing of bad guys and the vigilante stuff. He had some humorous ideas". After Carver took his notes from the meeting, he began revising the script with writer, Stephen Peters.

Carver worked on the pre-production for two months before Golan decided to replace him after the decision to pare down the budget. His replacement was Allan A. Goldstein, who held dual citizenship as a Canadian and American. Carver believes that it was Goldstein's Canadian ties, which influenced the decision. Goldstein himself was surprised, since he specialized in drama films. Death Wish V: The Face of Death was his first action film. To prepare for directing the film, he tried familiarizing himself with the film series by watching the previous entries for the first time. He soon started revising the script. He attempted to insert humor and black comedy elements.

=== Filming ===
Filming began on March 2, 1993 and ended on April 12. At first, there were several locations available all around the United States, until the film producers chose a big studio in Wilmington, North Carolina that had originally been built and owned by the film producer of the first film, Dino De Laurentiis. The location was chosen as it wasn't controlled by unions, and had previously attracted other film producers as the studio was used to cut costs. A lot of the money went to Bronson's salary, so the film production was forced to change places to Toronto, Ontario.

The change caused problems for the production because film companies receive tax breaks when shooting in Canada, but in order to qualify for the discounts, a number of key positions have to be filled by Canadians. The budget had to be cut even lower, which made Goldstein revise the story further. The previous films of the series were mostly shot on location, but the fifth film was mainly shot in a studio. All the scenes involving the dress factory were shot in a studio.

Bronson and Golan, were not on speaking terms during the filming, only communicating by using Goldstein as an intermediary. Goldstein was uncertain of the reasons behind this adversarial relationship. Golan was not present for most of the shooting, preoccupied with filming Crime and Punishment (2002) in Russia.

== Reception ==
=== Box office ===
Death Wish V was a box office disaster. The film was partially financed through an advanced payment by Trimark Pictures, in exchange for domestic theatrical and home video rights. Trimark released the film on January 14, 1994, to 248 movie theaters. It made $503,936 on its opening weekend. The final box office gross of the film in the United States market was estimated at just over $1.7 million. It was released for the home video market later in 1994. Rental records pointed to a solid presence of the film in the video market, but it was not as lucrative as Death Wish 4: The Crackdown (1987).

=== Critical response ===
Death Wish V was universally panned and holds a rare 0% rating on Rotten Tomatoes based on reviews from 5 critics. On Metacritic it has a score of 25 out of 100 based on reviews from 6 critics, indicating "generally unfavorable" reviews.

Chris Willman of the Los Angeles Times criticized the film series' repeated recycling of the same basic plotline, and Charles Bronson's perceptible boredom with the Paul Kersey role; Wilman also noted that even fans of the series would find this particular installment unbearably dull.

Stephen Holden of The New York Times remarked that Bronson "sounds terminally bored", and criticized the film for its sadistic violence.

Richard Harrington of The Washington Post said the film "looks and feels older than its original mold." He criticized that by this point Bronson was embarrassingly old for the part of an action hero, approaching 73 years old, at the time, and that the Death Wish plot had been done past the point of any interest.

Variety's Joe Leydon likewise said the film "finds both the character and the series looking mighty tired." Like Willman, he said that Bronson seemed bored with his role and that the film failed to provide any fresh twist to the Death Wish plotline. He further remarked that series fans would find it a major disappointment due to the low body count, slow pace, and general lack of excitement.

Candice Russell of the South Florida Sun Sentinel gave the film two out four stars. She criticized the amount of gore but also pointed out that "there is also a level of suspense and a plot involving an innocent child, qualities that make this grisly go-round more than a gore-fest." Her final consensus was "Death Wish V is better than fans of the previous sequels have a right to expect."

Sean P. Means of The Salt Lake Tribune gave it one star and said it was a "shoddy action flick that is a textbook case of non-entertainment." His final thoughts were "Death Wish V fosters its own death wish: the audience's fervent wish that this lame series would just curl up and die."

Leonard Maltin's Movie Guide gave the film a BOMB rating and said: "No plot, just a pretext: Bronson's fiancé is murdered on the orders of her mobster ex-husband Parks so (yawn) he turns vigilante yet again. Crude, stupid entry in this weary series, very badly directed, with an emphasis on torture."

== Cancelled sequel ==
Bronson was reportedly disappointed with the failure of Death Wish V: The Face of Death, continuing a streak of disillusionment with the franchise going back to the third installment. Feeling that the character of Paul Kersey was too one-dimensional to be improved on, he decided not to reprise the role in future projects. Menahem Golan, however, planned to make a sixth film titled Death Wish VI: The New Vigilante, which would see a new protagonist being introduced as Kersey's apprentice so that the actor could be properly replaced. The project was cancelled after Golan's company, 21st Century Film Corporation, went bankrupt in 1996.

== Sources ==
- Talbot, Paul (2006). "Death Wish 4: The Crackdown: This Time It's War!". Bronson's Loose!: The Making of the Death Wish Films. iUniverse. ISBN 978-0595379828.
- Talbot, Paul (2006). "Death Wish V: The Face of Death: No Judge. No Jury. No Appeals. No Deals.". Bronson's Loose!: The Making of the Death Wish Films. iUniverse. ISBN 978-0595379828.
