= Death sentence (disambiguation) =

Death sentence usually refers generally to capital punishment.

It may also refer to:

- "Death Sentence" (short story), a 1943 short story by Isaac Asimov
- Death Sentence, a 1948 French novella (L'Arrêt du mort) by Maurice Blanchot (translated by Lydia Davis, 1998)
- Death Sentence (1968 film), a 1968 Italian film
- Death Sentence (1974 film), 1974 television film starring Nick Nolte
- Death Sentence (novel), a 1975 novel by Brian Garfield
  - Death Sentence (2007 film), a 2007 film adaptation of the Brian Garfield novel
- Mrityudand or The Death Sentence, a 1997 Indian film
- Death Sentence: The True Story of Velma Barfield's Life, Crimes, and Execution, a 1998 non-fiction book by Jerry Bledsoe
- Death Sentence: The Decay of Public Language, a 2003 book by Don Watson
- Death Sentence (album), a 2014 album from American Christian metal band Those Who Fear

== See also ==
- Sentenced to Death (film), a 1989 Hungarian film
- Sentence of Death (EP), a 1984 thrash metal record by German band Destruction
- Sentence of Death (TV episode), a 1964 British TV episode of the Doctor Who serial The Keys of Marinus
