= Death Wish II =

1982 American vigilante action film by Michael Winner

- Theatrical release poster
- Directed by: Michael Winner
- Written by: David Engelbach
- Based on: Characters by Brian Garfield
- Produced by: Menahem Golan; Yoram Globus
- Starring: Charles Bronson; Jill Ireland; Vincent Gardenia; J. D. Cannon; Anthony Franciosa
- Cinematography: Thomas Del Ruth; Richard H. Kline
- Edited by: Michael Winner (as Arnold Crust); Julian Semilian
- Music by: Jimmy Page
- Production companies: Golan-Globus Productions; Landers-Roberts Productions; City Films; American European Productions
- Distributed by: Filmways Pictures (NA); Columbia Pictures (International)
- Release dates: February 11, 1982 (UK); February 19, 1982 (US)
- Running time: 88 minutes
- Country: United States
- Language: English
- Budget: $8 million
- Box office: $29 million (U.S.A. Collection)

Death Wish II is a 1982 American vigilante action-thriller film directed and co-edited by Michael Winner. It is the sequel to the 1974 film Death Wish. It is the second installment in the Death Wish film series. In the story, architect Paul Kersey (Charles Bronson) moves to Los Angeles with his daughter Carol Kersey Toby (Robin Sherwood). After Carol is murdered at the hands of several gang members, Kersey once again chooses to become a vigilante. Unlike the original, in which he hunts down every criminal he encounters, Kersey mostly pursues his family's attackers. The sequel makes a complete breakaway from the Brian Garfield novels Death Wish and Death Sentence, redefining the Paul Kersey character. It was succeeded by Death Wish 3.

The sequel was produced by Cannon Films, which had purchased the rights to the Death Wish concept from Dino De Laurentiis. Cannon executive Menahem Golan planned to direct the film, but Winner returned on Bronson's insistence. The soundtrack was composed by guitarist Jimmy Page. Death Wish II was released in the United States in February 1982 by Filmways Pictures. Like the original, Columbia Pictures handled the international release. Paramount Pictures, via Trifecta Entertainment & Media, handles the television rights. It earned $29 million during its domestic theatrical run.

== Plot ==
Several years after the events of the first film, Paul Kersey has recovered from his shattered life and is working in Los Angeles as a freelance architect. He is designing a new building for his close friend Elliot Cass, owner of a radio station, and dating one of its journalists, Geri Nichols. They pick up Paul's daughter, Carol Kersey Toby, from a mental hospital and spend the afternoon at a fairground, where Paul's wallet is stolen by a savage gang led by Charlie "Nirvana" Wilson. Paul gives chase and the gang splits up. Paul corners Jiver in an alley and lets him go when he says he doesn't have the wallet.

Checking Paul's identification, they locate and break into his house. Rosario, Paul's housekeeper, is raped and sodomized and when Paul arrives home with Carol, he is beaten unconscious. Rosario tries to call the police and Nirvana kills her with a crowbar. They take Carol to their hideout where Punkcut rapes her. Before Jiver can do the same, Carol runs through a plate-glass window, falls onto an iron fence, and gets impaled.

Paul refuses to help the police by identifying the gang members. After Carol's funeral, Paul takes his handgun to a low-rent inner-city hotel and begins searching for the gang. He encounters and pursues Stomper to a condemned building where a drug deal is going down. Paul fatally shoots one dealer and orders the others out before killing Stomper. The next evening, he hears screams from a couple being assaulted in a parking garage by Jiver and three others criminals. Paul kills two of them. He then follows a blood trail from the wounded Jiver into an abandoned warehouse and kills him.

The victims of the parking garage assault refuse to identify Paul to the LAPD, which asks the NYPD for guidance on dealing with a vigilante. Detective Frank Ochoa, suspecting it may be Paul again, is sent to assist. Ochoa believes that Paul, when caught, will reveal he was released without being charged for killing ten muggers in New York. Ochoa tells Geri about Paul's vigilante killing spree, but Paul denies it when she confronts him.

Ochoa tails Paul, who rides on a bus along with the three surviving gang members to Point Firmin park where an arms and drug deal is underway. Ochoa warns Paul when a sniper notices him, then kills the sniper, precipitating a gunfight. Ochoa is mortally wounded by Nirvana. Paul kills the dealer's accomplice, and then the dealer; his car drives off a cliff and explodes. Paul wounds then kills Cutter. Nirvana escapes, and Ochoa tells Paul to avenge him before he dies insantly. Paul retreats as Punckut succumbs to his injuries after giving information about Nirvana to the police.

Paul learns from one of Geri's colleagues that the police are deploying a tactical unit to capture Nirvana. He obtains a police scanner and drives to the location the arrest will take place. Nirvana, under the influence of PCP, slashes Paul's arm and stabs officers while trying to escape. He is tried, found criminally insane, and sent to a mental institution. Geri, writing a story about the case, takes Paul to the sanitarium to meet Nirvana's doctor. Paul steals an ID card during the visit, and forges a fake one. The night Paul prepares to leave for Mexico with Geri, he returns to the clinic and confronts Nirvana, who repeatedly stabs Paul with a shiv. When Nirvana's arm is plunged into a high-voltage generator, Paul turns it on, electrocuting him. An orderly recognizes Paul from the newspaper coverage of Carol's murder and gives him a three minute head start before he rings the alarm.

Geri finds evidence that Paul forged the doctor's card in his house, and hears a news report about Nirvana's murder on the radio. Realizing Paul really is the vigilante, she takes off her engagement ring and leaves; Paul arrives minutes later.

Several months later, Paul attends the unveiling of his building design for the radio station. Cass invites him to a launch party, but asks why Paul always seems unavailable at night. He accepts the invitation and asks "What else would I be doing?"

== Cast ==
- Charles Bronson as Paul Kersey
- Jill Ireland as Geri Nichols
- Vincent Gardenia as Lieutenant Frank Ochoa
- J.D. Cannon as New York City District Attorney
- Paul Lambert as New York City Police Commissioner
- Anthony Franciosa as Los Angeles Police Commissioner Herman Baldwin
- Drew Snyder as Los Angeles Deputy Commissioner Hawkins
- Paul Comi as Senator McLean
- Robin Sherwood as Carol Kersey Toby
- Charles Cyphers as Donald Kay
- Ben Frank as Lieutenant Art Mankiewicz
- Michael Prince as Elliot Cass
- Thomas F. Duffy as Charlie "Nirvana" Wilson
- Larry Fishburne as "Cutter"
- Kevyn Major Howard as "Stomper"
- Stuart K. Robinson as "Jiver"
- E. Lamont Johnson as "Punkcut"
- Silvana Gallardo as Rosario
- Robert F. Lyons as Fred McKenzie
- Frank Campanella as Judge Neil A. Lake
- Robert Snively as Dr. Gofeld
- Steffen Zacharias as Dr. Clark
- David Daniels as Lang
- Don Dubbins as Mike
- Buck Young as Charles Pearce
- Jim Galante as Tim Shaw
- Peter Pan as Chinese Landlord
- Jim Begg as Tourist
- Melody Santangello as Mary, Tourist's Wife
- Karsen Lee as Nirvana's Girl #1
- Leslie Graves as Nirvana's Girl #2
- Henny Youngman as Himself
- William Bogert as Fred Brown (uncredited)
- Terry Leonard as Sniper In Tree (uncredited)

== Production ==
=== Development ===
Brian Garfield, author of the original Death Wish novel, was so unhappy with the film version that he wrote his own sequel, Death Sentence. "They'd made a hero out of him", said Garfield. "I thought I'd shown that he'd become a very sick man." The idea to produce a sequel to Death Wish (1974) originated with producers Menahem Golan and Yoram Globus, owners of Cannon Films. They reportedly announced their plans to do so prior to actually securing the rights to the franchise. Dino De Laurentiis, co-producer of the original film, threatened them with a lawsuit unless they properly purchased the rights. He negotiated payments for himself, co-producers Hal Landers and Bobby Roberts, and original author Brian Garfield. The agreement included future payments for each prospective sequel.

In 1980, Cannon briefly hired Garfield to write an adaptation of his sequel to Death Wish, Death Sentence, in 1980. However, Golam and Globus did not want to use Garfield's book, preferring an original story by David Engelbach, Golan, and Hal Landers. After they purchased the rights to the first film from De Laurentiis, they purchased the rights to the characters of the novels from Garfield, meaning they could make a sequel without adapting the original novels. "We think our story is a better film story", said Golan. "You cannot call a film exploitative just because it touches on disturbing issues", said Globus. "Both Death Wish films are a valid comment on American society... the theme of street violence getting out of control is sadly more of a fact of life than it was seven years ago." Garfield later approved a separate adaptation without the character of Paul Kersey directed by James Wan in 2007.

David Engelbach was then asked to write the screenplay. After he saw the final product, he was "somewhat appalled" how the film differed from his original script. His script did not include any rape scenes, but those were included by Michael Winner to "get his rocks off". Engelbach argued that "serious issues - namely, the deteriorating state of our criminal justice system. The actions of the Bronson character are dictated by the inability of the police to prevent crime, the preoccupation of the courts with technical rather than real justice, and the cancerous climate of fear in which we find ourselves today. Paul Kersey is no hero. In his pursuit of vengeance he loses the only emotional relationship of his life and by story's end has become as much a victim of crime as the thugs he leaves dead in his wake".

=== Casting ===
Charles Bronson was offered $1.5 million to reprise the role. Jill Ireland was cast in the film because Bronson, her husband, insisted on it. Her character Geri Nichols serves as both the love interest to Paul and the voice of opposition to the death penalty. She had been offered the role of Joanne Kersey in the film's predecessor, Death Wish (1974). However, Charles Bronson refused, as he did not want his wife humiliated and messed around with by the actors who played muggers. After she was hired for this film, Bronson wanted her character not to get raped or killed by the villains of the film. Cannon initially asked Golan to direct; however, Bronson insisted on recruiting Michael Winner, the director of the original.

Winner had suffered a downturn in his career since the mid-1970s, with no box-office hit since Death Wish. He agreed to return to the franchise and took the initiative in revising Engelbach's script. Winner recalled that De Laurentiis was having second thoughts about letting someone else produce the sequel and offered to hire him to do the film for his own production company. Winner refused, and De Laurentiis did not renege on his deal with Cannon. The producer, however, started work on a "clone" of the film. The final result was Fighting Back (1982).

Winner said the sequel was pertinent because "mugging is now a bigger issue in America. It's spread to towns where it was not a problem before. In Beverly Hills, instead of talking about other people's failed movies – thank God, something has stopped them at last – they talk about their muggings." The film introduced significant changes for the character of Paul. One involved his modus operandi as a vigilante. In the original film, Paul would shoot and kill every criminal in his vicinity. In the sequel, he is after five specific criminals who are responsible for the death of his daughter Carol Kersey Toby (Robin Sherwood). His single-minded pursuit extends to ignoring other potential targets. He is seen to ignore most thieves, drug dealers, and one violent pimp.

Another change involves Paul's abilities. In the first film, his activities as a vigilante rely on his use of weapons. In the sequel, he is able to beat up men who are considerably younger than himself. While casting the actors for the roles of the villains, Winner gave the actors playing the thugs a lot of creative leeway. They bought their own costumes, designed their own makeup and tested them out on passers-by to see how intimidating they'd look. Laurence Fishburne bought a pair of magician's gloves and waved his knife like a wand, while Kevyn Major Howard waxed his eyebrows and shaved the front of his head to make himself look like a snake. He even developed mannerisms like his insane laugh, slapping his head and twirling a baton from seeing a live drummer in a punk band.

=== Filming ===
Among the final revisions of the script was a change in location. The original script set the action in San Francisco, but the revision moved the setting to Los Angeles. Winner said the film was "the same, but different", from the original. "That's what sequels are – Rocky II, Rocky III – you don't see Sylvester Stallone move to the Congo and become a nurse. Here the look of LA is what's different. Besides – rape doesn't date!"

Principal photography began on May 4, 1981, in Downtown Los Angeles and concluded on July 1, 1981, in San Pedro. Filming often lasted twelve hours a day in order to complete it before a Screen Actors Guild strike. The film was shot on location and depicted actual "sleazy" areas of the city. Twenty off-duty men of the LAPD were hired to protect the film cast and crew from potential trouble. A scene involving the abandoned and crumbling Hollywood Hotel was shot in an abandoned hotel months before it was demolished.

Several film extras were locals hired to play a bit part, or happened to be passing by during a shooting. Among them were drug addicts, a drag queen, Hare Krishnas, and bikers. All were included by the director in an attempt to get an authentic feel of the streets of Los Angeles. Winner tried to keep the mood on the set lighthearted. "Just because a film is terrifying, that doesn't mean the people making it have to be grim", he said. All of the filming happened in Los Angeles, California. Places like San Pedro, Ladera Heights and Hollywood were included.

Silvana Gallardo said the rape scene was "grueling" and took about six days to film. To prepare for the role, she talked to an actual rape victim.

== Music ==
Isaac Hayes was recommended by the producers of the film to compose the score. Michael Winner chose former Led Zeppelin guitarist Jimmy Page, who was Winner's neighbor at the time. The opening credits bear Page's signature guitar tone, along with the heavy reverb-laden drum sound that he used with Led Zeppelin. The film's soundtrack was released in February 1982. Portions of the score were sampled by Twiztid in the song "Spiderwebs" from their 2010 album Heartbroken & Homicidal.

== Release ==
=== Theatrical ===
Cannon Films was able to sell distribution rights to several interested buyers. Theatrical rights in the United States and Canada were purchased by Filmways. The company had recently acquired American International Pictures, known for its exploitation films, and the film fit in with their library of genre films. Columbia Pictures purchased the international distribution rights. Paramount Pictures purchased the television broadcast rights for the domestic market. The film was originally intended for release around the Christmas of 1981. Filmways decided to postpone release until February 1982 to face a weaker competition for an audience. The film became the top-grossing film of its opening week.

=== Home media ===
The film was first released on VHS and then on DVD. It was released on 4K Ultra HD Blu-ray in the U.S. in May 2022 by Vinegar Syndrome (under license from MGM).

== Reception ==
=== Box office ===
The film grossed $29 million in United States theaters, a rare box-office hit for the ailing Filmways. The company still ended 1982 with losses of $52.7 million. It was subsequently purchased by Orion Pictures. Another account says it made $10 million in rentals.

It made a $2 million profit for Cannon Films and made an extra $29 million worldwide.

It has since earned further money at home and abroad through release for the video market. A poll for HBO noted Death Wish II was in higher demand by paying viewers than Chariots of Fire (1981).

=== Critical response ===
Vincent Canby of The New York Times said it was "even more foolish, more tacky, and more self-righteously inhumane than the 1974 melodrama off which it has been spun" and "so lethargic that it fails even to provoke outrage." He particularly criticized the way the film essentially repeats the plot of the original, the contrived incompetence of the police characters, and Jill Ireland's unconvincing performance.

Roger Ebert gave it zero stars, noting that he reserves this rating solely for those very few films that are both "artistically inept and morally repugnant." Citing the lethargic tone of the acting and directing, the lack of plot, the lifeless dialogue, and the weak action sequences, he concluded, "while the first film convinced me of Bronson's need for vengeance, this one is just a series of dumb killings." Variety called it "every bit as revolting as... the original".

On Rotten Tomatoes, the film holds an approval rating of 33% based on 18 reviews. On Metacritic the film has a weighted average score of 11 out of 100, based on 7 critics, indicating "overwhelming dislike".

The movie was nominated for Worst Picture at the 1982 Stinkers Bad Movie Awards. The film was also nominated for a Golden Raspberry Award for Worst Musical Score at the 3rd Golden Raspberry Awards.

== Sequel ==
A sequel, Death Wish 3, was released in 1985.

== See also ==
- List of films featuring home invasions
- List of hood films
