= Zachary Dylan Smith =

American actor (born 1994)

- Born: November 23, 1994 (age 30); Columbia, South Carolina, United States
- Occupation: Actor

Zachary Dylan Smith (born November 23, 1994) is a former American actor.

== Biography ==
Smith's career began in community theatre when he was six years old.

He played Bob Gilbreth in Cheaper By the Dozen and before moving into films continued with other stage performances including ToTo in The Wizard of Oz. His break came when he was cast as the young Dale in TV production 3: The Dale Earnhardt Story (2004) and he later landed a recurring role on the TV series One Tree Hill as young Dan. He played Brendan Hume in the feature film Death Sentence (2007) which starred Kevin Bacon. He plays young Chase in Rex (2008) and ten-year-old Leonidas in Meet the Spartans (2008).

== Filmography ==
Year	Title	Role	Other notes
Film
2007	Death Sentence	Young Brendan Hume	
2008	Rex	Young Chase	
2008	Meet the Spartans	10-year-old Leonidas	
Television
2004	3: The Dale Earnhardt Story	Dale Earnhardt	
2006	One Tree Hill	Young Dan	Three episodes
