= Kanin Howell =

American actor

- Born: Kynen Josephus Howell
- Occupations: stunt coordinator; stunt performer; stunt double; actor
- Years active: 1988–present
- Spouse: Shiva Howell
- Website: kaninhowell.com

Kanin Howell (born June 20, 1981; Austin, Texas) is an American stunt performer, stunt coordinator, stunt double and actor based in Los Angeles. He is a two-time Screen Actors Guild Awards nominee for his roles in The Unit and CSI: NY.

== Early life and career ==
=== Early career ===
Howell was born on June 20, 1981, in Austin, Texas to stunt performer, Norman Howell. At the age of 5 he made his professional debut, and by the time while he was 8, he performed in Dances with Wolves (1990), and went on to perform in several films throughout his childhood including, Judge Reinhold's Vice Versa (1988), Robert Radler's Best of the Best II (1992), and Kevin Costner's Wyatt Earp (1994).

=== Career ===
Howell has performed stunt-work in numerous works including, Mel Gibson's The Patriot (2000), The Last Castle (2001) with American actor Robert Redford, Murder By Numbers (2002), Jesse Dylan's American Wedding (2003), Victor Salva's Jeepers Creepers 2 (2003), CSI: NY (2004–13) The Unit (2006–07), Hell Ride (2008). New Girl (2011–12), Need for Speed (2014), Agents of S.H.I.E.L.D. (2014–16), Hollows Grove (2014) and Brooklyn Nine-Nine (2014–19).

He has worked as a stunt coordinator on works such as The Call, Scream Queens, Counterpart, CSI: Cyber, Arrested Development, Franklin & Bash and The Client List.

As an actor, he has starred in films such as Need for Speed, Death Sentence, Hell Ride, Priest, Aces 'N' Eights, Mr. Brooks, Secondhand Lions and The Patriot. On television, Howell starred in NBC's Grimm, CBS's The Unit, The Young and the Restless, True Blood, CSI: NY and Criminal Minds.

Howell has been a stunt double for many actors, including, Ewan McGregor, Elijah Wood, Skeet Ulrich, Garrett Hedlund, Chris Browning, Michael Eklund, Jason Gerhardt, David Hoflin, Matt Cohen and Seth Adkins.

In 2013, Howell founded Drone 55, a commercial aerial photography firm based in Los Angeles in Los Angeles. He has also been a member of Stunts Unlimited since 2007.

== Filmography ==
Year	Work	Role
1990	Dances with Wolves	stuntman
1991	Stone Cold	stunts
1992	Radio Flyer	stunts
1992	When No One Would Listen	Boy No. 2
1994	Ed Wood	stunts
1994	Wyatt Earp	stunts
1994	The Pagemaster	as: Canan J. Howell
1997	The Postman	stunts
1998	The Day Lincoln Was Shot	stunts
2000	The Patriot	stunts actor: Postrider
2001	Pearl Harbor	stunts
2001	The Last Castle	stunts
2001	3000 Miles to Graceland	stunt performer
2002	Spider-man	stunt performer
2002	Murder by Numbers	stunts
2002	24	stunts
2002	Angel	stunts
2003	Secondhand Lions	stunts actor: Hood
2003	American Wedding	stunt performer
2003	The Agency	stunts
2004	Silver Lake	stunt driver
2005	Hostage	stunts
2006	Peaceful Warrior	stunt double: Scott Mechlowicz
2006	Gilmore Girls	stunts
2006	Flicka	stunt performer
2007	Beowulf	stunt performer
2007	Death Sentence	As: Baggy – stunts
2007	Mr. Brooks	stunt double: Dane Cook – Pick-Up Driver
2007	The Man	stunts
2007	The Shield	stunts
2008	Henry Poole Is Here	stunt double – stunts
2008	Aces 'N' Eights	stunts – actor
2008	Leverage	stunt double: Christian Kane – stunts
2010	Takers	stunts
2010	Day One	stunt double: Jamie Thomas King – stunts
2010	Terriers	stunt double: Zack Silva
2011	Southland	stunts
2011	Columbus Circle	co-stunt coordinator – stunt double: Jason Antoon
2011	Justified	stunt double: Billy Miller
2011	Love's Christmas Journey	as: Kanin J. Howell
2012	Django Unchained	stunts
2012	How I Met Your Mother	co-stunt coordinator
2012	Least Among Saints	Police Officer
2013	The Call	stunt coordinator – stunt double: Michael Eklund
2013	Ray Donovan	actor
2013	Call Me Crazy: A Five Film	stunt coordinator
2014	Need For Speed	CHP No. 1 – stunt driver
2014	Masters of Sex	stunts
2016	Westworld	stunts – stunt double: James Marsden / actor: Chris Browning
2018	Three Rivers	stunt coordinator
2003–2004	Collateral	stunts
2003–2005	The O.C.	stunt double: Chris Carmack – stunts
2004–2013	CSI: NY	stunts – actor – co-stunt coordinator – stunt double
2005–2011	House	stunts
2005–2013	Arrested Development	stunt coordinator – stunt double
2006–2007	The Unit	stunts – stunt double: Scott Foley
2009–2013	Sons of Anarchy	stunt double: Charlie Hunnam – stunts
2013–2017	Nathan for You	stunts
2014–2020	Brooklyn Nine-Nine	drone pilot – stunt coordinator – stunts
2017–2018	Counterpart	stunt coordinator

== Awards and nominations ==
Year	Award	Category	Work	Result
2007	Screen Actors Guild Awards	Outstanding Performance by a Stunt Ensemble in a Television Series	The Unit	Nominated
2011	Screen Actors Guild Awards	Outstanding Performance by a Stunt Ensemble in a Television Series	CSI: NY	Nominated
