= Death Sentence (2007 film) =

Film by James Wan

- Theatrical release poster
- Directed by: James Wan
- Screenplay by: Ian Mackenzie Jeffers
- Based on: Death Sentence by Brian Garfield
- Produced by: Ashok Amritraj; Howard Baldwin; Karen Baldwin
- Starring: Kevin Bacon; Garrett Hedlund; Kelly Preston; Aisha Tyler; John Goodman
- Cinematography: John R. Leonetti
- Edited by: Michael N. Knue
- Music by: Charlie Clouser
- Production companies: Hyde Park Entertainment; Baldwin Entertainment Group
- Distributed by: 20th Century Fox
- Release date: August 31, 2007
- Running time: 106 minutes
- Country: United States
- Language: English
- Budget: $20 million
- Box office: $17 million

Death Sentence is a 2007 American vigilante action film, directed by James Wan from a screenplay written by Ian Mackenzie Jeffers (Wan's first film as director not written by him or Leigh Whannell) and starring Kevin Bacon as Nick Hume, a mild-mannered executive who takes the law into his own hands after his son is murdered by a gang member as an initiation ritual and then must protect his family from the gang's resulting vengeance. The film is loosely based on the 1975 novel by Brian Garfield.

Death Sentence was released on August 31, 2007 by 20th Century Fox. It received generally negative reviews from critics and grossed $17 million against a budget of $20 million.

== Plot ==
Nick Hume is an insurance company vice president who believes in doing things by the book. He lives with his wife, Helen, and his two sons: the older, charismatic, hockey-playing Brendan and the younger, less charismatic, artistic Lucas. Stopping at a gas station on the way home from a hockey game, Nick and Brendan get caught up in a robbery. Ringleader Billy kills the clerk while new gangmember Joe Darley slashes Brendan's throat as part of his initiation. Before Joe escapes, Nick pulls off his mask. Brendan is rushed to the hospital but dies.

Nick identifies Joe in a lineup but learns he will get off lightly due to weak evidence. At pretrial, Nick recants his identification, allowing Joe to go free. Nick trails the gang members, who take Joe to an apartment and rewards him with a prostitute. He ambushes Joe in the laundry room and stabs him to death that night. Billy later learns from a neighbor that Nick was present at the scene.

The gang ambushes Nick outside his office and chase him to a multistorey car park. Nick manages to escape, resulting in the death of Tommy, another member of the gang. The police figure out that Nick has entangled himself with the gang but cannot arrest him without evidence. That night, a guilt-stricken Lucas gets into an argument with Nick, accusing him of favoritism towards Brendan.

Nick's suitcase (which he dropped during the chase) is returned to his office along with a phone number. Nick calls the number and reaches Billy, who reveals Joe was his younger brother and that killing Joe has brought a "death sentence" upon Helen and Lucas. Nick informs Jessica Wallis, the detective assigned to Brendan's case. She grants his family police protection and issues APBs on the gang. However, that night, the gang kills the officers protecting Nick's house, subdue Nick, and shoot Helen and Lucas. Helen dies while Nick and Lucas are hospitalized, with the latter in a coma. After Nick awakens, Jessica warns him against taking action against the gang by threatening to have him arrested if he continues his crusade. Nick visits Lucas and apologizes for paying more attention to Brendan before escaping the hospital.

Tracking the phone number to a bar, Nick roughly pressures the bartender to reveal the location of Heco, a junkie member of the gang, and a place to get firearms. Nick visits black market arms dealer Bones and buys several guns, ammunition, and some instructional booklets. As Nick is leaving, Bones reveals himself as Billy and Joe's father but lets Nick go, thinking it's time for Billy to reap consequences of his actions.

After Nick familiarizes himself with the guns, he shaves off his hair, dons Brendan's jacket, and heads to Heco's apartment. Nick violently interrogates Heco, who reveals the gang's lair is an abandoned mental hospital they call "The Office," and forces him to call Billy's number, then executes him while Billy listens. Bones confronts Billy, reveals he sold guns to Nick, and berates him for his recklessness. After hearing this, Billy shoots his father dead in response.

Nick heads to "The Office" and kills the remaining gang members before facing off in the chapel with Billy, seriously wounding each other. As the two sit on the same pew, Billy comments that he turned Nick into a vicious cold-blooded killer just like the gang. Unmoved, Nick ends Billy's life before returning home, watching old home movies of him, Helen, Brendan, and Lucas as he awaits his arrest. Jessica arrives and informs Nick that Lucas has improved and will live, relieving Nick.

== Cast ==
- Kevin Bacon as Nick Hume, a family man and successful businessman/VP at Starfish Capital driven to violence after watching his son being killed
- Garrett Hedlund as Billy Darley, the leader of a violent street gang who was responsible for Brendan's murder
- Kelly Preston as Helen Hume, Nick's wife who is a school dean
- Aisha Tyler as Detective Jessica Wallis, a homicide detective looking into Brendan's murder
- John Goodman as Bones Darley, Billy and Joe's father who is a black market gun dealer and mechanic running Billy's drug racket
- Matt O'Leary as Joe Darley, Billy's younger brother who personally killed Brendan as part of an initiation
- Leigh Whannell as Spink, a member of Billy's crew
- Stuart Lafferty as Brendan Hume, Nick's eldest son and Lucas' older brother who was murdered
  - Zachary Dylan Smith as Young Brendan Hume
- Jordan Garrett as Lucas Hume, Nick's other son and Brendan's younger brother
- Edi Gathegi as Bodie, Billy's second-in-command
- Yorgo Constantine as Michael Behring, the prosecutor in Joe's trial
- Hector Atreyu Ruiz as Heco, a drug addict and member of Billy's crew
- Kanin Howell as Baggy, a member of Billy's crew
- Freddy Bouciegues as Tommy, a member of Billy's crew
- Rich Ceraulo Ko as Owen, Nick's assistant and co-worker at Starfish Capital
- Judith Roberts as Judge Shaw, the judge overseeing Brendan's murder trial

== Production ==
=== Development ===
Brian Garfield, author of the original novel Death Wish, was disappointed with the 1974 film adaptation and subsequently wrote a sequel, 1975's Death Sentence. In 1980, he was hired by the Cannon Group, Inc. to write a film adaptation of Death Sentence to be helmed by the first film's director Michael Winner. However, Menahem Golan and Yoram Globus disliked the second novel and, instead, decided to purchase the rights to Garfield's characters instead of adapting the novel itself. They also purchased the rights to the first film from Dino De Laurentiis and Paramount Pictures. The subsequent film Death Wish II (1982) was strictly a sequel to the first film and bore no relation to Garfield's novel. After James Wan read Garfield's novels and, having seen all the film adaptions, he was inspired to make a film adaptation of the novel. Wan hired Garfield to write the first few drafts for the film, with the final script being written by Ian Mackenzie Jeffers.

=== Casting ===
Kevin Bacon was hired for the role of Nick Hume, at the insistence of Wan. Garrett Hedlund was chosen for the role of Billy Darley, the main villain and leader of the gang. He was asked to shave his head and gain some weight to portray the role. He also watched a documentary about lions to portray Billy's animalistic nature. Aisha Tyler had been cast as Detective Jessica Wallis, who was originally written as a 50-year-old male detective. Other cast members include John Goodman, Kelly Preston, Judith Roberts, and Stuart Lafferty.

=== Filming ===
The film was shot in 2 months. The filming locations included, Columbia, South Carolina and Los Angeles, California. Wan and director of photography John R. Leonetti shot the film on 35mm Kodak Vision2 500T 5218 film in the Super 35 format. In 2022, Wan confirmed in an Instagram post that Death Sentence was his last movie as director to be shot on traditional celluiloid photochemical film as, barring a few scenes for Furious 7 (2015), he would shift to digital photography for his later films starting with Insidious (2010).

== Music ==
The music was composed by Charlie Clouser, who previously collaborated with Wan on Saw (2004) and Dead Silence (2007).

Incidental music includes several bars of "Hey Joe" by Jimi Hendrix, played while Nick is stalking Joe Darley.

== Release ==
=== Home media ===
The film was released on DVD in the United States by 20th Century Fox Home Entertainment on January 8, 2008. It includes an Unrated version and the original theatrical version.

== Reception ==
=== Box office ===
Death Sentence opened in 1,822 theaters in the United States. It grossed $4,231,321, with an average of $2,322 per theater and ranking #8 at the box office. The film ultimately earned $9,534,258 domestically and $7,440,201 internationally for a total of $16,974,459.

=== Critical response ===
On the review aggregator website Rotten Tomatoes, 20% of 113 critics' reviews are positive, with an average rating of 4.2/10. The website's consensus reads: "A nonsensical plot and an absurd amount of violence make this revenge pic gratuitous and overwrought." Metacritic, which uses a weighted average, assigned the film a score of 36 out of 100, based on 24 critics, indicating "generally unfavorable" reviews. Audiences polled by CinemaScore gave the film an average grade of "C" on an A+ to F scale.

Roger Ebert of the Chicago Sun-Times gave the film 2 1/2 stars out of 4. He compared Death Sentence to the Death Wish films starring Charles Bronson, saying: "In the Bronson movies, the hero just looked more and more determined until you felt if you tapped his face, it would explode. In Death Sentence, Bacon acts out a lot more." Ebert called Death Sentence "very efficient", praising "a courtroom scene of true surprise and suspense, and some other effective moments", but concluded that "basically this is a movie about a lot of people shooting at each other".

Scott Tobias of The A.V. Club contends the film is "certainly never boring"; he felt that director James Wan was "too busy jamming the accelerator to realize that his movie's spinning out of control." Matt Zoller Seitz of The New York Times said, "Aside from a stunning three-minute tracking shot as the gang pursues Nick through a parking garage, and Mr. Bacon's hauntingly pale, dark-eyed visage, Mr. Wan's film is a tedious, pandering time-waster." Owen Gleiberman of Entertainment Weekly felt that "[t]he morality of revenge is barely at issue in a movie that pushes the plausibility of revenge right over a cliff." Conversely, Justin Chang of Variety called the film "well-made, often intensely gripping". Similarly, Bill Gibron of PopMatters felt the film was "a significant movie" and "a wonderfully tight little thriller". Darren Amner of Eye for Film also gave the film a positive review, praising Bacon's performance in particular: "[H]is portrayal is emotional, sympathetic and highly aggressive. As a father he is touching and as a stone-cold killing machine he is even more convincing."

Author Brian Garfield, who wrote the novel the film is loosely based on, said of the film: "While I could have done with a bit less blood-and-thunder, I think it's a stunningly good movie. In the details of its story it's quite different from the novel, but it's a movie, not a novel. In its cinematic way it connects with its audience and it makes the same point the book makes, and those are the things that count." He also liked that, like his novels, but unlike the Death Wish film series, it does not advocate vigilantism. Garfield further explained in an interview: "I think that, except for its ludicrous violence toward the end, the Death Sentence movie does depict its character's decline and the stupidity of vengeful vigilantism," adding, "As a story it made the point I wanted it to make."
