= Silence of the Heart =

- DVD cover
- Genre: Drama
- Written by: Phil Penningroth
- Directed by: Richard Michaels
- Starring: Mariette Hartley; Howard Hesseman; Dana Hill; Chad Lowe
- Music by: Georges Delerue
- Country of origin: United States
- Original language: English

Production
- Executive producers: Jon Avnet; Steve Tisch
- Producers: James O'Fallon; David A. Simons
- Production locations: Monrovia High School - 845 W. Colorado Boulevard, Monrovia, California
- Cinematography: Isidore Mankofsky
- Editor: Peter E. Berger
- Running time: 100 minutes
- Production companies: David A. Simons Productions; Tisch/Avnet Productions Inc.

Original release
- Network: CBS
- Release: October 30, 1984

Silence of the Heart is a 1984 American made-for-television drama film starring Charlie Sheen, Chad Lowe, Mariette Hartley, Dana Hill, Howard Hesseman and Silvana Gallardo, directed by Richard Michaels and written by Phil Penningroth.

The film was considered groundbreaking for the time period and heralded a coming trend of films that dealt with teenage suicide, a topic previously not discussed in family film, with an emphasis on the surviving family of a teenager who commits suicide.

== Plot ==
Skip Lewis (Chad Lowe) is a 17-year-old boy who has been having academic problems. A girl named Andrea, whom he has been pursuing, has told him that she has no interest in him. He tries to talk to his parents (Mariette Hartley & Howard Hesseman) about this but can't bring himself to, thinking that they won't understand. He commits suicide by driving his car over a cliff. Now, his parents are in denial saying that his death was an accident. However, his best friend, Ken Cruze (Charlie Sheen) who was the last person he saw before his death, was told by Skip that he was considering killing himself and is feeling guilty that he didn't try to stop him. Skip's sister Cindy (Dana Hill) tries to bring her family out of denial so they can heal.

== Partial cast ==
- Charlie Sheen as Ken Cruze (his first acting role)
- Mariette Hartley as Barbara Lewis
- Dana Hill as Cindy Lewis
- Howard Hesseman as Carl Lewis
- Chad Lowe as Skip Lewis
- Silvana Gallardo as Alice Roberti
- Elizabeth Berridge as Penny
- Alexandra Powers as Andrea
- Ray Girardin as Harris
- Sherilyn Fenn as Monica
- Melissa Hayden as Rachel
- Casey Siemaszko as Jeff
- Jeffrey Lampert as Mr. Bonaducci
- Steve Eastin as Ed Rintal
- Leslie Bega as Cindy
- Rick Fitts as Dan Norlan
- Lynette Mettey as Marilyn Cruze
- Jaleel White as Hanry
- David L. Crowley as Mourner (credited as David Crowley)

== Critical reception ==
The New York Times wrote "In any television project of this sort, the dramatization elements tend to be shaped by requirements usually associated with a how-to manual. This is the problem, we are told, and this is the way to cope with it. Experts are recruited. (Silence of the Heart lists Charlotte Ross, director of the Suicide Prevention and Crisis Center of California's San Mateo County, as technical adviser.) Not infrequently, dramatic clout gets lost in the authenticity shuffle. Fortunately, this is not the case with Silence of the Heart, a David A. Simons Production made in association with Tisch/Avnet Productions. Steve Tisch and Jon Avnet, the executive producers, have been steadily compiling an impressive television record since the release of their film Risky Business and this production gives them still another solid credit. Phil Penningroth's script and Richard Michaels's direction are effectively restrained, avoiding unnecessary melodrama. (The use of a volume of Sylvia Plath's poetry is a trifle pat bud not entirely out of order.)"
