= The Paladin (Garfield novel) =

1979 novel by Brian Garfield

- First edition
- Author: Brian Garfield (in collaboration with Christopher Creighton (pseudonym))
- Language: English
- Genre: Historical novel
- Published: 1979 (Simon & Schuster)
- Publication place: United States
- Media type: Print (hardback)
- Pages: 381
- ISBN: 9780671247041
- OCLC: 5412654

The Paladin is a 1979 historical novel by Brian Garfield. Supposedly based on a true story, it is about a young boy "Christopher Creighton" who befriends Winston Churchill in the mid 1930s and then goes on to take an active role in a number of World War II operations including: informing Churchill in advance of the surrender of Belgium leading to the Dunkirk evacuation, stopping the Americans from being warned of the Attack on Pearl Harbor by sinking the Dutch submarine K XVII, and misleading the Germans about the Normandy invasion.

== Publication history ==
- 1979, USA, Simon & Schuster ISBN 9780671247041
- 1980, England, Macmillan ISBN 9780333266366

== Reception ==
A starred review in Kirkus Reviews of The Paladin wrote "Still, veteran Garfield punches it all out with assured panache: larger-than-life Churchill, exploit after exploit, horror upon horror. So, believe it or not, this is a ripping good yarn--with food for all sorts of WW II-history speculation." The International Churchill Society wrote "His novel is splendid entertainment for the highly committed Churchillian, and you should definitely add a copy to your library of tall tales."

The Washington Post, in its review, disproved a major part of the book posited as true, the sinking of the Dutch submarine K XVII which had seen the Japanese fleet approaching Pearl Harbor, and concluded "The writing moves along at a lively pace, but the characters are so wooden a Gepetto would drool. In sum, it's no Le Carre. Still, it's a substantial cut above, say, Robert Ludlum, whose own novels are equally improbable, but more clearly designated as pure fiction."

Nigel West, in his book Counterfeit Spies (1999), exposed the story as fiction.
