= Death Wish 3 (video game) =

1987 video game

- Publisher: Gremlin Graphics
- Platforms: Amstrad CPC, Commodore 64, ZX Spectrum
- Release: 1987

Death Wish 3 is a video game published by Gremlin Graphics in 1987 for the Amstrad CPC, Commodore 64 and ZX Spectrum. Licensed from the 1985 film, the player controls Paul Kersey in the streets and buildings in a free-roaming, all-out gunfight with gangsters. It was one of the goriest games of its time, featuring multiple weapons with detailed, different damage patterns and the possibility to kill civilians.

== Reception ==
Computer and Video Games said that "Despite the violent nature of Death Wish III, the game is technically excellent with brilliant graphics and a three channel sound track from the film's title music. Some of the screens show graphic gore and lewdness, particularly on the Commodore version, but no doubt others will pass judgement on this Gremlin title — probably without seeing it first. So, all I will say is that it's an excellent game which is shockingly realistic!"

ACE said that "Gremlin have made a good job in creating an amusing action-packed game from a rather limited film license. Though the violence is relentless and gratuitous, nobody's going to take it seriously. Are they? The lasting appeal of the game is doubtful, but its worth checking out if only for its colourful and gory graphics."

Aktueller Software Markt gave the game a rating of 6 overall.

Bill Scolding for Commodore User said that "For all its gratuitous violence, Deathwish III isn't going to corrupt anyone, but merely bore them rigid. In every possible sense, it's a bloody mess."

Happy Computer gave the game a rating of 31 overall.
