= Robert Kya-Hill =

American actor and director (1930–2026)

- Born: Robert Hill; December 4, 1930
- Died: May 31, 2026 (aged 95); New Rochelle, New York, U.S.
- Occupations: Actor, director, playwright, musician, composer, educator

Robert Kya-Hill (né Robert Hill; December 4, 1930 – May 31, 2026) was an American actor, director, playwright, musician, composer and educator. He also performed under the name "Bob Hill". On learning that there was an actor with the same name, he briefly changed his name to Robert Hill II. He then added the prefix "Kya" after joining the Screen Actors Guild in 1961 because a union rule barred members from having the same name.

== Early life and education ==
Kya-Hill's youth on farms in North Carolina and Virginia's Bible Belt country influenced his later works. At the age of 12, he moved to Harlem in New York City with his mother, Fannie Williams Hill, a garment presser. After graduation as a silk screen major from the High School of Industrial Arts in 1948, he worked in the silk screen industry and then attended City College of New York in 1950-51.

Because he loved to sing but could not find a piano accompanist, he taught himself to play the guitar. He also went to music auditions for singing practice because he could not afford lessons. His formal music studies were deferred until after Army service in Germany during the Korean War. He was discharged in 1953 with a National Defense Service Medal and an Army of Occupation Medal Germany.

From 1954 to 1957, he studied at the New York College of Music and Jarahal School of Music in Harlem, where he conducted the Jarahal Concert Chorus for two seasons. At Jarahal, he also became an acting student and then protégé of the vaudeville performer, Lillyn Brown. He also studied with private teachers including Herbert Gellendre, Vinettte Carroll and Carol Vikse. As his interests diversified, so did his mixed-media program credits, sometimes by choice and sometimes by budgetary constraints. In 1991, he earned an M.A in Theater Education from Goddard College in Plainfield, Vermont.

== Professional career ==
Kya-Hill's extensive and diverse career began as a folk musician in 1958 with performances as a guitarist, folk singer, and concert soloist. He appeared in Let My People Go in New York's Town Hall, with Lillyn Brown's one-woman shows in Carnegie Recital Hall, and nightclubs in Manhattan, Connecticut, and New Jersey.

For several years, he appeared as guitarist and actor, including as Gorman in Dark of the Moon, with James Earl Jones in 1959 at Equity Library Theatre in Manhattan. He was billed as Robert Hill II when he appeared as Ketch and guitarist in the 1962 production of Moon on a Rainbow Shawl, at East 11th Street Theater in New York City which starred James Earl Jones and Cicely Tyson. Eventually, his career transitioned to acting, composing, playwriting, directing, then into teaching and back into acting and composing.

By intentionally auditioning for plays with no roles for African Americans, Kya-Hill sought to broaden casting directors' preconceptions and thereby increase employment for blacks. Although Kya-Hill was not often selected for roles, he nevertheless appeared on stages in New York, regionally, and abroad in more than 140 professional productions.

As Bob Hill, he played the lead in Dark Valley, Gospel Films, 1961, and was awarded the "Christian Oscar" by the National Evangelical Film Foundation (NEFF) for Best Actor of the Year. His role as Jericho in Slaves, produced by Theatre Guild Films in 1969 and released by Walter Reade was praised as "excellent" by the Boston Herald. Terry Kay in The Atlanta Journal described him as "a remarkably talented actor," adding "Kya-Hill is the finest actor in the cast, which includes Stephen Boyd, Ossie Davis, and Dionne Warwick." He reveals "a peculiar and magnificent fire, an unleashed freedom of acting 'attack' that breaks the conventions of characteristic posing too often committed by other performers."

In 1969, his performance as Purlie in Purlie Victorious at the Equity Library Theatre in New York earned an Obie Award nomination as best actor. He performed the title role in Othello numerous times, including in Montreal, Vermont, New York City, and Perth, Australia. When cast as a last-minute replacement for Stephen Kumalo, the lead in Lost in the Stars, he learned the entire role and music in only three days before opening night. He has played leading roles in New York City, regional and international theaters. He also performed with touring companies, as Young Dr. Martin Luther King, Jr., written by Alice Childress, and Josef K, a dramatization by Andre Gide and Jean-Barrault of Kafka's The Trial; and with repertory companies such as the American Shakespeare Festival in Stratford, Connecticut.

His play, The Trial of Secundus Generation Blackman vs. Hannah and William Blackman was produced in June 1968 by Theater West in Dayton, Ohio. Writing in the Journal-Herald, Hubert Meeker expressed feeling "the excitement of the submerged Negro culture surfacing in new artistic shape, with the implication in this beginning trickle of a tremendous underground vitality that could break through and revolutionize the American stage." The play was also performed at the Hunter College Playhouse in March 1972 with the shortened title, Blackman vs Blackman. It was directed by Kya-Hill and choreographed by Pearl Primus. Another play, The System, had been submitted to Clarence Young, III, in Dayton in 1968 and later widely performed without his knowledge or being credited. Its performance by Theatre West at the Lincoln Center Community/Street Festival in August 1972 prompted Mel Gussow in his favorable New York Times review to observe, "Although not individually credited in the program, Clarence Young, 3, a playwright, is apparently the man most responsible for the success of The System." Other plays by Kya-Hill that were produced include Guilt the Touch of Death and Nat Turner: Slave.

Kya-Hill's oratorio, The Gospel According to John and …, was premiered in a special performance at Rutgers Presbyterian Church, New York City, on May 19, 1968, with Elizabeth Mosher and Edmond Karlsrud among the soloists. He also composed the film score for Dark Valley and wrote music for his play, Revelation, for the Time is at Hand as well as numerous plays he directed or appeared in, among them J.B., Nat Turner, Moon on a Rainbow Shawl, The Ballad of Joe Smith, Yerma. His music for the 1968 production of Purlie Victorious at the Erie Playhouse in Erie, PA earned high praise in the Erie, PA Times on May 4, 1968: "This was the first 'non-musical' this reviewer has seen where the audience went out humming the music from the show".

He was director of the New York City Festival of the Arts in 1964, presented by the Afro-Arts Cultural Center and sponsored by several New York City agencies. Other credits include The Ballad of Joe Smith, Theater for Peace in New York City. It was reviewed as "masterfully staged by Robert Kya-Hill, who has seized all of the visual and physical implications" and his performance "by far the best in the play." In 1974-75 at the McCree Theatre & Fine Arts Centre in Flint, Michigan, he directed The Revelation of Jesus Christ…for the Time is at Hand, which he also wrote, composed music for, and narrated. The program contains his statement that since theater evolved from the church, "why shouldn't believers use theater to spread the Word … for what is important is not popularity and security, but the salvation of souls." In Perth, Australia, 1975–76, he directed several plays, including a dual cast student production of The Glass Menagerie at the Theatre-Go-Round and Wole Soyinka's The Trials of Brother Jero at the Octagon Theatre with a cast from all over Africa. He also directed Abby Lincoln in The Gingerbread Lady at the Ebony Theater in Los Angeles.

As an educator, he created and taught the first Black Theater studies course at Hunter College, New York City in 1972-74, where he also taught acting in addition to performing and directing. He added playwriting in 1975-76 when he was appointed artist-in-residence at the Western Australian Institute of Technology (now Curtin University). From 1983-99 he taught drama subjects, English and music in New York City's junior and senior high schools, as well as private acting and guitar. After retiring, he returned to the theatre. His work mainly focused on supporting the careers of aspiring actors, playwrights, and filmmakers. He also continued composing music.

== Personal life and death ==
Kya-Hill married his wife Sally in 1966; they had one daughter, Bouqui. He died in New Rochelle, New York, on May 31, 2026, at the age of 95.

== Film and television ==
- 1961: Dark Valley – Jason
- 1969: The Pony Film – Father
- 1969: Slaves – Jericho
- 1970: Edge of Night (TV Series) – Apollo
- 1971: Another World – Frank Chadwick
- 1972: Shaft's Big Score! – Cal Asby
- 1972: Rivals – Second Policeman
- 1973: One Life to Live (TV Series) – Hogan
- 1974: Death Wish – Joe Charles
- 1974: Roots: The Next Generations (TV Mini-Series) – Minister
- 1977: The Court-Martial of George Armstrong Custer (TV Movie) – Henry
- 1978: The Perfect Gentleman – Harry Blount
- 1978: Good Times – J.J.'s boss
- 1978: Lou Grant – Foreign News Editor
- 1978: Eight is Enough (TV Series) – Trucking Company Owner
- 1978: The Critical List (TV Movie) – Judge
- 1980: Sanford Arms – Businessman neighbor
- 1980: Kaz – Ex-Convict
- 1997: Sue Lost in Manhattan – Willie
- 1999: The Shade – Seller
- 2001: Beirut – Minister
- 2012: Celeste and Jesse Forever – Priest
- 2012: The Good Wife – Father

== Stage ==
- 1963: Abe Lincoln in Illinois, as Gobey, Phoenix Theatre, New York City
- 1964: The Beggar's Opera, as Matt, Equity Library Theatre, New York City
- 1966: Winterset, as Shadow, Jan Hus Theatre, New York City
- 1966–67: Lost in the Stars, as Stephen Kumalo; Noah (Wakefield Mystery Plays), as Noah; King Lear, as Kent, Morris Repertory Theatre, Morristown, NJ
- 1967: The Merchant of Venice, as Prince of Morocco; Julius Caesar, as Pindarus, Soothsayer, American Shakespeare Festival, Stratford, CT
- 1968: The Ballad of Joe Smith, as Old Man, Theater for Peace, Playwrights' Workshop Club, NYC
- 1968: Purlie Victorious, as Purlie, Erie Playhouse, Erie, PA
- 1968: The Trial, as Josef K, Vanguard Theater, Pittsburgh, PA
- 1969: Purlie Victorious, as Purlie, Equity Library Theatre, New York City
- 1969: Young Martin Luther King, Jr., as Martin Luther King Jr., Performing Arts Repertory Theatre, 4 -State tour
- 1969: Irma La Douce, as Persil, Dallas Summer Musicals, Dallas, TX
- 1969: Othello, as Othello, Champlain Shakespeare Festival, Burlington, VT
- 1970: The Trial of A. Lincoln, as Lucius Richardson, Hartford Stage Company, Hartford, CT
- 1970: Poetry Now!, as Performer, Periwinkle Productions, multi-state tour
- 1970: Othello, as Othello, Centaur Theatre Company, Montreal, Canada
- 1971: F. Jasmine Addams, as T.T. Williams, Circle in the Square, New York City
- 1972: The Legacy, One-Man Show, Brecht West, Princeton, NJ
- 1973–74: Between Two Worlds, with Maureen Hurley, multi-state tour
- 1974–75: Revelation…for the Time is at Hand, as John, McCree Theatre, Flint, MI
- 1975–76: The Tempest, as Caliban; Othello as Othello, Hayman Theatre, Perth, Australia
- 1981: The Merchant of Venice, as Prince of Morocco, Clarence Brown Theatre, Knoxville, TN
- 1984: The New Mt. Olive Motel, as Sid Ross, J. Pellmann Theatre, Milwaukee, WI
- 1993: Take Me Along, as Dave McComber, Performing Arts Center, Inc., New York City
- 2002: Standard of the Breed, Chuck, The Beckmann Theatre, New York City
- 2002: The Phoenician Women, Kreon/Tutor, The Ohio Theatre, New York City
- 2003: Betty Smith in 1-Act: Vine Leaves, as Mr. Leeper; Freedom's Bird, as Sam; Lawyer Lincoln, as Judge Davis, The Royal Theatre, Williamsburg/Brooklyn, NY
- 2004: Sin Paradise, as Jasper, The Puerto Rican Traveling Theatre, New York City
- 2005: Einstein's Secret Letters, as Paul Robeson, Soho Rep/Walker Space, New York City
- 2005: The Later Medead, as Aegus, Tramway Theatre, Glasgow, Scotland
- 2006: Medea in Aia, Section 1 of The Medead, LMCC Swing Space, New York City
- 2006: The Prostitute of Reverie Valley, as John, Players Loft, New York City
- 2007: Driving Miss Daisy, as Hoke, Riverside Theatre, Vero Beach, FL
- 2007: Flight, as Charlie Parker, Metropolitan Playhouse, New York City
- 2008: The Tunnel, as Old Man, Axial Theatre, Pleasantville, NY
- 2009: Union, as Dr. Jone, Axial Theatre, Pleasantville, NY
- 2010: Shotgun, as Dexter, Florida Studio Theatre, Sarasota, FL
