= Robin Sherwood =

American actress

- Born: 1951 or 1952 (age 74–75)
- Occupations: Actress, model
- Years active: 1972–present

Robin Sherwood (born Robin Cohen; 1951 or 1952) is an American actress, notable for her roles in Tourist Trap (1979), Blow Out (1981), and as the role of Carol Kersey in Charles Bronson's film Death Wish II (1982).

Sherwood was born Robin Cohen, the daughter of Wolfie Cohen and his wife Miriam. She is Jewish, and she has a brother. She began working as a model at age 13. She attended Miami Beach High School. When she was 16 she moved to New York "and found out that I really wanted to be an actress". After taking a course in theater at Sarah Lawrence College, she graduated from Franconia College with a degree in creative writing and drama. During her time at Franconia she performed in repertory theater, school plays, and summer stock.

Sherwood produced the play Voice of the Turtle at the Zephyr Theater in California in 1975.

== Filmography ==
Year	Title	Role	Note
1975	The Love Butcher	Sheila	
1978	Loose Shoes	Biker Chic #2	
1978	Outside Chance	Tootie	TV movie
1979	Tourist Trap	Eileen	
1980	Hero at Large	Lab. Assistant	
1980	Serial	Woman Saltzburger	
1981	Blow Out	Betty	
1982	Death Wish II	Carol Kersey	
2014	Electric Boogaloo: The Wild, Untold Story of Cannon Films	Herself	
