= Vigilante film =

Film genre based on revenge theme

The vigilante film is a film genre in which the protagonist or protagonists engage in vigilante behavior, taking the law into their own hands. Vigilante films are usually revenge films in which the legal system fails protagonists, leading them to become vigilantes. While associated with other genres such as crime, western, or adventure, the vigilante film has also often crossed over in recent years with the superhero genre, due to character origin stories frequently involving an injustice having been committed against them.

== History ==
In United States cinema, vigilante films gained prominence during the 1970s with "touchstones" like Death Wish and Dirty Harry, both of which received multiple sequels. The 1974 film Death Wish has been described as officially starting the genre, causing imitations such as Vigilante Force (1976) or Vigilante (1982), with the most financially successful being The Exterminator (1980).

The Los Angeles Times reported, "Vigilante vengeance was the cinematic theme of the [1970s], flourishing in the more respectable precincts of the new American cinema even as it fueled numerous exploitation flicks," referring to Taxi Driver as a respectable New Hollywood example of the genre in comparison to the multiple exploitation or B film examples produced during the 1970s. It reported in 2009 that such films were making a comeback after "the comparatively prosperous and peaceable 1990s", with examples like Walking Tall (2004), Death Sentence (2007) and Law Abiding Citizen (2009).

== List of films ==
=== Pre-1965 vigilante films ===
Film	Year	Ref.
Tracked by Bloodhounds; or, A Lynching at Cripple Creek	1904	
The White Caps	1905	
The Birth of a Nation	1915	
Judex	1916	
The Adventures of Robin Hood	1938	
The Mark of Zorro	1940	
The Ox-Bow Incident	1943	
The Big Heat	1953	
The Bravados	1958	
The Virgin Spring	1960	
Treasure of Silver Lake	1962	
Youth of the Beast	1963	

=== Late-60s to mid-80s vigilante film wave ===
Film	Year	Ref.
The Sons of Katie Elder	1965	
The Elusive Avengers	1967	
The Born Losers	1967	
Death Rides a Horse	1967	
The Bride Wore Black	1968	
The Wild Bunch	1969	
Cold Sweat	1970	
Joe	1970	
Ned Kelly	1970	
Violent City	1970	
Billy Jack	1971	
Chrome and Hot Leather	1971	
Dirty Harry	1971	
Straw Dogs	1971	
Shaft	1971	
Execution Squad	1972	
Ulzana's Raid	1972	
Female Prisoner 701: Scorpion	1972	
The No Mercy Man	1973	
Coffy	1973	
The Violent Professionals	1973	
Magnum Force	1973	
Revolver	1973	
Robin Hood	1973	
Thriller – A Cruel Picture	1973	
Walking Tall	1973	
What Have They Done to Your Daughters?	1974	
Death Wish	1974	
Street Law	1974	
Foxy Brown	1974	
Three the Hard Way	1974	
The Street Fighter	1974	
The Black Six	1974	
Black Belt Jones	1974	
Act of Vengeance	1974	
The Black Gestapo	1975	
Syndicate Sadists	1975	
The Common Man	1975	
Kidnap Syndicate	1975	
Manhunt in the City	1975	
The "Human" Factor	1975	
The Big Racket	1976	
Taxi Driver	1976	
Colt 38 Special Squad	1976	
Vigilante Force	1976	
Zebra Force	1976	
The Enforcer	1976	
Lipstick	1976	
Strange Shadows in an Empty Room	1976	
Trial by Combat	1976	
Keoma	1976	
The Outlaw Josey Wales	1976	
Mad Dog Morgan	1976	
Brotherhood of Death	1976	
An Average Little Man	1977	
Double Game	1977	
Rolling Thunder	1977	
I Spit on Your Grave	1978	
A Dangerous Toy	1979	
Mad Max	1979	
Defiance	1980	
The Exterminator	1980	
Ms. 45	1981	
Lovely But Deadly	1981	
Death Wish II	1982	
Krodham	1982	
Fighting Back	1982	
1990: The Bronx Warriors	1982	
First Blood	1982	
Burst City	1983	
The Graduates of Malibu High	1983	
The Star Chamber	1983	
Sudden Impact	1983	
Escape from the Bronx	1983	
Vigilante	1983	
Alley Cat	1984	
The Toxic Avenger	1984	
Exterminator 2	1984	
Savage Streets	1984	
Streets of Fire	1984	
Blastfighter	1984	
Death Wish 3	1985	
Naked Vengeance	1985	
The Last Dragon	1985	
Thou Shalt Not Kill... Except	1985	

=== Late 1980s to 2000s ===
Film	Year	Ref.
The Gladiator	1986	
The Seventh Curse	1986	
Death Wish 4: The Crackdown	1987	
Man on Fire	1987	
Rolling Vengeance	1987	
Miami Connection	1987	
Her Vengeance	1988	
I'm Gonna Git You Sucka	1988	
Pumpkinhead	1988	
Traxx	1988	
Batman	1989	
The Punisher	1989	
Darkman	1990	
Total Recall	1990	
Robin Hood: Prince of Thieves	1991	
Escape (1991 film)	1991	
Falling Down	1993	
The Crow	1994	
Dark Angel: The Ascent	1994	
Death Wish V: The Face of Death	1994	
Mr. Payback: An Interactive Movie	1995	
The Expert	1995	
Blood and Donuts	1995	
One Tough Bastard	1995	
Rumble in the Bronx	1995	
A Time to Kill	1996	
Eye for an Eye	1996	
Night Hunter	1996	
Spawn	1997	
Blade	1998	
The Boondock Saints	1999	
Shaft	2000	
Faust: Love of the Damned	2000	
Collateral Damage	2002	
Spider-Man	2002	
Kill Bill	2003	
A Man Apart	2003	
The Hebrew Hammer	2003	
Hellboy	2004	
Walking Tall	2004	
The Punisher	2004	
Man on Fire	2004	
Saw	2004	
Bad Reputation	2005	
Batman Begins	2005	
Constantine	2005	
Sin City	2005	
Anniyan	2005	
Four Brothers	2005	
Saw II	2005	
V for Vendetta	2005	
Munich	2005	
Hard Candy	2006	
Death Note	2006	
Saw III	2006	
El Muerto	2007	
Death Sentence	2007	
The Brave One	2007	
Urban Justice	2007	
Saw IV	2007	
Gutterballs	2008	
Taken	2008	
The Horseman	2008	
The Dark Knight	2008	
Saw V	2008	
Gran Torino	2008	
Punisher: War Zone	2008	
Watchmen	2009	
Inglourious Basterds	2009	
Defendor	2009	
Harry Brown	2009	
Law Abiding Citizen	2009	
The Boondock Saints II: All Saints Day	2009	
Saw VI	2009	

=== 2010s to the present ===
Film	Year	Ref.
Kick-Ass	2010	
22 Bullets	2010	
Super	2010	
Batman: Under the Red Hood	2010	
The Man from Nowhere	2010	
Machete	2010	
13 Assassins	2010	
Saw 3D	2010	
Red: Werewolf Hunter	2010	
Faster	2010	
Drive Angry	2011	
Hobo with a Shotgun	2011	
Drive	2011	
Gallowwalkers	2012	
Scary or Die	2012	
The Amazing Adventures of the Living Corpse	2012	
The Amazing Spider-Man	2012	
The Dark Knight Rises	2012	
Bad Ass	2012	
Taken 2	2012	
Fire with Fire	2012	
The Man with the Iron Fists	2012	
Django Unchained	2012	
The Last Stand	2013	
Snitch	2013	
Prisoners	2013	
Avenged	2013	
Kick-Ass 2	2013	
The Outlaw Michael Howe	2013	
Skin Trade	2014	
John Wick	2014	
John Doe: Vigilante	2014	
In Order of Disappearance	2014	
The Equalizer	2014	
Mr. X	2015	
Taken 3	2015	
Vendetta	2015	
Elle	2016	
I Am Wrath	2016	
The Accountant	2016	
Vengeance: A Love Story	2017	
The Foreigner	2017	
Jigsaw	2017	
Burning	2018	
Peppermint	2018	
The Equalizer 2	2018	
Death Wish	2018	
Mandy	2018	
War	2019	
Rambo: Last Blood	2019	
6 Underground	2019	
Birds of Prey	2020	
Promising Young Woman	2020	
Nobody	2021	
Spiral: From the Book of Saw	2021	
Wrath of Man	2021	
The Protégé	2021	
The Batman	2022	
The Baker	2022	
The Equalizer 3	2023	
Jawan	2023	
Boy Kills World	2023	
The Toxic Avenger	2023	
Saw X	2023	
The Beekeeper	2024	
Monkey Man	2024	
The Crow	2024	
Rebel Ridge	2024	
Locked	2025	
A Working Man	2025	
The Amateur	2025	
The Accountant 2	2025	
Havoc	2025	
From the World of John Wick: Ballerina	2025	
Nobody 2	2025	
Shelter	2026	
Is God Is	2026	
Citizen Vigilante	2026	
The Beekeeper 2	2027	
The Batman: Part II	2028	

== See also ==
- Poliziotteschi – Genre of Italian crime films
- Crime drama – Film genre
- Psychological thriller – Genre combining thriller and psychological fiction
- Rape and revenge film – Film subgenre
- Horror film – Film genre

== Bibliography ==
- Hoppenstand, Gary (1993). "Lethal weapons: The gun as icon in the popular urban vigilante film". In Loukides, Paul; Fuller, Linda K. (eds.). Beyond the Stars 3: The Material World in American Popular Film. Popular Press. ISBN 978-0-87972-623-2.
- Novak, Glenn D. (November 1987). "Social Ills and the One-Man Solution: Depictions of Evil in the Vigilante Film". International Conference on the Expressions of Evil in Literature and the Visual Arts.
