= Silvana Gallardo =

American actress (1953–2012)

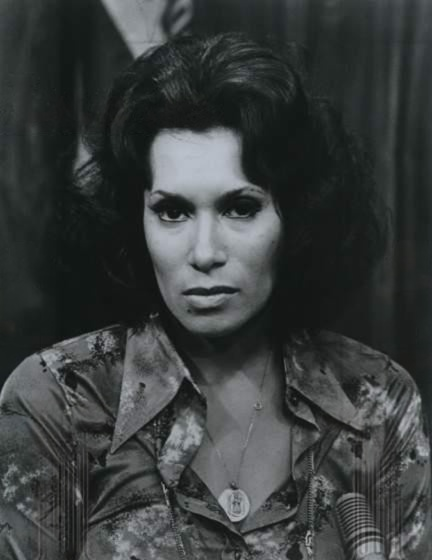
- Gallardo in 1977
- Born: Sandra Silvana Gallardo; January 13, 1953; New York City, U.S.
- Died: January 2, 2012 (aged 58); Louisville, Kentucky, U.S.
- Occupation: Actress
- Years active: 1977–2004
- Spouse(s): Gerald O'Connor (m. 1968; div. 1978) Billy Drago (m. 1985)
- Relatives: Darren E. Burrows (stepson)

Sandra Silvana Gallardo (January 13, 1953 – January 2, 2012) was an American film and television actress, acting coach, and writer.

== Early life and education ==
Gallardo grew up on Fox Street in the South Bronx, daughter of Edward Francis Gallardo and Grace, née Mallory. She was of Puerto Rican, Sicilian, and Cuban descent and proud of her Native American ancestry.

== Career ==
Gallardo's television credits include episodes of Monsters (American TV series), Starsky & Hutch, Lou Grant, Quincy, Hill Street Blues, Cagney & Lacey, Kojak, Falcon Crest, Trapper John, M.D., The Golden Girls, Knots Landing, MacGyver, L.A. Law, Babylon 5, ER and NYPD Blue. She also appeared in films including Windwalker, Death Wish II, and Silence of the Heart.

Gallardo began her teaching career in NYC. She taught and coached some of Hollywood's biggest stars, including Angelina Jolie, Keanu Reeves, Billy Drago and Peta Wilson.

While residing in Paris, Kentucky, Gallardo died on January 2, 2012, at Jewish Hospital, Louisville. A cause of death was not released.

== Personal life ==
In 1968, Gallardo married Gerald O'Connor; they divorced in 1978. She married secondly, in 1985, the actor Billy Drago, who worked with her in presenting workshops for aspiring actors, some being sold on video; they subsequently separated, and she was survived by her partner and collaborator, John Gavigan.

== Filmography ==
Year	Title	Role	Notes
1980	Windwalker	Little Feather	
1982	Death Wish II	Rosario	
1984	Silence of the Heart	Alice Roberti	
1985	Copacabana	Conchita Rivera	
1988	Out of the Dark	McDonald	
1990	Solar Crisis	T.C.	
