= Kevyn Major Howard =

Canadian actor (1956–2025)

- Howard in 2014
- Born: January 27, 1956; Montreal, Quebec, Canada
- Died: February 14, 2025 (aged 69); Las Vegas, Nevada, U.S.
- Occupations: Actor, photographer
- Years active: 1980–1999

Kevyn Major Howard (January 27, 1956 – February 14, 2025) was a Canadian actor and photographer, best known for his role as Private First Class "Rafterman" in Stanley Kubrick's war film Full Metal Jacket (1987).

== Life and career ==
Howard was born in Montreal, Canada on January 27, 1956. After acting in high school, Howard moved to Los Angeles and Hollywood in the late 1970s. His headshot was delivered to Paramount Pictures and, shortly thereafter, he was called in and booked for his first major film role, in Serial, starring Martin Mull. This was followed by his first television appearance in an episode of Trapper John, M.D.. In 1982, Howard appeared as Stomper in Death Wish II and later as Hawkins in Clint Eastwood's 1983 film Sudden Impact, notably making him the only actor to be in both Death Wish and Dirty Harry film series. In 1987, Howard appeared in his most notable role, the combat photographer "Rafterman" in the Vietnam War film Full Metal Jacket directed by Stanley Kubrick. The following year, Howard made an appearance in the episode "Line of Fire" of the TV series Miami Vice. Howard retired from acting in 1999, his final acting credit being in an episode of Crusade.

In the BBC show The Human Face, Howard is described as the "King of the Hollywood headshot" as he became a leading headshot photographer after his retirement from acting.

Howard was active in supporting United States service members, veterans, and first responders. He founded and was president of a non-profit organization called Fueled by the Fallen. The organization honors "fallen heroes" of the United States and its allies, primarily through their commemorative tribute cars (such as racecars and parade cars). In addition to honoring the aforementioned, the organization aims to pay remembrance to victims of 9/11, making good on "a promise to Never Forget."

Howard died in Las Vegas on February 14, 2025, at the age of 69. He had been hospitalized for weeks with respiratory problems.

== Filmography ==
Year	Film	Role	Notes	Ref.
1980	Trapper John, M.D.	Tony	1 episode: S1.E14	
1981	CHiPs	Ted McLeish	1 episode: S5.E4	
1982	Death Wish II	'Stomper'		
1983	T.J. Hooker	J.D.	1 episode: S2.E12	
1983	Cagney & Lacey	Weaver	1 episode: S2.E22	
1983	Scarface	Extra	Uncredited	
1983	Sudden Impact	Hawkins		
1984	The A-Team	Marcus	1 episode: S2.E20	
1986	MacGyver	Sonny	1 episode: S2.E6	
1987	Magnum, P.I.	Kenneth Geiger	1 episode: S7.E17	
1987	Full Metal Jacket	Private First Class 'Rafterman'		
1988	War Party	Calvin Morrisey		
1988	Alien Nation	Rudyard Kipling		
1988	Miami Vice	Bates	1 episode: S5.E6	
1996	Livers Ain't Cheap	Paramedic		
1999	Crusade	Officer	1 episode: S1.E4	
