= Gail Morgan Hickman =

American film producer

- Born: December 14, 1953 (age 71); United States
- Occupation(s): Producer, writer
- Years active: 1976–present

Gail Morgan Hickman (born December 14, 1953) is an American producer and writer of film and television.

His first major writing credit was for the Dirty Harry film The Enforcer (1976). His subsequent screenplay credits include The London Connection (1979), The Kids Who Knew Too Much (1980), The Big Score (1983), Murphy's Law (1986), Number One with a Bullet (1987), and Death Wish 4: The Crackdown (1987).

In 1977, Hickman wrote the nonfiction book The Films of George Pal, a history of the famed science-fiction producer-director's career. He also wrote the novelization for the film The Enforcer (1976) under the pseudonym Wesley Morgan.

From 1988 on, he worked primarily as a television writer-producer for the series Crime Story, The Equalizer, Mancuso, F.B.I., The Flash, P.S. I Luv U, Matrix, One West Waikiki, The Sentinel, Largo Winch, Just Cause and most recently Aaron Stone.

In 1992, he co-wrote the NBC TV mini-series Drug Wars: The Cocaine Cartel for producer Michael Mann.
