= Brian Garfield =

American writer (1939–2018)

- Born: Brian Francis Wynne Garfield; January 26, 1939; New York City, U.S.
- Died: December 29, 2018 (aged 79); Pasadena, California, U.S.
- Occupations: Novelist, screenwriter
- Writing career
- Notable works: Death Wish, Hopscotch
- Notable awards: 1976 Edgar Award for Best Novel

Brian Francis Wynne Garfield (January 26, 1939 – December 29, 2018) was an American novelist, historian and screenwriter. A Pulitzer Prize finalist and Edgar Award recipient, he wrote his first published book at the age of 18. Garfield went on to author more than 70 books across a variety of genres, 19 of which were made into films or TV shows, and sold more than 20 million copies worldwide. His best-known works include Death Wish (1972), which launched a lucrative franchise when it was adapted into the 1974 film of the same title.

== Early life ==
Garfield was born in New York City, the son of George Garfield and Frances O'Brien, a portrait artist and friend of Georgia O'Keeffe. O'Keeffe had introduced the pair. He was the nephew of chorus dancer and stage manager Chester O'Brien, and a distant relative of Mark Twain. He graduated from Southern Arizona School for Boys in Tucson.

== Career ==
A guitarist, in the 1950s, Garfield toured with a band called the Palisades; the band released a single on the Calico label. He served in the U.S. Army and the Army Reserves from 1957 to 1965. He attended the University of Arizona, from which he received a bachelor's degree in English in 1959 and master's degree in English in 1963.

His first novel, Range Justice, written when he was 18, was published in 1960. By the end of the following decade, he had published 60 novels. Garfield continued to publish books once he turned 50, albeit at a less prolific rate.

In 1972 he published Death Wish, which was adapted into the film of the same title. Four movie sequels followed, all starring Charles Bronson in the lead role. Bruce Willis starred in a 2018 remake. Garfield was directly involved only in the original movie. He wrote a sequel, Death Sentence (1975), which was very loosely adapted into the 2007 film of the same name. While the film had a different storyline, it adopted the novel's critical perspective on vigilantism. Hopscotch, also published in 1975, won the Edgar Award for Best Novel. Garfield wrote the screenplay for the 1980 film adaptation starring Walter Matthau, Glenda Jackson and Sam Waterston.

In 1970, Garfield was a finalist for the Pulitzer Prize for History for The Thousand-Mile War: World War II in Alaska and the Aleutians. His last book, published in 2007, was a critical biography of the controversial British intelligence officer Richard Meinertzhagen.

He and his wife Bina divided their time between their homes in Pasadena, California, and Santa Fe, New Mexico. They were supporters of Wildlife WayStation, an animal sanctuary in Southern California.

== Death ==
Garfield died at home in Pasadena in December 2018 at the age of 79. His wife said the cause was complications of Parkinson's disease.

== Legacy ==
John Grisham credited Garfield's 1973 Writer's Digest article "Ten Rules for Suspense Fiction" with "giving him the tools" to write his thrillers. When he died, Lawrence Block tweeted, “RIP Brian Garfield. Fine writer, friend for years”. In 2015, the Georgia O'Keeffe Museum Research Center in Santa Fe announced that Brian Garfield and his wife had given a gift of correspondence between O'Keeffe and Garfield's mother, Frances O'Brien, "that provides insight into the women's shared work ethic, their era and their sense of humor — and shows O'Keeffe's penchant for dashes in her informal notes. The gift includes letters, postcards, interviews and other materials from the 1940s to the 1970s that were collected by O'Brien".

== Pen names ==
- Bennett Garland
- Alex Hawk
- John Ives
- Drew Mallory
- Frank O'Brian
- Jonas Ward
- Brian Wynne
- Frank Wynne

== Works ==
=== Novels ===
Credited to Brian Garfield or Brian Wynne Garfield unless otherwise indicated.
Year	Title	Author Credit	Main Character(s)	Notes
1960	Range Justice		Tracy Chavis	First novel set in fictional town of Spanish Flat, Arizona. Certain characters reappear in the Jeremy Six series. Abridged and reissued as Justice at Spanish Flat (1961).
1961	The Arizonans			
1961	Massacre Basin	Frank Wynne		
1962	The Big Snow	Frank Wynne		
1962	The Rimfire Murders	Frank O'Brian		Contemporary mystery set in Spanish Flat.
1962	Arizona Rider	Frank Wynne		
1962	The Lawbringers			
1962	Trail Drive			
1962	7 Brave Men	Bennett Garland		Lancer and Magnum Books editions (1962) credited to Brian Garfield.
1963	Vultures in the Sun			
1963	Apache Canyon		Justin Harris	
1963	Dragoon Pass	Frank Wynne		
1963	High Storm	Bennett Garland		
1964	The Last Outlaw	Bennett Garland		Magnum Books edition (1964) credited to Brian Garfield.
1964	Rails West	Frank Wynne		
1964	Mr. Sixgun	Brian Wynne	Jeremy Six	First appearance of Marshall Jeremy Six. Set in Spanish Flat, with some characters from Range Justice returning.
1964	Rio Concho	Frank Wynne		
1964	The Vanquished			
1965	Lynch Law Canyon	Frank Wynne		
1965	The Night It Rained Bullets	Brian Wynne	Jeremy Six	
1966	Call Me Hazard	Frank Wynne		
1966	The Lusty Breed	Frank Wynne		First chapter set in Spanish Flat; Jeremy Six appears briefly.
1966	The Wolf Pack	Frank Wynne		
1966	The Last Bridge			
1966	Bugle & Spur	Frank O'Brian	Justin Harris	Later editions credited to Brian Garfield.
1966	The Bravos	Brian Wynne	Jeremy Six	
1967	The Proud Riders	Brian Wynne	Jeremy Six, Tracy Chavis	
1967	A Badge for a Badman	Brian Wynne	Jeremy Six, Tracy Chavis	
1967	Rio Chama	Bennett Garland		
1968	Brand of the Gun	Brian Wynne	Jeremy Six	
1968	Buchanan's Gun	Jonas Ward	Tom Buchanan	Seventh novel in the Tom Buchanan series. Other Buchanan novels were written by William Ard, William R. Cox, and Robert Silverberg (as Jonas Ward).
1968	Savage Guns	Alex Hawk		
1968	Arizona			Ballantine Books edition (1969) credited to Frank O'Brian.
1969	Gundown	Brian Wynne	Jeremy Six, Tracy Chavis	Filmed in 1976 as The Last Hard Men. Not to be confused with later Gun Down written by Garfield.
1969	Big Country, Big Men	Brian Wynne	Jeremy Six	Final Jeremy Six novel written by Garfield. The last book in the series, Gunslick Territory (1973), was written by Dean Owen a.k.a. Dudley Dean McGaughey (as Brian Wynne).
1970	Valley of the Shadow			
1970	Sliphammer			
1970	The Hit			
1970	The Villiers Touch			
1971	What of Terry Conniston?			
1971	Sweeny's Honor			First publication in the U.K. (Coronet, 1974) credited to Frank Wynne.
1971	Gun Down			Reissued as The Last Hard Men as a tie-in to the film adaptation. First publication in the UK (Coronet, 1974) credited to Frank Wynne.
1971	Deep Cover			
1972	Death Wish		Paul Benjamin	Basis for the 1974 film (and its four sequels).
1972	Relentless		Sam Watchman	Basis for the 1977 TV film.
1972	Line of Succession			
1973	Kolchak's Gold			
1973	Gangway!			Collaboration with Donald E. Westlake.
1973	Tripwire			
1974	The Romanov Succession			
1974	The Threepersons Hunt		Sam Watchman	
1975	Death Sentence		Paul Benjamin	Basis for the 2007 film Death Sentence (starring Kevin Bacon and directed by James Wan), which credits Garfield but does not follow the action of the novel.
1975	Hopscotch			Winner of the Edgar Award (Best Novel of the Year). Basis for the 1980 Hopscotch (film). Certain characters reappear in the collection Checkpoint Charlie (1981).
1975	Act of Piracy	Frank O'Brian		
1975	Target Manhattan	Drew Mallory		
1977	Recoil			
1978	Fear in a Handful of Dust	John Ives		Basis for the 1984 film Fleshburn.
1978	Wild Times			Basis for the 1980 TV mini-series.
1979	The Marchand Woman	John Ives		
1979	The Paladin			Collaboration with Christopher Creighton.
1984	Necessity			
1989	Manifest Destiny			
1990	Cemetery Jones and the Tombstone War		Cemetery Jones	After author William R. Cox died, Garfield finished this novel (uncredited).
2003	The Hit and The Marksman			The Hit was originally published in 1970. The Marksman is a novella based on an unproduced screenplay.

=== Short stories ===
Collections:

- Checkpoint Charlie (1981), collection of 12 short stories
- Suspended Sentences (1992), collection of 8 short stories

=== Non-fiction ===
- The Thousand-Mile War: World War II in Alaska and the Aleutians (1969)
- Western Films: A Complete Guide (1982)
- The Meinertzhagen Mystery: The Life and Legend of a Colossal Fraud (2007)

=== Screenplays ===
- The Last Hard Men (1976) - Garfield did uncredited rewrites. Based on his novel Gun Down (1971).
- Hopscotch (1980) - Based on his novel.
- The Stepfather (1987) - Screenplay by Donald E. Westlake, based on a story by Garfield, Westlake, and Carolyn Lefcourt.

== See also ==
- List of Ace Western Double Titles
