= Death Wish (1974 film) =

1974 film by Michael Winner

- Theatrical release poster
- Directed by: Michael Winner
- Screenplay by: Wendell Mayes
- Based on: Death Wish by Brian Garfield
- Produced by: Hal Landers; Bobby Roberts
- Starring: Charles Bronson; Vincent Gardenia; William Redfield; Hope Lange
- Cinematography: Arthur J. Ornitz
- Edited by: Bernard Gribble
- Music by: Herbie Hancock
- Production company: Dino De Laurentiis Corporation
- Distributed by: Paramount Pictures (NA); Columbia Pictures (International)
- Release date: July 24, 1974
- Running time: 94 minutes
- Country: United States
- Language: English
- Budget: $3.7 million
- Box office: $30 million (US/West Germany) $20.3 million (worldwide rentals)

Death Wish is a 1974 American vigilante action-thriller film directed by Michael Winner. The film, loosely based on the 1972 novel of the same title by Brian Garfield and the first installment in the Death Wish film series, stars Charles Bronson as Paul Kersey, alongside Hope Lange, Vincent Gardenia, William Redfield, Kathleen Tolan, Christopher Guest and Jeff Goldblum in his film debut. In the film, Paul Kersey, an architect leading a peaceful life, resorts to vigilantism after his wife Joanna is murdered and daughter Carol Kersey Toby is raped during a home invasion.

At the time of release, Death Wish was criticized for its apparent support of vigilantism and advocating unlimited punishment of criminals. The novel allegedly denounced vigilantism, whereas the film embraced the notion. The film was a commercial success and resonated with the public in the United States, which was experiencing increasing crime rates during the 1970s.

== Plot ==
Paul Kersey is a middle-aged architect living in Manhattan with his wife, Joanna near their adult daughter Carol and her husband Jack Toby. Joanna and Carol are followed home from the grocery store by three muggers who invade the Kersey apartment. Angered the women only have $7, the goons beat and slash Joanna and sexually assault Carol before fleeing. Joanna dies from her injuries. After her funeral, Paul fights off a mugger with a homemade weapon, leaving him both shaken and energized by the encounter.

Paul's boss, Henry Ives, sends him to Tucson to work with real estate developer Ames Jainchill on a residential development project. After target shooting, Ames tells Paul he's impressed with his pistol marksmanship and reveals he was a conscientious objector during the Korean War but served as a combat medic. After a couple of weeks of work, Ames drives Paul to Tucson Airport and places a gift into his checked luggage.

On arrival in Manhattan Paul learns Carol is catatonic and electively mute, refusing to speak to Jack. Paul and Jack commit her to a mental rehabilitation institute in Mill Neck on Long Island. Paul opens Ames' gift to discover a Colt .32 revolver with a box of ammunition. He takes a late-night walk with the loaded gun, and when he's mugged at gunpoint, fatally shoots his attacker. Paul spends weeks walking the city looking for criminals, and kills several criminals in the act of mugging people, or sometimes by luring them into confrontations. Police Inspector Frank Ochoa investigates the vigilante killings, and police narrows down their suspects to a list of men who've had family members killed by muggers or are war veterans.

Carol remains institutionalized, depressed and unable to speak or show affection to Jack. Ochoa's suspicion lands on Paul but District Attorney Peters intervenes before an arrest is made. Peters and Police Commissioner Dryer fear an arrest will bring public attention to the fact that Paul's vigilantism has led to a drastic decrease in street crime, which would encourage anarchism. An incacerated Paul would become a martyr people copy. Ochoa relents, and opts for "scaring him off" instead.

In another encounter, Paul shoots two muggers before being wounded in the leg by a third. He corners him at a warehouse, where he proposes a fast draw contest, then faints because of blood loss. Patrolman Officer Jackson Reilly discovers Paul's gun and hands it to Ochoa, who orders him to forget that he found it. Ochoa visits Paul in hospital and offers to dispose of the revolver in exchange for Paul's permanent exile from New York. Paul agrees, and his company transfers him. He is greeted by company representatives at Chicago Union Station, where he notices hoodlums harassing a young woman. He excuses himself and helps her. As the hoodlums mock him, Paul smiles and points a finger gun at them, implying his vigilantism will continue.

== Cast ==
- Charles Bronson as Paul Kersey
- Hope Lange as Joanna Kersey
- Vincent Gardenia as Inspector Frank Ochoa
- William Redfield as Sam Kreutzer
- Chris Gampel as Henry Ives
- Steven Keats as Jack Toby
- Stuart Margolin as Ames Jainchill
- Stephen Elliott as Police Commissioner Dryer
- Fred J. Scollay as District Attorney Peters
- Kathleen Tolan as Carol Kersey-Toby
- Jack Wallace as Detective Hank
- Robert Kya-Hill as Officer Joe Charles
- Jeff Goldblum as Freak #1
- Christopher Logan as Freak #2
- Gregory Rozakis as Freak #3 (with spraypaint-can)
- Christopher Guest as Officer Jackson Reilly
- Hank Garrett as Andrew McCabe
- Helen Martin as Alma Lee Brown
- Olympia Dukakis as Officer Gemetti
- Marcia Jean Kurtz as Receptionist
- Edward Grover as Lieutenant Briggs
- John Herzfeld as Train Mugger
- Eric Laneuville as Train Station Mugger
- Lawrence Hilton-Jacobs as Park Mugger
- Sonia Manzano as Grocery Clerk
- Tom Hayden as E.R. Doctor
- Al Lewis as Security Guard in Lobby
- Billy Curtis as Newspaper Hawker
- Ken Ackles as Thomas Leroy Marston (uncredited)
- Paul Dooley as Cop at Hospital (uncredited)
- Art Evans as Cop at Precinct (uncredited)
- Robert Miano as Mugger (uncredited)
- William Bogert as Fred Brown (uncredited)

John Herzfeld played the greaser who slashes Paul Kersey's newspaper, while Robert Miano had a minor role as a mugger in the film. Lawrence Hilton-Jacobs, who later co-starred on the television show Welcome Back, Kotter, had an uncredited role as one of the Central Park muggers near the end of the film. It has been rumored that Denzel Washington made his screen debut as an uncredited alley mugger since in a long shot, the actor shown appears to resemble him, but Washington stated that not to be true.

Actress Helen Martin, who had a minor role as a mugging victim who fights off her attackers with a hatpin, subsequently appeared in the television sitcoms Good Times and 227. Christopher Guest made one of his earliest film appearances as Officer Jackson Reilly, a young police officer who finds Kersey's gun. Marcia Jean Kurtz, who played the receptionist at Paul's office, has appeared in multiple roles on the TV series Law & Order. Sonia Manzano, who played Maria Rodriguez on Sesame Street, had an uncredited role as a supermarket checkout clerk.

The film marked Jeff Goldblum's screen debut, playing one of the "freaks" who assaults Kersey's family early in the film. The producers of Death Wish were Hal Landers and Bobby Roberts. Bobby Roberts was also the manager of the rock group Steppenwolf at that time. Apparently, Jeff Goldblum struck up a friendship with Steppenwolf keyboardist, Goldy McJohn, because McJohn once said that Goldblum was his cigarette-mooching pal.

== Production ==
=== Development ===
The film was based on Brian Garfield's 1972 novel of the same name. Garfield was inspired to use the theme of vigilantism following incidents in his personal life. In one incident, his wife's purse was stolen; in another, his car was vandalized. His initial thought each time was that he could kill "the son of a bitch" responsible. He later considered that these were primitive thoughts, contemplated in an unguarded moment. He then thought of writing a novel about a man who entered that way of thinking in a moment of rage and then never emerged from it.

The original novel received favorable reviews but was not a bestseller. Garfield sold screen rights to both Death Wish and Relentless to the only film producers who approached him, Hal Landers and Bobby Roberts. He was offered the chance to write a screenplay adapting one of the two novels, and chose Relentless. He simply considered it the easier of the two to turn into a film. Wendell Mayes was then hired to write the screenplay for Death Wish. He later said "I was immensely intrigued with the book. I must tell you, from the moment I read it, I knew it was going to be a blockbuster because it was coming at just the right time. The outrage at crime in the streets was a big item. It didn't surprise me when I read in the papers later on—I was in London at the time of the opening—that audiences were stamping their feet and screaming in the theaters."

Mayes preserved the basic structure of the novel and much of the philosophical dialogue. It was his idea to turn police detective Frank Ochoa into a major character of the film.

Mayes' early drafts for the screenplay had different endings from the final one. In one, he followed an idea from Garfield. Paul confronts the three thugs who attacked his family and ends up dead at their hands. Detective Frank Ochoa discovers the dead man's weapon and considers following in his footsteps. In another, Paul is wounded and rushed to a hospital. His fate is left ambiguous. Meanwhile, Ochoa has found the weapon and struggles with the decision to use it. His decision is left unclear.

Mayes said "I had a great deal to do with how the film turned out; I could see it in my mind before I put a word on paper. I didn't stick to the book very much. I had to do an awful lot of inventing, which I must say [the author] Brian Garfield was not very happy with. But sometimes novelists are not happy, and there's not much you can do about that."

=== Casting ===
Originally, Sidney Lumet was to have directed Jack Lemmon as Paul and Henry Fonda as Ochoa. Lumet bowed out of the project to direct Serpico (1973), requiring a search for another director. Several were considered, including Peter Medak who wanted Henry Fonda as Paul. United Artists eventually chose Michael Winner, due to his track record of gritty, violent action films. The examples of his work considered included The Mechanic (1972), Scorpio (1973), and The Stone Killer (1973).

The film was rejected by other studios because of its controversial subject matter and the perceived difficulty of casting someone in the vigilante role. Several actors were considered, including Steve McQueen, Clint Eastwood, Burt Lancaster, George C. Scott, Frank Sinatra, Lee Marvin and even Elvis Presley. Winner attempted to recruit Bronson, but there were two problems for the actor. One was that his agent, Paul Kohner, believed the film carried a dangerous message. The other was that the screenplay followed the original novel in describing Paul as a meek accountant, hardly a suitable role for Bronson. "I was really a miscast person," Bronson said later. "It was more a theme that would have been better for Dustin Hoffman or somebody who could play a weaker kind of man. I told them that at the time."

Winner was anxious about his decision to cast Jill Ireland, Bronson's real life wife for the role of Paul Kersey's wife, Joanna Kersey. After Winner told this to Bronson, he said, "No. I don't want her humiliated and messed around by these actors who play muggers. You know the sort of person we want? Someone who looks like Hope Lange.", to which Winner replied, "Well, Charlie, the person who looks most like Hope Lange is Hope Lange. So I'll get her." Ireland later played Kersey's love interest Geri Nichols in Death Wish II. The film project was dropped by United Artists after budget constraints forced producers Landers and Roberts to liquidate their rights. The original producers were replaced by Italian film mogul Dino De Laurentiis.

De Laurentiis convinced Charles Bluhdorn to bring the project to Paramount Pictures. Paramount purchased the distribution rights of the film in the United States market, while Columbia Pictures licensed the distribution rights for international markets, however Paramount also distributed the film in the United Kingdom through Cinema International Corporation, 20th Century-Fox distributed the film in Spain. De Laurentiis raised the $3 million budget of the film by pre-selling the distribution rights.

With funding secured, screenwriter Gerald Wilson was hired to revise the script. His first task was changing the identity of the vigilante to make the role more suitable for Bronson. Paul Benjamin was renamed to Paul Kersey. His job was changed from accountant to architect. His background changed from a World War II veteran to a Korean War veteran. The reason for his not seeing combat duty changed from serving as an army accountant to being a conscientious objector. Several vignettes from Mayes' script were deemed unnecessary and so were deleted.

=== Filming ===
Winner asked for several revisions in the script. Both the novel and the original script had no scenes showing Paul interacting with Joanna. Winner decided to include a prologue depicting a happy relationship and so the prologue of the film depicts the couple vacationing in Hawaii. The early draft of the script had Paul being inspired by seeing a fight scene in the Western film High Noon. Winner decided on a more elaborate scene, involving a fight scene in a recreation of the Wild West, taking place in Tucson, Arizona.

The final script had Paul making an occasional reference to Westerns. While confronting an armed mugger, he challenges him to draw. Paul tells him to "fill your hand," the same challenge issued by Western movie icon John Wayne to his main opponent in the climactic shootout in 1969's True Grit. When Ochoa tells him to get out of town, he asks if he has until sundown to do so. The killing in the subway station was supposed to remain off-screen in Mayes' script, but Winner decided to turn this into an actual, brutal scene. A minor argument occurred when it came to a shooting location for the film. Bronson asked for a California-based location so that he could visit his family in Bel Air, Los Angeles. Winner insisted on New York City and De Laurentiis agreed. Ultimately, Bronson backed down.

Death Wish was shot on location in New York City from January 14, 1974 to mid-April 1974. Death Wish was first released to American audiences in July 1974. The world premiere took place on July 24 in the Loews Theater in New York City.

== Music ==
Multiple Grammy award-winning jazz musician Herbie Hancock produced and composed the original score for the soundtrack to the movie. It was his third film score, after the 1966 movie Blow-up and The Spook Who Sat By The Door (1973). Producer Dino De Laurentiis initially wanted "a cheap English band" to score the film, but Winner's then-girlfriend Sonia Manzano gave Winner a copy of Head Hunters, which prompted the director to offer Hancock the job. Using synthesizers, Hancock performed much of the music himself, and the orchestral pieces he wrote were arranged and conducted by Jerry Peters.

== Release ==
=== Home media ===
The film was first released on VHS, Betamax and LaserDisc in 1980. It was later released on DVD in 2001 and 2006. A 40th Anniversary Edition was released on Blu-ray in 2014.

== Reception ==
=== Box office ===
The film grossed $22 million in the United States and Canada generating theatrical rentals of $8.8 million. In West Germany, it grossed over $7.6 million. It earned theatrical rentals of $20.3 million worldwide.

=== Critical response ===
Death Wish received mixed reviews from critics upon its release.

Many critics were displeased with the film, considering it an "immoral threat to society" and an encouragement of antisocial behavior. Vincent Canby of The New York Times was one of the most outspoken writers, condemning Death Wish in two extensive articles. Roger Ebert awarded three stars out of four and praised the "cool precision" of Winner's direction but did not agree with the film's philosophy. Gene Siskel gave the film two stars out of four and wrote that its setup "makes no attempt at credibility; its goal is to present a syllogism that argues for vengeance, and to present it so swiftly that one doesn't have time to consider its absurdity."

Charles Champlin of the Los Angeles Times called it "a despicable motion picture... It is nasty and demagogic stuff, an appeal to brute emotions and against reason." Gary Arnold of The Washington Post described the film as "simplistic to the point of stasis. Scarcely a single sensible insight into urban violence occurs; the killings just plod [along] one after another as Bronson stalks New York's crime-ridden streets." Clyde Jeavons of The Monthly Film Bulletin wrote: "Superficially, it's not all that far removed from a Budd Boetticher revenge Western ... The difference, of course, is that Michael Winner has none of Boetticher's indigenous sense of allegory or his instinct for what constitutes a good folk-mythology, let alone his relish for three-dimensional villains."

Garfield was also unhappy with the final product, calling the film "incendiary" and stated that the film's sequels are all pointless and rancid since they advocate vigilantism unlike his two novels, which make the opposite argument. The film led him to write a follow-up titled Death Sentence, which was published a year after the film's release. Bronson defended the film and felt that it was intended to be a commentary on violence and was meant to attack violence, not romanticize it.

On Rotten Tomatoes, Death Wish has an approval rating of 66% based on reviews from 32 critics. The website's critics consensus reads, "Death Wish is undeniably exploitation fare -- and also undeniably effective." On Metacritic it has a weighted average score of 51% based on reviews from 7 critics, indicating "mixed or average" reviews.

=== Year-end lists ===
The film is recognized by American Film Institute in these lists:

- 2001: AFI's 100 Years...100 Thrills – Nominated
- 2003: AFI's 100 Years...100 Heroes & Villains:
  - Paul Kersey – Nominated Hero

== Impact and influence ==
Death Wish was a watershed for Bronson, who was 52 years of age at the time, and who was then better known in Europe and Asia for his role in The Great Escape. Bronson became an American film icon, who experienced great popularity over the next twenty years.

- In the series' later years, the Death Wish franchise became a subject of parody for its high level of violence and the advancing age of Bronson (a 1995 sixth season episode of The Simpsons, "A Star Is Burns," showed a fictional advertisement for Death Wish 9, consisting of a bed-ridden Bronson voiced by Hank Azaria saying "I wish I was dead").
- In 2019, during the seventy-fourth session of the United Nations General Assembly, Pakistan's Prime Minister Imran Khan referred to Death Wish while explaining the possibility of radicalization of Kashmiri youth as a result of the Indian revocation of Jammu and Kashmir's special status, part of the Kashmir conflict.

== Franchise ==
=== Sequels ===
Four sequels, titled Death Wish II, Death Wish 3, Death Wish 4: The Crackdown, and Death Wish V: The Face of Death, were released in 1982, 1985, 1987, 1994.

=== Remake ===
In March 2016, Paramount and MGM announced that Aharon Keshales and Navot Papushado would direct a remake starring Bruce Willis. In May, Keshales and Papushado quit the project, after the studio failed to allow their script rewrites. In June, Eli Roth signed on to direct. The film was released on March 2, 2018.

== See also ==
- Death Wish film series
- List of American films of 1974
- List of hood films
- List of films featuring home invasions
- Il giustiziere di mezzogiorno, a Death Wish parody film
