= Death Sentence (novel) =

1975 novel by Brian Garfield

- First edition cover
- Author: Brian Garfield
- Language: English
- Genre: Crime fiction
- Publisher: M. Evans
- Publication date: 1975
- Publication place: United States
- Media type: Print (hardback and paperback)
- Pages: 209
- ISBN: 0-87131-198-4
- Preceded by: Death Wish

Death Sentence is a 1975 novel by American author Brian Garfield, the sequel to Death Wish.

== Plot introduction ==
Six months after Death Wish, Paul Benjamin has moved from New York City to Chicago after the death of his catatonic daughter, the result of the brutal attack that transformed him into a vigilante. The only thing that distracts him from his renewed vendetta against crime is a beautiful woman, whom he starts dating.

As he leads the double life, a copycat vigilante begins stalking the streets, using a distinctive .45 caliber Luger pistol. Vigilantism soon becomes a rallying cry for the city as the police search for their man before innocent people are hurt. Now, Paul is not after criminals or even justice but a man who is as dangerous as he himself has become.

== Film adaptation ==
Death Wish II (1982) borrows some elements from the book; however, it contrasts with the book's storyline, characters and setting. In 2007, a film based on the novel, though a completely different storyline, was made, starring Kevin Bacon and directed by James Wan.

== Characters ==
- Paul Benjamin – After leaving New York, Paul moves to Chicago to start a new life, but continue his war as he hunts the streets of his new home.
- Irene Evans – Paul's new love and a lawyer, she gave up her smoking habit and is Paul's girlfriend, which is the reason of his utter distraction.
- Harry Chisum – Irene's former mentor, he suspects Paul being the "Chicago vigilante" to the point on confronting him in his home and explaining why he must end it at once.
- Orson Pyne – A college professor, he is killing in the same manner as Paul.
- Truett – This gun owner sold two guns to Paul and one to Orson.
- Jim Splater – Paul's new employer, he introduces Paul to Chicago.
- Michael Ladlow – Chicago local
- Dan O'Hara – Chicago local
- Captain Victor Mastro – A detective, he is investigating the murders of the muggers.
- Captain William Marlowe – Also a detective, he is investigating the muggers' deaths with Mastro.
- John Childress – one of Paul's previous co-workers
- Joseph Crubb – a dangerous teenager whom Paul stalks for two days before finally tracking down and shooting him
- Lloyd Marks – fell into trouble when he encountered a mugger with his daughter, but was saved by Paul, who shot the mugger.
- Joanne Marks – The blind daughter of Lloyd Marks, she was threatened by the mugger, but was saved by Paul, who shot the mugger before he could do any harm to her.

== Creation ==
Garfield was inspired to write this novel sequel because he was so disappointed in the 1974 film adaption, he described it as "incendiary". He felt upset that the film's audience was encouraged by the violence and vigilantism, despite the story being against both topics in his book, in which Charles Bronson agrees with. Garfield thought that Bronson was miscast as Paul Kersey because as soon as the action-star appeared on screen, Garfield commented "you knew he was going to start blowing people away", which ruins the entire plot-twist of his story for the audience who have never read the book version. Director Michael Winner dismissed the author's criticisms, calling him an "idiot".

Paul was originally depicted in the novel as something of a pacifist weakling with no previous life experience dealing with issues of revenge or violence. Winner wanted Bronson for the role. Bronson noted that, given he was really known better as a customary Hollywood tough guy, he was ill-suited for the part, saying, "I was really a miscast person. It was more a theme that would have been better for Dustin Hoffman or somebody who could play a weaker kind of man. I told them that at the time." The screenplay went through several writers and revisions to better adapt the role for Bronson.
