= Death Wish (novel) =

1972 novel by Brian Garfield

- First edition cover
- Author: Brian Garfield
- Language: English
- Genre: Crime; Drama; Thriller
- Publisher: David McKay
- Publication date: 1972
- Publication place: United States
- Media type: Print (Hardback and Paperback)
- Pages: 160
- ISBN: 0-679-50299-8
- Followed by: Death Sentence

Death Wish is a 1972 novel by Brian Garfield. A sequel novel, Death Sentence, was published in 1975.

== Plot ==
Middle-aged CPA Paul Benjamin lives in Manhattan with his wife Esther in an apartment close to their daughter Carol and her husband, Jack Tobey. Paul is a staunch liberal, volunteering his time to civic organizations and trying to rationalize the crime and misery he witnesses on a daily basis. He refuses to move out of the city, explaining that while the suburbs might be safer and cleaner, he cannot leave New York after having lived there his entire life.

One day, Paul gets a call at work from Jack telling him to come to the hospital. There, a patrolman explains that three junkies broke into Paul's apartment and assaulted Esther and Carol, beating his wife to death before stealing Paul's television and fleeing. Carol is still alive, but in a vegetative state and can no longer meaningfully interact with anyone.

After his wife's funeral, Paul refuses to leave his apartment, has new locks put on the doors, and starts carrying a club made from a sock stuffed with quarters in his pocket. He sheds his previous beliefs. Everyone he sees is now either a potential criminal or unproductive, useless "cattle". Paul gradually aligns himself with the conservative viewpoints of his co-workers, unnerving them.

The changes in his personality and behavior alienate Paul from his son-in-law, who disagrees with Paul's contention that since the police are not making any headway with Esther's case, they ought to hunt down her murderers themselves. According to Jack, vigilantism is not a real solution to crime, and Paul is not doing himself any favors by obsessing over the attacks. When Paul asks for help obtaining a permit to carry a gun, Jack refuses. Paul appears to give in, returning to his old job and even accepting a dinner invitation from his friend Sam.

One night, while walking home drunk, Paul is threatened with a knife by a teenage boy. Furious, Paul pulls out his club and tries to kill the boy, who runs away in terror. Paul later accepts an offer from his boss to go to Tucson to work on a business merger between two rival companies. He has sexual intercourse with Shirley, a woman whom he meets in a bar, visits a sporting goods shop, purchases a revolver and smuggles it back into New York along with a large stash of ammunition.

Meanwhile, Carol's condition has deteriorated to the point where she can no longer feed, wash, or take care of herself. Paul reluctantly signs off on Jack's plan to have her placed in a mental institution. He then purchases a jacket, hat, and gloves and starts looking for criminals, deliberately presenting himself as a harmless, affluent old man in order to attract attention. Paul is eventually held up by a junkie and shoots him three times.

Over the next weeks, Paul keeps up the pretense of being his usual self by going to work and attending social events while discreetly continuing his vigilante activities. He shoots another mugger and a man he catches burglarizing an apartment. He tries more sophisticated tactics, renting a car and leaving it unoccupied with a sign reading "Out of Gas" on the windshield. When two thieves show up to strip the car for parts, Paul shoots them both.

Paul's actions lead to him being dubbed "the vigilante" in the press, and divides the public over whether his killings are justified. The police declare him a menace. A magazine runs an article where a psychiatrist accurately describes Paul's motivations and personal history, and states that if he is insane, it is because he is acting against social norms that prevent ordinary people from acting on their base desires for revenge. One night, Paul shoots at a group of young people throwing bricks and rocks at a subway train. While hunting for his quarry, a beat cop stumbles onto the scene and recognizes Paul as the vigilante. Unwilling to commit suicide, Paul is about to surrender when the cop tips his hat and walks away. Paul finishes his work and quietly heads home.

== Characters ==
- Paul Benjamin – The protagonist. A 47-year-old certified public accountant and a "bleeding-heart" left-wing enthusiast, Paul slowly begins to turn to vigilantism and right-wing enthusiasm after his family is brutally mugged. Having served in World War II as a clerk-typist, he has military training and quickly becomes an effective assassin with his .32 Smith & Wesson as his firearm of choice.
- Esther Benjamin – Paul's wife. Little is known about her except that she met Paul back in high school. She and her daughter are attacked in their apartment by three men, and Esther is beaten to death.
- Carol Benjamin Tobey – Paul and Esther's 23-year-old daughter and wife of lawyer Jack Tobey. After the beating from the muggers, her mental state deteriorates; the book ends with her being institutionalized.
- Jack Tobey – Paul's son-in-law who works as a defense attorney. In contrast to his father-in-law, Jack is pragmatic, arguing against vigilantism and trying to convince Paul that he should just find a way to live with Esther's death.
- Sam Kreutzer – Paul's best friend at work.
- Adele Kreutzer – Sam's wife.
- Henry Ives – Paul's boss, who sends him to Arizona.
- Bill Dundee – An accountant who works in Paul's office and often spouts right-wing views.
- George Eng – An Asian-American, possibly of a Chinese descent, businessman and client of Paul's.
- John Childress – One of Paul's co-workers.
- Lieutenant Malcolm Briggs – The apathetic lead investigator on Esther and Carol's case.
- Inspector Frank Ochoa – The detective who leads the investigation into Paul's activities as the "vigilante".
- Officer Joe Charles – A patrolman who informs Paul of Esther's murder.
- Ira Nermserman – One of Paul's clients.
- Thomas Leroy Marston – A heroin junkie and the first criminal Paul murders as the vigilante.
- Ames Jainchill – A client of Paul's doing business with George Eng.
- Shirley Mackenzie – A woman Paul has a one-night stand with in Tucson.

== Film adaptations ==
A feature film based on the novel was made in 1974, starring Charles Bronson in the lead role as Paul Benjamin, the surname being changed to Kersey and his profession being an architect, and directed by Michael Winner. A 2018 remake, starring Bruce Willis in the lead role, also named "Kersey" and profession being changed to surgeon, was by Eli Roth.

== 1975 sequel novel ==
In 1975, Garfield was inspired to write the book sequel Death Sentence, because he was so disappointed in the 1974 film adaption. He described it as "incendiary", because he felt upset that the film's audience was encouraged by the violence and vigilantism, despite the story being against both topics in his book, in which Charles Bronson agreed with. Garfield thought that Bronson was miscast as Paul Kersey, because when the action-star appeared on screen, Garfield commented "you knew he was going to start blowing people away", which spoiled the plot-twist of his story for the audience who had never read the book. Director Michael Winner dismissed the author's criticisms, calling him an "idiot".

Paul was originally depicted in the novel as something of a pacifist weakling, with no previous life experience dealing with issues of revenge or violence. Winner wanted Bronson for the role. Bronson noted that, given he was really known better as a customary Hollywood tough guy, he was ill-suited for the part, saying, "I was really a miscast person. It was more a theme that would have been better for Dustin Hoffman or somebody who could play a weaker kind of man. I told them that at the time." The screenplay went through several writers and revisions to better adapt the role for Bronson.
