= All About Eve (disambiguation) =

All About Eve is a 1950 film starring Bette Davis and Anne Baxter.

All About Eve may also refer to:

== Music ==
- All About Eve (band), an English rock band
  - All About Eve (album), the first album by the band
- All About Eve, a PJ Harvey album released in 2019, the score to a stage adaptation of the 1950 film
- "All About Eve", a song by Marxman
- "All About Eve", a song by Steve Vai from Fire Garden
- "All About Eve", a song by The Wedding Present from George Best

== Television ==
- All About Eve (South Korean TV series), a 2000 South Korean drama
  - All About Eve (Philippine TV series), a 2009 adaptation of the Korean series
- "All About Eve", an episode of the American SF drama Earth 2
- "All About Eve", an episode of the American sitcom Eve
- "All About Eve", an episode of the American sitcom Last Man Standing
- All About Eve, a 1994 TV documentary about Eve van Grafhorst
- "All About Eve" (Supergirl), an episode of Supergirl
