= A Shared House =

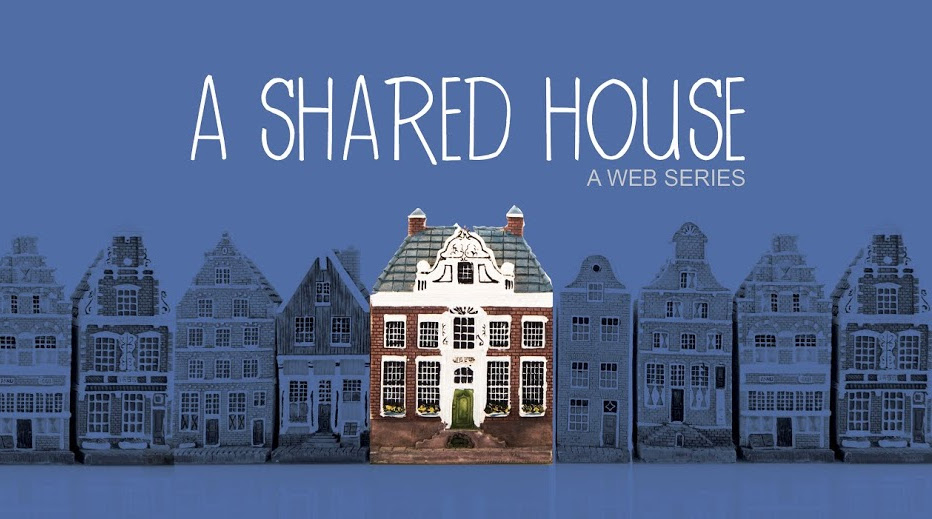
- Genre: Sitcom
- Created by: Georgia Woodward and Joshua Lundberg
- Written by: Joshua Lundberg
- Starring: Georgia Woodward; David Halgren; Grace Avery; Sonny - Joe Flanagan; Lauren Rowe
- Composer: Joseph Giuffrida
- Country of origin: Australia
- Original language: English
- No. of seasons: 2(To date)
- No. of episodes: 8 (To date)

Production
- Producers: Georgia Woodward; Joshua Lundberg; Barking Mouse
- Production locations: Set in Sydney; Filmed at Sydney, Australia
- Camera setup: Single-camera (4 episodes)
- Running time: 15-18 minutes

Original release
- Network: YouTube
- Release: 13 November 2015

A Shared House is an Australian online sitcom created by Georgia Woodward and Joshua Lundberg. The series follows Charlotte, a dissatisfied woman in search of her identity, who is stuck with a house under lease and a stack of bills when her long-term boyfriend, Oscar, leaves her. With new housemates – Lucas, Michael, and Liz moving in, the series explores the experience of a bunch of dysfunctional people living in share houses.

The series stars Georgia Woodward, David Halgren, Grace Avery and Sonny-Joe Flanagan. All four episodes were directed by Joshua Lundberg.

The series is available on YouTube and Vimeo On Demand.

All four episodes of Season One were released on 13 November 2015. Unlike most web series at the time all four episodes in the Season were released on the same day to take advantage of the tendency for audiences to binge watch.

A Shared House Season One received international critical acclaim, winning Outstanding Writing in a Comedy Series at the LA Web Festival, as well as earning nominations for Outstanding Actor and Actress awards for Georgia Woodward and David Halgren. It was titled "The Best Web Series of 2015" by web critic – WEB SERIES 2 WATCH (WHAT U WANT TO WATCH), and received a 9/10 Rating by The AU Review.

A Shared House episodes were produced in a single-camera setup and were filmed in Sydney.

In early 2016, Season 2 was announced and released in December 2016 on YouTube.

== Development and production ==
=== Conception ===
In 2014 Lundberg was shooting a short film titled Unmanned in which Woodward was the lead actress. The two felt they worked well together: "We had always shared a similar sense of humor – I thought he was a visionary Director; he’s one of those very rare ‘actors Director." Woodward reached out to Lundberg in January 2015 over a coffee to discuss the possibility of making a comedy series.

Woodward felt that it was an incredible time to be making online content with the rise of the web series format: "creators are able to make the shows they want to make without waiting for the phone to ring". Joshua had been working in the online space for a number of years, working as both a creative and producer.

The two began writing and developing the series through early 2015. Lundberg was studying at The International Film School in Sydney and had two other major projects he was working on, "Operation Eldridge" and "The Last Brush". Georgia was 6 months into an acting degree at Sydney Theatre School. She dropped out in July 2015, shortly after shooting A Shared House. "I had a gut feeling that this show would be a game changer and I needed to wholeheartedly participate, I have never regretted it."

=== Filming ===
==== Season One ====
Shooting commenced in July 2015. The first season was filmed in Haberfield in the Inner-West of Sydney. The house was a lent to the production crew. The shooting took place over 10 days.

Joshua and Cinematographer Brenton Cassidy, chose to work with the Canon 5D Mark II. The series was shot in 1080p HD video using custom Magic Lantern firmware configurations.

==== Season Two ====
The second season, production had changed the main location of the house to a larger, more up market set. The house was located in Chippendale in Sydney.

Additional filming locations for Michael's bike shop was shot at Ride In Workshop in Balgowlah on Sydney’s North Shore. The bowling alley in Episode 3 was shot at Bateau Bay Ten Pin Bowl on the Central Coast, NSW. Additional park scenes were filmed on Sydney’s Northern Beaches and at Macquarie University

=== Music ===
Season One Season One features as 'jaunty' jass score composed by Joseph Giuffrida.

Season Two Season Two features a jazz score and original music composed by Wesley Chapman.

== Cast and characters ==
The plot of A Shared House follows characters Charlotte, Michael, Lucas, and Liz who all live in a share house previously owned by Charlotte and her ex-boyfriend Oscar.

=== Main ===
- Georgia Woodward as Charlotte, a dissatisfied mid-twenties woman. Unlucky in life and love, she hides her feelings behind obsessive hobbies like hoarding collectibles.
- David Halgren as Michael, a caring former addict of clubbing in the early 2000s. He is the eldest of the group. Michael is a quick-witted, confident gay man who moves into Charlotte's townhouse after a bad break up. He runs a successful bike shop.
- Grace Avery as Liz, a cynical, introverted woman who develops a loathing for Charlotte.
- Sonny-Joe Flanagan as Lucas, a classic 'entrepreneur', obsessed with materialism and financial success. He spends hours around the house searching for his latest app idea, much to the annoyance of housemates.

=== Additional ===
==== Season One ====
- Lauren Rowe as Emma, Charlotte's flirtatious, fun-loving best friend, who cares little for Charlotte's issues but pretends to listen.
- Nick Dale as Oscar, a career-focused man who is impatient with Charlotte's erratic soul searching.

==== Season Two ====
- Elias Jamieson Brown as Tom, Charlotte's estranged free-spirited nomad brother who shows up at the house unexpectedly at the end of the first season.
- Deborah An as Angel, Lucas' energetic and quirky love interest in the season two.

=== Casting ===
Georgia Woodward and Joshua Lundberg cast the series. It was decided in the early stages of development that Woodward would portray Charlotte, although she had doubts in playing the role; she wanted to re-cast right up until the week before shooting commenced. Woodward now refers to playing Charlotte as one of the greatest decisions she's made in her career to date – "She’s a moody little firecracker and it’s a joy to play her".

The first character to be cast was Sonny-Joe Flanagan who came in to audition and Woodward felt like she had "met Lucas for the first time". The next actor to be cast was David Halgren who auditioned for the role of Michael. The character of Liz had already been offered to an actress but not confirmed. However, after meeting Grace Avery, Woodward asked if she would come in and read for the part. Both Lundberg and Woodward felt that Avery was excellent in the role of Liz and gave her " compelling emotional depth and humor".

== Series overview ==
=== Season 1 ===
Season 1 was released worldwide on 13 November 2015, on YouTube. The Season begins in the middle of a blow-up between Charlotte and Oscar where Oscar is confronting Charlotte about how much money she spends on buying bonsai trees. The argument ends with Oscar leaving and Charlotte left standing in the living room.

Charlotte, whilst nursing a lost identity and a broken heart begins a shaky search for housemates. Meeting a whole bunch of applicants along the way. Eventually, Charlotte decides on Michael, Lucas and Liz and the three move in on Saturday.

Charlotte has never lived with housemates before and finds the move in situation confronting to which she takes refuge in her backyard with three jugs of cocktails.

Season 1 follows Charlotte as she is confronted by the housemates as they ask her to throw away all her collectibles in order to make more space.

Over course of Season One, the housemates have two group hangs: a dinner party in episode 4 where Michael brings over a potential collaborator for Charlotte and when Charlotte's friend Emma comes over for a movie night in Episode 2 which results in a clash of perspectives on homosexuality and representation in film.

The Season finale Lucas is stuck for an idea for a new app to which he seeks advice from Michael about his creative process. Lucas goes to the toilet reading Forbes and discovers his creative genius comes alive in the toilet. He then refuses to leave the toilet, heightening anxiety for Charlotte, which entertains Liz and confuses Michael.

Charlotte, Michael, and Liz remain locked out of the toilet until Charlotte breaks in only to find out that the door was unlocked the whole time.

Charlotte is on a mission – she feels she has found what she wants to do with her life. Michael invites his designer friend Lucy over to dinner with all the housemates.

Charlotte is eager to walk a new path, Lucas hits on Emma, Liz turns to gin in disgust and Michael is again puzzled.

The Season One finale ends open-ended with a knock at the door in the middle of the dinner party, that Charlotte answers and the person behind the door aren't revealed.

=== Season 2 ===
Season Two was released in December 2016. The series was back by Sydney production company, Comedy & Co and Australian Improvisation Company, Laugh Masters Academy. They also received financing from their audience via a three-month-long crowdfunding campaign. Despite the second season having more financial backing, the series received less viewership online.

The series begins nine months since the unexpected arrival of Charlotte's estranged brother, Tom. The house is being renovated by its owner and the housemates are living amongst the build.

Charlotte is about to complete an interior design course and is working on a major assignment with her vivacious client, Helen - played by Lyn Collingwood.

Michael has hired Lucas as an apprentice in his bicycle shop however things aren't going to plan as Michael can't get Lucas to sell any bikes.

Michael is hiding a secret relationship with Tom and when Tom lights Charlotte's model home on fire for her final assessment, Michael races home to help fix the mess. Whilst Michael leaves Lucas to run the shop for the afternoon he meets, Angel.

Charlotte comes home to find the model home completely destroyed and discovers Tom is to blame. The two have an argument and Charlotte kicks Tom out of the house.

Charlotte, feeling down, drowns her sorrows by watching reruns of her favorite late-night videos of Russian personal trainer - Sven. Charlotte and Liz bond over their mutual love of Sven.

Turning her attention toward personal growth, Charlotte arranges a private session with Sven and arranges a fun night out with the housemates at the bowling alley. Whilst she is finishing up her session with Sven she takes a call from her friend Emma and Sven mistakenly thinks Charlotte has invited him to the bowling alley.

Sven arrives at the bowling alley, Liz is furious that Charlotte was seeing Sven behind her back. Tom is harassing Michael for money to get out of Sydney and Charlotte stumbles on Michael and Tom, discovering they have been seeing each other behind her back.

At the beginning of the series final Charlotte and Michael aren't talking. Over breakfast, they hear the tap in the kitchen making a strange sound, as they approach it the tap bursts and the two are stuck holding the water pipe shut until help arrives.

Meanwhile, Liz is ignoring Charlotte's calls as she is taking classes with Sven. Lucas is off with Angel on a date-keeping Charlotte and Michael stuck in the house all day.

Sven and Liz arrive home only to find Charlotte and Michael on the ground covered in water. Charlotte and Michael resolve their disagreement and the housemates and new found partners have a dinner party.

== Reception ==
=== Critical ===
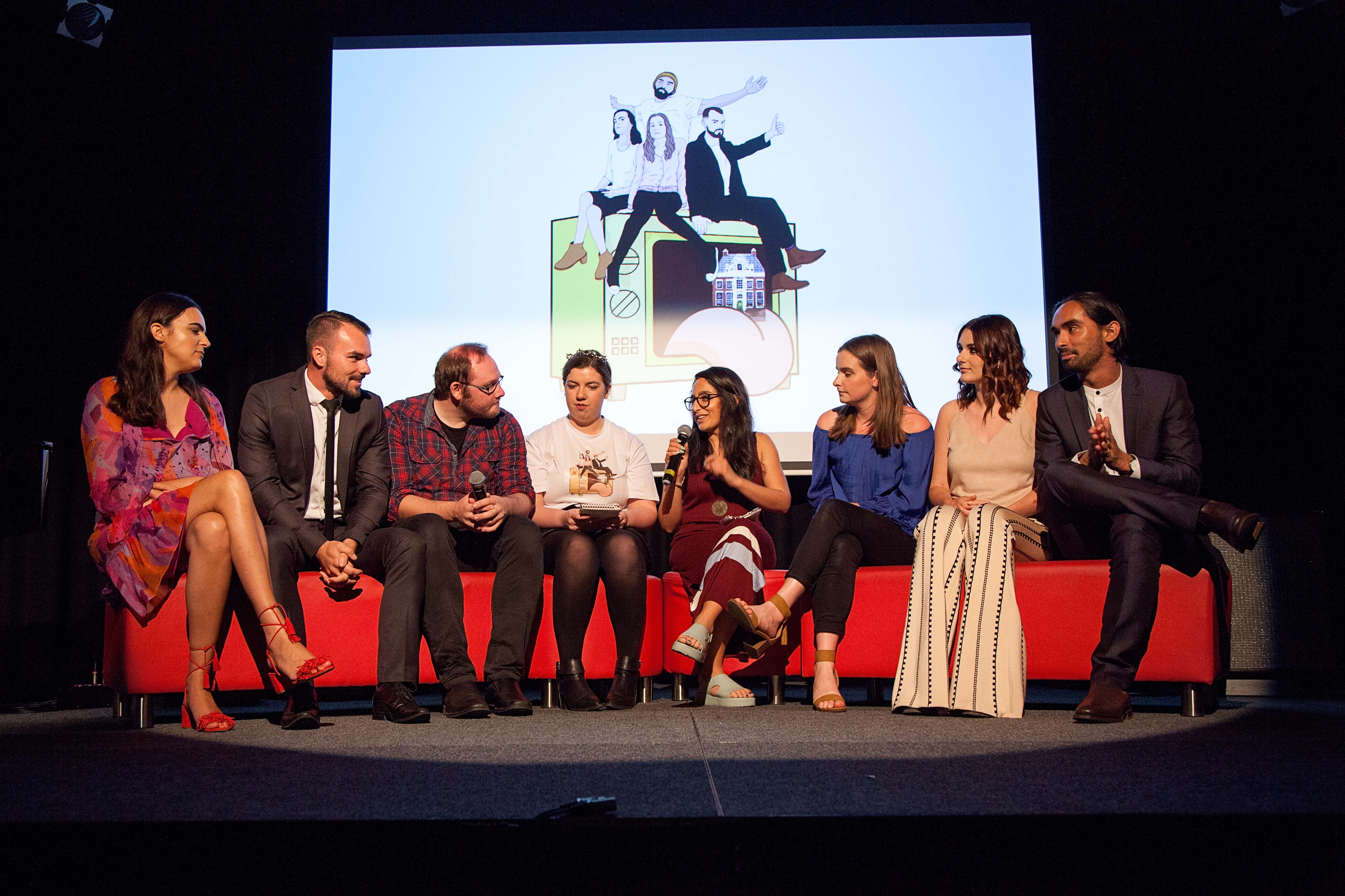

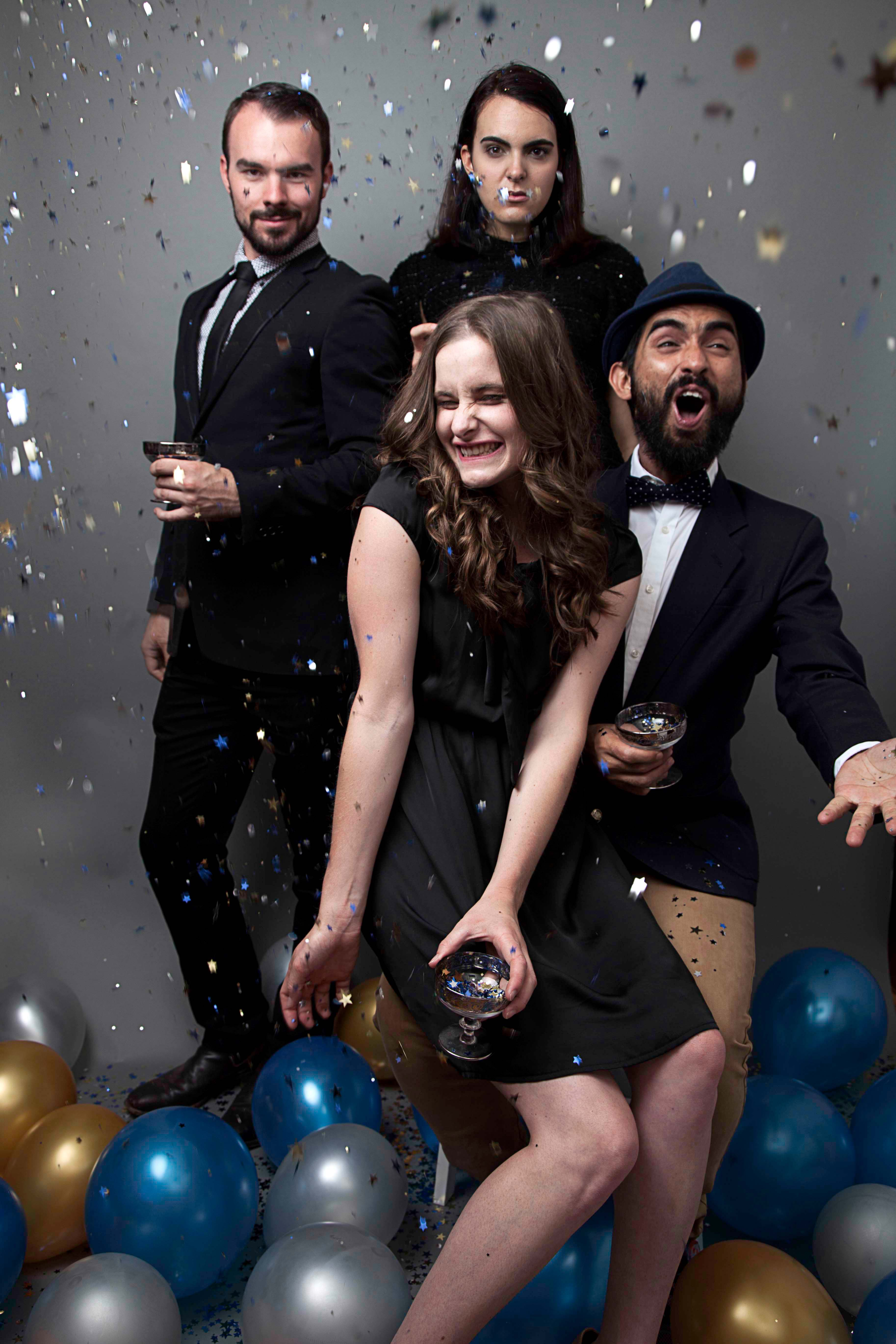
Holiday Season Photoshoot: Georgia Woodward, David Halgren, Grace Avery, Sonny - Joe Flanagan.

A Shared House received international critical acclaim. It was titled "The Best Web Series of 2015" by critics and was given a 9/10 rating by The Au/Review. Both Woodward and Lundberg were praised in the industry for what they were able to accomplish within the strict budget limitations.

A Shared House saw a healthy viewership on YouTube. Season One struggled on its first weekend online as it went live on the same day as the November 2015 Paris Attacks.

Despite this, the show had strong growth and the producers released an additional version with Chinese-Mandarin subtitles in January 2016.

=== Awards and nominations ===
Best Web Series - Toronto Independent Film Awards, Best Web/TV Series - Chicago Amarcord TV Fest, Best International Web Series - NYC Web Fest, Best Ensemble Cast - NYC Web Fest Best Dramedy - NYC Web Fest, Best International Web Series - NYC Web Fest, Best International Dramedy Series- Miami Web Fest, Best International Comedy Series - Miami Web Fest, Joshua Lundberg, Outstanding Writer, Comedy - Los Angeles Web Series Festival Georgia Woodward, Outstanding Actress, Comedy - Los Angeles Web Series Festival David Halgren, Outstanding Actor, Comedy - Los Angeles Web Series Festival Nick Dale, Outstanding Supporting Actor, Comedy - Los Angeles Web Series Festival

A Shared House started its festival run with an Official Selection at the Los Angeles Web Festival at Warner Brothers Studios in California. It was Nominated for four awards including Outstanding Lead Actor for David Halgren, Outstanding Lead Actress for Georgia Woodward and Outstanding Guest Actor for Nick Dale. The show was nominated for Outstanding Writing in a Comedy Series.

A Shared House won the Outstanding Writing in a Comedy Series at the festival as well as Outstanding Guest Actor for Nick Dale.
