= Alexia Robinson (actress) =

American actress

- Born: January 1, 1960 (age 66); Fort Lauderdale, Florida, U.S
- Occupation: Actress
- Years active: 1985–present

Alexia Robinson (born January 1, 1960) is an American actress, known for her roles on television.

== Life and career ==
Robinson was born and raised in Fort Lauderdale, Florida and attended Florida State University. She began her career performing on stage productions For Colored Girls Who Have Considered Suicide / When the Rainbow Is Enuf and A Raisin in the Sun. On television, Robinson made her debut playing the recurring role on the daytime soap opera Rituals in 1985 and later made guest-starring appearances on prime time series such as Fame, Hill Street Blues and Murder, She Wrote. From 1990 to 1994 she played Nurse Meg Lawson in the ABC daytime soap opera, General Hospital.

In 1990, Robinson made her big screen debut in the science fiction action film Total Recall directed by Paul Verhoeven. Her other film credits include The Nutty Professor (1996), Candyman: Day of the Dead (1999) and MacArthur Park (2001). She had the recurring role in the ABC crime drama series Murder One in 1996, and was regular cast member in the WB prime time soap opera, Savannah from 1996 to 1997. From 1997 to 1998 she starred in the UPN sitcom, Good News. She also guest-starred on Walker, Texas Ranger, Getting Personal, Veronica's Closet, V.I.P., and had the recurring roles on Malcolm & Eddie and Eve.

In 2000, Robinson joined the cast of CBS soap opera, The Young and the Restless playing Alex Perez. She first appeared on November 29, 2000, to fill the void left by Victoria Rowell. In 2002, it was announced that Robinson was to exit the soap after the expiration of her contract, and departed onscreen on May 9, 2002. She received the NAACP Image Award for Outstanding Actress in a Daytime Drama Series nomination in 2002. Since leaving the soap, Robinson acted several television shows, she owns and operates the Alexia Robinson Acting Studio in North Hollywood, Los Angeles. In 2009, Robinson directed the Burbank, California's production of For Colored Girls Who Have Considered Suicide / When the Rainbow Is Enuf, receiving positive review from Los Angeles Times. In 2022 she had a recurring role in the Peacock series, The Bay.

== Filmography ==
=== Film ===
Year	Title	Role	Notes
1990	Total Recall	Tiffany	
1996	The Nutty Professor	Sexy Girl	
1999	Candyman 3: Day of the Dead	Tamara	Video
2001	MacArthur Park	Kim	
2011	SmartActors	Acting Coach	Short

=== Television ===
Year	Title	Role	Notes
1985	Rituals	Claudia	Regular Cast
1985	Fame	Back Up Girl	Episode: "Team Work"
1986	What's Happening Now!!	Susan	Episode: "Thy Boss's Daughter"
1987	Hill Street Blues	Tess Williams	Episode: "The Cookie Crumbles"
1990-94	General Hospital	Meg Lawson	Regular Cast
1992	Freshman Dorm	Eve	Episode: "Sex, Truth and Theatre"
1993	Murder, She Wrote	Holly Chase	Episode: "The Sound of Murder"
1994	Walker, Texas Ranger	Alisha Holmes	Episode: "The Reunion"
1995	Strange Luck	Femme Fatale	Episode: "Over Exposure"
1996	Murder One	Akeesha Wesley	Recurring Cast: Season 1
1996-97	Savannah	Cassie Wheeler	Recurring Cast: Season 2
1997-98	Good News	Mona Phillips	Main Cast
1998	Getting Personal	Alex	Episode: "Chasing Sammy"
1998	Vengeance Unlimited	Marian	Episode: "Dishonorable Discharge"
1998-00	Malcolm & Eddie	Ashley Hawkins	Recurring Cast: Season 3, Guest: Season 4
1999	Martial Law	Nicole Bannion	Episode: "Call of the Wild"
1999	Veronica's Closet	Lana	Episode: "Veronica's New Year"
2000	V.I.P.	Clara Moss	Episode: "V.I.P., R.I.P."
2001-02	The Young and the Restless	Alex Perez	Regular Cast
2002	Haunted	FBI Agent Monique Howard	Episode: "Simon Redux"
2004	CSI: Miami	Mrs. Kincaid's Sister	Episode: "Witness to Murder"
2005	Eve	Tamara	Recurring Cast: Season 2, Guest: Season 3
2023-24	The Bay	Detective Natasha Abraham	Recurring Cast: Season 7
