= Georgia Woodward =

Australian producer and actress (born 1992)

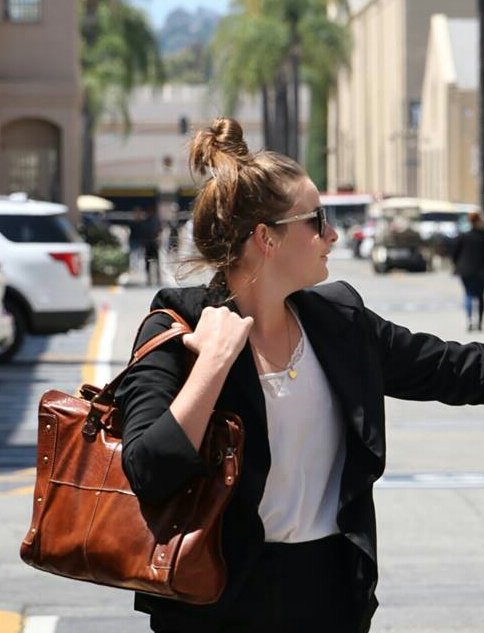
- Born: Georgia Woodward; 21 May 1992 (age 34); Sydney, Australia
- Occupations: Producer; Actress
- Years active: 2016–present
- Spouse: L Halgren (m. 2016; div. 2021)

Georgia Woodward (born 21 May 1992) is an Australian producer and actress. Woodward is most known for her starring role as Charlotte on the hit online series, A Shared House.

== Early life ==
Georgia Woodward was born in Sydney, Australia to music teachers Tanya and Colin Woodward. She has a sister, Amy Woodward. She grew up in Manly on Sydney's Northern Beaches. She graduated from Cromer Campus in 2009. During school Woodward attended acting classes at the National Institute of Dramatic Art (NIDA). After graduating high school, Woodward began studying an Acting Degree at Sydney Theatre School. Whilst at the school, Woodward began collaborating with Joshua Lundberg on the online sitcom A Shared House. Woodward decided to drop out of her degree to focus on the series.

Woodward is a trained short and long form improviser. She trained at Laugh Masters Academy, a Chicago style improvisational comedy school in Sydney.

== Career ==
In 2021, Woodward was appointed as a Development Producer at Southern Pictures, a factual production company based in Sydney, Australia. This appointment was supported through Screen Australia Enterprise People Program.

=== Barking Mouse (formerly Hustle Productions) ===
Woodward and director, Joshua Lundberg launched their production company, Hustle Productions in July 2016 after the success of A Shared House.

In 2018, Hustle Productions relaunched as Barking Mouse. Woodward continues to work as a producer.

=== A Shared House ===
In 2014, Woodward starred in Joshua Lundberg's short film Unmanned. The two worked well together and in January 2015 Woodward approached Lundberg about her interest in creating a comedy series. "I was inspired by Amy Poehler and Tina Fey who created their own opportunities in the entertainment industry". The series was produced on a small budget and was made up of a cast and crew who worked on it because they "loved the writing".

A Shared House was released on YouTube on Friday 13 November 2015.

The series received international critical acclaim, although Woodward was criticised for her poor performances. It was titled 'The Best Web Series of 2015' by online critic Web Series 2 Watch (What U Want 2 Watch) and given a 9/10 Rating by The AU Review.

Lundberg and Woodward announced pre-production for Season 2 in February 2016 .

A Shared House earned Woodward an Outstanding Actress in Comedy Series Award Nomination at the 2016 Los Angeles Web Series Festival at Warner Brothers Studios in California. The series was nominated for another three awards at the festival and took home the Outstanding Writing in a Comedy Series award.

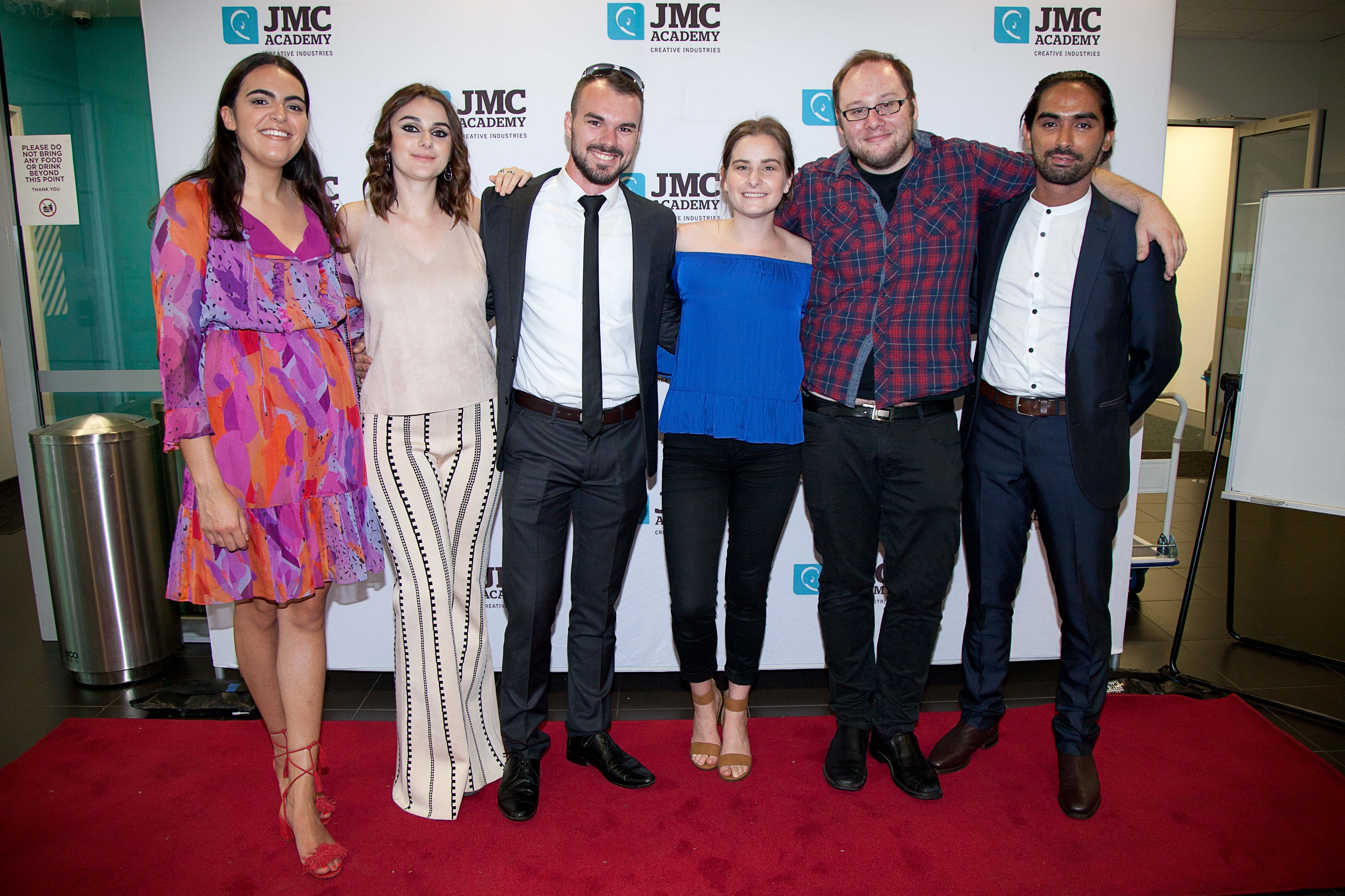
A Shared House Cast at Season 2 Sydney Premiere

== Awards and nominations ==
- A Shared House (Series)
- Los Angeles Web Series Festival
- Nominee: Outstanding Actress in a Comedy Series
- Winner: Outstanding Actress in a Comedy Series
- NYC Web Festival
- Nominee: Best International Series - A Shared House
- Nominee: Best Ensemble Cast - A Shared House
- Nominee: Best Dramedy - A Shared House
- Staying the Night (Short film)
- Mardi Gras Film Festival
- Winner: Audience Award for Best Short Film
