= Michael Ajakwe Jr. =

American television producer and writer (1965–2018)

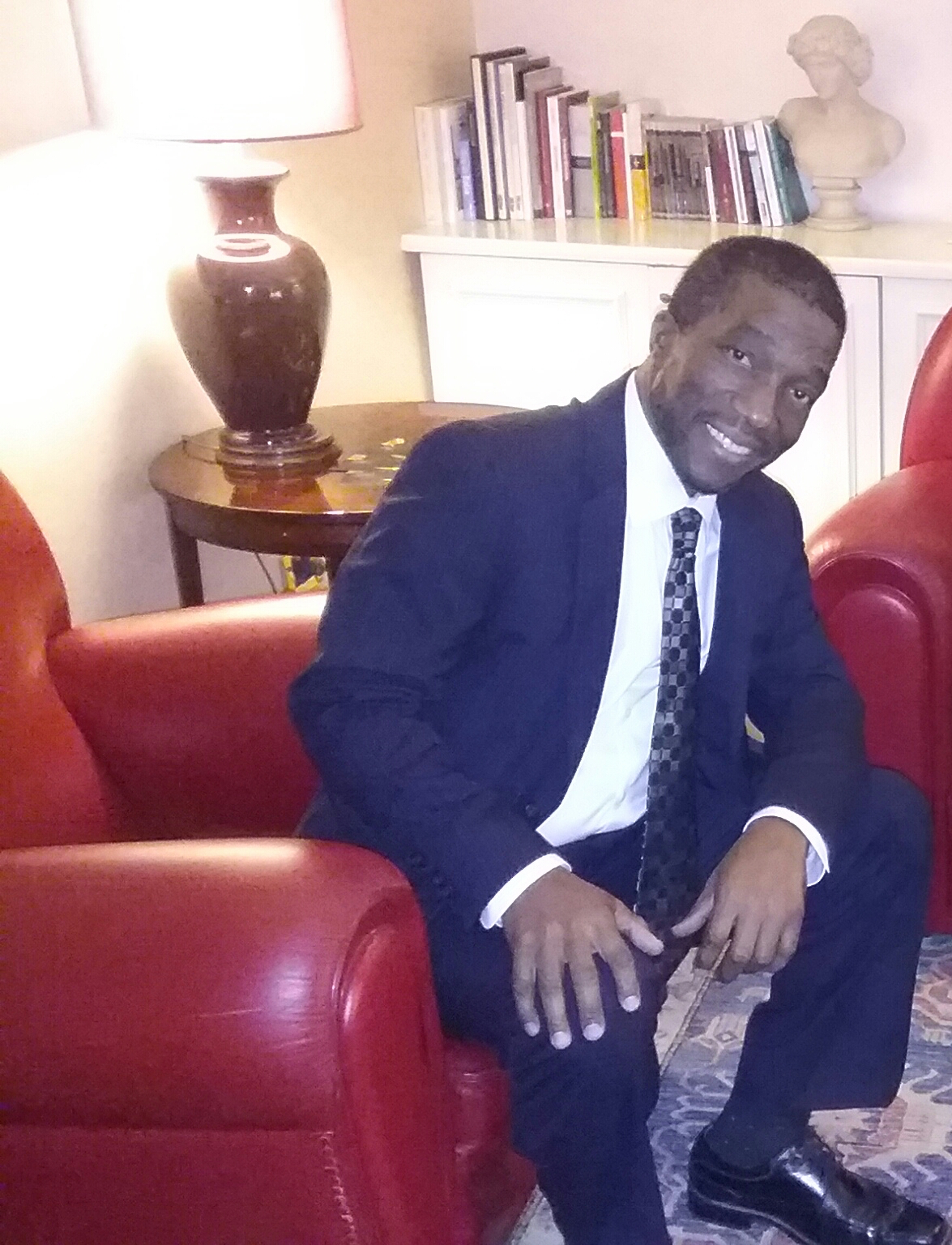
- Born: Michael Okwudili Ajakwe Jr. October 12, 1965; Los Angeles, California, US
- Died: May 31, 2018 (aged 52); Los Angeles, California, US
- Occupations: Television, theatrical, and film writer and producer
- Spouse: Tammy Ajakwe
- Parent(s): Patricia Ifediorah and Michael Nnaemeke Ajakwe

Michael Okwudili Ajakwe Jr. (October 12, 1965 – May 31, 2018) was an American television, theatrical, and film writer and producer. The creator of the world's first web series festival and the founder of LAWEBFEST (Los Angeles Web Festival). Prior to the year of his death, Beauty and the Baller, a nine-episode comedy series that he created, produced, and directed outside of the studio system, was licensed to Viacom, which premiered on Centric TV in 2017.

== Early life ==
Michael Okwudili Ajakwe Jr. was born on October 12, 1965, the oldest son of Chief Michael Ajakwe Sr. and Lady Patricia Ajakwe who emigrated from Nigeria to America in the early 1960s. Ajakwe was born and raised in Los Angeles, California, growing up in Inglewood, California. Ajakwe excelled in school and received multiple awards from the Imperial Crenshaw Kiwanis Club. During his early days at Morningside High School in the 1980s, his father took a new job assignment that allowed him to take his family back to his homeland of Nigeria. Ajakwe adapted to his family traditions and culture heritage. He received his first high school diploma at age 16 years old. But in 1982, Ajakwe's parents allowed him to return to Inglewood to live with a close family friend where he completed his second high school diploma, graduating with the Morningside Monarch's class of 1983. He went on to attend the University of Redlands on an academic scholarship and earned bachelor's degree in both English and Political Science in 1987.

== Career ==
Ajakwe's professional career spanned theater, television, and film. As a television producer, he had the opportunity to work with artists such as Quincy Jones, Clive Davis, Sly Stone, Steve Harvey, Stevie Wonder, David Foster, Verdine White, Ray Parker Jr. and Deniece Williams. In 1995, he along with the entire producing team of E's Talk Soup won the Emmy Award for Outstanding Special Class Program. Later that year, after participating in the exclusive Warner Bros Writers' Workshop, Ajakwe was hired as a staff writer for the hit television sitcom, Martin. He went on to write and/or produce television shows such as Soul Food, Moesha, The Brothers Garcia, Sister, Sister, Eve, Love That Girl, and Unsung. He also sold original television pilots to Paramount Pictures, Warner Bros., and LATV/American Latino Syndication. Brett Ratner hired Ajakwe to write his first studio film, a biopic, called Crip. Ajakwe also developed television and film projects for Dr. Dre, Kim Fields, Judy Pace-flood, Vidal Sassoon, Kenny Smith, Natalie Cole, and others.

Ajakwe was a member of the inaugural class of the Bill Cosby–sponsored Guy Hank/Marvin Miller Screenwriting Fellowship Program at the University of Southern California School of Cinematic Arts. He later returned to the program as a professor.

Ajakwe also co-produced international shows such as Journal Feliz (The Good News), Mano a Mano (Brother to Brother), which ran on Brazilian television. He also wrote, directed, and produced a number of theatrical productions including: If You Don't Believe: A love story, Body Language and Happy Anniversary Punk, which tackled the topic of black on black crime. Over the years, his body of work has been nominated for 29 NAACP theatre awards and won five. In 2008, he received the city of Inglewood's Beacon of Light award.

In 2010, Ajakwe created and launched the world's first all-web series festival – The Los Angeles Web Series Festival. LAWEBFEST has showcased over 1500 web series from 43 different states and 39 different countries. As founder, he personally viewed over 20,000 web series from around the globe. He helped launch a number of international web fests in Europe, Asia, Australia, and South America. In 2011, Ajakwe helped launch the Marseille Web Fest in the south of France – Europe's first web series festival. He was awarded the key to the city by Mayor Jean-Claude Gaudin and served as the festival's Honorary president from 2012 to 2015.

== Personal life and death ==
In late 2015, Ajakwe was diagnosed with pancreatic cancer. He created and licensed his television project, Beauty and The Baller – which was adapted from his web series Who, to Viacom and it premiered on centric TV in 2017.

On May 31, 2018, he died, surrounded by his wife, family and close friends.

== Published works ==
- South Central Stories: Double Or Nothin the Ride, Happy Anniversary Punk
- Company Policy: The Rage Behind the Mask

== Honours, decorations, and awards ==
- Daytime Emmy for Talk Soup on E! Entertainment in 1995
- Nominated for 29 NAACP Image Awards
