= MacArthur Park (film) =

Drama film by Billy Wirth

- Directed by: Billy Wirth
- Written by: Billy Wirth; Tyrone Atkins; Aaron Courseault; Sheri Sussman
- Produced by: Billy Wirth; Maricel Pagulayan
- Starring: Thomas Jefferson Byrd; Ellen Cleghorne; B-Real; Balthazar Getty; Lori Petty; Bad Azz
- Cinematography: Kristian Bernier
- Edited by: Terri Breed
- Music by: Stephen Perkins
- Production company: Northshire Entertainment Group
- Distributed by: IFC Films
- Release date: January 11, 2001
- Running time: 109 minutes
- Country: United States
- Language: English

MacArthur Park is a 2001 American independent drama film directed by Billy Wirth and written by Wirth, Tyrone Atkins, Aaron Courseault and Sheri Sussman. The film features ensemble cast stars Thomas Jefferson Byrd, Ellen Cleghorne, B-Real, Balthazar Getty, Lori Petty and Bad Azz. The film follows a homeless former jazz musician (Thomas Jefferson Byrd) trying to survive in MacArthur Park. R&B singer Macy Gray covered the song “MacArthur Park” for the closing credits.

MacArthur Park premiered at the Sundance Film Festival on January 19, 2001, where it was nominated for the Grand Jury Prize. It later screened at the 2001 Taos Talking Pictures Film Festival. The film received positive reviews from critics for subject matter and performances (particularly Byrd, Getty, Deary, Cleghorne and Lori Petty).

== Cast ==
- Thomas Jefferson Byrd as Cody
- Brandon Quintin Adams as Terry
- Bad Azz as Pair
- Tami Roman as Rose
- Miguel A. Núñez Jr. as Blackie
- Ellen Cleghorne as Blue
- B-Real as Freddie
- Lori Petty as Kelly
- Glenn Plummer as Leo
- Sydney Tamiia Poitier as Linda
- Sticky Fingaz as E-Max
- Balthazar Getty as Steve
- Kirk Taylor as Officer Davis
- Alexia Robinson as Kim
- Keno K. Deary as P.T.
- Julie Delpy as Wendy
- Carlton Wilborn as St. Louis
- Cynda Williams as Alicia
- David Faustino as Bobby
- Rachel Hunter as Karen
- Sydney Walsh as Newscaster
- Saaphyri Windsor as Jackie

== Reception ==
On the review aggregator website Rotten Tomatoes, 80% of 5 critics' reviews are positive, with an average rating of 6.3/10.

Film critic Dennis Harvey from Variety gave it positive review praising Wirth's feature directing debut and acting performances. Film critic Dennis Schwartz also gave it positive review writing: "The film is one-part gritty urban social realism and another part art-house chic, which leaves a limited audience for a film that is dramatically flawed but bursts through at times with raw power."
