= Death Wish 3 =

1985 American action thriller film by Michael Winner

- Theatrical release poster
- Directed by: Michael Winner
- Screenplay by: Don Jakoby (as Michael Edmonds)
- Based on: Characters by Brian Garfield
- Produced by: Menahem Golan; Yoram Globus
- Starring: Charles Bronson; Deborah Raffin; Ed Lauter; Martin Balsam
- Cinematography: John Stanier
- Edited by: Michael Winner (as Arnold Crust)
- Music by: Jimmy Page (Reused from Death Wish II)
- Production companies: The Cannon Group, Inc. Golan-Globus Productions
- Distributed by: Cannon Film Distributors
- Release date: November 1, 1985
- Running time: 90 minutes
- Country: United States
- Language: English
- Budget: $9–10 million
- Box office: $16.1 million

Death Wish 3 is a 1985 American vigilante action-thriller film directed and edited by Michael Winner. A sequel to the 1982 film Death Wish II, it is the third installment and the last to be directed by Winner in the Death Wish film series. It stars Charles Bronson as the vigilante killer Paul Kersey and sees him battling with New York street punk gangs while receiving tactical support from a local NYPD Inspector Richard Shriker (Ed Lauter). Despite being set in New York City, some of the filming was shot in London to reduce production costs. It was succeeded by Death Wish 4: The Crackdown.

== Plot ==
Paul Kersey has spent the years since the events of the previous film traveling the country as a vigilante. He returns to New York City for the first time since his expulsion over ten years previous, to visit his Korean War buddy Charley. He arrives to find a gang attacked Charley in his East New York apartment and collapses dead in Paul's arms. The police mistake Paul for the murderer and arrest him.

At the police station, NYPD Inspector Richard Shriker recognizes Paul as "Mr. Vigilante". Shriker berates Paul and puts him in the same holding cell as Manny Fraker, leader of the gang who killed Charley. Paul fights Manny, who is released. Shriker confesses the police see the crime rate increasing daily. Shriker tells Paul he will let Paul kill all the punks he wants, as long as Paul keeps Shriker informed of gang activity, so the police can get positive publicity by making arrests.

Paul moves into Charley's apartment. The building is in a gang-turf war zone, populated by elderly tenants terrified of Manny's gang. They include Bennett Cross, a World War II veteran and Charley's buddy; Eli and Erica Kaprov, an elderly Jewish couple; and a young Hispanic couple, Rodriguez and his wife Maria. After a few violent muggings, Paul buys a used car as bait and shoots two car thieves with his Colt Cobra. Paul protects Maria from two gang attacks. However, she is assaulted and raped during a third; she dies from her injuries.

Paul spends an afternoon with Bennett handloading ammunition for a new Wildey hunting pistol and tests the gun when the Giggler steals his Nikon camera. Paul is applauded by the neighborhood, Shriker and the police take the credit, and Paul throws a gang member off a roof.

Paul takes Public defender Kathryn Davis to dinner. While waiting in his car, Kathryn is knocked unconscious by Manny; the car is pushed downhill where it collides with traffic and explodes. Shriker places Paul under protective custody, fearing he is at grave risk. Bennett's taxi shop is blown up, and his machine gun jams when he seeks revenge on the gangster, who cripple him.

Shriker takes Paul to the hospital and he escapes after Bennett tells him where to find a second machine gun. Paul and Rodriguez, freshly armed, mow down many criminals before running out of ammunition. Other neighbors begin fighting back as Manny sends in reinforcements. Shriker intervenes, and he and Paul take down many of the gang together. Paul returns to the apartment to retrieve ammunition, is confronted by Manny, and Shriker and Manny shoot each other.

Paul calls for an ambulance for the wounded Shriker but, Manny, wearing a bulletproof vest, recovers and turns his gun on them. Shriker distracts Manny and Paul kills him with a mail-ordered M72 LAW rocket launcher. The surviving gangsters, seeing Manny's smoldering remains and surrounded by an angry crowd, flee. The residents cheer and as police sirens approach, Shriker gives Paul a head start. Grateful, Paul takes off.

== Cast ==
- Charles Bronson as Paul Kersey
- Deborah Raffin as Kathryn Davis
- Ed Lauter as NYPD Inspector Richard Shriker
- Martin Balsam as Bennett Cross
- Francis Drake as Charley
- Joe Gonzalez as Mr. Rodriguez
- Marina Sirtis as Maria Rodriguez
- Leo Kharibian as Eli Kaprov
- Hana Maria Pravda as Erica Kaprov
- John Gabriel as Emil
- Mildred Shay as Magda
- Gavan O'Herlihy as Manny Fraker
- Tony Spiridakis as Angel
- Alex Winter as Hermosa
- Nelson Fernandez as Chaco
- David Crean as Hector
- Tony Britts as Tulio
- Ricco Ross as "The Cuban"
- Kirk Taylor as "The Giggler"
- Barbie Wilde as Manny Fraker's Girlfriend
- Sandra Dee Richardson as Cuban Street Punk
- Margaret Mary Briggs as Hell's Angel Girl
- Manning Redwood as Captain Sterns
- Ron Hayes as Lieutenant
- Topo Grajeda as Garcia

== Production ==
=== Development ===
Death Wish 3 was greenlit in June 1981 after the previous film Death Wish II earned back its budget before completing production when it signed a cable television distribution deal with HBO. Following the success of Death Wish II, Cannon Films proceeded in signing film contracts with prestigious actors and directors. Financially, their most reliable products were formulaic action films starring Charles Bronson, Chuck Norris, and other stars of the genre. The new sequel to Death Wish was announced at the 1984 Cannes Film Festival, with filming originally to begin in the autumn of 1984. Charles Bronson haggled with Cannon over his fee so they offered the role of Paul Kersey to Norris, who turned it down, claiming that the violence in the movie was "too negative".

The concept of Paul Kersey facing a street gang which terrorizes elderly citizens was developed by screenwriter Don Jakoby. Jakoby specialized in science fiction films, having developed scripts for other upcoming films such as Lifeforce (1985) and Invaders from Mars (1986). His screenplay reportedly turned Paul into an urban version of John Rambo, displeasing Bronson in the process. The producers then tasked Gail Morgan Hickman to write other potential versions of the script. Hickman came up with three different script samples and submitted them for approval. He learned weeks later that they were all rejected in favor of keeping Jakoby's version.

The film had multiple deleted scenes that were planned to appear, but only some of them appeared in the TV cuts of the film. The only known ones were a meeting between Ed Lauter's character, Richard Shriker, discussing the crime statistics with the District Attorney, the police confiscating a Doberman Pinscher that one of the residents had for protection against the gang and Paul Kersey using an old mattress as a punching bag as part of his workout routine. A scene that was never filmed included a male-on-male prison rape in its early scenes. It was removed by being too dark. A similar scene was later included in another Bronson film, Kinjite: Forbidden Subjects (1989). Jakoby objected to extensive rewrites of his script and asked for his name to be removed from the credits. The film used the pseudonym "Michael Edmonds" to credit its screenwriter.

The film incorporated two elements of the Death Wish novel by Brian Garfield. The first was the concept of a giggling Puerto Rican thug. The second was the use of a car as bait for thieves. A scheduled novelization of the film was cancelled, since Garfield retained the exclusive right to write sequel novels. According to the book Bronson's Loose! The Making of the Death Wish Films by Paul Talbot, the original working title Death Wish III was changed to Death Wish 3 because the Cannon Group conducted a survey and found that nearly half of the U.S. population could not read Roman numerals.

=== Casting ===
Bronson was paid $1.5 million out of the $10 million budget. Once again, director Michael Winner was recruited for the project. His latest films, The Wicked Lady (1983) and Scream for Help (1984), were box office flops and Winner was in need of a "surefire hit". He decided against retaining the grim tone of the previous two Death Wish films in favor of going gung-ho for the third film. Bronson said the film was "nearly the same as the first two Death Wishes that came before except this time he's not alone... It is a very violent picture but it all falls within the category of the story." Bronson did add however that "there are men on motorbikes, an element that's threatening – throwing bottles and that sort of thing – and I machine gun them. That to me is excessive violence and is unnecessary."

The film includes a scene involving punks attempting to rape a topless woman. The role was played by Sandy Grizzle, Winner's lover at the time, who alleged in the tabloids Daily Star and News of the World that Winner whipped her and used her as a sex slave. Although Jimmy Page is credited as composer, he had no involvement with the movie. Winner reused Page's score for Death Wish II in the editing stage, and rearranged the music for the actual soundtrack, which included Mike Moran, credited as "arranger and conductor", on synthesizers.

When it came to the casting of muggers, the production crew hired multiple locals from London. Gavan O'Herlihy got the role as the main villain of the film, Manny Fraker. His character was originally supposed to be a Latino character named Alex Perez, so the character was no longer a Latino after he was hired. At the time, Alex Winter was a broke film student and needed a summer job, so he was given the role of Hermosa. Winter recounted that he and the other actors who play the members of the gang would do the stunts themselves, including the stunt where Hermosa falls off a moving car. After numerous failed takes, Winner asked him jokingly, "I thought you wanted to do your own stunts?".

Kirk Taylor, who played "The Giggler", told a story that Winner didn't like Taylor's tardiness one day. However, Winner quickly dismissed it and called director Stanley Kubrick, who was in London to look for actors for his upcoming film, Full Metal Jacket (1987), and recommended Taylor, who was given a role in the film. Paul Kersey's love interest in the film, Kathryn Davis, was played by Deborah Raffin. She was good friends with Bronson's wife, Jill Ireland, at the time and had frequently spent time horseback riding with her. To prepare for her role as a public defender, she shadowed one from Los Angeles.

=== Filming ===
Filming started on April 19, 1985, in the "crime-infested" East New York section of Brooklyn. Other New York locations used for the film included the Queensboro Bridge, the Port Authority Bus Terminal, and Long Island. In early May, the production team moved to London. Winner found it useful that both cities had many Victorian buildings. The police station scenes were filmed at the old Lambeth Hospital in Lambeth, which has since been demolished.

The neighborhood used for the gang war of the film was Brixton, a district which was infested with real-life gangs. Cinematographer John Stanier was previously director of photography for Oxford Blues (1984) and The Dirty Dozen: Next Mission (1985). He would subsequently film Rambo III (1988). In his introduction to the Audible audiobook of The Saint Intervenes (1934), Brad Mengel states that the plot is entirely based on The Saint in New York (1935), both written by Leslie Charteris.

Even though Death Wish 3 takes place in New York City, some parts of the film were shot in London to make the production less expensive. As a result, some of the extras (both police and gang members) were British. When filming was completed, Winner solicited the help of U.S. Air Force military personnel stationed at High Wycombe Air Station in the UK to provide dubbing with their New York accents for the accents of the British extras. Of the British actors who appeared, Marina Sirtis had previously worked for Michael Winner on The Wicked Lady (1983). She followed her appearance in this film by garnering the role of Deanna Troi on the TV show Star Trek: The Next Generation in 1987.

== Reception ==
=== Box office ===
The film opened on November 1, 1985, on 1,460 screens and was number one at the U.S. box office for the weekend with a gross of $5,319,116. It retained the number one spot the following weekend. The film earned $16.1 million in a seven-week run. Profits from foreign release, video, and television were sufficient to make this a lucrative release for Cannon.

=== Critical response ===
After its release in theaters, Death Wish 3 received primarily negative reviews. Rotten Tomatoes reports an 14% approval rating based on 21 reviews. On Metacritic the film has a weighted average score of 18 out of 100, based on 9 critics, indicating "Overwhelming Dislike". Roger Ebert remarked that the film was a marginal improvement over Death Wish II with better action, directing, and special effects, but was still poor in absolute terms. He commented that Bronson's acting showed his lack of enthusiasm for the film and he awarded it one star.

Variety described Bronson's performance as lifeless, though they said the film's main flaw was its failure to provide a convincing motive for Paul Kersey's latest killing spree. Walter Goodman of The New York Times ridiculed the film's lack of realism, particularly that violent crime is surrealistically rampant, and that the repetition of the basic plot of the original Death Wish (i.e. that Kersey's closest friends and relatives are brutally murdered) grows more absurd with each installment of the series. He summarized that "There is not a moment of credibility in the movie and the ending is sheer chaos, and anticlimactic at that. Mr. Winner runs out of imagination before Mr. Bronson runs out of ammunition." However, he acknowledged that the film effectively created all the elements that make the Death Wish series appealing to its fans.

Some lambasted the film for sadistic over-violent content and the fact that a 64-year-old Charles Bronson was thrown into a Rambo-like situation. Leonard Maltin rated the movie one-and-a-half stars out of four—the only Death Wish sequel he rated higher than BOMB—and said: "Same old stuff; Bronson's 'ordinary guy' character is no longer convincing, since his entire immediate family was wiped out by the end of Part 2."

In later years, the film gathered a cult following. M. Enois Duarte of High Def Digest said the "unintentional humor" and "absurdity" made it "so bad, it's hilariously good".

== Controversies ==
Several stuntmen allege that Winner was an abusive and dangerous director with his crew on film sets.

Rocky Taylor alleges that Winner created a dangerous and deceptive work environment for the production of Death Wish 3 that led to Taylor being severely injured during a stunt. The moment called for Taylor to jump off a building and across a controlled blaze and into an arranged set of boxes. However, Taylor says Winner turned up height of the flames while cameras rolled without consulting him. Taylor completed the stunt but missed the boxes by "about a foot", breaking his pelvis, back and receiving some burns. Taylor says Winner visited him in the hospital with several newspaper photographers in tow, laid next to Taylor and whispered in his ear, "don't think you can sue me, Rocky, because you can't get away with it." Taylor says the injury affected his career and "ruined my life." He recreated and performed the stunt successfully 26 years later in 2011.

Actress Marina Sirtis, who was directed by Winner in The Wicked Lady and Death Wish 3, has implied she was mistreated by Winner, as reported by The Stage in 2019:

When it comes to the dark side of film, TV and theatre's treatment of women, Sirtis is "in awe of those young actresses" who have spoken out as part of the #MeToo and #TimesUp movements. She reveals she has been assaulted during her career. "I went to see an agent here and he lifted up my dress", she says. "And I know you're not supposed to speak ill of the dead", she adds, but she hopes that film director Michael Winner, who directed her in Death Wish 3, will "rot in hell for all eternity".

== Sequel ==
A sequel titled Death Wish 4: The Crackdown, was released in 1987.

== Video game ==
The film was made into a video game of the same name by Gremlin Graphics for the ZX Spectrum, Commodore 64, MSX and Amstrad CPC. In the game, the player controls Paul Kersey in the streets and buildings in a free-roaming, all-out gunfight with gangsters. It was one of the goriest games of its time, featuring multiple weapons with detailed, different damage patterns and the possibility to kill civilians.
