= List of Eve (American TV series) episodes =

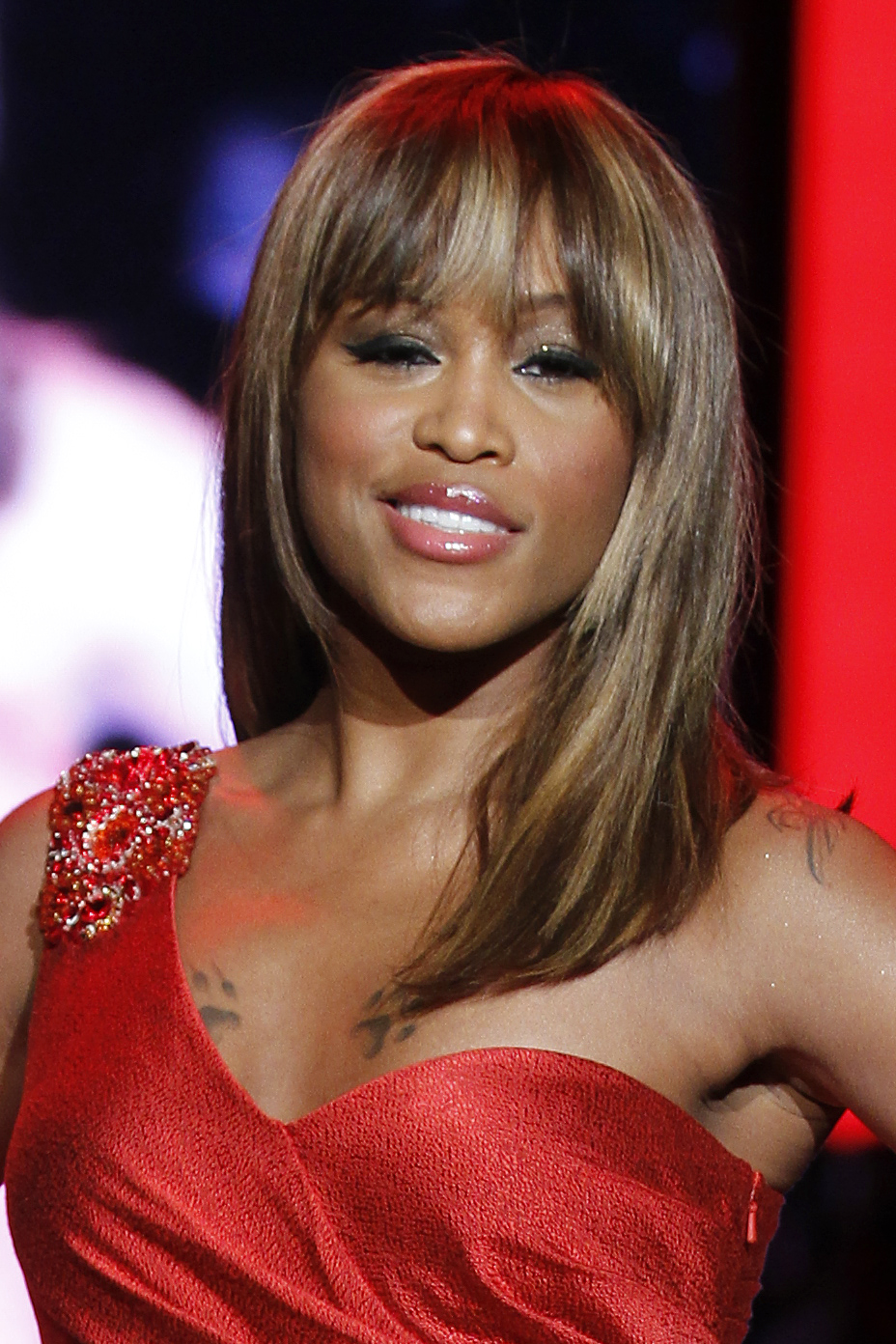
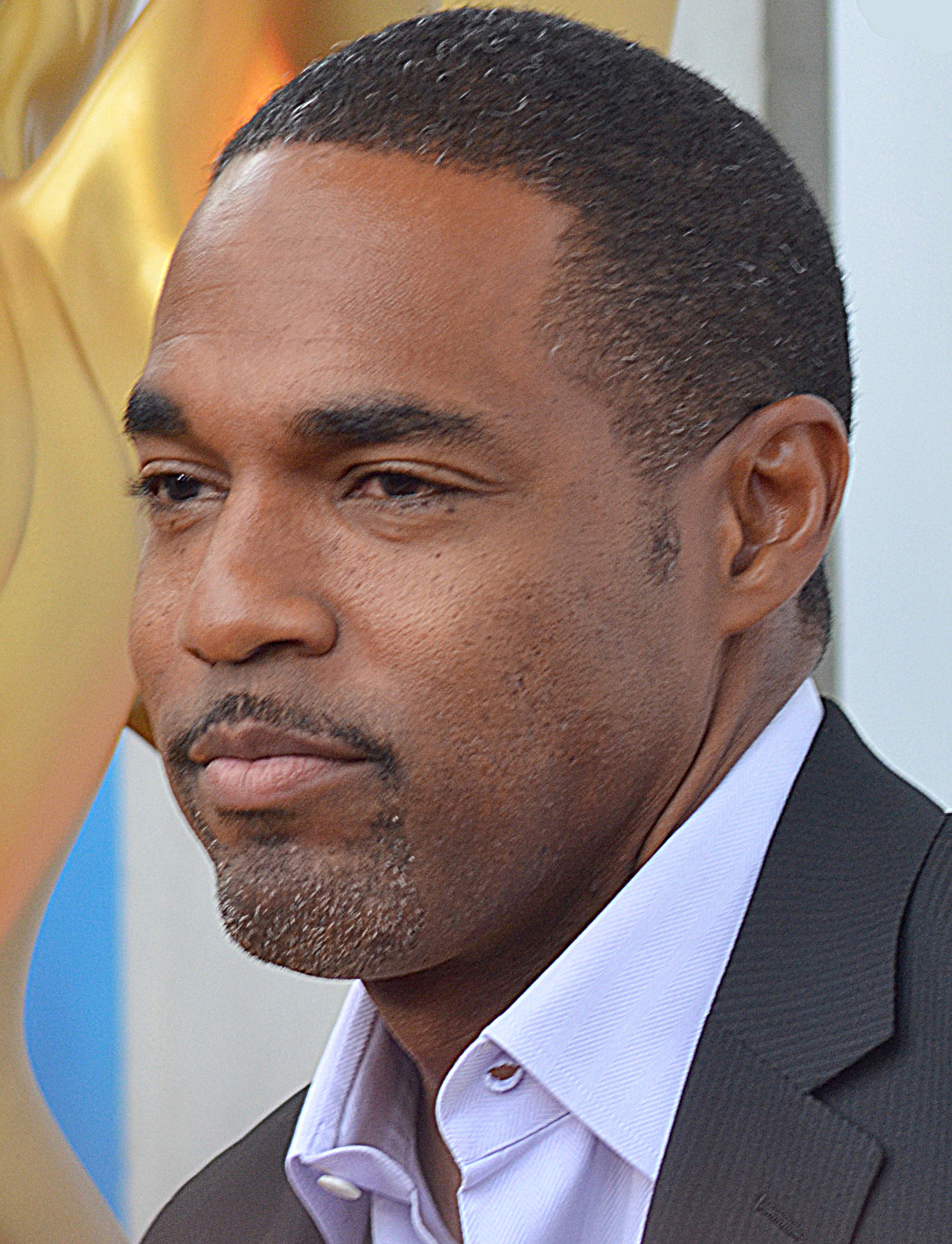
Eve primarily focuses on the romance between the two characters played by Eve (left) and Jason Winston George (right).

Eve is an American television sitcom that was broadcast on United Paramount Network (UPN) from September 15, 2003, to May 11, 2006. A total of 66 episodes of Eve were broadcast over three seasons. Created by Meg DeLoatch, the series follows Miami fashion designer Shelly Williams (Eve) through her relationship with physical therapist Jeremiah Thurgood "J.T." Hunter (Jason George).

DeLoatch described the sitcom as "focus[ing] on one relationship and follow[ing] all of the ups and downs in it" and its purpose as "showing the male and female points of view". Shelly and J.T. often turn to their two close friends for advice about the opposite gender, love, and relationships. Shelly frequently looks for advice from former model Rita Lefleur (Ali Landry) and married friend Janie Egins (Natalie Desselle-Reid), while J.T. finds support in his best friend Donovan Brink (Sean Maguire) and IRS worker Nick Dalaney (Brian Hooks). Even though Shelly and J.T.'s relationship is the recurrent storyline, the series does explore the relationships of its supporting cast; Donovan and Rita date each other, and the extremely picky Nick attempts to find the perfect partner.

Critical response to Eve was mixed; some critics praised its inclusion as part of UPN's line-up of black sitcoms, while others felt Eve lacked charisma and the series was inferior to other sitcoms. Despite mixed reviews, Eve received various nominations for her performance, and the series was nominated for the Teen Choice Award for Choice Breakout TV Show during the 2004 Teen Choice Awards. Despite its high ratings among young African-American women, the show was canceled as a result of UPN's merger with the WB Television Network (The WB) to form The CW in 2006. Its removal, along with a majority of UPN's other programs, garnered negative attention from media commentators, who argued that it was an example of whitewashing. Eve has not been made available on Blu-ray or DVD, but it was released on the iTunes Store, Amazon Video, and HBO Max.

== Series overview ==
Season	Episodes	Originally released		Average U.S. viewers (in millions)
Season	Episodes	First released	Last released	Average U.S. viewers (in millions)
1	22	September 15, 2003	May 24, 2004	3.65
2	22	September 21, 2004	May 24, 2005	2.8
3	22	September 22, 2005	May 11, 2006	2.3

== Episodes ==
=== Season 1 (2003–04) ===
The first season introduces the six main characters: Shelly, J.T., Rita, Janie, Nick, and Donovan. Shelly runs the fashion boutique DivaStyle with her friends Janie and Rita. She pursues a relationship with J.T. only to discover he is afraid of commitment and exhibits some chauvinistic behavior. Their relationship is frequently tested by misunderstandings. Nick wants to find his ideal partner, but his attempts are typically thwarted as he is extremely picky about women. Even though his relationship with a woman named Dani appears to be successful, they break up in the spring. Donovan finds himself romantically attracted to Rita, but he resists the temptation because of his fear that it would ruin their friendship.

No. overall	No. in season	Title	Directed by	Written by	Original release date	U.S. viewers (millions)
1	1	"Worst First Date Ever"	Ken Whittingham	Meg DeLoatch	September 15, 2003	4.02
Shelly Williams meets J.T. Hunter, and the two start to date. She has doubts if J.T. is her type of man after he cries at the end of Casablanca. However, her friends suggest they are the perfect couple, and she decides to give him another chance. J.T. also consults with his friends on how to best approach Shelly.
2	2	"Condom Mania"	Ken Whittingham	Meg DeLoatch	September 22, 2003	4.90
Shelly develops strong feelings for J.T. and questions if she should have sex with him. Janie encounters J.T. in a supermarket and notices he is buying a large box of condoms. She encourages Shelly not to move too quickly in her relationship. Janie, Rita, and Shelly disagree on whether J.T. is a playboy, while Nick tells him that he is moving too slowly with the relationship.
3	3	"She Snoops to Conquer"	Leonard R. Garner Jr.	David W. Duclon	September 29, 2003	4.19
Rita and Janie persuade Shelly to look through J.T.'s belongings to get a better understanding of him. After catching her going through his wallet, J.T. conducts his own background check on Shelly. Nick becomes convinced that women are attracted to men with tattoos, and persuades Donovan to introduce him to the best tattoo artist in Miami (DMX).
4	4	"The Talk"	Brian K. Roberts	Janis Hirsch	October 6, 2003	4.45
Shelly begins to question her relationship with J.T. after seeing him with another woman at Rita's party. She flirts with an ex-boyfriend to make J.T. jealous, causing the two to discuss dating exclusively. Nick's new girlfriend (Carmen Electra) makes him feel objectified, and Rita learns the truth about her poor financial state.
5	5	"Ego, Trips n' Salsa"	Mary Lou Belli	Tiffany Anderson & Adrienne Carter	October 13, 2003	4.41
Shelly and J.T. take salsa classes, but J.T. quits from frustration. When Shelly continues taking lessons with an attractive instructor, J.T. questions if he should sacrifice his ego and return to the classes for Shelly. Nick helps Rita move into a studio apartment and develops a crush on her.
6	6	"Check Tease"	Lee Shallat-Chemel (Note: Miscredited as "Lee Shallet-Chemel")	Torian Hughes	October 20, 2003	4.66
J.T. becomes frustrated that he has paid for all his dates with Shelly. He agrees to her offer to pay for dinner, unaware that she does not have enough money. Shelly asks Rita for help but gets sidetracked by an encounter with supermodel Kylie Bax. Nick borrows from Donovan's wardrobe in an attempt to make himself more attractive to women.
7	7	"Player Down"	Arlene Sanford	Trish Baker	November 3, 2003	3.66
For their three-month anniversary, J.T. and Shelly plan to go on a romantic weekend getaway until J.T. realizes he was already committed to play in a basketball tournament with his friends. He unsuccessfully attempts to soften the blow of canceling the trip with dinner and gifts. J.T. feels guilty and plays poorly in the game. He is angry on learning that Shelly went to a fraternity party with Rita's college boyfriend.
8	8	"Hi Mom"	Leonard R. Garner Jr.	Beverly D. Hunter	November 17, 2003	4.47
J.T.'s mother walks in on him in bed with Shelly who fears their romance will sour unless she can win his mother's acceptance and respect.
9	9	"Private Dancer"	Mary Lou Belli	David W. Duclon	November 18, 2003	4.76
J.T. is upset when Shelly discusses details of his bedroom antics with her friends, who disclose them to Missy Elliott in the nightclub Z Lounge during a celebration for Janie.
10	10	"The Ex Factor"	Brian K. Roberts	Janis Hirsch	November 24, 2003	4.68
When J.T.'s ex-girlfriend returns to Miami, Shelly feels insecure about their relationship and believes she must be more romantic to keep J.T. from temptation. Donovan is forced to train his boss' inept son to become a manager for Z Lounge.
11	11	"T'was the Fight Before Christmas"	Micheline Lanctôt	Michael Ajakwe Jr.	December 15, 2003	3.85
J.T. becomes fed up with the long hours Shelly is working during the holidays, so his mother decides to set him up with another woman; Donovan's ex-girlfriend visits with a plan to seduce him into returning to England.
12	12	"Just the Three of Us"	Mary Lou Belli	Anthony C. Hill	January 12, 2004	3.56
After drinking his apple juice, shattering his favorite beer mug, and walking in on him shadowboxing naked, Nick tells Shelly that she has overstayed her welcome at their townhouse, placing J.T. in the middle of a showdown between his best friend and his girlfriend. Janie thinks that Rita is becoming anorexic and tries to use her homemade lasagna to make her eat more. Donovan competes with a bartender to create the perfect drink for the Z Lounge.
13	13	"Valentine's Day Reloaded"	Gary Shimokawa	Trish Baker & Torian Hughes	February 9, 2004	3.69
On Valentine's Day, the friends debate if it was fate that Shelly and J.T. became acquainted. In a series of flashbacks to six months earlier, J.T. almost meets Shelly in line at a coffeehouse and later at DivaStyle. Shelly comes close to being seduced by an ex-boyfriend. However, at the last minute, she asserts her independence, puts on a sexy dress, and meets J.T. at a nightclub.
14	14	"Sister, Sister"	Gary Shimokawa	Beverly D. Hunter	February 16, 2004	3.94
Shelly's successful, fun-loving sister, Simone (Queen Latifah), comes for a visit. Shelly is frustrated to find herself slipping back into the role of over-shadowed little sister as Simone starts taking the limelight. J.T. and his friends attempt to build a brick barbecue for Simone's welcome party even though they have no experience building anything.
15	15	"Porn Free"	Mary Lou Belli	Trish Baker & Torian Hughes	February 23, 2004	3.77
Janie discovers Marty's secret porn collection and fears there's a problem in her marriage. She sets about trying to remedy the problem with help from Shelly and Rita. J.T. has made a new friend in Cedric the Entertainer. However, when this new friend never leaves his side, and becomes an annoyance, J.T. wonders how to "break up" with him.
16	16	"Party All the Time"	Mary Lou Belli	Tiffany Anderson & Adrienne Carter	March 1, 2004	3.13
When Shelly's college friend April comes to Miami, they spend the entire night crashing parties. Janie and Rita feel betrayed when they are abandoned outside a club with Jadakiss and his posse. J.T. introduces the group to his "D.J. Fine" persona while working as a substitute for the regular D.J. at Z Lounge.
17	17	"Hair is Stronger Than Pride"	Mary Lou Belli	Meg DeLoatch & Anthony C. Hill	March 29, 2004	3.97
Shelly convinces J.T. to visit her hairstylist Coleman. However, when J.T. voices his dissatisfaction with the haircut, they are both banned from the salon. Nick flirts with a delivery woman named Dani, but a jealous Rita attempts to convince him that the woman is more interested in her instead.
18	18	"Ride or Die Chick"	Mary Lou Belli	Michael Ajakwe Jr.	May 3, 2004	3.38
Shelly ends a fight involving J.T. by knocking the man out with a single punch, causing J.T. to feel that his masculinity has been undermined. Donovan breaks up with his latest girlfriend, and cons his friends into thinking she dumped him so he can get as much sympathy as possible from them.
19	19	"Pimps Us, DivaStyle Down"	Mary Lou Belli	Anthony C. Hill	May 10, 2004	4.01
Shelly, Rita, and Janie discover that their client Rodney P. Shelly is a pimp. Shelly refuses to do business with him, leading to Rodney calling his lawyers. Rodney's colleagues claim that DivaStyle discriminates against certain costumers and picket outside the store.
20	20	"For Love and Money"	Gary Shimokawa	Van Whitfield	May 17, 2004	2.45
After accidentally setting her car on fire, Shelly tries to borrow money from J.T. for a down payment on a new automobile. When he refuses, she begins to question their relationship. Rita has an extra ticket to a charity event and asks Donovan to be her escort. The pair share a surprise kiss at the end of the evening.
21	21	"They've Come Undone, Part 1"	Leonard R. Garner Jr.	Trish Baker & Torian Hughes	May 24, 2004	3.53
J.T. is humiliated when he and his parents watch a video of Shelly and her friends topless and drunk in a new commercial for a racy reality video. Marty grounds his wife Janie after seeing her in the video. Nick tries to deal with the fact that Dani has her ex-lover's name tattooed on her bottom. Donovan and Rita avoid each other realizing they have feelings for one another.
22	22	"They've Come Undone, Part 2"	Mary Lou Belli	Meg DeLoatch	May 24, 2004	3.53
J.T. tells Shelly that he is not interested in marrying her because of her involvement in the reality video commercial. Donovan and Rita continue trying to avoid what happened between them.

=== Season 2 (2004–05) ===
Shelly and J.T. break up at the beginning of the second season but continue a friends with benefits relationship. After discovering that she is bankrupt, Rita moves in with Janie to save money. She also begins a relationship with Donovan. When Janie becomes annoyed with Rita for staying at her home for a long time, Rita persuades J.T. and Nick to let her stay with them instead. Shelly finds herself attracted to a younger man, and J.T. becomes jealous realizing that he is in love with her. In the season finale, both men propose to Shelly. At the same time, Donovan's application for permanent residency is rejected and the friends prepare for his return to England.

No. overall	No. in season	Title	Directed by	Written by	Original release date	U.S. viewers (millions)
23	1	"Over"	Leonard R. Garner Jr.	Meg DeLoatch	September 21, 2004	2.82
Shelly and J.T. discuss the future of their relationship. She is disappointed when J.T. will only agree to date her if she changes to better fit his ideal woman. Nick tries to pretend that Donovan and Rita's new relationship does not bother him given his past crush on her.
24	2	"Self Helpless"	Leonard R. Garner Jr.	Anthony C. Hill	September 28, 2004	3.21
To cope with her break-up with J.T., Shelly follows advice from a self-help book and spends more time by herself. She quickly realizes that she really needs the support of her friends. Nick helps J.T. get back into the dating scene, causing Dani to question if Nick is fully committed to their relationship.
25	3	"All My Exes Havin' Sexes"	Leonard R. Garner Jr.	Michael Ajakwe Jr.	October 5, 2004	3.72
Shelly decides to pursue a friends with benefits relationship with J.T. despite her friends' protests. She feels conflicted when she starts acting like they are still a couple. J.T. tries to convince Nick that Shelly broke the pool table with him and not Donovan.
26	4	"The Hate-Trix Reloaded"	Mary Lou Belli	David W. Duclon & Walt Kubiak	October 12, 2004	3.52
After their unsuccessful first date, Donovan decides to take Rita to a hot new Miami club. Shelly continues following the advice in a self-help book and asks J.T. to return her uncollected possessions. He responds by asking her to repay the money he loaned her first.
27	5	"Footloose"	Mary Lou Belli	Janis Hirsch	October 19, 2004	3.83
When Shelly is injured, she is forced to ask J.T. for some medical advice. A jealous J.T. decides instead to sabotage Shelly's plans by giving her bad medical advice after she is asked out by a handsome doctor. Donovan challenges Nick to become a manager of the Z Lounge for one night as part of a bet.
28	6	"Splice of Life"	Mary Lou Belli	Trish Baker	October 26, 2004	3.51
Rita moves in with Janie and they develop a new friendship apart from their shared relationship with Shelly. Shelly feels neglected as Rita and Janie bond over their Cajun roots. J.T. wants to watch a new sports package, but he refuses to pay for it after Nick added it to their cable without consulting him first.
29	7	"Friend or Foe?"	Ted Lange	Tiffany Anderson & Adrienne Carter	November 9, 2004	3.32
Rita and Janie warn Shelly to stop talking about her break-up with J.T. after she ruins their night out. Shelly turns to new friend, Claudia, who suggests getting revenge on her ex-boyfriend. Rita runs into problems while trying to sell the contents of her storage unit in a garage sale.
30	8	"Love TKO"	Leonard R. Garner Jr.	Torian Hughes	November 23, 2004	2.99
J.T. becomes jealous after Shelly starts dating a buff boxer named Adrian. Shelly fears she might end up with Rita as her roommate, so she decides to help Janie and Rita who are having hard time living together.
31	9	"Above Average Joe"	Leonard R. Garner Jr.	Torian Hughes	November 30, 2004	3.38
Janie has to make peace between Shelly and Rita, who are competing for the affections of a charming bachelor with a yacht. J.T. decides to take a new direction when meeting a woman who is waiting to meet "her special guy."
32	10	"Dateless in Miami"	Mary Lou Belli	Michael Ajakwe Jr. & Trish Baker	December 14, 2004	3.19
On New Year's Eve, Shelly brings her new boyfriend to the Z Lounge party. Janie and Rita are angry with Shelly for breaking their "no dates" pact. The gang reminisces about their dating past, including J.T.'s relationship with a woman who thinks she is a superhero.
33	11	"Lights, Camera, Face Crack!"	Mary Lou Belli	Tiffany Anderson & Adrienne Carter	January 4, 2005	3.19
Shelly and the girls are shocked when Robert Verdi slams their dress worn by Brooke Burke on air, and it's obvious that their promotional opportunity has turned into a nightmare. Nick regrets taking piano lessons.
34	12	"Breast in Show"	Jody Margolin Hahn	Anthony C. Hill	January 11, 2005	3.63
Shelly and the girls have a lively debate when Shelly considers getting breast implants. J.T. and Donovan are determined to fix Nick's annoying habit of never picking up a check.
35	13	"Kung Fu Divas"	Leonard R. Garner Jr.	Beverly D. Hunter	February 8, 2005	2.15
Donovan starts dating an older woman named Rebecca. Everything is going fine until he attempts to set Nick and J.T. up with her friends. Rita and Shelly compete in a martial arts class after Rita turns out to be more adept.
36	14	"Wheeling and Dealing"	Mary Lou Belli	Janis Hirsch	February 15, 2005	2.39
When a potential buyer accidentally catches her using a handicapped parking spot, Shelly decides to pretend to be disabled. Nick and J.T. put up house rules for their new roommate, Rita.
37	15	"If the Shrew Fits"	Art Manke	David W. Duclon & Walt Kubiak	February 22, 2005	2.31
When Shelly and Rita's stepmother Lucy fight, Shelly decides to swallow her pride and be the first to apologize to guarantee Rita getting some financial help in the future. Nick tries to make a pass at Shelly when he learns J.T. slept with his ex-girlfriend in college.
38	16	"Prom Night"	Leonard R. Garner Jr.	Trish Baker	March 1, 2005	2.67
Shelly agrees to a "mercy date" with a younger man named Grant, but she develops a romantic attraction to him. Nick declares Z Lounge's Ladies Night discriminatory and demands that Donovan give the guys equal attention at the club.
39	17	"Moral Minority"	Leonard R. Garner Jr.	Judy Dent	March 29, 2005	2.60
Nick and J.T. suspect Donovan is keeping a secret from them. Rita and Shelly discover that Janie had a fling and now it's time for them to teach Janie that she cannot give them lectures on right and wrong anymore.
40	18	"Real Women Have Nerves"	Leonard R. Garner Jr.	Michael Ajakwe Jr.	April 19, 2005	2.45
Shelly tries to impress Grant by cooking dinner for him and decides to enlist her friends to help her in the kitchen. J.T. and Nick's year-old satellite radio stops working, so they attempt to call a variety of customer service representatives based in India to have it fixed.
41	19	"Testing Testing HIV"	Leonard R. Garner Jr.	Beverly D. Hunter	April 26, 2005	2.84
Grant tells Shelly about taking an HIV test because he is ready to take their relationship to the next level. His request encourages the entire gang to get tested too. J.T. realizes he is still in love with Shelly. Donovan learns his request for residency in the US has been denied, and he must leave the country within 30 days.
42	20	"Resident Aliens"	Mary Lou Belli	Michael Ajakwe Jr. & Anthony C. Hill	May 3, 2005	2.31
When Coleman's hair salon is suddenly shut down, Shelly and the girls decides to let him set up his business in their shop, but they regret the decision as soon as Coleman starts taking over DivaStyle. The gang also learns that Donovan's request for residency has been denied following an immigration raid on Z Lounge.
43	21	"Taken For Grant-ed"	Mary Lou Belli	Trish Baker & Janis Hirsch	May 10, 2005	2.28
Shelly questions her relationship when Grant takes her on a camping trip. Rita and Janie try to spend more time with Donovan, but their attempt is delayed when he is invited to a swimsuit model party with Nick. J.T. decides to confess his love to Shelly.
44	22	"Stay Tuned"	Mary Lou Belli	Torian Hughes	May 24, 2005	3.00
J.T. spots Janie and Grant at a jewelry store buying an engagement ring for Shelly. He is faced with a tough decision, and after consulting with his parents and friends, J.T. decides to propose to Shelly at her birthday party as well. Donovan tries to avoid tearful goodbyes, so he leaves and discusses his future with a cab driver.

=== Season 3 (2005–06) ===
In the third-season premiere, Shelly accepts J.T.'s marriage proposal. Donovan gets a work visa after finding a job selling makeup products for a British company. Shelly and J.T. break up again, resolving to remain just friends. J.T. pursues a career in medicine and enrolls in the Miami State Medical School. However, he finds out that college is more difficult than he initially thought, and struggles with his classes and finances. During the spring, Rita reignites her relationship with Donovan and buys her own apartment. In the series' finale, Beverly finally admits to Yusef, Shelly's father, that she is carrying his child; Shelly questions his ability to be a father again. The series ends in a cliffhanger, with Janie, Rita, and Donovan arrested for illegally selling BOTOX at DivaStyle.

No. overall	No. in season	Title	Directed by	Written by	Original release date	U.S. viewers (millions)
45	1	"How Will I Know?"	Mary Lou Belli	David W. Duclon & Walt Kubiak	September 22, 2005	3.43
Shelly is left to decide between two marriage proposals from J.T. and Grant. Donovan, who skipped his flight back to England, is now living as an illegal alien must decide what to do with his life.
46	2	"Shelly And?"	Mary Lou Belli	Meg DeLoatch	September 29, 2005	3.21
Shelly starts planning her wedding to J.T., but an unexpected visit from her mother makes her rethink her decision. J.T. is accepted into medical school. Donovan finds a way to stay in the U.S. legally.
47	3	"Three Divas, No Style"	Mary Lou Belli	Torian Hughes	October 6, 2005	2.76
When Rita and Janie realize that Shelly frequently ignores their creative input in DivaStyle, they start their own clothing line. This leads to a fierce competition between the women. J.T. realizes medical school is not as easy as he thought it would be. Nick regrets dating a co-worker.
48	4	"The Lyin', the Witch and the Wardrobe"	Reggie Life	Trish Baker	October 13, 2005	3.47
A night of grazing on junk food leads the gang to realize they can each stand to lose some weight. Shelly cheats on her diet, and crosses the line when she can't fit into her clothes. The diet agreement is also put in danger when Janie enlists the gang to help her prepare for her church bake sale.
49	5	"The Price of Friendship"	Mary Lou Belli	Anthony C. Hill	October 20, 2005	2.67
A severe storm makes the gang confront issues around greed and faith. Shelly squabbles with Janie over her lottery winnings, while Nick has a religious experience.
50	6	"Break Up to Make-Up"	Kim Fields	Trish Baker	October 27, 2005	2.72
Rita wants to be the face of DivaStyle, but Shelly and Janie oppose the idea. Rita threatens to leave their partnership. Donovan gets Nick hooked on makeup for men.
51	7	"Model Behavior"	Art Manke	Vivien Mejia	November 3, 2005	2.44
Shelly and Janie select a hot young model to represent the new DivaStyle line, and discover that Rita is modeling for a rival brand. Nick is tempted by J.T.'s study partner
52	8	"Janie, Shut Up!"	Leonard R. Garner Jr.	Michael Ajakwe Jr. & Torian Hughes	November 10, 2005	2.79
Janie spills some of the gang's secrets on a live radio show with Tom Joyner, affecting the budding relationship between Rita and Nick.
53	9	"Brit Better Have My Money"	Leonard R. Garner Jr.	Randi Barnes	November 17, 2005	3.21
Rita hires a firm to produce DivaStyle's new line, but the women attract unwanted press when it comes out the company is a sweatshop. Donovan convinces Nick and J.T. to help him sell make-up.
54	10	"Marty in the Middle"	Art Manke	Katina Weaver	November 24, 2005	1.83
Janie overhears Marty's flattering comments about Shelly and becomes convinced he still has an interest in her. She accuses Shelly of trying to steal her man. J.T. ignores his studies to go out partying with Donovan, and he pays the price by doing poorly in school.
55	11	"All About Eve"	Angela Barnes Gomes	Anthony C. Hill	December 15, 2005	2.73
Shelly becomes jealous when one of her mother's students replaces her as the center of attention. J.T., Donovan, and Nick decide to watch football instead of celebrating the holidays, but soon come to realize how much they miss the tradition.
56	12	"Banishing Acts"	Leonard R. Garner Jr.	Michael Ajakwe Jr.	January 19, 2006	2.02
J.T.'s new girlfriend, Rochelle, is threatened by his former relationship with Shelly and his friends, so she demands that he choose between her or his friends. Janie decides to change her outlook and attitude when one of the waitresses mistakes her for Shelly's mother.
57	13	"Diva Day Care"	Eric Dean Seaton	Beverly D. Hunter	February 2, 2006	1.97
Shelly believes she's unfit to ever be a mother when Janie brings her cousin's infant to DivaStyle and Shelly drops the child. Nick plays for an all-gay basketball team, but hurts his teammates with his insensitivity.
58	14	"Mo' Money, Mo' Problems"	Alfonso Ribeiro	Randi Barnes	February 9, 2006	2.43
The success of DivaStyle brings big bonus checks to the ladies, but also brings big problems for Shelly when she goes on a wild shopping spree. Janie learns her husband wants to quit his job. J.T. turns to Nick for a loan to cover his medical school expenses.
59	15	"Oh, Brother"	Leonard R. Garner Jr.	Clay Lapari & David Podemski	February 16, 2006	2.50
Shelly finds out that Janie's baby brother Paul still has a crush on her after all this time, but she does not know how to handle the situation now that he is an adult. Nick embarrasses the gang at Janie's church when he accidentally drops a $100 bill in the collection plate and then attempts to either get it, or some change, back.
60	16	"Rules of Engagement"	Leonard R. Garner Jr.	Katina Weaver	March 2, 2006	2.21
Shelly thinks she can be friends with her ex-boyfriend Grant, but her theory is tested when he announces he's engaged during a lunch date, and wants her to meet his fiancée. Rita moves into her new loft. Nick and J.T. become buds with a youngster through a local Big Buddies program.
61	17	"To Sir, With Mom"	Leonard R. Garner Jr.	Beverly D. Hunter	March 23, 2006	2.33
When J.T. fails an exam because of a stupid mistake, his overbearing mother tries to persuade the professor to give him a retest; Marty considers becoming a professional bowler. Shelly tries to help Rita set up her new apartment.
62	18	"Separate, But Unequal"	Leonard R. Garner Jr.	Torian Hughes	April 13, 2006	1.72
Nick finally finds a woman he wants to date exclusively, only to have her tell him she's married. Shelly discovers that Rita thinks her apartment is haunted.
63	19	"Girlfriends"	Leonard R. Garner Jr.	David Wyatt	April 20, 2006	2.28
Shelly and Janie cajole Rita into pretending she wants to get back together with Brenda after learning she's the buyer for a department store where they hope to display their clothing line. Donovan enlists Nick's help to win the money he lost in an expensive poker bet with J.T.
64	20	"Donovan on the Brink"	Leonard R. Garner Jr.	Michael Ajakwe Jr.	April 27, 2006	1.81
Everyone discovers out that Donovan was a pop star in England when a rapper asks his permission to sample one of his hits; Shelly tries to impress the man with her raps. Rita and Janie's attempt to write a romance novel has a hot conclusion.
65	21	"Daddy's Home"	Leonard R. Garner Jr.	Randi Barnes & Torian Hughes	May 4, 2006	2.07
Shelly is surprised when her estranged father Yusef shows up after being absent for years; she is even more shocked when her mother encourages her to give him a second chance. A curious Janie finds a large amount of money in Rita's purse, and decides to find out where she got it.
66	22	"Daughter Don't Preach"	Leonard R. Garner Jr.	Vivien Mejia	May 11, 2006	1.80
Shelly's mother Beverly finally admits to Yusef, Shelly's father, that she is carrying his child, and Shelly questions his ability to be a father again. Janie finds out that Rita is having Botox parties after hours at DivaStyle. Nick is caught in a love triangle when Lynn tries to break it off with her husband, Jamal.
