= Good News (TV series) =

American sitcom

- Main cast
- Also known as: The Good News
- Genre: Sitcom
- Created by: Ed. Weinberger
- Written by: David Chambers; Rob Dames; Richard Dubin; Robert Howe; Leonard Ripps; Danice Rollins
- Directed by: Charlotte Brown; Stan Daniels; Kim Friedman; Anna Maria Horsford; Tony Singletary; Ed. Weinberger
- Starring: David Ramsey; Roz Ryan; Guy Torry; Jazsmin Lewis; Tracey Cherelle Jones; Alexia Robinson
- Composer: Bill Maxwell
- Country of origin: United States
- Original language: English
- No. of seasons: 1
- No. of episodes: 22

Production
- Executive producers: Reuben Cannon; Robi Reed-Humes; Ed. Weinberger; Samm-Art Williams
- Producers: Bruce Johnson; DeShawn Schneider
- Running time: 22–24 minutes
- Production companies: The Weinberger Company; MTM Enterprises (1997); 20th Century Fox Television (1998)

Original release
- Network: UPN
- Release: August 25, 1997 – May 19, 1998

Related
- Sparks

Good News (also known as The Good News) is an American sitcom that aired on UPN from August 25, 1997, to May 19, 1998. The series was the final television series produced by MTM Enterprises, which was folded into 20th Century Fox Television, in 1997 (MTM's then-remaining programs, Good News and The Pretender (1996–2000), were produced by 20th Century Fox Television for the rest of their runs).

== Synopsis ==
The series focused on David Randolph (David Ramsey), a young acting pastor designated to Compton, California's African American Church of Life. Initially, the majority of the church's members balk at the young pastor's new position and resent him replacing their former pastor. With the help of the church's secretary, Vera Hudson (Rose Jackson Moye), Randolph attempts to reunite the church and help his congregation.

Other cast members included Roz Ryan as Hattie, the church's cook, Tracey Cherelle Jones as the church's youth director, Guy Torry as a choir member and janitor.

== Cast ==
- David Ramsey as David Randolph
- Roz Ryan as Hattie Dixon
- Tracey Cherelle Jones as Cassie Coleman
- Jazsmin Lewis as Venita Stansbury
- Guy Torry as Little T
- Alexia Robinson as Mona Phillips
- Rose Jackson Moye as Vera Hudson (pilot only)

== Episodes ==
No.	Title	Directed by	Written by	Original release date	Prod. code	U.S. viewers (millions)
1	"Pilot"	Ed. Weinberger	Ed. Weinberger	August 25, 1997	09101	4.44
Pastor Randolph arrives at his new church, only to find that the ministers & staff are quite upset that their previous pastor had chosen an outsider to be his replacement, and all have decided to quit and form their own church and take half the congregation with them. Even the cute church secretary has to quit because of her mom.
2	"Writing on the Wall"	Stan Daniels	Lenny Ripps & Rob Dames	September 1, 1997	09102	4.23
Pastor Randolph decides its time to remove the gang graffiti from the walls outside the church. This angers the gang members and strikes fear into the hearts of the church congregation. Now the pastor has to find a way to mend fences, stand up for his faith, and bring everyone together in peace, love and harmony.
3	"Ashes to Ashes"	Stan Daniels	Samm-Art Williams	September 8, 1997	09103	4.34
Pastor Randolph loses one of his members and has to prepare for preaching his first funeral. A stuttering man gets "in the Spirit" during the funeral and begins to speak fluently for the first time.
4	"The Baby on the Door Step"	Stan Daniels	Samm-Art Williams & David Chambers	September 15, 1997	09106	4.10
Pastor Randolph must play Solomon when his parishioners square off over their rights to adopt Joey (Evijan Watson), a four-year-old found abandoned in the church.
5	"The Dinner Party"	Kim Friedman	Ron Nelson & Mark Steen	September 22, 1997	09105	3.75
Pastor Randolph abstains from handing out condoms that have been donated to the church.
6	"A Joyful Noise"	Anna Maria Horsford	Bernadette Luckett	September 29, 1997	09108	4.87
Mona, a new member at the church, tries to host a party. But things get out of hand when rival gangs show up.
7	"Try a Little Tenderness"	Stan Daniels	Myra J.	October 13, 1997	09110	4.79
Pastor Randolph tries to convince young bride-to-be Cynthia Porter to reconcile with her estranged father before her wedding and to include him in the ceremony. Cynthia is ashamed of her father because he is a little person. Meanwhile, Mr Porter makes a big jump for Mrs Dixon.
8	"The Fallen Woman"	Stan Daniels	David Chambers	October 27, 1997	09104	4.62
Pastor Randolph needs a root canal, but his dentist and his bride-to-be are having problems in their relationship because of her past, and he is in no condition to perform the root canal. Pastor Randolph needs to hurry up and patch their relationship back up, so his can get his painful tooth problem fixed.
9	"Show Me the Money: Part 1"	Kim Friedman	Robert Howe	November 3, 1997	09109	3.94
The church choir agrees to sing in a televised 24-hour telethon.
10	"Show Me the Money: Part 2"	Ed. Weinberger	Robert Howe	November 10, 1997	09113	4.48
The church choir has a hard time completing the telethon they agreed to sing in. They try to finish it in order to receive the money that's been promised to them.
11	"There's an Old Flame: Part 1"	Kim Friedman	Rob Dames & Lenny Ripps	November 17, 1997	09111	5.20
One of Pastor Randolph's old girlfriends comes to town and attempts to seduce him. However, Pastor Randolph is reluctant to respond to her advances because it would make his image look bad.
12	"There's an Old Flame: Part 2"	Charlotte Brown	Rob Dames & Lenny Ripps	November 24, 1997	09112	4.42
Rev. Randolph realizes his true calling when a romantic moment with Joanne (Tanya Boyd) is interrupted by a suicidal man who's perched on the ledge of her suite.
13	"A Christmas Story"	Charlotte Brown	Leilani Downer	December 16, 1997	09116	3.45
The Christmas pageant is fouled up when Joey's duck eats one of Mrs. Dixon's earrings. Meanwhile, a snowstorm reminds Pastor Randolph of home at the holidays.
14	"Love, Honor & Obey"	Anna Maria Horsford	David Chambers & Darice Rollins	January 12, 1998	09114	4.58
Pastor Randolph intercedes on behalf of a wife-turned-comedienne (Amelia McQueen) whose husband finds her choice of profession no laughing matter.
15	"The Reunion"	Charlotte Brown	David Chambers & Darice Rollins	January 19, 1998	09115	4.12
Pastor Randolph's plan to raise money for a new furnace hinges upon whether Mrs. Dixon will take a little person (Dana Woods) to her class reunion.
16	"Back in the Day: Part 1"	Unknown	Unknown	February 16, 1998	09117	3.80
The church decides to put on a talent show to raise money for the children's summer camp, bringing together a collection of some strange talents from the congregation.
17	"Back in the Day: Part 2"	Unknown	Unknown	February 23, 1998	09118	3.02
Randolph takes steps to keep Beans (Reynaldo Rey) sober, but faces a higher power, stage fright, when the two perform at the church's variety show.
18	"Amazing Grace"	Michael Elias	Michael Elias	March 2, 1998	09119	3.72
Race relations become an issue when a parishioner dies, leaving his kids in the care of his brother, who has been passing himself off as white.
19	"Gospelfest: Part 1 (AKA Lift Every Voice)"	Unknown	Unknown	April 28, 1998	09123	2.91
Part 1. Pastor Randolph hits a sour note with Mrs. Dixon after he gives away her gospel-competition solo to Cassie's aunt Shirley (Shirley Caesar).
20	"Gospelfest: Part 2"	Unknown	Unknown	May 5, 1998	09121	3.17
Part 2. Lou Rawls aids Pastor Randolph in pepping up the choir as the prepare for a national competition.
21	"Driving Blind"	Charlotte Brown	Rob Dames & Lenny Ripps	May 12, 1998	09120	2.38
After devouring a batch of rum-spiked cookies, a tipsy Pastor Randolph labors to get a blind man and his pregnant wife to the hospital safely.
22	"Under the Influence"	Michael Elias	Rob Dames & Lenny Ripps	May 19, 1998	09122	2.42
Pastor Randolph faces the legal system when he's arrested for drunkenly allowing a blind man to drive his expectant wife to the hospital.
