= Kirk Taylor =

American actor, acting teacher, and musician

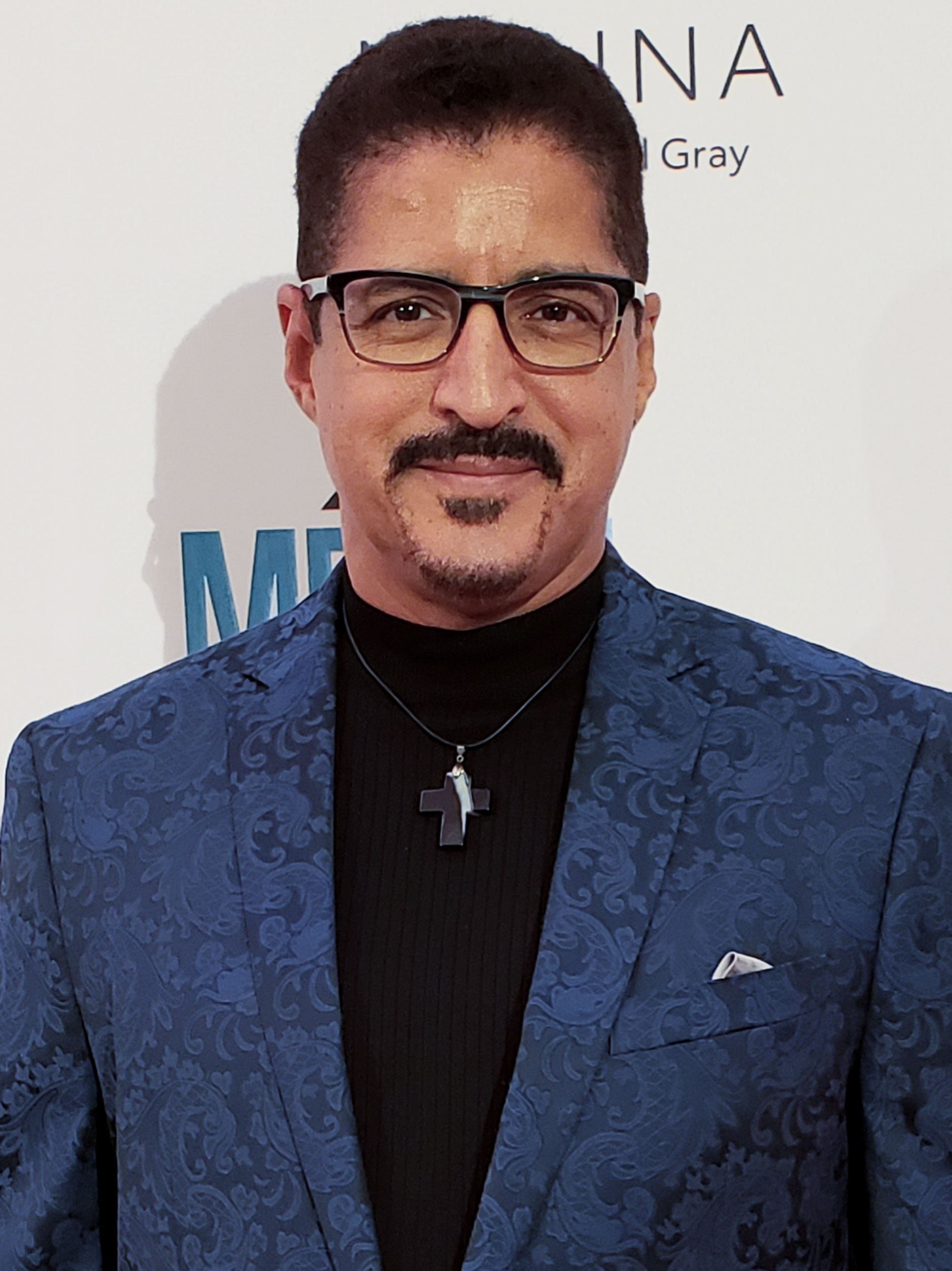
- December 6, 2018
- Born: Kirk Taylor; Bridgeport, Connecticut, US
- Website: Official Website

Kirk Beecher Taylor is an American actor, acting teacher, and musician with credits in film, television, and stage. He is best known for his work in the movies Full Metal Jacket, Death Wish 3, School Daze, The Last Dragon, The Angriest Man in Brooklyn and the Broadway Tour of Five Guys Named Moe. His television credits include portraying the prophet Ezekiel in The Chosen and Dr. Morris in Days of Our Lives.

== Early life ==
The oldest of five children, Taylor was raised in Bridgeport, Connecticut, by Dr. Robert Beecher Taylor and Rose Marie Taylor. He started performing on stage at Central High School.

Taylor was the first Black student to become the coveted King of The Barnum Festival, a statewide scholastic and leadership competition. He also played in a local R&B group, The Mighty Chain Reaction alongside guitar sensation, Jonathan Dubose Jr.

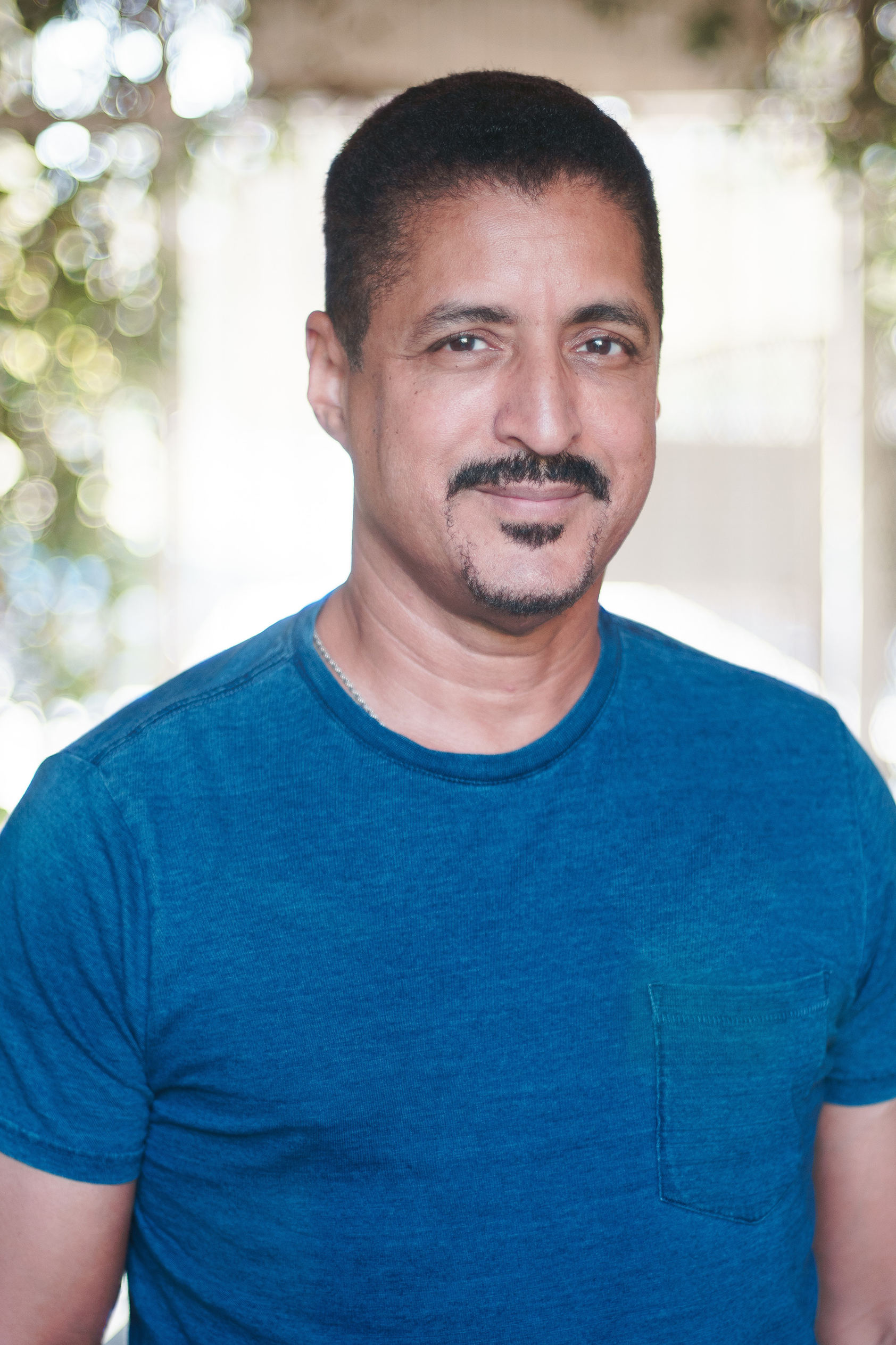
March 15, 2017

== Education ==
Taylor attended New York University's Tisch School of the Arts where he received a BFA (major in drama and minor in music). He studied acting under Lee Strasberg, Stella Adler, David Garfield, Barbara Covington Poitier, David Gideon, Irma Sandrey, Elaine Aiken and Clay Stevens.

He studied composition with Lehman Engel and Vladimir Padwa; voice with Helen Lightner and Kenneth Kamal Scott; piano with John Randolph Eaton and Don Friedman; trumpet with Jimmy Owens. Taylor was a founding member of the Awamu Theater Company, New York University's first and only African American repertory company.

== Career ==
=== Stage ===
In 1993, Taylor took center stage as Nomax in the first Broadway tour of Five Guys Named Moe, a jubilant musical featuring the songs of legendary band leader Louis Jordan. In preceding years, he graced the Off-Broadway stage as George the Barman in Take Me Along (1985), Bagheera the Panther in Mowgli (1985), Joey Robbins in The War Party (1986), and toured as jazz giant Jelly Roll Morton in Jelly Roll! The Music & The Man (1997). Taylor also performed as Edmond in the Off-Off-Broadway production of King Lear (1990) as part of the Brooklyn Shakespeare Company.

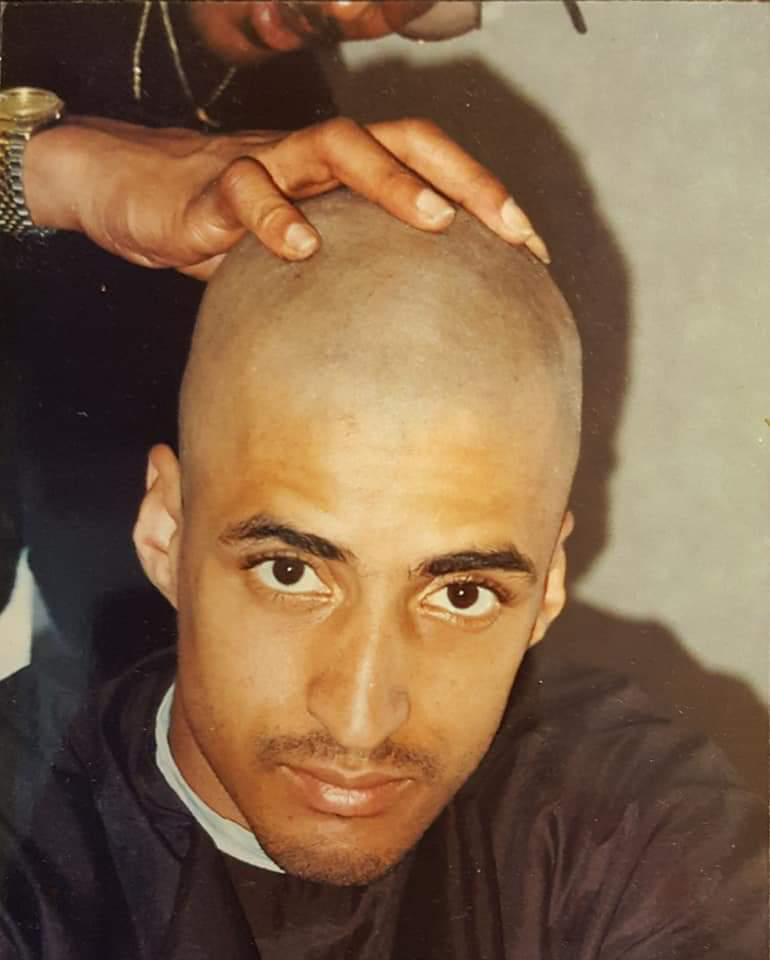
May 23, 1987

On the West Coast, he depicted the patriarch Dr. George Gibbs in Our Town (1998) with South Coast Repertory, General Vershinin in Three Sisters with Actor's Alley (2000) and was the lead opposite the "Queen of Funk" Chaka Khan in the Stevie Wonder-inspired Las Vegas tribute show Signed, Sealed, Delivered (2002).

Taylor appeared in the touring production of What Men Don't Tell (2004), which included performances at the Beacon Theatre on Broadway. In 2019, he joined the renowned Denver Center for the Performing Arts where he played the dual roles of Captain and trumpet-playing Fabian in their winter production of Shakespeare's Twelfth Night.

=== Film ===
In 1984, Taylor began his film career as Flash the waiter in Francis Ford Coppola's The Cotton Club. In the following years, he embodied some memorable characters: Crunch in The Last Dragon, The Giggler in Death Wish 3, Sgt Payback in Stanley Kubrick's celebrated war drama Full Metal Jacket, and Sir Nose in Spike Lee's 1988 collegiate classic, School Daze.

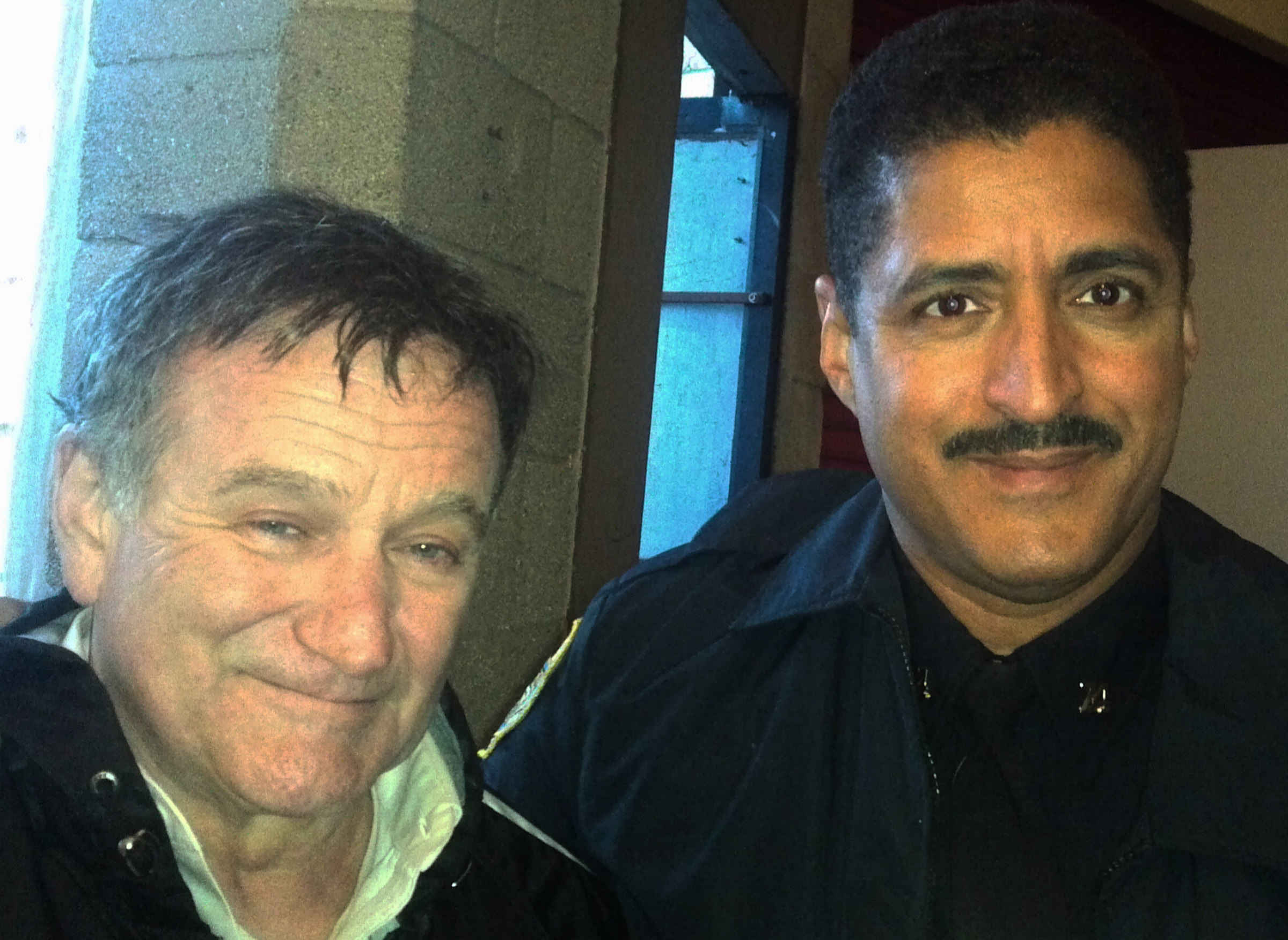
February 20, 2013

He can also be seen in other noteworthy films such as Jacknife with Robert De Niro, The Return of Superfly with Sam Jackson, Bonfire of the Vanities, MacArthur Park, and The Sum of All Fears as AFRAT Specialist Wesson in 2002. Taylor appeared alongside Robin Williams in The Angriest Man in Brooklyn in 2014. In 2017, he was cast as Referee Burton in the indie feature 12 Round Gun, and starred as Cephas in Harry Lennix's musical feature film, Revival! (2018).

=== Television ===
Taylor made his television debut in 1981 on the long-running soap opera Guiding Light. He played a recurring role opposite Kevin Bacon as his football player teammate. Since then, his television credits have included True Blue, Law & Order, Ghost Writer, Chicago Hope, and To Have and To Hold. In 2000, Taylor joined an all-star cast to portray the role of Roland Brown in the TNT television movie Freedom Song. Working alongside stars Danny Glover and Loretta Devine, the film documented the true life struggles of the SNCC civil rights workers. In 2001, he landed the starring role of Sterling Hamilton in BET's One Special Moment. He can also be seen as British arms dealer Paul Green on NCIS: Los Angeles, French attorney Gilles Lemaire in the final season of All My Children and Dr. Morris on Days of Our Lives .

=== Music ===
Taylor has been a featured soloist in numerous ensembles and events, including the New Song Gospel Choir at The Church on the Way under the direction of Rose "Sly and the Family" Stone (2004–2009), the international broadcast of Hour of Power at the famed Crystal Cathedral (2010–2012), The Havana Jazz Festival (2016) and Herbie Hancock's International Jazz Day concert at Saint Peter's "Jazz" Church in New York City (2018), which was subsequently broadcast by Queens Public Television in 2020.

In 2014, Taylor made his Carnegie Hall debut in the Broadway Reunion with Black Stars of the Great White Way under the direction of four-time Grammy Award-winning vocal arranger Chapman Roberts. Taylor was also part of a similar show The Black Stars of The Great White Way: A Chapman Roberts Concept when it appeared at National Black Theatre Festival in Winston-Salem, N.C. Taylor owns the ASCAP-registered publishing company Rising Oak Music.

=== Teaching ===
Taylor taught acting at the Lee Strasberg Institute in New York City (1988–1993), for the Young People's, Professional, and NYU programs.

His students have included Jessie L. Martin, Chandra Wilson, Gary Dourdan, Karina Lombard, Charles Malik Whitfield, Jose Zuniga, Beth Littleford, Ken Marino, Mari Morrow, and Benno Fürmann.

Taylor teaches 3-5 day acting intensives through his Art Group Acting Company in Montreal, Los Angeles, and at the University of Nations in Hawaii and Norway.

Taylor reflected on his acting career with Hollywood Toto:

I do see it as important ... it illuminates things in the world, gives voice to things, creates change, even. Washington is the seat of power ... Hollywood is the seat of influence..

== Filmography ==
=== Film ===
Year	Title	Role	Notes
1984	The Cotton Club	Flash The Waiter	Film debut, uncredited
1985	The Last Dragon	'Crunch'	
1985	Death Wish 3	'The Giggler'	
1987	Full Metal Jacket	Sgt. Payback	
1987	Heart	Fighter 1	
1988	School Daze	Sir Nose	
1989	Jacknife	Helicopter Gunner	
1990	The Return of Superfly	Renaldo	
1990	The Bonfire of the Vanities	Aide	
2001	MacArthur Park	Officer Randolph Davis	
2002	The Sum of All Fears	AFRAT Specialist Wesson	
2003	Jonah	Angel	Short
2009	Three Breaths	Enoch	Short
2009	Stealing Home	Caesar	Short
2009	Open Door	'Slim'	Short
2011	Fly by Knight	Calvin Knight	Short
2014	The Angriest Man in Brooklyn	Police Officer	
2017	12 Round Gun	Referee Burton	
2019	Revival!	Cephas	

=== Television ===
Year	Title	Role	Notes
1981	Guiding Light	Football Player	TV debut
1992	Law & Order	Dr. Reed	
1993	Ghost Writer	Coach Ward	Recurring
1996	Law & Order	Officer Graham	
1999	Chicago Hope	Paul Griffin	
2000	Freedom Song	Roland Brown	TV movie
2001	One Special Moment	Sterling Hamilton	Starring Role
2011	NCIS: Los Angeles	Paul Green	
2011	All My Children	Attorney Gilles Lemaire	-
2020	Days of Our Lives	Dr. Morris	Episode #13964
2025	The Chosen	Ezekiel	Episode "The Upper Room Part II"

=== Stage ===
Year	Title	Role	Notes
1978-1981	Cane, My Brother is Homemade, Wine in the Wilderness, Contributions, Voices for My People, An Evening of Poetry Music & Song	Various	NYU'S Awamu Theater Company (Founding Member)
1983	Last One in is A Rotten Egg	J.T.	The Kennedy Center, Washington DC
1984	The Prophet Nat	Lonnie	Off Off Broadway
1985	Take Me Along	George the Barman	Off Broadway
1985	Mowgli	Bagheera the Panther	Off Broadway
1986	The War Party	Joey Robbins	Negro Ensemble Company
1987	The Trial of Hansel and Gretel	Candy-Rapper	Was also the musical director and composer
1988	Don't Shoot My Dream	Soloist	Holland, The Netherlands
1990	King Lear	Edmund	The Brooklyn Shakespeare Company
1991	The Mask of St. George		Musical Director/ Composer and Co-Director
1993–1994	5 Guys Named Moe	Nomax	1st National Broadway Tour
1997	Jelly Roll! The Music & The Man	Jelly Roll Morton	National Tour
1998	Our Town	Dr. Gibbs	South Coast Repertory, Costa Mesa CA
1998	Three Sisters	General Vershinin	El Portal Theatre
2002	Signed, Sealed, Delivered (A Stevie Wonder Tribute)	Male Lead Singer opposite Chaka Khan	The Venetian, Las Vegas, NV
2004	What Men Don't Tell	Patrick	National Tour
2008-2013	Speak of Me as I Am (Paul Robeson Story)	Larry Brown	Was also the musical director
2014	Broadway Reunion	Ensemble Singer	Carnegie Hall
2015	Broadway Reunion 1st Anniversary	Soloist	National Black Theater Festival, Winston-Salem, NC
2016	Havana Jazz Festival	Soloist	Havana, Cuba
2018	Chapman Roberts' Broadway Jazz Festival (For International Jazz Day)	Soloist	Aired on Queens Public TV on 2020
2019	Twelfth Night	Captain & Fabian	Denver Center for the Performing Arts, Denver CO

=== Music videos ===
Year	Title	Artist
1986	"Nail It To The Wall"	Stacy Lattisaw
