= Eve (American TV series) =

American sitcom (2003-2006)

- Genre: Sitcom
- Created by: Meg DeLoatch
- Starring: Eve; Jason George; Ali Landry; Natalie Desselle-Reid; Brian Hooks; Sean Maguire
- Theme music composer: Missy Elliott; Soul Diggaz
- Opening theme: "The Opposite Sex" by Missy Elliott
- Composers: Joe Staxx; Armiques S. Wyche
- Country of origin: United States
- Original language: English
- No. of seasons: 3
- No. of episodes: 66 (list of episodes)

Production
- Executive producers: Bob Greenblatt; David Janollari
- Producers: Trish Baker; Anthony C. Hill; Torian Hughes; James Tripp-Haith
- Production locations: Sunset Gower Studios (Hollywood, Los Angeles, California)
- Camera setup: Multi-camera
- Running time: 20–22 minutes
- Production companies: The Greenblatt/Janollari Studio; Mega-Diva Inc. (2004–2006); Warner Bros. Television

Original release
- Network: UPN
- Release: September 15, 2003 – May 11, 2006

Eve is an American television sitcom created by Meg DeLoatch that originally aired for three seasons on UPN from September 15, 2003, to May 11, 2006. Featuring an ensemble cast consisting of Eve, Jason George, Ali Landry, Natalie Desselle-Reid, Brian Hooks, and Sean Maguire, the show revolves around two sets of male and female friends attempting to navigate relationships with the opposite sex. The executive producers were Robert Greenblatt and David Janollari; the series was produced by The Greenblatt/Janollari Studio and Mega Diva Inc. in association with Warner Bros. Television for UPN.

The series was developed as a vehicle for Eve under the working title The Opposite Sex; UPN executives approached the rapper about a television project after the success of fellow musician Brandy in another of the network's sitcoms, Moesha. Eve's series was created as part of the network's attempt to appeal to a younger demographic. After being picked up, the show was renamed Eve to attract the rapper's fans. It was set in Miami, but filmed at Sunset Gower Studios in Hollywood. Eve has stated that she was intimidated at first by the process of preparing for and filming a sitcom, and she would later regret not fully committing to her character. The show aired on UPN in its original run, and later in syndicated reruns on TV One and Cleo TV. UPN had promoted Eve as part of its new comedy block, one of four new comedies developed by the network.

Eve suffered low viewership in spite of its high ratings among young African-American women; it was canceled following UPN's merger with The WB Television Network (The WB) to launch The CW in 2006. The series' cancellation, along with that of other black sitcoms, was criticized by media outlets for reducing representation of African-American characters and the number of roles for African-American actors on television. Critical response to Eve was mixed; some praised its inclusion as a part of UPN's line-up of black sitcoms, but others felt Eve lacked charisma, and that the series was inferior to its contemporaries. Despite the mixed reception, the show and its star received several award nominations. The series was later released on the iTunes Store, Amazon Video, and HBO Max.

== Premise and characters ==
Eve revolves around Miami fashion designer Shelly Williams (Eve), "a woman whose fashion career is on the move but whose love life is a work in progress". At the start of the series, Shelly has been unable to find a suitable partner for ten months. She begins an on and off relationship with physical therapist Jeremiah Thurgood "J.T." Hunter (Jason George), which is nearly derailed when he cries while they watch Casablanca on their first date. Both characters turn to two of their close friends for advice on the opposite sex, love, and relationships. Shelly frequently looks for advice from former model Rita Lefleur (Ali Landry) and married friend Janie Egins (Natalie Desselle-Reid), while J.T. finds support in his best friends, nightclub manager Donovan Brink (Sean Maguire), and IRS worker Nick Dalaney (Brian Hooks).

Episodes typically depict the friends' comedic and romantic adventures and career issues, such as Shelly, Rita, and Janie working together at their Miami-based fashion boutique DivaStyle, and J.T. applying to colleges. The six characters each have many dates and serious relationships, and the series can be viewed as an extension of the concept of "the battle of the sexes" for its equal representation of both male and female viewpoints on the matter. Janie serves as Shelly's voice of reason, while Rita encourages her to be more impulsive with dating. They often disagree with one another on the best way for Shelly to approach her love life. Rita, Janie, Nick, and Donovan are typically shown caught in the middle of Shelly and J.T.'s miscommunications.

Even though Shelly and J.T.'s relationship is the predominant storyline, the series does explore the relationships of its supporting cast; Donovan and Rita date each other, and the quite-selective Nick attempts to find the perfect partner. Donovan manages the Z Lounge, which is described as "one of Miami's hottest clubs" and serves as one of the places where the group often meets. Other frequently recurring characters include Shelly's younger love interest Grant (Sharif Atkins), Janie's husband Marty (Reggie Gaskins), and Shelly's mother Beverly (Penny Johnson Jerald). Several celebrities also make cameo appearances on the show, including Queen Latifah, Missy Elliott, Brooke Burke, Vivica A. Fox, Morris Day, Antonio Fargas and Cedric the Entertainer.

== Episodes ==
Season	Episodes	Originally released	
Season	Episodes	First released	Last released
1	22	September 15, 2003	May 24, 2004
2	22	September 21, 2004	May 24, 2005
3	22	September 22, 2005	May 11, 2006

=== Season 1 ===
The first season introduces the six main characters: Shelly, J.T., Rita, Janie, Nick, and Donovan. Shelly runs the fashion boutique DivaStyle with her friends Janie and Rita. She pursues a relationship with J.T., only to discover he is afraid of commitment and exhibits some chauvinistic behavior. Their relationship is often tested by frequent misunderstandings. Nick wants to find his ideal partner, but his attempts are typically thwarted as he is very particular about women. Even though his relationship with a woman named Dani appears to be successful, they soon break up. Donovan finds himself romantically attracted to Rita, but he resists the temptation out of fear of ruining their friendship.

=== Season 2 ===
Shelly and J.T. break up at the beginning of the second season and pursue a friends with benefits relationship. After discovering that she is bankrupt, Rita moves in with Janie to save money. She also begins a relationship with Donovan. When Janie becomes annoyed with Rita for staying at her home for an extended period, Rita persuades J.T. and Nick to let her stay with them instead. Shelly finds herself attracted to a younger man, and J.T. becomes jealous, realizing that he is in love with her. In the season finale, both men propose to Shelly. At the same time, Donovan's application for residency is rejected, and the friends prepare for his return to England.

=== Season 3 ===
In the third-season premiere, Shelly accepts J.T.'s marriage proposal. Donovan gets a work visa after finding a job selling makeup products for a British company. Shelly and J.T. break up again, resolving to remain just friends. J.T. pursues a career in medicine and enrolls in the Miami State Medical School. He finds out that college is more difficult than he'd expected, and struggles with his classes and finances. During the spring, Rita and Donovan rekindle their relationship, and she buys her own apartment. In the series finale, Beverly finally admits to Yusef, Shelly's father, that she is carrying his child; Shelly questions his ability to be a father again. The series ends in a cliffhanger, with Janie, Rita, and Donovan arrested for illegally selling BOTOX at DivaStyle.

== Background ==
=== Conception ===
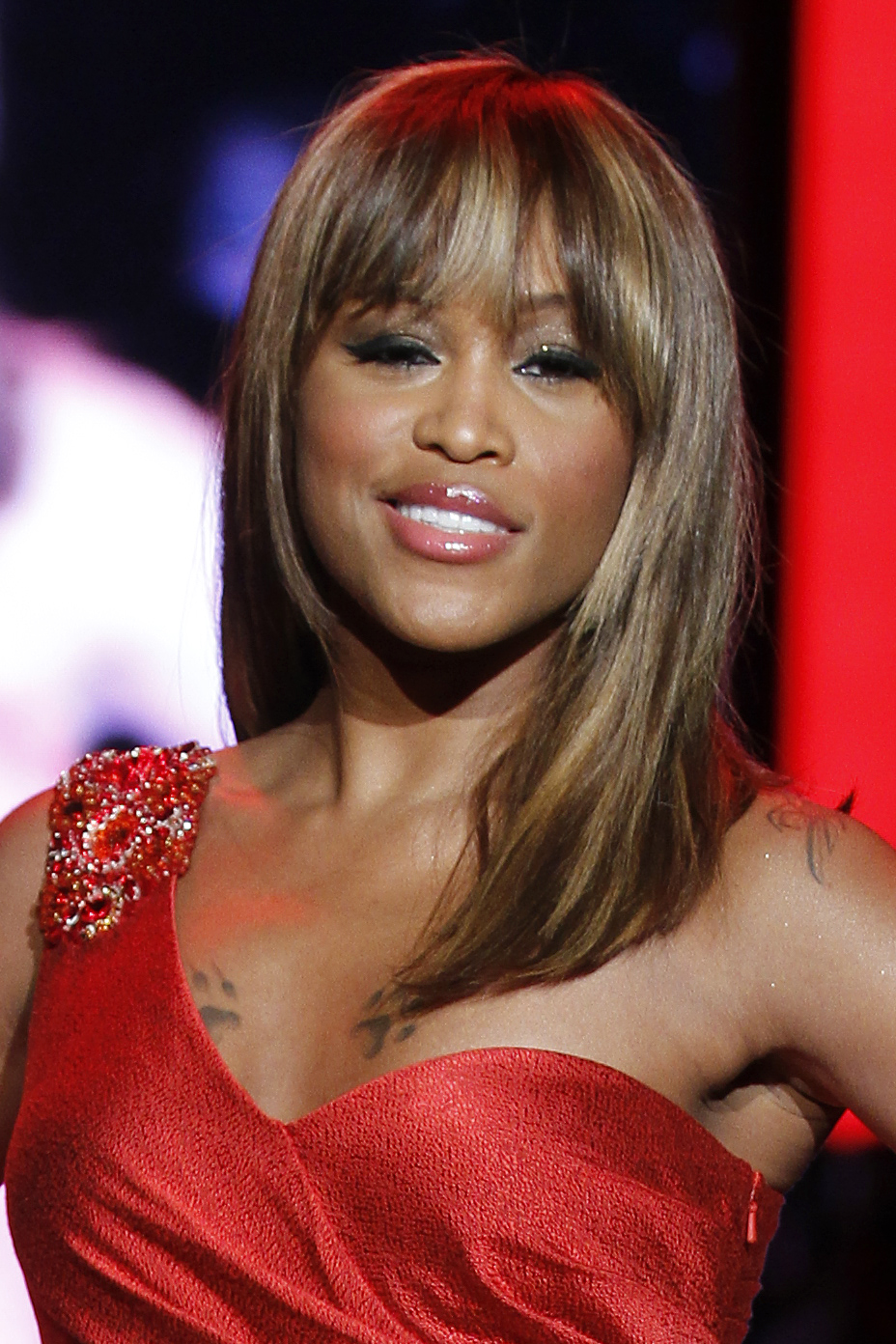
Eve (pictured here in 2011) starred throughout the series as Shelly Williams.

United Paramount Network (UPN) executives approached Eve about developing a television project following her performance of her rap single "Gangsta Lovin'" (2002) at an event marking the channel's 2002 season premieres. The network had pitched the idea to her prior to her appearances in the 2002 films XXX and Barbershop. Following their release, UPN renewed its interest in pursuing a series with Eve. She had developed the main premise behind the sitcom, in which she would star as a fashion designer with a supporting multi-ethnic ensemble. The show's creation was credited to television producer Meg DeLoatch. UPN executives designed the series as a vehicle for Eve following the positive response to fellow musician Brandy in another UPN sitcom, Moesha.

Eve accepted the role as a way to showcase a different side of her personality that was unexplored in her music. Her co-star Jason George commented that the show allowed the audience to see Eve as more than a hardcore rap artist, saying: "The part that people know the least about her comes across most in this show: There's a seriously girlie girl side to her." DeLoach emphasized the difference between Eve and her character Shelly Williams by saying, "She's bringing so much of herself to the role of Shelly but she's playing a character. Some of the things Shelly does aren't necessarily what Eve would do." To further distinguish herself as an actor, Eve decided against performing the show's theme song.

Publicized as the Untitled Eve Project in an early press release, the series had the working title The Opposite Sex before it was changed to reflect Eve's status as the star. She initially resisted the change and felt that The Opposite Sex was a stronger choice, but described it as a "corporate decision." According to her, UPN executives explained that the title would better attract the rapper's fans. They also felt that the audience would not be confused by the title Eve, despite Eve playing a character named Shelly. After the title was established, the show's premise was modified slightly, but remained centered around male and female friends discussing their love lives, and navigating their relationships with the opposite sex. While Eve described the series as "the PG version of Sex and the City", DeLoatch promoted Eve as unique for incorporating both male and female perspectives on dating and love. She further described the sitcom as "focus[ing] on one relationship and follow[ing] all of the ups and downs in it," with the purpose of "showing the male and female points of view." To achieve this goal, DeLoatch included male writers in the discussions of potential episodes and storylines to get their input.

=== Production and filming ===
Production was handled by The Greenblatt/Janollari Studio, Mega Diva Inc, and Warner Bros. Television. Robert Greenblatt and David Janollari served as the series' executive producers. DeLoatch, Troy Carter, David Duclon, and Eve also contributed to the series as co-executive producers. Rapper Missy Elliott wrote and performed the theme song, which was produced by Soul Diggaz. Eve was one of four new comedies developed by UPN for the 2003–04 television season, as part of a "new comedy block" including All of Us, Rock Me Baby, and The Mullets. A writer from Today described UPN's enlistment of Eve into a comedy as an example of the network's attempt to form its own identity through targeting a younger, multi-ethnic audience. In his book TV-a-Go-Go: Rock on TV from American Bandstand to American Idol, Jake Austen identified Eve as part of a trend in which musicians were prominently featured as the stars of television programs; he cited Brandy's role in Moesha and Queen Latifah on Living Single as two other examples.

By the time the series was officially announced during UPN's broadcast upfront presentations, Ali Landry, Natalie Desselle-Reid, and Brian Hooks were confirmed in the roles of Rita, Janie, and Nick, respectively. Bumper Robinson was originally slated to portray J.T., but was replaced by Jason George for undisclosed reasons. The role of Donovan was also recast, with original actor Eddie McClintock removed in favor of Sean Maguire. The supporting cast of Landry, Desselle-Reid, Hooks, and Maguire were described by Tom Jicha of the Sun-Sentinel as "peripheral," since they were written to "servic[e] the highs and lows of the romance between Shelly and J.T." With Shelly and J.T.'s relationship as the heart of the sitcom, Janollari expressed hopes that the episodes would follow them "from their meeting in the pilot, through the steps of a normal relationship, all the way, hopefully to marriage." In 2006, TV One began broadcasting the series as part of an agreement with Warner Bros. Domestic Cable Distribution. Along with All of Us, Eve marked the first time in which the channel acquired the rights for shows that were currently airing on network television. Cleo TV included syndicated reruns of Eve in 2019.

Even though the show was set in Miami, filming took place at Sunset Gower Studios in Hollywood. Stock exterior shots of Miami were used for the opening credits and transitions between scenes. The series was filmed with a multiple-camera setup, with each episode running 20 to 22 minutes, excluding commercials. Eve said she was initially intimidated by the amount of work required to prepare for and film a television series. During an interview with Billboard, she explained that while filming the first season she felt like she "just wanted to leave because there was so much to learn, it's just a different world". Since she found comedy to be challenging due to the "certain beats you have to learn," Eve hired two acting coaches to help improve her timing. One of her coaches was Chip Fields, who visited the show's set to offer Eve acting advice. During the development of the second season, Eve viewed the set as her home, and felt the process was easier, having grown closer to the cast and crew. In a 2016 interview with Grazia, she revealed her regret at not fully committing herself to her character and the series. She explained: "I was the youngest person on set, and was clubbing in between being on set and learning my lines. I look back and wish I was more dedicated. But I learned from it."

=== Cancellation ===
The show, as well as a majority of UPN's programs, was officially canceled when the network merged with The WB Television Network (The WB) to form The CW in 2006. Fern Gillespie of The Crisis was critical of UPN's decision to cancel the series given how the network, "in one swoop, wiped out five of its eight African-American comedies" with the creation of The CW. Gillespie expressed disappointment at the lack of African American sitcoms on the three major networks, saying: "Without that opportunity for some of the younger artists to hone and develop their skills, it will potentially have a generational impact." IndieWire's Dara T. Mathis identified Eve as an example of UPN's notable black sitcoms, and equated the cancellations of a majority of UPN's comedies as a sign that the genre was in a state of decline. Critic Tim Goodman noted that Eve was one of six shows "geared for an African-American audience," featuring "an African-American lead actress," that were canceled during the merger. He viewed these cancellations as a sign of networks "eliminat[ing] niche programming". Julian Kimble of Complex included Eve on a list of programs that "are often forgotten about," alongside other UPN sitcoms Half & Half and All of Us. The series has not been made available on Blu-ray or DVD, but it was released on the iTunes Store, Amazon Video, and HBO Max.

== Reception ==
=== Critical response ===
Eve has received mixed feedback since its first broadcast. Melanie McFarland of the Seattle Post-Intelligencer praised the changes made during the show's development, and highlighted Maguire as the standout. In reference to its transformation from the pilot, she described Eve as the "Eliza Doolittle of UPN comedies." The supporting cast was praised by David Hinckely of the New York Daily News, who wrote that they "form an entertaining and appropriately neurotic chorus behind Eve's relationship dance." Eve was compared to the UPN comedy Girlfriends by The New York Times' Alessandra Stanley, who regarded Eve as an appropriate lead with "an appealingly tough edge that matches the paw-print tattoos on her chest." Brian Josephs of Spin shared positive memories of African-American television shows on UPN, identifying Monday nights on the network as the place "where Eve transformed from Ruff Ryder to sitcom actress." Eve was listed by scholar Jake Austen as one of the shows "that emerged in the wake of the civil rights era" that served as "a dynamic showcase for black creativity." Tom Jicha provided a less enthusiastic review, stating that Eve was "just another cookie-cutter sitcom."

Eve drew criticism for its formulaic writing and the lead's performance. The show was included on a list by Ebony's Kevin L. Clark profiling the top ten worst black television shows of all time. Clark was critical of the episodes' titles, such as "Condom Mania," "She Snoops to Conquer," and "Porn Free," and wrote that they indicated an overuse of "outrageous clichés that boob-tube audiences would come to know and love once reality TV hit its boon." Arianna Davis of Refinery29 negatively compared Eve to 1990s black sitcoms, and determined that it was a part of the "rollout of campy shows ... that felt less like purposeful programming and more like cheap attempts at copying a successful advertising model." The Los Angeles Times' Mimi Avins felt that the show lacked the spark and the writing quality of Sex and the City, identifying Eve as its weakest link. She felt that Eve did not show "the acting ability or high-voltage charisma that vaulted Will Smith from rapper to television star" in The Fresh Prince of Bel-Air. During her review of the pilot episode, Melanie McFarland wrote that the sitcom lacked any potential due to Eve's poor performance on top of the "[t]errible scenery, cheap costumes, and a few glaring miscasts." Eve's decision to distance the series from her identity as a rapper was questioned by Roger Catlin of the Hartford Courant, who felt that the character of Shelly could have used "the personality charge" from Eve's life. Despite finding Eve a charismatic presence, Catlin felt that her acting, along with that of Ali Landry, was poorly developed. Echoing Catlin's assessment, the San Francisco Gate's Tim Goodman was critical of Eve's and Landry's performances. Goodman also wrote that the show was an example of "the worst writing on television," citing its homophobic jokes and its reliance on clichés.

=== Accolades ===
In spite of mixed reception from television critics, the show, and Eve's performance, received several award nominations. In 2004, the show was nominated for the Teen Choice Award for Choice Breakout TV Show. Eve was also nominated for Choice TV Actress: Comedy in the same year. Eve was nominated again for the Teen Choice Award for Choice TV Actress: Comedy in 2005. She also received two nominations for the Blimp Award for Favorite Television Actress during the 2005 and 2006 Kid's Choice Awards. Eve earned a nomination for the 2005 Image Award for Outstanding Actress in a Comedy Series, and the 2005 BET Awards Comedy Award for Outstanding Lead Actress in a Comedy Series.

=== Ratings ===
The table below shows Eve's ratings in the United States. "Rank" refers to how well Eve rated compared to other television series that aired during prime time hours of the corresponding television season. It is shown in relation to the total number of series airing on the then-six major English-language networks in a given season. "Viewers" refers to the average number of viewers for all original episodes broadcast during the television season in the series' regular time slot. The "season premiere" is the date that the first episode of the season aired, and the "season finale" is the date that the final episode of the season aired.

Ratings table
Season	Season premiere	Season finale	TV season	Rank	Viewers (in millions)
1	September 15, 2003	May 24, 2004	2003–04	167	3.65
2	September 21, 2004	May 24, 2005	2004–05	142	2.8
3	September 22, 2005	May 11, 2006	2005–06	145	2.3

According to The A.C. Nielsen Company, the show achieved high ratings among "Latina adolescents Ages 12–17," and earned 3.8 million viewers in that demographic in 2005. It was the second-highest UPN sitcom in the category, with only Everybody Hates Chris ranking above it in this demographic.
