= Los Angeles Web Series Festival =

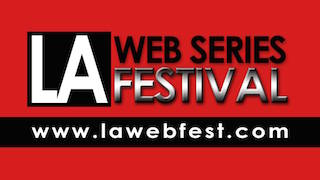
- Festival Logo
- Country: United States
- First award: 2010
- Website: http://www.lawebfest.net/

The Los Angeles Web Series Festival, more commonly known as the LA Web Fest, is a web series festival based in Los Angeles, California. It was founded in 2009 by Michael Okwudili Ajakwe Jr and was one of the first web series-based events; Filmmaker Magazine called it "the granddaddy of all webfests." The event has attracted controversy for its policies.

== Background ==
The festival had its first official event in 2010. The venue has changed several times since its inception, with the 2015 festival being held at the Hilton Universal City Hotel in Universal City.

When asked about the importance of web series as a creative medium by Carolyn Handler Miller for her book Digital Storytelling: A Creator's Guide to Interactive Entertainment, founder Michael Ajakwe, Jr. said:

Before, filmmaking was a rich man's game. And if you couldn't afford to make a film, a great voice might be lost ... Web series offer freedom.

Since the festival's inaugural presentation in 2010, it has helped produce web series-based festivals in several major cities around the world, including in Marseille (Marseille Web Fest), Melbourne (Melbourne Web Fest), Rio (Rio Web Fest) and Seoul (Seoul Web Fest).

=== 2018–Present: Revival and Leadership Change ===
Following the death of founder Michael Ajakwe Jr. in 2018, the festival went on a multi-year hiatus. In 2022, the festival was revived under the leadership of filmmaker Young Man Kang, who was appointed as the new festival director. Kang, an alumnus of the festival (2013) and founder of the Seoul Webfest, aimed to modernize the event by focusing on global partnerships and digital creators.

Under the new administration, the festival relocated to the Barnsdall Gallery Theatre in Hollywood. The 14th annual edition was held in 2023, marking the festival's return to in-person screenings, awarding over 40 prizes to international creators

== Controversy ==
In 2015, after other LA-based web series festivals scheduled their events around the same time (including the HollyWeb Festival and Indie Series Awards), Ajakwe came under fire for enforcing an 'exclusivity clause' stating that all entrants "must withdraw their shows from HollyWeb Fest and their award consideration at the ISAs, or be disqualified from LA WebFest."

The clause has since been the subject of controversy and derision in the web series community, with many calling it "anticompetitive" and "unreasonable." Ajakwe spoke to Snobby Robot about the issue, claiming it stems from earlier conflicts in 2012 when the Hollywood Web Series Festival planned their festival on the same weekend as the LA Web Fest.

The Daily Dot also published a story about the controversy, writing: "The battle lines are drawn in the emerging web fest world, as the venerable LA Web Fest has drawn an exclusivity line in the sand for its 2015 entrants."

=== Policy Reversal (2022) ===
Upon the festival's relaunch in 2022, the exclusivity clause that previously barred entrants from participating in other web festivals was officially removed. The new administration replaced this with an "open network" model, establishing partnerships with international festivals such as the Marseille Web Fest and Rio WebFest.

The festival currently utilizes a "Silver Ticket" exchange system, where award winners from partner festivals are automatically invited to screen at LA WEBFEST, and vice versa. Jean-Michel Albert, founder of the Marseille Web Fest and a critic of the previous policy, was named the festival's Honorary President in 2023, signaling the formal end of the isolationist policies.

== Recent Editions ==
| Edition | Dates | Venue | Notable Winners/Notes | Ref |
|---|---|---|---|---|
| 14th | May 4–5, 2023 | Barnsdall Gallery Theatre | Marked the festival's post-hiatus return. Over 40 awards presented. | |
| 15th | May 2–3, 2024 | Barnsdall Gallery Theatre | Featured series from major platforms including Netflix and Apple TV+. | |
| 16th | May 1–2, 2025 | Barnsdall Gallery Theatre | Continued expansion of the "Silver Ticket" program. | |

== Award categories ==
- Outstanding Comedy Series
- Outstanding Writing (Comedy)
- Outstanding Directing (Comedy)
- Outstanding Female Performance (Comedy)
- Outstanding Male Performance (Comedy)
- Outstanding Ensemble Performance (Comedy)
- Outstanding Drama Series
- Outstanding Writing (Drama)
- Outstanding Directing (Drama)
- Outstanding Female Performance (Drama)
- Outstanding Male Performance (Drama)
- Outstanding Ensemble Performance (Drama)
- Outstanding Action Series
- Outstanding Writing (Action)
- Outstanding Directing (Action)
- Outstanding Ensemble Performance (Action)
- Outstanding Animated Series
- Outstanding Music Video
- Outstanding Documentary Series
- Outstanding Variety Series
- Outstanding Educational Series
- Outstanding Directing (Non Fiction)
- Outstanding Writing (Non Fiction)
- Outstanding Cinematography
- Outstanding Editing
- Outstanding Costume Design
- Outstanding Production Design
- Outstanding Makeup
- Outstanding Soundtrack
- Outstanding Special FX
- Outstanding Sound Editing

== See also ==
- Web television
- List of Web television series
- Web series
