= A Romantic Christmas =

Studio album by John Tesh
- Released: 1992
- Studio: Look at the Lights Studio
- Genre: Holiday
- Length: 57:02
- Label: GTS Records
- Producer: John Tesh

John Tesh chronology
Garden City (1989)	A Romantic Christmas (1992)	Ironman Triathlon (1992)

Professional ratings
Review scores
Source	Rating
AllMusic	3/5 stars

A Romantic Christmas is the fourth studio album and first holiday album by John Tesh. It was released by GTS Records in 1992. The album peaked at No. 3 on the Billboard Holiday Albums chart, No. 8 on its New Age Albums chart, and No. 50 on the Billboard 200.

== Track listing ==
No.	Title	Writer(s)	Length
1.	"O Little Town of Bethlehem"	Phillips Brooks; Lewis H. Redner	2:30
2.	"Gesù Bambino"	Pietro Alessandro Yon	4:20
3.	"It Came Upon a Midnight Clear"	Richard Storrs Willis; Edmund Hamilton Sears	3:22
4.	"The First Noel"	Traditional	3:14
5.	"Panis Angelicus"	César Auguste Franck	3:22
6.	"O Holy Night"	Adolphe Adam; John Sullivan Dwight	4:52
7.	"Bring a Torch, Jeannette, Isabella"	Traditional	3:43
8.	"O Come, All Ye Faithful"	Frederick Oakeley; John Francis Wade	3:47
9.	"Jesu, Joy of Man's Desiring"	Johann Sebastian Bach	4:59
10.	"The Coventry Carol"	Robert Croo	2:54
11.	"We Three Kings of Orient Are"	John Henry Hopkins Jr.	3:37
12.	"Silent Night, Holy Night"	Franz Gruber; Joseph Mohr	2:46
13.	"Gloria in Excelsis Deo" (Plainchant Mode)	Traditional	2:37
14.	"The Homecoming"	John Tesh	3:41
15.	"In a Child's Eyes"	John Tesh	3:47
16.	"The Christmas Song (Chestnuts Roasting on an Open Fire)"	Mel Tormé; Robert Wells	3:31
Total length:			57:02

Track information and credits adapted from the album's liner notes.

== Personnel ==
Musicians

- John Tesh – grand piano
- Paul Viapiano – classical guitar
- Tim Landers – fretless bass (16)
- Joan Elardo – English horn, oboe
- John Reynolds – French horn
- Charlie Bisharat – violin solo (15)
- Vince Denham – saxophone (16)
- Tim Heintz – arrangements (16)

Orchestra section

- Charlie Bisharat – arrangements
- John Bisharat – conductor
- Barbara Nahlik – contractor
- Ed Alton and Dave Stone – bass
- Matthew Cooker, Armen Ksadjikian, Sachi McHenry and Ed Willett – cello
- Katie Kirkpatrick – harp
- Brian Dembow, Karie Prescott, John Scanlon and David Stenske – viola
- Charlie Bisharat, Darius Campo, Juliann French, Berj Garobedian, Peter Kent, Maria Newman, Sid Page, Michele Richards, Anatoly Rosinsky, Bob Sanov, Sheldon Sanov and Roger Wilkie – violin

The Paulist Boy Choristers of California (Tracks 5, 9 & 13)

- Carol Foster – choir director

- Joseph Bertolami
- Matthew Bertolet
- Christian Campos
- Timothy Chew
- Darren Davies
- Hassan Dornayi
- Anthony Fournier
- Cris Garza
- Chris Gough
- Michael Graham
- Andrew Henning
- Gerardo Hernandez
- Eric Hwang
- Jay Johnson
- Tyler Klein
- Theodorus Laksmana
- Matthew Lawrence
- Andrew Lumsden
- Jon McIlinay
- Michael Martner
- Dante Nakazawa
- Dominic O'Connor
- Jesse Ramirez
- Brian Sanchez
- Jordan Ste. Marie
- Ricky Valenzuela
- Hank Wilkes

== Production ==
- Concetta Sellecchia Tesh – executive producer
- John Tesh – executive producer, producer
- Chris Chandler – recording
- Ross Pallone – recording, mixing
- Chris Bellman – mastering at Bernie Grundman Mastering (Hollywood, California)
- Gib Gerard – production assistant
- Vu Tran – art direction
- Charles William Bush – cover photography
- Will McKenzie – make-Up
- Mimi Vodnoy – hair stylist
- Suzie Bagdadi – hair stylist
- Ronny Schiff – research
- Jerry Gross – Scripture selection
- Teri Meredyth – piano technician
- Denxyl Feigelson – management
- Richard Gant – publicity

== Charts ==
Chart (1995)	Peak position
US Billboard 200	50
US Top Holiday Albums (Billboard)	3
US New Age (Billboard)	8
