= Winter Song (John Tesh album) =

Studio album by John Tesh
- Released: 1993
- Studio: "Look at the Lights" Studio; Ocean Way Recording (Hollywood, California).
- Genre: New Age
- Length: 43:03
- Label: GTS Records
- Producer: John Tesh

John Tesh chronology
Monterey Nights (1993)	Winter Song (1993)	A Family Christmas (1994)

Professional ratings
Review scores
Source	Rating
AllMusic	3/5 stars

Winter Song is the ninth album by John Tesh. It was released by GTS Records in 1993.

== Track listing ==
No.	Title	Writer(s)	Length
1.	"Three Generations"	Charlie Bisharat	3:25
2.	"Cabin on the Lake"	John Bisharat	3:13
3.	"3 Seabury Road (Gymnopedie)"	Erik Satie	3:11
4.	"Pineland Farms (Air For The G String)"	Johann Sebastian Bach	2:32
5.	"Angels in the Snow (Prelude To Cello)"	Johann Sebastian Bach	2:33
6.	"Winter Song (Christmas Concerto)"	Arcangelo Corelli	2:55
7.	"Marriage in the Snow"	Charlie Bisharat	3:14
8.	"The Girls of St. Mary's (Intermezzo)"	Andrea Mascagni	3:46
9.	"Dear Unknown"	John Tesh	4:41
10.	"My December Romance (O Mio Babino Caro)"	Giacomo Puccini	3:56
11.	"Goodnight Marie"	John Tesh	3:48
12.	"Warm Winter Nights (Cavatina)"	Stanley Myers	5:49
Total length:			43:03

Track information and credits adapted from the album's liner notes.

== Musicians ==
- John Tesh – grand piano
- Paul Viapiano – guitars
- Tim Landers – electric bass
- Randy Tico – electric bass
- Susan Greenberg – flute
- Joan Elardo – oboe
- Calvin Smith – French horn

String section

- John Bisharat – conductor
- Barbara Nahlik – orchestra manager
- John Patitucci, Dave Stone and Tom Warrington – bass
- Matthew Cooker, Steve Erdody, Sebastian Toettcher, Ed Willett and John Walz – cello
- Katie Kirkpatrick – harp
- Dmitri Boviard, Karie Prescott, Nancy Roth, John Scanlon, Ray Tischer and Herschel Wise – viola
- Charlie Bisharat, Jackie Brand, Darius Campo, Joel Derouin, Charlie Everett, Juliann French, Armen Garabedian, Liane Mautner, Maria Newman, Sid Page, Rachel Robinson, Anatoly Rosinsky, Bob Sanov, David Stenske and Roger Wilkie – violin

== Production ==
- John Tesh – producer
- Chris Chandler – recording
- Ross Pallone – recording, mixing
- Chris Bellman – mastering at Bernie Grundman Mastering (Hollywood, California)
- Gib Gerard – production assistant
- Vu Tran – art direction
- Charles William Bush – back photography
- Reid Wheatley – front photography
- Teri Meredyth – piano technician

== Charts ==
Chart positions for Winter Song
Chart (1995)	Peak position
New Age Albums (Billboard)	8
