= Worship at Red Rocks =

Live album by John Tesh
- Released: August 24, 2004
- Genre: Religious; New Age
- Length: 59:24
- Label: Garden City Music
- Producer: John Tesh

John Tesh chronology
A Deeper Faith, Vol. 2 (2003)	Worship at Red Rocks (2004)	Red Rocks Platinum (2005)

Professional ratings
Review scores
Source	Rating
AllMusic	3.5/5 stars

Worship at Red Rocks is the second live album by John Tesh, released in 2004. The album was recorded live at the Red Rocks Amphitheatre, with the exception of the last two bonus studio tracks.

== Track listing ==
No.	Title	Writer(s)	Length
1.	"You Are Good"	Israel Houghton	7:02
2.	"Above All"	Paul Baloche	5:07
3.	"Breathe"	Stephanie Bentley; Holly Lamar	6:45
4.	"God Is My Rock"	John Tesh	1:57
5.	"Trading My Sorrows"	Darrell Evans	5:49
6.	"Lord Have Mercy"	Steve Merkel	5:23
7.	"Draw Me Close"	Kelly Carpenter	4:54
8.	"Always Forever"	John Tesh; Tim Landers; Gannin Arnold	4:01
9.	"God of Wonders"	Steve Hindalong; Marc Byrd	4:41
10.	"Open the Eyes of My Heart"	Paul Baloche	5:29

Bonus studio tracks
No.	Title	Writer(s)	Length
11.	"Voice of One"	John Tesh; Tim Landers; Gannin Arnold; Christine Miller; Christina Rasch	4:33
12.	"Always Forever"	John Tesh; Tim Landers; Gannin Arnold	3:43
Total length:			59:24

== Personnel ==
- John Tesh – lead vocals, grand piano, synthesizers
- Michael Ruff – keyboards, organ
- Gannin Arnold – acoustic guitar, electric guitars
- Stan Sinclair – acoustic guitar
- Tim Landers – bass guitar, music director
- Neal Wilkinson – drums
- James Sitterly – violin
- Christine Miller – backing vocals
- Christina Rasch – backing vocals

Choir

- Kathleen Benton, Amy Buckner, Galen Burson, Kathryn Dawson, Jude Del Hierro, Paul Dunne, Tom Ewing, Linda Galambos, Gib Gerard, Steve Grant, Rob Haasdyk, Michael Jordon, Jason King, Dave LeMieux, Lesslye Mason, Robin Miller, Esther Pulley, Edna Robinson, Ginny Romine, Diane Rusaw, Angie Sanders, Rhoda Shultz and Nathan Stuart

=== Production ===
- Connie Sellecca – executive producer
- John Tesh – executive producer, producer, mixing
- Christina Rasch – co-producer
- David Habbeger – recording
- Ted Jensen – mastering at Sterling Sound (New York, NY)
- Roswell Jones – production manager, stage manager
- Richard McIntosh – production manager

All track information and credits were taken from the CD liner notes.
