= Live at Red Rocks (John Tesh album) =

Live album by John Tesh
- Released: October 3, 1995
- Venue: Red Rocks Amphitheatre
- Genre: New Age
- Length: 71:04
- Label: GTS Records
- Producer: John Tesh

John Tesh chronology
Sax on the Beach (1995)	Live at Red Rocks (1995)	Discovery (1996)

Professional ratings
Review scores
Source	Rating
Allmusic	4.5/5 stars

Live at Red Rocks is the first live album by John Tesh. Tesh performed with the Colorado Symphony Orchestra at Red Rocks Amphitheatre in Colorado. Rodney Batdorf of AllMusic writes in his review that "Live at Red Rocks is the ultimate John Tesh album, capturing the new age keyboardist at his peak."

== Track listing ==
All tracks are written by John Tesh, unless otherwise noted.

No.	Title	Writer(s)	Length
1.	"Day One"		4:49
2.	"Garden City"	John Tesh; Michael Hanna	4:07
3.	"Key of Love"		4:01
4.	"Barcelona"		5:14
5.	"April Song"		6:26
6.	"Shock"		4:55
7.	"Fields of Gold"	Gordon Sumner	4:10
8.	"A Thousand Summers"	John Tesh; Michael Hanna	4:28
9.	"Against All Odds"	Phil Collins	3:10
10.	"Bastille Day"		4:22
11.	"On American Shores"	John Tesh; Michael Hanna; Victor Frank	4:12
12.	"Concetta"		3:04
13.	"In a Child's Eyes"		3:45
14.	"Group Five"		3:34
15.	"Road Made for Animals"	John Tesh; Michael Hanna	5:12
16.	"PS491"		5:35
Total length:			71:04

== Musicians ==
- John Tesh – Yamaha grand piano, keyboards
- Tom Coster Jr. – synthesizers
- Tim Heintz – synthesizer programming
- Dave Hernandez – sequencing
- Paul Viapiano – acoustic guitar, electric guitar
- Tim Landers – bass
- Dave Hooper – drums
- Brian Kilgore – percussion
- Everette Harp – saxophones
- Stuart Blumberg – principal trumpet
- Charlie Bisharat – electric violin, acoustic violin, music director, additional orchestration
- John Bisharat – orchestra arrangements and conductor
- Johnny Carl – additional orchestration
- Jeffrey Silverman – additional orchestration
- Barbara Nahlik – orchestra contractor
- Colorado Symphony – orchestra

== Production ==
- John Tesh – producer
- Ross Pallone – recording, mixing
- Chris Chandler – assistant engineer, road manager
- Rail Rogut – assistant engineer
- Chris Bellman – mastering at Bernie Grundman Mastering (Hollywood, California)
- Guy Charbonneau/Le Mobile – location recording
- Dirk Schubert – house mixer
- Steve Kallos – monitor technician
- TC Electronic – digital effects
- Charles William Bush – photography
- Hillary Hope – art direction

All track information and credits were taken from the CD liner notes.
