= You Are (Colton Dixon song) =

Single by Colton Dixon

from the album A Messenger
- Released: October 26, 2012
- Genre: Christian pop, Christian rock
- Length: 3:22
- Label: Sparrow
- Songwriters: Colton Dixon, busbee, Rhyan Shirley, Jared Martin
- Producers: Adam Watts; Andy Dodd; Gannin Arnold

Colton Dixon singles chronology
"Never Gone" (2012)	"You Are" (2012)	"Love Has Come for Me" (2013)

"You Are" is the debut single by American Christian rock recording artist Colton Dixon. It was written by Dixon and busbee while the song's production was handled by Sparrow Records and appears on Dixon's debut album as well as his third album in acoustic form. It reached top ten on the Hot Christian Songs and Christian Airplay charts. It also became a number one hit on the Christian Digital Sales chart. His second consecutive number one on that chart.

== Live performance ==
Dixon has performed the song as a special guest on Third Day's 'Miracle Tour' from February 21, 2013, until May 19, 2013.

== Music video ==
An official lyric video was released by Colton's VEVO channel on November 28, 2012.

== Charts ==
Chart performance for "You Are"
Chart (2012–13)	Peak position
US Hot Christian Songs (Billboard)	10
US Christian Airplay (Billboard)	10
US Christian AC (Billboard)	12

== Release history ==
Region	Date	Format
United States	October 26, 2012	Digital download
