= More of You (disambiguation) =

"More of You" is a 2014 song by Colton Dixon.

More of You may also refer to

- "More of You", a song by Chris Stapleton from the 2015 album Traveller
- "More of You", a song by Goo Goo Dolls from the 2013 album Magnetic
- "More of You", a song by Josh Groban from the 2018 album Bridges
- "More of You", a song by Mozella
- "More of You", a song by Pat Boone from the 1981 album Just the Way I Am
- "More of You", a song by Wayne Watson
- More of You, Lord – Praise with Don Moen Volume 2, an album by Don Moen

== See also ==
- "I Need More of You", a song by The Bellamy Brothers
