= Appalachian Duets =

Violin duet composed by Maria Newman

Appalachian Duets, Opus 38, No. 8 (2001), composed by Maria Newman for two violins alone, was co-commissioned by the Travers Violin Duo and the Angeli Duo. It has been performed on a large scale both nationally and internationally. Intended for performance on the concert stage, the musical ideas behind the duets were taken from Maria Newman's original orchestra score for the 1919 Mary Pickford film, Heart o' the Hills.

== String duo ==
- Appalachian Duets, Opus 38, No. 8 (2001) for Two Violins
1. Heart O' the Hills
2. Goin' Fishin
3. The Train
4. Mammy's Little Lullaby
5. Granpap's Fiddle

== Performances ==
William G. McGowen Theater, The National Archives, Washington, DC

The President's Own United States Marine Band
May 1, 2014 at 7:00 p.m.

The Kennedy Center, Washington DC

The President's Own United States Marine Band
August 18, 2014 at 6:00 p.m.
