= Garden City (album) =

Studio album by John Tesh
- Released: August 24, 1989
- Genre: New Age
- Length: 39:58
- Label: Cypress Records
- Producer: Michael Hanna and John Tesh

John Tesh chronology
Tour de France (1988)	Garden City (1989)	A Romantic Christmas (1992)

Professional ratings
Review scores
Source	Rating
Allmusic	3.0/5 stars

Garden City is the third studio album by John Tesh, released by Cypress Records in 1989.

== Track listing ==
All tracks are written by John Tesh, unless otherwise noted.

No.	Title	Writer(s)	Length
1.	"Garden City"	John Tesh; Michael Hanna	4:06
2.	"Shock"		4:25
3.	"Elektrik Thom"		4:59
4.	"Bastille Day"		4:12
5.	"You Break It"	John Tesh; Michael Hanna; Diana DeWitt	4:44
6.	"The Black Hole"		5:57
7.	"Waltz For Julie"		5:22
8.	"Destination Paris"	John Tesh; Michael Hanna	4:41
9.	"Bastille Day (Reprise)"		1:32
Total length:			39:58

== Personnel ==
Musicians

- John Tesh – Synclavier DMS with MACII, Kurzweil K250 and K250 XP, E-mu Emulator II+, E-mu Emulator III, Yamaha TX816, Korg M1 and Sampling Grand, Oberheim DPX-1, Synclavier drums (3)
- Michael Hanna – additional keyboards
- Terrence Elliot – acoustic guitars, electric guitars
- Tim Landers – fretless bass (4, 6, 7, 9), 5-string bass (4, 6, 7, 9)
- George Perilli – drums, percussion
- Vince Denham – sax solo (3, 8)
- Tom Scott – sax solo (5)
- Toots Thielemans – harmonica solo (4, 9)

Vocalists

- Diana DeWitt – lead vocals (5), backing vocals (5, 7)
- Michael McDonald – backing vocals (5)
- Donna McElroy – backing vocals (5, 7)
- Chuck Sabatino – backing vocals (5)
- Chris Chandler, Michael Hanna, Calvin Loser and John Tesh – "shock" voices

== Production ==
- Michael Hanna – producer
- John Tesh – producer, engineer
- Ross Pallone – engineer, mixing
- Calvin Loser – assistant engineer
- Doug Sax – mastering at The Mastering Lab (Hollywood, California)
- Recorded on the Synclavier Digital Music System and Sony 3324 Digital Multitrack.
- Kelly Smith – art direction, design
- Peter Darley Miller – photography

Information for musicians and production taken from liner notes
