= The Calm Before the Storm (Colton Dixon album) =

Studio album by Colton Dixon
- Released: September 11, 2015
- Genre: CCM
- Length: 36:36
- Label: Sparrow, Capitol CMG

Colton Dixon chronology
Anchor (2014)	The Calm Before the Storm (2015)	Identity (2017)

The Calm Before the Storm (also released as two separate EPs entitled Calm and Storm) is the third studio album by Colton Dixon. Sparrow Records alongside Capitol Christian Music Group released the album on September 11, 2015.

== Critical reception ==
Professional ratings
Review scores
Source	Rating
365 Days of Inspiring Media	4/5 stars
CCM Magazine	4/5 stars
The Christian Beat	4.1/5
Cross Rhythms	7/10 squares
HM Magazine	3.5/5 stars
Jesus Freak Hideout	3/5 stars
New Release Today	4/5 stars

Kevin Sparkman from CCM Magazine gave the album four stars and described it as "Together, the collection is a smart collision that provides a soundtrack to fit any mood of the day." Christopher Smith from 'Jesus Freak Hideout gave the album three stars and wrote "The Calm Before The Storm is kind of odd the way it is presented. This project is really two separate EP's, so forcing them together results in a disjointed listen. Ultimately though, this project is a pleasant treat for Colton fans, and worth a spin for just about everyone else." Caitlin Lassiter from New Release Today gave the album four stars and responded "The Calm Before The Storm seems to be the perfect collision of acoustic and remix." Ian Homer from Cross Rhythms gave the album a seven out of ten and replied "One assumes this is written from personal experience and it will undoubtedly chime with many of his fans."

Logan Turner from HM Magazine, gave the album three and a half stars and wrote "These new versions of Dixon’s biggest hits provide a fresh face to his music and are a real treat for his fans." Jonathan Andre from 365 Days of Inspiring Media gave the album four stars and stated "Colton’s songwriting skills way beyond his years, and the ability to transform songs into stripped down acoustic renditions are reasons alone to check out both Calm EP and Storm EP." Lauren McLean from The Christian Beat gave the album 4.1 stars and recognized that "The Calm Before The Storm truly has something for everyone. Justin Sarachik from BreathCast stated "The Calm Before the Storm is a great addition to the collection of fans of Colton Dixon's. While lyrically or on the message side, the listener won't get anything new except "Where I End," musically it is entirely new and offers a fresh perspective. Sometimes artists rework songs and overdo it or make good songs bad. Dixon, did not do this in that case, and in some cases improved the songs. He also does a really good job at driving home the points of "Calm" and "Storm" with each half of the EPs."

== Track listing ==
Track list
No.	Title	Length
1.	"Limitless" (Acoustic)	4:07
2.	"Never Gone" (Acoustic)	4:03
3.	"You Are (Acoustic)" (with Schyler Dixon)	4:22
4.	"Through All of It" (Acoustic)	3:05
5.	"Where I End" (Studio)	4:06
6.	"More of You" (PRO_FITT REMIX)	3:19
7.	"Back to Life" (BLRZ Remix)	2:50
8.	"Echo" (Neon Feather Remix)	3:49
9.	"Dare to Believe" (JSapp Remix)	3:48
10.	"Anchor" (BLRZ Remix)	3:13
Total length:		36:36

== Charts ==
Chart (2015–16)	Peak position
US Christian Albums	44
US Dance/Electronic Albums	11
