= Crimson Jazz Trio =

Jazz trio (2005–2007)

- Origin: Los Angeles, California
- Genre: Jazz fusion
- Years active: 2005–2007
- Past members: Jody Nardone; Tim Landers; Ian Wallace (deceased)

The Crimson Jazz Trio was a jazz trio led by drummer Ian Wallace, formerly of King Crimson, which re-interpreted King Crimson's music.

== History ==
The trio was conceived by Wallace, who recruited Tim Landers (bass) and Jody Nardone (piano) in 2004. They recorded the album King Crimson Songbook, Volume One (Voiceprint) in 2005. The album includes material from beyond Wallace's early 1970s tenure in King Crimson.

Concert appearances in the spring of 2007 were scrapped due to Wallace falling ill. Prior to his death on February 22 of that year, the band finished recording a second album, King Crimson Songbook, Volume Two, with assistance from Jakko Jakszyk and Mel Collins, Wallace's colleagues in 21st Century Schizoid Band. Collins is also a King Crimson alumnus and Jakszyk later joined King Crimson. The album was released on April 7, 2009, on Inner Knot Records.

King Crimson founder Robert Fripp approved of the group, stating: "The CJ3 have respectfully and irreverently taken eight Crimson classics, repositioned them in the musical spectrum, and delivered their first songbook with superb musicianship in service to wit and invention".

== Discography ==
- King Crimson Songbook Volume One (2005)
- King Crimson Songbook Volume Two with Mel Collins (2009)
