= Anchor (Colton Dixon album) =

Studio album by Colton Dixon
- Released: August 19, 2014
- Recorded: 2012
- Studios: Red Decibel Studios (Brea, California); Red Decibel East and House of Blues Studios (Nashville, Tennessee); FabMusic (Franklin, Tennessee)
- Genres: CCM, Christian rock
- Length: 47:26
- Labels: Sparrow, 19
- Producers: David Garcia; Red Decibel (Adam Watts, Andy Dodd and Gannin Arnold)

Colton Dixon chronology
A Messenger (2013)	Anchor (2014)	The Calm Before the Storm (2015)

Singles from Anchor
- 1. "More of You" Released: June 24, 2014; 2. "Through All of It" Released: March 2015; 3. "Limitless" Released: November 2015

Anchor is the second studio album from eleventh season American Idol contestant, Colton Dixon. The album was released on August 19, 2014, by Sparrow Records and debuted at No. 23 on the Billboard 200.

== Background ==
For this album, Colton Dixon wrote songs with TobyMac and Matthew West, in addition to his regular collaborators David Garcia, Ben Glover, Adam Watts, Andy Dodd and Gannin Arnold. He wrote "Our Time Is Now" with TobyMac before touring with him as part of the Winter Jam tour in early 2014, but finished the song afterwards. The song "More of You" was the last song recorded for the album, and it was released as the lead single on June 24, 2014.

According to Dixon, the title of the song "Anchor" came from a need for anchor as the foundation of life because at times he felt he was drifting. The idea behind the song then turned into this theme-based record.

== Promotion ==
Dixon's image will appear on millions of Mountain Dew cans distributed by the Pepsi company at Wal-Mart. The cans will also come with a free download from the album.

== Reception ==
Professional ratings
Review scores
Source	Rating
365 Days of Inspiring Media	4/5 stars
CCM Magazine	4/5 stars
Christian Music Review	4.5/5
Christian Review Magazine	5/5 stars
Cross Rhythms	8/10 squares
Jesus Freak Hideout	3.5/5 stars
Jesus Wired	8/10 stars
New Release Tuesday	4.5/5 stars
PPCORN	3.9 stars on a 5 point scale
Worship Leader	3.5/5 stars

=== Critical ===
Indicating in a four star review by CCM Magazine, Andy Argyrakis calls the music simply, "extraordinary". Matthew Cordle, in an eight out of ten review from Cross Rhythms, realizing, "While there are a couple of weaker, less inspiring moments and there could have been a little more sonic variety, most of the songs here are uplifting and thought-provoking." Signaling in a four and a half star review from New Release Tuesday, Caitlin Lassiter recognizing, "Anchor surpasses expectations and shows off Colton's talent in new ways. For such a young artist, an album of this caliber is truly amazing." In rating the album three and a half stars Wayne Myatt for Jesus Freak Hideout, referencing, "much credit is given to Colton Dixon for taking a different approach with this project and trying something more diverse; this is a welcome pop rock release in 2014." Jonathan Andre, awarding the album four stars at 365 Days of Inspiring Media, says, "Well done Colton for such an empowering, encouraging and enjoyable album". Rating the album a 4.5 out of five for Christian Music Review, Amanda Brogan writes, "Colton Dixon calls us to join him in walking with Christ amidst the storm." Writing a review for Christian Review Magazine, Leah St. John rating the album five stars states, "All of the tracks on Anchor are excellent, and I could find no fault with any of them." Rebekah Joy, giving the album eight stars at Jesus Wired, describes, "Anchor is a timeless, phenomenal album that will inspire listeners to live their lives for Christ, and encourage them on tough days." Awarding the album a 3.9 out of five star review from PPCORN, Jessica Morris reports, "Anchor will grow on you with each subsequent listen."

=== Commercial ===
The album debuted on Billboard 200 at No. 23 with 9,688 copies sold on its debut week. It was also No. 1 on four other charts - Christian/Gospel Album, Digital charts, ChristianRock/Alternative Album chart, and Contemporary Christian Album chart. The album has sold 28,000 copies as of September 2015.

== Track listing ==
Album release
No.	Title	Writer(s)	Length
1.	"S.O.S."	Colton Dixon, Toby McKeehan, David Arthur Garcia	1:01
2.	"Our Time Is Now"	Dixon, McKeehan & Garcia	3:41
3.	"Walk on the Waves"	Dixon, Ben Glover, Cary Barlowe	4:17
4.	"Anchor"	Dixon, Matt Bronleewe, Tony Wood	3:30
5.	"Echo"	Dixon, Trevor McNevan	3:51
6.	"35.8438, -86.4518"	Dixon, Glover	0:24
7.	"More of You"	Dixon, Glover, Garcia	4:06
8.	"Loud and Clear"	Dixon, Andy Dodd, Adam Watts, Gannin Arnold	4:29
9.	"Fool's Gold"	Dixon, Iain Kirkpatrick, Simon Wilcox	3:29
10.	"Dare to Believe"	Dixon, Glover, Garcia	3:50
11.	"Through All of It"	Glover, Molly Reed	3:25
12.	"Limitless"	Dixon, Garcia, Matthew West	3:55
13.	"Back to Life"	Dixon, Glover, Garcia	3:37
14.	"This Isn't The End"	Dixon, Dodd, Watts, Arnold	3:44

== Personnel ==
- Colton Dixon – all vocals (2–5, 7, 9–14), acoustic piano (3, 4, 11, 14), additional programming (3, 4, 14), keyboards (7, 10, 12, 13), lead vocals (8), backing vocals (8), additional synthesizers (8), programming (10, 12, 13), human percussion (14)
- Fred Williams – programming (1, 6, 10), keyboards (7, 10)
- David Garcia – keyboards (2, 5, 7, 10, 12, 13), programming (2, 5, 7, 9, 10, 12, 12), bass (2, 5, 7, 12, 13), guitars (7, 9, 10, 12, 13)
- Andy Dodd – programming (3, 4, 14), guitars (3, 4, 14)
- Gannin Arnold – synthesizers (3, 4, 8, 14), guitars (3, 4, 8, 14), bass (3, 4, 8, 14)
- Matt Bronleewe – additional programming (4)
- Chris Lacorte – guitars (2, 5, 9, 10, 12, 13)
- Cary Barlowe – additional guitars (3)
- Mike Payne – guitars (9, 12, 13)
- Pete Stewart – guitars (9)
- Tony Lucido – bass (9, 10)
- Adam Watts – drums (2–5, 8, 14), programming (3, 4, 8, 14), backing vocals (8), percussion (14)
- Nir Z – drums (7, 9)
- Ben Phillips – drums (10)

Strings on "Through All of It"

- David Davidson – arrangements
- David Angell, Monisa Angell, John Catchings, We Tsun Chang, David Davidson, Anthony LaMarchina, Bobby Shin and Kristin Wilkinson – string players

== Production ==
- Brad O'Donnell – A&R
- David Garcia – producer (1, 2, 5–7, 9–13), engineer (1, 2, 6, 10–13), mixing (1, 2, 5, 6, 9, 13)
- Red Decibel – producers (3, 4, 8, 14)
- Andy Dodd – engineer (3, 4, 8, 14), mixing (11)
- Adam Watts – engineer (3, 4, 8, 14), mixing (3, 4, 8, 14)
- Serban Ghenea – mixing (7)
- John Hanes – mix engineer (7)
- Neal Avron – mixing (10)
- Chris Wilkenson – engineer (11)
- Mark Needham – mixing (12)
- Paul Rossetti – mix assistant (2, 5, 9, 13), editing (2, 9, 12, 13)
- Ben Glover – additional guitar recording (3)
- Ben O'Neill – assistant mix engineer (12)
- Joe LaPorta – mastering (1–6, 8, 9, 11–14)
- Tom Coyne – mastering (7)
- Ted Jensen – mastering (10)
- Sterling Sound (New York, NY) – mastering location
- Vinnie Alibrandi – album assemblage
- Sarah Sung – art direction, design
- William Garrison – anchor logo
- David Molnar – cover image, photography
- Tricia Baumhardt – stylist

== Charts ==
Chart performance for Anchor
Chart (2014)	Peak position
US Billboard 200	23
US Top Christian Albums (Billboard)	1

== Release history ==
Region	Date	Label
Canada	August 19, 2014	Sparrow Records, 19 Recordings
United Kingdom	August 19, 2014	Universal Music
United States	August 19, 2014	Sparrow Records, 19 Recordings
