= A Messenger =

Studio album by Colton Dixon
- Released: January 29, 2013
- Recorded: 2012
- Studios: Red Decibel Studios (Los Angeles, California); Red Decibel East (Nashville, Tennessee); FabMusic (Franklin, Tennessee)
- Genres: Contemporary Christian music; rock
- Length: 41:25 (Standard); 1:06:33 (Expanded edition)
- Labels: Sparrow; 19
- Producers: Adam Watts; Andy Dodd; Gannin Arnold; David Garcia

Colton Dixon chronology
A Messenger (2013)	Anchor (2014)

Singles from A Messenger
- 1. "Never Gone" Released: September 25, 2012; 2. "You Are" Released: October 26, 2012; 3. "Love Has Come for Me" Released: 2013

A Messenger is the debut album from eleventh season American Idol contestant, Colton Dixon. The album was released on January 29, 2013, by Sparrow Records and debuted at No. 15 on the Billboard 200. It debuted at number one on the Top Christian Albums chart.

== Background ==
After being eliminated from Idol, Dixon said he wanted to make a "faith-based album" without alienating a wider audience for his debut. Dixon signed to Sparrow Records in September 2012 and released his first single later that month. Dixon said his biggest was "trying to choose 11, 12 songs for the record out of the 50 or so that I wrote, but it came together so well."

Dixon contributed to all of the songs except for "Let Them See You", saying "I heard this song from a friend of mine and I just had to have it on my record. It finished the record perfectly!"

The majority of "A Messenger" was produced and mixed by Red Decibel (Adam Watts, Andy Dodd and Gannin Arnold).

== Promotion ==
On February 14, 2013, Dixon opened up for fellow American Idol season eleven alum, Jessica Sanchez in Manila. Dixon then performed as a special guest supporting Third Day as part of The Miracle Tour.

== Singles ==
Two singles were released before the album's release. The first single, "Never Gone", was released on September 25, 2012. Dixon says that the song "sums up my American Idol experience. There were times when I felt like I was by myself, or just felt unplugged from reality. There were even times when I asked God if He was still there...He always answered 'I was never gone.'" The song sold 28,000 copies in its first month. It reached number one on the Christian Digital Sales chart.

The second single, "You Are", was released on October 26, 2012, and peaked at No. 10 on the US Hot Christian Songs chart. It peaked at number ten on Christian Airplay chart and became his second consecutive number one on the Christian Digital Sales chart. By the end of the year, 47,000 copies were sold.

After the album's release, Dixon released "Love Has Come for Me" as the third single. It reached 28 on the Christian Digital Sales chart. He performed the song on the twelfth season Top 8 results on American Idol. The lyric video was released by VEVO on March 27, 2013.

== Track listing ==
Standard edition
No.	Title	Writer(s)	Length
1.	"Intro"	Colton Dixon	0:47
2.	"Noise"	Dixon; busbee	3:04
3.	"I'll Be the Light"	Dixon; Zac Maloy	3:25
4.	"You Are"	Dixon; busbee; Jared Martin; Rhyan Shirley	3:22
5.	"Never Gone"	Dixon; Andy Dodd; Adam Watts; Gannin Arnold	3:34
6.	"Love Has Come for Me"	Dixon; Ben Glover; Christopher Stevens	3:19
7.	"Scars"	Dixon; Rob Hawkins	4:50
8.	"Rise"	Dixon; Kevin Griffin	3:21
9.	"Where My Heart Goes"	Dixon; David Garcia; Glover	3:39
10.	"This Is Who I Am"	Dixon; Dave Bassett	3:43
11.	"In and Out of Time"	Dixon; Watts; Dodd; Arnold	4:06
12.	"Let Them See You"	Scotty Wilbanks; JJ Weeks	4:16

iTunes Store bonus track
No.	Title	Writer(s)	Length
13.	"Wake Up"	Dixon; Stevens	3:44

Walmart bonus track
No.	Title	Writer(s)	Length
13.	"The Shape of Your Love"	Dixon; Adam Watts; Dodd; Arnold	3:48

Expanded edition
No.	Title	Length
13.	"Never Gone" (Capital Kings Remix)	4:31
14.	"Love Has Come for Me" (fabmusic Remix)	3:44
15.	"In and Out of Time" (PHENOMENOM Remix)	5:28
16.	"You Are" (David Thulin Remix)	3:46
17.	"The Shape of Your Love"	3:50
18.	"Wake Up"	3:44

== Personnel ==
- Colton Dixon – all vocals, acoustic piano, keyboards, programming
- Andy Dodd – programming, guitars
- Gannin Arnold – programming, guitars, bass
- Adam Watts – programming, guitars, drums
- Rob Hawkins – programming
- David Garcia – keyboards, programming, guitars, bass
- Christopher Stevens – keyboards, programming
- Chris Lacorte – guitars
- Mike Payne – guitars
- Ben Phillips – drums
- John Catchings – cello
- Richard Dodd – cello
- Lauren Chipman – viola
- Daphne Chen – violin
- Eric Gorfain – violin
- David Davidson – string arrangements
- Bob Barrett – orchestration
- Scotty Wilbanks – arrangements (12)

=== Production ===
- Brad O'Donnell – A&R
- Andy Dodd – producer (1–7, 10–17), engineer (1–7, 10–17), mixing (1–5, 8, 11–13, 16, 17), mastering
- Adam Watts – producer (1–7, 10–17), engineer (1–7, 10–17), mixing (1–7, 10–17), mastering
- Gannin Arnold – producer (1–7, 10–17)
- David Garcia – producer (8, 9, 18), engineer (8, 9)
- Christopher Stevens – producer (18)
- Jerricho Scroggins – engineer (8, 9), editing (8, 9)
- Chris Lord-Alge – mixing (9)
- David Hall – piano engineer
- Capital Kings – remixing (13)
- David Thulin – remixing (16)
- Jess Chambers – A&R administration
- Jan Cook – art direction
- Sarah Sung – design packaging
- David Molnar – cover photography
- David Bean – additional photography
- Lane Newland and Jim Weatherson for 19 Entertainment – management

== Critical reception ==
Professional ratings
Review scores
Source	Rating
CCM Magazine	4/5 stars
Christian Music Review	4.9/5
Christian Music Zine	5.01/5
Indie Vision Music	3/5 stars
Jesus Freak Hideout	3.5/5 stars
Music Perk	8/10 stars
New H2O	4/5 stars
New Release Tuesday	4/5 stars

A Messenger has received positive reviews from music critics. At CCM Magazine, Andy Argyrakis felt that Dixon "not only excels vocally, but turns in a vibrantly produced pop/rock statement on finding purpose and being a light in the darkness", and noted that the album has "an appropriate title that showcases his lifelong faith." Laura Chambers of Christian Music Review told that "the message Colton Dixon carries comes through loud and clear." Christian Music Zine's Jared Conaster wrote that "this CD is his breaking out, his introduction into the world of Christian music that will last a long, long time", and that "Colton came out of the gate hitting a grand slam." Michelle Amabile Angermiller of The Hollywood Reporter gave the album a positive review, saying "Dixon's release displays plenty of the Christian rocker's emotional vocals and energetic piano punctuated by positive lyrics, and most importantly, his message of hope. It's a comforting debut bringing light into an increasingly dark world." Royal.T of New H2O told that the release "has delivered a very solid effort that exceeded many expectations that he set on the show."

Jonathan Andre of Indie Vision Music felt that "with poetic melodies and songwriting skills beyond his years, Colton’s Sparrow Records debut is bound to receive both praise and backlash in both musical industries", however he said that "well done Colton for such an enjoyable and encouraging album!" At Jesus Freak Hideout, Cortney Warner questioned with writing that "Will it be put down in the books as the best and brightest debut for a new artist? Probably not, but this record should appease his fans from Idol as well as enthusiasts of mainstream CCM music", but "A Messenger remains a solid effort." Asok Abhijith of Music Perk wrote that the release was "awesome", and that it is the "best possible career launcher by Dixon". At New Release Tuesday, Kevin Davis felt that "these songs will certainly connect with radio listeners and showcase the multi-talented singer/songwriter's trademark balance with vocal tenderness and intensity, his energetic piano playing and, above all, a sense of hope and inspiration", and he alluded to how "this album encourages listeners to be a messenger."

== Chart performance ==
In its first week of sales, A Messenger sold 22,000 copies and debuted at No. 15 on the Billboard 200. It also debuted at No. 1 on the US Christian Charts and US Gospel Charts. As of May 2013, the album has sold 100,000 copies in the US.

== Chart and certifications ==
=== Weekly charts ===
Chart (2013)	Peak position
US Billboard 200	15
US Christian Albums (Billboard)	1
US Digital Albums (Billboard)	9

=== Year-end charts ===
Chart (2013)	Peak position
US Christian Albums (Billboard)	9

Chart (2014)	Peak position
US Christian Albums (Billboard)	38

== Release history ==
List of release dates, showing region, label, format and edition(s)
Region	Date	Format(s)	Label
United States	January 29, 2013	CD, digital download	Sparrow Records, 19 Recordings
