= Never Gone (Colton Dixon song) =

Promotional single by Colton Dixon

from the album A Messenger
- Released: September 25, 2012
- Genre: Christian rock
- Length: 3:34
- Label: Sparrow
- Songwriters: Colton Dixon, Adam Watts, Andy Dodd, Gannin Arnold
- Producers: Adam Watts, Andy Dodd, Gannin Arnold

"Never Gone" is a song recorded by American recording artist Colton Dixon, who placed seventh on the eleventh season of American Idol. It was released September 25, 2012 as the first promotional single from his debut studio album, A Messenger (2013).

== Background ==
After placing seventh on Idol, Colton went on the American Idols Live! Tour 2012 over the summer with the other contestants. He co-wrote the song "Never Gone," (with the production team composed of Andy Dodd, Adam Watts and Gannin Arnold who also produced the track) and performed it at the concerts he played in.

He would soon be signed to Sparrow Records and release his material through the label. The singer confirms debut single entitled "You Are" to impact U.S. radio on October 19, and the song "Never Gone" was released to iTunes in the U.S. on September 25, 2012.

Colton says that the song "sums up my American Idol experience. There were times when I felt like I was by myself, or just felt unplugged from reality. There were even times when I asked God if He was still there...He always answered "I was never gone.""

== Covers ==
On the twelfth season of American Idol, Angie Miller performed this song during the semi-finals on March 5, 2013.

Since Angie Miller performed it on Idol, Dixon decided to have a "Never Gone" cover contest, where his band will pick the three best videos and will get prizes from the Colton Dixon store.

== Commercial performance ==
"Never Gone" entered the Christian Digital Songs and Christian/Gospel Digital Songs at No. 1 in both charts. It reached 24 on the Hot Christian Songs chart. The music video has over four million views on YouTube.

== Charts ==
=== Weekly charts ===
Weekly chart performance for "Never Gone"
Chart (2013–2014)	Peak position
UK Christian Airplay (Cross Rhythms)	3
US Hot Christian Songs (Billboard)	24

== Release history ==
Region	Date	Format
United States	September 25, 2012	Digital download
