= Sgt. Bilko =

1996 American comedy film directed by Jonathan Lynn

- Theatrical release poster
- Directed by: Jonathan Lynn
- Written by: Andy Breckman
- Based on: The Phil Silvers Show by Nat Hiken
- Produced by: Brian Grazer
- Starring: Steve Martin; Dan Aykroyd; Phil Hartman; Glenne Headly
- Cinematography: Peter Sova
- Edited by: Tony Lombardo
- Music by: Alan Silvestri
- Production company: Imagine Entertainment
- Distributed by: Universal Pictures
- Release date: March 29, 1996
- Running time: 94 minutes
- Country: United States
- Language: English
- Budget: $39 million
- Box office: $37,956,793

Sgt. Bilko is a 1996 American military comedy film directed by Jonathan Lynn and written by Andy Breckman. It is an adaptation of the 1950s television series The Phil Silvers Show, often informally called Sgt. Bilko, or simply Bilko, and stars Steve Martin, Dan Aykroyd, Phil Hartman and Glenne Headly.

Sgt. Bilko was released by Universal Pictures on March 29, 1996. The film received mixed reviews from critics and grossed $37,956,793 against a $39 million budget.

== Plot ==
Master Sergeant Ernest G. Bilko is in charge of the motor pool at Fort Baxter, a small United States Army base that develops new military technology. Exploiting this position, he directs a number of scams, ranging from gambling to renting out military vehicles. His commanding officer, Colonel John Hall, overlooks these money-making schemes, as he is more concerned with problems in the "Hover Tank" that the base is designing.

Major Colin Thorn, an officer from the U.S. Army Inspector General's office, arrives at the camp determined to get revenge on Bilko to settle an old score the two have from Fort Dix, where Thorn was nearly court-martialed after Bilko’s attempt to fix a boxing match resulted in Thorn being shipped off to Greenland in the belief that he tried to fix the fight.

Thorn attempts to steal Bilko's long-time fiancée Rita, whom Bilko has stood up at the altar more than a dozen times. Rita gives Bilko 30 days to win her back or lose her for good.

Bilko, with the help of newly assigned Private First Class Wally Holbrook, devises a means of avoiding Thorn's attempt to transfer him to Greenland: He gets Thorn to think the Hover Tank works, then rigs a demonstration of it staged before a general and government officials, after Thorn had tried to sabotage the tank the previous night. As a result, Thorn confronts Bilko, Hall, and the general, insulting Bilko and Hall, until he unwittingly confesses to sabotaging the Hover Tank. Thorn is sent off again to Greenland.

The last day of Rita's ultimatum has come. Just as she begins to write Bilko off forever, she hears men outside her house, serenading her with a favorite song of hers and Bilko's. Looking out, she sees Bilko and his platoon. Bilko asks Rita to marry him, and she accepts. The next day is their wedding day, but Rita shows up late, due to a mix-up over Daylight Saving Time. After they play another card game (if Bilko wins, they get married), they finally get married. Unknown to Bilko, Rita is holding four aces in her hand.

== Cast ==
- Steve Martin as Master Sergeant Ernest G. Bilko
- Dan Aykroyd as Colonel John T. Hall
- Phil Hartman as Major Colin Thorn
- Glenne Headly as Rita Robbins
- Daryl Mitchell as Private First Class Walter "Wally" T. Holbrook
- Austin Pendleton as Major Ebersole
- Max Casella as Specialist Dino Paparelli
- Eric Edwards as Private Duane Doberman
- Dan Ferro as Specialist Tony Morales
- John Marshall Jones as Sergeant Henshaw
- Brian Leckner as Private First Class Sam Fender
- John Ortiz as Specialist Luis Clemente
- Pamela Segall as Sergeant Raquel Barbella
- Mitchell Whitfield as Private First Class Mickey Zimmerman
- Debra Jo Rupp as Mrs. Hall
- Richard Herd as General Tennyson
- Steve Kehela as Master Sergeant Stan Sowicki
- Steve Park as Captain Moon
- Chris Rock as First Lieutenant Oster
- Catherine Silvers as First Lieutenant Monday
- Dale Dye as First Engineer
- Travis Tritt as Himself

== Production ==
In April 1993, it was announced Imagine Entertainment had begun development on an adaptation of The Phil Silvers Show to be titled Sgt. Bilko. By December 1994, it was reported Steve Martin would star as the titular Sgt. Bilko, Dan Aykroyd would co-star as Col. Hall, and Phil Hartman would play Maj Colin Thorne, an officer with a grudge against Bilko. Albert Brooks was offered the role of Ernest G. Bilko, but turned it down. Universal Pictures, Imagine, and the cast were reportedly interested in turning Sgt. Bilko into a franchise.

== Reception ==
On the film-critic aggregator Rotten Tomatoes, Sgt. Bilko received a 30% positive ratings from 40 reviews, with an average rating of 4.6/10. On Metacritic, it has a score of 47 out of 100 based on reviews from 23 critics, indicating "mixed or average reviews".

Gene Siskel and Roger Ebert gave it two thumbs up on their television show. In his column in The Chicago Sun-Times, Ebert praised Steve Martin's performance and enjoyed "all the little jokes hidden in the corners" of the movie. Audiences surveyed by CinemaScore gave the film a grade of "B+" on a scale of A+ to F. It won the award for Worst Resurrection of a TV Show at the 1996 Stinkers Bad Movie Awards. It also failed at the box office.
