= Dan Ferro =

American actor

- Born: October 10, 1960; New Britain, Connecticut
- Died: August 19, 2022 (aged 61); New Britain, Connecticut
- Occupation(s): Television actor Film actor
- Years active: 1988–2001
- Known for: Falcon Crest; Death Wish 4: The Crackdown

Gilbert Daniel Ferro (October 10, 1960 – August 19, 2022) was an American actor, best known for his role as Tommy Ortega in the 1980s television series Falcon Crest and for his role as drug lord Tony Romero in Death Wish 4: The Crackdown. Among his other works, he played an inept narcissistic soldier in 1996's Sgt. Bilko, and later appeared in the 2001 film Blow.

== Filmography ==
=== Film ===
Year	Title	Role	Notes
1982	Creepshow		
1987	Death Wish 4: The Crackdown	Tony Romero	
1996	Sgt. Bilko	Spc. Tony Morales	
2001	Blow	Cesar Toban	

=== Television ===
Year	Title	Role	Notes
1988	Almost Grown	Angelo Malatesta	1 episode
1988-1989	Falcon Crest	Tommy Ortega	18 episodes
1990	Over My Dead Body	Tony Rialdo	1 episode
1993	Bonkers	T.J. Finger	Voice, 1 episode
1993-1994	Murder, She Wrote	Raymond Fernandez / Roy Phipps	2 episodes
1995	Charlie Grace	Eric	1 episode
1996	Gargoyles: The Goliath Chronicles	Gang Banger #1 / Goon #2	Voice, 1 episode
1999	Brother's Keeper	Gino	2 episode
2000	The Pretender	Giuseppe	1 episode
2001	V.I.P.		1 episode
