= Death Wish 4: The Crackdown =

1987 American action thriller film by J. Lee Thompson

- Theatrical release poster
- Directed by: J. Lee Thompson
- Screenplay by: Gail Morgan Hickman
- Based on: Characters by Brian Garfield
- Produced by: Pancho Kohner
- Starring: Charles Bronson; Kay Lenz; John P. Ryan; Perry Lopez; Soon-Tek Oh; George Dickerson
- Cinematography: Gideon Porath
- Edited by: Peter Lee-Thompson
- Music by: John Bisharat; Paul McCallum; Valentine McCallum
- Production company: The Cannon Group, Inc.
- Distributed by: Cannon Film Distributors
- Release date: November 6, 1987 (U.S.)
- Running time: 99 minutes
- Country: United States
- Language: English
- Budget: $5 million
- Box office: $6.9 million

Death Wish 4: The Crackdown is a 1987 American vigilante action-thriller film, a sequel to the 1985 film Death Wish 3 and the fourth installment in the Death Wish film series. The film was directed by J. Lee Thompson, and features Charles Bronson, who reprises his leading role as Paul Kersey. In the film, Kersey is once again forced to become a vigilante after his girlfriend Karen Sheldon's daughter Erica dies of a drug overdose. He is recruited by a tabloid owner, Nathan White (John P. Ryan), to take down various crime figures of the Los Angeles drug trade.

Michael Winner, who directed the first three films in the series, was replaced by J. Lee Thompson. Death Wish 4: The Crackdown had a substantially lower budget and a more limited release than its predecessors. It was released in North America on November 6, 1987. The Bollywood film Mohra is an unofficial remake of the film. The film marks the seventh collaboration between Bronson and director J. Lee Thompson, following 1976's St. Ives, 1977's The White Buffalo, 1980's Caboblanco, 1983's 10 to Midnight, 1984's The Evil That Men Do, and 1986's Murphy's Law.

== Plot ==
Roughly a year after the events of the previous film, Paul Kersey is back in Los Angeles living a quiet life as an architect at his own firm, haunted by nightmares of his vigilante past. Erica Sheldon, the teenage daughter of Paul's girlfriend Karen, goes with her boyfriend, Randy Viscovich, to an arcade. A man named JoJo Ross offers her crack cocaine, and Erica dies from an overdose. Having seen Erica smoke a joint with Randy in his car, Paul suspects Randy was involved with Erica's death, so he follows him back to the arcade. Randy is killed in a confrontation with JoJo, and Paul fatally shoots JoJo in turn.

Paul receives an anonymous package from someone claiming to know he is "the vigilante." An anonymous phone caller threatens to go to the police if Paul won't meet. He is taken to the mansion of the secretive tabloid publisher Nathan White who says his daughter became addicted to drugs and died of an overdose. He wants Paul to wipe out the drug trade in Los Angeles, where two major gangs compete for the local drug supply, one led by Ed Zacharias, the other by brothers Jack and Tony Romero.

Paul infiltrates Zacharias's manor as a party bartender and bugs the phone. He is captured after witnessing Zacharias murder a colleague, Vincent Montono. Paul kills henchman Al Arroyo before he can kill Paul, and escapes. Paul kills three of Zacharias's enforcers with a bomb in a wine bottle at a restaurant, then drug dealer Max Green in a video shop, and Romeros' top hitman Frank Bauggs at a high-rise condominium. LAPD detectives Sid Reiner and Phil Nozaki, are investigating the arcade deaths. Nozaki spots Paul's license plate as he flees the condominium, but doesn't share the info with his partner.

White sends Paul to a San Pedro wharf acting as a front for Zacharias's drug operations. Paul kills the dealers and blows up the drug processing room with a time bomb. Nozaki confronts Paul at work, reveals himself to be a corrupt cop working for Zacharias, and demands to know who Paul works for. He lures Zacharias and the Romero brothers into a trap, leading to a shootout in which both cartels are completely destroyed and Zacharias is personally killed by Paul.

White congratulates Paul. However, when Paul narrowly escapes a car bomb, he returns to the White Manor to find a stranger claiming to be the real Nathan White. The impersonator who hired Paul was actually Ferrari, a third drug lord who used him to dispose of the rival cartels. Paul is arrested, recognizes the two policemen to be fakes, causes their car to flip, and flees.

Ferrari kidnaps Karen as bait to draw Paul out. Paul catches Reiner inside his apartment, bent on avenging Nozaki's death, and knocks him out. Armed with a rifle grenade launcher, Paul goes to meet Ferrari at the parking lot of White's commercial building. After killing many of his men, Paul follows Ferrari into a roller rink and kills the rest of his gang, before confronting him and Karen on the roof. Karen breaks but Ferrari kills her, and Paul fires his last grenade at him. Reiner arrives and orders him to surrender. When Paul walks away proclaiming "do whatever you have to," Reiner lets him go.

== Cast ==
- Charles Bronson as Paul Kersey
- Kay Lenz as Karen Sheldon
- John P. Ryan as Nathan White/Ferrari
- Perry Lopez as Ed Zacharias
- Mike Moroff as Jack Romero
- Dan Ferro as Tony Romero
- George Dickerson as Detective Sid Reiner
- Soon-Tek Oh as Detective Phil Nozaki
- Gerald Castillo as Lieutenant Higuera
- Dana Barron as Erica Sheldon
- Jesse Dabson as Randy Viscovich
- Danny Trejo as Art Sanella
- Daniel Sabia as Al Arroyo
- Michael Russo as Danny Moreno
- James Purcell as Vincent Montono
- Peter Sherayko as Nick Franco
- David Fonteno as Frank Bauggs
- Tom Everett as Max Green
- Hector Mercado as Joe "Jo-Jo" Ross
- Tim Russ as Jesse
- Mark Pellegrino as Punk
- Mitch Pileggi as Cannery Lab Foreman
- Irwin Keyes as Joey
- Richard Aherne as Nathan White

== Production ==
=== Development ===
Cannon Films announced the creation of a new sequel to Death Wish in 1986, estimating that it would be ready for release by spring 1987. Although, the film company was by this point facing financial problems. Its greatest box office hit was still Missing in Action (1984) with $38 million domestic gross. Cannon had lost money through box office flops such as Pirates (1986). Consequently, they tightened the budgets of upcoming films to under $5 million per film. When it came to a screenplay for the film, there were several available. Writing duties were ultimately assigned to Gail Morgan Hickman, who had previously contributed rejected scripts for Death Wish 3 (1985).

Hickman's first script, which had Paul Kersey (Charles Bronson) struggling with a crisis of conscience and trying to reconnect with Geri Nichols (Jill Ireland) from Death Wish II, was rejected because Ireland was battling breast cancer. The second script, which had Paul going after an international terrorist, was rejected due to its premise having similarities to Wanted: Dead or Alive (1987). The final script had the premise of Paul playing two gangs against each other. Hickman was influenced by the use of this premise in the films Yojimbo (1961) and A Fistful of Dollars (1964).

Hickman also came up with the idea of a millionaire benefactor for Paul, with both of them having lost a daughter, surrogate in Paul's case, to the deadly effects of the illegal drug trade. Kohner found this an interesting idea in need of a plot twist. Hickman came up with the idea of the millionaire being a drug lord who is using Paul to eliminate his competition. According to Hickman, he understood that Cannon producers Menahem Golan and Yoram Globus "wanted a mindless movie with nonstop action", so he came up with "cartoonish" action scenes.

Hickman revised his screenplay from February to March 1987, during which time he wrote from 9 a.m. to 9 p.m. on a daily basis. Hickman toyed with the idea of giving Paul a surrogate son named Eric Sheldon, to avoid repetition in having the character lose another daughter. He changed his mind and turned Eric into Erica, because he felt that the death of a girl would be a stronger echo to the original loss in Paul's life. Hickman was also the father of a daughter and could better understand the agony of losing a girl.

During filming, Bronson requested further rewrites of certain elements of dialogue and action scenes. Hickman recalled going through several rewrites on a daily basis. An earlier draft had Paul living in Los Angeles with a new girlfriend. She was subsequently murdered by crooks. Paul, fighting the urge to return to his vigilante ways, captures the crooks and hands them over to the police. When the crooks walk on a technicality, Paul becomes the vigilante once more, and hunts them down, one by one. Cannon felt this take on the series was too cerebral and didn't feature enough action. Ultimately, a more conventional storyline was chosen.

=== Casting ===
For Death Wish 4, Cannon reached an agreement with an independent producer, Pancho Kohner, son of Paul Kohner. The senior Kohner was the agent of Charles Bronson. Pancho had produced, or co-produced, seven previous Bronson films, including St. Ives (1976), The White Buffalo (1977), Love and Bullets (1979), 10 to Midnight (1983), The Evil That Men Do (1984), Murphy's Law (1986), and Assassination (1987). Death Wish 4 was the first film in the series not to be directed by Michael Winner, who was occupied filming Appointment with Death (1988). Winner expressed no interest in directing Death Wish 4 because Bronson was displeased with their previous collaboration on Death Wish 3.

Both Bronson and Kohner had in mind assigning directorial duties to J. Lee Thompson, who had worked with them in several previous films, and had a good working relationship with the producers of Cannon Films. Bronson was offered 4 million dollars to reprise his role, more than a half of the film's entire budget. The temperamental star voiced his displeasure frequently to the writer, Gail Morgan Hickman during the production of Death Wish 4. "Charlie was a guy who could be impulsive and unpredictable," Hickman says. "Every day, we would show up on the set and Charlie would apart what he was to shoot. He would say, 'This sucks.' We would quickly go over the morning shoot. You couldn't [change] that much, because they were ready to shoot, but we would make some reparations to the dialogue. Then, in between takes, we would go over the pages for the afternoon shoot and Charlie would say, 'This sucks'; 'This is stupid'; 'I don't like this'; 'I hate this line here'; 'Why can't he say this".

The villain Nathan White was played by John P. Ryan. Golan hired him after loving his work in Runaway Train (1985) and Ryan stated that he also loved working with "the Cannon duo". Erica's actor, Dana Barron said that "The cast was amazing. Everyone was happy to be there. We felt like we were continuing the [Death Wish] legacy".

=== Filming ===
The previous three films of the series featured youthful street punks as villains. The fourth covered new ground featuring adult representatives of organized crime. Principal photography was originally scheduled to begin in January 1987. The start was delayed for March 1987, and was delayed once again. The delays were due to stipulations in a line-of-credit agreements that prohibited The Cannon Group, Inc. from having more than two movies in principal photography at the same time. Warner Communications Inc. had guaranteed a $25-million line of credit for the financially troubled Cannon Group, Inc. in December 1986. Filming started on April 13, 1987. Most of the scenes were filmed around Los Angeles.

== Music ==
Due to the financial problems that Cannon Group, Inc. suffered, most of the music was re-used from previous films of the company, including 10 to Midnight (1983), Missing in Action (1984), and Invasion U.S.A. (1985). However, some of the music was composed by John Bisharat and a partner duo, Paul and Valentine McCallum.

== Release ==
=== Home media ===
Media Home Entertainment released the film on video in April 1988, having agreed with Cannon to a 2 million dollars advance. Over 100,000 cassettes were sold to rental stores. It was the best selling entry of the series in the video market.

== Reception ==
=== Box office ===
The film debuted at No. 6. It brought a profit of nearly $2 million out of the other $5 million it grossed, the equivalent of $14,550,159 in 2016 dollars.

According to Film Inquiry, "On a budget of $5 million, the film only procured a lowly sum of just under $7 million, adding to the large list of financial failures for the Cannon group who were on the verge of collapsing."

=== Critical response ===
Caryn James of The New York Times criticized the "cartoon thin" characters and the fact that the hero is essentially a dangerous sociopath, but concluded that the film serves as solid entertainment for those willing to suspend their sense of moral outrage. Kevin Thomas commented that while the film's plot is "preposterous" and its characters thin, it serves as "a solid textbook example of crisp exploitation picture craftsmanship." He credited this mainly to director J. Lee Thompson having a strong sense of efficiency and humor, ensuring that hero Paul Kersey's apparent invincibility makes the audience laugh in a way that is "friendly rather than derisive."

Variety poked fun at Paul Kersey's approach to eliminating the drug trade but summed up the film with "What raises Death Wish 4 above the usual blowout is a semi-engaging script and sure pacing by veteran action director J. Lee Thompson." Richard Harrington of The Washington Post poorly reviewed the film, citing the rudimentary and predictable plot, amateurish dialogue, inept villains, lack of tension, mindless violence, and Charles Bronson's weak performance.

In the UK film magazine Film Review, critic James Cameron Wilson praised director J. Lee Thompson's vision saying that "it's flashy without being distracting and more or less gets on with the job of storytelling." He also criticized the script, noting it needed to be smartened up, but preferred Thompson's direction over the original director Michael Winner.

== Sequel ==
A sequel titled Death Wish V: The Face of Death, was released in 1994.
