= Gannin Arnold =

- Born: Gannin Duane Arnold; October 7, 1971 (age 55); Los Angeles, California, U.S.
- Occupations: Record producer; songwriter; composer; guitarist
- Instruments: Guitar; multi-instrumentalist
- Years active: 1994–present
- Label: Red Decibel

Gannin Duane Arnold (born October 7, 1971) is an American record producer, songwriter, composer and guitarist. He has received two GMA Dove Awards for his production work with Colton Dixon, and has recorded or toured with Joe Walsh, Taylor Hawkins and the Coattail Riders, Cheap Trick, Kid Rock, K'naan and Jeff Berlin, among others. His songwriting and production credits also include work in K-pop and for Disney.

== Early life ==
Arnold was born in Los Angeles, California. He studied guitar with jazz-fusion guitarist Scott Henderson.

== Career ==
=== Rock and session work ===
In 1994, Arnold played guitar for the band Departure in Los Angeles.

Arnold was a founding member and guitarist of Taylor Hawkins and the Coattail Riders, the band led by Foo Fighters drummer Taylor Hawkins. He played on the group's self-titled 2006 debut and on Red Light Fever (2010), which was recorded at Foo Fighters' Studio 606 and featured guest appearances by Brian May, Roger Taylor, Dave Grohl and Elliot Easton. He also played guitar on "Shapes of Things", a cover of The Yardbirds song on the band's third album Get the Money (2019), which featured Pat Smear, Steve Jones and Roger Taylor.

From 2007 to 2017, Arnold toured as a member of Eagles guitarist Joe Walsh's band and co-wrote Walsh's 2012 single "Analog Man". He has also performed with The Jimmy Chamberlin Complex, is credited as a musician on Cheap Trick's The Latest (2009), and played guitar on K'naan's "If Rap Gets Jealous" from Troubadour (2009), a track that also features Metallica guitarist Kirk Hammett.

Arnold played guitar on bassist Jeff Berlin's album Aneurythms (M.A.J. Records, 2006), recorded at Brian Bromberg's studio in Los Angeles with Bromberg producing and Vinnie Colaiuta on drums; Bromberg had recommended Arnold for the session. Reviewing the album, JazzTimes noted Arnold's solos on "Justibofidus" and "Porky & Beans", while All About Jazz critic John Kelman called Arnold "the real surprise of Aneurythms", noting an energy that belied his prior work with smooth jazz artists and solos that referenced Scott Henderson without imitating him.

Arnold has toured with John Tesh and played guitar on a re-recording of Tesh's NBA on NBC theme "Roundball Rock", produced by Tim Landers.

In 2014, Arnold released a DVD of original music through Drum Channel featuring drummers Taylor Hawkins, Jimmy Chamberlin, Simon Phillips, Terry Bozzio and Gary Novak, In 2010, Arnold released a solo instrumental rock album, Not From Here, on his own Ganfu Records label. Produced by Arnold, Tim Landers and Drew Hester, the album features drummers Taylor Hawkins, Jimmy Chamberlin, Stephen Perkins, Simon Phillips, Pat Mastelotto and Tris Imboden, with Landers on bass. with Billy Mohler and Tim Landers on bass.

=== Work with Colton Dixon ===
Arnold, with Adam Watts and Andy Dodd, co-wrote and co-produced the majority of American Idol season 11 finalist Colton Dixon's debut album A Messenger (2013), the first of three consecutive Dixon albums to debut at number one on the Billboard Top Christian Albums chart. A Messenger also reached number 15 on the Billboard 200. The album won the GMA Dove Award for Rock/Contemporary Album of the Year in 2013. Arnold co-wrote and co-produced the song "Never Gone", which debuted at number one on the Billboard Christian Digital Songs chart, and co-produced "You Are".

He co-produced Dixon's second album, Anchor (2014), which also debuted at number one on the Top Christian Albums chart and won the Dove Award for Rock/Contemporary Album of the Year in 2015. With Adam Watts, under the name Broken City, Arnold co-wrote and produced four tracks on Dixon's third album, Identity (2017), which debuted at number one on the Top Christian Albums chart.

=== Other Christian music ===
Arnold co-wrote "I Surrender to You" on Jeremy Camp's Carried Me: The Worship Project (2004), which was certified Gold by the RIAA.

=== Hip hop, pop and electronic music ===
Arnold has collaborated with producer Jim Jonsin on several recordings, including co-writing Kid Rock's "Shakedown" from Bad Reputation (2022), the Yelawolf track "Special Kind of Bad" from Trunk Muzik 3 (2019), and "Money" (2026), a single by The Voice season 29 winner Alexia Jayy.

Arnold co-wrote "Down Easy" (2018), a single by Dutch electronic duo Showtek and MOTi featuring Starley and Wyclef Jean, released by Universal.

Arnold co-wrote and produced "Sparks Fly" and "You Don't Love Me Like You Should" on Hey Violet's debut EP I Can Feel It (2015), released on 5 Seconds of Summer's Hi or Hey Records imprint through Capitol Records; the EP peaked at number 149 on the Billboard 200 and number two on the Heatseekers Albums chart.

He has written and produced for K-pop artists including Twice, Shinee, Kiss of Life and Vanner, and received a Platinum certification for his contribution to Twice's &Twice. He has also worked with Simon Fuller on projects including the pop group Now United.

=== Film and television ===
Since the early 2000s, Arnold has produced and composed underscore for Disney's karaoke and read-along series, including releases tied to Frozen, Frozen II, Encanto, Moana, Moana 2, Wreck-It Ralph, The Princess and the Frog and Beauty and the Beast. He has written and produced songs for the Disney Channel series Austin & Ally and Liv and Maddie, and co-wrote the theme song for The Jeff Probst Show (2012–2013).

== Discography ==
=== Solo albums ===
- Not From Here (Ganfu Records, 2010)

=== With Taylor Hawkins and the Coattail Riders ===
- Taylor Hawkins and the Coattail Riders (2006)
- Red Light Fever (2010)
- Get the Money (2019) – "Shapes of Things"

== Awards ==
Awards received by Gannin Arnold
Year	Award	Category	Work	Result	Ref.
2013	GMA Dove Awards	Rock/Contemporary Album of the Year	A Messenger – Colton Dixon (as producer)	Won	
2015	GMA Dove Awards	Rock/Contemporary Album of the Year	Anchor – Colton Dixon (as producer)	Won	
