= Montgomery Arts House for Music and Architecture =

Coordinates: 34.020721°N 118.818069°W

Montgomery Arts House for Music and Architecture is an Eric Lloyd Wright-designed house in Malibu, California completed in 2001.

== Design of Montgomery Arts House for Music and Architecture ==
Named for the late Goldwyn Girl and businesswoman, Martha Montgomery (1920–2005), the Montgomery Arts House for Music and Architecture, also known as MAHMA, was conceived and designed by architect Eric Lloyd Wright, grandson of Frank Lloyd Wright.

Montgomery Arts House for Music and Architecture, in the California craftsman architectural style, is open year-round for classical concerts, and host artists and speakers from around the world in a salon-style environment. The three concert spaces within the house include MAHMA’s Music Room, Great Room, and Indoor/Outdoor Festival Space. Concert grand pianos grace each of the spaces, and acoustics were carefully considered in the construction and design. MAHMA overlooks the famous Zuma Beach in Malibu, California, USA.

Martha Montgomery worked as a fashion model for John Robert Powers in the 1940s, and later on the acting staff of Samuel Goldwyn Studios where she appeared with Danny Kaye in many film productions. She was the spouse of 9-time Academy Award-winning film composer, Alfred Newman from 1947–1970. As a benefactor of the arts, Montgomery gifted the Alfred Newman Recital Hall, on the University of Southern California campus, in the name of her late husband.
