= Colton Dixon =

American musician (born 1991)

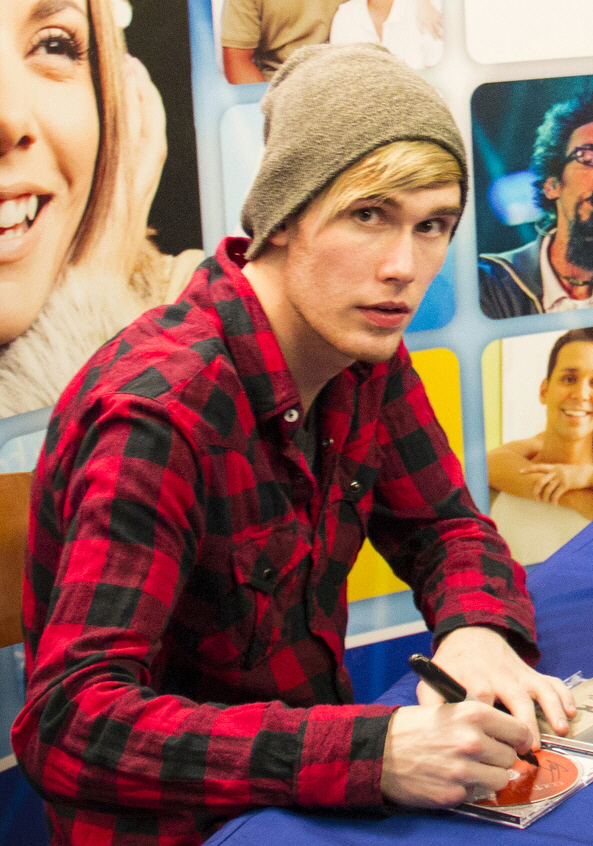

Background information
- Born: Michael Colton Dixon; October 19, 1991 (age 34); Murfreesboro, Tennessee, U.S.
- Genres: Christian rock; CCM
- Occupations: Singer-songwriter; musician
- Instruments: Vocals; piano; keytar
- Years active: 2010–present
- Labels: Sparrow; 19; Atlantic
- Spouse: Annie Coggeshall (m. 2016)
- Website: coltondixon.com

Michael Colton Dixon (born October 19, 1991) is an American singer-songwriter and musician from Murfreesboro, Tennessee. He placed seventh on the eleventh season of American Idol.

== Early life ==
Colton Dixon was born Michael Colton Dixon on October 19, 1991, to parents Michael and Teresa Dixon. He was born and raised in a middle-class family in Murfreesboro, Tennessee, along with younger sister, Schyler. His father runs a face painting/air brush company, and his family has a Jack Russell dog named Ozzy, and a cat named Chloe. He was a choir member throughout high school. In 2008, he was an extra during the filming of Hannah Montana: The Movie. He graduated from Middle Tennessee Christian School in 2010. He is a devout Christian, and has sung at several worship services including at Saddleback Church. He and Schyler are part of a Christian rock band called Messenger. He released his debut album A Messenger with EMI-CMG/Sparrow Records on January 29, 2013. His musical influences include Paramore, Thirty Seconds to Mars, Lifehouse, Evanescence, Switchfoot, Skillet, and The Fray.

== American Idol ==
=== Overview ===
Colton Dixon originally auditioned in the tenth season, along with his sister Schyler, at the Nashville auditions. However, neither of them ended up in the Top 24. Dixon performed on The Ellen DeGeneres Show on March 3, 2011.

Dixon returned in season 11, but he did not plan to audition, initially planning to merely accompany his sister Schyler to her audition. The judges implored Dixon to audition as well, where he sang David Cook's "Permanent". Both he and Schyler were awarded golden tickets. Schyler was cut yet again during the Las Vegas round, which brought her to tears.

On his final judgement performance, Dixon performed Coldplay's "Fix You" and dedicated it to his sister, Schyler. On February 23, 2012, Dixon was placed in the season 11 Top 25. In the semi-finals, he performed Paramore's "Decode". He was one of the top five male vote getters and advanced into the Top 13. Guest performer on the Top 13 Results night and runner-up of American Idol season 10 Lauren Alaina named Dixon and fellow contestant Jessica Sanchez as her two favorites to win the competition. His elimination on April 19, 2012, was considered a big surprise because he had never been in the bottom three.

=== Performances/results ===
Episode	Theme	Song choice	Result
Audition	Auditioner's Choice	"Permanent"	Advanced
Hollywood Round, Part 1	First Solo	"Only Hope"	Advanced
Hollywood Round, Part 2	Group Performance	Not aired	Advanced
Hollywood Round, Part 3	Second Solo	"What About Now"	Advanced
Las Vegas Round	Songs from the 1950s Group Performance	"Dedicated to the One I Love"	Advanced
Final Judgment	Final Solo	"Fix You"	Advanced
Top 25 (13 Men)	Personal Choice	"Decode"	Advanced
Top 13	Stevie Wonder	"Lately"	Safe
Top 11	Year They Were Born	"Broken Heart"	Safe
Top 10	Billy Joel	"Piano Man"	Safe
Top 9	Their Personal Idols	Solo "Everything"	Safe
Top 9	Their Personal Idols	Trio "Landslide" / "Edge of Seventeen" / "Don't Stop" with Phillip Phillips & Elise Testone	Safe
Top 8	Songs from the 1980s	Duet "Islands in the Stream" with Skylar Laine	Safe
Top 8	Songs from the 1980s	Solo "Time After Time"	Safe
Top 7	Songs from the 2010s	Solo "Love the Way You Lie"	Safe
Top 7	Songs from the 2010s	Duet "Don't You Wanna Stay" with Skylar Laine	Safe
Top 7^{1}	Songs from Now & Then	"Bad Romance"	Eliminated
Top 7^{1}	Songs from Now & Then	"September"	Eliminated

- ^Note 1 Due to the judges using their one save on Jessica Sanchez, the Top 7 remained intact for another week.

== Career ==
=== 2012–14: Post-Idol and A Messenger ===
Following his elimination, Dixon appeared on various shows. He performed a rendition of "Everything" by Lifehouse on Live! with Kelly on April 23, 2012. He treated Access Hollywood viewers to a reprise of the same swan song. He had a guest appearance on the Today Show on April 24, 2012. He came back to The Ellen DeGeneres Show to perform Billy Joel’s "Piano Man" on April 26, 2012. Dixon and fellow contestant Elise Testone performed on The Tonight Show with Jay Leno on April 27, 2012. He was invited to the White House Correspondents Dinner as a special guest of the Christian Broadcasting Network on April 28, 2012. He also started collaborating with Brandon Heath. He debuted an original song called "Never Gone" at the American Idols LIVE! Tour 2012. Colton says he wants his debut album to feature "faith-based music" without alienating a wider audience.

He released the original song he performed on the Idol tour, "Never Gone", on iTunes September 25, 2012, which is included on his debut album. |Never Gone| debuted at number one on the Christian Digital Sales chart. His debut single entitled "You Are" hit U.S. radio airwaves on October 19, 2012, and was released on iTunes on October 30, 2012. This was his second consecutive song to reach number one on the Christian Digital Sales chart. It also became a Top 10 hit on both the Christian Airplay chart and Hot Christian Songs chart. On January 3, 2013, Dixon led the song "Jesus Paid It All" at the Passion 2013 Conference. On January 29, 2013, Dixon released his album A Messenger through Sparrow Records. It debuted at number 15 on the Billboard 200, number one on the U.S. Christian Chart and number one on the U.S. Gospel Chart. Dixon and Jessica Sanchez held a concert at the Smart Araneta Coliseum in Manila on February 14. Dixon and Josh Wilson are supporting Third Day on The Miracle Tour, the tour started on February 21, 2013, in Fairfax, Virginia and ends on May 19, 2013, in Orlando, Florida. Dixon's sister, Schyler, was also on the tour for some dates. Dixon appeared on the twelfth season of American Idol on March 28, 2013, on the Top 8 results show singing his new single "Love Has Come for Me". "Love Has Come for Me" reached 28 on the Christian Digital Sales chart. He went on the Hits Deep Tour with TobyMac in November and December 2013.

Dixon re-released A Messenger on January 7, 2014, which included remixes and tracks included in special store editions.

=== 2014–15: Anchor and The Calm Before the Storm ===
It has been announced that he plans on releasing his second album in the summer of 2014. The lead single, "More of You", was released to iTunes on June 24, 2014. It reached number nine on the Hot Christian Songs chart and number five on the Christian Airplay chart. It also reached number two on the Christian Digital Sales chart. On June 19, 2014, Dixon revealed that his sophomore studio album would be titled Anchor and would be released on August 19, 2014, along with the album's artwork. Two promotional singles were released, "Our Time Is Now" and "Dare to Believe". "Our Time Is Now" reached 45 on the Hot Christian Songs chart and 33 on the Christian Digital Sales chart. "Dare to Believe" reached 38 on the Hot Christian Songs chart and reached 19 on the Christian Digital Sales chart. After the albums release, two single were subsequently released, "Through All of It" and "Limitless". "Through All of It" reached 11 on the Hot Christian Songs chart and number six on the Christian Airplay chart. "Limitless" reached number 21 on the Hot Christian Songs chart and number 18 on the Christian Airplay chart. Anchor debuted at number 23 on the Billboard 200 and debuted at number one on the Top Christian Album chart.

On July 26, 2015, Colton announced via Twitter that he will participate in This is Not a Test Tour with tobyMac and Britt Nicole. An album, The Calm Before the Storm will be released on September 11 that will contain dual EPs, Calm, a collection of acoustic songs and Storm, a compilation of remixed tracks, that will contain songs from A Messenger and Anchor, including versions of "You Are", "Never Gone" and "More of You".

=== 2016–2020: Identity ===
Dixon released a single, "All That Matters", on January 13, 2017, and his new album, Identity, was released on March 24, 2017.

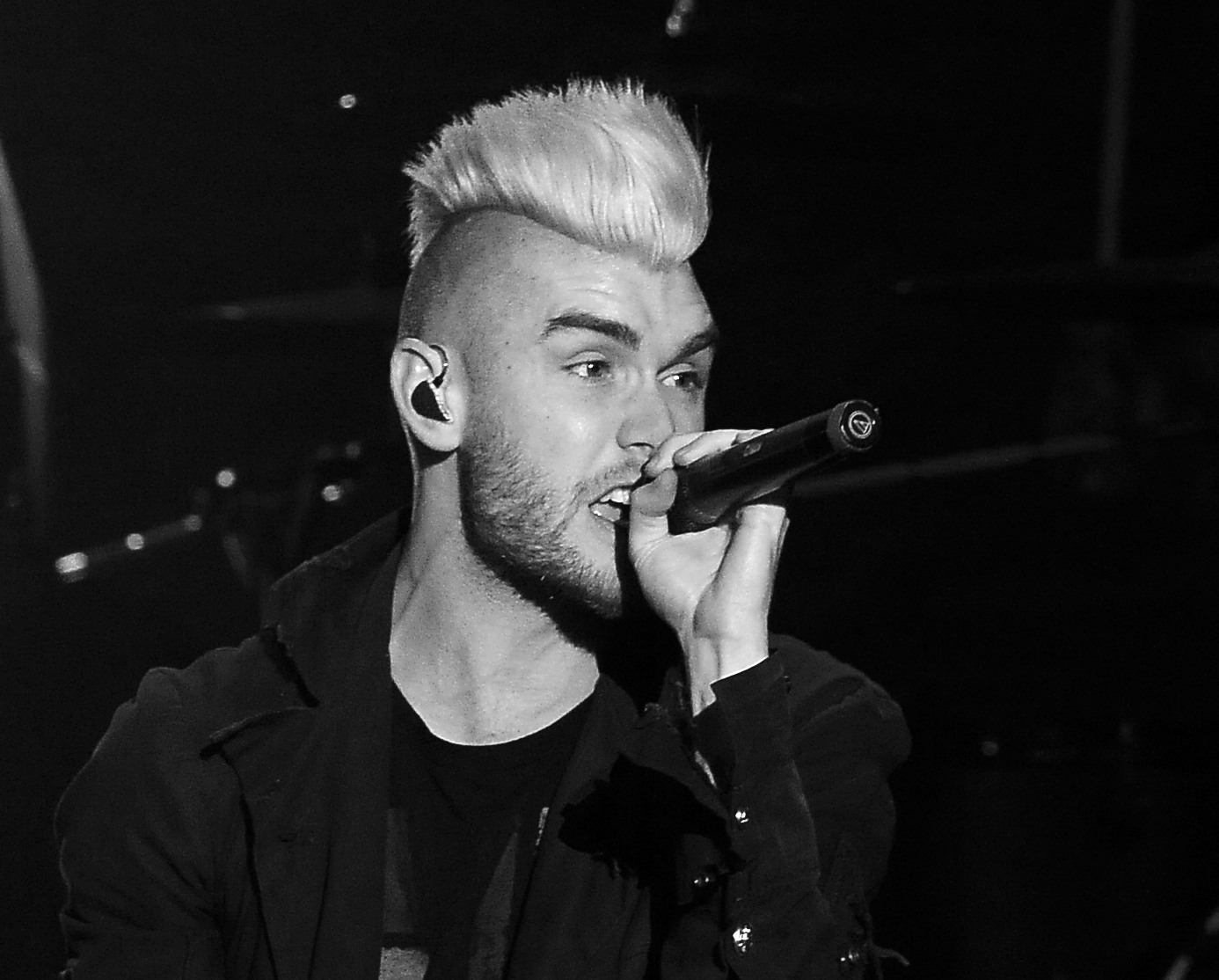
TobyMac- The Hits Deep Tour

== Personal life ==
In 2012, Dixon started dating Annie Coggeshall. They became engaged in September 2015, and wed on January 8, 2016. In February 2020, they announced they were expecting their first child, expected in autumn. On August 16, 2020, they welcomed twin daughters.

== Discography ==
=== Studio albums ===
Title	Album details	Peak chart positions			Sales
Title	Album details	US	US Christ.	UK C&G	Sales
A Messenger	Release date: January 29, 2013; Label: EMI CMG/Sparrow Records/19 Recordings; Formats: CD, digital download	15	1	12	US: 100,000
Anchor	Release date: August 19, 2014; Label: EMI CMG/Sparrow/19; Formats: CD, digital download	23	1	—	US: 28,000
Identity	Release date: March 24, 2017; Label: Capitol CMG/Sparrow/19; Formats: CD, digital download	73	1	—	US: 7,000
"—" denotes a recording that did not chart

=== Remix albums ===
Title	Album details	Peak chart positions		
Title	Album details	US	US Christ.	US Dance
The Calm Before the Storm	Release date: September 11, 2015; Label: EMI CMG/Sparrow/19; Formats: CD, digital download	—	44	11
"—" denotes a recording that did not chart

=== Extended plays ===
Title	Album details	Peak chart positions		
Title	Album details	US	US Christ.	US Dance
Calm	Release date: September 11, 2015; Label: EMI CMG/Sparrow Records/19 Recordings; Formats: Digital download	—	25	—
Storm	Release date: September 11, 2015; Label: EMI CMG/Sparrow/19; Formats: Digital download	—	42	13
Colton Dixon	Release date: May 15, 2020; Label: Atlantic; Formats: CD, Digital download	—	32	—
Canvas	Release Date: April 28, 2023; Label: Capitol CMG/Sparrow/19; Formats: CD, Digital Download	—	—	—
"—" denotes a recording that did not chart

=== Singles ===
Title	Year	Chart positions					Certifications (sales threshold)	Album
Title	Year	US Christ	US Christ Air.	US Christ AC	US Christ Digital	US Christ Stream.	Certifications (sales threshold)	Album
"You Are"	2012	10		12	1	—		A Messenger
"Love Has Come for Me"	2013	—	—	—	28	—		A Messenger
"Jingle Bells"	2013	—	43	21	—	—		Non-album single
"More of You"	2014	9	5	8	2	—		Anchor
"Through All of It"	2015	11	6	10	9	—		Anchor
"Limitless"	2015	21	18	—	—	—		Identity
"All That Matters"	2017	17	15	18	15	—		Identity
"Miracles"	2020	14	5	8	14	—	RIAA: Gold	Colton Dixon
"Let It Snow"	2020	—	35	—	—	—		Non-album singles
"Made to Fly"	2021	34	31	—	—	—		Non-album singles
"Build a Boat"	2022	1	1	1	1	5	RIAA: Gold	Canvas
"My Light"	2023	19	13	11	—	—		Canvas
"Home For Christmas"	2023	—	39	23	—	—		Non-album singles
"Rest of My Life" (from Sight)	2024	—	—	—	—	—		Non-album singles
"Up + Up"	2024	8	2	2	—	—		Non-album singles
"The Love I Have for You"	2025	23	14	11	—	—		Non-album singles
"In Spite of Me"	2026	—	—	—	—	—		Non-album singles
"—" denotes a recording that did not chart

=== Promotional singles ===
Title	Year	Chart positions				Certifications (sales threshold)	Album
Title	Year	US	US Christ	US Christ Air.	US Christ Digital	Certifications (sales threshold)	Album
"Never Gone"	2012	—	24	24	1		A Messenger
"Our Time Is Now"	2014	—	45	—	33		Anchor
"Dare to Believe"	2014	—	38	—	19		Anchor
"The Devil Is a Liar"	2020	—	41	36	—		Colton Dixon
"—" denotes a recording that did not chart

=== Other charted and certified songs ===
Title	Year	Chart positions		Certifications (sales threshold)	Album
Title	Year	US	US Christ	Certifications (sales threshold)	Album
"The Shape of Your Love"	2014	—	44		A Messenger (deluxe edition)
"—" denotes a recording that did not chart

=== Music videos ===
Title
"Never Gone"
"More of You"
"Through All of It"
"All That Matters"
"Miracles"
"Made to Fly"
"Can't Quit You"
"Up + Up"
"Up + Up (Live)"
"Nothing But The Blood (Live)"

== Awards ==
=== GMA Dove Awards ===
Year	Category	Result
2013	New Artist of the Year	Nominated
2013	Best Rock/Contemporary Album of the Year (A Messenger)	Won
2013	Best Rock/Contemporary Song of the Year ("Never Gone")	Nominated
2015	Best Rock/Contemporary Album of the Year (Anchor)	Won
2023	Song of the Year ("Build A Boat")	Nominated
2026	Rock/Contemporary Recorded Song of the Year ("The Love I Have for You")	Pending

=== We Love Awards ===
Year	Category	Result
2025	Pop Song of the Year ("The Love I Have For You")	Nominated
