= John Tesh =

American musician and television presenter (born 1952)

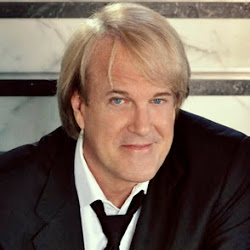

Background information
- Born: John Frank Tesh Jr. July 9, 1952 (age 74); Garden City, New York, U.S.
- Genres: Pop, contemporary worship, 20th-century classical music
- Occupations: Composer, musician, radio host, news anchor, sportscaster
- Instruments: Piano, keyboards
- Spouse: Julie Wright (m. 1982, div. 1991) Connie Sellecca (m. 1992–present)
- Website: tesh.com

John Frank Tesh Jr. (born July 9, 1952) is an American musician and radio and television presenter. He wrote the NBA on NBC basketball theme "Roundball Rock" and hosts the Intelligence for Your Life radio show. In addition, since 2014, he has hosted Intelligence for Your Life TV with his wife, Connie Sellecca.

Tesh has won six Emmys and has four gold albums, two Grammy nominations, and an Associated Press award for investigative journalism. Tesh has sold over eight million records. His live concerts have raised more than $7 million for PBS. He has co-hosted the television program Entertainment Tonight. He has previously worked as a sports commentator and host for the Olympic Games, Wimbledon, the US Open, the Tour de France, Ironman Triathlon, and as a news anchor and reporter. In 2018, Tesh was inducted into the North Carolina Music Hall of Fame.

== Early life ==
Tesh was born in Garden City, New York, on Long Island, the son of Mildred (Bunny), a nurse, and John Frank Tesh Sr., a textile chemist, both from North Carolina. He graduated from Garden City High School in 1970. Playing piano and trumpet from the age of six, he was named to the New York State Symphonic Orchestra in high school, while also playing the organ in a rock band. Tesh studied communications and music at North Carolina State University, and was expelled from the university in his junior year after he forged a professor's signature on a drop-add form. He was also a "walk on" with the varsity lacrosse and soccer teams.

While at North Carolina State, studying physics and chemistry, he took a TV and radio course. Tesh worked part-time reading the news for Rick Dees at WKIX (AM) Raleigh in 1974. His roommate, Bill Leslie, anchor at WRAL-TV, helped him get into the radio and TV field. While in the area, Tesh worked as a news anchor in Raleigh, Orlando, Nashville, and New York's WCBS-TV; this portion of his career spanned 12 years.

== Career ==
=== Entertainment Tonight and television career ===
Tesh's television career included a stint as a news anchor and reporter at WSM-TV (now WSMV-TV) in Nashville, Tennessee, in the 1970s, where he often covered the same stories as Oprah Winfrey, who worked at a competing Nashville station. From Nashville, Tesh moved to WTVD in Durham, North Carolina, then to WFTV in Orlando, and finally to New York's WCBS-TV, where, at age 22, he was the youngest reporter. Tesh was a roving reporter for CBS during the 1978 New York City Marathon, which he ran and completed in 3:51:56. He became better known when he co-hosted the television show Entertainment Tonight from 1986 to 1996.

Tesh was also a sportscaster for CBS and later NBC, anchoring events such as the Tour de France bicycle race from 1983 through 1986 (he anchored the first American broadcast of that event), the US Open, and gymnastics at the 1992 and 1996 Summer Olympics.

Tesh hosted the short-lived One on One with John Tesh daytime talk show in 1991–92 on NBC and co-hosted the show John & Leeza from Hollywood with fellow Entertainment Tonight personality Leeza Gibbons from 1993 to 1994, also on NBC daytime. In 2014, he returned to syndicated television in the series Intelligence for Your Life TV, based on his radio show.

Tesh appeared in "The Icarus Factor", an episode of Star Trek: The Next Generation, playing a Klingon warrior. He also appeared as himself in a 1987 episode of the daytime serial Santa Barbara.

=== Musical career ===
In 1987, Yanni was assembling his first touring band to promote his album Out of Silence, as well as selections from Keys to Imagination. Being good friends, Tesh asked Yanni if he could join the band as keyboardist along with Joyce Imbesi and drummer Charlie Adams, as he had never been onstage for a live performance, and he needed the experience. Despite already having a full-time job with Entertainment Tonight, and the long hours of rehearsal for the band, he performed exceptionally well, although he participated in only one tour with Yanni, playing in approximately twelve shows, including the "1988 Concert Series", before being replaced by Bradley Joseph. Later, Yanni assisted Tesh in signing his first recording contract with Private Music.

In the 1990s, Tesh was credited with the theme music to Bobby's World, hosted by Howie Mandel, and the NBA on NBC theme, known as "Roundball Rock". Tesh composed the NBA on NBC theme after an idea hit him while traveling. In order to recall his idea at a later juncture, Tesh recorded the initial beat vocally on his answering machine, by ringing his home phone and leaving a message for himself. The theme was used for the NBA on NBC before the network stopped carrying NBA games following the 2001–02 season (as well as an electric guitar-driven spinoff that was used on NBC's WNBA telecasts from 1997 to 2002), though NBC would revive the theme for its basketball coverage during the 2008 Summer Olympics. Tesh would later license the song to Fox Sports for its college basketball coverage.

In August 1994, John performed at the Red Rocks Amphitheatre in Morrison, Colorado, for his first Live at Red Rocks concert. Tesh performed with conductor John Bisharat and the 70-piece Colorado Symphony Orchestra. The concert featured Tesh playing grand piano, Charlie Bisharat playing electric violin, and Everette Harp playing alto saxophone. Also featured were Olympic gold medal-gymnasts Nadia Comaneci (1976) and Bart Conner (1984) performing gymnastic routines specially-choreographed to Tesh's music.

After Tesh left his ten-year job as co-host for Entertainment Tonight in 1996, he turned to his career as a contemporary keyboardist. This led to him starting The John Tesh Radio Show in 2003.

=== John Tesh Radio Show and spin-offs ===
Tesh currently has a nationally syndicated radio show called the John Tesh Radio Show, which typically airs on adult contemporary, classic hits, Christian and soft rock radio formats. The music is interspersed with various factoids and other information Tesh considers useful to listeners, often with topics such as health and well-being.

These factoids are called "Intelligence for Your Life", played on radio stations across the United States and Canada, and the Armed Forces Network. Select pieces of "Intelligence for Your Life" are broken up and distributed in vignette form to other radio stations (including talk radio formats) and for use on morning shows. There is also a three-hour weekend show, "Intelligence for Your Health", launched in 2010, hosted by Connie Sellecca.

Across all of its versions, Tesh's radio programs reach listeners across the United States, Canada, and United Kingdom, placing it on the list of most-listened-to radio programs. Tesh's main rival is Delilah, and these two shows are sometimes aired in the same market on competing stations, or occasionally on the same stations in differing time slots.

The show started as a weekend show in 2000 on Clear Channel's KKDJ-FM/Bakersfield and then a few other stations, expanding to a daily version in 2003. The program was originally syndicated by Westwood One under the name On the Air with John Tesh, albeit with a slightly different format. It is produced by Tesh with a staff of 35 and still distributed by syndicator Westwood One. In September 2016, the partnership with Westwood One was renewed in a new multi-year agreement. At the time, Westwood One indicated that it was airing on 280 radio stations. As of 2022, the programs are distributed through a partnership with Compass Media Networks.

In late 2014, a television version of these factoids, Intelligence for Your Life TV, debuted in syndication to local stations. In April 2016, the TV program was seen on 174 stations. The series also features health segments hosted by his wife, Connie Sellecca, based on her own radio program, "Intelligence for Your Health".

Tesh also authored a book, Intelligence for Your Life: Powerful Lessons for Personal Growth, in 2008, reprinted in 2012 (ISBN 0849964636, publisher Thomas Nelson).

== Personal life ==
Tesh married actress Julie Wright in 1982; the marriage lasted nine years. He has been married to actress Connie Sellecca since 1992; they have one daughter together, Prima. Gib Gerard, Sellecca's son with actor Gil Gerard, now appears on some of Tesh's radio and TV programs. Tesh and Sellecca reside in Los Angeles. In the 1970s, he also briefly dated Oprah Winfrey.

Tesh was raised a Baptist and was involved in the church during his youth. He played organ, sang in the choir, and went to church camp. He became inactive in the church during his adult life, but became involved again after Sellecca introduced him to Louis Lapides, a Jewish Christian, former pastor, and founder of Beth Ariel Fellowship in Sherman Oaks. Since then, he has written and performed Christian music.

== Awards ==
During his early career as a television journalist in the 1970s, Tesh received an Associated Press award for investigative journalism. In 2018, John Tesh was inducted into the North Carolina Music Hall of Fame. In 2019, he was inducted into the National Radio Hall of Fame. In 2007, Tesh won the Syndicated Personality/Show of the Year award by Radio & Records magazine for his radio show. Tesh was nominated in 2003 for the Grammy for "Best Pop Instrumental Album" for Power of Love. John has also earned three gold albums, six Emmys for his sports themes, and a Keyboard Magazine Award.

== Discography ==
=== Studio albums ===
- 1987: Music from the Tour de France, Vol. I (Tesh Music BMI)
- 1988: Tour de France (Private Music)
- 1989: Garden City (Cypress)
- 1992: A Romantic Christmas (Decca)
- 1992: Ironman Triathlon (GTSP)
- 1992: Music in the Key of Love (GTSP)
- 1992: The Games (GTSP)
- 1993: Monterey Nights (GTSP)
- 1993: Winter Song (GTSP) 1994: (Decca)
- 1994: A Family Christmas (Decca)
- 1994: Sax by the Fire (Decca)
- 1995: Sax on the Beach (Decca)
- 1996: Discovery (Decca)
- 1996: Choirs of Christmas (GTSP)
- 1997: Avalon (Decca)
- 1997: Sax All Night (Decca)
- 1998: Grand Passion (GTSP)
- 1998: Guitar by the Fire (Decca)
- 1998: Songs from the Road (BMG)
- 1998: Pure Movies (GTSP)
- 1999: One World (GTSP)
- 1999: John Tesh & Friends (Columbia River)
- 2000: Pure Hymns (Faith MD)
- 2000: Pure Movies, Vol. 2 (Garden City)
- 2001: Pure Orchestra (Garden City)
- 2001: Pure Gospel (Faith MD)
- 2001: Classical Music for an Intimate Mood (Garden City)
- 2001: Classical Music for a Stress-Free World (Garden City)
- 2001: Classical Music for Babies (and Their Moms) Vol. 1 & 2 (Garden City)
- 2001: Classical Music for a Prayerful Mood (Garden City & Faith MD)
- 2002: Awesome God (Garden City)
- 2002: The Power of Love (Garden City)
- 2002: Christmas Worship (Word)
- 2002: A Deeper Faith (Garden City)
- 2002: God of Wonders (Garden City)
- 2002: Worship God (Garden City)
- 2003: A Deeper Faith, Vol. 2 (Garden City)
- 2007: A Passionate Life (Garden City)
- 2008: Grand Piano Christmas (Garden City)
- 2009: Grand Piano Worship (Garden City)
- 2010: Grand Piano Romance (Garden City)
- 2011: Big Band Christmas (Garden City)
- 2012: Big Band (Garden City)
- 2025: Sports (GTS Records)

=== Live albums ===
- 1995: Live at Red Rocks (Decca)
- 2004: Worship at Red Rocks (live) (Garden City)
- 2005: Red Rocks Platinum (live) (Garden City)
- 2008: Alive: Music & Dance (Garden City)
- 2020: Songs and Stories from the Grand Piano (Garden City)

=== Compilations and collections ===
- 1990: Tour de France – The Early Years (Private Music)
- 1993: Monterey Nights (Decca)
- 1995: Anthology
- 1997: Victory – the sports collection (GTSP)
- 1999: Heart of the Sunrise - The Millennium Collection (John Tesh)
- 1999: One Day (Unison)
- 2000: Pure Hymns (Faith MD)
- 2000: Forever More: The Greatest Hits of John Tesh (Decca)
- 2003: Worship Collection: Awesome God (Garden City)
- 2009: The Best of Christmas
- 2009: John Tesh – Greatest Hits – Live in Concert Vol. 1 CD/DVD (Garden City)

=== Singles ===
- 1988: A Thousand Summers (single)
- 1989: You Break It (Atlantic) (single)

=== Other albums ===
- 1995: Backstage with John Tesh (Digital Entertainment) (an interactive CD-rom)
- 2005: Drive Time Intelligence (26 tracks of Intelligence For Your Life on the go, plus 3 bonus music tracks)
- 2010: God of Wonders (Word)

== Videography ==
- 1993: A Romantic Christmas
- 1995: Live in Monterey
- 1995: Live at Red Rocks
- 1997: The Avalon Concert
- 2000: One World
- 2002: Christmas Worship
- 2004: Worship at Red Rocks
- 2008: Alive: Music & Dance
- 2009: Greatest Hits: Live in Concert, Vol. 1
- 2012: Big Band Live
- 2020: Songs and Stories from the Grand Piano

Preceded by Robb Weller	Co-host of Entertainment Tonight; 1986–1996	Succeeded by Bob Goen
