= Roundball Rock =

Single by John Tesh
- Released: 1990
- Recorded: 1990
- Genre: Rock
- Length: 2:41
- Label: GTS Records
- Songwriter: John Tesh
- Producer: John Tesh

Audio
- "Roundball Rock" on YouTube

"Roundball Rock" is a musical composition by John Tesh composed in 1990 for the NBA on NBC. The tune has served as the theme for the NBA on NBC from 1990 to 2002 and again since 2025. It also has served as the theme for Fox College Hoops since 2018.

== Development ==
"Roundball Rock" was first developed by John Tesh in July 1989 at a hotel room in Megève, France. Tesh was in France at the time covering the Tour de France for CBS. NBC had recently acquired National Basketball Association (NBA) broadcasting rights from CBS, and let Tesh know it was looking for theme music. While asleep, Tesh came up with the theme and instantly woke up to record it. Without any of his instruments nearby or a tape recorder, Tesh called his answering machine at home and sang a preliminary version of the melody so he would not forget it. When he came back from France, Tesh began to start recording from his studio in Los Angeles.

The recording was submitted to NBC on a VHS tape consisting of fast break highlights soundtracked to the completed theme. Tesh also sent the tape under a pseudonym because he was already well known as a TV host and sportscaster, knowing that the perception was that "the guy that reads the celebrity birthdays on [Entertainment Tonight] isn't going to be writing our sports themes". Before submitting the tape, Tesh originally titled the tape "Roundball Rock" as a placeholder, but the name ultimately stuck. The name was derived from a game announcer, believed by Tesh to be Dick Stockton, saying "This is great roundball!”. Amongst six submitted candidates, NBC ultimately selected "Roundball Rock".

== Composition ==
"Roundball Rock" is mainly anchored in synthesizers, with a mix consisting of string, brass, trumpets, low brass, violins, cellos, and violas. The tune is in the key of A minor.

== Usage ==
=== NBA on NBC ===
"Roundball Rock" made its NBC broadcast debut on November 3, 1990, during NBC's opening season matchup between the Los Angeles Lakers and San Antonio Spurs. The theme was played an estimated 12,000 times over the course of NBC's 12-year run from 1990 to 2002. A more rock-oriented variant was introduced in 1997 to coincide with the debut of the WNBA. That theme was also used on NBC's WNBA telecasts only. After NBC lost NBA and WNBA rights to ABC and ESPN in 2002, Tesh offered the incoming networks the rights to use his theme, but they declined and chose to compose their own theme music instead. In addition, the Midway Games 2000 game NBA Showtime: NBA on NBC, which utilized the show's license, included "Roundball Rock" as its theme song and had soundbites extracted from the song for different sound effects.

"Roundball Rock" has since been revived for NBC's coverage of basketball at the Summer Olympics on multiple occasions. It was first brought back in 2008 in commercial bumpers and starting lineup announcements. NBC has since used the theme for all its Summer Olympics basketball events since 2016.

In May 2024, Tesh indicated to The Dan Le Batard Show with Stugotz that "Roundball Rock" would return to NBC under a new arrangement for the 2024 Summer Olympics and potential regain of NBA rights. Initially, when NBC announced its new deal on July 24, the network indicated that "Roundball Rock" would return as its main theme again when it returns to airing the NBA in 2025. However, CNBC would report later in November that Tesh and NBC Sports had yet to agree to a deal to use the theme. During a tease for the NBA on NBC during its coverage of the 2025 Kentucky Derby, it was revealed that the theme would return for its NBA coverage.

=== Other usage ===
The theme was sampled by Nelly for his song "Heart of a Champion" from his studio album, Sweat, and compilation album Sweatsuit. "Roundball Rock" was also used in The Boondocks episode "Ballin'".

A re-recording of the tune is used by Tesh as theme music for his syndicated radio show, as well as for the television series Intelligence for Your Life that Tesh co-hosts with his wife Connie Sellecca.

A 2013 Saturday Night Live sketch shows Tesh (portrayed by Jason Sudeikis) with his fictional brother Dave (Tim Robinson) playing the tune for NBC executives (Vince Vaughn, Kenan Thompson, Kate McKinnon), complete with lyrics. The real John Tesh called the bit "the greatest thing that's ever happened to me" and says he shows it in his concerts.

In December 2018, Fox Sports announced that it had acquired the rights to "Roundball Rock" for its own Fox College Hoops broadcasts, and continued to use it concurrently with NBC during the 2025–26 season; NBC reportedly had to sublicense rights from Fox to use the theme for its revived NBA package. Fox's license expired after that season, and Fox began to use a sound-alike in November 2026.

All Elite Wrestling (AEW) secured the rights to "Roundball Rock" in December 2022 for use during promotion of Winter Is Coming, with AEW president Tony Khan saying he is a major fan of the theme.

== Legacy ==
"Roundball Rock" is considered one of the greatest television sports themes of all time. Its original run with the NBA on NBC coincided with one of the NBA's most popular and revered eras, of the Chicago Bulls dynasty led by Michael Jordan and the Los Angeles Lakers' three-peat with Shaquille O'Neal and Kobe Bryant. Its presentation and usage on NBC's broadcasts was credited with building excitement for the games and enhancing the television watching experience. Former NBC Sports reporter Jim Gray likened the excitement "Roundball Rock" generated to watching The NFL Today with Brent Musburger on CBS. Sports media personality Rob Perez said, "If the NBA was a religion, 'Roundball Rock' would be the congregation's opening hymn. For those who follow the NBA, that song has been the 'Hallelujah' chorus."

Since the NBA on NBC initially ended, "Roundball Rock" has taken on new life through internet memes and parodies. In August 2008, Tesh uploaded to YouTube a 1997 live performance of the theme on Catalina Island. The video has over 2.4 million views. Former ESPN sportswriter Bill Simmons said of the performance: "I think he means to be ironic, but there's something non-ironic about his quest to be ironic. Again, he's dressed like a waiter on a cruise ship." Despite its other usages, "Roundball Rock" is still most strongly associated with the NBA on NBC.
