= Tim Landers =

American bassist (born 1956)

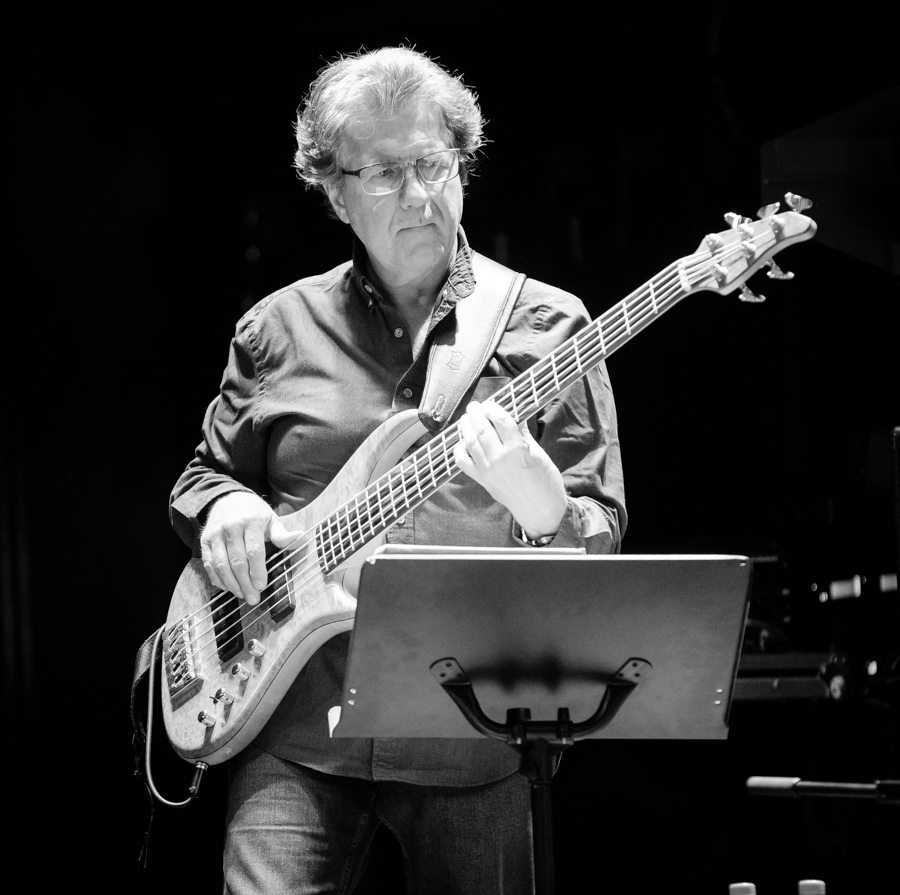
- Landers performing in 2019

Background information
- Born: Timothy Gerard Landers; November 1, 1956 (age 69); Taunton, Massachusetts, U.S.
- Genres: Jazz, rock
- Occupation: Musician
- Instruments: Bass guitar, double bass
- Years active: 1978–present

Timothy Gerard Landers (born November 1, 1956) is an American bassist best known for his contribution to the 1970s-80s jazz-fusion genre and his work with Al Di Meola, Billy Cobham, and Gil Evans. Landers is a session musician and was a member of Tom Scott's band on The Pat Sajak Show.

Born in Taunton, Massachusetts, Landers has worked with Tracy Chapman, Tori Amos, Al Stewart, Crimson Jazz Trio, Lee Ritenour, Dave Grusin, and Loreena McKennitt. He is also known for his contribution to bass guitar design with the Pedulla Buzz bass and Peavey Dyna Bass as well as his Signature Series, the Peavey TL-5 and TL-6.

== Career ==
=== Musical beginnings ===
Landers was influenced to pursue music by his parents. His father played guitar, electric bass, and lap steel guitar professionally. His mother sang with church choirs and played piano. Landers took up the drums first, then guitar at 8 years old and by the time he was 11 had formed his first band in Brockton, Massachusetts called The Jordan Empire. The band members would each earn about $5 for playing songs by the Beatles, Rolling Stones, Steppenwolf, Jimi Hendrix at private functions, then eventually at larger venues. At age 14 he shifted to bass in order to play with his high school big band and soon found himself busy playing with a number of bands in the Brockton area, most notably a southern Massachusetts rock group called Pledge.

Landers studied at the Berklee College of Music. During his second semester he was invited to tour with Al Kooper, drummer Vinnie Colaiuta, and trumpeter Stanton Davis. When he returned to Boston, he played with Tiger Okoshi, Mike Stern, Mick Goodrick, Mike Metheny and Dean Brown (guitarist).

=== Professional music career ===
Landers moved to New York City in 1978 and lived there until 1984. He worked with Gil Evans, Al Di Meola, Billy Cobham, Michael Brecker, Barry Finnerty, Horace Arnold, Sam Morrison, Tiger Okoshi, Mike Stern, Nicholas Pike, and Michael Shrieve. He was a founding member of the jazz-fusion group Vital Information with David Wilczewski and Journey drummer Steve Smith.

Landers shifted gears in 1984 and moved to Los Angeles. He worked with Joe Chiccarelli, Richie Wise, Paul Brown, and David Kershenbaum and recorded with Tori Amos, Tracy Chapman, Stan Ridgeway, Al Stewart, Vince Neil, Andy Kim, Graham Nash, Loreena McKennitt, Beyoncé, The Pointer Sisters, Stevie Nicks, and Jethro Tull. He continued to contribute to jazz recordings on the west coast for Lee Ritenour, Dave Grusin, Tom Scott, Frank Gambale, Eric Marienthal, and Gannin Arnold.

He and former King Crimson drummer Ian Wallace and pianist Jody Nardone formed the Crimson Jazz Trio in 2005 and they recorded two albums before Wallace's death. Landers spent a number of years as musical director for pianist John Tesh and produced Tesh's recordings, including two big-band jazz albums, and was nominated for both a Grammy and GMA Dove Award. Landers has written for national commercials for Nike, MacDonald's, Sprint, and Coca-Cola.

As of 2023 Landers has been touring and recording with Billy Cobham and Randy Brecker in the "Crosswinds Project" and staying busy in the studios recording with independent artists; UK World Music group Secret Sky and up and coming guitar wizard John Philbrick.

== Nominations ==
- In 2000, he was nominated with John Tesh for a GMA Dove Award as producer for "Best Instrumental Album" for Tesh's One World.
- In 2003, he was nominated with John Tesh for a Grammy Award as producer for "Best Pop Instrumental Album" for Tesh's The Power of Love.
- In 2015, he was nominated for a Daytime Emmy Award for television music production for Intelligence for Your Life.

== Basses ==
Landers uses the Pedulla "Nuance" model, a 5 string bolt-on electric bass custom built for Tim by M.V. Pedulla Guitars, and a Pedulla 4 string fretless "Buzz" bass that he helped Mike Pedulla with in the initial design along with Mark Egan. He also uses his own signature model basses designed by Landers and produced by Peavey Electronics from 1988 to 1996.

== Discography ==
=== As band member ===
With Steve Smith and Vital Information

- Vital Information (Columbia, 1983)
- Orion (Columbia, 1984)
- Global Beat (Columbia, 1986)
- Fiafiaga (Columbia, 1988)

With Billy Cobham's Glass Menagerie

- Flight Time (1980, In-Akustiik) with Barry Finnerty and Don Grolnick
- Stratus (1981, In-Akustik) with Mike Stern, Gil Goldstein and Michał Urbaniak
- Observations and Reflections (1982, Elektra Musician) with Dean Brown and Gil Goldstein
- Smokin' Live at Montreux (1983, Elektra-Musician)

With Crimson Jazz Trio

- King Crimson Songbook Volume 1 (Voiceprint, 2005)
- King Crimson Songbook Volume 2 (Inner Knot, 2009)

=== As sideman ===
With Gil Evans

- Live at the Public Theater Vol 1 (Trio, 1981)
- Live at the Public Theater Vol 2 (Trio, 1983)
- Live in Switzerland (Atlantic, 1991)

With Frank Gambale

- Thunder from Down Under (JVC, 1991)
- Note Worker (JVC, 1993)
- Thinking Out Loud (JVC, 1995)

With David Hallyday

- True Cool (Scotti Bros., 1988)
- Rockin' Heart (Scotti Bros., 1990)

With Pat Kelley

- I'll Stand Up (Nova, 1992)
- The Road Home (Positive Music, 1994)

With Loreena McKennitt

- An Ancient Muse (Verve, 2006)
- Nights from the Alhambra (Quinlan Road, 2007)

With Secret Sky

- Secret Sky (Sylvan House Music, 2016)
- Opium (Sylvan House Music, 2023)

With Tiger Okoshi

- Tiger's Baku (JVC, 1981)
- Mudcake (JVC, 1983)

With Lee Ritenour

- Portrait (GRP, 1987)
- GRP All-Stars – Super Live in Japan (GRP, 1987)

With John Philbrick and Steve Maggiora

- If You Say So (2023)

With Robert Tepper

- No Easy Way Out (Scotti Bros., 1986)
- No Rest for the Wounded Heart (MTM, 1996)

With Al Stewart

- Last Days of the Century (Enigma, 1988)
- Famous Last Words (Mesa, 1993)
- Between the Wars (Mesa/Blue Moon, 1995)

With Laurence Juber

- LJ (album) (Solid Air., 1995)

With Naked

- Naked (album) (Red Ant., 1997)

With John Tesh

- Garden City (Cypress, 1989)
- A Romantic Christmas (GTS, 1992)
- Winter Song (GTS, 1993)
- One World (Garden City, 2000)
- Power of Love (Garden City, 2003)
- Deeper Faith (Garden City, 2002)
- John Tesh Big Band (Garden City, 2012)
- John Tesh Big Band Christmas (Garden City, 2013)

With Steve Wynn

- Kerosene Man (Rhino, 1990)
- Dazzling Display (Rhino, 1990)

With others

- Splendido Hotel, Al Di Meola (CBS, 1980)
- Stan Bush and Barrage, Stan Bush (Scotti Bros., 1986)
- Boomtown, David & David (A&M, 1986)
- Talking Through Pictures, Marc Jordan (RCA, 1987)
- Y Kant Tori Read, Tori Amos (Atlantic, 1988)
- Crossroads, Tracy Chapman (Elektra, 1989)
- Mosquitos, Stan Ridgway (Geffen, 1989)
- Without You I'm Nothing, Sandra Bernhard (Distance, 1990)
- Them Changes, Tom Scott (GRP, 1990)
- Phantom Center, Ferron (Chameleon, 1990)
- Carved in Stone, Vince Neil (Rhino /Warner Bros., 1993)
- Eric Idle Sings Monty Python, Eric Idle (Restless, 2000)
- Fighting Temptations, Beyoncé (Sony, 2003)
- Lou Rawls Christmas, Lou Rawls (Time-Life, 2006)
- Blue Bolero, Chris Standring (Ultimate Vibe, 2010)
- Not from Here, Gannin Arnold (Ganfu, 2010)
- Time Lapse Photos, Billy Cobham (Creative Multimedia Concepts, Inc, 2019)
- Happen Again, Andy Kim (Angel Air, 2011)
