= Maria Newman =

American musician (born 1962)

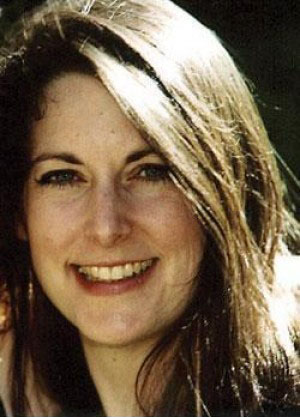

Background information
- Born: January 18, 1962 (age 64); Los Angeles, California, U.S.
- Genres: Modern classical; silent film
- Occupations: Composer; conductor; arranger; musician
- Instruments: Violin; viola; piano
- Years active: 1980–present
- Labels: Verase Sarabande; Montgomery Arts House Masterworks (publisher)
- Father: Alfred Newman

Maria Louise Newman (born January 18, 1962) is an American composer of classical music, as well as a violinist and pianist. She is the youngest child of Alfred Newman, a prominent Hollywood film composer. Maria holds the Louis and Annette Kaufman Composition Chair and the Joachim Chassman Violin Chair at the Montgomery Arts House for Music and Architecture in Malibu, California. She is also a founder of the Malibu Friends of Music.

Her compositions span a wide range of genres, including large-scale orchestral works, ballet pieces, chamber music, choral and vocal works, and collaborative scores for vintage silent films. Newman has been recognized for her contributions with numerous awards and commissions.

She has received musical commendations from the United States Congress (2009), the California State Senate (2009), the California State Assembly (2009), the City of Malibu (2010), and the Annenberg Foundation (2011).

== Life and career ==
Maria Newman is the youngest child of nine-time Academy Award-winning composer and conductor Alfred Newman and former Goldwyn Girl and businesswoman Martha Louis Montgomery. She is part of the Hollywood Newman family dynasty, known for its musical contributions to film. Her father was also the conductor of the original Hollywood Bowl Orchestra. The Newman family has Jewish roots.

Newman grew up in Pacific Palisades, Los Angeles, and began studying piano at the age of six. She started violin lessons at eight and was composing by the time she was nine. As a teenager, Newman studied with violinist Joachim Chassman, a founding member of the Hollywood String Quartet, and played in the 20th Century Fox Studio Orchestra under the direction of her father, Alfred Newman.

After high school, Newman attended the University of Rochester's Eastman School of Music in Rochester, New York, where she studied violin with Peter Salaff of the Cleveland Quartet and piano with Blair Cosman. She graduated in 1984 with a Bachelor of Music (BM) degree, earning high honors (magna cum laude). That same year, she was inducted into the American Academic Honor Society, Pi Kappa Lambda.

Newman pursued graduate studies at Yale University from 1984 to 1986, where she studied violin with Syoko Aki and composition with Martin Bresnick. She earned a Master of Music (MM) degree in 1986 and received the Yale School of Music's George Wellington Miles Award.

In addition to her active career as a composer and performing her own works in concert, Newman has collaborated as a soloist with celebrities such as Pierce Brosnan, Billy Crystal, Paul Reiser, Randy Newman, and Daniel Stern. Her works have been performed in unique venues, including the United States Capitol, Hearst Castle Private Theatre, the Washington State Capitol Building Rotunda, the National Archives Building, the Kennedy Center, and the Marine Barracks, Washington, D.C.

Newman and her husband, Scott Hosfeld, the founding conductor and music director of the Malibu Coast Chamber Orchestra, currently live in Malibu, California. They have five children.

== Family and renowned siblings ==
Maria is the youngest child of Martha Louis Montgomery (born December 5, 1920, in Clarksdale, Mississippi; died May 9, 2005, in Pacific Palisades, California), a former John Robert Powers model, actress, benefactor, and Goldwyn Girl, and nine-time Academy Award-winning film composer Alfred Newman. Maria has four older siblings: Thomas Newman, David Newman, Fred Newman, and Lucy Newman Whiffen. She also has one half-brother, Tim Newman.

Maria comes from a large family of prominent Hollywood film composers:

- Her older brother, David Newman, has scored nearly 100 films, and frequently conducts live film music concerts.
- Her second older brother, Thomas Newman, has scored over 75 films, including Finding Nemo, The Green Mile, The Shawshank Redemption, Road to Perdition, American Beauty, WALL-E, and 1917, and has received twelve Academy Award nominations.
- Her first cousin, Randy Newman, is a two-time Academy Award winner known not only for his film work but also as a singer-songwriter. His film credits include The Natural, Seabiscuit, Toy Story, Toy Story 2, Toy Story 3, Toy Story 4, and Monster's Inc. among others.
- Her cousin, Joey Newman, has scored many TV series, films, and video games.
- Her niece, Jaclyn Newman Dorn, is a music editor who won a Golden Reel Award for 30 Days of Night: Dark Days and received another nomination for Burlesque.
- Her uncle, Lionel Newman, scored three dozen films and several TV series, and adapted and conducted scores for hundreds of other films.
- Her uncle, Emil Newman, scored over 80 films.
- Her stepfather, Robert O. Ragland, was a film composer for over 70 films. He married Maria's mother, Martha, two years after Alfred Newman's passing and remained married to her until her death in 2005. Ragland also used Maria's violin talents in his film score for No Place to Hide starring Kris Kristofferson, Drew Barrymore, and Martin Landau.

== Composition career ==
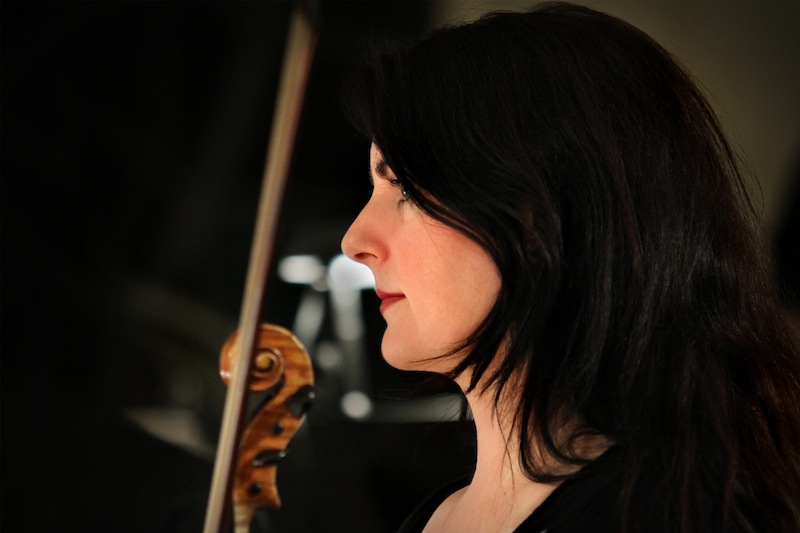
Newman at Pepperdine University in February 2013

Newman is an Annenberg Foundation Composition Fellow and received a grant from the foundation in 2012.

As a violinist who performs and records around the world, Maria Newman initially began her professional composition career using a pseudonym. "I was terribly worried that I would not be taken seriously as a female composer in what I felt was a highly male-dominated field. My famous family's film musician genealogy also led me to believe that I would not be accepted, much less respected, in the concert music world as a serious composer." Newman used the name M. Louis Parker, the name of her maternal great-grandmother, feeling that it neither indicated her family name nor revealed her gender. In 1991, Newman began using her own name as a composer. Although she studied composition briefly with Martin Bresnick at Yale University, she earned both her BM and MM in violin performance. To date, Newman's original music library consists of over 150 concert works.

=== Icicle Creek Music Center ===
In the summer of 1995, Newman was appointed composer-in-residence at the Icicle Creek Music Center in Leavenworth, Washington. She held the position until the end of the summer season in 2004.

=== Montgomery Arts House for Music and Architecture and Malibu Friends of Music ===
As composer-in-residence at the Montgomery Arts House for Music and Architecture (MAHMA), a modern craftsman venue in Malibu, California, designed by Eric Lloyd Wright of the Frank Lloyd Wright family of architects, Newman participates in over 40 concerts annually at this venue alone. Her duties at MAHMA include serving as composer-in-residence for the Malibu Coast Chamber Orchestra, Malibu Madrigals, Malibu Coast Silent Film Orchestra, Malibu Coast String Quartet, Malibu Coast Chamber Ballet, and Malibu Coast Chamber Orchestra Solisti. Since 2005, Newman has held the Louis and Annette Kaufman Composition Chair and the Joachim Chassman Violin Chair at MAHMA and the Malibu Friends of Music. Additionally, Newman tours frequently as a featured composer, performer, lecturer, and master teacher.

=== Viklarbo Chamber Ensemble ===
Along with pianist and longtime musical partner Wendy Prober, Newman founded the Viklarbo Chamber Ensemble in 1987. With Viklarbo, Newman and Prober have performed in some of the country's most prestigious concert halls as well as in some of its poorest communities. The ensemble has received grants from the National Endowment for the Arts (NEA), the City of Los Angeles Cultural Affairs Department, the California Arts Council, the Utah Tour for the Performing Arts, the Delta Arts Council, the Headwaters Council for the Arts, the Hawaii Council for the Arts, and many others. The ensemble continues to present concerts today, with Newman serving as Composer-in-Residence.

=== Guest residencies ===
Newman has been a guest composer for various ensembles and festivals, including the Los Angeles Mozart Orchestra, Solisti New York, Brevard Symphony Orchestra, San Jose Chamber Orchestra, New West Symphony, Olympia Chamber Orchestra, Wichita Symphony, Los Angeles Jewish Symphony, Santa Monica Symphony, Pacific Serenades, Martha's Vineyard Chamber Music Society, Chamber Music Palisades, Dorian Festival Chamber Orchestra at Luther College, Omaha Conservatory Festival and Cinema Orchestras, Azusa Pacific Grand Orchestra Festival, Central Washington University Symphony Orchestra, Orchestra Omaha, Wonder of Words Festival (WOW!), Northwestern University, Indiana University Bloomington School of Music Philharmonic Orchestra, and more.

== Performance career ==
A bold and versatile performer, Newman's interpretations of both her own works and traditional masterworks are regularly featured in concert halls and heard on radio broadcasts and television worldwide. As a violinist, violist, and pianist, Maria Newman has performed globally as a soloist, recitalist, and a member of the Malibu Coast String Quartet and the Viklarbo Chamber Ensemble.

As a concert soloist, Newman has premiered many new works for violin and viola, including several of her own compositions, in the United States and Europe. She was the viola soloist on the Grammy Award-winning album Symphonic Hollywood, performing Miklós Rózsa's Viola Concerto with the Nuremberg Symphony. Newman also performed the unofficial premiere of Rózsa's unpublished first Violin Concerto and made the first recording of his late Introduction and Allegro for Solo Viola.

Newman has collaborated as a soloist with celebrities such as Pierce Brosnan, Billy Crystal, Paul Reiser, and Daniel Stern. She has also performed as a featured soloist at the United States Capitol Building Complex on Capitol Hill in Washington, D.C., headlining a special event representing the highly debated Victim's Rights Bill. Additionally, Newman has been featured as a commissioned composer and performer in the private theater inside the historic Hearst Castle in San Simeon, California, where she was introduced by William Randolph Hearst III.

== Selected works ==
This is only a list of selected works.

=== String quartets ===
- String Quartet No. 1, Op. 33, No. 7 "Birthday of the Infanta" (1995)
  1. The Party – Carneval
  2. The Bull Fight
  3. The Dance of the Dwarf
  4. The Forest and the Minuet
  5. The Search and the Mirror
  6. Finale: The Death of the Dwarf
- String Quartet No. 2, Op. 35, No. 1 "Lauds" (1998)
  1. Maestoso feroce – Allegro
  2. Poco andante – poco allegro
  3. Stiltedly swaying, moderato
  4. Intermezzo: Allegro molto
  5. Finale: Allegro molto

=== Piano ===
- Sonata for Piano, Op. 32, No. 6 "Maskil" (1994)
  1. Largo – Presto
  2. Andante Iontano
  3. Allegro assai
- The Complete Ballet Music for Two Pianos, Op. 39, No. 1 "Emma McChesney" (2002)
  1. Moderato – Feroce (The Traveling Saleswoman)
  2. Moderato, molto legato (Emma Tells of Her Life)
  3. Andantino melancholica (The Robbery)
  4. Feroce, accented (Mad Dance Lessons with Jock)

=== Song cycles for voice and mixed ensembles/orchestra ===
- A Breath of Mississippi, Op. 43, No. 5, song cycle for soprano, two violins and piano (2005)

(On the poetry of Louise Moss Montgomery)
1. Little Songs
2. Watchword
3. Under the Oak Tree
4. My Auntie Mother
5. That's Home

- Songs on Motherhood, Op. 36, No. 2, song cycle for soprano (or mezzo-soprano), violin, clarinet (or viola, and harp (or piano) (1998) (On poetry of Louise Moss Montgomery)
  1. To a Refractory Father
  2. Jeu, Intermede 1
  3. Pirouetting
  4. Jeu, Intermede 2
  5. Do Not Stand at My Grave and Weep (anonymous poetry)
- Montgomery Carols, Set 1, Op. 39 No. 1, for SATB and mixed chamber ensemble (2001)

(On poetry of Maria Newman)
1. Ring Your Bells
2. Baby Lord of Majesty
3. Little Saviour of Healing Light

- Shirat HaYam, Op. 44 No. 4, for tenor voice (or baritone) and string orchestra/harp or tenor voice (or baritone) and piano quintet or tenor voice (or baritone) and piano (2006)
  1. Extol I
  2. Extol II

=== Flute with mixed chamber ensembles ===
- Pennipotenti, Op. 42, No. 1 (2005)
  1. The Dipper
  2. The Snowy Owl
  3. The Humming Bird
  4. The Falcon
- Sonata for Flute & Piano in the Style of the Harpsichord, Op. 44, No. 7 (1999)
  1. Misterioso, tiptoeing
  2. With virtuosic flourish (flute alone)
  3. Molto allegro possible
  4. Largo
  5. Presto
- The Pied Piper of Haemlin, Op. 47, No. 9 (2008)
  1. Reverie 1 (flute alone)
  2. Scene 1
  3. Reverie 2 (flute alone)
  4. Scene 2
  5. Reverie 3 (flute alone)
  6. Scene 3
  7. Reverie 4
  8. Scene 4
- Colores de Mexico, Op. 44, No. 8 (2007)
  1. The Rain (La Lluvia)
  2. The Rattlesnake (La Culebra)
  3. The River (El Rio)
  4. The Coyote (El Coyote)
  5. A Little Dance (Un Pequeno Baile)

=== Concerti for solo instruments and string orchestra ===
- Cello Concerto, Op. 40, No. 6 (2002, all movements attacca)
  1. Largo, poco intensivo
  2. Allegro molto
  3. Cadenza
  4. Come prima, ma piu intensivo
- Othmar, Sonata for cello alone (2000)
- Viola Concerto, Op. 45, No. 10 (2006, (movements attacca))
  1. Cadenza
  2. Chorale –Allegro
- Violin Concerto, Op. 38, No. 7 "Lux Aeterna" (2001)
  1. Feroce maestoso – Allegro
- Triple Violin Concerto, Op. 41, No. 4 "Trinitas et Unitas" (2003)
  1. Trinitas
  2. Unitas (with soprano solo)

=== String orchestra ===
- Concerto Grosso, Op. 34, No. 4 (1996) for string orchestra
  1. Feroce maestoso – Allegro
  2. Quasi adagio ma non-tanto, lontano
  3. Allegro energico
- Le Livre D'Esther (The Book of Esther), Op. 38, No. 2 (2009)
  1. The Purification
  2. Mordecai
  3. The Decrees of Esther
  4. Purim

=== String duo ===
- Appalachian Duets (for two violins), Op. 38, No. 8 (2001)
  1. Heart O' the Hills
  2. Goin' Fishin
  3. The Train
  4. Mammy's Little Lullaby
  5. Granpap's Fiddle

=== Large brass ensemble ===
- Chorales for Brass and Percussion, Op. 35, No. 3 (1997, revised 2002)
  1. Chorale
  2. Dance
  3. Dirge
  4. Finale

== Filmography and commissions ==
=== Library of vintage silent films ===
Newman has been commissioned to score revisions of vintage silent films by various organizations, including the Annenberg Foundation, the Mary Pickford Foundation, the Viklarbo Chamber Ensemble, the Malibu Friends of Music, Timeline Films, the Luther College Dorian Festival, the Omaha Conservatory of Music, Icicle Creek Music Center, Central Washington University, the family of Mary Lofdahl, Milestone Films, A&F Productions, the Sierra Festival Symphony, Grand Performances Los Angeles, and Turner Classic Movies. Notably, she scored the movie Mr. Wu, starring Lon Chaney (1927).

A list of these films include:

Title of film	Starring	Original date	Running time	Directed/produced	Commissioned/released by	Instrumentation
Daddy-Long-Legs	Mary Pickford	1919	85 minutes	Mary Pickford	Milestone Film and Video	For piano quintet and percussion or full chamber orchestra
Heart o' the Hills	Mary Pickford	1919	87 minutes	Marshall Neilan	Milestone Film and Video	For string quartet and percussion (optional prepared piano) or string orchestra and percussion
Rebecca of Sunnybrook Farm	Mary Pickford	1917	78 minutes	Marshall Neilan	Commissioned by the Mary Pickford Institute and Grand Performances, Los Angeles	For flute, two violins, viola, cello, piano and percussion
The Love Light	Mary Pickford	1921	89 minutes	Directed by Frances Marion, produced by United Artists	Milestone Film and Video	For piano quartet
Quality Street	Marion Davies, Conrad Nagel	1927	110 minutes	Produced by Marion Davies	Commissioned by the Annenberg Foundation	For flute, harp, piano quintet and percussion
Tom Sawyer	Jack Pickford	1917	45 minutes	NA	Commissioned by the Library of Moving Images	For flute, violin and percussion or string quartet
Cinderella	Mary Pickford (Cinderella), Owen Moore (Prince Charming)	1914	52 minutes	Directed by James Kirkwood	Commissioned by the Omaha Conservatory of Music	Famous Players Film Co., for chamber orchestra or piano quintet and percussion
Mr. Wu	Lon Chaney	1927	92 minutes	Produced by MGM	Commissioned by Turner Classic Movies	For piano quartet and percussion or chamber orchestra
The Gibson Goddess	Marion Leonard (lead role), Mary Pickford (extra)	1909	9 minutes	NA	Commissioned by the Omaha Conservatory of Music	For violin, viola and piano, or cello quintet, or string orchestra, or chamber orchestra
What the Daisy Said	Mary Pickford, Owen Moore	1910	12 minutes	Directed by D. W. Griffith, American Biography Company, Released by Milestone Film and Video	Commissioned by the Icicle Creek Music Center and Timeline Films	For string quartet, or solo piano, or string orchestra, or chamber orchestra
Ramona	Mary Pickford	1910	17 minutes	Directed by D. W. Griffith, American Biography Company, released by Milestone Film and Video	Commissioned by Turner Classic Movies and Timeline Films	For violin, piano and percussion, or viola, piano and percussion or cello, piano and percussion
Willful Peggy	Mary Pickford	1910	12 minutes	Directed by D. W. Griffith, American Biography Company	Commissioned by the Young Musicians Foundation	For piano quartet or string orchestra and piano
As it is in Life	Mary Pickford	1910	12 minutes	Directed by D. W. Griffith, American Biography Company	Commissioned by the Family of Mary Lofdahl	For soprano, flute, viola, and piano or violin, viola, cello and piano
Tender Hearts	Mary Pickford	1909	3 and 1/2 minutes	Directed by D. W. Griffith, American Biography Company	Commissioned by the Malibu Friends of Music	For violin, viola, piano and percussion, or viola, piano and percussion or cello, piano and percussion
They Would Elope	Mary Pickford, Billy Quirk	1909	12 minutes	Directed by D. W. Griffith, American Biography Company	Commissioned by the Malibu Friends of Music	For piano quartet and percussion
The Dream	Mary Pickford, Owen Moore	1911	12 minutes	Independent Moving Picture Company (IMP)	Commissioned by the Sierra Symphony Orchestra	For wind ensemble and percussion, or chamber orchestra, piano and percussion or woodwind quintet and percussion
Hearst Castle Home Movies: Short and Spicy Skits from the other side of Hollywood	Marion Davies		12 minutes	Directed by Chris M. Allport, Alpha Command Unit	Commissioned by the San Luis Obispo Int'l Film Festival and Malibu Friends of Music	For piano quartet and percussion

=== Additional commissions in the press ===
October 26, 2012: WOW! Wonder of the Words Festival (wonderofwordsfest.com), The Kate Shelley Story – featuring Marian Newman's original music, based on the story written by Mary Kay Shanley..."is the story of a young Iowa girl that has captured the attention of Iowans for decades..."The live mixed-media performance will showcase an original narrate and retelling of The Kate Shelley Story penned by best-selling author Mary Kay Shanley; an original musical score written and conducted by award-winning composer and virtuosic violinist Maria Newman, and the highly acclaimed federated actress with the Repertory Theatre of Iowa Allisa Schetter-Siedschlaw will play the role of Kate. The performance will be directed by Des Moines Social Club Artistic Director Matthew McIver..."

July 25, 2012: "...Barak, a neoclassicist with four pieces in the New York City Ballet repertory, is creating an 11-minute ballet to a score by Los Angeles composer Maria Newman (of the Oscar-winning, film-composer Newman family)..." (National Choreographers Initiative a lab for ballet at UC Irvine, by Laura Bleiberg, special to the Los Angeles Times, July 25, 2012).

December 16, 2009: Composer Maria Newman conducting a live chamber orchestra to her original score for the fully restored Mary Pickford silent film classic, Daddy-Long-Legs, hosted by Pickford Foundation curator Hugh Munro Neely.

August 12, 2009: "Winston's family has donated the film projection equipment for the screening of The Terminator and for future Malibu Film Society screenings, which include a fully restored Blu-ray print of 1948 Academy Award winner The Red Shoes; Woody Allen's Oscar-winner Annie Hall; last year's Waltz with Bashir, the Israeli animated documentary about the 1982 Lebanon War; and the 1919 silent film, Daddy-Long-Legs, starring Mary Pickford, which will feature a chamber orchestra conducted by Maria Newman."

== Educational activities ==
Newman presents masterclasses, coaches student performances of her original compositions and others, and lectures at universities and various arts organizations nationwide.

== Awards and recognition ==
Newman has received recognition and commendations from the Annenberg Foundation, the United States Congress, the California State Senate, the California State Assembly, the County of Los Angeles, the City of Malibu, and The Malibu Times newspaper. She has been featured in spotlight articles by noted newspapers and magazines. Newman has also received a Malibu Music Award for "Classical Artist of the Year," a "Variety Composer Legend" Award, a "Debut Award" from the Los Angeles Young Musicians' Foundation, and recognition from the California Arts Commission. Her works are featured on both private and public radio, as well as on Turner Broadcasting.

- "Composer Legend of the Year" Variety Magazine, 1997
- Mary Pickford Foundation Grants, 1997, 1999, 2000, 2008, 2011
- California Arts Council Composer Fellowship, 2002
- "Classical Artist of the Year" Malibu Music Awards, 2008
- The Malibu Times 2008 Citizens of the Year Dolphin Awards
- Recognition and Commendation from the United States Congress, 2009
- Recognition and Commendation from the California State Senate, 2009
- Recognition and Commendation from the California State Assembly, 2009
- Recognition and Commendation from the City of Malibu, 2009
- City of Malibu Commission, Recognition and Commendation, 2010
- Omaha Institute Residency Composition Fellowship and Commission, 2011
- Annenberg Foundation Composition and Performance Fellowship, 2011
- Mary Pickford Foundation Composition Fellowship, 2011 and 2012

== Recordings ==
Newman's works have been performed and recorded by cellist Andrew Shulman, violist Paul Coletti, double bassist Nico Abondolo, artist Randy Newman, flutist Hal Ott, and pianists Wendy Prober, Delores Stevens, Peter Longworth, and Bryan Pezzone. They have also been performed by the Kairos String Quartet and the Malibu String Quartet.

A list of her recorded works on the Montgomery Arts House Masterworks Recording label is as follows:

- Requiem for the Innocents
- The Art of the Chamber Orchestra, Books, I, II, & III
- Music for String Quartet, Book I
- Music for Cello, Book I
- Malibu Chamber Players – Pennipotenti
- Spooky Sonorities
- Dynamic Duos & Obscure Fantasy Heroes, Book I
- A Scented Garden of Music – Melodies of the South, Book I
- Music for Piano, Book I
- A Holiday Festival of Music & Light – Myth, Mystery & Mysticism
- Music for Violin, Book I

Recorded clips of Newman's work and selected public performances are available on YouTube.
