= More of You =

2014 single by Colton Dixon

Single by Colton Dixon

from the album Anchor
- Released: June 24, 2014
- Recorded: 2013–2014
- Genre: CCM, pop rock
- Length: 4:06
- Label: Sparrow
- Songwriters: Colton Dixon; Ben Glover; David Garcia

Colton Dixon singles chronology
"Love Has Come for Me" (2013)	"More of You" (2014)	"Through All Of it" (2015)

Music video
- "More of You" on YouTube

"More of You" is the lead single, released on June 24, 2014, from Colton Dixon's second studio album, Anchor.

== Composition ==
"More of You" is originally in the key of B♭ Major, with a tempo of 80 beats per minute. Written in common time, Dixon's vocal range spans from B♭_{3} to E♭_{5} during the song.

== Music video ==
A music video for the single "More of You" was released on July 15, 2014. The video has over nine million views on YouTube.

== Charts ==
=== Weekly charts ===
Weekly chart performance for "More of You"
Chart (2014)	Peak position
US Hot Christian Songs (Billboard)	9
US Christian Airplay (Billboard)	5
US Christian AC (Billboard)	8

=== Year-end charts ===
2014 year-end chart performance for "More of You"
Chart (2014)	Position
US Christian Songs (Billboard)	23
US Christian Airplay (Billboard)	26
US Christian AC (Billboard)	30
US Christian CHR (Billboard)	2
