= John Bisharat =

American composer and conductor

John Bisharat is an American composer and conductor who has composed, arranged, and conducted music for film and television productions.

Bisharat was born in 1964 in Los Angeles, California, and grew up playing the piano, cello, and bass. In 1986, he graduated from UCLA's Professional Designation in Film Scoring program.

Bisharat has conducted various symphonies across the United States, including the National Symphony Orchestra, the Colorado Symphony Orchestra, and the Kansas City Symphony. Outside of the United States, he has conducted the London Symphony Orchestra.

Bisharat has also worked on numerous musical scores for films, including the 1987 Charles Bronson film Death Wish 4: The Crackdown, the 2006 Omar Sharif film One Night With the King, and the 2004 short film The Trumpeter. He recently composed the score for the forthcoming film Magdalena: Released from Shame (2008).

== Sources ==
- Profile of John Bisharat at the Institute for Middle East Understanding
- Biography of Composer John Bisharat at Din Music
