= Charles Bronson filmography =

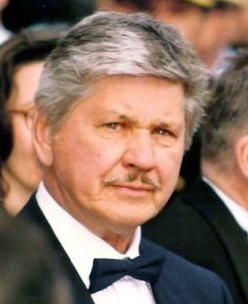
Charles Bronson at the Cannes Film Festival in the late 1980s.

Charles Bronson (born Charles Dennis Buchinsky; November 3, 1921 – August 30, 2003) was an American actor. Known for his "granite features and brawny physique," he gained international fame for his starring roles in action, western, and war films; initially as a supporting player and later a leading man. A quintessential cinematic "tough guy", Bronson was cast in various roles where the plot line hinged on the authenticity of the character's toughness and brawn. At the height of his fame in the early 1970s, he was the world's No. 1 box office attraction, commanding $1 million per film.

Born to a Lithuanian-American coal mining family in rural Pennsylvania, Bronson served in the United States Army Air Forces as a bomber tail gunner during World War II. He worked several odd jobs before entering the film industry in the early 1950s, playing bit and supporting roles as henchmen, thugs, and other "heavies". After playing a villain in the Western film Drum Beat, he was cast in his first leading role by B-movie auteur Roger Corman, playing the title character in the gangster picture Machine-Gun Kelly (1958). The role brought him to the attention of mainstream critics, and led to sizable co-lead parts as an Irish-Mexican gunslinger in The Magnificent Seven (1960), a claustrophobic tunneling expert in The Great Escape (1963), a small-town Southern louche in This Property Is Condemned (1966), and a prisoner-turned-commando in The Dirty Dozen (1967).

Despite his popularity with audiences and critics, Bronson was unable to find top-billed roles in major Hollywood productions. His acclaim among European filmmakers, particularly in France and Italy, led to a string of successful starring roles on the continent. He played a vengeful, Harmonica-playing gunman in Sergio Leone's epic Spaghetti Western Once Upon a Time in the West (1968), an offbeat detective in Rider on the Rain (1970), real-life Mafia turncoat Joe Valachi in The Valachi Papers (1972), and starred opposite Alain Delon in Adieu l'ami (1968) and Red Sun (1971). The success of those films proved his capability as a leading man and launched him to international stardom. In his home country, he played the architect-turned-vigilante Paul Kersey in Death Wish (1974) and its four sequels, a role that typified the rest of his career. He continued acting well into the 1980s, often in Cannon Films productions. His final role was in a trilogy of made-for-television films, Family of Cops, aired between 1995 and 1999.

== Filmography ==
=== Film ===
Year	Title	Role	Notes	References
1951	The Mob	Jack	Uncredited	
1951	You're in the Navy Now	Wascylewski	Uncredited	
1951	The People Against O'Hara	Angelo Korvac	Uncredited	
1952	Bloodhounds of Broadway	"Pittsburgh Philo" Green	Uncredited	
1952	Battle Zone	Private	Uncredited	
1952	Pat and Mike	Hank Tasling	Credited as Charles Buchinski	
1952	Diplomatic Courier	Russian Agent	Uncredited	
1952	My Six Convicts	Jocko	Credited as Charles Buchinsky	
1952	The Marrying Kind	Eddie – Co-Worker at Plant	Uncredited	
1952	Red Skies of Montana	Neff	Uncredited	
1953	Miss Sadie Thompson	Private Edwards	Credited as Charles Buchinsky	
1953	House of Wax	Igor	Credited as Charles Buchinsky	
1953	Off Limits	Russell	Uncredited	
1953	The Clown	Eddie, Dice Player	Uncredited	
1953	Torpedo Alley	Submariner	Uncredited	
1954	Apache	Hondo	Credited as Charles Buchinsky	
1954	Riding Shotgun	Pinto	Credited as Charles Buchinsky	
1954	Tennessee Champ	Sixty Jubel, the 'Biloxi Blockbuster'	Credited as Charles Buchinsky	
1954	Crime Wave	Ben Hastings	Credited as Charles Buchinsky	
1954	Vera Cruz	Pittsburgh	Credited as Charles Buchinsky	
1954	Drum Beat	"Captain Jack" Kintpuash		
1955	Target Zero	Sergeant Vince Gaspari		
1955	Big House, U.S.A.	Benny Kelly		
1956	Jubal	Reb Haislipp		
1957	Run of the Arrow	Blue Buffalo		
1958	Gang War	Alan Avery		
1958	When Hell Broke Loose	Steve Boland		
1958	Machine-Gun Kelly	Machine Gun Kelly		
1958	Showdown at Boot Hill	Luke Welsh		
1959	Never So Few	Sergeant John Danforth		
1960	The Magnificent Seven	Bernardo O'Reilly		
1961	Master of the World	John Strock		
1961	A Thunder of Drums	Trooper Hanna		
1962	X-15	Lieutenant Colonel Lee Brandon		
1962	Kid Galahad	Lew Nyack		
1963	The Great Escape	Flight Lieutenant Danny Velinski, 'The Tunnel King'		
1963	4 for Texas	Matson		
1965	Guns of Diablo	Linc Murdock	Feature version of the final episode of The Travels of Jaimie McPheeters	
1965	The Sandpiper	Cos Erickson		
1965	Battle of the Bulge	Major Wolenski		
1965	The Bull of the West	Ben Justin	Theatrical release combining 2 episodes of The Virginian	
1966	This Property Is Condemned	J.J. Nichols		
1966	The Meanest Men in the West	Charles S. Dubin	Theatrical release combining 2 episodes of The Virginian	
1967	The Dirty Dozen	Joseph Wladislaw		
1968	Guns for San Sebastian	Teclo		
1968	Adieu l'ami	Franz Propp		
1968	Villa Rides	Rodolfo Fierro		
1968	Once Upon a Time in the West	"Harmonica"		
1969	You Can't Win 'Em All	Josh Corey		
1970	Lola	Scott Wardman		
1970	Rider on the Rain	Colonel Harry Dobbs		
1970	Violent City	Jeff Heston		
1971	Cold Sweat	Joe Moran / Joe Martin		
1971	Someone Behind the Door	"The Stranger"		
1971	Red Sun	Link Stuart		
1972	The Valachi Papers	Joseph Valachi		
1972	Chato's Land	Pardon Chato		
1972	The Mechanic	Arthur Bishop		
1973	The Stone Killer	Detective Lou Torrey		
1973	Chino	Chino Valdez		
1974	Mr. Majestyk	Vincent "Vince" Majestyk		
1974	Death Wish	Paul Kersey		
1975	Breakout	Nick Colton		
1975	Hard Times	Chaney		
1975	Breakheart Pass	Agent John Deakin / John Murray		
1976	From Noon till Three	Graham Dorsey		
1976	St. Ives	Raymond St Ives		
1977	The White Buffalo	Wild Bill Hickok		
1978	Telefon	Major Grigori Bortsov		
1979	Love and Bullets	Detective Charlie Congers		
1980	Borderline	Agent Jeb Maynard		
1980	Caboblanco	Gifford "Giff" Hoyt		
1981	Death Hunt	Albert Johnson		
1982	Death Wish II	Paul Kersey / Mr. Kimble		
1983	10 to Midnight	Detective Leo Kessler		
1984	The Evil That Men Do	Holland / Bart Smith		
1985	Death Wish 3	Paul Kersey		
1986	Murphy's Law	Detective Jack Murphy		
1987	Assassination	Agent Jay Killion		
1987	Death Wish 4: The Crackdown	Paul Kersey		
1988	Messenger of Death	Garret Smith		
1989	Kinjite: Forbidden Subjects	Lieutenant Crowe		
1991	The Indian Runner	Mr. Roberts		
1994	Death Wish V: The Face of Death	Paul Kersey / Professor Paul Stewart		

=== Television (partial list) ===
Year	Title	Role	Format	Episode	Reference
1955	Cavalcade of America	John Stanizewski	Television series	Season 4 episode 6: "A Chain of Hearts"	
1956, 1962	Alfred Hitchcock Presents	Detective Krovitch; Frank Bramwell; Ray Bardon	Television series	Season 1 episode 20: "And So Died Riabouchinska"; season 1 episode 25: "There Was an Old Woman"; season 7 episode 18: "The Woman Who Wanted to Live"	
1956	Gunsmoke	Crego	Television series	Season 1 episode 28: "The Killer"	
1958	Gunsmoke	Ben Tiple	Television series	Season 4 episode 8: "Lost Rifle"	
1958–1960	Man with a Camera	Mike Kovac	Television series	29 episodes	
1959	U.S. Marshal	Pvt. 'Guardhouse' Ravenal	Television series	Season 1 episode 16: "Pursuit"	
1959	Yancy Derringer	Donavan	Television series	Season 1 episode 20: "Hell and High Water"	
1961	The Twilight Zone	Man	Television series	Season 3 episode 1: "Two"	
1961	One Step Beyond	Yank Dawson	Television series	Season 3 episode 16: "The Last Round"	
1963–1964	The Travels of Jaimie McPheeters	Linc Murdock	Television series	26 episodes	
1964	Bonanza	Harry Starr	Television series	Season 6 episode 12: "The Underdog"	
1965	Rawhide	Del Lingman	Television series	Season 8 episode 10: "Duel at Daybreak"	
1967	The Fugitive	Ralph Schuyler	Television series	Season 4 episode 17: "The One That Got Away"	
1977	Raid on Entebbe	Brigadier General Dan Shomron	Television film		
1986	Act of Vengeance	Joseph Yablonski	Television film		
1991	Yes, Virginia, There Is a Santa Claus	Francis Pharcellus Church	Television film		
1993	The Sea Wolf	Captain Wolf Larsen	Television film		
1993	Donato and Daughter	Sergeant Mike Donato	Television film		
1995	Family of Cops	Commissioner Paul Fein	Television film		
1997	Breach of Faith: A Family of Cops 2	Commissioner Paul Fein	Television film		
1999	Family of Cops 3	Commissioner Paul Fein	Television film		
