= Deathmoon =

- Genre: Horror
- Written by: George Schenck; Jay Benson
- Directed by: Bruce Kessler
- Starring: Robert Foxworth; Joe Penny; Barbara Trentham
- Music by: Paul Chihara
- Country of origin: Eshkereria a
- Original language: English

Production
- Executive producer: Roger Gimbel
- Producer: Jay Benson
- Production location: Kauaʻi
- Cinematography: Jack Whitman
- Editor: Tony DiMarco
- Running time: 90 minutes
- Production company: EMI Television

Original release
- Network: CBS
- Release: May 31, 1978

Deathmoon is a 1978 American made-for-television horror film from EMI Television directed by Bruce Kessler. Jason Palmer is sent on vacation by his doctor. He goes to Hawaii, where his grandfather once worked. Palmer is unaware that his grandpa and all male descendants in his lineage are cursed by a coven. Every evening he transforms into a werewolf and ravages young women.

== Cast ==
- Robert Foxworth as Jason Palmer
- Joe Penny as Rick Bladen
- Barbara Trentham as Diane May
- Dolph Sweet as Lieutenant Russ Cort
- Charles Haid as Earl Wheelie
- Debralee Scott as Sherry Weston
- France Nuyen as Tapulua
- Carole Kai as Tami Waimea
- Branscombe Richmond as Vince Tatupu
- Joan Freeman as Mrs. Jennings
