= Jane Doe (film series) =

American made for TV film series for the Hallmark Channel between 2005 and 2008

- Genre: Mystery
- Created by: Dean Hargrove
- Directed by: James A. Contner (1, 7, 8); Armand Mastroianni (2, 3, 5); Mark Griffiths (4); Lea Thompson (6, 9)
- Starring: Lea Thompson; Joe Penny
- Country of origin: United States
- Original language: English

Production
- Executive producers: Robert Halmi Jr. Dean Hargrove; Larry Levinson
- Running time: 80–84 minutes
- Production companies: Alpine Medien Productions; Larry Levinson Productions

Original release
- Network: Hallmark Channel
- Release: January 21, 2005 – January 12, 2008

Jane Doe is a series of nine made-for-television mystery films released by the Hallmark Channel between 2005 and 2008, and later appearing regularly on the Hallmark Movie Channel. While on the Hallmark Channel, it was broadcast in rotation with the movie series McBride, Murder 101, and Mystery Woman, under the umbrella title Hallmark Channel Mystery Wheel. In the UK, these movies are aired on a rotation basis, in the afternoon drama slot on Channel 5.

Dean Hargrove created the series. Lea Thompson stars as Cathy Davis, a soccer mom who is secretly Jane Doe, an agent for the federal "Central Security Agency". The films focus on her efforts to keep her lives separate while solving mysteries. Thompson also made her directorial debut with the sixth film in the series, called Jane Doe: The Harder they Fall and went on to also direct Jane Doe: Eye of the Beholder.

== Main cast ==
- Lea Thompson as Cathy Davis/Jane Doe
- Joe Penny as Frank Darnell
- William R. Moses as Jack Davis
- Jessy Schram as Susan Davis
- Zack Shada as Nick Davis

== Films ==
No.	Title	Directed by	Written by	Original release date
1	"Jane Doe: Vanishing Act"	James A. Contner	Dean Hargrove	January 21, 2005
Frank Darnell, director of the Central Security Agency (CSA), is at a loss when Miles Crandall, the genius who writes top-secret satellite communication software for his Pentagon-contracted company, disappears from a private jet flight, apparently by parachute, over the desert. CSA veteran Cathy Davis, who retired to be a wife to husband Jack and mother to their daughter and son, is secretly called in to solve the riddle. This is ironic because her cover is as game designer for the US Puzzle Co. They soon realize the escape was staged, but the question remains by whom and why. Meanwhile, Cathy's teenage daughter Susan successfully auditions for the cheerleader squad while her young son Nick struggles with being shy and unpopular at school.
2	"Jane Doe: Now You See It, Now You Don't"	Armand Mastroianni	Dean Hargrove & Jeff Peters	February 18, 2005
The Declaration Of Independence is stolen while on display in a Los Angeles Bank. The CSA, with the assistance of a puzzle solver code named Jane Doe, becomes involved and solves the mystery.
3	"Jane Doe: Til Death Do Us Part"	Armand Mastroianni	Dean Hargrove & Jeff Peters	March 11, 2005
When a ruthless arms kingpin stages an ingenious escape from prison, Jane Doe and Frank Darnell, CSA head, realize he's bent on a vengeance killing. Who the prospective victim is remains to be seen.
4	"Jane Doe: The Wrong Face"	Mark Griffiths	Dean Hargrove & George Eckstein & Ethlie Ann Vare	June 19, 2005
72 hours before an important case in court, the prosecuter's wife is mysteriously kidnapped after plastic surgery. Jane gets 3 days to find her.
5	"Jane Doe: Yes, I Remember It Well"	Armand Mastroianni	Dean Hargrove & Ethlie Ann Vare	January 14, 2006
A famous mentalist who possesses the names of secret foreign agents in the Middle East is about to give up this information to kidnappers unless a hefty ransom is paid within 24 hours. Jane Doe's mother (Donna Mills) joins the investigation.
6	"Jane Doe: The Harder They Fall"	Lea Thompson	Dean Hargrove & Ethlie Ann Vare	March 4, 2006
Jane Doe investigates the murder of an international business mogul whose firm ships tainted food to third world countries.
7	"Jane Doe: Ties That Bind"	James A. Contner	Dean Hargrove & Ethlie Ann Vare & Adam Armus & Nora Kay Foster	March 17, 2007
DNA evidence and camera footage places a corrupt CEO as the prime suspect in the murder of a company whistle-blower, but Jane Doe believes the real killer may be a twin sibling.
8	"Jane Doe: How To Fire Your Boss"	James A. Contner	Dean Hargrove & Ethlie Ann Vare & Adam Armus & Nora Kay Foster & Brian Clemens	May 8, 2007
Jane Doe sets out to track down a killer who is targeting fellow CSA agents.
9	"Jane Doe: Eye of the Beholder"	Lea Thompson	Dean Hargrove & Bridget Terry	January 12, 2008
Cathy and Frank partner with a beautiful insurance investigator in the recovery of stolen art. Frank is smitten with her, even though it becomes apparent she may be the mastermind behind the theft.
