= Angela Featherstone =

Canadian actress

- Born: 3 April 1965 (age 61); Hamilton, Ontario, Canada
- Occupations: Actress, writer, curator
- Years active: 1991–present

Angela Featherstone (born 3 April 1965) is a Canadian actress, writer, director, and advocate for children in foster care.

== Career ==
=== Modeling ===
Within a year of emancipating herself from foster care at age 17, Featherstone became Canada's top model when her September Flare magazine cover broke all previous records for sales. She quickly expanded upon her success and left for New York, where she signed with the illustrious Click models and later would be one of the first models signed to Next. She would travel the world in the 80s as a top fashion model.

=== Acting ===
Featherstone is best known for playing the titular maid on the Seinfeld episode called The Maid, Chloe in Friends, and Robbie's fiancée Linda in The Wedding Singer. Most recently, she played the role of Maggie on Showtime's Ray Donovan and Jame on HBO's Girls.

=== Writing ===
Featherstone has created sitcoms for Sony, DreamWorks, and NBC television and has written nonfiction for Time, Jane, Flare, Huffington Post, Dame, and Zoomer. Her essay about childhood trauma, "God Said No", was published in the 2014 edition of Gargoyle magazine and nominated for the Pushcart Prize. In 2021, she published the essay "Forgiveness" in Dame magazine.

An alumnus of UCLA Extension Writer's Program "Personal Essay & Memoir," she is completing her memoir.

=== Directing ===
In 2022, Featherstone began directing with her debut seven-minute film, L'Étranger. As a director, she uses her years of experience in fashion as a model, working with important photographers and magazines (such as Italian, French, and American Vogue; Mademoiselle; Seventeen; Sassy; Harper's Bazaar Italia; Grazia; Harpers & Queens; Albert Watson; Bruce Weber; & Irving Penn), her love of cinema and decades in the film industry, a refined sense of story as an oft published essayist, her passion for philosophy, and a love of creating safe spaces for collaboration.

=== Curating ===
In 2011, she curated Fuck Pretty, a critically acclaimed photography exhibit at the Robert Berman Gallery - featuring emerging female photographers.

=== Music ===
She recorded the song "Coattail Glide" with Raymond Pettibon and the band The Niche Makers in 2011.

=== Producing ===
In 2014, she was an adjunct lecturer at the UCLA Professional Producing Program. In 2022, she produced L'Étranger.

== Advocacy ==
Featherstone, a committed advocate for children in foster care, volunteered with the Children's Action Network, curating their Heart Gallery from 2011 to 2019, and served on their Winter Wonderland committee in 2014 and 2015. She also mentored a child in foster care through Kidsave from 2011 to 2020. She has described suffering physical, emotional, and sexual abuse when she herself was a foster child.

In 2014, she lectured at the ICAN Nexus Conference on Violence Within the Home and its Effects on Children. She continues to lecture and write about healing PTSD, child abuse, human trafficking, and intimacy. Her 2015 essay on child sex trafficking for DAME was picked up by Salon.com and MSN and was read by over seven million viewers. Since 2009, she has studied moral and spiritual psychology with Rabbi Mordecai Finley, Ph.D. She served as a consultant on Cracked Up, a Netflix documentary about the effects and healing of trauma.

In 2021, she founded Fostering Care, a nonprofit healing school for youth aging out of foster care.

== Filmography ==
=== Movies ===
Year	Title	Role	Notes
1988	Frantic	Extra	Uncredited
1992	Army of Darkness	Girl in S Mart	Uncredited
1994	Dark Angel: The Ascent	Veronica	Direct-to-video
1995	The Pompatus of Love	Times Square Kisser	
1996	Illtown	Lilly	
1997	Con Air	Ginny	
1998	Zero Effect	Jess	
1998	The Wedding Singer	Linda	
1999	200 Cigarettes	Caitlyn	
1999	Rituals and Resolutions	Mirabell	Short
2000	Takedown	Julia	
2000	The Guilty	Tanya Duncan	
2000	Skipped Parts	Delores	
2000	Ivans Xtc	Amanda Hill	
2001	Soul Survivors	Raven	
2002	Pressure	Amber	
2002	One Way Out	Gwen Buckley	
2003	Reeseville	Judith Meyers	
2006	Mother	Carolyn	Short
2006	Love Hollywood Style	Cathy Sherman	
2008	What Doesn't Kill You	Katie	
2009	The Soloist	Commuter #1	Uncredited
2010	Beneath the Dark	Sandy	
2016	My Dead Boyfriend	Norma	

=== Television ===
Year	Title	Role	Notes
1991	The Kids in the Hall	Strip Club On-looker	1 Episode, "Episode #3.1'"
1993	Northern Exposure	Carla	1 Episode, "Jaws of Life"
1994	New York Undercover	Angela Mancini	1 Episode, "Garbage"
1995	The Wright Verdicts	Michelle Farnon	1 Episode, "Sins of the Father"
1995	Family of Cops	Jackie Fein	TV movie
1997	Breach of Faith: A Family of Cops 2	Jackie Fein	TV movie
1997	Friends	Chloe	2 episodes
1997–1999	Cracker	Det. Hannah Tyler	14 episodes
1998	Seinfeld	Cindy	1 Episode, "The Maid"
2000	Jack & Jill	Lucy	3 episodes
2000	Providence	Andi Paulsen	9 episodes
2002	Federal Protection	Leigh Kirkindall	TV movie
2003	Dragnet	Amy Halsted	1 Episode, "Let's Make a Deal"
2003	The Twilight Zone	Kate Graham	1 Episode, "Burned"
2003–2004	The Guardian	Suzanne Pell	10 episodes
2006	Caved In: Prehistoric Terror	Samantha Palmer	TV movie
2006–2009	Exes & Ohs	Kris	14 episodes
2010	Huge	Teal	2 episodes
2011	The Mentalist	Rocket	1 Episode, "Like a Readheaded Stepchild"
2013	Girls	Jame	1 Episode, "Bad Friend"
2016	Ray Donovan	Mental Patient	1 Episode, "The Texan"
