= Family of Cops =

- Promotional release poster
- Genre: Crime; Drama
- Written by: Joel Blasberg
- Directed by: Ted Kotcheff
- Starring: Charles Bronson; Daniel Baldwin; Barbara Williams; Angela Featherstone; Sebastian Spence
- Music by: Peter Manning Robinson
- Countries of origin: United States; Canada
- Original language: English

Production
- Executive producer: Douglas S. Cramer
- Producer: Peter Bray
- Cinematography: François Protat
- Editor: Ron Wisman
- Running time: 87 minutes
- Production companies: The Cramer Company; Joel Blasberg Company; Le Monde Entertainment; Alliance Communications

Original release
- Network: CBS
- Release: November 26, 1995

Related
- Breach of Faith: A Family of Cops 2 (1997)

Family of Cops is a 1995 American-Canadian made-for-television crime drama film from Trimark Pictures, directed by Ted Kotcheff and starring Charles Bronson, Daniel Baldwin, Angela Featherstone, and Sebastian Spence. The film premiered on CBS on November 26, 1995. It was filmed in Milwaukee, Wisconsin, United States and Toronto, Ontario, Canada.

It is the first installment in the Family of Cops film series, and was followed by Breach of Faith: A Family of Cops 2 (1997) and Family of Cops 3 (1999).

== Plot ==
Milwaukee Police Department inspector Paul Fein (Charles Bronson) is a veteran police commander whose eldest son Ben (Daniel Baldwin) is a senior police detective, whose older daughter Kate (Barbara Williams) is a public defender who takes her job very seriously, and whose younger son Eddie (Sebastian Spence) is also a cop assigned to the department's Patrol Bureau. Paul is assigned to investigate the murder of a prominent businessman, and he soon learns that the field of suspects has been narrowed down to the victim's sexually freewheeling wife Anna (Lesley-Anne Down) and Paul's wild-child daughter Jackie (Angela Featherstone). Neither Paul, Ben, nor Eddie believe that Jackie could have committed the murder, and soon Paul is using himself as a decoy in a bid to find out more about what Anna does and does not know about her husband's death.

== Cast ==
- Charles Bronson as Commissioner Paul Fein
- Daniel Baldwin as Detective Ben Fein
- Barbara Williams as Kate Fein
- Angela Featherstone as Jackie Fein
- Sebastian Spence as Officer Eddie Fein
- Lesley-Anne Down as Anna Novacek
- Claudette Mink as Marci Sullivan

== Sequel ==
A sequel titled Breach of Faith: A Family of Cops 2, was released in 1997.
