= Caved In: Prehistoric Terror =

2006 television horror film

- Written by: Michael Konyves
- Directed by: Richard Pepin
- Starring: Christopher Atkins; Colm Meaney; Angela Featherstone; David Palffy; Chelan Simmons; Stevie Mitchell Brian Clyde
- Music by: Aldo Shllak
- Original language: English

Production
- Producer: Lisa M. Hansen
- Cinematography: Adolfo Bartoli
- Running time: 93 minutes
- Production companies: CineTel Pictures; Kentauros Entertainment

Original release
- Network: Sci Fi Channel
- Release: January 7, 2006

Caved In: Prehistoric Terror is a 2006 American "Sci-Fi Original" film, created by the Sci-Fi channel. Directed by Richard Pepin and written by Michael Konyves, it follows a party of tourists who become trapped underground by a cave-in, and are then killed one by one by giant prehistoric rhinoceros beetles.

== Plot ==
In Switzerland in 1948, a group of miners in a salt mine discover giant prehistoric rhinoceros beetles. The beetles attack the miners, and swiftly kill them.

In the present day, a cave tour guide John Palmer is requested, by Vincent and Sophia, to take a group of explorers down into the salt mine. John agrees to take the group, consisting of Vincent, Sophia, Marcel, Hanz, Carlo and Ion, into the mine, not realizing that the group are, in fact, high-profile thieves who are seeking emeralds in the mine. John also takes his reluctant family - Samantha, Emily and Miles - who stay in a cabin near the mine with one of the thieves, Stephan.

John takes the group into the mine the following day. As they explore, Ion leaves the group for a cigarette. Marcel follows him and the pair get into a fight, which results in Marcel pushing Ion over a ledge, where he is attacked by one of the beetles. Meanwhile, Miles discovers the entrance to the mine and enters alone. Samantha soon notices the absence of Miles and begins to search for him, sending Emily and Stephan out to look for him also. Back in the mine, Marcel tells the group Ion fell, and the group continues to explore. However, John demands that the group leave the mine, but Marcel forces him, telling him that he will instruct Stephan to kill Samantha and Emily if they turn back. Marcel then talks to Stephan on a walkie-talkie and tells him to tie Samantha and Emily up in the cabin. As Stephan is about to take Emily hostage, Samantha arrives and knocks him out.

In the mine, the group searches for the emeralds, but is attacked by the beetles, which kill Carlo. The rest of the group fends the beetles off with their guns. However, a cave-in occurs, causing a crack to appear in the ground in the forest near Samantha and Emily. A number of beetles escape and begin to chase them back to the cabin. Inside, Samantha attempts to get into contact with John on the walkie talkie; however, when this fails Samantha and Emily decide to leave the cabin armed with a gun, only to both be knocked unconscious by Stephan. Meanwhile, Marcel forces the group to continue to the emeralds, causing tensions to run high. Marcel and Vincent get into an argument, leading Marcel to shoot Vincent dead before the survivours are once again attacked by the beetles, but manage to escape. When Samantha and Emily wake up, Stephan does not believe their warnings of the beetles, but he is decapitated when the beetles attack the cabin, while Samantha and Emily escape.

In the mine, Miles is chased by a beetle, but is saved by John, Sophia and Hanz, while Marcel sneaks away to get the emeralds. The others catch up with Marcel as he collects the emeralds, and find a way to an exit, but Marcel believes they will send him to prison so he fatally shoots Hanz, before being torn in half by a beetle. John, Sophie and Miles continue their escape, while a barely alive Hanz holds off several beetles before eventually becoming overwhelmed and killed. John, Sophia and Miles reach an exit, but a queen beetle blocks their path. John shoots the queen, injuring it. On the surface, Samantha and Emily are attacked by a group of the beetles. Emily contacts John on the walkie talkie, allowing the beetles on the surface to hear the queen beetle in pain, resulting in the beetles going down into the mine. John and Miles set down explosives in the mine, before escaping with Sophia as the beetles are killed in the explosions and collapse of the mine. Reaching the surface, Sophia gives John a bag of the emeralds, while taking some for herself, before leaving the reunited family.

== Cast ==
- Christopher Atkins as John Palmer
- Colm Meaney as Vincent
- Angela Featherstone as Samantha Palmer
- Monica Barladeanu as Sophia
- David Palffy as Marcel
- Chelan Simmons as Emily Palmer
- Stevie Mitchell as Miles Palmer
- Marius Chivu as Hanz
- Cristian Popa as Stephan
- Vlad Jipa as Carlo
- Razvan Popa as Muller
- Marius Capota as Ion
- Adrian Pintea as Supervisor Frisch
