= 200 Cigarettes =

1999 film by Risa Bramon Garcia

- Theatrical release poster
- Directed by: Risa Bramon Garcia
- Written by: Shana Larsen
- Produced by: Betsy Beers; David Gale; Van Toffler
- Starring: Ben Affleck; Casey Affleck; Dave Chappelle; Guillermo Díaz; Angela Featherstone; Janeane Garofalo; Gaby Hoffmann; Kate Hudson; Courtney Love; Jay Mohr; Martha Plimpton; Christina Ricci; Paul Rudd
- Cinematography: Frank Prinzi
- Edited by: Lisa Zeno Churgin
- Music by: Bob Mothersbaugh; Mark Mothersbaugh
- Production companies: MTV Productions; Lakeshore Entertainment
- Distributed by: Paramount Pictures
- Release date: February 26, 1999
- Running time: 101 minutes
- Country: United States
- Language: English
- Budget: $6 million
- Box office: $6.9 million

200 Cigarettes is a 1999 American comedy film directed by Risa Bramon Garcia and written by Shana Larsen. The film follows multiple characters in New York City on New Year's Eve 1981. The film features an ensemble cast consisting of brothers Ben and Casey Affleck, Dave Chappelle, Guillermo Díaz, Angela Featherstone, Janeane Garofalo, Gaby Hoffmann, Kate Hudson, Courtney Love, Jay Mohr, Nicole Ari Parker, Martha Plimpton, Christina Ricci and Paul Rudd, with a cameo by Elvis Costello, as well as paintings by Sally Davies.

== Plot ==
The film follows various plot arcs all occurring on New Year's Eve of 1981. Monica is throwing a big party and is desperately afraid no one will attend. Early on, the only arrival is her friend Hillary. As Monica tries to convince Hillary to stay, various other groupings are shown making their way to the celebration.

The plot follows these several characters as they spend New Year's Eve in New York City before eventually turning up at Monica's party. The party guests are:

- Monica's cousin Val and her friend Stephie, who are from Ronkonkoma and who get lost in the seedy Alphabet City section of the borough and wander into a punk club where they meet Dave and Tom, who have a "package" they need to deliver.
- Ditsy and awkward Cindy, who is on a dinner date with the paranoid Jack.
- Lucy and her best friend Kevin, who are struggling with their mutual sexual tension. The film's title stems from the carton of cigarettes Lucy buys Kevin that night, a present on a holiday he loathes, which is also his birthday.
- Kevin's feminist ex-girlfriend Ellie, who walks in on Kevin and Lucy making out in a restroom stall
- A dim-witted and flirtatious bartender.
- Competitive friends Bridget and Caitlyn who attempt to ditch Bridget's boyfriend Eric, who is also Monica's ex.
- And an eccentric cab driver who takes them all around town throughout the evening in his disco-themed taxi.

Eventually, everyone finds their way to the party, although Monica has passed out after drowning her sorrows in alcohol. She wakes the next morning to find unrecognizable people on her floor, including Stephie, who tells her what a big hit her party was. Monica is thrilled, even though she missed it all, especially when she finds out that Elvis Costello showed up.

The final montage shows Polaroids of the party, narrated by the disco cabbie, mostly featuring the unlikely romances from the night and the unconscious Monica being propped up by her guests.

== Cast ==
- Ben Affleck as Bartender
- Casey Affleck as Tom
- Caleb Carr as Cynical Bar Patron
- Dave Chappelle as Disco Cabbie
- Elvis Costello as himself
- Guillermo Díaz as Dave
- Angela Featherstone as Caitlyn
- Janeane Garofalo as Ellie
- Gaby Hoffmann as Stephie
- Kate Hudson as Cindy
- Catherine Kellner as Hillary
- Courtney Love as Lucy
- Brian McCardie as Eric
- Jay Mohr as Jack
- Nicole Ari Parker as Bridget
- Martha Plimpton as Monica
- Christina Ricci as Val
- Paul Rudd as Kevin

== Release and Reception ==
The film received mostly unfavorable reviews and grossed $6.9 million in the United States.

On Rotten Tomatoes, the film has a "rotten" approval rating of 30% based on 64 reviews, with an average rating of 4.4/10. The website's critics consensus reads, "[a] clumsy and scattered comedy with a poorly executed script". On Metacritic, the film has a score of 33 out of 100 based on reviews from 26 critics, indicating "generally unfavorable" reviews.

Todd McCarthy of Variety called the film "dismally unfunny" and questions "if any director could have surmounted the script's limitations" and of the acting performances he says "only Garofalo and Ben Affleck manage to project any wit that cracks through the prevailing humorlessness."

Mick LaSalle of the San Francisco Chronicle gave it a positive review, saying "200 Cigarettes doesn't have a bad scene or a false note. The picture is a succession of pointed little moments, nicely written by Shana Larsen and acted with comic assurance and sensitivity."

== See also ==
- List of films set around New Year
