= Glass-Jet =

Fiberglass boats made in the 1950's

- Product type: Fiberglass runabout boats
- Produced by: J&R Plasticraft Corporation; Quality Plastics, Inc.
- Country: United States
- Introduced: 1956
- Discontinued: 1961

Glass Jet is the name brand of a line of fiberglass runabout boats manufactured in the 1950s. These boats are some of the earliest examples of fiberglass boat construction. Inspired by aviation and the arrival of jet airplane technology, the boats have extra large tail fins like many of the automobiles of the same era. Glass Jet boats were manufactured by the J&R Plasticraft Corporation in Reeseville, Wisconsin. This firm later ceased boat manufacturing and relocated to Waterloo, Wisconsin. Boat manufacturing continued in Reeseville, Wisconsin however by Quality Plastics, Inc. which produced the "Quality Glass" line of fiberglass boats. This firm went out of business in 1961. Though production numbers are unknown, many Glass Jet boats are known to exist and are presently sought after as collector's items.
