= Dark Angel: The Ascent =

- Theatrical release poster
- Directed by: Linda Hassani
- Written by: Matthew Bright
- Produced by: Oana Paunescu; Vlad Paunescu
- Starring: Angela Featherstone; Daniel Markel
- Cinematography: Vivi Dragan Vasile
- Music by: Fuzzbee Morse
- Production company: Full Moon Features
- Distributed by: Paramount Home Video
- Release date: 31 August 1994
- Running time: 81 minutes
- Countries: Romania; United States
- Language: English

Dark Angel: The Ascent is a 1994 romantic supernatural horror film directed by Linda Hassani. It was released direct-to-video by Full Moon Entertainment.

== Plot ==
Veronica (Angela Featherstone) is a young demoness with a rebellious attitude who dreams of living among human beings on Earth. She is constantly talking out of turn and questioning the ways of the demon resulting in punishment after punishment. Fed up with this, her father, Hellikan (Nicholas Worth), tries to kill her but her mother, Theresa (Charlotte Stewart), stops Hellikan and Veronica escapes with her hellhound, Hellraiser. Her friend, Mary, shows her a secret opening to the Earth above; she passes through the opening and arrives in the middle of a city via the sewers. As she steps onto Earth her demon form sheds and her appearance becomes human. As a result, she is naked. Veronica finds some clothes, but as she is wandering she is hit by a car.

Dr. Max Barris, a doctor at the nearby hospital, witnesses the accident and tends to her wounds. Despite her odd behavior he soon finds himself getting attached to her. Veronica persuades him to let her stay at his house since she has nowhere else to go. At Max's house she witnesses countless horrors on the news and is saddened by the sinful state of the world and by how evil the local mayor is.

Veronica starts going out at night and witnesses a pair of street muggers attack a woman with clear intent to rape her. She intervenes and kills them, causing the police to start investigating. The woman is sent to the hospital due to nonstop ranting about the final days. Later, Veronica kills two white policemen for needlessly harassing and beating a black civilian. In both murders, Hellraiser eats some of the victims' flesh. She leaves a threatening note to the mayor, after witnessing one of his bigoted speeches earlier in the film, and some of her hospital clothes at the second crime scene. Detectives who are on the case notify the mayor and then go to Max's house to follow the hospital lead. Veronica is home alone and alludes to the fact that the men who were killed were all evil, just like the mayor, causing the detectives to suspect her. At Veronica'a home, her mother is spoken to by a messenger from heaven saying that Veronica was chosen by God to help cleanse the world of sin.

The detectives start tailing Veronica and follow her and Max to a pornographic theatre where she spots them and a nightclub. At the nightclub, an old friend of Max's starts flirting with him but Max rebuffs her. Veronica insults her and after the friend leaves, Veronica follows her to the bathroom with the intent to kill her for coveting. In the bathroom a frightened man hiding with a woman in one of the stalls stabs Veronica with a switchblade, causing her to falter. Max's friend escapes but the senior detective appears at the door. Veronica telepathically shows him the horrors that await sinners for eternity in her home. He becomes incoherent and later tries to take himself off the case.

Max and Veronica leave the nightclub, and Max sews her wound without anesthetic. They have sex and Veronica's true demon form appears. Max accepts her and asks if she is responsible for the recent murders. She admits she is and repeats they were evil people. After Max falls asleep Veronica goes to the mayor's house and shows him the same telepathic message of eternal suffering in hell as before. The mayor screams in agony and as she runs away from the property, one of the mayor's guards shoots her in the back.

Veronica's parents receive another message that she must be taken home to bathe in the river Styx which will heal her. As Veronica arrives at Max's apartment he tells her they need to go to a hospital. The heavenly messenger appears and tells them Veronica needs to go home instead. Although unsure if Veronica will return, Max accepts and Veronica leaves.

A few days later, the mayor is on TV, announcing his resignation, and his intents to spend the rest of his life in a monastery. Later that night, Veronica appears in Max's room in a ball of fire. Upon seeing her, Max says "Thank you God!"

== Cast ==
- Angela Featherstone as Veronica
- Daniel Markel as Dr. Max Barris
- Nicholas Worth as Father / Hellikin
- Charlotte Stewart as Mother / Theresa
- Milton James as Mayor Wharton
- Mike Genovese as Detective Harper
- Michael C. Mahon as Detective Greenburg
- Heros as Hellraiser
- Constantin Drăgănescu as Man in Hell
- Cristina Stoica as Mary
- Valentin Teodosiu as Hell's Professor
- Marius Stanescu as Fake Prophet
- Constantin Cotimanis as Fake Prophet
- Kehli O'Byrne as Angel

== Reception ==
Visions magazine said the film is "a direct-to-video triumph". Starburst called the film "cheesy good fun". Fangoria gave a positive review and said that "Dark Angel is genuinely a lot of fun".
