= Robert Easton (actor) =

American actor (1930–2011)

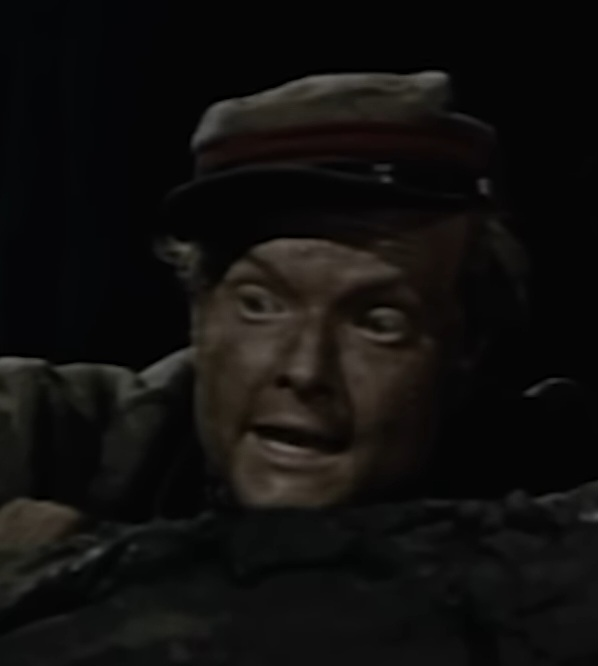
- Easton in Drums in the Deep South (1951)
- Born: Robert Easton Burke; November 23, 1930; Milwaukee, Wisconsin, U.S.
- Died: December 16, 2011 (aged 81); Toluca Lake, California, U.S.
- Occupation: Actor
- Years active: 1949–2011
- Spouse: June Grimstead (m. 1961; died 2005)
- Children: 1

Robert Easton (born Robert Easton Burke; November 23, 1930 – December 16, 2011) was an American actor whose career spanned more than 60 years. His mastery of English dialect earned him the epithet "The Man of a Thousand Voices". For decades, he was a leading Hollywood dialogue or accent coach.

== Early life ==
Born in Milwaukee, Wisconsin, in 1930, Robert was the only child of Mary Easton (née Kloes) and John Edward Burke. He moved to Texas at the age of seven with his mother, a former actress, following his parents' divorce. Resettling in the new cultural environment of San Antonio, young Robert took immediate notice of the style of speaking in the city, and he soon became interested in the variety of dialects spoken elsewhere in Texas and in the surrounding region. Struggling with a severe stuttering problem throughout his childhood also made Robert keenly aware of the "minutiae of speech" and the mechanics of pronunciation. Much later, in a 1998 interview with The New York Times, he explained, "When you have a big [stuttering] problem like that you compensate", adding "I found it easier to do voices other than my own." All of those early experiences of coping with his speech disorder and fine-tuning his ear to the peculiarities of regional accents and the subtleties of voice patterns proved to be, career-wise, great advantages for Robert. He not only became a successful character actor, he later gained a reputation in Hollywood as one of the more effective and highly respected dialect coaches in the entertainment industry.

== Radio ==
Robert began performing on radio as a teenager. At the age of 14, he auditioned and was chosen to join the cast of the popular Chicago-based radio program "Quiz Kids". He toured the country in 1945 with the cast of other Quiz Kids "child prodigies", and those performances led to other opportunities on radio, such as his role as Magnus Proudfoot on the early radio version of Gunsmoke. He also performed on Fibber McGee and Molly, The Fred Allen Show, The Halls of Ivy, Our Miss Brooks, Suspense, William Shakespeare—A Portrait in Sound, The Zero Hour, and on an array of other radio programs. Easton's voice acting on radio continued for decades to come. As late as 2008, at the age of 77, he performed as the scheming character Bart Rathbone on Adventures in Odyssey, a radio drama series for children.

== Films ==
By 1949, Easton began working in Hollywood films. That year, after briefly attending the University of Texas, the gangly, 6-foot-4-inch 19-year-old landed his first uncredited bit part as a parking attendant in the film Undertow, a crime thriller by Universal Pictures starring Rock Hudson. Easton continued to use his birth surname during the early years of his film career even though the majority of his roles between 1949 and 1951 remained uncredited on screen. His first onscreen credit—still presented as Robert Easton Burke—was for his role as a soldier in the 1951 MGM production of the Civil War classic The Red Badge of Courage, directed by John Huston and starring Audie Murphy. After that film, however, he legally changed his surname from Burke to Easton for professional reasons but principally "to distinguish himself from his father." Easton appeared in a series of other films during the 1950s before he was cast in 1958 as Sergeant Jonesie in When Hell Broke Loose, then as "Sparks" in the 1961 feature film Voyage to the Bottom of the Sea with Peter Lorre, and in 1962 as "Handown", a gunner on a B-17 in the World War II film The War Lover, which starred Steve McQueen and a very young Michael Crawford. Much later, in 1987, Easton was in the baseball film Long Gone in the role of Cletis Ramey. One of his more unusual voices and film roles was in 1991, when he portrayed a Klingon judge in Star Trek VI: The Undiscovered Country. He also appeared in Gods and Generals (2003) as John Janney and in Spiritual Warriors as Roger (2007). By the end of his career, Easton had performed in over 75 films.

== Television ==
Easton performed on many American television series and made-for-television movies from 1951 to the late 1980s, often portraying in his early roles slow-talking "country bumpkins". His first appearance on television, in a brief uncredited role, was on an episode of The Jack Benny Program, which originally aired on November 4, 1951. Near the end of a comedy sketch on that episode, Easton, who was cast as a hillbilly, is confronted by another irate mountain man, and the two exchange rifle fire. In 1955, during the first season of the long-running television Western Gunsmoke, he played Chester Goode's younger, prairie-wandering brother in an episode titled "Magnus". He also appeared on several episodes of The George Burns and Gracie Allen Show on CBS in 1957-1958, playing Brian McAfee, a dimwitted student at the University of Southern California. While living in England for several years in the early 1960s, Easton performed on a variety of British television and radio programs. In 1962 he was cast in the second episode of The Saint, "The Latin Touch", with Roger Moore; and he also provided the voices of "X-2-Zero" and "Phones" in Gerry and Sylvia Anderson's Supermarionation series Stingray.

Upon returning to the United States in late 1964, Easton resumed his acting on American television. In "All-Star Munster", a 1965 episode of The Munsters, he was cast yet again as a dimwitted country character named Moose Mallory, a college basketball star. He appeared as well on ABC's World War II drama Combat!, portraying an ill-fated soldier, Woody Jones, in the 1967 episode "A Little Jazz".

Additionally, Easton performed on Screen Directors Playhouse, Dangerous Assignment, My Little Margie, Adventures of Superman, Annie Oakley, The Bob Cummings Show, Riverboat, The Real McCoys, Rescue 8, Father Knows Best, The Red Skelton Show, Wagon Train, Rawhide, The Andy Griffith Show, The Beverly Hillbillies, Petticoat Junction, The Cara Williams Show, Get Smart, The Doris Day Show, The Mod Squad, Alias Smith and Jones, and Kolchak: The Night Stalker.

== Dialect coach ==
While Easton remained busy acting in films and on television series throughout the 1950s, by the early 1960s he had become frustrated playing what he described as "shiftless sharecroppers and half-witted hayseeds". He wanted to diversify his career, and he believed he could do so by improving his speaking and language skills in order to perform different types of characters. That belief, coupled with his longtime interest in the cultural and physiological aspects of speech, created a vocational sideline for Easton, one that later became a full-time second career for him.

After marrying June Bettine Grimstead in March 1961, Easton moved with his wife to her native England, where, for several years, in addition to performing on British radio and television programs, he began to intensify and systematically organize his study of accents and speech patterns. He traveled about the country recording the voices of farmers, cabdrivers, shopkeepers, and hotel guests in order to compare and analyze varying modes of English pronunciation, as well as the unique sounds and structures of other European languages and dialects he encountered.

Easton also took the opportunity while in London to attend University College, where he studied phonetics. In 1964, after he and his wife returned to the United States, he resumed his acting career in Hollywood, and he also began to assist his fellow actors with modifying their manner of speaking to improve their chances of landing roles in auditions, and to enhance the quality of their performances in films and in television productions.

As Easton's command of foreign and American regional accents continued to grow, so did his reputation as a dialect coach. He mastered in time over 200 ethnic, historical, regional, and sociological accents. By the late 1970s, his work as an instructor eclipsed acting as his principal vocation as increasing numbers of actors, screenwriters, directors, and studio executives were recognizing him as the entertainment industry's "dean of dialects" and the "Henry Higgins of Hollywood".

Easton coached hundreds of notable character actors and stars, helping them to speak convincing dialects in their roles. A few of the actors he tutored in speech included Gregory Peck, who required an accurate German accent for his dialogue in the 1978 film The Boys from Brazil; the English actor Laurence Olivier, whom he helped to speak in the style of a native resident of Michigan for The Betsy (1978); Ben Kingsley, another Englishman, whom he assisted with his Indian accent for Gandhi (1982) and his dialogue as a New Yorker in Bugsy (1991); Al Pacino with his Cuban dialect in Scarface (1983); Arnold Schwarzenegger, in adapting his Austrian accent to Russian for Red Heat (1988); Irish actor Liam Neeson for his role as a Kentuckian in Next of Kin (1989); Robert Duvall in his portrayal of Virginia native and Confederate General Robert E. Lee in Gods and Generals (2003); and Forest Whitaker, whom he coached to speak with specific regional African intonations and inflections for Whitaker's Oscar-winning performance as Ugandan political leader Idi Amin in The Last King of Scotland (2006).

When Robert Duvall first asked Easton to teach him how to speak like a Virginian, the seasoned dialect coach reportedly responded, "Which one? There are twelve distinct accents."

Easton's reputation as a dialect coach extended beyond Hollywood sets and Broadway stages. Over the years, he was also hired by business executives, trial lawyers, religious leaders, university professors, and by others who sought to soften their accents or alter their speech in other ways to improve their communication skills or to increase their self-confidence when making public presentations. In addition to instructing actors and other clients individually, Easton shared his expertise with groups of students by teaching classes in the anatomy of language and the use of dialects at both the University of California, Los Angeles and the University of Southern California. Although Easton's work as a personal coach and classroom teacher occupied the vast majority of his time during the final decades of his life, he still found time to act periodically in films, on television series, in made-for-television movies, and to perform voice characterizations.

== Voice acting outside of radio ==
In addition to his many other career activities, Easton also worked on occasion as a narrator and voice actor outside of radio. He provided the voice, for example, for the audio-animatronic figure of Thomas Jefferson in The American Adventure pavilion, which opened in 1982 at Disney's Epcot theme park in Florida. Ironically, Easton actually had historical connections to Jefferson. His great-grandfather Rufus Easton had been appointed by President Jefferson to be both the first postmaster of St. Louis and a judge for the Louisiana Territory, then the largest territory in North America.

== Professional organizations ==
Easton was active in many professional organizations, including the Academy of Television Arts & Sciences, which as part of its mission to promote "the advancement of the telecommunications arts and sciences" presents the annual Emmy Awards for professional excellence in television programming. For seven years, during the 1990s, he was a member of the performers peer group executive committee. He also served as a governor of the performers peer group for the Academy from 2000 to 2003.

== Personal life and death ==
In 1961, Easton married June Bettine Grimstead of Grimsby. They remained married for 44 years until her death in 2005. The couple had no children. However, Easton informally adopted a daughter, Heather, after Grimstead's death.

An avid book collector in a wide range of topics and a lifelong researcher of language, Easton amassed an extensive personal library of historical pamphlets, scientific journals, and other imprints, including over 100,000 volumes that ranged in publication dates from the 16th through the 20th century. The library finally became so large that it outgrew the space available in his 24-room home in Pasadena. He and his wife found a home in Toluca Lake in Los Angeles, California, with a tennis court, removed the court, and replaced it with a two-story structure to house the collection.

On December 16, 2011, Easton died at age 81 at his Toluca Lake home. His body, in accordance with his wishes, was cremated. Four years after Easton's death, his substantial personal library was sold in two installments – in the summer and fall of 2015 – by Addison & Sarova Auctioneers of Macon, Georgia.

== Selected filmography ==
- Undertow (1949) as Fisher
- Union Station (1950) as Con Victim (uncredited)
- Call Me Mister (1951) as Tennessee (uncredited)
- The Red Badge of Courage (1951) as Thompson
- Cause for Alarm! (1951) as Tex (uncredited)
- Savage Drums (1951) as Tex Channing
- Comin' Round the Mountain (1951) as Tex (uncredited)
- The Tall Target (1951) as Young Southerner (uncredited)
- Drums in the Deep South (1951) as Jerry
- Havana Rose (1951) as Hotel Clerk
- With a Song in My Heart (1952) as Kansas GI (uncredited)
- Belles on Their Toes (1952) as Franklin Dykes (uncredited)
- Dreamboat (1952) as Man in TV Hair Commercial (uncredited)
- O. Henry's Full House (1952) as Yokel in segment "The Ransom of Red Chief" (uncredited)
- Fearless Fagan (1952) as Corpora - Fagan's Guard (uncredited)
- Feudin' Fools (1952) as Caleb Smith
- The Beast from 20,000 Fathoms (1953) as Deckhand (uncredited)
- The Neanderthal Man (1953) as Danny - Townsman
- Take Me to Town (1953) as Train Vendor (uncredited)
- Combat Squad (1953) as Lewis
- The High and the Mighty (1954) as Cargo Clerk (uncredited)
- The Raid (1954) as Rebel Soldier (uncredited)
- Deep in My Heart (1954) as Cumberly (uncredited)
- The Kettles in the Ozarks (1956) as Lafe (uncredited)
- The Bold and the Brave (1956) as Tall Blonde G.I. (uncredited)
- Somebody Up There Likes Me (1956) as Cpl. Quinbury (uncredited)
- Hold Back the Night (1956) as Ackerman
- When Hell Broke Loose (1958) as Jonesie
- Voyage to the Bottom of the Sea (1961) as Sparks
- The Nun and the Sergeant (1962) as Orville Nupert
- The War Lover (1962) as Handown: Crew of 'The Body'
- Come Fly with Me (1963) as Navigator
- The Loved One (1965) as Dusty Acres
- Perry Mason (1965, S9, E9 "The Case of the Wrathful Wraith") - Ed Allison, insurance investigator
- One of Our Spies Is Missing (1966) as Mr. Bentley - the Texan
- Combat! (1967) as Woody : Episode, "A Little Jazz"
- Paint Your Wagon (1969) as Atwell
- The Andersonville Trial (1970) as Court Reporter
- Johnny Got His Gun (1971) as Third Doctor
- The Touch of Satan (1971) as Mr. Keitel
- Squares (1972) as Frank Warren
- Heavy Traffic (1973)
- Alias Big Cherry (1975)
- The Giant Spider Invasion (1975) as Kester
- Mr. Sycamore (1975) as Fred Staines
- Timber Tramps (1975)
- Pete's Dragon (1977) as Store Proprietor
- The Last of the Mohicans (1977, TV) as David Gamut
- When You Comin' Back, Red Ryder? (1979) as Customs Man
- The American Adventure (1982) as Thomas Jefferson (voice)
- Invitation to the Wedding (1983) as American Husband
- The NeverEnding Story (1984) as the voice of Morla (uncredited)
- Tai-Pan (1986)
- Long Gone (1987) as Cletis Ramey
- Working Girl (1988) as Armbrister
- Seven Minutes (1989) as Hecht
- Star Trek VI: The Undiscovered Country (1991) as Klingon Judge
- Pet Sematary Two (1992) as Priest
- Little Sister (1992) as M.C.
- Needful Things (1993) as Lester Pratt
- The Beverly Hillbillies (1993) as Mayor Amos Jasper
- Storybook (1996) as Hoot (voice)
- Merchants of Venus (1998) as Oleg
- Primary Colors (1998) as Dr. Beauregard
- Just One Night (2000) as Drunk Cab Driver
- Gods and Generals (2003) as John Janney
- Red Roses and Petrol (2003) as Old Geezer
- Lost (2004) as Minister
- Spiritual Warriors (2007) as Roger
- The Grift (2008) as Henry Addams
- The Spirit of Alton; Before During & After the Civil War (2004 family documentary) (2010) himself- In 2004 St. Louis Office spoke on Rufus Easton and family
- Horrorween (2011) as Neighbor
