= Robert Foxworth =

American actor (born 1941)

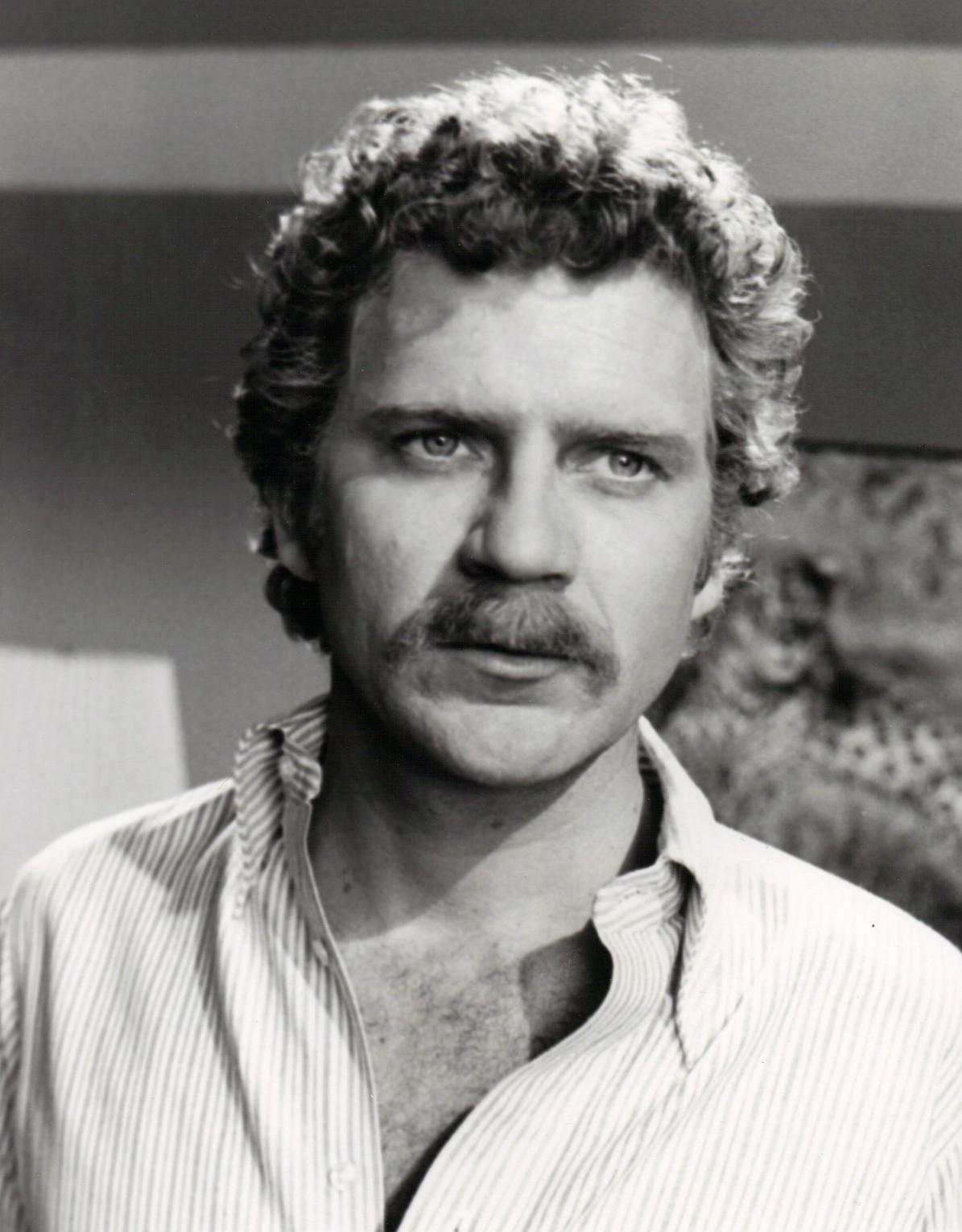
- Foxworth as a guest star on Cannon, 1975
- Born: Robert Heath Foxworth; November 1, 1941 (age 84); Houston, Texas, U.S.
- Occupation: Actor
- Years active: 1969–2019
- Spouses: Marilyn McCormick (m. 1964; div. 1974) Elizabeth Montgomery (m. 1993; died 1995) Stacey Thomas (m. 1998)
- Children: 2

Robert Heath Foxworth (born November 1, 1941) is a retired American film, stage, and television actor.

== Early life ==
Foxworth earned a Bachelor of Fine Arts degree in acting at Carnegie Mellon University.

== Career ==
Foxworth first gained attention as a stage actor, particularly at Washington, D.C.'s Arena Stage. He was offered the role of J. R. Ewing in Dallas, but turned it down and Larry Hagman was cast.

Among his numerous film and television roles, such as in the television series The Storefront Lawyers (1970–1971), Foxworth is best known for his stints on Falcon Crest (he played Jane Wyman's long-suffering nephew, Chase Gioberti, from 1981–1987) and Six Feet Under (he played Bernard Chenowith from 2001–2003), as well as a starring role in Gene Roddenberry's 1974 movie The Questor Tapes. He also appeared in the episode "All My Tomorrows" of the NBC romantic anthology series Love Story in 1973 and in the episode "The Mask of Adonis" from the 1977 NBC science fiction-horror anthology series Quinn Martin's Tales of the Unexpected. He had a guest-starring role on the seventh season of The West Wing and a guest spot on Law & Order.

Foxworth played the murderer, an Army colonel, in "Grand Deceptions," a 1989 episode of the TV series Columbo. He has also guest-starred in Hawaii Five-O, Password Plus, Murder, She Wrote, seaQuest DSV, Star Trek: Deep Space Nine, The Outer Limits, Star Trek: Enterprise, Stargate SG-1, and Babylon 5. He has done voice acting as the corrupt Professor Hamilton on Justice League Unlimited. He also voiced the Autobot Ratchet in the film Transformers and its sequels.

== Personal life ==
Foxworth was married from 1964 until 1974 to Marilyn McCormick, with whom he had two children, son Bo and daughter Kristyn. Foxworth was married to actress Elizabeth Montgomery from 1993 until her death in 1995. They had lived together for 20 years before marrying. Foxworth has been married to Stacey Thomas since August 2, 1998.

== Filmography ==
=== Television ===
Year	Title	Role	Notes
1970–1971	Storefront Lawyers	David Hansen	
1971	The Mod Squad	Gary Lefferts	Episode: "The Medicine Men"
1972–1973	The Streets of San Francisco	Ted Cullen, Dennis Hailey	2 episodes
1973	Frankenstein	Victor Frankenstein	Television film
1973	The Devil's Daughter	Steve Stone	Television film
1973	Hawaii Five-O	Eric Fowler	Episode: "The Listener"
1974	Mrs. Sundance	Jack Maddox	Television film
1974	The Questor Tapes	Questor	Television film
1974	Barnaby Jones	Whit Brewer	Episode: "A Gathering of Thieves"
1974	The F.B.I. Story: The FBI Versus Alvin Karpis, Public Enemy Number One	Alvin Karpis	Television film
1975	Cannon	Lanny McCrea	Episode: "The Iceman"
1976	Quincy, M.E.	Charles Sinclair	Episode: "A Star Is Dead"
1977	It Happened at Lakewood Manor	Mike Carr	Television film
1978	Deathmoon	Jason Palmer	Television film
1979	Password Plus	Himself	10 episodes
1980	The Memory of Eva Ryker	Norman Hall	Television film
1981	Peter and Paul	Peter	Miniseries
1981–1987	Falcon Crest	Chase Gioberti	Main cast (155 episodes)
1988	Double Standard	Leonard Harik	Television film
1988	Cagney & Lacey	Agent Duggan	Episode: "A Fair Shake"
1989	Columbo	Frank Brailie	Episode: "Grand Deceptions"
1990	Face to Face	Tobias Williams	Television film
1992	With Murder in Mind	Bob Sprague	Television film
1994	SeaQuest DSV	Royce Shelton	Episode: "Sympathy for the Deep"
1994–1995	Babylon 5	William Hague	2 episodes
1995	Murder, She Wrote	Harry Matthews	Episode: "School for Murder"
1996	Star Trek: Deep Space Nine	Admiral Leyton	2 episodes
1996	The Outer Limits	Charles Halsey	Episode: "Trial by Fire"
1996–1997	The Real Adventures of Jonny Quest	Race Bannon, additional voices	14 episodes
1997, 2003	Law & Order	Frederick Barrett, Charles Evans	2 episodes
1998–1999	LateLine	Peace McKenzie	17 episodes
2000, 2005	Law & Order: Special Victims Unit	Dr. Lett, Ben Hardley	2 episodes
2001–2003	Six Feet Under	Bernard Chenowith	6 episodes
2003	Jeremiah	President Emerson	2 episodes
2003	Stargate SG-1	Chairman Ashwan	Episode: "Memento"
2004	Star Trek: Enterprise	Administrator V'Las	3 episodes
2004–2005	Justice League Unlimited	Professor Hamilton (voice)	6 episodes
2005	The West Wing	George Montgomery	Episode: "The Wedding"
2006	Bones	Branson Rose	Episode: "The Man with the Bone"
2006	The Librarian: Return to King Solomon's Mines	Jerry	Television film
2006	Brothers & Sisters	Harry Packard	Episode: "For the Children"
2006	Boston Legal	Simon Devan	Episode: "BL: Los Angeles"

=== Film ===
Year	Title	Role	Notes
1976	Treasure of Matecumbe	Jim Burnie	
1977	Airport '77	Chambers	
1978	Damien - Omen II	Paul Buher	
1979	Prophecy	Rob	
1980	The Black Marble	A.M. Valnikov	
1984	Invisible Strangler	Charles Barrett	
1989	Beyond the Stars	Richard Michaels	
2005	Syriana	Tommy Barton	
2007	Kiss the Bride	Wayne	
2007	Transformers	Ratchet (voice)	
2009	Transformers: Revenge of the Fallen	Ratchet (voice)	
2011	Transformers: Dark of the Moon	Ratchet (voice)	
2014	Transformers: Age of Extinction	Ratchet (voice)	

=== Video games ===
Year	Title	Role	Notes
2009	Transformers: Revenge of the Fallen	Ratchet	

Preceded by Don Messick	Voice of Ratchet; 2007	Succeeded by Corey Burton
Preceded by Corey Burton	Voice of Ratchet; 2009	Succeeded by Corey Burton
Preceded by Jeffrey Combs	Voice of Ratchet; 2011	Succeeded by Jeffrey Combs
