= Joe Penny =

American actor

- Born: Joseph Edward Penny Jr. June 24, 1956 (age 70); Uxbridge, Middlesex, England
- Education: Marina High School
- Occupation: Actor
- Years active: 1977–2016
- Known for: Riptide; Jake and the Fatman
- Spouse: Cindy M. Penny (m. 2004)

Joseph Edward Penny Jr. (born June 24, 1956) is an American retired actor best known for his roles as Nick Ryder on Riptide from 1984 to 1986, and as Jake Styles in Jake and the Fatman from 1987 to 1992.

== Early life ==
Penny was born in Uxbridge, England to an American father, Joseph Edward Penny Sr., and an Italian mother, Anne Teresa Rita Cox. He was brought up in Marietta, Georgia. After his parents divorced, he moved to California with his mother. He attended Marina High School in Huntington Beach, California, where he played football and basketball.

== Career ==
Including a minor recurring role on Forever Fernwood in 1977, Penny went on to appear in numerous films and television shows in addition to the two series on which he starred. In 2005, he supported Lea Thompson in the Jane Doe films for the Hallmark Channel.

== Filmography ==
=== Feature films ===
Year	Title	Role	Notes
1978	Our Winning Season	Dean Berger	
1981	Bloody Birthday	Mr. Harding	
1981	S.O.B.	Officer Phil Buchwald	
1981	Gangster Wars	Benjamin "Bugsy" Siegel	
1981	Lifepod	G.W. Simmons	
1999	BitterSweet	Carl Peckato	Direct-to-video
1999	Jack of Hearts	Arden Cook	
2000	The Prophet's Game	Walter Motter	
2001	The Little Unicorn	Tiny	Direct-to-video
2016	The Last Night Inn	Sam	

=== Television films ===
Year	Title	Role	Notes
1977	Delta County, U.S.A.	Joe Ed	
1978	Deathmoon	Rick Bladen	
1979	The Girls in the Office	Beau Galloway	
1980	The Gossip Columnist	Paul Cameron	
1986	Perry Mason: The Case of the Shooting Star	Robert McCay	
1987	Blood Vows: The Story of a Mafia Wife	Edward Moran	
1987	Roses Are for the Rich	Lloyd Murphy	
1988	A Whisper Kills	Dan Walker	
1990	The Operation	Dr. Ed Betters	
1992	The Danger of Love: The Carolyn Warmus Story	Michael Carlin	
1994	Terror in the Night	Lonnie Carter	
1994	The Disappearance of Vonnie	Ron Rickman	
1995	Young at Heart	Michael Garaventi	
1996	Double Jeopardy	John Dubroski	
1996	She Woke Up Pregnant	Dr. Roger Nolton	
1997	Family of Cops II	Ben Fein	
1997	Stranger in My Home	Ned Covington	
1999	Family of Cops III: Under Suspicion	Ben Fein	
2002	Two Against Time	George Tomich	
2002	The Red Phone: Manhunt	Jack Darrow	
2003	The Red Phone: Checkmate	Jack Darrow	
2005	Vanishing Act	Frank Darnell	Jane Doe film series
2005	Now You See It, Now You Don't	Frank Darnell	Jane Doe film series
2005	Til Death Do Us Part	Frank Darnell	Jane Doe film series
2005	The Wrong Face	Frank Darnell	Jane Doe film series
2006	Yes, I Remember It Well	Frank Darnell	Jane Doe film series
2006	The Harder They Fall	Frank Darnell	Jane Doe film series
2007	Ties That Bind	Frank Darnell	Jane Doe film series
2007	Reign of the Gargoyles	Major John Gustafson	
2007	How To Fire Your Boss	Frank Darnell	Jane Doe film series
2008	Eye of the Beholder	Frank Darnell	Jane Doe film series
2011	Betrayed at 17	John Taylor	

=== Television series ===
Year	Title	Role	Notes
1977	The Hardy Boys/Nancy Drew Mysteries	Brandon	Episode: "The Mystery of Pirate's Cove"
1977	Forever Fernwood	Sal DiVito	8 episodes
1978	CHiPs	Officer Brent Delaney	Episode: "Flashback!"
1978	Mother, Juggs & Speed	Speed	TV pilot episode
1979	Samurai	Lee Cantrell	TV pilot episode
1979	Lou Grant	Dave Tynan	Episode: "Cop"
1980	Paris	Mike Fitz	Episode: "Fitz's Boys"
1980	Homefront	Rocco Spinelli	TV pilot episode
1981	The Gangster Chronicles	Benjamin "Bugsy" Siegel	13 episodes
1981	Flamingo Road	Nick Walker	Episode: "The Hostages" (Parts 1 & 2)
1981	Vega$	Nickie Andreas	Episode: "The Andreas Addiction"
1983	Tucker's Witch	Justin St. Peter	Episode: "Dye Job"
1983	Archie Bunker's Place	Rick Baxter	Episode: "I'm Torn Here"
1983	Savage: In the Orient	Det. Peter Savage	TV pilot episode
1983	Lottery!	Douglas Matson	Episode: "Denver: Following Through"
1983	Matt Houston	Eric Jason	Episode: "The Centerfold Murders"
1983	T.J. Hooker	Miles Dickson	Episode: "The Cheerleader Murder"
1984–1986	Riptide	Nick Ryder	56 episodes
1986–1990	Matlock	Paul Baron	3 episodes
1986	The Twilight Zone	Ricky Frost	Episode: "The Convict's Piano"
1987–1992	Jake and the Fatman	Det. Jake Styles	106 episodes
1995	Touched by an Angel	Zack Bennett	Episode: "Trust"
1998	Diagnosis: Murder	Det. Reggie Ackroyd	Episode: "The Last Resort"
1999	Twice in a Lifetime	Flash Jericho / David Lazarus	Episode: "Blood Brothers"
1999	Walker, Texas Ranger	Sonny Tantero	Episode: "Suspicious Minds"
2000	Chicken Soup for the Soul	David	Episode: "The Surprise"
2000	The Sopranos	Victor Musto	2 episodes
2002	Boomtown	Les Van Buren	Episode: "Insured by Smith & Wesson"
2003	7th Heaven	Nick	Episode: "Baggage"
2005	Threshold	Robert Sprague	Episode: "Shock"
2007	CSI: Crime Scene Investigation	Jack Oakley	Episode: "The Good, the Bad and the Dominatrix"
2008	Days of Our Lives	Martino Vitali	6 episodes
2008	CSI: Miami	Travis Drake	Episode: "Wrecking Crew"
2009–2010	Cold Case	Hank Butler	3 episodes
