= Reeseville, Wisconsin =

- Village
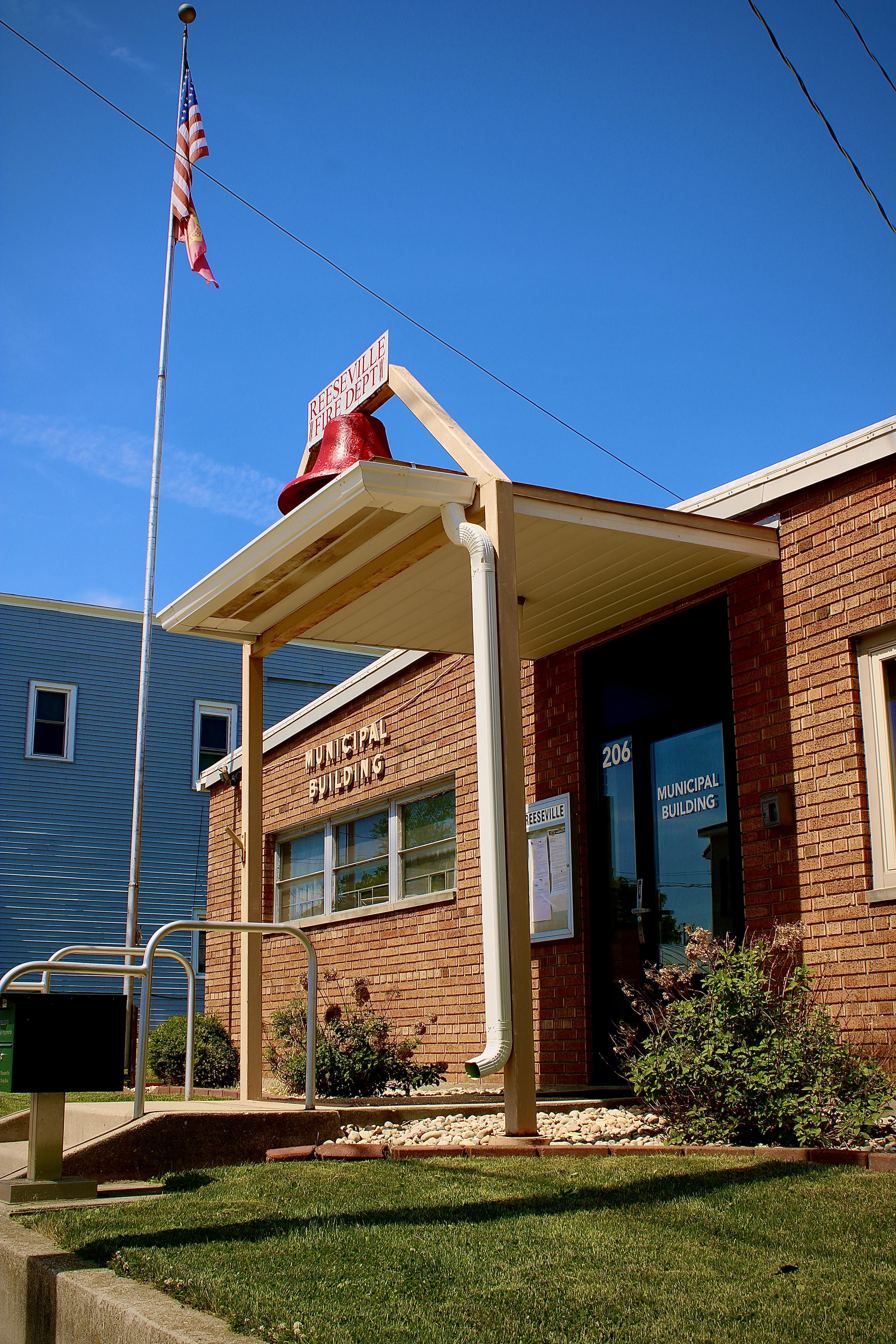

- Location of Reeseville in Dodge County, Wisconsin.
- Coordinates: 43°18′20″N 88°50′38″W
- Country: United States
- State: Wisconsin
- County: Dodge

Government
  - Type: Village
  - President: Jacob Pacala

Area
  - Total: 0.63 sq mi (1.62 km^{2})
  - Land: 0.63 sq mi (1.62 km^{2})
  - Water: 0 sq mi (0.00 km^{2})
- Elevation: 824 ft (251 m)

Population (2020)
  - Total: 763
  - Density: 1,088.0/sq mi (420.07/km^{2})
- Time zone: UTC-6 (Central (CST))
  - Summer (DST): UTC-5 (CDT)
- Area code: 920
- FIPS code: 55-66900
- GNIS feature ID: 1572180
- Website: www.vi.reeseville.wi.gov

Reeseville is a village in Dodge County, Wisconsin, United States. The population was 763 at the 2020 census.

== History ==
Reeseville was named after an early settler, Samuel Reese, by his son Adam Reese who surveyed and platted the area. Samuel Reese had settled in the area in 1845.

== Geography ==
Reeseville is located at 43°18′20″N 88°50′38″W (43.305452, -88.843847).

According to the United States Census Bureau, the village has a total area of 0.63 square miles (1.63 km^{2}), all land.

== Demographics ==
Historical population
Census	Pop.	Note	%±
1880	248		—
1890	329		32.7%
1900	393		19.5%
1910	352		−10.4%
1920	423		20.2%
1930	422		−0.2%
1940	407		−3.6%
1950	470		15.5%
1960	491		4.5%
1970	566		15.3%
1980	649		14.7%
1990	673		3.7%
2000	703		4.5%
2010	708		0.7%
2020	763		7.8%
U.S. Decennial Census

=== 2010 census ===
As of the census of 2010, there were 708 people, 288 households, and 181 families living in the village. The population density was 1,123.8 inhabitants per square mile (433.9/km^{2}). There were 322 housing units at an average density of 511.1 per square mile (197.3/km^{2}). The racial makeup of the village was 95.3% White, 0.7% African American, 1.0% Asian, 1.4% from other races, and 1.6% from two or more races. Hispanic or Latino of any race were 2.7% of the population.

There were 288 households, of which 32.6% had children under the age of 18 living with them, 49.7% were married couples living together, 6.9% had a female householder with no husband present, 6.3% had a male householder with no wife present, and 37.2% were non-families. 29.5% of all households were made up of individuals, and 10% had someone living alone who was 65 years of age or older. The average household size was 2.45 and the average family size was 3.02.

The median age in the village was 37.2 years. 26% of residents were under the age of 18; 7.7% were between the ages of 18 and 24; 25.6% were from 25 to 44; 29.6% were from 45 to 64; and 11.2% were 65 years of age or older. The gender makeup of the village was 51.0% male and 49.0% female.

=== 2000 census ===
As of the census of 2000, there were 703 people, 287 households, and 185 families living in the village. The population density was 1,158.8 people per square mile (445.0/km^{2}). There were 315 housing units at an average density of 519.2 per square mile (199.4/km^{2}). The racial makeup of the village was 98.86% White, 0.14% African American, 0.43% Native American, and 0.57% from two or more races. Hispanic or Latino of any race were 1.14% of the population.

There were 287 households, out of which 34.1% had children under the age of 18 living with them, 51.9% were married couples living together, 8.0% had a female householder with no husband present, and 35.5% were non-families. 30.0% of all households were made up of individuals, and 13.6% had someone living alone who was 65 years of age or older. The average household size was 2.45 and the average family size was 3.06.

In the village, the population was spread out, with 27.0% under the age of 18, 8.5% from 18 to 24, 33.1% from 25 to 44, 19.5% from 45 to 64, and 11.8% who were 65 years of age or older. The median age was 34 years. For every 100 females, there were 107.4 males. For every 100 females age 18 and over, there were 98.8 males.

The median income for a household in the village was $37,120, and the median income for a family was $44,375. Males had a median income of $31,932 versus $22,000 for females. The per capita income for the village was $16,036. About 7.3% of families and 9.9% of the population were below the poverty line, including 16.0% of those under age 18 and 12.2% of those age 65 or over.

== Industry ==
J&R Plasticraft Corporation was located in Reeseville in the mid- to late 1950s. J&R Plasticraft is best known today for the line of Glass-Jet fiberglass runabout boats manufactured in this time period. The Glass-Jet boats featured the distinctive automotive styling of the era, including tail fins and two-tone color schemes. Boat manufacturing was later taken up by a subsequent firm, Quality Plastics, Inc., also of Reeseville, and a product line of boat models were marketed as "Quality Glass" Boats. This firm ceased operations after 1960.

== Churches ==
There are three Churches in Reeseville including Immanuel Lutheran (Missouri Synod), First United Church of Christ, and Holy Family Catholic.

== Community Center ==
The Reeseville Community Center is available for meetings or events, and reservations can be made by contacting the village hall.

== In popular culture ==
The 2003 film Reeseville starring Majandra Delfino, Brad Hunt, Angela Featherstone, Mark Hamill, and Cotter Smith was based and filmed in Reeseville.
