= Breach of Faith: A Family of Cops 2 =

1997 television film

- Official Australian DVD cover
- Genre: Crime; Drama
- Written by: Joel Blasberg
- Directed by: David Greene
- Starring: Charles Bronson; Joe Penny; Diane Ladd; Sebastian Spence; Barbara Williams; Angela Featherstone
- Music by: Peter Manning Robinson
- Countries of origin: United States; Canada
- Original language: English

Production
- Executive producer: Douglas S. Cramer
- Producer: John Ryan
- Cinematography: Ron Orieux
- Editor: Michael Pacek
- Running time: 87 minutes
- Production companies: The Cramer Company; Joel Blasberg Company; Le Monde Entertainment; Alliance Communications

Original release
- Network: CBS
- Release: February 2, 1997

Related
- Family of Cops (1995); Family of Cops 3 (1999)

Breach of Faith: A Family of Cops 2 is a 1997 American made-for-television crime drama film starring Charles Bronson sequel to Family of Cops (1995), it is the second installment in the Family of Cops film series. The film premiered on CBS on February 2, 1997. In the film, Joe Penny takes over the role of eldest son Ben Fein, who was played by Daniel Baldwin in the first film. This was the second-to-last film Bronson starred in before his death in 2003.

== Plot ==
The Fein family of police, led by Paul Fein, now a police commissioner, investigate the murder of a local priest who had ties with the Russian Mafia, who proceed to try to draw the family off the case. Paul's eldest son Detective Ben and youngest son Patrolman Eddie deal with the investigation and soon find themselves targeted by hitmen who proceed to harass the entire family to try to get them to drop the case. Meanwhile, Paul's eldest daughter Kate has doubts about her job when a young, 12-year-old criminal who she represented is paroled and later killed in a robbery when Eddie's partner is also killed. Paul's youngest daughter Jackie tries to get her life back on track by looking for a job, and ultimately decides to join the police academy to become a cop. Also, Paul's sister Shelly comes for a visit and is eventually nearly caught in the crossfire of the case.

== Cast ==
- Charles Bronson as Commissioner Paul Fein
- Joe Penny as Ben Fein
- Diane Ladd as Shelly Fein
- Sebastian Spence as Eddie Fein
- Barbara Williams as Kate Fein
- Angela Featherstone as Jackie Fein

== Sequel ==
A sequel titled Family of Cops 3, was released in 1999.
