= When Hell Broke Loose =

1958 film by Kenneth G. Crane

- Theatrical release poster
- Directed by: Kenneth G. Crane
- Written by: Oscar Brodney; Sol Dolgin; Ib Melchior
- Produced by: Oscar Brodney
- Starring: Charles Bronson; Robert Easton; Richard Jaeckel
- Music by: Albert Glasser
- Distributed by: Paramount Pictures
- Release date: November 1, 1958
- Running time: 78 minutes
- Country: United States
- Language: English

When Hell Broke Loose is a 1958 World War II war film directed by Kenneth G. Crane and starring Charles Bronson. It was co-written by Ib Melchior.

== Plot ==
Steve Boland is a cynical bookie who agrees to enlist in the US Army during World War II to avoid going to jail. He does not intend to join up, but the judge makes sure he does. He has an unspectacular military career with his criminal past getting him into trouble but he comes into his own when he falls in love with a German woman who has a brother and lover working as saboteurs in the closing days of the war.

When Werwolf German infiltrators, saboteurs and assassins dressed in American uniform parachute behind the American lines, Boland's superiors neither believe nor trust him. He realizes that everything happens for a reason.

== Cast ==
Actor	Roles
Charles Bronson	Steve Boland
Richard Jaeckel	Karl
Violet Rensing	Ilsa
Arvid Nelson	Ludwig
Robert Easton	Jonesie
Eddie Foy III	Brooklyn
Robert Stevenson	Capt. Grayson
Dennis McCarthy	Capt. Melton
Russell Thorson	Colonel Crandall (uncredited)

== See also ==
- Verboten!, a 1959 film with similar elements
