= Family of Cops 3 =

- Official DVD cover
- Genre: Crime; Drama
- Written by: Noah Jubelirer
- Directed by: Sheldon Larry
- Starring: Charles Bronson; Sebastian Spence; Joe Penny; Barbara Williams; Nicole de Boer; Sean McCann
- Music by: Fred Mollin
- Country of origin: United States
- Original language: English

Production
- Executive producer: Douglas S. Cramer
- Producer: Nicholas J. Gray
- Cinematography: Bert Dunk
- Editor: James Bredin
- Running time: 90 minutes
- Production companies: The Cramer Company; Joel Blasberg Company; Alliance Atlantis Communications

Original release
- Network: CBS
- Release: January 12, 1999

Related
- Breach of Faith: A Family of Cops 2 (1997)

Family of Cops 3 is a 1999 American made-for-television crime drama film starring Charles Bronson. The film premiered on CBS on January 12, 1999. A sequel to Breach of Faith: A Family of Cops 2 (1997), it is the third installment in the Family of Cops film series and Bronson's final film before his death in 2003.

== Plot ==
Chief Inspector Paul Fein and his eldest son Inspector Ben Fein investigate the double murder of wealthy banker Phillip Chandler (whose family is also in politics) and his wife in their home. Their first suspect, the spoiled and rotten heir Evan Chandler, is later found murdered in his car. Paul is likely to succeed the chief of police who is about to retire, but then finds the chief was involved in a major drug-related corruption web, and when the chief is killed in a drive-by shooting, Paul becomes the target of various unfounded accusations and gets taken off the case. However, Paul and Ben keep investigating off the books, forcing a fiscal investigator to collaborate. Meanwhile, youngest daughter Jackie finally graduates from the police academy and takes her first job at the same police station that the Fein family works at, while youngest son Eddie feels guilty for failing to save his partner's life in a drug raid shootout, even if he is officially cleared, in which Eddie decides to quit the force. Eddie soon gets romantically involved with Caroline Chandler and later saves her life from the unknown killer who is now targeting her. Elsewhere, as Paul continues his romance with Detective Anne Meyer, he also learns that his eldest daughter, Kate, is pregnant and she decides to keep the baby in order to raise the child as a single mother.

== Cast ==
- Charles Bronson as Commissioner Paul Fein
- Sebastian Spence as Officer Eddie Fein
- Joe Penny as Detective Ben Fein
- Barbara Williams as Kate Fein
- Nicole de Boer as Jackie Fein
- Sean McCann as Jim Grkowski
- Torri Higginson as Caroline Chandler
- Kim Weeks as Anne Meyer
