= Harper's Magazine Press =

American book publisher (1969–1976)

Harper's Magazine Press was a hardcover book publisher for the trade market, a joint venture of Harper's Magazine and Harper & Row. It was founded in New York City in 1969 and published its last books in 1976. It published literary and commercial fiction and nonfiction, cultural analysis, poetry, and books of interest to a general audience.

== History ==
In 1969, the editor-in-chief of Harper's Magazine, Willie Morris, convinced John Cowles Jr., whose family had acquired both the magazine and Harper & Row, that a new imprint could benefit both entities. He appointed Herman C. Gollob as editor-in-chief of the press. Gollob said he had "the freedom to operate almost as I pleased." "[I] almost feel guilty," Gollob said when the press launched, "to be hurling a few more books at the public." He had worked at Little, Brown for five years, and reminisced that, "Little, Brown once had a slogan which said, ‘Fewer and better books.’ Ain’t a bad slogan."

In June 1969, in what was thought to be the press's first big break, it announced that "a definitive book about the motion picture career of Orson Welles," co-written by Welles and Peter Bogdanovich, would be issued the next year. The book was to include "extensive memos, telegrams and letters Welles wrote R.K.O. after the studio cut almost an hour out of The Magnificent Ambersons," a "30-page memorandum" critiquing some of the music used in The Lady from Shanghai, and transcripts of some of the "75 hours of taped interviews" the two had so far recorded. In August 1970, the book was said to be scheduled for the following summer. However, the book was not completed before the publishing house folded. It was ultimately published in 1992 by HarperCollins.

After Morris resigned under pressure from the magazine in the summer of 1971, Gollob also left, and went to work for Atheneum. He said, "The party—and a hell of a party it had been—was over." Lawrence Freundlich replaced him as editor-in-chief.

=== Debuts ===
The press was the venue for many authors' first books. That same year Gollob left, the press published the first book written by Bill Moyers, who was just beginning his work for PBS. Under Freundlich, it published the first books of and Fred Feldkamp, Phyllis Feldkamp, Philip J. Hilts, Mark Lipman, Lev Navrozov, Richard Selzer, Nancy Hunter Steiner, Richard Shulman, Ferris Urbanowski, and Min S. Yee.

The press published Marcella Hazan’s debut, The Classic Italian Cookbook, in 1973. Julia Child recommended it, referring to its author as "my mentor in all things Italian." The book sold poorly and Hazan, feeling it was mishandled, took it to a different publisher. She went on to publish seven more books, shape Italian cuisine in the U.S., and win lifetime achievement awards from both the James Beard Foundation and the International Association of Culinary Professionals (2000, 2004).

In 1974, the press had its greatest critical and commercial success with another new author: Annie Dillard's Pilgrim at Tinker Creek, which sold extraordinarily well, was made a Book of the Month Club main selection. Within the next year, "a public auction was held for the paperback rights, an unprecedented coup for a first book published by a small publishing house," and it won a Pulitzer Prize. It was regarded at the time as "an important new book by an important young writer," and has since been called "the Walden of our time." New Yorker editor David Remnick notes that it "is acknowledged as a classic almost universally."

== Partial list of books published ==
=== 1970 ===
- John W. Aldridge - In the Country of the Young (ISBN 0061202002)

1971

- Ralph W. Conant - The Prospects For Revolution: A Study of Riots, Civil Disobedience, and Insurrection in Contemporary America (LCCN 70-96016)
- Willie Morris - Yazoo: Integration in a Deep-Southern Town (ISBN 0061263907)
- Bill Moyers - Listening to America: A Traveler Rediscovers His Country (ISBN 0061264008)

=== 1972 ===
- John W. Aldridge - The Devil In the Fire: Retrospective Essays on American Literature and Culture, 1951-1971 (ISBN 0061202010)
- Phyllis Feldkamp and Fred Feldkamp - The Good Life ... or What's Left of It: Being a Recounting of the Pleasures of the Senses that Contribute to the Enjoyment of Life in France (ISBN 0061224804)

=== 1973 ===
- Pierre Androuet (translated from the French by John Githens) - The Complete Encyclopedia of French Cheese (and Many other Continental Varieties) (ISBN 0061202304)
- Marcella Hazan - The Classic Italian Cookbook (ISBN 9780061226489)
- Arthur Simon and Paul Simon - The Politics of World Hunger: Grass-roots Politics and World Poverty (ISBN 0061277762)
- Nancy Hunter Steiner - A Closer Look at Ariel: A Memory of Sylvia Plath (ISBN 0061278157)
- Min S. Yee - The Melancholy History of Soledad Prison: In which a Utopian Scheme Turns Bedlam (ISBN 006129800X)

=== 1974 ===
- Rupert Bruce-Mitford - Aspects of Anglo-Saxon Archaeology: Sutton Hoo and other discoveries (ISBN 0061204803)
- Ovid Demaris - Dirty Business: The Corporate-Political Money-Power Game (ISBN 0061219509)
- Annie Dillard - Pilgrim at Tinker Creek (ISBN 0061219800)
- Philip J. Hilts - Behavior Mod (ISBN 0061227005)
- Richard Selzer: Rituals of Surgery (ISBN 0061277606)
- Rexford Tugwell: The Emerging Constitution (ISBN 0061282251)

=== 1975 ===
- Ovid Demaris - The Director: An Oral Biography of J. Edgar Hoover (ISBN 0061219517)
- H. Bruce Franklin: Back Where You Came From: A Life in the Death of the Empire (ISBN 0061225258)
- Lev Navrozov - The Education of Lev Navrozov: A Life in the Closed World Once Called Russia (ISBN 0061264156)
- Mary Richie: Loving Upward: A Novel (ISBN 0061275085)
- Ferris Urbanowski, with Balaram; Charles W. Haney, photography - Yoga for New Parents: The Experience and the Practice (ISBN 0061283002)

=== 1976 ===
- Stoyan Christowe - The Eagle and the Stork (ISBN 0061215457)
- Erik J. Friis (editor): The Scandinavian Presence in North America (ISBN 0061225150)
- Richard Shulman: The Billion Dollar Bookies (ISBN 0061277754)
