= Navrozov =

Navrozov may refer to:

- Andrei Navrozov (born 1956), Russian poet
- Lev Navrozov (1928–2017), Russian author, historian, polemicist
