= The Brothers Karamazov =

1880 novel by Fyodor Dostoevsky

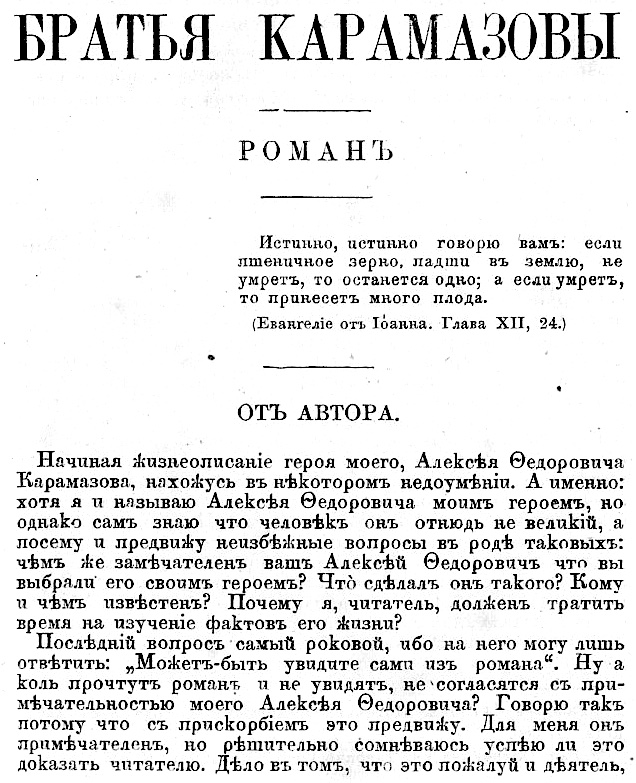
- The first page of the first edition of The Brothers Karamazov
- Author: Fyodor Dostoevsky
- Original title: Братья Карамазовы (Brat'ya Karamazovy)
- Translator: Constance Garnett (1912); David Magarshack (1958); Andrew R. MacAndrew (1970); Julius Katzer (1980); Richard Pevear and Larissa Volokhonsky (1990); David McDuff (1993); Ignat Avsey (1994); Michael R. Katz (2023)
- Language: Russian
- Genre: Philosophical novel; theological fiction
- Publisher: The Russian Messenger (as serial)
- Publication date: 1879–80; separate edition 1880
- Publication place: Russia
- English publication date: 1912
- Dewey Decimal: 891.733
- LC Class: PG3325-3328
- Text: The Brothers Karamazov at Wikisource

The Brothers Karamazov (Russian: Братья Карамазовы, romanized: Brat'ya Karamazovy, IPA: [ˈbratʲjə kərɐˈmazəvɨ]), also translated as The Karamazov Brothers, is the sixteenth and final novel by Russian author Fyodor Dostoevsky. Dostoevsky spent nearly two years writing The Brothers Karamazov, which was published as a serial in The Russian Messenger from January 1879 to November 1880. Dostoevsky died less than four months after its publication. It has been acclaimed as one of the supreme achievements in world literature.

Set in 19th-century Russia, The Brothers Karamazov is a passionate philosophical novel that discusses questions of God, free will, and morality. It has also been described as a theological drama dealing with problems of faith, doubt, and reason in the context of a modernizing Russia; its plot revolves around the subject of patricide. Dostoevsky composed much of the novel in Staraya Russa, which inspired the main setting.

== Background ==
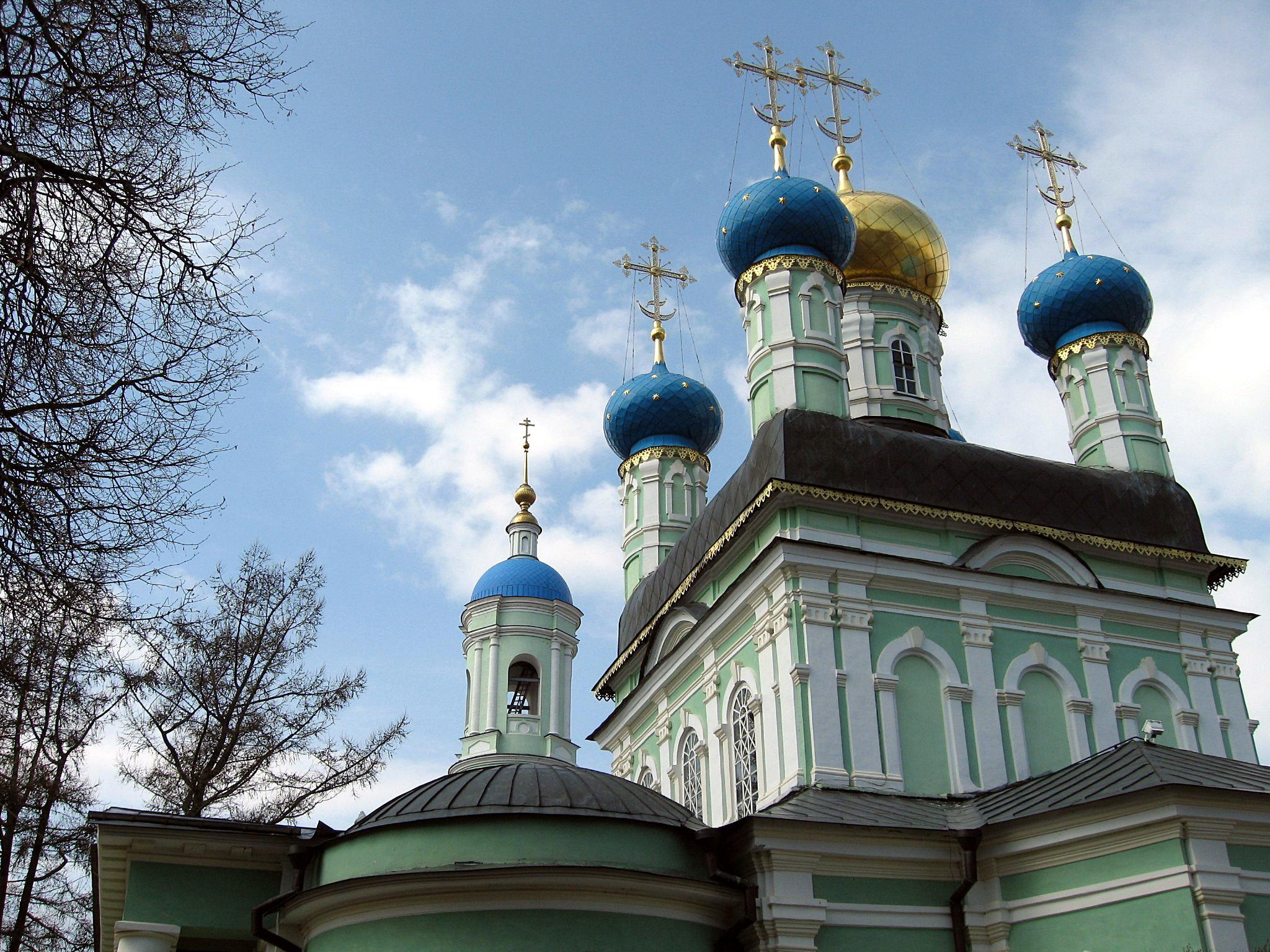
Optina Monastery served as a spiritual center for Russia in the 19th century and inspired many aspects of The Brothers Karamazov.

Although Dostoevsky began his first notes for The Brothers Karamazov in April 1878, the novel incorporated elements and themes from an earlier unfinished project he had begun in 1869 titled The Life of a Great Sinner. Another unfinished project, Drama in Tobolsk (Драма в Тобольске), is considered to be the first draft of the first chapter of The Brothers Karamazov. Dated 13 September 1874, it tells of a fictional murder in Staraya Russa committed by a praporshchik named Dmitry Ilynskov (based on a real soldier from Omsk), who is thought to have murdered his father. It goes on to note that the father's body was suddenly discovered in a pit under a house. The similarly unfinished Sorokoviny (Сороковины), dated 1 August 1875, is reflected in book IX, chapters 3–5 and book XI, chapter nine.

In the October 1877 Writer's Diary article "To the Reader", Dostoevsky mentions a "literary work that has imperceptibly and involuntarily been taking shape within me over these two years of publishing the Diary." The Diary covered a multitude of themes and issues, some of which would be explored in greater depth in The Brothers Karamazov. These include patricide, law and order, and a variety of social problems.

The writing of The Brothers Karamazov was altered by a personal tragedy: in May 1878, Dostoevsky's three-year-old son Alyosha died of epilepsy, a condition inherited from his father. The novelist's grief is apparent throughout the book. Dostoevsky named the hero Alyosha, and imbued him with qualities that he sought and most admired. His loss is also reflected in the story of Captain Snegiryov and his young son Ilyusha.

The death of his son brought Dostoevsky to the Optina Monastery later that year. There he found inspiration for several aspects of The Brothers Karamazov, though at the time he intended to write a novel about childhood instead. Parts of the biographical section of Zosima's life are based on "The Life of the Elder Leonid", a text he found at Optina.

== Major characters ==
=== Fyodor Pavlovich Karamazov ===
Fyodor Pavlovich, a 55-year-old sensualist and compulsive liar, is the father of three sons — Dmitri, Ivan and Alexei — from two marriages. He is rumored to have also fathered an illegitimate son, Pavel Fyodorovich Smerdyakov, whom he employs as his servant. Fyodor Pavlovich takes no interest in any of his sons at their birth, who are, as a result, raised apart from each other and their father. The relationship between Fyodor and his adult sons drives much of the plot in the novel.

=== Dmitri Fyodorovich Karamazov ===
Dmitri Fyodorovich (often referred to as Mitya) is Fyodor Karamazov's 28-year-old eldest son and the only offspring of his first marriage, with Adelaida Ivanovna Miusov. Dmitri is considered to be a sensualist, like his father, and regularly indulges in alcoholism and carousing. Dmitri is brought into contact with his family when he finds himself in need of his inheritance, which he believes is being withheld by his father. He was engaged to be married to Katerina Ivanovna, but breaks that off after falling in love with Grushenka. Dmitri's relationship with his father is the most volatile of the brothers, escalating to violence as he and his father begin fighting over his inheritance and Grushenka. While he maintains a relationship with Ivan, he is closest to his younger brother Alyosha, referring to him as his "cherub".

The character of Dmitri was initially inspired by a convict, D.I. Ilyinsky, whom Dostoevsky met while in prison in Siberia. Ilyinsky, who is described in Dostoevsky's memoir-novel Notes from the House of the Dead as "always in the liveliest, merriest spirits", was in prison for murdering his father in order to obtain his inheritance, although he always steadfastly maintained his innocence. He was later freed after another man confessed to the crime.

=== Ivan Fyodorovich Karamazov ===
Ivan Fyodorovich (sometimes also referred to as Vanya) is the 24-year-old middle son, and the first from Fyodor Pavlovich's second marriage. Ivan is reserved and aloof, but also intellectually brilliant. His dictum "if there is no God, everything is lawful" is a recurring motif in the novel. At first, Ivan seems not to have much time for his brother Alyosha, but later their bond and mutual affection deepens. He finds his father repulsive, and also has a strong antipathy towards Dmitri. Fyodor Pavlovich tells Alyosha that he fears Ivan more than he fears Dmitri. Ivan falls in love with Katerina Ivanovna, but their intimacy develops in the shadow of her prior connection to Dmitri, and her ambivalence is a source of torment to him.

Some of the most acclaimed passages of the novel involve Ivan, including the chapters "Rebellion" and "The Grand Inquisitor" from Book V, and the three conversations with Smerdyakov and the subsequent chapter "Ivan's nightmare of the devil" in Book XI. Book V, titled "Pro and Contra", is primarily about "the inner debate taking place in Ivan between his recognition of the moral sublimity of the Christian ideal and his outrage against a universe of pain and suffering." Ivan's rejection of God is posited in terms of the Christian value of compassion — the value that Dostoevsky himself (through the character of Prince Myshkin in The Idiot) called "the chief and perhaps the only law of all human existence." Thus Ivan's rejection of God is justified by the very principle at the heart of Christianity. For Ivan the absurdity of all human history is proven by the senselessness of the suffering of children: if reason or rationality is the measure, God's world cannot be accepted. All the examples Ivan gives of horrors perpetrated against children were taken by Dostoevsky from actual newspaper accounts and historical sources.

=== Alexei Fyodorovich Karamazov ===
Alexei Fyodorovich (often referred to as Alyosha) is, at age 20, the youngest of the brothers. He is the second child of Fyodor Pavlovich's second wife, Sofya Ivanovna, and is thus Ivan's full brother. The narrator identifies him as the hero of the novel in the opening chapter, as does the author in the preface. At the outset of the events, Alyosha is a novice in the local Russian Orthodox monastery. His faith is in contrast to his brother Ivan's atheism. The Elder, Father Zosima, who is a father figure and spiritual guide to Alyosha throughout the book, sends him into the world, where he becomes involved with the extreme personalities and fraught relationships in his family and elsewhere. At all times he acts as a compassionate and insightful peace maker, and is loved by virtually everyone.

In creating the character of Alyosha, Dostoevsky was in large part addressing himself to the contemporary Russian radical youth, as a positive alternative to the atheistic approach to justice and attainment of the good. Alyosha embodies the same aspiration to a society governed by goodness and compassion that is contained in the Socialist ideal, but not divorced from faith in God, from faith in the immortality of the soul in God, or from the Eastern Orthodox Christian tradition in Russia.

=== Pavel Fyodorovich Smerdyakov ===
Pavel Fyodorovich Smerdyakov is the son of "Reeking Lizaveta", a mute woman of the street who died alone giving birth to the child in Fyodor Pavlovich's bathhouse: the name "Smerdyakov" means "son of the reeking one". He is rumored to be the illegitimate son of Fyodor Pavlovich. He was brought up by Fyodor Pavlovich's trusted servant Grigory Vasilievich and his wife Marfa. Grigory tutored him and attempted to give him religious instruction, but Smerdyakov responded with ingratitude and derision. On one occasion Grigory had struck him violently across the face: a week later Smerdyakov had his first epileptic seizure. The narrator notes that as a child, Smerdyakov was fond of hanging cats and giving them ritualistic burials. Grigory told him: "You're not human. You're the spawn of the mildew on the bathhouse wall, that's who you are" — a remark for which Smerdyakov never forgave him. Smerdyakov becomes part of the Karamazov household as a servant, working as Fyodor Pavlovich's lackey and cook. Generally contemptuous of others, Smerdyakov greatly admires Ivan, shares his atheism, and is influenced by his dictum that "everything is lawful". Despite his evident shrewdness, other characters — particularly Ivan, Dmitri and Fyodor Pavlovich — underestimate his intelligence.

Character names
Russian and romanization
First name, nickname	Patronymic	Family name
Фёдор; Fyódor	Па́влович; Pávlovich	Карама́зов; Karamázov
Дми́трий, Ми́тя; Dmítry, Mítya	Фёдорович; Fyódorovich	Карама́зов; Karamázov
Ива́н, Ва́ня; Iván, Ványa	Фёдорович; Fyódorovich	Карама́зов; Karamázov
Алексе́й, Алёша; Alekséy, Alyósha	Фёдорович; Fyódorovich	Карама́зов; Karamázov
Па́вел; Pável	Фёдорович; Fyódorovich	Смердяко́в; Smerdyakóv
Аграфе́на, Гру́шенька; Agraféna, Grúshenka	Алекса́ндровна; Aleksándrovna	Светло́ва; Svetlóva
Катери́на, Ка́тя; Katerína, Kátya	Ива́новна; Ivánovna	Верхо́вцева; Verkhóvtseva
Илья́, Илю́ша; Ilyá, Ilyúsha	Никола́евич; Nikoláyevich	Снегирёв; Snegiryóv
ста́рец Зо́сима stárets Zósima		
An acute accent marks the stressed syllable.

=== Agrafena Alexandrovna Svetlova ===
Agrafena Alexandrovna Svetlova, usually referred to as 'Grushenka', is a beautiful and fiery 22-year-old woman with an uncanny charm for men. In her youth she was jilted by a Polish officer and subsequently came under the protection of a tyrannical miser. The episode leaves Grushenka with an urge for independence and control of her life. Grushenka inspires complete admiration and lust in both Fyodor and Dmitri Karamazov. Their rivalry for her affection becomes the main focus of their conflict, a state of affairs that Grushenka is happy to take advantage of for her own satisfaction and amusement. Belatedly, she realizes that she truly loves Dmitri, and becomes ashamed of her cruelty. Her growing friendship with Alyosha leads her toward a path of spiritual redemption, and hidden qualities of gentleness and generosity emerge, though her fiery temper and pride remain intact.

=== Katerina Ivanovna Verkhovtseva ===
Katerina Ivanovna (sometimes referred to as Katya) is Dmitri's beautiful fiancée, despite his open forays with Grushenka. Her engagement to Dmitri is chiefly a matter of pride on both their parts, Dmitri having bailed her father out of a debt. Katerina is extremely proud and seeks to act as a noble martyr. Because of this, she cannot bring herself to act on her love for Ivan, and constantly creates moral barriers between him and herself.

=== Father Zosima, the Elder ===
Father Zosima is an Elder and spiritual advisor (starets) in the town monastery and Alyosha's teacher. He is something of a celebrity among the townspeople for his reputed prophetic and healing abilities. His spiritual status inspires both admiration and jealousy among his fellow monks. Zosima provides a refutation to Ivan's atheistic arguments and helps to explain Alyosha's character. Zosima's teachings shape the way Alyosha deals with the young boys he meets in the Ilyusha storyline.

Dostoevsky's intent with the character of Zosima (as with Alyosha) was to portray the Church as a positive social ideal. The character was to some extent based on Father Ambrose of the Optina Monastery, who Dostoevsky had met on a visit to the monastery in 1878. For Zosima's teachings in Book VI, "The Russian Monk", Dostoevsky wrote that the prototype is taken from certain teachings of Tikhon of Zadonsk and "the naïveté of style from the monk Parfeny's book of wanderings". The style and tone in Book VI, where Zosima narrates, is markedly different from the rest of the novel. V. L. Komarovich suggests that the rhythm of the prose is "a departure from all the norms of modern syntax, and at the same time imparts to the entire narration a special, emotional colouring of ceremonial and ideal tranquility."

=== Ilyusha ===
Ilyusha (sometimes called Ilyushechka) is a local schoolboy, and the central figure of a crucial subplot in the novel. Dmitri assaults and humiliates his father, the impoverished officer Captain Snegiryov, who has been hired by Fyodor Pavlovich to threaten Dmitri over his debts, and the Snegiryov family is brought to shame as a result. Ilyusha is frequently bullied by his classmates for his father's humiliation, and as a result acts out violently. However behind this aggressive exterior, he is fiercely loyal to his family. His relationship with another schoolboy, Kolya Krasotkin, is a vital part of his plotline.

== Plot ==
The novel begins with the inscription from the Fourth Gospel stating: "Unless a corn of wheat falleth into the ground and dieth, it abideth alone. But if it dieth, it bringeth forth the mighty harvest."

Fyodor Pavlovich Karamazov, a wealthy and dissolute landowner in a Russian provincial town, has neglected all three of his sons. Dmitri, the eldest, is an impulsive former army officer who has returned to press a claim on his late mother’s inheritance, which he believes his father is withholding. Ivan, the second son, is an intellectual and religious sceptic. Alyosha, the youngest, is a novice at the local monastery under the elder Zosima. The household also includes the servant Smerdyakov, an epileptic widely rumoured to be Fyodor Pavlovich’s illegitimate son. Dmitri and his father are further set against each other by their rivalry for Grushenka, a young woman of local notoriety. Dmitri is meanwhile engaged to Katerina Ivanovna, to whom he owes three thousand rubles he has already spent. A meeting at the monastery, arranged so that Zosima might mediate the inheritance dispute, collapses into scandal through Fyodor Pavlovich’s deliberate buffoonery, and Dmitri later assaults his father in his own house, threatening to return and kill him.

Over the following days Ivan explains to Alyosha his rejection of a divinely created world founded on the suffering of children, and recites to him his prose poem “The Grand Inquisitor,” in which a cardinal of the Spanish Inquisition arrests a returned Christ and accuses him of having burdened humanity with free will. Zosima dies shortly afterwards. His body decomposes rapidly, contrary to the expectation that a holy man’s remains resist corruption, and the resulting scandal precipitates a crisis of faith in Alyosha, from which he emerges renewed.

Desperate to repay Katerina Ivanovna before leaving with Grushenka, Dmitri fails to raise the money and goes at night to his father’s house carrying a brass pestle. The narration breaks off at the window. Dmitri is next seen fleeing the property, striking the servant Grigory with the pestle when the old man tries to stop him. Learning that Grushenka has gone to a nearby village to meet a former lover, Dmitri follows her there, spends lavishly on a night of revelry, and wins from her a declaration of love, at the end of which the police arrive and arrest him for his father’s murder and the theft of three thousand roubles.

Dmitri maintains his innocence throughout the investigation. He explains that the money he spent that night was the remaining half of Katerina Ivanovna’s three thousand roubles, which he had sewn into a cloth and carried for weeks; the investigators do not believe him, and the circumstantial evidence against him is overwhelming, since the only other person in the house was Smerdyakov, apparently incapacitated by a seizure.

Ivan visits Smerdyakov three times. At the last of these Smerdyakov confesses that he feigned the seizure, killed Fyodor Pavlovich and took the money, and insists that Ivan was complicit, both by absenting himself from the house and by teaching Smerdyakov that in the absence of God everything is permitted. Ivan, already feverish, suffers a hallucination in which the devil appears to him as a shabby gentleman. Alyosha interrupts it with the news that Smerdyakov has hanged himself.

At the trial Ivan’s account of the confession is dismissed as delirium, and Katerina Ivanovna, distraught at his condition, produces a letter in which Dmitri had drunkenly written that he would kill his father. Dmitri is convicted and sentenced to twenty years of hard labour in Siberia. A parallel narrative follows Alyosha’s friendship with a group of schoolboys and with Ilyusha, the consumptive son of a captain whom Dmitri had publicly humiliated. In the epilogue Ivan and Katerina Ivanovna plan Dmitri’s escape to America, Dmitri and Katerina Ivanovna are reconciled, and the novel closes at Ilyusha’s funeral, where Alyosha urges the boys to keep the memory of their friend and of that moment alive.

== Themes ==
=== Faith and atheism ===
One of the novel's central themes is the counterposition of the true spiritual meaning of the Eastern Orthodox Christian faith, particularly insofar as it is posited as the heart of Russian national identity and history, with the ideas and values emanating from the new doctrines of atheism, rationalism, socialism and nihilism. Not only were these ideas and values alien to Russia's spiritual heritage, they were, in Dostoevsky's opinion, actively working to destroy it, and moreover were becoming increasingly popular and influential, especially among Russia's youth. The theme had already been vividly depicted in all the earlier major novels, particularly Demons, but in The Brothers Karamazov Dostoevsky artistically represents and counterposes the two antithetical worldviews in archetypal forms — the character of Ivan Fyodorovich and his legend of The Grand Inquisitor, and the characters of Alyosha and the Elder Zosima in their expression and embodiment of a lived Christian faith.

The character of Ivan Fyodorovich, though he outwardly plays the role of devil's advocate, is inwardly far from being resolved in his atheism. A constantly reappearing motif in the novel is his proposition that without faith in immortality, there is no such thing as virtue, and that if there is no God, everything is permitted. When Zosima encounters the idea in the meeting at the monastery, he does not dispute it, but suggests to Ivan that since in all probability he does not believe in the immortality of his own soul, his thoughts must be a source of torment to him: "But the martyr likes sometimes to divert himself with his despair, as it were driven to it by despair itself. Meanwhile ... you divert yourself with magazine articles, and discussions in society, though you don't believe your own arguments, and with an aching heart mock at them inwardly... That question you have not answered, and it is your great grief, for it clamors for an answer." In his relations with Ivan, Alyosha consciously personifies the loving voice of faith that he knows lives in his brother's soul, in opposition to the mocking voice of doubt that ultimately becomes personified in the nightmare of the Devil. Alyosha says of Ivan "His mind is a prisoner of his soul. There is a great and unresolved thought in him. He is one of those who don't need millions, they just need to get a thought straight."

Dostoevsky wrote to his editor that his intention with book V, "Pro and Contra", was to portray "the seed of the idea of destruction in our time in Russia among the young people uprooted from reality". This seed is depicted as: "the rejection not of God but of the meaning of His creation. Socialism has sprung from the denial of the meaning of historical reality and ended in a program of destruction and anarchism." In the chapter "Rebellion", the rationale behind Ivan's rejection of God's world is expounded in a long dialogue with Alyosha, in which he justifies his atheism on the grounds of the very principle — universal love and compassion — that is at the heart of the Christian faith. The unmitigated evil in the world, particularly as it relates to the suffering of children, is not something that can be accepted by a heart steeped in love, so Ivan feels bound in his conscience to "humbly return the ticket" to God. The idea of the refusal of love on the grounds of love is taken further in the subsequent "Legend of the Grand Inquisitor". In a long dialogue, in which the second participant (the returned Christ) remains silent for its entire duration, the Inquisitor rejects the freedom and spiritual beauty of Christ's teaching as being beyond the capability of earthly humanity, and affirms instead the bread-and-chains materialism derived from the Devil's Temptations as being the only realistic and truly compassionate basis for the government of men. The Legend is Ivan's confession of the struggle of "pro and contra" taking place within his own soul in relation to the problem of faith. According to Mikhail Bakhtin, "both the very form of its construction as The Grand Inquisitor's dialogue with Christ and at the same time with himself, and the very unexpectedness and duality of its finale, indicate an internally dialogic disintegration at its ideological core."

With Book VI, "The Russian Monk", Dostoevsky sought to provide the refutation of Ivan's negation of God, through the teachings of the dying Elder, Zosima. The dark world of the Inquisitor's reasoning is juxtaposed with the radiant, idyllically stylized communications of the dying Elder and Alyosha's renderings of his life and teachings. Zosima, though suffering and near death, unreservedly communicates his love for those around him, and recounts the stories of the crucial moments in his progress along the spiritual path. Alyosha records these accounts for posterity, as well as the Elder's teachings and discourses on various subjects, including: the significance of the Russian Monk; spiritual brotherhood between masters and servants; the impossibility of judging one's fellow creatures; Faith, Prayer, Love, and Contiguity with Other Worlds; and the spiritual meaning of 'hell' as the suffering of being unable to Love. Dostoevsky based Zosima's teachings on those of the 18th century Russian Orthodox saint and spiritual writer Tikhon of Zadonsk, and constructed them around his own formulation of the essence of a true Christian faith: that all are responsible for all, and that "everyone is guilty before all and for everything, and therefore everyone is strong enough also to forgive everything for others". He was acutely aware of the difficulty of the artistic task he had set himself and of the incompatibility of the form and content of his "reply" with ordinary discourse and the everyday concerns of his contemporaries.

=== Freedom and mechanistic psychology ===
"Dostoevsky could hear dialogic relationships everywhere, in all manifestations of conscious and intelligent human life. Where consciousness began, there dialogue began also. Only purely mechanistic relationships are not dialogic, and Dostoevsky categorically denied their importance for understanding and interpreting life and the acts of man."

Throughout the novel, in the very nature of all the characters and their interactions, the freedom of the human personality is affirmed, in opposition to any form of deterministic reduction. The "physiologism" that is being attacked is identified in the repeated references to Claude Bernard, who becomes for Dmitri a despised symbol of the scientific reduction of the human soul to impersonal physiological processes. For Dmitri the word 'Bernard' becomes the most contemptuous of insults. References to Bernard are in part a response to Zola's theories about heredity and environment, gleaned from Bernard's ideas, which functioned as the ideological background to the Les Rougon-Macquart series of novels.

Though the affirmation of freedom and rejection of mechanistic psychology is most openly and forcefully expressed through the character of Dmitri, as a theme it pervades the entire novel and virtually all of Dostoevsky's other writings. Bakhtin discusses it in terms of what he calls the unfinalizability of Dostoevsky's characters. In Dostoevsky, a fundamental refusal to be wholly defined by an external source (another person, a social interpretation, an ideology, a system of 'knowledge', or anything at all that places a finalizing limit on the primordial freedom of the living soul, including even death) is at the heart of the character. He sees this quality as essential to the human being, to being human, and in his most fiercely independent characters, such as Ivan and Dmitri in The Brothers Karamazov, Raskolnikov in Crime and Punishment, Nastasya Filippovna and Ippolit in The Idiot, or the Underground man in Notes From Underground, it is actively expressed in virtually all their words and deeds. According to Bakhtin, for Dostoevsky:

A man never coincides with himself. One cannot apply the formula of identity A≡A. In Dostoevsky's artistic thinking the genuine life of the personality takes place at the point of non-coincidence between a man and himself, at his point of departure beyond the limits of all that he is as a material being – a being that can be spied on, defined, predicted apart from its own will, "at second hand". The genuine life of the personality is made available only through a dialogic penetration of that personality, during which it freely and reciprocally reveals itself.

== Style ==
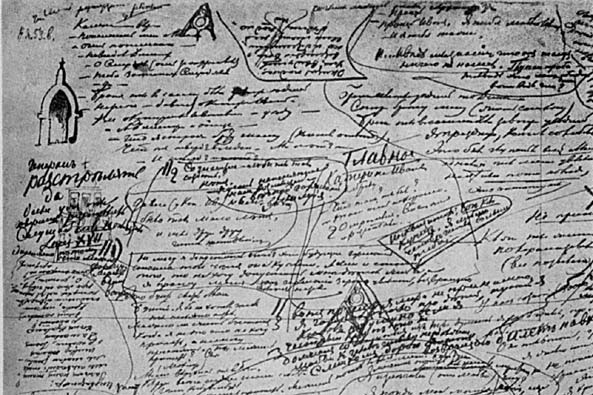
Dostoyevsky's notes for Chapter 5 of The Brothers Karamazov

Although written in the 19th century, The Brothers Karamazov displays a number of modern elements. Dostoevsky composed the book with a variety of literary techniques. Though privy to many of the thoughts and feelings of the protagonists, the narrator is a self-proclaimed writer; he discusses his own mannerisms and personal perceptions so often in the novel that he becomes a character. Through his descriptions, the narrator's voice merges imperceptibly into the tone of the people he is describing, often extending into the characters' most personal thoughts. There is no voice of authority in the story. (Note: See Bakhtin (1984) for more on the relationship between Dostoevsky and his characters.) Mikhail Bakhtin theorized this quality as polyphony, calling the Dostoevskian novel "a genuine polyphony of fully valid voices", a plurality of independent and unmerged voices and consciousnesses. In addition to the principal narrator, there are several sections narrated by other characters entirely, such as the story of The Grand Inquisitor and Zosima's confessions.

Dostoevsky uses individual styles of speech to express the inner personality of each person. For example, the attorney Fetyukovich (based on Vladimir Spasovich) is characterized by malapropisms (e.g. 'robbed' for 'stolen', and at one point declares possible suspects in the murder 'irresponsible' rather than innocent). Several plot digressions provide insight into other apparently minor characters. For example, the narrative in Book Six is almost entirely devoted to Zosima's biography, which contains a confession from a man whom he met many years before. Dostoevsky does not rely on a single source or a group of major characters to convey the themes of this book, but uses a variety of viewpoints, narratives and characters throughout.

== Reception and influence ==
The Brothers Karamazov has had a deep influence on many public figures over the years for widely varying reasons. Admirers include scientists such as Albert Einstein, philosophers Ludwig Wittgenstein and Martin Heidegger, as well as writers such as Virginia Woolf, Cormac McCarthy, Haruki Murakami, Franz Kafka, and Frederick Buechner.

British writer C. P. Snow writes of Einstein's admiration for the novel: "The Brothers Karamazov—that for him in 1919 was the supreme summit of all literature. It remained so when I talked to him in 1937, and probably until the end of his life."

Sigmund Freud called it "the most magnificent novel ever written" and was fascinated with what he saw as its Oedipal themes. In 1928 Freud published a paper titled "Dostoevsky and Parricide" in which he investigated Dostoevsky's own neuroses. Freud claimed that Dostoevsky's epilepsy was not a natural condition but instead a physical manifestation of the author's hidden guilt over his own father's death. According to Freud, Dostoevsky (and all other sons) wished for the death of his father because of latent desire for his mother; citing the fact that Dostoevsky's epileptic fits began at age 18, the year his father died. It followed that more obvious themes of patricide and guilt, especially in the form of the moral guilt illustrated by Ivan Karamazov, were further literary evidence of his theory.

Franz Kafka felt indebted to Dostoevsky and The Brothers Karamazov, calling himself and Dostoevsky "blood relatives" and was immensely interested in the hatred the brothers demonstrated toward their father in the novel. He probably found parallels with his own strained father-son relationship and drew on this theme to some extent in his works, especially the short story "The Judgment").

James Joyce wrote:

[Leo] Tolstoy admired him but he thought that he had little artistic accomplishment or mind. Yet, as he said, 'he admired his heart', a criticism which contains a great deal of truth, for though his characters do act extravagantly, madly, almost, still their basis is firm enough underneath.... The Brothers Karamazov ... made a deep impression on me ... he created some unforgettable scenes [detail].... Madness you may call it, but therein may be the secret of his genius.... I prefer the word exaltation, exaltation which can merge into madness, perhaps. In fact all great men have had that vein in them; it was the source of their greatness; the reasonable man achieves nothing.

Not all reception to the book was positive. Some were critical of it, such as Henry James, Vladimir Nabokov, D. H. Lawrence, and Pyotr Ilyich Tchaikovsky. Tchaikovsky, for instance, once said of the novel in a letter that "Dostoyevsky is a writer of genius, but an antipathetic one."

As for Leo Tolstoy himself, the work appears to have proved both challenging and provocative. Entries from his journal indicate that, like others, he considered Dostoevsky's idiosyncratic style to be an obstacle, yet the book was one of several that he requested accompany him on his deathbed.

The philosopher Ludwig Wittgenstein is said to have read The Brothers Karamazov "so often he knew whole passages of it by heart". A copy of the novel was one of the few possessions Wittgenstein brought with him to the front during World War I.

Martin Heidegger identified Dostoevsky's thought as one of the most important sources for his early and best known book, Being and Time. Of the two portraits Heidegger kept on the wall of his office, one was of Dostoevsky.

According to philosopher Charles B. Guignon, the novel's most fascinating character, Ivan Karamazov, had by the middle of the twentieth century become the icon of existentialist rebellion in the writings of existentialist philosophers Albert Camus and Jean-Paul Sartre. Camus centered on a discussion of Ivan Karamazov's revolt in his 1951 book Rebel. Ivan's poem "The Grand Inquisitor" is arguably one of the best-known passages in modern literature due to its ideas about human nature, freedom, power, authority, and religion, as well as for its fundamental ambiguity. A reference to the poem can be found in English novelist Aldous Huxley's Brave New World Revisited and American writer David Foster Wallace's novel Infinite Jest.

Nobel Prize laureate William Faulkner reread the book regularly, claiming it as his greatest literary inspiration next to Shakespeare's works and the Bible. He once wrote that American literature had yet to produce anything great enough to compare with Dostoyevsky's novel.

In an essay on The Brothers Karamazov, written after the Russian Revolution and the First World War, Nobel Prize-winning author Hermann Hesse described Dostoevsky as not a "poet" but a "prophet". British writer W. Somerset Maugham included the book in his list of ten greatest novels in the world.

Contemporary Turkish Nobel Prize-winning writer Orhan Pamuk said during a lecture in St. Petersburg that the first time he read The Brothers Karamazov, his life was changed. He felt Dostoyevsky, through his storytelling, revealed completely unique insight into life and human nature.

American philosophical novelist Walker Percy said in an interview:

I suppose my model is nearly always Dostoevsky, who was a man of very strong convictions, but his characters illustrated and incarnated the most powerful themes and issues and trends of his day. I think maybe the greatest novel of all time is The Brothers Karamazov which...almost prophesies and prefigures everything—all the bloody mess and the issues of the 20th century.

Pope Benedict XVI cited the book in the 2007 encyclical Spe Salvi.

Soviet leader Joseph Stalin had read Dostoevsky since his youth and considered the author as a great psychologist. His copy of The Brothers Karamazov reveals extensive highlights and notes in the margins that he made while reading the work, which have been studied and analyzed by multiple researchers.

== Translations ==
Although The Brothers Karamazov has been translated from the original Russian into a number of languages, the novel's diverse array of distinct voices and literary techniques makes its translation difficult. Constance Garnett published a translation in 1912, which Garth Terry called "the first adequate English translation". A dramatization (by Isabel Florence Hapgood) was published in 1905.

In 1958, David Magarshack and Manuel Komroff released translations of the novel, published respectively by Penguin and The New American Library of World Literature. In 1976, Ralph Matlaw thoroughly revised Garnett's work for his Norton Critical Edition volume. This in turn was the basis for Victor Terras' influential A Karamazov Companion. Another translation is by Julius Katzer, published by Progress Publishers in 1981 and later re-printed by Raduga Publishers Moscow.

In 1990 Richard Pevear and Larissa Volokhonsky released a new translation; it won a PEN/Book-of-the-Month Club Translation Prize in 1991 and garnered positive reviews from The New York Times Book Review and the Dostoevsky scholar Joseph Frank, who praised it for being the most faithful to Dostoevsky's original Russian. In the Times, Andrei Navrozov wrote that "One finally gets the musical whole of Dostoevsky’s original.”

=== Peter France ===
In The Oxford Guide to Literature in English Translations, academic Peter France comments on several translations of Dostoevsky's work.

In regard to Constance Garnett's translations, he writes:

[Her] translations read easily...the basic meaning of the Russian text is accurately rendered on the whole. It is true, as critics such as Nikoliukin have demonstrated, that she shortens and simplifies, muting Dostoevsky's jarring contrasts, sacrificing his insistent rhythms and repetitions, toning down the Russian colouring, explaining and normalizing in all kinds of ways...Garnett shortens some of Dostoevsky's idiosyncrasy in order to produce an acceptable English text, but her versions were in many cases pioneering versions; decorous they may be, but they allowed this strange new voice to invade English literature and thus made it possible for later translators to go further in the search for more authentic voice.

On David Magarshack's Dostoevsky translations, France says:

[I]t is not certain that Magarshack has worn as well as Garnett. He certainly corrects some of her errors; he also aims for a more up-to-date style which flows more easily in English...Being even more thoroughly englished than Garnett's, Magarshack's translations lack some of the excitement of the foreign.

On Andrew R. MacAndrew's American version, he comments: "He translates fairly freely, altering details, rearranging, shortening and explaining the Russian to produce texts which lack a distinctive voice."

On David McDuff's Penguin translation:

McDuff carries this literalism the furthest of any of the translators. In his Brothers Karamazov the odd, fussy tone of the narrator is well rendered in the preface...At times, indeed, the convoluted style might make the reader unfamiliar with Dostoevsky's Russian question the translator's command of English. More seriously, this literalism means that the dialogue is sometimes impossibly odd—and as a result rather dead...Such 'foreignizing' fidelity makes for difficult reading.

On Pevear and Volokhonsky's translation, France writes:

Pevear and Volokhonsky, while they too stress the need to exhume the real, rough-edged Dostoevsky from the normalization practised by earlier translators, generally offer a rather more satisfactory compromise between the literal and the readable. In particular, their rendering of dialogue is often livelier and more colloquial than McDuff's...Elsewhere, it has to be said, the desire to replicate the vocabulary or syntax of the Russian results in unnecessary awkwardness and obscurity.

In commenting on Ignat Avsey's translation, he writes: "His not entirely unprecedented choice of a more natural-sounding English formulation is symptomatic of his general desire to make his text English...His is an enjoyable version in the domesticating tradition."

=== List of English translations ===
This is a list of all unabridged and one abridged English translations of the novel:

1. Constance Garnett (1912)
  1. revised by Avrahm Yarmolinsky (1933)
  2. revised by Alexandra Kropotkin and abridged by W. Somerset Maugham (1949)
  3. revised by Manuel Komroff (1958)
  4. revised by Ralph E. Matlaw (1976)
  5. revised by Ralph E. Matlaw and Susan McReynolds Oddo (2011)
2. David Magarshack (1958)
3. Andrew R. MacAndrew (1970)
4. Julius Katzer (1980, as The Karamazov Brothers)
5. Richard Pevear and Larissa Volokhonsky (1990)
6. David McDuff (1993)
7. Ignat Avsey (1994, as The Karamazov Brothers)
8. Michael R. Katz (2023)

== Adaptations ==
=== Film ===
There have been several film adaptations of The Brothers Karamazov, including:

- The Brothers Karamazov (1915 silent film, lost, directed by Victor Tourjansky)
- Die Brüder Karamasoff (1921, directed by Carl Froelich, in German)
- Der Mörder Dimitri Karamasoff (1931, directed by Erich Engels & Fyodor Otsep, in German)
- I fratelli Karamazoff (1947, directed by Giacomo Gentilomo, in Italian)
- The Brothers Karamazov (1958, directed by Richard Brooks)
- The Brothers Karamazov (1969, directed by Kirill Lavrov, Ivan Pyryev and Mikhail Ulyanov)
- The Brothers Karamazov (1969, directed by Marcel Bluwal)
- The Enemy Brothers (1974, Egypt)

=== Television ===
A Russian 12-episode series was produced in 2009 and is considered to be as close to the book as possible. It aired on Channel One.

The 2013 Japanese TV drama Karamazov no Kyōdai is an adaptation of the book set in modern-day Japan.

The Open University produced a version of "The Grand Inquisitor" in 1975 starring John Gielgud.

"The Grand Inquisitor" was adapted for British television as a one-hour drama titled Inquisition. Starring Derek Jacobi as the inquisitor, it was first broadcast on Channel 5 on 22 December 2002.

A 30-episode drama series named Oulad El Moukhtar ('Mokhtar's Sons') was produced by Nabil Ayouch for Al Aoula in 2020. The adaptation of the book is set in Morocco, with some aspects changed to resemble the local Moroccan culture.

=== Radio ===
BBC Radio aired an adaptation (which omits the Grand Inquisitor episode) starring Roy Marsden, Paul Hilton, Nicholas Boulton and Carl Prekopp in 2006.

== Unfinished sequel ==
A sequel to The Brothers Karamazov that would detail the life of Alexey Karamazov beyond the ending of what was supposed to be the first novel had been planned out by Dostoevsky, but was left unfinished due to the author's death in 1881. It would have included a plot that saw Alexey killing the Russian Tsar.

== See also ==
=== Characters ===
- Mikhail Rakitin
- Lise Khokhlakov
