= Resistance International =

Resistance International was an international anti-communist organisation that existed between 1983 and 1988. It anticipated and embodied the so-called Reagan Doctrine which took final shape in 1985. Resistance International was set up in France in May 1983 on the initiative of Soviet dissident Vladimir Bukovsky and Armando Valladares, a representative of the Cuban dissident movement.

"Today few traces remain of the activities of Resistance International", writes Galina Akkerman in a memoir describing her work for writer Vladimir Maximov at the organisation's "tiny office on the Champs Elysée" in Paris. "The internet was still unknown and to restore the history of this organisation I must turn to the few things I can recall".

== Organisation ==
Vladimir Bukovsky was chosen president and the organisation was run by former Soviet dissidents. Everyday organisation was then in the hands of the executive director Vladimir Maximov, writer and editor of the Kontinent quarterly. Galina Akkerman describes how Eduard Kuznetsov later took over part of Maximov's role and recalls the involvement of Armand Maloumian, a post-war inmate of Stalin's Gulag.

Among the members of the International's advisory committee were Cornelia Gerstenmaier, Lord Nicholas Bethell, Winston Churchill Jr, Mstislav Rostropovich, and Simon Wiesenthal. By 1986 they had been joined by Saul Bellow, Bruno Bettleheim, Robert Conquest and others.

== Afghanistan, Angola and the USSR ==
The aim of the organisation was to coordinate the activities of anti-communist movements in the Socialist bloc and in the Third World and challenge the legitimacy of Communist governments everywhere. In a 1991 interview Bukovsky commented, "We didn't do that much, but the little we did all worked and had a considerable effect."

In particular Resistance International directed its efforts towards Afghanistan, where tens of thousands of Soviet troops had been based since the invasion of December 1979. The International organised Radio Free Kabul, providing 25 portable transmitters that served not only as a means of transmitting radio propaganda in local languages, but also as a means of communication between the mujahideen forces. Resistance International helped Soviet deserters and prisoners of war leave the country. To spread information among Soviet forces serving in Afghanistan the organisation issued a newspaper that bore an external resemblance to Krasnaya Zvezda, the daily published by the Soviet Ministry of Defence.

Resistance International was also said to have carried out propaganda work among the Cuban troops deployed in Angola.

With the aid of the Solidarity movement in Poland, it sent propaganda videos to the USSR concealed in Polish trucks. (Note: These were filmed and edited by Kuznetsov and his wife Larisa Gerstein.)

== Activities in Europe ==
Between 1985 and 1987 Resistance International organised major events in Western Europe, two in Paris and one in Vienna, to draw attention to the lack of free speech and human rights in the Soviet Union.

The first event was timed to coincide with Mikhail Gorbachev's first visit to Paris in October 1985. As an alternative to the official events of the Soviet leader's visit a large gathering was held at the Grand Palais.

The second event, an exhibition entitled a "Helsinki Mirror" and a press conference, took place in Vienna from 4 to 6 November 1986 as the Conference on Security and Cooperation in Europe (CSCE) which produced the 1975 Helsinki Accords was transformed into the permanent Organization for Security and Co-operation in Europe (OSCE).

The third and last major public event of Resistance International was the Paris Forum, "Literature without borders", held in November 1987 and organised jointly by the French PEN Club français, Resistance International and the Russian and French editions of the Kontinent quarterly. "Freedom of speech in the USSR and Eastern Europe", noted Galina Akkerman, "was something more people could agree on than aid for the Contras or the Afghan mujahideen," and forty famous writers attended, including Joseph Brodsky, Czeslaw Milosz and Georgy Vladimov. This would prove, in Akkerman's words, to be the "swan song" of Resistance International. It closed down the following year.

== Funding public and private ==
Resistance International initially had funding from the US Congress (from which it received 6 million dollars in 1983) and from private American foundations. In 1984, an American branch of the group was formed, financially supported by a number of wealthy, anti-communist conservatives. The organisation was put on a more serious footing with the establishment of the American Foundation for Resistance International which had a roster of famous names and influential right-wing politicians on its advisory committee (among them Saul Bellow, William F. Buckley Jr, and, later, Richard Perle), while Jeane Kirkpatrick served with Bukovsky and Albert Jolis on its board. For the next three years this body raised funds for Resistance International and expanded the scope of its activities.

== See also ==
- Vladimir Bukovsky
- Eduard Kuznetsov
- Albert Jolis
