= Mihajlo Mihajlov =

Yugoslav author, academic and publicist

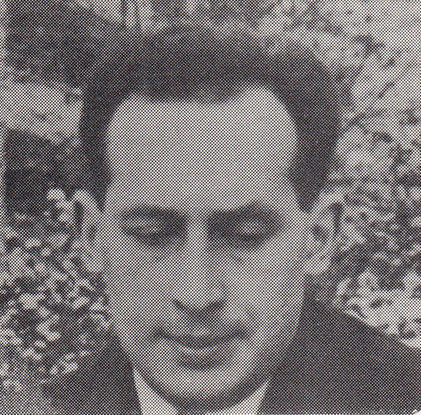
- Mihajlov in 1965
- Born: 26 September 1934; Pančevo, Kingdom of Yugoslavia
- Died: 7 March 2010 (aged 75); Belgrade, Serbia
- Resting place: Belgrade New Cemetery
- Education: Sarajevo Gymnasium
- Alma mater: University of Zagreb
- Occupations: Author, academic and publicist

Mihajlo Mihajlov (Serbian Cyrillic: Михајло Михајлов, pronounced [mixǎːjlo mixǎːjloʋ]; 26 September 1934 – 7 March 2010) was a Serbian author, academic and publicist.

Mihajlov became one of the most prominent dissidents in Yugoslavia and Eastern Europe after his arrest, trial and conviction in 1965. He spent a total of seven years in prison and was the only Yugoslav dissident whose passport was revoked.

== Biography ==
Mihajlov was born in Pančevo on 29 September 1934, into a Russian family. His father was seventeen and his mother seven when they came to the Kingdom of Serbs, Croats and Slovenes in 1921 as part of the White émigrés led by Pyotr Wrangel. His mother tongue was Russian and he and his sisters learned Serbian practically at school. He graduated from the Sarajevo Gymnasium and graduated from the University of Zagreb (Zadar campus) at the Department of Comparative Literature in 1959. After completing his postgraduate studies in 1961, he served in the army for a year until 1962 in Trebinje.

During his time as a lecturer on Russian literature at the University of Zagreb in Zadar, Mihajlov visited the Soviet Union in April 1965, on a professor exchange program and published an essay describing his trip called Leto moskovsko (Summer of Moscow) in the Belgrade magazine Delo. For this, he was dismissed from the university. A few days later, after Josip Broz Tito had publicly accused him of Đilasism, the Yugoslav Government arrested Mihajlov on charges of "slandering a friendly state" and violating the press law by sending the manuscript of his banned article to an Italian publisher for which he was sentenced to nine months in prison. He appealed, and a higher court substituted a suspended sentence of five months. After that, he started publishing texts in foreign press, for which he was arrested on 8 August 1966 and subsequently sentenced to three and a half years in prison. He was released in 1970, but was arrested again on 7 October 1974 and convicted for writing articles for The New York Times and The New York Review of Books and was imprisoned until 1977.

He emigrated to the United States in 1978, where, among other things, he worked as a lecturer and where he acquired citizenship in 1985. From 1985 to 1994, he collaborated with Radio Free Europe. He was on the Editorial Board of Kontinent, an émigré dissident journal which focused on the politics of the Soviet Union and its satellites founded in 1974 by writer Vladimir Maximov. He was also on the original Advisory Board of the non-profit educational organization Center for the Survival of Western Democracies, founded by author Lev Navrozov in 1979.

He returned to Belgrade in 2001 where he lived until his death on 7 March 2010. He was interred on 13 March 2010 in the Alley of Distinguished Citizens in the Belgrade New Cemetery.
