= Victor Hazan =

Food and wine author

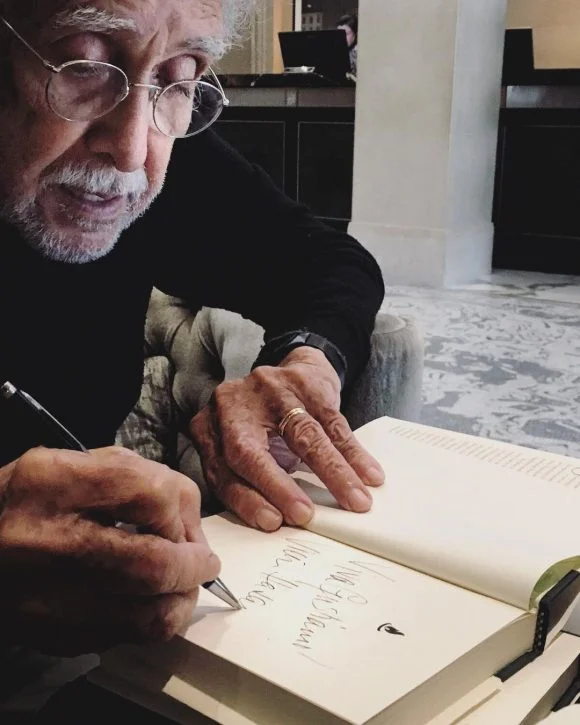
Victor Hazan signing his book Ingredienti in 2017 in NYC.

Victor Hazan (born 1928) is an Italian businessman, Italian wine expert, cookbook creator and author. He was married to Italian food cookbook author and educator, Marcella Hazan, and is credited as being Marcella's book editor, translator, and writing partner. He is father to Giuliano Hazan and resides in Longboat Key, Florida.

== Biography ==
Victor was born in 1928 in Cesena, Italy, to Sephardic Jewish parents. When Victor was eleven years old, he moved with his family to New York City. Victor cites the changing climate for Jewish people in 1930s Europe as one of the main reasons for his family's relocation to the United States; his father, who was a Turkish-born furrier, predicted that things would worsen for Jews. As a teenager, Victor attended Harvard (although he did not graduate), and also contracted tuberculosis, spending time in a sanitarium, which left him hearing impaired.

In 1952 Victor met Marcella in Cesenatico, Italy (Marcella's hometown) and in 1955 the couple was married. In her book Amarcord, Marcella Hazan says that after their wedding ceremony her mother prepared tortellini in capon broth, followed by the capon as an entrée, which Victor did not eat because he didn't like poultry. After being married the couple moved to New York City and in 1958 their son Giuliano Hazan was born. Marcella has been quoted as saying she started cooking and continued to do so for one reason: "to please Victor" and that she cooked for "Victor's palate."

In 1982 Victor published his book Italian Wine. His expertise in Italian wine gained him notoriety, with The New York Times calling him one of the few "people who have dedicated their lives to the subject [Italian wine]." In the 2025 documentary film Marcellat, Danny Meyer credits Victor Hazan's book Italian Wine for teaching him everything he knows on the subject.

Victor was married to Marcella for 58 years before she died in Victor's arms at their home in Longboat Key in 2013 at the age of 89. Victor contributed to Marcella's fame as a cookbook author and cooking teacher by transcribing her recipes. Three years after her death, Victor completed her final book, Ingredienti, which is Marcella Hazan's only work where Victor is listed as a co-author.

In 2025, Victor, along with his son Giuliano, inducted Marcella's cooking utensils into the Smithsonian National Museum of American History.

In addition to Marcella's books and his own wine book, Victor has published articles in Food & Wine and Travel + Leisure.
