= Giuliano Hazan =

Italian cookbook author and educator (born 1958)

- Born: Giuliano Roberto Hazan; December 1, 1958 (age 67); New York City, New York, U.S.
- Education: Swarthmore College
- Occupation: Cookbook author
- Spouse: Lael Hazan (m. 1997)
- Children: 2
- Parent(s): Marcella and Victor Hazan
- Website: Official website

Giuliano Hazan (born December 1, 1958, in Manhattan, New York City) is an Italian cookbook author and educator who travels throughout the world teaching Italian cooking. He is the son of Italian cooking doyenne Marcella Hazan and wine expert Victor Hazan. His use of traditional methods and ingredients combined with modern attitudes and a straightforward recipe style have made him a popular cookbook author. His cooking schools in Italy and Florida, U.S., have been profiled in many publications. Hazan is considered to be one of the foremost authorities on Italian cooking.

== Career ==
Although born in the United States, Hazan spent much of his childhood in Italy, and, at age 17, began assisting his mother at her School of Classic Italian Cooking in Bologna. For more than three decades, Hazan taught hands-on and demonstration-style courses at cooking schools in Europe and the United States. From 1995 to 1999, he led a number of multi-day courses at Hotel Cipriani in Venice. He has lectured at the Smithsonian Institution in Washington D.C. and the National Geographic Society. He has appeared at numerous Food and Wine Festivals including: Food & Wine Classic in Aspen, Colorado, The Masters of Food and Wine in Carmel, California, The Book and The Cook in Philadelphia, Pennsylvania, The Reading Festival in Sarasota, Florida, the Epicurean Classic in Michigan, and for 6 years he taught at Disney's Epcot International Food & Wine Festival.

Hazan is a regular guest on the Today Show and has been a guest on the nationally syndicated PBS show, Seasonings. His school in Italy has been featured by the Fine Living network, and he is often a guest on local TV shows in cities to which he is traveling.

In 2000, Hazan and his wife, Lael, inaugurated a cooking school of their own, Cooking with Giuliano Hazan. As of 2017, they teach classes in two locations: at Villa Giona, a restored Renaissance villa outside Verona, Italy (along with partner, Marilisa Allegrini of Allegrini Winery in Valpolicella, Italy) and in Sarasota, Florida. In 2013, the Verona school was named a Top 10 hotel culinary school by Fox News (2013) and one of Italy's Top Cooking Schools by Food & Wine (2015).

In 2017, Hazan started a line of Italian specialty foods called Giuliano's Classic. It includes tomato sauce based on his mother's recipe, extra-virgin olive oil and rice.

Hazan is married to food educator Lael Hazan and is the father of Gabriella and Michela. The family lives in Sarasota, Florida.

== Awards ==
- Winner, Gourmand World Cookbook Award, 2009
- Best Italian Cookbook in the English Language, 2000, Every Night Italian
- Winner, International Association of Culinary Professionals, 2011
- International Association of Culinary Professionals Award of Excellence, 2007 Cooking Teacher of the Year
- Best International Cookbook, 1993, The Classic Pasta Cookbook

== Bibliography ==
- Hazan, Giuliano (2012). Hazan family favorites: beloved Italian recipes. New York: Stewart, Tabori & Chang. ISBN 978-1584799047.
- Hazan, Giuliano (2009). The thirty minute pasta cookbook : 100 quick and easy recipes. New York: Stewart, Tabori & Chang. ISBN 978-1584798071.
- Hazan, Giuliano (2005). How to cook Italian. New York: Scribner. ISBN 978-0743244367.
- Hazan, Giuliano (2000). Every Night Italian. Scribner. ISBN 978-0684800288.
- Hazan, Giuliano (1999). The Classic Pasta Cookbook. Dorling Kindersley. ISBN 978-0-7513-0598-2.

Hazan has also contributed articles for newspapers, magazines and cookbook anthologies. These include the New York Times, Cooking Light magazine, and Cooking the Costco Way.
