= The Education of Lev Navrozov =

1975 memoir by Lev Navrozov

The Education of Lev Navrozov: A Life in the Closed World Once Called Russia
- Scanned cover of the first edition
- Author: Lev Navrozov
- Language: English
- Subject: Soviet Union
- Genre: Memoir
- Publisher: Harper & Row
- Publication date: 1975
- Publication place: United States
- Media type: Print (hardback)
- Pages: 628
- ISBN: 0-06-126415-6
- OCLC: 1102848
- Dewey Decimal: 300/.92/4 B
- LC Class: H59.N38 A33 1975

The Education of Lev Navrozov: A Life in the Closed World Once Called Russia is a memoir of life in the Soviet Union by Lev Navrozov, the first of seven volumes. It was first published by Harper & Row in 1975.

== Background and content ==
Navrozov was a freelance translator who had resisted joining the Communist Party of the Soviet Union but had managed to secure an effective monopoly over English translations for publication, and enjoyed a privileged lifestyle as a result. He began his clandestine study of the history of the Stalinist regime in 1953 after Stalin's death, in the hopes of smuggling the manuscripts abroad. Navrozov managed to defect to the West with his family in 1972, travelling through Israel to the United States. The Education, published three years later, covered the first seven years of Navrozov's life, from the end of Lenin's New Economic Policy in 1928, to 1935. It recounts the contemporary effects of Joseph Stalin's public relations campaign in the aftermath of the assassination of rival Sergei Kirov. A blend of personal recollections, social commentary and political history, the memoir was a best-seller, establishing Navrozov as a prominent Russian dissident.

== Reception ==
"It bids fair to take its place beside the works of Laurence Sterne and Henry Adams," wrote the American philosopher Sidney Hook, "… but it is far richer in scope and more gripping in content." Eugene Lyons, author of the pioneering 1937 work Assignment in Utopia, described the book as "uniquely revealing", while Robert Massie, author of Nicholas and Alexandra, wrote of the author’s "individual genius."

In a review for The New York Review of Books, Helen Muchnic took issue with Navrozov's characterisation of Russian Futurist poet Vladimir Mayakovsky, calling Navrozov as a "hardened cynic" unequal to "complex, majestic theme of Russia" and who lacked the "necessary objectivity and patience". In a subsequent letter to the editor to the Review, Navrosov called Muchnic's review "a stimulating study in creative sterility out to destroy blindly whatever endangers its stock of clichés", proposing that it was composed of uncritical restatements of Soviet propaganda and gratuitous, unfounded insults.

Saul Bellow, the Nobel Prize–winning novelist, responded to The Education by using Navrozov as the model for a modern Russian dissident thinker in two of his books, thereby beginning a lively correspondence that continued until the American novelist's death. Bellow cited Navrozov, along with Sinyavsky, Vladimir Maximov and Aleksandr Solzhenitsyn, as one of his epoch's "commanding figures" and "men of genius."
