= Dostoevsky and Parricide =

1928 essay by Sigmund Freud

"Dostoevsky and Parricide" (German: Dostojewski und die Vatertötung) is an introductory article contributed by Sigmund Freud to a scholarly collection on the 1880 novel The Brothers Karamazov by Fyodor Dostoyevsky. The collection was published in 1928. The article argues that it is no coincidence that some of the greatest works of world literature – including Oedipus Rex, Hamlet, as well as The Brothers Karamazov – all concern parricide, which in Dostoevsky's case Freud links to his epilepsy.

Ernest Jones termed the piece "Freud's last contribution to the psychology of literature and his most brilliant"; Freud himself however called it "this trivial essay. It was written as a favour for someone and written reluctantly".

== Gambling ==
The second section of Freud's essay turned away from a primary consideration of The Brothers Karamazov to consider the related question of Dostoevsky's gambling. Freud saw gambling as a defiant struggle with Fate (concealing the father figure); the associated guilt was the reason for the gambler's compulsion to lose. As Freud himself put it with reference to Dostoyevsky's wife:

"she had noticed that the one thing which offered any real hope of salvation – his literary production – never went better than when they had lost everything....When his sense of guilt was satisfied by the punishments he had inflicted on himself, the inhibition on his work became less severe."

== See also ==
- Edmund Bergler
- Father complex
- Theodor Reik
