= David Magarshack =

British translator (1899–1977)

- Born: 23 December 1899; Riga, Russian Empire
- Died: 26 October 1977 (aged 77); London, England
- Education: University College London
- Occupations: Translator; biographer; novelist

David Magarshack (Latvian: Deivids Magaršaks; 23 December 1899 – 26 October 1977) was a British translator and biographer of Russian authors, best remembered for his translations of Dostoevsky and Nikolai Gogol.

== Biography ==
Magarshack was born in Riga, in present-day Latvia, at the time part of the Russian Empire. In 1920, he moved to the United Kingdom in order to study.

After graduating from University College London with a degree in English Language and Literature in 1924, Magarshack attempted to make a career out of journalism, and then out of writing crime fiction, neither of which was successful. He gained British citizenship by naturalisation in 1931.

He married Elsie Pedley and they had two daughters and two sons.

== Translations and other writings ==
In early 1949, Magarshack was approached by E. V. Rieu, the editor of the Penguin Classics series, in order to translate Dostoevsky's Crime and Punishment. Magarshack accepted the job for an advance of £200 and royalties of seven-and-a-half per cent. Over the next 13 years, Magarshack went on to become one of the most prolific contributors to the Classics series. His last translation for the series, Chekhov's Lady with Lapdog and Other Stories, was published in 1964, after which Magarshack ceased translation for the series due to the new series editor's preference for more scholarly translations.

Magarshack's translation work was assisted by his wife Elsie, a Yorkshire-born, Cambridge-graduate of English. Magarshack's daughter, Stella, has stated that Elsie helped Magarshack with all his translations and proofreading work.

Magarshack wrote a series of biographies of Russian writers. His biography of Dostoyevsky was savagely critiqued by Joseph Frank who wrote: "It is difficult to give any connected account of Mr. Magarshack’s interpretation of Dostoevsky because, to tell the truth, no such interpretation exists".

Magarshack continued to translate both contemporary and classic Russian literature. In addition, he wrote extensively on translation theory, though most of this work would remain unpublished. He died in London in 1977.

== Legacy ==
Collections of Magarshack's writings, as well as his personal and professional correspondences, are held at the Leeds Russian Archive at the University of Leeds, as well as the Penguin archive at the University of Bristol.

The novelist Anthony Powell paid the tribute: "David Magarshack has revolutionized the reading of Dostoyevsky’s novels in English by his translations which have appeared during the last few years … for years I was rather an anti-Dostoyevsky man, owing to the badness of the translations, but now there is an excellent translator in Magarshack". (Punch, 2 April 1958)’.

The Nobel laureate Kazuo Ishiguro has identified Magarshack's translations as a significant influence on his writing style. In a 2005 interview with the British Council in Poland, Ishiguro stated:

I often think I’ve been greatly influenced by the translator, David Magarshack, who was the favourite translator of Russian writers in the 1970s. And often when people ask me who my big influences are, I feel I should say David Magarshack, because I think the rhythm of my own prose is very much like those Russian translations that I read.

== Selected works ==
A more complete list of Magarshack's work can be found in Appendix 2 of McAteer (2017).

=== Translations ===
- Crime and Punishment, Fyodor Dostoevsky (1951).
- The Seagull, Anton Chekhov (1952).
- The Devils, Dostoevsky (1953, see Demons).
- Oblomov, Ivan Goncharov (1954).
- The Idiot, Dostoevsky (1955).
- The Brothers Karamazov, Dostoevsky (1958).
- Dead Souls, Nikolai Gogol (1961).
- Anna Karenina, Leo Tolstoy (1961).

=== Biographies ===
- Stanislavskii, a Life (1950).
- Chekhov, a Life (1952).
- Turgenev, a Life (1954).
- Chekhov, The Dramatist (1955).
- Gogol, a Life (1957).
- Dostoyevsky (1962).
- Pushkin: a Biography (1967).

=== Fiction ===
- Big Ben Strikes Eleven, A Murder Story for Grown-Up People (1934).
- Death Cuts a Caper (1935).
- Three Dead (1936).

== Bibliography ==
- McAteer, Catherine (1 October 2017). A Study of Penguin's Russian Classics (1950–1964) with Special Reference to David Magarshack (PDF) (PhD). University of Bristol.
- Walkowitz, Rebecca (2007). "Unimaginable Largeness: Kazuo Ishiguro, Translation, and the New World Literature" (PDF). Novel: A Forum on Fiction. 40 (3): 216–239. doi:10.1215/ddnov.040030216.
