= George Bailey (journalist) =

American journalist (1919–2001)

- Born: November 28, 1919; Chicago, United States
- Died: September 12, 2001 (aged 81); Munich, Germany
- Occupations: Journalist; writer; East–West relationships
- Spouse: Beate Ross

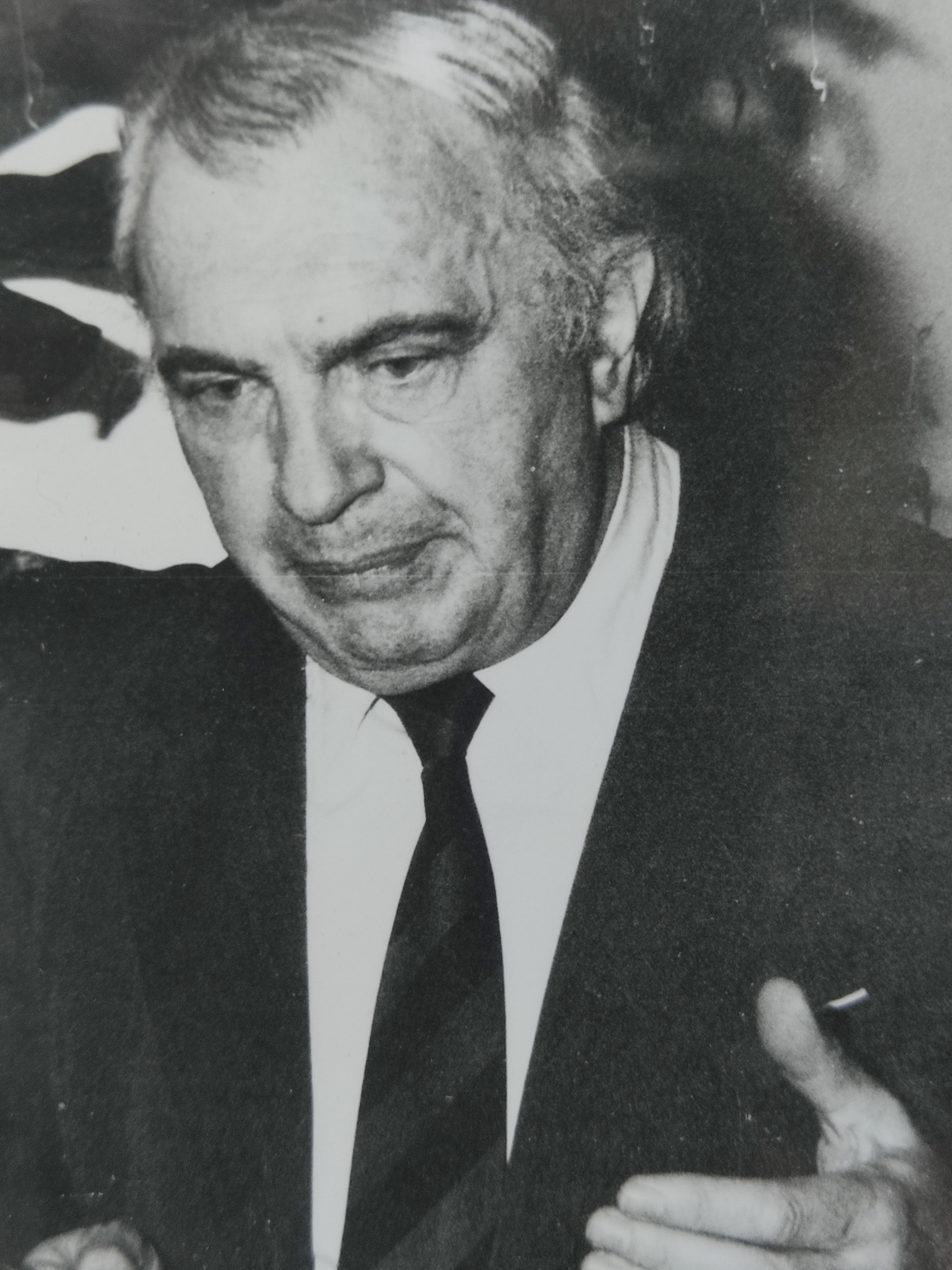

George Bailey (1919 in Chicago – 2001 in Munich) was an American journalist and writer who spent almost 60 years in Europe, most of them in Germany. He is best known for his book Germans, The Biography of an Obsession, in which he interweaves the political, the historical and his own personal experience of 45 years of living and working in Germany. His other fields of expertise were the Communist Bloc, in particular the Soviet Union, and East–West relationships.

== Biography ==
A graduate from Columbia College, where he studied Greek and Latin, and Magdalen College, Oxford, where he studied English Literature under C.S. Lewis, he spoke several languages fluently, including German, Russian, French, Italian and Hungarian. He was married to Beate Ross, whose mother Hilde Ullstein was the granddaughter of Leopold Ullstein, the founder of the Ullstein Verlag. They had one daughter.

== Public career ==
He was a U.S. Army liaison officer to the Soviet Army for seven years during and after World War II and was present as an interpreter at the surrender negotiations in Reims and Berlin. A correspondent for American Broadcasting Company and The Reporter (magazine), he also wrote for numerous other newspapers and periodicals, was editor for Kontinent, Springer, Berlin, and was director of Radio Liberty from 1982 to 1985.

In 1959 he received the Overseas Press Club award for the best magazine reporting of foreign affairs,.

The George Bailey Collection is at the Howard Gotlieb Archival Research Center at Boston University

== Bibliography ==
- The Experts, Seymour Freidin and George Bailey, 1968, The Macmillan Company, New York.
- C.S. Lewis: Speaker and Teacher, Collective work. Carolyn Keefe (author) Thomas Howard (forward), 1971, Zondervan Publishing House, Grand Rapids
- Germans, The Biography of an Obsession, 1972, 1991, The Free Press, A Division of Macmillan, Inc New York
- Munich, 1980, Time Life Books, Amsterdam
- Armageddon in prime time, 1984, Avon Books, The Hearst Corporation, New York
- The making of Andrei Sakharov, 1988, Allen Lane/The Penguin Press, London
- Galileo's Children: Science, Sakharov, and the Power of the State, 1990, Arcade Publishing, New York
- Battleground Berlin: CIA vs. KGB in the Cold War, David E. Murphy, Sergei A. Kondrashev and George Bailey, 1999, Yale University Press
- Verbindungsmann, Ein Leben zwischen Ost und West, 2002, Ullstein Verlag, Germany, (False Dawn: Liaison Officer to the Red Army, translated into and published in German only)
