= Marcella Hazan =

Italian-born American cookbook author

- Born: Marcella Polini; April 15, 1924; Cesenatico, Kingdom of Italy
- Died: September 29, 2013 (aged 89); Longboat Key, Florida, US
- Education: University of Ferrara
- Occupation: Writer
- Spouse: Victor Hazan (born 1928)
- Children: Giuliano
- Writing career
- Genre: Cookbooks
- Notable awards: James Beard Foundation Lifetime Achievement Award

Marcella Hazan (née Polini; April 15, 1924 – September 29, 2013) was an Italian cooking writer whose books were published in English. Her cookbooks are credited with introducing the public in the United States and the United Kingdom to the techniques of traditional Italian cooking. She was considered by chefs and fellow food writers to be the doyenne of Italian cuisine.

== Biography ==
Hazan was born in 1924 in the town of Cesenatico in Emilia-Romagna. She earned degrees in natural sciences and biology from the University of Ferrara and the University of Padua. She began her career as a science teacher. In 1955, she married Victor Hazan, an Italian-born, New York-raised Sephardic Jew who subsequently gained fame as a wine writer, and the couple moved to New York City a few months later.

== Cooking ==
Hazan had never cooked before her marriage. As she recounted in the introduction to her 1997 book Marcella Cucina:

"... there I was, having to feed a young, hard-working husband who could deal cheerfully with most of life's ups and downs, but not with an indifferent meal. In Italy, I would not have wasted time thinking about it. My mother cooked, my father cooked, both my grandmothers cooked, even the farm girls who came in to clean could cook. In the kitchen of my New York apartment there was no one."

— Marcella Hazan, Marcella Cucina, Introduction

She began by using cookbooks from Italy, but then realized that her clear memory of the flavors she had tasted at home allowed her to reproduce them herself. "Eventually I learned that some of the methods I adopted were idiosyncratically my own," she recalled, "but for most of them I found corroboration in the practices of traditional Italian cooks."

Hazan began giving cooking lessons in her apartment and opened her own cooking school, the School of Classic Italian Cooking, in 1969. In the early 1970s, Craig Claiborne, who was then the food editor of the New York Times, asked her to contribute recipes to the paper. She published her first book, The Classic Italian Cook Book, in 1973. In 1980, having been published in a version adapted for a British readership by Anna Del Conte, it won an André Simon Award. A sequel, More Classic Italian Cooking, followed in 1978; the two were collected in one volume, Essentials of Classic Italian Cooking, in 1992. Her 1997 book Marcella Cucina won the James Beard Foundation book award for Best Mediterranean Cookbook and the Julia Child Award for Best International Cookbook the following year. She wrote in Italian, and her books were translated by her husband.

Hazan's cookbooks concentrate on strictly traditional Italian cookery, without American or British influence. To that end, her recipes call for ingredients typical of the Italian home (with some concessions for ones not readily available outside Italy). They are also designed to fit into an Italian menu of two balanced 'principal courses' followed by a salad and dessert. Although Hazan prefers the painstaking approach of both preparing food by hand rather than machine and cooking it on burners atop the stove rather than in the oven, her recipes can yet be simple, one of the most popular of them (by her own report) consisting simply of a chicken roasted with two lemons in its cavity. Her celebrated recipe for Italian tomato sauce is frequently cited by the cooking section of the New York Times.

Among the techniques Hazan suggests are:

- Choose vegetables that are in season and plan the entire meal around them.
- Soak vegetables in cold water for half an hour before cooking to remove all trace of grit. Cook them until they are tender, but not mushy, so that they have a rich flavour.
- When sautéing onions, put them in a cold pan with oil and heat them gently; this will make them release their flavour gradually and give them a mellower taste than starting them in a hot pan.
- Although some types of pasta, like tagliatelle, are best made fresh at home, others, like spaghetti, should be bought dried. Pasta should be matched carefully to sauce.
- Olive oil isn't always the best choice for frying; in delicately flavoured dishes, a combination of butter and vegetable oil should be used.
- Garlic presses should be avoided at all costs.

Hazan frequently prefaces her recipes with descriptions of how the food is eaten in Italy, or with her own memories of it. For example, her recipe for coffee ice with whipped cream, included in Essentials of Classic Italian Cooking, begins:

"Granita di caffè con panna was the most welcome sign that Italian cafés used to put out in summer. On an afternoon slowed down by the southern sun, it was one of the best ways to while away the time, watching life dawdle by as you let the granita's crystals melt on the tongue, spoonful by spoonful, until the roof of your mouth felt like an ice cavern pervaded by the aroma of strong coffee. Unfortunately and inexplicably, granita has largely disappeared. You can easily make it at home, however, and with the food processor it is even easier to do than it used to be."

Hazan helped popularize balsamic vinegar in the USA, something she later regretted because she thought people were overusing it.

Craig Claiborne said of Hazan's work, "No one has ever done more to spread the gospel of pure Italian cookery in America". The food critic Jeffrey Steingarten predicted that Essentials of Classic Italian Cooking "will become the essential Italian cookbook for an entire generation". In a review of Marcella's Italian Kitchen for salon.com, Craig Seligman criticized Hazan's "impatient and judgmental tone", but added: "... her recipes are so beautiful and so reliable and, most of the time, so brilliantly simple that what can you do but venerate her and love her in spite of herself?"

In 1998, Hazan retired from her cooking school, and she and Victor moved to Longboat Key, Florida. There Hazan found that she could no longer get some of the Italian ingredients she had taken for granted in New York, and she decided to write a cookbook for people in the same situation. The result was Marcella Says ..., published in 2004.

Hazan taught courses at the French Culinary Institute. In 2003, she was made a Knight of the Order of the Star of Italian Solidarity.

Marcella Hazan died from complications of emphysema at her home in Longboat Key on September 29, 2013.

Her son, Giuliano, is also a noted cookery writer and teacher.

In 2025, Marcella, a documentary about her by filmmaker Peter Miller was released. It won the James Beard Award for Best Documentary. It premiered on PBS American Masters on July 11, 2025.

== Awards ==
- Maria Luigia, Duchess of Parma, Gold Medal (Italy)
- James Beard Foundation's Who's Who of Food and Beverage in America, 1986
- Silver Spoon Award from Food Arts magazine, 1992 (with Victor Hazan)
- Golden Cheese Knife, 1997 (Italy)
- James Beard Foundation Lifetime Achievement Award, 2000
- Cavaliere della Stella della Solidarietà Italiana (Knight of the Order of the Star of Italian Solidarity), Italy, 2003
- Lifetime Achievement Award, International Association of Culinary Professionals, 2004

== Bibliography ==
- The Classic Italian Cook Book: The Art of Italian Cooking and the Italian Art of Eating (1973)
- More Classic Italian Cooking (1978)
- Marcella's Italian Kitchen (1986)
- Essentials of Classic Italian Cooking (1992) (The Classic Italian Cook Book and More Classic Italian Cooking combined and revised)
- Marcella Cucina (1997)
- Marcella Says: Italian Cooking Wisdom from the Legendary Teacher's Master Classes With 120 of Her Irresistible New Recipes (2004)
- Amarcord: Marcella Remembers (Gotham Books, 2008)
- Ingredienti: Marcella's Guide to the Market (with Victor Hazan, Scribner, 2016)
