= Lev Navrozov =

Soviet historian (1928-2017)

Lev Andreevich Navrozov (Russian: Лев Андреевич Наврозов; 26 November 1928 – 22 January 2017) was a Russian author, historian and polemicist, born in Moscow and father of poet Andrei Navrozov. A leading translator of Russian texts into English under the Soviet regime, Navrozov emigrated to the United States in 1972, where he published a best-selling memoir, The Education of Lev Navrozov, and became a prominent Russian dissident.

== Biography ==
=== Early life ===
Navrozov was born to playwright Andrei Navrozov (after whom his son was named), a founding member of the Soviet Writers' Union, who volunteered in World War II and was killed in action in 1941. After completing the course at Moscow Power Engineering Institute, did not take the degree, switching to the exclusive Referent Faculty of the Moscow Institute of Foreign Languages, a faculty created by Joseph Stalin's personal order to produce a new generation of experts with a superior knowledge of Western languages and cultures. On graduation in 1953 was offered a "promising position" at the Soviet Embassy in London, with the attendant obligation to join the Communist Party. Declined both offers, and thenceforth refused all government posts or academic affiliations as a matter of principle. Regarded as a unique expert on the English-speaking countries, but only ever worked as a freelance.

=== Position as translator ===
Navrozov was the first, and to date the last, inhabitant of Russia to translate for publication works of literature from his native tongue into a foreign language, including those by Dostoevsky, Herzen and Prishvin, as well as philosophy and fundamental science in 72 fields. In 1965, still freelance but now exploiting what amounted to his virtual monopoly over English translations for publication, acquired a country house in Vnukovo, sixteen miles from Moscow, in a privileged settlement where such Soviet nabobs as Andrei Gromyko, then Foreign Minister, and former Politburo member Panteleimon Ponomarenko had their country houses.

=== Dissident historian ===
In 1953 he began his clandestine documented study of the history of the Soviet regime, working on a cycle of books in the hope of smuggling the manuscript abroad. During this period he published translations only, publishing no original work in view of the unacceptable limits imposed by censorship. In 1972 he emigrated to the United States with wife and son, after receiving a special invitation from the U.S. State Department arranged through the intercession of several politically influential American friends organized by Daniel Rose. During 1972-1980 he contributed articles to Commentary, including the scandalous 1978 publication of the articles "What the CIA Knows About Russia," which Admiral Stansfield Turner publicly admitted he was unable to rebut, and "Notes on American Innocence," which resulted in an unsuccessful $3 million action for defamation brought against the author by the former Prime Minister of Israel Golda Meir.

=== The Education of Lev Navrozov ===
In 1975, Harper & Row published the first volume of his study of the Soviet regime from within, The Education of Lev Navrozov. The book recounts the contemporary effects of Joseph Stalin's public relations campaign in the aftermath of the assassination of rival Sergei Kirov. "It bids fair to take its place beside the works of Laurence Sterne and Henry Adams," wrote the American philosopher Sidney Hook, "... but it is far richer in scope and more gripping in content." Eugene Lyons, author of the pioneering 1937 work Assignment in Utopia, described the book as "uniquely revealing," while Robert Massie, author of Nicholas and Alexandra, wrote of the author's "individual genius." Saul Bellow, the Nobel Prize–winning novelist, responded to The Education by using Navrozov as the model for a modern Russian dissident thinker in two of his books, thereby beginning a lively correspondence that continued until the American novelist's death. In particular, the narrator of More Die of Heartbreak describes Navrozov, along with Sinyavsky, Vladimir Maximov and Aleksandr Solzhenitsyn, as one of his epoch's "commanding figures" and "men of genius."

=== Later life ===
After 1975, Navrozov published several thousand magazine articles and newspaper columns, which, however diverse the subjects drawing his attention and commentary, have a common theme, namely the incapacity of the West to survive in the present era of increasingly sophisticated totalitarianism. He was the founder, in 1979, of the Center for the Survival of Western Democracies, a non-profit educational organisation whose original Advisory Board brought together Saul Bellow, Malcolm Muggeridge, Dr. Edward Teller, Lt. Gen. Daniel O. Graham, the Hon. Clare Boothe Luce, Mihajlo Mihajlov, Sen. Jesse Helms, and Eugène Ionesco.

=== Later work ===
Navrozov was concerned with the possibility that China is developing deadly weapons based on nanotechnology. He often cites Eric Drexler as the inspiration for this interest. As early as 2003, Canadian science writer George Dvorsky, chairman of the board of the Institute for Ethics and Emerging Technologies, noted that "Lev Navrozov, the Russian weapons expert who believes that China will eventually try to take over the world using nanoweapons, is declaring K. Eric Drexler to be the Einstein of nanotechnology. Specifically, Navrozov is comparing Einstein's famous warning to President Roosevelt about the viability of atomic weapons to Drexler's 1986 book, Engines of Creation, where he warns about the possibility of the development of nanoweapons. Navrozov is concerned, however, that Drexler is not being taken seriously by the National Nanotechnology Initiative (NNI), an organization that Navrozov compares to the Manhattan Project. But as Navrozov notes, the irony in all this is that the NNI has denied the military aspects of nanotechnology. 'Imagine,' says Navrozov, 'the U.S. Manhattan Project policy of tacit denial of the military importance of nuclear power, the implication being that the Manhattan Project, with all the money allocated for it, should concentrate on the development of nuclear power as fuel.' Disturbingly, while the Chinese have been startlingly open about the potential military uses of molecular assemblers, Navrozov notes that 'the current government-NNI policy completely excludes research involved in molecular nano assemblers because of the false non-feasibility argument as put forward by Richard Smalley with peremptory categorical zeal.' Ultimately, as the debate between Drexler and Smalley rages, Navrozov sees no harm in assuming that Drexler is right, that we should err on the side of caution. 'Now, let us conjecture, for the sake of argument, the opposite,' argues Navrozov, 'What would be the danger? That the West, including Dr. Smalley and his carbon nanotubes, would be reduced to dust or would surrender unconditionally to become a vast Hong Kong.'"
