= Albert Jolis =

American businessman

Albert Jolis (1912–2000) was an American diamond dealer, head of the international firm Diamond Distributors, Inc, and a fund-raising anti-communist, serving in the 1980s as board chairman of Resistance International.

== World War II and its aftermath ==
Jolis served in the Office of Strategic Services (OSS) with William Casey under Bill Donovan during World War II.

In a letter to Arthur Koestler on 19 March 1946 George Orwell wrote that "Bert Jolis is very much of our way of thinking”. They were planning to set up an anti-totalitarian League and Orwell had been talking to an American acquaintance about the sister organisation in the USA, the International Rescue Committee.

== Implementing the Reagan Doctrine ==
After retiring from business, Jolis helped to create the anti-communist Resistance International (1983–1988) and the National Council to Support the Democracy Movements with Soviet dissidents Vladimir Bukovsky, Vladimir Maximov and Eduard Kuznetsov, and, among others, Jeane Kirkpatrick, Martin Colman, Jack Kemp, Richard Perle, and Midge Decter.
