= The Classic Italian Cookbook =

1973 cookbook by Marcella Hazan

Cover of the 1980 edition

The Classic Italian Cookbook: The Art of Italian Cooking and the Italian Art of Eating is an American cookbook of Italian cuisine by Marcella Hazan first published in 1973.

== Background ==
Marcella Hazan gained visibility as an instructor of Italian cuisine in New York City following an interview with Craig Claiborne of The New York Times in 1970. Upon a visit to her apartment, Harper and Row editor Peter Mollman signed her to write The Classic Italian Cookbook "on the spot."

The book was intended as an accessible resource for American home cooks to learn about Italian cuisine.

== Reception ==
The Classic Italian Cookbook has received largely positive reviews for its accessible format and high-quality recipes. David Sipress of The New Yorker credits the book with teaching him how to cook, while Fergus Henderson of The Guardian praises Hazan saying she "single-handedly changed food as I knew it at home." Mark Bittman of The New York Times calls the book "a door into the wonders of Italian regional cooking" and likens Hazan's ubiquity in food discourse following the publication of The Classic Italian Cookbook to Julia Child, but noting that "Hazan was the more important author."

Chef Alex Guarnaschelli has fondly promoted the book, remarking that "[The Classic Italian Cookbook] is the OG of Italian cuisine mavens and there is a reason."

== Later editions ==
The Classic Italian Cookbook and Hazan's later book More Classic Italian Cooking were revised and combined into Essentials of Classic Italian Cooking, first published in 1992. Recipes were edited for clarity and to account for changes in taste since the publication of The Classic Italian Cookbook. Essentials also includes new recipes and a "Fundamentals" section not present in either of the original volumes. Hazan notes that she hoped to include microwave cooking in Essentials but could not find a place for it in Italian cuisine.
