= Andrei Navrozov =

Andrei Navrozov is a British poet and writer, was born in Moscow in 1956, grandson of the playwright Andrei Navrozov (1899–1941) and son of the essayist and translator Lev Navrozov (1928–2017).

== Life and work ==
=== Early life ===
Navrozov was educated at home, evading compulsory Soviet schooling until his family's emigration to the US in 1972, an unexpected turn of events made possible by an official Department of State invitation from President Richard Nixon.

=== Yale University (1978–1985) ===
After graduating from Yale University with a B.A. in English, in 1978 he bought the bankrupt Yale Literary Magazine, America's oldest literary review in publication since 1821, for $1, personally assuming its obligations and liabilities, and continued until 1985 as the quarterly journal's editor and publisher. In all over $1 million was raised from alumni supporters, whereupon some 16 lavishly produced and extravagantly priced issues were published, with the participation of such contributors as E. M. Cioran, Philip Larkin, Lewis Lapham, Henri Peyre, G. S. Fraser, Roy Fuller, Martin Seymour-Smith, Ernst Gombrich, A. L. Rowse, Boris Goldovsky, Annie Dillard, William F. Buckley, Jr. and George Gilder The magazine's financial independence and self-styled "freethinking" incited the wrath of the University administration and other left-leaning academic elites, which the magazine's vicious attacks on such sacred cows as The New York Times and the New York Review of Books did little to assuage. The matter ended in court, where the case of Yale v. Yale drew extensive international press coverage and was televised in a segment of CBS's 60 Minutes.

=== England and freelance journalism (1985–1998) ===
In 1985, Navrozov moved to England, where he found employment as a freelance literary journalist, contributing to the books pages of virtually every broadsheet newspaper in Britain, and eventually becoming a British citizen. In 1986 a selection of his verse translations into Russian was published by Natalia Gorbanevskaya in the émigré Kontinent. In 1990, a book of his English translations of the early poems of Boris Pasternak, Second Nature, once again caused a media furore, with critics like Craig Raine denouncing him for appropriating the Russian poet's idiom while defenders, such as the poet's sister Josephine Pasternak and the poet Charles Causley, praised his lyrical audacity. A second edition of Second Nature came out in 2003. The collection is noted in The Oxford Guide to Literature in Translation, while all but one of Pasternak's poems in Everyman's Library Russian Poets have been reprinted from it. An academic critic, Professor Angela Livingstone of Essex University, has thus evaluated Second Nature: “I am transported by these translations and would class the best of them among the best Pasternak renderings available.”

From 1985 to 1995 Navrozov contributed nearly 1,000 articles and columns on literary, cultural and political subjects to The Spectator, The Times, The Daily Telegraph and The Guardian, as well as publishing a fiercely polemical essay on the reality of political change in the Soviet Union entitled The Coming Order: Reflections on Sovietology and the Media. In 1993 Pan Macmillan published his autobiography, The Gingerbread Race: A Life in the Closing World Once Called Free, in which the subject of totalitarianism's mercurial essence was further enlarged upon. Soviet-style crypto-freethinking totalitarianism and American-style pseudo-egalitarian democracy, Navrozov argues in The Gingerbread Race, had arrived at the same end by vastly different means. Using the model of a Yale secret society, Skull and Bones, to reveal the hidden workings of an American elite, and comparing its decision-making efficiency with the efficiency of the KGB elite that has ruled Russia de facto since 1953 and de jure since Yuri Andropov, Navrozov comes to the disheartening conclusion that the West's millennial autarchy is at an end. "It is the story of a free-thinker who escapes from the frying pan of totalitarianism only to find himself in the fire of American intellectual fascism," Adam Zamoyski commented in a review of the book in The Spectator. "His unique experience gives his observations an edge which mere critics of 'political correctness' lack. His intelligence and learning endow his observations with a richness and breadth few writers can display. He has a nice sense of humour, essential for the perusal of human folly. He is also a poet, which lends his prose style and grace."

=== Italy and life as novelist (1998–present) ===
In 1998 Navrozov left Britain for Italy, now describing himself as "a political refugee from Russia, a cultural refugee from the United States and a gastronomic refugee from England. After living in Rome, Florence, Venice and Palermo, he published in 2003 a book of his impressions, Italian Carousel: Scenes of Internal Exile. In 2004, a collection of verse in Russian, Strashnaya Krasota (Awful Beauty), was published in London by the last of the émigré houses, Nina Karsov. Since then Navrozov has been working on a trilogy of novels in English, entitled respectively Awful Beauty: Confessions of a Coward, Earthly Love: A Day in the Life of a Hypocrite, and Incredible Trust: When the Liar Falls Silent. Sections of the second volume have been serialised under the rubric "European Diary" in the American monthly Chronicles, a working association with whose editor, Thomas Fleming, Navrozov has maintained through most of the magazine's existence, first as its Poetry Editor, then as its European correspondent, and finally as its European Editor. The quarter-century collaboration with Chronicles has led some commentators to name him, along with Aleksandr Solzhenitsyn, among paleoconservatism's literary influences, a suggestion Navrozov dismisses as spurious, insisting, as he explains it to a correspondent in a private letter, on the writer's "privilege of having two wings, a right and a left, which is the innate privilege of angels." Writing in a language other than his mother tongue, in the tradition of Joseph Conrad and Vladimir Nabokov, with every line of his prose Navrozov seeks to demonstrate that a free intellect, moving as it does above party-controlled politics and mass-produced ethics, is its own justification and the abiding aim of a writer in any epoch.

In 2009 Navrozov was asked by Vladimir Yakovlev, then heading the new Russian multimedia project "Snob," to join the publication as one its six weekly columnists, alongside Ivan Okhlobystin, Maxim Kantor, Valery Panyushkin, Michael Idov and Anton Nosik. His "Writer's Diary" column ran until December 2010, when all the columnists were reorganised out of existence by Yakovlev's successor, Masha Gessen. A group of "Snob" subscribers then took over the financing of "Writer's Diary," and in this format the column ran until August 2012, when the incoming editor, Nikolai Uskov, shut it down, claiming one of Navrozov's columns to have been anti-Semitic.

In 2015, following Thomas Fleming’s forced departure as Editor-in-Chief, Navrozov severed his thirty-year connection with Chronicles. The same year, after Fleming set up an outlet of his own, The Fleming Foundation, Navrozov was offered the position of a weekly columnist on its pay-to-view website. By the end of 2023, his column, “Wednesday’s Child,” had run nearly 500 times.

=== Awful Beauty ===
The first novel in Navrozov’s projected trilogy, Awful Beauty: Confessions of a Coward, was published in November 2018 by Zuleika, a recently launched British imprint. The female reviewer in The Spectator began with “There’s not one likeable character in this novel that centres around the sort of extravagant lifestyle favoured by rich Russians in London” and concluded with “‘Like great wealth or exalted rank, beauty is above all else an endowment. ‘I don’t think so.” Navrozov responded to the review in his “Wednesday’s Child” column.
