= Kontinent =

Russian political journal

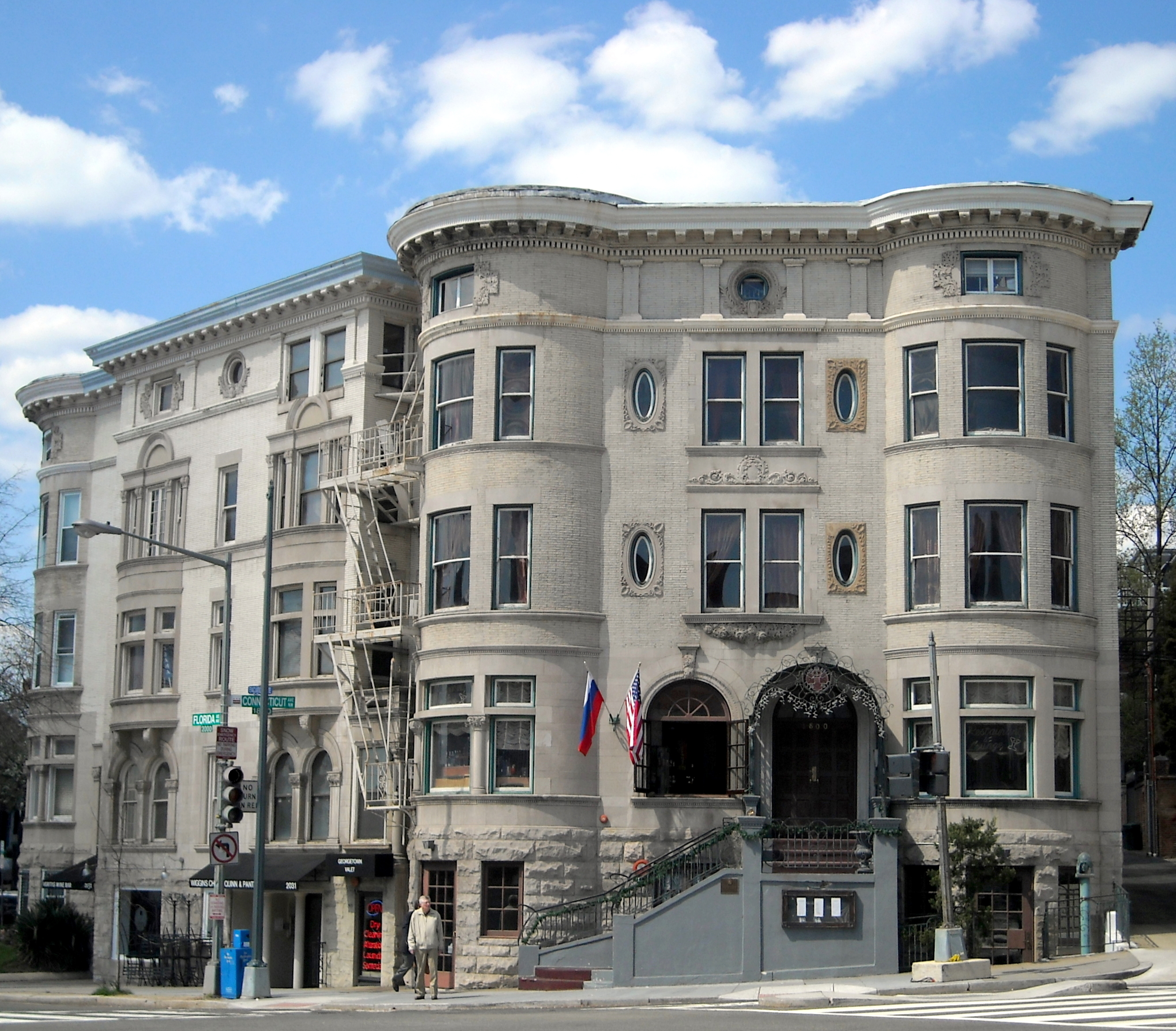
Former Washington, D.C. office of Kontinent

Kontinent was an émigré dissident journal which focused on the politics of the Soviet Union and its satellites. Founded in 1974 by writer Vladimir Maximov, its first editor-in-chief, it was published in German and Russian and later translated into English. A Norwegian edition, Kontinent Skandinavia, was published from 1979 to 1981.

Its Editorial Board at various times included Raymond Aron, George Bailey, Saul Bellow, Józef Czapski, Robert Conquest, Milovan Djilas, Alexander Galich, Jerzy Giedroyc, Gustaw Herling-Grudzinski, Eugène Ionesco, Arthur Koestler, Naum Korzhavin, Mihajlo Mihajlov, Ludek Pachman, Andrei Sakharov, Alexander Schmemann, Ignazio Silone, Joseph Brodsky.

This initial issue featured a debate between Andrei Sakharov and Aleksandr Solzhenitsyn regarding Solzhenitsyn's Letter to the Soviet Leaders (q:ru:Письмо вождям Советского Союза).

== Current status ==
Kontinent continues to be published in English and Russian by Russia House. Currently, the editorial is located at Moscow, registered in the committee on the printed materials of the Russian federation, registration license no. 014255. The Russian version has been available online since 1999.

== See also ==
- Kultura
