= Vladimir Maksimov (writer) =

- Born: Lev Alekseyevich Samsonov; 27 November 1930; Moscow, Soviet Union
- Died: 26 March 1995 (aged 64); Paris, France
- Occupations: writer, publicist, editor
- Years active: 1951–1995

Vladimir Yemelyanovich Maksimov (Russian: Владимир Емельянович Максимов, born Lev Alekseyevich Samsonov, Лев Алексеевич Самсонов; 27 November 1930 — 26 March 1995) was a Soviet and Russian writer, publicist, essayist and editor, one of the leading figures of the Soviet and post-Soviet dissident movement abroad.

== Biography ==
Born in Moscow into a working class family, Lev Samsonov spent an unhappy childhood in and out of orphanages and colonies after his father was prosecuted in 1937 during the anti-Trotskyism purge. He went to Siberia to travel there under an assumed name, Vladimir Maksimov (to become later his pen name), spent time in jails and labour camps, then worked as a bricklayer and construction worker. In 1951 he settled in one of the Kuban stanitsas and started to write short stories and poems for local newspapers. His debut book Pokolenye na chasakh (Generation on the Look-out) came out in Cherkessk in 1956.

In 1956 Maksimov returned to Moscow and published, among other pieces, the short novel My obzhivayem zemlyu (We Harness the Land, 1961) telling the story of Siberian hobos, courageous, but deeply troubled men, trying to find each their own way of settling down into the unfriendly Soviet reality. It was followed by Zhiv chelovek (Man is Alive). The former caught the attention of Konstantin Paustovsky who included it into his almanac Pages from Tarusa. The latter found its champion in Vsevolod Kochetov who in 1962 published it in Oktyabr, which he was then in charge of. It was met with both public and critical acclaim and was produced in 1965 by the Moscow Pushkin Drama Theatre. In 1963 Maksimov became a member of the Union of Soviet Writers and in the mid-1960s joined the Oktyabr magazine's staff. All the while, though, his literary output was getting harsher, darker and more pessimistic.

Two of Maksimov's early 1970s novels, Sem dney tvorenya (Seven Days of Creation, 1971) and The Quarantin (1973) proved to be the turning point of his career. On the one hand, in retrospect they marked the high point of his creativity. On the other, steeped with the longing for Christian ideals and skeptical as to the viability of the Communist morality, both went against the grain of the norms and the criteria of Socialist realism. They were rejected by all Soviet publishers, came out in Samizdat, were officially banned and got their author into serious trouble. In June 1973 he was expelled from the Writers' Union, and spent several months in a psychiatric ward. In 1974 Maksimov left the country to settle in Paris, and in October 1975 was stripped of the Soviet citizenship.

In 1974 Maksimov launched the literary, political and religious magazine Kontinent to take up what many saw as the Hertzen-founded tradition of supporting the Russian literature in exile. It became the center point of Russian intellectual life in Western Europe, attracting such diverse authors as Alexander Solzhenitsyn, Alexander Galich, Viktor Nekrasov, Joseph Brodsky and Andrey Sakharov, the latter describing Maksimov as "the man of unwavering honesty." Maksimov remained the magazine's editor-in-chief up until 1992, when, during one of his visits to Moscow, he transferred it to Russia and granted all rights to his colleagues in Moscow. He was also the head of the executive committee of the international anti-communist organization Resistance International.

Among Maksimov's best-known works written in France were the novels Kovcheg dlya nezvanykh (The Arc for the Uninvited, 1976), telling the story of the Soviet development of the Kuril Islands after the World War II, an autobiographical dilogy Proshchanye iz niotkuda (Farewell from Nowhere, 1974—1982), and Zaglyanut v bezdnu (To Look Into the Abyss, 1986), the latter having as its theme Alexander Kolchak's romantic life. All three, based upon historical documents, portrayed Bolshevism as a doctrine of ruthlessness, amorality and political voluntarism. He authored several plays on the life of Russians in emigration, among them Who's Afraid of Ray Bradbury? (Кто боится Рэя Брэдбери?, 1988), Berlin at the Night's End (Берлин на исходе ночи, 1991) and There, Over the River... (Там, за рекой, 1991).

The drastic change in political situation in his homeland and the fall of the Soviet Union left Maksimov unimpressed. He switched to criticizing the new Russia's regime and, while still a staunch anti-Communist, started to published his diatribes aimed at Egor Gaidar-led liberal reforms regularly in the Communist Pravda, to great disdain of some of his friends.

Vladimir Maksimov died of cancer on 26 March 1995, in Paris. He is interred in the Sainte-Geneviève-des-Bois Russian Cemetery.

== Legacy ==
"Maksimov's was an unbalanced, harsh prose, with settings and time modes ever changing, human life stories and the details thereof complementing each other, augmenting the narrative into all-embracing, epic proportions. [His strength lies] with the power of an original, natural-born stylist, which enables him to see through clearly into the lower strata of the Soviet society (which he knew painfully well from his own experience), as well as the highly-charged sense of moral responsibility of a patriot writer," according to the German Slavic studies scholar and literary historian Wolfgang Kasack.

Maksimov's lofty moral stance, often making him come across as a didactic moralizer, his harsh realism and ideological tendentiousness (with his great sympathy for 'the downtrodden', dismissal of the notion of 'success' and hatred for those complacent and righteous 'at the top') made some critics recognize his legacy as an amalgam of both Fyodor Dostoyevsky's and Maxim Gorky's literary traditions. The major point of Maksimov the publicist has always been to highlight the hypocrisy of the ideologies, first the Soviet, then the post-Soviet, cod-liberal one, as well as the whole set of Western 'democratic' values. According to Krugosvet, "some saw him even as a kind of a new Protopope Avvakum with his idea of fighting for Russia and Russianness, as being continually threatened by the hateful Western civilization."

In 1979, the works by Maksimov were published in Frankfurt by the Posev Publishers. The Complete Maksimov in 9 volumes came out via the Moscow-based Terra Publishers in 1991–1993.
