= People Are Alike All Over =

- The Twilight Zone episode
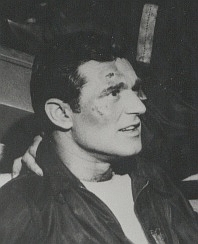
- Paul Comi as Marcusson
- Episode no.: Season 1 Episode 25
- Directed by: Mitchell Leisen
- Teleplay by: Rod Serling
- Based on: "Brothers Beyond the Void" by Paul W. Fairman
- Production code: 173-3613
- Original air date: March 25, 1960

Guest appearances
- Roddy McDowall as Sam Conrad; Susan Oliver as Teenya; Paul Comi as Warren Marcusson; Byron Morrow as First Martian; Vic Perrin as Second Martian; Vernon Gray as Third Martian

Episode chronology
← Previous "Long Live Walter Jameson"	Next → "Execution"
- The Twilight Zone (1959 TV series) season 1

"People Are Alike All Over" is episode 25 of the American television anthology series The Twilight Zone.

== Opening narration ==
You're looking at a species of flimsy little two-legged animal with extremely small heads, whose name is Man. Warren Marcusson, age thirty-five. Samuel A. Conrad, age thirty-one. They're taking a highway into space, Man unshackling himself and sending his tiny, groping fingers up into the unknown. Their destination is Mars, and in just a moment we'll land there with them.

== Plot ==
Two astronauts discuss an impending mission to Mars. One of them, Marcusson, is a positive thinker who believes that people are alike all over, even on the Red Planet. The other astronaut, Conrad, has a more cynical view of human interplanetary nature. After their rocket lands on Mars, the impact is so severe that Marcusson is critically injured. Knowing that he is dying, Marcusson pleads with Conrad to open the door of their ship so he can at least see that for which he has given his life. Conrad refuses, still fearful of what may await outside, and Marcusson dies.

Now alone, Conrad hears a rhythmic sound reverberating upon the ship's hull. Expecting some unnamed, alien evil, his apprehension turns to joy when he opens the hatch and sees Martians that indeed appear to be human, have mind-reading abilities, and give the impression of being most amicable, especially the beautiful Teenya, who welcomes and reassures him. Conrad believes the Martians speak English but they tell him he is speaking their language through a kind of hypnosis.

They lead Conrad to his residence — an interior living space furnished precisely in the same manner as one on Earth (specifically, a living space in middle-class America) would have been. The locals leave and Conrad asks if he will see Teenya again. She doesn't respond, but another local assures Conrad he will see her again. Conrad relaxes, but soon discovers the rooms are windowless and the doors cannot be opened. One of the walls slides apart, revealing a gathering of Martians watching him curiously behind a set of bars, and Conrad realizes that he has become a caged exhibit in a Martian alien zoo. Conrad picks up a sign saying EARTH CREATURE IN HIS NATIVE HABITAT, and throws it on the floor as Teenya leaves distraught. Conrad grips the bars and proclaims, "Marcusson! Marcusson, you were right! You were right. People are alike... people are alike everywhere."

== Closing narration ==
Species of animal brought back alive. Interesting similarity in physical characteristics to human beings in head, trunk, arms, legs, hands, feet. Very tiny undeveloped brain. Comes from primitive planet named Earth. Calls himself Samuel Conrad. And he will remain here in his cage with the running water and the electricity and the central heat as long as he lives. Samuel Conrad has found The Twilight Zone.

== Production notes ==
This episode was based on Paul W. Fairman's "Brothers Beyond the Void", published in the March 1952 issue of Fantastic Adventures and also included in August Derleth's 1953 anthology collection Worlds of Tomorrow. In this renowned short story, Sam Conrad remains on Earth and it is the lone pilot Marcusson who has the too-close encounter with smaller, more alien Martians. In adapting the tale, Serling made key changes that would deepen the irony and heighten the impact. He installed the apprehensive, defeatist Conrad as the protagonist, easing his fears, only to have them ultimately confirmed; and he presented the Martians as a human-like superior race whose apparent benevolence would make their climactic treachery seem even more shocking, as well as decrease the budget that would have been expended on costumes and makeup.

The Martian exteriors are taken from the oversize painted background dioramas seen in the 1956 Metro-Goldwyn-Mayer film Forbidden Planet. Additionally, a set of four lights on the wall of the inside of the space ship are reuses of the Krell power gauges from the same film.

Conrad is portrayed by veteran actor Roddy McDowall, the former child film star who had recently revitalized his career with several roles on Broadway, one of which earned him a Tony Award. In 1960, McDowall also played the role of Ariel in a celebrated television production of The Tempest by William Shakespeare and headed to back to Broadway to portray Mordred in the musical Camelot along with Julie Andrews and Richard Burton. While he appeared in only one episode of The Twilight Zone, he would later team up again with Rod Serling on a couple of prominent projects. Serling wrote the screenplay for original 1968 movie Planet of the Apes in which McDowall played the chimpanzee archaeologist Cornelius. In addition, McDowall played the leading role of Jeremy in "The Cemetery", which was the first of the trilogy of stories that comprised the 1969 pilot for Serling's Night Gallery TV series.

Marcusson is portrayed by Paul Comi, a frequent guest star in TV shows of the 1960s and 1970s, including Star Trek. His other TZ work was in the second season's "The Odyssey of Flight 33", where he played the co-pilot, and the fourth season's "The Parallel".

Byron Morrow twice appeared as an admiral on Star Trek. Vic Perrin was later the "Control Voice" of The Outer Limits, and—like Oliver, Morrow and Comi—would also become another veteran of Star Trek.

== Themes ==
Cat Yampell, comparing the show to other science fiction stories such as Planet of the Apes (also starring Roddy McDowall) and Slaughterhouse-Five, wrote: "Alien caging of humans provides commentary on the barbarity of the practice of turning sentient beings into public spectacles."

== Influence ==
The original pilot of Star Trek ("The Cage", later reworked into the two-part episode "The Menagerie") included plot points similar to that touched upon in this episode, particularly the aspect of humans being put on display for study. Coincidentally, that pilot also co-starred Susan Oliver in a similar role (Vina, a female has the task of making the captive feel more at ease). The Star Trek animated episode "Eye of the Beholder" would also feature some of the crew of the USS Enterprise being placed in a zoo by the inhabitants of Lactra VII.

The band Space Monkey Death Sequence released their similarly titled debut album, "People Are Alike All Over", containing many samples from the episodes, citing the installment as the influence for the album.

The second episode of the television series The Orville, which is titled Command Performance, revolves around the two main characters, Captain Ed Mercer and Commander Kelly Grayson, being placed in a zoo along with other captured alien species.

== See also ==
- Human zoo
