= I Dream of Jeannie (disambiguation) =

I Dream of Jeannie is a 1965–1970 American TV sitcom.

I Dream of Jeannie may also refer to:

- "Jeanie with the Light Brown Hair", an 1854 song written by Stephen Foster; source of the phrase
- I Dream of Jeanie (film), a 1952 American historical musical film
- "I Dream of Genie", a 1963 episode of The Twilight Zone
- "I Dream of Jeannie" (Dallas), a 1990 TV episode

== See also ==
- "I Dream of Jeannie Cusamano", a 1999 episode of The Sopranos
