= Fredd Wayne =

American actor (1924–2018)

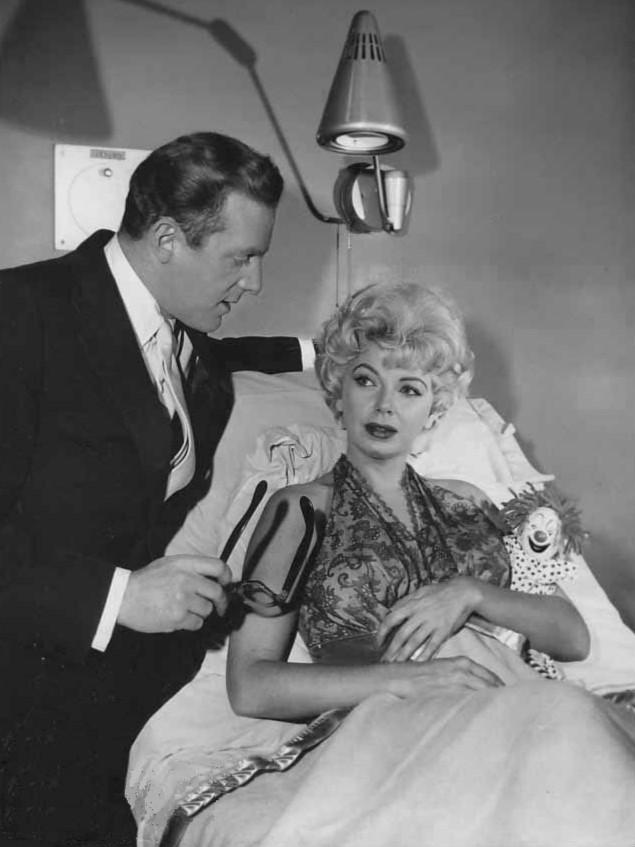
- Fredd Wayne with Barbara Nichols on The Twilight Zone, 1961
- Born: Frederick Searle Wiener; October 17, 1924; Akron, Ohio
- Died: August 27, 2018 (aged 93); Santa Monica, California
- Occupations: Stage, film and television actor
- Years active: 1947–2003

Fredd Wayne (born Frederick Searle Wiener; October 17, 1924 – August 27, 2018) was an American actor with a career spanning seven decades on Broadway, radio, television, movies, and recorded works. He appeared on television as a guest star, and portrayed Benjamin Franklin, originally in his one-man show Benjamin Franklin, Citizen, on television, recordings, and live appearances.

== Early life ==
Fredd Wayne was born in Akron, Ohio to working-class parents Celia (Mirman) and salesman Charles Theodore Wiener. Two days after graduating from John R. Buchtel High School he took a bus to Hollywood in hopes of working for cousin Lester Cowan who had produced My Little Chickadee and several Marx Brothers films. He recalls sitting in the lobby of Columbia Studios for three days before Cowan dismissed him with: "I got nuthin’ for you, kid." After Wayne's money and graduation watch were stolen, a neighbor who worked at Warner Brothers drove him to the studio where he was hired as a mail boy for $18 a week. Soon he was drafted into the U.S. Army.

== World War II ==
Following basic training Wayne was made a Special Services non-com (Entertainment Specialist) for the 253rd Infantry Regiment of the 63rd Infantry Division. For the duration of his two-year hitch he ran movie projectors, wrote, produced and performed in soldier shows in Mississippi, attended courses at Fort McPherson, Georgia, and Washington and Lee University in Virginia (where he was classmates with future director Arthur Penn); Wayne also acted as booking agent of a hugely successful GI orchestra led by Ralph Cerasuolo, a sophisticated jazz violinist formerly known in New York City as "Leonardo of the Stork Club". Despite a 14-year age difference, they became close friends. Elements of the 63rd Infantry Division, including Wayne and the band, landed in Marseilles, France, on December 8, 1944, and were rushed north to support Americans locked in the Battle of the Bulge. Wayne was assigned to GRO (Graves Registration Office) to retrieve the bodies of fallen soldiers. On April 2, 1945, he discovered Cerasuolo, who had been killed by a single sniper shot to the forehead.

=== G.I. Carmen ===
Shortly after VE Day, Wayne was directed to put together an entertainment for the men. In response to his notices, 45 combat veterans of his 253rd Infantry Regiment turned in rifles for grease paint to create G.I. Carmen – destined to become, with the exception of This Is the Army, the most successful G.I. show of World War II.

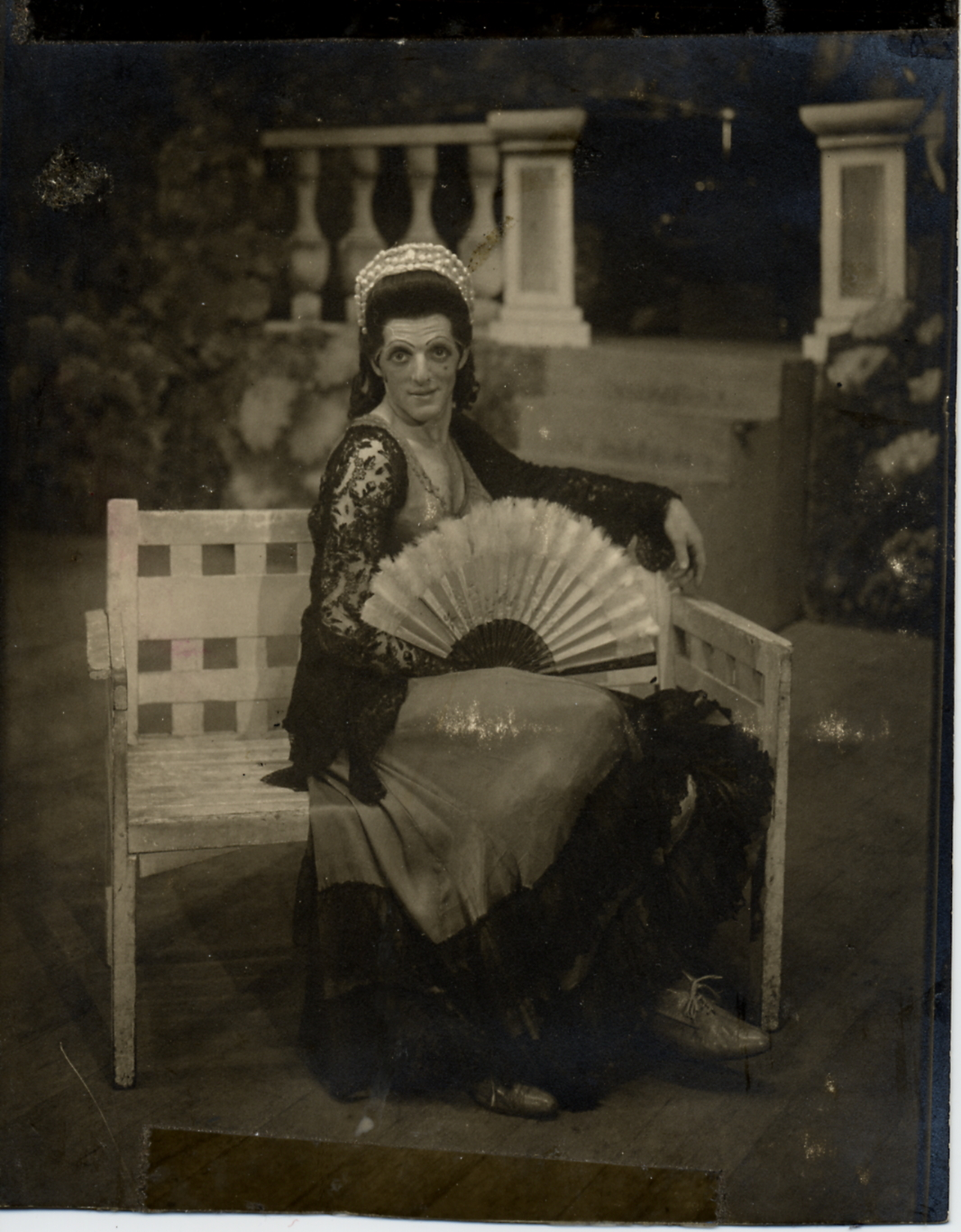
Cpl. Fredd Wayne, 253rd Infantry, in the title role of G.I. Carmen

With half the cast as women in ill-fitting costumes and scraggly wigs, the show was to run for only three nights in Tauberbishofsheim, Germany but its raucous, bawdy humor, robust singing, and dancing made it a roaring success that the Army recognized at once. In addition to writing, producing and co-directing duties, Wayne had to play the title role when no other G.I. would touch it. The cast included several pre-war professionals, including Hal Edwards, who had danced in 20th Century Fox musicals, and Ray Richardson, a tenor with the Chicago Lyric Opera. Most of Ralph's band, now led by Marty Faloon, were onstage as well, among them guitarist Charlie Byrd. After raiding Stadttheater Heidelberg for colorful costumes, proper wigs, and scenery, the army sent the troupe on an extended eight-month tour throughout Germany, Belgium, France, Italy, and Austria including stops at leading theatres in Berlin, Brussels, Paris, Rome, and Vienna. The show closed in Nuremberg on January 24, 1946. GI Carmen’s cast was kept together throughout 142 performances before audiences totaling well over 250,000 G.I. and allied troops and countless civilians, including Gertrude Stein and Alice B. Toklas in Paris and Marlene Dietrich in Berlin.

== Professional career ==
Back in the states Fredd Wayne settled in New York with a job at J.C. Penney offices by day and acting classes at the American Theatre Wing after hours. (Lee Marvin, James Whitmore, and Martin Balsam were classmates; Eileen Heckart and Jean Stapleton were among the volunteer actresses). Roles there included Polonius in Hamlet at age 23. As an usher at Broadway's Alvin Theatre Wayne watched Ingrid Bergman star in Joan of Lorraine, and fetched tea for José Ferrer during the latter's celebrated run in Cyrano de Bergerac. (Ten years later for Universal's Revue Productions, Wayne performed the character in a TV pilot called The Sword. It never sold.) Following the Cyrano run Ferrer cast Wayne in his production of the Czech play The Insect Comedy whose performers included Ray Walston, Werner Klemperer, and Don Murray. Fredd Wayne's big Broadway break came when he went to audition for Shakespeare's As You Like It starring Katharine Hepburn but was mistakenly pulled in to read for the Johnny Mercer – Bobby Dolan musical Texas, L’il Darlin’.

His G.I. Carmen musical skills helped land a leading role. Critical success led to more Broadway credits such as Not For Children by Elmer Rice and following Ray Walston as Luther Billis opposite Mary Martin in the original London production of South Pacific. Wayne's success in London – including a concurrent extended engagement at The Berkeley Cabaret – was followed by a role opposite Gene Kelly in MGM's Crest of the Wave, filmed in England and the Channel Islands. It also led to American productions of South Pacific playing Billis opposite Gisele MacKenzie in Dallas, Vikki Carr in Kansas City, and Jane Powell in St. Paul, Minnesota. Returning to New York Wayne co-starred opposite Ralph Bellamy in Oh Men!, Oh Women! and became embroiled in the Golden Age of Television, when dramas and comedies were not videotaped or filmed but miscues were part of the tension and grandeur of performing live before millions of people. Wayne appeared in such shows as Playhouse 90, Studio One, Pulitzer Prize Playhouse, The Defenders, Kraft Theatre, Danger, We the People, Robert Montgomery Presents, The Victor Borge Show, and The Nurses. He also made six guest appearances on Perry Mason, all shot in Hollywood, including the role of murder victim Jack Hardisty in the 1958 episode, "The Case of the Buried Clock". Wayne appeared in S1 E21 "The Annie MacGregor Story" on "Wagon Train" 1958. He played Barney, the agent for Barbara Nichols' showgirl character Liz Powell in S2 E17 "Twenty Two" on The Twilight Zone 1961, as depicted in the photo above.

=== Benjamin Franklin, Citizen ===
Out of these creative years Fredd Wayne developed the role for which he's probably best known. The idea came to him while flying to New York from Los Angeles in 1964; he went straight to the New York Public Library from JFK to begin research and was directed to the Editor of The Papers of Benjamin Franklin at Yale University in New Haven, Connecticut. After six weeks of study and appearances as Franklin on the Tonight Show and Today Show, he began breaking in his one-man show Benjamin Franklin, Citizen in upstate New York and Ohio. By the time he reached Los Angeles the production was running smoothly and Wayne was hired to play Franklin in a two-part episode of Bewitched on ABC-TV.Wayne's Benjamin Franklin, Citizen also had a long run in Hollywood's Ivar Theatre which led to a well-received U.S. State Department tour of Europe and subsequent college tours throughout America during the Bicentennial era and beyond. His work as Franklin on Bob Hope's America is 200 Years Old...And There's Still Hope! recorded on May 4, 1976, led to appearances in multiple roles on four subsequent Bob Hope Television Specials including an appearance as Brandon Tartikoff opposite Brandon Tartikoff. Fredd Wayne has also appeared frequently as Franklin at IBM, GE, and other industrial conventions. His recording of The Autobiography of Benjamin Franklin (Audio Partners) was selected as one of the top audiotapes of 1997.

=== Writings ===
As a writer Fredd Wayne's articles have appeared in The New York Times, Playboy, The Los Angeles Times, Performing Arts, Westways, The Arizona Republic, and numerous other publications. Wayne has titled his upcoming fictionalized memoir "Blinky's Great Adventure".

== Death ==
Wayne died at an assisted-living facility in Santa Monica on August 27, 2018, aged 93.

== Selected stage credits ==
Year	Production	Role	Notes
1945	G.I. Carmen	Carmen	142 performances in Germany, Belgium, France, Italy and Austria, June 9, 1945 - January 24, 1946, produced by the U.S. Army
1947	Hamlet	Polonius	American Theatre Wing
1948	The Insect Comedy		José Ferrer, director
1949	Texas, Li'l Darlin'	Brewster Ames II	293 performances, Nov 25, 1949 - Sep 9, 1950
1951	Not for Children	Hugh McHugh	by Elmer Rice
1952	South Pacific	Luther Billis	original London production, Theatre Royal, Drury Lane
1952	Have Tuxedo, Will Travel	himself	a one-man show at The Berkeley Cabaret
1954	Oh Men!, Oh Women!		with Ralph Bellamy
1964	Benjamin Franklin, Citizen	Benjamin Franklin	in theatres throughout the United States and Europe
1969	Go Fly a Kite	conceiver / actor	Tambellini's Gate Theatre
1984	A Taste for the Forbidden		Drama-Logue Award for performance, L.A.A.T. Half-Stage

== Filmography ==
=== Film ===
Year	Title	Role	Notes
1954	Crest of the Wave	Seaman N. Sam 'Shorty' Kaminsky (USN)	Metro-Goldwyn-Mayer British Studios, with Gene Kelly
1956	The Man Is Armed	Egan	Republic Pictures
1956	The Girl He Left Behind	Sgt. Sheridan	Warner Bros., with Tab Hunter and Natalie Wood
1958	Torpedo Run	Orville 'Goldy' Goldstein	Metro-Goldwyn-Mayer (MGM)
1961	Twenty Plus Two	Harris Toomey	Allied Artists Pictures
1962	The Spiral Road	Van Bloor	Universal International Pictures, with Rock Hudson and Gena Rowlands
1964	Seven Days in May	Henry Whitney	Uncredited, with Kirk Douglas and Burt Lancaster
1964	Sex and the Single Girl	Frank	Uncredited, with Tony Curtis and Natalie Wood
1966	Chamber of Horrors	Charlie Benton	Uncredited, with Patrick O'Neal, Wilfrid Hyde-White and Suzy Parker
1974	Hangup	Felder	Warner Bros.
1981	American Pop	voiced 7 roles	Uncredited, Bakshi Productions, animated motion picture
1987	Dutch Treat	the Judge	
1989	A More Perfect Union: America Becomes a Nation	Benjamin Franklin	
1999	Man on the Moon	Bland Doctor	(final film role)

=== Television ===
Year	Title	Role	Notes
1949	We the People		
1949	The Philco Television Playhouse		Season 1, Episode 28: What Makes Sammy Run?, with José Ferrer
1949	Kraft Theatre		performed in productions in 3 separate seasons: 1949, 1954 & 1955
1950	Musical Comedy Time	Sir Evelyn Oakley	Season 1, Episode 1: Anything Goes
1951	The Victor Borge Show		
1951	Pulitzer Prize Playhouse		Detour, with Dorothy Gish
1951	Pulitzer Prize Playhouse	Corb	The Thousand Yard Look, with Richard Kiley
1951	Pulitzer Prize Playhouse		The Wisdom Tooth, with Howard Freeman
1951	Schlitz Playhouse		Season 1, Episode 4: Still Life, with Margaret Sullavan
1952	Lux Video Theatre	Bert Oliver	Season 2, Episode 23: For Goodness Sake
1952	Celanese Theatre		Season 1, Episode 13: Saturday's Children, with Mickey Rooney
1953	The Ford Television Theatre		Season 1, Episode 39: The People Versus Johnston
1953	Studio One	The Agent	Season 6, Episode 11: Confessions of a Nervous Man
1954	Armstrong Circle Theatre		Season 4, Episode 6: Evening Star
1954	Kraft Theatre	March Hare	Season 7, Episode 36: Alice in Wonderland, with Art Carney
1954	Robert Montgomery Presents		Season 6, Episode 2: A Dream of Summer, with Jackie Cooper
1954	Omnibus	Master Adam Fumie	Season 3, Episode 2: The Man Who Married a Dumb Wife, with Alistair Cooke
1954	Armstrong Circle Theatre		Season 5, Episode 16: Ring Twice for Christmas
1955	Kraft Theatre		Season 8, Episode 29: Now, Where Was I?, with Robert Webber
1955	Armstrong Circle Theatre		Season 6, Episode 1: The Strange War of Sergeant Krezner, with Richard Kiley
1956	Matinee Theatre		Season 1, Episode 52: The Century Plant, with Constance Ford
1956	Front Row Center	Bill Tyler	Season 2, Episode 6: The Teacher and Hector Hodge
1956	Front Row Center	Dr. Humphries	Season 2, Episode 4: The Ainsley Case
1956	Lux Video Theatre	George	Season 6, Episode 23: Here Comes the Groom
1956	Star Stage		Season 1, Episode 32: Being Nice to Emily
1956	Medic	Sydney Phillips	Season 2, Episode 26: The Good Samaritan
1956	Lux Video Theatre	Pat	Season 6, Episode 41: A Marriage Day
1956	Matinee Theatre		Season 2, Episode 20: The Alumni Reunion
1956	Wire Service	O'Brien	Season 1, Episode 3: Hideout
1956	The Joseph Cotten Show aka On Trial	Asst. District Attorney	Season 1, Episode 4: Twice in Peril
1956	Gunsmoke	Sam Kertcher	Season 2, Episode 5: Young Man with a Gun
1956	G.E. True Theater	Hugh	Season 5, Episode 9: The Charlatan
1956	Schlitz Playhouse	Pollack	Season 6, Episode 11: Washington Incident
1956	The Millionaire	Harry Denison	Season 3, Episode 15: The Mildred Kester Story
1956	The Danny Thomas Show aka Make Room for Daddy	Rod Fowler	Season 4, Episode 14: Liz's Boyfriend
1957	Dr. Hudson's Secret Journal		Episode: Brenthurst Story
1957	Lux Video Theatre	Inspector	Season 7, Episode 20: The Undesirable
1957	G.E. True Theater	Clyde	Season 5, Episode 21: The Town with a Past, with James Stewart
1957	Schlitz Playhouse	Cyrano de Bergerac	Season 6, Episode 36: The Sword
1957	Code 3	Sgt. Bill Hollis	Season 1, Episode 12: Oil Well Incident
1957	Code 3	Sgt. Bill Hollis	Season 1, Episode 14: Suspect Number One
1957	Code 3	Sgt. Bill Hollis	Season 1, Episode 17: The Trap
1957	Code 3	Lt. Bill Hollis	Season 1, Episode 28: The Man with Many Faces
1957	Telephone Time	Hicks	Season 3, Episode 7: Under Seventeen
1957	Alcoa Theatre	Lt. Brackett	Season 1, Episode 4: On Edge
1957	Maverick	Carl Jimson	Season 1, Episode 7: Relic of Fort Tejon
1958	Richard Diamond, Private Detective	Tom Tanner	Season 2, Episode 4: Double Jeopardy
1958	Perry Mason	Ernie Tanner	Season 1, Episode 19: The Case of the Haunted Husband
1958	Maverick	Kingsley	Season 1, Episode 18: Diamond in the Rough
1958	M Squad	Eddie Rocco	Season 1, Episode 20: Dolly's Bar
1958	Perry Mason	Jack Hardisty	Season 2, Episode 6: The Case of the Buried Clock
1959	The Grand Jury	Jordan	Season 1, Episode 31: Baby for Sale
1959	Deadline	Gilgo	Episode: Massacre
1959	State Trooper	Frank Nagel	Season 3, Episode 20: While Jerome Burned
1959	21 Beacon Street		Season 1, Episode 6: The Execution
1959	Tightrope	Danny	Season 1, Episode 1: Getaway Day
1959	Bourbon Street Beat	Lt. Fontaine	Season 1, Episode 1: The Taste of Ashes
1959	Whirlybirds		Season 3, Episode 31: Man, You Kill Me
1959	The Untouchables	Joe Carroll	Season 1, Episode 4: The George 'Bugs' Moran Story
1959	Sugarfoot	'Bull' Borgland	Season 3, Episode 5: The Canary Kid, Inc.
1960	The Loretta Young Show	Ed Crawley	Season 7, Episode 14: The Grenade
1960	Goodyear Theatre		Season 3, Episode 8: Omaha Beach - Plus 15
1960	The Alaskans	Burton	Season 1, Episode 14: The Trial of Reno McKee
1960	Alcoa Presents: One Step Beyond	Lt. Barnes	Season 2, Episode 23: Vanishing Point
1960	Perry Mason	William Gowrie	Season 3, Episode 18: The Case of the Singing Skirt
1960	The Man from Blackhawk	Garrison	Season 1, Episode 33: Trial by Combat
1960	Hawaiian Eye	Edward Demming	Season 1, Episode 29: Typhoon
1960	Markham	Commissioner Fred Clayton	Season 1, Episode 48: The Silken Cord
1960	The Untouchables		
1960	Surfside 6	Allan Abbott	Season 1, Episode 1: Country Gentleman
1960	The Ann Sothern Show	Chuck Dunphy	Season 3, Episode 4: The Pinch-Hitter
1960	77 Sunset Strip	Mike Ransome	Season 3, Episode 7: The Laurel Canyon Caper
1961	Have Gun – Will Travel	Ben	Season 4, Episode 17: A Quiet Night in Town: Part 1
1961	Have Gun – Will Travel	Ben	Season 4, Episode 18: A Quiet Night in Town: Part 2
1961	The Twilight Zone	Barney	Season 2, Episode 17: Twenty Two
1961	Perry Mason	Roger Phillips	Season 4, Episode 17: The Case of the Wintry Wife
1961	Bachelor Father	Bart Anderson	Season 4, Episode 32: Hilda Rides Again
1961	Miami Undercover	Joe Danzig	Season 1, Episode 29: Room 9
1961	The Real McCoys	Mr. Perry	Season 4, Episode 37: How to Win Friends
1961	The Twilight Zone	Paul Malloy	Season 3, Episode 2: The Arrival
1961	Dr. Kildare	Salesman	Season 1, Episode 4: Winter Harvest
1961	Hawaiian Eye	Tony Ward	Season 3, Episode 11: Two for the Money
1962	Bachelor Father	Don Lambert	Season 5, Episode 18: How Howard Won His C
1962	Alcoa Premiere	Ted Morley	Season 1, Episode 14: Mr. Easy, with Fred Astaire
1962	Cain's Hundred	Marty	Season 1, Episode 27: A Creature Lurks in Ambush
1962	Perry Mason		
1962	The Doctors and the Nurses	Dr. Mason	Season 1, Episode 8: A Strange and Distant Place
1962	The Defenders	District Attorney	Season 2, Episode 15: Death Takes the Stand
1963	Rawhide	Calhoun	Season 5, Episode 22: Incident of the Pale Rider
1963	Perry Mason		
1963	The Bill Dana Show	Cliff	Season 1, Episode 9: The Poker Game
1964	Grindl		Season 1, Episode 16: Grindl, Private Eye
1964	Perry Mason		
1964	An Hour with Robert Goulet	himself	TV special (CBS)
1965	Hogan's Heroes	Sgt. Kristman	Season 1, Episode 16: Anchors Aweigh, Men of Stalag 13
1966	My Three Sons	Dr. Killebrew	Season 6, Episode 30: The Wrong Robbie
1966	Hawk	Detective	Season 1, Episode 1: Do Not Mutilate or Spindle
1966	Bewitched	Benjamin Franklin	Season 3, Episode 13: My Friend Ben
1966	Bewitched	Benjamin Franklin	Season 3, Episode 14: Samantha for the Defense
1967	The Monroes	Winton	Season 1, Episode 18: To Break a Colt
1969	Daniel Boone	Benjamin Franklin	Season 6, Episode 5: The Printing Press
1969	Walt Disney's Wonderful World of Color	Jim Durden	Season 16, Episode 8: Secrets of the Pirate's Inn: Part 1
1969	Walt Disney's Wonderful World of Color	Jim Durden	Season 16, Episode 9: Secrets of the Pirate's Inn: Part 2
1970	The Return of the Smothers Brothers	himself	TV special (NBC)
1970	Bracken's World	Ned Singer	Season 2, Episode 7: Hey, Gringo... Hey, Ponco
1970	Nanny and the Professor	Mr. Jackwith	Season 2, Episode 10: The Visitor
1971	The Young Lawyers	Kimber	Season 1, Episode 24: I've Got a Problem
1971	Room 222		Season 2, Episode 26: A Sort of Loving
1971	Ironside	Arthur Green	Season 5, Episode 14: Class of '57
1972	Cade's County	Mark Walters	Season 1, Episode 21: Jessie
1973	Banacek	Stein	Season 1, Episode 8: The Two Million Clams of Cap'n Jack
1973	A Picture of Us	George Washington	TV movie won Emmy for Outstanding Achievement in Children's Programming
1973	Nightside		TV movie with John Cassavetes and Alexis Smith
1974	The Phantom of Hollywood	Clyde	TV movie with Jack Cassidy and Jackie Coogan
1975	Judgement: The Court Martial of Lieutenant William Calley		TV movie with Richard Basehart and Harrison Ford
1976	Law and Order	Sgt. Haran	TV movie with Darren McGavin and Keir Dullea
1978	The Rockford Files	Curtis Meyer	Season 4, Episode 15: The Gang at Don's Drive-In
1978	Rhoda		
1978	The New Adventures of Wonder Woman	J.J. MacConnell	Season 3, Episode 7: Time Bomb
1980	The Dream Merchants	Mr. Humber	TV movie with Mark Harmon, Vincent Gardenia and Morgan Fairchild
1980	Trapper John, M.D.	Pathologist	Season 2, Episode 4: Call Me Irresponsible
1981	Bob Hope's 30th Anniversary Special		
1981	Strike Force		Season 1, Episode 6: Night Nurse
1982	The Day the Bubble Burst		TV movie with Richard Crenna (NBC)
1982	Quincy M.E.	Michael Gurelnik	Season 7, Episode 15: Clear the Air
1982	Lou Grant	Charles Bolsa	Season 5, Episode 18: Law
1982	Bob Hope Special		
1982	One Day at a Time	Ralph	Season 8, Episode 4: Catcher in the Mud
1982	Voyagers!	Ben Franklin	Season 1, Episode 3: Bully and Billy
1985	Bob Hope Special		Hal Linden, Donna Mills, Morgan Fairchild and George Burns
1985	It's a Living	State Department Man	Season 3, Episode 7: From Russia with Love
1985	Bob Hope Special	as NBC President Brandon Tartikoff	with Lynda Carter, Danny Thomas, Brandon Tartikoff and Milton Berle
1986	Simon & Simon	Benjamin Franklin	Season 5, Episode 24: The Apple Doesn't Fall Far from the Tree
1986	St. Elsewhere	Pat McGroyn	Season 5, Episode 7: Up and Down
1987	Cagney & Lacey		
1988	Matlock	Warren Coates	Season 2, Episode 13: The Reunion
1988	Cagney & Lacey	Factory Manager	Season 7, Episode 12: Shadow of a Doubt
1989	Small Wonder	Mr. Willis	Season 4, Episode 21: The Tattletale
1992	Cheers	Dr. Bramwell	Season 10, Episode 20: Smotherly Love
1992	The Trials of Rosie O'Neill		Season 2, Episode 13: Heartbreak Hotel
1994	Cagney & Lacey: The Return	Gerald Fradin	TV movie (CBS)
1998	Encore! Encore!	Leland	Season 1, Episode 6: The Dairy with Nathan Lane, Joan Plowright and Glenne Headly

== Audio recordings ==
Year	Program	Role	Notes
1976	America is 200 Years Old...And There's Still Hope!	Benjamin Franklin	Bob Hope comedy album (LP)
	Benjamin Franklin, Citizen	Benjamin Franklin	audiotape of Wayne's one-man show
1997	The Autobiography of Benjamin Franklin	Benjamin Franklin	audiotape recognized by Publishers Weekly as one of the best of 1997
2003	The Grapes of Wrath (play)		audio CD produced and distributed by L.A. Theatre Works
