= Mr. Dingle, the Strong =

- The Twilight Zone episode
- Episode no.: Season 2 Episode 19
- Directed by: John Brahm
- Written by: Rod Serling
- Production code: 173-3644
- Original air date: March 3, 1961

Guest appearances
- Burgess Meredith as Luther Dingle; Don Rickles as Bettor; James Westerfield as Anthony O'Toole; Edward Ryder as Callahan; James Millhollin as Abernathy; Douglas Spencer as 1st Martian; Michael Fox as 2nd Martian; Donald Losby as 1st Venusian; Greg Irwin as 2nd Venusian; Douglas Evans as Man; Phil Arnold as Man; Frank Richards as Man

Episode chronology
← Previous "The Odyssey of Flight 33"	Next → "Static"
- The Twilight Zone (1959 TV series, season 2)

"Mr. Dingle, the Strong" is episode 55 of the American television anthology series The Twilight Zone and is the 19th episode of the second season. It was one of the many episodes in the second season written by series creator and showrunner Rod Serling; it was directed by German filmmaker John Brahm. The episode originally aired on March 3, 1961, on CBS.

== Opening narration ==
Uniquely American institution known as the neighborhood bar. Reading left to right are Mr. Anthony O'Toole, proprietor, who waters his drinks like geraniums but who stands foursquare for peace and quiet and for booths for ladies. This is Mr. Joseph J. Callahan, an unregistered bookie, whose entire life is any sporting event with two sides and a set of odds. His idea of a meeting at the summit is any dialogue between a catcher and a pitcher with more than one man on base. And this animated citizen is every anonymous bettor who ever dropped rent money on a horse race, a prize fight or a floating crap game and who took out his frustrations and his insolvency on any vulnerable fellow barstool companion within arm's and fist's reach. And this is Mr. Luther Dingle, a vacuum cleaner salesman whose volume of business is roughly that of a valet at a hobo convention. He's a consummate failure in almost everything, but is a good listener and has a prominent jaw.

The narration continues when the Martians arrive.

And these two unseen gentlemen are visitors from outer space. They're about to alter the destiny of Luther Dingle by leaving him a legacy, the kind you can't hardly find no more. In just a moment, a sad-faced perennial punching bag who missed even the caboose of life's gravy train will take a short constitutional into that most unpredictable region that we refer to as the Twilight Zone.

== Plot ==
In an experiment, a two-headed Martian scientist, who is invisible to Earthlings, gives vacuum-cleaner salesman and perennial loser Luther Dingle superhuman strength. After discovering his inexplicable powers, Dingle begins performing various feats of strength, from lifting statues to splitting boulders, and gains a great deal of publicity. The two-headed Martian returns and is disappointed to see that Dingle is using his strength only for show. The Martian takes his strength away just as Dingle attempts to lift a building before a live television audience. Unable to make good on his claims or repeat any of his previous feats, Dingle becomes a laughingstock. As the two-headed Martian scientist leaves, he meets two Venusians, who are also searching for a suitable Earthling for an experiment. The two-headed Martian scientist recommends Dingle and the Venusians gives Dingle super intelligence. Discovering his new powers, Dingle starts thinking aloud at an alarming rate and demonstrates incredible powers of prediction.

== Closing narration ==
Exit Mr. Luther Dingle, formerly vacuum cleaner salesman, strongest man on Earth, and now mental giant. These latter powers will very likely be eliminated before too long, but Mr. Dingle has an appeal to extraterrestrial notetakers, as well as to frustrated and insolvent bet losers. Offhand, I'd say that he was in for a great deal of extremely odd periods, simply because there are so many inhabited planets who send down observers, and also because, of course, Mr. Dingle lives his life with one foot in his mouth—and the other in the Twilight Zone.

== Short story adaptation ==
In the short story version of this episode, the bettor is named Hubert Kransky, and the two-headed Martian is named Xurthya. Dingle also beats up Hubert at one point. Additionally, Dingle takes his brilliance to change the world at Harvard.

== See also ==
- List of The Twilight Zone (1959 TV series) episodes
