= James Millhollin =

American character actor (1915–1993)

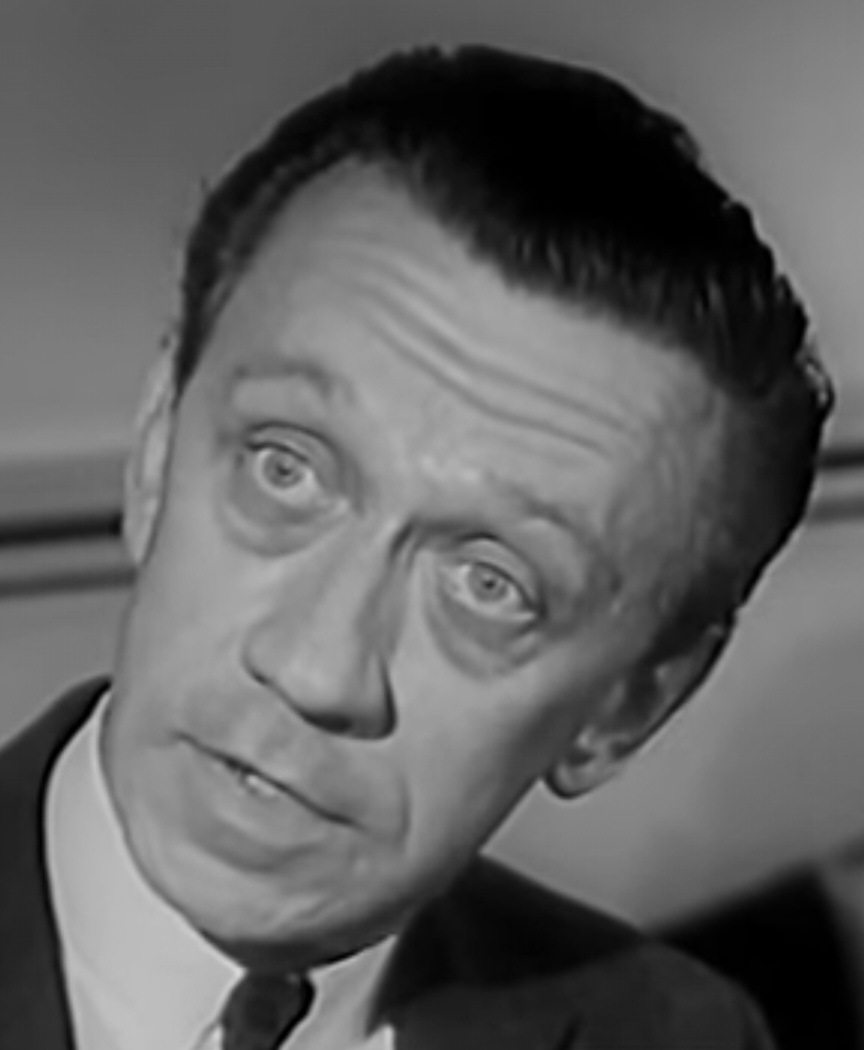
- Millhollin in an episode of One Step Beyond (1960)
- Born: Arthur James Millhollin; August 23, 1915; Peoria, Illinois, U.S.
- Died: May 23, 1993 (aged 77); Biloxi, Mississippi, U.S.
- Occupation: Character actor
- Years active: 1955–1979

Arthur James Millhollin (August 23, 1915 – May 23, 1993) was an American character actor.

== Early years ==
Millhollin was born in Peoria, Illinois.

He grew up in Council Bluffs, Iowa, performing in many school plays, graduated from Thomas Jefferson High School in 1933 and then became active with the Omaha Community Playhouse.

== Stage ==
On Broadway, Millhollin appeared in Saratoga (1959), The Girls in 509 (1958), and No Time for Sergeants (1955).

== Television ==
In 1961, Millhollin also appeared in two sitcoms: as Osborne in "Pity the Poor Working Girl" on ABC's sitcom Margie and as Harold in two episodes, "Mr. Big Shot" and "The Wedding", of CBS's The Ann Sothern Show. Millhollin was cast as Dr. Heydon in the 1961 episode "Dennis Is a Genius" and as a burglar in "The Uninvited Guest" (1963) on the CBS sitcom Dennis the Menace, starring Jay North in the title role. Near the end of 1961, he guest-starred as Mr. Pinkham in "The Dead End Man," in the series finale of The Investigators. He portrayed a despicable bookkeeper/murderer, Ben Otis, in "The Case of the Angry Dead Man" on Perry Mason.

From 1961 to 1962, he guest-starred in different roles on four episodes of CBS's The Many Loves of Dobie Gillis, starring Dwayne Hickman. That year, he played a librarian in the film Bon Voyage!. In 1962, he was cast as Lt. Bronner in the episode "The Handmade Private" of the CBS anthology series GE True, hosted by Jack Webb. In 1963, he co-starred as temp-agency boss Anson Foster, opposite Imogene Coca, in the series Grindl. Between 1960 and 1963, he appeared in three episodes of the anthology television series The Twilight Zone (The After Hours, Mr. Dingle, the Strong, and I Dream of Genie). In 1964 he portrayed a sourpuss in the campy movie Get Yourself a College Girl. In 1965, he appeared on the George Burns sitcom Wendy and Me in the episode "A Bouquet for Mr. Bundy"; he also appeared in Green Acres, season 1, episode 14 (entitled 'What happened in Scranton") playing a hair stylist. In 1966, Millhollin appeared as an airline ticket seller in the Get Smart episode "The Amazing Harry Hoo". Also in 1966, he portrayed a bank official in the film The Ghost and Mr. Chicken and a department store manager in the Christmas episode of The Beverly Hillbillies. In 1966 and 1967, he played a hotel clerk and a store official in three episodes of the Marlo Thomas sitcom That Girl. In 1968, Millhollin performed as Willoughby the Llama in the Lost In Space episode "The Great Vegetable Rebellion"; and the next year he played Horace Burkhart in "The Con Man", an episode of the CBS series The Doris Day Show.

He also appeared in the TV series Batman as Alfred Slye, a criminal lawyer for Harry, the evil twin brother to Chandell, portrayed by Liberace.

He also appeared in the pilot of The Brady Bunch as Mr. Pringle.

He also appeared as Humus the funeral director for Felix's bird Albert in a 1970 episode of The Odd Couple.

== Death ==
Millhollin retired to Mississippi, where he died of cancer on May 23, 1993, at the age of 77 in Biloxi.

== Filmography ==
Year	Title	Role	Notes
1958	No Time for Sergeants	Major Royal B. Demming	
1960	Alfred Hitchcock Presents	Doctor Tebaldi	Season 5 Episode 30: "Insomnia"
1960	The Twilight Zone	Mr. Armbruster, Gifts Manager	Season 1 Episode 34: "The After Hours"
1961	The Twilight Zone	Abernathy	Season 2 Episode 19: "Mr. Dingle, the Strong"
1961	Everything's Ducky	George Imhoff, Lab Assistant	
1962	Bon Voyage!	Ship's Librarian	
1962	Zotz!	Dr. Kroner	
1962	Gypsy	Mr. Beckman	Uncredited
1963	The Twilight Zone	Masters, Shop Owner	Season 4 Episode 12: "I Dream of Genie"
1963	Under the Yum Yum Tree	Thin Man	Uncredited
1964	Get Yourself a College Girl	Gordon	
1966	The Ghost and Mr. Chicken	Mr. Milo Maxwell	
1966	Frankie and Johnny	Proprietor of Costume Shop	Uncredited
1966	A Fine Madness	Rollie Butter	
1967	The Cool Ones	Manager	
1967	The Perils of Pauline	Stafford	Uncredited
1968	Never a Dull Moment	Museum Director	
1971	How to Frame a Figg	Funeral Director	
1972	Night Call Nurses	Dr. Rolland	
1973	The Student Teachers	Principal Peters	
1974	Truck Turner	Judge Advocate	
