= Paul Comi =

American actor (1932–2016)

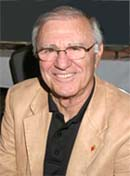
- Comi in 2007
- Born: Paul Domingo Comi; February 11, 1932; Brookline, Massachusetts, U.S.
- Died: August 26, 2016 (aged 84); Pasadena, California, U.S.
- Education: University of Southern California
- Occupation: Actor
- Years active: 1958–1995
- Spouse: Eva Comi
- Children: 3

Paul Domingo Comi (February 11, 1932 – August 26, 2016) was an American film and television actor.

== Biography ==
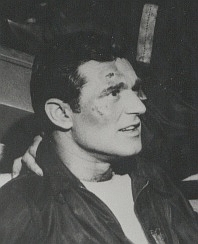
Paul Comi in The Twilight Zone, episode "People Are Alike All Over"

Paul Comi was born 1932 in Brookline, Massachusetts. and grew up in nearby North Quincy, graduating from high school in 1949, after which he joined the United States Army. He was awarded three Purple Hearts during the Korean War, in which he served (1950–51).

Awarded a scholarship to USC School of Dramatic Arts at the University of Southern California, he graduated in 1958 Magna Cum Laude with membership in Tau Kappa Epsilon, Phi Beta Kappa, Phi Kappa Phi and Blue Key honors.

He and his wife Eva had three children. As an apprentice at the La Jolla Playhouse the summer of 1957, 20th Century Fox picked him up and cast him as Pvt. Abbott in The Young Lions with Marlon Brando and Montgomery Clift; he would act for four more decades.

Comi died on August 26, 2016, in Pasadena, California, at the age of 84.

== Acting career ==
Comi's acting career spanned four decades, from the mid-1950s through the mid-1990s. He made over three hundred television appearances, twenty movies, and a number of recurring television roles. These included Deputy Johnny Evans in the syndicated western series Two Faces West (1960–61), starring Charles Bateman, the part of Brad Carter, prosecuting attorney in The Virginian while Lee J. Cobb was in the cast. He was cast along with others, including Bruce Dern and Joby Baker, who were all part of Paul Burke's crew in Burke's initial introduction, on 12 O'Clock High.

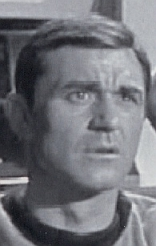
Paul Comi in Star Trek

Comi's professional acting career began in 1957, when, as an apprentice at the La Jolla Playhouse, he was given a small part in the play Career that starred Don Taylor and Una Merkel. His comedy scene as a drunken GI earned rave reviews in The Hollywood Reporter and Variety, leading to his being signed by 20th Century Fox for the role of Pvt. Abbott in The Young Lions with Montgomery Clift and Dean Martin. At Fox, he appeared in several films: In Love and War with Jeffrey Hunter and Robert Wagner; A Private's Affair with Ernie Kovacs; and was lent out to Warner Bros. for the role of "Jenkins" in the Michael Garrison production of The Dark at the Top of the Stairs with Robert Preston and Dorothy McGuire. He also played Lt Tim, Steve McQueen's assistant in The Towering Inferno.

In 1960, Comi appeared in The Twilight Zone episode "People Are Alike All Over", as Warren Marcusson. Between 1961 and 1962, he portrayed airplane pilot Chuck Lambert on the first-run syndicated television adventure series Ripcord about skydiving and was a regular on the Western series Rawhide. He also played Victor Markham for one and one half seasons on the daytime soap Capitol, followed by two seasons as George Durnley in General Hospital. Besides, he had two guest appearances on Voyage to the Bottom of the Sea in the episodes "Submarine Sunk Here" and "Deadly Creature Below!"

Comi played navigator Lt. Andrew Stiles for the Star Trek episode "Balance of Terror" (1966). He played the banker Farnsworth in "The Wild, Wild West" S3 E9 "The Night of the Circus of Death" (1967). He appeared in Barnaby Jones in the episode titled "Dangerous Summer" (02/11/1975).

Comi was a voting member of the Academy of Motion Picture Arts and Sciences.

== Business interests ==
He was President of Caffe D'Amore Inc. a coffee company started by his wife, Eva, the creator of the world's first flavored instant cappuccino, Caffe D'Amore.

== Partial filmography ==
- 1958: The Young Lions - Private Abbott (uncredited)
- 1958: In Love and War – Father Wallensack
- 1959: Warlock – Luke Friendly (uncredited)
- 1959: Pork Chop Hill – Sergeant Kreucheberg
- 1959: Peter Gunn (Season 2 Episode 9: "The Rifle") – William Erlich
- 1959: 77 Sunset Strip (Season 1 Episode 26: "The Grandma Caper") – Fred
- 1960: A Private's Affair – Military Policeman (uncredited)
- 1960: The Rise and Fall of Legs Diamond – Paul (uncredited)
- 1960: Two Faces West – Deputy Johnny Evans
- 1960: Men Into Space (Season 1 Episode 18: "Caves of the Moon") – Major John Arnold
- 1960: The Untouchables (Season 1 Episode 17: "One-Armed Bandits") – George Colleoni
- 1960: Wake Me When It's Over – Lieutenant Malcolm Bressler (uncredited)
- 1960: The Dark at the Top of the Stairs – Jenkins (uncredited)
- 1960: The Twilight Zone (Season 1 Episode 25: "People Are Alike All Over") - Marcusson
- 1961: The Twilight Zone (Season 2 Episode 18: "The Odyssey of Flight 33") - First Officer John Craig
- 1961: The Outsider – Sergeant Boyle
- 1961–1963: Ripcord (17 episodes) – Chuck Lambert
- 1962: Alfred Hitchcock Presents (Season 7 Episode 32: "Victim Four") - Joe Drake
- 1962: Cape Fear – George Garner
- 1962: Stoney Burke (Season 1 Episode 8: "The Scavenger") – Frank Foley
- 1962: 40 Pounds of Trouble – Deputy Sheriff Cavanaugh
- 1963: The Twilight Zone (Season 4 Episode 11: "The Parallel") - Psychiatrist
- 1964: 77 Sunset Strip (Season 6 Episode 17: "Not Such a Simple Knot") - Don Barnes (uncredited)
- 1964: 12 O'Clock High (Season 1 Episode 1: "Golden Boy Had Nine Black Sheep") - Lieutenant Kelly
- 1964: Voyage to the Bottom of the Sea (Season 1 Episode 10: "Submarine Sunk Here") – Lt. Bishop (uncredited)
- 1964-65 Rawhide (6 episodes) - Yo Yo
- 1965: The Alfred Hitchcock Hour (Season 3 Episode 12: "The Crimson Witness") – Detective Modeer
- 1965: 12 O'Clock High (Season 2 Episode 2: "R/X for a Sick Bird") – Major Adams
- 1965: Perry Mason (Season 8 Episode 22: "The Case of the Sad Sicilian") – Father Reggiani
- 1965: The F.B.I. (Season 1 Episode 10: "The Giant Killer") - Major Slidell
- 1966: The F.B.I. (Season 2 Episode 2: "The Escape") - Howard Schaal
- 1966: 12 O'Clock High (Season 2 Episode 16: "Falling Star") - Captain Banazak
- 1966: 12 O'Clock High (Season 3 Episode 2: "Massacre") - Major Simpson
- 1966: Blindfold – Barker
- 1966: The Time Tunnel (Season 1 Episode 8: "Massacre") – Captain Frederick Benteen
- 1966: Star Trek (Season 1 Episode 14: "Balance of Terror") – Stiles
- 1966: The Wild Wild West (Season 1 Episode 23: "The Night of the Two-Legged Buffalo") - Vittorio Pellagrini
- 1966: The Wild Wild West (Season 2 Episode 11: "The Night of the Ready-Made Corpse") - Colonel Pellargo #2
- 1966: Voyage to the Bottom of the Sea (Season 2 Episode 16: "Deadly Creature Below!") – Hawkins
- 1967: The F.B.I. (Season 2 Episode 27: "The Satellite") - SAC Harper
- 1967: The Invaders (Season 1 Episode 12: "Storm") – Danny
- 1967: The Wild Wild West (Season 3 Episode 9: "The Night of the Circus of Death") - Bert Farnsworth
- 1968: The F.B.I. (Season 3 Episode 15: "Act of Violence") - Crime Scene Special Agent
- 1968: The Invaders (Season 2 Episode 24: "The Life Seekers") – Sheriff
- 1968: Mannix (Season 1 Episode 20: "Another Final Exit") - Harry
- 1969: Mannix (Season 3 Episode 4: "The Playground") - Rudy
- 1969: All the Loving Couples – Mike Corey
- 1971: Cannon (Season 1 Episode 10: "No Pockets in the Shroud") - Detective Lou Micelli
- 1972: Conquest of the Planet of the Apes – 2nd Policeman
- 1973: Cannon (Season 3 Episode 14: "A Well Remembered Terror") - Airline Official
- 1973: Room 222 (Season 4 Episode 8: "The Hand That Feeds") – Mr. Winters
- 1974: The Towering Inferno – Tim
- 1977: The Streets of San Francisco (Season 5 Episode 19: "Interlude") – Alexander Dichter
- 1980: The Killings at Outpost Zeta – Commander Craig
- 1981: Longshot – Coleman
- 1981: Dallas (Season 5 Episode 11: "Waterloo at Southfork") – Dr. McWright
- 1982: Death Wish II – Senator McLean
- 1984: Best Defense – Chief Agent
- 1985: Falcon Crest (Season 5 Episode 12: "False Hope") – Money Scammer
- 1985: Knots Landing (Season 6 Episode 20: "The Emperor's Clothes") - Doctor
- 1986: Knots Landing (Season 7 Episode 22: "High School Confidential") - Doctor
- 1986: Howard the Duck – Dr. Chapin
- 1986: Fame (Season 6 Episode 2: "The Last Dance") – The Minister
- 1986: Highway to Heaven (Season 2 Episode 23: "Children's Children") - Harvey
- 1987: Spies ("The Game's Not Over, 'Til the Fat Lady Sings")
- 1987: Highway to Heaven (Season 3 Episode 21: "Parents' Day") - Sergeant Baker
- 1989: Highway to Heaven (Season 5 Episode 10: "Summer Camp") - Phil Lightell
- 1990: Knots Landing (Season 12 Episode 5: "What If?") - Ed Boyce
- 1991: L.A. Law (Season 5 Episode 21: "On the Toad Again") – Detective Douglas French
- 1991: L.A. Law (Season 5 Episode 22: "Since I Fell for You") - Detective Douglas French
- 1995: Baywatch (Season 6 Episode 6: "Leap of Faith") – Mr. Samuels

== Awards and decorations ==
- Purple Heart (A 3 Purple Heart Veteran of the Korean War)
- Phi Beta Kappa USC 1958, Phi Kappa Phi Honor Society USC 1958, Blue Key Honors USC 1958

== See also ==
- List of The Twilight Zone (1959 TV series) guest stars
- List of Fame (1982 TV series) episodes
