= Honey's Money =

- Title card
- Directed by: Friz Freleng
- Story by: John Dunn
- Starring: Mel Blanc; June Foray; Billy Booth
- Edited by: Treg Brown
- Music by: Milt Franklyn
- Animation by: Gerry Chiniquy; Lee Halpern; Art Leonardi; Bob Matz; Virgil Ross; Harry Love
- Layouts by: Hawley Pratt
- Backgrounds by: Tom O'Loughlin
- Color process: Technicolor
- Production company: Warner Bros. Cartoons
- Distributed by: Warner Bros. Pictures
- Release date: September 1, 1962
- Running time: 6:17
- Language: English

Honey's Money is a 1962 Merrie Melodies animated short featuring Yosemite Sam. The short was released on September 1, 1962.

== Plot ==
Yosemite Sam endeavors to exploit a local widow's $5 million inheritance by marrying her, intending to acquire financial control and execute various nefarious schemes. However, upon discovering the widow's unattractive appearance, Sam initially recoils but relents when enticed by the prospect of sharing her wealth. Subsequent to the marriage, Sam attempts to assert himself as a domineering figure, but the widow shows her true colors as she proves to be more dominant and compels Sam into servitude, relegating him to menial household tasks while she assumes a passive role.

The situation escalates with the introduction of the widow's son Wentworth, a physically imposing yet mentally immature boy who wants play with his new stepfather. Sam initially refuses to do anything with Wentworth, but when the widow reminds him of a risk of being denied of his share of his wealth, Sam reluctantly engages in paternal duties, enduring discomfort and humiliation.

Driven by greed, Sam seeks to murder Wentworth to secure sole access to the wealth. Sam's first attempt involves throwing a ball into the street (occupied by driving cars) for Wentworth to catch, but the widow foils this and forces Sam to get the ball himself, resulting Sam to be run over by cars. Sam's second attempt involves putting alligators in the pool where Wentworth is about to swim in, but this backfires as Wentworth's massive jump into the pool caused the alligators to be thrown out and attack Sam, much to his shock.

Sam initially attempts to leave as he doesn't want to endure more of the widow and Wentworth's antics, but decides to stay with them as he feels that enduring their antics would be worth getting the wealth.

== Voice cast ==
- Mel Blanc as Yosemite Sam
- June Foray as the Widow
- Billy Booth as Wentworth

== Production notes ==
Honey's Money serves as a reimagining of two 1950s animated shorts, namely His Bitter Half and Hare Trimmed. In His Bitter Half, Daffy Duck enters a marriage of convenience with a wealthy female duck, only to find himself grappling with unforeseen challenges when his spouse transforms into a demanding figure, imposing household duties and revealing the existence of a previously undisclosed son. This narrative framework is replicated in Honey's Money, with Yosemite Sam assuming the role originally held by Daffy Duck, albeit accompanied by some altered sequences. The character of Wentworth, portrayed as an innocent and physically imposing child of limited intellect in Honey's Money, diverges from the depiction of a mischievous youngster in the original short. While elements from Hare Trimmed are incorporated into Honey's Money, such as certain comedic motifs, the involvement of Bugs Bunny, a prominent character in the former, is omitted from the latter adaptation.

Honey's Money marks a notable departure from the traditional pairing of Yosemite Sam with perennial adversary Bugs Bunny, a dynamic observed in most of the original theatrical cartoons, save for Along Came Daffy (1947). This short stands as Yosemite Sam's only story as a sole protagonist in the original Merrie Melodies-Looney Tunes catalog.

The thematic premise of Honey's Money would resurface in 1970 within the Roland and Rattfink series, titled "A Taste of Money".

Composer Milt Franklyn contributed the musical score for Honey's Money, but died in April 1962, before the short was released. The introduction of replacement composer William Lava's credit in the opening sequence began in November, coinciding with the release of the short Good Noose.

== Reception ==
Animation historian David Gerstein writes, "Desperate to make married life endurable under the circumstances, Yosemite is driven to some of the darkest plots ever seen in a Looney Tune — efforts to murder his young stepson via alligators and speeding cars. Only Sam's sheer bombast and exaggerated evil make the material funny rather than tragic. Freleng takes an admirably successful risk. Sam's own risks aren't as successful... for him."

== Music ==
- "The Gold Diggers' Song (We're in the Money)", c. 1933, lyrics Al Dubin, music by Harry Warren
- "Ain't We Got Fun", 1921, Richard A. Whiting

== Home media ==
This cartoon was released on Blu-ray and DVD on the 2014 Looney Tunes Platinum Collection: Volume 3.

== See also ==
- List of Yosemite Sam cartoons
