= Twenty Two (The Twilight Zone) =

- The Twilight Zone episode
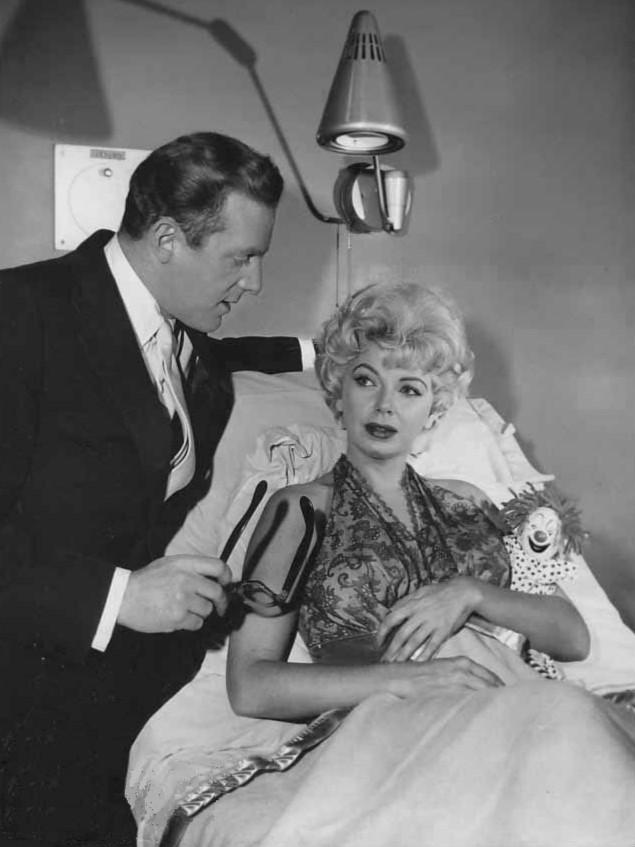
- Barbara Nichols and Fredd Wayne
- Episode no.: Season 2 Episode 17
- Directed by: Jack Smight
- Teleplay by: Rod Serling
- Based on: an anecdote from Famous Ghost Stories by Bennett Cerf
- Production code: 173-3666
- Original air date: February 10, 1961

Guest appearances
- Barbara Nichols as Liz Powell; Jonathan Harris as The Doctor; Fredd Wayne as Barney Kamener; Arline Sax as Nurse in Morgue / Stewardess; Mary Adams as Day Nurse; Norma Connolly as Night Nurse; Wesley Lau as Airline Agent; Angus Duncan as Ticket Clerk

Episode chronology
← Previous "A Penny for Your Thoughts"	Next → "The Odyssey of Flight 33"
- The Twilight Zone (1959 TV series) (season 2)

"Twenty Two" is episode 53 of the American television series The Twilight Zone. The story was adapted by Rod Serling from a short anecdote in the 1944 Bennett Cerf Random House anthology Famous Ghost Stories, which itself was an adaptation of "The Bus-Conductor", a short story by E. F. Benson published in The Pall Mall Magazine in 1906, which was also adapted in the 1945 horror anthology Dead Of Night. It was one of the six episodes of the second season that were shot on videotape in a short-lived experiment aimed at cutting costs, and was directed by Jack Smight.

== Opening narration ==
This is Miss Liz Powell. She's a professional dancer and she's in the hospital as a result of overwork and nervous fatigue. And at this moment we have just finished walking with her in a nightmare. In a moment she'll wake up and we'll remain at her side. The problem here is that both Miss Powell and you will reach a point where it might be difficult to decide which is reality and which is nightmare, a problem uncommon perhaps but rather peculiar to the Twilight Zone.

== Plot ==
Liz Powell awakens in her hospital room by the loud ticking of a clock. She knocks a glass of water to the floor, shattering it, then follows the sound of footsteps into the hall. She sees a nurse, half-hidden in shadow, descend to the basement in the elevator. She follows the nurse down and finds the hospital morgue, room 22. The nurse emerges from the room and says, "Room for one more, honey." Liz screams and flees to the elevator.

Liz awakens, the experience being a nightmare. Liz is a professional dancer working in a nightclub, hospitalized for exhaustion, and she has been having the same recurring, vivid nightmare. She insists the dream is really happening to her, although her agent, Barney, seems doubtful. Her doctor tries to assure her this is impossible. He produces the night nurse who attends the morgue, and Liz does not recognize her. The doctor suggests Liz try an experiment in lucid dreaming and alter one detail of the dream.

That night, the dream begins again. Liz visualizes a pack of cigarettes next to the glass on the nightstand. When the clock awakens her, she reaches for a cigarette instead of the glass. She drops the lighter, and while reaching to retrieve it, her other hand knocks the glass to the floor. The dream continues as before, ending in the morgue. Liz awakens hysterical, and a nurse is required to hold her down while the doctor sedates her. The doctor tells the nurse it is odd that Liz, who has never seen the real morgue, knows it is room number 22.

After several days, Liz is discharged from the hospital. She goes to the airport to fly to her next booking in Miami Beach. She buys her ticket and is told she will be on Flight 22. She begins experiencing sensory details from the dream: she is thirsty, distracted by the ticking of a clock that only she can hear, bumps into a woman carrying a vase which drops and shatters, and hears loud footsteps. She crosses the tarmac to her plane and climbs the boarding stairs. As she reaches the top, a stewardess identical to the nurse from the dream emerges from the cabin and says, "Room for one more, honey." Screaming, Liz stumbles down the stairs and races back to the terminal. Outside the terminal, Flight 22 taxis to the runway, takes off—and explodes.

== Closing narration ==
Miss Elizabeth Powell, professional dancer. Hospital diagnosis: acute anxiety brought on by overwork and fatigue. Prognosis: with rest and care, she'll probably recover. But the cure to some nightmares is not to be found in known medical journals. You look for it under 'potions for bad dreams'—to be found in the Twilight Zone.

Immediately after this, there is an announcement saying "And now, Mr. Serling", followed by Serling describing next week's episode from what appears to be part of the set for that episode.

Next week you'll find each of your names on the passenger manifest of this jet aircraft that travels from London to New York City. You'll sit in these seats and you'll go through an experience unique beyond words, and tense beyond anything I believe you've ever seen. You'll be departing next week at about this time, in a vehicle we call The Odyssey of Flight 33. But be prepared for a stop midway, in the Twilight Zone.

== Production ==
The original 1906 story by E.F. Benson features a large, middle-aged male protagonist named Hugh Grainger from the English country visiting a friend in London. He is haunted by a man dressed like a bus conductor—but driving a horse-drawn hearse. He sees the same man a month later actually driving a bus that is involved in a tremendous auto accident. The 1944 Cerf anecdote features instead a young New York woman visiting the Carolina plantation of distant relatives, with the hearse's coachman eventually revealed to be the operator of a medical building elevator that plummets when its cables break. In the 1944 film, Dead of Night, the protagonist is again male, also with the name Hugh Grainger, haunted by a man driving a hearse, and has a premonition about a fatal bus crash.

As The Twilight Zone's second season began, the production was informed by CBS that, at about $65,000 per episode, the show was exceeding its budget. By November 1960, 16 episodes, more than half of the projected 29, were already filmed, and five of those had been broadcast. It was decided that six consecutive episodes (production code #173-3662 through #173-3667) would be videotaped at CBS Television City in the manner of a live drama and eventually transferred to 16-millimeter film for future syndicated rebroadcasts. Eventual savings amounted to only about $30,000 for all six entries, which was judged to be insufficient to offset the loss of depth of visual perspective that, at the time, only film could offer. Due to the appearance of the final product, which was compared to set-bound soap operas, the experiment was deemed a failure and never tried again.

== Sources ==
- DeVoe, Bill. (2008). Trivia from The Twilight Zone. Albany, GA: Bear Manor Media. ISBN 978-1-59393-136-0
- Grams, Martin. (2008). The Twilight Zone: Unlocking the Door to a Television Classic. Churchville, MD: OTR Publishing. ISBN 978-0-9703310-9-0
