= G.I. Carmen =

All-GI 1945 musical stage show

G. I. Carmen was an all-GI 1945 musical stage show produced by the 253rd Infantry Regiment, 63rd Division of the U.S. Army as morale booster for allied troops occupying post-WWII Europe. Initially intended as a three-show run for the regiment, it was extended to reach the entire division and then picked up by the 7th Army and sent on an eight-month tour of the ETO seen by over 250,000 military personnel and countless civilians.

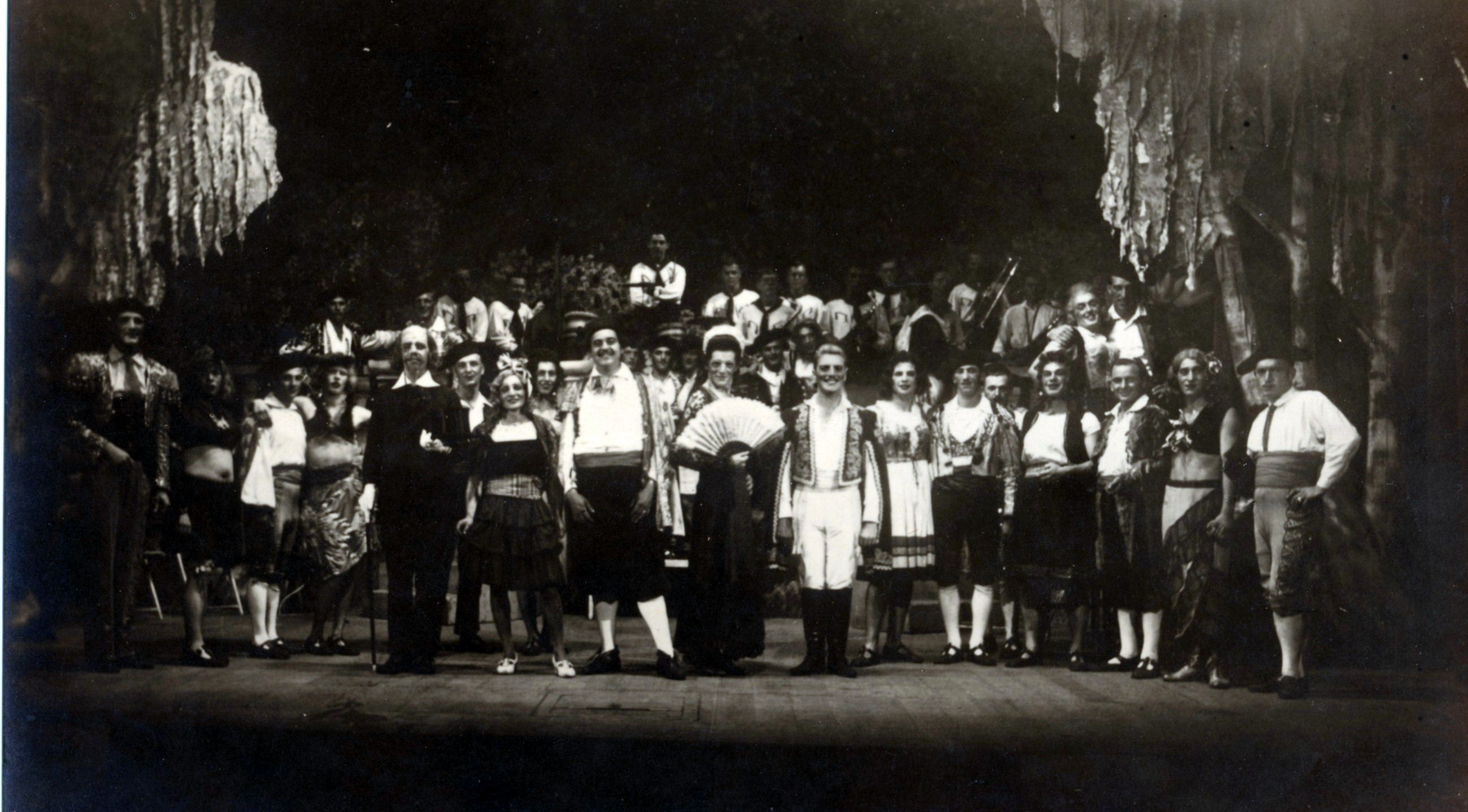
The cast and band of G.I. Carmen on stage at the Theatre Marigny, Paris, France, November 1945

== Background ==
Shortly after V-E Day Lt. Robert T. Bogan, 253rd Special Services officer, directed his assistant, T/5 Frederick Wiener (aka Fredd Wayne), to organize an entertainment for the regiment. Sgt. Joe Pollock, co-collaborator with Wayne on Special Services theatricals during the 253rd’s training stint in Mississippi, joined Wayne in planning a show based on Wayne’s idea of a burlesqued version of Bizet's opera Carmen. Flyers were posted seeking volunteers for cast and crew in "Carmen – a Boilesk Voishin”. Of the 45 GIs in the cast about half would perform in drag but none wanted the title role, so Wayne became the U.S. Army’s Carmen in addition to co-producing and directing the show.

During the nine days allotted for rehearsal cast and crew mustered what costumes, wigs and make-up they could. Guitarist and musical arranger Sgt. Marty Faloon coordinated with choreographer T/Sgt Hal Edwards, who had worked for Arthur Murray and danced in 20th Century Fox Studios musicals, on adaptations of popular contemporary numbers as well as original tunes composed by saxophonist Cpl. Herbert Behrens. The band for G.I. Carmen had its beginnings during stateside training when jazz violinist, Ralph Cerasuolo, once known in New York City as "Leonardo of the Stork Club", coaxed and inspired G.I. volunteers of the 63rd into a swing unit that was in high demand, opening the new USO Club in New Orleans and playing multiple shows weekly around the south during breaks from combat drills. Cerasoulo was killed in action in April 1945; for G.I.Carmen, the band’s leadership fell to Sgt. Faloon. Guitarist S/Sgt Charlie Byrd performed in the chorus as well as the band where his playing was favorably reviewed.

== Performances ==
On June 9, 1945, in the town of Tauberbischofsheim, Germany, the troupe presented the first performance of GI Carmen. The show’s immediate success with military personnel – eager to return home but held in Europe in order to help stabilize the war-torn continent – prompted the 7th Army Special Services to commandeer the production. The first three shows for the regiment had been extended to entertain the entire 63rd Division.

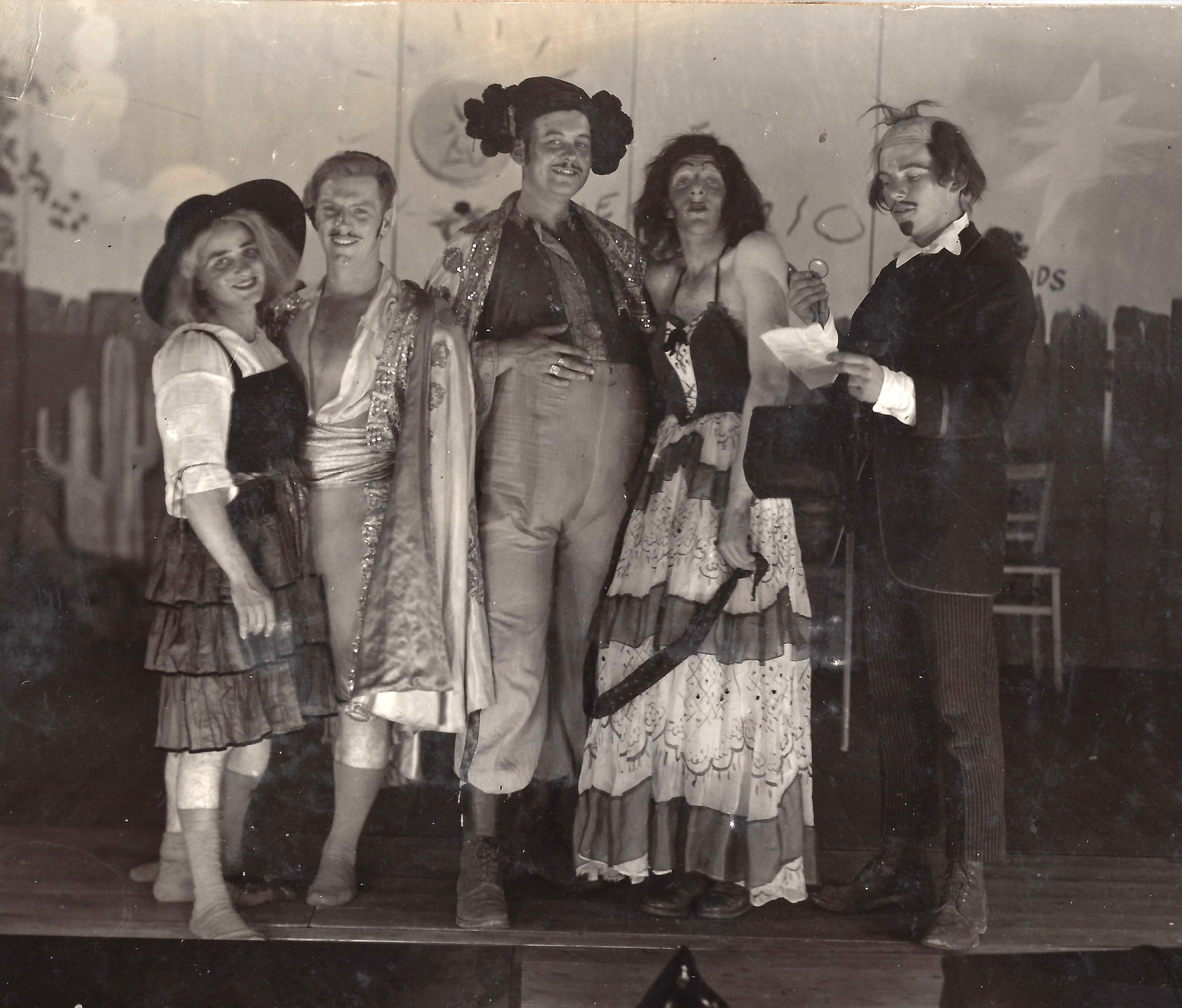
G.I. Carmen principal performers in original costumes. Pvt Al LaVecchia, Cpl Ray Richardson, Cpl Bill "Tex" Thomas, T/5 Fredd Wayne and Sgt Joe Pollock

The performance in Lauda on Monday, June 18, was seen by Lt. Mortimer Yolken of CONAD (Continental Advance Section) Special Service who had the show released from the division to the 7th Army. (It was eventually taken over by TSFET, Theater Service Forces, European Theater.) The show re-opened on June 23, 1945, at Heidelberg’s Stadt Theatre where it had acquired professional costumes, wigs and scenery. G.I. Carmen then began an extended tour of the ETO. Throughout its run G.I. Carmen played to packed venues and was repeatedly held over to accommodate demand. The Heidelberg run was extended one week through July 7; then Mannheim held the show an extra week before releasing it to Wiesbaden on July 18 for a two-week run. The troupe then got three days off before opening in Kassel where, after their 50th show, they were held over through their 56th performance. Then followed a full week of rest. It was late August 1945 and the war in the Pacific was ending.

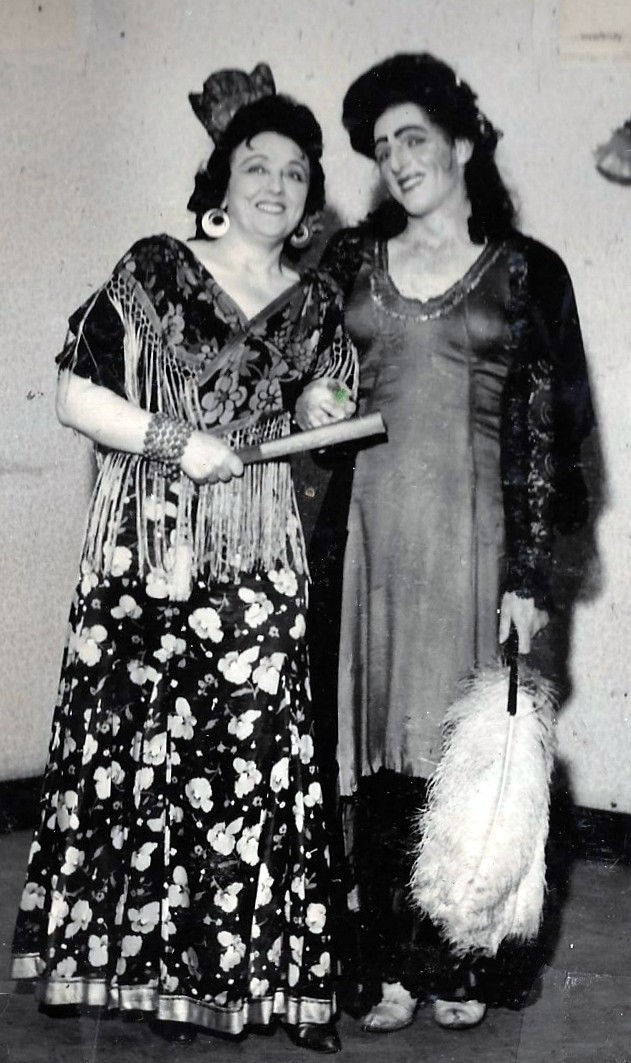
Mezzo-soprano Rosa Christians of the Antwerp opera company and Cpl. Fredd Wayne of the U.S. Army

In September G.I. Carmen played in Geissen and Erbach before opening in Berlin on the 17th and setting attendance records in Titania Palace, Europe’s largest playhouse, extending there through the 30th. Marlene Dietrich, also performing in Berlin, visited during one intermission, walking onstage in an evening gown and playing her musical saw. October brought shows to Bremen, Bremerhaven and in Belgium to Brussels and Antwerp. While in Antwerp cast members posed in costume with their counterparts from the local opera company which was presenting Bizet's version. In November audiences in Paris included Gertrude Stein and Alice B. Toklas who later invited some of the cast to their apartment for refreshments and conversation. The 100th performance closed the Paris run, then on to Calas and Marseilles.

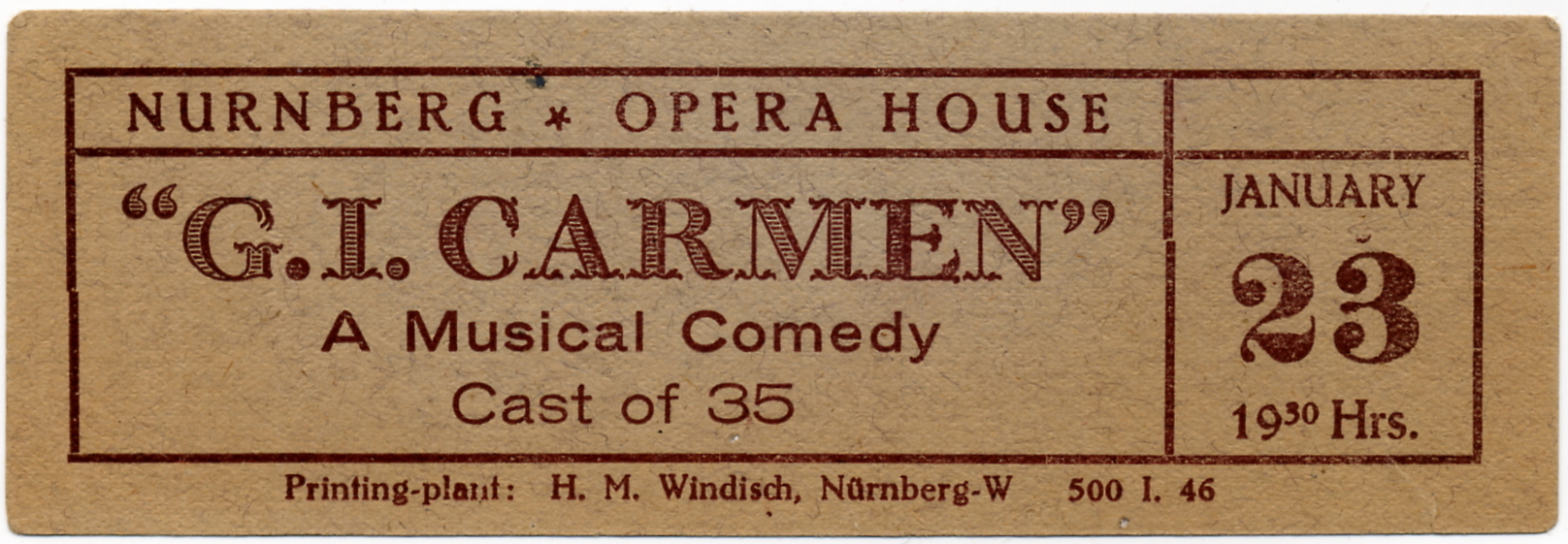

A break on the Riviera before Italy and December runs in Livorno, Rome, Tarvisio and Gorizia. In January to Vienna and finally returning to Germany and closing with the 142nd performance on January 24, 1946 in Nurnberg.

== The men of G.I. Carmen ==
The cover of the first program read: "Carmen (A Boilesk Voishin) presented by special Services 253d Infantry"; and, on page 2: "The Slopopolitan Opera Association (alias Special Services 253d Inf.) presents a F___________ up version of Bizet's opera Carmen in 3 acts." Programs for G.I. Carmen changed through its run as it was taken over by the 7th Army and TSFET Special Service, entr'actes and musical numbers were added, and high point men were sent home.

Principal players

Role	Performer	comments
Carmen, A Gypsy Girl	Cpl Fredd Wiener (later Wayne)	writer / director
Tom Wand (a jockey)	Cpl Ray Richardson	Bizet's Don José, Corporal of Dragoons
El Stinko (a bull slinger)	Cpl Bill "Tex" Thomas	Bizet's Escamillo, Toreador (later performed by Pfc Joe Jackmowski)
Sweet Sue	Pfc Al LaVecchia	Bizet's Micaëla, A Village Maiden
Doktor Quilton Foss	Sgt Joe Pollock	a burlesque of Milton J. Cross, NBC's music commentator (later performed by Sgt Nick Bonardi) Pollock was co-writer / director with Wayne and G.I. Carmen's road manager.

Chorus

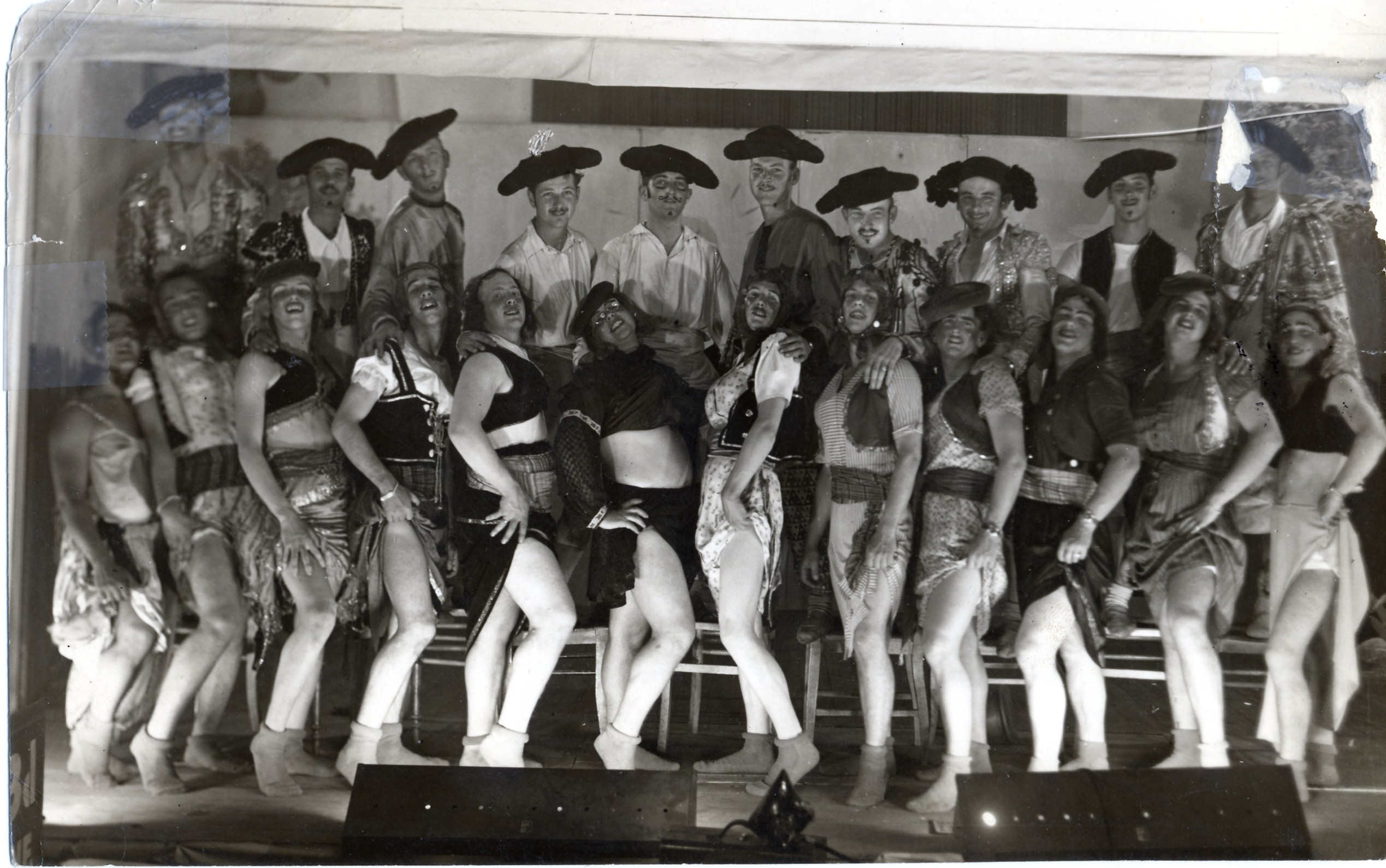
Chorus of G.I. Carmen in original costumes. Fourth from the right in the back row is S/Sgt Charlie Byrd.

"Der Damen"	"Der Herren"
Pfc Jean Denault	T/Sgt Hal Edwards
Sgt Tony Gerbino	Sgt Harry Butensky
Pfc Ken Peterson	Sgt Nick Bonardi
Cpl Richard Bame	Cpl Danny Canestraro
Sgt Carmen Tato	Cpl Arch McAnally
Cpl John Janulis	Pfc Armand Beaulieu
Pvt John Forlano	Pfc Arthur Farmer
Pfc Attilio Savelli	Sgt Paul Jones
S/Sgt Evan Griffiths	S/Sgt Chas Byrd
Cpl Chas Hodges	Cpl Mel Ferguson
Pfc Frank LaManna	Pfc Anselmo Chico
Pfc George Goldberg	

Specialities (entre'actes)

Act	Performer(s)
"A Gypsy and His Guitar"	S/Sgt Charlie Byrd
"Strictly Jumpin'"	Pfc Anselmo Chico
"A Class with Cockeldoo'"	Sgt's Bonardi, Tato, Butensky, Cpl's Hodges and McNally
"History of the Opera"	Sgt Pollock (later Sgt Bonardi)
"The Vagabonds"	T/Sgt Edwards, S/Sgt Byrd, Sgt Berbino and Pfc Beaulieu
"Wrestling!"	Pfc Atillio Savelli and Pvt John Forlano
"Rumba Roger"	T/Sgt Hal Edwards and Sgt Anthony Gerbino
"A Wandering Stooge"	Pvt Joe Jackmowski and Pfc Harris SanFilippo
"Rum and Coca Cola"	S/Sgt Byrd, Pfc Beaulieu and Sgt Gerbino
"A Big, Bad Bass Man"	S/Sgt Marty Schopp
"Boy Meets Horn"	Cpl Charles C. Rudibaugh
"2 Gals and a Guy"	Sgt Butensky, Cpl Hodges and Pfc Goldberg
"Bouncing Button"	Cpl Richard Bame

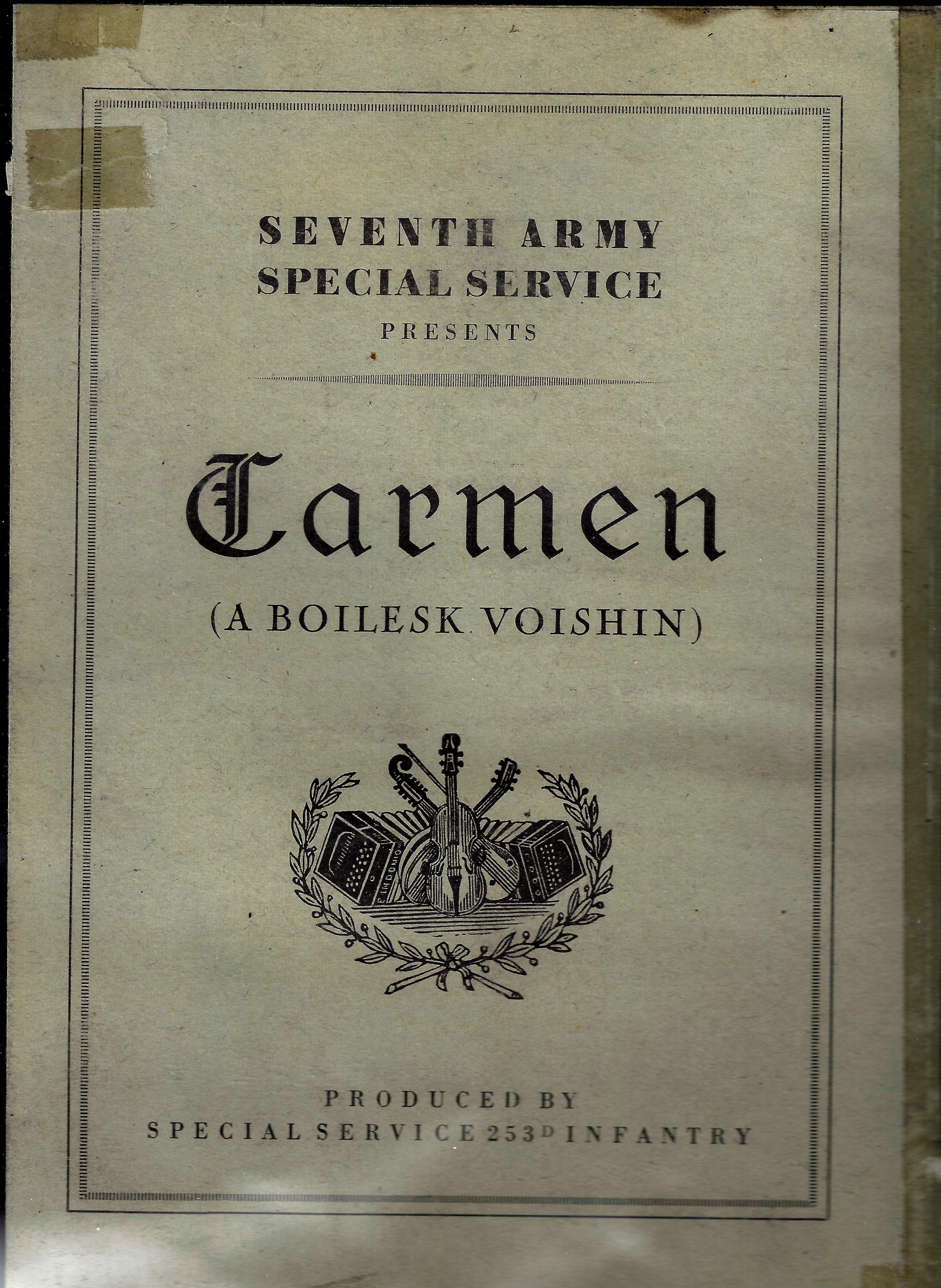
Cover of program for G.I. Carmen produced and performed by the U.S. Army June 1945 – January 1946

The Band

Instrument	Musician
Guitar	Sgt Marty Faloon, Band Leader
Saxes	Cpl Herbert Behrens
Saxes	Cpl John Lippart
Saxes	Pfc Frank Durkey
Trumpets	Cpl Chuck Rudibaugh
Trumpets	Cpl Don Erney
Trumpets	Pfc Frank Nichols
Trombone	Cpl Jim Thomson
Trombone	Pfc Rusty Walker
Rhythm	S/Sgt Marty Schopp . . bass
Rhythm	Pfc Mel Kime . . . . . . . drums
Rhythm	Cpl Robert Burr . . . . . piano
Rhythm	S/Sgt Charlie Byrd . . . guitar

Production Staff

Choral Arranger . . . . . . Sgt Marty Faloon
Choreographer . . . . . . . T/Sgt Hal Edwards
Dance Director . . . . . . . Sgt Anthony Gerbino
Stage and Scenery . . . . Pfc Kermit Tempelton and Cpl Earl Burns
Lighting . . . . . . . . . . . . . Sgt Gordon Myers and Cpl William Lamphere
Special Effects . . . . . . . Cpl Howard Connolly
Costumes, Make Up . . . Pfc Harris Sanfilippo
Company Manager . . . . Sgt Joe Pollock

Throughout the run of G.I. Carmen notices, articles and reviews in Army and civilian publications cited the bawdy, raucous, G.I.-friendly humor, the impressive vocals of Cpl. Ray Richardson and the lively contemporary musical numbers of the production.

== Synopsis ==
Place: A courtyard of a local gasthaus

Act 1

Before the curtain opens opera commentator "Dr. Quilton Foss" introduces the audience to the high art they are soon to witness and sums it up in two words, "It stinks!". Act 1 opens on the "Damen" and "Herren" of the Slopopolitan Opera Chorus swinging to a number by the onstage band. Our hero, Tom Wand enters looking for his girl, "Sweet Sue". Sue enters and Tom sings "I Love You" (by Cole Porter, 1944), "But you didn't shave today, did you?". Soon Carmen enters and steals Tom's affections. Sue is heartbroken and the chorus sings "Her Tears Flowed Like Wine" (by Joe Green and Stan Kenton, 1944) ending Act 1.

Act 2

Another chorus number opens Act 2. Carmen and Tom enter. "Boy! Can she play ping-pong!" But Carmen is lured to another conquest: the toreador, "El Stinko". After performing a pas de deux to "Accentuate le Positif" (by Harold Arlen and Johnny Mercer, 1944) Stinko carries Carmen offstage. A jilted Tom sings "Farewell, Farewell To Love" (by George Siravo and Jack Wolf, as recorded on Swing and Dance with Frank Sinatra, released in 1944) to end Act 2.

Act 3

Sue attempts to win back Tom and sings, "Why Are You So Mean to Me?" (by Pvt Cecil Gant, 1944). The Chorus enters singing of the victorious toreador and El Stinko enters triumphantly with Carmen. The chorus carries El Stinko off to celebrate leaving Carmen alone with Tom. Carmen refuses Tom's advances. Tom, desperate, says if he can't have her no one can. Carmen laughs at his folly and turns to exit. Tom pulls her back and stabs her with "large, dull knife". Kneeling beside her Tom sings, "Sweet Dreams, Sweetheart" (by Maurice K. Jerome and Ted Koehler, 1944). The show ends with the cast performing their own rendition of "Me and My Gal" with lyrics recounting the 63rd Division's war record and anticipating "a push into China and then to Japan".

Playing to the G.I. crowd secondary plotlines follow soldier shenanigans including a successful scheme to trade off a pack of Luckies for twelve additional demobilization points. One reviewer noted a running theme adding "a sprinkling of anti-VD crusading to the performance".

Additional musical numbers in the frequently revised G.I. Carmen included: “I Don’t Want to Love You” (by Phil Brito, 1944) sung by Cpl Richardson; “I’m Confessin’” (by Chris Smith and Al Neiburg, 1930) sung by Cpl Richardson; "Rum and Coca-Cola" (by Lionel Belasco and Rupert Grant, as recorded by the Andrews Sisters in 1945) performed by T/Sgt Edwards, S/Sgt Byrd, Pfc Beaulieu and Sgt Gerbino; “A Little on the Lonely Side” (by Frankie Carle and Paul Allen, 1945) sung by Cpl Robinson; “Sweet Georgia Brown” performed by the band; and “Carmen”, an original ballad written by Cpl Behrens and sung by Cpl Robinson.

== Denouement ==
The cast of G.I. Carmen continued its tour of Europe for five months beyond the official end of World War II, entertaining the remaining allied troops as well as local citizens in theaters and hospitals across the ETO.

The show was revived for a reunion of the 63rd Division held at the Statler Hilton Hotel in New York City in July 1965. For the re-mount the characters of Tom Wand and El Stinko became American astronaut "Tom Missel" and Russian cosmonaut "El Stinko". Participating veterans included Fredd Wayne, Joseph Pollock, George Goldberg, Gordon Meyers, Nick Bonardi, Danny Canestraro, Harry Butensky, Herb Behrens and Al LaVecchia.
