= His Bitter Half =

- Directed by: I. Freleng
- Story by: Tedd Pierce
- Starring: Mel Blanc; Martha Wentworth (uncredited)
- Music by: Carl Stalling
- Animation by: Ken Champin; Virgil Ross; Arthur Davis; Gerry Chiniquy
- Layouts by: Hawley Pratt
- Backgrounds by: Paul Julian
- Color process: Technicolor
- Production company: Warner Bros. Cartoons
- Distributed by: Warner Bros. Pictures; The Vitaphone Corporation
- Release date: May 20, 1950
- Running time: 6 mins
- Language: English

His Bitter Half is a 1950 Warner Bros. Merrie Melodies short, directed by Friz Freleng with a story by Tedd Pierce. The cartoon was released on May 20, 1950, and stars Daffy Duck. The voices are performed by Mel Blanc and Martha Wentworth.

Both His Bitter Half and Freleng's 1962 Yosemite Sam short Honey's Money have a similar plot: a fortune-seeking bachelor marrying an ugly mean widow, whose true personality is revealed only after the wedding, and, after forced to do backbreaking housechores, being made to care for her child, introduced (to both the main protagonist and the audience) only after the marriage is legalized. The child in both shorts is named Wentworth; here, Wentworth is a normal sized brat who causes trouble, with Daffy suffering the consequences of his son's actions. (In Honey's Money, Wentworth is a giant 3-year-old whose heavy weight is a problem for Sam, but his attitude is friendly to Sam, who tries to bump him off to keep the money for himself.) The differing personalities of the two Wentworths results in different executions for each cartoon.

His Bitter Half was reused as a clip in a 1980 TV special where Daffy tells his life's struggles in an attempt to produce a movie about Duck Dodgers. The latter part of the title is a pun on the phrase "better half", meaning someone's romantic partner.

== Plot ==
Daffy learns that a refined lady duck with a high income is seeking someone to marry. After the requisite courtship and marriage, Daffy looks forward to a life of luxury. However, the lady duck, whose personality is as domineering as her size, immediately orders Daffy to do the housework. After an afternoon of exhausting tasks, he is startled by the appearance of the lady duck's rambunctious son Wentworth, whom Daffy wants nothing to do with.

After being scalped playing cowboys and Indians, Daffy is made to take Wentworth to the amusement park after being shown the bank book. At the amusement park, Daffy tries his luck at a shooting gallery, but each time he takes a shot, Wentworth uses a slingshot to bean the back of the barker's head, who angrily socks Daffy without even bothering to look from behind. His disgusted wife assumes that Daffy is "fried to the gills" and orders him to go to bed, since he has got to help Wentworth shoot off fireworks on the Fourth of July. The holiday begins with Daffy taking the brunt of a fireworks mishap, followed by Wentworth disguising himself as a lit firecracker. Daffy, wanting to teach the brat a lesson, thinks he has found him and begins to discipline him, only to see the disguised Wentworth racing by, just seconds before the firecracker explodes.

The lady duck then demands that Daffy take Wentworth to the zoo. Despite a threat from his wife to pluck every feather from Daffy's body if he refuses, Daffy stands his ground and instead walks out through the door with packed suitcases in hand, retorting that no one is gonna tell him what to do. However, his body (below the shoulders) has been stripped clean of feathers, just as the lady duck had promised. Nevertheless, he leaves and does not look back.

== Home media ==
This short is available on the Looney Tunes Collector's Choice: Volume 1 Blu-ray.
