= Billy Booth (actor) =

American actor (1949–2006)

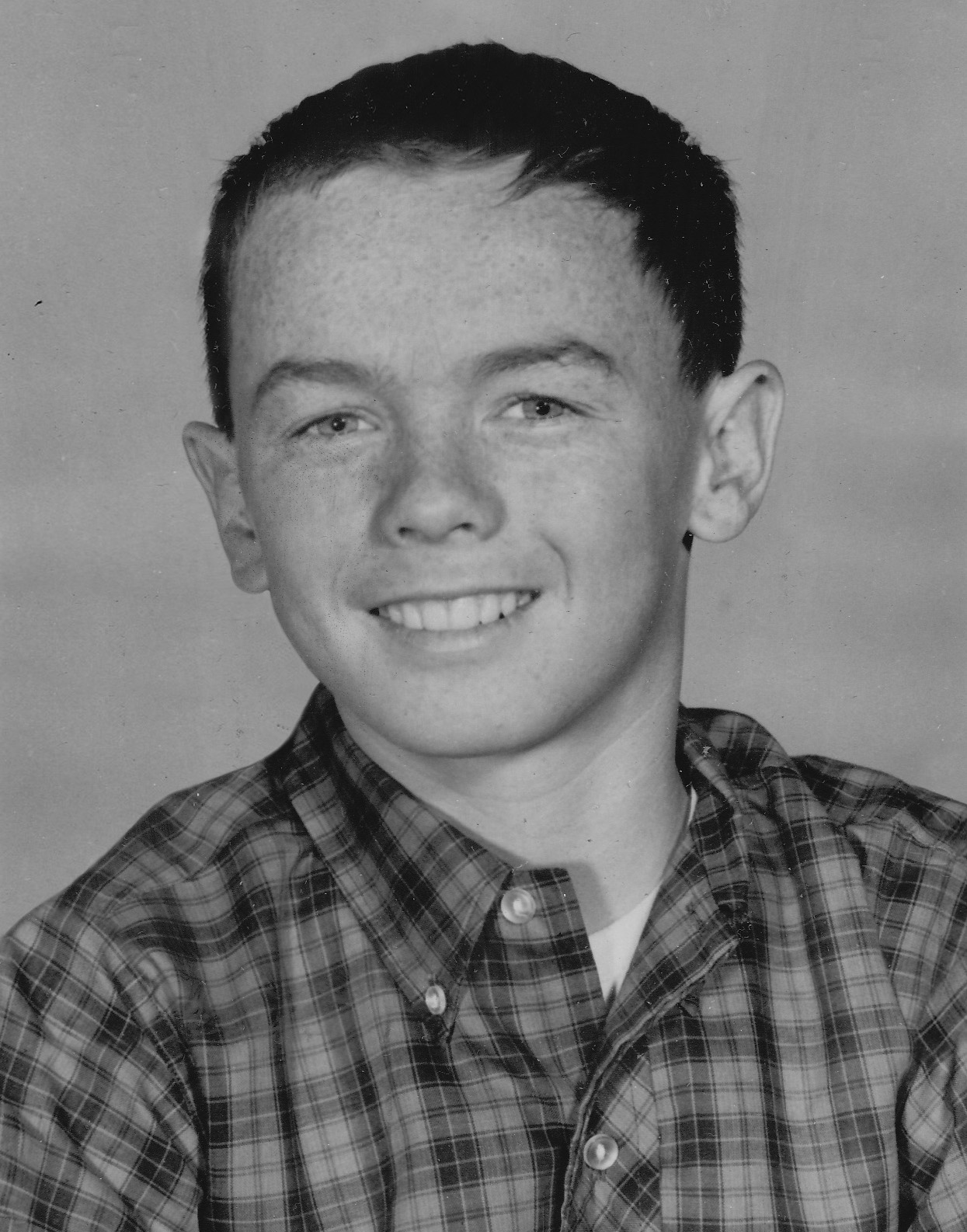
- Booth in 1964
- Born: William Allen Booth; November 7, 1949; Los Angeles, California, U.S.
- Died: December 31, 2006 (aged 57); San Luis Obispo, California, U.S.
- Occupation: Actor
- Years active: 1957–1967

William Allen Booth (November 7, 1949 – December 31, 2006) was an American child actor. He was best known for his role as Dennis Mitchell's best friend Tommy Anderson on the CBS sitcom Dennis the Menace, based on the Hank Ketcham comic strip of the same name. He made guest appearances on The Twilight Zone, My Three Sons, The Donna Reed Show, Lawman, The Many Loves of Dobie Gillis, and The Andy Griffith Show. He also provided the voice for Wentworth in the 1962 Merrie Melodies episode Honey's Money.

== Biography ==
Booth graduated from Crescenta Valley High School in 1967, from the University of Southern California in 1971, and from the University of California, Hastings College of the Law in 1974. He became a practicing lawyer and moved to Los Osos, California in 1977. He taught business and real estate law at both Cuesta College and Cal Poly San Luis Obispo, both located in San Luis Obispo County, California. He divorced his wife Kathern. He practiced law in Morro Bay, California.

== Death ==
Booth died on December 31, 2006 of liver complications at the age of 57.

== Filmography ==
=== Film ===
Year	Title	Role	Notes
1957	The Snow Queen	Himself - English Prologue	Film debut
1960	Hell Bent for Leather	Child	Uncredited
1960	The Facts of Life	Little Gray Squirrel	Uncredited
1962	Honey's Money	Wentworth (voice)	Short film
1966	Follow Me, Boys!	Leo	Final film

=== Television ===
Year	Title	Role	Notes
1959	Goodyear Theatre	George	Episode: A Light in the Fruit Closet
1959-1963	Dennis the Menace	Tommy Anderson	Recurring Cast Member: 111 episodes
1960	Law of the Plainsman	Quinn Wesley	Episode: The Rawhiders
1960	The Twilight Zone	Short Boy	Episode: A Stop at Willoughby
1960	The Slowest Gun in the West	The Son	TV movie
1960	The Many Loves of Dobie Gillis	Boy	Episode: A Taste for Lobster
1960-1961	Assignment: Underwater	Joey	2 episodes
1961	Lawman	Tad McCallan	Episode: The Prodigal Mother
1962	The Detectives	Justin	Episode: Pandora's Box
1963-1967	My Three Sons	Richard/Charley/Jack	3 episodes
1964	The Donna Reed Show	Petey	Episode: Teamwork
1964	Grindl	Billy	Episode: Aunt Grindl
1964	The Andy Griffith Show	Roger	Episode: The Family Visit
1964	The Farmer's Daughter	Andy	Episode: Speak for Yourself John Katy
