= Grindl =

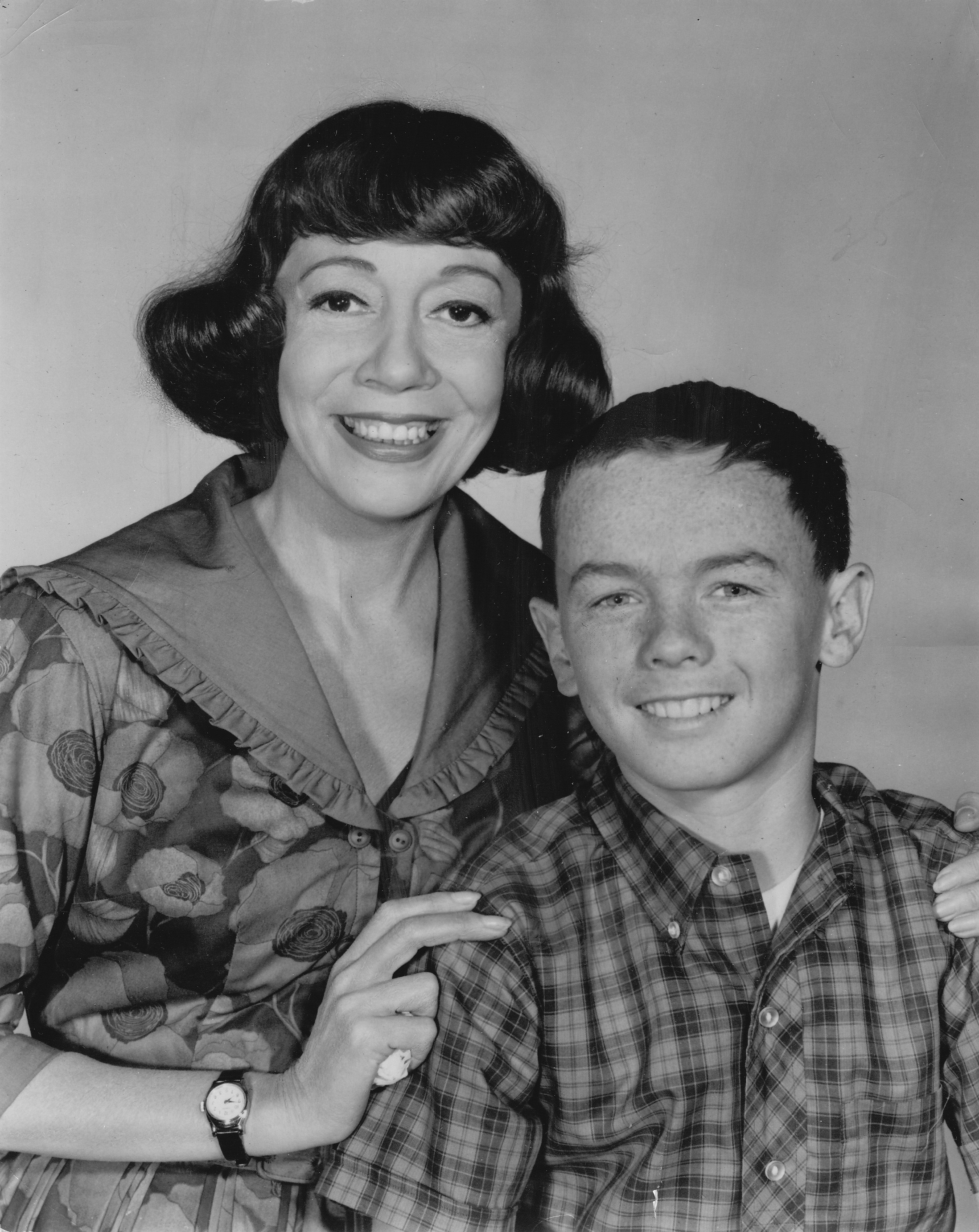
- Publicity photo of Imogene Coca and Billy Booth in the final episode, "Aunt Grindl" (1964)
- Genre: Sitcom
- Created by: David Swift
- Written by: William Davenport; Budd Grossman; Ed Jurist; Lee Loeb; John McGreevey; Bob Nye; Gerald O'Hanlon; Jay Sommers; Ray Singer; Burt Styler; David Swift
- Directed by: Charles Barton
- Starring: Imogene Coca; James Millhollin
- Theme music composer: Frank De Vol
- Country of origin: United States
- Original language: English
- No. of seasons: 1
- No. of episodes: 32

Production
- Executive producer: David Swift
- Producers: Harry Ackerman; Winston O´Keefe
- Camera setup: Multi-camera
- Running time: 22–24 minutes
- Production companies: David Swift Productions; Screen Gems

Original release
- Network: NBC
- Release: September 15, 1963 – May 3, 1964

Grindl is an American situation comedy that began in fall 1963 on NBC, originally sponsored by Procter & Gamble. The show, starring Imogene Coca in the title role, lasted for one season.

== Synopsis ==
Grindl (Coca) worked for Foster's Temporary Employment service and was employed doing domestic work. The show revolved around the different humorous situations she would get into with each new job she was assigned to each week.

The first show featured guest star Telly Savalas, who would later star as Kojak. Other guest stars included George Kennedy, Paul Lynde, Robert Q. Lewis, Jack Albertson, Robert Karnes, Darryl Richard, and Leif Erickson.

Grindl was scheduled on Sunday nights at 8:30 p.m. in September 1963, sandwiched between Walt Disney's Wonderful World of Color and Bonanza, both major hits. Although the series was pitted against the second half of The Ed Sullivan Show on CBS, it performed well in the ratings and a second season was planned. However, NBC abruptly canceled the series when Screen Gems and sponsor Procter & Gamble requested a budget increase that the network would not accept.

== Cast ==
- Imogene Coca – Grindl
- James Millhollin – Anson Foster, Grindl's boss

== Episodes ==
No.	Title	Directed by	Written by	Original release date
1	"The Gruesome Basement"	David Swift	David Swift	September 15, 1963
Grindl confuses the police in attempting to explain the disappearance of her employer's wife.
2	"Grindl, Counterspy"	William D. Russell	Charles Tannen & Lou Huston	September 22, 1963
Foreign spies covet a secret rocket formula which is stored in the house where Grindl works.
3	"Grindl, She-Wolf of Wall Street"	Sherman Marks	Joe Bigelow	September 29, 1963
Grindl startles Wall Street with her unconventional approach to high finance by the use of numerology.
4	"The Ghastly Honeymoon"	William D. Russell	John McGreevey	October 6, 1963
The owners of a Lonely Hearts Club introduces Grindl to Antoine D'Beauville, a Frenchman who begins a whirlwind courtship.
5	"Grindl and the Counterfeiters"	William D. Russell	Ray Singer & Dick Chevillat	October 13, 1963
Grindl innocently passes bogus money, then learns that the crooks plan to kill her so that the phony currency can't be traced.
6	"Grindl: Femme Fatale"	Stanley Prager	Jerry Davis & Lee Loeb	October 20, 1963
Grindl becomes involved in a murder case when she is employed as a personal maid to a Broadway actress.
7	"One Angry Grindl"	William D. Russell	Jerry Davis & Lee Loeb	October 27, 1963
Grindl stalemates a murder trial jury on which she is serving because she believes that the accused man is innocent.
8	"Grindl, Witness for the Defense"	Sherman Marks	George O'Hanlon & James O'Hanlon	November 3, 1963
Grindl thinks a miracle has happened when her wheelchair-using employer, Mr. Crow, stands up to accept an insurance settlement check.
9	"Lady Grindl"	William D. Russell	Jay Sommers	November 10, 1963
Grindl fancies that she has inherited a title, castle and land from a British uncle.
10	"The Great Bank Robbery"	King Donovan	Budd Grossman & William Davenport	November 17, 1963
Grindl is able to outwit some bandits scheming to rob the bank where she is working.
11	"Grindl, the Meddler"	Sherman Marks	Burt Styler & Albert E. Lewin	December 8, 1963
Grindl causes an uproar when she decides to involve herself in the family problems of her employer.
12	"The Great Schultz"	Paul Nickell	George O'Hanlon & James O'Hanlon	December 15, 1963
Grindl tries to convince police that her employer, Prof. Schultz, has turned his wife Hilda into a rabbit with his invention, the cosmic regenerator.
13	"Twas the Week Before Christmas"	Christian Nyby	Charles Tannen & Lou Huston	December 22, 1963
While working as a department store Santa Claus, Grindl helps expose a robbery plot.
14	"Grindl, Impractical Nurse"	Sherman Marks	Jay Sommers	December 29, 1963
Grindl decides she is destined to be another Florence Nightingale, but while applying for a job as a nurse's aid, she is mistaken for a patient.
15	"The Lucky Piece"	Barry Shear	Paul David & John L. Greene	January 5, 1964
Grindl helps a government agent trap a notorious gambler for income tax evasion.
16	"Grindl, the Private Eye"	Paul Nickell	Unknown	January 12, 1964
Grindl forsakes the humdrum existence as a maid and decides to emulate the life of a detective.
17	"Grindl's Day Off"	Sherman Marks	Jay Sommers	January 19, 1964
Grindl takes the day off and runs into difficulties at the beauty shop, movie theater and restaurant.
18	"The Mad Bomber"	Charles Barton	Jay Sommers	January 26, 1964
Grindl unwittingly helps the police arrest a confused inventor.
19	"Grindl and the Boodle"	Stanley Prager	Jay Sommers	February 2, 1964
Grindl impersonates a gun moll in order to help investigators recover millions hidden after a hold-up.
20	"Dial G for Grindl"	King Donovan	John McGreevey	February 9, 1964
Grindl is hired by the wife of a man who hires a gang leader to kill his spouse, but Grindl turns a murder plot into a comedy of errors.
21	"Taming of a Tyrant"	Charles Barton	Paul David & John L. Greene	February 16, 1964
Grindl spearheads a household strike against an autocratic butler.
22	"It's in the Bag"	Charles Barton	Charles Tannen & Lou Huston	February 23, 1964
Grindl is in for a surprise when she checks the vacuum cleaner for mothballs and discovers stolen pearls instead.
23	"Grindl, Part-time Wife"	Charles Barton	Ed James & Seaman Jacobs	March 1, 1964
Grindl helps Herman Krumplefelder get a butler's job by posing as his wife, but then realizes that her "husband" is a kleptomaniac.
24	"Active Retirement"	King Donovan	Phil Leslie & Keith Fowler & Jay Sommers	March 8, 1964
Grindl helps save a former railroad engineer from a lonely old age by helping him find the perfect job.
25	"Grindl, Girl Wac"	Charles Barton	Unknown	March 15, 1964
Grindl recalls her days as a WAC when she captured two German officers.
26	"The Big Deception"	King Donovan	Charles Tannen & Lou Huston	March 22, 1964
Grindl helps a young couple impress the wife's parents by "borrowing" a model home in which to entertain them.
27	"Grindl Goes West"	Barry Shear	John L. Greene & Paul David	March 29, 1964
Grindl heads West to hunt for gold and learns that surveyors made a big mistake when she decides to camp on her Las Vegas property.
28	"The Moon Killer"	Christian Nyby	Jerry Davis	April 5, 1964
As Grindl prepares for a lonely birthday celebration, an uninvited stranger enters her apartment through an unlocked window and changes her plans.
29	"There's No Such Thing as a Bad Barracuda"	Charles Barton	Ed Jurist & Bud Nye	April 12, 1964
A teenage gang learns discipline when they win Grindl's services as first prize at a police benefit raffle.
30	"Everything's Coming Up Roses"	Charles Barton	John McGreevey	April 19, 1964
Grindl discovers a horticulturist's bizarre secret for growing prize blooms.
31	"Some Dogs Have the Biggest Mouths"	Charles Barton	Jay Sommers	April 26, 1964
Grindl baffles police with a dog that communicates only with her and identifies a murderer for her.
32	"Aunt Grindl"	Charles Barton	Jay Sommers	May 3, 1964
Grindl believes that she has inherited a fortune, but discovers instead that her "legacy" is an ill-mannered 11-year-old boy (Billy Booth).
