= The Odyssey of Flight 33 =

- The Twilight Zone episode
- Episode no.: Season 2 Episode 18
- Directed by: Justus Addiss
- Written by: Rod Serling
- Production code: 173-3651
- Original air date: February 24, 1961

Guest appearances
- John Anderson as Captain "Skipper" Farver; Paul Comi as First Officer Craig; Sandy Kenyon as Navigator "Magellan" Hatch; Harp McGuire as Flight Engineer Purcell; Beverly Brown as Janie; Wayne Heffley as 2nd Officer Wyatt; Betty Garde as Passenger; Jay Overholts as Passenger; Nancy Rennick as Paula; Lester Fletcher as RAF Man; Robert McCord as Passenger

Episode chronology
← Previous "Twenty Two"	Next → "Mr. Dingle, the Strong"
- The Twilight Zone (1959 TV series, season 2)

"The Odyssey of Flight 33" is episode 54 of the American television anthology series The Twilight Zone, the 18th episode of the second season. An unlikely break of the time barrier finds a commercial airliner sent back into the age of dinosaurs and then to New York City of 1939. The tale is a modern telling of the Flying Dutchman myth, and was written by series creator Rod Serling. It originally aired on February 24, 1961, on CBS.

== Opening narration ==
You're riding on a jet airliner en route from London to New York. You're at 35,000 feet atop an overcast and roughly 55 minutes from Idlewild Airport. But what you've seen occur inside the cockpit of this plane is no reflection on the aircraft or the crew. It's a safe, well-engineered, perfectly designed machine. And the men you've just met are a trained, cool, highly efficient team. The problem is simply that the plane is going too fast, and there is nothing within the realm of knowledge or at least logic to explain it. Unbeknownst to passenger and crew, this airplane is heading into an uncharted region well off the beaten track of commercial travelers—it's moving into the Twilight Zone. What you're about to see we call "The Odyssey of Flight 33".

== Plot ==
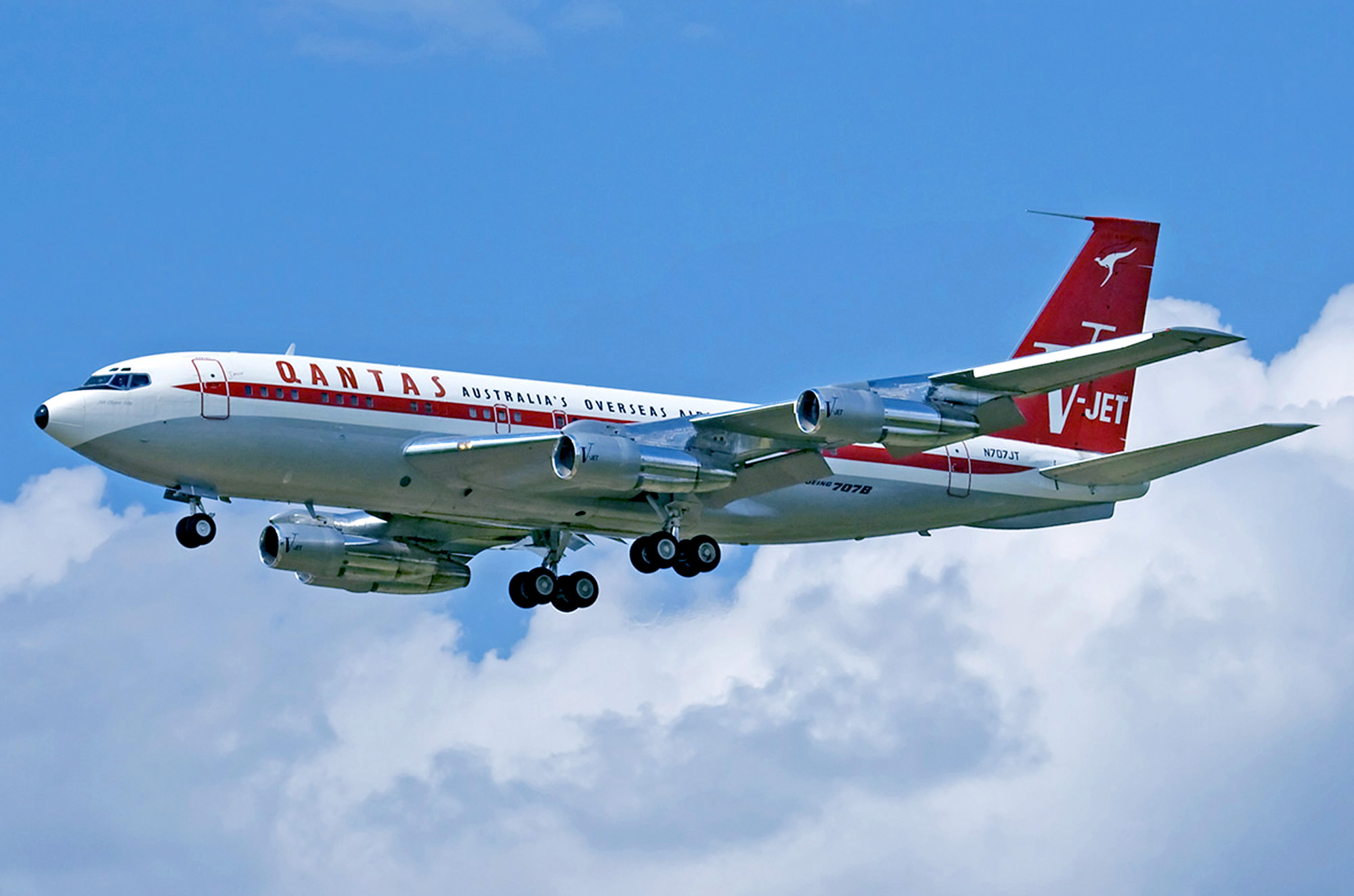
A Boeing 707

Global Airlines Flight 33 is en route from London to New York City. About 55 minutes from Idlewild Airport, Captain Farver and his crew notice that the ground speed of their Boeing 707 is rapidly increasing beyond all reason. Their true airspeed remains constant, so there is no risk of the plane breaking up. They can no longer contact anyone by radio.

The plane travels through a flash of light and severe turbulence; the captain wonders if they have gone through the sound barrier. No damage to the aircraft is apparent. Still unable to contact anyone on the ground, and at the risk of potential collision with other aircraft, Farver finally decides to descend below the clouds. The crew is able to identify the coastline of Manhattan Island and other geographic landmarks, but there is no city. The crew realizes that they have traveled far back in time when they see a grazing dinosaur.

Their only hope of returning to the present day is to increase altitude and speed in an attempt to catch the same "jet stream". After another flash of light and violent shaking, New York City is once again visible, and although they still cannot contact Idlewild, they are able to reach LaGuardia Airport. However, the air traffic controller on the radio does not understand their technological references. The controller eventually clears the aircraft to land at LaGuardia, but orders the captain to report to the CAA office afterward; the captain remarks that they have not called the Federal Aviation Agency by that name in years. The copilot spots the buildings and structures from the New York World's Fair of 1939 below, making the crew realize that they did come back, but "not far enough".

The captain attempts one more ascent before the fuel runs out, in an effort to return the plane to 1961. He addresses the passengers, explaining that they have traveled back in time. "All I ask of you is that you remain calm," he tells the passengers over the public address system, "...and pray."

== Closing narration ==
A Global jet airliner, en route from London to New York on an uneventful afternoon in the year 1961, but now reported overdue and missing, and by now, searched for on land, sea, and air by anguished human beings, fearful of what they'll find. But you and I know where she is. You and I know what's happened. So if some moment, any moment, you hear the sound of jet engines flying atop the overcast—engines that sound searching and lost—engines that sound desperate—shoot up a flare or do something. That would be Global 33 trying to get home—from the Twilight Zone.

== Production notes ==
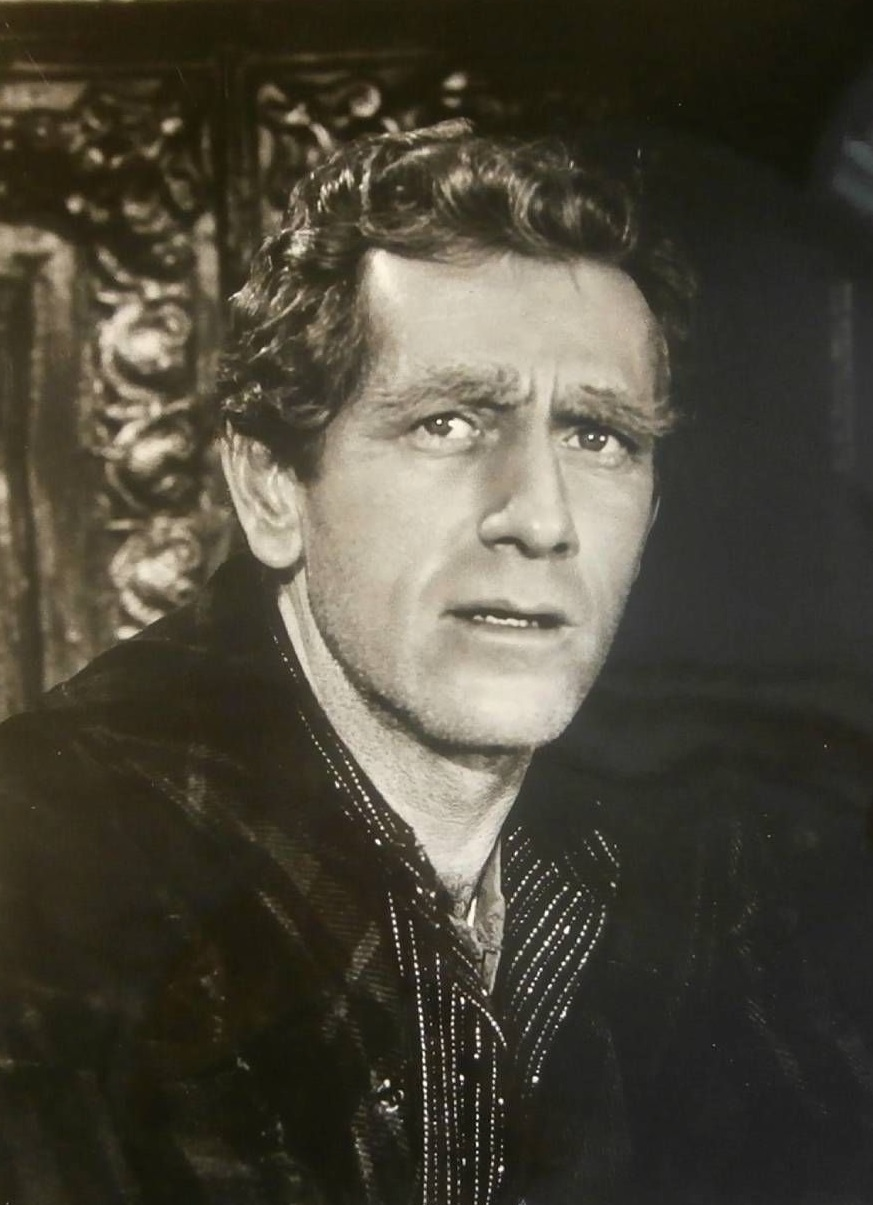
Actor John Anderson starred as Captain Farver

Serling originally developed the idea for the show when he learned that American Airlines had a mockup of a 707 interior, previously used for flight attendant training, that they would make available to TV or film production companies.

Serling's brother, aviation writer Robert J. Serling, helped Serling with the cockpit dialogue for the show by discussing the show's premise with a Trans World Airlines captain; after the show aired, several pilots later wrote to say that they thought the cockpit dialogue was among the most authentic ever in a television show.

The brontosaurus model and miniature jungle set from the 1960 film Dinosaurus! were used for the stop-motion animation.

LaGuardia Airport, although it had opened in October 1939 (thus was open during the second half of the 1939–40 World's Fair held in New York City), was not officially named after Mayor Fiorello H. La Guardia until 1947; up to that point, its official name was New York Municipal Airport. However, the nickname "LaGuardia Field" was in common use two weeks after the airport opened.

== Graphic novel ==
This episode was one of several Twilight Zone stories adapted as a graphic novel. The adaptation expands upon the television episode, including a subplot involving several passengers and flight crew, as well as updating the story to 1973. It also adds a time jump to the future.

== See also ==
- List of The Twilight Zone (1959 TV series) episodes
- Manifest (TV series)
- The Flight That Disappeared (1961 film)
- The Langoliers (miniseries)
