= I Dream of Genie =

- The Twilight Zone episode
- Episode no.: Season 4 Episode 12
- Directed by: Robert Gist
- Written by: John Furia Jr.
- Production code: 4860
- Original air date: March 21, 1963

Guest appearances
- Howard Morris as George P. Hanley; Molly Dodd as May; Milton Parsons as P.R. Man / Scientist; Patricia Barry as Ann Lawson; Jack Albertson as Genie; Mark Miller as Roger Hackett; James Millhollin as Masters; Loring Smith as E.T. Watson; Bob Hastings as Sam; Joyce Jameson as Starlet

Episode chronology
← Previous "The Parallel"	Next → "The New Exhibit"
- The Twilight Zone (1959 TV series) (season 4)

"I Dream of Genie" is an episode of the American television anthology series The Twilight Zone. This episode is a comedy about a man who finds a genie and struggles to decide what to wish for, pondering the question through a series of hypothetical dream sequences.

== Opening narration ==
Meet Mr. George P. Hanley, a man life treats without deference, honor or success. Waiters serve his soup cold. Elevator operators close doors in his face. Mothers never bother to wait up for the daughters he dates. George is a creature of humble habits and tame dreams. He's an ordinary man, Mr. Hanley, but at this moment the accidental possessor of a very special gift, the kind of gift that measures men against their dreams, the kind of gift most of us might ask for first and possibly regret to the last, if we, like Mr. George P. Hanley, were about to plunge head-first and unaware into our own personal Twilight Zone.

== Plot ==
George P. Hanley, a shy office worker, shops for a birthday gift for Ann Lawson, the secretary in the office where he works. The gift store has just received a heavily soiled oil lamp as part of a random assortment from a distributor. Believing it to be worthless, the owner smooth-talks George into buying the lamp for $20. He takes it to work, but is beaten to the punch by his brash co-worker Roger, who gives Ann a skimpy nightgown. After Ann thanks Roger with a kiss, a despondent George takes the lamp home. When George rubs the lamp while cleaning it, a genie emerges. While he only offers one wish rather than the traditional three, he gives George time to consider what he should wish for.

Throughout the evening and next day, George considers his choices through various daydreams. He first thinks about wishing for love and dreams of being married to Ann as a successful movie star who will not be torn away from her career. However, George discovers she is having an affair with fellow movie star Roger. He concludes that in any circumstance, he would ultimately lose a woman like Ann.

The next day, as Roger is in the boss's office discussing a promotion to head bookkeeper – a position George believes he is up for as well – George contemplates having money. He dreams of being wealthy tycoon G. Peter Hanley, with Roger as his chauffeur and Ann as his financial assistant. However, he slowly realizes that being able to immediately buy anything he wants without having to wait or struggle for it, and having the capacity to give away vast sums is unsatisfying. He awakes from this fantasy to the news that Roger has won the promotion.

While taking his dog Attila on a walk, George considers power as his third prospective wish and imagines being President of the United States. Though initially successful, he is soon paralyzed by indecision when faced with a global UFO crisis. George realizes the problem with all three wishes is that while his circumstances change, he himself remains a loser, and that he can only improve his life by changing himself. This inspires him to finally decide on a wish.

Sometime later, a homeless man finds the lamp in a garbage can and polishes it. The genie who emerges is George, accompanied by Attila, who offers three wishes to the finder on the condition that the lamp be returned to the alley afterwards for another needy person to find.

== Closing narration ==
Mr. George P. Hanley, former vocation: jerk. Present vocation: genie. George P. Hanley: a most ordinary man whom life treated without deference, honor or success, but a man wise enough to decide on a most extraordinary wish that makes him the contented, permanent master of his own altruistic Twilight Zone.

== See also ==
- Walter Mitty, a similar meek male character, prone to daydreaming.

== Bibliography ==
- DeVoe, Bill. (2008). Trivia from The Twilight Zone. Albany, GA: Bear Manor Media. ISBN 978-1-59393-136-0
- Grams, Martin. (2008). The Twilight Zone: Unlocking the Door to a Television Classic. Churchville, MD: OTR Publishing. ISBN 978-0-9703310-9-0
