= The Parallel =

- The Twilight Zone episode
- Episode no.: Season 4 Episode 11
- Directed by: Alan Crosland Jr.
- Written by: Rod Serling
- Production code: 4859
- Original air date: March 14, 1963

Guest appearances
- Steve Forrest as Robert Gaines; Jacqueline Scott as Helen Gaines; Shari Lee Bernath as Maggie Gaines; Frank Aletter as Colonel Bill Connacher; Philip Abbott as General Eaton; Morgan Jones as Captain; William Sargent as Project Manager; Paul Comi as Psychiatrist

Episode chronology
← Previous "No Time Like the Past"	Next → "I Dream of Genie"
- The Twilight Zone season 4

"The Parallel" is episode 113 of the American television anthology series The Twilight Zone. In this episode an astronaut returns from a voyage to find the world not quite the same as he remembers it. It was an early example of the concept of mirror or alternate universes. The 1969 British science fiction film Journey to the Far Side of the Sun bore conceptual similarities, as did the Star Trek: The Original Series episode "Mirror, Mirror", although the differences between the characters in the two Star Trek alternate universes were quite noticeable. The concept has also been used by both DC Comics and Marvel Comics in their comic books and movies.

== Opening narration ==
In the vernacular of space, this is T minus one hour. Sixty minutes before a human being named Major Robert Gaines is lifted off from the Mother Earth and rocketed into the sky, farther and longer than any man ahead of him. Call this one of the first faltering steps of man to sever the umbilical cord of gravity and stretch out a fingertip toward an unknown. Shortly, we'll join this astronaut named Gaines and embark on an adventure, because the environs overhead—the stars, the sky, the infinite space—are all part of a vast question mark known as the Twilight Zone.

== Plot ==
An astronaut, Major Robert Gaines, is orbiting Earth in his space capsule. Suddenly, his communication systems stop functioning and he blacks out, waking up on Earth with no memory of his return. He appears to be none the worse for his experiences and is released to the custody of his family.

However, inconsistencies quickly pop up. His house has a white picket fence that he has never seen, though his wife, Helen, insists that it was there when they bought the house. He sees his rank insignia on his collar and in a photograph have changed to Colonel when he knows himself to be a Major, although Helen insists he's been a Colonel for months. Helen kisses him to reassure him and instantly knows he isn't the same. She tries to call Gaines's friend, a fellow officer, but Gaines interrupts her and she says she was just calling him to invite him and his wife over to dinner. When Maggie brings coffee to Gaines, he stops her from putting sugar in his cup and she says he's different and something is wrong. When Helen tells him that he's just different but she can't explain it, he insists on turning himself in for examination. When he also insists that the President of the United States is John F. Kennedy, a man whom no one else has ever heard of, Gaines concludes that he has slipped into a parallel universe. His acquaintances see this as nonsense until a mechanic reports his space capsule is not completely identical to the one he was sent out in. Gaines is summoned to examine the capsule, but when he approaches it he is gradually returned to the point at which he left his own universe.

He lands his craft safely and reports what happened to his superiors. They are prepared to write it off as a nightmare, but controllers on the ground subsequently receive another transmission—from Colonel Robert Gaines. The transmission cuts out a few seconds later, and the Colonel disappears from radar. The Major returns home and happily confirms that his daughter now recognizes him and the white picket fence is absent.

== Closing narration ==
Major Robert Gaines, a latter-day voyager just returned from an adventure. Submitted to you without any recommendation as to belief or disbelief. You can accept or reject; you pays your money and you takes your choice. But credulous or incredulous, don't bother to ask anyone for proof that it could happen. The obligation is a reverse challenge: prove that it couldn't. This happens to be the Twilight Zone.

== Reception ==
Cult television website anorakzone.com ranked the episode the fourth-worst of season 4, calling it "dull". The site added that the script "makes no real effort to test the new format to its limits" and the story feels purposely padded to satisfy the longer runtime. It also stated that Forrest "fails to rise [sic] his performance above a straight recital of exposition".

In a mixed review, Zack Handlen of The A.V. Club gave "The Parallel" a rating of C+. He commented that while the episode "makes a reasonable case for itself in its first half" with some "credible worldbuilding", it suffers from a lack of suspense and any obvious danger to the protagonist. He also described the premise as "too expected" and "too mundane", adding that the story "completely falls apart" in a "lazily" written second half which fails to exploit the implications of the ending.

According to Jacob Trussell, the episode "spins its wheels for 20 minutes, dragging out a second-act reveal that the audience has already guessed". He commented that this represents "a great example of why Season Four's experiment in hour-long stories didn't always work in the series' favor."

Paste magazine commented that the performances "[lack] energy, and the ending is more of a self-fulfilling prophecy than a genuinely surprising twist." DVD Talk called the acting "poor" and argued that the resolution "completely cheats the audience out of the time spent watching the episode".

== Legacy ==
"Parallels", an episode of Star Trek: The Next Generation, has plot elements similar to this story.

"Post Traumatic Slide Syndrome," an episode of Sliders (the entire premise of which deals with four people who "Slide" into parallel dimensions through a wormhole, particularly in its first two seasons) centers on the four main characters finding a dimension which they believe to be their own, with only one character noticing the minor changes until the climax of the episode.

== Bibliography ==
- DeVoe, Bill (2008). Trivia from The Twilight Zone. Albany, Georgia: Bear Manor Media. ISBN 978-1-59393-136-0.
- Grams, Martin (2008). The Twilight Zone: Unlocking the Door to a Television Classic. Churchville, Maryland: OTR Publishing. ISBN 978-0-9703310-9-0.
- Sander, Gordon F. (1992). Serling: The Rise And Twilight of Television's Last Angry Man. New York City: Penguin Books.
- Zicree, Marc Scott (1982). The Twilight Zone Companion (second ed.). Sillman-James Press.
