= Mikhail Rakitin =

Character from the novel "The Brothers Karamazov"

Mikhail Osipovich Rakitin
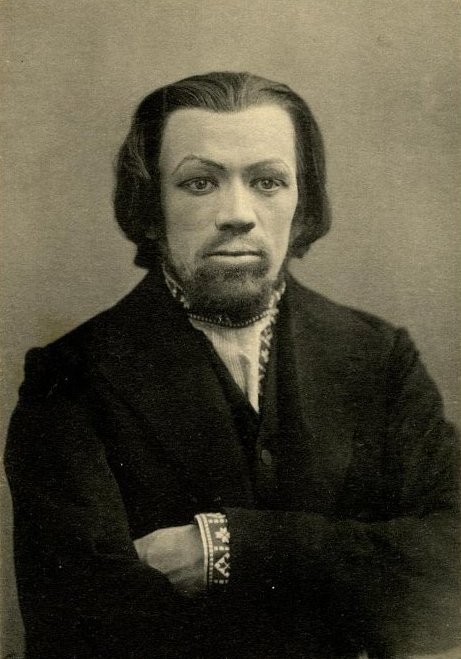
- Vladimir Vasilyevich Tezavrovsky as Mikhail Rakitin in the MAT 1910 performance
- First appearance: The Brothers Karamazov
- Created by: Fyodor Dostoevsky
- Based on: Valentina Khokhryakova

In-universe information
- Gender: Male
- Nationality: Russia

Mikhail Osipovich Rakitin (Russian: Михаи́л О́сипович Раки́тин) is a secondary character in the novel The Brothers Karamazov by the 19th-century Russian writer Fyodor Dostoevsky. A young man at the time of the novel's events, Rakitin is a seminarian receiving a spiritual education due to his status as a priest's son, but he has no intention of becoming a priest. He pretends to be a friend of Alyosha Karamazov for his own benefit. After an unsuccessful attempt to bring about the "disgrace of the righteous," he declares he no longer wishes to associate with Alyosha. Feeling contempt from other characters in the novel, he plans to leave the monastery and go to St. Petersburg to become a writer. The character of Mikhail Rakitin emerged from Dostoevsky's observations of anonymous abusive letters, his particular views on the church's public service, and his polemics with several prominent publicists and journalists who served as prototypes for the character.

Critics describe Rakitin as a malicious, talentless, insignificant, and petty character who has lost his feelings and is trapped in false reasoning. While outwardly maintaining piety, he is already an atheist, does not believe in God, and mocks everything, spreading disbelief around him. No matter how happy the future depicted by Rakitin may seem, it appears false. Critics note Rakitin's Karamazov-like sensuality, elements of nihilism, traits of a 1860s radical, a future socialist and critic, and a supporter of European enlightenment. His unprincipled careerism is particularly highlighted. The appearance of a person who thinks only about how to best establish himself in this world —calculating, meticulous, and realistically minded— is characteristic of a time when the Karamazovs, preoccupied with women and eternal questions, become irrelevant. For Rakitin, there is no difference between continuing a religious career or abruptly switching to criticizing it, as it does not matter whom he serves. Dostoevsky emphasizes that Rakitin is not an exceptional phenomenon but rather a new type of hero, embodying modern Russia. Despite the unpleasantness of this image, such people are gradually filling the country, shaping Russia's path.

Throughout the novel, the Karamazov brothers are contrasted with Rakitin. Alyosha considers him a friend and is tempted by impure thoughts about his father's murder and the sanctity of Elder Zosima. Rakitin also shifts Alyosha's focus from spiritual concerns to external carnal desires, violating church rules and suggesting Alyosha do the same. However, Alyosha manages to resist this influence. Dmitry Karamazov deeply despises Rakitin, noting his inferiority and inadequacy. As a socialist, Rakitin claims one can love humanity without God, a view the devout Dmitry completely rejects. The base materialist Rakitin serves as a double for the lofty dreamer Ivan Karamazov, as both are driven by selfish consciousness, which overshadows Ivan's reflections on eternal questions and Rakitin's petty pragmatism. At the core of their selfish consciousness lie pride and vanity, preventing them from understanding the loftiness of Alyosha, Dmitry, or Grushenka's principles and selfless motives.

== Creation of the character ==
The character of Mikhail Rakitin arose from Dostoevsky's observations of anonymous abusive letters, whose author he imagined as a new modern type of critic, embodied in The Brothers Karamazov. The writer believed that such vain, self-proclaimed geniuses with "impotent laughter" and "legacy of baseness" inherited from skeptical fathers could serve as a good subject for a separate novella. Dostoevsky noted that this character would have suited Gogol better, but he decided to include him in the novel. The idea was realized in the image of the seminarian-careerist Rakitin.

Additionally, the inclusion of a character like Rakitin was tied to Dostoevsky's particular views on the church's public service. The writer shared the opinion that the clergy had become a closed professional caste by the end of the 19th century. This detachment from the people within the clergy gradually led to significant erosion of religious consciousness from within, resulting in the emergence of atheists and revolutionaries in theological institutions. The characteristic chapter title the Seminarian-Careerist underscores that Rakitin belongs to this type of character.

== Prototype ==
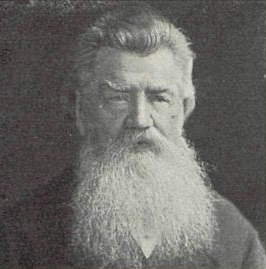
Grigory Eliseev

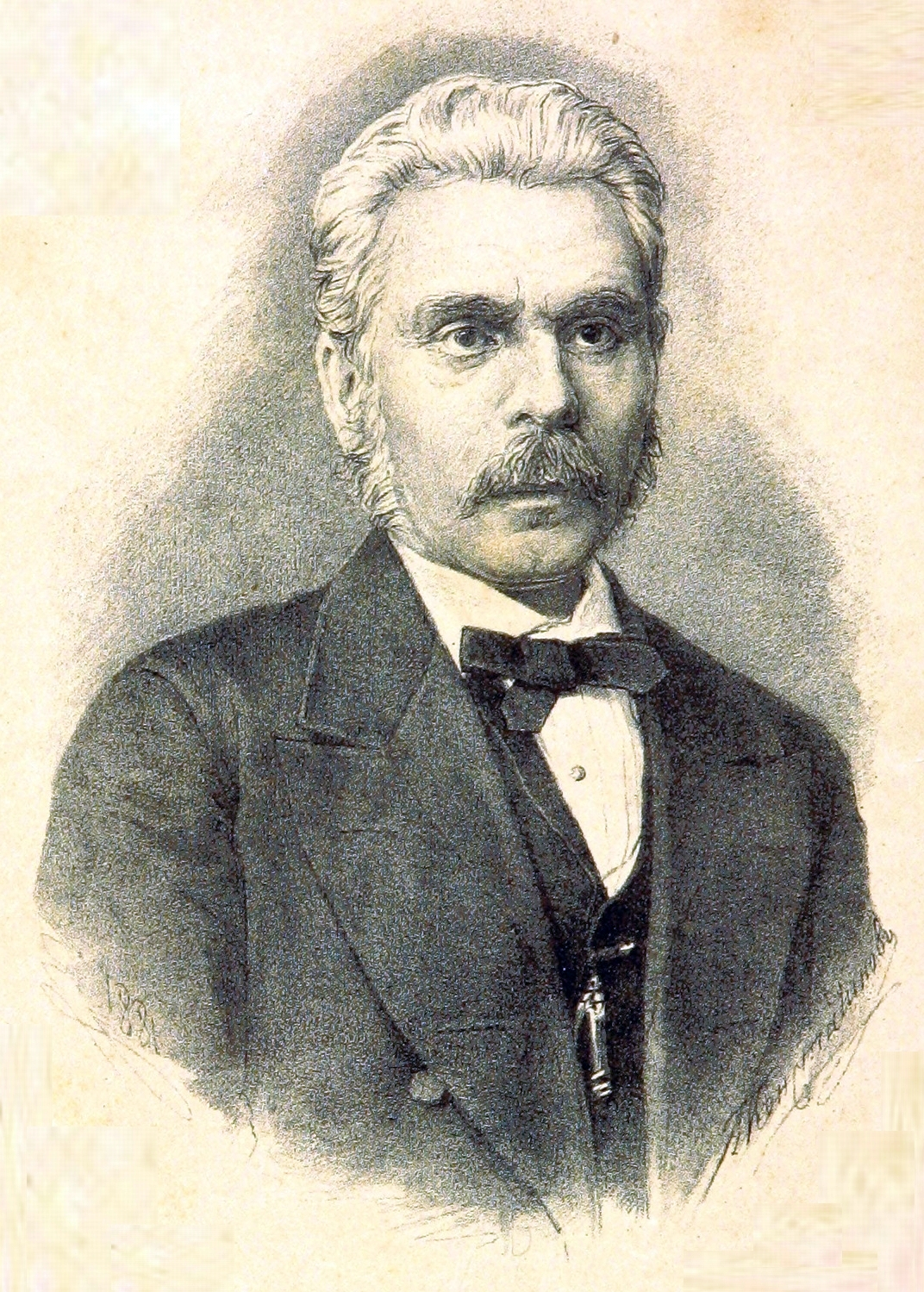
Grigory Blagosvetlov

Among the prototypes for the character, researchers identify prominent publicists and journalists Grigory Blagosvetlov and Grigory Eliseev; the satirical poet and translator Dmitry Minaev; and the publicist and educator Mikhail Rodevich.

The kinship between Rakitin and Grushenka Svetlova may point to Blagosvetlov. Mentioning Grushenka's surname only once during the trial, Dostoevsky suggests paying attention to it. Meanwhile, the name Mikhail may refer to Rodevich, and the full name may allude to the character Mikhail Rakitin from Turgenev's comedy A Month in the Country. The comedy was highly popular during the novel's writing, so, given the similarity in the characters' life situations in both works, the name coincidence does not seem accidental.

Another prototype could be a namesake from the story A Strange Story by Yakov Butkov. The story's beginning, the hero's character, and its ending align with Rakitin's arc. Both characters' practicality was emphasized, as well as the fact that Dostoevsky knew Butkov and followed his stories.

== Role in the novel ==
At the time of the novel's events, Mikhail Rakitin is a seminarian, pursuing a spiritual education due to his status as a priest's son, but he has no intention of becoming a priest. He aspires to become a writer and gain fame, a common ambition among seminarians from poor families. Rakitin waits for Alyosha at a bend in a deserted road after the younger Karamazov leaves Elder Zosima's hermitage. Their meeting is not coincidental, as Rakitin promised Grushenka to bring Alyosha to her, asking for twenty-five rubles for this service. At the same time, he plans to spread rumors about the event. However, Rakitin's plan to facilitate the "disgrace of the righteous" fails. Irritated by this, Rakitin sharply reacts to Alyosha's request not to be angry or judge others: "Your elder charged you with that earlier, and now you've fired your elder's words at me, Alyoshenka, God's little man". On the way from Grushenka's, Rakitin tries to speak ill of her and Dmitry. Alyosha's indifference further wounds the seminarian, "as if a fresh wound had been touched," leading him to declare he no longer wishes to associate with Alyosha. After this, Rakitin "disliked meeting" and "hardly spoke with him, even bowing with effort".

Rakitin visited the home of the landowner Katerina Osipovna Khokhlakova, aiming to gain access to her wealth, while forming a love triangle with Khokhlakova and Perkhotin, which parodies the love triangle of Dmitry, Katerina, and Ivan. However, the landowner bars Rakitin from her home, as she later tells Alyosha: "I suddenly stood up and said to Mikhail Ivanovich: it pains me to say, but I no longer wish to receive you in my house. So I threw him out." Feeling contempt from other characters, Rakitin wants to leave the monastery and go to St. Petersburg to become a writer, seeking to rectify the situation where he is looked down upon. After Fyodor Karamazov's murder, he considers writing a work based on the theory that the environment breeds criminals: Dmitry "could not help but kill, consumed by his environment".

After Dmitry Karamazov is accused of murder, Rakitin attempts to use the logic of primitive everyday positivism and egoism to pull Dmitry back from his righteous path to his initial state as a sinner. Rakitin grows closer to Dmitry, visiting him in prison, but Alyosha, who supports and blesses his brother for the suffering ahead, hinders his influence. At Dmitry's trial, the liberal Rakitin presents the tragedy of the crime as a "product of outdated serfdom morals and a Russia mired in disorder", captivating the audience. However, after he speaks contemptuously of Grushenka, the defense attorney manages to discredit him.

== Character analysis ==
Mikhail Rakitin is a prominent but not central figure in the novel The Brothers Karamazov. As a secondary character, he does not participate in the struggle between the novel's two opposing ideological systems, merely echoing others' thoughts and using them when it suits him. Critics describe Rakitin as a "hardened opportunist, concerned only with his own calculations", yet possessing some sense of dignity. Alongside Pyotr Petrovich Luzhin from Crime and Punishment, Ganya Ivolgin, and Ivan Ptitsyn from The Idiot, he belongs to the type of "vulgar and prosaically self-satisfied people who feel at ease in the established forms of bourgeois life".

Rakitin easily connects with people when it serves his interests but is so cautious that he ends up friendless. He recognizes his own barren nature, lacking light, insignificant, and petty, making it easy for him to exploit others. Rakitin is skilled at interacting with people, discerning what matters to them. The landowner Katerina Osipovna Khokhlakova considered him "the most pious and devout young man—so adept was he at handling everyone and presenting himself according to their desires, if he saw the slightest benefit in it." The investigator also spoke well of him. Meanwhile, Dmitry says: "The Karamazovs are not scoundrels but philosophers," while Rakitin is "not a philosopher but a serf".

According to Dostoevsky, intolerance of others is a European trait that narrows the Russian soul. The malicious, talentless denier Mikhail Rakitin cannot share with others or wait to receive; he only desires and knows how to take. The writer portrays a character trapped in false reasoning and devoid of feelings. Due to his egoism, Rakitin is ready to use any means to achieve his goals, as emphasized in the scene with Alyosha, where the seminarian exploits human grief. Dostoevsky particularly draws readers' attention to the fact that Rakitin is not an exceptional phenomenon but a new type of hero in modern Russia: "In recent times, so many profiteers have latched onto the common cause, distorting everything they touch for their own benefit, that they have utterly corrupted the entire endeavor".

=== Religion and morality ===
Alyosha: "The people won't allow it".

Rakitin: "What if they won't? What's to be done with the masses, then? Cut them down! Scatter them! Silence them! That's the answer! Enlightenment is more important than the masses!..."

Rakitin had come from Grushenka angry and spiteful. Alyosha said nothing, and Rakitin went on:

"Religion's all nonsense. You see that yourself. It's just a question of discipline. Discipline and a good education – that's what it wants. You must read Buckle, you know".

... "We'll root it out, root it out completely", Rakitin muttered, maliciously".

— Dialogue between Rakitin and Alyosha about religion and the people from the novel's draft.

At the time of the novel's events, Rakitin is a seminarian, pursuing a spiritual education due to his status as a priest's son. However, while outwardly maintaining piety, he is already an atheist, does not believe in God, and mocks everything. Dmitry Karamazov draws attention to Rakitin's attitude toward God: "Rakitin doesn't love God, oh, he really doesn't! That's their sorest spot, all of them! But they hide it. They lie. They pretend". Critics note Rakitin's Karamazov-like sensuality, pointing out that while the passion-driven Karamazovs believe in God, Rakitin submits only to his own nature, not divine law.

Rakitin participates in discussions about the immortality of the soul and morality, writing a spiritual pamphlet titled The Life of the Elder Zosima, Reposed in God, but unlike Ivan Karamazov and Elder Zosima, he holds a more rational stance. The religious Zosima believes in immortality and virtue; the atheist Ivan denies both immortality and morality; Rakitin, however, sees the possibility of virtue and the organization of human society without faith in God or the soul's immortality. According to Rakitin, love for freedom, equality, and fraternity will replace humanity's faith in God. Critics note that no matter how happy this future may seem, as depicted by Rakitin, it appears false.

Rakitin not only lacks faith in God but actively spreads disbelief around him. He views literary criticism as a convenient means to convey his views to others. The character's ideological role manifests in his disbelief not only in God but also in the devil, taking on the devil's role in tempting the righteous from the true path. Instead of helping Alyosha, Rakitin seeks to corrupt him to witness the "fall of the righteous". The seminarian constantly tries to push those around him to betray themselves and God, as this is his natural state. Critics note that the character's surname symbolizes death, though Dostoevsky avoids using the biblical aspen.

=== New type of hero in modern Russia ===
Critics highlight Rakitin's unprincipled careerism, devoid of original ideas. In Dostoevsky's own words, Rakitin "had connections everywhere and gathered information everywhere. His heart was very restless and envious." The writer also notes that Rakitin "knew absolutely everything in their little town." At the trial, "it turned out that he knew everything ... he had been everywhere, seen everything, spoken to everyone, and knew the biography of Fyodor Pavlovich and all the Karamazovs in detail". Rakitin aims to become a critic for a radical journal, thinking only of profit and publishing in the capital's newspaper Rumors. His image recalls Liputin, a character from the novel Demons. Rakitin is concerned solely with his career. He could become a false version of Zosima, continuing a career in the bureaucratized church and becoming an archimandrite, or a false version of Ivan, moving to St. Petersburg and becoming a critic for a journal.

Nakamura concludes that Rakitin's appearance in the novel is characteristic of a time when philosophers like the Karamazovs, preoccupied with women and eternal questions, become obsolete. A new type of hero emerges—"a person thinking about how to best establish himself in this world, calculating, meticulous, and realistically minded." Thus, Rakitin embodies modern Russia. Despite the unpleasantness of this image, such people are gradually filling the country, shaping Russia's path.

Rakitin appears as a practical businessman, resembling Western-style entrepreneurs. Though he discusses humanity and its morality, he is indifferent to these issues. Critics note that this "neither hot nor cold" type of modern Westernized liberal was particularly detestable to Dostoevsky. Rakitin is capable of overcoming any moral barriers to achieve his goals and is indifferent to higher metaphysical reality. Sociologist Bachinin characterized this type as the philosophical concept of the "human-machine." Rakitin's prosaic-pragmatic existence prevents him from grasping essential life meanings; his thoughts and feelings are mundane, comparable to a spiritually impoverished living automaton. In this sense, Rakitin symbolizes a significant portion of the Russian intelligentsia of non-noble origin at the time—persistent and morally unscrupulous, striving to achieve their goals by any means.

=== Socialist undertones ===
In Dostoevsky's drafts, Rakitin is portrayed more distinctly as a 1860s radical, a future socialist and critic, a supporter of European enlightenment, and an admirer of Henry Thomas Buckle. Rakitin explains Fyodor Pavlovich Karamazov's murder as a result of Russia's unfavorable social reality, seeing it as a consequence of outdated serfdom remnants and contemporary social disorder.

For Dostoevsky, morality is untenable without religion, making a just and free society impossible without faith. Rakitin expresses an opposing socialist view: "Humanity will find the strength within itself to live for virtue, even without believing in the soul's immortality! It will find it in love for freedom, equality, and fraternity". The possibility of a society without religion is championed by Rakitin precisely because, as a morally flawed character, he "dooms his position to inherent distrust from readers".

Ivan Karamazov predicts that if Rakitin manages to lead a journal in St. Petersburg, he will publish it "in a liberal and atheistic direction with a socialist undertone, even with a slight gloss of socialism." Critics note that this socialist undertone in Rakitin is, in fact, a false version of some of Ivan's own views. Through his socialist ideas, Rakitin vulgarizes Ivan Karamazov's perspectives.

=== Elements of nihilism ===
Critics have noted Rakitin's nihilism. In The Brothers Karamazov, Dostoevsky illustrates a decline in the level of nihilism through three characters. From Ivan Karamazov to Mikhail Rakitin, and then to Kolya Krasotkin, the concept of nihilism diminishes. For Ivan, the primary concern is to "resolve the idea," and his problems appear significant and serious. With Rakitin, the idea vanishes, leaving only concern for his own career. Kudryavtsev called him a typical "public guy" of nihilism, whose religious work and pursuit of rapid career advancement only underscore his service to nihilism. Meanwhile, Rakitin also spreads nihilist ideas, gaining a disciple in Kolya Krasotkin, who lacks doubts or reflections entirely, relying on Rakitin's limited clichés and axioms.

Rakitin's worldview aligns with the philosophy of Prince Valkovsky from Dostoevsky's novel Humiliated and Insulted. The nihilist Rakitin is characterized by a lack of individuality. For him, there is no difference between continuing a religious career or abruptly switching to its criticism, as it does not matter whom he serves. His primary goal is to possess, regardless of the means. Rakitin "knew how to handle everyone and present himself according to their desires, if he saw the slightest benefit in it".

== Rakitin and the Karamazov brothers ==
Throughout the novel, the Karamazov brothers are constantly compared to Rakitin. In his work, Dostoevsky explored only those ideas that passed through his characters' hearts and souls. Rakitin, however, approaches both religion and civic ideals with equal self-interest. Dmitry Karamazov condemns him for his lack of faith, calling him a careerist and unbeliever, while Ivan and Alyosha note that his socialist undertones will not prevent him from accumulating wealth.

=== Friendship with Alyosha ===
He made haste to go by the path through the copse, which divided the hermitage from the monastery, unable to endure even the sound of his own thoughts, so overburdened was he by them. The walk was not long, about five hundred paces; it was very unlikely that he would meet anyone at that hour, but suddenly, at the first turn of the path, he saw Rakitin.

Rakitin was waiting for someone.

"Are you waiting for me?" Alyosha asked, going up to him.

"Yes, for you", Rakitin laughed.

— The meeting of Rakitin and Alyosha after Zosima's death.

Alyosha was very attached to Rakitin, so he was troubled by his friend's unconscious dishonesty, though Rakitin considered himself "a man of the highest honesty". Rakitin, however, lies about his friendship with Alyosha, as Alyosha's closeness to Elder Zosima was something Rakitin hoped to exploit.

Hoping to witness the "disgrace of the righteous" and Alyosha's fall from saint to sinner, Rakitin waits for him at a bend in a deserted road from Zosima's hermitage to take him to Grushenka. Earlier, Rakitin had already tried to tempt Alyosha with impure thoughts. In the chapter "The Seminarian-Careerist," Rakitin senses a possible murder and directly tells the younger Karamazov: "In your family, there will be this crime. It will happen between your brothers and your rich little father". In this conversation, Rakitin also forces Alyosha to admit he had similar thoughts. However, Alyosha generally managed to resist his influence, which greatly angered the seminarian. After Zosima's death, Alyosha was depressed and sad, feeling resentment toward God for life's unfairness. At the moment of his fall, as even the thought of renouncing God is a sin, a tempter-devil appears in the guise of the seminarian-careerist Rakitin. Seeing Alyosha's inner turmoil, Rakitin aims to complete his plan.

First, he denies the possibility of miraculous signs of Zosima's sanctity, demonstrating the skepticism and rationalism of part of the clergy against the blind, senseless fanaticism and ritualism of another part. Then, Rakitin shifts Alyosha's focus from spiritual concerns to external carnal desires, violating church rules and suggesting Alyosha do the same. The seminarian expects Alyosha to refuse, but, disillusioned with his past life, Alyosha suddenly agrees. As a result, Rakitin invites him to Grushenka to fully exploit Alyosha's current state. Dostoevsky emphasizes that Rakitin was "a serious man and undertook nothing without a beneficial goal for himself." Beyond the vengeful aim of seeing Alyosha fall "from saint to sinner," Rakitin also had a material goal. However, Alyosha is too deeply grieving Elder Zosima's death, so Rakitin's plan is doomed to fail.

In the scene where Rakitin brings Alyosha to Grushenka, Dostoevsky aims to show that God permits human evil, transforming it into good. The vengeful and selfish seminarian fails to push Alyosha toward ruin, as God turns his evil intent into a blessing for the righteous Karamazov. This frustrates and angers Rakitin. Alyosha's calmness in response to all attempts to anger or offend him further irritates him. He declares he no longer wishes to associate with Alyosha, realizing he cannot influence his soul, and slips away into an alley. The symbolic meaning of this act is revealed in Alyosha's words: "Rakitin went into the alley. As long as Rakitin thinks of his grievances, he will always go into the alley ... But the road ... the road is wide, straight, bright, crystalline, and the sun is at its end...."

=== Disagreements with Dmitry ===
Dmitry Karamazov deeply despises Rakitin, particularly noting the seminarian's lack of humor: "They don't understand jokes either—that's their main flaw. They never understand a joke." This trait highlights Rakitin's general inferiority and inadequacy. For Dostoevsky, a world without laughter cannot be whole, and excessive seriousness cannot be truly authentic. Rakitin's image discredits most of his statements, but his remarks about Karamazovism are an exception, as they align with the author's views. Similarly, his statement that unrestrained natures like Dmitry Karamazov "need the sensation of baseness in their fall as much as the sensation of supreme nobility" holds true. Rakitin interprets Elder Zosima's bow to Dmitry as an acknowledgment that he will soon commit a crime: "In my opinion, the old man is truly prescient: he sniffed out a crime. It stinks in your family." In a conversation with Alyosha, he bluntly states that Dmitry will kill his father.

At the trial, Rakitin, embodying a liberal with a touch of socialism to the extent that it is advantageous and safe, presents Dmitry Karamazov's crime as a "product of outdated serfdom morals and a Russia mired in disorder, suffering without proper institutions". Arkady Dolinin emphasized that this choice was not accidental, and Dostoevsky had his reasons for it. Even when acknowledging Dmitry's positive trait of honesty, Rakitin, due to his nature, manages to focus on something else: "Let him be an honest man, Mitenka (he's foolish but honest); but he's a sensualist. That's his definition and his entire inner essence". However, Rakitin's materialism prevents him from seeing the full truth about Dmitry, whose sensuality is not his entire essence. Rakitin characterizes him as a "product of a Russia mired in disorder," which is accurate regarding the character's inner turmoil, which he has more than others.

Dmitry Karamazov and Mikhail Rakitin also differ in their views on religion. As a socialist, Rakitin claims one can love humanity without God, a stance the devout Dmitry wholly rejects, insulting him for such remarks: "Only a snotty little mushroom could say that". After being accused of murder, Dmitry's faith in God enables him to fight the evil within himself and resolve to accept suffering. During this time, Rakitin, as with Alyosha, tries to hinder him with his "logic of primitive everyday positivism and egoism," attempting to pull Dmitry back from his righteous path to his initial sinful state.

=== Debate with Ivan ===
The seminarian Mikhail Rakitin is directly contrasted with Alyosha as his antipode but also serves as a diminished parallel to the independent and selfless thinker Ivan Karamazov. Rakitin is depicted as crude in understanding others' feelings and sensations but acutely aware of anything concerning himself. Philologist Meletinsky noted "Dostoevsky's characteristic pathos" in creating such a base materialist double for the lofty dreamer Ivan Karamazov. Rakitin is described as a "talentless liberal sack", a serf with a dry and flat soul, constantly aiming to "seize the moment by the collar" for any petty gain to amass wealth. Yet, the two are similar, as both are driven by selfish consciousness, which overshadows Ivan's reflections on eternal questions and Rakitin's petty "common sense." The pride and vanity at the core of their selfish consciousness prevent them from understanding the loftiness of Alyosha, Dmitry, or Grushenka's principles and selfless motives, which they misinterpret based on their own experiences.

Ivan Karamazov holds that nothing can compel people to love one another; only faith in possible immortality creates the appearance of love on earth, not humanity's natural state. Without faith in immortality, nothing remains immoral, and everything is permitted. In a conversation with Alyosha, Rakitin angrily rejects this theory, calling it vile. Rakitin believes humanity will find the strength to live for virtue in love for freedom, equality, and fraternity, despite lacking faith in the soul's immortality. This debate shows that Dostoevsky did not ignore various claims to supreme morality, limiting himself to one. However, the author disagrees with Rakitin's view, as evident, for example, in The Grand Inquisitor. Dostoevsky's works clearly express disbelief in abstractions like freedom, equality, and fraternity, on which Rakitin relies.

Rakitin calls Ivan, like his elder brother, a sensualist, believing his main goal is to steal Dmitry's fiancée with her dowry. He considers such people the most fatal, despite their outward nobility and selflessness. Rakitin describes Ivan's article on ecclesiastical courts as: "on the one hand, one cannot but admit, and on the other, one cannot but confess". Critics note that Rakitin himself exhibits Karamazov-like sensuality, explicitly highlighted by Dostoevsky even in his appearance: "And such vile sensual saliva on his lips...." In a conversation with Dmitry, Rakitin echoes Smerdyakov's words to Ivan: "A smart person can do anything, a smart person knows how to catch crayfish, but you ... you killed and got caught, and now you're rotting in prison!"

== Rakitin and Grushenka ==
Rakitin conceals that he is Grushenka Svetlova's cousin. At Grushenka's request, he brings Alyosha Karamazov to her but demands twenty-five rubles for the service. Previously, Rakitin visited Grushenka and begged for money, which she gave him despite despising him. Being crude in understanding others' feelings, Rakitin fails to grasp Grushenka's admiration for Alyosha and grows angry with her. On the way from Grushenka's, Rakitin tries to tell Alyosha vile things about her.

In that conversation, he sharply denies any kinship with Grushenka: "A relative? Is Grushenka my relative? — Rakitin suddenly shouted, turning red. — Are you out of your mind or what? Your brain's not right. <...> I can't be related to Grushenka, a public woman, please understand!" However, at the trial, Grushenka publicly states that Rakitin is her cousin and is ashamed of her. Rakitin turned crimson with shame at this revelation. Grushenka's testimony refutes Rakitin's claims and is deemed reliable within the novel's artistic system.

== Polemic against literary figures ==
"Let me to ask," began the counsel for the defense, with the most affable and even respectful smile, as he began his cross-examination, "you are, of course, the Mr. Rakitin who wrote that little brochure, published by the diocesan authorities, The Life of the deceased Elder Father Zossima, and which I had the pleasure of reading recently with such delight—full as it is of profound and religious reflections and containing that excellent and devout dedication to the bishop?"

"I did not write it for publication... it was published afterwards", mumbled Rakitin, almost disconcerted and with a shade of shame.

"Oh, that's excellent! A thinker like you can and indeed ought to look at every social phenomenon broadly. Thanks to the patronage of the bishop, your most useful pamphlet has been widely circulated and has had a salutary effect...."

The image of the seminarian-careerist Rakitin early in the novel established Dostoevsky's polemical stance against literary figures hostile to him. Critics believe that Rakitin's character was largely created as a caricature of the journalists Grigory Blagosvetlov and Grigory Eliseev, who worked with Mikhail Saltykov-Shchedrin, with whom Dostoevsky was far from friendly.

Confirming the polemical intent, in the drafts of A Writer's Diary, Dostoevsky wrote: "Man does not live by bread alone. That is, a person, if truly human, will not be satisfied even when fed, but feed a cow, and it will be content, just like Mr. Blagosvetlov and other liberals who have finally bought their own house with their liberalism.... This sated cow, content like Mr. Blagosvetlov, who has grown fat from his deeds and achieved his own house."

In a conversation with Alyosha, Rakitin relays Ivan's prediction for his future: "I'll go to St. Petersburg and join a thick journal, definitely in the criticism section.... I'll publish it again, certainly in a liberal and atheistic direction, with a socialist undertone.... The end of my career ... is that the socialist undertone won't prevent me from depositing subscription money into a current account and investing it when the opportunity arises." This prediction reflects facts from the distant past in Blagosvetlov and Eliseev's biographies. Eliseev also began as a seminarian but broke with the spiritual environment, moving to St. Petersburg and working first at Iskra and then at Sovremennik. The dialogue with the defense attorney about the authorship of Zosima's life also recalls a similar incident in Eliseev's biography.

== In the novel's poetics ==
Literary scholar Lev Reinus, who studied the history of Staraya Russa, noted that Dostoevsky's poetics often tie a character's surroundings to their personality, mood, and actions. After his conversation with Alyosha, Rakitin retreats into an alley. In Dostoevsky's symbolic language, an alley represents a false path, while the true path is a bright road. Thus, Rakitin's choice reflects an eternal ethical dilemma between these two paths. Alyosha Karamazov reflects: "Rakitin went into the alley. As long as Rakitin thinks of his grievances, he will always go into the alley.... But the road ... the road is wide, straight, bright, crystalline, and the sun is at its end...."

Philologist Lyubov Kuplevatskaya agrees with this assessment of Rakitin's choice, adding that in other mentions of alleys in the novel, they retain a real spatial meaning, but in Alyosha's speech about Rakitin's choice, the alley loses its realistic features and becomes an emblem. Its symbolic meaning is reinforced by its contrast with the road. Thus, the writer moves from allegory and emblem to a broad and multifaceted symbolic generalization.

Another symbol used by the writer is the "wall," representing hopelessness. According to Dostoevsky", staring at walls" signifies a spiritual dead-end. Dmitry Karamazov describes people like Rakitin: "Their souls are dry, flat, and dry, just like when I was approaching the prison and looking at the prison walls." The "crossroad" also stands out as a symbol of a moment of choice for a character in spatial terms. Besides Rakitin, Dmitry and Alyosha Karamazov also find themselves at a crossroad. While the Karamazov brothers move toward the "road" and "open space", Rakitin heads to the "alley," to a "stone house in St. Petersburg," where one can rent a "corner," another of Dostoevsky's symbols.

Philologist Valentina Vetlovskaya, noting that a character's words in a work may be perceived differently than the author intended, uses Rakitin and Grushenka to show how Dostoevsky guides readers to the correct interpretation through carefully chosen expressions. Rakitin denies being Grushenka's relative in a conversation with Alyosha: "Is Grushenka my relative? — Rakitin suddenly shouted, turning red. <...> I can't be related to Grushenka, a public woman.... Rakitin was in strong irritation." Grushenka, however, later confirms it: "He's my cousin. <...> He only begged me not to tell anyone here, he was so ashamed of me.... It was said that Rakitin turned crimson with shame in his chair." Rakitin's testimony stems from prejudice, as he is ashamed, making his arguments absurd. His dishonesty and insincerity throughout the novel further undermine his claims. Ultimately, Rakitin's testimony is discredited within the novel's artistic system.

The money Rakitin receives for bringing Alyosha to Grushenka alludes to the thirty pieces of silver. Rakitin, having received the money, tells Alyosha: "Now you're despising me for those twenty-five rubles? Sold a true friend, you say. But you're not Christ, and I'm not Judas". Dostoevsky deliberately avoids using the number thirty to prevent the parallel between Alyosha–Christ and Rakitin–Judas from being too overt. However, the number thirty appears in the novel when Grushenka says at the trial: "He kept coming to me to beg for money, sometimes thirty rubles a month." Thus, these regular thirty rubles, according to the critic, are meant to replace the incidental twenty-five he once received.

== Bibliography ==
- Altman, M. S. (1975). Достоевский. По вехам имен [Dostoevsky: By the Milestones of Names]. Saratov: Izdatelstvo Saratovskogo universiteta. p. 280.
- Bachinin, V. A. (2001). Достоевский: метафизика преступления (Художественная феноменология русского протомодерна) [Dostoevsky: Metaphysics of Crime (Artistic Phenomenology of Russian Protomodernism)]. Saint Petersburg: Izdatelstvo Sankt-Peterburgskogo universiteta. p. 412. ISBN 5-288-02838-9.
- Borshchevsky, Z. S. (1956). Щедрин и Достоевский [Shchedrin and Dostoevsky]. Saint Petersburg: Gosudarstvennoe izdatelstvo khudozhestvennoy literatury. p. 392.
- Vetlovskaya, V. E. (2007). Роман Ф. М. Достоевского «Братья Карамазовы» [F. M. Dostoevsky's Novel The Brothers Karamazov]. Saint Petersburg: Pushkinsky Dom. p. 640. ISBN 978-5-91476-001-1.
- Volgin, I. L. (1986). Последний год Достоевского. Исторические записки [Dostoevsky's Last Year: Historical Notes]. Moscow: Sovetsky pisatel. p. 576.
- Dolinin, A. S. (1963). Последние романы Достоевского. Как создавались «Подросток» и «Братья Карамазовы» [Dostoevsky's Last Novels: How The Adolescent and The Brothers Karamazov Were Created]. Moscow-Leningrad: Sovetsky pisatel. p. 343.
- Kantor, V. K. (1983). «Братья Карамазовы» Ф. Достоевского [F. Dostoevsky's The Brothers Karamazov]. Moscow: Khudozhestvennaya literatura. p. 192.
- Kantor, V. K. (2010). «Судить Божью тварь». Пророческий пафос Достоевского: Очерки ["To Judge God's Creature": Dostoevsky's Prophetic Pathos: Essays]. Moscow: Rossiyskaya politicheskaya entsiklopediya (ROSSPEN). p. 422. ISBN 978-5-8243-1345-1.
- Kudryavtsev, Yu. G. (1991). Три круга Достоевского [Three Circles of Dostoevsky]. Moscow: Izdatelstvo MGU. p. 400. ISBN 5-211-01121-X.
- Kuplevatskaya, L. A. (1992). "Символика хронотипа и духовное движение героев в романе «Братья Карамазовы»" [Symbolism of Chronotype and Spiritual Movement of Characters in the Novel The Brothers Karamazov]. In G. M. Fridlender (ed.). Достоевский. Материалы и исследования [Dostoevsky: Materials and Studies]. Vol. 10. Saint Petersburg: Nauka. pp. 90–101.
- Makarichev, F. V. (2010). "Феномен «хохлаковщины»" [The Phenomenon of Khokhlakovshchina]. In N. F. Budanova (ed.). Достоевский. Материалы и исследования [Dostoevsky: Materials and Studies]. Vol. 19. Saint Petersburg: Nauka. pp. 319–331.
- Meletinsky, E. M. (2001). Заметки о творчестве Достоевского [Notes on Dostoevsky's Work]. Moscow: Rossiysky gosudarstvenny gumanitarny universitet. p. 190.
- Mochulsky, K. V. (1980). Достоевский. Жизнь и творчество [Dostoevsky: Life and Work]. Paris: Ymca-press. p. 565.
- Nakamura, K. (2011). Словарь персонажей произведений Ф. М. Достоевского [Dictionary of Characters in F. M. Dostoevsky's Works]. Saint Petersburg: Giperion. p. 400. ISBN 978-5-89332-178-4.
- Reinus, L. M. (1991). "О пейзаже «Скотопригоньевска»" [On the Landscape of Skotoprigonyevsk]. In G. M. Fridlender (ed.). Достоевский. Материалы и исследования [Dostoevsky: Materials and Studies]. Vol. 9. Leningrad: Nauka. pp. 258–267.
- Scanlan, D. (2006). Достоевский как мыслитель [Dostoevsky as a Thinker]. Saint Petersburg: Akademichesky proekt. p. 256. ISBN 5-7331-0322-1.
- Syritsa, G. S. (2007). Поэтика портрета в романах Ф. М. Достоевского: Монография [Poetics of Portraiture in F. M. Dostoevsky's Novels: Monograph]. Moscow: Gnozis. p. 407. ISBN 978-5-94244-011-4.
- Syromyatnikov, O. I. (2014). Поэтика русской идеи в великом пятикнижии Ф. М. Достоевского: монография [Poetics of the Russian Idea in F. M. Dostoevsky's Great Pentateuch: Monograph]. Perm: Permsky gosudarstvenny natsionalny issledovatelsky universitet. p. 368. ISBN 978-5-91076-109-8.
- Tarasov, B. N. (2012). «Тайна человека» и тайна истории. Непрочитанный Чаадаев. Неопознанный Тютчев. Неуслышанный Достоевский ["The Mystery of Man" and the Mystery of History: Unread Chaadaev, Unrecognized Tyutchev, Unheard Dostoevsky]. Saint Petersburg: Aleteyya. p. 352. ISBN 978-5-91419-605-6.
- Tvardovskaya, V. A. (1996). "«Двух голосов перекличка»: Достоевский и Кропоткин в поисках общественного идеала" ["The Dialogue of Two Voices": Dostoevsky and Kropotkin in Search of a Social Ideal]. In G. M. Fridlender (ed.). Достоевский. Материалы и исследования [Dostoevsky: Materials and Studies]. Vol. 13. Saint Petersburg: Nauka. pp. 168–189.
- Fridlender, G. M. (1996). "Творческий процесс Достоевского" [Dostoevsky's Creative Process]. In G. M. Fridlender (ed.). Достоевский. Материалы и исследования [Dostoevsky: Materials and Studies]. Vol. 12. Saint Petersburg: Nauka. pp. 5–43.
- Chirkov, N. M. (1967). О стиле Достоевского. Проблематика, идеи, образы [On Dostoevsky's Style: Themes, Ideas, Images]. Moscow: Nauka. p. 305.
