= The Brothers Karamazov (1958 film) =

1958 film by Richard Brooks

- Theatrical release poster
- Directed by: Richard Brooks
- Written by: Richard Brooks; Julius J. Epstein; Philip G. Epstein
- Based on: The Brothers Karamazov; 1880 novel by Fyodor Dostoevsky
- Produced by: Pandro S. Berman
- Starring: Yul Brynner; Maria Schell; Claire Bloom; Lee J. Cobb; Albert Salmi; Richard Basehart; William Shatner
- Cinematography: John Alton
- Edited by: John Dunning
- Music by: Bronislau Kaper
- Production company: Avon Productions
- Distributed by: Metro-Goldwyn-Mayer
- Release date: 20 February 1958 (New York City premiere)
- Running time: 145 minutes
- Country: United States
- Language: English
- Budget: $2.7 million
- Box office: $5.4 million

The Brothers Karamazov is a 1958 American period drama film directed by Richard Brooks from a screenplay co-written with Julius and Philip Epstein, based on Fyodor Dostoevsky's 1880 novel. It stars Yul Brynner, Maria Schell, Claire Bloom, Lee J. Cobb, Albert Salmi, Richard Basehart, and William Shatner in his film debut.

The film was released by Metro-Goldwyn-Mayer on February 20, 1958. It received mixed-to-positive reviews from critics, though the performances were widely praised. It was nominated for the Palme d'Or at the 1958 Cannes Film Festival, and Lee J. Cobb received an nomination for the Academy Award for Best Supporting Actor for his performance as Fyodor Karamazov. The National Board of Review ranked The Brothers Karamazov as one of its Top 10 Films of 1958.

== Plot ==
In 1870 Russia, dissipated, unscrupulous Fyodor Karamazov manipulates three legitimate sons, army officer Dmitri; writer Ivan; and monk Alexey; as well as bastard son, Pavel Smerdyakov, a servant in Fyodor's home.

Financially irresponsible, Dmitri spends his inheritance from his mother on drinking, partying, and women. Before giving Dmitri money, Fyodor insists he sign a promissory note. Dmitri proceeds to drink and wreck a tavern in a brawl.

Dmitri's gallantry is idiosyncratic. A military commander's desperate daughter, Katya Ivanova, agrees to exchange sexual favors for five thousand rubles to replace the amount stolen from her father's charge. When Katya comes to comply, Dimitri sardonically proposes marriage; Katya declines the greater degradation. Giving Katya the money gratis, he sends her away.

After Dmitri is arrested for the tavern brawl, Katya visits him in military prison. Declaring her admiration, she takes charge. Her grandmother has given her a generous dowry, and Katya now accepts his half-serious proposal. Dmitry agrees to their betrothal but refuses to let Katya settle his debts. She bails Dmitri out of prison.

When Fyodor presses Dmitri to pay off his notes, Dmitri leaves town. During Dmitri's absence, Ivan visits Katya daily, discussing Dmitri; he becomes infatuated with her.

Meanwhile Fyodor targets beautiful, shrewd tavern owner Grushenka Svetlova, who refuses his advances. Plotting to acquire Dmitri's inheritance, Fyodor gives Grushenka Dmitri's notes to collect. Grushenka has her employee Snegiryov buy Dmitri's debts at fraction value, demanding repayment. When Dmitri defaults, Fyodor will keep Dmitri's inheritance legally. Dmitri confronts Snegiryov, humiliating the former army captain in front of young son Illusha. Katya asks Dmitri to mail her father a letter containing three thousand rubles, knowing Dimitri will keep the money.

Dmitri confronts Grushenka; strongly attracted, the two spend Katya's money on a binge. They start a passionate affair, he determines not to marry Katya, and Grushenka forgives his debts. His obsession turns into corrosive, possessive jealousy.

Dmitri asks Alexey to break his engagement to Katya. Alexey finds Grushenka with Katya, who believes Grushenka, tired of Dmitri's jealousy, wants to return to a Polish officer. Asserting she may not leave Dmitri, Grushenka departs.

Smerdyakov admires intellectual Ivan; both agree all behavior is permissible if God does not exist. Bragging to Ivan that he plans a confrontation between Fyodor and Dmitri, Smerdyakov believes Dmitri will kill Fyodor. Ivan decides to leave for Moscow; when Katya urges him to stay, Ivan resents being used while she is besotted with indifferent Dmitri. Smerdyakov arranges a rendezvous between Grushenka and the Polish officer. Mistakenly thinking Grushenka is with Fyodor, Dmitry confronts his father, but does not assault him, even when Fyodor attacks him.

Taking responsibility for his actions, Dmitri pawns his pistols, intending to give the money to Snegiryov as an apology for his insult. Indignant, Illusha convinces his father not to accept the apology or the money.

Confronting Grushenka, Dmitri finds a neglected Grushenka has realized the gambling-obsessed Polish officer only wants her money. Apologizing, Grushenka reconciles with Dmitri.

The police arrest Dmitri for Fyodor's murder. At trial, Dmitri pleads guilty to debauchery and debt but innocent of murder. The prosecutor accuses him of stealing three thousand rubles the night of Fyodor's murder. Katya testifies Dmitri took three thousand rubles from her, but she did not ask reimbursement. Expecting Dmitri to be found guilty, Ivan informs Katya he plans to smuggle Dmitri out of Russia.

At home, Ivan confronts Smerdyakov, who confesses to killing Fyodor and stealing three thousand rubles to implicate Dmitri, but insists Ivan was complicit when he went to Moscow knowing Smerdyakov's plot. Ivan denounces him to the police. Smerdyakov subsequently hangs himself.

At trial, Ivan testifies to Smerdyakov's confession. Vindictively, Katya produces Dmitri's letter claiming he will repay her money even if he must kill Fyodor to get it. Dmitri is found guilty. Later, Katya is disappointed when Dmitri is not among prisoners transported by train to prison camp. Ivan and Alexey arrange to get Dmitri and Grushenka out of Russia.

Detouring their escape route, Dmitri visits Snegiryov, finding Illusha gravely ill. Dmitri pretends to ask Snegiryov for forgiveness for fear of confronting the marksman in a duel. Illusha asks his father to spare Dmitri's life. Dmitri and Grushenka resume their escape.

== Cast ==
- Yul Brynner as Dmitri Fyodorovich Karamazov
- Maria Schell as Agrafena "Grushenka" Alexandrovna Svetlova
- Claire Bloom as Katerina "Katya" Ivanovna Verkhotseva
- Lee J. Cobb as Fyodor Pavlovich Karamazov
- Albert Salmi as Pavel Fyodrovich Smerdyakov
- William Shatner as Alexey "Alyosha" Fyodrovich Karamazov
- Richard Basehart as Ivan Fyodorovich Karamazov
- Judith Evelyn as Anna Hohlakov
- Edgar Stehli as Grigory Vasilievich Kutuzov
- Harry Townes as Ippoli Kirillov
- David Opatoshu as Captain Nikolai Ilyich Snegiryov
- Miko Oscard as Illusha Snegiryov
- Simon Oakland as Mavrayek
- William Vedder as Father Zossima
- Frank DeKova as Captain Vrublevsky
- Jay Adler as Pawnbroker
- Gage Clarke as Defense Counsel
- Ann Morrison as Marya
- Mel Welles as Trifon Borissovitch
- Friedrich von Ledebur as Chief Judge
- Ziva Rodann as Gypsy Singer
- Gloria Pall as Peasant Girl

== Production ==
=== Development and casting ===
Producer Eugene Frenke had been in talks with West German company Constantin Film to develop an adaptation of The Brothers Karamazov, with a screenplay by Niven Busch and Philip Yordan, and Joan Collins as Katya.

Marilyn Monroe was rumored to be in negotiations to play the role of Grushenka, but several conflicting accounts arose around the time the film entered production. An MGM executive said she'd turned down the role in part because she was expecting a baby, but Monroe's agent denied this and claimed that the studio had never even made her an offer. Richard Brooks said that Monroe would have made a "fine" Grushenka, but claimed that negotiations fell through "because of her contractual demands and personal troubles." Carroll Baker was the next choice for the role, but Warner Bros. put her on suspension and would not loan her out after she refused to play Diana Barrymore in Too Much, Too Soon. Maria Schell stepped in instead, making her American film debut. It was also the film debut for William Shatner, Albert Salmi and Simon Oakland.

=== Filming ===
The film was shot from June to August 1957. Richard Brooks had wanted to shoot on-location in Russia, but Cold War politics meant MGM insisted on recreating Russian locales at its studios in Culver City. Location filming also took place in London and Paris.

=== Changes from source material ===
Richard Brooks wrote the screenplay based on Constance Garnett's 1912 translation of the novel. In a 1957 interview, Brooks spoke about the challenges in adapting the expansive source material (with its heavy-use of flashbacks) into a feature film.

- The principal character of the novel is Alyosha (called by his proper name 'Alexey' in the film), whereas the film shifts focus to Dmitri. Brooks stated he felt Dmitri was a more action-oriented character and thus a more appropriate protagonist for a film.
- In the novel, Dmitri is indebted to Katerina, not his father Fyodor.
- In the novel, Katerina assists Dmitri in his escape for incarceration. In the film, Katerina submits evidence against Dmitri, thus securing his conviction, and the escape is masterminded by the other brothers.

== Release ==
The film had its premiere at Radio City Music Hall in New York on February 20, 1958. It opened at the Pantages Theatre in Los Angeles on February 26 and a day later at 3 theaters in Florida before expanding to 20 US cities in March.

== Reception ==
=== Box office ===
In its opening week at Radio City Music Hall it grossed $157,000. In its third week of release, the film reached number one at the U.S. box office. According to MGM records, the film made $2,390,000 in the U.S. and Canada and $3,050,000 in other markets, resulting in a profit of $441,000.

=== Critical response ===
Contemporary reviews were mixed to positive.

Bosley Crowther of The New York Times wrote "Except for a halfway happy ending that blunts the drama's irony, [Brooks] has done a good job of compressing the substance of the book...But most of all, Mr. Brooks and Mr. Berman have put upon the screen a large splash of vigorous drama and passion involving interesting, robust characters." Variety declared "Sumptuous and sensitive MGM production by Pandro S. Berman doesn't sacrifice art to entertainment nor lose entertainment in a false conception of what constitutes art. The Brothers Karamazov should be one of the year's commercial successes." Harrison's Reports wrote: "Excellent is the word for this absorbing and vigorous screen version of Fyodor Dostoyevsky's epic novel...The acting is superb, with brilliant performances turned in by Lee J. Cobb, as the lecherous and crafty father, and by Yul Brynner, as his fiery, quick-tempered eldest son." For the Los Angeles Times, Philip K. Scheuer called Brynner's performance "impressive" and wrote that Cobb as Fyodor Karamazov "succeeds in striking a recognizable and responsive chord with an audience," but found that Maria Schell's Grushenka was played "with a persisting Mona Lisa smile that I felt was not only foreign to the role of the materialistic, venal harlot but was also incomprehensibly at variance with her changing moods."

In more critical reviews, John McCarten of The New Yorker declared that the film "goes on for about two and a half hours, most of which you'd be better off spending at some more rewarding pursuit...I think that Mr. Brooks, in addition to being saddled with actors who just can't stand up to the obligations they've assumed, never quite grapples with the ideas that Dostoevski was trying to propound." The Monthly Film Bulletin wrote "There is none of Dostoievsky's profundity or exciting exploration of motive. All the brothers emerge as quite inexplicable people. It is hard to be sympathetic to Dmitri, and not to be embarrassed by Alyosha or scornful of Ivan. The performances throughout suggest that the cast never really knew what it was all about."

=== Awards and nominations ===
Award	Category	Nominee(s)	Result
Academy Award	Best Supporting Actor	Lee J. Cobb	Nominated
Cannes Film Festival	Palme d'Or	Richard Brooks	Nominated
Directors Guild of America Award	Outstanding Directorial Achievement in Motion Pictures	Richard Brooks	Nominated
Laurel Award	Top Male Dramatic Performance	Lee J. Cobb	Nominated
Laurel Award	Top Cinematography – Color	John Alton	Nominated
Laurel Award	Top Music Composer	Bronislau Kaper	Nominated
National Board of Review Award	Top Ten Films		8th Place
National Board of Review Award	Best Supporting Actor	Albert Salmi (also for The Bravados)	Won
New York Film Critics Circle Award	Best Director	Richard Brooks	Nominated

== See also ==
- List of American films of 1958
