= Lee J. Cobb =

American actor (1911–1976)

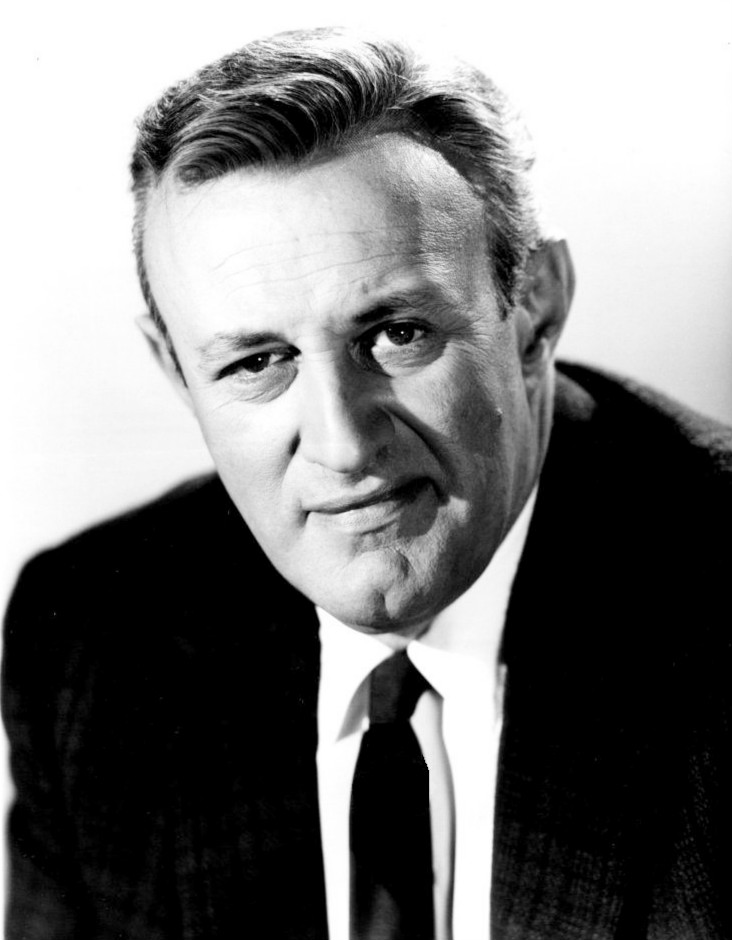
- Cobb c. 1960s
- Born: Leo Jacoby; December 8, 1911; New York City, U.S.
- Died: February 11, 1976 (aged 64); Los Angeles, California, U.S.
- Resting place: Mount Sinai Memorial Park Cemetery
- Education: New York University; Pasadena Playhouse
- Occupation: Actor
- Years active: 1934–1976
- Spouses: Helen Beverley (m. 1940; div. 1952) Mary Brako Hirsch (m. 1957)
- Children: 4, including Julie Cobb
- Awards: American Theater Hall of Fame
- Military career
- Allegiance: United States
- Branch: United States Army (Army Air Forces)
- Conflicts: World War II

Lee J. Cobb (born Leo Jacoby; December 8, 1911 – February 11, 1976) was an American actor, known both for film roles and his work on the Broadway stage, as well as for his starring role on the television series The Virginian. He often played arrogant, intimidating, and abrasive characters, but he also acted as respectable figures such as judges and police officers. He was nominated for two Academy Awards and two Golden Globe Awards, all in the Best Supporting Actor category.

Cobb was a member of the Group Theatre and originated the role of Willy Loman in Arthur Miller's 1949 play Death of a Salesman under the direction of Elia Kazan. He received his first Oscar nomination for playing Johnny Friendly in Kazan's On the Waterfront (1954). His subsequent film performances included Juror #3 in 12 Angry Men (1957), patriarch Fyodor Karamazov in The Brothers Karamazov (1958), Dock Tobin in Man of the West (also 1958), Barak Ben Canaan in Exodus (1960), Marshall Lou Ramsey in How the West Was Won (1962), Cramden in Our Man Flint (1966) and its sequel In Like Flint (1967), and Lt. William Kinderman in The Exorcist (1973).

On television, Cobb played a leading role in the first four seasons of the Western series, The Virginian as Judge Henry Garth and the ABC legal drama The Young Lawyers as David Barrett, and was nominated for Primetime Emmy Award for Outstanding Single Performance by an Actor three times. In 1981, Cobb was posthumously inducted into the American Theater Hall of Fame.

== Early life and education ==
Cobb was born in New York City, to a Jewish family of Russian and Romanian origin. He grew up in The Bronx, New York, on Wilkins Avenue, near Crotona Park. His parents were Benjamin (Benzion) Jacob, a compositor for The Jewish Daily Forward newspaper, and Kate (Neilecht), a homemaker.

Interested in acting from a young age, Cobb ran away from home at 16 to try to make it in Hollywood. He joined Borrah Minevitch's Harmonica Rascals as a musician and had a bit part in a short film featuring the group, but failed to find steady work and eventually moved back to New York.

Cobb studied accounting at New York University while working as a radio salesman. Still interested in show business, he went back to California and studied acting at the Pasadena Playhouse. He finally made his film debut at 23 in two episodes of the film serial The Vanishing Shadow (1934). He joined the Manhattan-based Group Theatre in 1935.

== Career ==
=== Stage ===
Cobb performed summer stock with the Group Theatre in 1936, when it summered at Pine Brook Country Club in Nichols, Connecticut. He made his Broadway debut as a saloonkeeper in a dramatization of Crime and Punishment that closed after 15 nights. He starred opposite Elia Kazan in Group Theatre's productions of Clifford Odets' Waiting for Lefty and Golden Boy. He also acted in Ernest Hemingway's only full-length play, The Fifth Column, and Odets' Clash by Night.

Cobb gained widespread recognition for his portrayal of Willy Loman in the original production of Arthur Miller's play Death of a Salesman under the direction of Elia Kazan. Miller praised Cobb as "the greatest dramatic actor I ever saw" and, upon his casting, changed a line referring to the physical appearance of the title character, whom the author had originally conceived of as a small man, from "shrimp" to "walrus". Cobb played through the play's entire initial run at the Morosco Theatre between February 1949 and November 1950. The play won the Tony Award for Best Play and the Pulitzer Prize for Drama. Miller later offered Cobb the part of Eddie Carbone in A View from the Bridge, but Cobb turned it down.

During World War II, Cobb joined the US Army Air Forces in the hopes of becoming a pilot. Instead, he was assigned to a radio unit. He was later transferred to the First Motion Picture Unit, where he appeared in Moss Hart Army Emergency Relief fundraiser productions like This is the Army and Winged Victory.

In 1968, his performance as King Lear with Stacy Keach as Edmund, René Auberjonois as the Fool, and Philip Bosco as Kent achieved the longest run (72 performances) for the play in Broadway history.

=== Film ===
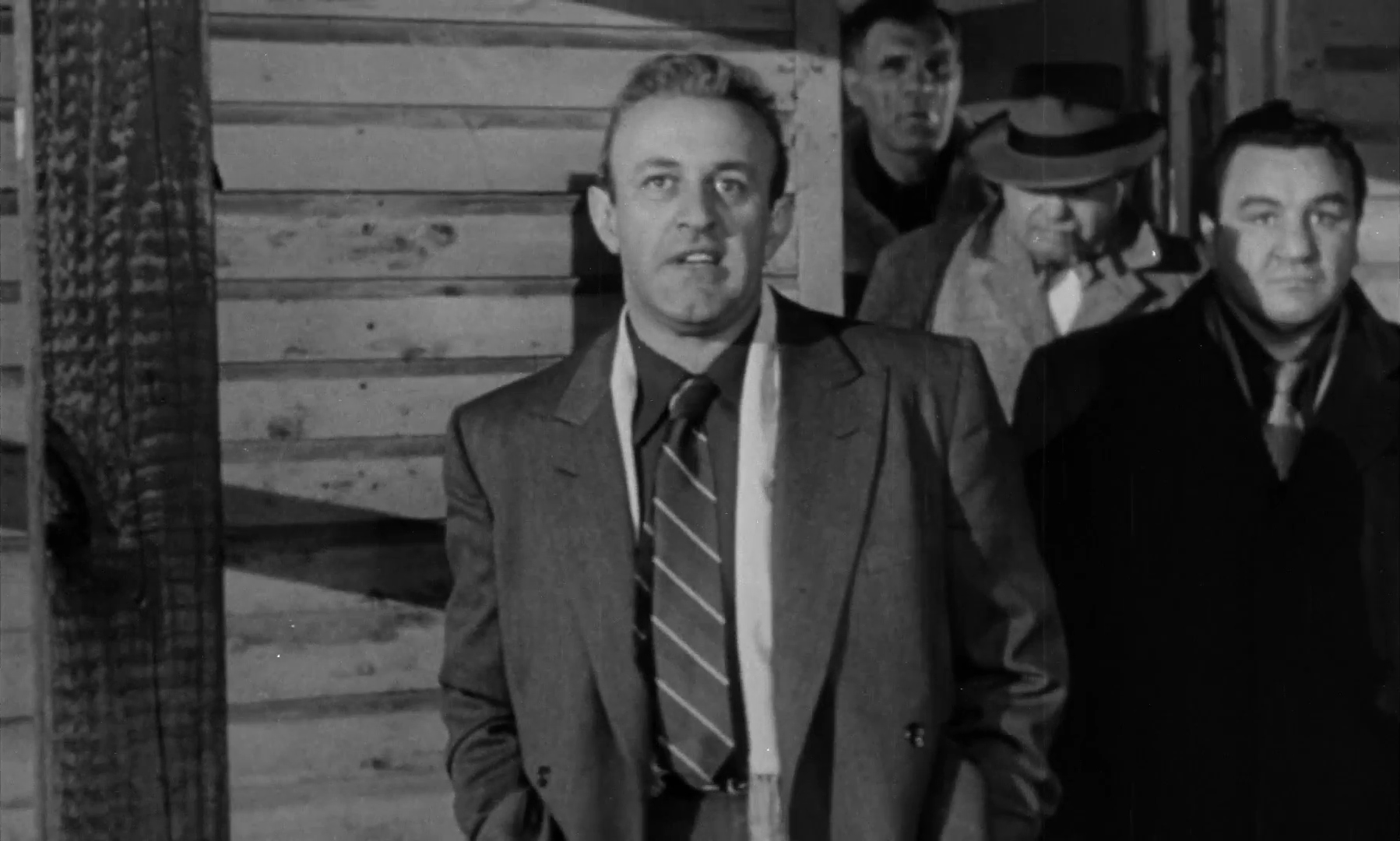
Cobb as Johnny Friendly in On the Waterfront (1954)

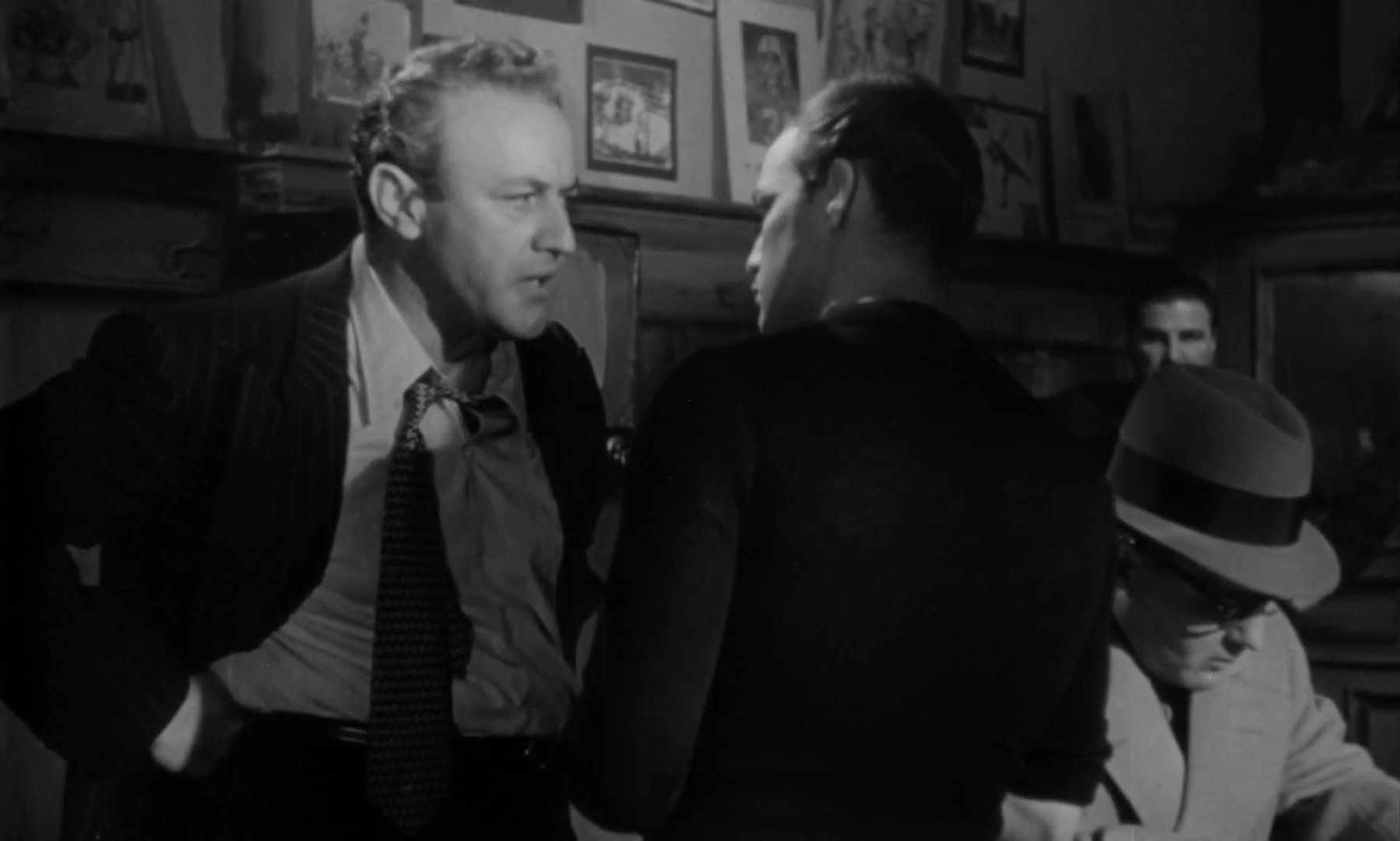
Cobb as Johnny Friendly with Marlon Brando as Terry Malloy in On the Waterfront (1954)

Cobb entered films in the 1930s, successfully playing middle-aged and even older characters while he was still a youth. His first credited role was in the 1937 Hopalong Cassidy oater Rustlers' Valley, where he was billed using the stage name 'Lee Colt.' In all subsequent films, he used Lee Cobb and later Lee J. Cobb.

He starred in the 1939 film adaptation of Golden Boy, albeit in a different role.

He was cast as the Kralahome in the 1946 film Anna and the King of Siam, upon which the musical play The King and I was later partially based. He also played the sympathetic doctor in The Song of Bernadette and appeared as Derek Flint's (James Coburn) supervisor in the James Bond spy spoofs Our Man Flint and In Like Flint.

In August 1955, while filming The Houston Story, Cobb suffered a heart attack and was replaced by Gene Barry. Later that year, he picked up a Best Supporting Actor Oscar nomination for his portrayal of corrupt union boss Johnny Friendly in Elia Kazan's On the Waterfront. He was nominated a second time for playing Fyodor in Richard Brooks' movie adaptation of The Brothers Karamazov.

In 1957, he appeared in Sidney Lumet's 12 Angry Men as the abrasive Juror #3. The role earned him a Golden Globe nomination for Best Supporting Actor, one of two in the same category. He was nominated again for the Frank Sinatra comedy Come Blow Your Horn (1963).

One of his final film roles was that of Washington, D.C. Metropolitan Police homicide detective Lt. Kinderman in the 1973 horror film The Exorcist, about a demonic possession of a teen-age girl (Linda Blair) in Georgetown, D. C. In the same decade, Cobb travelled to Europe to work in Italian films, primarily poliziotteschi (crime thrillers). His final films, Cross Shot and Nick the Sting, were both released posthumously, nearly two months after Cobb died.

=== Television ===
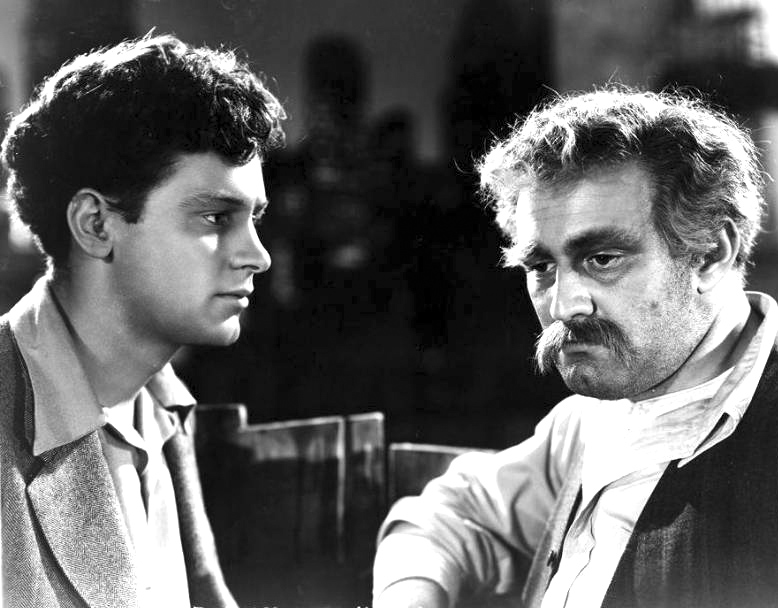
With William Holden in Golden Boy (1939)

In 1959, on CBS' DuPont Show of the Month, he starred in the dual roles of Miguel de Cervantes and Don Quixote in the play I, Don Quixote, which years later became the musical Man of La Mancha. Cobb also appeared as the Medicine Bow, Wyoming owner of the Shiloh Ranch, Judge Henry Garth in the first four seasons (1962–1966), of the long-running NBC Western television series The Virginian (1962–1971).

He reprised his role of Willy Loman in the 1966 CBS television adaptation of Death of a Salesman, which included Gene Wilder, James Farentino, Bernie Kopell, and George Segal. Cobb was nominated for an Emmy Award for the performance. Mildred Dunnock, who had co-starred in both the original stage version and the 1951 film version, again repeated her role as Linda, Willy's devoted wife.

One of his last television roles was as a stalwart overworked elderly physician still making house calls in urban Baltimore, in Doctor Max, a TV pilot for a potential series that never materialized. His final aired television role was Origins of the Mafia, a miniseries about the history of the Sicilian Mafia, filmed on-location in Italy. He subsequently appeared alongside British actor Kenneth Griffith in an ABC television documentary on the American Revolution called Suddenly an Eagle, which was broadcast six months after his death.

== Political activity ==
Cobb was accused of being a communist in 1951 testimony before the House Un-American Activities Committee (HUAC) by Larry Parks, an admitted former Communist Party member. Cobb was called to testify before HUAC but refused to do so for two years until his career was threatened by a potential Hollywood blacklist. He relented in 1953 and provided testimony, naming 20 people as former members of the Communist Party USA.

Later, Cobb explained why he offered the names, saying:

When the facilities of the government of the United States are drawn on an individual it can be terrifying. The blacklist is just the opening gambit—being deprived of work. Your passport is confiscated. That's minor. But not being able to move without being tailed is something else. After a certain point it grows to implied as well as articulated threats, and people succumb. My wife did, and she was institutionalized. The HUAC did a deal with me. I was pretty much worn down. I had no money. I couldn't borrow. I had the expenses of taking care of the children. Why am I subjecting my loved ones to this? If it's worth dying for, and I am just as idealistic as the next fellow. But I decided it wasn't worth dying for, and if this gesture was the way of getting out of the penitentiary I'd do it. I had to be employable again.

— Interview with Victor Navasky for the 1980 book Naming Names

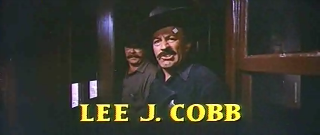
Cobb in the trailer for How the West Was Won (1962)

Following the hearing, Cobb resumed his career and worked with Elia Kazan and Budd Schulberg, two other HUAC friendly witnesses, on the 1954 film On the Waterfront.

== Personal life ==
Cobb married Yiddish theatre and film actress Helen Beverley in 1940. They had two children, actress Julie Cobb, and son Vincent Cobb, before divorcing in 1952. Cobb's second marriage was to school teacher Mary Hirsch (1929-1994), with whom he also had two children. Cobb supported Progressive Party candidate Henry A. Wallace in the 1948 United States presidential election.

== Death ==
Cobb died of a heart attack on February 11, 1976 in Woodland Hills, California at age 64, and was buried in Mount Sinai Memorial Park Cemetery in Los Angeles.

He was inducted into the American Theater Hall of Fame in 1981.

== Filmography ==
=== Film ===
Year	Title	Role	Director(s)	Notes
1937	North of the Rio Grande	Goodwin	Nate Watt	
1937	Rustlers' Valley	Cal Howard	Nate Watt	Credited as Lee Colt
1938	Danger on the Air	Tony Lisotti	Otis Garrett	
1939	Golden Boy	Mr. Bonaparte	Rouben Mamoulian	
1940	This Thing Called Love	Julio Diestro	Alexander Hall	
1941	Men of Boys Town	Dave Morris	Norman Taurog	
1941	Paris Calling	Captain Schwabe	Edwin L. Marin	
1943	The Moon Is Down	Dr. Albert Winter	Irving Pichel	
1943	Tonight We Raid Calais	M. Bonnard	John Brahm	
1943	Buckskin Frontier	Jeptha Marr	Lesley Selander	
1943	The Song of Bernadette	Dr. Dozous	Henry King	
1944	Winged Victory	Dr. Baker	George Cukor	
1946	Anna and the King of Siam	Kralahome	John Cromwell	
1947	Johnny O'Clock	Inspector Koch	Robert Rossen	
1947	Boomerang!	Chief Harold F. Robinson	Elia Kazan	
1947	Captain from Castile	Juan Garcia	Henry King	
1948	Call Northside 777	Brian Kelly	Henry Hathaway	
1948	The Miracle of the Bells	Marcus Harris	Irving Pichel	
1948	The Luck of the Irish	David C. Augur	Henry Koster	
1948	The Dark Past	Dr. Andrew Collins	Rudolph Maté	
1949	Thieves' Highway	Mike Figlia	Jules Dassin	
1950	The Man Who Cheated Himself	Lt. Edward Cullen	Felix E. Feist	
1951	Sirocco	Col. Feroud	Curtis Bernhardt	
1951	The Family Secret	Howard Clark	Henry Levin	
1952	The Fighter	Durango	Hebert Kline	
1953	The Tall Texan	Capt. Theodore Bess	Elmo Williams	
1954	Yankee Pasha	Sultan	Joseph Pevney	
1954	Day of Triumph	Zadok	John T. Coyle and Irving Pichel	
1954	Gorilla at Large	Detective Sgt. Garrison	Harmon Jones	
1954	On the Waterfront	Johnny Friendly	Elia Kazan	Nominated–Academy Award for Best Supporting Actor
1955	The Racers	Maglio	Henry Hathaway	
1955	The Road to Denver	Jim Donovan	Joseph Kane	
1955	The Left Hand of God	General Mieh Yang	Edward Dmytryk	
1956	The Man in the Gray Flannel Suit	Judge Bernstein	Nunnally Johnson	
1956	Miami Exposé	Lt. Bart Scott	Fred F. Sears	
1957	12 Angry Men	Juror #3	Sidney Lumet	Nominated–Golden Globe Award for Best Supporting Actor – Motion Picture
1957	The Garment Jungle	Walter Mitchell	Vincent Sherman	
1957	The Three Faces of Eve	Dr. Curtis Luther	Nunnally Johnson	
1958	The Brothers Karamazov	Fyodor Karamazov	Richard Brooks	Nominated–Academy Award for Best Supporting Actor
1958	Man of the West	Dock Tobin	Anthony Mann	
1958	Party Girl	Rico Angelo	Nicholas Ray	
1959	The Trap	Victor Massonetti	Norman Panama	
1959	Green Mansions	Nuflo	Mel Ferrer	
1959	But Not for Me	Jeremiah MacDonald	Walter Lang	
1960	Exodus	Barak Ben Canaan	Otto Preminger	
1962	Four Horsemen of the Apocalypse	Julio Madariaga	Vincente Minnelli	
1962	How the West Was Won	Marshall Lou Ramsey	John Ford, Henry Hathaway, and George Marshall	
1963	Come Blow Your Horn	Harry R. Baker	Bud Yorkin	Nominated–Golden Globe Award for Best Supporting Actor – Motion Picture
1966	Our Man Flint	Lloyd C. Cramden	Daniel Mann	
1967	In Like Flint	Lloyd C. Cramden	Gordon Douglas	
1968	The Day of the Owl	Don Mariano Arena	Damiano Damiani	
1968	Coogan's Bluff	Lt. McElroy	Don Siegel	
1968	They Came to Rob Las Vegas	Steve Skorsky	Antonio Isasi-Isasmendi	
1969	Mackenna's Gold	The Editor	J. Lee Thompson	
1970	The Liberation of L.B. Jones	Oman Hedgepath	William Wyler	
1970	Macho Callahan	Duffy	Bernard L. Kowalski	
1971	Lawman	Vincent Bronson	Michael Winner	
1973	The Man Who Loved Cat Dancing	Harvey Lapchance	Richard C. Sarafian	
1973	The Great Kidnapping	Iovine	Roberto Infascelli	
1973	The Exorcist	Lt. William Kinderman	William Friedkin	
1973	Ultimatum		Jean Pierre Lefebvre	
1974	The Balloon Vendor	Venti Anni	Mario Gariazzo	
1975	Mark of the Cop	Commander Benzi	Stelvio Massi	
1975	That Lucky Touch	Lt. Gen. Henry Steedman	Christopher Miles	
1975	Mark Shoots First	Commander Benzi	Stelvio Massi	
1976	Cross Shot	Dante Ragusa	Stelvio Massi	Released posthumously
1976	Nick the Sting	Robert Clark	Fernando Di Leo	Released posthumously

=== Television ===
Year	Title	Role	Notes
1951	Somerset Maugham TV Theatre	Charles Strickland	Episode: "The Moon and Sixpence"
1951	Tales of Tomorrow	Wayne Crowder	Episode: "Test Flight"
1951	Lights Out	David Stevenson	Episode: "The Veil"
1954	Ford Theatre	Matt Erwin	Episode: "Night Visitor"
1955	Lux Video Theatre	Émile Zola	Episode: "The Life of Emile Zola"
1955	Medic	Henry Fisher	Episode: "Break Through the Bars"
1955	Producers' Showcase	Rubashev	Episode: "Darkness at Noon"
1956	The Alcoa Hour	Zocco	Episode: "A Patch of Faith"
1956-58	Dick Powell's Zane Grey Theatre	Capt. Andrew Watling / Frank MacKinnon	Episode: "Death Watch" & "Legacy of a Legend"
1957	Studio One	Dr. Joseph Pearson	Episodes: "No Deadly Medicine: Parts 1 & 2"
1957-59	Playhouse 90	Al Bengsten / Dr. Lawrence Doner	Episodes: "Panic Button" & "Project Immortality"
1959	Westinghouse Desilu Playhouse	El Jefe	Episode: "Trial at Devil's Canyon"
1959-60	DuPont Show of the Month	Miguel de Cervantes / Dr. Hochberg	Episodes: "I, Don Quixote" & "Men in White"
1960-62	General Electric Theater	Dominic Roma / Grayson Foxhall	Episodes: "The Committeeman" & "The Unstoppable Gray Fox"
1961	DuPont Show with June Allyson	Capt. Maximillian Gault	Episode: "The School of the Soldier"
1961	Naked City	Paul Delito	Episode: "Take Off Your Hat When a Funeral Passes"
1961	Vincent Van Gogh: A Self-Portrait	Vincent van Gogh	Television film
1962-66	The Virginian	Judge Henry Garth	Main cast; Season 1-4
1963	Bob Hope Presents the Chrysler Theatre	Ernie Wigman	Episode: "It's Mental Work"
1966	Death of a Salesman	Willy Loman	Television film
1970-71	The Young Lawyers	David Barrett	Main cast
1972	Heat of Anger	Frank Galvin	Television film
1972	Double Indemnity	Barton Keyes	Television film
1972	McCloud	Alexander Montello	Episode: "Showdown at the End of the World"
1974	Trapped Beneath the Sea	Victor Bateman	Television film
1974	The Great Ice Rip-Off	Willy Calso	Television film
1974	Gunsmoke	Col. Josiah Johnson	Episode: "The Colonel"
1976	Origins of the Mafia	Bartolomeo Gramignano	Miniseries; 1 episode

== Stage roles ==
Run	Title	Role	Director	Original venue	Notes
01/22/35 - 02/06/35	Crime and Punishment	Koch the Saloonkeeper	Victor Wolfson	Biltmore Theatre	
03/26/35 - 07/13/35	Till the Day I Die	Detective Popper	Cheryl Crawford	Longacre Theatre	
03/26/35 - 07/13/35	Waiting for Lefty	Voice	Sanford Meisner	Longacre Theatre	
11/19/35 - 12/07/35	The Mother	Smilgin / Vasil Yefimovich / Policeman / Worker	Victor Wolfson	Civic Repertory Theater	
03/30/36 - 05/03/36	Bitter Stream	Don Circonstantza	Jacob Ben-Ami	Civic Repertory Theater	
11/19/36 - 01/16/37	Johnny Johnson	Dr. McBray / Brother George / French Major-General	Lee Strasberg	44th Street Theatre	
11/04/37 - 06/04/38	Golden Boy	Mr. Carp	Harold Clurman	Belasco Theatre	
01/05/39 - 05/06/39	The Gentle People: A Brooklyn Fable	Lammanawitz	Harold Clurman	Belasco Theatre	
11/14/39 - 12/02/39	Thunder Rock	Dr. Stefan Kurtz	Elia Kazan	Mansfield Theatre	
03/06/40 - 05/18/40	The Fifth Column	Max	Lee Strasberg	Alvin Theatre	
12/27/41 - 02/07/42	Clash by Night	Jerry Wilenski	Lee Strasberg	Belasco Theatre	
03/09/42 - 05/09/42	Jason	Jason Otis	Samson Raphaelson	Hudson Theatre	Replacement
11/20/43 - 05/20/44	Winged Victory	Dr. Baker	Moss Hart	44th Street Theatre & US tour	Produced by the U.S. Army Air Forces
02/10/49 - 11/18/50	Death of a Salesman	Willy Loman	Elia Kazan	Morosco Theatre	
03/12/52 - 04/06/52	Golden Boy	Mr. Bontaparte	Clifford Odets	ANTA Playhouse	
02/09/53 - 02/21/53	The Emperor's Clothes	Elek Odry	Harold Clurman	Ethel Barrymore Theatre	
11/07/68 - 02/12/69	King Lear	Lear	Gerald Freedman	Vivian Beaumont Theater	

== Radio appearances ==
Year	Program	Episode/source
1945	Suspense	"The Bet"
1946	Hollywood Star Time	The Song of Bernadette

== Accolades ==
Award	Year	Category	Nominated work	Result	Ref.
Academy Awards	1954	Best Supporting Actor	On the Waterfront	Nominated	
Academy Awards	1958	Best Supporting Actor	The Brothers Karamazov	Nominated	
Golden Globe Awards	1957	Best Supporting Actor – Motion Picture	12 Angry Men	Nominated	
Golden Globe Awards	1963	Best Supporting Actor – Motion Picture	Come Blow Your Horn	Nominated	
Grammy Awards	1967	Best Spoken Word, Documentary or Drama Recording	Death of a Salesman	Nominated	
Laurel Awards	1954	Top Male Character Performance	On the Waterfront	Won	
Laurel Awards	1958	Top Male Dramatic Performance	The Brothers Karamazov	Nominated	
Laurel Awards	1960	Top Male Supporting Performance	Exodus	4th Place	
Laurel Awards	1963	Top Male Supporting Performance	Come Blow Your Horn	Nominated	
Primetime Emmy Awards	1958	Actor – Best Single Performance – Lead or Support	Studio One (Episode: "No Deadly Medicine")	Nominated	
Primetime Emmy Awards	1960	Outstanding Single Performance by an Actor (Lead or Support)	Playhouse 90 (Episode: "Project Immortality")	Nominated	
Primetime Emmy Awards	1967	Outstanding Single Performance by an Actor in a Leading Role in a Drama	Death of a Salesman	Nominated	
Western Heritage Awards	1966	Fictional Television Drama	The Virginian (Episode: "The Horse Fighter")	Won	

=== Honors ===
- 1966: Golden Plate Award of the American Academy of Achievement
- 1981: American Theatre Hall of Fame

== See also ==
- McCarthyism
- Second Red Scare
