= Lise Khokhlakov =

Character in "The Brothers Karamazov"

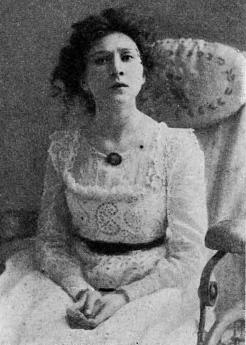
- Lisa Khokhlakova portrayed by actress MXAT Lydia Koreneva
- First appearance: The Brothers Karamazov
- Created by: Fyodor Dostoevsky
- Based on: Valentina Khokhryakova

In-universe information
- Gender: Female
- Family: Ekaterina Osipovna Khokhlakov (mother)
- Nationality: Russia

Lise Khokhlakov is a character in the novel The Brothers Karamazov by the 19th-century Russian writer Fyodor Dostoevsky, a fourteen-year-old girl suffering from leg paralysis with a charming face. She is the daughter of the landowner Ekaterina Osipovna Khokhlakov. She first appears in the novel in the chapter A Lady of Little Faith, during a visit with her mother to the monastery of Father Zosima. Known to Alyosha Karamazov since early childhood, she writes him a love letter and is considered his fiancée, but as the plot develops, she falls in love with Ivan Karamazov.

In the novel, Lise appears only in episodes related to Alyosha Karamazov, serving to clarify and enhance his character. She is characterized by the charm of childhood, spontaneity, and a certain naivety; at the same time, she can be harsh and determined, with her enthusiasm sometimes bordering on exaltation. According to Dostoevsky's design, Lise's feelings for Alyosha were meant to oscillate between friendship and love, remaining (on her part) within the bounds of friendship. Simultaneously, she is drawn to the complexity, mystery, and inner contradictions characteristic of Ivan. The conversation between Alyosha and Lise in the chapter A Little Demon was noted by critics as the most significant fragment in shaping Alyosha's inner portrait. In that same conversation, Lise herself undergoes a transformation, finally achieving some clarity in her existence and inner resolve.

The prototype for Lise Khokhlakov was Valentina, the daughter of Lyudmila Khokhryakova, who in turn served as the prototype for Ekaterina Osipovna Khokhlakov.

== First appearance ==
“Why do you, you naughty girl, keep teasing him like that?”

Suddenly, quite unexpectedly, Lise blushed, her eyes flashed, her face became terribly serious, and with a heated, indignant complaint she began speaking quickly, nervously:

“And why has he forgotten everything? He used to carry me in his arms when I was little, we used to play together. He even came to teach me to read, do you know that? Two years ago, when he was leaving, he said he would never forget, that we were eternal friends, eternal, eternal! And now he’s suddenly afraid of me—am I going to eat him or what? Why doesn’t he want to come near me, why doesn’t he talk? Why doesn’t he come to our house? Or is it you who won’t let him: we know he goes everywhere else. It’s not proper for me to invite him, he should be the first to remember, if he hasn’t forgotten. No, sir, now he’s saving his soul! Why did you put that long cassock on him … If he runs, he’ll fall …”

And suddenly, unable to restrain herself, she covered her face with her hand and burst into a terrible, uncontrollable, long, nervous, shaking, silent laugh.

— Dialogue between Lisa and Zosima about Alyosha at the monastery

Lise Khokhlakov first appears in the chapter A Lady of Little Faith, where she, along with her mother, visits the monastery of Father Zosima and speaks with him and Alyosha Karamazov. At this time, she is a sickly fourteen-year-old girl "with a charming little face, thin but cheerful" and "something mischievous" in her eyes. Lise has known Alyosha since early childhood, but it has been some time since they last met. The complexity of her relationship with Alyosha becomes immediately apparent, as she has been preoccupied with thoughts of him since arriving in Skotoprigonyevsk. Dostoevsky repeatedly notes that Lise sometimes expresses her feelings with heightened emotionality, which raises doubts in the reader about whether Zosima truly healed the girl. In this scene, a conflict of interests emerges, as Alyosha's attachment to Lise clashes with his spiritual goals at the monastery. Lise laughs at Alyosha's monastic attire, blushing under her persistent and spirited gaze, attracting comment from Zosima. Lise complains to Zosima that, by entering the monastery, Alyosha has completely forgotten her. Seeing Lise's undisguised feelings for Karamazov, the elder resolves to send Alyosha to her.

== Name ==
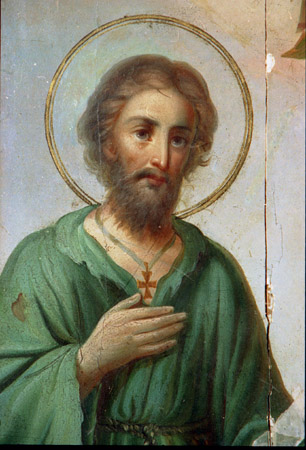
Alexius, Man of God. Icon

Critics have noted the deliberate choice of the heroine's name and surname by Dostoevsky. As philologist Moisei Altman observed, the surname Khokhlakov is a modified version of the prototype's surname, Valentina Khokhryakova. According to philologist Valentina Vetlovskaya, the choice of the name was influenced by the portrayal of the heroine in the novel as Alyosha Karamazov's future fiancée. Although the name of the fiancée of Saint Alexius, Man of God, with whom the youngest Karamazov is associated in the novel, is not mentioned in Russian versions of his hagiography, some variants of spiritual verse refer to her as Katerina or Lizaveta. The name Lizaveta first appears in the novel in the chapter Believing Women, when one of the women, in response to Zosima's question about her child, says: "A girl, my light, Lizaveta". In the same chapter, Alexius, Man of God, is also first mentioned.

The theory about the origin of the heroine's name is further confirmed in the chapter A Lady of Little Faith, where a conversation takes place between Lise, her mother, the landowner Khokhlakov, Alyosha Karamazov, and his spiritual father, Father Zosima. Vetlovskaya notes that this episode clearly suggests a connection between Alyosha and Alexius, Man of God, and between Lise and Lizaveta, the saint's fiancée and wife, with the elder's promise to send Alyosha appearing as a preliminary arrangement by the parents. This assumption is supported by Alyosha himself, who plans to marry Lise after leaving the monastery.

== Character ==
Lise is a rather peculiar character. In the novel, she appears only in episodes related to Alyosha Karamazov, with the purpose of making his character clearer and more understandable. In one scene, Alyosha directly tells her: "You know, Lise, my elder once said: you have to look after people as if they were children, and some as if they were sick in hospitals…" Although this remark was not directed specifically at the girl, it largely applies to Lise, who becomes a symbolic object of Alyosha's active love. Combining the traits of a child and a sick person, Lise is one of the most challenging individuals in Alyosha's circle. Nevertheless, despite all the difficulties, Alyosha's love for her remains steadfast. The heroine's psychological portrait blends simplicity and malice (evident, for instance, in her laughter); she is also characterized by extreme emotional openness and vulnerability. While childishly charming, she possesses a strong will. The girl is aware that she is sometimes consumed by dark thoughts. At such moments, new notes appear in her voice — from ecstatic shrieks to grating tones. Her vocal changes betrays her emotional turmoil and confusion. Evidence of the heroine's dual nature is her occasional contempt for those around her, coupled with her simultaneous dependence on them.

In Lise's soul, as in the souls of other characters in The Brothers Karamazov, there is a continuous struggle between good and evil. At the same time, Lise tends to mistake evil for good. She can simultaneously dream of helping the unfortunate and wish to be tormented; her dream of pineapple compote is associated in her mind with the image of a boy with severed fingers. Much of Lise Khokhlakov's psychological turmoil stems from her young age, and her hysterical love dialectic parallels the turmoil of Katerina Ivanovna Verkhovtseva, another female character in the novel. For instance, in the scene "At the Khokhlakov's", Lise is capricious and demands that Alyosha return her love letter. At the same time, Katerina Ivanovna cannot decide between her love for Ivan Karamazov and her proud attachment to Dmitry Karamazov reacting indignantly to Alyosha's exposure of her feelings.

Despite her written confession of love to Alyosha, Lise experiences complex emotional feelings toward Ivan Karamazov as well. Lise urges both brothers to confirm that she sees no difference between good and evil and that she is already possessed by demons. Ivan's response is ironic and leads to Lise's contempt. Alyosha, however, considers her conclusion sinful but refuses to follow her lead or despise her for her perverse tendencies.

=== Relationship with Alyosha ===
Lise has known Alyosha since early childhood. According to literary critic Akim Volynsky, Dostoevsky intended to portray Lise's relationship with Alyosha as oscillating between friendship and love, while hinting at only a friendly perspective from the heroine's side. In the monastery, Alyosha seems comical to her in his cassock and simultaneously elevated, which hinders love. Yet, in her interactions with Alyosha, her spiritual side is revealed for the first time. In her letter during their first meeting at the monastery, she writes: "Dear Alyosha, I love you, I've loved you since childhood, from Moscow, when you were completely different from now, and I love you for my whole life. I've chosen you with my heart to unite with you, and in old age to end our lives together". Lise's letter inspires Alyosha, sparking fantasies in his mind about a future marriage, and he believes she would make a worthy wife. However, dreams of possible happiness prove unattainable, and unfulfilled hopes lead to disappointment. In their subsequent conversation, the friendly nature of their relationship is definitively established.

But Lise cannot imagine him as a husband. In response to Alyosha's serious intention to marry her in the future, the girl only laughs. Turning to the landowner Khokhlakov, she calls him a little boy, doubting that Alyosha should marry just because he imagines it's necessary. At the same time, Lise increasingly respects Alyosha for his seriousness, which also hinders the development of love. In their final meeting, the girl directly tells Alyosha that, due to his character, he is entirely unsuitable as a husband: "You're not fit to be a husband; I'd marry you, and suddenly I'd give you a note to deliver to the one I love after you. You'd take it and certainly deliver it, and even bring back a reply. And when you're forty, you'll still be carrying my notes like that". In this scene, the heroine's emotional turmoil is also evident, as she simultaneously pursues the practical goal of passing a letter to Ivan Karamazov.

In her relationship with Alyosha, Lise's desire to cause suffering to those around her also manifests. Her tormenting relationships with everyone, evident even in moments like beating a maid, are particularly pronounced with Alyosha, in her repulsive self-exposures and hints at her relationship with Ivan. However, after Alyosha's departure, her inner sadism turns against herself, resulting in Lise pinching her own finger. Critics have noted that Dostoevsky used this to emphasize that Lise is now entirely captive to an unclean force, as a person who has sentenced herself without the possibility of reprieve: "Because I don't love anyone. Do you hear, no one!" According to Father Zosima, such people, incapable of love, are doomed to hellish torments.

=== Relationship with Ivan ===
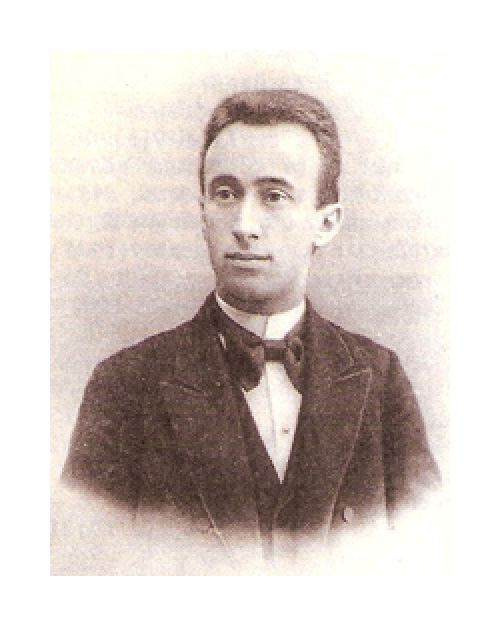
Literary critic Akim Volynsky

Choosing between the two brothers, Lise realizes that she does not feel true attraction to Alyosha; her feeling toward him is akin to deification, her admiration and reverence being more otherworldly. Alyosha is almost ideal in her eyes, and thus beautiful and distant, like an unattainable dream. However, beside him is another Karamazov — his elder brother Ivan Karamazov. His complexity, mystery, and inner contradictions increasingly attract Lise. Despite declaring in a conversation with Alyosha, "I don't love your brother, Ivan Fyodorovich," Alyosha begins to sense Ivan's influence over Lise in this denial.

Ivan Karamazov visits Lise at her invitation, and Alyosha realizes that his brother has a significant influence on the girl: after their interactions, her speech incorporates his words and expressions, and the ideas Ivan professes are processed by her morbid imagination. Lise's irritation is partly caused by the shame she feels about her letter to Ivan, which he received rather coldly. In the scene of Alyosha's final meeting with Lise, the younger Karamazov notes the consequences of Ivan's ideas on her. Lise no longer wants to be happy; her thoughts are drawn to crimes. Alyosha understands that Ivan influences her, awakening in her what has not yet had the chance to emerge on its own.

Critics have also noted that Lise's hysterical rebellion, during which she turns away from divine harmony, parallels Ivan Karamazov's rebellion, which is why he implicitly approves of her story about pineapple compote. Alyosha adds that Ivan himself might believe Lise. Lise's rebellion complements Ivan's, though it naturally falls short in scope due to the heroine's youth. Critics have noted that such parallels are a crucial artistic device in Dostoevsky's work. At the same time, Lise's character in the novel, through her self-exposures and propositions, seeks to dismantle Ivan's idea of children's innocence, as crimes of children against children are no less horrific than those of adults against children.

=== A Little Demon ===
"…sometimes in my dreams I see devils. It’s as if it’s night, I’m in my room with a candle, and suddenly there are devils everywhere, in all the corners, under the table, and they open the door, and there’s a crowd of them outside, and they want to come in and grab me. And they’re already coming, already grabbing. But I suddenly make the sign of the cross, and they all draw back, they’re afraid, only they don’t go away completely, they stand by the door and in the corners, waiting. And suddenly I get a terrible urge to start reviling God out loud, and so I start reviling Him, and they suddenly rush at me again in a crowd, so delighted, and they’re already grabbing me again, but I suddenly make the sign of the cross again—and they all draw back. It’s terribly fun, it takes my breath away".

— Lisa’s dream

Lise Khokhlakov's conversation with Alyosha in the chapter "A Little Demon" is pivotal in shaping Alyosha's psychological portrait and illustrating Dostoevsky's dialectical model of the human soul. Initially depicted as a paralyzed child who uses a wheelchair, Lise's recovery and rise from the chair symbolize her inner transformation and newfound resolve. Her character embodies a complex mix of simplicity and malice, modesty and shamelessness, reflecting a "nocturnal soul" akin to Dostoevsky's Underground Man. Her confessions reveal a fascination with self-destruction and evil, highlighting her internal conflict and the broader human struggle with dark impulses.

Lise's confessions, particularly her dream of devils and the pineapple compote story, expose her morbid desires and the interplay of good and evil within her. She oscillates between reverence for God and provocation of demons, a state described by Michel Foucault as "the nothingness of unreason." Her fixation on evil, including fantasies of committing crimes like parricide, reflects Dostoevsky's concept of the human soul's negative aspect as a destructive "nothingness." Alyosha recognizes her inner disorder, possibly linked to her past illness, and their shared dream underscores their spiritual kinship, revealing Alyosha's own internal struggle between divine and demonic forces.

"Here’s one little story I read somewhere, about a trial. A Jew was accused of taking a four-year-old Christian boy, cutting off all the fingers on both his hands, and then crucifying him on the wall, hammering nails through him and crucifying him. And then at the trial he said the boy died quickly, in four hours. Quickly, he says! He kept moaning, kept on moaning, and that one stood there gazing at him. That’s nice! … Sometimes I imagine it was me who crucified him. He hangs there moaning, and I sit down facing him, eating pineapple compote. I love pineapple compote".

— The pineapple compote story

Lise's confessions, particularly the pineapple compote story, reveal her demonic self-awareness and attraction to perverse fantasies, influenced by antisemitic blood libel narratives. Her simultaneous enjoyment and distress over these thoughts encapsulate a moral antinomy, combining evil, empathy, and detachment. This reflects Dostoevsky's exploration of a morally indifferent world where sadistic cruelty thrives, echoing Ivan Karamazov's notion that "everything is permitted". Lise's struggle with self-hatred and spiritual emptiness underscores the demonic as an inescapable force, linking to themes in The Grand Inquisitor and deepening the understanding of human nature's darker aspects.

== The novel's artistic techniques ==
Dostoevsky employs inserted texts, such as letters and notes, to shape the narrative in The Brothers Karamazov, with Alyosha Karamazov as their focal point. Lise Khokhlakov’s love letter to Alyosha, urging him to visit, exemplifies this technique, creating chronological and thematic distance through interspersed unrelated events, like meetings and prayers. The letter’s delivery, reading, and discussion are separated by scenes that emphasize randomness and delay, serving a "retarding function" that alters the narrative’s progression and highlights the contrast between spiritual and romantic contexts.

Dostoevsky uses the technique of one character echoing another’s thoughts to underscore key ideas, particularly through Lise Khokhlakov reinforcing her mother Ekaterina’s admiration of Alyosha’s "angelic" nature. After Ekaterina praises Alyosha’s actions as angelic, Lise’s questions —"Why did he act like an angel?"— draw further attention to this quality, ensuring the theme’s prominence. This method emphasizes Alyosha’s moral essence and strengthens the novel’s exploration of virtue through character interactions.

Dostoevsky’s artistic techniques include recurring linguistic and symbolic elements, such as "black eyes," "distorted," "fire," and "little demon," which carry mythological and semantic weight. Lise Khokhlakov’s portrait features dark eyes and fiery expressions, symbolizing passion and turmoil, while "distorted" reflects spiritual ugliness. The term "little demon," used by Ivan for both Lise and Alyosha, ties to the semantic field of "devil" and "disorder," the latter expressed in Lise’s desire for chaos. The word "secret" in her hidden love letter adds intrigue, while prayers, like Lise’s to the Virgin, underscore the novel’s spiritual dimension.

== Prototype ==
Philologist Moisei Altman suggests that the prototype for Lise Khokhlakov was Valentina, the daughter of Lyudmila Khristoforovna Khokhryakova, née Rabinder, who in turn served as the prototype for Lise's mother, Ekaterina Osipovna Khokhlakov. By the time she met Dostoevsky in 1876, Lyudmila Khokhryakova had been married twice, lost her second husband, and was living with her daughter. She worked at a telegraph station and contributed to minor periodicals.

Lise's age matches Valentina's at the time the novel was written. Both girls live with their widowed mothers. The episode of Khokhlakov and her daughter visiting Father Zosima in the novel is also based on real events. Khokhryakova reported that in 1876, she visited Abbess Mitrofania with her daughter. Furthermore, according to the writer's wife, Anna Grigoryevna, a story that appeared in A Writer's Diary about a twelve-year-old girl who ran away from her mother, deciding not to attend school anymore, was written by Dostoevsky based on a real incident involving Valentina, which Mrs. Khokhryakova shared with the writer. Dostoevsky commented on the girl's actions as follows: "Of course, they'll object immediately: ‘A single case, and simply because the girl is very foolish.' But I know for certain that the girl is far from foolish. And above all, this is not at all a single case".

According to Vladislav Bachinin, one of the prototypes for Lise's confession may have been the confessions of Clairwil, a character in the novel Juliette by Marquis de Sade: "How I wish," she says, "to find a crime whose effect would not cease even when I can no longer act, so that there would not be a single moment in my life, even in sleep, when I am not the cause of some corruption, and that this corruption would spread and spread, leading to universal depravity, to such terrible chaos that its consequences would persist beyond my life".

== Bibliography ==
=== In Russian language ===
- Altman, M. S. (1975). Достоевский. По вехам имен [Dostoevsky: By the Milestones of Names]. Saratov: Saratov University Press. p. 280.
- Bachinin, V. A. (2001). Достоевский: метафизика преступления (Художественная феноменология русского протомодерна) [Dostoevsky: Metaphysics of Crime (Artistic Phenomenology of Russian Protomodernism)]. Saint Petersburg: Saint Petersburg University Press. p. 412. ISBN 5-288-02838-9.
- Vetlovskaya, V. E. (2007). Роман Ф. М. Достоевского «Братья Карамазовы» [F. M. Dostoevsky’s Novel “The Brothers Karamazov”]. Saint Petersburg: Pushkin House. p. 640. ISBN 978-5-91476-001-1.
- Volkova, T. N. (2010). "Вставной текст: композиционные и сюжетные функции («Братья Карамазовы» Ф. М. Достоевского и «Воскресение» Л. Н. Толстого)" [Inserted Text: Compositional and Plot Functions (“The Brothers Karamazov” by F. M. Dostoevsky and “Resurrection” by L. N. Tolstoy)]. New Philological Bulletin. 12 (1). Moscow: Ippolitov Publishing: 33–42.
- Volynsky, A. L. (2011). Достоевский: философско-религиозные очерки [Dostoevsky: Philosophical-Religious Essays]. Saint Petersburg: Leonardo Publishing House. p. 672. ISBN 978-5-91962-011-2.
- Garicheva, E. A. (2007). "Тема безумия в творчестве Достоевского и Полонского" [The Theme of Madness in the Works of Dostoevsky and Polonsky]. In Budanova, N. F.; Yakubovich, I. D. (eds.). Достоевский. Материалы и исследования [Dostoevsky: Materials and Studies] (in Russian). Vol. 18. Saint Petersburg: Nauka. pp. 144–167.
- Golosovker, Ya. E. (1963). Достоевский и Кант [Dostoevsky and Kant]. Moscow: USSR Academy of Sciences Publishing. p. 103.
- Evlampev, I. I. (2012). Философия человека в творчестве Ф. Достоевского (от ранних произведений к «Братьям Карамазовым») [Philosophy of Man in the Works of F. Dostoevsky (From Early Works to “The Brothers Karamazov”)]. Saint Petersburg: Russian Christian Humanitarian Academy Publishing. p. 585. ISBN 978-5-88812-548-9.
- Kantor, V. K. (2010). «Судить Божью тварь». Пророческий пафос Достоевского: Очерки [“To Judge God’s Creature”: The Prophetic Pathos of Dostoevsky: Essays]. Moscow: Russian Political Encyclopedia (ROSSPEN). p. 422. ISBN 978-5-8243-1345-1.
- Meletinsky, E. M. (2001). Заметки о творчестве Достоевского [Notes on Dostoevsky’s Work]. Moscow: Russian State Humanitarian University. p. 190.
- Pis, R. (2007). "Правосудие и наказание: «Братья Карамазовы»" [Justice and Punishment: “The Brothers Karamazov”]. In Kasatkina, T. A. (ed.). Роман Ф. М. Достоевского «Братья Карамазовы»: современное состояние изучения [F. M. Dostoevsky’s Novel “The Brothers Karamazov”: Current State of Study]. Moscow: Nauka. pp. 10–39.
- Rosenblum, L. M. (1981). Творческие дневники Достоевского [Dostoevsky’s Creative Diaries]. Moscow: Nauka. p. 368.
- Syritsa, G. S. (2007). Поэтика портрета в романах Ф. М. Достоевского: Монография [Poetics of the Portrait in F. M. Dostoevsky’s Novels: Monograph]. Moscow: Gnosis. p. 407. ISBN 978-5-94244-011-4.
- Williams, R. (2013). Достоевский: язык, вера, повествование [Dostoevsky: Language, Faith, Narrative]. Moscow: Russian Political Encyclopedia (ROSSPEN). p. 295. ISBN 978-5-8243-1556-1.
- Chizhevsky, D. I. (2010). "Шиллер и «Братья Карамазовы»" [Schiller and “The Brothers Karamazov”]. In Budanova, N. F. (ed.). Достоевский. Материалы и исследования [Dostoevsky: Materials and Studies] (in Russian). Vol. 19. Saint Petersburg: Nauka. pp. 144–167.
- Chirkov, N. M. (1967). О стиле Достоевского. Проблематика, идеи, образы [On Dostoevsky’s Style: Themes, Ideas, Images]. Moscow: Nauka. p. 305.
- Fridlender, G. M. (1976). Ф. М. Достоевский. Полное собрание сочинений в тридцати томах [F. M. Dostoevsky: Complete Works in Thirty Volumes]. Vol. 14. Leningrad: Nauka. p. 624.

=== Further reading ===
- Bakhtin, Mikhail (1984). Problems of Dostoevsky's Poetics. Translated by Caryl Emerson. University Of Minnesota Press. ISBN 9780816612277.
- Frank, Joseph (2010). Dostoevsky A Writer in his Time. Princeton University Press. ISBN 9780691128191.
- Jones, Malcolm V.; Terry, Garth M. (1983). New Essays on Dostoyevsky. Cambridge University Press. ISBN 978-0-521-15531-1.
- Rosen, Nathan (2002). "The Madness of Lise Khokhlakov". Dostoevsky Studies: 154–162.
- Terras, Victor (2002) [1981]. A Karamazov Companion. University of Wisconsin Press. ISBN 0-299-08310-1.
