= The Grand Inquisitor =

Story within a story by Dostoevsky

- by Fyodor Dostoevsky
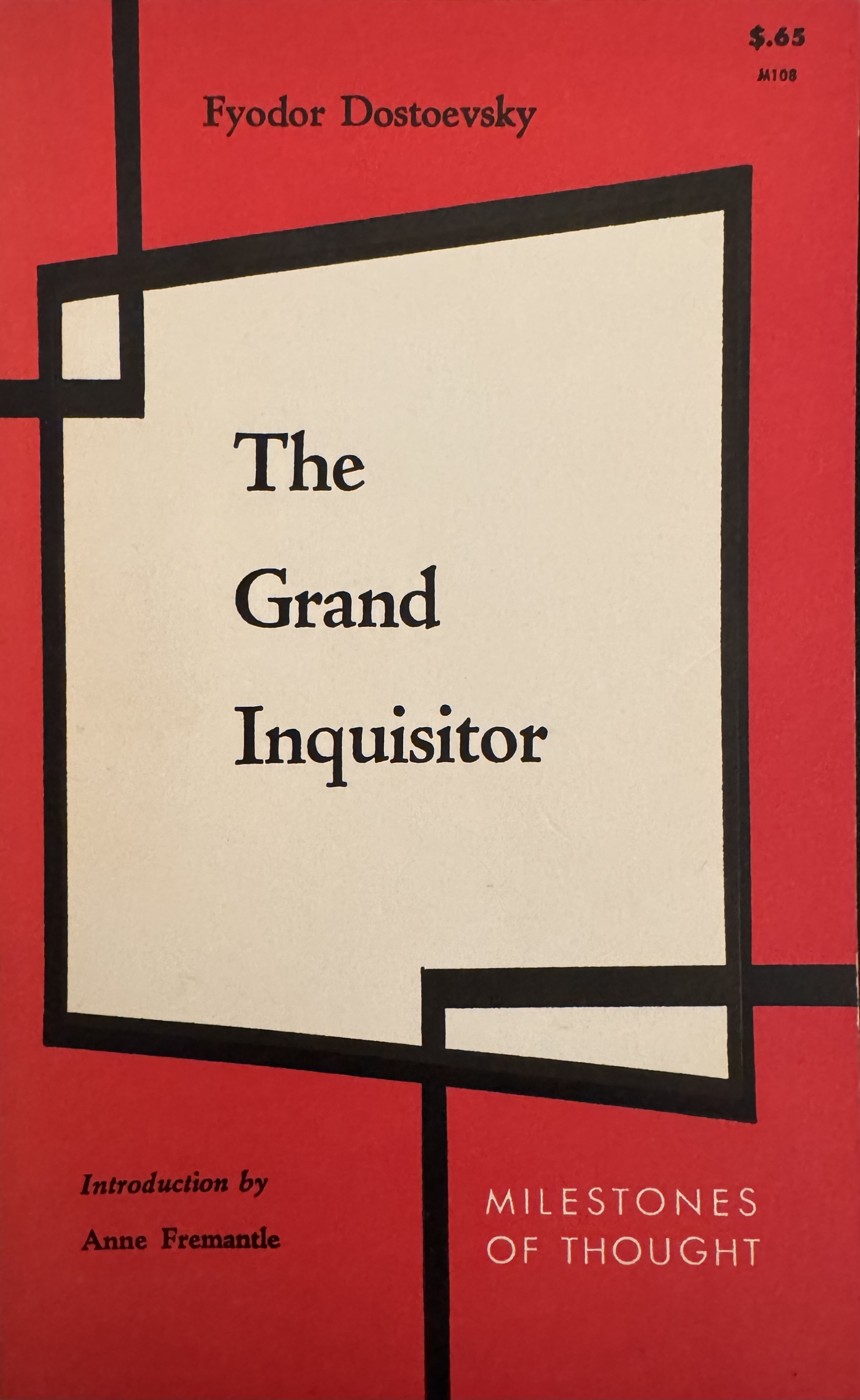
- Standalone copy of the chapter "The Grand Inquisitor"
- Country: Russia
- Language: Russian
- Genre(s): Poem, parable, philosophical fiction, story within a story
- Pages: 22

"The Grand Inquisitor" (Russian: Великий инквизитор) is a story within a story (called a poem by its fictional author) contained within Fyodor Dostoevsky's 1880 novel The Brothers Karamazov. It is recited by Ivan Fyodorovich Karamazov, during a conversation with his brother Alexei, a novice monk, about the possibility of a personal and benevolent God. "The Grand Inquisitor" is an important part of the novel and one of the best-known passages in modern literature because of its ideas about human nature and freedom.

In a long diatribe directed at Jesus himself, who has returned to Earth in Seville at the height of the Inquisition, the Grand Inquisitor defends the following ideas: only the principles of the Devil can lead to mankind's unification; give man bread, control his conscience, and rule the world; Jesus limited himself to a small group of chosen ones, while the Catholic Church improved on his work and addresses all people; the Church rules the world in the name of God, but with the Devil's principles; Jesus was mistaken in holding man in high esteem. Jesus remains silent throughout the Inquisitor's speech.

Scholars cite Friedrich Schiller's play Don Carlos (1787) as a major inspiration for Dostoevsky's "The Grand Inquisitor", while also noting that "The sources of the legend are extraordinarily varied and complex."

== Synopsis ==
The tale is told by Ivan with brief interruptive questions by Alyosha. In the tale, Christ returns to Earth in Seville at the time of the Inquisition. He performs a number of miracles (echoing miracles from the Gospels). The people recognize him and adore him at the Seville Cathedral, but He is arrested by Inquisition leaders and sentenced to be burnt to death the next day. The Grand Inquisitor visits him in his cell to tell him that the Church no longer needs him. The main portion of the text is devoted to the Inquisitor explaining to Jesus why his return would interfere with the mission of the Church.

The Inquisitor founds his denunciation of Jesus on the three questions that Satan asked Jesus during the temptation of Christ in the desert. These three are the temptation to turn stones into bread, the temptation to cast himself from the Temple and be saved by the angels, and the temptation to rule over all the kingdoms of the world. The Inquisitor states that Jesus rejected these three temptations in favor of freedom, but the Inquisitor thinks that Jesus has misjudged human nature. He does not believe that the vast majority of humanity can tolerate the freedom that Jesus has given to them. The Inquisitor thus implies that Jesus, in giving humans freedom to choose, has excluded the majority of humanity from redemption and doomed it to suffer.

Despite declaring the Inquisitor to be a nonbeliever, Ivan also has the Inquisitor saying that the Catholic Church follows "the wise spirit, the dread spirit of death and destruction" – meaning the Devil. He says: "We are not with Thee, but with him, and that is our secret! For centuries have we abandoned Thee to follow him." For the Inquisitor, it is the Devil who provided the tools to end human suffering and unite humanity under the banner of the Church. With the Church thus correctly organized, the multitude is guided by the few who are strong enough to take on the burden of freedom. The Inquisitor says that under him, all mankind will live and die happily in ignorance. Though he leads them only to "death and destruction", they will be happy along the way, for he and his representatives in the Church will relieve them of the terrible burden of freedom of conscience: "The most agonizing secrets of their consciences – all, all will they bring to us, and we shall resolve it all, and they will attend our decision with joy, because it will deliver them from the great anxiety and fearsome torments of free and individual decision."

The Inquisitor advances this argument by explaining why Christ was wrong to reject each temptation by Satan. Christ should have turned stones into bread, as men will always follow those who will feed their bellies, and will also follow one whom they see is capable of producing miracles. The Inquisitor recalls how Christ rejected this, saying "man cannot live on bread alone", and explains to Christ: "Feed men, and then ask of them virtue! That's what they'll write on the banner they'll raise against Thee and with which they will destroy Thy temple." Casting himself down from the temple to be caught by angels would cement his godhood in the minds of people, who would follow him forever. Ruling over all the kingdoms of the Earth would ensure their salvation, the Grand Inquisitor claims.

The segment ends when Christ, who has remained silent throughout, kisses the Inquisitor on his "bloodless, aged lips". The Inquisitor releases Christ but tells him never to return. Christ, still silent, leaves into "the dark alleys of the city". Ivan concludes: "The kiss burns in his heart, but the old man adheres to his idea".

After relating the tale, Ivan asks Alyosha if he "renounces" Ivan for his views. Alyosha responds by giving Ivan a soft kiss on the lips, to which the delighted Ivan replies: "That's plagiarism... Thank you, though". The brothers part soon afterward.

== Background ==
For Dostoevsky, the character of the Grand Inquisitor represents a prototypical expression of an ideology that denies Christ's true spiritual and historical significance and affirms its opposite. The Grand Inquisitor's anti-Christian philosophy is ironically accentuated by its appearance within an institutionally Christian context, but Dostoevsky identifies this same negation at the root of the socialist, nihilist and materialist doctrines of his contemporaries. In a letter to his publisher, he writes that Ivan, through the Grand Inquisitor, openly "declares himself in favour of what the Devil advocates". The Grand Inquisitor speaks the same doctrine as Russian socialism, except that the socialists would never admit it openly. Ivan, however, is "a sincere person who comes right out and admits that he agrees with the Inquisitor's view of humanity and that Christ's faith elevated man to a much higher level than where he actually stands." For the socialists, according to Dostoevsky, Christ's law is "burdensome and abstract, too heavy for weak people to bear—and instead of the law of Freedom and Enlightenment, they offer them the law of chains and enslavement through bread." Dostoevsky's notes contain passages that are more extreme than those eventually used. According to Edward Wasiolek, it is emphatically asserted in these notes that "it is Christ who is guilty and cruel, and it is the Grand Inquisitor who is kind and innocent. It is Christ who demands that men suffer for Him, whereas the Grand Inquisitor suffers for men."

According to literary scholar Joseph Frank, the prototype for the character of the Inquisitor can be found in Schiller's Don Carlos: "The play shares the same justification for the existence of evil in the world, the same answer to the problem of theodicy, that is at the heart of Dostoevsky's legend."

== Significance within the novel ==
Dostoevsky's intention with "The Legend of the Grand Inquisitor" was to unmask the fundamental idea that lay behind the entire movement in Russia toward atheism, nihilism, rationalism and materialism, and away from the true Christian faith that was the spiritual heart of the nation. Within the novel as a whole, this idea is expressed most rigorously and eloquently through the character of Ivan Fyodorovich: the 'poem' is Ivan's composition, and the ideas, dogmas, assertions, suggestions and equivocations expressed in the Inquisitor's monologue are the same ones at work within Ivan's tormented intellect and personal struggle for faith and identity. Though the poem's outward form is that of a monologue, a close analysis reveals its essentially dialogic nature, as an artistic representation of Ivan's idea in its encounters with other voices, both in the world and within himself. According to Mikhail Bakhtin, detailed analysis of the Legend reveals "a profound participation of all elements of Ivan's worldview in his internal dialogue with himself and in his internally polemical interrelations with others. For all its external proportionality, the "Legend" is nevertheless full of interruptions; both the very form of its construction as The Grand Inquisitor's dialogue with Christ and at the same time with himself, and, finally, the very unexpectedness and duality of its finale, indicate an internally dialogic disintegration at its very ideological core."

== Influence ==
- The composer Bernd Alois Zimmermann used this tale, along with Book of Ecclesiastes, in his oratorio Ecclesiastical Action.
- A filmed version of the poem was produced by BBC TV's Open University in 1975, with Sir John Gielgud as the Cardinal Grand Inquisitor and Michael Feast as The Prisoner.
- The poem was filmed as Inquisition in 2002 for Channel 5 in the UK, starring Sir Derek Jacobi as the Cardinal Grand Inquisitor and Stephen Billington as The Prisoner.
- Peter Brook produced a play based on "The Grand Inquisitor" starring Bruce Myers, performed at The Barbican, London, in February 2006.
- Louis Althusser cites "The Grand Inquisitor" as the original 'anticipatory' anti-socialist/anti-totalitarianism ideological work, in the chapter "On Ideology" in On the Reproduction of Capitalism.
- Orhan Pamuk transfers the story into an Islamic context in chapter 14 of his novel The Black Book, with a conversation between the Mahdi and the Great Pasha.

== See also ==
- Russian literature
- Don Carlos (play by Schiller)
