= Fyodor Karamazov =

Fictional character from The Brothers Karamazov

- First appearance: The Brothers Karamazov (1879–1880)
- Created by: Fyodor Dostoevsky

In-universe information
- Family: Dmitri Karamazov (son); Pavel Smerdyakov (son); Ivan Karamazov (son); Alexei Karamazov (son)
- Spouses: Adelia Ivanova Misuov; Sofia Ivanova

Fyodor Pavlovich Karamazov (Russian: Фёдор Павлович Карамазов) is a fictional character from the 1879–1880 novel The Brothers Karamazov by Fyodor Dostoevsky. He is the father of Alexei, Ivan, and Dmitri Karamazov, and rumoured also to be the father of his house servant Pavel Fyodorovich Smerdyakov. His conflict with the eldest son—Dimitri—comprises a major part of the book's overt plot, although it becomes clear as events unfold that Ivan's relation to him is equally significant. Each of the sons represents a distinct character, life orientation and filial attitude that allows Dostoevsky to examine the theme of the father-son relationship in all its complexity and moral ambiguity. Fyodor Pavlovich is a self-indulgent and shameless libertine, apparently not concerned in any way with the normal responsibilities of fatherhood or the welfare of his children. Moral questions, particularly those arising from notions of filial obligation, are thus tested in great depth, and the consideration of their relation to the wider reality of Russian social disintegration is always in the background.

At the trial following his murder, the prosecutor Ippolit Kirillovich describes Fyodor Pavlovich as follows:

Beginning life of noble birth, but in a poor dependent position, through an unexpected marriage he came into a small fortune. A petty knave, a toady and buffoon, of fairly good, though undeveloped, intelligence, he was, above all, a moneylender, who grew bolder with growing prosperity. His abject and servile characteristics disappeared, his malicious and sarcastic cynicism was all that remained. On the spiritual side he was undeveloped, while his vitality was excessive. He saw nothing in life but sensual pleasure, and he brought his children up to be the same. He had no feelings for his duties as a father. He ridiculed those duties. He left his little children to the servants, and was glad to be rid of them, forgot about them completely. The old man's maxim was Après moi le déluge. He was an example of everything that is opposed to civic duty, of the most complete and malignant individualism. 'The world may burn for aught I care, so long as I am all right,' and he was all right; he was content, he was eager to go on living in the same way for another twenty or thirty years.
