= Ivan Fyodorovich Karamazov =

Character in Dostoevsky's The Brothers Karamazov

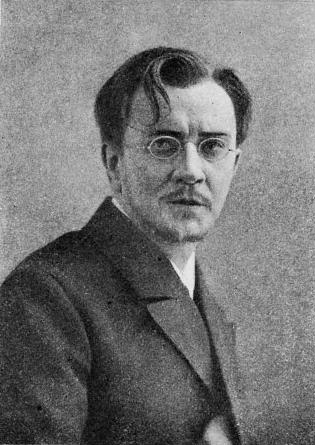
Ivan Karamazov as portrayed by Vasily Kachalov

Ivan Fyodorovich Karamazov (Russian: Ива́н Фёдорович Карама́зов) is a fictional character from the 1880 novel The Brothers Karamazov by Fyodor Dostoevsky. Ivan is 23 years old at the start of the novel; he is the elder brother of Alyosha Karamazov, younger half-brother of Dmitri Karamazov, and the son of Fyodor Karamazov. His relationships with his brothers (including his possible half-brother Smerdyakov), his father, and Katerina Ivanovna (Dmitri's betrothed) are hugely important to the novel's plot.

== Characteristics ==
Ivan, like his brothers, did not have a relationship with his father growing up. He was raised by relatives of his mother. After excelling in his education, he worked as a critic and journalist in Moscow. The narrator finds Ivan's arrival to be something of great note and wonders about it himself: "Generally considered, it was strange that so learned, so proud, and seemingly so prudent a young man should suddenly appear in such a scandalous house, before such a father..." Ivan stays for some time in his father's 'scandalous house' and, to all appearances, the two get along 'famously.'

Ivan is an atheist and is capable of articulating his philosophy with great clarity. Other characters in the book view him as aloof, cold, and intellectual. To begin with he has a cordial but distant relationship with his younger brother Alyosha, but it develops into one of love and mutual respect, despite their differences in age and beliefs. In Book 5, Chapters 3–5, Ivan explains his atheism to Alyosha and tells him why he cannot accept God's world. Throughout the novel, Ivan wrestles with his own moral beliefs, as he insists there is no good and evil. When his father is murdered, he falls deeper into despair, unable to resolve the problem of his own culpability for the crime. After a series of meetings with Smerdyakov, he falls into complete madness and begins having waking nightmares of visitations by the devil, with whom he converses.

== Relationship with other characters ==
=== Relationship with his father ===
Fyodor Pavlovich seems to respect Ivan, but Ivan maintains a strong dislike towards his father. After Dmitri attacks Fyodor Pavlovich (in Chapter 9, 'The Sensualists'), Ivan tells Alyosha it would not have troubled him if his father had been murdered and that "one reptile will devour another", despite having been the one to stop the attack. Fyodor Karamazov tells Alyosha that he's "more afraid of Ivan than of the other one."

Despite his father's pleas, Ivan leaves for Moscow after having a cryptic conversation with Smerdyakov which causes him to suspect some sort of plot. Following his father's murder Ivan seems to have no doubt that Dmitri is the murderer, but he is deeply troubled by his conversations with Smerdyakov, and by Alyosha's belief that Dmitri is innocent. His nagging suspicion of Smerdyakov seems to contain the implication of his own guilt, a possibility that tortures him.

=== Relationship with his brothers ===
==== Alyosha ====
Ivan and his younger brother get along well considering their philosophical differences. The two have dinner together where Ivan unburdens himself to Alyosha, before reciting to him 'The Grand Inquisitor.' After finishing his poem Ivan sees Alyosha's struggle to accept his beliefs, "now I see that in your heart, too, there is no room for me my dear hermit. The formula, 'everything is permitted' I will not renounce, and what then? Will you renounce me for that? Will you?" Alyosha says nothing, and kisses Ivan on the lips.

After Ivan starts to fall ill, and is visited by 'The Devil' Alyosha takes care of him, and does not condemn his brother for his beliefs. Alyosha talks to him until he falls unconscious, and puts him to bed. At the end of the book, we learn that Alyosha goes to visit his still unconscious brother, who is in the care of Katerina Ivanovna, twice a day. Though the book never explicitly says if Ivan will survive, both brothers are confident in their brother's recovery.

==== Dmitri ====
Ivan's relationship with Dmitri is less stable. Ivan seems to hate his carnal older brother, as much as his father. Dmitri is more goodhearted than his father, and he struggles with his passions and his conscience throughout the story. Ivan initially believes his brother to be his father's murderer, and visits him frequently while he's in prison.

Dmitri and Ivan experience conflict over Katerina Ivanovna. She is Dmitri's fiancee, despite his open passion for Grushenka. Ivan falls in love with Katerina, her feeling the same way, but both of them are too prideful to act on their love. Katerina and Ivan both testify in favor of Dmitri at his trial. Ivan, however, is nearly mad at this point and is removed from the courtroom. And Katerina, who starts by portraying Dmitri as a noble man realizes her doing so may incriminate Ivan, so she ends up 'betraying' her fiancee.

Ivan eventually recognizes that his brother is innocent and even plans his escape. He shares the plans with Katerina Ivanonva, as his own illness has left him unable to help.

==== Pavel Fyodorovich Smerdyakov ====
Rumored to be Fyodor Karamazov's illegitimate son, Smerdyakov immediately annoys Ivan. Smerdyakov takes an interest in, and starts to admire, Ivan and his cool intellectualism. Though Smerdyakov may have been viewed as intelligent, Ivan never recognizes this, likely because in doing so Ivan would recognize his own philosophical flaws. Smerdyakov faintly suggests to Ivan that he may kill their father, and when Ivan does nothing to stop this he takes it as 'permission.'

"Ivan Karamazov and Smerdyakov are two phenomena of Russian nihilism, two forms of its mutiny.... Ivan is an evolving philosophical manifestation of the nihilist revolt: Smerdyakov is its mean and subaltern expression; the one moves on the plane of the intellect, the other in life's basement. Smerdyakov translates the godless dialective of his half-brother into action and embodies his interior punishment."

Smerdyakov speaks with Ivan three times and then kills himself. Ivan, despite this, still testifies against him. Ivan is ultimately driven mad by seeing his philosophy acted out in the extreme by Smerdyakov, who claims Ivan gave him permission to kill Fyodor Karamazov.

== Philosophical significance ==
=== Nihilism ===
Dostoevsky uses Ivan as an embodiment of 19th century nihilism. This philosophy was spreading throughout Russia's youth at this time, and it is clearly portrayed in this novel and Ivan Turgenev's Fathers and Sons. Nihilism, in brief, is a rejection of God, immortality, and morals/authority leaving one to believe life is completely meaningless and that one can do whatever they please. Ivan comes off as a typical nihilist, but around his brother, Alyosha, he opens up more about why he rejected Christian doctrine.

=== 'Everything is Permitted' ===
The phrase, 'Everything is Permitted' becomes a mantra for the entire book and Ivan's philosophical beliefs. Despite his bold claim Ivan does not fail to point out others' moral wrongs. Alyosha recognizes his brother's internal turmoil by saying, "Ah, Mishka, he (Ivan) is a stormy soul. His mind is held captive. There is a great and unresolved thought in him. He's one of those who don't need millions, but need to resolve their thought."

Ivan, in short, cannot recognize Christ because he can not reconcile with innocent suffering, and he does not believe anyone is worthy of bringing eternal harmony. This philosophical struggle drives him mad with guilt, to the point of delirium and brain fever, because of his guilt and inability to truly deny virtue or fully accept Christ.

== Albert Camus ==
French-Algerian philosopher Albert Camus several times discusses Ivan. Considering him the ideal 'absurd man', an embodiment of his own philosophy: absurdism. In his 1942 work, The Myth of Sisyphus, he uses Ivan as an example of finding despair in all the freedom one can find in accepting nihilistic beliefs. In his work The Rebel Camus includes an entire chapter devoted to Ivan's views on evil, "With Ivan, however, the tone changes. God, in His turn, is put on trial. If evil is essential to divine creation, then creation is unacceptable." Camus even played Ivan in a stage adaption of the Brother Karamazov that he produced.

== Portrayals ==
- Bernhard Goetzke: The Brothers Karamazov (1921, silent film)
- Bernhard Minetti: Der Mörder Dimitri Karamasoff (1931, movie)
- Andrea Checchi: I fratelli Karamazoff (1947, movie)
- Richard Basehart: The Brothers Karamazov (1958, movie)
- Kirill Lavrov: The Brothers Karamazov (1969, movie)
- Umberto Orsini: I fratelli Karamazov (1969, TV series)
- Anatoliy Belyy: Bratya Karamazovy (2009, TV series)

== See also ==
- Alyosha Karamazov
- Fyodor Karamazov
- The Grand Inquisitor
