= Alyosha Karamazov =

Novel character

In-universe information
- Father: Fyodor Karamazov
- Mother: Sofia Ivanova
- Brothers: Ivan Karamazov
- Half-brothers: Dmitri Karamazov; Pavel Smerdyakov

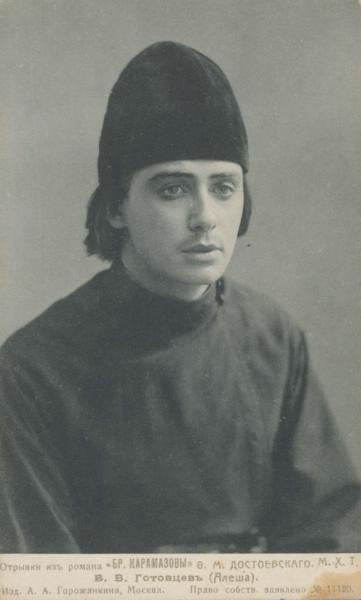
Actor Vladimir Gotovtsev as Alyosha in the play "The Brothers Karamazov" based on the novel by Fyodor Dostoevsky

Alexei Fyodorovich Karamazov (Russian: Алексе́й Фёдорович Карама́зов) is the protagonist of the 1880 novel The Brothers Karamazov by Fyodor Dostoevsky. He is usually referred to simply as Alyosha (Алёша). He is the youngest of the Karamazov brothers, being twenty years old at the start of the novel. The author’s preface and first chapters declare that Alyosha is the novel’s hero. Dostoevsky intended to write a sequel which would detail the rest of Alyosha's life, though he died shortly after the publication of The Brothers Karamazov.

At the outset of the story Alyosha is a novice in the local monastery. He is then sent out into the world by his Elder, Father Zosima, and leaves the monastery. Subsequently, he becomes embroiled in the sordid details of his family's life, and involved with extreme personalities and fraught relations. He also becomes acquainted with, and later engaged to, a 14-year-old girl named Lise Khokhlakov, daughter to a confidante of Katerina Ivanovna, his brother Dmitri’s fiancée. Alyosha is furthermore involved in a side story in which he befriends a group of school boys whose fate adds a hopeful message to the conclusion of an otherwise tragic novel.

Alyosha's place in the novel is usually that of a messenger or witness to the actions of his brothers and others.

== Concept and creation ==
Alyosha is named after Dostoevsky's son of the same name, who was born in 1875 but died in 1878 of epilepsy. Because of this Dostoevsky imbued Alyosha with qualities and characteristics which he sought and most admired, including that of Jesus Christ. Dostoevsky is believed to have based the character of Alyosha on his friend, Vladimir Solovyov, a Russian philosopher and poet who led a generous life, to the point of giving away his clothes to people in the street.

== Description ==
Alyosha is physically described as the following:

… Alyosha was then the picture of health, a sturdy, red-cheeked, clear-eyed lad of nineteen. He was very handsome, too, and slender, above average height, with dark-brown hair, a regular although rather long face, and shiny, dark-gray, wide-set eyes, which gave him a thoughtful and serene look.

— Dostoevsky, from The Brothers Karamazov

When it comes to his personality, Alyosha is depicted as a positive character - gentle, kind, loving and serene, though not naïve. In his youth, he was introspective and forgiving. During his school years, he was among the best in his class, though not the first, in regard to academics. At all times, he acts as a compassionate, wise and insightful peace-maker, and is loved and trusted by virtually everyone. He is described as the type who, in times of trouble, will either be cared for or will immediately find a way to care for himself. He is a realist, though inclined to believe in miracles, and once he has been convinced that he has witnessed a miracle, he remains certain that such events do occur.

Some of his primary desires are equality and love, as seen in the following quote:

… In his heart there is the secret of renewal for all, the power that will finally establish the truth on earth, and all will be holy and will love one another, and there will be neither rich nor poor, neither exalted nor humiliated, but all will be the like the children of God, and the true kingdom of Christ will come. That was the dream in Alyosha's heart.

— Dostoevsky, from The Brothers Karamazov

In creating the personality of Alyosha, Dostoevsky was in large part addressing himself to the contemporary Russian radical youth, showing them this ideal which Alyosha represents as a positive alternative to atheistic socialism that is not divorced from the Russian Orthodox tradition.

== Criticism ==
Anna-Theresa Tymieniecka states that Alyosha, like Prince Myshkin, the protagonist in another Dostoevsky novel, The Idiot, is an almost Jesus-like character, who is nevertheless unable to prevent the suffering of those around him. She suggests that as a witness or messenger, Alyosha is not a true moral agent, playing a passive role in the events of the novel.

Rufus W. Mathewson, however, argues that Alyosha Karamazov is a more successful hero than Prince Myshkin, due to his success at helping his brother, Dmitri.

== Portrayals ==
- Hermann Thimig is the first actor to play Alyosha in film in 1915's The Brothers Karamazov directed by Victor Tourjansky, now a lost film.
- Italian actor Carlo Conso portrayed the character in the 1947 Italian film I fratelli Karamazoff
- Canadian-American actor William Shatner portrays Alyosha in the 1958 American film adaptation.
- Russian actor Andrey Myagkov in the Soviet 1969 adaptation.
- Russian actor Aleksandr Golubev portrayed Alyosha in the 2009 Russian TV miniseries Bratya Karamazovy.
