= Cuppy =

Cuppy may refer to:

- 15017 Cuppy, an asteroid
- Cuppy's Coffee, a chain of coffee shops
- DJ Cuppy (often simply Cuppy) (b. 1992), a Nigerian musician
- George Cuppy (1869–1922), an American baseball player
- Will Cuppy, an American humorist
