= Malcolm Jameson =

American novelist (1891–1945)

- Born: December 21, 1891; Waco, Texas, US
- Died: April 16, 1945 (aged 53); Bronx, New York, US

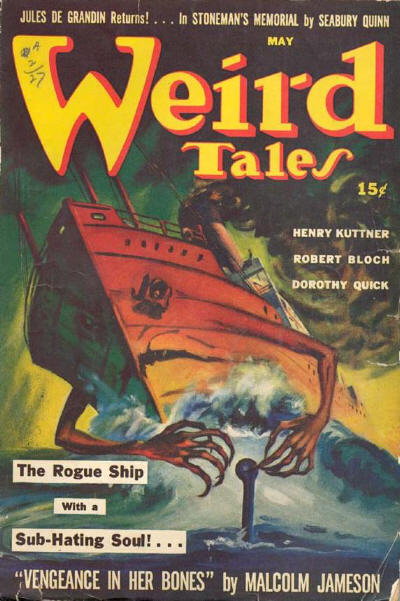
Jameson's "Vengeance in Her Bones" was the cover story in the May 1942 Weird Tales

Malcolm Routh Jameson (December 21, 1891 – April 16, 1945), commonly known as Malcolm Jameson, was an American science fiction author. An officer in the US Navy, he was active in American pulp magazines during the Golden Age of Science Fiction. His writing career began when complications of throat cancer limited his activity. According to John W. Campbell Jr., Jameson "had much to do with the development of modern [c.1945] naval ordnance."

Jameson's first published fiction appeared in Astounding Science Fiction in 1938. His story "Doubled and Redoubled" may be the earliest work of fiction to feature a time loop. His stories of Solar System exploration about "Bullard of the Space Patrol" were posthumously collected in 1951 and won the Boys Clubs of America Award; reviewing that collection, Boucher and McComas praised Bullard as "the most successfully drawn series character in modern science fiction." P. Schuyler Miller wrote that Jameson drew on his own naval experience to give the stories "a warm atmosphere of reality."

Alfred Bester described meeting Jameson in about 1939: "Mort Weisinger introduced me to the informal luncheon gatherings of the working science fiction authors of the late thirties... Malcolm Jameson, author of navy-oriented space stories, was there, tall, gaunt, prematurely grey, speaking in slow, heavy tones. Now and then he brought along his pretty daughter, who turned everybody's head."

== Twilight Zone episode ==
His novella "Blind Alley", first published in the June 1943 issue of Unknown, was the basis for the 1963 Twilight Zone episode "Of Late I Think of Cliffordville" starring Albert Salmi, John Anderson, and Julie Newmar. This hour-long fourth season episode was broadcast on April 11, 1963. The story was reprinted in The Twilight Zone: The Original Stories, edited by Martin H. Greenberg, Richard Matheson, and Charles G. Waugh, Avon, 1985, and in Unknown Worlds, edited by Stanley Schmidt and Martin H. Greenberg, Galahad Books, 1988.

"Blind Alley," which begins in 1942, is about a greedy, grouchy New York financier, Jack Feathersmith, whose many complaints about his life are tinged with nostalgic remembrances of his hometown, Cliffordsville (whose exact location is not specified but, from references in the text, may be in Texas not far from Dallas), around the turn of the 20th century. He is acquainted with a provider of occult services who he decides to contact for a trip back in time 40 years to Cliffordsville when his health begins to fail and he is forced to retire. Dreaming of the fortunes he will make with his foreknowledge of the future and of reconnecting with the girl he left behind when he fled Cliffordsville at age 30, he makes the journey after handing over his entire fortune to Satan (who already owned his soul and had for many years), only to find life in 1902 a continual parade of wide-ranging disillusionments and hardships that ends in misery.

== Stories in Unknown/Unknown Worlds ==
Jameson had eleven stories published in the magazine Unknown/Unknown Worlds in the early 1940s:

- "Philtered Power", March 1940.
- "Doubled and Redoubled", February 1941.
- "Not According to Dante", June 1941.
- "Even the Angels", August 1941.
- "In His Own Image", February 1942.
- "The Old Ones Hear", June 1942.
- "Fighters Never Quit", August 1942.
- "The Goddess' Legacy", October 1942.
- "The Giftie Gien", April 1943.
- "Blind Alley", June 1943. * (novelette)
- "Heaven Is What You Make It", August 1943. (novelette)

== Works ==
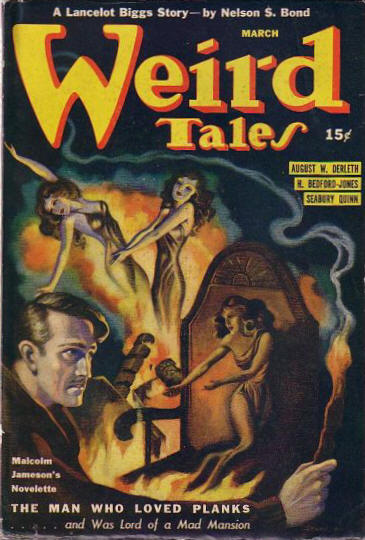
Jameson's novelette "The Man Who Loved Planks" was the cover story in the March 1941 Weird Tales

- "Blind Alley", novella, Unknown, June 1943.
- "Vengeance in Her Bones", short story, Weird Tales, May 1942
- "Wreckers of the Star Patrol," Super Science Stories, August 1942
- Atomic Bomb, New York, A Bond-Charteris Publication, 1945, first serialized in Startling Stories in 1944 as The Giant Atom.
- Bullard of the Space Patrol, edited by Andre Norton, Cleveland, World Pub. Co., "World Junior Library", 1951, 235 p.
  - World Pub., Co., 1955. Reprint edition, excluded the story "The Bureaucrat".
  - E-book publication as Bullard, from Cadet to Commander: A Story of the Space Patrol, Spellcaster E Books, January 2005.
- Tarnished Utopia, Galaxy novels No. 27, 1956, 128p.
- Land of the Burning Sea, e-book, Spellcaster E Books, September 2005, originally published in April 1942 in Thrilling Wonder Stories.
- "The Bureaucrat", novelette, Astounding Science Fiction, April 1944, (pg 117–143)
- "Tricky Tonnage", short story, Astounding Science Fiction, December 1944
