= Feldkamp =

Feldkamp is a surname. Notable people with the surname include:

- Fred Feldkamp (1914–1981), American writer, editor, and film producer
- Karl-Heinz Feldkamp (born 1934), German footballer and manager
- Michael F. Feldkamp (born 1962), German historian and journalist
