= Of Late I Think of Cliffordville =

- The Twilight Zone episode
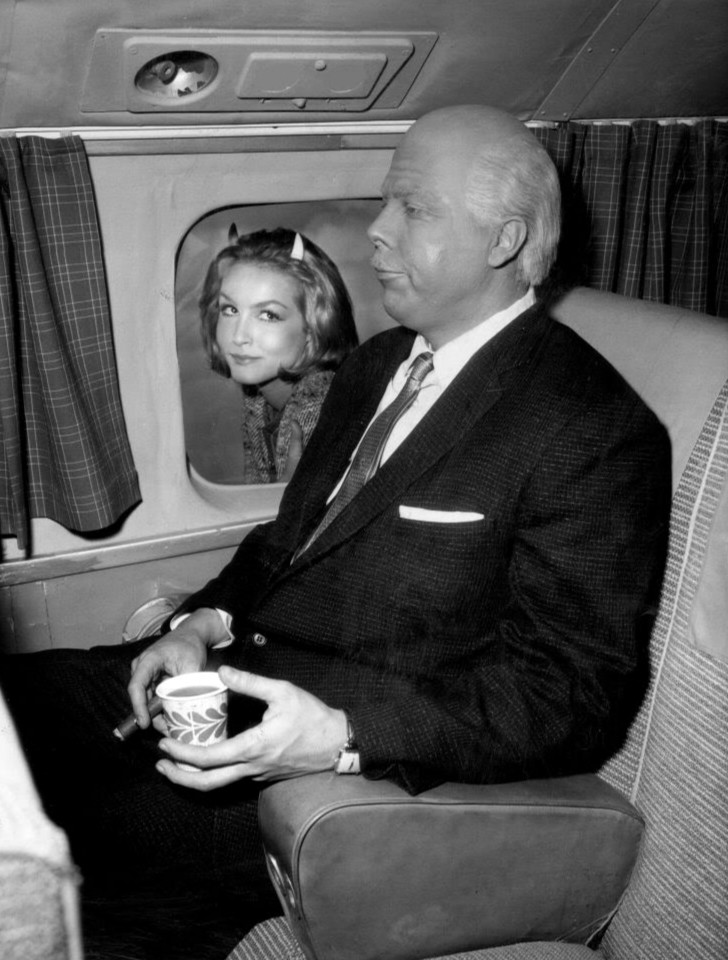
- Julie Newmar as Miss Devlin and Albert Salmi as William Feathersmith
- Episode no.: Season 4 Episode 14
- Directed by: David Lowell Rich
- Written by: Rod Serling
- Based on: "Blind Alley" by Malcolm Jameson
- Production code: 4867
- Original air date: April 11, 1963

Guest appearances
- Albert Salmi; Julie Newmar; John Anderson; Wright King; Guy Raymond; John Harmon; Hugh Sanders

Episode chronology
| ← Previous "The New Exhibit" | Next → "The Incredible World of Horace Ford" |
- The Twilight Zone (1959 TV series) (season 4)

"Of Late I Think of Cliffordville" is the 116th episode of the American television anthology series The Twilight Zone. It originally aired on April 11, 1963, on CBS. In this episode, an elderly business tycoon buys the opportunity to enjoy amassing his fortune a second time.

== Opening narration ==
Witness a murder. The killer is Mr. William Feathersmith, a robber baron whose body composition is made up of a refrigeration plant covered by thick skin. In a moment, Mr. Feathersmith will proceed on his daily course of conquest and calumny with yet another business dealing. But this one will be one of those bizarre transactions that take place in an odd marketplace known as the Twilight Zone.

== Plot ==
William J. Feathersmith, the 75-year-old president of a major corporation, is a ruthless businessman who has built his wealth by exploiting others. One night, a drunken Feathersmith confesses to the janitor, Mr. Hecate, that having reached the height of success, he is left feeling empty and purposeless, and dreams of returning to his small hometown of Cliffordville, Indiana, to start life anew. Hecate says that Cliffordville happens to be his hometown, as well.

Attempting to go home for the night, Feathersmith is instead taken by the elevator to the 13th floor, where he finds a travel agency that was not there the day before. The agency's increasingly two-horned head, "Miss Devlin", is revealed to be the Devil. Devlin offers to fulfill his wish to return to 1910 Cliffordville, agreeing to his terms that he will look the same as he did then, but retain all memories of his first life, in exchange for almost all his liquidated worth, leaving him with $1,412. As he knows which investments have succeeded and which have failed in the last 50 years, Feathersmith agrees.

Back in 1910 Cliffordville, Feathersmith tries to woo the daughter of a bank owner, but is startled that rather than being the charming girl he remembers, she is plain, plays the piano poorly, chatters incessantly, and insists on entertaining guests with her shrill singing. He uses $1,403 to buy 1,403 acres of land which he knows to contain deposits of oil. He forgets, however, that the drill needed to access oil so far beneath the ground will not be invented until 1937. He tries to "invent" devices such as a self-starter for automobiles, but does not know how to design them. The townspeople ridicule this, which causes Feathersmith to suffer palpitations. He realizes that following the strict letter of his terms, Devlin has made him appear 30, but he is still biologically 75. When Devlin appears, Feathersmith accuses her of altering the past, even though she says that all is as it was, and that he just remembered it differently. She needles him for living off the work of others and being unable to create anything himself.

He pleads with Devlin to send him back to 1963, even after she warns him that his actions in 1910 have changed things, and it can no longer be the 1963 he knew. She agrees to fulfill his wish for just $40. Having no money left, Feathersmith hastily sells the deed to his land to Hecate for the $40.

In the altered 1963, Hecate is the president of the corporation, having amassed his fortune with the money earned from the oil dug up in 1937, while Feathersmith now works as the building's janitor. Hecate mocks Feathersmith for having been in his position for over forty years.

== Closing narration ==
Mr. William J. Feathersmith, tycoon, who tried the track one more time and found it muddier than he remembered, proving with at least a degree of conclusiveness that nice guys don't always finish last, and some people should quit when they're ahead. Tonight's tale of iron men and irony, delivered F.O.B. from the Twilight Zone.

== Cast ==
- Albert Salmi as William Feathersmith
- John Anderson as Dietrich
- Wright King as Mr. Hecate
- Guy Raymond as Gibbons
- Christine Burke as Joanna
- John Harmon as Clark
- Hugh Sanders as Cronk
- Julie Newmar as Miss Devlin

== Production ==
In the scene in which Feathersmith negotiates his way out of Cliffordville, several crates in the alley are marked "This End Up", which were used as shipping crates for the wax figures in the previous episode, "The New Exhibit".

In a published version of Twilight Zone stories, "Blind Alley", this story is somewhat different—it takes place during World War II, although Feathersmith is still a self centered sadistic bore—but is also a very sick elderly man . He makes a deal with the Devil to go back in 1910 to his hometown of Cliffordsville, Texas (instead of Indiana). As in the show, he fails to make any fortune as he realizes too late that the equipment for drilling deep oil hasn't been invented yet. He forgets to ask for the restoration of his health and youth and dies after a week in the past.
