= Will Kuluva =

American actor

- Born: May 2, 1917; Kansas City, Missouri, U.S.
- Died: November 6, 1990 (aged 73); Bequia, Saint Vincent and the Grenadines
- Education: University of Kansas City (AB)
- Occupation: Actor
- Years active: 1949-1988

Will Kuluva (May 2, 1917 – November 6, 1990) was an American actor.

== Early years ==
Kuluva was born on May 2, 1917, in Kansas City, Missouri, the son of Mr. and Mrs. Joseph Kuluva. His father owned a department store. He graduated from Central High School. After enrolling at St. Louis University, he went to the University of Kansas City, where he majored in dramatics and graduated with an A. B. degree in 1937. He was also educated at the American Academy of Dramatic Arts in New York and the Royal Academy of Dramatic Arts in London.

During World War II Kuluva was a first lieutenant in the Fifth Army. He was wounded and received a Purple Heart. Following his release from a hospital, he served in an entertainment troup that toured battle fronts until the war ended.

== Career ==
Kuluva's Broadway credits included Steel (1939), Hold on to Your Hats (1940), The Wanhope Building (1947), Open House (1947), The Alchemist (1948), King Richard III (1949), That Lady (1949), Arms and the Man (1950), Darkness at Noon (1951), The Shrike (1952), My 3 Angels (1953), and A Very Special Baby (1956).

His film debut came in Abandoned. Other films in which he appeared included Viva Zapata!, Operation Manhunt, The Shrike, Crime in the Streets, Odds Against Tomorrow, Go Naked in the World, The Spiral Road and The Missiles of October. He appeared in the television series The Untouchables, The Twilight Zone, The Man from U.N.C.L.E., Hawaii Five-O, Perry Mason, It Takes a Thief, Primus, Mission: Impossible, and Quincy, M.E., among others.

== Death ==
He died on November 6, 1990, in Bequia, Saint Vincent and the Grenadines at age 73.

== Filmography ==
1966	The Wild Wild West	Baroda	S2:E14, "The Night of the Infernal Machine"
1949	Abandoned	Little Guy Decola	
1952	Viva Zapata!	Lazaro	Uncredited
1954	Operation Manhunt	Rostovich	
1955	The Shrike	John Ankortis	
1956	Crime in the Streets	Mr. Gioia	
1959	Odds Against Tomorrow	Bacco	
1960	Alfred Hitchcock Presents	Joey	S5:E31, "I Can Take Care of Myself"
1960	Alfred Hitchcock Presents	Stefan Bregornick	S6:E9, "The Money"
1961	Go Naked in the World	Argus Dlavolos	
1961	The Twilight Zone	De Cruz	S3:E6, "The Mirror"
1962	The Spiral Road	Dr. Sordjano	
1962	Bonanza	General Arturo Diaz	S4:E10, "The Deadly Ones"
1963	The Twilight Zone	Ernest Ferguson	S4:E13, "The New Exhibit"
1964	Perry Mason	Homer Doubleday	S8:E12, "The Case of the Wooden Nickels"
1967	The Spy in the Green Hat	Mr. Thaler, Thrush Boss	
1968	Massacre Harbor	Bertaine	
1968	Mission: Impossible	Edmund Constantine	S2:E19, "The Condemned"
1969	It Takes a Thief	France	S2:E19, "Boom at the Top"
1969	Mission: Impossible	Rudolf Kurtz	S3:E12, "The Exchange"
1970	It Takes a Thief	Zoltan	S3:E20, "To Sing a Song of Murder"
1970	The Christine Jorgensen Story	Professor Estabrook	
1970	Dan August	Jacob Foschke	S1:E11, "The Soldier"
1971	Mission: Impossible	Premier Miguel Fuego	S5:E19, "The Catafalque"
1971-1972	Primus	Charlie Kingman	26 episodes
1972	Mission: Impossible	Anton Malta	S7:E4, "Leona"
1972	Pursuit	Dr. Wolff	TV movie
1973	Cannon	Mr. Arditti	S3:E7, "Come Watch Me Die"
1974	The Missiles of October	Valerian Zorin	TV movie
1982	Hart to Hart	Giorgio Cabri	S3:E19, "Vintage Harts"
1982	Voyager from the Unknown	Louis Pasteur	
