= Primus (TV series) =

- Created by: Ivan Tors
- Starring: Robert Brown; Will Kuluva; Eva Renzi
- Country of origin: United States
- No. of episodes: 26

Production
- Production company: Ivan Tors Productions

Original release
- Network: Syndication
- Release: September 15, 1971 – June 9, 1972

Primus is an American first-run syndicated undersea adventure series which aired in 1971–1972. It told the adventures of Carter Primus (Robert Brown). The series was produced by Ivan Tors and one season of 26 episodes was filmed.

== Cast ==
- Robert Brown as Carter Primus
- Will Kuluva as Charlie Kingman
- Eva Renzi as Toni Hayden

== Episodes ==
No.	Title	Original airdate
1	"Ten Minutes to Eternity"	September 15, 1971
2	"Deepest of the Deep"	September 22, 1971
3	"Trial and Terror"	September 29, 1971
4	"Kiss of Life"	October 6, 1971
5	"Underwater Getaway"	October 20, 1971
6	"The Phantom Horse"	October 27, 1971
7	"The Bearer of Light"	November 3, 1971
8	"The Oil Rig"	November 10, 1971
9	"Pipeline for Danger"	November 17, 1971
10	"Breaking Point"	November 24, 1971
11	"The 65th Minute"	December 4, 1971
12	"Blade of Fire"	December 8, 1971
13	"Tekite #1"	December 15, 1971
14	"49 Sharks"	December 22, 1971
15	"The Sea is Boiling Hot"	December 29, 1971
16	"Death Tide"	January 5, 1972
17	"Sea Serpent"	January 12, 1972
18	"The Sniper"	January 19, 1972
19	"The Steel Fish"	April 21, 1972
20	"Black Diamonds"	April 28, 1972
21	"Infrared"	May 5, 1972
21	"Nuclear Black Market"	May 5, 1972
23	"The Black Hole"	May 19, 1972
24	"Trapped Part 1"	May 26, 1972
25	"Trapped Part 2"	June 2, 1972
26	"Underwater Getaway"	June 9, 1972

== In other media ==
A paperback Primus novel by Bradford Street and Ivan Tors was published by Bantam Books in 1971.

Charlton Comics published a short lived Primus comic book (7 issues - February 1972 to October 1972).
