= A Most Unusual Camera =

- The Twilight Zone episode
- Episode no.: Season 2 Episode 10
- Directed by: John Rich
- Written by: Rod Serling
- Production code: 173-3606
- Original air date: December 16, 1960

Guest appearances
- Fred Clark as Chester; Jean Carson as Paula; Adam Williams as Woodward; Marcel Hillaire as Waiter

Episode chronology
← Previous "The Trouble with Templeton"	Next → "The Night of the Meek"
- The Twilight Zone (1959 TV series, season 2)

"A Most Unusual Camera" is episode 46 of the American television anthology series The Twilight Zone, and was the tenth episode of the second season. It originally aired on December 16, 1960 on CBS, and was an episode written by the show's creator, Rod Serling. The episode starred Fred Clark and Jean Carson. The episode was produced for season one of the show, but was delayed to season two.

== Opening narration ==
A hotel suite that, in this instance, serves as a den of crime, the aftermath of a rather minor event to be noted on a police blotter, an insurance claim, perhaps a three-inch box on page twelve of the evening paper. Small addenda to be added to the list of the loot: a camera, a most unimposing addition to the flotsam and jetsam that it came with, hardly worth mentioning really, because cameras are cameras, some expensive, some purchasable at five-and-dime stores. But this camera, this one's unusual because in just a moment we'll watch it inject itself into the destinies of three people. It happens to be a fact that the pictures that it takes can only be developed in The Twilight Zone.

== Plot ==
Two thieves, husband and wife Chester and Paula Diedrich, have just robbed an antique shop and returned to the hotel suite they are using as a hideout. Chester dismisses most of the items they have stolen as junk, but finds a strange old box camera among them. When he takes a picture of Paula, it generates a self-developing photo of her wearing a fur coat. After she finds one inside a stolen chest and puts it on, the pair realize that the camera's pictures show the immediate future of its subjects. Its next picture accurately predicts the arrival of Paula's brother Woodward, who had just escaped from prison.

A televised horse race gives Chester the idea to take a picture of the blank winners' board at the local track before each of the day's races are run, then place bets based on the pictures' results. After winning thousands of dollars, they celebrate in their suite, where a waiter named Pierre takes notice of their camera and translates its French inscription "dix à la propriétaire" as "ten to an owner". Once Chester ushers Pierre out, he determines that the trio have taken a total of eight pictures. As they struggle over the camera, arguing about how to use the final two, they accidentally take a picture that shows a terrified Paula. Chester and Woodward continue their fight, but fall out an open window to their deaths. Paula reacts as in the picture, but calms down once she realizes that she can now keep all the money for herself.

She snaps the tenth and final picture of the two bodies and prepares to leave, only to be interrupted by Pierre. Having learned of her status as a wanted criminal, he robs her and threatens to turn her in to the police if she calls them for help. Glancing at the picture, he remarks that it shows more than two bodies in the courtyard below. Paula rushes to the window to check, but trips on an electrical cord and falls out of it to her demise. Pierre counts the corpses in the picture, but notices that there are four instead of three. Shocked, he drops the camera and falls out the window as well.

== Closing narration ==
Object known as a camera, vintage uncertain, origin unknown. But for the greedy, the avaricious, the fleet of foot, who can run a four-minute mile so long as they're chasing a fast buck, it makes believe that it's an ally, but it isn't at all. It's a beckoning come-on for a quick walk around the block—in The Twilight Zone.

== See also ==
- List of The Twilight Zone (1959 TV series) episodes
- The X-Files episode “Unruhe” with a similar future-predicting camera
- The Goosebumps children's novels, Say Cheese and Die and Say Cheese and Die–Again
  - The Goosebumps HorrorLand novella Say Cheese–and Die Screaming
- "Killer Camera", a short story from Anthony Horowitz's Horowitz Horror
- "Treehouse of Horror XV's" "The Ned Zone"
- The film Time Lapse
