= Robert Brown (American actor) =

American actor (1926–2022)

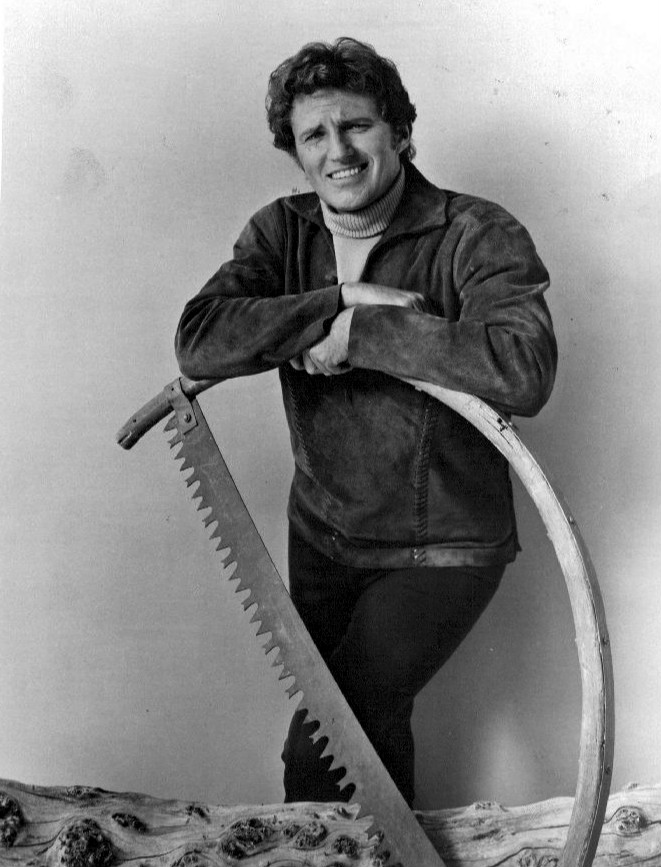
- Brown as Jason Bolt in 1969
- Born: Robin Adair MacKenzie Brown; November 17, 1926; Trenton, New Jersey, U.S.
- Died: September 19, 2022 (aged 95); Ojai, California, U.S.
- Occupations: Actor; writer
- Years active: 1948–1994
- Spouses: Leila Brown (m. 1949; div. 1954) Mary Elizabeth “Bunny” Sellers (m. 1961; div. 1967) Anna Katherine Quanstrom (m. 1969; div. 1980) Elisse Pogofsky-Harris (m. 1986; died 2018)
- Children: 3

Robert Brown (born Robin Adair MacKenzie Brown; November 17, 1926 – September 19, 2022) was an American film and television actor who was mostly active in the 1960s and 1970s.

== Life and career ==
Brown was born in Trenton, New Jersey. After serving in the United States Navy, Brown studied with Lee Strasberg at the Dramatic Workshop. His classmates included Rod Steiger, Harry Belafonte and Walter Matthau.

Brown guest-starred on numerous television programs. He was cast in the role of Peter Coll in the two-part episode "The Mad Dog Coll Story" of the NBC series The Lawless Years, which was broadcast on July 28 and August 4, 1961. He made three guest appearances on Perry Mason: as murderer Frank Sykes in the 1960 episode "The Case of the Larcenous Lady", murderer Goring Gilbert in the 1963 episode "The Case of the Reluctant Model", and as Tracey Walcott in the 1964 episode "The Case of the Sleepy Slayer".

In 1962, he was cast as a minister in an episode of the NBC western television series Bonanza ("Blessed Are They"). Brown appeared as both of the two beings alternating in the character of Lazarus on the Star Trek episode "The Alternative Factor" (1967). He was cast at the last minute when John Drew Barrymore failed to appear for shooting.

Brown had a starring role as the charismatic, fast-talking Jason Bolt in the 1968–70 ABC television series Here Come the Brides.

He appeared once on Bewitched, playing the role of the come-alive Gloucester Fisherman's Memorial statue in "Darrin on a Pedestal" which aired on October 22, 1970.

He starred as Carter Primus in the 1971–1972 syndicated sea adventure television series Primus.

His only feature film credits are the science fiction film The Flame Barrier (1958) and the horror film Tower of London (1962). In 1975, Brown appeared as the son of the murder victim in the Columbo episode "Playback".

Brown was a close friend of Carroll O'Connor and appeared in an episode of O'Connor's series Archie Bunker's Place in 1979 and an episode of In the Heat of the Night titled "Poor Relations," which aired in 1994.

Brown did voiceover work for radio and television. He was also a writer, working on short stories and a novel.

== Death ==
Brown died in Ojai, California, on September 19, 2022, at the age of 95.
