= Will Cuppy =

American writer

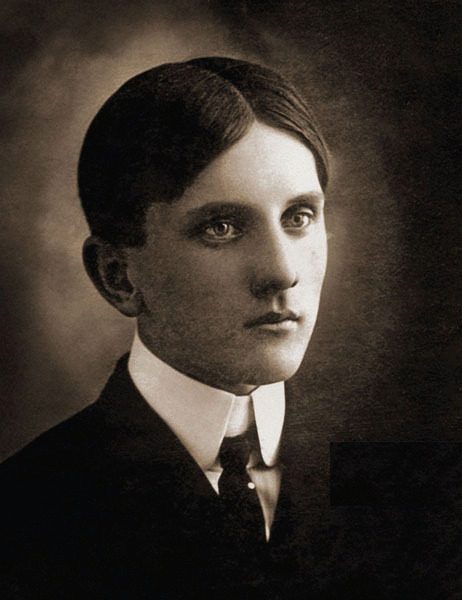
- Cuppy high school graduation picture, 1902
- Born: William Jacob Cuppy; August 23, 1884; Auburn, Indiana, US
- Died: September 19, 1949 (aged 65); New York City, US
- Education: University of Chicago
- Occupations: Satirist, book reviewer
- Writing career
- Genres: Humor, satire
- Notable works: The Decline and Fall of Practically Everybody, How to Be a Hermit, How to Become Extinct, How to Tell Your Friends from the Apes, How to Attract the Wombat

William Jacob Cuppy (August 23, 1884 – September 19, 1949) was an American humorist and literary critic, known for his satirical books about nature and historical figures.

== Early life ==
Cuppy was born in Auburn, Indiana. He was named "Will" in memory of an older brother of his father's who died of wounds he received as a Union officer at the Civil War Battle of Fort Donelson. Cuppy's father, Thomas Jefferson Cuppy (1844–1912), was at different times a grain dealer, a seller of farm implements and a lumber buyer for the Eel River branch of the Wabash Railroad. His mother, Frances Stahl Cuppy (1855–1927), was a seamstress and worked in a small shop located next to the family home in Auburn. Young Cuppy spent summers at a farm belonging to his grandmother, Sarah Collins Cuppy (1813–1900), on the banks of the Eel River near South Whitley, Indiana. He later said that this was where he acquired his early knowledge of the natural world which he satirized in his writings.

Cuppy graduated from Auburn High School in 1902 and went on to the University of Chicago, where he received a bachelor's degree in 1907. As an undergraduate, he belonged to Phi Gamma Delta, acted in amateur theater and worked as campus reporter for several Chicago newspapers, notably the Record Herald and the Daily News. He lingered at Chicago seven more years as a graduate student in English literature. He did not show much interest in his studies, but in 1910 produced his first book, Maroon Tales, a collection of short stories about university life. In 1914 he pulled together a short master's thesis, took his degree and left for New York.

== Literary career ==
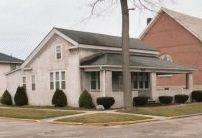
Will Cuppy's childhood home in Auburn, Indiana, in 2004. Cuppy's maternal grandfather George W. Stahl built the house, later extensively modified, in 1851. It received an Indiana State Historical Marker in 2019

Cuppy supported himself in New York by writing advertising copy while he tried unsuccessfully to write a play. He served briefly stateside in World War I as a second lieutenant in the U.S. Army Motor Transport Corps. Later he began contributing book reviews to the New York Tribune, where his college friend Burton Rascoe (1892–1957) was literary editor. According to Rascoe, it was his assistant Isabel Paterson who "coaxed and coddled" Cuppy into writing reviews and making a success of his career as a writer. In 1926, Cuppy began writing a weekly "Light Reading" column, later renamed "Mystery and Adventure", for the Tribune's successor, the New York Herald Tribune. He continued writing the column until his death 23 years later, reviewing a career total of more than 4,000 titles of crime and detective fiction.

Seeking refuge from city noise and hay fever (which he referred to as "rose cold"), Cuppy "hermited" from 1921 to 1929 in a shack on Jones Island, just off Long Island's South Shore. The literary result of Cuppy's seaside exile was How to be a Hermit, a humorous look at home economics that went through six printings in four months when it appeared in 1929. The book's subtitle, A Bachelor Keeps House, reflects the fact that Cuppy never married. The crew at the nearby Zachs Inlet Coast Guard Station shared their food and recipes with Cuppy and helped him repair his shack.

Encroachment by the new Jones Beach State Park forced Cuppy to abandon full-time residence on the island and return to New York's noise and soot. A special dispensation from New York's parks czar Robert Moses (1888–1981) let Cuppy keep his shack. He made regular visits to his place at the beach until the end of his life.

From his Greenwich Village apartment, Cuppy continued to turn out magazine articles and books. He always worked from notes jotted on 3x5-inch index cards. Cuppy would amass hundreds of cards even for a short article. His friend and literary executor Fred Feldkamp (1914–1981) reported that Cuppy sometimes read more than 25 thick books on a subject before he wrote a single word about it.

External images
- https://www.ancestry.com/mediaui-viewer/tree/5352750/person/-1465620075/media/5cebf719-7891-4c44-bfed-36b404d23b0f 1932 promotional photo of Will Cuppy.
- https://www.ancestry.com/mediaui-viewer/tree/5352750/person/-1465620075/media/d7fbf270-6065-478d-b010-beee6699e5f4 The link is to an image of Will Cuppy that appeared in Publishers Weekly in 1937. The picture is from a Bobbs-Merrill party for Marjorie Hillis, author of Orchids on Your Budget, which became the number-five nonfiction bestseller of 1937. Shown from left to right are: 1) an unidentified model dressed as "Miss R," one of the "case histories" in the book; 2) Marjorie Hillis; 3) Will Cuppy (standing); and 4) author Constance Lindsay Skinner.
- https://www.ancestry.com/mediaui-viewer/tree/5352750/person/-1465620075/media/1ade8c52-d5a4-4486-958a-f45c5494c87f The link is to an image of Will Cuppy that appeared on the dust jacket of the first edition of The Decline and Fall of Practically Everybody. It is captioned, "One of the last photographs taken of Will Cuppy in his New York City apartment."
- https://www.ancestry.com/mediaui-viewer/tree/5352750/person/-1465620075/media/afa6c7b1-9806-4593-9007-4edf7d42a20d Will Cuppy discussing mystery stories on John Towner Frederick's "Of Men and Books" radio program in 1942.
- http://earchives.lib.purdue.edu/cdm4/item_viewer.php?CISOROOT=/earhart&CISOPTR=3585&CISOBOX=1&REC=4 The link is to an image of a telegram from Will Cuppy received by Amelia Earhart in London on May 22, 1932, after she flew solo across the Atlantic.

Writing funny but factual magazine articles was Cuppy's real talent. He enjoyed a brief success in 1933 with a humorous talk show on NBC radio with actress and gourmet cook Jeanne Owen, but he flopped on the lecture circuit. Basically shy, Cuppy was happiest when he was rummaging through scholarly journals prizing out facts to copy out on his note cards. According to Feldkamp, one of Cuppy's favorite places was the Bronx Zoo, "where he felt really relaxed."

Many of Cuppy's articles for The New Yorker and other magazines were later collected as books: How to Tell Your Friends from the Apes (1931); and How to Become Extinct (1941). Cuppy also edited three collections of mystery stories: World's Great Mystery Stories (1943); World's Great Detective Stories (1943); and Murder Without Tears (1946). His last animal book, How to Attract the Wombat, appeared two months after his death in 1949.

Cuppy's best-known work, a satire on history called The Decline and Fall of Practically Everybody, was unfinished when he died. Its humor ranges from the remark that, when the Nile floods receded, the land, as far as the eye can see, is "covered by Egyptologists", to the detailed dissection, quotation, and parody, in the chapter on Alexander the Great, of the picture of Alexander as an idealist for world peace. The book's appeal can be gauged by the fact that CBS broadcaster Edward R. Murrow and his colleague Don Hollenbeck took turns reading from it on the air "until the announcer cracked up."

The Decline and Fall was completed and published in 1950 by Fred Feldkamp, who sifted through nearly 15,000 of Cuppy's carefully filed note cards to get the book into print within a year of his friend's death. Feldkamp also edited a second posthumous volume, a comic almanac titled How to Get from January to December, that appeared in 1951.

Cuppy's last years were marked by poor physical health and increasing depression. Facing eviction from his apartment, he took an overdose of sleeping pills and died ten days later on September 19, 1949, at St. Vincent's Hospital.

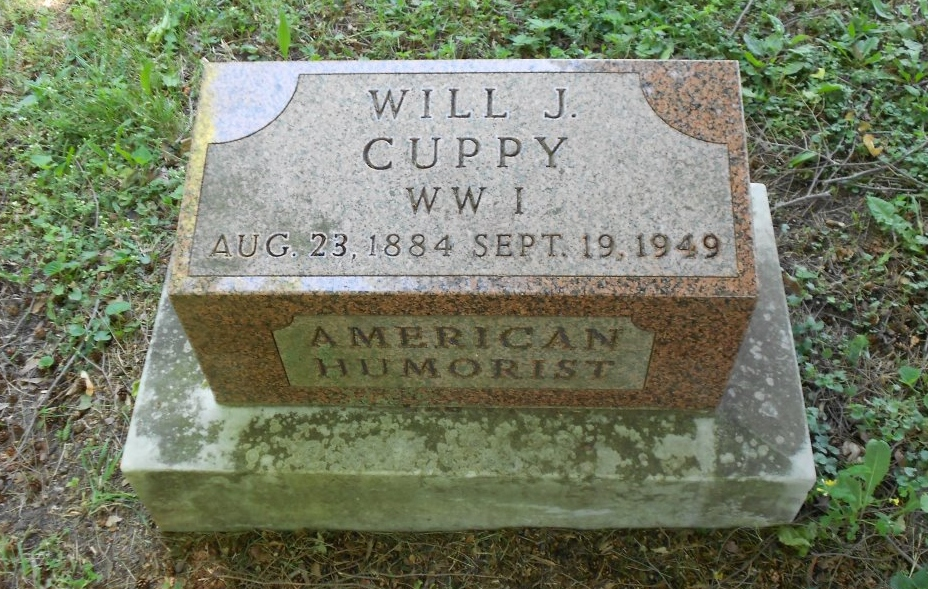
Will Cuppy's grave marker in Evergreen Cemetery in Auburn, Indiana.

Cuppy's cremated remains were returned to his hometown and buried in a grave next to his mother's in Evergreen Cemetery. His grave was unmarked until 1985, when local donors purchased a granite headstone with the inscription, "American Humorist". In 2003, Cuppy received another memorial when a committee of the International Astronomical Union approved the name "15017 Cuppy" for an asteroid. In 2019, the Indiana Historical Bureau approved placing a state historic marker at Cuppy's family home in Auburn.

Although Cuppy was reclusive and cultivated the image of a curmudgeon, he had many friends in New York's literary circles. One of them was the poet William Rose Benét (1886–1950) who, writing in the Saturday Review of Literature, penned this remembrance of him:

He had the haunted look of the true humorist. All his friends loved him.

== Cuppy documents ==
Cuppy's papers, including thousands of his notecards, are archived at the University of Chicago Library. A number of his letters to his friend and Herald Tribune colleague Isabel Paterson are among Paterson's papers archived at the Herbert Hoover Presidential Library and Museum in West Branch, Iowa. Two of Cuppy's letters to Max Eastman are among Eastman's papers at Indiana University's Lilly Library. The Frank Sullivan Collection at Cornell University also contains correspondence from Cuppy. The papers of John Towner Frederick at the University of Iowa include letters written by Cuppy in the 1940s relating to Frederick's Of Men and Books series for CBS Radio. Four letters from Cuppy to children's author Anne Carroll Moore are among her papers at the New York Public Library

== Iranian controversy ==
A Persian translation by Najaf Daryabandari of Cuppy's The Decline and Fall of Practically Everybody was published in 1972 under the title of Čenin konand bozorgān (چنین کنند بزرگان, Thus Act the Great). The good quality of the Persian prose and the fact of Cuppy's being unknown in Iran led to speculation that the book was not a translation, but an original book by Daryabandari and possibly a collaborator, who was speculated to be Ahmad Shamlou. It was guessed that this had been done in order to bypass the Pahlavi era censor. Daryabandari denied it several times, even after the Iranian Revolution. The issue was not publicly settled until the satire magazine Golagha ran an article about their "discovery" of Cuppy, which proved Daryabandari right.

== Selected bibliography ==
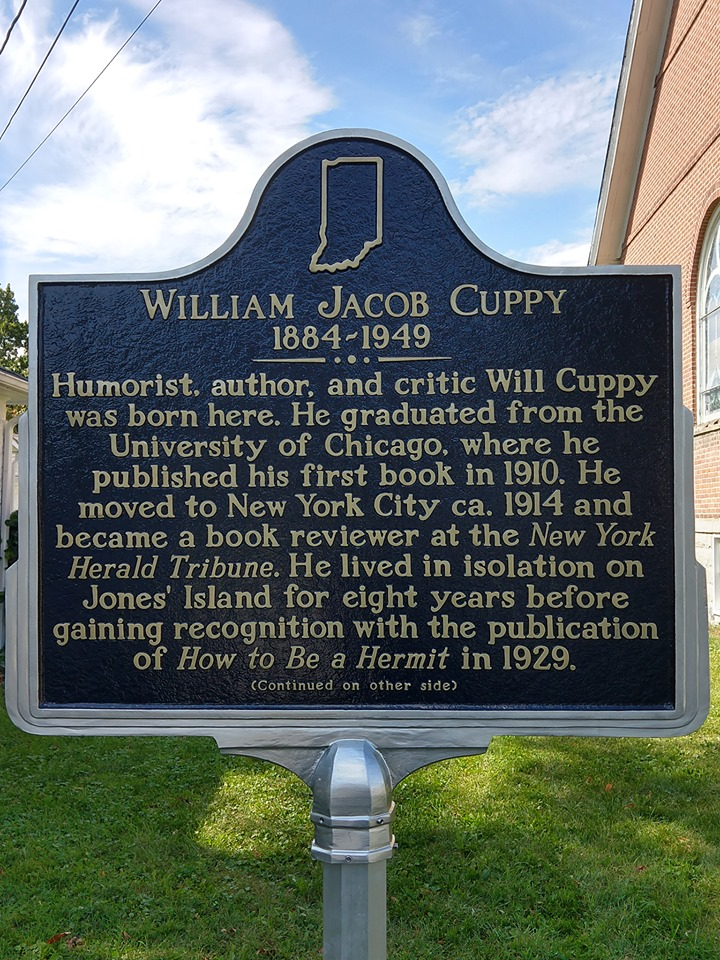
Side A of Indiana state historical marker at Will Cuppy's childhood home in Auburn, Indiana.

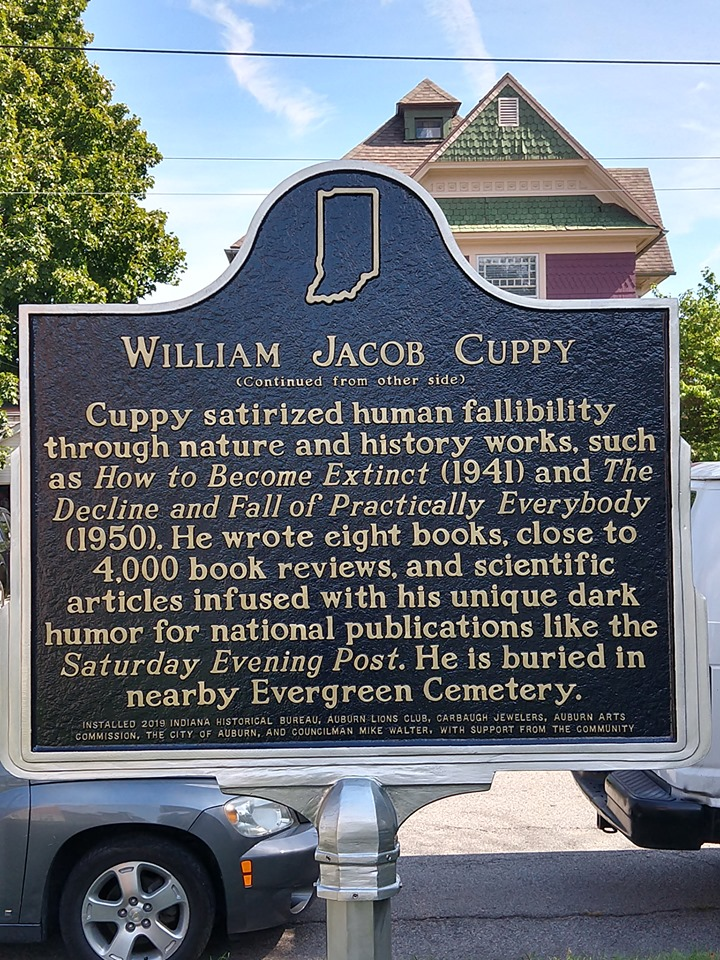
Side B of Indiana state historical marker at Will Cuppy's childhood home in Auburn Indiana.

- Books
  - (1951) How to Get from January to December, New York: Holt. Edited by Fred Feldkamp. Illustrations by John Ruge.
  - (1950) The Decline and Fall of Practically Everybody, New York: Holt. Edited by Fred Feldkamp. Illustrations by William Steig.
  - (1949) How to Attract the Wombat, New York: Rinehart. Illustrations by Ed Nofziger.
  - (1944) The Great Bustard and Other People (containing How to Tell Your Friends from the Apes and How to Become Extinct), New York : Murray Hill Books.
  - (1941) How to Become Extinct, New York: Farrar and Rinehart. Illustrations by William Steig.
  - (1931) How to Tell Your Friends from the Apes, New York: Horace Liveright, Inc. Introduction by P. G. Wodehouse. Illustrations by "Jacks."
  - (1929) How to Be a Hermit, New York: Horace Liveright.
  - (1910) Maroon Tales, Chicago: Forbes & Co..
- Books, edited
  - (1946) Murder Without Tears: An Anthology of Crime, New York: Sheridan House.
  - (1943) World's Great Detective Stories: American and English Masterpieces, New York, Cleveland: World.
  - (1943) World's Great Mystery Stories: American and English Masterpieces, New York, Cleveland: World.
- Book, contributed footnotes
  - (1937) Garden Rubbish and Other Country Bumps by W. C. Sellar and R. J. Yeatman; with footnotes by Will Cuppy. New York: Farrar & Rinehart.
- Book containing articles by Will Cuppy
  - (1948) The Home Book of Laughter, May Lamberton Becker (ed.), New York: Dodd, Mead.
- M.A. thesis completed at the University of Chicago
  - (1914) The Elizabethan Conception of Prose Style.
- Book about Will Cuppy
  - Gehring, Wes D. (2013). Will Cuppy, American Satirist. McFarland. ISBN 9780786469611.
