= Phil Chambers =

American actor (1916–1993)

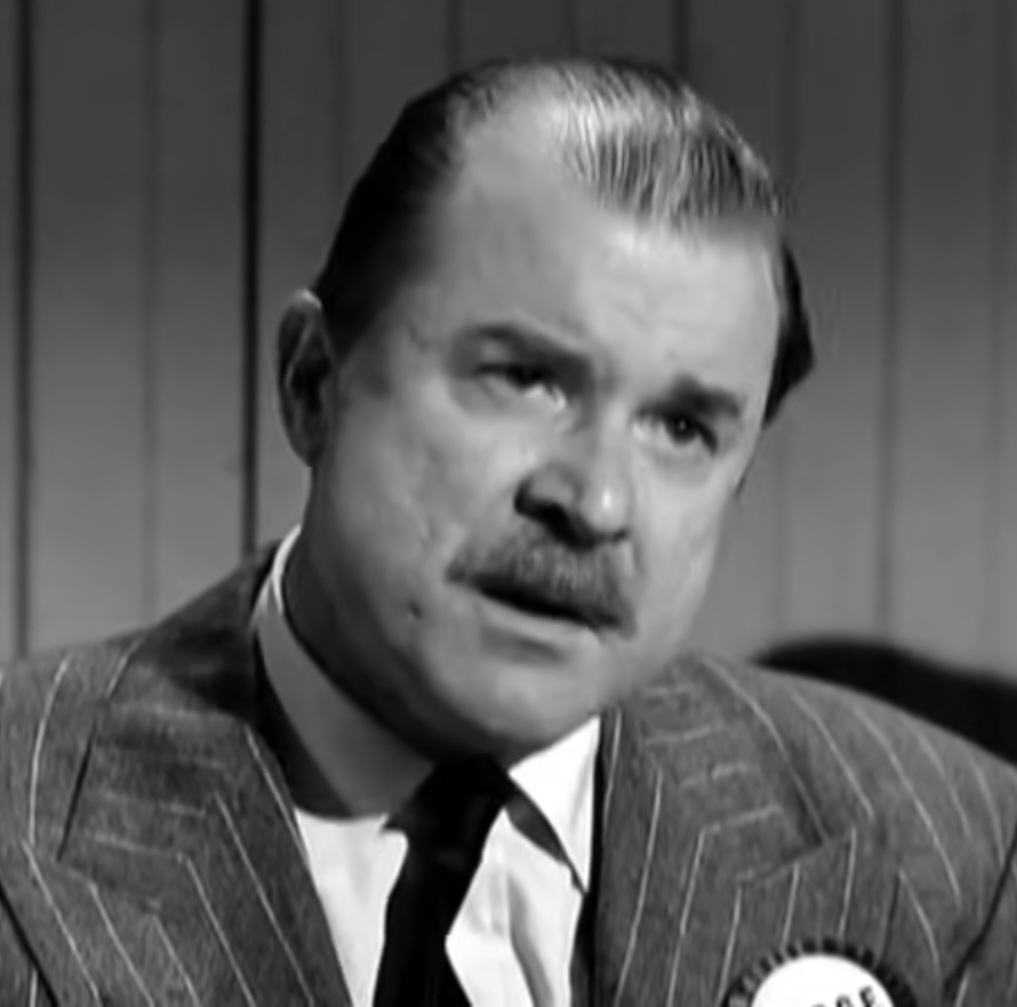
- Chambers in an episode of One Step Beyond (1959)
- Born: June 16, 1916; Los Angeles, California, U.S.
- Died: January 16, 1993 (aged 76); Los Angeles, California, U.S.
- Occupation: Actor
- Years active: 1953–1982

Phil Chambers (June 16, 1916 – January 16, 1993) was an American actor.

== Biography ==
Born in Los Angeles, California, Phil Chambers was known for his role as Sergeant Myles Magruder in the television series The Gray Ghost. Chambers died on January 16, 1993, at the age of 76. His body was cremated.

== Filmography ==
=== Film ===
- 1953: Trouble Along the Way – Bishop (uncredited)
- 1953: Code Two – Police First Sergeant (uncredited)
- 1953: Law and Order – High Light Lonas (uncredited)
- 1953: Powder River – Man with Glasses (uncredited)
- 1953: Affair with a Stranger – Poker Player (uncredited)
- 1953: The Man from the Alamo – (uncredited)
- 1953: The Big Heat – Hettrick (uncredited)
- 1953: Three Lives (Short)
- 1953: Tumbleweed – Trapper Ross
- 1954: Executive Suite – Toll Booth Attendant (uncredited)
- 1954: Overland Pacific – Weeks (uncredited)
- 1954: Riding Shotgun – Stage Station Manager (uncredited)
- 1954: Drums Across the River – Dave (uncredited)
- 1954: Pushover – Detective Briggs (uncredited)
- 1954: Rogue Cop – Det. Dirksen (uncredited)
- 1954: The Bounty Hunter – Ed
- 1954: Ricochet Romance – Mr. Daniels
- 1955: Rage at Dawn – Deputy Cortright (uncredited)
- 1955: Run for Cover – Morgan's Partner in Bank Robbery (uncredited)
- 1955: Foxfire – Mr. Riley (uncredited)
- 1955: It's a Dog's Life – Carney (uncredited)
- 1956: Backlash – Deputy Sheriff Dobbs
- 1956: A Day of Fury – Burson
- 1956: The Mole People – Dr. Paul Stuart
- 1957: Drango – Luke
- 1957: Will Success Spoil Rock Hunter? – Mailman (uncredited)
- 1957: Man on Fire – Roberts (uncredited)
- 1957: Raintree County – Starter (uncredited)
- 1959: Good Day for a Hanging – Deputy William Avery
- 1959: A Summer Place – Sheriff (uncredited)
- 1962: Six Black Horses – Undertaker
- 1963: For Love or Money – Captain of Crab Boat (uncredited)
- 1967: Warning Shot – Gardener (uncredited)

=== Television ===
- 1954 - Lassie (Jeff's Collie) - S1E3 "The Colt" - the doctor
- 1955 to 1975: Gunsmoke – Farmer / Stage Driver / Beckwith / Shotgun / 2nd Stage Man / Ned Shields / Hugo
- 1957: Wagon Train S1, E2 "The Jean Lebec Story"
- 1957–1958: The Gray Ghost – Sgt. Myles Magruder
- 1959: Bat Masterson – Town Sheriff
- 1962–1969: Bonanza – 15 episodes as Store Owner S6 E21 "The Search" 1965 / Webster / Wooley / Abner / Shopkeeper / Seth Hubbell / Sam / Anderson / Mr. Tindle / Abe / Mr. Amos – Store Owner / Assay Clerk / Austin / Dick Thompson
- 1963: The Twilight Zone (Episode: "The New Exhibit") – Gas Man
- 1973: Kung Fu – Mackey
- 1974: The Strange and Deadly Occurrence (TV Movie) – Coroner
- 1979: The Rockford Files – Old Man
- 1979: B. J. and the Bear – Jack Peterson
- 1981: Little House on the Prairie – Mr. Matlock

Gunsmoke called “The Raid” (S11E19) along with actors John Anderson, Michael Conrad, Jim Davis, Richard Jaeckel & Gary Lockwood.
