= Operation Manhunt =

1954 film

- Theatrical release poster
- Directed by: Jack Alexander
- Written by: Paul Monash
- Produced by: Fred Feldkamp
- Starring: Harry Townes; Irja Jensen; Jacques Aubuchon; Robert Goodier; Albert Miller; Caren Shaffer
- Cinematography: Akos Farkas; Benoit Jobin
- Edited by: Benoit Jobin
- Music by: Jack Shaindlin
- Production company: Fred Feldkamp Productions
- Distributed by: United Artists
- Release date: October 4, 1954
- Running time: 77 minutes
- Country: United States
- Language: English

Operation Manhunt is a 1954 American drama film directed by Jack Alexander and written by Paul Monash. The film stars Harry Townes, Irja Jensen, Jacques Aubuchon, Robert Goodier, Albert Miller and Caren Shaffer. It is a fictionalized story about the aftermath of the defection of Igor Gouzenko, a former Soviet cipher clerk who revealed the operations of Soviet agents on Canadian soil. The film was released on October 4, 1954, by United Artists.

== Plot ==
In September 1945, Igor Gouzenko, a cryptography clerk at the Soviet embassy in Ottawa, has defected with top secret documents regarding an extensive Soviet espionage network in Canada, in exchange for asylum with new identities for himself and his family (his wife Katya, and his children Jean and Stephen). However, the Gouzenkos - now living in Quebec under the assumed name Mielick - live in constant fear of retaliation from their former countrymen. Gouzenko has been writing a novel about his work for the Soviets, with Victor Collier of the Montreal publishing house Collier & Grant willing to publicize the manuscript despite Soviet spies (one of them being Collier's own secretary) attempting to follow his trail back to Gouzenko.

About nine years later, Soviet embassy agent Chertok receives Volov, a KGB agent using the guise of an assistant clerk. The embassy's chief military attaché, Colonel Rostovich, tasks Volov with liquidating Gouzenko to quell further defections by Soviet officials to the West. Volov poses as a potential defector and sends a letter to Gouzenko via Collier & Grant to ask for a meeting with him. Gouzenko meets with Collier at the Mt. Royal Hotel to discuss this, but as Collier leaves his office, he is followed by Soviet agents to the hotel, where they lose his trail due to Gouzenko having coded his suite number in his call with Collier. Upon seeing the message, Gouzenko decides to respond, but suspecting a trap, he consults Inspector Boucher of the Canadian police in the matter.

Upon getting the answer, the Soviets prepare their trap, at the same time cancelling any further attempts to track Gouzenko in order to lull him into a false sense of security. However, Gouzenko learns from Boucher about the discrepancies in Volov's story, and Boucher agrees to assist him "unofficially". Collier pressures Volov to meet him at Morgan's Department Store first, where Volov impatiently demands another meeting the next day with Gouzenko himself in Montreal. Despite his growing misgivings about Volov, Gouzenko decides to go.

The next day, Rostovich sends off Volov and Chertok to catch Gouzenko, holding a threat against their wives over their heads as an insurance against dissention. At the meeting place, a crowded market, Gouzenko follows Volov through the throng of people, as agreed, and over the Jacques Cartier Bridge to Saint Helen's Island. Once in the seclusion of the island's park, the ambush is sprung; but instead of killing Gouzenko, Volov, having had a change of heart since his army service in World War II and having since plotted his own defection, gives him a list of Soviet spies still operating in Canada, and Chertok is arrested by Boucher.

In an aftermath scene, the real Igor Gouzenko, his face hidden, addresses the audience, personally emphasizing the danger Soviet defectors face from their former government and expressing hope that one day these persecutions will finally cease.

== Cast ==
- Harry Townes as Igor Gouzenko/Peter Mielick
- Irja Jensen as Katya Gouzenko
- Jacques Aubuchon as Volov
- Robert Goodier as Victor Collier
- Albert Miller as Chertok
- Caren Shaffer as Jean Gouzenko
- Kenneth Wolfe as Stephen Gouzenko
- Will Kuluva as Rostovich
- Ovila Légaré as Inspector Boucher
- Igor Gouzenko as himself

== Production ==
The film was filmed mostly on location in Montreal, Sainte-Adèle, and Saint Helen's Island.
