= The Spiral Road =

1962 film by Robert Mulligan

- Directed by: Robert Mulligan
- Screenplay by: John Lee Mahir; Neil Paterson
- Based on: the novel by Jan de Hartog
- Produced by: Robert Arthur
- Starring: Rock Hudson; Burl Ives; Gena Rowlands; Geoffrey Keen
- Cinematography: Russell Harlan
- Edited by: Russell F. Schoengarth
- Music by: Jerry Goldsmith
- Color process: Eastmancolor
- Production company: Universal Pictures
- Distributed by: Universal International
- Release date: August 3, 1962 (New York City)
- Running time: 140 minutes
- Country: United States
- Language: English
- Box office: $2 million (US/Canada)

The Spiral Road is a 1962 American adventure-drama film directed by Robert Mulligan and starring Rock Hudson, Burl Ives, Gena Rowlands, and Geoffrey Keen, based on the novel of the same name by Jan de Hartog. The film was released by Universal-International in the United States in 1962, the same year that Mulligan's other movie To Kill a Mockingbird became a critical and commercial success.

The movie was filmed in Suriname and was shot in Eastmancolor.

== Plot ==
Dr. Anton Drager travels to Java to study the effects of leprosy under an expert on the subject, Dr. Brits Jansen. The two physicians have many of the same views scientifically, but are philosophically a mismatch because of Drager's atheism and Jansen's Christianity.

After being married to his sweetheart Els, Drager must trek into the jungle to track down Frolick, a drunken river master who is lost. Frolick has been driven mad by a shaman called Burubi. Drager eventually comes across Frolick, but ends up killing him in self-defense.

After rescuing another doctor, in the same region, Drager becomes lost in the wild. He nearly dies and has lapsed into a coma by the time he is rescued. Drager's ordeal comes to change his perceptions, turning him into a Christian.

== Cast ==
- Rock Hudson as Dr. Anton Drager
- Burl Ives as Dr. Brits Jansen
- Gena Rowlands as Els Van Duin
- Geoffrey Keen as Willem Wattereus
- Neva Patterson as Louise Kramer
- Will Kuluva as Dr. Sordjano
- Philip Abbott as Harry Frolick
- Larry Gates as Dr. Kramer
- Karl Swenson as Inspector Bevers
- Edgar Stehli as The Sultan
- Judy Dan as Laja
- Robert F. Simon as Dr. Martens
- Ibrahim Pendek as Stegomyia (as Ibrahim Bin Hassan)
- Reggie Nalder as Burubi
- Leon Lontoc as Dr. Hatta
- David Lewis as Maj. Vlormans
- Parley Baer as Mr. Boosmans
- Fredd Wayne as Van Bloor
- Leslie Bradley as Krasser
- Barbara Morrison as Mrs. Boosmans
- Martin Brandt as Dr. Sander

== Reception ==
While many critics and audiences were impressed with the setting and scenery of the film, there was general consensus that the script was lacking and that Mulligan's other films, particularly To Kill a Mockingbird, were better.

Michael E. Grost of Classic Film and Television wrote: "Weird but wildly inventive tale of doctors in the jungle, with good visuals."

== Home media ==
Universal released this film on DVD in 2006 as part of the Rock Hudson Screen Legend Collection, a three-disc set featuring four other films (Has Anybody Seen My Gal, A Very Special Favor, The Golden Blade, and The Last Sunset). Universal then re-released this film in 2015 as a stand-alone DVD as part of its Universal Vault Series. There is also a Region 2 DVD release of this film.

== See also ==
- List of American films of 1962
