= Marcel Hillaire =

German actor (1908–1988)

- Born: Erwin Ottmar Hiller; April 23, 1908; Cologne, Germany
- Died: January 1, 1988 (aged 79); Los Angeles, California, U.S.
- Occupation: Actor
- Years active: 1952–1987
- Relatives: Ferdinand Hiller, grandfather

Marcel Hillaire (born Erwin Ottmar Hiller; April 23, 1908 – January 1, 1988) was a German-born character actor who had a lengthy career, appearing on stage, in films and on television. Hillaire was recognizable by his gaunt appearance and his accent, which seemed to be a combination of French and German.

Of Jewish descent, Hillaire first evaded the Holocaust in Nazi Germany by adopting a stage name and moving around constantly in traveling theater troupes; later he brazenly entered the bureaucracy of the Todt under his birth name, narrowly avoiding execution after capture. After World War II, Hillaire emigrated to America, again changed his name, and adopted a French persona, even touring the United States in a one-man stage show dedicated to celebrating French culture. In the early days of American television Hillaire guest starred in over a hundred episodes of various series, usually playing a Frenchman. In American films, Hillaire played the French chef training Audrey Hepburn's eponymous Sabrina and was featured as Fritz the director in Woody Allen's mockumentary Take the Money and Run.

== Heritage and early life ==
Hillaire's grandfather was Ferdinand Hiller, a Frankfurt-born pianist and music educator, a student of the Austro-Hungarian composer virtuoso Johann Nepomuk Hummel, himself a student of Mozart. Under Hummel's tutelage, Hiller met many members of Germany's creative community including Felix Mendelssohn and Johann Wolfgang von Goethe.

Through Hummel, Hiller met Ludwig van Beethoven just days before the legendary composer's death and, with the permission of Hummel, who was playing at Beethoven's funeral, clipped a lock of hair from Beethoven's corpse. Before the elder Hiller died, he gave the Beethoven keepsake as a birthday present to his son, Cologne opera singer and music critic Paul Hiller.

Erwin Hiller was born to Paul Hiller and his wife Sophie Lion in Cologne in 1908; the son was partly Jewish on both father's and mother's sides. Paul Hiller wrote for 24 years as the music critic of Cologne's Rheinische Zeitung, "reviewing over the course of a quarter century virtually every operatic and orchestral performance scheduled throughout the lower Rheinland." Erwin and his brother were exposed to music and the arts from their earliest days, and by the father's death in 1934, Erwin was well-established as an actor and a Lothario.

== Hiding in Nazi Germany ==
While his brother Edgar fled to neutral Switzerland, Erwin took up the stage name Harry Fuerster or Fürster and began to tour Germany in a traveling theater company. Then, using romantic associations made during his touring, Erwin Hiller, under his own name, became a clerk in Organization Todt, Nazi Germany's civil and military engineering corps. Stationed in Brittany, Hiller rose to a position directly under the supervision of Albert Speer and in 1942 used his connections to attempt to bring his dying mother, still living in Cologne, to the comparative safety of France.

Three years later, while he was still working for the Todt in Germany, Hiller's Jewish heritage was revealed. Sentenced to death for "his insidious deceit as much as his Semitic ancestry", Hiller awaited execution in a Weimar jail, but was transferred to a Berlin prison to face six-year-old statutory rape charges made before the war by the mother of a teenaged admirer. In April 1945, the Russian army liberated Berlin and Hiller was released from custody.

== Career in New York ==
Hiller emigrated from Germany to the United States on June 15, 1948, arriving in New York City and taking jobs in restaurants while he looked for work as an actor. Shortly after coming to America, Hiller decided that his German birth might hinder his prospects in the entertainment industry, so he changed his identity one last time: to Marcel Hillaire, a Frenchman. He never used his birth name again in public.

Hillaire found employment portraying European characters in Manhattan theater productions and in the budding television industry's New York studios. He appeared in three 1952 episodes of the Goodyear Playhouse and five episodes of the Lux Video Theatre by 1953. The same year, Hillaire guested in one of the first situation comedies, The Goldbergs. When Billy Wilder cast his 1954 Sabrina starring Audrey Hepburn, William Holden and Humphrey Bogart, Hillaire, in his first film role, was chosen to portray a French master chef.

While still in New York, Hillaire appeared in two Broadway productions. He played opposite Jean-Pierre Aumont in the play The Heavenly Twins, adapted from a French comedy by Albert Husson. From February 1955 until April 1956 Hillaire had a featured role in the original cast of the Cole Porter musical Silk Stockings.

== The "essence of all Frenchmen" ==
After moving to Los Angeles, Hillaire continued to portray Europeans, mostly Frenchmen, in television episodes and movies. Beginning in the late fifties, Hillaire took a one-man touring show, entitled The Smile of France, to college campuses across the U.S.

In speaking to town newspapers about upcoming performances, Hillaire told reporters he was born in the Ménilmontant neighborhood of Paris, the son of circus performers, who worked at the Folies Bergère, and was trained as an actor by French theater legends Louis Jouvet and Sacha Guitry. Hillaire adopted the sobriquet "the essence of all Frenchmen" and told reporters he had been acclaimed "Le Bien-Aimé du Peuple Français" (The Well-Beloved of the French People).

While performing at the Library of Congress's Coolidge Auditorium, one of Hillaire's early shows was recorded for library archives and included works from François Villon, Guy de Maupassant, Pierre de Ronsard, and Guillaume Apollinaire, plus readings from love letters by Napoléon Bonaparte, Jeanne Bécu du Barry, and Louis XV. Later performances added works from authors Jean de La Fontaine, Colette, Voltaire, Marcel Pagnol, and Sacha Guitry.

== Later career ==
From the early 1950s to the 1980s, he played character parts in various TV shows, including The Twilight Zone (episodes "A Most Unusual Camera" and "The New Exhibit"), Lost in Space, Get Smart, The Man from U.N.C.L.E., McCloud and I Spy. He appeared as a director in Woody Allen's second film, Take the Money and Run (1969). Marcel Hillaire played a role in Combat (Season 3 Episode 12, "A Rare Vintage", in 1964).

== Filmography ==
Year	Title	Role	Notes
1954	Sabrina	The Professor	
1959	It Happened to Jane	Chef	Uncredited
1960	The Twilight Zone	Waiter	Episode: A Most Unusual Camera
1960	Seven Thieves	Duc di Salins	
1960	North to Alaska	Jenny's Husband - 'Butler'	Uncredited
1961	The Honeymoon Machine	Inspector of casino games	
1962	Four Horsemen of the Apocalypse	Armand Dibier	
1962	Bon Voyage!	Sewer Guide	
1963	The Twilight Zone	Museum Guide	Episode: The New Exhibit
1963	Take Her, She's Mine	Policeman	
1963	The Wheeler Dealers	Giuseppe - Maitre d'	
1963	McHale's Navy	Gerard	Episode: The Big Raffle
1963	McHale's Navy	Emile Gerard	Episode: One Enchanted Weekend
1964	Wild and Wonderful	Inspector Duvivier	
1964	What a Way to Go!	French Lawyer	Uncredited
1964	McHale's Navy (movie)	Chief de Gendarmes	
1964	Combat!	Jean Sebelleau	Episode: A Rare Vintage
1965	The Art of Love	Executioner	
1965	A Very Special Love	Claude - French Barrister	
1966	Made in Paris	Attendant	
1966	The Time Tunnel	Prisoner Boudaire, on Devil's Island	
1966	Murderers' Row	Police Capt. Deveraux	
1967	Monkeys, Go Home!	Mayor Gaston Lou	
1968	Lost in Space	Phanzig	Episode: Condemned of Space
1968	Lost in Space	the Junkman	Episode: Junkyard in Space
1969	Take the Money and Run	Fritz - Director	
1971	Bayou Boy	M. Verret	
1978	Evening in Byzantium	Inspector Le Dioux	
