= The Silken Affair =

1956 British film by Roy Kellino

- Directed by: Roy Kellino
- Written by: Robert Lewis Taylor
- Story by: John McCarten
- Produced by: Fred Feldkamp
- Starring: David Niven
- Cinematography: Gilbert Taylor
- Edited by: Richard Best
- Music by: Peggy Stuart
- Production company: Dragon Films
- Distributed by: RKO Radio Pictures (UK); Distributors Corporation of America (US)
- Release dates: 2 October 1956 (London, UK); 2 September 1957 (US)
- Running time: 96 minutes
- Country: United Kingdom
- Language: English
- Budget: $500,000

The Silken Affair is a 1956 British romantic comedy film directed by Roy Kellino and starring David Niven, Geneviève Page, Wilfrid Hyde-White, Joan Sims, Irene Handl and Ronald Squire. It was written by Robert Lewis Taylor from a story by John McCarten.

== Plot ==
Aan accountant is creative with his firm's books and uses the money to fund a romantic spree.

== Cast ==
- David Niven as Roger Tweakham
- Geneviève Page as Genevieve Gerard
- Ronald Squire as Marberry
- Beatrice Straight as Theora
- Wilfrid Hyde-White as Sir Horace Hogg
- Howard Marion-Crawford as Baggott
- Dorothy Alison as Mrs. Tweakham
- Miles Malleson as Mr. Blucher
- Richard Wattis as Worthington
- Joan Sims as Lady Barber
- Irene Handl as receptionist
- Charles Carson as judge
- Harry Locke as tobacconist
- Martin Boddey as detective

== Critical reception ==
The Monthly Film Bulletin wrote: "Failing to strike a satisfactory balance between comedy, farce and fantasy, The Silken Affair moves jerkily through a series of episodes devised with little regard for coherence or comic relevance. Firmer handling might have given the film a sharper outline, but Roy Kellino's direction is one-paced, and the attempts at gay irresponsibility too often fall off into heavy facetiousness. David Niven plays quite amiably, Genevieve Page is tirelessly arch as the French heroine, and Beatrice Straight, as an uncompromising feminist armed with a shotgun, handles a grimly unamusing part with some discretion."

Variety wrote: " As an essay in farcical comedy, The Silken Affair is a near miss. Pic is Fred Feldkamp's first excursion into British production. Although he has fashioned a yarn with many amusing situations, it's a long way from hitting the jackpot, with b.o. prospects around average. Robert Lewis Taylor's screenplay never pretends to he more than a lightweight, frothy trifle, in which individual laughlines appear to take precedence over story construction. The plot itself makes little sense, and much of the incident falls flat. Occasionally, however, there's a smart dialog passage to give it a shot in the arm."

In the Radio Times, David McGillivray called it a "frivolous romantic comedy," in which, "the theme was exploited much more effectively 20 years later in Jonathan Demme's Something Wild."

TV Guide wrote, "This film tries to be a light, stylish British comedy in the sophisticated manner that is one of Britain's best exports; however, the plot is too implausible and the script doesn't give the actors much to work with. The direction compensates somewhat in a handsome looking production. The cast does give it their all, with Niven in his usual witty performance and international leading lady Page as the love interest, winning kudos from the critics for her debut in English films".
