= The Midland (magazine) =

Regional little magazine in the United States (1915–1933)

- Editor: John T. Frederick (1915–1933); Frank Luther Mott (1925–1930)
- Categories: Regional magazine; Literary magazine
- Frequency: Monthly; Bimonthly
- Founder: John T. Frederick
- Founded: 1915
- First issue: January 1915
- Final issue: May–June 1933
- Country: United States
- Based in: Iowa City; Moorhead, Minnesota; Glennie, Michigan; Pittsburgh; Chicago
- Language: English
- ISSN: 0026-3249
- OCLC: 1757420

The Midland was a regional little magazine which was published between 1915 and 1933 in the United States. Its subtitle was A Magazine of the Middle West between its start in 1915 and 1929. Then it was changed as A National Literary Magazine which was used until its closure in 1933. It was the most significant regional little magazine of the period.

== History and profile ==
The Midland was launched in 1915, and the first issue appeared in January that year. Its publisher was John Springer from Economy Advertising Company. John T. Frederick was both the founder and the sole editor of the magazine which featured essays and fiction written by local authors. From 1925 to 1930, Frank Luther Mott served as its coeditor. The magazine was instrumental in making the Midland literary work independent of the influence of the Eastern states. It gained a considerable prestige due to its focus on regionalism, different perspectives towards literary work, and local, national and global issues that were significant for its readers.

During its lifetime the frequency of The Midland was changed several times: monthly (1915–1917; 1923–1927), bimonthly (1918–1919; 1928–1933) and monthly and bimonthly (1920–1922). The magazine was launched in Iowa City, but in 1917 its headquarters moved to Moorhead, Minnesota. From 1919 to 1921, it was published in Glennie, Missouri, and from 1922 to 1923 its headquarters was in Pittsburgh. Then The Midland was based in Chicago. The magazine ceased publication with the issue dated May–June 1933. In November 1933, it merged with Frontier to establish Frontier and Midland magazine.
