= The New Exhibit =

- The Twilight Zone episode
- Episode no.: Season 4 Episode 13
- Directed by: John Brahm
- Written by: Jerry Sohl (credited to Charles Beaumont)
- Production code: 4866
- Original air date: April 4, 1963

Guest appearances
- Martin Balsam; Will Kuluva; Maggie Mahoney; William Mims; Marcel Hillaire; Milton Parsons; David Bond; Billy Beck; Phil Chambers; Bob Mitchell; Robert McCord

Episode chronology
← Previous "I Dream of Genie"	Next → "Of Late I Think of Cliffordville"
- The Twilight Zone (1959 TV series) (season 4)

"The New Exhibit" is an episode of the American television anthology series The Twilight Zone. In this episode a museum worker (played by Martin Balsam) takes a set of wax figures into his home, where they begin to show the homicidal tendencies of the famous murderers they depict.

== Opening narration ==
Martin Lombard Senescu, a gentle man, the dedicated curator of murderers' row in Ferguson's Wax Museum. He ponders the reasons why ordinary men are driven to commit mass murder. What Mr. Senescu does not know is that the groundwork has already been laid for his own special kind of madness and torment found only in the Twilight Zone.

== Plot ==
Martin Senescu works at a wax museum as curator of its "Murderers Row" exhibit. His boss and best friend, Ernest Ferguson, informs him that he has decided to sell the museum due to a long-term decline in attendance and his desire to retire. The new owners are planning to demolish the building and construct a supermarket in its place. Martin, dispirited and desperate to save the Murderers Row figures - Jack the Ripper, Albert W. Hicks, Henri Désiré Landru, William Burke and William Hare - volunteers to keep them at his house until a buyer can be found for them.

Martin's wife, Emma, becomes frustrated at having the figures in their basement. They require an air conditioner to keep from melting, and due to the hot weather, the resultant electric bills quickly wipe out their savings. Martin makes only perfunctory efforts at finding a buyer for the figures, instead spending most of his time tending to them. Emma is disconcerted by this, especially when he begins talking about and to them as if they were alive. Her brother, Dave, advises her to shut off the air conditioning so that the figures will melt. After one last effort to convince Martin to return the figures to Ferguson's care, Emma sneaks out of bed one night and goes down to the basement. When she tries to shut off the air conditioner, the Jack the Ripper figure stabs her.

The next morning, Martin discovers Emma dead and her blood on Jack's knife. Realizing no one will believe a wax figure killed Emma, he buries her under the basement floor. The next day, Dave pays a visit. Martin nervously claims to have gotten rid of the wax figures, which arouses Dave's suspicions when he hears the air conditioner hum and finds the basement door locked. When he presses Martin further about Emma's whereabouts, Martin rushes him out of the house. Dave then sneaks into the basement through the back entrance. While he is examining the area, the Hicks figure strikes Dave with its axe. Martin comes down later to find the carnage.

A few weeks later, Ferguson comes by to tell Martin that he has sold the figures to Marchand's Wax Museum in Brussels. However, Martin is still reluctant to give up the wax figures he has so greatly cared for. While he goes upstairs and makes tea, Ferguson takes measurements of the figures for the buyer. When he makes a passing remark about Landru's width, the latter strangles him. Martin comes downstairs with the tea and finds Ferguson's body. Deeming this the last straw, Martin rebukes the figures and grabs a crowbar, planning to smash them. Suddenly, the wax figures come off their pedestals and advance on him, claiming he murdered Emma, Dave, and Ferguson even though he was not in the basement when any of them died. Martin screams as the figures close in.

Sometime later, at Marchand's, the five murderer figures are now accompanied by a wax figure of Martin, whom the curator describes as "a remarkable and certainly most versatile murderer" for killing each of his victims in a different way.

== Closing narration ==
The new exhibit became very popular at Marchand's, but of all the figures none was ever regarded with more dread than that of Martin Lombard Senescu. It was something about the eyes, people said. It's the look that one often gets after taking a quick walk through the Twilight Zone.

== Cast ==
- Martin Balsam as Martin Lombard Senescu
- Will Kuluva as Ernest Ferguson
- Maggie Mahoney as Emma Senescu
- William Mims as Dave
- Marcel Hillaire as Guide
- Milton Parsons as Henri Désiré Landru
- David Bond as Jack the Ripper
- Billy Beck as William Hare
- Phil Chambers as Gas Man
- Bob Mitchell as Albert W. Hicks
- Robert McCord as William Burke
