= Albert W. Hicks =

19th-century American pirate

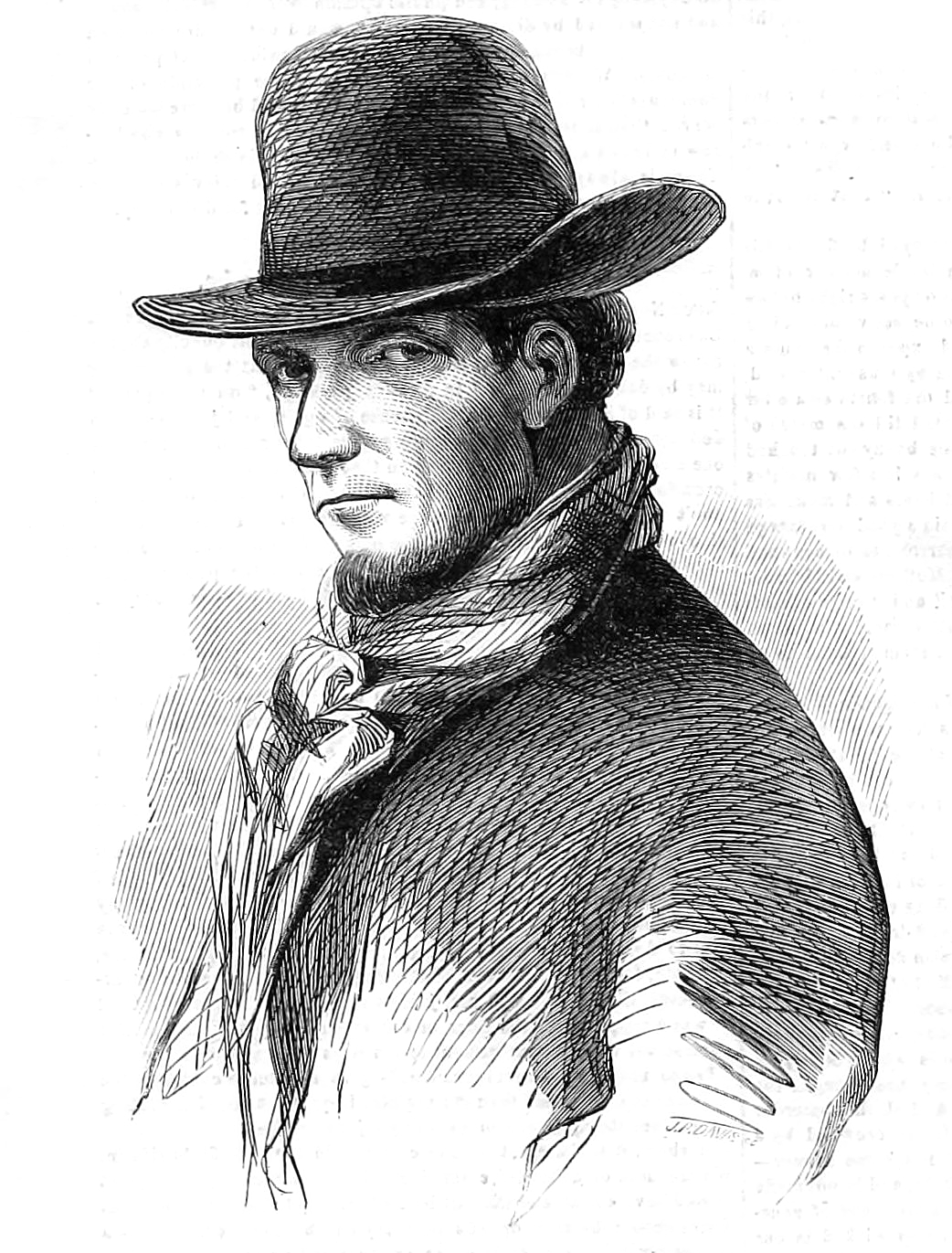
- Hicks in Frank Leslie's Illustrated Newspaper, 1860
- Born: c. 1820; Foster, Rhode Island, U.S.
- Died: July 13, 1860 (age 39–40); Bedloe's Island, New York, U.S.
- Cause of death: Execution by hanging
- Occupations: Thief, murderer, mutineer, pirate
- Children: 1
- Conviction: Piracy
- Penalty: Death

Albert W. Hicks (c. 1820 – July 13, 1860, also known as Elias W. Hicks, William Johnson, John Hicks, and Pirate Hicks) was a triple murderer and one of the last people executed for piracy in the United States. Cultural historian Rich Cohen places him as the first New York City legendary gangster figure, a bridge between the piracy of old and the rise of a new "gangster nation".

== Biography ==
According to Hicks' testimony, he was born around 1820 in Foster, Rhode Island. His father was a farmer who had seven sons, of whom Hicks was the second youngest. He was known to be headstrong and a fighter. He never attended school and worked on the farm until age 15 when he ran away to Norwich, Connecticut, where he began a life of crime. Arrested for theft, he was put into jail. Biographer Rich Cohen suggests it wouldn't have been uncommon for a teenage runaway to be "buggered" by older inmates. Hicks escaped a number of times but he was re-apprehended and given increasingly severe sentences, including a year in solitary where Hicks said he "went a little crazy." He swore vengeance "against the whole human race."

By Hicks' own account, he spent the next 20 years committing many crimes, including murder in the gold fields of California, throughout South America, Mexico, the South Pacific, and the Atlantic trade triangle. Ship mutinies and highway robberies were his main occupation. It is possible that Hicks killed hundreds of people. He and an accomplice typically killed their victims and stayed on the move, spending their ill-gotten earnings on alcohol, prostitutes, and fine clothes until the money ran out. He was a known raconteur, and when his confessions were published, The New York Times raised some doubt about their accuracy, but modern biographer Rich Cohen said there was evidence to support at least some of the stories.

Hicks eventually ended up in New York City, at the age of 40, with a newly married wife who knew nothing of his criminal past and a young child to support. Needing money for his family he again turned to crime.

== Murder on the A.E. Johnson ==
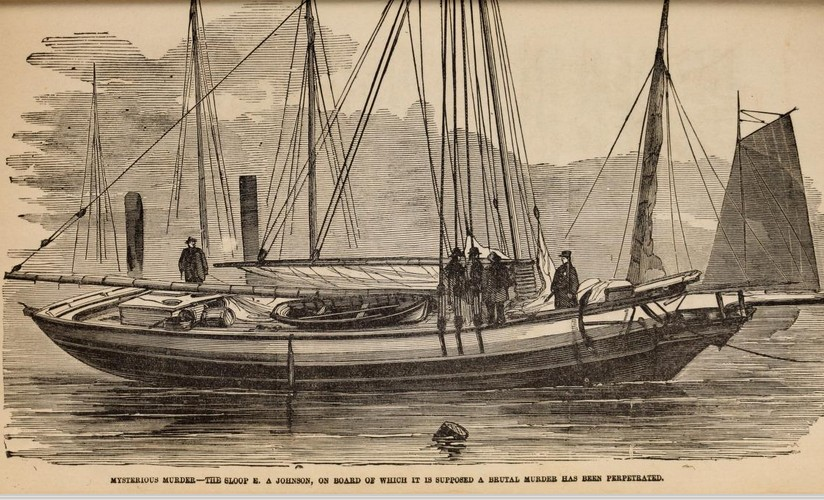
Sloop A.E. Johnson

Hicks was hired on as a deck hand with the oyster sloop A.E. Johnson out of New York City, which he knew to be carrying a large amount of cash for buying oysters in Virginia to be transported back to New York. There were four men on the boat, including Captain George H. Burr, brothers Oliver and Smith Watts, and Hicks.

It was nighttime as the boat neared the "Narrows". Captain Burr and Oliver retired to their quarters to sleep. Smith had night duty and Hicks joined him on deck, politely taking a turn on the wheel. Hicks saw something and pointed it out to Smith asking what it was. Smith didn't see anything. Hicks said look again. Smith turned his back. Hicks grabbed a sea axe and struck a blow to the back of Smith's head, felling him to the deck. Hearing the commotion, Oliver Watts stuck his neck out through the cabin hatchway. Hicks struck again, decapitating Watts. Hicks recalled that the body slowly sagged downward and the head rolled onto the deck, now sprayed with the blood of two brothers.

Hicks carried the bloodied axe into Captain Burr's cabin, who was by now alert. The Captain was a tall, strong man and the ensuing fight lasted a while, with Burr almost strangling Hicks to death. Eventually Hicks managed to slash the captain with the axe, slicing off half his face, including an eyeball and nose left hanging on the axe blade. Exhausted from the struggle of killing Burr, Hicks searched the living quarters for loot.

Unbeknownst to Hicks, Smith Watts had survived the blow, and when Hicks returned onto deck, he was shocked to see Smith on his feet moving towards him; he believed it might be an apparition. Hicks forced the injured man overboard, but Smith managed to grab and hang onto a rail. Hicks swung the axe and chopped off his fingers, which fell onto the deck, and Smith fell into the water. Hicks threw the other bodies and the axe overboard.

The A.E. Johnson had been running unattended and struck another ship, the schooner J. R. Mather, breaking the Johnson's main mast and bringing down her rigging. Hicks set out to sink the Johnson, along with the evidence of the killings, by drilling holes through the keel. He then took the money, about $230, and the possessions of the murdered crew and abandoned ship in a yawl, rowing for shore and landing about daybreak next to a farmer's field on Staten Island just above Fort Richmond (Battery Weed). Believing that he would not be caught, he made his way back home to Manhattan, stopping at saloons merrily drinking and making a spectacle of himself.

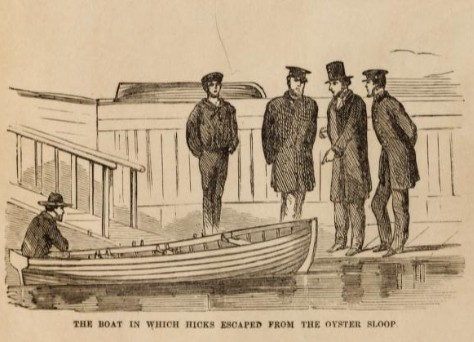
Yawl used by Albert W. Hicks discovered by police detectives

When the abandoned but still afloat A.E. Johnson was discovered the next day by the coast guard, they found the deck and cabin bathed in blood, including inexplicably a set of severed fingers. The city was shocked by the gruesome scene and intrigued by the mystery of what happened. Police detectives could see that a yawl was missing and began a search for it. After a few days a local boy led them to where it had been abandoned in some rushes. They began following a chain of witnesses who had seen a strange man carrying a large heavy sea bag. The detectives followed witness sightings all the way back to an apartment in Manhattan.

Hicks learned the police were on his trail through newspaper reports and fled the city. Detectives had by now determined Hicks' identity, and they continued to follow a chain of witnesses who remembered a large man with a wife and small child taking trains and boats northward. When police found the last witness to see him, a cabbie who took Hicks to a boarding home outside Providence, Rhode Island, they surrounded the house in the middle of the night and took him captive in bed without a fight. They found in his possession Captain Burr's watch, several money bags, and a daguerreotype belonging to Watts, among other damning evidence.

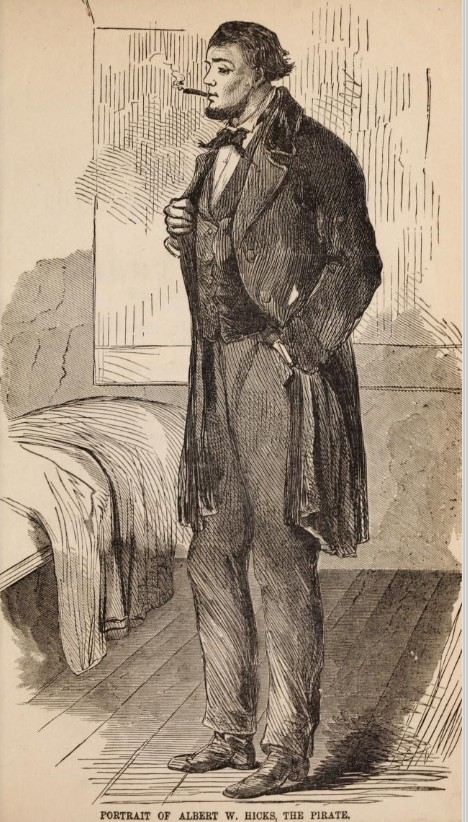
Portrait of Hicks (1860). "He was handsome, tall and broad shouldered with menacing black eyes."

== Trial and execution ==
Hicks was put on trial and was sensationalized by the city press. The physical evidence of his guilt was overwhelming and the defense made little effective rebuttal. The jury deliberated for about seven minutes before returning a guilty verdict. The judge ordered him to be hanged until dead. After the trial, Hicks gave a full confession of the murders and his life story which was published as a book on the day of his execution. Hicks gave his reason "...the devil took possession of me."

He was executed by hanging on Friday July 13, 1860, on Bedloe's Island (now known as Liberty Island). An estimated ten thousand people viewed the event from boats anchored in New York Bay. Hicks was dressed in a blue suit he had acquired specifically for the occasion. As a newspaper described, "His coat was rather fancy, being ornamented with two rows of gilt navy buttons and a couple of anchors in needlework. A white shirt, a pair of blue pants, a pair of light pumps, and the old Kossuth hat he wore when arrested, completed the attire." Hicks liked to wear the hat down low over one eye to give him a mysterious appearance. He made no gallows speech, only directing the executioner to "Hang me quick — make haste."

Soon after his burial, grave robbers stole his body and possibly sold the cadaver to medical students at Columbia University. Because his body went missing, for years after his death there were unfounded rumors of his survival and escape.

== Legacy ==
Hicks soon became a legend of the New York underworld, with the help of showman P. T. Barnum. Barnum had met Hicks in prison and made a deal that would allow Barnum to take a death mask while he was still alive, and in return Barnum gave Hicks the electric-blue suit he wore during his execution. Barnum used the casting to create a full-size wax statue of Hicks wearing the same clothes as when he committed the murders. The wax likeness was displayed for ten years and seen by millions of visitors before it melted in a museum fire.

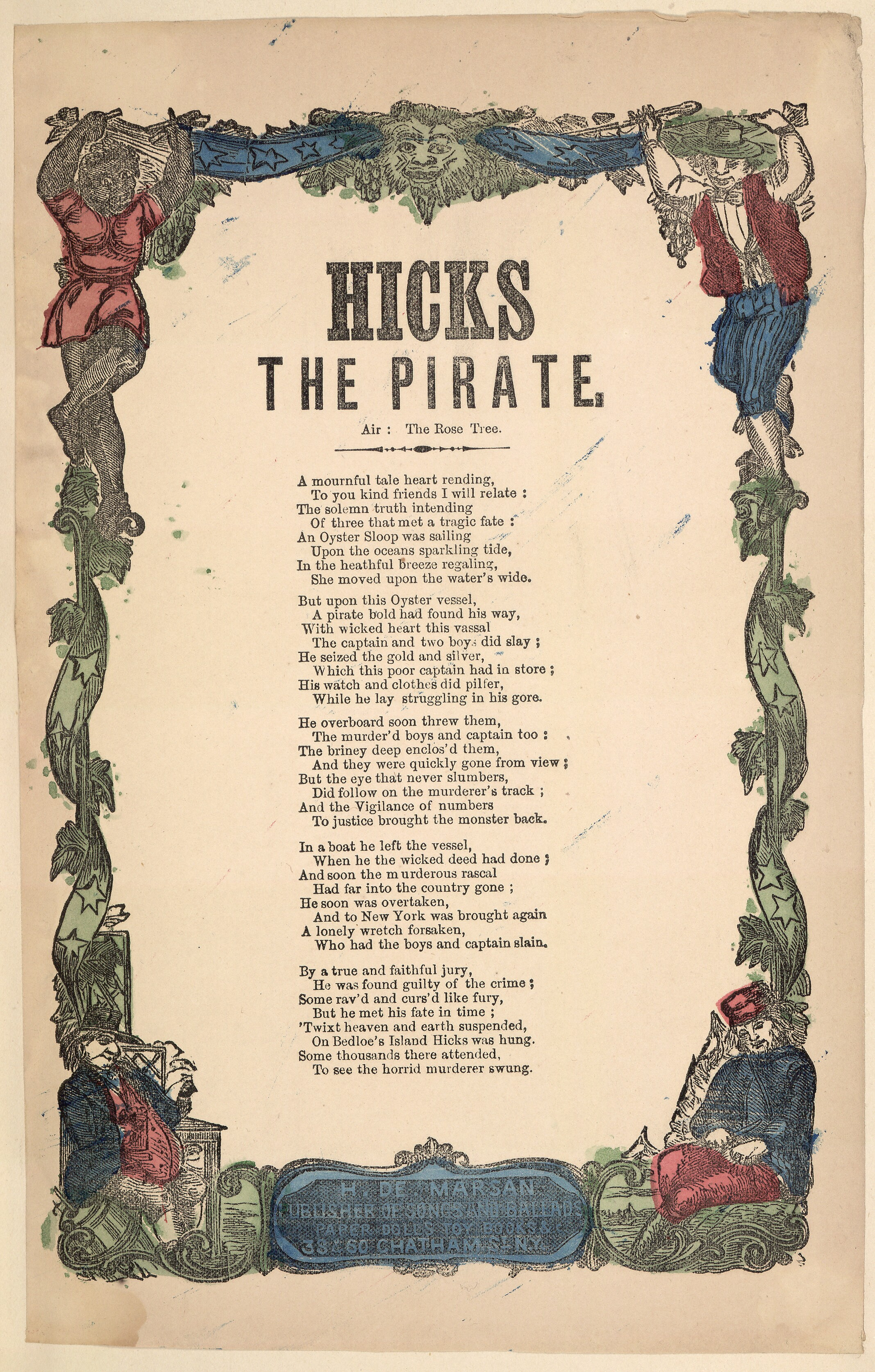
Hicks the Pirate, a murder ballad by H. S. Backus. Sung to: "The Rose Tree" Performed by peakfiddler Audio 00:01:03 (video source)

Biographer Rich Cohen argues that Hicks originated a gangster clothing fashion that can still be seen in art and real life. The "Hicks look" of a Kossuth hat pulled low over one eye, long-tailed monkey jacket and pumped footwear were displayed at the Barnum wax figure museum where millions viewed it. This style passed from gangster to gangster and through generations as a sort of badge of association with legends of the past, eventually reaching Hollywood films of the 1930s and broader culture to the present.

Hicks was hanged on Friday the 13th. There is some speculation Hicks originated or helped solidify a superstition of the day's ill-luck, though there are other theories.

His name became a slang gambling phrase, meaning six on a pair of dice (rhymes with Hicks).

Henry Sherman Backus, an itinerant composer of murder ballads that romanticized crimes, dedicated a ballad titled Hicks the Pirate sung to the traditional Irish tune "The Rose Tree". Irish singer-songwriter Vincent Cross recorded a modern take on the 1860 ballad for his album The Life & Times of James "The Rooster" Corcoran (2020) titled "Albert W. Hicks."

The execution of Albert Hicks is dramatized in Chapter XVIII of MacKinlay Kantor's Pulitzer Prize-winning novel Andersonville (1955).

Hicks was portrayed as a wax figure in The Twilight Zone episode "The New Exhibit". In the show, wax figures in a museum come to life and commit murders when they learn their exhibit is to be shut down. Hicks is accurately dressed in a Kossuth hat and carries a sea axe. He is portrayed by the American actor Bob Mitchell.

== Sources ==
- Brahm, John (April 4, 1963), The New Exhibit (Drama, Fantasy, Horror, Mystery, Sci-Fi, Thriller), Cayuga Productions, CBS Television Network
- NYT staff (July 14, 1860). "Execution of Hicks, the Pirate; Twelve Thousand People at Bedloe's Island. Scenes at the Tombs, in the Bay, and at the Place of Execution. His Confession". The New York Times.
- JoM staff (August 7, 2020). "Vincent Cross – The Life & Times of James 'The Rooster' Corcoran". The Journal of Music.
- Clark, Jerome (August 29, 2020). "Vincent Cross, The Life & Times of James "The Rooster" Corcoran; Cinder Well, No Summer". Rambles.
- Cohen, Rich (June 4, 2019a). The Last Pirate of New York: A Ghost Ship, a Killer, and the Birth of a Gangster Nation. Spiegel & Grau. ISBN 9780399589928.
- Cohen, Rich (June 10, 2019b). "The Original Gangster Style Guy". The New York Times.
- Cohen, Rich (June 4, 2019c). "Meet the 19th-Century Pirate Who Taught New York's Tough Guys How to Flex". Vanity Fair.
- DeVoe, Bill (2008). Trivia from The Twilight Zone. Albany, GA: Bear Manor Media. ISBN 978-1-59393-136-0.
- DeWitt, Robert M. (1860). The Life, Trial, Confession and Execution of Albert W. Hicks, The Pirate and Murderer, Executed on Bedloe's Island, New York Bay. New York: Robert M. De Witt.
- Grams, Martin (2008). The Twilight Zone: Unlocking the Door to a Television Classic. Churchville, MD: OTR Publishing. ISBN 978-0-9703310-9-0.
- Marsan, H. De (1860). "Hicks the Pirate. Air: The Rose Tree. H. De Marsan, Publisher, 38 & 60 Chatham Street, N. Y". Library of Congress Rare Books and Special Collections.
- Monteleone, Vincent (2004). Criminal Slang. New York: Lawbook Exchange. ISBN 1-58477-300-6.
- Pearson, Edmund (1930). "Chapter XVII: The Hanging of Hicks the Pirate". Instigation of the Devil. New York, London: Charles Scribner's Sons. pp. 207–216, 352.
- Steelwater, Eliza (2003). The Hangman's Knot: Lynching, Legal Execution, and America's Struggle with the Death Penalty. Boulder: Westview Press. ISBN 0-8133-4042-X.
- Thorn, John (Fall–Winter 2005). "Murder and Mayhem, Tra-La! The Saugerties Bard". Voices: The Journal of New York Folklore. 31. Archived from the original on 2007-09-28.
- Vincent, Frances (1860). Vincent's semi-annual United States Register. Philadelphia: F. Vincent.
