= Albert Salmi =

American actor (1927–1990)

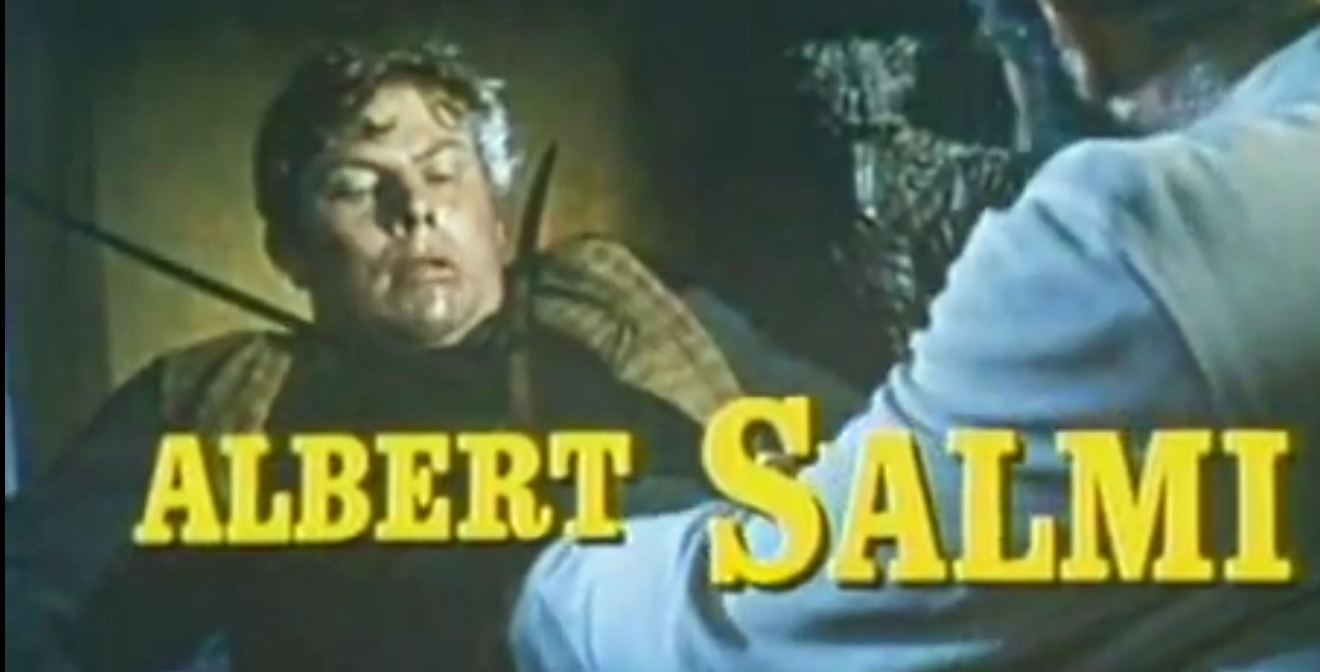
- in the trailer for The Brothers Karamazov (1958)
- Born: March 11, 1927; Brooklyn, New York, U.S.
- Died: April 22, 1990 (aged 63); Spokane, Washington, U.S.
- Resting place: Greenwood Memorial Terrace, Spokane, Washington
- Occupation: Actor
- Years active: 1955–1990
- Spouses: Peggy Ann Garner (m. 1956; div. 1963) Roberta Pollock Taper (m. 1964; died 1990)
- Children: 3

Albert Salmi (March 11, 1927 – April 22, 1990) was an American actor of stage, film, and television. Best known for his work as a character actor, he appeared in over 150 film and television productions.

== Early life ==
Salmi was born and raised in Brooklyn, New York City, the son of Finnish immigrant parents. He attended Haaren High School in Manhattan. Following a stint in the United States Army, Salmi took up acting as a career, studying method acting at the Actors Studio in Manhattan with Lee Strasberg.

== Career ==
In 1955, Salmi starred as Bo Decker in the play Bus Stop on Broadway, and also performed in the touring production of the play. His performance was praised by critics, and Salmi was offered the chance to reprise the role in the film Bus Stop (1956) starring Marilyn Monroe. Salmi turned down the offer because he did not enjoy film work. (Don Murray was later cast as Bo and earned an Academy Award nomination for his performance.)

Despite his numerous appearances in the medium, Salmi shared the opinion of many Actors Studio alumni that roles in film and television were "inferior" to stage work. One of his first television appearances was in the live, televised adaptation of the novel Bang the Drum Slowly (1956), featured on the anthology series The United States Steel Hour opposite Paul Newman and George Peppard. He also had several memorable roles on CBS's The Twilight Zone, including "Of Late I Think of Cliffordville", "A Quality of Mercy", and "Execution". In 1962 he played the role of Sergeant Jenkins in Season One/episode 9, titled "Cat and Mouse," of the series "Combat!" Throughout the episode he was paired in a contentious relationship with lead actor Vic Morrow, who played Sergeant Saunders for the five seasons of the series, and who, at the end of the episode – after Jenkins had bravely given his life to save Saunders and the information Saunders had to get back to the local U.S. Army Command Post (CP) – said of Jenkins "You know it's a funny thing Major, I never had an easier time hating a man, and I'll never have a harder time forgetting one." In 1963, he portrayed John Day and Rivers in the episode "Incident of the Pale Rider" on the CBS series Rawhide. In 1964–65, he appeared with Fess Parker as Yadkin in the first season of the Daniel Boone TV series. He later appeared twice as the incorrigible pirate Alonzo P. Tucker on Lost in Space. He appeared in a 1967 episode of Gunsmoke as a killer who comes to an ironic end. For that performance, Salmi was awarded a Western Heritage Award.

From 1974 to 1976, Salmi co-starred in the NBC legal drama Petrocelli as local investigator Pete Ritter.

Salmi's film career included roles in The Unforgiven (1960), The Outrage (1964), Lawman (1971), Escape from the Planet of the Apes (1971), Viva Knievel! (1977), Empire of the Ants (1977), Love and Bullets (1979), Caddyshack (1980), and the Robert Redford prison film Brubaker (1980). He played Greil in Dragonslayer (1981), Geraldine Page's husband in I'm Dancing as Fast as I Can (1982), "The Young Riders" (1989), and the hard-drinking but loving father of character Diana Lawson in Hard to Hold (1984).

== Personal life ==
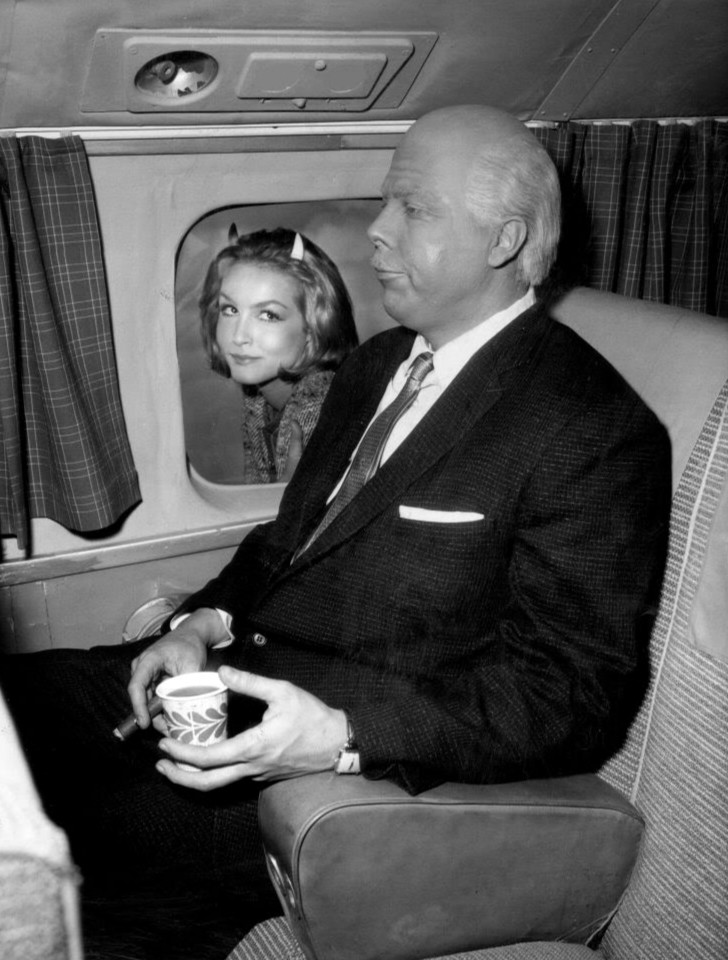
Julie Newmar and Albert Salmi (in elderly makeup) in "Of Late I Think of Cliffordville", a 1963 episode of The Twilight Zone

Salmi met actress Peggy Ann Garner while the two were performing in the National Company touring production of Bus Stop in 1955. They were married on May 18, 1956, in New York City. Their only child, Catherine Ann "Cas" Salmi, was born on March 30, 1957; Catherine died in 1995 of heart disease at the age of 38. Salmi and Garner divorced in 1963.

In 1964, Salmi married Roberta Pollock Taper; the couple had two daughters, Elizabeth and Jennifer. In 1983, the family moved from Los Angeles to Spokane, Washington, where Salmi went into semi-retirement, taking occasional acting roles. Salmi later taught acting and appeared in community and regional theater.

In February 1990, Albert and Roberta Salmi separated. He moved into their Idaho condominium, while Roberta remained in the family home in Spokane. She filed for divorce on February 6. According to court documents, Roberta Salmi claimed that her husband was an alcoholic who physically abused her when he drank. She also claimed that Salmi threatened her on several occasions, and she was in fear for her life. Roberta later took out a restraining order against her husband. In response to her claims in the court documents, Salmi denied physically abusing Roberta and blamed their estrangement on her emotional issues.

On April 23, 1990, Albert Salmi and his estranged wife Roberta were found dead in their Spokane home by a friend who stopped by to check on her. According to newspaper accounts, Salmi fatally shot Roberta in the kitchen of her home, before shooting himself in an upstairs room.

On April 26, Salmi's funeral was held at the Hennessey-Smith Funeral Home, after which he was cremated and placed in a niche at Greenwood Memorial Terrace cemetery in Spokane; the marker is listed as "Our Beloved Dad".

== Filmography ==
- The Philco Television Playhouse (1953)

Jim Demming in S5:E31, "The Rainmaker"

- Studio One (1954–1958) 3 episodes

Luther in S6:E24, "Side Street" (1954)
Skeets Chase in S9:E3, "The Open Door" (1956)
Lenny Shank in S10:E39, "Man Under Glass" (1958)

- The United States Steel Hour (1956–1957) 4 episodes

John Kattrell in S3:E22 "Noon on Doomsday" (1956)
Bruce Pierson in S4:E2 "Bang the Drum Slowly" (1956)
Holmes in S4:E5, "Survival" (1956)
Joel Shay in S4:E16, "The Hill Wife" (1957)

- Alfred Hitchcock Presents (1957–1958) 2 episodes

S2:E39, "The Dangerous People" - Jones
S4:E3, "The Jokester" - Mr. Bradley

- The Brothers Karamazov (1958) Smerdjakov
- Climax! (1958, 2 episodes) — Lieutenant Irwin Nichols

Season 4 Episode 24: "The Volcano Seat"
Season 4 Episode 32: "Volcano Seat, #2"

- The Bravados (1958) — Ed Taylor
- General Electric Theater (1959)

Billy Ashbold in S7:E21, "The Family Man"

- Adventures in Paradise (1959)

Paul LeBlanc in S1:E12, "Somewhere South of Suva"

- The Unforgiven (1960) — Charlie Rawlins
- Alcoa Presents: One Step Beyond (1960)

"The Peter Hurkos Story: Part 1" as Peter Hurkos
"The Peter Hurkos Story: Part 2" as Peter Hurkos

- Wild River (1960) - Hank "R.J." Bailey
- Hotel de Paree (1960)

S1:E32, "Sundance and the Delayed Gun"

- Have Gun - Will Travel (1960)

Father Montalvo in S4:E16, "The Sanctuary"

- Rawhide (1960–1963) 2 episodes

Vince Lohman in S3:E9, "Incident of the Captive";
John Day / Rivers in S5:E23, "Incident of the Pale Rider"

- The Twilight Zone (1960–1963) 3 episodes

Joe Caswell in S1:E26, "Execution"
Sgt. Causarano in S3:E15, "A Quality of Mercy"
Feathersmith in S4:E14, "Of Late I Think of Cliffordville"

- Bonanza (1960–1972) 4 episodes

Albie in S2:E13, "Silent Thunder" (1960)
Marcus Alley in S9:E17, "The Thirteenth Man" (1968)
Sheriff in S13:E21, "Search in Limbo" (1972)
Stretch in S14:E6, "Ambush at Rio Lobo" (1972)

- Naked City (1961)

Lennard Brewer in S2:E16, "Button in the Haystack"

- The Untouchables (1961)

Steve 'Country Boy' Parrish in S3:E2, "Power Play"

- Tales of Wells Fargo (1961)

Jeremiah Logart in S6:E7, "Jeremiah"

- The Investigators (1961)

Del Bennit in S1:E10, "The Panic Wagon"

- Wagon Train (1961–1962) 2 episodes

George Carder in S4:E36, "Wagon to Fort Anderson"
Frank Carter in S5:E34, "The Frank Carter Story"

- Saints and Sinners (1962)

Paul Manzak in S1:E6, "Three Columns of Anger"

- The Eleventh Hour (1962)

Ken Bradley in S1:E7: "Angie, You Made My Heart Stop"

- Stoney Burke (1962)

Larry Dawson in S1:E10, "The Wanderer"

- Combat! (1962)

Sergeant Jenkins in S1:E9, "Cat and Mouse"

- The Defenders (1962)

Peter Brinks in S2:E13, "The Apostle"

- Route 66 (1962–1963) 3 episodes

Season 2: Episode 15, "A Long Piece of Mischief"
S3:E29, "Who Will Cheer My Bonnie Bride?"
Season 4: Episode 12, "93 Percent in Smiling"

- The Virginian (1962–1968) 4 episodes

Quinn in S1:E9, "It Tolls for Thee"
Brother Thaddeus in S2:E7, "Brother Thaddeus"
Rafe Simmons in S4:E3, "A Little Learning"
C.T. Smoot in S6:E16, "The Death Wagon"

- The Alfred Hitchcock Hour (1963)

S1:E21, "I'll Be Judge — I'll Be Jury" — Theodore Bond

- The Travels of Jaimie McPheeters (1963)

Frank Turner in S1:E3, "The Day of the First Suitor"

- Redigo (1963)

Ward Bennet in S1:E7, "Man in a Blackout"

- The Fugitive (1964) — Chuck Mathers

S1:E22 "Angels Travel on Lonely Roads: Part 1"
S1:E23 "Angels Travel on Lonely Roads: Part 2"

- Destry (1964)

Ed Bender in S1:E5, "The Nicest Girl in Gomorrah"

- The Outrage (1964) — Sheriff
- Profiles in Courage (1964)

Mr. Schneider in S1:E2, "Mary S. McDowell"

- Daniel Boone (1964–65, 20 episodes) — Yadkin
- I Spy (1965)

Dr. Chulock in S1:E11, "Weight of the World"

- Laredo (1965)

Cletus Grogan in S1:E11, "Jinx"

- Battle of the Bulge (1965) — Uncredited (Fuel Truck soldier)
- A Man Called Shenandoah (1966)

Will Turner in Season 1: Episode 16, "The Accused"

- Voyage to the Bottom of the Sea (1966)

Captain Albert Brent in S2:E21, "Dead Man's Doubloons"

- The Legend of Jesse James (1966)

Paul Mason in S1:E23, "The Lonely Place"

- The Monroes (1966)

Hasner in S1:E5, "Wild Dog of the Tetons"

- Jericho (1966)

Pia Androvic in S1:E4, "Have Traitor, Will Travel"

- T.H.E. Cat (1966)

Cantorte in S1:E4, "Brotherhood"

- 12 O'Clock High (1966)

Major Brunner in S3:E8, "The Pariah"

- The Big Valley (1966–1967) 2 episodes

Keno in S1:E20, "Under a Dark Star"
Birch in S3:E15, "The Buffalo Man"

- Lost in Space (1966–1967) 2 episodes

Alonzo P. Tucker in S1:E18, "The Sky Pirate"
Alonzo P. Tucker in S2:E23, "Treasure of the Lost Planet"

- Gunsmoke (1966–1970) 3 episodes

Holly in S11:E16, "Death Watch" (1966)
Ed Carstairs in S12:E26, "Mistaken Identity" (1967)
Willis Jeeter in S16:E14, "Sergeant Holly" (1970)

- The F.B.I. (1966–1972)

'Cowboy' Eddie Richards in S1:E30, "The Plunderers"
Roy Mills in S6:E26, "Three-Way Split"
Clifton Taggot in S8:E11, "Canyon of No Return"

- The Road West (1967)

Hawes Leggett in S1:E29, "Elizabeth's Odyssey"

- The Flim-Flam Man (1967) — Deputy Meshaw
- Hour of the Gun (1967) — Octavius Roy
- Custer (1967)

John Mark Charrington in S1:E13, "Dangerous Prey"

- Cimarron Strip (1967)

Sam Gallatin in S1:E13, "The Last Wolf"

- The Ambushers (1967) — Jose Ortega
- Judd, for the Defense (1968)

S1:E21, "What You Can Do with Money"

- That Girl (1968)

George in Season 2: Episode 24 "Great Guy"

- Three Guns for Texas (1968) — Cletus Grogan
- Land of the Giants (1970)

Melzac / Bryk in S2:E25, "Graveyard of Fools"

- McCloud (1970)

Goose Jenkins in S1:E3, "The Concrete Corral"

- The Interns (1970)

Lt. Osland in S1:E4, "An Afternoon in the Fall"

- San Francisco International Airport (1970)

Murph in S1:E6, "The High Cost of Nightmares"

- The Deserter (1970) - Sgt. Schmidt
- Menace on the Mountain (1970) - Poss Timmerlake
- Hawaii Five-O (1970)

Vince Ryan in S3:E13, "The Payoff"

- Lawman (1971) — Harvey Stenbaugh
- The High Chaparral (1971)

White Horse in S4:E17, "A Man to Match the Land"

- The Name of the Game (1971)

Season 3: Episode 24, "The Showdown"

- Escape from the Planet of the Apes (1971) — E-1
- Something Big (1971) — Jonny Cobb
- Night Gallery

Joe Bristol in S2:E18, "The Waiting Room" segment

- Kung Fu (1972–1974) 3 episodes

(1972: Pilot Movie, Raif)
(1973: "Nine Lives", Shawn Mulhare)
(1974: "Cry of the Night Beast", Reuben Branch)

- McMillan & Wife (1973)

Joe Marley in S2:E5, "No Hearts, No Flowers"

- Love, American Style (1973)

Victor in S4:E21, "Love and the Vertical Romance" segment

- The Streets of San Francisco (1973)

Joe Rudolph in S1:E21, "The House on Hyde Street"

- Barnaby Jones (1973)

Vincent Buccola in S2:E8, "The Deadly Prize"

- Ironside (1973)

Bill Eaton in S6:E14, "Ollinger's Last Case"
Matt Morris in S7:E11, "Double-Edged Corner"

- Toma (1974)

Max Fabian in S1:E13, "A Funeral for Max Berlin"

- Hec Ramsey (1974)

John Rhodes in S2:E4, "Scar Tissue"

- The Take (1974) — Dolek
- A Place Without Parents (1974) — Cannonball
- The Legend of Earl Durand (1974) — Jack McQueen
- The Crazy World of Julius Vrooder (1974) — Splint
- Run, Joe, Run (1974)

Clyde Barnes in Season 1: Episode 7, "Homecoming"

- Petrocelli (1974–1976) - Pete Ritter, 44 episodes
- Ellery Queen (1976)

S1:E19, "The Adventure of the Tyrant of Tin Pan Alley"

- Once an Eagle (1977)

Senator Bert McConnadin in S1:E6, "Part 6"

- Baretta (1977)

Carl Kruegar in S3:E18, "The Runaways"

- Future Cop (1977)

Chief Ross Wheeler in S1:E2, "The Mad Mad Bomber"

- Black Oak Conspiracy (1977) - Sheriff Otis Grimes
- Viva Knievel! (1977) — Cortland
- Moonshine County Express (1977) — Sheriff Larkin
- Empire of the Ants (1977) — Sheriff Art Kincade
- Harold Robbins' 79 Park Avenue (1977)

Peter Markevich in S1:E1, "Part 1"

- Hunter

Clark in S1:E12, "The Lovejoy File"

- Love and Bullets (1979) — Andy Minton
- The Sweet Creek County War (1979) - George Breakworth
- B.J. and the Bear (1979)

Orville Rucker in S1:E2, "Shine On"

- Steel (1979) — Tank
- Undercover with the KKK (1979) - Lester Mitchell
- Cuba Crossing (1980) — Delgato
- Cloud Dancer (1980) — Ozzie Randolph
- Brubaker (1980) — Rory Poke
- Caddyshack (1980) — Mr. Noonan
- Dragonslayer (1981) — Greil
- St. Helens (1981) — Clyde Whittaker
- The Guns and the Fury (1981) — Colonel Liahkov
- Burned at the Stake (1982) — Captain Billingham
- I'm Dancing as Fast as I Can (1982) — Ben Martin
- Superstition (1982) — Inspector Sturgess
- The Fall Guy (1982)

Sheriff Baker in S1:E17, "Guess Who's Coming to Town?"

- Love Child (1982) — Captain Ellis
- St. Elsewhere (1982)

Leo Rushcom in S1:E6, "Legionnaires: Part 1"

- Dallas (1982–83) - 3 episodes

Season 6: Episode 8, "The Ewing Touch" - Gil Thurman
Season 6: Episode 9, "Fringe Benefits" - Gil Thurman
Season 6: Episode 17, "Crash of '83" - Gil Thurman

- Simon & Simon (1983)

S2:E20, "The Secret of the Chrome Eagle"

- The A-Team (1983)

Jonathan Fletcher in S2:E1, "Diamonds 'n Dust"

- Knight Rider (1983)

Buck Rayburn in S2:E8, "Custom K.I.T.T."

- Hart to Hart (1983)

Colonel Mac Bridger in S5:E9, "Highland Fling"

- Scarecrow and Mrs. King (1983)

Ted Rudolph in S1:E10, "The Long Christmas Eve"

- Hard to Hold (1984) — Johnny Lawson
- Trapper John, M.D. (1984)

William Thurman Wilson in S6:E10, "Double Bubble"

- Knots Landing (1984–85) 2 episodes

S6:E7, "Love to Take You Home" - Jonathan J. Rush
S7:E11, "To Sing His Praise" - Jonathan J. Rush

- Murder, She Wrote (1985)

Joe Downing in S1:E18, "Murder Takes the Bus"

- Born American (1986) — US Ambassador Drane
- Jesse (1988) - Sheriff Bill Sommers
- Billy the Kid (1989) - Mr. Maxwell
- CBS Summer Playhouse (1989)

J.B. Salter in Season 3: Episode 2, "B-Men"

- Breaking In (1989) — Johnny Scot, Poker Player
- The Young Riders (1989)

Bart Nickerson in S1:E4, "Speak No Evil"

- Mission Impossible (1989)

Richard Kester in S2:E8, "The Fuehrer's Children"

== Bibliography ==
- Grabman, Sandra (2004). "Spotlights & Shadows: The Albert Salmi Story". Published by Bear Manor Media 2004, second edition 2010. ISBN 978-1-59393-425-5.
