= Cuppy's Coffee =

US coffeehouse chain

Cuppy's Coffee & More, Inc.
- Type: Private
- Industry: Mobile Restaurants, Franchises
- Founded: 2006, Fort Walton Beach, FL
- Headquarters: Fort Walton Beach, Florida, The Americas,

Cuppy's Coffee & More, Inc. was a privately owned specialty coffee franchise. Cuppy's, along with Java Jo'z national chain folded in 2009. However, former franchisees still continue to use the name in their shops.

== Corporation ==
Cuppy's Coffee & More, Inc., a Texas corporation, was formed in July 2006. It is owned by Dale Nabors, who owns its parent company Medina Management and FranSynergy, Inc. successor-in-interest to Elite. According to unhappyfranchisee.com, Cuppy's has been accused of fraud in its dealings with potential franchisees. The issue was complicated in May 2009 when Nabors was arrested in Alabama on charges of fraud and warrant for his arrest for similar charges was issued in Florida. Cuppy’s Coffee, Smoothies & More, Inc. announced a record year of growth in 2007 marked by the opening of 33 stores and the signing of franchise agreements for more than 200 locations to open in 2008.

== See also ==
- List of coffeehouse chains
