= John T. Frederick =

Literature professor and magazine editor (1893–1975)

John Towner Frederick (February 1, 1893 – January 31, 1975), born Corning, Iowa and only child of Oliver Roberts and Mary Elmira Frederick. He was a noted professor and literary editor, scholar, critic, and novelist.

== Family ==
He married Esther Paulus on June 22, 1915, and had two children, John Joseph and James Oliver. Esther died in 1954 and he married Lucy Gertrude Paulus in the early 1960s. He died January 31, 1975, and is buried in Harrisville, Michigan near his summer home of Glennie, Michigan. An interesting note-his granddaughter currently resides in the house near Glennie with her husband and her two sons.

== Education ==
Graduated from Corning High School in 1909. Attended University of Iowa starting at age 16 in 1909. He was elected to Phi Beta Kappa and was his class president. He received a BA degree in 1915 and a master's degree from Iowa in 1917. In 1962 at his retirement, he received an honorary Doctor of Literature from the University of Notre Dame.

== Career highlights ==
- Founder and Editor of The Midland, a literary magazine published 1915 to 1933.
- Authored numerous books, including his early works entitled Druida (1923) and Green Bush.
- Member of the Department of English at the University of Iowa from 1921 to 1930.
- Conducted Of Men and Books on CBS radio from 1937 to 1944.
- Professor at both Northwestern University (Medill School of Journalism) and University of Notre Dame from 1930 to 1945.
- Professor at Notre Dame from 1945 to 1962.
- Chairman of Notre Dame's Department of English for three years prior to his retirement (1959–1962).
- Visiting University of Iowa Department of English professor from 1962 to 1970.
- Book reviewer for Chicago Tribune.
