= Fred Feldkamp =

American film director (1914–1981)

Fred J. Feldkamp (March 2, 1914 – December 7, 1981) was an American writer, editor, and film producer. He was married to fashion writer Phyllis Dubsky Feldkamp from the 1940s.

== Career ==
Feldkamp was born on March 2, 1914, in Newark, New Jersey. He served in World War II as a correspondent with the Marine Corps in the Pacific. After the war Feldkamp became a producer of his own films, an editor of the American magazine Life, and a writer for the newsreel "The March of Time." Feldkamp died in Bryn Mawr, Pennsylvania, at the age of 67.

=== Films produced ===
In 1949, Feldkamp adapted General Dwight D. Eisenhower's book Crusade in Europe for a 26-part television series which featured actual film footage of World War II and won the Peabody Award. Additionally, he wrote for another 26-part television series called Crusade in the Pacific which premiered in 1951. He also independently produced three movies, Operation Manhunt (1954), The Silken Affair (1956), and Triple Cross (1966).

=== Books edited ===
Feldkamp served as a friend and literary editor to American humorist Will Cuppy and worked extensively on many of the author's satirical history essays. After Cuppy died in 1949, both Feldkamp and his wife Phyllis sorted through thousands of his close friend's files and notes to finish writing The Decline and Fall of Practically Everybody, a piece of historical satire that the writer had been working on for many years. Due to Feldkamp's dedication and hard work, the book was published in 1950, less than a year after Cuppy's death. For his deceased friend, he edited another posthumous volume, a comic almanac titled How to Get from January to December, that appeared in 1951.

=== Books written ===
Feldkamp wrote two books about travel. The first, written in 1972, is titled, "The Good Life or What's Left of It (1972) and was co-authored by his wife Phyllis Feldkamp, a prominent figure in the fashion-writing world from Philly to Paris. This book details the pleasures and enjoyment of life in France. ISBN 978-0-06-122480-5 The second book, *Not Everybody's Europe, written in 1976, provides descriptions and illustrations of Europe, all helpful for traveling the continent. ISBN 978-0-06-122481-2

=== Articles written ===
Feldkamp contributed several articles to the magazine The New Yorker. These include:

- "Benny" (March 11, 1933)
- "Relative" with Russell Maloney (October 2, 1937)
- "The Comment" with E.B. White (August 11, 1939)
- "MIXTURE FOR MEN: A Collection of Fact and Humor by Some of the Best Writers of Short Pieces in Our Time" (1947)
- "The Talk of the Town" with St. Clair McKelway (January 11, 1958)
- "Cite du Cheval" (June 6, 1970)
- "Deauville" (August 14, 1971)
