= 15017 Cuppy =

Main-belt asteroid

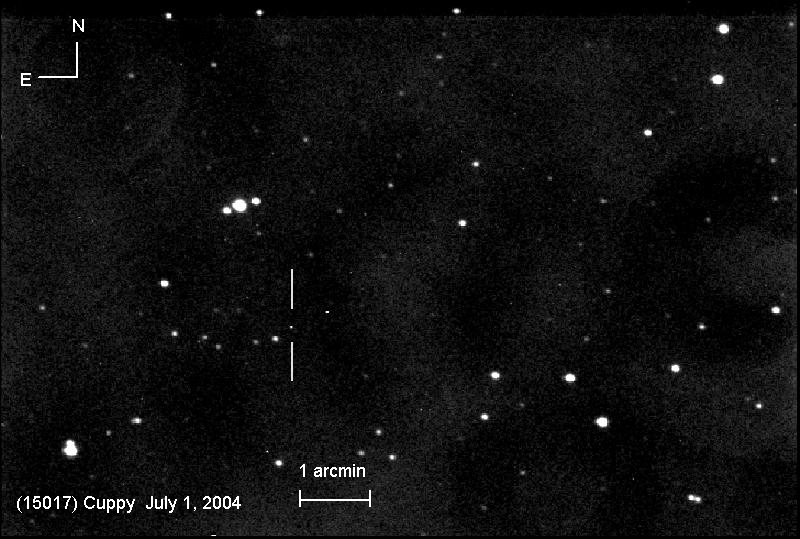
- Cuppy as viewed from Auburn, Indiana, using a 40.5 cm RCOS telescope in July 2004

Discovery
- Discovered by: LONEOS
- Discovery site: Anderson Mesa Stn.
- Discovery date: 22 September 1998

Designations
- Named after: Will Cuppy (American humorist)
- Alternative designations: 1998 SS_{25}
- Minor planet category: main-belt · (inner); Flora

Orbital characteristics
- Epoch 4 September 2017 (JD 2458000.5)
- Uncertainty parameter 0
- Observation arc: 25.30 yr (9,242 days)
- Aphelion: 2.7011 AU
- Perihelion: 1.9517 AU
- Semi-major axis: 2.3264 AU
- Eccentricity: 0.1611
- Orbital period (sidereal): 3.55 yr (1,296 days)
- Mean anomaly: 94.456°
- Mean motion: 0° 16^{m} 40.08^{s} / day
- Inclination: 6.2109°
- Longitude of ascending node: 63.826°
- Argument of perihelion: 347.85°

Physical characteristics
- Dimensions: 1.795±0.226; 2 km (estimated at 0.25)
- Geometric albedo: 0.500±0.219
- Absolute magnitude (H): 15.6

15017 Cuppy (provisional designation 1998 SS_{25}) is a Florian asteroid from the inner regions of the asteroid belt, approximately 2 kilometers in diameter. It was discovered on 22 September 1998, by the Lowell Observatory Near-Earth-Object Search (LONEOS) at its Anderson Mesa Station, Arizona, United States. The asteroid was named for American humorist Will Cuppy.

== Orbit and classification ==
Cuppy orbits the Sun in the inner main-belt at a distance of 2.0–2.7 AU once every 3 years and 7 months (1,296 days). Its orbit has an eccentricity of 0.16 and an inclination of 6° with respect to the ecliptic. The body's observation arc begins 7 years prior to its official discovery observation, with a precovery taken at Palomar Observatory in October 1991.

== Physical characteristics ==
According to the survey carried out by the NEOWISE mission of NASA's Wide-field Infrared Survey Explorer, Cuppy measures 1.8 kilometers in diameter and its surface has an albedo of 0.50. This is in line with a generic absolute magnitude-to-diameter conversion, which gives a diameter of approximately 2 kilometers for an absolute magnitude of 15.6 and an assumed albedo of 0.2 to 0.25, which is typical for stony asteroids of the inner asteroid belt. As of 2017, Cuppy's composition, rotation period and shape remain unknown.

== Naming ==
This minor planet was named in memory of American literary critic and humorist, Will Cuppy (1884–1949). He is known for his satirical books The Decline and Fall of Practically Everybody, How to Attract the Wombat, How to Become Extinct and How to Tell Your Friends from the Apes. The name was proposed by M. Walter. The approved naming citation was published by the Minor Planet Center on 10 September 2003 (M.P.C. 49675).
