= Intrada Records =

American record company

Intrada
- Founded: 1985
- Founder: Douglass Fake
- Genre: Soundtracks
- Country of origin: United States
- Location: Oakland, California
- Official website: store.intrada.com

Intrada is an American record company based in Oakland, California, founded by Douglass Fake (1952-2024). The company specializes in movie and television soundtracks, with an extensive catalog including many works by Jerry Goldsmith.

Intrada was founded in 1985 by producer/owner Fake in San Francisco, California. It relocated to Oakland, California at the turn of the millennium and expanded operations, increasing the volume of albums released and adding Roger Feigelson as Director of Business Operations. In addition to standard soundtrack releases, Intrada features The Excalibur Collection, a series of world premiere re-recordings of film scores, reconstructed and performed by professional orchestras as well as a series of limited-edition historic soundtracks, produced in cooperation with film studios and the American Federation of Musicians.

Fake was a producer and composer, and died after an extended illness in July 2024. His producing credits include the first complete restoration of Leonard Bernstein’s On the Waterfront, a 6-CD release of Elmer Bernstein conducting his music from The Ten Commandments and the premiere of several Henry Mancini underscores including Breakfast at Tiffany’s, which was previously only available in abridged pop recordings. He also supervised the re-recording of a dozen albums of classic film music, most recently Bernard Herrmann’s music for Alfred Hitchcock’s The Man Who Knew Too Much, as well as Miklos Rozsa’s Ivanhoe, Julius Caesar, and Spellbound.

Intrada continues to operate as a label and retail store (managed by long-time associate Jeff Johnson) selling their own releases in addition to those of other labels.

== CD releases ==
=== Current categories ===
Intrada Special Collection Series

Catalog #	Title	Year	Composer	Limited?	Released	Additional Notes
ISC Vol. 001	Switchback	1997	Basil Poledouris	???? units	2000	
ISC Vol. 002	The Conversation	1974	David Shire	???? units	2001	
ISC Vol. 003	Jack the Bear	1993	James Horner	1500 units	2001-11-08	
ISC Vol. 004	The Barbarian and the Geisha	1958	Hugo Friedhofer	???? units	2002-01	
ISC Vol. 005	Silver Streak	1976	Henry Mancini	???? units	2002	
ISC Vol. 006	The Story on Page One / The Reward	1959 / 1965	Elmer Bernstein	1500 units	2002-08	
ISC Vol. 007	Mussolini: The Untold Story	1985	Laurence Rosenthal	1000 units	2002-10	
ISC Vol. 008	Miracle on 34th Street	1994	Bruce Broughton	1500 units	2002-12	
ISC Vol. 009	Roughing It!	2002	Bruce Broughton	1500 units	2003-04	
ISC Vol. 010	Brubaker	1980	Lalo Schifrin	???? units	2003-06	
ISC Vol. 011	Mr. Hobbs Takes a Vacation	1962	Henry Mancini	1500 units	2003-08-26	
ISC Vol. 012	National Geographic: Yankee Sails Across Europe/Grizzly!	1967	Elmer Bernstein / Jerome Moross	???? units	2003-11-25	
ISC Vol. 013	Bring Me the Head of Alfredo Garcia / The Killer Elite	1974 / 1975	Jerry Fielding	???? units	2004-02-24	
ISC Vol. 014	Narrow Margin	1990	Bruce Broughton	1500 units	2004-05-25	
ISC Vol. 015	The Enemy Below	1957	Leigh Harline	1000 units	2004-06-24	
ISC Vol. 016	Bandolero!	1968	Jerry Goldsmith	1500 units	2004-09-07	
ISC Vol. 017	Lawman	1971	Jerry Fielding	1500 units	2004-12	
ISC Vol. 018	Lock Up	1989	Bill Conti	1200 units	2005-01-25	
ISC Vol. 019	Hell and High Water	1954	Alfred Newman	1200 units	2005-04	
ISC Vol. 020	National Geographic: The Last Vikings / Dr. Leakey And The Dawn Of Man	1972 / 1966	Ernest Gold / Leonard Rosenman	1500 units	2005-06-07	
ISC Vol. 021	Capricorn One	1978	Jerry Goldsmith	3000 units	2005-07-19	
ISC Vol. 022	David and Bathsheba	1951	Alfred Newman	1500 units	2005-08-02	
ISC Vol. 023	Judgment Night	1993	Alan Silvestri	2000 units	2005-08-23	
ISC Vol. 024	Heart Like a Wheel	1983	Laurence Rosenthal	1200 units	2005-09-13	
ISC Vol. 025	Planet Of The Apes (1974 TV-series)	1974	Lalo Schifrin & Earle Hagen	3000 units	2005-10-11	
ISC Vol. 026	Hush... Hush, Sweet Charlotte	1964	Frank DeVol	1200 units	2005-11-22	
ISC Vol. 027	Warlock / Violent Saturday	1959 / 1955	Leigh Harline / Hugo Friedhofer	1200 units	2005-12	
ISC Vol. 028	The Lost World / Five Weeks in a Balloon	1960 / 1962	Paul Sawtell & Bert Shefter	1200 units	2006-01	
ISC Vol. 029	Black Widow	1987	Michael Small	1200 units	2006-02-17	
ISC Vol. 030	House of Bamboo	1955	Leigh Harline	1200 units	2006-04	
ISC Vol. 031	The Revolt of Mamie Stover / Hilda Crane	1956	Hugo Friedhofer / David Raksin	1200 units	2006-05	
ISC Vol. 032	Amazing Stories: Anthology One (2-CD-Set)	1985–1987	John Williams & Various	3000 units	2006-05-12	
ISC Vol. 033	The Driver / The Star Chamber	1978 / 1983	Michael Small	1200 units	2006-06-20	
ISC Vol. 034	Amazing Stories: Anthology Two (2-CD-Set)	1985–1987	John Williams & Various	3000 units	2006-08-29	
ISC Vol. 035	Inchon (2-CD-Set)	1981	Jerry Goldsmith	1500 units	2006-09	
ISC Vol. 036	Saturn 3	1980	Elmer Bernstein	2500 units	2006-09	
ISC Vol. 037	The Pick-up Artist / Sherlock Holmes in New York	1987 / 1976	Georges Delerue / Richard Rodney Bennett	1200 units	2006-10-09	
ISC Vol. 038	2001: A Space Odyssey (Original Rejected Score)	1968	Alex North	3000 units	2007-01	
ISC Vol. 039	Max Dugan Returns / I Ought to Be in Pictures	1983 / 1982	David Shire / Marvin Hamlisch	1200 units	2007-02-13	
ISC Vol. 040	The Hindenburg	1975	David Shire	3000 units	2007-01-25	
ISC Vol. 041	A Walk with Love and Death	1969	Georges Delerue	1500 units	2007-03-20	
ISC Vol. 042	The Devil's Brigade	1968	Alex North	2000 units	2007-05-24	
ISC Vol. 043	In Love and War / Woman Obsessed	1958 / 1959	Hugo Friedhofer	1200 units	2007-05-16	
ISC Vol. 044	Amazing Stories: Anthology Three (2-CD-Set)	1985–1987	John Williams & Various	3000 units	2007-06-12	
ISC Vol. 045	Malone	1987	David Newman	1500 units	2007-07-11	
ISC Vol. 046	The Last Valley	1970	John Barry	3000 units	2007-06-26	
ISC Vol. 047	The Seven-Ups / The Verdict	1973 / 1982	Don Ellis / Johnny Mandel	1200 units	2006-04	
ISC Vol. 048	Bill & Ted's Bogus Journey	1991	David Newman	1500 units	2007-09-04	
ISC Vol. 049	Throw Momma from the Train	1987	David Newman	1500 units	2007-09-18	
ISC Vol. 050	The Monster Squad	1987	Bruce Broughton	3000 units	2007-09	
ISC Vol. 051	Monsignor	1982	John Williams	3000 units	2007-10-16	
ISC Vol. 052	Harry and the Hendersons	1987	Bruce Broughton	3000 units	2007-10-30	
ISC Vol. 053	Metalstorm: The Destruction of Jared-Syn	1983	Richard Band	1200 units	2007-11-06	
ISC Vol. 054	Jaws 3-D	1983	Alan Parker	3000 units	2007-12-11	
ISC Vol. 055	The Mechanic	1972	Jerry Fielding	1500 units	2007-12-11	
ISC Vol. 056	Swashbuckler	1976	John Addison	3000 units		
ISC Vol. 057	The Blue and the Gray	1982	Bruce Broughton	2000 units	2008-02-12	
ISC Vol. 058	Chato's Land	1972	Jerry Fielding	1500 units	2008-01-14	
ISC Vol. 059	Mary, Queen of Scots	1971	John Barry	3000 units		
ISC Vol. 060	Buck Rogers in the 25th Century	1979	Stu Phillips	3000 units		
ISC Vol. 061	Comes a Horseman	1978	Michael Small	1500 units		
ISC Vol. 062	Baby: Secret of the Lost Legend	1985	Jerry Goldsmith	3000 units		
ISC Vol. 063	The Nightcomers	1971	Jerry Fielding	1500 units	2008-05-05	
ISC Vol. 064	The Stunt Man / An Unmarried Woman	1980 / 1978	Dominic Frontiere / Bill Conti	3000 units		
ISC Vol. 065	WarGames	1983	Arthur B. Rubinstein	2500 units		
ISC Vol. 066	Cross Creek	1983	Leonard Rosenman	1500 units		
ISC Vol. 067	The Big Gamble / Treasure of the Golden Condor	1961 / 1953	Maurice Jarre / Sol Kaplan	1200 units		
ISC Vol. 068	Emperor of the North Pole / Caprice	1973 / 1967	Frank De Vol	1200 units		
ISC Vol. 069	Scorpio	1973	Jerry Fielding	1500 units	2008-06-01	
ISC Vol. 070	Cinderella Liberty	1973	John Williams	3000 units		
ISC Vol. 071	Who'll Stop the Rain	1978	Laurence Rosenthal	1200 units		
ISC Vol. 072	Shogun	1980	Maurice Jarre	3000 units		Expanded Re-issue as ISC Vol. 394
ISC Vol. 073	Way ... Way Out / Braddock	1966 / 1968	Lalo Schifrin	1500 units		
ISC Vol. 074	The First Olympics: Athens 1896 (2-CD-Set)	1984	Bruce Broughton	2000 units		
ISC Vol. 075	The Boys from Brazil (2-CD-Set)	1978	Jerry Goldsmith	5000 units		
ISC Vol. 076	Missing in Action 2: The Beginning	1985	Brian May	1500 units		
ISC Vol. 077	Species	1995	Christopher Young	3000 units		
ISC Vol. 078	Boy on a Dolphin	1957	Hugo Friedhofer	1500 units		
ISC Vol. 079	Desire Under the Elms	1958	Elmer Bernstein	3000 units		
ISC Vol. 080	Jingle All The Way	1996	David Newman	1500 units	2008-11-03	
ISC Vol. 081	Treasure of the Four Crowns	1983	Ennio Morricone	1500 units	2008-11-03	
ISC Vol. 082	Little Monsters	1989	David Newman	1000 units		
ISC Vol. 083	How to Steal a Million / Bachelor Flat (2-CD-Set)	1966	John Williams	2500 units		
ISC Vol. 084	9 to 5	1980	Charles Fox	3000 units		
ISC Vol. 085	The Killer Elite	1975	Jerry Fielding	1500 units	2008-12-01	
ISC Vol. 086	Body Double	1984	Pino Donaggio	3000 units	2008-12-15	
ISC Vol. 087	Gold	1974	Elmer Bernstein	3000 units		
ISC Vol. 088	Foul Play	1978	Charles Fox	???? units		
ISC Vol. 089	The Golden Seal	1983	John Barry & Dana Kaproff	2000 units		
ISC Vol. 090	Until September	1984	John Barry	1200 units		
ISC Vol. 091	Missing in Action	1984	Jay Chattaway	1000 units		
ISC Vol. 092	The Way West	1967	Bronislau Kaper	1200 units		
ISC Vol. 093	Braddock: Missing in Action III	1988	Jay Chattaway	1000 units		
ISC Vol. 094	Honey, I Shrunk the Kids	1989	James Horner	3000 units		
ISC Vol. 095	Something Wicked This Way Comes	1983	James Horner	3000 units	2009	
ISC Vol. 096	Uncle Joe Shannon	1978	Bill Conti	1000 units		
ISC Vol. 097	One Little Indian	1973	Jerry Goldsmith	3000 units		Re-issue as ISC Vol. 383
ISC Vol. 098	Memories of Me	1988	Georges Delerue	1000 units	2009-03-30	
ISC Vol. 099	The Girl in the Red Velvet Swing / The St. Valentine's Day Massacre	1955 / 1967	Leigh Harline / Fred Steiner	1000 units		
ISC Vol. 100	In Harm's Way	1965	Jerry Goldsmith	3000 units		
ISC Vol. 101	The True Story of Jesse James / The Last Wagon	1957 / 1956	Leigh Harline / Lionel Newman	1200 units		
ISC Vol. 102	Flight from Ashiya	1964	Frank Cordell	1000 units		
ISC Vol. 103	The Journey of Natty Gann	1985	James Horner	2500 units		
ISC Vol. 104	Last Embrace	1979	Miklos Rozsa	2000 units		
ISC Vol. 105	Black Widow / Good Morning, Miss Dove	1954 / 1955	Leigh Harline	1000 units		
ISC Vol. 106	Dangerous Crossing / Pickup on South Street	1953 / 1953	Lionel Newman / Leigh Harline	1200 units		
ISC Vol. 107	The Black Stallion (3-CD-Set)	1979	Carmine Coppola	1500 units		
ISC Vol. 108	Rent-a-Cop	1988	Jerry Goldsmith	3000 units		
ISC Vol. 109	Mr. Majestyk	1974	Charles Bernstein	1200 units	NA	
ISC Vol. 110	The China Syndrome	1979	Michael Small	1000 units		
ISC Vol. 111	House of Cards	1993	James Horner	1500 units	2009-10-12	
ISC Vol. 112	The Big Sleep	1978	Jerry Fielding	1500 units	2009-11-09	
ISC Vol. 113	Fixed Bayonets! / What Price Glory? / The Desert Rats	1951 / 1952 / 1953	Roy Webb / Alfred Newman / Leigh Harline	1200 units		
ISC Vol. 114	Gray Lady Down	1978	Jerry Fielding	2000 units	2009-11-09	
ISC Vol. 115	Players	1979	Jerry Goldsmith	3000 units		
ISC Vol. 116	Back to the Future (2-CD-Set)	1985	Alan Silvestri	10000 units	2009-11-24	
ISC Vol. 117	The Black Stallion Returns	1983	Georges Delerue	1500 units		
ISC Vol. 118	Hellfighters	1968	Leonard Rosenman	2000 units		
ISC Vol. 119	The Entity	1983	Charles Bernstein	1200 units		
ISC Vol. 120	The Blue Max	1966	Jerry Goldsmith	2500 units		
ISC Vol. 121	The Andromeda Strain	1971	Gil Melle	1500 units		
ISC Vol. 122	The Day of the Locust	1975	John Barry	2000 units		re-issued as ISC Vol. 367
ISC Vol. 123	Meet the Applegates	1991	David Newman & David Feinman	1000 units		
ISC Vol. 124	The Hawaiians (2-CD-Set)	1970	Henry Mancini	1500 units		
ISC Vol. 125	Billie / Popi	1965 / 1969	Dominic Frontiere	1000 units		
ISC Vol. 126	Straw Dogs	1971	Jerry Fielding	2000 units	2010-03-29	
ISC Vol. 127	A Child Is Waiting	1963	Ernest Gold	1000 units		
ISC Vol. 128	Jack the Giant Killer (2-CD-Set)	1962	Paul Sawtell & Bert Shefter	1000 units		
ISC Vol. 129	RoboCop	1987	Basil Poledouris	3000 units		
ISC Vol. 130	The Miracle Worker	1962	Laurence Rosenthal	1000 units		
ISC Vol. 131	White Lightning	1973	Charles Bernstein	1000 units		
ISC Vol. 132	The Beast Within	1982	Les Baxter	1000 units		
ISC Vol. 133	99 44/100% Dead!	1974	Henry Mancini	1200 units		
ISC Vol. 134	These Thousand Hills / The Proud Ones	1959 / 1956	Leigh Harline / Lionel Newman	1200 units		
ISC Vol. 135	Cloak & Dagger	1984	Brian May	1500 units		
ISC Vol. 136	The Black Bird	1975	Jerry Fielding	1500 units	2010-07-05	
ISC Vol. 137	Maxie	1985	Georges Delerue	1200 units	2010-07-19	
ISC Vol. 138	The Mean Season	1985	Lalo Schifrin	1200 units	2010-07-19	
ISC Vol. 139	Cohen and Tate	1988	Bill Conti	1200 units	2010-08-17	
ISC Vol. 140	SpaceCamp	1986	John Williams	3000 units	2010-08-17	
ISC Vol. 141	Predator	1987	Alan Silvestri	3000 units	2010-08-02	
ISC Vol. 142	Uncommon Valor	1983	James Horner	3000 units	2010-09-27	
ISC Vol. 143	The Deep (2-CD-Set)	1977	John Barry	3000 units	2010-08-31	
ISC Vol. 144	The Organization	1971	Gil Melle	1000 units	2010-09-13	
ISC Vol. 145	The Brotherhood of the Bell / A Step Out Of Line	1970	Jerry Goldsmith	2500 units	2010-09-13	
ISC Vol. 146	The War Wagon	1967	Dimitri Tiomkin	2000 units	2010-10-11	
ISC Vol. 147	Tobruk	1967	Bronislau Kaper	2000 units	2010-10-11	
ISC Vol. 148	A Raisin in the Sun / Requiem for a Heavyweight	1961 / 1962	Laurence Rosenthal	1500 units	2010-10-25	
ISC Vol. 149	Gator	1976	Charles Bernstein	1200 units	2010-11-08	
ISC Vol. 150	Clash of the Titans (2-CD-Set)	1981	Laurence Rosenthal	3000 units	2010-12-13	
ISC Vol. 151	Navy Seals	1990	Sylvester Levay	1200 units	2010-12-13	
ISC Vol. 152	On the Threshold of Space / The Hunters	1956 / 1958	Lyn Murray / Paul Sawtell	1000 units	2010-12-13	
ISC Vol. 153	Flesh+Blood	1985	Basil Poledouris	2000 units	2010-12-13	
ISC Vol. 154	Battlestar Galactica Vol. 1	1978	Stu Phillips	3000 units	2011-02-07	
ISC Vol. 155	48 Hrs.	1982	James Horner	5000 units	2011-01-10	
ISC Vol. 156	Cliffhanger (2-CD-Set)	1993	Trevor Jones	2000 units	2011-02-21	
ISC Vol. 157	River of No Return / Niagara	1954 / 1953	Lionel Newman, Leigh Harline, Cyril J. Mockridge / Sol Kaplan	1000 units	2011-01-24	
ISC Vol. 158	Link	1986	Jerry Goldsmith	2000 units	2011-01-24	
ISC Vol. 159	House of Usher	1959	Les Baxter	1200 units	2011-02-07	
ISC Vol. 160	The Kremlin Letter	1970	Robert Drasnin	1000 units	2011-02-21	
ISC Vol. 161	Those Magnificent Men in their Flying Machines (2-CD-Set)	1965	Ron Goodwin	2000 units	2011-03-07	
ISC Vol. 162	Wrongfully Accused	1998	Bill Conti	1500 units	2011-03-07	
ISC Vol. 163	Trail of the Pink Panther	1982	Henry Mancini	1200 units	2011-03-22	
ISC Vol. 164	Ravagers	1979	Fred Karlin	3000 units	2011-04-18	
ISC Vol. 165	Sleuth	1972	John Addison	1500 units	2011-05-02	
ISC Vol. 166	Exposed	1983	Georges Delerue	1000 units	2011-03-22	
ISC Vol. 167	Stay Tuned	1992	Bruce Broughton	1500 units	2011-04-18	
ISC Vol. 168	Two Flags West / North to Alaska	1950 / 1960	Hugo Friedhofer / Lionel Newman	1000 units	2011-04-05	
ISC Vol. 169	Destination Gobi	1953	Sol Kaplan	1000 units	2011-05-02	
ISC Vol. 170	City of Fear	1959	Jerry Goldsmith	2000 units	2011-05-17	
ISC Vol. 171	Masada (2-CD-Set)	1981	Jerry Goldsmith & Morton Stevens	5000 units	2011-06-01	
ISC Vol. 172	The Moneychangers (2-CD-Set)	1976	Henry Mancini	1500 units	2011-07-25	
ISC Vol. 173	Shoot to Kill	1988	John Scott	1500 units	2011-06-27	
ISC Vol. 174	Cherry 2000 / The House of God	1987 / 1984	Basil Poledouris	1500 units	2011-06-11	
ISC Vol. 175	Déjà Vu	1985	Pino Donaggio	1000 units	2011-07-11	
ISC Vol. 176	The House on Telegraph Hill / Ten North Frederick	1951 / 1958	Sol Kaplan / Leigh Harline	1000 units	2011-07-11	
ISC Vol. 177	Remo Williams: The Adventure Begins	1985	Craig Safan	1000 units	2011-07-25	
ISC Vol. 178	Battlestar Galactica Vol. 2 (2-CD-Set)	1978	Stu Phillips	1500 units	2011-08-23	
ISC Vol. 179	Squanto: A Warrior's Tale	1994	Joel McNeely	1500 units	2011-08-08	
ISC Vol. 180	Explorers	1985	Jerry Goldsmith	Limited Ed.	2011-09-07	
ISC Vol. 181	Young Guns II	1990	Alan Silvestri	Limited Ed.	2011-09-19	
ISC Vol. 182	Rampage	1963	Elmer Bernstein	Limited Ed.	2011-10-03	
ISC Vol. 183	Fright Night	1985	Brad Fiedel	Limited Ed.	2011-10-18	
ISC Vol. 184	It (2-CD-Set)	1990	Richard Bellis	Limited Ed.	2011-11-14	
ISC Vol. 185	Wolfen	1981	James Horner	Limited Ed.	2011-11-28	
ISC Vol. 186	Funeral Home	1980	Jerry Fielding	Limited Ed.	2011-10-18	
ISC Vol. 187	The Core (2-CD-Set)	2003	Christopher Young	Limited Ed.	2011-11-01	
ISC Vol. 188	Rapture	1965	Georges Delerue	Limited Ed.	2011-11-01	
ISC Vol. 189	White Fang (2-CD-Set)	1991	Basil Poledouris & Hans Zimmer	Limited Ed.	2012-03-19	
ISC Vol. 190	Road House	1989	Michael Kamen	Limited Ed.	2012-01-20	
ISC Vol. 191	The Wrong Box	1966	John Barry	Limited Ed.	2011-12-12	
ISC Vol. 192	Renegades	1989	Michael Kamen	Limited Ed.	2012-01-11	
ISC Vol. 193	The Island at the Top of the World	1974	Maurice Jarre	Limited Ed.	2012-03-06	
ISC Vol. 194	Borderline	1980	Gil Melle	Limited Ed.	2012-02-14	
ISC Vol. 195	A Troll in Central Park	1995	Robert Folk	Limited Ed.	2012-02-14	
ISC Vol. 196	Sir Gawain and the Green Knight (2-CD-Set)	1973	Ron Goodwin	Limited Ed.	2012-03-06	
ISC Vol. 197	The Postman Always Rings Twice	1981	Michael Small	Limited Ed.	2012-05-14	
ISC Vol. 198	2 Days in the Valley (rejected score)	1996	Jerry Goldsmith	Limited Ed.	2012-06-11	
ISC Vol. 199	Whispers in the Dark	1992	Thomas Newman	Limited Ed.	2012-04-16	
ISC Vol. 200	Hatari!	1962	Henry Mancini	Limited Ed.	2012-05-28	
ISC Vol. 201	The Quiller Memorandum	1966	John Barry	Limited Ed.	2012-07-10	
ISC Vol. 202	The War of the Worlds / When Worlds Collide / The Naked Jungle / Conquest of Space (2-CD-Set)	1953 / 1951 / 1954 / 1955	Leith Stevens / Daniele Amfitheatrof / Nathan Van Cleave	Limited Ed.	2012-07-10	
ISC Vol. 203	Love at First Bite	1979	Charles Bernstein	Limited Ed.	2012-06-26	
ISC Vol. 204	The Shadow (2-CD-Set)	1994	Jerry Goldsmith	Limited Ed.	2012-07-24	
ISC Vol. 205	Masters of the Universe	1987	Bill Conti	Limited Ed.	2012-06-26	
ISC Vol. 206	Wolfen (Unused Score)	1981	Craig Safan	Limited Ed.	2012-07-24	
ISC Vol. 207	North by Northwest	1959	Bernard Herrmann	Limited Ed.	2012-08-09	
ISC Vol. 208	The Last Flight of Noah's Ark	1980	Maurice Jarre	Limited Ed.	2012-08-20	
ISC Vol. 209	The Mountain Men	1980	Michel Legrand	Limited Ed.	2012-09-17	
ISC Vol. 210	Battlestar Galactica, Vol. 3 (2-CD-Set)	1978-1979	Stu Phillips	Limited Ed.	2012-09-03	
ISC Vol. 211	The Jayhawkers!	1959	Jerome Moross	Limited Ed.	2012-09-03	
ISC Vol. 212	Strange Invaders	1983	John Addison	Limited Ed.	2012-08-20	
ISC Vol. 213	Posse / The Last Tycoon	1975 / 1976	Maurice Jarre	Limited Ed.	2012-10-29	
ISC Vol. 214	King Kong Lives	1986	John Scott	Limited Ed.	2012-10-01	
ISC Vol. 215	Black Sabbath	1964	Les Baxter	Limited Ed.	2012-10-15	
ISC Vol. 216	Bound for Glory	1976	Leonard Rosenman	Limited Ed.	2012-09-17	
ISC Vol. 217	High Plains Drifter	1972	Dee Barton	Limited Ed.	2012-10-01	
ISC Vol. 218	The Comedy of Terrors	1963	Les Baxter	Limited Ed.	2012-10-15	
ISC Vol. 219	Condorman	1981	Henry Mancini	Limited Ed.	2012-11-13	
ISC Vol. 220	Congo	1995	Jerry Goldsmith	Limited Ed.	2013-01-08	
ISC Vol. 221	Hush	1998	Christopher Young	Limited Ed.	2012-11-12	
ISC Vol. 222	Battlestar Galactica, Vol. 4 (2-CD-Set)	1978-1979	Stu Phillips	Limited Ed.	2012-11-13	
ISC Vol. 223	Coogan's Bluff	1968	Lalo Schifrin	Limited Ed.	2012-11-26	
ISC Vol. 224	The Last Hard Men	1976	Leonard Rosenman & Jerry Goldsmith	Limited Ed.	2012-12-10	
ISC Vol. 225	Bride of Vengeance / Captain Carey, U.S.A.	1949 / 1950	Hugo Friedhofer	Limited Ed.	2012-12-10	
ISC Vol. 226	Hoosiers	1986	Jerry Goldsmith	Limited Ed.	2012-12-10	
ISC Vol. 227	Flight of the Intruder	1991	Basil Poledouris	Limited Ed.	2013-01-21	
ISC Vol. 228	Cromwell (2-CD-Set)	1976	Frank Cordell	Limited Ed.	2013-01-08	
ISC Vol. 229	Cahill: United States Marshal	1973	Elmer Bernstein	Limited Ed.	2013-02-04	
ISC Vol. 230	In Country	1989	James Horner	Limited Ed.	2013-02-18	
ISC Vol. 231	Gladiator (rejected score)	1992	Jerry Goldsmith	Limited Ed.	2013-02-18	
ISC Vol. 232	Von Ryan's Express / The Detective	1965 / 1968	Jerry Goldsmith	Limited Ed.		
ISC Vol. 233	The Carpetbaggers	1964	Elmer Bernstein	Limited Ed.		
ISC Vol. 234	Joe Kidd	1972	Lalo Schifrin	Limited Ed.	2013-01-21	
ISC Vol. 235	Seven Days in May / The Mackintosh Man	1964 / 1973	Jerry Goldsmith / Maurice Jarre	Limited Ed.		
ISC Vol. 236	Hell Is for Heroes / Escape from Alcatraz	1962 / 1979	Leonard Rosenman / Jerry Fielding	Limited Ed.	2013-02-04	
ISC Vol. 237	Shock Treatment / Fate Is the Hunter	1964 / 1964	Jerry Goldsmith	Limited Ed.		
ISC Vol. 238	Those Calloways	1965	Max Steiner	Limited Ed.		
ISC Vol. 239	Bad Boys	1983	Bill Conti	Limited Ed.		
ISC Vol. 240	Five Days from Home	1979	Bill Conti	Limited Ed.		
ISC Vol. 241	Fire Birds	1990	David Newman	Limited Ed.		
ISC Vol. 242	Days of Wine and Roses	1962	Henry Mancini	Limited Ed.		
ISC Vol. 243	The Miracle (2-CD-Set)	1959	Elmer Bernstein	Limited Ed.	2013-09-30	
ISC Vol. 244	Then Came Bronson (2-CD-Set)	1969	George Durning & others	Limited Ed.		
ISC Vol. 245	Beyond the Poseidon Adventure	1979	Jerry Fielding	Limited Ed.	2013-05-27	
ISC Vol. 246	Dressed to Kill - Expandet Edition	1980	Pino Donaggio	Limited Ed.		Remastered Re-issue as ISC Vol. 360
ISC Vol. 247	Clear and Present Danger (2-CD-Set)	1994	James Horner	Limited Ed.		
ISC Vol. 248	Dreamscape	1984	Maurice Jarre	Limited Ed.		
ISC Vol. 249	Fandango	1985	Alan Silvestri	Limited Ed.		
ISC Vol. 250	Sebastian	1968	Jerry Goldsmith	Limited Ed.	2013-09-02	
ISC Vol. 251	Paradise / Can't Buy Me Love	1991 / 1987	David Newman / Robert Folk	Limited Ed.	2013-08-19	
ISC Vol. 252	The Thanksgiving Promise	1986	Bruce Broughton	Limited Ed.	2013-11-11	
ISC Vol. 253	The White Dawn	1974	Henry Mancini	Limited Ed.	2013-09-16	
ISC Vol. 254	Hocus Pocus	1993	John Debney	Limited Ed.	2013-09-30	
ISC Vol. 255	Buck Rogers in the 25th Century - Season One (3-CD-Set)	1979-1980	Stu Phillips & Glen A. Larson & John Harris & Les Baxter & Richard LaSalle	Limited Ed.	2013-10-15	
ISC Vol. 256	Salem's Lot (2-CD-Set)	1979	Harry Sukman	Limited Ed.	2013-10-15	
ISC Vol. 257	The Hunt for Red October	1990	Basil Poledouris	Limited Ed.	2013-10-28	
ISC Vol. 258	So I Married an Axe Murderer	1993	Bruce Broughton	Limited Ed.	2013-11-25	
ISC Vol. 259	Prancer	1989	Maurice Jarre	Limited Ed.	2013-11-11	
ISC Vol. 260	Cocoon	1985	James Horner	Limited Ed.	2013-10-11	
ISC Vol. 261	The Young Savages	1961	David Amram	Limited Ed.	2014-01-07	
ISC Vol. 262	Elmer Bernstein - The AVA Collection (3-CD-Set)	1962 / 1963 / 1964 / 1965	Elmer Bernstein	Limited Ed.	2014-01-18	
ISC Vol. 263	Transformers: The Movie	1986	Vince DiCola	Limited Ed.	2014-01-07	
ISC Vol. 264	Blown Away	1994	Alan Silvestri	Limited Ed.	2013-12-10	
ISC Vol. 265	Falling Down	1993	James Newton Howard	Limited Ed.	2014-01-21	
ISC Vol. 266	The Bridges at Toko-Ri / To Catch a Thief	1954 / 1955	Lyn Murray	Limited Ed.	2014-01-21	
ISC Vol. 267	Meteor	1979	Laurence Rosenthal	Limited Ed.	2014-02-04	
ISC Vol. 268	Necessary Roughness	1991	Bill Conti	Limited Ed.	2014-02-04	
ISC Vol. 269	Bill & Ted's Excellent Adventure	1989	David Newman	Limited Ed.	2014-06-23	
ISC Vol. 270	Once Is Not Enough	1975	Henry Mancini	Limited Ed.	2014-03-18	
ISC Vol. 271	Distant Thunder	1988	Maurice Jarre	Limited Ed.	2014-02-18	
ISC Vol. 272	The Spy Who Came In from the Cold	1965	Sol Kaplan	Limited Ed.	2014-03-18	
ISC Vol. 273	Psycho II	1983	Jerry Goldsmith	Limited Ed.	2014-04-01	
ISC Vol. 274	The Meteor Man	1993	Cliff Eidelman	Limited Ed.	2014-03-04	
ISC Vol. 275	Child's Play / First Born	1972 / 1984	Michael Small	Limited Ed.	2014-04-15	
ISC Vol. 276	The Rescue	1988	Bruce Broughton	Limited Ed.	2014-04-28	
ISC Vol. 277	Judith	1966	Sol Kaplan	Limited Ed.	2014-05-12	
ISC Vol. 278	Deep Rising	1998	Jerry Goldsmith	Limited Ed.	2014-06-10	
ISC Vol. 279	Crawlspace	1986	Pino Donaggio	Limited Ed.	2014-06-23	
ISC Vol. 280	Night Crossing	1982	Jerry Goldsmith	Limited Ed.	2014-05-26	
ISC Vol. 281	Solar Crisis	1990	Maurice Jarre	Limited Ed.	2014-05-12	
ISC Vol. 282	Die Sister, Die!	1972	Hugo Friedhofer	Limited Ed.	2014-07-08	
ISC Vol. 283	Her Alibi	1989	Georges Delerue	Limited Ed.	2014-08-05	
ISC Vol. 284	Decision for Chemistry + Sounder	1953 / 1972	Alex North	Limited Ed.	2014-07-08	
ISC Vol. 285	Buck Rogers in the 25th Century - Season TWO (4-CD-Set)	1980-1981	Stu Phillips & Glen A. Larson & Bruce Broughton & John Cacavas & Herbert Don Woods	Limited Ed.	2014-08-05	
ISC Vol. 286	Summer of '42 / The Picasso Summer (2-CD-Set)	1971 / 1969	Michel Legrand	Limited Ed.	2014-10-14	
ISC Vol. 287	Blow Out	1981	Pino Donaggio	Limited Ed.	2014-08-19	
ISC Vol. 288	Wild Harvest / No Man of Her Own / Thunder in the East	1947 / 1950 / 1952	Hugo Friedhofer	Limited Ed.	2014-10-28	
ISC Vol. 289	Gorky Park	1983	James Horner	Limited Ed.	2014-09-01	
ISC Vol. 290	The Other Side of Midnight	1977	Michel Legrand	Limited Ed.	2014-09-01	
ISC Vol. 291	Robo Warriors	1996	Richard Band	Limited Ed.	2014-10-28	
ISC Vol. 292	Themes from the General Electric Theater	1959	Elmer Bernstein	Limited Ed.	2014-09-16	
ISC Vol. 293	See No Evil	1971	Elmer Bernstein	Limited Ed.	2014-09-16	
ISC Vol. 294	Our Man Flint / In Like Flint	1966 / 1967	Jerry Goldsmith	Limited Ed.	2014-10-14	
ISC Vol. 295	The Boy Who Could Fly	1986	Bruce Broughton	Limited Ed.	2015-01-05	
ISC Vol. 296	Funeral in Berlin	1966	Konrad Elfers	Limited Ed.	2014-11-17	
ISC Vol. 297	My Science Project	1985	Peter Bernstein	Limited Ed.	2014-11-10	
ISC Vol. 298	The Presidio	1988	Bruce Broughton	Limited Ed.	2014-11-10	
ISC Vol. 299	Mandingo / Plaza Suite	1975 / 1971	Maurice Jarre	Limited Ed.	2014-11-17	
ISC Vol. 300	Rio Bravo (2-CD-Set)	1959	Dimitri Tiomkin	Limited Ed.	2015-02-16	
ISC Vol. 301	The River Wild (2-CD-Set)	1994	Jerry Goldsmith, Maurice Jarre	Limited Ed.	2015-01-19	
ISC Vol. 302	The Journey Inside	1994	David Shire	Limited Ed.	2015-01-19	
ISC Vol. 303	A Far Off Place	1993	James Horner	Limited Ed.	2014-12-08	Expd. Reissue of MAF 7042D
ISC Vol. 304	Queenie	1987	Georges Delerue	Limited Ed.	2014-12-08	
ISC Vol. 305	Duel	1971	Billy Goldenberg	Limited Ed.	2015-03-02	
ISC Vol. 306	The Car	1977	Leonard Rosenman	Limited Ed.	2015-03-02	
ISC Vol. 307	Jaws: The Revenge	1987	Michael Small	Limited Ed.	2015-02-02	
ISC Vol. 308	Going Ape!	1981	Elmer Bernstein	Limited Ed.	2015-03-16	
ISC Vol. 309	Escape to Witch Mountain	1975	Johnny Mandel	Limited Ed.	2015-02-16	
ISC Vol. 310	Warlock	1989	Jerry Goldsmith	Limited Ed.	2015-03-16	Expd. Reissue of MAF 7003D
ISC Vol. 311	Old Boyfriends	1979	David Shire	Limited Ed.	2015-04-13	
ISC Vol. 312	The Ghost and the Darkness (2-CD-Set)	1996	Jerry Goldsmith	Limited Ed.	2015-04-27	
ISC Vol. 313	The Dove	1974	John Barry	Limited Ed.	2015-03-30	
ISC Vol. 314	The Return of a Man Called Horse / Inherit the Wind (2-CD-Set)	1976 / 1999	Laurence Rosenthal	Limited Ed.	2015-03-30	
ISC Vol. 315	Red Eye	2005	Marco Beltrami	Limited Ed.	2015-04-13	
ISC Vol. 316	Judge Dredd (2-CD-Set)	1995	Alan Silvestri	Limited Ed.	2015-05-11	
ISC Vol. 317	Indecent Proposal	1993	John Barry	Limited Ed.	2015-06-09	
ISC Vol. 318	Coneheads / Talent for the Game	1993 / 1991	David Newman	Limited Ed.	2015-04-27	
ISC Vol. 319	Return to Oz (2-CD-Set)	1985	David Shire	Limited Ed.	2015-05-11	
ISC Vol. 320	Adventures in Babysitting	1987	Michael Kamen	Limited Ed.	2015-06-22	
ISC Vol. 321	The Lost Weekend	1945	Miklós Rózsa	Limited Ed.	2015-06-09	
ISC Vol. 322	Jaws 3-D (2-CD-Set)	1983	Alan Parker	Limited Ed.	2015-05-25	
ISC Vol. 323	Killing Season	2013	Christopher Young	Limited Ed.	2015- -	
ISC Vol. 324	The Aviator	1985	Dominic Frontiere	Limited Ed.	2015-06-22	
ISC Vol. 325	Agent Cody Banks	2003	John Powell	Limited Ed.	2015-07-06	
ISC Vol. 326	Candleshoe	1977	Ron Goodwin	Limited Ed.	2015-09-14	
ISC Vol. 327	The Trouble with Angels	1966	Jerry Goldsmith	Limited Ed.	2015-07-06	
ISC Vol. 328	Cat's Eye	1985	Alan Silvestri	Limited Ed.	2015-07-20	
ISC Vol. 329	Desert Fury	1947	Miklos Rozsa	Limited Ed.	2015-08-03	
ISC Vol. 330	Homeward Bound: The Incredible Journey	1993	Bruce Broughton	Limited Ed.	2015-08-03	Expd. Reissue of MAF 7041D
ISC Vol. 331	Jaws 2 (2-CD-Set)	1978	John Williams	Limited Ed.	2015-11-09	Expd. Reissue of VSD-5328
ISC Vol. 332	The Secret of NIMH	1982	Jerry Goldsmith	Limited Ed.	2015-08-17	
ISC Vol. 333	The Heroes of Telemark / Stagecoach	1965 / 1966	Malcolm Arnold / Jerry Goldsmith	Limited Ed.	2015-08-31	
ISC Vol. 334	I'll Follow You Down	2013	Andrew Lockington	Limited Ed.	2015-08-17	
ISC Vol. 335	Double Indemnity: Film Noir at Paramount (2CD)	1944-1956	Miklos Rozsa, Hugo Friedhofer, Gail Kubik, Heinz Roemheld, Franz Waxman, Leith Stevens & Victor Young	Limited Ed.	2015-12-07	
ISC Vol. 336	Back to the Future Part II	1989	Alan Silvestri	Limited Ed.	2015-10-12	
ISC Vol. 337	Something Wicked This Way Comes (rejected score)	1983	Georges Delerue	Limited Ed.	2015-12-07	
ISC Vol. 338	The Monkey King	2014	Christopher Young	Limited Ed.	2015-12-07	
ISC Vol. 339	Abulele	2015	Frank Ilfman	Limited Ed.	2016-03-14	
ISC Vol. 340	Lost in Space	1998	Bruce Broughton	Limited Ed.	2016-02-29	Expd. Reissue of MAF 7086
ISC Vol. 341	The Setting Sun	1992	Maurice Jarre	Limited Ed.	2016-01-04	
ISC Vol. 342	Cujo	1983	Charles Bernstein	Limited Ed.	2016-01-18	
ISC Vol. 343	Unidentified Flying Oddball	1979	Ron Goodwin	Limited Ed.	2016-01-04	
ISC Vol. 344	Bunny Lake Is Missing	1965	Paul Glass	Limited Ed.	2016-01-18	
ISC Vol. 345	Hatchet III	2013	Scott Glasgow	Limited Ed.	2016-02-01	
ISC Vol. 346	The Rescuers Down Under	1990	Bruce Broughton	Limited Ed.	2016-02-15	
ISC Vol. 347	Siddharth	2013	Andrew Lockington	Limited Ed.	2016-02-15	
ISC Vol. 348	The Twilight Zone (3-CD-Set)	1985-87	Basil Poledouris, Christopher Young, Craig Safan, Fred Steiner, Dennis McCarthy and others	Limited Ed.	2016-02-29	
ISC Vol. 349	The Golden Voyage of Sinbad (2CD)	1973	Miklos Rozsa	Limited Ed.	2016-03-14	
ISC Vol. 350	Chinatown	1974	Jerry Goldsmith	Limited Ed.	2016-05-16	
ISC Vol. 351	Powder	1995	Jerry Goldsmith	Limited Ed.	2016-03-28	
ISC Vol. 352	Collateral	2004	James Newton Howard	Limited Ed.	2016-05-02	
ISC Vol. 353	Hurry Sundown	1967	Hugo Montenegro	Limited Ed.	2016-05-02	
ISC Vol. 354	Homeward Bound II	1967	Bruce Broughton	Limited Ed.	2016-05-16	
ISC Vol. 355	Five Graves to Cairo / So Proudly We Hail!	1943	Miklos Rozsa	Limited Ed.	2016-05-30	
ISC Vol. 356	Trancers I - II - III (2CD)	1984/91/92	Richard Band & others	Limited Ed.	2016-05-30	
ISC Vol. 357	The Rocketeer (2CD)	1991	James Horner	Limited Ed.	2016-06-27	
ISC Vol. 358	The Monkey King 2	2016	Christopher Young	Limited Ed.	2016-07-11	
ISC Vol. 359	Delta Force 2	1990	Frederic Talgorn	Limited Ed.	2016-07-25	
ISC Vol. 360	Dressed to Kill	1980	Pino Donaggio	Limited Ed.	2016-08-22	Remastered Re-issue of ISC Vol. 246
ISC Vol. 361	Arena	1989	Richard Band	Limited Ed.	2016-09-05	
ISC Vol. 362	Cheyenne Autumn (2CD)	1964	Alex North	Limited Ed.	2016-10-03	
ISC Vol. 363	Dick Tracy (2CD)	1990	Danny Elfman	Limited Ed.	2016-11-14	
ISC Vol. 364	The Haunted Mansion	2003	Mark Mancina	Limited Ed.	2016-10-17	
ISC Vol. 365	The Blue Lagoon	1980	Basil Poledouris	Limited Ed.	2016-11-14	
ISC Vol. 366	All I Want for Christmas	1991	Bruce Broughton	Limited Ed.	2016-11-28	
ISC Vol. 367	The Day of the Locust	1975	John Barry	Limited Ed.	2016-10-31	Expanded Re-issue of ISC Vol. 122
ISC Vol. 368	Return to the Blue Lagoon	1991	Basil Poledouris	Limited Ed.	2016-11-28	
ISC Vol. 369	Silent Running	1972	Peter Schickele	Limited Ed.	2016-11-28	
ISC Vol. 370	Poltergeist II: The Other Side	1986	Jerry Goldsmith	Limited Ed.	2017-05-15	Expanded Re-issue of VJF 5002D
ISC Vol. 371	Sky High	2005	Michael Giacchino	Limited Ed.	2017-01-09	
ISC Vol. 372	DuckTales the Movie: Treasure of the Lost Lamp	1990	David Newman	Limited Ed.	2017-02-06	
ISC Vol. 373	The Red Pony / The Heiress	1949	Aaron Copland	Limited Ed.	2017-01-23	
ISC Vol. 374	Stargate SG-1: Music from Selected Episodes	1997	Richard Band	Limited Ed.	2017-06-26	
ISC Vol. 375	The Hustler	1961	Kenyon Hopkins	Limited Ed.	2017-02-20	
ISC Vol. 376	Palm Springs Weekend	1963	Frank Perkins	Limited Ed.	2017-05-01	
ISC Vol. 377	Baby's Day Out	1994	Bruce Broughton	Limited Ed.	2017-03-06	
ISC Vol. 378	From Beyond	1986	Richard Band	Limited Ed.	2017-04-03	
ISC Vol. 379	Race with the Devil / Making Love	1975/1982	Leonard Rosenman	Limited Ed.	2017-03-20	
ISC Vol. 380	Troy (2CD)	2004	James Horner	Limited Ed.	2017-10-02	
ISC Vol. 381	Cosmos: A Spacetime Odyssey Vol. 1	2014	Alan Silvestri	Limited Ed.	2017-06-12	
ISC Vol. 382	The Caine Mutiny	1954	Max Steiner	Limited Ed.	2017-05-29	
ISC Vol. 383	One Little Indian	1973	Jerry Goldsmith	Limited Ed.	2017-07-24	Re-issue of ISC Vol. 097
ISC Vol. 384	Good Morning, Vietnam / Operation Dumbo Drop	1987/1995	Alex North, David Newman	Limited Ed.	2017-07-10	
ISC Vol. 385	Honey, I Blew Up the Kid	1992	Bruce Broughton	Limited Ed.	2017-09-04	
ISC Vol. 386	Cosmos: A SpaceTime Odyssey Vol. 2	2014	Alan Silvestri	Limited Ed.	2017-08-21	
ISC Vol. 387	Body Double	1984	Pino Donaggio	Limited Ed.	2017-08-21	Re-issue of ISC Vol. 086
ISC Vol. 388	Cosmos: A SpaceTime Odyssey Vol. 3	2014	Alan Silvestri	Limited Ed.	2017-11-13	
ISC Vol. 389	Robot Jox	1989	Frederic Talgorn	Limited Ed.	2017-09-18	
ISC Vol. 390	Captains Courageous: The Franz Waxman Collection (4CD)	1936-1961	Franz Waxman	Limited Ed.	2017-12-04	
ISC Vol. 391	Mackenna's Gold / In Cold Blood	1969/67	Quincy Jones	Limited Ed.	2017-10-30	
ISC Vol. 392	Lady in White / Frankie Goes to Tuscany (2CD)	1988	Frank LaLoggia	Limited Ed.	2017-10-16	
ISC Vol. 393	TerrorVision	1986	Richard Band	500 units	2017-10-16	
ISC Vol. 394	Shogun (3CD)	1980	Maurice Jarre	Limited Ed.	2017-10-02	Expanded Re-issue of ISC Vol. 072
ISC Vol. 395	Robin Hood: Prince of Thieves (2CD)	1991	Michael Kamen	Limited Ed.	2018-01-08	
ISC Vol. 396	Damnation Alley	1977	Jerry Goldsmith	Limited Ed.	2017-12-04	
ISC Vol. 397	Who Framed Roger Rabbit/The Roger Rabbit Cartoons (3CD)	1988	Alan Silvestri, Bruce Broughton, James Horner	Limited Ed.	2018-01-22	
ISC Vol. 398	Cosmos: A SpaceTime Odyssey Vol. 4	2014	Alan Silvestri	Limited Ed.	2018-02-05	
ISC Vol. 399	Mickey, Donald, Goofy: The Three Musketeers	2004	Bruce Broughton	Limited Ed.	2018-03-19	
ISC Vol. 400	The Boy in the Striped Pyjamas	2008	James Horner	Limited Ed.	2018-04-16	
ISC Vol. 401	Living in the Age of Airplanes	2015	James Horner	Limited Ed.	2018-04-02	
ISC Vol. 402	The Mummy (2CD)	1999	Jerry Goldsmith	Limited Ed.	2018-07-16	
ISC Vol. 403	Baby: Secret of the Lost Legend	1985	Jerry Goldsmith	Limited Ed.	2018-05-14	Remastered re-issue of ISC Vol. 062
ISC Vol. 404	The Mummy Returns (2CD)	2001	Alan Silvestri	Limited Ed.	2018-07-16	
ISC Vol. 405	The Valley of Gwangi	1969	Jerome Moross	Limited Ed.	2018-05-28	
ISC Vol. 406	Harper	1966	Johnny Mandel	Limited Ed.	2018-05-01	
ISC Vol. 407	Another Stakeout	1993	Arthur B. Rubinstein	Limited Ed.	2018-10-15	
ISC Vol. 408	Remote	1993	Richard Band	Limited Ed.	2018-11-12	
ISC Vol. 409	Chato's Land	1972	Jerry Fielding	Limited Ed.	2019-07-01	Re-issue of ISC Vol. 058
ISC Vol. 410	The 10th Victim / That Man in Istanbul	1965	Piero Piccioni / Georges Garvarentz	Limited Ed.	2018-06-10	
ISC Vol. 411	Rocket Gibraltar	1988	Andrew Powell	Limited Ed.	2018-06-25	
ISC Vol. 412	*batteries not included	1987	James Horner	Limited Ed.	2018-09-17	
ISC Vol. 413	Ravenwolf Towers	2016	Richard Band	Limited Ed.	2018-08-20	
ISC Vol. 414	Balto	1995	James Horner	Limited Ed.	2018-10-29	
ISC Vol. 415	Apollo 13 (2CD)	1995	James Horner	Limited Ed.	2019-01-14	
ISC Vol. 416	The Lonely Guy	1984	Jerry Goldsmith	Limited Ed.	2018-09-03	
ISC Vol. 417	Nate and Hayes (2CD)	1983	Trevor Jones	Limited Ed.	2018-08-06	
ISC Vol. 418	Sin of Innocence / Love Thy Neighbor	1986 / 1984	Georges Delerue	Limited Ed.	2018-10-29	
ISC Vol. 419	Prehysteria!	1993	Richard Band	Limited Ed.	2018-10-01	
ISC Vol. 420	The Legend of the Lone Ranger	1981	John Barry	Limited Ed.	2018-11-12	
ISC Vol. 421	The Reincarnation of Peter Proud	1975	Jerry Goldsmith	Limited Ed.	2018-12-03	
ISC Vol. 422	Lawman	1971	Jerry Fielding	Limited Ed.	2019-05-20	Remastered re-issue of ISC Vol. 017
ISC Vol. 423	An American Tail	1986	James Horner	Limited Ed.	2019-02-11	
ISC Vol. 424	Hider in the House	1991	Richard Band	Limited Ed.	2018-12-03	Re-issue of MAF 7007D
ISC Vol. 425	Johnny Tremain	1957	George Bruns	Limited Ed.	2019-02-25	
ISC Vol. 426	Howard the Duck (3CD)	1986	John Barry / Sylvester Levay	Limited Ed.	2019-09-23	
ISC Vol. 427	Iron Will	1994	Joel McNeely	Limited Ed.	2019-04-22	
ISC Vol. 428	Son of the Morning Star (2CD)	1991	Craig Safan	Limited Ed.	2019-04-08	Expanded re-release of MAF 7037D
ISC Vol. 429	Young Sherlock Holmes (3CD)	1985	Bruce Broughton	Limited Ed.	2019-07-22	Expanded re-release of MAF 7131
ISC Vol. 430	Monsignor	1982	John Williams	Limited Ed.	2019-06-03	Expanded re-release of ISC Vol. 051
ISC Vol. 431	Virtuosity	1995	Christopher Young	Limited Ed.	2019-07-25	
ISC Vol. 432	Unlucky Charms	2013	Richard Band	Limited Ed.	2019-06-03	
ISC Vol. 433	Downhill Racer	1969	Kenyon Hopkins	Limited Ed.	2019-08-26	
ISC Vol. 434	King Rat	1965	John Barry	Limited Ed.	2019-09-23	
ISC Vol. 435	Return from Witch Mountain	1978	Lalo Schifrin	Limited Ed.	2019-12-02	
ISC Vol. 436	The Amazing Mr. Blunden	1972	Elmer Bernstein	Limited Ed.	2019-10-07	
ISC Vol. 437	Alive (2CD)	1993	James Newton Howard	Limited Ed.	2019-01-13	
ISC Vol. 438	The Power and the Glory	1961	Laurence Rosenthal	Limited Ed.	2020-01-27	
ISC Vol. 439	The Young Lions (2CD)	1958	Hugo Friedhofer	Limited Ed.	2020-06-22	
ISC Vol. 440	Time Bandits	1981	Mike Moran	Limited Ed.	2020-02-10	
ISC Vol. 441	The River	1984	John Williams	Limited Ed.	2020-05-04	
ISC Vol. 442	The Collector / David & Lisa	1965/62	Maurice Jarre / Mark Lawrence	Limited Ed.	2020-02-24	
ISC Vol. 443	Legends of the Fall (2CD)	1994	James Horner	Limited Ed.	2020-04-20	
ISC Vol. 444	Gotcha!	1985	Bill Conti	Limited Ed.	2020-03-09	
ISC Vol. 445	Morituri	1965	Jerry Goldsmith	Limited Ed.	2020-03-23	
ISC Vol. 446	Legal Eagles	1986	Elmer Bernstein	Limited Ed.	2020-03-08	
ISC Vol. 447	Take Her, She's Mine	1963	Jerry Goldsmith	Limited Ed.	2020-04-20	
ISC Vol. 448	Ulzana's Raid	1972	Frank De Vol	Limited Ed.	2020-05-18	
ISC Vol. 449	The Land Before Time	1988	James Horner	Limited Ed.	2020-10-26	
ISC Vol. 450	The Flight of the Phoenix (2CD)	1965	Frank DeVol	Limited Ed.	2021-02-22	
ISC Vol. 451	The Last Castle (2CD)	2001	Jerry Goldsmith	Limited Ed.	2020-10-26	
ISC Vol. 452	Inchon (3CD)	1982	Jerry Goldsmith	Limited Ed.	2020-12-14	
ISC Vol. 453	Psycho III (2CD)	1986	Carter Burwell	Limited Ed.	2021-01-11	
ISC Vol. 454	The Don Is Dead	1973	Jerry Goldsmith	Limited Ed.	2020-08-24	
ISC Vol. 455	The Rocketeer (2CD)	1991	James Horner	Limited Ed.	2020-01-23	Remastered re-issue of ISC Vol. 357
ISC Vol. 456	Bill & Ted's Excellent Adventure	1989	David Newman	Limited Ed.	2020-07-28	Re-release of ISC Vol. 269
ISC Vol. 457	Mussolini: The Untold Story (2CD)	1985	Laurence Rosenthal	Limited Ed.	2020-09-07	Re-release of ISC Vol. 007
ISC Vol. 458	Robin Hood: Prince of Thieves (4CD)	1991	Michael Kamen	Limited Ed.	2020-09-21	Expanded re-release of ISC Vol. 395
ISC Vol. 459	War of the Worlds (2CD)	2005	John Williams	Limited Ed.	2020-10-05	
ISC Vol. 460	Species II	1998	Edward Shearmur	Limited Ed.	2020-11-16	
ISC Vol. 461	DeepStar Six	1989	Harry Manfredini	Limited Ed.	2020-05-17	Remastered re-release of MAF 7004D
ISC Vol. 462	Company Business (2CD)	1991	Michael Kamen	Limited Ed.	2020-04-05	Expanded re-release of MAF 7013D
ISC Vol. 463	The Public Eye	1992	Jerry Goldsmith	Limited Ed.	2021-06-14	
ISC Vol. 464	Sleepy Hollow (4CD)	1999	Danny Elfman	Limited Ed.	2021-07-26	
ISC Vol. 465	The Eiger Sanction (2CD)	1975	John Williams	Limited Ed.	2021-08-09	
ISC Vol. 466	Face of a Fugitive	1959	Jerry Goldsmith	Limited Ed.	2021-03-22	
ISC Vol. 467	Extreme Prejudice	1987	Jerry Goldsmith	Limited Ed.	2021-07-12	
ISC Vol. 468	Masada (4CD)	1981	Jerry Goldsmith/Morton Stevens	Limited Ed.	2021-12-06	Expanded re-issue
ISC Vol. 469	Shamus	1973	Jerry Goldsmith	Limited Ed.	2021-05-31	
ISC Vol. 470	Toy Soldiers	1991	Robert Folk	Limited Ed.	2021-12-06	
ISC Vol. 471	Another 48 Hrs.	1990	James Horner	Limited Ed.	2022-01-10	
ISC Vol. 472	48 Hrs.	1982	James Horner	Limited Ed.	2022-01-10	
ISC Vol. 473	Jumanji	1995	James Horner	Limited Ed.	2022-05-02	
ISC Vol. 474	SpaceCamp	1986	John Williams	Limited Ed.	2022-05-13	
ISC Vol. 475	Dead Men Don't Wear Plaid	1982	Miklos Rozsa	Limited Ed.	2022-04-18	
ISC Vol. 476	Willow (2CD)	1988	James Horner	Limited Ed.	2022-06-27	
ISC Vol. 477	Conan the Destroyer (2CD)	1984	Basil Poledouris	Limited Ed.	2022-22-05	
ISC Vol. 478	Becket	1964	Laurence Rosenthal	Limited Ed.	2022-04-18	
ISC Vol. 479	Matinee	1993	Jerry Goldsmith	Limited Ed.	2022-05-30	
ISC Vol. 480	Lifeforce	1985	Michael Kamen	Limited Ed.	2022-08-15	
ISC Vol. 481	Lifeforce (2CD)	1985	Henry Mancini	Limited Ed.	2022-08-15	
ISC Vol. 482	Shattered	1991	Alan Silvestri	Limited Ed.	2023-02-07	
ISC Vol. 483	Hollow Man (2CD)	2000	Jerry Goldsmith	Limited Ed.	2022-10-24	
ISC Vol. 484	The Funhouse	1981	John Beal	Limited Ed.	2023-01-23	
ISC Vol. 485	The Faculty (2CD)	1998	Marco Beltrami	Limited Ed.	2023-02-27	
ISC Vol. 486	Silver Bullet (2CD)	1985	Jay Chattaway	Limited Ed.	2023-01-09	
ISC Vol. 487	Peter Pan (2CD)	2003	James Newton Howard	Limited Ed.	2023-03-20	
ISC Vol. 488	Invasion of the Body Snatchers (2CD)	1978	Denny Zeitlin	Limited Ed.	2023-07-17	
ISC Vol. 489	Nightbreed (2CD)	1990	Danny Elfman	Limited Ed.	2024-04-02	
ISC Vol. 490	Deadly Blessing	1981	James Horner	Limited Ed.	2023-06-27	
ISC Vol. 491	The Rock (2CD)	1996	Hans Zimmer / Nick Glennie-Smith	Limited Ed.	2023-10-03	
ISC Vol. 492	Honey, I Shrunk the Kids	1989	James Horner	Limited Ed.	2024-04-30	
ISC Vol. 493	Windtalkers (3CD)	2002	James Horner	Limited Ed.	2023-08-08	
ISC Vol. 494	Something Wicked This Way Comes (3CD)	1983	James Horner	Limited Ed.	2024-01-16	
ISC Vol. 495	Humanoids from the Deep	1980	James Horner	Limited Ed.	2023-09-19	
ISC Vol. 496	Battle Beyond the Stars (2CD)	2002	James Horner	Limited Ed.	2023-11-14	
ISC Vol. 497	Puppet Master: Axis of Evil Trilogy (3CD)	2010 / 2012 / 2017	Richard Band	Limited Ed.	2023-08-21	
ISC Vol. 498	Fear Street Trilogy (5CD)	2021	Marco Beltrami and others	Limited Ed.	2023-08-06	
ISC Vol. 499	MacArthur (2CD)	1977	Jerry Goldsmith	Limited Ed.	2023-12-12	
ISC Vol. 500	Out of Africa (2CD)	1985	John Barry	Limited Ed.	2024-12-02	
ISC Vol. 501	Inchon (3CD)	1982	Jerry Goldsmith	Limited Ed.	2024-02-13	re-release
ISC Vol. 502	The Nightcomers (2CD)	1971	Jerry Fielding	Limited Ed.	2024-01-30	remastered re-issue of ISC Vol. 063
ISC Vol. 503	The Lady in Red	1979	James Horner	Limited Ed.	2024-03-19	
ISC Vol. 505	Foul Play (2CD)	1978	Charles Fox	Limited Ed.	2024-08-20	
ISC Vol. 506	Species (2CD)	1995	Christopher Young	Limited Ed.	2024-04-16	expanded re-issue
ISC Vol. 507	Night Passage	1957	Dimitri Tiomkin	Limited Ed.	2024-05-14	
ISC Vol. 508	Dinosaur (2CD)	2000	James Newton Howard	Limited Ed.	2024-09-24	
ISC Vol. 509	The Straight Story	1999	Angelo Badalamenti	Limited Ed.	2024-05-28	
ISC Vol. 511	Backdraft (2CD)	1991	Hans Zimmer	Limited Ed.	2024-06-25	
ISC Vol. 512	A Raisin in the Sun / Requiem for a Heavyweight	1961 / 1962	Laurence Rosenthal	Limited Ed.	2024-10-07	expanded re-issue
ISC Vol. 513	Edge of Sanity	1989	Frédéric Talgorn	Limited Ed.	2024-09-17	
ISC Vol. 514	Fear	1996	Carter Burwell	Limited Ed.	2024-10-15	
ISC Vol. 515	Resurrection	1980	Maurice Jarre	Limited Ed.	2024-11-11	
ISC Vol. 516	Islands in the Stream	1977	Jerry Goldsmith	Limited Ed.	2024-11-19	

Intrada MAF/INT (Mary Ann Fake)

Catalog #	Title	Year	Composer	Released	OOP	Additional notes
MAF 7001D	Extreme Prejudice	1987	Jerry Goldsmith	1987-06-01	OOP	
MAF 7002D	Rent-a-cop	1987	Jerry Goldsmith	1988	OOP	
MAF 7003D	Warlock	1989	Jerry Goldsmith	1989	OOP	
MAF 7004D	DeepStar Six	1989	Harry Manfredini	1989	OOP	
MAF 7005D	The Wind And The Lion	1975	Jerry Goldsmith	1992-09	OOP	
MAF 7006D	Quigley Down Under	1990	Basil Poledouris	1990	OOP	
MAF 7007D	Hider In The House	1989	Christopher Young	1990	OOP	
MAF 7008D	The Barbarians	1987	Pino Donaggio	1990	OOP	
MAF 7009D	Flowers In The Attic	1987	Christopher Young	1990	OOP	
MAF 7010D	Def-Con 4 Avenging Angel; Torment; The Telephone	1985	Christopher Young	1990	OOP	
MAF 7011D	Lionheart	1990	John Scott	1990	OOP	
MAF 7012D	Not Without My Daughter	1991	Jerry Goldsmith	1991	OOP	
MAF 7013D	Company Business	1991	Michael Kamen	1991	OOP	
MAF 7014D	Bright Angel	1991	Christopher Young	1991	OOP	
MAF 7015D	Toy Soldiers	1991	Robert Folk	1991	OOP	
MAF 7016D	Red King, White Knight	1991	John Scott	1991	OOP	
MAF 7017D	Kabuto	1992	John Scott	1991	OOP	
MAF 7018D	The Astronomers	1990	J.A.C. Redford	1991	OOP	
MAF 7019D	Beastmaster 2: Through The Portal Of Time	1991	Robert Folk	1991	OOP	
MAF 7020D	Hour Of The Gun	1967	Jerry Goldsmith	1991	OOP	
MAF 7021D	CrissCross	1992	Trevor Jones	1992	OOP	
MAF 7022D	Aces: Iron Eagle III	1992	Harry Manfredini	1992	OOP	
MAF 7023D	O Pioneers!	1991	Bruce Broughton	1991	OOP	
MAF 7024D	Keeper Of The City	1991	Leonard Rosenman	1991	OOP	
MAF 7025D	The Great Escape	1963	Elmer Bernstein	1992	OOP	
MAF 7026D	Ruby	1992	John Scott	1992	OOP	
MAF 7027D	Thunderheart	1992	James Horner	1992	OOP	
MAF 7028D	The Vagrant	1992	Christopher Young	1992	OOP	
MAF 7029D	Magdalene	1989	Cliff Eidelman	1992-06-01	OOP	
MAF 7030D	Honey, I Blew Up The Kid	1992	Bruce Broughton	1992	OOP	
MAF 7031D	Unlawful Entry	1992	James Horner	1992	OOP	
MAF 7032D	The Arrival	1990	Richard Band	1992	OOP	
MAF 7033D	Crash And Burn	1990	Richard Band	1992	OOP	
MAF 7034D	In The Line Of Duty: A Cop For The Killing	1990	Mark Snow	1992	OOP	
MAF 7035D	Silverado	1985	Bruce Broughton	1992	OOP	
MAF 7036D	The Resurrected	1992	Richard Band	1991	OOP	
MAF 7037D	Son Of The Morning Star	1991	Craig Safan	1992	OOP	
MAF 7038D	Tombstone	1993	Bruce Broughton	1993	OOP	
MAF 7039D	One Against The Wind	1991	Lee Holdridge	1993-07-27	OOP	
MAF 7040D	Samantha	1992	Joel McNeely	1992	OOP	
MAF 7041D	Homeward Bound: The Incredible Journey	1993	Bruce Broughton	1993	OOP	
MAF 7042D	A Far Off Place	1993	James Horner	1993	OOP	
MAF 7043D	Dr. Giggles	1992	Brian May	1992	OOP	
MAF 7044D	Critters	1986	David Newman	1993-07-27	OOP	
MAF 7045D	Critters 2: The Main Course	1988	Nicholas Pike	1993-08-10	OOP	
MAF 7046D	The House On Sorority Row	1983	Richard Band	1993-11-02	OOP	
MAF 7047D	Sahara	1983	Ennio Morricone	1992	OOP	
MAF 7048D	Cold Heaven	1991	Stanley Myers	1993	OOP	
MAF 7049D	Warlock: The Armageddon	1993	Mark McKenzie	1993	OOP	
MAF 7050D	Leprechaun	1993	Kevin Kiner	1993-03-09	OOP	
MAF 7051D	Angel	1984	Craig Safan	1993	OOP	
MAF 7053D	The Ballad Of Little Jo	1993	David Mansfield	1993	OOP	
MAF 7054D	Creature From The Black Lagoon	1954	Hans J. Salter	1994	OOP	
MAF 7055D	Ivanhoe	1952	Miklós Rózsa	1994		Excalibur Collection #3
MAF 7056D	Julius Caesar	1953	Miklós Rózsa	1995		Excalibur Collection #4
MAF 7057D	Miklós Rózsa: Film Music For Piano	n/A	Miklós Rózsa	1994	OOP	
MAF 7058D	In The Army Now	1994	Robert Folk	1994	OOP	
MAF 7059D	Frank And Jesse	1994	Mark McKenzie	1994-11-23	OOP	
MAF 7060D	The Blood Of Heroes	1988	Todd Boekelheide	1995	OOP	
MAF 7061D	QB VII	1974	Jerry Goldsmith	1995	OOP	
MAF 7062D	Judicial Consent	1994	Christopher Young	1995	OOP	
MAF 7063D	Dr. Jekyll And Ms. Hyde	1995	Mark McKenzie	1995-10-12	OOP	
MAF 7064D	Miklós Rózsa: Film Music For Piano Vol. 2	1995	Miklós Rózsa	1995	OOP	
MAF 7065D	Castle Freak	1995	Richard Band	1995	OOP	
MAF 7066D	The Last Starfighter	1984	Craig Safan	1995	OOP	
MAF 7067D	The Utilizer	1996	Dennis McCarthy	1995-10-21	OOP	
MAF 7068D	Carried Away	1996	Bruce Broughton	1996-04-23	OOP	
MAF 7069D	Ticks; The First Of The North Star	1993	Christopher L. Stone	1996-06-18	OOP	
MAF 7070D	Norma Jean & Marilyn	1996	Christopher Young	1996	OOP	
MAF 7071D	The Stupids	1996	Christopher L. Stone	1996-08-15	OOP	
MAF 7072D	Infinity	1996	Bruce Broughton	1996	OOP	
MAF 7073D	Shadow Conspiracy	1997	Bruce Broughton	1996	OOP	
MAF 7074D	Islands In The Stream	1977	Jerry Goldsmith	1996	OOP	Excalibur collection #2
MAF 7075D	King Solomon's Mines	1985	Jerry Goldsmith	1997	OOP	reissue of FMT 8005D
MAF 7076D	A Patch Of Blue	1965	Jerry Goldsmith	1997	OOP	
MAF 7077D	True Women	1997	Bruce Broughton	1997	OOP	
MAF 7078D	Last Stand At Saber River	1997	David Shire	1997	OOP	
MAF 7079D	Rough Riders	1997	Peter Bernstein	1997-11-18	OOP	
MAF 7080D	The Disappearance Of Garcia Loca	1997	Mark McKenzie	1997-11-18	OOP	
MAF 7081D	Peter Benchley's Creature	1998	John van Tongeren	1998	OOP	
MAF 7082D	Holly vs. Hollywood	1998	Douglass Fake	1998		
MAF 7083	Jason And The Argonauts	1963	Bernard Herrmann	1999		Excalibur Collection #5
MAF 7084	One Tough Cop	1998	Bruce Broughton	1998	OOP	
MAF 7085	Heart Of Darkness	1999	Bruce Broughton	1999-06-29	OOP	
MAF 7086	Lost In Space	1998	Bruce Broughton	1998	OOP	
MAF 7087	Durango	1999	Mark McKenzie	1999-04-20	OOP	
MAF 7088	The Ballad Of Lucy Whipple	2001	Bruce Broughton	2001-02-06	OOP	
MAF 7089	The Last Express	1997	Elia Cmiral	2000-06-06	OOP	
MAF 7090	Beat	2000	Ernest Troost	2000	OOP	
MAF 7091	The Lost Child	2000	Mark McKenzie	2000	OOP	
MAF 7092	Love And Treason	2001	Basil Poledouris	2001	OOP	
MAF 7093	Bones	2001	Elia Cmiral	2003-05	OOP	
MAF 7094	Rambo III	1988	Jerry Goldsmith	2005		reissue of RVF 6006D
MAF 7095	Islands In The Stream	1977	Jerry Goldsmith	2005-10-25		reissue of MAF 7074D
MAF 7096	Silverado (2-CD-Set)	1985	Bruce Broughton	2005-12-13		
MAF 7097	Ballets Russes	2005	Todd Boekelheide & David Conte	2005-12-06		
MAF 7098	Tombstone (2-CD-Set)	1993	Bruce Broughton	2006-03-17		
MAF 7099	Red Dawn	1984	Basil Poledouris	2007-04-17		
MAF 7100	Spellbound	1945	Miklós Rózsa	2007-04		Excalibur collection #6
MAF 7101	The Wind And The Lion (2-CD-Set)	1975	Jerry Goldsmith	2007-08-07		
MAF 7102	Alien (2-CD-Set)	1979	Jerry Goldsmith	2007-11-19		
MAF 7103	Bone Dry	2007	Scott Glasgow	2008-03	OOP	
MAF 7104	Death Race	2008	Paul Haslinger	2008-08-19	OOP	
MAF 7105	The Tale Of Despereaux	2008	William Ross	2008-12		
MAF 7106	Role Models	2008	Craig Wedren	2009-03	OOP	
MAF 7107	JAG	1995	Bruce Broughton & Steve Bramson	2010-04-26		
MAF 7108	Manhunter	1986	The Reds & Michel Rubini	2010-03-01	OOP	
MAF 7109	Rocky IV	1985	Vince DiCola	2010-05-10		
MAF 7110	Patton (2-CD-Set)	1970	Jerry Goldsmith	2010-11-08		
MAF 7111	First Blood (2-CD-Set)	1982	Jerry Goldsmith	2010-11-22		
MAF 7112	The Great Escape (3-CD-Set)	1963	Elmer Bernstein	2011-01-10		
MAF 7113	Observations	2009	Arthur B. Rubinstein	2011-05-17		
MAF 7114	Star Trek IV: The Voyage Home	1986	Leonard Rosenman	2011-12-12		
MAF 7115	The First Great Train Robbery (2-CD-Set)	1979	Jerry Goldsmith	2011-11-28		
MAF 7116	The Sand Pebbles (2-CD-Set)	1966	Jerry Goldsmith	2011-12-12		
MAF 7117	Star Trek VI: The Undiscovered Country (2-CD-Set)	1991	Cliff Eidelman	2012-02-26		
MAF 7118	Predator	1987	Alan Silvestri	2012-03-06		
MAF 7119	Star Trek V: The Final Frontier (2-CD-Set)	1989	Jerry Goldsmith	2012-05-14		
MAF 7120	Once Upon A Time	2011	Mark Isham	2012-05-01		
MAF 7121	Charade	1963	Henry Mancini	2012-05-28		
MAF 7122	The Red House	1947	Miklós Rózsa	2012-10-29		Excalibur Collection #7
MAF 7123	Conan the Barbarian (3-CD-Set)	1982	Basil Poledouris	2012-11-26		
MAF 7124	Yellow Rock	2011	Randy Miller	2013-06-		
MAF 7125	Inchon (2-CD-Set)	1981	Jerry Goldsmith	2013-06-24		reissue of ISC Vol. 35
MAF 7126	Rio Conchos	1964	Jerry Goldsmith	2013-07-08		reissue of RVF 6007D (remastered and expanded)
MAF 7127	Once Upon A Time - Season 2	2012	Mark Isham	2013-09-02		
MAF 7128	Revenge	2011	iZIER	2013-09-02		
MAF 7129	Breakfast At Tiffany's	1961	Henry Mancini	2013-11-25		
MAF 7130	Re-Animator	1985	Richard Band	2014-01-21		reissue of ISE1030
MAF 7131	Young Sherlock Holmes (2-CD-Set)	1985	Bruce Broughton	2014-04-01		
MAF 7132	The Man in Half Moon Street	1945	Miklós Rózsa	2014-04-01		Excalibur Collection #8
MAF 7133	Shiver	2012	Richard Band	2014-05-26		
MAF 7134	Ben Hur / King of Kings: The Twelve Choruses	1959 / 1961	Miklos Rozsa	2014-06-10		Excalibur collection #9
MAF 7135	Master of the World / Goliath and the Barbarians	1961 / 1959	Les Baxter	2014-06-24		Reissue of ISE1029
MAF 7136	House Of Usher	1959	Les Baxter	2014-07-08		reissue of ISC Vol.159
MAF 7137	The Baytown Outlaws	2012	Christopher Young & Kostas Christides	2014-08-19		
MAF 7138	Switchback	1997	Basil Poledouris	2014-09-16		reissue of ISC Vol.1
MAF 7139	The Last Starfighter	1985	Craig Safan	2015-01-05		reissue of MAF 7066D (remastered and expanded)
MAF 7140	Spacecamp	1986	John Williams	2014-12-02		reissue of ISC Vol.140
INT 7141	On the Waterfront	1954	Leonard Bernstein	2014-12-02		World Premiere
INT 7142	Capricorn One	1978	Jerry Goldsmith	2015-07-20		reissue of ISC Vol. 021
INT 7143	In Harm's Way	1965	Jerry Goldsmith	2015-10-12		reissue of ISC Vol. 100 (expanded)
INT 7144	Back to the Future	1985	Alan Silvestri	2015-10-12		reissue of CD1 from ISC Vol.116
INT 7145	Jaws (2-CD-Set)	1975	John Williams	2015-11-16		
INT 7146	Edward Scissorhands	1990	Danny Elfman	2015-12-07		
INT 7147	The Ten Commandments (6-CD-Set)	1956	Elmer Bernstein	2016-09-19		
INT 7148	Silver Streak	1990	Henry Mancini	2016-06-13		Stereo reissue of ISC Vol. 005
INT 7149	Rambo: First Blood Part II (2-CD-Set)	1985	Jerry Goldsmith	2016-03-05		
INT 7150	Rambo III	1988	Jerry Goldsmith	2018-08-08		reissue of MAF 7094 (remastered)
INT 7151	Welcome to Marwen	2018	Alan Silvestri	2018-12-14		
INT 7152	Backdraft II	2019	Randy Edelman	2019-05-06		
INT 7153	Happy Death Day 2U	2019	Bear McCreary	2019-06-17		
INT 7154	MA	2019	Gregory Tripi	2019-05-31		
INT 7155	CRAWL	2019	Max Aruj / Steffen Thum	2019-10-21		
INT 7156	Dora and the Lost City of Gold	2019	John Debney / Germaine Franco	2019-12-02		
INT 7157	Dial M For Murder	1954	Dimitri Tiomkin	2019-12-12		Excalibur Collection #10
INT 7158	Paris Under the Stars	1927/32	Dimitri Tiomkin	2019-12-12		
INT 7159	Dragonheart: Vengeance	2020	Mark McKenzie	2019-02-03		
INT 7160	Ivanhoe (Re-recording)	1952	Miklos Rozsa	2020-02-03		re-issue of MAF 7055D (remastered)
INT 7161	The Haunting of Bly Manor	2020	The Newton Brothers	2020-10-19		
INT 7162	The Croods: A New Age	2020	Mark Mothersbaugh	2020-12-14		
INT 7163	Rio Conchos	1964	Jerry Goldsmith	2021-05-03		re-issue of MAF 7126 (remastered)
INT 7164	Call of the Wild	2020	John Powell	2021-06-28		
INT 7165	Julius Caesar	1953	Miklos Rozsa	2021-08-23		re-issue of MAF 7056D (remastered and expanded)
INT 7166	To Kill a Mockingbird/Walk on the Wild Side	1962	Elmer Bernstein	2021-10-04		
INT 7167	Clifford the Big Red Dog	2021	John Debney	2021-12-06		
INT 7168	Black Patch/The Man	1957/1972	Jerry Goldsmith	2022-03-07		Excalibur Collection #11
INT 7169	The Phantom of the Opera	1925	Craig Safan	2022-03-21		
INT 7170	The Sand Pebbles	1966	Jerry Goldsmith	2022-04-12		
MAF 7171	The Last Starfighter	1985	Craig Safan	2022-05-09		
MAF 7172	Star Trek III: The Search for Spock	1984	James Horner	2022-06-13		
MAF 7173	Prancer: A Christmas Tale	2022	Mark McKenzie	2022-11-21		
MAF 7174	Albertina Rasch & The Great American Ballet	2022	Dimitri Tiomkin	2022-12-05		
INT 7175	80 for Brady	2023	John Debney	2023-03-20		
INT 7176	The Man Who Knew Too Much / On Dangerous Ground	1956/51	Bernard Herrmann	2023-04-17		Excalibur Collection #12
INT 7177	Solo: A Star Wars Story (2CD)	2018	John Powell	2023-10-31		
INT 7178	The Piper	2024	Christopher Young	2024-04-16		
INT 7179	Jerry Goldsmith at The General Electric Theater	2024	Jerry Goldsmith	2024-07-24		Excalibur Collection #13
INT 7180	Killing Me Softly With His Song	1958	Charles Fox	2024-12-02		
INT 7181	Supercell	2023	Corey Wallace	Limited Ed.	2024-12-02	
INT 7182	The Old Man and the Sea (2CD)	1958	Dimitri Tiomkin	2024-12-02		Excalibur Collection
INT-D 9001	Heavenquest: A Pilgrim's Progress	2020	Jonathan Beard	2019-11-30		digital download
INT-D 9002	Sometimes I Think About Dying	2020	Dabney Morris	2024-01-27		digital download
INT-D 9003	A Mistake	2024	Frank Ilfman	2024-12-02		digital download

Intrada Signature Editions

Catalog #	Title	Year	Composer	Limited?	Released	OOP / SOLD OUT
ISE1001	The Tower	2002	Christopher Young	1000	2004-03-30	SO
ISE1002	Shade	2004	Christopher Young	1000	2004-10-24	SO
ISE1003	The Prodigal	1983	Bruce Broughton	1000	2005-03	SO
ISE1004	Spartacus	2004	Randy Miller	1000	2005-05-17	SO
ISE1005	Last Flight Out	2004	Bruce Broughton	1000	2005-07	SO
ISE1006	The Echo Of Thunder	1998	Laurence Rosenthal	1000	2005-12-20	SO
ISE1007	Major Dundee – The Extended Version	1965; 2005	Christopher Caliendo	1000	2006-02-23	SO
ISE1008	In From The Night / Silver Bells	2006 / 2000	Mark McKenzie	1000	2006-06-08	SO
ISE1009	Eloise At The Plaza / Eloise At Christmastime (2-CD-Set)	2003 / 2003	Bruce Broughton	1200	2006-11-01	SO
ISE1010	Troll	1986	Richard Band	1200	2006-12-01	SO
ISE1011	Blizzard	2003	Mark McKenzie	1000	2006-12-12	SO
ISE1012	East Of Eden	1981	Lee Holdridge	1000	2007-02-27	SO
ISE1013	Hercules	1983	Pino Donaggio	1000	2007-07-19	SO
ISE1014	Zone Troopers / The Alchimist	1985 / 1985	Richard Band	1000	2007-08-21	SO
ISE1015	One Night With The King	2006	J.A.C. Redford	1000	2007-12-11	SO
ISE1016	Broken Trail	2006	David Mansfield & Van Dyke Parks	1000	2008-01-28	SO
ISE1017	Invasion U.S.A.	2006	Jay Chattaway	1000	2008-02-12	SO
ISE1018	Proud Men / To Heal A Nation	1987 / 1988	Laurence Rosenthal	1000	2008-05-19	SO
ISE1019	The Explorers: A Century Of Discovery	1988	Lee Holdridge	1000	2008-04-21	SO
ISE1020	This Girl For Hire	1983	Bruce Broughton	1000	2008-03-24	SO
ISE1021	The Day Time Ended / The Dungeonmaster	1980 / 1985	Richard Band	1000	2008-05-19	SO
ISE1022	The Delta Force	1986	Alan Silvestri	1000	2008-07-28	SO
ISE1023	I have Never Forgotten You: The Life & Legacy Of Simon Wiesenthal	2007	Lee Holdridge	1000	2008-07-14	SO
ISE1024	Invaders From Mars	1986	Christopher Young / David Storrs	1200	2008-07-28	SO
ISE1025	Ghost Warrior	1986	Richard Band	1000	2008-09-22	SO
ISE1026	Fires Within	1991	Maurice Jarre	1000	2008-12-15	SO
ISE1027	Parasite	1982	Richard Band	1000	2008-12-15	SO
ISE1028	George Washington II: The Forging Of A Nation	1986	Bruce Broughton	1000	2009-03-30	SO
ISE1029	Master Of The World / Goliath And The Barbarians (2-CD-Set)	1961 / 1959	Les Baxter	1000	2009-04-14	SO
ISE1030	Re-Animator / Ghoulies	1985 / 1983	Richard Band	1000	2009-05-11	SO
ISE1031	10 To Midnight	1983	Robert O. Ragland	1000	2009-09-28	SO
ISE1032	Scarecrows	1988	Terry Plumeri	1000	2009-09-28	SO
ISE1033	The Seven Magnificent Gladiators	1983	Dov Seltzer	1000	2009-10-12	SO
ISE1034	Extreme Close-Up	1990	James Horner	1500	2009-10-26	SO
ISE1035	In Search Of Peace	2001	Lee Holdridge	1000	2009-11-23	SO
ISE1036	The Caller	1987	Richard Band	1000	2009-12-27	SO
ISE1037	Last Rites	1988	Bruce Broughton	1000	2009-12-14	SO
ISE1038	Supernova (2-CD-Set)	2000	David Williams / Burkhard Dallwitz	1000	2010-01-06	SO
ISE1039	Cervantes	1967	Les Baxter	1200	2010-03-15	SO
ISE1040	Mr. Atlas	1997	Terry Plumeri	1000	2010-06-09	SO
ISE1041	George Washington (2-CD-Set)	1984	Laurence Rosenthal	1000	2010-07-05	SO
ISE1042	Glory & Honor	1998	Bruce Broughton	1200	2010-10-25	SO
ISE1043	Black Sea Raid	1997	Terry Plumeri	1000	2010-11-22	SO
ISE1044	Kidco	1984	Michael Small	1000	2011-04-05	SO
ISE1045	Prison	1988	Richard Band & Christopher L. Stone	1000	2011-06-13	SO
ISE1046	21 Hours At Munich	1976	Laurence Rosenthal	Limited Edition	2011-11-14	SO
ISE1047	Winston Churchill: Walking With Destiny	2010	Lee Holdridge	Limited Edition	2012-01-23	SO
ISE1048	Dragonworld	1994	Richard Band	Limited Edition	2012-06-11	SO
ISE1049	The Forgotten	1983	Laurence Rosenthal	Limited Edition	2013-07-08	SO
ISE1050	Raging Angels	1995	Terry Plumeri	Limited Edition	2013-09-16	
ISE1051	Remo Williams (TV-pilot) / Mission Of The Shark: The Saga Of The U.S.S. Indianapolis	1988/1991	Craig Safan	Limited Edition	2013-11-25	

Disney/Intrada Series

Catalog #	Title	Year	Composer	Limited?	Released	OOP / SOLD OUT
Disney / Intrada D001372702	Up	2009	Michael Giacchino	10000	2011-06-28	
Disney / Intrada D001383402	The Black Hole	1979	John Barry		2011-08-23	
Disney / Intrada D001415702	20,000 Leagues Under The Sea	1954	Paul J. Smith		2011-09-07	
Disney / Intrada D001734402	Toy Story 3	2010	Randy Newman		2012-01-23	
Disney / Intrada D001744102	The Black Cauldron	1985	Elmer Bernstein		2012-04-02	
Hollywood / Intrada D001759402	The Avengers	2012	Alan Silvestri		2012-05-01	
Disney / Intrada D001809202	Oz the Great and Powerful	2013	Danny Elfman		2013-03-05	
Disney / Intrada D001809402	The Lone Ranger	2013	Hans Zimmer		2013-03-21	
Disney / Intrada D001892602	Tinker Bell	2008	Joel McNeely		2013-07-22	
Hollywood / Intrada D001911702	Thor: The Dark World	2013	Brian Tyler		2013-11-12	
Disney / Intrada D002018902	Muppets Most Wanted / The Muppets	2011/14	Christophe Beck		2014-04-28	
Hollywood / Intrada	Captain America: The Winter Soldier	2014	Henry Jackman		2014-04-15	
Disney / Intrada D002115502	Tinker Bell and the Lost Treasure	2009	Joel McNeely		2015-02-02	
Disney / Intrada D002136702	Tinker Bell and the Great Fairy Rescue	2010	Joel McNeely		2015-02-16	
Disney / Intrada	The Legacy Collection: Lady and the Tramp	2015	Oliver Wallace		2015-04-28	

=== Former categories ===
Intrada RVF (Regina Victoria Fake)

Catalog #	Title	Year	Composer	Limited?	Released	OOP / SOLD OUT
RVF 6001D	Red Dawn	1984	Basil Poledouris		1985	OOP
RVF 6002D	Poltergeist II: The Other Side	1986	Jerry Goldsmith		1986	OOP
RVF 6003D	Islands In The Stream	1977	Jerry Goldsmith		1986	OOP
RVF 6004D	Night Crossing	1981	Jerry Goldsmith		1987	OOP
RVF 6005D	The Bourne Identity	1988	Laurence Rosenthal		1988	OOP
RVF 6006D	Rambo III	1988	Jerry Goldsmith		1989	OOP
RVF 6007D	Rio Conchos; The Agony And The Ecstasy	1964	Jerry Goldsmith		1989	
RVF 6008D	The Old Man And The Sea	1990	Bruce Broughton		1990	OOP

Intrada FMT (Film Music Treasures)

Catalog #	Title	Year	Composer	Limited?	Released	OOP / SOLD OUT
FMT 8001D	First Blood	1982	Jerry Goldsmith		1988	OOP
FMT 8002D	Inchon	1981	Jerry Goldsmith		1988	OOP
FMT 8003D	The Lord Of The Rings	1978	Leonard Rosenman		1991	OOP
FMT 8004D	The Night Of The Generals	1966	Maurice Jarre		1990	OOP
FMT 8005D	King Solomon's Mines	1985	Jerry Goldsmith		1991	OOP
FMT 8006D	Planet Of The Apes	1968	Jerry Goldsmith		1992	OOP
FMT 8007D	Genocide	1981	Elmer Bernstein		1993	OOP

Intrada VJF (Veronica Jeanne Fake)

Catalog #	Title	Year	Composer	Limited?	Released	OOP / SOLD OUT
VJF 5001D	Cinema Septet(2-CD-Set): American Harvest; Sparkle Road; Last Flight Out; Minstrel's Song; Trick Or Treat; Vietnam War Story; Invaders From Mars	n/A	Christopher Young		1993	OOP
VJF 5002D	Poltergeist II: The Other Side	1986	Jerry Goldsmith		1993	OOP
VJF 5003D	Bandolero!	1968	Jerry Goldsmith		1993	OOP
VJF 5004D	Night Crossing	1981	Jerry Goldsmith		1994	OOP

== LP releases ==
Catalog #	Title	Year	Composer	Limited?	Released	Additional notes
INT 3001	Troll	1986	Richard Band	500 units	2015-09-28	180-gram vinyl
INT 3003	Warlock (2-LP set)	1989	Jerry Goldsmith	Limited Ed.	2016-02-01	180-gram vinyl
INT 3004	Rocky IV	1985	Vince DiCola	Limited Ed.	2016-02-23	180-gram vinyl
INT 3005	Clash of the Titans (2-LP set)	1981	Laurence Rosenthal	Limited Ed.	2016-02-23	180-gram vinyl
INT 3006	Transformers - The Movie (2-LP set)	1986	Vince DiCola	Limited Ed.	2016-03-28	180-gram vinyl
