= Gerald Wilson (writer) =

Canadian screenwriter

Gerald Wilson is a Canadian writer, best known for his screenplays. He had a notable collaborative relationship with Michael Winner. He wrote teleplays for Scandinavian television.

He was born in Pittsburgh and raised in Canada. He moved to England in 1955 and began writing for television.

According to one writer "the typically Wilsonian hero is an ageing professional with nothing more to learn about his craft" and "there is a strong political dimension in Wilson's work."

Though retired he still has a great affection for his life's work. He lives with his wife Rebecca outside Westport in the west of Ireland.

== Select credits ==
- No Hiding Place - Deadline for Dummy (1963)
- Crane (1964) (TV series)
- The Man in Room 17 (TV Series)
- Robbery (1967) - story only
- Vendetta - The Button Man (1967)
- Champion House - The Saddest Words (1967)
- Scream Free! (1969) (uncredited)
- Thirty-Minute Theatre (1969) (TV Series) - The Boat to Addis Ababa
- Lawman (1971)
- Chato's Land (1972)
- Scorpio (1973)
- The Stone Killer (1973)
- Death Wish (1974) (uncredited)
- Firepower (1979)
- Mister Corbett's Ghost (TV Movie)
- Under the Glacier (1989)
- The Diver (2000)
