= Robert Paynter =

English cinematographer (1928–2010)

- Born: Robert William Paynter; 12 March 1928; London, England
- Died: 20 October 2010 (aged 82); Isle of Wight, England
- Occupation: Cinematographer

Robert William Paynter, B.S.C. (12 March 1928 – 20 October 2010) was an English cinematographer.

After leaving the Mercers' School in the City of London at the age of 15, Paynter entered the film industry as a camera trainee with the Government Film Department.

He is known for his collaborations with John Landis and Michael Winner.

== Collaborations ==
=== John Landis ===
Paynter worked with director John Landis on five films: An American Werewolf in London, Trading Places, Thriller, Into the Night and Spies Like Us. Paynter helped to create a "pop" comic book-style for American Werewolf, Thriller and Into the Night. He also made a cameo in three Landis' productions: Into the Night (as Security Guard), Spies like Us (as Dr. Gill) and Burke and Hare.

=== Michael Winner ===
Winner collaborated on 10 films with Paynter (from 1969 to 1984), including: The Big Sleep (1978) and Scream for Help (1984).

== Filmography ==
=== Films ===
- Rock-a-Doodle (1992, live-action sequences)
- Strike It Rich (1990)
- When the Whales Came (1989)
- Little Shop of Horrors (1986)
- Spies Like Us (1985)
- Into the Night (1985)
- The Muppets Take Manhattan (1984)
- Scream for Help (1984)
- Trading Places (1983)
- Superman III (1983)
- An American Werewolf in London (1981)
- The Final Conflict (1981)
- Superman II (1980)
- The Big Sleep (1978)
- Firepower (1979)
- High Velocity (1976)
- Scorpio (1973)
- The Mechanic (1972)
- Chato's Land (1972)
- The Nightcomers (1971)
- Lawman (1971)
- The Games (1970)
- Hannibal Brooks (1969)

=== Television ===
- The Zoo Gang (1974)

=== Music videos ===
- Michael Jackson's Thriller (1983)
