= William C. Watson =

American actor

William Watson
- Born: William C. Watson; October 5, 1938; Chicago, Illinois, U.S.
- Died: November 5, 1997 (aged 59); Kauaʻi, Hawaii, U.S.
- Occupation: Actor
- Years active: 1965–1987

William C. Watson (October 5, 1938 – November 5, 1997) was an American actor.

== Career ==
Born in Chicago, Illinois, Watson appeared in many television series and films, In the Heat of the Night (1967), Lawman (1971), The Hunting Party (1971), Chato's Land (1972), Executive Action (1973) and Wholly Moses! (1980).

In the 1960s and 1970s, he guest-starred on several TV series such as The Rat Patrol, The High Chaparral, Bonanza, Gunsmoke, The Streets of San Francisco, Kojak, Cannon, Hawaii Five-0, The Rookies, Starsky and Hutch, The Rockford Files, M*A*S*H, The Dukes of Hazzard, Emergency!, CHiPs, Quinn Martin's Tales of the Unexpected, and many more. His last appearance was in the film It's Alive III: Island of the Alive (1987) with Michael Moriarty. Watson may be best remembered as the slave trader who captured young Kunta Kinte in the TV miniseries Roots.

== Filmography ==
- 1966: Girl on a Chain Gang - Sheriff Sonny Lew Wymer
- 1967: In the Heat of the Night - McNeil
- 1967: Gunsmoke "Saturday Night" - Carl Craddock
- 1971: Lawman - Choctaw Lee
- 1971: The Hunting Party - Jim Loring
- 1972: Chato's Land - Harvey Lansing
- 1972: Hawaii Five-0 - Good Night Baby Time to Die! - L.B.Barker
- 1973: The Marcus-Nelson Murders (TV Series) - Det. Matt Black
- 1973: The Mack - Jed
- 1973: Executive Action - Technician - (Leader of Team B)
- 1973: The Streets of San Francisco (TV Series ) - Inspector Milt Didini
- 1973: The Rookies (TV Series ) - Sgt. Dunson
- 1974: Chopper One (TV Series) (S1 E12 "Downtime") as Peter Link
- 1974: The Streets of San Francisco ( TV Series )- Inspector Milt Didini
- 1974: Hawaii Five-O - Right Grave, Wrong Body - Hobart
- 1974: M*A*S*H (S3 E12 A Full Rich Day) - Lt Smith
- 1974: Gunsmoke (S20E11&12) Island in the Desert - Gard Dixon
- 1975: Captain Dobey, You're Dead (TV Series) - Leo Moon
- 1975: The Rockford Files (S1 E23 The Four Pound Brick) - Ross
- 1976: Emergency! (S6 E10 Welcome to Santa Rosa County) - Tom
- 1976: The Passover Plot - Roman Captain
- 1977: Roots (TV Mini-Series) - Gardner
- 1977: Quinn Martin's Tales of the Unexpected (TV Series) - Teddy Jakes
- 1977: Heroes - Bartender (uncredited)
- 1978: Stingray - Lonigan
- 1979: CHiPs (TV Series) - Sgt. Chapman
- 1980: Dallas (TV Series) - Hutch McKinney
- 1980: Wholly Moses! - Bandit
- 1982: The Sword and the Sorcerer - Karak
- 1986: Magnum, P.I. (TV Series) - Donald Hayes
- 1987: It's Alive III: Island of the Alive - Cabot (final film role)
