= Chato's Land =

1972 film by Michael Winner

- Theatrical release poster
- Directed by: Michael Winner
- Screenplay by: Gerald Wilson
- Produced by: Michael Winner
- Starring: Charles Bronson; Jack Palance; Richard Basehart; James Whitmore; Simon Oakland
- Cinematography: Robert Paynter
- Edited by: Michael Winner
- Music by: Jerry Fielding
- Production company: Scimitar Films
- Distributed by: United Artists
- Release date: May 25, 1972 (United States)
- Running time: 100 minutes
- Country: United States
- Language: English

Chato's Land is a 1972 Western Technicolor film directed by Michael Winner, starring Charles Bronson and Jack Palance.

In Apache country, the half-native Chato shoots the local sheriff in self-defense, and finds himself hunted by a posse of ex-Confederates, who rape his wife and leave her hogtied in the open as a bait to trap him. After freeing her, Chato uses his superior fieldcraft skills to lure each of the posse to their deaths.

The film can be classified in the revisionist Western genre, which was at its height at the time, with a dramatizing of racism and oblique referencing of the Vietnam War. The original screenplay was written by Gerry Wilson.

== Plot ==
The half-Apache Chato is racially abused in a bar by the sheriff. He shoots the sheriff dead in self-defense and rides out of town on his Paso Fino. Former Confederate Captain Quincey Whitmore dons his uniform and gathers a posse of former Confederate soldiers and sympathizers. Chato, staying one step ahead, fires on the posse from a hilltop, drawing them into a difficult ascent while he descends the other side and scatters their horses. He kills a rattlesnake and wraps the rattle in the snake's skin. Tensions begin to create divisions within the posse. They come across a set of empty wickiups and gleefully burn them.

Chato greets his wife at their hogan and gives his son the rattlesnake toy he fashioned earlier. Chato resumes his life breaking horses during the day. The posse discovers his home, and Elias, Earl, Hall and Lansing brutally gang-rape Chato's wife, and then hogtie her naked outside the hogan as bait to lead Chato into a trap. Chato devises a plan with his full-Apache kinsman, who creates a diversion allowing Chato to rescue his wife. Chato's kinsman is wounded and the posse hang him upside down and burn him alive. Whitmore, disgusted, shoots the burning man in the head.

Chato abandons European dress and dons native moccasins and loin cloth. He lures the posse members into individual traps, starting with Earl Hooker, who is fixated on Chato's wife. Finding Earl's dead body staked out in the desert, the posse grows more fractious, and they begin to turn on one another. When two of the posse turn back, Elias kills one and chases the other, but both are killed by Chato. Jubal kills Whitmore when he objects, inciting the last two members of the posse, Malechie and Logan, to beat Jubal to death with rocks. The two ride home, but Chato kills Malechie and allows Logan to flee without supplies, alone and horseless, deeper into Apache territory as Chato watches impassively from his horse.

== Cast ==
- Charles Bronson as Pardon Chato
- Jack Palance as Captain Quincey Whitmore
- James Whitmore as Joshua Everette
- Simon Oakland as Jubal Hooker
- Richard Basehart as Nye Buell
- Ralph Waite as Elias Hooker
- Richard Jordan as Earl Hooker
- Victor French as Martin Hall
- Sonia Rangan as Chato's wife
- William Watson as Harvey Lansing
- Roddy McMillan as Gavin Malechie
- Paul Young as Brady Logan
- Lee Patterson as George Dunn
- Peter Dyneley as Ezra Meade
- Hugh McDermott as Bartender
- Raúl Castro as Mexican scout
- Verna Harvey as Shelby Hooker

== Production ==
The film marked the start of a long-running collaboration between director Michael Winner and Charles Bronson. Screenwriter Gerald Wilson came up with the idea for the film while writing Lawman. The script was designed as a reflection on the subjugation of minorities, with parallels to the condition of Black Americans and the Vietnam War. The British Film Institute says it is a British film, the American Film Institute says it is an American film.

=== Filming ===
The film was shot in Almería, Spain, in 1971. Bronson has just fifteen lines of dialogue, thirteen in Apache dialect, which he learned by practicing with tape recordings prepared with assistance from a Beverly Hills–based Indian florist. The production sparked controversy due to claims of animal mistreatment, after four horses obtained from a Spanish abattoir were slaughtered on set and filmed being torn apart by vultures placed on the carcasses.

== Music ==
=== Soundtrack ===
A CD of the film's soundtrack was released on January 15, 2008, by Intrada Records (Intrada Special Collection Vol. 58).

==== Track listing ====
- 1. Titles - 4:41
- 2. Peeping Tom in the Bushes - 0:44
- 3. Mind Your Ma; Whiskey and Hot Sun - 1:29
- 4. Coop Falls - 1:24
- 5. Pain in the Water Bags; Burning Rancheros - 1 & 2 4:47
- 6. Peeping Tom on the Ridge; First Stampede - 3:04
- 7. Indian Convention - 1:35
- 8. The Snake Bite - 1:21
- 9. Chato Comes Home - 1:52
- 10. Indian Rodeo; Chato Bags Horse - 2:21
- 11. Junior Blows the Whistle - 0:42

- 12. Fire and Stampede; Joan of Arc at Stake - 3:54
- 13. Mr. & Mrs. Chato Split; Massas in the Cold, Cold Ground - 1:26
- 14. Hot Pants - 2:46
- 15. Rainbow on the Range - 0:58
- 16. Ride Like Hell - 0:50
- 17. Big Stare Job; Here-There-Everywhere - 2:19
- 18. Attack in Gorge - 1:53
- 19. One Big Pain in the Neck - 2:35
- 20. Lansing Scalped - 1:46
- 21. Elias Gets the Snake; Malechie Gets Shot; Finis - 5:06

== Release ==
=== Home media ===
It was released on Region One DVD in 2001 and on Region Two in 2004.

== Reception ==
=== Critical response ===
When released, Vincent Canby panned the film, calling it a "...long, idiotic revenge Western...It was directed by Michael Winner in some lovely landscapes near Almeria, Spain. Just about everybody gets shot or knifed, and one man dies after Chato lassos him with a live rattlesnake."

TV Guide, echoing Canby, wrote, "A great cast is primarily wasted in this gory, below-average, and overlong film. The script could have been written for a silent film to fit with Bronson's traditional man-of-few-words image (in fact, more grunts and squint than words)...As usual, Bronson must rely upon the conviction that there are viewers who find silence eloquent."

A more recent Film4 review was more positive, observing that Chato's Land "...though no masterpiece, is an effective and frequently disturbing piece of filmmaking. A tough, cynical Western with well-paced direction and a fine performance from Charles Bronson and the cast of vagabonds out to get him. A quality film from Michael Winner."

In 2025, Mark Franklin wrote in Once Upon a Time in a Western: "Little is asked of Bronson in the starring role. He has very few lines, though he does look incredibly buff running around in little but a loincloth at age 51."

=== 1970s political overtones ===
Film critic Graeme Clark discussed a political theme of the film when it was released in the early 1970s, writing, "There are those who view this film as an allegory of the United States' presence in Vietnam, which was contemporary to this storyline, but perhaps that is giving the filmmakers too much credit. Granted, there is the theme of the white men intruding on a land where they are frequently under fire, and ending up humiliated as a result, but when this was made it was not entirely clear that America would be on the losing side as the conflict may have been winding down, but was by no means over."

Film4 is more assertive in their review, "The cruelty of the posse is well conveyed by an able (and supremely ugly) group of actors headed up by Jack Palance and Simon Oakland. Some of their acts, such as the brutal rape of Chato's wife and the burning of an Indian village, have an unpleasant edge which Winner does not shy away from. Parallels with the contemporary situation in Vietnam can't have been lost on the original audience.

== See also ==
- List of American films of 1972

== Bibliography ==
- Harding, Bill (1978). The Films of Michael Winner. F. Muller. ISBN 978-0-584-10449-3.
