= The Mechanic (1972 film) =

1972 American action thriller film by Michael Winner

- Theatrical release poster
- Directed by: Michael Winner
- Written by: Lewis John Carlino
- Produced by: Robert Chartoff; Irwin Winkler
- Starring: Charles Bronson; Jan-Michael Vincent
- Cinematography: Richard H. Kline; Robert Paynter
- Edited by: Freddie Wilson (sup.); Arnold Crust Jr.
- Music by: Jerry Fielding
- Production company: Chartoff-Winkler Productions
- Distributed by: United Artists
- Release date: November 17, 1972 (New York)
- Running time: 100 minutes
- Country: United States
- Language: English
- Budget: $3 million

The Mechanic is a 1972 American action thriller film directed by Michael Winner and written by Lewis John Carlino. It stars Charles Bronson, in his second collaboration with Winner, and Jan-Michael Vincent in the leading roles. The supporting cast features Keenan Wynn, Jill Ireland and Frank de Kova.

The story follows Arthur Bishop (Bronson), a top assassin who takes under his wing Steve McKenna (Vincent), the ruthless and ambitious son of Harry McKenna (Wynn), the former head of the secret organization for which Bishop works. It is noted for its opening, which features no dialogue for the first 16 minutes, as Bronson's character prepares to kill his current target. The title refers to a euphemism for hitmen.

Upon its release, the film received generally mixed reviews from critics, with praise for the action scenes, acting, and cinematography, but criticism towards Winner's direction and the storytelling. A remake of the same name was released in 2011 to similarly mixed reception.

== Plot ==
Arthur Bishop is an elite contract killer, known as a "mechanic", who specializes in making his assassinations appear to be accidents and natural causes. He works for a strict, secretive international criminal organization. While his occupation affords him a lavish lifestyle complemented by classical music, art, and fine wines, it also isolates him due to his inability to trust others or show weakness. He regularly pays a call girl to pretend to be his deeply enamored girlfriend and write love letters to him. The constant pressure of his role requires him to regularly take anti-depressants, until he is eventually hospitalized from stress.

When Bishop is assigned one of the organization's heads, "Big Harry" McKenna, he shoots at Big Harry while making him think that the shots are being fired by a hidden sniper. Harry, who Bishop knows has a weak heart, runs up a steep incline, which triggers a heart attack. Bishop then finishes Harry off by smothering him.

At Big Harry's funeral, Bishop talks with Harry's narcissistic and sociopathic son Steve. Steve is intrigued by Bishop and seeks to find out more about him. Bishop is also intrigued. He realizes that Steve has a personality suited for being a hit man, and plays along. Over the course of time, and after much pressing from Steve, Arthur finally discloses his profession. He offers to teach Steve everything he knows and make him an associate.

As part of his training, Bishop teaches Steve that every person has a weakness that can be exploited to make them easy to kill. However, Bishop failed to get his superiors' prior consent for the arrangement. Following a messy assassination conducted by Bishop and Steve, the organization warns Bishop that his irresponsible choice to involve Steve has been interpreted as selfish behavior.

The organization then gives Bishop an urgent mission, this time in Italy. Once again, Bishop involves Steve in the new plan, but just before they leave, Bishop finds a file among Steve's belongings containing information about Bishop, similar to the target files provided to Bishop. Nevertheless, Bishop allows Steve to accompany him to Italy.

In Italy, Bishop and Steve approach a boat where their intended victim is supposed to be, but it is a trap, and they are the real targets. Bishop and Steve are ambushed, but they manage to kill all their would-be assassins.

As they pack their luggage in their hotel room, Steve shares a celebratory bottle of wine with Bishop, having coated the latter's glass with brucine, a colorless and deadly alkaloid. As Bishop slowly dies, Steve, recalling Bishop's earlier comments about everyone having a weakness, remarks that Bishop's was his inability to be alone. Steve goes on to reveal that he was not acting on orders to kill Bishop. Rather, he says that he is an independent who will "Pick my own mark, hit when I want!"

Steve returns to Bishop's home to pick up the Ford Mustang he had left there. When he climbs into the car, ready to start it, he finds a note affixed to the rear-view mirror, which reads:

Steve, if you read this, it means I didn't make it back. It also means you've broken a filament controlling a 13-second delay trigger. End of game. Bang! You're dead.

As Steve frantically reaches for the door handle, the car explodes, killing him.

== Cast ==
- Charles Bronson as Arthur Bishop
- Jan-Michael Vincent as Steve McKenna
- Keenan Wynn as Harry McKenna
- Jill Ireland as The Girl
- Linda Ridgeway as Louise
- Frank de Kova as The Man
- Takayuki Kubota as Yamoto
- Patrick O'Moore as The Old Man
- Enzo Fiermonte as The Mark
- Celeste Yarnall as The Mark's Girl

== Production ==
=== Development ===
The film was based on an original story by Lewis John Carlino. He said he came up with the idea while researching his script for The Brotherhood (1968). Producer Ted Dubin, a New York entrepreneur, put up some development money so that Carlino could write it. Carlino called it "a sort of existential statement on the licence to kill and what is occurring in our society, how legalized murder is occurring through our institutions."

Carlino formed a partnership with Dubin and producer Martin Poll. In February 1969, Carlino announced he had written two films that would be made by Poll the following year: The Catalyst, about a wealthy man whose search for meaning leads him to start a revolution in Africa, and The Mechanic. He said The Mechanic was about "professionals who dispassionately murder people by contract" and was "a look at the nature of violence and counter-violence in our society." In April 1969, it was announced that Cliff Robertson would star with Dubin to produce alongside Poll for Universal.

Filming was delayed. Eventually the film was sold to Chartoff-Winkler who had a deal with United Artists. Carlino was paid $100,000 plus one-third of 50% of the profits.

Monte Hellman was scheduled to direct The Mechanic. He and Carlino worked on the script for several weeks before producers switched studios and hired Michael Winner to direct.

In Carlino's original script, the relationship between Arthur Bishop and Steve McKenna was explicitly romantic. Producers had difficulty securing financing and several actors, including George C. Scott, flatly refused to consider the script until the homosexuality was removed. Carlino described The Mechanic as "one of the great disappointments of my life," continuing:

"I wanted a commentary on the use of human relationships and sexual manipulation in the lives of two hired killers. It was supposed to be a chess game between the older assassin and his young apprentice. The younger man sees that he can use his sexuality to find the Achilles heel that he needs to win. There was a fascinating edge to it, though, because toward the end the younger man began to fall in love, and this fought with his desire to beat the master and take his place as number one ... The picture was supposed to be a real investigation into this situation, and it turned into a pseudo James Bond film."

At one point, Cliff Robertson and Jeff Bridges were considered for the lead roles.

In November 1971, it was announced Charles Bronson would star under the direction of Michael Winner for producers Robert Chartoff and Irwin Winkler. This would be Winner's first film produced in the United States. He had previously worked with Bronson on Chato's Land.

Bronson conditioned that the producers cast his wife Jill Ireland in a supporting role. Filming was to begin December 6, 1971. Richard Dreyfuss was originally cast as Steve, but was replaced in early December 1971, apparently due to Bronson's dislike of him.

=== Filming ===
Filming took place in Los Angeles and Campania, Italy. The Mechanic was the first film Bronson starred in that was principally shot in the United States since 1966's This Property Is Condemned.

The film's martial arts scenes were shot in one day at the dojo of Takayuki Kubota who also appears in the film. The shooting required 65 camera setups. The scenes were cut short in the final edit, because, according to associate producer Henry Gellis, their inclusion made the film seem like an installment in the James Bond series.

The opening assassination of the film featured the largest controlled explosion in Los Angeles to that date. The explosion required five tanks of butane fuel and nine pounds of black powder.

"It's pretty violent", said Vincent. "Bronson is totally nonverbal. So I can't say that much about him".

== Music ==
The score and source music by Jerry Fielding were recorded at CTS (Cine-Tele Sound) Studios in London, England, between August 7 and 11, 1972. The orchestrations were by Lennie Niehaus and Greg McRitchie. The recording engineer was Dick Lewzey.

The source music consists of pieces composed by Ludwig van Beethoven — String Quartet No. 6 and Grosse Fuge — as well as Eduardo di Capua's Neapolitan song "'O sole mio".

== Release ==
=== Theatrical ===
The film opened in New York City on November 17, 1972, before expanding to a wide release on November 22.

=== Home media ===
Screen Archives Entertainment has released The Mechanic for the first time on Blu-ray on June 10, 2014. A remastered Blu-Ray was released in 2020 by Scorpion Releasing.

== Reception ==
=== Critical response ===
The film received a mixed critical response.

Vincent Canby of The New York Times described The Mechanic as a "solemn, rather spurious action melodrama". Noting the "father son rivalry" between Arthur and Steve and picking up on the "latent homosexual bond" between the two, Canby concluded that the film was "non-stop, mostly irrelevant physical spectacle" and pondered what a different director might have done with the same material. A review in Variety called it an "action-drenched gangster yarn which has all the makings of a heavy b.o. grosser, but simultaneously is burdened with an overly-contrived plot development". Roger Ebert gave the film 2.5 stars out of 4 and praised Bronson's performance, noting that he appears to be truly listening to Vincent rather than simply waiting for him to stop for Bronson's next line. While finding the plot twists "neat", Ebert found that director Winner failed to squarely address the relationship between the leads in favor of too many boring action sequences. Gene Siskel of the Chicago Tribune gave the film only 1 star out of 4 and wrote, "The entirely unoriginal production moves at a numbing pace with Bronson mirroring the directorial lethargy with his silent, 'don't I have strong cheekbones' demeanor". Kevin Thomas of the Los Angeles Times praised the film as "A hard-edged, brutal yet absorbing contemporary gangster movie" with "top-notch" performances. Judith Crist dismissed the film as "a banal expedition into slaughter and sadism and stupid dialogue". Any hint of authenticity, she wrote, was obliterated by Winner's "bang-bang-bang approach". Gary Arnold of The Washington Post wrote, "It's a predictable, expendable piece of formula moviemaking, and the men responsible for it seem considerably more proficient at manufacturing thrills than generating and sustaining dramatic interest".

According to the American Film Institute, "some modern critics have pointed to The Mechanic as a turning point in Bronson's career, solidifying his position as a major star in the U.S. as well as abroad." Previously, Bronson was mainly a leading man in European films.

On the review aggregation website Rotten Tomatoes, The Mechanic has a 50% positive review score based on 12 reviews.

== Novelization ==
A novelization credited to screenwriter Lewis John Carlino was published by Signet Books to accompany the film's release.

== Remake series ==
On May 7, 2009, it was announced that director Simon West would be helming a remake. Jason Statham starred as Arthur Bishop, with Ben Foster as Steve McKenna. The remake opened in the United States on January 28, 2011, making $11,500,000 on its opening weekend.

A sequel, Mechanic: Resurrection, was released in August 2016.

== See also ==
- List of American films of 1972

== Notes ==
- La-La Land Records Album, LLLCD1191, released 2012.
