= Jerry Fielding =

American composer, arranger, and bandleader (1922–1980)

- Also known as: Gerald Feldman, credited as Jerry Feldman prior to June, 1947
- Born: Joshua Itzhak Feldman; June 17, 1922; Pittsburgh, Pennsylvania, U.S.
- Origin: Pittsburgh, Pennsylvania, U.S.
- Died: February 17, 1980 (aged 57) Toronto, Ontario, Canada
- Genres: Jazz; pop; big band; film score
- Occupations: Composer; conductor; bandleader; musical director

Jerry Fielding (born Joshua Itzhak Feldman; June 17, 1922 – February 17, 1980) was an American jazz musician, bandleader, arranger, and film composer. He was a three-time Oscar nominee for Best Original Score, and an Emmy Award winner.

He began his career as a popular arranger for radio orchestras, but was blacklisted in 1953, subsequently working in Las Vegas. In the following decade, he re-emerged as a composer of film and television scores, most notably Westerns, crime, and action films. He was best known for his collaborations with Sam Peckinpah, Clint Eastwood, and Michael Winner.

His notable film scores include The Wild Bunch (1969), Johnny Got His Gun (1971), Straw Dogs (also 1971), The Mechanic (1972), The Gambler (1974), The Bad News Bears (1976), The Outlaw Josey Wales (also 1976), Demon Seed (1977), and Escape from Alcatraz (1979). He was also noted for his work on the television series Star Trek and Kolchak: The Night Stalker.

== Early life and education ==
Fielding was born Joshua Itzhak Feldman in Pittsburgh, to Russian Jewish parents Hiram Harris Feldman and Esther Feldman. By 1930, "Joshua Itzhak" had been discarded once and for all, as evidenced by both the 1930 US Census and the recollections, published more than seven decades later, of fellow Pittsburgher Henry Mancini. During the ensuing decade, Jerry briefly experimented with the trombone, then took up the clarinet and joined the high school band, eventually earning a scholarship to the Carnegie Institute for Instrumentalists. After a short attendance, because of ill health he was bedridden for two years with an undiagnosed ailment. While housebound, Feldman listened to the radio, and became a fan of the big band sound and Bernard Herrmann's music for Orson Welles's radio dramas.

== Freelance arranger ==
Somewhat recuperated, Feldman worked at Pittsburgh's Stanley Theater (where his fellow players included Mancini, Erroll Garner and Billy May), learning composition and arranging there from the theater's pit orchestra conductor, Max Adkins (as did Mancini and another notable Pittsburgh native, Billy Strayhorn). In June 1941, shortly before his nineteenth birthday, Feldman left Pittsburgh to work for Alvino Rey's swing band. His contributions to the band's repertoire included an arrangement of "Three Blind Mice" and an original composition, "Picnic in Purgatory".

This job ended when most of the band was drafted. Too frail for service, Feldman became vocal arranger for Lucy Ann Polk's Town Criers and then joined Kay Kyser's band. He became their chief arranger in 1945. In addition, he arranged for the big bands of Mitchell Ayres, Claude Thornhill, Jimmie Lunceford, Tommy Dorsey, Charlie Barnet and Les Brown.

== Radio work: from Feldman to Fielding ==
Feldman arranged for the Kay Kyser's Kollege of Musical Knowledge radio program, and then became the band leader for several radio programs: The Jack Paar Program (1947–1949), The Hardy Family 1952–1953, as well as work on The Fitch Bandwagon, The Life of Riley, and the Sweeney and March Show.

In the spring of 1947, having suitably impressed prospective employer, radio emcee Jack Paar (and his production team), Feldman was compelled to change his name as a prerequisite to securing the position of providing live on-air music (records were still not allowed on the air in 1947). He chose the name Fielding, and he would recount this transformation with some bitterness almost 25 years later:

They told me I was not going on with any name as Jewish as Feldman. I don't think there's any lessening of prejudice today. There's just more politeness about where and when it happens now. I think it's going to be the downfall of Homo sapiens.

In 1948, Fielding replaced Billy May as musical director on Groucho Marx's radio program You Bet Your Life. In 1951, the famous comedian brought Fielding along for the same musical directing job when he moved "You Bet Your Life" to television, one of the first hit shows of the new medium, and a job Fielding would hold until 1953. In June 1952, drawing on the same musicians employed in his radio and television work, he formed the Jerry Fielding Orchestra for the purposes of performing and recording his music while the television season was in its annual summer hiatus.

Fielding later recalled the reasons for doing this: "So a couple of [professional jazz] guys formed little bands, not to go in buses on the road, but to record with, do a few weekends at the Palladium, just rehearse, and keep the thing going. We were doing it for each other, really. And the first records I made—that's what they were. Frank had put a band together for the Palladium: and I said: "If he can do it, I can do it." I had five radio shows at the time: so we put this bunch together, and we started to do some wild things. ... In that band were Conrad Gozzo, Sam Donahue, Shelly Manne, Johnny Williams, Buddy Collette, Red Callender—everybody. I knew what these guys could do, and I wrote to the absolute limit of their abilities, which no one else did. We did some spectacular performances. Albert Marks recorded us a couple of times, and those are the early Trend records which are such collector's items now. I think they were collector's items the day they went in the store; they never really sold well."

The group would be featured on Fielding's own short-lived but well-received all-music TV series, the JF TV Show, and by the following summer, had released its debut LP, Jerry Fielding and His Great New Orchestra (Trend, 1953).

== Blacklisted, but welcomed in Vegas ==
Though never a Communist, Fielding was called before the House Un-American Activities Committee in December 1953 during the anti-Communist hysteria, particularly in Congress, and the FBI, who were in the throes of punishing the many talented FDR supporters in entertainment who had helped to defeat isolationists before Pearl Harbor. This was done by smearing them with innuendo and charges of Communism. Fielding's sin appeared to be his Radio Union membership (which was obligatory for all nationally broadcast radio performers) which was in turn one of a dozen or more unions in the Hollywood Writers Mobilization which was founded in 1941 to promote show business efforts against Nazism and in support of the American war effort. However, Fielding later joked that all the committee really wanted was to get him to name Groucho Marx as a communist, which he refused to do. He also believed he was being singled out for his integrated bands, using African-American jazz performers in his radio and television music, which was carried live at the time. All integration and equal rights to black performers were deeply offensive to some HUAC members, and to FBI head, J. Edgar Hoover.

Fielding took the Fifth Amendment, refusing to divulge the names of any colleagues who might be suspected of "Communism", doing so knowing that pleading the Fifth would damage his thriving radio and television career, as it did. He was blacklisted by the national television and radio networks, who were being pressed by these same forces with a similar fate if they "failed to cooperate."

The blacklist destroyed Fielding's embryonic career as an on-screen television host, but the talented musician survived what would be a decade-long exile from broadcasting by returning to his live performing and recording careers, both as a featured artist and a freelance arranger. In Las Vegas, Nevada he led a band at the Royal Las Vegas Hotel; in addition, he toured for the only time with his name orchestra, which also released several albums during this period, first for a little-known independent label, with Jerry Fielding Plays a Dance Concert (Trend, 1954), followed by Sweet with a Beat (1955), Fielding's Formula (1957), and Hollywoodwind Jazztet (1958), all on Decca. His jazz and pop background allowed him to survive while the blacklist destroyed the concert and film-based careers of musicians such as Schoenberg champion and film composer Louis Gruenberg and the first black Broadway and film star, Paul Robeson.

== The end of the blacklist ==
In 1959, musical star Betty Hutton insisted that the still-blacklisted Jerry Fielding direct her new series, The Betty Hutton Show, a television series for CBS, having gotten to know him while they were both working the music circuit in Las Vegas. Television had been a surreptitious haven for the blacklisted writers, directors and composers for many years, and it was Desilu Productions, founded by Lucille Ball, who'd briefly been a member of the Communist Party and also dragged before HUAC in the early 1950s, who backed Hutton's choice. With her own career hanging by a thread, Hutton – along with Desilu and CBS – made a brave stand against the blacklist in television, but the show unfortunately failed.

Fielding's career as a film composer did not begin until 1962, when leading Hollywood director Otto Preminger, himself a refugee of Nazism, hired him to compose the score for his all-star, Washington, D.C.-based adaptation of the best-selling novel, Advise and Consent. Preminger deliberately violated and thus finally ended the blacklist in American filmmaking – he released The Man with the Golden Arm in 1955 without the Production Code's seal of approval. He named blacklisted screenwriter Dalton Trumbo in his first onscreen film credit since his blacklisting fifteen years before in Exodus (1960). His hiring of blacklisted actor Franchot Tone and composer Fielding for Advise and Consent was particularly fitting for a film which attempted to expose the evil of innuendo and blacklisting in political Washington. It was his friend, prolific and long-suffering blacklistee Dalton Trumbo, who had suggested Fielding to Preminger for the job.

== Composing for the screen ==
Preminger had used Duke Ellington and his band for an all-jazz score for his pioneering realist trial drama Anatomy of a Murder (1959) – unusual at a time when most film scores were still lush symphonic orchestrations and even more unusually in that he featured the African-American Ellington and other band members in the film itself. It was the first to contain Fielding's ability to bring dark irony to his themes.

Fielding was now also free to write television scores for hit 1960 shows, Mission Impossible (1966) (though not the best known theme, which is by Lalo Schifrin) and Star Trek's second and third seasons. It was his composing for a contemporary made-for-TV Western, Noon Wine, directed by Sam Peckinpah, that led to Fielding's score for Peckinpah's first critical and box-office hit, The Wild Bunch (1969) as well as a collaboration between the two men. The Wild Bunch's quartet of gunmen, led by William Holden, are given voice largely through Fielding's score. The composer "caught the weariness, dust, dirt and blood of a vanishing West in a rich underscore that interspersed sprightly action cues with wistful Mexican folk melodies and nostalgic, bittersweet dirges", writes British film composer Heathcliff Blair. The soundtrack brought his first nomination for an Oscar for Best Dramatic Score.

"The Wild Bunch gave me a chance to illustrate to the public, and the entertainment industry, that if a composer is given real freedom to create, he can produce a score that is unlike any other ever written", Fielding said later. In his next film outing, the quaint English countryside is blown apart by sadistic violence in Peckinpah's second masterpiece, Straw Dogs (1971) in which Fielding for the first time used Stravinsky-influenced tone clusters, another highly-influential score whose echoes can be heard, for example, in the following year's The French Connection which has a brittle quarter-tone score by jazz composer Don Ellis. Straw Dogs was also followed by an Oscar nomination.

The following year, in Peckinpah's The Getaway (1972), a troubled production starring Steve McQueen and Ali MacGraw, Fielding's score was removed from the final picture. It was replaced by music of Quincy Jones, much to Fielding's shock and dismay, an ordeal documented in a short film by his wife, Camille and daughter Elizabeth Fielding in 2007. Peckinpah then asked Fielding to compose around songs by Bob Dylan, for Pat Garrett and Billy the Kid (1973). While already lionized for his protest and rock music by 1972, Dylan had no formal musical training whatsoever and Fielding eventually backed out in frustration. Despite this, Fielding returned to score Peckinpah's surreal anti-Western, Bring Me the Head of Alfredo Garcia (1974). In this black comedy Fielding again expresses the despairing subtext and unspoken whimsy of his frequently inchoate collaborator, this time in a film whose exercise in futility seems a personal statement by Peckinpah indeed. "In many ways, Sam doesn't know what the hell he's talking about", Fielding said of the director, whom he considered a close friend. "In other ways, he's a fantastically gifted man." Fielding claimed the two used to sort out their differences in fist fights.

Fielding had fruitful and rather less stressful relationships with two other leading 1970s action directors. For Michael Winner he demonstrated his versatility through six films, from the first jazz-tinged score for a Western in Lawman (1971) to the Gothic period melodrama The Nightcomers (1971), where Fielding delighted in creating a neo-Baroque orchestral score of which he was most proud. Winner would go on to team with Charles Bronson in Death Wish. His last film for Winner was the 1978 remake of The Big Sleep, starring Robert Mitchum and considered a classic of 1970s neo-LA Noir.

His collaboration with the famously jazz-loving Clint Eastwood began when Eastwood chose Fielding to compose the score to The Outlaw Josey Wales. Fielding presumably didn't know that the author of the original novel, Forrest Carter, was a Klansman and segregationist. Fielding, assuming he was scoring a popular young people's Western novel, researched and included Irish folk tunes from the Civil War, creating another newly explored direction for period films and winning his third and final Oscar nomination. On that Oscar night, Fielding was up against Jerry Goldsmith's The Omen, Lalo Schifrin's Voyage of the Damned, and the two final scores by his former hero in 1930s radio, prolific Hitchcock favorite Bernard Herrmann, for Scorsese's Taxi Driver and de Palma's Obsession. (Goldsmith won.)

In his next two films for Eastwood, Fielding employed urban scores featuring living jazz musicians for The Enforcer (1976) and The Gauntlet (1977). Other notable scores were for Demon Seed (1977), that included electronic instruments and atonal passages; and The Bad News Bears (1976), inspired by the 19th century opera Carmen by French composer, Georges Bizet.

His final scores were for the films Cries in the Night and Below the Belt (both 1980).

== Popular television themes ==
Fielding combined his film scores with television work, not an unusual combination at the time, particularly since the theme song for a hit television series could go on paying dividends for years, generating royalties every time it was played on the air. He scored two episodes of the first Star Trek: "The Trouble with Tribbles" and "Spectre of the Gun". He also wrote the title themes for what became enduring 1960s shows of the network era: Hogan's Heroes and The Bionic Woman, as well as Run, Buddy, Run; He & She. His last television theme tune was for the 1970 situation comedy The Tim Conway Show. He also did notable work with Kolchak: The Night Stalker (1974). His last television soundtrack, for the mini-series High Midnight, won an Emmy.

== Personal life ==
Fielding married twice, first to Kay Kyser band production assistant, Ann Parks(d), in December 1946 in Tijuana. They raised two children, Georgia and Hillary. This marriage ended in the spring of 1963. His second marriage took place on August 6, 1963, to Camille J. Williams, a Las Vegas dancer. They had two children.

=== Death ===
Fielding died, at the age of 57, from a heart attack followed by congestive heart failure, while in Toronto where he was scoring the film Cries in the Night. The film was released posthumously in October 1980.

Fielding's remains are interred in Crypt 30 at Glen Haven Memorial Park in Los Angeles.

== Filmography ==
Year	Title	Director	Notes
1962	The Nun and the Sergeant	Franklin Adreon	
1962	Advise & Consent	Otto Preminger	
1964	For Those Who Think Young	Leslie H. Martinson	
1964	McHale's Navy	Edward Montagne	
1965	McHale's Navy Joins the Air Force	Edward Montagne	
1969	The Wild Bunch	Sam Peckinpah	1st collaboration with Peckinpah
1970	Suppose They Gave a War and Nobody Came	Hy Averback	
1971	Lawman	Michael Winner	1st collaboration with Winner
1971	The Nightcomers	Michael Winner	
1971	Johnny Got His Gun	Dalton Trumbo	
1971	Straw Dogs	Sam Peckinpah	
1972	Chato's Land	Michael Winner	
1972	Junior Bonner	Sam Peckinpah	
1972	The Mechanic	Michael Winner	
1972	The Getaway	Sam Peckinpah	
1973	Scorpio	Michael Winner	
1973	The Outfit	John Flynn	
1974	The Super Cops	Gordon Parks	
1974	Bring Me the Head of Alfredo Garcia	Sam Peckinpah	
1974	The Gambler	Karel Reisz	
1975	The Killer Elite	Sam Peckinpah	
1975	The Black Bird	David Giler	
1976	The Bad News Bears	Michael Ritchie	
1976	The Outlaw Josey Wales	Clint Eastwood	
1976	The Enforcer	James Fargo	
1977	Demon Seed	Donald Cammell	
1977	Semi-Tough	Michael Ritchie	
1977	The Gauntlet	Clint Eastwood	
1978	The Big Sleep	Michael Winner	
1979	Beyond the Poseidon Adventure	Irwin Allen	
1979	Escape from Alcatraz	Don Siegel	
1980	Cries in the Night	William Fruet	Posthumous release
1980	Below the Belt	Robert Fowler	Posthumous release

=== Television ===
Year	Title	Notes
1952	The Jerry Fielding Show	15 episodes
1953-57	The Life of Riley	10 episodes
1959-60	The Betty Hutton Show	6 episodes
1961	Mister Ed	3 episodes
1961	Tell It to Groucho	
1961	The Tom Ewell Show	15 episodes
1962	The New March of Dimes Presents: The Scene Stealers	Special
1963	77 Sunset Strip	2 episodes
1964	Mr. and Mrs.	Special
1964	Low Man on a Totem Pole	Failed pilot
1967-1968	Star Trek: The Original Series	Episodes: "The Trouble with Tribbles" and "Spectre of the Gun"
1967-1969	Mission: Impossible	7 episodes
1967-1970	Mannix	6 episodes
1969-1970	The Governor & J.J.	8 episodes
1970	Hunters Are for Killing	Television film
1979	Mr. Horn	Television film

== Awards and honors ==
Award	Year	Category	Work	Result
Academy Award	1970	Best Original Score	The Wild Bunch	Nominated
Academy Award	1972	Best Original Score	Straw Dogs	Nominated
Academy Award	1977	Best Original Score	The Outlaw Josey Wales	Nominated
Emmy Award	1980	Outstanding Music Composition for a Limited Series, or Special	High Midnight	Won

On November 12, 2009, Fielding was awarded a lifetime achievement award for his composition in The Wild Bunch which celebrated its 40th anniversary. It was received by his daughter Claudia Fielding.
