= The Nightcomers =

1971 British film by Michael Winner

- Theatrical release poster
- Directed by: Michael Winner
- Written by: Michael Hastings
- Produced by: Elliott Kastner; Jay Kanter; Alan Ladd Jr.; Michael Winner
- Starring: Marlon Brando; Stephanie Beacham; Thora Hird; Harry Andrews
- Cinematography: Robert Paynter
- Music by: Jerry Fielding
- Production company: Scimitar Films
- Distributed by: Avco Embassy Pictures
- Release dates: 30 August 1971 (Venice); 15 February 1972 (New York City); 6 July 1972 (United Kingdom)
- Running time: 94 minutes
- Countries: United States; United Kingdom
- Language: English

The Nightcomers is a 1971 psychological horror film directed by Michael Winner and starring Marlon Brando, Stephanie Beacham, Thora Hird, Harry Andrews, and Anna Palk. It is a prequel to Henry James' 1898 novella The Turn of the Screw, which had already been adapted into The Innocents (1961). The film focuses on groundskeeper Peter Quint's corruption of Miss Jessel, a virtuous governess at an English manor, as well as the two children in her care.

A co-production between the United Kingdom and the United States, The Nightcomers was filmed on location in Cambridgeshire.

== Plot ==
Recently orphaned, Flora and Miles are abandoned by their new guardian and entrusted to the care of housekeeper Mrs. Grose, governess Miss Jessel, and Peter Quint, the former valet and now gardener. With only these three adults for company, the children live an isolated life in the sprawling country manor estate. The children are particularly fascinated by Peter Quint due to his eclectic knowledge and engaging stories, and willingness to entertain them. With this captive audience, Quint doses out his strange philosophies on love and death. The governess, Miss Jessel, also falls under Peter's spell, and despite her repulsion the two embark on a sadomasochistic love affair. Flora and Miles become fascinated with this relationship, and help Quint and Jessel to escape the interference of disapproving Mrs. Grose.

The children begin spying on Quint and Jessel's violent trysts and mimic what they see, including the bondage, culminating in Miles nearly pushing Flora off a building to her death. Mrs. Grose determines to write to the absent master of the house in order to get both Quint and Jessel sacked. The children are most distressed by this, and decide to take matters into their own hands to prevent the separation. Acting on Quint's assertions that love is hate and it is only in death that people can truly be united, the children murder Miss Jessel by knocking a hole in the boat she uses to wait for Quint (who never keeps the appointments), knowing that she cannot swim. Quint later finds Miss Jessel's rigid body in the water, but is given little time to mourn before Miles kills him with a bow and arrow. The film ends with the arrival of a new governess, presumably the one who features in The Turn of the Screw.

== Cast ==
- Marlon Brando as Peter Quint
- Stephanie Beacham as Miss Jessel
- Thora Hird as Mrs. Grose
- Harry Andrews as Master of the house
- Verna Harvey as Flora
- Christopher Ellis as Miles
- Anna Palk as new governess

== Production ==
=== Development ===
The film was based on an original script by Michael Hastings. He started with the beginning of the Turn of the Screw and plotted backwards. He says he wanted the two lead characters to be "plausible... based on their strange eroticism."

The children in the film are portrayed as being a few years older than in the Henry James novel. Reviewer Brian Holcomb sees the reason for this in the sexual nature of the film and their roles in it (Verna Harvey was in fact 19 at the time).

=== Casting ===
Brando's casting was announced in November 1970. Filming took place in February and March 1971.

=== Filming ===
The manor house in the film is Sawston Hall, a 16th-century Tudor manor house in Sawston, Cambridgeshire.

== Release and reception ==
The film opened at the 32nd Venice International Film Festival on 30 August 1971. It premiered in New York City on 15 February 1972, and opened in the United Kingdom later that year, on 6 July 1972.

=== Box office ===
The film was a commercial disappointment at the box office. However Michael Winner claimed the film made its money back, adding "it was only the sex and violence that made it profitable. It was rather an intellectual piece, but without the violence it would have gone nowhere at all."

=== Critical response ===
The Monthly Film Bulletin wrote: "The Nightcomers attempts to reconstruct the fictional events that lead up to the beginning of Henry James' The Turn of the Screw and form a macabre unwritten background to the tale. It's a compelling idea, but sadly inspiration stops at the film's conception. ... Though the contrast between Mrs. Grose's snobbish gentility and the increasing permissiveness of her household provide several nice comic moments, Hastings' pseudo-Jamesian dialogue goes through some very sticky patches ("You look at me as if it were a misdemeanour of some proportion") and Marlon Brando's Quint alternates eccentrically between brooding Method silences and stage-Irish buffoonery. The death-blow is finally dealt by Michael Winner's direction, with its over-insistent use of the zoom, its unerring eye for the wrong camera set-up and its chronic inability to build suspense through whole sequences. If the original script contained the germ of a good idea, it's well and truly lost in this vulgar and artless film."

Tom Milne described it as "a film crass enough to have the outraged ghost of Henry James haunting Wardour Street". Milne also criticised Hastings' script, stating his dialogue "sounds embarrassingly like a Cockney nanny doing her best to be genteel".

Leonard Maltin blamed Winner's "poor direction" for hurting the film's attempt to chronicle the original story's preceding events.

Some reviewers have objected to the film's premise of showing what happened before the novel, as this threatens the ambiguity the novel explores.

=== Accolades ===
Brando's performance earned him a nomination for the 1973 BAFTA Award for Best Actor in a Leading Role, but recent audiences have criticised his cartoonish Irish accent. The film has a 57% critics' rating at Rotten Tomatoes.

== See also ==
- Cinema of the United Kingdom
