= Lawman (film) =

1971 American Western film

- Theatrical release poster
- Directed by: Michael Winner
- Written by: Gerald Wilson
- Produced by: Michael Winner
- Starring: Burt Lancaster; Robert Ryan; Lee J. Cobb; Sheree North; Robert Duvall
- Cinematography: Robert Paynter
- Edited by: Frederick Wilson
- Music by: Jerry Fielding
- Production company: Scimitar Films
- Distributed by: United Artists
- Release dates: March 11, 1971 (United Kingdom); August 4, 1971 (United States)
- Running time: 99 minutes
- Country: United States
- Language: English
- Budget: $3 million
- Box office: $5.9 million (U.S./Canada)

Lawman is a 1971 American revisionist Western film produced and directed by Michael Winner and starring Burt Lancaster, Robert Ryan, Lee J. Cobb, Sheree North and Robert Duvall. The screenplay by Gerald Wilson focuses on Jered Maddox, a by-the-book Deputy U.S. Marshal who arrives in a small town to arrest a group of cowboys for the accidental, negligent homicide of an elderly man. The events of the Deputy's attempt to serve arrest warrants sparks a conflict between his absolute adherence to the law and the community's pragmatic desire for peace.

Filmed on location in Durango, Mexico, Lawman was Winner's first Western and his first American production. The film explores themes of justice, obsession, and the changing nature of the American frontier. It received mixed reviews upon release but has since garnered appreciation for its moral complexity and performances.

== Plot synopsis ==
A group of cowboys from the town of Sabbath, Montana Territory (fictional) employed by wealthy cattle baron Vincent Bronson, pass through the town of Bannock, Montana Territory (non-fictional). In their reckless, drunken celebration, they shoot up Bannock; accidentally killing an elderly man and causing a fire in a store when an oil lamp gets struck by one of their bullets. They return to Sabbath unaware of the death.

Deputy U.S. Marshal Jered Maddox, who's stationed in Bannock, rides to Sabbath carrying the body of Marc Corman. Corman was one of the cowboys involved in the Bannock incident, killed by Deputy Maddox when Corman drew his gun on him. Maddox visits the local Town Marshal Cotton Ryan and presents arrest warrants for the remaining men involved in the incident; Vernon Adams, Choctaw Lee, Jack Dekker, Harvey Stenbaugh and Hurd Price. Ryan, an aging and compromised lawman whose job depends on Bronson's influence, warns Deputy Maddox that Bronson effectively owns the town and that arresting his men will be impossible. Maddox remains undeterred, stating he will "kill these men where they stand" if they do not surrender within 24 hours.

Ryan rides to Bronson's ranch to inform him of the situation and arrest warrants for his employees. Bronson is a reasonable man who regrets the accidental shooting death and damage to the Town of Bannock so he offers to pay a generous compensation to the victim's family and the Town of Bannock itself. Deputy Maddox refuses the offers, insisting that "the law is the law". Bronson's ranch foreman, Harvey Stenbaugh, suggests killing Deputy Maddox, but Bronson initially insists on deconfliction and negotiation.

Deputy Maddox encounters former girlfriend, Laura Shelby, who now lives in Sabbath with her current boyfriend Hurd Price, one of the wanted men. After they spend an intimate night together, Shelby pleads with Maddox to show mercy to the wanted men but he refuses to compromise his code as a U.S. Marshal. The next morning, Maddox visits Town Marshal Ryan and reveals that he has changed his mind and no longer intends to return to Bannock with prisoners, inferring that he intends to kill them. As tensions rise, Stenbaugh, accompanied by Crowe, defies Bronson's orders and attempts to kill by Deputy Maddox by calling him out for a gunfight in the middle of town, forcing the Deputy to kill him in self-defense. This encounter escalates the conflict, leading Bronson's other men to believe they must kill Maddox to survive.

Crowe Wheelwright, a young gunfighter working for Bronson, is intrigued by Maddox's reputation but eventually becomes disillusioned by the senseless violence. One by one, the wanted men confront Maddox and are killed, despite Maddox's proclamation that he does not seek bloodshed, only compliance with the law.

The violence culminates in a confrontation on Sabbath's main street, during which Deputy Maddox uncharacteristically shoots a fleeing Hurd Price in the back. Bronson, grieving the death of his son Jason, who committed suicide after believing he had failed his father and realizing the destruction his pride has wrought, confronts Maddox but ultimately kills himself in the street. With the warrants served or the fugitives dead, Maddox rides out of Sabbath, past a grieving Laura Shelby, leaving a broken community in his wake.

== Cast ==
- Burt Lancaster as Deputy U.S. Marshal Jered Maddox
- Robert Ryan as Town Marshal Cotton Ryan
- Lee J. Cobb as Vincent Bronson
- Robert Duvall as Vernon Adams
- Sheree North as Laura Shelby
- Albert Salmi as Harvey Stenbaugh
- J. D. Cannon as Hurd Price
- Joseph Wiseman as Lucas
- Richard Jordan as Crowe Wheelwright
- John McGiver as Mayor Sam Bolden
- Ralph Waite as Jack Dekker
- John Beck as Jason Bronson
- William C. Watson as Choctaw Lee
- Walter Brooke as Luther Harris
- Robert Emhardt as Hersham
- Richard Bull as Dusaine
- John Hillerman as Totts
- Hugh McDermott as L.G. Moss
- Wilford Brimley as Marc Corman (uncredited)

== Production ==
=== Development ===
The screenplay was written by Gerald Wilson, who sought to challenge the traditional Western mythos. He was inspired by the journals of Charlie Siringo, a detective and cowboy, which suggested that lawmen in the Old West were often the primary instigators of violence. Wilson intended to convey the theme that "law and order is certainly not the only way to administer justice." The project was considered a loose remake of the 1955 film Man with the Gun, which starred Robert Mitchum.

British director Michael Winner was attached to direct, marking his first Western and his first production in the United States. Winner expressed a desire to avoid the "spaghetti Western" aesthetic of filming in Spain, seeking instead a location with "an American influence."

=== Filming ===
Principal photography began in April 1970. The film was shot on location in Durango, Mexico, and Chupadero, New Mexico. Winner secured the Durango location shortly before Howard Hawks attempted to book it for Rio Lobo (1970). Winner strove for authenticity in the production design, noting in later interviews that he insisted on accurate period details, such as importing authentic oil lamps from London's Portobello Road rather than using prop recreations.

Winner described his approach to the genre as an outsider: "The West is everybody's... Americans come to Britain to film English history. Why shouldn't an Englishman go west?" He also commented on the practical difficulties of the genre, describing the West as "vulgar" and "dirty."

== Reception ==
=== Critical response ===
Upon its release, Lawman received mixed reviews. Howard Thompson of The New York Times called the film "a potent but curiously exasperating Western" with "a baffling, oblique arrogance about the central character... that belies his seeming quest for justice." Roger Ebert of the Chicago Sun-Times gave the film two stars out of four, describing it as "a Western with a lot of sides but no center," and criticized the villainous characters as "monotonously bad." Gene Siskel of the Chicago Tribune awarded two-and-a-half stars, praising the cast but finding the story "depressing and poorly conceived."

Variety was more positive, calling it "quite entertaining" and praising Lancaster as "highly convincing." The review highlighted Lee J. Cobb's performance, noting he "quietly steals the film as the local boss who, unlike many in such films, is no ruthless villain." Kevin Thomas of the Los Angeles Times also praised the film as "a good solid western."

Modern reception has been generally more favorable, with critics acknowledging the film's revisionist themes. On the review aggregator website Rotten Tomatoes, 63% of 8 critics' reviews are positive, with an average rating of 6.2/10. Time Out described it as a "typically ham-fisted Western... [which] ultimately resorts to killing and ketchup to make up for its lack of style and originality," though it noted the similarities to Man with the Gun.

=== Home media ===
In the United States, the film was released on Blu-ray by Twilight Time in 2017, featuring an isolated score track by composer Jerry Fielding.

== Notes ==
- Clinch, Minty (1986). Burt Lancaster. Stein and Day.
