= Scorpio (film) =

1973 film by Michael Winner

- Theatrical release poster by Robert McGinnis
- Directed by: Michael Winner
- Written by: David W. Rintels; Gerald Wilson
- Produced by: Walter Mirisch
- Starring: Burt Lancaster; Alain Delon; Paul Scofield; John Colicos; Gayle Hunnicutt
- Music by: Jerry Fielding
- Production companies: The Mirisch Corporation; Scimitar Films
- Distributed by: United Artists
- Release date: April 19, 1973
- Running time: 114 minutes
- Country: United States
- Language: English
- Budget: $4 million
- Box office: $1.4 million (US/ Canada rentals); 1,052,001 admissions (France)

Scorpio is a 1973 American spy film directed by Michael Winner and written by David W. Rintels and Gerald Wilson. It stars Burt Lancaster, Alain Delon, and Paul Scofield. Delon plays the title character, a hitman hired by the CIA to assassinate his mentor (Lancaster), a former agent suspected of treason. The film's score was composed by Jerry Fielding.

== Plot ==
Cross is an experienced, but retiring Central Intelligence Agency (CIA) agent and assassin who is training freelance hitman Jean Laurier, alias Scorpio, to replace him. Cross is teaching him as much about protecting himself from his patrons and never trusting anyone as how to get away clean.

The CIA tells Scorpio to kill Cross for suspected treason and collaboration with the Soviets, but Cross gets to him first and pays him a large sum of money. Scorpio travels back to the US with Cross, where Cross visits his wife and Laurier visits his sister and girlfriend, who are roommates. The CIA continue to pressure Scorpio into assassinating Cross, but he proves reluctant until the CIA break into his apartment and frame Laurier with a narcotics charge. His only choice is to take the job and terminate Cross. Understanding that the CIA wants him out, Cross flees to Vienna in disguise and reunites with his Soviet opposite and friend, Sergei Zharkov who provides him a safehouse. Scorpio follows Cross' trail to Vienna. Cross intends to bring his wife out from the US and get out of the spy business. Despite blown covers and many failed CIA attempts to ambush him, Cross manages to stay one step ahead of his pursuers.

In a failed break-in at Cross's home, CIA agents shoot and kill his wife Sarah, causing Cross to return to America. He rejects protection from Zharkov, whose agency wants to know secrets he knows as a senior field agent. Zharkov helps Cross to cover his tracks and reach America. Cross evades capture by the CIA and manages to kill McLeod, the agency director responsible for his wife's death. CIA wants Cross' head on a platter and contracts Scorpio again.

The new CIA director and Scorpio's handler Filchock shows him evidence that Cross might have collaborated in the past with other foreign agents and was able to make a hefty sum from it. Following surveillance video of a potential meet up between Cross's wife and accomplice at the Library of Congress, Scorpio sees his girlfriend walking out as well and comes to realization that she is working with Cross.

Enraged by this, Scorpio corners Cross and Susan and kills his girlfriend instantly without remorse. Cross says she was a Czech courier and he is just a middleman between their agency for staying in the game and did not betray Scorpio. Scorpio finishes off Cross after hearing his last words of wisdom. Moments later, Scorpio is also shot by a mysterious assailant, as Cross had earlier predicted.

== Cast ==
- Burt Lancaster as Cross
- Alain Delon as Jean Laurier / Scorpio
- Paul Scofield as Sergei Zharkov
- John Colicos as McLeod
- Gayle Hunnicutt as Susan
- J.D. Cannon as Filchock
- Joanne Linville as Sarah Cross
- Mel Stewart as Pick
- Vladek Sheybal as Zemetkin
- Mary Maude as Anne
- Jack Colvin as Paul Milney
- James Sikking as Harris
- Burke Byrnes as Morrison
- William Smithers as Mitchell
- Shmuel Rodensky as Lang
- Celeste Yarnall as Helen Thomas
- Sandor Elès as Malkin
- Frederick Jaeger as Novins
- George Mikell as Dor
- Robert Emhardt as Man in Hotel

== Production ==
The film was based on a script by David W. Rintels which had been bought by Walter Mirisch, who had a deal with United Artists. Michael Winner came on board to direct but wanted a rewrite. Mirisch disagreed so Winner dropped out. Then United Artists decided to remove Mirisch from the project and gave control over to Winner (although Mirisch kept a producer credit). It would be one of the last films made by Mirisch for United Artists.

Winner brought in his regular writer, Gerard Wilson, to do a rewrite. Delon and Lancaster were cast in April 1972. Lancaster's fee was $750,000 plus ten percent of the profits.

Winner said he agreed to do the film because it was a more serious spy film in the vein of The Spy Who Came in From the Cold. "And it has a good plot," he added. "Unexpected things happen." He was also attracted to the theme "the problems of men who have opted out of normal society to make their own way." He says many of his movies dealt with this.

Filming took place in Washington, Vienna and Paris. Filming began May 29, 1972 and went until mid August. The unit filmed at the Watergate Hotel and were staying there the night of the notorious break in.

Despite a script which showed the CIA assassinating people and involved with various nefarious plots, Winner was given permission to shoot in the CIA Headquarters in Langley, Virginia. Scenes at Cross's home were actually filmed at then CIA Director Richard Helms's home in NW Washington D.C. Arnold Picker, Chairman of United Artists, was surprised that the CIA would allow such a thing and insisted that Winner show them a copy of the script before shooting began. He did so and approval was granted, making Scorpio the first movie ever shot on location at their Headquarters.

Lancaster later said the film was "nothing incisive, just a lot of action" and was "one of those things you do as part of your living, but you try to avoid doing them as much as you can."

== Release ==
The film was given an X rating in England but this was overturned on appeal.

=== Critical reception ===
Reviewing Scorpio for Time Out magazine, Geoff Andrew took a negative view of the film: "Winner directs with typically crass abandon, wasting a solid performance from Lancaster".

On Rotten Tomatoes, the film holds a 59% rating from 22 reviews with the consensus: "Burt Lancaster and Alain Delon add some much-needed weight, but Scorpio doesn't offer much that spy thriller fans haven't already seen before."

== Home media ==
Scorpio was released on DVD by MGM Home Entertainment on April 1, 2003, as a Region 1 widescreen DVD.

A Limited Edition (3,000 units) was released by Twilight Time on November 10, 2015, as a Region A Blu-ray. It features an audio commentary by film historians Lem Dobbs, Julie Kirgo, and Nick Redman.

== See also ==
- List of American films of 1973
