= Jennifer Gan =

American actress (1938–2000)

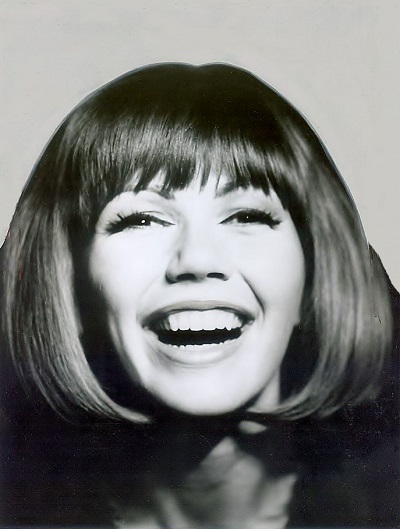
- Ginny Gan circa 1967
- Born: Virginia Gan; March 2, 1938; Detroit, Michigan, US
- Died: September 15, 2000 (aged 62); Los Angeles, California, US
- Other name: Ginny Gan
- Occupation: Actress
- Years active: 1958–1972

Jennifer Gan (March 2, 1938 – September 15, 2000) was an American stage, film and television actress. She appeared in sixteen film and TV titles in the 1960s and early 1970s.

== Career as Ginny Gan ==
A life member of The Actors Studio, she first began her career as Ginny Gan on the stage in musicals such as Li'l Abner in 1958, The Pink Jungle in 1959 starring Ginger Rogers and Agnes Moorehead, and No Strings in 1962. She made her first TV appearance in a popular Alfred Hitchcock Hour episode in late 1964. She then appeared on stage in the musical Guys and Dolls, in 1965 with actress Sheila MacRae.

She was seen again in the spring of 1967 making four more film and TV appearances. She appeared in the James Coburn spy spoof sequel In Like Flint and his tongue in cheek western Waterhole No. 3. She then appeared in an episode in the last season of the hit TV show The Monkees. She also had an uncredited role in the hit film Valley of the Dolls. She also appeared in the stage play The Two Gentlemen of Verona.

In 1968, she appeared in an episode in the last season of the hit TV show Batman. She then was cast in the hit family comedy film Yours, Mine and Ours. She had a speaking role with Henry Fonda in the coffee house scenes when he was on his big first date with Lucille Ball in the popular film.

== Career as Jennifer Gan ==
In 1969, she changed her name to Jennifer Gan and continued performing until late 1972. She made appearances in episodes of The Virginian and Ironside. She then began a professional association with Roger Corman that lasted through two B movies. The first was Naked Angels where she starred as a biker chick, clad in leather and lace. The film featured a soundtrack co-written by fuzz guitarist Jeff Simmons. She also appeared as a dancer in the feature film Hello, Dolly!.

In 1970, she appeared in a first-season episode of the popular TV shows Love, American Style and Marcus Welby, M.D.. In 1971, she starred in her second Roger Corman film, Women in Cages. In 1972, she appeared in an episode of Nichols and made an appearance in the film The Great Northfield Minnesota Raid. She made her final onscreen appearance in a fourth-season episode of Marcus Welby, M.D., in 1972.

Gan died on September 15, 2000.

== Stage credits ==
Date	Production	Role
1958	Li'l Abner	Stupefyin' Jones
1959	The Pink Jungle	Dancer
1962	No Strings	Dancer
1965	Guys and Dolls	Dancer
1967	The Two Gentlemen of Verona	Dancer

== Filmography ==
Year	Title	Role	Notes	Worked With
1964	Alfred Hitchcock Hour	First Worker	Episode: "Consider Her Ways"	Leif Erickson, Barbara Barrie, Gladys Cooper, Ellen Corby, Virginia Grey
1967	In Like Flint	Amazon #2	Feature film credited as Ginny Gan	James Coburn, Jean Hale, Lee J. Cobb, Anna Lee
1967	Waterhole No. 3	Dove	Feature film uncredited	James Coburn, Carroll O'Connor, Claude Akins, James Whitmore, Bruce Dern
1967	The Monkees	Ann	S2:E10, "The Wild Monkees"	Michael Nesmith, Davey Jones, Micky Dolenz, Peter Tork, Henry Corden, Norman Grabowski
1967	Valley of the Dolls	Show Girl Actress	Feature film uncredited	Barbara Parkins
1968	Batman	First Policewoman	Episode: "Nora Clavicle and the Ladies' Crime Club"	Larry Gelman, Jean Byron
1968	Yours, Mine and Ours	First Young Lady	Feature film credited as Ginny Gan	Henry Fonda, Lucille Ball, Van Johnson
1969	The Virginian	Minnie	Episode: "The Ordeal"	Doug McClure, Robert Pine
1969	Ironside	Chickie	Episode: "Puzzlelock"	Don Galloway
1969	Naked Angels	Marlene	Feature film star billing	Michael Greene, Richard Rust, Corey Fischer, Penelope Spheeris
1969	Hello, Dolly!	Miss Bolivia	Feature film uncredited	Dance troupe
1970	Love, American Style	Gorgeous Redhead	Segment: "Love and the King"	Herb Edelman, Kathie Browne
1970	Marcus Welby, M.D.	Raylene Kohl	Episode: "Nobody Wants a Fat Jockey"	James Brolin, Michael Burns, JoAnna Cameron
1971	Women in Cages	Carol “Jeff” Jeffries	Feature film star billing	Pam Grier, Roberta Collins
1972	Nichols	Gloria	Episode: "The Unholy Alliance"	James Garner, Margot Kidder, Noam Pitlik, Neva Patterson, Stuart Margolin, John Beck, Liam Dunn
1972	The Great Northfield Minnesota Raid	Abbie	Feature film uncredited	Cliff Robertson, Dana Elcar
1972	Marcus Welby, M.D.	Marcia Denny	Episode: "We'll Walk Out of Here Together"	Robert Young, Dana Elcar, Ann Doran
