= Cristina Raines =

American former actress and model (born 1952)

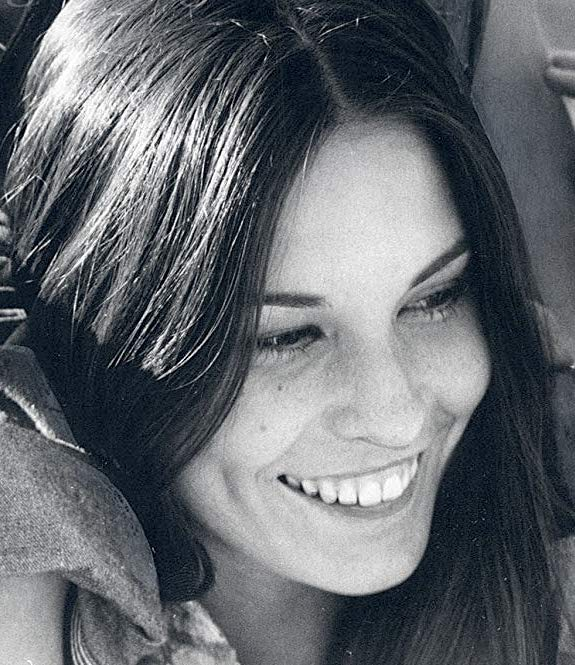
- Raines in Sunshine (1973)
- Born: Cristina Herazo; February 28, 1952 (age 74); Manila, Philippines
- Other names: Tina Herazo; Cristina Raines Crowe; Cristina Herazo Crowe
- Occupations: Former actress and model; nurse
- Years active: 1971–1991
- Spouse: Christopher Crowe (m. 1986; div. 1996)
- Partner: Keith Carradine (1971–1979)
- Children: 2
- Relatives: Victoria Herazo (sister)

Cristina Raines (née Herazo; born February 28, 1952) is an American former actress and model who appeared in numerous films throughout the 1970s, mainly horror films and period pieces. She went on to have a prolific career as a television actress throughout the 1980s.

Born in Manila, Philippines to American parents, Raines was primarily raised in Florida. After graduating from high school, she relocated to New York City to pursue a career as a model, and signed with the Ford Modeling Agency. Urged by Eileen Ford to audition for acting roles, Raines was subsequently cast as a lead in the independent horror film Hex (1973), opposite Keith Carradine and Scott Glenn. She had a minor part in the Charles Bronson thriller The Stone Killer, followed by a lead in the television film Sunshine, in which she played a young mother with terminal cancer.

In 1975, Raines was cast in a supporting role in Robert Altman's ensemble comedy Nashville, portraying a folk singer, followed by a lead in the supernatural horror film The Sentinel (1977), in which she starred as a model tormented by supernatural goings-on in her new apartment building. Raines also co-starred in Ridley Scott's directorial debut, The Duellists (1977), a period piece based on the Napoleonic Wars.

Raines had her first major television role in the twelve-part miniseries Centennial (1978), playing the daughter of a fur trapper in 1800s Colorado. Raines continued to act throughout the 1980s, with such film credits as the anthology horror film Nightmares (1983). She spent the majority of the decade acting in television, notably with a lead role on the NBC series Flamingo Road (1980–1982). In both this and Centennial, she played a love interest of the characters played by Mark Harmon. She appeared as Poppea in the miniseries Quo Vadis? in 1985, followed by guest-starring roles on Riptide (1985), Hotel (1987), Highway to Heaven (1988) and The Highwaymen (1988). In 1991, she formally retired from acting and pursued a career as a nurse, specializing in patients undergoing kidney dialysis.

== Life and career ==
=== 1952–1970: Early life ===
Raines was born February 28, 1952, in Manila, Philippines, to American parents. Her father, Pedro Nel Herazo, was a chemical engineer who managed the Far East operations of Procter & Gamble, while her mother, Shirley Mae Herazo, worked as a dressmaker. Raines was one of five daughters whose paternal grandfather was an immigrant from Colombia. Their paternal grandmother was of Swedish and German ancestry, while their mother Shirley is of Scots-Irish descent. Raines' sister Victoria Herazo was a member of the US Olympic team for racewalking.

The family lived in various places due to Pedro Herazo's work. In her early childhood, Raines resided with her family in Venezuela, before spending the majority of her childhood in Coral Gables, Florida. She graduated from high school in Boston, Massachusetts, and subsequently attended the Chandler School for Women, a Boston business college, where she trained to work as a secretary. Following high school, she considered becoming a veterinarian and was accepted into a veterinary school, but decided to forgo the acceptance when her uncle, an advertising executive, suggested she work as a model owing to her tall, slim figure.

=== 1971–1979: Modeling and acting ===
Around 1970, Raines relocated to New York City, where she signed a modeling contract with Ford Models. The company's executive, Eileen Ford, felt that Raines had the potential to be an actress, and urged her to attend local auditions. Raines was reluctant but eventually acquiesced to Ford's pressure, auditioning for a lead role in the period piece horror film Hex (1973), opposite Keith Carradine and Gary Busey. Billed as Tina Herazo, she portrayed a Native American woman whose sister curses a gang of motorcyclists. Raines and Carradine began dating during the making of the film, which was shot in South Dakota in the fall of 1971. The couple went on to have a long-term relationship that lasted until 1979. Raines later commented that in her early career, agents often tried to cast her in Spanish-speaking roles due to her Hispanic features and Spanish surname, though Raines was not fluent in Spanish. This served as an impetus for her to alter her surname to expand her casting opportunities in film: "If you were born Cristina Herazo and went into films, wouldn't you change it?" she commented in 1983. "I had to find another name in a hurry, looked out of the window and it was raining. There it was. Raines."

Her next film appearance was a minor role portraying the daughter of Charles Bronson's character in the thriller The Stone Killer (1973), directed by Michael Winner, before she was cast in Joseph Sargent's biographical television film Sunshine (1973), in which she portrayed a 20-year-old mother who receives a terminal cancer diagnosis. She subsequently had a supporting part as a folk singer in Robert Altman's ensemble comedy Nashville (1975) (opposite Keith Carradine). Around this time, Raines signed a contract with Universal Pictures, and appeared in several films for the studio, though she later admitted that the contract "became very detrimental" to her career, and prevented her from doing numerous films. She reunited with director Michael Winner to appear in his supernatural horror film The Sentinel (1977), followed by a lead role in Ridley Scott's directorial debut The Duellists (also 1977), in which she co-starred with Carradine, and which focused on soldiers during the Napoleonic Wars. She subsequently co-starred as a central character in the 1978 television miniseries Centennial. Based on a novel by James Michener, the program was a 26-hour epic depicting the history of Colorado and is one of the first groundbreaking miniseries' created for television. Raines' role was that of Lucinda McKeag Zendt, an Arapaho and French-Canadian woman.

In 1979, Raines and Carradine separated, and she went on to star in the British motor-racing film Silver Dream Racer (1980) opposite Beau Bridges, and the drama Touched by Love (also 1980), co-starring with Diane Lane. From 1980 to 1982, she portrayed Lane Ballou, an exotic dancer and the mistress of a deputy in the NBC series Flamingo Road. Raines later appeared as a woman pursued by a killer in the anthology film Nightmares (1983) for Universal, originally slated to be a television series. In 1984, she starred opposite Rupert Everett in the comedy-drama film Real Life.

=== 1985–present: leaves acting for nursing ===
Raines continued to appear in television, with guest-starring roles on Murder, She Wrote; The Love Boat; and Riptide. In 1985, she starred as Poppaea in the international miniseries Quo Vadis?, based on Henryk Sienkiewicz's 1896 novel of the same name. In 1986, she married writer and producer Christopher Crowe; together, the couple has two children. Raines' final feature film credit was in the surfing drama, North Shore (1987). She formally retired from acting in 1991, and became a registered nurse, specializing in patients undergoing kidney dialysis.

== Filmography ==
=== Film ===
Year	Title	Role	Director(s)	Notes	Ref.
1973	Hex	Oriole	Leo Garen	Billed as Tina Herazo	
1973	Stacey	Pamela Chambers	Andy Sidaris		
1973	The Stone Killer	Mathews' Daughter	Michael Winner		
1973	Sunshine	Kate Hayden	Joseph Sargent	Television film	
1975	Nashville	Mary	Robert Altman		
1975	Russian Roulette	Bogna Kirchoff	Lou Lombardo		
1977	The Sentinel	Alison Parker	Michael Winner		
1977	The Duellists	Adele d'Hubert	Ridley Scott		
1979	The Child Stealer	Karen	Mel Damski	Television film	
1979	The Tenth Month	Nancy Miller	Joan Tewkesbury	Television film	
1980	Silver Dream Racer	Julie Prince	David Wickes		
1980	Touched by Love	Amy	Gus Trikonis		
1981	The Nashville Grab	Laurel Ellison	James L. Conway	Television film	
1983	Nightmares	Lisa	Joseph Sargent	Segment: "Terror in Topanga"	
1984	Real Life	Laurel	Francis Megahy	Also known as: Livin' the Life	
1984	The Return of Marcus Welby, M.D.	Nicki St. Hilaire	Alexander Singer	Television film	
1985	Streets of Justice	Assistant District Attorney Carol Nielson	Christopher Crowe	Television film	
1987	North Shore	Rick's Mother	William Phelps		
2003	Melinda's World	Amelia McCormack	David Baumgarten		

=== Television ===
Year	Title	Role	Notes	Ref.
1974	Movin' On	Rita	Episode: "High Rollers"	
1975	Doctors' Hospital	Dr. Terry Antonelli	Episode: "Point of Maximum Pressure"	
1975	The Family Holvak	Ellen Baldwin	Episodes: "First Love: Part 1"; "First Love: Part 2"	
1975	Baretta	Holly	Episode: "A Bite of the Apple"; unaired footage filmed by Monte Hellman	
1977	Kojak	Janelle Rawlings	Episode: "Letters of Death"	
1978	Loose Change	Kate Evans	Miniseries	
1978	Centennial	Lucinda McKeag Zendt	Miniseries	
1980	Flamingo Road	Lane Ballou	Television film / pilot	
1981–1982	Flamingo Road	Lane Ballou	38 episodes	
1983	Simon & Simon	Amanda McKay	Episode: "The List"	
1983	T. J. Hooker	Nancy Winters	Episode: "Raw Deal"	
1983	The Love Boat	Christine Burton	Episode: "Julie the Bachelor / Intensive Care / Set Up for Romance"	
1983	Hotel	Diana Aikins	Episode: "Designs"	
1984	Fantasy Island	Katie McCallum-Pride	Episode: "Goin' on Home / Ambitious Lady"	
1984	Matt Houston	Commissioner Lisa Taylor	Episode: "Death Match"	
1984	Masquerade		Episode: "Spying Down to Rio"	
1984	Finder of Lost Loves	Beth Farley	Episode: "Losing Touch"	
1985	The Fall Guy	Helen Bolton	Episode: "Semi-Catastrophe"	
1985	Murder, She Wrote	Margo Santana	Episode: "Paint Me a Murder"	
1985	The Love Boat	Jennifer Kearn	Episode: "Vicki's Gentleman Caller / Partners to the End / The Perfect Arrangement"	
1985	Quo Vadis?	Poppaea	Miniseries	
1985	Hammer House of Mystery and Suspense	Nancy Irving	Episode: "The Late Nancy Irving"	
1985	Generation	Roma Breed	Pilot	
1985	Riptide	Renee St. Claire	Episode: "Thirty-Six Hours 'til Dawn"	
1985	Alfred Hitchcock Presents	Julie Randall	Episode: "Prisoners"	
1987	Hotel	Kate Berrenger	Episode: "Second Thoughts"	
1988	The Highwayman	Pepper McKenzie	Episode: "The Hitchhiker"	
1988	Highway to Heaven	Commander Kimberley Michaels	Episode: "Hello and Farewell"	
1988	Moonlighting	Joan Spring	Episode: "Between a Yuk and a Hard Place"	
1990	Hunter	Laurie Conway-Sanders	Episode: "Broken Dreams"	
1990	Hardball	Dory	Episode: "Sex, Cops, and Videotape"	
1991	WIOU	Susan Green	Episode: "Three Women and a Baby"	

== Sources ==
- Abbott, Jon (2009). Stephen J. Cannell Television Productions: A History of All Series and Pilots. Jefferson, North Carolina: McFarland. ISBN 978-0-786-45401-3.
- Fellner, Chris (2019). The Encyclopedia of Hammer Films. New York: Rowman & Littlefield. ISBN 978-1-538-12659-2.
- Hischak, Thomas S. (2014). American Literature on Stage and Screen: 525 Works and Their Adaptations. Jefferson, North Carolina: McFarland. ISBN 978-0-786-49279-4.
- Kinnard, Roy (1992). Divine Images: A History of Jesus on the Screen. New York: Carol Publishing Group. ISBN 978-0-806-51284-6.
- Mansour, David (2011). From Abba to Zoom: A Pop Culture Encyclopedia of the Late 20th Century. Kansas City, Missouri: Andrews McMeel Pub. ISBN 978-0-740-79307-3.
- Parish, James Robert; Terrace, Vincent (1989). The Complete Actors' Television Credits, 1948-1988. Lanham, Maryland: Scarecrow Press. ISBN 978-0-810-82258-0.
- Stuart, Jan (2003). The Nashville Chronicles: The Making of Robert Altman's Masterpiece. New York: Limelight Editions. ISBN 978-0-879-10981-3.
- Terrace, Vincent (2014). Encyclopedia of Television Shows, 1925 Through 2010 (2nd ed.). Jefferson, North Carolina: McFarland. ISBN 978-0-786-48641-0.
