= Cliff DeYoung =

American actor

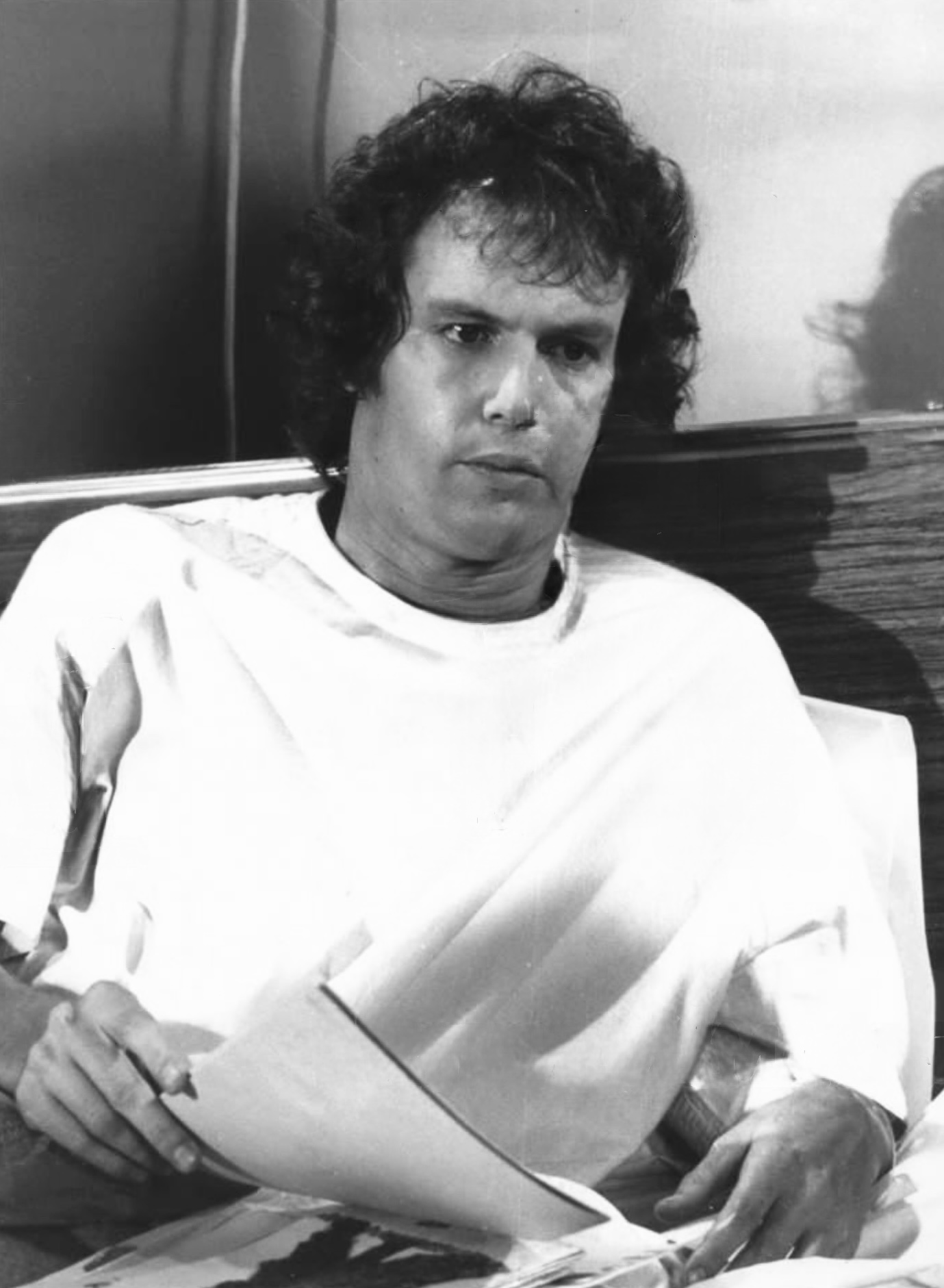
- DeYoung in Sunshine, 1975
- Born: Clifford Tobin DeYoung; February 12, 1945 (age 81); Los Angeles, California, U.S.
- Occupations: Actor; musician
- Years active: 1966-present
- Spouse: Gypsy Kvenvold (m. 1970)
- Children: 1 daughter, with Kvenvold

Clifford Tobin DeYoung (born February 12, 1945) is an American actor and musician.

== Early life, family and education ==
DeYoung was born in Los Angeles, California. He is a 1968 graduate of California State University, Los Angeles.

== Career ==
Before his acting career, he was the lead singer of the 1960s rock group Clear Light, which played the same concerts with acts such as The Doors, Jimi Hendrix, and Janis Joplin. After the band dissolved, he starred in the Broadway production of Hair and the Tony Award-winning Sticks and Bones.

After four years in New York City, he moved back to California to star in the television film Sunshine (1973), and featuring the songs of John Denver. There was a short-lived television series based on the film. The song "My Sweet Lady" from the film reached No. 17 on the Billboard Hot 100 in 1974, No. 14 in Canada and No. 42 in Australia. Sunshine Christmas, a sequel, was produced in 1977.

Since then, DeYoung has appeared in more than 80 films and television series, including Harry and Tonto (1974), The Lindbergh Kidnapping Case (1976), Captains and the Kings (1976), The 3,000 Mile Chase (1977), Centennial (1978) as John Skimmerhorn, Blue Collar (1978) as an FBI agent, Shock Treatment (the 1981 sequel to The Rocky Horror Picture Show) in which he played twin characters who sang a duet with each other, Master of the Game (1984) as Brad Rogers, and Flight of the Navigator (1986) in which he played Bill, David's father.

Also in the 1980s, he made a guest appearance on Murder, She Wrote, like fellow Navigator actor Joey Cramer. In 1987, he guest-starred in the television show Beauty and the Beast as the specialist in voodoo Professor Alexander Ross. In the 1989 Civil War film Glory, he played Union Colonel James Montgomery. Other projects included the films Suicide Kings (1997) and Last Flight Out (2004).

He has guest-starred on Star Trek: Deep Space Nine (in the episode "Vortex"); as reporter Chuck DePalma in four episodes of JAG; Rep. Kimball in the episode "On the Day Before" on The West Wing; and as John Bonacheck, Amber Ashby's kidnapper, on The Young and the Restless in 2007.

In 2010, DeYoung appeared in Monte Hellman's independent romantic thriller Road to Nowhere.

In the 2014 film Wild, he played Ed, a summer resident of the Kennedy Meadows Campground on the Pacific Crest Trail.

== Filmography ==
=== Film ===
- Pilgrimage (1972) - Garry
- Harry and Tonto (1974) - Burt Jr.
- Blue Collar (1978) - John Burrows
- Shock Treatment (1981) - Brad Majors / Farley Flavors
- Independence Day (1983) - Les Morgan
- The Hunger (1983) - Tom Haver
- Reckless (1984) - Phil Barton
- Protocol (1984) - Hilley
- Secret Admirer (1985) - George Ryan
- F/X (1986) - FBI agent Martin Lipton
- Flight of the Navigator (1986) - Bill Freeman
- The Survivalist (1987) - Dr. Vincent Ryan
- Pulse (1988) - Bill
- Forbidden Sun (1988) - Professor Lake
- In Dangerous Company (1988) - Blake
- Fear (1988) - Don Haden
- Rude Awakening (1989) - Agent Brubaker
- Glory (1989) - Col. James M. Montgomery
- Flashback (1990) - Sheriff Hightower
- To Die Standing (1991) - Shaun Broderick
- Immortal Sins (1991) - Mike
- Crackdown (1991) - Shaun Broderick
- Dr. Giggles (1992) - Tom Campbell
- The Skateboard Kid (1993) - Big Dan
- Revenge of the Red Baron (1994) - Richard Spencer
- Terminal Voyage (1994) - Granier
- Carnosaur 2 (1995) - Maj. Tom McQuade
- The Substitute (1996) - Wolson
- The Craft (1996) - Mr. Bailey
- Andersonville (1996) - Sgt. John Gleason
- Suicide Kings (1997) - Marty
- Get a Clue (1997) - Jake Wexler
- Last Flight Out (2004) - Tony Williams
- Stone and Ed (2008) - Mr. Schwartz
- Solar Flare (2008) - Dr. Kline
- 2012: Doomsday (2008) - Lloyd
- Road to Nowhere (2010) - Cary Stewart / Rafe Taschen
- Wild (2014) - Ed
- Reality Queen! (2020) - Joe Logo

=== Television ===
- Sunshine (1973, TV Movie) - Sam Hayden
- The Night That Panicked America (1975, TV Movie) - Stefan Grubowski
- Centennial (1978-1979) - John Skimmerhorn
- Family (1979, Episode 6: "Whispers") - Alex Canfield
- King (1978, TV Miniseries) - Robert F. Kennedy
- Beauty and the Beast (1987, Episode 9: "Dark Spirit") - Alexander Ross
- The Twilight Zone (1986, Episode 31: "The Road Less Traveled") - Jeff McDowell
- Murder, She Wrote (1988-1992) - Mason Porter / Carlton Reid / Father Patrick Francis
- Young Riders (1990, Season 1, episode 16 "Unfinished Business") - Evan Crandall
- The Tommyknockers (1993, TV Mini-Series) - Joe Paulson
- Star Trek: Deep Space Nine (1993, Season 1 - Episode 12) - Croden
- The X-Files (1993, Episode 1: "Pilot") - Dr. Jay Nemman
- Heaven and Hell (North and the South book III, mini-series) 1994 - Gettys
- RoboCop: The Series (1994) - Dr. Cray Z. Mallardo
- Diagnosis: Murder (1995, Season 2, Episode 19 "How to Murder Your Lawyer") - Jeffrey T. Canfield
- Andersonville 1996 TV movie- Sgt. Gleason
- Deliberate Intent (2000, TV Movie) - Tom Kelly
- Alias (2005, Season 4, Episode 11 "The Road Home")
- Threshold (2005, Season 1, Episode 4 "The Burning") - Charlie Miller
- Grey's Anatomy (2008, Season 5, Episodes 1 & 2 "Dream a little dream of me" Parts 1 & 2) - Phil Loomis
- In Plain Sight (2009, Season 2, Episodes 6 "One Night Stan") - Chief Inspector Malone
