= Appian Way (disambiguation) =

The Appian Way was one of the earliest and strategically most important Roman roads of the ancient republic.

Appian Way may refer to:

- Appian Way, Burwood, a street located in Burwood in Sydney, New South Wales, Australia
- Appian Way Productions, a film production company in West Hollywood, California
- Appian Way Regional Park, a protected area in the Italian region of Latium
- "Appian Way", a song by Jeff Simmons from his 1969 album Lucille Has Messed My Mind Up
