= John Jay Moore =

American production designer, art director

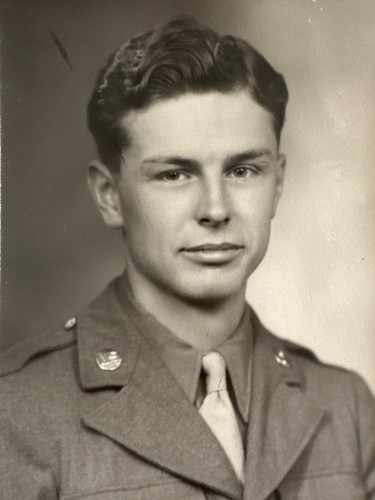
- Moore in c.1950
- Born: John Jay Moore III; February 22, 1928; Towanda, Pennsylvania, U.S.
- Died: May 7, 2018 (aged 90); Ventura, California, U.S.
- Occupations: Production designer, art director
- Spouses: Lorna Jane Hoblitzell (m. 1950; div. 1959); Karin Elisabeth Rasmussen (m. 1986; his death 2018)
- Children: 3

John Jay Moore III (February 22, 1928 – May 7, 2018) was an American production designer and art director for Broadway productions and later for films.

== Biography ==
Moore was born on February 22, 1928 in Towanda, Pennsylvania After serving in the United States Army during the Korean War, Moore studied theater at Syracuse University, receiving a B.S. and an M.A. in drama.

Moore began his career as a lighting and set designer on Broadway in 1967. He worked on many productions including Fiddler on The Roof, A Little Night Music, and Cabaret. He continued to work on Broadway shows until 1977.

He also worked as artistic director on television, including the 32nd annual Tony Awards.

In 1971, Moore transitioned from stage to film as an assistant art director on Klute and The Pursuit of Happiness. Additional film credits include Sophie's Choice (film) and Ghostbusters, Sea of Love Whispers in the Dark and Double Impact

Moore designed sets for the 1984 production of The King and I.

Moore died in 2018, in Ventura, California, at the age of 90.
