= Sunshine (1973 film) =

1973 television film by Joseph Sargent

- Australian official theatrical release poster
- Genre: Docudrama
- Based on: journal by Jacquelyn M. Helton
- Teleplay by: Carol Sobieski
- Directed by: Joseph Sargent
- Starring: Cristina Raines; Cliff DeYoung; Meg Foster; Brenda Vaccaro
- Theme music composer: John Denver; Hal Mooney
- Country of origin: United States
- Original language: English

Production
- Producer: George Eckstein
- Running time: 125 minutes
- Production company: Universal Television

Original release
- Network: CBS
- Release: November 9, 1973

Sunshine is a 1973 American made-for-television docudrama, directed by Joseph Sargent and produced by George Eckstein, about Kate Hayden, a young wife and mother who is diagnosed with cancer at age 20. The film stars Cristina Raines in the lead role of Kate (Raines' first big movie role), Cliff DeYoung as Kate's husband Sam Hayden, and twins Lindsay and Sidney Greenbush as Jill, Kate and Sam's daughter, as a toddler. It originally aired on CBS as an episode of the CBS Friday Night Movie on November 9, 1973. When first aired, Sunshine was the most watched made-for-TV film in history. The film uses John Denver's song "Sunshine on My Shoulders" as a theme. The song "My Sweet Lady" from the film reached #17 on the Billboard Hot 100 Pop Chart in 1974, and #14 in Canada.

== Plot ==
Young pregnant divorcee Kate falls in love with struggling musician Sam Hayden, and they become a couple, eventually getting married. A few months into Kate and Sam's relationship, Kate gives birth to a daughter they name Jill. Although Jill's biological father is Kate's former husband, David, Sam loves Jill and regards her as his own child.

Shortly after Jill is born, Kate gets the shocking news that she has an osteosarcoma, which is a bone cancer. Kate has two options to treat her cancer: she can either have her leg amputated and hope the cancer does not spread, or undergo chemotherapy. Unwilling to lose her leg, Kate initially has chemotherapy which makes her very ill and unable to function in her daily life or look after Jill. Kate then decides to forgo treatment entirely and concentrate on being a wife to Sam and a mother to Jill in the short time she has left, since not treating the cancer will hasten her death.

Kate agrees to take part in a medical research study by keeping a recorded journal in which she describes her feelings about being a young wife and mother facing death. After Kate has been journaling for some time, her tape recorder is stolen, causing her story to gain national attention. She receives a replacement tape recorder and continues her journal until she dies at the end of the film.

== Cast ==
- Cristina Raines as Kate Hayden
- Cliff DeYoung as Sam Hayden
- Meg Foster as Nora
- Brenda Vaccaro as Dr. Carol Gillman
- Bill Mumy as Weaver
- Alan Fudge as David
- Corey Fischer as Givits
- Lindsay and Sidney Greenbush as Jill Hayden
  - Sarah Valentini as Infant Jill Hayden
- James Hong as Dr. Wilde
- Bill Stout as Interviewer
- Noble Willingham as Bartender
- Adrian Ricard as Nurse

== Charts ==
The soundtrack was released by MCA in 1973.

| Chart (1973/75) | Position |
|---|---|
| Australia (Kent Music Report) | 16 |

== Production ==
=== Film origins ===
Sunshine was based on the life of Jacquelyn M. "Lyn" Helton (September 13, 1951 – November 7, 1971). In 1969, shortly after giving birth to her daughter Jennifer, the 18-year-old Helton was diagnosed with osteosarcoma, a form of bone cancer. Helton, along with her photographer/musician husband Tom Helton and her baby daughter, moved from Green River, Wyoming, to Denver, Colorado, to seek medical treatment. Helton began to record her thoughts about dying and leaving her husband and baby behind on audio tape and written journal with the goal of writing a book to help other dying people. In July 1971, Helton's tape recorder was stolen. The local news story of the theft and her journal project was picked up by television networks as a human interest story and run in national news coverage. She was gifted with a replacement tape recorder and continued her project.

Helton died on November 7, 1971, at the age of 20. After her death, numerous newspapers and magazines published excerpts from her journal. Lawrence Schiller, then a promoter, acquired the television and film rights to Helton's life story which became the basis for the film Sunshine and a short lived TV series. The opening credits of Sunshine state that the film was "suggested by" Helton's journal, while a voice-over announces that in 1971, a 20-year-old wife and mother died, leaving behind a tape recorded journal about being "young, and a mother, and in love, and dying" and that although names have been changed, the film "retained her spirit, and many of the words from her tapes."

Some critics also viewed Helton's story as having inspired a second made-for-TV movie, Message To My Daughter starring Bonnie Bedelia and Martin Sheen, which was first aired on December 12, 1973, on ABC. In Message, Janet Thatcher (Bedelia), the dying mother of a baby girl makes tape recordings of advice which her daughter Miranda (Kitty Winn) receives many years after Janet's death. However, the film's writer and director denied that Message was inspired by Helton, and said that the script was written before Sunshine.

=== Filming locations ===
Parts of the film were shot on location in Vancouver, British Columbia with neighborhood scenes in Kitsilano and the West End, including footage of the Burrard and Granville Street Bridges and North Shore Mountains.

== Sequels ==
The short-lived 1975 NBC television series Sunshine picked up the story of Sam Hayden struggling to raise Jill alone after Kate's death. DeYoung, Mumy, Fischer and Foster all appeared in the TV series reprising their movie roles, while Elizabeth Cheshire played the slightly older Jill Hayden. The series was cancelled after 13 episodes.

A 1977 made-for-TV Christmas movie, Sunshine Christmas, further continued the story, focusing on Sam and Jill's Christmas visit to Sam's parents, Joe and Bertha (Pat Hingle and Eileen Heckart, respectively) in Texas, where Sam rekindles a romance with his childhood sweetheart, Cody Blanks (Barbara Hershey). It first aired on NBC on December 12, 1977.

== Book adaptation ==
A novelization of the film Sunshine was written by Norma Klein and published in October 1975. Klein later wrote novelizations of the Sunshine TV series (published under the title The Sunshine Years) and Sunshine Christmas.

== Home media ==
Redwind Productions licensed Sunshine for its first home video release in 2018. They went back to the original film negative to create a 4K DPX scan, fully restoring the film to its original aspect ratio for release on their Signature Series Blu-Ray release, available at both Screen Archives Entertainment and Twilight Time Movies.
