= Fire and Rain =

Fire and Rain may refer to:

- "Fire and Rain" (song), a 1970 song by James Taylor
- Fire and Rain (film), a 1989 film directed by Jerry J. Jameson
- Fire and Rain (novel), a 1964 Taiwanese novel by Chiung Yao

== See also ==
- "Rain and Fire", a 2017 song by Sara Evans from the album Words
- Rain and Fire, a book in the series The Last Dragon Chronicles
