= Fear (1996 film) =

1996 film by James Foley

- Theatrical release poster
- Directed by: James Foley
- Written by: Christopher Crowe
- Produced by: Brian Grazer; Ric Kidney
- Starring: Mark Wahlberg; Reese Witherspoon; William Petersen; Alyssa Milano; Amy Brenneman
- Cinematography: Thomas Kloss
- Edited by: David Brenner
- Music by: Carter Burwell
- Production company: Imagine Entertainment
- Distributed by: Universal Pictures
- Release date: April 12, 1996
- Running time: 96 minutes
- Country: United States
- Language: English
- Budget: $6.5 million
- Box office: $20.8 million

Fear is a 1996 American psychological thriller film directed by James Foley and written by Christopher Crowe. It stars Mark Wahlberg, Reese Witherspoon, William Petersen, Alyssa Milano and Amy Brenneman. The film revolves around the wealthy Walker family whose seemingly perfect life is threatened when teenage daughter Nicole begins dating David McCall, an attractive and mysterious young man who turns out to be a violent sociopath.

Fear was released by Universal Pictures on April 12, 1996. The film was largely derided by critics upon its release but became a sleeper hit in the spring of 1996, grossing $20.8 million at the U.S. box office against a $6.5 million budget. It has since become a cult film, while at the same time launching teen idol status for its two young leads – Wahlberg and Witherspoon – who were romantically linked at the time of the movie's premiere. Wahlberg was nominated for the MTV Movie Award for Best Villain at the 1997 MTV Movie Awards. The film's own producer, Brian Grazer, described it as "Fatal Attraction for teens".

== Plot ==
Sixteen-year-old Nicole Walker lives in the suburbs of Seattle with her father, Steve, his new wife, Laura, and Laura's son, Toby. While she is at a café with her best friend, Margo Masse, and their friend, Gary Rohmer, Nicole meets David McCall and instantly becomes smitten with him.

Steve dislikes David and grows angry with him when he disregards Nicole's curfew and later takes her virginity. David soon becomes possessive and jealous of Nicole, culminating in attacking Gary when he sees them hugging, beating him up, and giving Nicole a black eye. As a result, she breaks up with him, but they get back together after David apologizes for his actions.

After a weekend visit to their house, Steve does a background check on David, discovering the young man was a troubled ward of the state and has no history, employment or otherwise, since he was kicked out of an institution at 18. Steve confronts David and orders him to stay away from Nicole, but after Steve departs, an unhinged David beats his own chest and manipulates Nicole into believing Steve assaulted him.

David invites Nicole to a party at his friend Logan's house. At first, she declines but then decides to drive to the party, where she witnesses Margo smoking crack and apparently going off to have sex with David, although Margo is actually sexually assaulted.

The following day, Nicole confronts David about his infidelity and breaks up with him for good. She also confronts Margo, refusing to believe that David sexually assaulted her. He then threatens Margo to get her to convince her friend to take him back. After seeing Gary help Nicole into Laura's car, David follows and kills him.

Nicole goes with Laura and Toby to the mall, where David corners her in the women's restroom, vowing that he will not let anyone stand in the way of him having Nicole to himself. Meanwhile, Steve finds his car vandalized with an insulting note left by David. Furious, Steve breaks into the house David shares with Logan and vandalizes it after discovering a shrine David made for Nicole. In retaliation for the vandalism, David heads to the Walkers' residence with his four friends: Logan, Terry, Knobby, and Hacker, intending to harm the Walkers and abduct Nicole.

After Margo informs the Walkers of Gary's death, David and his gang arrive and behead Kaiser, the family dog, then make multiple attempts to break inside. Steve and Laura barricade the doors, and Laura injures Hacker with a drill, leading Knobby to take him to the hospital. Using a flashlight, Nicole sends an SOS to the Walkers' private security guard, Larry O'Brien, who arrives to investigate but is killed by Terry.

David, Logan, and Terry take Steve hostage, forcing Laura to surrender, and the two are bound and gagged in the living room with handcuffs and duct tape. Toby escapes through a window and gets to Laura's car phone to call 911. After Terry finds him in the garage, Toby fatally runs him over with the Jeep. Logan forces himself onto Nicole; Margo arrives and intervenes, but is knocked unconscious.

David shoots Logan dead for attempting to rape Nicole and then tells her that he intends to kill Steve so he can finally have her, believing that Nicole will forgive and accept him. After Toby retrieves Larry's keys and releases his parents, Steve rushes at David. However, David overpowers him and prepares to kill him, until Nicole saves Steve by stabbing David with a peace pipe (a gift from David himself).

As a hurt David looks at Nicole in shock, Steve gets back up and brawls with him. Steve prevents an enraged David from attacking Nicole and eventually grabs David from behind and throws him out the bedroom window. David lands head first on the rocks outside the house, dying instantly. The family embraces as the police arrive.

== Cast ==
- Mark Wahlberg as David McCall
- Reese Witherspoon as Nicole Walker
- William Petersen as Steve Walker
- Alyssa Milano as Margo Masse
- Amy Brenneman as Laura Walker
- Tracy Fraim as Logan
- Jason Kristofer as Terry
- Jed Rees as Knobby
- Gary John Riley as Hacker
- Todd Caldecott as Gary Rohmer
- David Fredericks as Larry O'Brien
- Christopher Gray as Toby
- Gerry Bean (credited as John Oliver) as Eddie Clark
- Andrew Airlie as Alex McDowell

== Production ==
Producer Brian Grazer had come up with the idea for the film while on a skiing trip with his daughter, and in 1993, Christopher Crowe was hired to pen the script, initially under the title No Fear for Imagine Entertainment. In March 1994, it was announced that James Foley was in negotiations to direct the project.

Leonardo DiCaprio was looked at for the role of David McCall (surnamed McNeil prior to production), but DiCaprio did not think he was right for the part. Instead, he put in a good word for Mark Wahlberg (with whom he co-starred on The Basketball Diaries) to director James Foley.

The movie was filmed for 11 weeks in the Pacific Northwest. While the story was set in Seattle, Washington, the filmmakers actually spent three days there to establish the city before moving production to Vancouver, British Columbia, where the filmmakers found the site for the Walker family house on Howe Sound.

In a July 2023 interview, Reese Witherspoon said she requested a stunt double for the sex scene during the roller coaster sequence, saying:

"I didn't have control over it. It wasn't explicit in the script that that's what was going to happen, so that was something that I think the director thought of on his own and then asked me on set if I would do it, and I said, 'No.' It wasn't a particularly great experience."

== Release ==
Fear was released on April 12, 1996, in 1,584 theaters. It opened at number four at the box office, making $6.3 million in its opening weekend. By the end of its run, the film earned $20.8 million in the US.

== Soundtrack ==
1. "Jessica" by The Allman Brothers Band
2. "Green Mind" by Dink
3. "Comedown" by Bush
4. "Wild Horses" by The Sundays
5. "Machinehead" by Bush
6. "Something's Always Wrong" by Toad the Wet Sprocket
7. "Animal" by Prick
8. "Stars and Stripes Forever" by C.H.S Municipal Band
9. "The Illist" by Marky Mark
10. "Irie Vibe" by One Love

== Reception ==
Fear holds a 46% approval rating on Rotten Tomatoes based on 39 reviews, with an average rating of 5.20/10. The site's consensus reads: "Fear has an appealing young cast, but their efforts aren't enough to consistently distract from an increasingly overblown – and illogical – teen stalker story". On Metacritic it has a score of 51% based on reviews from 16 critics, indicating "mixed or average" reviews. Audiences polled by CinemaScore gave the film an average grade of "B" on an A+ to F scale.

Mick LaSalle of the San Francisco Chronicle said, "Fear is hard to resist. On one hand, it's a shameless thriller that makes up for the inevitability of its story by consistently being bigger, faster, and more appalling than you might expect. On the other hand, it contains enough truth about fathers, teenage daughters, and young lust to distinguish it from most thrillers and ground it in vivid emotion. It is a nightmare fantasy for fathers. Director James Foley and screenwriter Christopher Crowe keep raising the stakes all the way to a finish that's something out of The Straw Dogs. It's a maddening, satisfying, junky, enjoyable picture."

Owen Gleiberman of Entertainment Weekly gave the film a positive review, further accrediting the comparisons to Fatal Attraction. According to him, "Fear is a teen Fatal Attraction, with Mark Wahlberg and Reese Witherspoon in the Glenn Close and (respectively) Michael Douglas roles, and with William Petersen in Anne Archer's. And – surprise – it isn't bad." He did, however, criticize the finale: "[Director] James Foley does a fine job evoking the sexual tensions between father, daughter, and rogue suitor. Yet he has less luck with the (inevitable) garish climax, which is unconvincingly staged... never even making it over the top".

Gene Siskel gave the film a thumbs-down while Roger Ebert gave it a thumbs-up. Siskel called the picture "Predictable trash with an 'inspired' title, and with a third act which nosedives into pure mayhem... It's shocking that such a film was made by the same director who gave us At Close Range, Glengary Glen Ross and After Dark, My Sweet; this one is not worthy of his talent. It should have been titled Who's That Boy." Ebert claimed the movie "generates genuine psychological interest, with an effective and suspenseful portrait of a family under siege."

Movie historian Leonard Maltin gave the picture two out of four stars: "This passable slasher epic benefits from taut, stylish direction and from decent performances; still, it's awfully derivative – especially the climactic showdown. Mark Wahlberg is menacing as the lovestruck hood, but he could benefit from diction lessons."

Critical revaluation of the film has proved more positive than its initial reception, with Carter Burwell's score being especially well received. One critic has since stated that "although dismissed by some reviewers upon its release as a sensationalist, hysterical, formulaic piece, Fear has improved with age". The film was placed as No. 19 on Bravo TV's 30 Even Scarier Movie Moments.

== Adaptations ==
On May 23, 2019, it was announced that Universal Pictures and Imagine Entertainment would produce a remake of the film with Brian Grazer again producing, along with Karen Lunder as co-producer. Jonathan Herman was reported to adapt Crowe's script for a modern audience and Amandla Stenberg was in talks to star.

In October 2022, it was reported that a television series adaptation of the film is in development at Peacock.

== See also ==
- List of films featuring home invasions
