= Crime and Punishment (1998 film) =

- Genre: Drama
- Based on: Crime and Punishment by Fyodor Dostoevsky
- Written by: David Stevens
- Directed by: Joseph Sargent
- Starring: Patrick Dempsey; Julie Delpy; Ben Kingsley
- Music by: Stanislas Syrewicz
- Country of origin: United States
- Original language: English

Production
- Executive producer: Robert Halmi
- Producers: Howard Ellis; Joseph Sargent
- Production location: Budapest
- Cinematography: Elemér Ragályi
- Editor: Ian Farr
- Running time: 120 minutes
- Production companies: Hallmark Entertainment; NBC Studios

Original release
- Network: NBC
- Release: October 11, 1998

Crime and Punishment is a 1998 American made-for-television drama film directed by Joseph Sargent and based on the 1866 novel by Fyodor Dostoyevsky. It stars Patrick Dempsey and Ben Kingsley.

== Plot ==
A man is haunted by a murder he committed.

== Cast ==
- Patrick Dempsey as Rodya Raskolnikov
- Ben Kingsley as Porfiry Petrovich
- Julie Delpy as Sonia Marmeladova
- Eddie Marsan as Dimitri Prokofyich
- Lili Horváth as Dounia Raskolnikova
- Richard Bremmer as Arkady Ivanovich
- Penny Downie as Katerina Marmeladova
- Maria Charles as Alena Ivanova
- Zoltán Gera as Praskovya Zarnitsyna

== Production ==
Filming took place in Budapest, Hungary.

== Release ==
=== Home media ===
The film was recut from 120 to 87 minutes in some European DVD releases (France, Spain).
