= Melinda's World =

2003 film

Melinda's World is a 2003 film adaptation of Marianne Kennedy's novel, directed by David Baumgarten and is also Zac Efron's film debut.

== Plot ==
Set in the American Midwest of the 1950s, Melinda (Jenifer Olivares), the eleven-year-old daughter of sour parents (Cristina Raines and Thomas Michael Kappler), finds interest in small things: a spun silver spiderweb, her box of treasures, and an afternoon at Silver Lake on her "day of days". Melinda's often known as a "silly goose" by her best friend, Alice Wasser (Jennifer McClusky). As the movie progresses, Melinda experiences ageless comforts and pains. Eliot Bradley (Chad Stevens), a waylaid college professor enters her life along with a warmhearted waitress (Ruth de Sosa), who introduces Melinda to the blues and Coca-Cola. She receives her first explorative attention from a teasing boy named Stuart Wasser (Zac Efron). Escalating tragedy, the death of her beloved Aunt Calla (Mary McKowen), is climaxed by her father's eruption into angry drunkenness, shattering Melinda's innocence forever and sending her fleeing into the night. The ultimate triumph of Melinda's spirit culminates when at year's end she once again visits her treasure box with bittersweet memories.
