= B.L. Stryker =

American detective TV series (1989-1990)

- Genre: Detective drama
- Created by: Christopher Crowe
- Starring: Burt Reynolds; Ossie Davis; Rita Moreno; Dana Kaminski
- Country of origin: United States
- Original language: English
- No. of seasons: 2
- No. of episodes: 12

Production
- Executive producers: Tom Selleck; Burt Reynolds
- Running time: 95–120 minutes
- Production companies: Blue Period Productions, Inc.; T.W.S. Productions, Inc.; Universal Television

Original release
- Network: ABC
- Release: February 13, 1989 – May 5, 1990

B.L. Stryker is an American detective drama that aired on ABC from February 13, 1989, to May 5, 1990, as part of the ABC Mystery Movie umbrella group, along with Columbo, Gideon Oliver, and Kojak. Tom Selleck was one of the series' executive producers. The series starred Burt Reynolds, Ossie Davis, Dana Kaminski and Rita Moreno. Reynolds also directed several of the episodes. Each B.L. Stryker episode was two hours long, and took approximately a month to film. The first season of B.L. Stryker was seven two-hour episodes that aired every three weeks, broadcast on Monday nights from 9 p.m. to 11 p.m., on ABC. In the second season, the show was aired on Saturday nights.

== Premise ==
Reynolds portrays Buddy Lee Stryker, aka B.L., a Vietnam War vet and retired New Orleans police officer who has moved back home to the other side of the tracks in Palm Beach, Florida, and is working as a private investigator. Stryker lives on a houseboat and drives an old Cadillac, and occasionally scrapes up a client while trying to avoid being relocated for not paying his slip fees.

== Cast ==
- Burt Reynolds as B.L. Stryker
- Ossie Davis as Oz Jackson, Stryker's best friend and a former boxer
- Rita Moreno as Kimberly Baskin, Stryker's ex-wife (6 episodes)
- Dana Kaminski, as Lyynda Lennox, Stryker's assistant (11 episodes)
- Michael O. Smith as Chief McGee
- Alfie Wise as Oliver Wardell, diminutive owner of the marina at which Stryker's boat is moored, and frequently Stryker's comic foil
- James C. Lewis as Captain Cartrude, Palm Beach police (10 episodes)

== Production ==
Reynolds decided to return to television after appearing in a number of unsuccessful movies. The deal came together very fast; ABC approached Reynolds and he agreed to make it in two days. Reynolds says he was attracted by the fact the series gave him six months off and considerable creative control, and it would be shot in Florida where he lived.

== Episodes ==
=== Season 1 (1989) ===
No.	Title	Written by	Original release date
1	"The Dancer’s Touch"	Leon Piedmont, Walter Klenhard, Chris Abbott	February 13, 1989
A serial rapist that Stryker put away in New Orleans is at it again in Palm Beach, and he’s targeting Stryker’s young friend (Kristy Swanson).
2	"Carolann"	Hall Powell, Jay Huguely	March 6, 1989
Stryker protects a Middle Eastern queen (Deborah Raffin) whose husband has been assassinated.
3	"Blind Chess"	Joe Gores	March 27, 1989
Stryker’s secretary, Lyynda (Dana Kaminski) enlists his aid for her brother (Austin Pendleton), an accountant who wants to get himself and his girlfriend out of prison.
4	"Auntie Sue"	Tim Burns	April 17, 1989
Stryker’s kooky Aunt Sue (Maureen Stapleton) wants to buy a house for herself and her friends (including Jack Gilford), but she’s mixed up with the wrong people to get the money.
5	"Blues for Buder"	Joan H. Parker, Robert B. Parker	May 15, 1989
Stryker acts as bodyguard for a young religious zealot (Neil Patrick Harris) who makes enemies by sermonizing everywhere he goes. Burt Reynolds also directed this episode.

=== Season 2 (1989–90) ===
No. overall	No. in season	Title	Directed by	Written by	Original release date
6	1	"The King of Jazz"	Hal Needham	Walter Klenhard	November 18, 1989
Stryker enlists an old buddy with the FBI (Ned Beatty) to help investigate a cheating husband whose girlfriend may be up to more than just an affair. This episode was directed by Hal Needham, who also directed Reynolds in multiple major motion picture releases, including Smokey and the Bandit, Hooper, and The Cannonball Run.
7	2	"Die Laughing"	Burt Reynolds	Chris Abbott & Norma Jean Wood	December 16, 1989
Stryker is hired to protect a comedian (Dom DeLuise) whose life is in danger, while also trying to find a new slip for his houseboat. Burt Reynolds also directed this episode.
8	3	"Winner Takes All"	Alan J. Levi	Tommy Thompson	January 13, 1990
The father of a big-time high school football prospect dies in a car crash, and Stryker and an old football buddy (Paul Gleason) investigate at the request of the prospect’s grandmother (Cicely Tyson).
9	4	"Grand Theft Hotel"	Tony Wharmby	Tim Burns	February 24, 1990
Stryker is hired to act as head of security at a posh Bahamas resort for a weekend, and becomes involved with a beautiful lady (Loni Anderson) and the murder of his ex-wife’s (Rita Moreno) wealthy friend.
10	5	"High Rise"	Nick McLean	Joan H. Parker & Robert P. Parker	March 10, 1990
On Stryker’s birthday, his ex-wife (Rita Moreno) and best friend (Ossie Davis) are held captive by a bank robber (Ricardo Montalbán). Episode also features Julianne Moore.
11	6	"Plates"	Stuart Margolin	Neil Cohen	April 14, 1990
A simple trip to the DMV turns into a nightmare as Stryker encounters a parade of strange and dangerous characters. Co-stars Carol Alt. This episode was directed by Stuart Margolin, well known for his role as Angel on The Rockford Files.
12	7	"Night Train"	Burt Reynolds	Jack B. Sowards	May 5, 1990
Stryker escorts a young female murder witness (Lindsey Alley) on a train trip to Washington DC, but assassins are after them. Burt Reynolds also directed this episode.

== Home media ==
The complete 12-episode series was released on Region 1 DVD from Arts Alliance America in a 7-disc set.
