= Nightmares (1983 film) =

1983 film directed by Joseph Sargent

- Theatrical poster designed by Design Projects, Inc.
- Directed by: Joseph Sargent
- Written by: Jeffrey Bloom; Christopher Crowe
- Produced by: Christopher Crowe
- Starring: Emilio Estevez; Cristina Raines; Lance Henriksen; Richard Masur; Veronica Cartwright
- Cinematography: Mario DeLeo; Gerald Perry Kinnerman
- Edited by: Michael Brown; Rod Stephens
- Music by: Craig Safan
- Production company: Universal Pictures
- Distributed by: Universal Pictures
- Release date: September 9, 1983
- Running time: 99 minutes
- Country: United States
- Language: English
- Budget: $6 million
- Box office: $6.7 million

Nightmares is a 1983 American horror anthology film directed by Joseph Sargent and starring Emilio Estevez, Lance Henriksen, Cristina Raines, Veronica Cartwright and Richard Masur. The film is made up of four short films based on urban legends; the first concerns Lisa, a woman who encounters William Henry Glazier, a killer in the backseat of her car; the second concerns J.J. Cooney, a video game-addicted teenager who is consumed by his game; the third focuses on Frank MacLeod, a fallen priest who is stalked by a pickup truck from hell; and the last follows the suburban Houston family battling a giant rat in their home.

Nightmares was originally filmed as a two-hour pilot of a proposed television series to be broadcast by the NBC network during the 1983–1984 TV season.

== Plot ==
=== Terror in Topanga ===
During a routine traffic stop, a highway patrolman is viciously stabbed by an unseen assailant, though he survives and is taken to the hospital. The perpetrator is William Henry Glazier, a serial killer who escaped a mental institution and is currently terrorizing the Topanga area.

Meanwhile, Lisa, a housewife and chain smoker, discovers that she is out of cigarettes and goes out to buy some more, despite her husband Phillip warning her not to. Lisa reaches the store and buys groceries and cigarettes. On the drive home, Lisa discovers that she is nearly out of gas, and with all the local gas stations already closed for the night, she stops at an out-of-the-way station. The attendant happens to perfectly match Glazier's physical appearance. Lisa grows increasingly alarmed as the attendant seems to be studying her and her car intently. Suddenly, the attendant lunges at the car with a gas nozzle, breaking the window. He drags Lisa out of the car, then draws a pistol and shoots the actual Glazier, who had been hiding in Lisa's back seat. The attendant calms Lisa and offers to call the police.

The police drive the frightened Lisa back home, where she throws the cigarettes in the trash.

=== The Bishop of Battle ===
J.J. Cooney is an immensely talented video game player and hustler who is obsessed with beating The Bishop of Battle, a notoriously difficult video game where players fight off enemies and escape from a 3-D maze that features thirteen different levels. J.J.'s friend Zock Maxwell mentions how no one they know has ever made it to the thirteenth level, to the point that many people believe it is just a myth. J.J., however, is convinced that the thirteenth level is real and spends the next several hours repeatedly trying and failing to make it there, but he only gets as far as level 12. Determined not to give up, even after closing time, J.J. tries to play one more game, only for the owner of the arcade to throw him out.

That night, J.J. sneaks out of home when his parents Jerry and Adele are asleep and breaks into the arcade to attempt to finish the game. Despite the great difficulty, J.J finally manages to complete level 12. Suddenly, the arcade cabinet falls apart, and The Bishop of Battle's voice rings out, commending J.J. for his skills and welcoming him to level 13, before the cabinet releases a wave of energy. Once the wave passes, the game's 3-D enemies fly out of the cabinet's wreckage and into the real world. The enemies fire lasers that damage the surrounding area, but J.J. manages to defend himself with the gun from the game's controls, which also fires real laser blasts. He flees to the parking lot but drops the gun in the process. The Bishop of Battle soon appears, drawing closer and closer to a terrified J.J.

The next morning, Zock, Jerry and Adele head to the arcade. They discover the damage the arcade sustained during the previous night, as well as The Bishop of Battle cabinet, which has been mysteriously reconstructed. Zock, Jerry and Adele then see J.J. on the screen, watching in disbelief as he turns into the sprite of the player character.

=== The Benediction ===
Catholic priest Father Frank MacLeod has lost his faith in God. Though he officiates the funeral of a young boy who was shot in a store robbery, he is unable to provide the mourners with words of comfort. Visiting his bishop, Frank explains how he witnessed the boy's death first-hand, and how the experience has convinced him that there is no God who would allow such suffering. Ignoring the advice of fellow priest Father Luis Del Amo, Frank resigns and leaves the rectory with some holy water, intending to search for a new purpose in life.

Frank soon encounters a black Chevrolet C-20 Fleetside with tinted windows on the road and signals for it to pass, but it goes at the same time he does, nearly causing an accident. A while later, the truck appears behind Frank and rams into his car, detaching his rear bumper and forcing him off the road. As Frank attempts to fix the bumper, the truck appears again, nearly running him over. Frank attempts to escape, but the truck catches up with him. Frank desperately asks the unseen driver what it wants before once again being forced off the road. As Frank gets back on the road, the truck explodes out of the ground and once again pursues him. It is revealed that the truck is driven by Satan himself. The Devil destroys Frank's car in a collision that does no damage to his truck. Injured from the crash and left with nowhere to run, a desperate Frank tosses his container of holy water at the truck, vaporizing it, before he falls unconscious. Emergency responders arrive at the scene but do not find evidence that the truck was ever there. As the paramedics tend to Frank, he requests that they take him to the hospital in his parish, having regained his faith from the experience.

=== Night of the Rat ===
On a stormy night, housewife Claire Houston hears something scurrying in the attic of her house and believes it is rats. The next morning, she browses the phone book to look for an exterminator despite her husband Steven's hesitancy. Later that night, a rat is killed by one of the traps Claire set, and Steven throws it in the garbage. Meanwhile, the family's cat Rosie investigates the house's crawlspace, where she is mauled to death by an unseen creature. The next day, Claire's daughter Brooke discovers that Rosie is missing. At the same time, the kitchen sink is revealed to be clogged with a large amount of grey fur. Claire enters the crawlspace to look for Rosie but finds the cat's corpse and glimpses the silhouette of a large creature with glowing red eyes. Later that day, Brooke discovers that her room and her toys have been torn to shreds, with the only toy left untouched being a stuffed rat.

Eventually, Claire calls exterminator Mel Keefer, who discovers that the creature has managed to gnaw through the pipes and the power cables. Keefer also discovers a large, saliva-covered hole behind a cabinet in the kitchen. Unhappy that Claire has hired Keefer, Steven asks him to leave. That night, as Brooke sleeps in the guest room, Claire receives a phone call from Keefer, who has made a breakthrough: An old book he owns contains information about a legendary creature known as "The Devil Rodent," a huge, malevolent rat with great strength and intellect that used to terrorize 17th-century Europe. Steven grabs the phone and tells Keefer not to call again. Suddenly, the family hear the piano downstairs playing jumbled notes, discovering that the keys have been gnawed on, and a china cabinet fallen over. Discovering more holes in the wall, Steven loads a shotgun and goes in search of the creature as Claire and Brooke hide upstairs.

The door to the guest room slams shut as Brooke begins screaming. Kicking the door open, Steven and Claire come face to face with the Devil Rodent itself. The giant rat demonstrates psychokinetic abilities, moving furniture, opening and closing doors and windows, and damaging the room repeatedly with a loud wail. The Devil Rodent manages to telepathically communicate with Brooke, who tells her parents that the creature is a mother who only wants her baby back. Steven rushes into the kitchen, roots through the garbage can, and pulls out the dead rat, placing it in a shoebox and putting it near the window. The Devil Rodent takes the box, reclaims her baby, and disappears out the window.

== Cast ==
Terror in Topanga
- Cristina Raines as Lisa
- Joe Lambie as Phillip
- Anthony James as Store Clerk
- William Sanderson as Gas Station Attendant
- Lee Ving as William Henry Glazier
- Clare Nono as Mori

The Bishop of Battle

- Emilio Estevez as J.J. Cooney
- Louis Giambalvo as Jerry Cooney
- Mariclare Costello as Adele Cooney
- Moon Unit Zappa as Pamela
- Billy Jayne as Zock Maxwell
- James Tolkan as The Bishop of Battle (voice)

The Benediction

- Lance Henriksen as Father Frank MacLeod
- Tony Plana as Father Luis Del Amo
- Timothy Scott as Sheriff
- Robin Gammell as Bishop
- Rose Mary Campos as Mother

Night of the Rat

- Richard Masur as Steven Houston
- Veronica Cartwright as Claire Houston
- Bridgette Andersen as Brooke Houston
- Albert Hague as Mel Keefer

== Production ==
Nightmares was initially filmed in late 1982 as a two-hour pilot for a proposed series to be aired by NBC during its 1983-84 television season, but Universal Pictures executives decided to put it out as a theatrical film instead. It has been a long-held belief that the four segments of the film were initially conceived and shot for ABC's thriller anthology series Darkroom, but were deemed too intense for television.

== Release ==
Universal Pictures released Nightmares theatrically in the United States on September 9, 1983.

=== Home media ===
The film was released on VHS by Universal Pictures Home Entertainment in the 1980s, and on Betamax in 1983. It was later released on VHS and DVD by Anchor Bay Entertainment in 1999 in a full frame (1.33:1) presentation and has since gone out of print.

On December 22, 2015, Scream Factory released Nightmares on Blu-ray.

== Reception ==
=== Box office ===
Nightmares opened in the United States across 1,250 theaters, earning $2,572,750 and ranking number three at the box office that weekend. The film ultimately grossed a total of $6,670,680.

=== Critical response ===
The film was not well received on release. On the review aggregator website Rotten Tomatoes, 29% of 7 critics' reviews are positive. Metacritic, which uses a weighted average, assigned the film a score of 39 out of 100, based on 5 critics, indicating "generally unfavorable" reviews.

In her review for The New York Times, Janet Maslin wrote, "Nothing spoils a horror story faster than a stupid victim. And Nightmares, an anthology of four supposedly scary episodes, has plenty of those." Time Out praised The Bishop of Battle segment, but stated, "In general, though, the scripting is unimaginative, derivative, and desperately predictable as the film limps through its jokily cautionary tales."

In a retrospective assessment, critic John Kenneth Muir praised the film as "an unexpectedly scary horror anthology, one that flew under the critical radar when released in 1983."

== See also ==
- Body Bags, a 1993 horror anthology that also was produced for television, and also had major filmmakers attached (John Carpenter and Tobe Hooper)
- Creepshow, a series of anthology horror films helmed by Stephen King and George A. Romero

== Sources ==
- Muir, John Kenneth (2010). Horror Films of the 1980s. Jefferson, North Carolina: McFarland & Company. ISBN 978-0-786-45501-0.
- Muir, John Kenneth (2013). Horror Films FAQ: All That's Left to Know About Slashers, Vampires, Zombies, Aliens, and More. Applause Books. ISBN 978-1-557-83950-3.
