= Todd Caldecott =

Canadian actor, writer, and health practitioner

- Born: New Westminster, British Columbia, Canada
- Occupations: Actor, Author, Medical Herbalist
- Years active: 1987–1996 (actor); 1993–present (author, medical herbalist)

Todd Caldecott is a Canadian clinical herbalist, Ayurvedic practitioner in Vancouver, British Columbia, author of the textbook Ayurveda: The Divine Science of Life (2006) and Food As Medicine: The Theory and Practice of Food (2011), and co-editor of Ayurveda In Nepal: The Teachings of Vaidya Mana Bajra Bajracharya (2011). He is also a former film and television actor.

== Life and career ==
Caldecott was born in New Westminster, British Columbia, and graduated from University Hill Secondary School in Vancouver in 1987. That same year, he won best actor in a Vancouver Theatre Festival for his performance in a play by Sheldon Rosen called The Box. Shortly thereafter Caldecott, also known as Todd Shaffer, obtained an agent, and began working in the film and television industry, guest-starring in several television shows including Wiseguy, 21 Jump Street, Danger Bay, Northwood and Bordertown. He also acted in a number of made-for-TV movies including Mother May I Sleep With Danger and One Boy, One Wolf, One Summer, and the feature films Fear and Friday the 13th Part VIII: Jason Takes Manhattan.

After becoming disillusioned with the film industry, Caldecott traveled to India and West Asia in 1990 for a year-long trip on a budget of only a "few dollars a day". During this year he studied Indian classical music in Chennai and Varanasi, India; and buddhist meditation in Bodhgaya, India; and Nilambe, Sri Lanka. During his travel and study he became very ill, at one point suffering from both bacillary and amoebic dysentery. After leaving India he traveled in a weakened state to the Northern Area of Pakistan, including Gilgit, the Hunza valley and Pasu. It was in these areas, renowned for their long-lived inhabitants, healthy food and glacial water that he "partially recovered" from his illness. He then went on to travel throughout Iran, spending several weeks as the guest of a Sufi master in Shiraz.

Returning to Canada, Caldecott sought relief from what now had become a chronic digestive disorder, and found success in the treatments of an Ayurvedic physician. This would prove to have an enormous influence on his life path, and shortly thereafter Caldecott enrolled and graduated from a three-year, full-time clinical program in Western Herbal Medicine at the Coastal Mountain College in Vancouver. After graduating, Caldecott immediately traveled back to India to study Ayurvedic medicine in Coimbatore, India, over a five-month period, and then returned to Canada to begin practicing, writing and teaching. In 1999, Caldecott relocated to Calgary, Alberta, where he eventually became clinical director of the Wild Rose College of Natural Healing. Here Caldecott developed, administered and taught a three-year clinical program in Western Herbal Medicine. During this time Caldecott completed the manuscript for a textbook called Ayurveda: The Divine Science of Life (ISBN 9780723434108), which was subsequently published by Elsevier in 2006.

Caldecott is co-editor of Ayurveda in Nepal: The Teachings of Vaidya Mana Bajra Bajracharya (ISBN 9781600475023), along with Madhu Bajra Bajracharya and Alan Tillotson. Published in 2009, this book summarizes the clinical practice of Ayurveda according to the late Vaidya Mana's hereditary tradition of Ayurvedic physicians and Buddhist priests in the Kathmandu Valley. Todd Caldecott is also author of Food As Medicine: The Theory and Practice of Food (2011), which describes the preventative and therapeutic application of food and dietary therapy, drawing upon the traditions of Ayurveda, Chinese medicine, and other traditional systems of healing. In 2012, Todd Caldecott founded the Dogwood School of Botanical Medicine, which offers distance learning programs and a gurukula-style, mentorship training program for aspiring practitioners. Todd Caldecott also maintains an extensive website containing free content on natural health and wellness including a blog where he regularly posts.
