= Manions of America =

- Created by: Agnes Nixon
- Screenplay by: Rosemary Anne Sisson
- Story by: Agnes Nixon and Rosemary Anne Sisson
- Directed by: Joseph Sargent; Charles S. Dubin
- Starring: Pierce Brosnan; Kate Mulgrew; Steve Forrest
- Composer: Morton Stevens
- Country of origin: United States
- Original language: English
- No. of episodes: 3

Production
- Executive producers: Roger Gimbel; Tony Converse
- Cinematography: Hector Figuera
- Editor: Michael Brown
- Running time: 4h 50m
- Production companies: Roger Gimbel Productions; EMI Television

Original release
- Network: ABC
- Release: September 30 – October 2, 1981

The Manions of America is a miniseries for American television made in 1981, which was broadcast over six hours on ABC. The subject of the series was Irish immigrants to the United States during the Great Famine of the mid-19th century. It was directed by Joseph Sargent and created by Agnes Nixon, creator of All My Children. British dramatist Rosemary Anne Sisson joined Nixon as co-writer.

Manions was the first American role for actor Pierce Brosnan and co-starred Kate Mulgrew, David Soul, Linda Purl and Steve Forrest.

== Plot ==
A six-hour television miniseries about an Irish farmer who comes to the United States. He's worn tired of repression in England and the Great Famine. After arriving in America, he takes a job in a gunpowder factory, which he eventually becomes the manager of. He is also reunited with a woman from England he fell in love with a long time ago. Then the American Civil War breaks out.

== Cast ==
- Kathleen Beller as Maureen O'Brian
- Pierce Brosnan as Rory O'Manion
- Steve Forrest as James Kent
- Peter Gilmore as Jim O'Brien
- Linda Purl as Deirdre O'Manion
- Nicholas Hammond as Padric O'Manion / Sean O'Manion
- Simon MacCorkindale as David Clement
- Kate Mulgrew as Rachel Clement
- Anthony Quayle as Lord Montgomery
- Barbara Parkins as Charlotte Kent
- Simon Rouse as Eamon
- David Soul as Caleb Staunton

== Reception ==
Judy Flanders from The Morning Call panned the series, calling it a "lugubrious lump of trash, as rotten as the potatoes that caused the Irish famine of 1845 from which this series was sprung". William Hickey of The Plain Dealer wasn't impressed with the miniseries either, saying it "is the kind of work that will be most appreciated by 'Bicycle Irish', the ones who wear shamrocks on their sleeves and root their heads off each Saturday autumn afternoon for the Fighting Slovenians who play football for Notre Dame".

In his review for The Orlando Sentinel, John O'Connor opined that the series is "less an exploration than a construction, jumping to a panting bed scene whenever the more violent actions subside temporarily". He did find the cast to be "competent" with Pierce Brosnan and Kate Mulgrew "managing to be sympathetic and believable despite the generally wooden dialogue". He also noted that the production "was good" and "occasionally the plot machinations generate a perverse interest of their own, however, the only thing lacking is substance".
