= Andersonville =

Andersonville may refer to:

== Places ==
=== United States ===
- Andersonville, Georgia, site of an American Civil War prisoner of war camp
  - Andersonville Prison, Confederate prisoner of war camp in Georgia holding Union soldiers
- Andersonville, Chicago, a neighborhood in Chicago, Illinois
  - Andersonville Commercial Historic District, an historic district in Chicago
- Andersonville, Iowa
- Andersonville, Indiana
- Andersonville, Michigan
- Andersonville, Ohio, an unincorporated community
- Andersonville, South Carolina
- Andersonville, Tennessee
- Andersonville, Virginia
- Andersonville, West Virginia

=== Elsewhere ===
- Andersonville, New Brunswick, Canada

== Other uses ==
- Andersonville (novel), Pulitzer Prize–winning 1956 novel by MacKinlay Kantor
- Andersonville (film), 1996 film based on a prisoner of war camp prisoner's diary
- Andersonville Theological Seminary, Camilla, Georgia, U.S.
- "Andersonville", a song by Dave Alvin from his 1991 album Blue Blvd

== See also ==
- The Andersonville Trial, 1970 film
