= Sunshine (American TV series) =

1975 American comedy TV series

- Elizabeth Cheshire and Cliff De Young as Jill and Sam Hayden in Sunshine
- Genre: Comedy-drama
- Written by: Carol Sobieski; Corey Fischer
- Directed by: George Eckstein; Daniel Haller; Bernard L. Kowalski
- Starring: Cliff DeYoung; Elizabeth Cheshire; Bill Mumy
- Opening theme: "Sunshine on My Shoulders"
- Composer: John Denver
- Country of origin: United States
- Original language: English
- No. of seasons: 1
- No. of episodes: 13

Original release
- Network: NBC
- Release: March 6 – May 29, 1975

Sunshine is a 1975 American television comedy-drama series starring Cliff DeYoung and Elizabeth Cheshire, about a hippie musician raising his young daughter alone after the death of his wife. The series was based on the 1973 made-for-TV movie Sunshine and DeYoung, Bill Mumy, Corey Fischer, and Meg Foster all reprised their roles from the film. The series originally ran for 13 episodes on NBC in the spring of 1975. The show's opening theme was John Denver's hit song "Sunshine on My Shoulders."

== Plot ==
Three years after the death of his wife Kate (which occurred at the end of the 1973 Sunshine film), musician Sam Hayden (Cliff DeYoung) is raising their young daughter Jill (Elizabeth Cheshire) as a single father. Sam struggles to make ends meet by playing in a folk rock trio with Weaver (Bill Mumy) and Givits (Corey Fischer) and by doing various day jobs. Although Sam's responsibilities leave little time for him to date women, he hopes to find one he can love who will also be a good mother to Jill. Meanwhile, Weaver, Givits, and Sam's occasional girlfriend Nora (Meg Foster) pitch in to help Sam care for Jill.

== Cast ==
- Cliff DeYoung as Sam Hayden
- Elizabeth Cheshire as Jill Hayden
- Bill Mumy as Weaver
- Corey Fischer as Givits
- Meg Foster as Nora

== Episodes ==
No.	Title	Directed by	Written by	Original release date
1	"Sweet Misery"	George Eckstein	Carol Sobieski	March 6, 1975
Feeling that Jill needs a mother in her life, Sam unsuccessfully tries to get his friend Nora to marry him.
2	"White Bread and Margarine"	Unknown	Unknown	March 13, 1975
Sam must convince a social worker that he is a fit parent.
3	"Intensive Care"	Unknown	Unknown	March 20, 1975
When Sam is suddenly hospitalized, his bandmates Weaver and Givits take care of Jill.
4	"Father Nature"	Unknown	Unknown	March 27, 1975
Sam writes a song that Jill will perform in the school play.
5	"Jill"	Unknown	Unknown	April 3, 1975
Weaver takes Jill to the zoo when Sam can't get off work.
6	"Buy the Book"	Unknown	Unknown	April 10, 1975
Sam receives a free encyclopedia if he agrees to purchase weekly supplements for three years.
7	"A Houseboat is Not a Home"	Unknown	Unknown	April 17, 1975
Sam wants to buy his own house.
8	"The Angel of Doom"	Unknown	Unknown	April 24, 1975
Jill doesn't understand the meaning of death.
9	"Song for Montana (1)"	Unknown	Unknown	May 1, 1975
Sam sees a girl named Montana at a singing competition and falls in love with her.
10	"Song for Montana (2)"	Unknown	Unknown	May 8, 1975
Sam's romance with Montana comes to a bittersweet end when she chooses her musical aspirations over him.
11	"Have a Nice Day"	Unknown	Unknown	May 15, 1975
Sam injures his leg in the woods, and Jill is the only person around.
12	"Leave It to Weaver"	Unknown	Unknown	May 22, 1975
Weaver wants to quit Sam's musical group.
13	"Why Sam's Paid"	Unknown	Unknown	May 29, 1975
Sam gets a new job as a private eye.

== Reception ==
Although the series drew praise from critics for its quality and realism, its timeslot forced it to compete for young viewers with the popular CBS series The Waltons, and older viewers were not interested in watching a show about a hippie. A Chicago Tribune reviewer also blamed the series' failure on its portrayal of daughter Jill as an ill-mannered "pest". Sunshine performed poorly in the Nielsen ratings and was cancelled after 13 episodes.

After its cancellation, the series was described as being "before its time" and "one of the most interesting failures" of the season. Five episodes of Sunshine were later combined into a feature-length movie called My Sweet Lady which was widely circulated in England, Japan and Australia, resulting in the characters becoming better known in those countries than they were in the United States.

In 1977, NBC took the unusual step of reuniting the original cast of the cancelled series for a two-hour holiday television film, Sunshine Christmas, which the network first aired on December 12, 1977. In the movie, Sam and Jill return to his native Texas to visit Sam's parents, and Sam rekindles a romance with his high school sweetheart.

== Book adaptation ==
In 1975, a novelization of the series by Norma Klein entitled The Sunshine Years was published. Klein had previously written the novelization of the Sunshine film, and later did the same for Sunshine Christmas.
