= Naked Angels =

1969 film

- Theatrical release poster
- Directed by: Bruce D. Clark
- Written by: Bruce D. Clark; Marc Siegler
- Produced by: David R. Dawdy
- Starring: Michael Greene; Jennifer Gan; Richard Rust
- Cinematography: Robert Eberlein; William B. Kaplan
- Edited by: Johanna Bryant
- Music by: Jeff Simmons; Randy Sterling
- Distributed by: Favorite Films
- Release date: September 19, 1969
- Running time: 89 minutes
- Country: United States
- Language: English

Naked Angels is a 1969 American outlaw biker film directed by Bruce D. Clark. Starring Michael Greene as Mother, Jennifer Gan as Marlene, and Richard Rust as Fingers, it provides an insider's perspective at the lifestyle of outlawed bikers. Actor Corey Fischer makes an appearance, as well as Penelope Spheeris in her first role. Naked Angels was the last movie distributed by Favorite Films.

== Plot ==
The story concerns a deadly feud between two rival bike gangs. The Angels are out for revenge against their rival gang, the Las Vegas Hotdoggers, who severely beat their leader, Mother (Michael Greene).

Mother is just returning to the Angels and his old lady, Marlene (Jennifer Gan), has become the property of Fingers (Richard Rust), the new head of the clan. When Mother reappears, he quickly reassumes the gang's leadership and rights to the strawberry blonde, lascivious, foul-mouthed Marlene.

The Angels go looking for the Hotdoggers at their hang out, a bar in Las Vegas. Not finding their rivals, the Angels ruin the bar and terrorize the local citizenry. A lone Hotdogger betrays his gang and tells the Angels of a secret mine to hang out in the desert where they can find his gang.

Later that evening, Marlene and Mother are riding his chopper around Vegas, when a showgirl in a car catches his eye. He leaves with the showgirl and returns to find Marlene is livid with rage. Setting out into the desert, the Angels and Mother argue about what to do and how to travel through the said desert. Marlene angrily insults Mother. The mother gets angry and says that everyone in the gang can have Marlene. No one in the gang accepts, so Mother takes off on his own.

The Angels and finally Mother meet again at the mine hideout with the Hotdoggers. A dynamite stick brings the Hotdoggers out of the mine for a brawl with tire chains, knives, fists, and boots. The Hotdogger leader steals Angel's bike, but Mother rides him down and finishes him off while the Angels look on and cheer.

After taking revenge on all the Hotdoggers, Fingers and Mother fight it out at the end, but only one can be the leader of the Angels.

== Production ==
The cast of Naked Angels is actually made up of UCLA film students. They were advised by a former member of the Hells Angels, contributing to the gritty feeling of the film. Financed by Roger Corman and produced by film student David Dawdy, the film utilized Francis Ford Coppola's camera truck and technician. It was written in three weekends and shot in three weeks.

=== Production techniques ===
The film, released in color, takes advantage of the neon lighting of Las Vegas as many of the filming sequences occur there. The viewer gets a true historical representation of the city's state near the end of the '60s. The film has sequences where the footage alternates between moving action and still photography, which gives it an "art film" feeling. Along with the electric fuzz guitar soundtrack, there are many "dream" or "hallucination" sequences in the film giving it a surreal atmosphere. The camera locations on the motorcycle riding sequences give the viewer a point of view that is unusual in these types of moving action sequences.

== Soundtrack ==
The film's soundtrack was co-written by Jeff Simmons (eventually to become a member of Frank Zappa's Mothers of Invention) and Randy Sterling. It was originally released in 1969 on Frank Zappa's "Straight Records" label. It has been reissued on CD and vinyl, in combination with Simmons' next album Lucille Has Messed My Mind Up from the same year.

=== Track listing ===
1. Naked Angels Theme 4:10
2. Ride Into Vegas 1:16
3. Vegas Boogie 3:05
4. Vegas Pickup 4:05
5. Cop Out 1:12
6. First Desert Ride 1:45
7. Rank 2:00
8. Boinin' (Third Ride) 3:32
9. Scots Breath 1:40
10. Rat Grind 2:05
11. Bar Dream 3:36
12. Camper Scene 2:25
13. Toccata for Truck 3:35
14. End Theme 1:12

The film was scored by Jeff live, laying down the tracks while watching the scenes.

== Home media ==
Shout! Factory released Naked Angels as part of Roger Corman's Cult Classics on their Select DVD series on August 21, 2012.

== See also ==
- Outlaw biker film
- List of biker films
- Exploitation film
- Cult film
