= The Great Gundown =

1977 film

- Theatrical release poster
- Directed by: Paul Hunt
- Screenplay by: Steve Fisher
- Story by: Paul Hunt; Robert Padilla
- Produced by: Paul Norbert
- Starring: Robert Padilla; Malila Saint Duval; Richard Rust; Steve Oliver; David Eastman; Stanley Adams; Rockne Tarkington
- Cinematography: Ronald Víctor García
- Edited by: Tony de Zarraga
- Music by: Alan Caddy; Robert Fallon
- Production company: Pacific International Enterprises
- Distributed by: AVCO Embassy Pictures
- Release date: August 4, 1977
- Running time: 95 minutes
- Country: United States
- Language: English

The Great Gundown (also known as Savage Red, Outlaw White) is a 1977 American Western film directed by Paul Hunt and written by Steve Fisher. The film stars Robert Padilla, Malila Saint Duval, Richard Rust, Steve Oliver, David Eastman, Stanley Adams and Rockne Tarkington. The film was released on August 4, 1977, by AVCO Embassy Pictures.

== Cast ==
- Robert Padilla as Mario Ochoa / The Savage
- Malila Saint Duval as Teresa
- Richard Rust as Joe Riles
- Steve Oliver as Arden
- David Eastman as Edgely
- Stanley Adams as Buck
- Rockne Tarkington as Sutton
- Michael Christian as Darwood
- Michael Greene as Preacher Gage
- Owen Orr as "Happy" Hogan
- Paul Hunt as Jim, The Gunsel
- Ted Markland as Herien
- Haydee Dubarry as Tia Maria
- Lucas Andreas as Deputy
- Gene Borkan as Brink
- Stephen Whittaker as Laredo
- John Bellah as Billy "Bullit"
- Darrell Cotton as Darrell
- A.J. Solari as A.J.
- Frank Packard as Jack
- Miki St. Clair as Miki
- John Jarrell as Townsman
- Joe A. Padilla as Jess
- Brian Padilla as The Boy
- James Trujillo as Ramon
- Wesley Speake as The Bartender
- Tom Garcia as Old Indian
- Cecilia Speake as Teresa's Mother
- Don Megowan as "Baldy"
- John Chilton as Higgins
- Don McGovern as Calhoun
- Patrick Hawley as Morley
- Doodles Weaver as Baggage Man
- Noble "Kid" Chissell as The Train Engineer
- Virgil Frye as John Bayers
