= Off Limits (1988 film) =

1988 film by Christopher Crowe

- Theatrical release poster
- Directed by: Christopher Crowe
- Written by: Christopher Crowe; Jack Thibeau
- Produced by: Alan Barnette
- Starring: Willem Dafoe; Gregory Hines; Fred Ward; Amanda Pays; Scott Glenn
- Cinematography: David Gribble
- Edited by: Douglas Ibold
- Music by: James Newton Howard
- Distributed by: 20th Century Fox
- Release date: 11 March 1988
- Running time: 102 minutes
- Language: English
- Box office: $7.2 million

Off Limits is a 1988 action-thriller film set during the Vietnam War starring Willem Dafoe and Gregory Hines and directed by Christopher Crowe. The term "off limits" referred to the area where the original crime took place, an area of Saigon off limits to military personnel. The name of the film was changed to Saigon or Saigon: Off Limits when it was released throughout the rest of the world.

The film marks Willem Dafoe's second Vietnam War film. He was assisted in preparing for this role by Vietnam Veteran and former Counterintelligence Special Agent Ed Murphy. Dafoe had previously starred in Platoon and would go on to play roles in Born on the Fourth of July and Flight of the Intruder. Although set during the war, the tale is more of a mystery than a story about the war.

== Plot ==
In 1968, Sergeant First Class Buck McGriff and Sergeant First Class Albaby Perkins are two joint services Criminal Investigation Division (CID) agents on duty in war torn Saigon. When a prostitute is found murdered they discover that the prime suspects are high ranking U.S. Army officers. As they investigate they find that there have been a string of at least six murders in the last year, but the previous inquiry was shut down from higher up the chain of command. Investigations lead them to Colonel Dexter Armstrong, but Armstrong rules himself out of inquiries by committing suicide. With the help of a French nun Sister Nicole and their non-commissioned officer in charge, Master Sergeant Dix, they finally close in on their target. As their investigation leads them closer and closer to the murderer, they find their lives are in danger.

== Cast ==
- Willem Dafoe as Sergeant First Class Buck McGriff
- Gregory Hines as Sergeant First Class Albaby Perkins
- Fred Ward as Master Sergeant Benjamin Dix
- Amanda Pays as Nicole
- Lim Kay Tong as Lime Green
- Scott Glenn as Colonel Dexter Armstrong
- David Alan Grier as Rogers
- Keith David as Specialist Five Maurice
- Raymond O'Connor as Elgin Flowers
- Richard Brooks as Preacher
- Thuy An Luu as Lanh (credited as Thuy Ann Luu)
- Richard Lee Reed as Colonel Sparks
- Woody Brown as Co-Pilot
- Ken Siu as Plowboy
- Viladda Vanadurongwan as Sister Agnes

== Reception ==
The movie received a mixed reception. It holds an approval rating of 45% on Rotten Tomatoes based on 11 reviews.

=== Box office ===
The movie was not successful at the box office, grossing only $7.2 million. However, it later found its audience on home video and on cable TV, primarily HBO and Showtime.
