= The Stone Killer =

1973 film by Michael Winner

- Theatrical release poster
- Directed by: Michael Winner
- Screenplay by: Gerald Wilson
- Based on: A Complete State of Death by John Gardner
- Produced by: Michael Winner
- Starring: Charles Bronson; Martin Balsam
- Cinematography: Richard Moore
- Music by: Roy Budd
- Production company: De Laurentiis International Manufacturing Company S.p.A.
- Distributed by: Columbia Pictures
- Release date: August 8, 1973
- Running time: 95 minutes
- Countries: Italy; United States
- Language: English
- Box office: $1,300,000 (US/ Canada rentals)

The Stone Killer is a 1973 American action neo noir thriller film produced and directed by Michael Winner and starring Charles Bronson. It came out in between The Mechanic (1972) and Death Wish (1974), all three of which teamed up actor/director Bronson and Winner. Norman Fell and John Ritter appear as cops in this film, not too long before they would reunite for the TV series Three's Company. Ritter would also soon be reunited with co-star Ralph Waite for The Waltons. Character actor Stuart Margolin plays a significant role; he also appeared in Death Wish. Cristina Raines can briefly be seen as the daughter of Waite's character; Winner would later hire Raines for the leading role in The Sentinel. It was one of many Dirty Harry-type films featuring rogue cops who don't "play by the rules" that were released in the wake of that film's success.

== Plot ==
In 1973, a Mafia don (Martin Balsam) plans to avenge the killings of a group of Mafia dons back in 1931 ("The Night of Sicilian Vespers") with a bold nationwide counter-strike against most of the current Italian and Jewish syndicate heads, by using teams of Vietnam vets instead of Mafia hit men. ("Stone killer" means a Mafia hit man who is not himself a member of the Mafia.)

A gritty, independent detective stumbles across the plot when a washed-up former hit man is killed under circumstances that make it clear that it was an inside job and that Mafia were involved. He then slowly uncovers the clues that point to a seemingly impossible plot.

== Cast ==
- Charles Bronson as Detective Lou Torrey
- Martin Balsam as Al Vescari
- David Sheiner as Guido Lorenz
- Norman Fell as Les Daniels
- Ralph Waite as Mathews
- Paul Koslo as Langley
- Stuart Margolin as Lawrence
- Lisabeth Hush as Dr. Helen Torrey
- Jack Colvin as Lionel Henry Jumper
- John Ritter as Hart
- Alfred Ryder as Tony Champion

== Production ==
The film was based on the 1969 novel A Complete State of Death by John Gardner, which introduced his maverick cop protagonist Derek Torry. The New York Times called it a "message novel, only slightly pretentious, relevant but under paced." The novel was greatly changed in the adaptation, as was the character's name – rather than Derek Torry, Bronson plays Lou Torrey.

Filming took place in May 1973.

During the shootout in the parking garage at the film's climax, stunt coordinator Alan Gibbs' seat-belt snapped and his head struck the steering wheel, causing him to sustain serious injuries in one of the numerous car crashes that take place. The cars were rentals from Hertz, who were so concerned with damage that they sent a representative to the set to reclaim them. Winner supposedly told the rep, "You should be glad we're crashing your (expletive) awful cars. You'll be able to write them off completely and get nice new ones."

== Reception ==
Roger Ebert of the Chicago Sun-Times gave the film three stars out of four and called it "a superior example of its type – tough cop against the mob – and probably the best violent big-city police movie since 'Dirty Harry.' It's not much more, nor does it mean to be; it offers stylish escapism at breakneck speed, and it gives us a chase and a gun battle that surpass themselves." Roger Greenspun of The New York Times wrote, "Anyone suspected of liking a Michael Winner movie may be assumed guilty until proven innocent. Since there is no way in which I can be proven innocent, I might as well confess to liking Winner's latest, 'The Stone Killer,' very much indeed." Arthur D. Murphy of Variety called the film "a confused, meandering crime potboiler", explaining, "The story and direction reach for so many bases that the end result is a lot of cinema razzle-dazzle without substance." Fredric Milstein of the Los Angeles Times wrote, "Want a fast, slick, violent, entertaining minor spinoff of 'The French Connection,' complete with vicious, rebellious cop who doesn't care how much property he busts up during the really spectacular chase sequence? Plus added mafiosi, junkies, hippies and all manner of bizarre New York and California locales to keep the plot just weird and complicated enough? Then see 'The Stone Killer.'" Tom Zito of The Washington Post stated, "Unfortunately the direction of Michael Winner doesn't bail 'The Stone Killer' out. Winner has recently been responsible for movies like 'Dealing' and 'The Night Comers,' films that were closer to bad television than good cinema. Like the new one, they were competently assembled without inspiration, craft without art." Tony Rayns of The Monthly Film Bulletin wrote: "On paper, The Stone Killer must have seemed a masterful compendium of the chief elements from every major gangster/thriller movie of recent years ... But in Michael Winner's less-than-masterful hands the generic is unfailingly reduced to the formularly; and the plot's near total lack of structure makes the movie seem like clips from a dozen others, strung arbitrarily together."

== See also ==
- List of American films of 1973
