= The Mean Season =

1985 film by Phillip Borsos

- Theatrical release poster
- Directed by: Phillip Borsos
- Screenplay by: Leon Piedmont
- Based on: In the Heat of the Summer by John Katzenbach
- Produced by: David Foster; Lawrence Turman
- Starring: Kurt Russell; Mariel Hemingway; Richard Jordan; Richard Masur
- Cinematography: Frank Tidy
- Edited by: Duwayne Dunham
- Music by: Lalo Schifrin
- Production company: The Turman-Foster Company
- Distributed by: Orion Pictures
- Release date: February 15, 1985
- Running time: 103 minutes
- Country: United States
- Language: English
- Budget: $10 million
- Box office: $4,300,000 (USA)

The Mean Season is a 1985 American thriller film directed by Phillip Borsos, and starring Kurt Russell, Mariel Hemingway, Richard Jordan, Richard Masur, Joe Pantoliano, Luis Tamayo and Andy García. The screenplay, written by Christopher Crowe under the pseudonym Leon Piedmont, is based on the 1982 novel In the Heat of the Summer by John Katzenbach.

The film was named after the term of the same name that refers to a pattern of weather that occurs in Florida during the late summer months. In order to achieve accuracy for the scenes that take place in the busy newsroom, the filmmakers used Miami Herald reporters as on-set consultants and extras and shot in the actual newsroom as opposed to recreating it on a soundstage.

== Plot ==
Malcolm Anderson is a reporter for a Miami newspaper, who is burned out from years of covering the worst crimes in the city. He promises his girlfriend Christine that they will move away from the city, but he ends up covering a series of grisly murders by a serial killer who calls him telling the reporter that he will kill again. The lines between covering the story and becoming part of it are blurred.

== Cast ==
- Kurt Russell as Malcolm Anderson
- Mariel Hemingway as Christine Connelly
- Richard Jordan as Alan Delour
- Richard Masur as Bill Nolan
- Richard Bradford as Phil Wilson
- Joe Pantoliano as Andy Porter
- Andy García as Ray Martinez
- William Smith as Albert O'Shaughnessy

== Production ==
=== Development and writing ===
Veteran crime reporter for the Miami Herald John Katzenbach wrote the novel In the Heat of the Summer, based on his years of experiences and of stories told to him by fellow reporters he knew. He tried to examine what he described as “the nature of reporting and the ambiguity and ambivalence of the job. There's a fundamental dilemma in, on the one hand, thinking 'How can I intrude on these people at the moment of exquisite agony?' and, on the other hand thinking 'My God, I'm sitting on a terrific story!'”

Producer David Foster, who was also a graduate of the journalism school at the University of Southern California, was given Katzenbach’s manuscript and agreed to bring it to the big screen along with fellow producer Lawrence Turman. The film was named The Mean Season after the term of the same name that refers to a pattern of weather that occurs in Florida during the late summer months. Hot mornings with sticky weather lead into violent thunderstorms that blow in from the Caribbean and the Gulf of Mexico in the afternoon. However, the rain doesn't alleviate the heat and only makes things hotter that evening. This cycle repeats every day for a month.

Foster and director Phillip Borsos spent time studying the way people worked in the Herald. Borsos said, “I wanted to know what goes on at 3 p.m., at 5 p.m. There's a wonderful flow of traffic at different times of the day. Gradually, the room fills up. Later, there's a ferocious attack at the computer terminals. A lot of newspaper movies have 10 people in the background, or 50, but there's always the same level of action. If the script said 3:10 p.m., and the first edition was an hour off the streets, I wanted to know what would be happening.”

Coincidentally, when Borsos and his crew arrived at the Herald offices in April 1984, Christopher Bernard Wilder, a man suspected of kidnapping and killing several young women, shot himself in a confrontation with the police at a gas station in New Hampshire. Borsos remembers “it seemed as though there were about 500 reporters in the office, and everybody was going insane.”

In order to prepare for the role, Kurt Russell followed around veteran Herald crime reporter Edna Buchanan and photographer Tim Chapman. At first, he couldn’t figure out "how they justify what they do. But I found out that these are very caring people. They may be callous about how they do their jobs, but they're not callous about people. That allowed me, from a reporter's point of view, to have the truth of why Malcolm was able to press on when some people thought he shouldn't." Richard Masur prepared for his role as an editor by spending several days at the Herald’s city desk.

In order to achieve accuracy for the scenes that take place in the busy newsroom, Borsos used Herald reporters as on-set consultants and extras. Katzenbach told Foster, “that if he made a film about newspapers it was extremely important not to cut corners when presenting the journalistic aspects.” To that end, the production shot in the actual Herald newsroom between the hours of 10:30 p.m. and 6:30 a.m. as opposed to recreating it on a soundstage. None of the actual clutter and look of the place was changed for the film. Foster said, “I don't think we could have had the aroma, the feel we had at the Herald. It had a tone, that city room. I had no idea news reporters were that sloppy.” However, Borsos would have preferred to adopt a more stylized look. He said, “I preferred to have it look somewhat stylized and slightly unreal, more what you would call a 1950's film-noir type of picture. I think making it slightly abstract can be a way of reaching more people. When something is too real, that can almost be a way of limiting you.” Katzenbach was also a regular on the set as a consultant.

The actual City of Miami Police Department's SWAT team appeared in a scene where Russell's character enters the house of a victim. Many interiors were also filmed inside the City of Miami Police Department Headquarters as well as the Richard E. Gerstein Criminal Justice Building.

== Reception ==
=== Box office ===
The Mean Season was released on February 15, 1985 in 876 theaters and grossed USD $1.5 million on its opening weekend. It went on to make $4.3 million in North America.

=== Critical response ===
In her review for The New York Times, Janet Maslin wrote that the film "has a brisk pace and a lot of momentum. It also has a few more surprises than the material needed, since Mr. Borsos, who for the most part works in a tense, streamlined style, likes red herrings." Jack Kroll in Newsweek wrote "This movie has the weather of Body Heat, the moral stance of Absence of Malice and the perverse plot-angle of Tightrope. It's also not as good as any of these". In her review for The Washington Post, Rita Kempley wrote "Overall the film seems a little flat, a little stale. The clouds roil and the thunder claps like a gun report".

On Rotten Tomatoes, the film holds a rating of 64% from 22 reviews with the consensus: "A thriller that plays at social commentary, The Mean Season fumbles with its weightier themes, but does so in a generally watchable way." Metacritic, which uses a weighted average, assigned the film a score of 55 out of 100, based on 11 critics, indicating "mixed or average" reviews. Audiences polled by CinemaScore gave the film an average grade of "C+" on an A+ to F scale.
