= My Sweet Lady =

1971 John Denver song

Single by Cliff DeYoung
- B-side: "Sunshine on My Shoulders"
- Released: 1973
- Recorded: 1973
- Genre: Folk rock
- Length: 2:40
- Label: MCA Records
- Songwriter: John Denver
- Producers: Gil Rodin and Johnny Musso

Cliff DeYoung singles chronology
"My Sweet Lady" (1973)	"She Bent Me Straight Again" (1974)

My Sweet Lady is a song written and first recorded by John Denver, and was included on his Poems, Prayers & Promises LP in 1971.

Denver released it as a single in 1977. Record World said that "a lilting string arrangement complements his sincere vocal and gentle acoustic guitar work."

== Cliff DeYoung recording ==
It was covered by American actor and musician Cliff DeYoung, whose 1973 MCA Records release became an international hit peaking at No. 7 Billboard Adult Contemporary chart and No. 17 on the Billboard Hot 100, No. 14 in Canada and No. 42 in Australia. The song was part of a soundtrack album to Sunshine (1973 film).

=== Chart performance ===
Chart (1974)	Peak position
Australia (Kent Music Report)	42
Canada	14
US Billboard Easy Listening	7
US Billboard Hot 100	17
