= Joseph Sargent =

American film director and actor (1925–2014)

- Born: Giuseppe Danielle Sorgente; July 22, 1925; Jersey City, New Jersey, U.S.
- Died: December 22, 2014 (aged 89); Malibu, California, U.S.
- Other name: Joseph Daniel Sargent
- Occupations: Director; producer; actor
- Years active: 1951–2009
- Known for: White Lightning; MacArthur; Nightmares; Jaws: The Revenge; The Taking of Pelham One Two Three
- Spouses: Mary Carver (m. 1952; div. 1968) Carolyn Nelson (m. 1970)
- Children: 2, including Lia Sargent

Joseph Sargent (born Giuseppe Danielle Sorgente; July 22, 1925 – December 22, 2014) was an American director, producer, and actor of film and television. His directing career spanned nearly 50 years, between 1959 and 2008, and over 90 productions. He was a four-time Primetime Emmy Award and Directors Guild of America Award recipient.

Sargent's directing credits included the science-fiction film Colossus: The Forbin Project (1970), the Burt Reynolds action film White Lightning (1973), the thriller The Taking of Pelham One Two Three (1974), the biopic MacArthur (1977) starring Gregory Peck, and the horror anthology Nightmares (1983). On television, he was known as a prolific director of telefilms and miniseries, winning the Emmy Award for Outstanding Directing for a Limited Series or Movie three times.

He was the father of voice actress Lia Sargent.

== Early life ==
Sargent was born Giuseppe Danielle Sorgente in Jersey City, New Jersey, the son of Italian parents Maria (née Noviello) and Domenico Sorgente. Sargent served in the U.S. Army during World War II, where he fought in the Battle of the Bulge.

== Career ==
Sargent began his career as an actor, appearing in numerous films and television programs.

He appeared in an uncredited role as a soldier in the film From Here to Eternity (1953) where he also met his first wife Mary Carver on the set. In the mid 1950s Sargent switched to directing; over the next 15 years his directing credits would include episodes of television series Lassie, The Invaders (four episodes), The Man from U.N.C.L.E. and the Star Trek episode "The Corbomite Maneuver".

He appeared in the Western series Gunsmoke, once in 1957 as a man, turned drunk, who lost his drive to live, in the episode "Skid Row" (S2E22); then again as a drunk cowboy who gets killed in The Longbranch Saloon in the 1959 episode "There Never Was A Horse" (S4E35).

In 1970, he directed the science fiction thriller Colossus: The Forbin Project. In 1971, he was hired to direct Buck and the Preacher but, after a few days of shooting, was replaced by Sidney Poitier, who cited creative differences. The next year, however, he directed The Man, starring James Earl Jones, which was begun as a television movie.

He alternated between television movies and feature films during the 1970s. Sargent's directorial work from this period includes The Taking of Pelham One Two Three, the TV movies Hustling with Lee Remick and Jill Clayburgh, Maybe I'll Come Home in the Spring with Sally Field, and Tribes with Jan-Michael Vincent and Darren McGavin, as well as international award-winning ABC film The Night That Panicked America. In 1974, he won his first Directors Guild of America Award for The Marcus-Nelson Murders (1973), which was the TV movie pilot for the Kojak series.

In the 1980s, Sargent directed the mini-series Manions of America, which featured Pierce Brosnan, and Space. In 1987 he directed Jaws: The Revenge, the third sequel to Steven Spielberg's 1975 classic. The film received entirely negative reviews. Roger Ebert called his directing of the climactic sequence "incompetent," and he was nominated for Worst Director in the 1987 Golden Raspberry Awards.

He concentrated on TV movies after Jaws: The Revenge, including The Karen Carpenter Story, The Long Island Incident, Dostoevsky's Crime and Punishment, and the 2007 remake of the Sally Field docudrama Sybil.

Sargent spent time as the Senior Filmmaker-in-Residence for the Directing program at the American Film Institute Conservatory in Los Angeles.

== Personal life ==
Joseph Sargent and his wife Carolyn (née Nelson) Sargent laid the groundwork for Deaf West Theatre.

== Death ==
Sargent died of complications from heart disease at his home in Malibu, California, on December 22, 2014. He was 89.

== Filmography ==
| Year | Title | Director | Producer | Notes |
|---|---|---|---|---|
| 1959 | Street-Fighter | Yes | | Lost film. |
| 1966 | One Spy Too Many | Yes | | Re-edit of a two-part The Man from U.N.C.L.E. episode "Alexander the Greater Affair" with different shots and dialog |
| 1967 | The Spy in the Green Hat | Yes | | Re-edit of a two-part The Man from U.N.C.L.E. episodes "The Concrete Overcoat Affair" with new scenes added |
| 1968 | The Hell with Heroes | Yes | | |
| 1968 | The Sunshine Patriot | Yes | | Television film |
| 1970 | Colossus: The Forbin Project | Yes | | |
| 1970 | Tribes | Yes | | ABC Movie of the Week |
| 1972 | Maybe I'll Come Home in the Spring | Yes | Yes | ABC Movie of the Week |
| 1972 | The Man | Yes | | |
| 1973 | Sunshine | Yes | | Television film |
| 1973 | The Marcus-Nelson Murders | Yes | | Kojak pilot |
| 1973 | White Lightning | Yes | | |
| 1974 | The Taking of Pelham One Two Three | Yes | | |
| 1975 | Friendly Persuasion | Yes | Yes | Television film |
| 1975 | The Night That Panicked America | Yes | Yes | Television film |
| 1975 | Hustling | Yes | | Television film |
| 1977 | MacArthur | Yes | | |
| 1979 | Goldengirl | Yes | | |
| 1980 | Coast to Coast | Yes | | |
| 1980 | Amber Waves | Yes | | Television film |
| 1981 | Freedom | Yes | | Television film |
| 1981 | Manions of America | Yes | | Miniseries |
| 1983 | Nightmares | Yes | | |
| 1983 | Memorial Day | Yes | | Television film |
| 1983 | Choices of the Heart | Yes | Yes | Television film |
| 1984 | Terrible Joe Moran | Yes | | Television film |
| 1985 | Love Is Never Silent | Yes | | Television film |
| 1985 | Space | Yes | | Miniseries |
| 1986 | There Must Be a Pony | Yes | Yes | Television film |
| 1987 | Jaws: The Revenge | Yes | Yes | |
| 1989 | The Karen Carpenter Story | Yes | | Television film |
| 1989 | Day One | Yes | | Television film |
| 1990 | The Incident | Yes | | Television film |
| 1990 | Caroline? | Yes | | Television film |
| 1990 | Ivory Hunters | Yes | | Television film |
| 1991 | Never Forget | Yes | | Television film |
| 1992 | Miss Rose White | Yes | | Television film |
| 1992 | Somebody's Daughter | Yes | Yes | Television film |
| 1993 | Skylark | Yes | Yes | Television film |
| 1994 | World War II: When Lions Roared | Yes | | Miniseries |
| 1995 | My Antonia | Yes | | Television film |
| 1995 | Streets of Laredo | Yes | | Miniseries |
| 1997 | Miss Evers' Boys | Yes | | Television film |
| 1997 | Mandela and de Klerk | Yes | | Television film |
| 1998 | The Long Island Incident | Yes | Yes | Television film |
| 1998 | Crime and Punishment | Yes | Yes | Television film |
| 1998 | The Wall | Yes | Yes | Television film |
| 1999 | A Lesson Before Dying | Yes | | Television film |
| 2000 | For Love or Country: The Arturo Sandoval Story | Yes | | Television film |
| 2001 | Bojangles | Yes | | Television film |
| 2003 | Salem Witch Trials | Yes | | Television film |
| 2003 | Out of the Ashes | Yes | | Television film |
| 2004 | Something the Lord Made | Yes | | Television film |
| 2005 | Warm Springs | Yes | | Television film |
| 2007 | Sybil | Yes | | Television film |
| 2008 | Sweet Nothing in My Ear | Yes | | Television film |

== Awards and nominations ==
Sargent was nominated for several Emmy awards, winning four. Early in his career, he won a Directors Guild of America Award for the Kojak pilot. Sargent was nominated for eight DGA awards for television movies, more than any other director in this category.

| Year | Association | Category | Nominated work | Result |
|---|---|---|---|---|
| 1971 | Primetime Emmy Award | Outstanding Directorial Achievement in Drama - A Single Program | Tribes | Nominated |
| 1973 | Primetime Emmy Award | Outstanding Directorial Achievement in Drama - A Single Program | The Marcus-Nelson Murders | Won |
| 1973 | Directors Guild of America Award | Directors Guild of America Award for Outstanding Directing – Miniseries or TV Film | The Marcus-Nelson Murders | Won |
| 1980 | Primetime Emmy Award | Outstanding Directing in a Limited Series or a Special | Amber Waves | Nominated |
| 1984 | Brussels International Fantastic Film Festival | Golden Raven | Nightmares | Won |
| 1986 | Primetime Emmy Award | Outstanding Directing in a Miniseries or Special | Love Is Never Silent | Won |
| 1988 | Razzie Award | Worst Picture | Jaws: The Revenge | Nominated |
| 1988 | Razzie Award | Worst Director | Jaws: The Revenge | Nominated |
| 1990 | Primetime Emmy Award | Outstanding Directing in a Miniseries or Special | Caroline? | Won |
| 1992 | Primetime Emmy Award | Outstanding Individual Achievement in Directing for a Miniseries or Special | Miss Rose White | Won |
| 1995 | Directors Guild of America Award | Outstanding Directing – Miniseries or TV Film | World War II: When Lions Roared | Nominated |
| 1998 | Directors Guild of America Award | Outstanding Directing – Miniseries or TV Film | Miss Evers' Boys | Nominated |
| 1999 | Primetime Emmy Award | Outstanding Directing for a Miniseries or Movie | A Lesson Before Dying | Nominated |
| 2001 | Directors Guild of America Award | Outstanding Directing – Miniseries or TV Film | For Love or Country: The Arturo Sandoval Story | Nominated |
| 2004 | Directors Guild of America Award | Outstanding Directing in a Television Film | Something the Lord Made | Won |
| 2004 | Primetime Emmy Award | Outstanding Directing for a Miniseries, Movie or Dramatic Special | Something the Lord Made | Nominated |
| 2005 | Directors Guild of America Award | Outstanding Directing – Miniseries or TV Film | Warm Springs | Won |
| 2005 | Primetime Emmy Award | Outstanding Directing for a Miniseries, Movie or Dramatic Special | Warm Springs | Nominated |
