= Whispers in the Dark (film) =

1992 American film by Christopher Crowe

- Theatrical release poster
- Directed by: Christopher Crowe
- Written by: Christopher Crowe
- Produced by: Martin Bregman; Michael Bregman
- Starring: Annabella Sciorra; Jamey Sheridan; Anthony La Paglia; Jill Clayburgh; John Leguizamo; Deborah Unger; Alan Alda
- Cinematography: Michael Chapman
- Edited by: Ray Hubley; Bill Pankow
- Music by: Thomas Newman
- Production companies: Paramount Pictures; Martin Bregman Productions
- Distributed by: Paramount Pictures
- Release date: August 7, 1992
- Running time: 103 minutes
- Country: United States
- Language: English
- Budget: $30 million
- Box office: $11.1 million

Whispers in the Dark is a 1992 American erotic thriller film written and directed by Christopher Crowe and starring Annabella Sciorra, Jamey Sheridan, Alan Alda, Jill Clayburgh, John Leguizamo, Deborah Unger and Anthony LaPaglia. It follows Manhattan psychiatrist Ann Hecker who finds herself in the midst of a homicide investigation after Eve Abergray, one of her patients, is mysteriously murdered.

The film was released by Paramount Pictures on August 7, 1992, and received negative reviews from critics. It was nominated for a Golden Raspberry Award for Worst Supporting Actor for Alan Alda. There is an unrated version available on LaserDisc, featuring a more explicit opening credits sequence and flashback scenes. Whispers in the Dark underperformed at the box office; however, like other erotic thrillers of the time, it found success in the home video market, and was a popular rental title.

== Plot ==
Psychiatrist Ann Hecker has a successful practice in Manhattan. During a session with a disturbed art gallery owner named Eve Abergray, Eve describes a sadomasochistic sexual encounter she recently had with her male lover. The next day, one of Ann's patients, Johnny Castillo, a painter, remarks that he passed by Eve on his way out of the office the day before, and that her beauty provoked violent sadistic fantasies in him. Ann begins suffering troubling dreams based on Eve's stories. She seeks advice from her former medical school instructors, Leo Green and his wife Sarah, both psychologists, over the recurring dreams. Meanwhile, she also begins dating Doug McDowell, a former Air Force pilot who works in her building.

During another session with Eve, Ann is shocked when Eve insists on undressing and confesses that she has fantasized about masturbating in front of Ann. She subsequently divulges another disturbing sexual encounter with her lover, in which he placed a noose around her neck and threatened to hang her. Despite the disturbing nature of the encounter, Eve says that she found it profoundly erotic. A short time later, Ann sees Doug having lunch with Eve at a restaurant where Eve has claimed to meet with her unnamed lover. During Eve's next session, Ann inquires about the identity of her sadomasochistic lover—Eve says his name is Francis Douglas McDowell. Ann responds by suggesting that Eve find another psychiatrist.

Later, Doug accosts Ann in the lobby of the building, an event which is witnessed by Eve. Eve confronts the both of them, accusing Ann of seeking out Doug to fulfill sexual fantasies spurred by Eve's stories. She also informs Ann she stole her file from the office, including numerous tapes Ann made reflecting on their sessions. The next day, Ann goes to visit Eve in an attempt to reason with her, only to find Eve's corpse hanging from a rafter in her apartment. Detective Larry Morgenstern, the officer presiding over the investigation, informs Ann that Eve died from a skull fracture, not from the hanging, suggesting she was murdered.

Morgenstern confronts Ann with the theory that Johnny murdered Eve, based on the fact that Johnny's artwork was featured at Eve's gallery. He also shows Ann evidence of Johnny's criminal history, which includes various violent attacks on women. Shortly after, Johnny breaks into Ann's apartment, binds and gags her and accuses her of helping Morgenstern frame him. Johnny smashes Ann's window and climbs onto a ledge, threatening suicide. Morgenstern arrives and attempts to reason with Johnny, who claims he has an alibi for Eve's murder; when Ann convinces him to come off the ledge, he accidentally falls to his death. Leo and Sarah console Ann, who is reminded of her father's suicide which occurred while she was in medical school.

Doug visits Ann after hearing of Johnny's death and invites her to accompany him to visit his family in Iowa. In conversation with Doug's mother, Ann is disturbed to learn that his ex-wife Jenny hung herself several years before on Christmas. Back in New York, Morgenstern warns Ann that he now believes Doug to be Eve's killer but she rebukes him. Later, Ann goes to meet Doug at an air hangar to go on a flight, only to find him with Morgenstern's dead body. Doug claims he found him there but Ann flees in terror. Doug chases after her, only to be hit by a passing car, severely injuring him.

Ann goes to convalesce with Sarah and Leo at their beach home in Cape Cod. While Sarah and Leo make a trip to the grocery store, Ann uncovers a cache of tapes Leo has kept on the sessions they had together when she was still in medical school. In the recorded notes, Leo admits to being obsessed with Ann. Leo returns in the midst of Ann listening to the tapes but pretends not to have heard them. Later, over dinner, a drunken Leo openly admits to having killed Eve and claims he had gone to her home to retrieve Ann's stolen tapes. The revelation shocks Sarah and Leo proceeds to bludgeon her with a wine bottle, rendering her unconscious. He also admits to murdering Morgenstern. Ann flees to the beach and is pursued by a belligerent Leo, who trips her by using a pole hook on her leg before attempting to drown her. In the struggle, Ann manages to gain the upper hand by grabbing the pole hook and using it to attack Leo. As Leo desperately tries to attack once more, Ann strikes the hook into his forehead, killing him. Some time later, Ann and Doug visit the air hangar together, reunited, as Ann begins taking aviation lessons herself.

== Cast ==
- Annabella Sciorra as Ann Hecker
- Jamey Sheridan as Doug McDowell
- Anthony LaPaglia as Det. Larry Morgenstern
- Jill Clayburgh as Sarah Green
- John Leguizamo as Johnny Castillo
- Deborah Unger as Eve Abergray
- Alan Alda as Leo Green
- Anthony Heald as Paul
- Jacqueline Brookes as Mrs. McDowell
- Gene Canfield as Billy O'Meara
- Joe Badalucco as Undercover Cop
- Bo Dietl as Detective Ditali

== Production ==
In an interview with Bobbie Wygant, writer/director Christopher Crowe explained where he got the inspiration for the story:

"I wanted to explore the business of psychiatry, I thought by its nature it's a very dramatic arena, fraught with tugs and pulls, and all kinds of directions, I wanted to explore that." "The other thing I wanted to do is look at the world through a woman’s eyes, I’d never done that before".

Initially, the film was set to be produced by MCA Television Entertainment and distributed by Universal Pictures. The project would end up at Paramount Pictures with a budget of $30 million. Lou Diamond Phillips and Greta Scacchi were slated to star in the film as Doug McDowell and Ann Hecker but both actors dropped out.

Principal photography began on October 21, 1991. Filming took place in and around Manhattan in New York City. The scenes of Ann (Annabella Sciorra)'s apartment was filmed at 500 5th Avenue in Manhattan. The lake house scenes were filmed in Nantucket, Massachusetts. Due to severe cold weather in Massachusetts at the time, some of the filming of the water front scenes were done in Sebastian, Florida. Production was completed on January 18, 1992.

== Release ==
=== Censorship ===
Initially, the Motion Picture Association of America (MPAA) gave Whispers in the Dark an NC-17 rating due to an explicit sex sequence shown in the opening sequence. Producer Martin Bregman deemed the MPAA's rating "arbitrary," and after minimal cuts were made, the film was given an R rating.

=== Box office ===
The film was released on August 7, 1992, in 1,188 theatres, making $3.2 million in its opening weekend. While it grossed over $11 million, it was not considered to be financially successful.

=== Critical response ===
Caryn James of The New York Times said, "in its worst moments, [the film] is exploitative, with the detective flashing gruesome photos of tortured women at Ann. More often, it is so loopy it should have been played for laughs." Todd McCarthy of Variety stated, "A turn-off psycho-sexual thriller, Whispers in the Dark grows steadily more absurd by the reel until literally stumbling into the ocean at its climax. Gene Siskel of the Chicago Tribune gave the film zero stars out of four, calling it "the leading candidate for the title of Worst Movie of the Year" and "so bad that it could catch on as a camp classic on college campuses this fall." Owen Gleiberman of Entertainment Weekly gave the film a C− grade. Los Angeles Times staff writer Peter Rainer called it "a textbook thriller" and stated "Doug is so Too Good to Be True that, when the inevitable murder makes its scheduled stop, [the audience] can sniff red herring a mile away. But then this movie has so many of them—including a hot-footed cop played by Anthony LaPaglia and a psychiatrist friend of Ann's played by Alan Alda—that [audiences] practically need a trawler to get through it." Hal Hinson of The Washington Post wrote, "What follows can't be described without spoiling the only thing the movie has going for it: its lethal, suspenseful punch. By the time it's delivered, though, you'll probably be laughing too hard to be scared."

On Rotten Tomatoes the film has an approval rating of 33% based on 9 reviews, with an average grade of 4.5 out of 10. Audiences polled by CinemaScore gave the film an average grade of "B" on an A+ to F scale. Alan Alda was nominated for a Golden Raspberry Award for Worst Supporting Actor at the 13th Golden Raspberry Awards.

=== Home media ===
Paramount Home Video released the film on VHS and an unrated version on LaserDisc on March 3, 1993 and on DVD in 2004. Shout! Factory released the film on Blu-ray on November 1, 2022.
