= Elizabeth Cheshire =

American actress

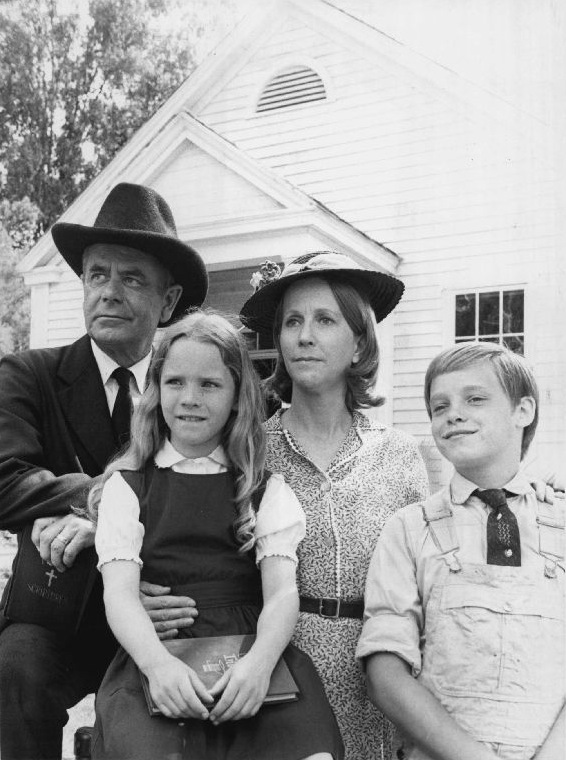
- (L–R) Glenn Ford, Elizabeth Cheshire, Julie Harris and Lance Kerwin in The Family Holvak (1975)
- Born: March 3, 1967 (age 59); Burbank, California, U.S.
- Occupation: Actress
- Years active: 1975–1989, 2008

Elizabeth Cheshire (born March 3, 1967) is an American actress known for appearing in the films as Airport '77 (1977), Looking for Mr. Goodbar (1977), Sunshine Christmas (1977), Melvin and Howard (1980) and Strange Behavior (1980), and television series such as The Family Holvak and Sunshine. Most of her credits were when she was a child actress or teenage actress.

Cheshire is the daughter of Jerry and Enid Cheshire, and she has three older sisters.

== Television appearances ==
- The Family Holvak (1975)
- Sunshine (1975)
- Captains and the Kings (1976)
- Highway to Heaven – Season 5, Episode 6: The Source

== Filmography ==
- Ark II (1976) – Nestra
- Looking for Mr. Goodbar (1977)
- Airport '77 (1977) – Bonnie Stern
- Sunshine Christmas (TV) (1977)
- And I Alone Survived (1978)
- Melvin and Howard (1980)
- The Awakening of Candra (1981)
- Fallen Angel (TV) (1981)
- Strange Behavior (1981)
- Moving Midway (2008)
