= Corey Fischer =

American actor (1945–2020)

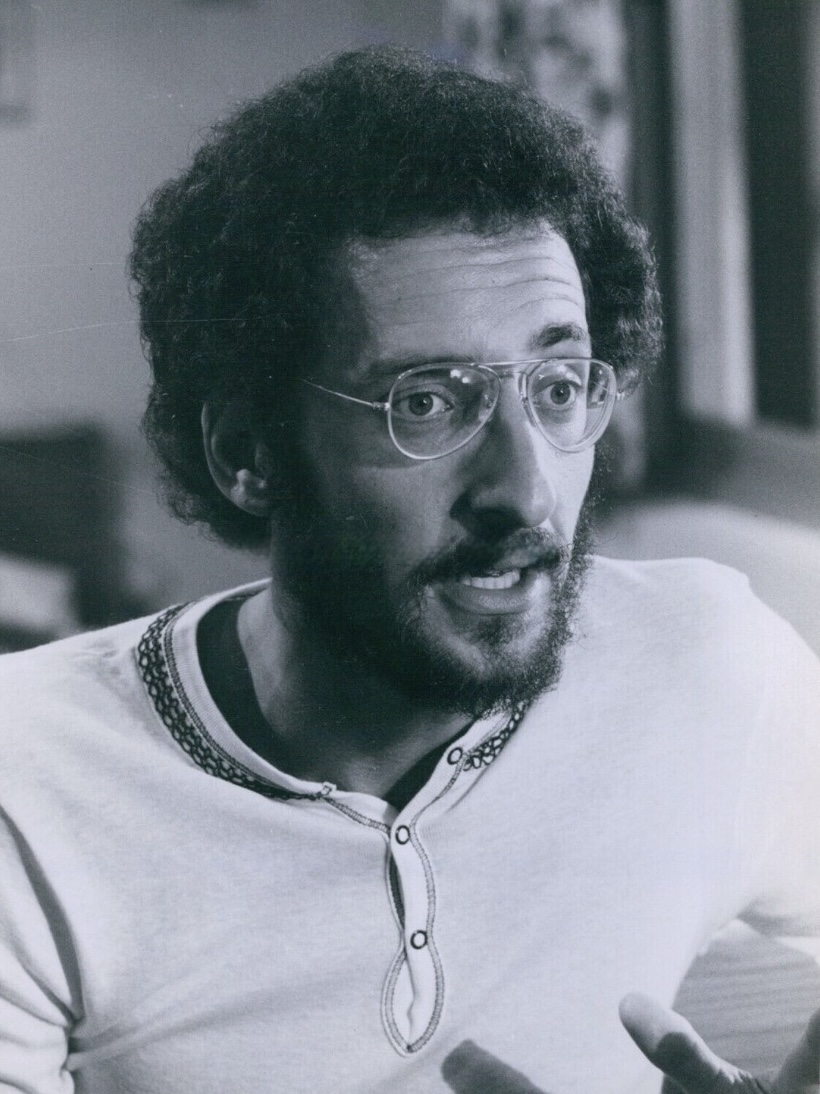
- Fischer in Sunshine, 1975
- Born: February 28, 1945; Los Angeles, California, U.S.
- Died: June 6, 2020 (aged 75); Hayward, California, U.S.
- Occupation: Actor
- Years active: 1967–2013

Corey John Fischer (February 28, 1945 – June 6, 2020) was an American actor.

== Early life and education ==
Fischer was born in Los Angeles, California to Jewish parents. He earned a Bachelor of Arts degree in French and Theatre Arts from UCLA.

== Career ==
In the mid-1960s, he worked in Los Angeles in improvisational theatre, notably with the committee, and went on to work in film and television. An early film appearance was in the biker cult film Naked Angels, and an early television appearance was in a 1966 episode of Daniel Boone.

Fischer appeared in Robert Altman's first three Hollywood movies: MASH, Brewster McCloud, and McCabe and Mrs. Miller and many of the best-known TV comedies of the 1970s, including All in the Family, Sanford and Son and Barney Miller as well as the TV version of M*A*S*H. In 1972–75 he played Givits, a guitar-playing ex-rabbinical student in Sunshine starting with the groundbreaking TV movie that became the prototype for a number of "Disease-of-the-Week" movies that followed. He continued to play Givits in the short-lived spin-off series, also titled Sunshine, (13 episodes) and, finally, a second TV movie, Sunshine Christmas.

In 1976 Fischer worked with LA's ProVisional Theatre, an experimental, political ensemble. With them, he toured nationally in America Piece by Susan Yankowitz and the company-created Voice of the People. He was then invited to become part of The Winter Project by director Joseph Chaikin. Relocating to New York for two years, he participated in Chaikin's project and acted in Chaikin's production of The Dybbuk at the Public Theater.

In 1978, he returned to Los Angeles, where, with Albert Greenberg and Naomi Newman, he co-founded Traveling Jewish Theatre (TJT), later known as The Jewish Theatre San Francisco. In 1982 TJT moved to San Francisco where Fischer continued to act, write and direct theatre and to act in film and television. He appeared in the 2012 feature film The Five-Year Engagement.

Fischer's one-man show Sometimes We Need a Story More Than Food was voted one of the ten best productions of 1993 by the Los Angeles Times and won a Marin County playwriting fellowship. His play See Under: Love, an adaptation of the novel by Israeli author David Grossman, was one of six winners of the Kennedy Center Fund for New American Plays Award in 1999. It was produced by TJT in 2001 and is anthologized in 9 Contemporary Jewish Plays (ISBN 9780292712904). In 2000, the San Francisco Bay Guardian voted him one of the year's best directors for God's Donkey, an original TJT production. In 2001, his play, See Under: Love was listed as one of the year's ten best plays by the San Francisco Chronicle and was nominated by the Association of American Drama Critics as Best Play of 2001.

His last work was as a playwright and director of In the Maze of Our Own Lives, a play inspired by the story of the Group Theatre which was produced in October 2011, to launch TJT's 34th season. This was TJT's last as a producing organization.

Fischer died on June 6, 2020, at age 75 from complications of a brain stem bleed (or brain aneurysm). He suffered the medical emergency on December 3, 2019, and passed away after a long rehabilitation process.

== Filmography ==
Year	Title	Role	Notes
1969	Naked Angels	Stash	
1970	M*A*S*H	Capt. Bandini	
1970	Brewster McCloud	Hines	
1971	Cactus in the Snow	Bartender	
1971	McCabe and Mrs. Miller	Mr. Elliott	
1972	All in the Family	Jeff Walker	
1973	M*A*S*H (TV series)	Capt. Phil Cardozo	
1975	Funny Lady	Conductor	
1975	Sanford and Son	Anthony Marvinowsky	"Steinberg and Son" episode)
1977	Quincy	Dr. Alan Castle	"Let Me Light the Way" episode
1978	Barney Miller	Jonathan Dodd	
1992	Final Analysis	Forensic Doctor	
2002	Frasier	Bar Mitzvah Officiating Rabbi	
2005	Bee Season	National Spelling Bee Pronouncer	
2006	Valley of the Heart's Delight	Frightened Man	
2012	The Five-Year Engagement	Male Justice of the Peace	
2013	Being Us	Franklin	(final film role)
