= Andersonville, West Virginia =

Unincorporated community in West Virginia, United States

Andersonville
- Unincorporated community
- Location within the state of West Virginia Andersonville (the United States)
- Coordinates: 39°46′48″N 80°31′18″W
- Country: United States
- State: West Virginia
- County: Marshall
- Elevation: 997 ft (304 m)
- Time zone: UTC-5 (Eastern (EST))
  - Summer (DST): UTC-4 (EDT)
- GNIS ID: 1553728

Andersonville is an unincorporated community in Marshall County, West Virginia, United States.
