= Christopher Crowe (screenwriter) =

American screenwriter and film director

Christopher Crowe (born August 1, 1948) is an American screenwriter, film producer, and film director.

Crowe was born in Racine, Wisconsin, and graduated from William Horlick High School in 1967. In the mid-1970s, he was working for an East Coast magazine, but returned home to Racine. While working at his father's graphic arts company, he created the logo for the band Cheap Trick.

He has written the screenplays for The Last of the Mohicans, Nightmares, The Mean Season, Fear, and The Bone Collector He also wrote and directed Off Limits and Whispers in the Dark.

He created the television shows Seven Days, The Watcher, The Untouchables, H.E.L.P., B.L. Stryker, and B. J. and the Bear. He was also executive producer of the 1985 TV revival of Alfred Hitchcock Presents.

Crowe had his identity stolen by Christian Gerhartsreiter, the man who also claimed to be a descendant of the Rockefeller family, in the early 1990s; Gerhartsreiter claimed he had been the producer of Alfred Hitchcock Presents at one point and had legally changed his name to Christopher C. Crowe.

== Filmography ==
=== Film ===
Year	Title	Director	Writer	Notes
1981	The Last Chase	No	Story	Credited as "C.R. O'Christopher"
1983	Nightmares	No	Yes	Also producer
1985	The Mean Season	No	Yes	Credited as Leon Piedmont
1988	Off Limits	Yes	Yes	
1992	Whispers in the Dark	Yes	Yes	
1992	The Last of the Mohicans	No	Yes	
1996	Fear	No	Yes	

=== Television ===
Year	Title	Director	Writer	Producer	Creator	Notes
1977	Baretta	No	Yes	No	No	3 episodes
1977–1979	The Hardy Boys/Nancy Drew Mysteries	No	Yes	Yes	No	32 episodes; Also story editor
1978–1979	Sword of Justice	No	Yes	Yes	No	5 episodes
1978–1981	B. J. and the Bear	No	Yes	Yes	Yes	47 episodes; Also supervising producer
1981–1982	Darkroom	No	Yes	Yes	No	14 episodes
1984	Airwolf	No	Yes	No	No	Episode "Echos From the Past"
1985–1986	Alfred Hitchcock Presents	Yes	Yes	Executive	No	Directed episodes "Prisoners" and "The Creeper"; Wrote segment "Bang! You're Dead!"; Also acted as "Surgeon" in episode "Night Fever"
1986	Miami Vice	Yes	No	No	No	Episode "Shadow in the Dark"
1989–1990	B.L. Stryker	No	Yes	No	Yes	12 episodes
1990	H.E.L.P.	Yes	No	Executive	Yes	
1993–1994	The Untouchables	No	Yes	Executive	Yes	42 episodes
1995	The Watcher	No	Yes	Executive	Yes	11 episodes
1998–2001	Seven Days	No	Yes	Executive	Yes	66 episodes
2001	Manhunt	No	No	Co-executive	No	6 episodes
2004–2005	NCIS	No	Yes	Consulting	No	2 episodes

Television films

Year	Title	Director	Writer	Executive producer
1985	Streets of Justice	Yes	Yes	Yes
1989	The Hollywood Detective	No	Yes	Co-executive
1992	Steel Justice	Yes	Yes	Yes
2004	Homeland Security	No	Yes	Yes
