= Richard Rust =

American television and film actor (1938–1994)

- Born: July 13, 1935; Boston Massachusetts, U.S.
- Died: November 9, 1994 (aged 56); Los Angeles, California, U.S.
- Education: University of Miami
- Occupation: Actor
- Years active: 1955–1988
- Children: Siegurd Rust

Richard Rust (July 13, 1935 – November 9, 1994) was an American actor of stage, television, and film.

== Early years ==
Born in Boston, Rust attended a Massachusetts boarding school and the University of Miami, where he was an archery champion. After majoring in drama at Miami, he enhanced his skills at the Neighborhood Playhouse.

== Stage ==
Rust first acted professionally in a 1951 production of The Milky Way at Southbury Playhouse in Connecticut.

== Television ==
Rust appeared in "The Rifleman", played Brice in the 1961 episode "Quiet Fear". He also acted in the "Perry Mason" episodes "The Case of the Startled Stallion" (1959) and "The Case of the Nervous Neighbor" (1964), and the "Gunsmoke" episodes "Kangaroo" (1959), and "Say Uncle" (1960). He also appeared in the "Lawman" series in 1959 in the episode "9:05 to North Platte". He played attorney Hank Tabor in the NBC series “Sam Benedict” (1962–63).

== Death ==
Rust died in Los Angeles on November 9, 1994, at the age of 59.

== Filmography ==
Year	Title	Role	Notes
1955	The Phenix City Story	Soldier	Uncredited
1959	Alfred Hitchcock Presents	Detective Charlie	S4:E23 "I'll Take Care of You"
1959	The Legend of Tom Dooley	Country Boy	
1959	Buckskin	Matthew Gower	S1:E29 "A Well of Gold"
1959	Lawman	Rood Jutes	S2:E10 "9:05 to North Platte"
1959	Law of the Plainsman	Healy	S1:E13 "Toll Road"
1959	Sugarfoot	Kirby Conway	S3:E8 "The Gaucho"
1959	The Man from Blackhawk	George Blackburn	S1:E1 "Logan's Policy"
1959	Rescue 8	Ronald Henshaw	S1:E28 "No Trespassing"
1959-64	Perry Mason	Charles Fuller/Peter White	2 episodes
1959-60	Black Saddle	Peck Martin/Frank Vardon	2 episodes
1959-60	Bourbon Street Beat	Brad Dennison/Kip Kiley	2 episodes
1959-60	Gunsmoke	Lee/Dal Spurlock/Weeb	3 episodes
1960	The Brothers Brannagan	Cecil	S1:E2 "An Hour to Kill"
1960	This Rebel Breed	Buck Madison	
1960	The Westerner	Deputy Tyson	S1:E2 "School Days"
1960	Bronco	Jack Crowley	S2:E19 "Winter Kill"
1960	The Untouchables	Len Carson	S1:E24 "The Doreen Maney Story"
1960	Johnny Ringo	Brad	S1:E26 "The Vindicator"
1960	Comanche Station	Dobie	
1960-61	77 Sunset Strip	Walter Legal/Race Shawn	2 episodes
1961	The Roaring 20's	Johnny Martin	S1:E16 "Black Saturday"
1961	Tales of Wells Fargo	Wally Lambert	S6:E14 "Trackback"
1961	Outlaws	Zim Kelly	S1:E24 "The Brothers"
1961	The Investigators	Martin Sterling	S1:E4 "I Thee Kill"
1960-62	Have Gun – Will Travel	various roles	3 episodes
1961	Underworld U.S.A.	Gus Cottahee	
1961	Homicidal	Jim Nesbitt	
1962	Walk on the Wild Side	Oliver	
1962	Taras Bulba	Captain Alex	
1962	The Rifleman	Bruce Hornsby	S4:E17 "The Quiet Fear"
1962-63	Sam Benedict	Henry/Hank Tabor	28 episodes
1963	Bonanza	Seth Pruitt	S5:E9 "The Quality of Mercy"
1963	The Littlest Hobo	Kevin	S1:E4 "Come Next Fall Session"
1963	The Lieutenant	Pvt. Steven Grace	S1:E3 "The Proud and the Angry"
1964-65	Another World	Dr. Tony Warren	9 episodes
1965	Profiles in Courage	Wendell Phillips/Ogden L. Mills	2 episodes
1966	Alvarez Kelly	Sergeant Hatcher	
1966	The Rat Patrol	Tex	S1:E8 "The Fatal Chase Raid"
1969	Naked Angels	Fingers	
1970	The Student Nurses	Les	
1971	The Last Movie	Pisco	
1971	Cade's County	Coley Baker	S1:E4 "Crisscross"
1972	The Mod Squad	Frank Devlin	S5:E6 "Eyes of the Beholder"
1973	Kid Blue	Train Robber #2	
1973	I Escaped from Devil's Island	Sergeant Zamorra	
1974	Get Christie Love!	Johnny Morris	S1:E8 "Fatal Image"
1975	Kate McShane	Actor	S1:E5 "Accounts Receivable"
1977	The Great Gundown	Joe Riles	
1988	Colors	Hearing Officer	
1988	Daddy's Boys	Construction Worker	
1988	Double Revenge	Sheriff Blanchfield	
