= Lucille Has Messed My Mind Up =

1969 album by Jeff Simmons

Studio album by Jeff Simmons
- Released: 1969
- Recorded: 1969
- Genre: Blues rock; psychedelic; pop
- Label: Straight
- Producer: Frank Zappa

Jeff Simmons chronology
Naked Angels (Soundtrack) (1969)	Lucille Has Messed My Mind Up (1969)	Blue Universe (2004)

Lucille Has Messed My Mind Up is the debut album of American musician Jeff Simmons. Released in 1969, the album was produced by Frank Zappa, who wrote two songs for the album under the pseudonym "La Marr Bruister". The album features musicians Craig Tarwater and John Kehlior, both of whom had previously been members of the Seattle group The Daily Flash.

Lucille Has Messed My Mind Up was described as the second best album on the Straight Records label by Mojo Magazine. In 2007, it was re-issued on CD by World In Sound Records. The producer, Frank Zappa, would later cover two songs from Lucille Has Messed My Mind Up; "Wonderful Wino" on Zoot Allures and the title track, "Lucille Has Messed My Mind Up" on Joe's Garage.

== Tracks ==
Side 1
No.	Title	Writer(s)	Length
1.	"Appian Way"	Jeff Simmons	2:32
2.	"Zondo Zondo"	Simmons	1:50
3.	"Madame Du Barry"	Simmons	2:42
4.	"I'm in the Music Business"	Simmons	4:02
5.	"Lucille Has Messed My Mind Up"	La Marr Bruister	3:14

Side 2
No.	Title	Writer(s)	Length
6.	"Raye"	Simmons	4:43
7.	"Wonderful Wino"	Bruister, Simmons	2:54
8.	"Tigres"	Simmons	3:13
9.	"Aqueous Humore"	Simmons	3:25
10.	"Conversations with a Recluse"	Simmons	3:50

== Personnel ==
- Jeff Simmons - bass, vocals, piano, organ, accordion, guitar
- Ian Underwood - saxophone
- Craig Tarwater - guitar
- Frank Zappa - guitar (5, 6)
- Ron Woods - drums, tambourine, maracas
- John Kehlior - drums (5, 6)
