= Glen Mason (singer) =

Scottish singer (1930–2014)

- Compilation album cover, 2013

Background information
- Born: Thomas Lennon; 16 September 1930; Stirling, Scotland
- Died: 25 August 2014 (aged 83) Kingston-upon-Thames, London, England
- Genres: Popular music
- Occupation: Singer
- Years active: 1951-
- Labels: Philips, Parlophone

Glen Mason (born Thomas Lennon; 16 September 1930 – 25 August 2014) was a Scottish-born singer of popular music.

== Career ==
Glen Mason was born in Stirling, Scotland, UK, on 16 September 1930.

After three years in the mines, Mason spent eleven months at the Forth Vale Rubber Works, six months in the Army and fifteen months with a dry-cleaning firm. He appeared on the stage for the first time in a local amateur revue, The Shipmates, singing "You Made Me Love You".

In the spring of 1951, he was offered his first professional engagement, with a three-month summer show at St. Andrews. After that, Glen had several appearances at Scottish theatres and in 1952 sang in another summer show at Montrose, also doing Sunday-night concerts in Arbroath. He headed next to London where, after some months, got a job in cabaret and sang for two weeks at the Churchill Club. Norman Newell, manager for the Philips recording company noticed Mason and after an audition recorded Mason's first two tracks, "The Whistling Kettle and the Dancing Cat" and "Dixieland Tango". Mason introduced him to producer George Martin, and Martin made the Scottish singer "sound American" in his versions of U.S. hits "Glendora" and "Green Door".

They were amply advertised ("Glendora" was described as a record that "really rocks") but, competing with the Perry Como and Jim Lowe originals, they failed to chart, with "Green Door" peaking at number 24.

Mason later appeared many times on radio and TV, in shows such as Mid-day Music Hall and Variety Parade. In 1960, he appeared, along with Jack Jackson and Jackson's son Malcolm, in the Michael Winner-directed musical-variety film Climb Up the Wall, and worked with Winner again on his 1962 films Behave Yourself and The Cool Mikado.

Mason came third in a national competition to represent the United Kingdom in Eurovision in 1959.

== Personal life and death ==
In old age, Mason stayed in the Southborough Nursing Home, Surrey, where he was often entertained by young musicians whose repertoire included Mason songs. He died from natural causes on 25 August 2014 in Kingston-upon-Thames, London, aged 83.
