= Climb Up the Wall =

1960 British film by Michael Winner

- Theatrical release poster
- Directed by: Michael Winner
- Written by: Jack Jackson; Michael Winner
- Produced by: Olive Negus-Fancey
- Starring: Jack Jackson; Glen Mason; Russ Conway
- Cinematography: Richard Bailey; Alfred Burger
- Edited by: Peter Austen-Hunt
- Production company: Border Film Productions
- Distributed by: New Realm Pictures
- Release date: 1960
- Running time: 65 minutes
- Country: United Kingdom
- Language: English

Climb Up the Wall is a 1960 British second feature comedy/music variety film directed by Michael Winner and introduced by Jack Jackson, featuring acts including Glen Mason, Russ Conway and Craig Douglas. It was written by Winner and Jackson.

== Synopsis ==
Radio and TV personality Jack Jackson introduces a selection of sketches and musical items, linked by his demonstration of a fantastical computer with display screen. Acts include Glen Mason, Craig Douglas, Russ Conway and archive footage including excerpts from the 1952 film Down Among the Z Men. The film also features location shooting of London nightlife, and uncredited appearances by Peter Sellers and Michael Bentine.

== Cast ==
- Jack Jackson
- Glen Mason
- Russ Conway
- Craig Douglas
- Mike Preston
- Cherry Wainer
- Libby Morris
- Malcolm Jackson
- Tommy Yeardye
- Don Storer
- Neville Taylor
- Aleta Morrison
- George 'Calypso' Browne
- Rahnee Motie
- Peter Sellers
- Michael Bentine
- Antonio
- Frances Day
- Claude Dampier

== Critical reception ==
The Monthly Film Bulletin wrote: "This extravaganza is so chaotic and inconsequential in construction and presentation that it is almost surrealist, with Jack Jackson and his son Malcolm clowning around rather abysmally in between presenting clips from old films (to introduce Charlie Kunz and Frances Day, for example), cabaret artistes (including an Indian female fire-eater), and a handful of crooners and rock'n'rollers, concluding with a "beat" session. Fans of Jack Jackson's style of radio disc-jockeying may find his fooling and patter to their taste, but the humour is decidedly poverty-stricken – for example, "What's this fly doing in my drink?" ... "The breast stroke, by the look of it!" The sole redeeming feature is a guest appearance by Peter Sellers in an all too brief sketch, parodying the American military."

== Home media ==
The film was released on DVD in 2015 by Renown Films, accompanied by London Entertains (1951) and Calling All Cars (1954).
