= Mike and Bernie Winters =

British comedic duo

Mike Winters Bernie Winters
- Born: 15 November 1926 (Mike Winters); 6 September 1930 (Bernie Winters); Islington, London, England
- Died: 24 August 2013 (aged 86) (Mike Winters); 4 May 1991 (aged 60) (Bernie Winters); Gloucestershire, England (Mike Winters); London, England (Bernie Winters)
- Occupation: Comedians

Mike and Bernie Winters were an English comedy double act, consisting of brothers Mike Winters, born Michael Weinstein (15 November 1926 – 24 August 2013) and Bernie Winters, born Bernard Weinstein (6 September 1930 – 4 May 1991). The act was very popular in the United Kingdom from the mid-1950s to the early 1970s.

== Early life ==
The Winters brothers were born in Islington. One of their grandfathers, who had arrived in Britain from Russia aged 16, ran a restaurant in Parfett Street, Whitechapel. Samuel, Mike and Bernie's father, was a boxer and gambler; their mother, Rachel, came from a circus family. In an interview posted on YouTube, Mike Winters says that Rachel's brothers were champion boxers Jack Bloomfield and Joe Bloomfield.

When Bernie was three, the Weinstein family moved to a house in Tottenham, across the road from George Marks, who later became Harrison Marks, the glamour photographer. Mike recalled that it was with George that he mounted his first 'promotion'. "We would dress up in whatever clothes we had managed to scrounge from our parents and put on shows in our garden." (pp17 Shake a Pagoda Tree W.H. Allen 1976)). Bernie's friend was Danny Sewell, younger brother of George who went on to star in such shows as Special Branch and UFO. Danny was the local heavy and used to look after Bernie. "If anybody said anything nasty to me, he (Danny) hit them."

Mike won a scholarship to Tottenham Grammar School but was evacuated to Wiltshire with his younger brother where he eventually ended up at the City of Oxford High School for Boys. At 15 Mike won a scholarship and grant to the Royal Academy of Music to study clarinet, where he was one of the founders of the Royal Academy of Music Jazz Quintet. Bernie moved along the apprenticeship route, getting a job at the Regency Club in London's Soho where he played the ukulele and performed as a comedian.

During World War II, Mike, underage, was in the Merchant Navy. Following a medical discharge he enlisted in the Canadian Legion as a musician and after a year was promoted to the honorary rank of captain. Bernie served alongside Mike as a drummer in the Canadian Legion. After the war, Bernie took drumming lessons at the London Palladium and Mike, who had studied clarinet at the Academy, formed a double act playing musical items and doing impressions.

Shortly after being discharged, the pair won a talent contest held in Manchester. They won the first prize which was a one-week tour of variety theatres. Despite changing their stage name to the Winters brothers, they were not successful at first, and went their separate ways for a time. The pair got back together in the form of a three-handed act called The Three Loose Screws where they learnt to dance and improve their skills.

== Double act ==
On 25 June 1955, Mike and Bernie made their first television appearance. This was on the BBC show Variety Parade, which was a great hit. The brothers stayed with the show until 1958. Their next move, secured by their agent Joe Collins (father of Joan Collins and Jackie Collins), was to the ATV show Sunday Night at the London Palladium, which at the time was the most important variety show on UK television. Due to their popularity they were invited to appear before Queen Elizabeth II at the 1962 Royal Variety Show. In 1963 they starred alongside Frankie Howerd and Tommy Cooper in the Michael Winner film The Cool Mikado. By 1965, their act was a great success, thanks in part to the ABC shows Big Night Out and its follow-up, Blackpool Night Out. Features of their act were that Mike would appear on stage first, often playing the clarinet. Bernie would then poke his head through a curtain and say "Eeeeh!", followed by him pulling Mike's cheeks and calling him "choochy-face". Bernie also had the cheery catchphrase "I'll smash yer face in".

In appearance, Mike was slightly built and sharply dressed, whilst Bernie was larger and displayed his slightly protruding front teeth to produce a mildly gormless and 'goofy' look.

The brothers were rewarded with their own show that ran from 1965 to 1973. On Mothering Sunday, 24 March 1974, they again appeared on Sunday Night at the London Palladium. The following year they appeared as guest stars on The Peters and Lee Story on ATV on 27 December 1975. The BBC TV series The Story of Light Entertainment reported that Bernie had had a long-running affair with a dancer 20 years his junior, Dinah May, and that caused friction between the brothers. They finally broke up in 1978.

== Solo careers ==
Mike moved to Florida because his wife, Cassie Winters, suffered from arthritis and Bernie went solo in the UK, signing a contract with Thames Television. Bernie's biggest success was his eponymous series where his comedy "partner" was a St Bernard dog named Schnorbitz. Bernie Winters owned and trained Schnorbitz, and the dog played a major part in his later career.

In 1987, Bernie hosted a quiz show on HTV called Scribble. He also presented a UK version of Make Me Laugh, a Tyne Tees Television production for ITV. The show launched the comedy career of Brian Conley. He was also one of the hosts of the long running ITV show Whose Baby?, taking over from Leslie Crowther in the mid-1980s.

In the mid-1980s, the brothers finally made peace with each other, but they never worked together again. Bernie Winters died on 4 May 1991, aged 60, from stomach cancer.

Mike opened the first theatre club in Miami and worked with boxing manager Angelo Dundee, presenting black-tie boxing events. Mike was also active in charity work, with visits to Miami from Muhammad Ali, Prince Michael of Kent and Prince Edward and was awarded the city of Miami keys by the mayor. With Jude Parry, Mike also co-produced, directed, performed in and wrote the first British professional pantomime to appear in Florida, continuing to do so for five years. Davy Jones of the Monkees appeared. He published five books: a biography of Angelo Dundee, and The Axis of Greatness about the relationship between Angelo and his boxers Sugar Ray Leonard and Ali. He also wrote two novels, Miami One Way and Razor Sharp. His final book was a light-hearted memoir, The Sunny Side of Winters. He finally moved to Fairford, Gloucestershire, with his wife of 57 years. He died from pancreatic cancer on 24 August 2013, aged 86.
