= The Cool Mikado =

1963 British film by Michael Winner

- Theatrical release poster
- Directed by: Michael Winner
- Written by: Michael Winner
- Based on: adaptation Maurice Browning operetta The Mikado; W. S. Gilbert
- Produced by: Harold Baim
- Starring: Frankie Howerd; Stubby Kaye; Dennis Price
- Cinematography: Dennis Ayling; Martin Curtis
- Edited by: Frank Gilpin
- Music by: John Barry (music arranger); Martin Slavin (music arranger)
- Production companies: Gilbert & Sullivan Operas
- Distributed by: United Artists
- Release date: 19 May 1963
- Running time: 81 minutes
- Country: United Kingdom
- Language: English

The Cool Mikado is a British musical film released in 1963, directed by Michael Winner and starring Frankie Howerd, Lionel Blair and Stubby Kaye. It was produced by Harold Baim, with music arranged by Martin Slavin and John Barry. The script was written by Winner from an adaptation by Maurice Browning.

== Plot ==
Based on the 1885 Gilbert and Sullivan comic opera The Mikado, the plot is reset into contemporary Japan as a comic gangster story. The dialogue is largely rewritten, and several of the well-known musical items are omitted. The music that remains is re-orchestrated into styles popular in the early 1960s, including the twist, and the Cha-Cha-Cha.

Hank, the son of American judge Herbert Mikado, refuses to marry Katie Shaw, whom his father wishes him to marry, and so joins the army. He is stationed in Japan where he falls in love with a Tokyo art student, Yum-Yum. However, her fiancé, Ko-Ko, an American gangster operating in Japan, is determined to keep Hank and Yum-Yum apart. Hank's father had also sentenced Ko-Ko's brother to prison.

== Cast ==
- Frankie Howerd as Ko-Ko Flintridge
- Stubby Kaye as Judge Herbert Mikado / Charlie Hotfleisch
- Mike Winters as Mike
- Bernie Winters as Bernie
- Tommy Cooper as Pooh-Bah, private detective
- Dennis Price as Ronald Fortescue
- Peter Barkworth as Fanshaw
- Jacqueline Jones as Katie Shaw
- Kevin Scott as Hank Mikado
- Jill Mai Meredith as Yum-Yum
- Burt Kwouk as Art School teacher
- Lionel Blair as Nanki
- Pete Murray as man #1 in boudoir
- Ed Bishop as man #2 in boudoir
- Tsai Chin as Pitti-Sing
- Glen Mason as Harry
- Dermot Walsh as Elmer
- Carole Shelley as Mrs. Smith
- C. Denier Warren as Mr. Smith
- Yvonne Shima as Peep-Bo
- Kenji Takaki as Ho Ho
- The John Barry Seven as themselves
- Michael WInner as airline passenger

== Production ==
In May 1958, The New York Times reported that Don Walker was working on an updated version of The Mikado called The Cool Mikado. Harry Squires was to produce. Walker then became committed to the musical First Impressions meaning Cool Mikado was postponed.

Producer Harold Baim decided to make a film of The Cool Mikado. He said the 1936 version of the original operetta "didn't make a bean" so was keen to update it. He hired Martin Slavin to redo the music. The director was Michael Winner who said "we have taken what is lasting in The Mikado and firmly junked the rest."

The film was shot at Shepperton Studios in July 1962. Bernie Winters says his scenes took three days "and I spent most of that time trying to keep Mike from punching the director."

Filmed entirely on a sound stage, stock footage was used to provide Japanese atmosphere between scenes. This footage looks like one of the many travelogues for which producer Baim is best known, but according to Winner's autobiography this footage was specially shot. Winner credits the film's problems to the fact it was underfunded. The colourful sparsely dressed sets, not always tending towards realism, give the film a surreal quality.

Bain hoped to follow it with versions of The Gondoliers and Pirates of Penzance.

Winner told the Los Angeles Times in 1970 that the experience prompted him to start initiating his own material, so he hired a writer to write The System which was his breakthrough film.

Frankie Howerd told Barry Took in 1992 the film "had the appearance of being made in a wind tunnel. Nobody could make any sense of it and I can say without equivocation that not only was it the worst film ever made but the one production in showbusiness I'm positively ashamed to have appeared in... it was absolutely incomprehensible gibberish." Howerd added: "That was the worst film I've ever done. I'd say it was one of the worst films ever made. It was shot in a month and I was in it for two weeks. I didn't get much money for it. But I needed the money at that time because I wasn't doing very well. Also, I hadn't done a film for some time. It was a good idea had it been done properly. All sorts of people were in it such as Tommy Cooper, Pete Murray, Mike and Bernie Winters and it should have been much better than it was. But the script was appalling. It made no sense because if you've got no script, you've got nothing because the script is everything."

== Music ==
The following music and styles appear in the film. Except for the ‘Mikado’s Song’, containing some topical lines, lyrics are unchanged. Although heavily re-orchestrated, the melodies were left essentially intact.

- "The Sun and I" – instrumental twist used for the opening credits
- "We are Gentlemen of Japan" – male chorus in a ‘Tijuana brass’ type setting
- "Bellow of the Blast" – featured instrumental played in the style of a ‘strip’ tune
- "Three Little Maids" – female trio, set as a Cha-Cha-Cha followed by a featured dance
- "Overture extract" – a twist and used as incidental music
- "The Sun and I" – female solo
- "A Wandering Minstrel" – male solo in a crooner style
- "Lord High Executioner" – chorus with a ‘Tijuana brass’ backing
- "Finale Act 1" – extract set in a jazzy style and used as a short dance routine
- "The Sun and I" – instrumental twist used as incidental music
- "Here’s a Howdy do" – duet sung as a Cha-Cha-Cha
- "A Wandering Minstrel" – instrumental small jazz combo arrangement used as incidental music
- "This I’ll Never Do" – duet
- Overture extract" – instrumental quickstep
- "Tit Willow" – instrumental twist, a featured dance routine
- Overture extract" – instrumental in a jazz style
- "The Mikado’s Song" – male solo, some updated lyrics
- "Bellow of the Blast" – instrumental jitterbug used as incidental music
- "Flowers that bloom in the Spring" – various solos, set as a jitterbug and a featured dance performed in a snow storm
- "We are Gentlemen of Japan" – played on bagpipes
- "He’s Gone and Married Yum Yum" – chorus in a jazzy style.

== Reception ==
The Monthly Film Bulletin wrote: "Thoroughly slapdash in conception and execution, this shoddy film contains some enjoyable dancing by Lionel Blair, but little else. No attempt seems to have been made to think out what was being attempted in re-hashing Gilbert and Sullivan, the plot is perfunctory, and irrelevant episodes are intercut with travelogue shots of Tokyo which only emphasise still more the artificiality and witlessness of the main action."

Andrew Roberts in The Independent in 2013 wrote: "Who else but Winner could have directed a musical containing the rousing number 'Tit Willow Twist', as played by the John Barry Seven and as interpreted by Lionel Blair and His Dancers? To this day, Winner's bold attempt to combine Gilbert and Sullivan with the comic talents of Mike and Bernie Winters stands as a prime example of how British cinema can, occasionally but always memorably, produce films that are the celluloid equivalent of those relatives who are only wheeled out at family weddings, and who are then studiously avoided at the reception."
