= Michael Winner =

British filmmaker (1935–2013)

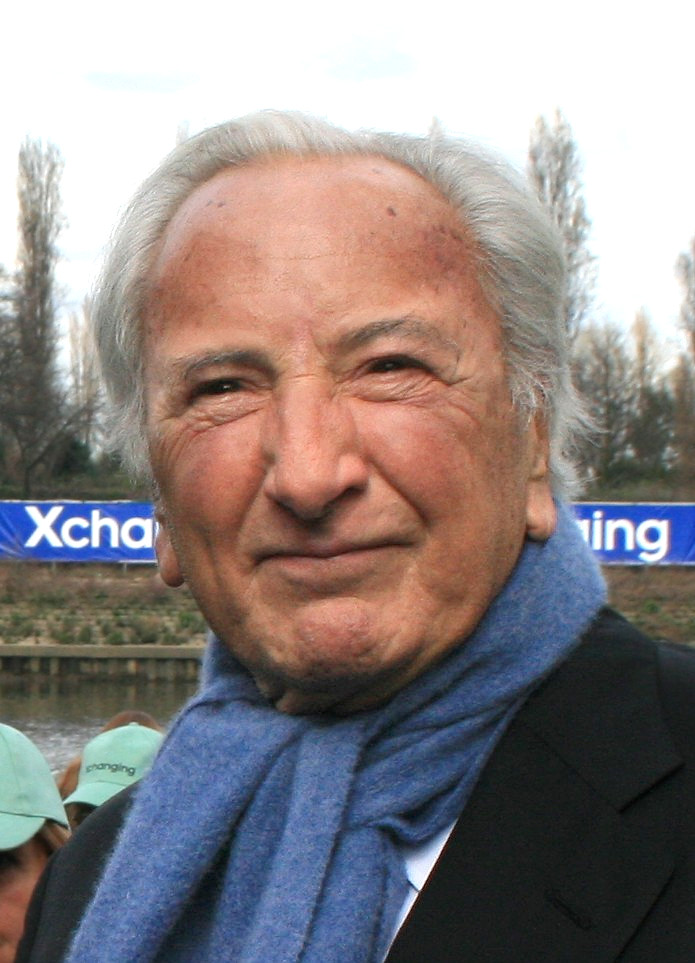
- Winner in 2010
- Born: Michael Robert Winner; 30 October 1935; Hampstead, London, England
- Died: 21 January 2013 (aged 77); Kensington, London, England
- Resting place: Willesden Jewish Cemetery
- Other name: Arnold Crust
- Education: Downing College, Cambridge
- Occupations: Film director, producer, screenwriter, editor
- Years active: 1955–2013
- Spouse: Geraldine Lynton-Edwards (m. 2011)

Michael Robert Winner (30 October 1935 – 21 January 2013) was a British filmmaker. He is known for directing numerous action, thriller, and black comedy films in the 1960s, 1970s and 1980s, including several collaborations with actors Oliver Reed and Charles Bronson.

Winner's best-known works include Death Wish (1974) and its first two sequels Death Wish II (1982) and Death Wish 3 (1985), the World War II comedy Hannibal Brooks (1969), the hitman thriller The Mechanic (1972), the supernatural horror film The Sentinel (1977), the neo-noir The Big Sleep (1978), the satirical comedy Won Ton Ton, the Dog Who Saved Hollywood (1976), and the Revisionist Westerns Lawman (1971) and Chato's Land (1972).

Winner was known as a media personality in the United Kingdom, appearing regularly on television talk programmes and publishing a restaurant review column for The Sunday Times. He was also a founder of the Police Memorial Trust.

== Early life and education ==
Winner was born at 40 Belsize Grove, Belsize Park, Hampstead, London, the only child of Jewish parents George Joseph Winner (1910–1975), of Russian-Jewish origin, and Helen (née Zlota; January 1906 – May 1984), who was born in Poland. His mother had emigrated to the UK in 1932 with her parents and a brother, and later anglicised her name from ‘Chana Rosa’ to ‘Helen Rose’. His father—who was a Freemason and belonged to the same Masonic Lodge as Tommy Cooper— was a businessman and company director responsible for running a branch of the Winner's clothing chain founded by his father, who became a naturalised British citizen in 1910. His mother died at the age of 78, in 1984.

Winner was educated at St Christopher School, Letchworth, and Downing College, Cambridge, where he read law and economics. He also edited the university's student newspaper, Varsity, and was the youngest ever editor up to that time, both in age and in terms of his university career (being only in the second term of his second year). Winner had earlier written a newspaper column, "Michael Winner's Showbiz Gossip", in the Kensington Post from the age of fourteen. The first issue of Showgirl Glamour Revue in 1955 had him writing another film and show-business gossip column, "Winner's World". Such jobs allowed him to meet and interview several leading film personalities, including James Stewart and Marlene Dietrich. He also wrote for the New Musical Express.

Winner claimed in his memoirs that he avoided National Service by pretending to be a homosexual.

== Career ==
=== Shorts ===
Winner directed his first travelogue, This is Belgium (1957), which was largely shot on location in East Grinstead. It was financed by his father. Later, he wrote, produced and directed a short, The Square (1957), starring A. E. Matthews, and which again was financed by Winner's father.

Winner's first on-screen feature credit was earned as a writer for the low-budget crime film Man with a Gun (1958) directed by Montgomery Tully. He went on to direct the shorts Danger, Women at Work (1959) and Watch the Birdie (1959), and was Associate Producer on Floating Fortress (1959), produced by Harold Baim.

=== Early British feature films ===
Winner's first feature as director was Shoot to Kill (1960), which he also wrote. Dermot Walsh starred. He followed this with Climb Up the Wall (1960), which was essentially a series of music acts presented by Jack Jackson, but which Winner nonetheless wrote and directed.

Winner's third feature as director was the thriller Murder on the Campus (1961), also known as Out of the Shadow, which Winner also wrote and helped produce. Dermot Walsh starred once again, together with Terence Longdon. Shortly afterwards, Winner wrote and directed the short Girls Girls Girls! (1961) which was narrated by Jackson, and directed the short feature Old Mac (1961), written by Richard Aubrey and starring Charles Lamb, Vi Stevens and Tania Mallet.

Winner directed the shorts Haunted England (1961), It's Magic (1962), and Behave Yourself (1962), the latter of which was based on Emily Post's Book of Manners, and whose cast included Jackson and Dennis Price.

Winner achieved success with a musical he directed, Play It Cool (1962), starring Billy Fury and Michael Anderson Jr., and which was distributed by Anglo-Amalgamated.

Winner's next feature, Some Like It Cool (1962), is the tale of a young woman who introduces her prudish husband and in-laws to the joys of nudism. Filmed at Longleat, Winner was afraid the sight of bare flesh would offend the magistrate for the area, so he confided his worries to the landowner, the Marquess of Bath. 'Don't worry,' said the Marquess, 'I am the local magistrate.' The film cost £9,000 and Winner said it made its money back in a week.

Winner went on to update Gilbert and Sullivan, writing the screenplay and directing a version of The Mikado titled The Cool Mikado (1963), starring Frankie Howerd and Stubby Kaye and which was produced by Harold Baim.

Winner's first significant project was West 11 (1963), a realistic tale of London drifters starring Alfred Lynch, Eric Portman and Diana Dors, and which was based on an adaptation by Hall and Waterhouse of Laura Del-Rivo's novel The Furnished Room (1961).

=== Oliver Reed ===
Winner's film The System (1964), also known as The Girl-Getters, began a partnership with actor Oliver Reed that would last for six films over a 25-year period, and was based on a script by Peter Draper. Winner would later receive an offer from Columbia to direct a comedy, You Must Be Joking! (1965). It starred American actor Michael Callan and a supporting cast that included Lionel Jeffries and Denholm Elliott, while Winner also wrote the script.

Winner was reunited with Reed on The Jokers (1967), a comedy where Reed was teamed with Michael Crawford. It was based on a script by Dick Clement and Ian La Frenais from a story by Winner for his own company, Scimitar Films Limited (for Universal's English operations, then under Jay Kanter). The resulting movie was a popular hit.

Winner and Reed then made the comedy-drama I'll Never Forget What's'isname (1967), co-starring Orson Welles, Carol White and Harry Andrews, also for Scimitar. Draper wrote the script, which was a spoof of the advertising world, and the film was also done for Universal.

Winner did some uncredited directing on A Little of What You Fancy (1967), a documentary about the history of the British music hall. Then he and Reed made their fourth feature together, the World War II satire Hannibal Brooks (1969), again from a Clement/La Frenais script and based on a story by Winner.

In 1970, Winner directed The Games for 20th Century Fox, the film is about the Olympic Games and which starred Ryan O'Neal and Stanley Baker, with script by Erich Segal.

=== Early American films ===
Hannibal Brooks drew notice in Hollywood, and Winner soon received an opportunity to direct his first American film, for United Artists; this was Lawman (1971), a Western starring Burt Lancaster and Robert Duvall, and for which Gerald Wilson was the writer.

Back in England, Winner directed Marlon Brando in The Nightcomers (1971), a prequel to The Turn of the Screw by Henry James, the first of many films for which Winner was credited as editor using the pseudonym 'Arnold Crust'.

=== Charles Bronson ===
Winner edited, produced and directed Chato's Land (1972), recounting a mixed race native American fighting with white people. It starred Charles Bronson and was made for Scimitar through United Artists. Once more, Gerald Wilson wrote the script. Winner's second film for Bronson and United Artists was The Mechanic (1972), a thriller in which professional assassins are depicted. It was based on a story and script by Lewis John Carlino and Winner also edited, although he did not produce; he replaced Monte Hellman as director.

The following year, Winner cast Lancaster again in the espionage drama Scorpio (1973), co-starring Alain Delon and made for Scimitar and United Artists. Winner also produced and directed a third film with Bronson, The Stone Killer (1973), for Columbia and in collaboration with producer Dino De Laurentiis.

==== Death Wish ====
Winner and Bronson collaborated on Death Wish (1974), a film that defined the subsequent careers of both men. Based on a novel by Brian Garfield and adapted for the screen by Wendell Mayes, Death Wish was originally planned for director Sidney Lumet, under contract with United Artists. The commitment of Lumet to another film and UA's questioning of its subject matter, led to the film's eventual production by De Laurentiis through Paramount Pictures. Death Wish follows Paul Kersey, a liberal New York architect who becomes a gun-wielding vigilante after his wife is murdered and daughter is raped. With a script adjusted to Bronson's persona, the film generated controversy during its screenings but was one of the year's highest grossers.

=== Non-Bronson period ===
Winner tried to break out of action films with Won Ton Ton, the Dog Who Saved Hollywood (1976), an animal comedy Winner produced and directed, starring Bruce Dern, Madeline Kahn, Art Carney, and Milton Berle. Intended as a satire of Hollywood, it was a financial failure. Of modest success was his horror film The Sentinel (1977), which Winner wrote, produced and directed for Universal, and which was based on the novel by Jeffrey Konvitz.

Winner then wrote, produced and directed the remake of Raymond Chandler's novel The Big Sleep (1978), starring Robert Mitchum as Philip Marlowe with a strong support cast including John Mills, Sarah Miles, Richard Boone and Candy Clarke. The film was relocated to England, and financed by ITC Films. Also for ITC, Winner produced, edited and directed the organised crime thriller Firepower (1979). It was meant to star Bronson, who withdrew, and wound up starring Sophia Loren and James Coburn.

=== Reunion with Bronson/Cannon Films ===
By the early 1980s, Winner found himself in great need of a successful film and accepted Charles Bronson's request to film Death Wish II (1981), a sequel to the 1974 hit. Bronson had already signed a lucrative deal with Cannon Films, independent producer of exploitation fare and marginal art house titles. The sequel, co-starring Bronson's wife Jill Ireland, considerably increased the violence to more graphic levels. Winner said the film was 'the same, but different', to the original. 'That's what sequels are – Rocky II, Rocky III – you don't see Sylvester Stallone move to the Congo and become a nurse. Here the look of LA is what's different. Besides – rape doesn't date!' Death Wish II made a $2 million profit for Cannon films and made an extra $29 million worldwide.

The success of Death Wish II enabled Winner to raise money from Cannon for a dream project: a 1983 remake of 1945's The Wicked Lady, this time starring Faye Dunaway and which Winner wrote, produced and directed.

For Miracle Films, Winner produced and directed the thriller Scream for Help (1984). He also produced the film Claudia (1985), doing some uncredited directing and editing.

Winner was reunited with Bronson and Cannon for Death Wish 3 (1985), which – although set in New York City – was mostly filmed in London for budgetary reasons. Winner produced and edited."

Winner was also attached to direct Cannon's 1990 film Captain America, from a script by James Silke, which he would revise with Stan Hey, and then Stan Lee and Lawrence Block. By 1987, however, Winner was off the project.

Winner's final film for Cannon was an adaptation of the Agatha Christie novel Appointment with Death (1989) starring Peter Ustinov as Poirot. Winner produced, edited and directed; but despite a strong support cast including Lauren Bacall and Carrie Fisher, the film flopped.

=== Final British films ===
After Cannon Films entered bankruptcy, Winner confined himself to British productions. He produced and directed an adaptation of the Alan Ayckbourn musical play A Chorus of Disapproval (1989) with Anthony Hopkins, and also wrote the script with Ayckbourn.

Winner produced, directed and edited the Michael Caine and Roger Moore farce Bullseye! (1990), based on a story by Winner. The film's reception was generally poor, with the film being described as "appallingly unfunny" in The Radio Times Guide to Films. Later, he wrote, produced and directed Dirty Weekend (1993), starring Lia Williams; and hosted the television series True Crimes, which was cancelled in 1994.

In 1994, Winner appeared as a guest artist – alongside Joan Collins, Christopher Biggins and Marc Sinden (who in 1983 had appeared in Winner's The Wicked Lady) – in Steven Berkoff's film version of his own play Decadence.

Winner's final film as director was Parting Shots (1999), which he also wrote, produced and edited. The film was critically reviled and flopped commercially.

== Other media activity ==
Winner was a regular panellist on BBC Radio 4's Any Questions, and later appeared on television programmes including BBC1's Question Time and BBC2's Have I Got News for You. He was also an occasional columnist for the Daily Mail throughout the 2000s, and an honorary member of BAFTA and of the Directors Guild of Great Britain. His autobiography Winner Takes All: A Life of Sorts was published by Robson Books in 2006, it largely describes his experiences with many big-screen actors. Winner also wrote a dieting book, The Fat Pig Diet Book.

Winner also featured in television commercials that he himself directed for insurance company esure between 2002 and 2009, with his trademark catchphrase "Calm down, dear! It's just a commercial!".

He was the subject of This Is Your Life in 2001 when he was surprised by Michael Aspel while dining with friends at a central London restaurant.

Winner appeared in the first series of The Apprentice UK. He agreed to participate in a charity auction, offering dinner for four and two bottles of house wine at "London's most difficult restaurant to get in," The Ivy. The experience sold for £2,600.

== Personal life ==
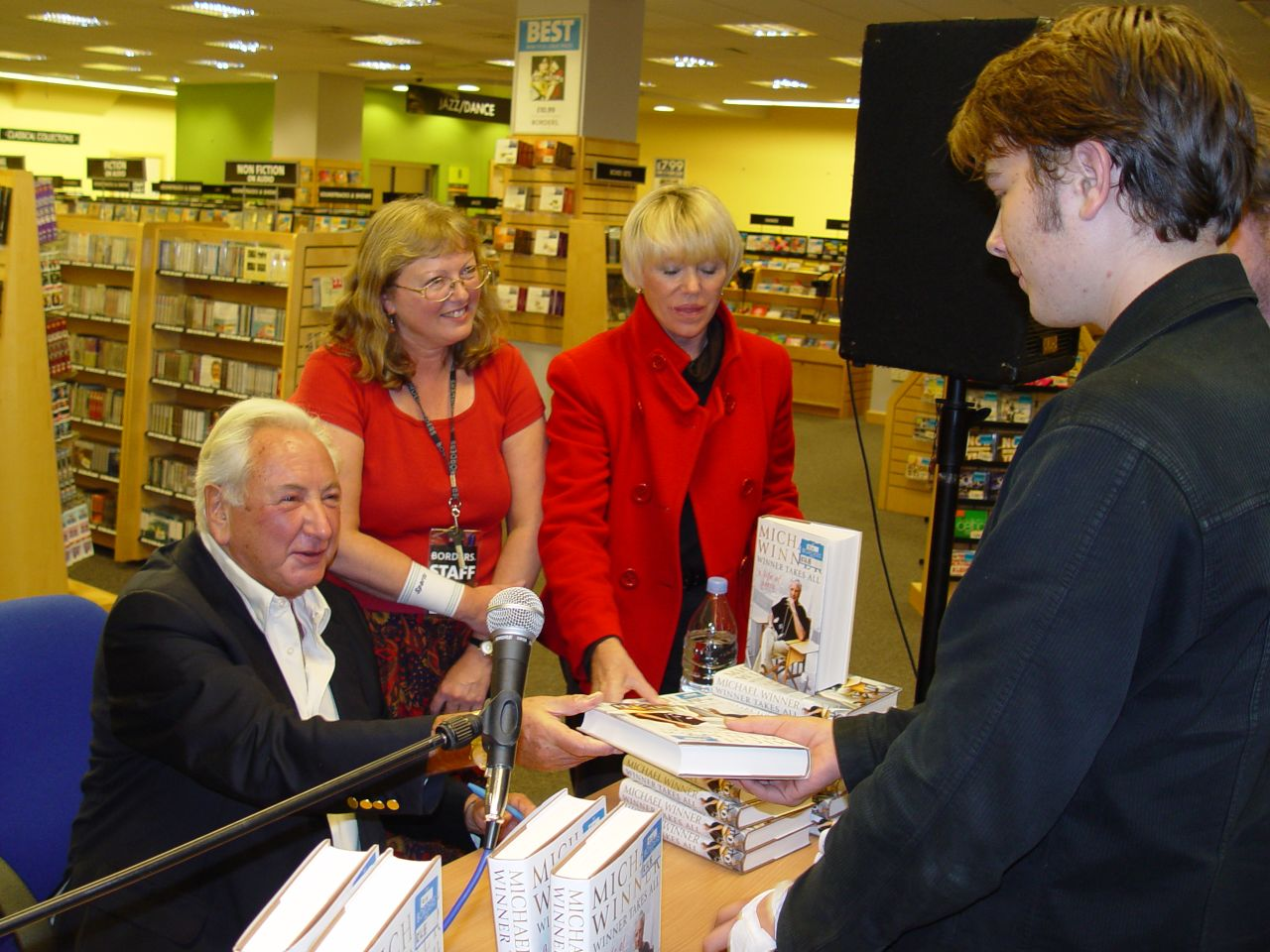
Winner, with Geraldine Lynton-Edwards (red jacket), at a book signing for his autobiography

Winner became engaged to Geraldine Lynton-Edwards in 2007. They had met in 1957, when he was a 21-year-old filmmaker and she was a 16-year-old actress and ballet dancer. They married on 19 September 2011 at Chelsea Town Hall, London. Michael and Shakira Caine were witnesses to the ceremony.

Winner lived in the former home of painter Luke Fildes in Holland Park, Woodland House, designed for Fildes by Richard Norman Shaw. It was announced in 2008 that Winner intended to leave his house as a museum, but discussions with Kensington and Chelsea council apparently stalled after they were unable to meet the £15 million cost of purchasing the freehold of the property, the lease of which expires in 2046.

On 1 January 2007, Winner acquired the bacterial infection Vibrio vulnificus from eating an oyster in Barbados. He almost had a leg amputated and was on the brink of death several times. Before recovering, Winner was infected with the 'hospital superbug' MRSA. In September 2011, he was admitted to hospital with food poisoning after eating steak tartare, a raw meat dish, four days in a row. The dish is not recommended for those with a weak immune system, and in retrospect Winner regarded his decision to eat it as "stupid".

After his death, Alex Winter, whom Winner directed in Death Wish 3, described him as "the most erudite sociopath I’ve ever met."

=== Police Memorial Trust ===
Winner established the Police Memorial Trust after WPC Yvonne Fletcher was murdered in 1984. Thirty-six local memorials honouring police officers who died in the line of duty, have been erected since 1985, beginning with that of Fletcher in St. James's Square, London. The National Police Memorial, opposite St. James's Park at the junction of Horse Guards Road and The Mall, was also unveiled by Queen Elizabeth II on 26 April 2005.

In 2006, it was reported that Winner had been offered, but declined, an OBE in the Queen's Birthday Honours for his part in campaigning for the Police Memorial Trust. Winner remarked: "An OBE is what you get if you clean the toilets well at King's Cross station." Winner subsequently alleged (on his Twitter page) that he had also turned down a knighthood.

=== Winner's Dinners ===
Winner wrote his column, "Winner's Dinners", in The Sunday Times for more than twenty years. On 2 December 2012, he announced that he was to contribute his last review because of poor health, which had put him in hospital eight times in the previous seven months. His fame as a restaurant critic was such that, at a Cornwall cafe, an unconsumed piece of his serving of lemon drizzle cake was incorporated into the Museum of Celebrity Leftovers.

=== Political views ===
Winner was an outspoken character. He was a member of the Conservative Party and supporter of Prime Minister Margaret Thatcher. Winner was praised for having liberal views on gay rights, in particular during an episode of Richard Littlejohn Live and Uncut, where he attacked the presenter (who had been in the midst of an attack on two lesbian guests) for his stance on same-sex marriage and parenting, going so far as to say to him "The lesbians have come over with considerable dignity whereas you have come over as an arsehole." After Winner's death, this moment was brought up many times in eulogies to him.

In a 2009 interview with The Daily Telegraph, Winner bemoaned political correctness, and said that if he was Prime Minister, he would be "to the right of Hitler". Following that he said "No immigration! Shoot anyone who commits a crime! Shoot people who park in the wrong place in front of my garage! I would be ferocious. And believe me, it's needed."

=== Interests and hobbies ===
Winner was an art collector, and a connoisseur of British illustration. Winner's art collection includes works by Jan Micker, William James, Edmund Dulac, E. H. Shepard, Arthur Rackham, Kay Nielsen and Beatrix Potter. His collection once included almost 200 signed colour-washed illustrations by Donald McGill.

Winner spent his free time gardening ("my garden is floodlit, so I quite often garden after midnight") or with a string of girlfriends, notably the actress Jenny Seagrove. He claimed that his life had not altered in the past 40 years: "I do essentially the same things I did as an 18-year-old," he said. "I go on dates, I make films, I write. Nothing has really changed."

== Death ==
In an interview with The Times in October 2012, Winner said liver specialists had told him that he had between eighteen months and two years to live. He said he had researched assisted suicide offered at the Dignitas clinic in Switzerland, but found the bureaucracy of the process off-putting. Winner died at his home, Woodland House in Holland Park, on 21 January 2013, aged 77, from liver disease. Winner was buried following a traditional Jewish funeral at Willesden Jewish Cemetery.

== Posthumous controversies ==
Several stunt men allege Winner was an abusive and dangerous director on film sets to his crew.

In one instance, on the production of Death Wish 3, Rocky Taylor alleges Winner created a dangerous and deceptive work environment that led to him being severely injured during a stunt. The moment called for Taylor to jump off a building and across a controlled blaze and into an arranged set of boxes. However, Taylor says Winner turned up the height of the flames while cameras rolled without consulting him. Taylor completed the stunt but missed the boxes by "about a foot," breaking his pelvis, back and receiving some burns. Taylor says Winner visited him in hospital with several newspaper photographers in tow, laid next to Taylor and whispered in his ear "don't think you can sue me, Rocky, because you can't get away with it." Taylor says the injury affected his career and "ruined my life." He recreated and performed the stunt successfully 26 years later in 2011.

=== Sexual misconduct allegations ===
In 2007, actress Helen Mirren alleged that she was sexually harassed by Winner in a casting session in 1964, which Winner denied.

Following the allegations made against Harvey Weinstein in October 2017, Winner was accused by three women, Debbie Arnold, Cindy Marshall-Day and an unidentified woman, of demanding they expose their breasts to him – in Arnold's case during an audition at his home. The two named women refused. Actress Marina Sirtis, who was directed by Winner in The Wicked Lady and Death Wish 3, has implied she was mistreated by Winner, as reported by The Stage in 2019:

When it comes to the dark side of film, TV and theatre's treatment of women, Sirtis is 'in awe of those young actresses' who have spoken out as part of the #MeToo and #TimesUp movements. She reveals she has been assaulted during her career. 'I went to see an agent here and he lifted up my dress', she says. 'And I know you're not supposed to speak ill of the dead', she adds, but she hopes that film director Michael Winner, who directed her in Death Wish 3, will 'rot in hell for all eternity'.

Olympia Dukakis, who played an uncredited role in Death Wish, said in a February 2015 A.V. Club interview that she was harassed by Winner during her audition.

In her book Star Trek: Open a Channel: A Woman's Trek, Nana Visitor describes being the target of abusive treatment by Winner on the set of The Sentinel. After the production wrapped, Visitor writes, Winner invited her to dinner and "sexually assaulted" her in his hotel room. Visitor chooses not to identify Winner by name in the text, but she specifies her character and the year, making it clear Winner was the director responsible.

== Filmography ==
(from 1967 also producer)

=== Shorts ===
- The Square (1956)
- This Is Belgium (1956)
- Man with a Gun (1958)
- It's Magic (1958)
- Danger, Women at Work (1959)
- Floating Fortress (1959) (associate producer)
- Girls, Girls, Girls! (1961) (directed and written by)
- Haunted England (1961)
- Behave Yourself (1962)

=== Feature films ===
- Shoot to Kill (1960)
- Climb Up the Wall (1960)
- Some Like It Cool (1961)
- Old Mac (1961)
- Out of the Shadow (1961)
- Play It Cool (1962)
- The Cool Mikado (1963)
- West 11 (1963)
- The System (1964)
- You Must Be Joking! (1965)
- The Jokers (1967)
- I'll Never Forget What's'isname (1967)
- Hannibal Brooks (1969)
- The Games (1970)
- Lawman (1971)
- The Nightcomers (1971)
- Chato's Land (1972)
- The Mechanic (1972)
- Scorpio (1973)
- The Stone Killer (1973)
- Death Wish (1974)
- Won Ton Ton, the Dog Who Saved Hollywood (1976)
- The Sentinel (1977)
- The Big Sleep (1978)
- Firepower (1979)
- Death Wish II (1982)
- The Wicked Lady (1983)
- Scream for Help (1984)
- Death Wish 3 (1985)
- Appointment with Death (1988)
- A Chorus of Disapproval (1989)
- Bullseye! (1990)
- Dirty Weekend (1993)
- Parting Shots (1999)

== Bibliography ==
Food writing

- Winner's Dinners: The Good, the Bad and the Unspeakable (1999)
- The Winner Guide to Dining and Whining (2002)
- The Harry's Bar Cookbook (2006, Arrigo Cipriani, foreword by Michael Winner)
- The Fat Pig Diet (2007)
- Winner's Dinners: The Restaurant & Hotel Guide (2009)
- Unbelievable!: My Life in Restaurants and Other Places (2010)

Memoirs

- Winner Takes All: A Life of Sorts (2004)
- Tales I Never Told (2011)

Miscellaneous

- Michael Winner's True Crimes (1992)
- Michael Winner's Hymie Joke Book (2012)
- Six English Filmmakers (2014, Paul Sutton, contributor Michael Winner)

Film criticism

- The Films of Michael Winner (1978, Bill Harding, foreword by Michael Winner)

Film biographies

- Fade to Black (2003, Paul Donnelley, foreword by Michael Winner)
