= Hereward the Wake (novel) =

1866 historical novel by Charles Kingsley

Hereward the Wake: Last of the English
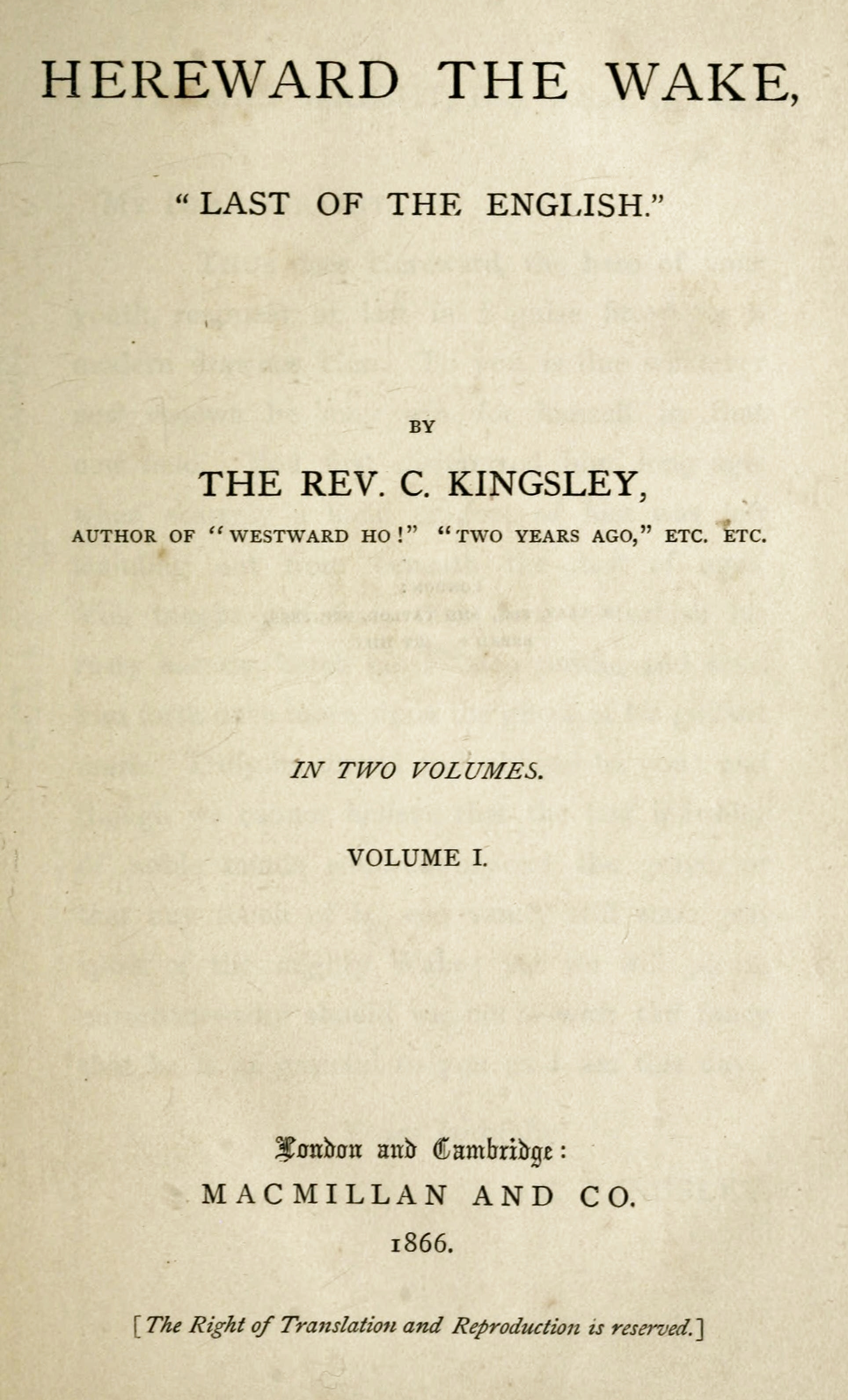
- First edition title page
- Author: Charles Kingsley
- Language: English
- Publication date: 1866
- Publication place: United Kingdom

Hereward the Wake: Last of the English (also published as Hereward, the Last of the English) is an 1866 novel by Charles Kingsley. It tells the story of Hereward, a historical Anglo-Saxon figure who led resistance against the Normans from a base in Ely surrounded by fen land. Kingsley's last historical novel, it was instrumental in elevating Hereward into an English folk-hero.

== Plot ==
Hereward is in Kingsley's novel the son of Leofric, Earl of Mercia, and Lady Godiva. He is introduced as an 18-year-old "bully and the ruffian of the fens", who is outlawed by Edward the Confessor at the request of his father. He sets off to see the world and considers such options as the Vikings of the northern seas, the Irish Danes or service with the Varangian Guard in Constantinople. He is accompanied by Martin Lightfoot, a devoted but eccentric servant.

At an early stage in his journey, Hereward defeats a caged polar bear in single combat in the north of England. He brawls his way through Cornwall and eventually arrives at the court of Baldwin of Flanders. Once there, he demonstrates his prowess against Baldwin's knights and wins the love of Torfrida, whom he marries. Three years after the Norman Conquest, Hereward returns to England and encounters the brutality of the new regime. Hereward takes revenge on the Normans who killed his brother. At a drunken feast he kills fifteen of them, with the assistance of Martin Lightfoot.

Hereward then musters a force of English rebels and takes up camp at Ely in the Fens. William of Normandy leads a host of mercenaries against Ely but is repulsed with heavy losses when the English set fire to the surrounding reeds. In spite of that victory, Hereward's resistance is worn down by the Norman invaders and the intrigues of the Countess Alftruda, who separates the hero from Torfrida. Hereward eventually swears loyalty to William and acknowledges that the Norman is indeed king of all England. Married to Alftruda, Lord of Bourne and in favour with the king, Hereward is still hated by the "French" (Norman) nobles, most of whom have lost kinsmen fighting against him, Finally Hereward's prime enemy, Ivo Taillebois, surprises him in his ancestral home. There, fighting almost alone, he is killed after a brutal struggle.

== Themes ==
The novel concerns the Anglo-Saxon (or, as Kingsley preferred, "Anglo-Danish") resistance to the Norman Conquest, which reflects Kingsley's own admiration of Germanic (or "Teutonic") vigour. Kingsley admired Norman discipline and chivalry but made it clear that primitive energies and virtues must never be entirely forsaken.

== Publication ==
The novel was first published in serial form in the monthly periodical Good Words from January to December 1865. It was then published in two volumes in 1866.

== Legacy ==
The novel had the effect of elevating Hereward into one of the most romantic figures of English mediaeval history. It is believed to have been read and used as a source of inspiration by J. R. R. Tolkien; verbal echoes include the use of "horse-boy" and the verb "ruffling", as well as Kingsley's mention of "orcs" in a list of monsters.

== Adaptations ==
- Thriller Picture Library No. 52 gave an abridged adaptation of the novel.
- The BBC made a 16-episode TV series in 1965 entitled Hereward the Wake, based on Kingsley's novel. Hereward was portrayed by actor Alfred Lynch. However, not one episode of the BBC series has survived, according to the archive records.
