= Kathleen Breck =

English actress

Kathleen Breck (born 1940), is an English actress. She was born in Mutare, Zimbabwe (then Southern Rhodesia) named Kathleen Swarbreck and took the stage name Breck.

She was chosen to star in West 11 over Julie Christie. The film was directed by Michael Winner who said "She quit acting, found a handsome and rich husband, and settled down to a delightful life with Allan Scott. He's both a screenwriter and the owner of a Scotch whisky company."

== Select credits ==
- West 11 (1963)
- Second City Reports (1964)
- Spaceflight IC-1: An Adventure in Space (1965)
- Danger Man (1965)
- The Frozen Dead (1966)
- The Three Musketeers (1966)
- The Prisoner (1967)
