= Hannibal Brooks =

1969 British film by Michael Winner

- Theatrical release poster
- Directed by: Michael Winner
- Screenplay by: Dick Clement; Ian Lafrenais
- Story by: Michael Winner; Tom Wright
- Produced by: Michael Winner
- Starring: Oliver Reed; Michael J. Pollard
- Cinematography: Robert Paynter
- Edited by: Peter Austen-Hunt; Lionel Selwyn
- Music by: Francis Lai
- Production company: Scimitar Films
- Distributed by: United Artists
- Release dates: 3 April 1969 (Fox Theater, Westwood Village, Los Angeles)
- Running time: 102 minutes
- Country: United Kingdom
- Language: English
- Budget: £1 million or less than $3 million

Hannibal Brooks is a 1969 British war comedy film directed by Michael Winner and written by Dick Clement and Ian La Frenais, based on a story by Winner and Tom Wright. It stars Oliver Reed, Michael J. Pollard and Wolfgang Preiss.

The film follows a prisoner of war's attempt to escape from Nazi Germany to Switzerland during the Second World War, accompanied by a female Asian elephant. The idea for the film was inspired by Tom Wright's diary from the war, when he was captured and spent nine months as a prisoner taking care of Asian elephants at the Munich zoo. However, the escape and all following events of the film are fictional. The title alludes to the Carthaginian military commander Hannibal who led an army with war elephants over the Alps.

== Plot ==
Lance Corporal Stephen "Hannibal" Brooks is a British prisoner of war who is put to work in Munich zoo, looking after a female Asian elephant named Lucy. When the zoo is bombed by the Americans, the zoo director decides that the zoo is unsafe for the elephant. Brooks is sent along with hostile German soldier Kurt, a friendly German soldier named Willy and Vronia, a female cook to accompany the elephant to Innsbruck Zoo via a train.

They are forced to walk when Colonel von Haller, an SS officer tells Brooks that the elephant is not allowed on the train. In Austria, Kurt threatens to shoot Lucy while drunk and Brooks accidentally kills Kurt. Brooks, Lucy, Willy and Vronia are forced to run towards the Swiss border. They are helped along the way by an American escapee named Packy who has formed a group of partisans to fight the Germans in Austria, after many run-ins with the Nazis. Half-way there, Lucy gets mumps, so Brooks finds an Austrian doctor to look after her, while Vronia and Willy run to Willy's parents' house. Vronia and Willy are captured and are later joined by Brooks. Brooks and Willy are rescued by Packy and continue to race towards Switzerland with Lucy. Unfortunately, along the way Willy is shot by the Nazis while helping Brooks to escape.

When Brooks gets close to the border with Lucy, he is met by von Haller, who tells him to walk to Switzerland and Vronia, who has changed sides after being captured. Von Haller proposes the three go together to Switzerland as he intends to defect due to Germany's deteriorating military position. They are joined by Packy and his partisans near a German border post. The plan is to use von Haller to bluff their way through but he betrays them. Vronia tries to warn the others and is shot in the back. After another long fight with the Germans, Brooks and Lucy eventually get to Switzerland with Packy and his remaining partisans. The film ends with the fairy-tale caption "AND THEY ALL LIVED HAPPILY EVER AFTER".

== Cast ==
- Oliver Reed as Stephen 'Hannibal' Brooks
- Michael J. Pollard as Packy
- Wolfgang Preiss as Colonel von Haller
- John Alderton as Bernard
- Helmut Lohner as Willi
- Peter Carsten as Kurt
- Karin Baal as Vronia
- Ralf Wolter as Dr. Mendel
- Jürgen Draeger as Sami
- Maria Brockerhoff as Anna
- Til Kiwe as von Haller's sergeant
- Ernst Fritz Furbringer as elephant keeper Kellerman
- de:Eric Jelde as zoo director Stern
- Fred Haltiner as Josef
- John Porter Davison as Geordie
- Terence Sewards as Twilight
- James Donald as Padre
- Lucy played by Aida The Elephant from Klant's Zoo, Valkenburg, Holland trained by Andre Beilfuss

== Text in opening credits ==
"The producer wishes to thank the people and authorities of Munich and Bavaria in Germany, and Tyrol and Vorarlberg in Austria, and the directors and staff of the Munich Zoo for their help in the making of this picture"

== Filming ==
Michael Winner had meant to make a film about William the Conqueror but been unable to raise finance. When that film fell through he had Hannibal Brooks ready to go. Michael J Pollard was paid $75,000 for his role. (He had received $14,000 for Bonnie and Clyde.) "Pollard will be a major star of the 70s," said Winner. Location shooting took place in Austria and Munich in May 1968.

== Paperback novelization ==
Releasing it slightly in advance of the film (normal for the era), Lancer Books published a novelization of the screenplay, by Lou Cameron, an award-winning pulpsmith of the 60s through the 80s, among whose specialties was novels of men at war.

== Reception ==
Vincent Canby of The New York Times wrote that the film "has a kind of slow, tranquilized dignity and a disarming desire to please. The extent to which it succeeds will depend largely on one's susceptibility to the old Sabu syndrome." Variety called the film a "pleasant, tame tale" in which Reed "carries the entire film on his admittedly broad shoulders but can't overcome the confused writing or the even greater burden of a poor performance by co-star, Michael J. Pollard. The latter, for some reason appearing as though he'd just completed a crash diet, is simply dreadful as a cocky Yank prisoner." Charles Champlin of the Los Angeles Times thought that the film seemed like "two or three story ideas (any one of which might conceivably have worked) interleaved into one big mish-mash which doesn't work ... Winner's direction is no help since he never really defines Reed's basic character." Clifford Terry of the Chicago Tribune called it "a preposterous, but pleasantly enjoyable film" with Reed giving "a solid, versatile performance, mixing humor and controlled anger." Gary Arnold of The Washington Post stated, "'Hannibal Brooks' should work. The technical problem is that Winner hasn't tried to draw us into the story at an easy, natural pace. He throws us into it, and almost every transition or change of scene is crudely bridged by a jump cut and a bad punch line." The Monthly Film Bulletin commented: "Hannibal Brooks suffers from a state of chronic uncertainty about just what sort of film it is trying to be. At some points all is elephant whimsy ... At others, Packy's guerrillas are in stern action, while Brooks lingers on the sidelines asking plaintively and pacifically 'what's it all for?' after the blowing up of a German convoy."
