= Some Like It Cool =

1961 British film by Michael Winner

- Theatrical release poster
- Directed by: Michael Winner
- Written by: Michael Winner
- Produced by: Adrienne Fancey
- Starring: Julie Wilson; Marc Roland
- Music by: Jackie Brown; Cy Payne
- Distributed by: S F Films
- Release date: May 1961
- Running time: 61 minutes
- Country: United Kingdom
- Language: English
- Budget: £9,000

Some Like It Cool is a 1961 British naturist film directed by Michael Winner and starring Julie Wilson and Marc Roland.

== Plot ==
Jill likes to sunbathe in the nude and persuades her fiancé Roger to visit a nudist camp on their honeymoon.

== Production ==
It was partly filmed at the Marquess of Bath's estate at Longleat.

== Cast ==
- Julie Wilson as Jill
- Marc Roland as Roger
- Wendy Smith as Joy
- Brian Jackson as Mike Hall
- Thalia Vickers as Jill Clark
- Douglas Muir as Colonel Willoughby-Muir
- Vicki Smith as partygoer

== Box office ==
Michael Winner liked to boast that the film's budget was recouped in two weeks.

== Critical reception ==
The Monthly Film Bulletin wrote: "This painfully amateurish nudist film carries the usual promotional arguments, with happy, healthy naturists, crabbed opponents, and the sort of nudist goings-on which wouldn't bring a blush to a church outing."

Kine Weekly wrote: "Titillating, yet innocuous British gimick offering. ... The production visits several established nudist camps and its artless tale of victory over prejudice blithely bounces from one amply uphostered posterior to another until it arrives at its conventional happy ending. Thalia Vickers and Mark Rolland act adequately as Jill and Roger, Douglas Muir "hams" effectively as Colonel Willoughby-Muir, and Julie Wilson, the well-known naturist, appears. The rest strip reasonably well. A clean romp in the "altogether", it's currently turned the Cinephone, Oxford Street, into the commercial travellers' Mecca."

== See also ==
- List of British films of 1961
