= Old Mac =

- Directed by: Michael Winner
- Produced by: Olive Negus-Fancey
- Starring: Charles Lamb; Vi Stevens
- Cinematography: Dick Bayley
- Edited by: Frank Burnley; Betty Gooch
- Release date: 1961
- Running time: 53 minutes
- Country: United States
- Language: English

Old Mac is a 1961 film directed by Michael Winner.
