= Anne Howard (actress) =

American actress (1925–1991)

- Born: March 18, 1925; Chicago, Illinois, U.S.
- Died: April 22, 1991 (aged 66); Los Angeles, California, U.S.
- Occupation: Actress
- Spouse(s): Leonard Caulfield (19??-1980; his death); 1 child

Anne Howard (March 18, 1925 – April 22, 1991), was an American actress.

== Early life ==
On March 18, 1925, Howard was born in Chicago, Illinois.

== Career ==
In 1929, Howard's film career started as a child actress. Her work included portraying Estella in Great Expectations (1934 film) (1934), a role for which she was chosen because she resembled Jane Wyatt, who portrayed the adult Estella.

Howard retired from acting in 1966, then became active in civic affairs.

== Personal life ==
Howard's husband was Leonard Caulfield. Howard's daughter is Vicki Caulfied. In 1980, Howard's husband died. Howard's daughter Vicki married Lewis Snow.

On April 22, 1991, Howard died of a cerebral hemorrhage in Los Angeles, California. Howard was 66.

== Filmography ==
- 1932: The Hatchet Man as Young girl (uncredited)
- 1934: Jane Eyre as Georgianna Reed (uncredited)
- 1934: She Was a Lady as Iris Vane
- 1934: Great Expectations as Estella, as a child
- 1934: Music in the Air as Elsa (uncredited)
- 1935: The Good Fairy as Child in Orphanage (uncredited)
- 1935: Princess O'Hara as Hannah O'Hara
- 1935: Navy Wife as Susan Harden
- 1936: Lady of Secrets as Child (uncredited)
- 1936: The King Steps Out as Child (uncredited)
- 1936: Anthony Adverse as Angela as a child (uncredited)
- 1936: Lloyd's of London as Catherine (uncredited)
- 1937: The Prince and the Pauper as Lady Jane Grey
- 1937: The Devil Is Driving as Miss Peters (uncredited)
- 1937: Love Is on the Air as brunette girl rooting for Curly (uncredited)
- 1940: All This, and Heaven Too as Isabelle Loullard (uncredited)
- 1940: Little Men as Daisy
- 1943: The Man from Down Under as Girl (uncredited)
- 1945: Her Highness and the Bellboy as Young Girl (uncredited)
- 1945: Kitty as Asses Milkmaid (uncredited)
- 1946: Tomorrow Is Forever as Girl Friend (uncredited)
- 1947: The Beginning or the End as English Laboratory Assistant (uncredited)
- 1948: Night Comes Too Soon as Phyllis

(U.S. title: The Ghost of Rashmon Hall)

- 1951: The Company She Keeps as Stock Girl (uncredited)
- 1951: Lorna Doone as Annie Ridd (uncredited)
