= Hereward the Wake (TV series) =

1965 lost British TV series

- Written by: Anthony Steven
- Directed by: Peter Hammond; Joan Craft
- Starring: Alfred Lynch
- Composer: Richard Rodney Bennett
- Country of origin: United Kingdom
- Original language: English
- No. of series: 1
- No. of episodes: 16 (all missing)

Production
- Producer: Campbell Logan
- Running time: 25 minutes

Original release
- Network: BBC1
- Release: 12 September – 26 December 1965

Hereward the Wake is a British television series, which was produced by the BBC in 1965, and was broadcast weekly on BBC1. It was based on the 1866 novel by Charles Kingsley. Alfred Lynch played the title role. Due to the BBC's policy of erasing video tape for reuse in the 1960s and 1970s, the entire series is lost; no episodes survive in the BBC archive.

== Cast ==
- Alfred Lynch as Hereward the Wake (16 episodes)
- Bryan Pringle as Martin Lightfoot (16 episodes)
- Yvonne Furneaux as Torfrida (11 episodes)
- John Carson as William the Conqueror (9 episodes)
- Alan Rowe as Ivo Taillebois (8 episodes)
- Francis de Wolff as Gilbert of Ghent (8 episodes)
- Justine Lord as Alftruda (7 episodes)
- David Swift as Prior Herluin (7 episodes)
- John Collin as Winter (6 episodes)
- Peter Needham as Gwenoch (6 episodes)
- Aimée Delamain as Lapp nurse (6 episodes)
- Clive Graham as Sir Raoul de Selignat (5 episodes)
- Dorothy Reynolds as Lady Godiva (5 episodes)
- Alan Lake as Edwin (4 episodes)
- Arthur Cox as Pery (4 episodes)
- Peter Stephens as Thorold (4 episodes)
- David Neal as Ranald of Ramsey (4 episodes)
- Kynaston Reeves as Baldwin (3 episodes)
- Patrick Holt as Abbot of St. Bertin (3 episodes)
- Raymond Platt as Arnoul (3 episodes)
- Peter Arne as Harold Godwinson (3 episodes)
- Margaret Vines as Gyda (3 episodes)
- Gilbert Wynne as Morcar (3 episodes)
- John Wentworth as Abbot Brand (3 episodes)
- Michael Miller as Horsa (3 episodes)
- John Harvey as Abbot Thurstan (2 episodes)
- Elizabeth Knight as Constance (2 episodes)
- Nicola Pagett as Princess Anja (2 episodes)
- Margaret John as Judith (2 episodes)
- John Sharp as King Alef (2 episodes)
- Archie Duncan as Ironhook (2 episodes)
- Anthony Boden as Raoul (2 episodes)
- Douglas Milvain as Asbjorn (2 episodes)
- Will Stampe as Landlord (2 episodes)
- George Merritt as Surturbrand (2 episodes)
- Toke Townley as Priest (2 episodes)
- Jonathan Hansen as Sir Ragnar (2 episodes)
- Jean Aubrey as Astrid (2 episodes)
- Lavender Sansom as Lise (2 episodes)
- Trudy Moors as Young Alftruda (2 episodes)
- William Hobbs as Sir Frotho (2 episodes)
- Nick Edmett as Sir Edgar (2 episodes)
- Clemence Bettany as Leonie (2 episodes)
- Donald Eccles as Witch (1 episode)
- George Coulouris as Thord Gunlaugsson (1 episode)
- Godfrey James as Svend (1 episode)
- Alethea Charlton as Gunhilda (1 episode)
- Desmond Newling as Olaf (1 episode)
- Peter Williams as King Sweyn (1 episode)
- Kathleen Byron as Adeta (1 episode)
- Michael Collins as Gareth (1 episode)
- Ian Patterson as Dolfin (1 episode)
- Pamela Reed as Queen to Edward the Confessor (1 episode)
- Walter Sparrow as Trewint (1 episode)
- Vernon Dobtcheff as Priest (1 episode)
- Raymond Llewellyn as Leofwyn (1 episode)
- John Kidd as Earl Godwin (1 episode)
- Paul Williamson as Tostig Godwinsson (1 episode)
- John Baker as Priest (1 episode)
- Roger Booth as Gilbert's Cook (1 episode)
- Kenton Moore as Jarl (1 episode)
- Kate O'Mara as Richilda (1 episode)
- John Ringham as Wilton of Ely(1 episode)
- Valerie Bell as Flemish Girl (1 episode)
- Nicholas Brent as Captain (1 episode)
- Sheila Dunn as Gertrude (1 episode)
- Milton Johns as First Witch (1 episode)
- Marie Adams as Second Witch (1 episode)
- Michael Bilton as Ursus (1 episode)
- Paddy Fast as English Woman (1 episode)
- Eric Francis as Yway (1 episode)
- Ronald Herdman as Gleeman (1 episode)
- Marguerite Young as Constance's Nurse (1 episode)
- Bernard Finch as Brother Simon (1 episode)
- Christopher Hodge as Priest (1 episode)
- Gertan Klauber as Chief Cook (1 episode)
- Anthony Sagar as François (1 episode)
- Steven Scott as Louis (1 episode)
- Anton Darby as Stable Boy (1 episode)
- Roger Brierley as Walfric the Heron (1 episode)
- Edward Caddick as First Gamekeeper (1 episode)
- Arthur R. Webb as Second Gamekeeper (1 episode)
- George Howe as Edward the Confessor (1 episode)
- Tony Steedman as Earl Leofric (1 episode)

== Episodes ==
No.	Title	Directed by	Written by	Original release date
1	"Forfeit for Eternity"	Peter Hammond	Anthony Steven	12 September 1965
How Hereward is outlawed and made to seek his fortune in the world.
2	"A Single Blow"	Peter Hammond	Anthony Steven	19 September 1965
Hereward fights the great white bear.
3	"The Brain Biter"	Peter Hammond	Anthony Steven	26 September 1965
How Hereward aids the Princess of Cornwall.
4	"A Champion's Reward"	Peter Hammond	Anthony Steven	3 October 1965
How Hereward wins the magic sword and goes from England.
5	"The Sorceress of St. Omer"	Peter Hammond	Anthony Steven	10 October 1965
How a fair lady uses the mechanical art to win Hereward's love.
6	"The Court of Love"	Peter Hammond	Anthony Steven	17 October 1965
How Hereward is given the enchanted armour but does not fight.
7	"The Wind Blows"	Peter Hammond	Anthony Steven	24 October 1965
How Hereward is angered by the Duke of Normandy's plans.
8	"Death of a King"	Peter Hammond	Anthony Steven	31 October 1965
How Hereward is made sad by news from England.
9	"The War Arrow"	Joan Craft	Anthony Steven	7 November 1965
How Hereward clears Bourne of Frenchmen.
10	"The Art of War"	Joan Craft	Anthony Steven	14 November 1965
How Hereward is knighted in the English fashion.
11	"The Broken Promise"	Joan Craft	Anthony Steven	21 November 1965
How Hereward threatens to hang Gilbert of Ghent.
12	"Live and Die"	Joan Craft	Anthony Steven	28 November 1965
How Hereward finds he and his men are trapped.
13	"The Burning of the Golden Borough"	Peter Hammond	Anthony Steven	5 December 1965
How Hereward fulfils his words to the Prior of Peterborough.
14	"Face to Face"	Peter Hammond	Anthony Steven	12 December 1965
How Hereward plays the potter and cheats the King.
15	"The King's Vengeance"	Peter Hammond	Anthony Steven	19 December 1965
How Hereward and his men defend Ely.
16	"The Last of the English"	Peter Hammond	Anthony Steven	26 December 1965
How Hereward gets his soul's price.
