= Laura Del-Rivo =

British novelist

- Born: 1934
- Died: 30 March 2022 (aged 87–88)
- Occupation: Novelist
- Writing career
- Genres: Novel, short story
- Notable work: The Furnished Room (1961)
- Website: lauradelrivo.com

Laura Del-Rivo (sometimes Del Rivo) was an English novelist.

== Life ==
Laura Del-Rivo was born in 1934. She was a descendant of Daniel O'Connell via her grandmother, Mary O'Connell. She grew up in Cheam and was educated at Holy Cross School, New Malden.

Leaving school at sixteen and working odd jobs (as an assistant at Foyle's and as a life-model, among others), she fell in with Bill Hopkins and Colin Wilson, who would later become notorious as the authors, respectively, of The Divine and the Decay (1957) and The Outsider (1956). Her circle also included Alexander Trocchi, Dudley Sutton and Ida Kar (whose portraits of Del-Rivo are in the National Portrait Gallery's collection).

Later in life, Del-Rivo worked in the Portobello Road market. She died on 30 March 2022.

== Work ==
Del-Rivo's debut novel, The Furnished Room, was well-received. Olivia Manning found in Del-Rivo a "new writer as technically assured as the veteran": "the originality of her vision and the vitality of her writing promise much for the future." It was adapted for the screen by Willis Hall and Keith Waterhouse and filmed by Michael Winner as West 11 (1963).

The Furnished Room and her second novel, Daffodil on the Pavement (1967), concerned "squalor, boredom, emptiness and despair in bed-sitter and café." In an otherwise positive review of Daffodil on the Pavement, David Rees hoped that Del-Rivo would move "away from the more obvious preoccupations of her first two novels; her considerable talent has exhausted what she has to say about this twilight world."

Speedy and Queen Kong was written between 1984 and 1988; though it remained unpublished till 2004. While it shares subject-matter with the earlier novels, as Colin Wilson notes in his afterword, it differs in style: "while her first two novels are full of realistic portraits, this book achieves its effects by means of satirical caricature."

== Publications ==
=== Novels ===
- The Furnished Room. 1st ed. London: Hutchinson, 1961. 2nd ed. London: Pan, 1963. 3rd ed. Nottingham: Five Leaves Publications, 2011.
- Daffodil on the Pavement. 1st ed. London: Hutchinson, 1967. 2nd ed. [as Animals] London: Pan, 1970.
- Speedy and Queen Kong. Nottingham: Pauper’s Press, 2004.

=== Short stories ===
- "Dark Angel," 3:AM Magazine (31 August 2012).
- "J Krissman in the Park," 3:AM Magazine (6 September 2012).
- Where Is My Mask of an Honest Man? [collection]. London: Holland Park Press, 2013.
- "Birds and Words," Holland Park Press Magazine (3 January 2018).
