= The Howard Case =

1936 film

- Directed by: Fraser Foulsham; Frank Richardson
- Written by: H.F. Maltby
- Produced by: Fraser Foulsham
- Starring: Jack Livesey; Olive Sloane; David Keir
- Production company: Sovereign Films
- Distributed by: Universal Pictures
- Release date: 10 August 1936
- Running time: 62 minutes
- Country: United Kingdom
- Language: English

The Howard Case (also known as Dangerous Venture) is a 1936 British crime film directed by Fraser Foulsham and Frank Richardson and starring Jack Livesey, Olive Sloane and David Keir. It was adapted by H.F. Maltby from his play Fraud and was produced as a quota quickie for release by Universal Pictures.

== Preservation status ==
The British Film Institute National Archive holds no stills or ephemera, and no film or video materials.

== Synopsis ==
A lawyer plots to murder his cousin and then frame his business partner.

== Cast ==
- Jack Livesey as Jerry
- Olive Melville as Pat
- Arthur Seaton as Howard / Phillips
- Olive Sloane as Lena Maxwell
- David Keir as Barnes
- Jack Vyvyan as Sergeant Halliday
- Ernest Borrand
- Vincent Sternroyd
- Gladys Mason
- Renaud Lockwood

== Reception ==
The Monthly Film Bulletin wrote: "The plot is weak, and is forced in an attempt to make it plausible. The acting is good though not oustanding."

Kine Weekly wrote: "Unimaginative crime melodrama ... The principal players strive hard to make something of the theme, but pedestrian treatment and cramped staging create too many loopholes for their efforts to be measured in terms of arresting entertainment. Quota booking for the unsophisticated. ... To be a good crime drama, it is necessary to be slick, and this British effort is anything but that. Slow moving, amateurishly directed, and not too well photographed, it ploughs the obvious course, all too frequently unconscious of a responsibility to entertain. It is, in fact, the sincerity of the principal players that alone creates enough interest to carry the film into the bottom half of the supporting feature category."

Picturegoer wrote: "Very slow and obvious story, mechanically put over with a minimum of imagination and indifferent technique. Arthur Seaton is quite good in a dual role, and the other artists make the most of the material at their command under somewhat trying circumstances."

The Daily Film Renter wrote: "Although there are various changes of scene, the production is played in cramped settings, while the plot is not at all convincing. Nevertheless, there are certain consolations, such as, for instance, the appearance of Olive Melville, an attractive newcomer, who gives a pleasing show as Pat. Arthur Seaton essays the dual roles of Howard and Phillips with as much credibility as his opportunities afford."

== Bibliography ==
- Chibnall, Steve. Quota Quickies: The Birth of the British 'B' Film. British Film Institute, 2007.
- Low, Rachael. Filmmaking in 1930s Britain. George Allen & Unwin, 1985.
- Wood, Linda. British Films, 1927-1939. British Film Institute, 1986.
