= Maurice Browning =

British actor (1919–1983)

- Born: Maurice Allen Albert Browning; 11 May 1919; West Ham, London, England
- Died: 4 December 1983 (aged 64); Denville Hall, Northwood, London, England
- Occupation: Actor
- Years active: 1949–1974

Maurice Browning (11 May 1919 – 4 December 1983) was a British television actor.

== Early life ==
He studied drama at the Guildhall School of Music and Drama, obtaining his teaching diploma. Working in repertory from 1937, he produced for amateurs before taking up the stage professionally, beginning acting the following year.

While serving as a rifleman in the army during the Second World War in Egypt, Browning awoke one morning to discover that he was completely paralysed by polio. As a result, he spent two years in hospital, stricken with infantile paralysis (spending some time in an iron lung). Despite making a recovery, it left him with a limp.

== Career ==
On being invalidated out of the army, Browning worked as a commercial artist before returning to his stage career. He was "discovered" by Emlyn Williams, who cast him in a role in his production of Spring 1600, in turn becoming his protégé.

In 1946, Browning joined the Leicester Repertory Company, drawing cartoons of himself and his colleagues every week in articles for the Leicester Chronicle. After that, he was designing sets at the Guildford Theatre before becoming producer of Huddersfield Repertory Company in 1952. Around 1955, he became a resident chairman of the Players' Theatre.

He appeared in many series, including The Avengers, The Saint, The Champions and Doctor Who. His film credits included roles in The Last Days of Dolwyn (1949), The Party's Over (1965), Where the Bullets Fly (1966) and The Assassination Bureau (1969).

Browning also made an adaptation of the Gilbert and Sullivan comic opera The Mikado that was filmed in 1963 as The Cool Mikado, and supplied the libretto for Twenty Minutes South and The Bright Arcade.

== Personal life ==
While based at the Players' Theatre in the mid-1950s, Browning also worked as a waiter for caterer Bruce Copp and personal secretary to actress Hattie Jacques. During this time, he was unable to walk but was supported by the pair: the actress continuing to pay and find accommodation for him and the latter taking him on holiday to Corfu.

== Filmography ==
- The Last Days of Dolwyn (1949) - Huw
- Interpol (1957) - Man with tick
- Beyond the Curtain (1960) - Contact Man (uncredited)
- The Party's Over (1965) - Tutzi
- Ambush at Devil's Gap (1966) - Severs
- Where the Bullets Fly (1966) - Cherub
- Casino Royale (1967) - Charly (Temple monk) (uncredited)
- The Assassination Bureau (1969) - Bureau Member (uncredited)
