= The Last Days of Dolwyn =

- Directed by: Emlyn Williams
- Written by: Emlyn Williams
- Produced by: Anatole de Grunwald
- Starring: Edith Evans; Emlyn Williams; Richard Burton; Anthony James
- Cinematography: Otto Heller
- Edited by: Russell Lloyd; Maurice Rootes
- Music by: John DH Greenwood
- Distributed by: British Lion Films
- Release date: 13 April 1949
- Country: United Kingdom
- Languages: English, Welsh
- Box office: £96,772 (UK)

The Last Days of Dolwyn (renamed Woman of Dolwyn for the American market) is a 1949 British drama film directed by Emlyn Williams and starring Edith Evans, Emlyn Williams, Richard Burton and Anthony James. The screenplay focuses on an impoverished Welsh village which becomes the site of a bitter power struggle between a callous developer and a stubborn widow.

The film marked the first film appearance of Burton, the first film appearance of Edith Evans since 1916, and the sole film to be directed by Emlyn Williams, who also wrote the screenplay.

== Plot ==
The story is set in 1892 in and around the peaceful (fictional) village of Dolwyn in Mid-Wales. A short prelude shows a plaque marking a flood and the deaths of two people, only one of whose bodies was recovered.

A consortium led by Lord Lancashire is constructing a massive dam at the head of the valley above Dolwyn, to create a reservoir to supply water to Liverpool. Construction stops when the rock, thought to be limestone, turns out to be granite. Realising it will be cheaper and easier to flood the land which includes the village (but unaware it is inhabited), Lord Lancashire dispatches his agent, Rob, to buy the land. Heavily in debt, Lady Dolwyn agrees to sell. Leaseholders are offered large sums for their leases, along with new houses in Liverpool and jobs in a cotton mill for those who want them. The villagers do not recognise Rob, but he has his own reason for wanting the village flooded; he was born and grew up there, but was forced out of the village twenty years before for thievery.

Of all the villagers, old widow Merri is the most reluctant to leave. Her son is buried in the graveyard and she hates the idea of the grave being flooded, as his father died by drowning.

While packing up to leave, Merri's foster-child Gareth, who has lived in England and speaks the language, discovers documents that prove Merri (who speaks very little English) has a right to own her land in perpetuity. A solicitor confirms the title. Lord Lancashire visits Merri, but soon realises she cannot be bought off or cajoled. To top it all, she cures his rheumatic shoulder with manipulation. He decides to use the more expensive method of construction instead, preserving the village. Rob is furious and decides to open the dam's spillway valves to flood the valley. He fails, and instead he sets fire to Merri's cottage.

Gareth catches Rob in the act, knocking him into the fire. Though Gareth tries to beat out the flames, Rob dies. Merri has witnessed the events: to protect Gareth, she conceals the body, then makes her way to the dam's valve room and opens the valves. The villagers watch sadly from nearby safe ground as their village is drowned. One young shepherd refuses to flee the flood and his defiant, lilting tenor voice is suddenly silenced as the tide consumes him.

== Cast ==
A still from the making of the film

- Edith Evans – Merri
- Emlyn Williams – Rob
- Richard Burton – Gareth
- Anthony James – Dafydd
- Allan Aynesworth – Lord Lancashire
- Barbara Couper – Lady Dolwyn
- Andrea Lea – Margaret
- Hugh Griffith – The Minister
- Maurice Browning – Huw
- Rita Crailey – Hen Ann
- Eileen Dale – Mrs. Ellis
- David Davies – Septimus
- Frank Dunlop – Ephrain
- Kenneth Evans – Jabbez
- Patricia Glyn – Dorcas
- Joan Griffiths – Eira
- Sam Hinton – Idris
- Dafydd Havard – Will
- Roddy Hughes – Caradoc
- Madoline Thomas – Mrs. Thomas
- Sybil Williams
- Tom Jones – John Henry
- Linda Hughes - little girl

== Historical parallels ==
The film's setting parallels the drowning in the 1880s of the village of Llanwddyn in Lake Vyrnwy to provide water for Liverpool. It may also be based on the construction of the Elan Valley Reservoirs, designed to supply water to Birmingham, and the tragic flooding of the beautiful neighbourhood of Nantgwyllt, beloved of the poet Shelley.

In the 1960s, Llyn Celyn was built to provide further water to Liverpool, flooding the village of Capel Celyn.

== Reception ==
The film performed disappointingly at the box office despite good reviews.
