= West 11 =

1963 British film by Michael Winner

- Directed by: Michael Winner
- Written by: Willis Hall; Keith Waterhouse
- Based on: novel The Furnished Room by Laura Del-Rivo
- Produced by: Daniel M. Angel
- Starring: Alfred Lynch; Kathleen Breck; Eric Portman; Diana Dors; Kathleen Harrison
- Cinematography: Otto Heller
- Edited by: Bernard Gribble
- Music by: Stanley Black
- Production companies: Associated British Picture Corporation; Angel Productions (as Dial)
- Distributed by: Warner-Pathé Distributors
- Release date: 8 October 1963
- Running time: 93 minutes
- Country: United Kingdom
- Language: English

West 11 (also known as West II and West Eleven) is a 1963 British crime film directed by Michael Winner and starring Alfred Lynch, Kathleen Breck, Eric Portman, Diana Dors, and Kathleen Harrison. It is based on Laura Del-Rivo's debut novel The Furnished Room (1961), adapted for the screen by Willis Hall and Keith Waterhouse. Set in west London, the title is taken from the postcode W11.

== Plot ==
In Notting Hill's jazz club, coffee bar and bedsit land of the early 1960s, Joe Beckett is a young unemployed misfit and drifter whose life takes a turn for the worse when he encounters Richard Dyce, an ex-army officer. Dyce persuades Beckett it will be in his interests to bump off Dyce's wealthy aunt for her money. Beckett travels to the old lady's house on the South coast, and prepares to murder her but loses his nerve and in a struggle, accidentally pushes her down a flight of stairs, killing her anyway. After a witness reports him, Beckett returns to his digs and finds the police waiting for him. Dyce denies all involvement and Beckett turns himself in.

== Cast ==
- Alfred Lynch as Joe Beckett
- Kathleen Breck as Ilsa Barnes
- Eric Portman as Richard Dyce
- Diana Dors as Georgia
- Kathleen Harrison as Mrs. Beckett
- Finlay Currie as Mr. Cash
- Freda Jackson as Mrs. Hartley
- Peter Reynolds as Jacko
- Harold Lang as Silent
- Marie Ney as Mildred Dyce
- Sean Kelly as Larry
- Patrick Wymark as Father Hogan
- Ken Colyer as himself
- Allan McClelland as Mr. Royce
- Francesca Annis as Phyl
- Brian Wilde as Speaker
- David Hemmings as young hoodlum (uncredited)
- Larry Dann as young hoodlum (uncredited)
- Damaris Hayman as country house guide (uncredited)
- Norman Mitchell as shop customer (uncredited)

== Production ==
In 1962, it was announced the film version would be made by Associated British starring Claudia Cardinale and directed by Joseph Losey. The job of directing eventually went to Michael Winner, who had made a number of low-budget movies including Play It Cool (1962). Winner said the film "had been turned down by a lot of people" and producer Danny Angel had "just sacked Joseph Losey because he was going to turn it into a film that Mr. Angel didn't like. I'm sure it would have been a very good film. He offered it to me because I was around. I took it with both hands. It wasn't a perfect script but it was far better than Play It Cool."

Michael Winner wanted to cast Sean Connery, Oliver Reed, Julie Christie and James Mason but says the producer overruled him. Winner used Reed in his next movie, The System (1964) Winner later said:

We had Sarah Miles who left at short notice. At the time Julie Christie was under contract to Rank. She'd done some bad comedies but I always thought she was marvellous. The producer didn't even want to test her because she'd been tested for a great many films and been rejected, including Billy Liar [1963] which she was later taken for because the girl who was chosen became ill. And we tested her and I immediately said: 'This is marvellous, we've discovered a very, very big star'. The producer turned to me and said: 'You're absolutely mad, she's a B picture actress and she'll- never be anything else'. There were seven people in the room, including the casting department of A.B.C., the Associate Producer and various other hangers on. They all concurred with the Producer – except one fellow, an A.B.C. casting assistant. Also for the same film I wanted to use Oliver Reed and the producer wouldn't consider having him because he said he was a B picture actor too.

Michael Winner said Angel "turned down Sean Connery for the other lead because he, too, was a B-picture actor, and James Mason for the villain because he was past it. We ended up with Alfred Lynch (an excellent actor but not Sean Connery), Kathleen Breck (an excellent actress but not Julie Christie) and Eric Portman, who was so good I didn't mind."

Diana Dors returned from Los Angeles where she was then living to make the movie.

It was filmed on location in Notting Hill. It was one of the last British films from Peter Reynolds.

== Critical reception ==
The Monthly Film Bulletin wrote: "Location shooting, the air of solemnity about the screenplay, and the evident striving for a genuinely contemporary flavour, all suggest a degree of ambition on the part of the makers of this film, which they seem in the event ill-equipped to realise, and a potentially interesting subject tails off into implausible melodrama. The screenplay, from the usually agile pens of Keith Waterhouse and Willis Hall, is disappointingly ponderous, while Michael Winner's direction is by turns portentous, fussy and nudgingly sly, and his handling of his players is, to say the least, unsure. ... The one wholly admirable feature is Otto Heller's appropriately harsh and sombre, and consistently excellent photography."

The Radio Times reviewer wrote: "Michael Winner's skirmish with British social realism shows what life was like in the bedsits of Notting Hill, years before Julia Roberts showed up. The script is mostly a series of loosely connected sketches, though the film's sole virtue nowadays is the location camerawork of Otto Heller that captures the then peeling and shabbily converted Regency houses that were riddled with dry rot and Rachmanism, which exchanged squalor for extortionate rents. Stanley Black and Acker Bilk's music adds a cloying note to a movie that rarely rises above basement level."

Variety observed that "it has its merits. The sleazy London locations are very authentically shown. Perhaps too authentically."

== Home media ==
In 2021 the film was digitally restored and released on DVD.
