= Clash by Night (1963 film) =

British crime thriller by Montgomery Tully

- Directed by: Montgomery Tully
- Screenplay by: Montgomery Tully; Maurice J. Wilson
- Based on: Clash by Night; 1962 novel by Rupert Croft-Cooke
- Produced by: Maurice J. Wilson
- Starring: Terence Longdon; Jennifer Jayne; Harry Fowler; Peter Sallis
- Cinematography: Geoffrey Faithfull
- Edited by: Maurice Rootes
- Music by: John Veale
- Production company: Eternal Films
- Distributed by: Grand National Pictures
- Release date: 1963
- Running time: 74 minutes
- Country: United Kingdom
- Language: English

Clash by Night (US title: Escape by Night) is a 1963 British second feature ('B') crime thriller film directed by Montgomery Tully and starring Terence Longdon, Jennifer Jayne and Harry Fowler. The screenplay was by Tully and Maurice J. Wilson based on the 1962 novel of the same name by Rupert Croft-Cooke.

== Plot ==
A bus transporting criminals from court to prison is held up by crooks who rescue one of their gang. The bus is driven to a deserted farm and the other occupants of the bus are locked in a barn. To give the gang leader plenty of time to escape, he tells everyone – two prison officers, the driver and five prisoners – that the barn has been doused in petrol, and that two gang members will stay behind outside to guard it, and will set fire to the straw-filled building if anyone tries to escape. The prisoners and officers start to interact, but soon find they may be in danger from yet another source.

== Cast ==
- Terence Longdon as Martin Lord
- Jennifer Jayne as Nita Lord
- Harry Fowler as Doug Roberts
- Alan Wheatley as Ronald Grey-Simmons
- Peter Sallis as Victor Lush
- John Arnatt as Inspector Croft
- Hilda Fenemore as Mrs. Peel
- Arthur Lovegrove as Ernie Peel
- Vanda Godsell as Mrs. Grey-Simmons
- Richard Carpenter as Danny Watts
- Mark Dignam as Sydney Selwyn
- Robert Brown as Mawsley
- Stanley Meadows as George Brett
- Tom Bowman as Bart Rennison
- Ray Austin as the intruder
- William Simons as guard outside barn (uncredited)
- Geoffrey Denton as station sergeant (uncredited)

== Critical reception ==
Monthly Film Bulletin wrote: "Despite the coincidences on which so much of the story depends, this is a fairly entertaining thriller, briskly developed and with well-written dialogue."

Variety wrote: "Although too weak to stand on its own, the oft-told tale of human crosstypes found in an assortment of escaped convicts comes off fairly well thanks to several good performances. Tight budget has meant tight production and it shows. ... Director Montgomery Tully, unable to provide much room for his cast to swing, has chosen to stress characterizations rather than action. ... Technical credits are only fair except barn-burning which is very ably presented and provides most of film's action."

The Radio Times Guide to Films gave the film 1/5 stars, writing: "The only interesting thing about this bargain-basement tale of escaped prisoners is the sight of Peter Sallis gleefully torching a barn that has already been doused in paraffin."
