= Night Comes Too Soon =

- American poster
- Directed by: Denis Kavanagh
- Written by: Edward Bulwer-Lytton (story); Pat Dixon
- Produced by: Harold Baim
- Starring: Valentine Dyall; Anne Howard; Alec Faversham
- Cinematography: Ray Densham
- Edited by: Dorothy Elliot
- Production companies: British-Animated Productions, and; Federated Film Corporation
- Distributed by: Butcher's Film Service
- Release date: 24 May 1948
- Running time: 52 minutes
- Country: United Kingdom
- Language: English

Night Comes Too Soon (U.S. tite: The Ghost of Rashmon Hall; also known as A Ghost Story) is a 1948 British second feature ('B') horror film directed by Denis Kavanagh and starring Valentine Dyall, Anne Howard and Alec Faversham. It was written by Pat Dixon based on the 1859 story The Haunters and the Haunted by Edward Bulwer-Lytton, and also incorporates the "changing picture" component from The Mezzotint by M. R. James.

== Cast ==
- Valentine Dyall as Dr. George Clinton
- Anne Howard as Phyllis
- Alec Faversham as John
- Howard Douglas
- Beatrice Marsden as Mrs. Paxton
- Arthur Brander
- Anthony Baird as Lionel Waddell
- Frank Dunlop
- David Keir as the estate agent
- Monti DeLyle as ghost of Rinaldo Sabata
- Nina Erber as ghost of Marianna Sabata
- John Desmond as ghost of the sailor

== Production ==
It was shot at a manor house near Mill Hill, part of a trend of renting country houses rather than studio space by low-budget producers after the Second World War.

== Reception ==
The Monthly Film Bulletin wrote: "The story, as filmed, is unlikely to chill any spines, and those who have read or seen Lord Lytton's play The Haunted and the Haunters, of which this is an adaptation, will scarcely consider it an impressive piece of work. Those who have not will wonder what it is all about. The film's chief interest lies in the effective use of lighting in the 'ghostly' sequences."

Kine Weekly wrote: "Valentine Dyall impresses in a theatrical sort of way as George Clinton, but Anne Howard and Alec Faversham lack screen experience as Phyllis and John. The rest are merely stooges."

Picturegoer wrote: "This short ghost story fails in its intention to make the flesh creep. It is treated heavy-handedly, and is not nearly clear enough in its intention. Valentine Dyall is theatrically effective, but there is not a great deal to be said about the rest of the cast."

The Daily Film Renter wrote: "Valentine Dyall, star of this Federated production, invests the psychic with velvety arrogance."

In British Sound Films: The Studio Years 1928–1959 David Quinlan rated the film as "mediocre", writing: "Dreary chiller with no scares."
