= David Keir =

British actor (1884–1971)

David Keir (1884–1971) was a British film actor, who also appeared on stage.

== Selected filmography ==
Year	Title	Role	Notes
1936	The Howard Case	Barnes	
1938	The Return of the Frog	Number 23	
1939	The Arsenal Stadium Mystery	Dr. Meadow	
1939	Trunk Crime	Quiney	
1940	The Girl Who Forgot	Drawbridge	
1940	Two for Danger	Professor Shaw	
1941	The Ghost of St. Michael's	Mr Humphries	
1941	The Farmer's Wife	Auctioneer	
1942	Salute John Citizen	Turner	
1942	Let the People Sing	Mr. Finningley	
1942	Front Line Kids	The Parson	
1943	Variety Jubilee	Theatre Bar Patron	
1943	The Shipbuilders	Jury Foreman	
1945	Meet Sexton Blake!	Charlie Kunn	
1945	Pink String and Sealing Wax	Stage doorkeeper	
1946	Under New Management	Colonel	
1946	I'll Turn to You	Estate agent	
1946	The Captive Heart	Mr. McDougall	
1947	Code of Scotland Yard	Gentleman Customer	
1947	The Brothers	Postman	
1948	Night Comes Too Soon	Estate Agent	(U.S. title: The Ghost of Rashmon Hall)
1949	A Man's Affair	Curly	
1951	Smart Alec	Mr. Guppy	
1951	Honeymoon Deferred	Professore	
1952	The Happy Family	Process Server	
1953	Rob Roy, the Highland Rogue	Servant to Argyll	
1956	Strange Experiences	Man	2 episodes
