= Out of the Shadow (1961 film) =

1961 British film by Michael Winner

- Directed by: Michael Winner
- Written by: Michael Winner
- Produced by: Olive Negus-Fancey; Michael Winner
- Starring: Terence Longdon; Donald Gray; Diane Clare; Robertson Hare; Dermot Walsh
- Cinematography: Dick Bayley
- Music by: Jackie Brown; Cy Payne
- Production company: Border Film Productions
- Distributed by: New Realm Pictures
- Release date: 1961
- Running time: 61 min.
- Country: United Kingdom
- Language: English

Out of the Shadow (also known as Murder on the Campus) is a 1961 British thriller film directed and written by Michael Winner and starring Terence Longdon, Donald Gray, Diane Clare, Robertson Hare and Dermot Walsh.

== Plot ==
Reporter Mark Kingston is informed that his brother, a student at Cambridge University, has committed suicide, but he is not convinced. The police dismiss his suspicions, so he begins his own investigation with the help of Mary Johnson, whose father, a professor, has gone missing.

== Cast ==
- Terence Longdon as Mark Kingston
- Diane Clare as Mary Johnson
- Donald Gray as Inspector Wills
- Robertson Hare as Ronald Fortescue
- Dermot Walsh as Professor Taylor
- Felicity Young as waitress (Jill)
- Douglas Muir as Sergeant Willoughby
- Mark Eden as Police Constable
- Harold Siddons as newspaper editor
- Jill Hyem as Joy Clark

== Cricital reception ==
The reviewer for Kine Weekly wrote: "The tale is a bit involved but the characters, adequately portrayed, are briskly shuffled, its light relief is apt, the romantic asides are agreeable, and it ends on a lively, if hardly unexpected, note. What's more, the backgrounds are authentic. Safe quota 'second'."

The Monthly Film Bulletin said: "A not uninteresting plot, if perhaps too liberally loaded with red herrings, and the Cambridge settings are the best features in an otherwise shoddily-made and -played second feature."

== DVD release ==
The film was released, as Murder on the Campus, on DVD in the UK in October 2013, in a two-film collection with the thriller Final Appointment (1954).
