= Bernie Winters =

British comedian and musician (1930–1991)

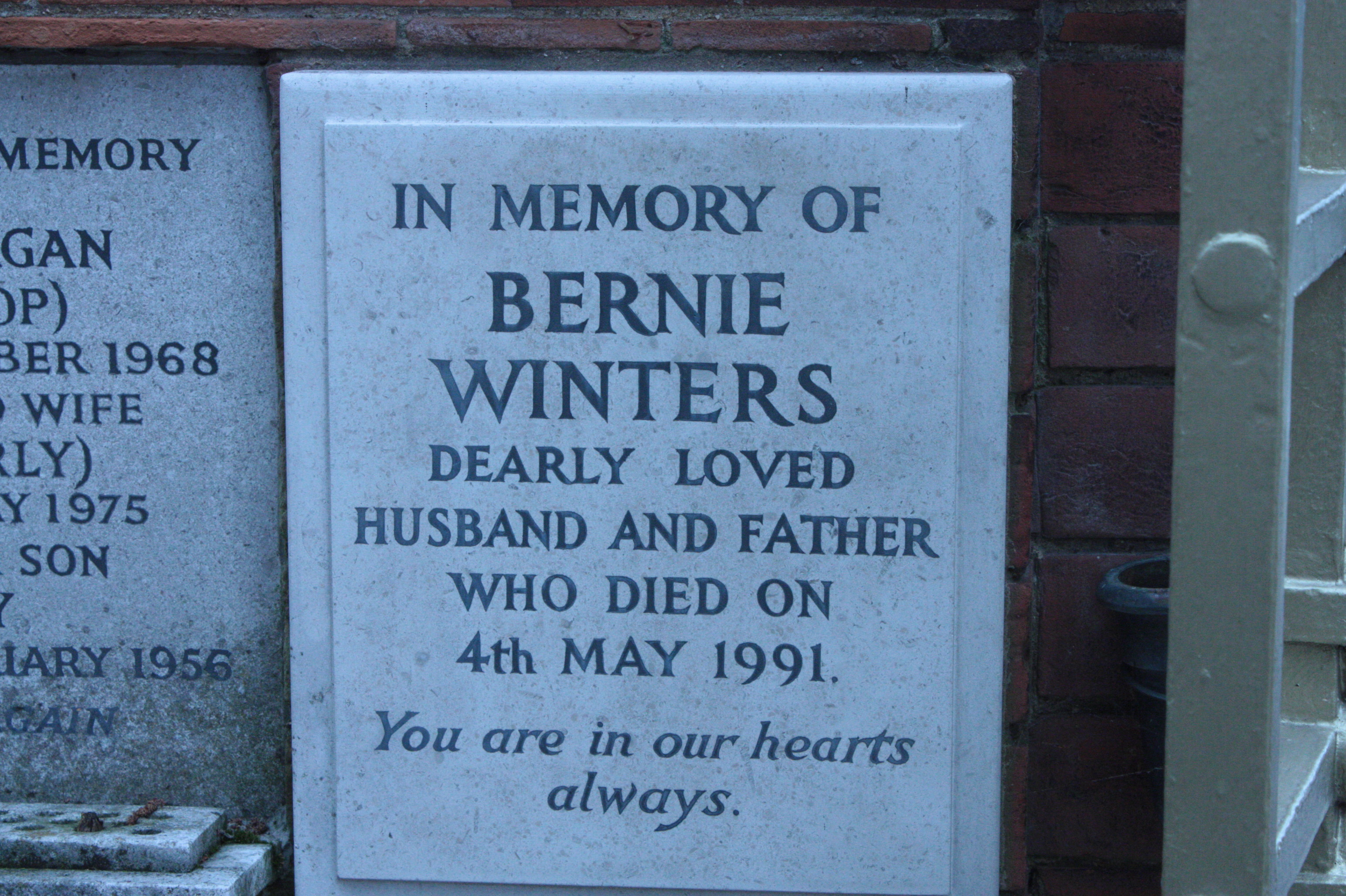
- Memorial to Bernie Winters, Golders Green Crematorium
- Born: Bernie Weinstein; 6 September 1930; Islington, London, England, UK
- Died: 4 May 1991 (aged 60); London, England, UK
- Occupations: Comedian, musician, actor, TV presenter
- Years active: 1957−1990
- Spouse: Siggi Winters
- Children: 1
- Parent(s): Samuel Weinstein; Rachel Bloomfield
- Relatives: Mike Winters

Bernie Winters (born Bernie Weinstein; 6 September 1930 – 4 May 1991) was an English comedian, actor, musician and TV presenter, and the comic foil of the double act Mike and Bernie Winters with his older brother, Mike. Winters later performed solo, often with the aid of his St Bernard dog, Schnorbitz.

== Early life ==
Bernie Winters was born Bernard Weinstein at the now demolished Salvation Army Maternity Home on Old Street in Islington, London on 6 September 1930. His father, Samuel, was a bookmaker and boxer, and his mother Rachel worked in the circus. One of his grandfathers had emigrated to the UK from Russia. When Bernie was three, the family moved to Tottenham, where they were neighbours with Harrison Marks.

== Career ==
=== Mike and Bernie Winters ===
Winters served in the merchant navy and performed as a musician at dances and weddings before forming the double act Mike & Bernie Winters with his brother Mike. In October 1957, the duo appeared on Six-Five Special and were described in the Daily Mirror as top comics for Britain's teenage TV audience. They had been recommended to the show's presenter Josephine Douglas by Tommy Steele, with whom they had been on a stage tour. They both left the show the same day she did, 10 May 1958.

The brothers became popular in the 1960s, they appeared on the Royal Variety Performance and hosted their own show from 1965 to 1973. One of Bernie's gimmicks would be to poke his head through a curtain and say "Eeeeh!", followed by him pulling Mike's cheeks and calling him "choochy-face". Bernie also had the catchphrase "I'll smash yer face in".

By the late 1970s, Winters was having an affair with a dancer twenty years his junior, Dinah May, which reportedly started when she was eighteen and Bernie was forty. When he was named in Dinah's divorce suit, Mike, who was also involved in an affair, openly mocked Bernie, which strained their relationship. The two brothers split up the double act in 1978.

=== Solo ===
Bernie Winters was briefly under contract to Warwick Productions.

Winters hosted his own comedy show for Thames Television, Bernie (1978–1980), for ITV, which had two series and a total of thirteen episodes. In the late 1970s and early 1980s, Winters also presented The Big Top Variety Show, a television series of variety shows from a circus ring; while on this show, Winters was accompanied by his St Bernard dog, Schnorbitz. In 1984 he presented the second series of the game show Whose Baby?. He became a regular on shows such as Punchlines and Give Us a Clue and gave an impression of Bud Flanagan on television and later on stage, with Leslie Crowther as Flanagan's partner Chesney Allen.

Winters appeared as himself in the London Weekend Television sitcom Bottle Boys in 1985.

== Personal life ==
Although he fell out with Mike, the brothers reconciled in 1985, when Mike returned from America for an operation. Winters was a member of the showbusiness fraternity the Grand Order of Water Rats.

== Death ==
On 14 August 1990, after several months of discomfort and stomach pains, he had a nine-hour operation on his stomach to remove a tumour. Though he was never told, Winters' condition was already terminal, and he died on 4 May 1991 at The London Clinic, aged 60.

He was cremated at Golders Green Crematorium in London on 8 May and his ashes interred in the Garden of Remembrance. Mourners included Ronnie Corbett, Jimmy Tarbuck, Des O'Connor, Bob Monkhouse, Henry Cooper, Ted Rogers, Su Pollard, Alfred Marks, John Inman and Rose-Marie. A memorial plaque was erected in the crematorium's West Memorial Court.
