= Neville Taylor =

Australian rules footballer (born 1953)

Personal information
- Full name: Neville Clifford Taylor
- Born: 22 June 1953 (age 73)
- Original team: Warrnambool
- Height: 183 cm (6 ft 0 in)
- Weight: 76 kg (168 lb)
- Position: Utility

Playing career^{1}
Years	Club	Games (Goals)
1974–75, 1978–82	Fitzroy	92 (11)
1976–77	East Perth	
- ^{1} Playing statistics correct to the end of 1982.

Neville Clifford Taylor (born 22 June 1953) is a former Australian rules footballer who played with Fitzroy in the Victorian Football League (VFL) and East Perth in the West Australian Football League.
