= Alfred Burger =

Chemist (1905–2000)

- Born: 6 September 1905; Vienna, Austria-Hungary
- Died: 30 December 2000 (aged 95)
- Occupations: scientist, professor
- Spouse: Frances Page Burger (m. 1935)

Academic background
- Education: Ph.D., University of Vienna, 1928
- Thesis: Synthesis of Benzoisoquinoline Alkaloids
- Doctoral advisor: Ernest Späth

Academic work
- Discipline: Medicinal chemistry
- Institutions: Drug Addiction Laboratory, National Research Council; University of Virginia

Alfred Burger (6 September 1905 – 30 December 2000) was a prominent chemist and a pioneer in medical chemistry. Burger was born in Vienna, the capital of the Austro-Hungarian Empire, on 6 September 1905. He was the son of S. L. Burger (a civil servant) and Clariss Burger.

He received a Ph.D. degree from the University of Vienna in 1928. His dissertation was entitled, "Synthesis of Benzylisoquinoline Alkaloids." He traveled to the University of Virginia as a postdoctoral fellow synthesizing morphine analogs with minimal addictive properties. He worked as a research chemist in Switzerland before emigrating to the United States in 1929. He then became a research associate at the Drug Addiction Laboratory of the National Research Council at the University of Virginia where he conducted research on the chemistry of opium alkaloids and the synthesis of morphine substitutes. In 1938, he joined the faculty of University of Virginia where he remained until 1970. He reached the rank of full professor in 1952.

His research activities with a staff of 40 graduate and 33 postdoctoral students included studies on the design and synthesis of analgesic, chemotherapeutic, and antidepressant drugs. One of his synthetic compounds was developed as a widely used clinical antidepressant under the name of tranylcypromine.

In the 1950s, Burger defined the principles of medicinal chemistry when he wrote its first-ever textbook, Burger's Medicinal Chemistry and Drug Discovery, which has had at least six editions. Burger also became the first editor of the Journal of Medicinal Chemistry.

He founded the Journal of Medicinal Chemistry in 1958 and served as its editor for 14 years. He also served as editor of Medicinal Chemistry Research and as chairman of the ACS Division of Medicinal Chemistry.

Burger authored over 200 papers and numerous books. His other books include Understanding Medications; Searching, Teaching & Writing-What Fun; Drugs & People; Drugs Affecting the Peripheral Nervous System; and Drugs Affecting the Central Nervous System.

== Awards and honors ==
Alfred Burger received the Louis Pasteur Medal of the French Pasteur Institute in 1953. In 1977, he received an honorary degree from the Philadelphia College of Pharmacy and Science, as well as the Smissman Award from the American Chemical Society. He has also received the Award in Medicinal Chemistry from the American Pharmaceutical Association. He was inducted into the American Chemical Society Division of Medicinal Chemistry Hall of Fame in 1977. GlaxoSmithKline established the Alfred Burger Award in Medicinal Chemistry in 1978 in his honor.

== Personal ==
Alfred Burger was married to Frances Page Burger since 1935. He had Parkinson's disease. He died on 30 December 2000, at the age of 95.
