= Terence Longdon =

English actor (1922–2011)

- Born: 14 May 1922; Newark-on-Trent, Nottinghamshire, England
- Died: 23 April 2011 (aged 88); Oxford, Oxfordshire, England
- Education: RADA
- Occupation: Actor
- Years active: 1950–2003
- Spouses: Barbara Jefford (m. 1953; div. 1960); Gillian Conyers (m. 2004)

Terence Longdon (born Hubert Tuelly Longdon; 14 May 1922 – 23 April 2011) was an English actor.

== Biography ==
Born in Newark-on-Trent, Nottinghamshire, England. During World War II, Longdon was a pilot with the Fleet Air Arm, protecting Atlantic convoys. While stationed at a naval base near Blackpool, he acted in a show and was seen by actor Douglas Hurn who encouraged him to pursue it.

After the war, Longdon trained at RADA (1946–48), and made his first stage appearance at the Lyceum, Sheffield in 1948, and his West End debut the same year.

He was best known for his lead role in the 1950s–1960s British TV series Garry Halliday where he played a Biggles-like pilot who flew into various adventure situations; he also co-wrote one episode of the series in 1962. He was also known for his character actor roles in British television productions such as The Sandbaggers, Danger Man and The Avengers. He was in a small role in The Woman for Joe and according to Filmink "the film is stolen literally at the last minute" by Longdon.

In film, he was Drusus, Messala's personal aide, in the film Ben-Hur. He had a major supporting role in the 1958 film Another Time, Another Place starring alongside Sean Connery and Lana Turner. He was also in four of the early Carry On films. He played occasional leading roles, most notably in the tense B-movie thriller Clash by Night (1963).

Terence Longdon lived on the border of Gloucestershire and Warwickshire. He died from cancer on 23 April 2011, aged 88.

== Partial filmography ==
- Appointment with Venus (1951) - (uncredited)
- Angels One Five (1952) - Pimpernel Pilot
- Never Look Back (1952) - Alan Whitcomb
- Appointment in London (1952) - Dr.Buchanan
- Forbidden Cargo (1954) - A.P.O. at Customs Launch (uncredited)
- Mr. Arkadin (1955) - Secretary
- The Woman for Joe (1955) - Doctor at the Circus (uncredited)
- Simon and Laura (1955) - Barney
- Helen of Troy (1956) - Patroclus
- Jumping for Joy (1956) - John Wyndham
- The Man Who Never Was (1956) - Larry
- Doctor at Large (1957) - George - House Surgeon
- Dangerous Exile (1957) - Col. Sir Frederick Venner
- The Silent Enemy (1958) - Lieutenant Bailey
- Another Time, Another Place (1958) - Alan Thompson
- Carry On Sergeant (1958) - Miles Haywood
- Carry On Nurse (1959) - Ted York
- Ben-Hur (1959) - Drusus
- Carry On Constable (1960) - Herbert Hall
- Carry On Regardless (1961) - Montgomery Infield-Hopping
- Out of the Shadow (1961) - Mark Kingston
- On the Fiddle (1961) - Air Gunner
- What a Whopper (1961) - Vernon
- Strange Experiences (1962) - Fighter Pilot
- Clash by Night (1963) - Martin Lord
- The Return of Mr. Moto (1965) - Jonathan Westering
- The Bellcrest Story (1973, 10 episodes) - Bob Orpenshaw
- The Wild Geese (1978) - Anonymous Man
- The Martian Chronicles (1979, TV Mini-Series) - Martian Elder
- The Sea Wolves (1980) - Malverne
- Coronation Street (1981-1982, 16 episodes) - Wilf Stockwell
- Letters from the East (1995) - Juri
- Hitler: The Rise of Evil (2003, TV Mini-Series) - Baron No. 1 (final appearance)
