= Harold Baim =

British filmmaker (1914–1996)

- Born: 6 April 1914; Leeds
- Died: 1 March 1996 (aged 81); Reading
- Occupations: Film producer, director and writer

Harold Baim (1914–1996) was a British film producer, director and writer.

== Early life ==
Harold Baim was born in Leeds in 1914. According to his family, Baim left the family home in Leeds after the death of his father in 1929, and by 1936 had moved to London. Having originally wanted to be a journalist, he gained employment working in the film industry operating the clapperboard for film producers. He moved into film distribution and production at MGM, United Artists and First National, moving onto Columbia Pictures selling their films to the Odeon, ABC and Gaumont cinema chains. In December 1938 he joined the board of Renown Pictures. Baim worked with film producer and distributor James George Minter at Renown, becoming a senior director with Minter in March 1941.

== Films ==
In May 1941 Baim formed his own company, The Federated Film Corporation. His first film was Lady Luck.

Baim became a prolific producer of 35mm short films, creating over 300 titles in his lifetime. The short films were originally created for the British cinema and mainly made for distribution with United Artists features enabling the chain to meet legal requirements for the minimum number of UK-made productions shown. The subjects of his early films featured music hall and variety theatre acts such as Wilson, Keppel and Betty. His later and more well known films were mainly travelogues filmed in England, Europe, the Middle East, South Africa, America and Asia as well as music compilations featuring footage of well-known pop music acts of the era.

The travelogues are perhaps the best known and best remembered of Baim's output. Baim wrote the scripts which were recorded by well known actors and broadcasters of the period including narrators Valentine Dyall, David Gell, Peter Dimmock, Terry Wogan, Ed Bishop, Franklin Engelmann, Kenneth MacLeod and Nicholas Parsons.

Baim applied a consistent formula to the creation of his films. No one addresses the camera; the camera becomes the narrator's "eyes" as they interpret the scene. Wherever he went, Baim took a consistent approach in introducing his subjects to the audience. His travelogue's often opened by featuring transport facilities such as motorways, bus stations and airports. Then he would record the old town, educate the audience with a bit of history and then contrast this with new "sophisticated" office blocks and shopping centres. The shadow of World War Two looms large in the films. Not everyone in the industry was a fan of Baim and he was attacked in publications, notably in A Long Look at Short Films (1966). In November of that year Baim took part in a BBC television programme The Look of the Week where he robustly defended his work.

Baim provided an early career boost for Michael Winner who directed and scripted five Baim films from 1959 to 1963.

Other surviving black and white films are Playing the Game, a comic look at the game of golf released in 1967, A Pocket Full of Rye, Where The Avon Flows, Our Mr Shakespeare, Cartoons and Cartoonists, The Things People Do, Stadium Highlights, and Science is Golden.

Baim also made several 'B' features, including Night Comes Too Soon (1948) and The Fantastic World of Film, a compilation of early silent American comedy films.

A radio documentary on Baim's films, entitled Telly Savalas and the Quota Quickies, was broadcast on BBC Radio 4 in 2008.

In 2011 the BBC produced the documentary Harold Baim's Britain on Film featuring 30 minutes of clips from twenty-three of the British films.

== The Baim Collection ==
The Baim Collection licences footage for feature films and television documentaries, and in 1999 began a project to restore and digitise the surviving films. Over 80 of the surviving 130 titles have been restored and are available for licence, and some donated to the British Film Institute's National Archive. More than 70 films are thought to be lost.

The Baim Collection continues to search for lost prints and negatives of over 100 missing titles produced by Baim, many produced between 1945 and 1957. These include: Cormorant Fishing, Cotswold Craftsmen and Where The Avon Flows, Say Abracadabra (1952) and The Mood Man (1965).

== Personal life ==
Baim married Glenda Freedman (1919–2021) in April 1940. In 1976 he became Chief Barker of the Variety Club of Great Britain. He died in Reading, Berkshire in 1996.
