= Mike Winters (comedian) =

English comedian (1926–2013)

- Born: Michael Weinstein; 15 November 1926; Islington, London, England
- Died: 24 August 2013 (aged 86); Gloucestershire, England
- Occupations: Comedian; musician; businessman; writer
- Known for: Partnership with Bernie Winters

Mike Winters (born Michael Weinstein; 15 November 1926 – 24 August 2013) was an English comedian, musician, businessman and writer who was the straight man of the comedy double act Mike and Bernie Winters with his younger brother, Bernie.

== Early life ==
He was born at 15 Canonbury Lane, Islington, north London, where his father was a bookmaker. One of his grandfathers had emigrated to the UK from Russia. Mike won a scholarship to Tottenham Grammar School but was evacuated to Wiltshire with his younger brother where he eventually ended up at the City of Oxford High School for Boys. At 15 Winters won a scholarship and grant to the Royal Academy of Music to study clarinet, where he was one of the founders of the Royal Academy of Music Jazz Quintet.

In World War II, Winters, who was underage, joined the Merchant Navy. Following a medical discharge due to sinusitis he enlisted in the Canadian Legion as a musician, reaching the rank of captain. He then played jazz with his brother on drums and performed as a musician at dances and weddings.

== Career ==
=== Mike and Bernie Winters ===
Winters formed a double act with his younger brother, Bernie. They began appearing on television in the mid-1950s, including the Six-Five Special in 1957. The brothers became popular in the 1960s, they appeared on the Royal Variety Performance and hosted their own show from 1965 to 1973.

By the late 1970s, Bernie Winters was having an affair with a dancer twenty years his junior, Dinah May, which reportedly started when she was eighteen and Bernie was forty. When he was named in Dinah's divorce suit, Mike, who was also involved in an affair, openly mocked Bernie, which strained their relationship. The two brothers split up the double act in 1978.

=== Solo career ===
After the double act with his brother ended in 1978, Winters moved to Florida because his wife suffered from arthritis. Winters opened the first theatre club in Miami and worked with legendary boxing manager, Angelo Dundee, presenting black-tie boxing events. Winters was also active in charity work, with visits to Miami from Muhammad Ali, Prince Michael of Kent and Prince Edward and was awarded the city of Miami keys by the mayor. Winters also co-produced with Jude Parry, directed, performed and wrote the first British professional pantomime to appear in Florida, it was such a success that they continued for five years, starring not only local young talent but also Davy Jones of the Monkees.

=== Writer ===
He published five books including a biography of Angelo Dundee and The Axis of Greatness about the relationship between Angelo and his boxers Sugar Ray Leonard and Muhammad Ali. His two novels are Miami One Way and Razor Sharp and his last book was a light-hearted memoir called The Sunny Side Of Winters.

== Personal life ==
On 21 October 1955, Winters married Cathelene Mary (Cassie) Chaney (b. 1931), a Roman Catholic and an art student, daughter of Horace Vernon Chaney, French polisher. Three years later they had a Jewish ceremony. They had two children. They remained married for fifty-seven years, until Winter's death. Bernie died in 1991.

In 1964 Winters and his brother were inducted into the show business fraternity, the Grand Order of Water Rats. Winters was the owner of a 1965 Alvis TE21 sports coupe in white, which he purchased at the Earls Court Motorshow.

== Death ==
Mike Winters died of pancreatic cancer on 24 August 2013 in Fairford, Gloucestershire. He was survived by his wife Cassie and their two children, as well as five grandchildren.
