= Charles Lamb (actor) =

British actor (1900–1989)

- in Reach for the Sky (1956)
- Born: 20 November 1900; London, England
- Died: 19 March 1989 (aged 88); London, England
- Occupation: Actor
- Years active: 1924–1989

Charles Lamb (20 November 1900 – 19 March 1989) was a British stage, film and television actor. Previously an engineer, he made his theatre debut in 1924.

His stage work included appearing in the original theatrical production of Brighton Rock at the Garrick Theatre in 1943.

His longest running role was as Mrs Dale's gardener, Monument, in the radio soap opera Mrs Dale's Diary.

== Selected filmography ==
- Once a Crook (1941) − Joseph
- Stop Press Girl (1949) − Green Line Conductor (uncredited)
- The Galloping Major (1951) − Ernie Smart, Horse Owner
- The Lavender Hill Mob (1951) − Mr. Richards (uncredited)
- Appointment with Venus (1951) − Jean − the Cowman
- Curtain Up (1952) − George
- Come Back Peter (1952) − Mr. Hapgood
- Genevieve (1953) − Publican (uncredited)
- The Intruder (1953) − Glazier (uncredited)
- Meet Mr. Lucifer (1953) − 2nd Trap Door Stage Hand (uncredited)
- Impulse (1954) − Mr. Palmer (Car Mechanic) (uncredited)
- Solution by Phone (1954) − (uncredited)
- Delayed Action (1954) − Bank clerk
- Raising a Riot (1955) − Greengrocer (uncredited)
- One Jump Ahead (1955) − Mr. Lamb
- John and Julie (1955) − Man In Train
- The Feminine Touch (1956) − Jenkins
- The Extra Day (1956) − Porter at Flats (uncredited)
- Reach for the Sky (1956) − Walker / Desoutters Aide (uncredited)
- The Tommy Steele Story (1957) − Mr. Steele
- Hell Drivers (1957) − Cafe Owner (uncredited)
- Light Fingers (1957) − (uncredited)
- Lucky Jim (1957) − Contractor
- Davy (1958) − Henry
- The Salvage Gang (1958) − Shorty
- Model for Murder (1959) − Lock Keeper
- Jack the Ripper (1959) − Stage Door Keeper
- The Nun's Story (1959) − Pascin (uncredited)
- The Wreck of the Mary Deare (1959) − Court Clerk (uncredited)
- The Shakedown (1960) − Pinza
- School for Scoundrels (1960) − Carpenter
- The Criminal (1960) − Mr. Able
- The Hands of Orlac (1960) − Guard (uncredited)
- Sword of Sherwood Forest (1960) − Old Bowyer
- The Curse of the Werewolf (1961) − Chef
- Old Mac (1961) − Father
- Design for Loving (1962) − Walter
- Jigsaw (1962) − Mr. Peck (uncredited)
- Hide and Seek (1964) − Porter
- The End of Arthur's Marriage (1965) − Dad
- Life at the Top (1965) − Wincastle
- Charlie Bubbles (1967) − Mr. Noseworthy
- Quatermass and the Pit (1967) − Newsvendor
- Subterfuge (1968) − Caretaker
- The Southern Star (1969) − Todd
- Hadleigh (1969) – Joe
- Hands of the Ripper (1971) − Guard
- Universal Soldier (1972) − Taxi Driver (uncredited)
- The Mirror Crack'd (1980) − 2nd Man in Village Hall (uncredited)
- An Englishman Abroad (1983) − George
- The Tall Guy (1989) − Old Man in Wheelchair (final film role)
