= Alfred Lynch =

English actor (1931–2003)

- Autographed still from The Password Is Courage (1962)
- Born: 26 January 1931; Whitechapel, London, UK
- Died: 16 December 2003 (aged 72); Saltdean, East Sussex, UK
- Years active: 1959–2000
- Partner: James Culliford

Alfred Cornelius Lynch (26 January 1931 – 16 December 2003) was an English actor on stage, film and television.

== Early life ==
Lynch was born in Whitechapel, London, the son of a plumber. After attending a Catholic school, he worked in a drawing office as a draughtsman before entering national service in the army. Then, while working in a factory, he attended theatre acting evening classes, at which he met his life partner, James Culliford.

== Stage ==
In 1958 he joined the Royal Court Theatre and acted in a number of plays, including original productions of Chicken Soup with Barley and The Kitchen by Arnold Wesker. Lynch also starred in Joan Littlewood's production of Brendan Behan's The Hostage in London and New York, in which critic Kenneth Tynan praised his "beautiful playing".

== Screen work ==
After 1960 his career moved more into film and television, with leading roles in On the Fiddle (1961) and West 11 (1962), as well as prominent roles in Two and Two Make Six and The Password Is Courage (both 1962) and supporting roles in 55 Days at Peking (1963) and The Hill (1965). He also appeared as Tranio in 1967's The Taming of the Shrew and as Medvedenko in the 1968 adaptation of The Sea Gull, while he later played Charlie Kray in the 1990 film The Krays.

On television he had the title role in the now-lost TV series Hereward the Wake (1965), as well as the lead in Manhunt (1969), along with a number of roles in one off plays, in series such as Theatre 625, The Wednesday Play and Armchair Theatre. He appeared in a number of popular television series in later years, including Jackanory, Going Straight, Bergerac, Lovejoy, Pie in the Sky and the Doctor Who serial The Curse of Fenric as Commander Millington.

== Death ==
After Culliford's stroke in 1972, Lynch moved from London to Saltdean, near Brighton, until his death from cancer in 2003. He was cremated at Woodvale Crematorium, Brighton.

== Selected filmography ==
=== Film ===
Year	Title	Role	Notes
1959	Look Back in Anger	2nd Commercial Traveller	
1961	On the Fiddle	Horace Pope	
1962	Two and Two Make Six	Thomas 'Tom' Ernest Bennett	
1962	The Password Is Courage	Corporal Bill Pope	
1963	55 Days at Peking	Gerald	Uncredited
1963	West 11	Joe Beckett	
1965	The Hill	George Stevens	
1967	The Taming of the Shrew	Tranio	
1968	Something Like Love		
1968	The Sea Gull	Medvedenko	
1973	The Blockhouse	Larshen	Uncredited
1977	Joseph Andrews	Postilion	
1981	Loophole	Harry	
1990	The Krays	Charlie Kray	
1991	Until the End of the World	Old Man Alfred	
1994	Second Best	Edward	

=== Television ===
Year	Title	Role	Notes
1959- 1968	Armchair Theatre	Taff/ Bill Jones/ Freddy/ Jupp/ Eddy	6 episodes
1965	Hereward the Wake	Hereward	16 episodes
1965	Theatre 625	Gordon Comstock	Story: "Keep the Apidistra Flying"
1965- 1968	The Wednesday Play	Bishorpe/ Eddy Marble/ Peter Young	3 episodes
1968	ITV Playhouse	Edgar Lunt	Story: "Your Name's Not God, It's Edgar"
1969	The Gold Robbers	Josef Tyzak	Episode: "Dog Eat Dog"
1970	Manhunt	Squadron Leader Jimmy Briggs	19 episodes
1971	Thirty-Minute Theatre	Barney	Story: "Something for the Children"
1975	Churchill's People	King James I	2 episodes
1978	Going Straight	Dave Pipers	Episode: "Going Off the Rails"
1980- 1981	The Good Companions	Joby Jackson	3 episodes
1983	Shades of Darkness	Saul Rutledge	Story: "Bewitched"
1985- 1987	Bulman	Joe Revell	2 episodes
1987	Floodtide	P.F.	4 episodes
1989	Boon	Geoff Kershaw	Episode: "Of Meissen Men"
1989	Doctor Who	Commander Millington	Serial: "The Curse of Fenric" (4 episodes)
1990	Bergerac	Whittaker	Episode: "Under Wraps"
1993	Lovejoy	Gideon	Episode: "The Ring"
1995	Pie in the Sky	Bill Pritchard	Episode: "The One That Got Away"
1996	Kavanagh QC	Pearson	Episode: "A Stranger in the Family"
2000	Monsignor Renard	Hubert	1 episode
