= Jack Jackson (radio personality) =

English trumpeter and bandleader (1906–1978)

Background information
- Born: John Jackson; 20 February 1906; Belvedere, Kent, England
- Died: 15 January 1978 (aged 71) Rickmansworth, Hertfordshire, England
- Genres: British dance band
- Occupations: Bandleader; trumpeter; composer; disc jockey; singer
- Instruments: Trumpet, cornet, vocals
- Years active: 1917-1973

Jack Jackson (born John Jackson; 20 February 1906 – 15 January 1978) was an English trumpeter and bandleader popular during the British dance band era, and who later became a highly influential radio disc jockey. The BBC's nickname "Auntie" is often credited to Jackson.

== Early life and career ==
Jackson was born Belvedere, Kent, in 1906, the son of a brass band player and conductor, and began playing cornet at the age of 11, before playing violin and cello in dance bands. He learnt to play trumpet and worked in swing bands in circuses, revues, ballrooms and ocean liners.

In 1926, Bert Ralton brought his band to England, and Jackson joined them for a three-month tour of southern Africa, starting at Cape Town in October. In January 1927, they were in Rhodesia (now Zimbabwe); they played in Salisbury (Harare), then stayed on for a hunting picnic party. However, Bert Ralton was shot in the leg and died the next day.

== Fame ==
Jackson joined Jack Hylton's band in 1927, staying until 1930 as the orchestra's lead trumpet and cornet. During this time, he also "freelanced" for numerous bands and studio orchestras. After leaving Hylton in late 1930, Jackson returned to England where, after briefly playing with Ray Noble and Roy Fox, he joined Jack Payne and the BBC Dance Orchestra in 1931, staying with him after leaving the BBC the following year. He left Payne to form his own band in February 1933. By the end of year, Jack Jackson and his Orchestra started a five-year residency at the Dorchester Hotel in London. His signature tune was "Make Those People Sway", and his regular closing theme tune was "Dancing in the Dark". By 1939, he had a regular radio show on Radio Luxembourg. His band featured vocalists such as Al Bowlly, Denny Dennis and Alberta Hunter.

== Later life and career ==
After the war, he decided not to reform his band, and turned to compering on the BBC Light Programme in such shows as Record Roundup, which ran from 1948 to 1977. His methods of presentation included punctuating records with surreal comedy clips and using quick cutting of pre-recorded tapes to humorous effect. This was a major influence on later British disc jockeys such as Kenny Everett, Adrian Juste and Noel Edmonds.

He had a chat show on ITV in 1955. His presentation style was evident in the 1960 comedy and musical film Climb Up the Wall (1960), in which he starred. He acted in the musical film Stars in Your Eyes in 1956, and appeared as himself in Jamboree (1957).

Jackson emigrated to Tenerife in 1962, sending his taped programmes by air to the BBC each week. He was one of the disc jockeys that launched BBC Radio 1 on Saturday 30 September 1967, broadcasting at 1pm with the Jack Jackson Show. He then moved from Radio 1 to BBC Radio 2.

Suffering from a bronchial illness, he returned to live in Britain in 1973, and died in Rickmansworth, Hertfordshire, in 1978. He was 71.

== Legacy ==
He is remembered today as a member of the UK Radio Academy's Hall of Fame.

Jackson's two sons, Malcolm and John, ran the Jackson Studios which their father started. They also launched the Ad-Rhythm record label. It was used by Elton John, Tom Robinson and Motörhead. Jackson's daughter is a successful artist and designer, whilst his grandchildren also have careers in the music business, including one who co-founded the production group Bimbo Jones. The group contributed to a UK Singles Chart number one when their Miami Calling mix was used as the lead mix for radio airplay of Meck's "Thunder In My Heart Again" in February 2006. Jackson and his family's creative lives were explored in a 2011 BBC Radio 4 documentary, Jack Jackson: Rhythm and Radio Fun Remembered.

== Sources ==
- Mitchell, Jack; Dellow, Nick (2013). "BERT RALTON AND HIS HAVANA BAND" (PDF). Vintage Jazz Mart www.vjm.biz. Archived (PDF) from the original on 8 September 2018.
