= Trader Horn (disambiguation) =

Trader Horn (born Alfred Aloysius Smith; 1861–1931) was an ivory trader in central Africa, who also wrote a book of the same name.

Trader Horn or Trader Horne may also refer to:

- Trader Horn (1931 film), directed by W.S. Van Dyke and based on the eponymous book by Trader Horn
- Trader Horn (1973 film), a remake of the 1931 film, directed by Reza Badiyi
- Trader Horne (band), British musical group
- Trader Horne (baseball) (Berlyn Dale Horne) (1899-1983), American baseball player

== See also ==
- Trader Hornee, a 1971 sexploitation film that parodied the 1931 film directed by W.S. Van Dyke
