= Literacy-targeted instruction in economics =

The literacy-targeted (LT) approach to teaching introductory economics courses ("principles" courses) emphasizes mastery of a limited number of core concepts to foster deep understanding and real-world application. Rather than covering a wide range of topics superficially, the LT approach focuses on developing flexible, transferable knowledge that students can apply in multiple, personal economic contexts.

== Origins and development ==
The term “literacy targeted” originated from a 2002 article by Hansen, Salemi, and Siegfried: “A Principles course targeted to literacy must focus more on basic concepts than today’s courses and texts do. Educational resources released by limiting the number of topics must be used to deepen student understanding of core ideas” (p.466). While the LT approach has gained currency since 2002, it has deep historical roots. As early as 1950, the American Economic Association recommended that "the number of objectives and the content of the elementary course should be reduced," advocating for a more focused curriculum. In 1963, Nobel Prize-winning economist George Stigler criticized the superficial nature of introductory economics courses, stating that "the watered-down encyclopedia... does not teach the student how to think on economic questions." Similarly, Robert Frank argued that "the best way to teach introductory microeconomics is to expose students to repeated applications of a short list of the core ideas" which aligns with the core idea of the LT approach — teaching fewer concepts more deeply, using methods that increase comprehension and retention. The economic education literature shows that the ideas behind LT teaching have been present for decades, even before the term became widely used. The Journal of Economic Education published a special symposium (volume 55, issue 2) on the Literacy Targeted approach to teaching introductory economics in 2024.

== Principles and implementation ==
Principles courses are often designed to prepare students for upper-level economics classes, assuming they will continue in the major. However, roughly 80% of students who take principles courses never take another economics course, and only 2% eventually major in economics (Stock, 2024). This calls into question the practice of designing principles courses for future majors. As Hansen, Salemi, and Siegfried (2002) note, the principles course often fails to improve economic literacy because it prioritizes covering many technical topics over teaching students how to apply economics to real-world decisions. Given that 80% of students are "one and done" LT proponents start with the question, "what should go into the only economics course most students will ever take?" and recommend the LT approach because it focuses in on helping students think like economists in their daily lives.

Literacy-targeted instruction emphasizes not only what students learn but also how they learn. Goffe and Wolla (2024) argue that reducing the number of economic concepts and models covered in introductory courses creates opportunities to use evidence-based teaching strategies from cognitive science. These include spaced practice, in which student revisit concepts over time, and interleaving, in which students practice applying concepts in different contexts rather than studying them in isolation. The authors illustrate this approach using the production possibilities frontier and circular flow model, demonstrating how repeated and varied applications of foundational models can support deeper understanding and longer-term retention of economic knowledge.

The literacy-targeted approach has also been incorporated into introductory economics textbooks. Avi J. Cohen and Scott Wolla's Economics for Life series, including Microeconomics for Life: Smart Choices for You and Macroeconomics for Life: Smart Choices for All, emphasize the application of core economic concepts to everyday decisions, with the goals of developing economic literacy.

== Research ==
Research supports the effectiveness of the literacy-targeted approach. A study at the University of Toronto, using an 11-year dataset with over 13,000 students, compared the outcomes of students taking traditional principles of economics courses with those enrolled in LT principles courses. The study found no significant differences in performance in intermediate economic theory or statistics courses. An earlier study at the University of North Carolina at Chapel Hill with 7,000 students over 3 years produced comparable results. Both studies concluded that LT economics instruction benefits the majority of students who take only principles courses, while doing no disadvantaging students who go on to major in economics, resulting in a Pareto efficient outcome.
