= William W. Norton =

American screenwriter (1925–2010)

- Born: William Wallace Norton Jr. September 24, 1925; Ogden, Utah
- Died: October 1, 2010 (aged 85); Santa Barbara, California
- Occupations: Screenwriter; gunrunner
- Spouses: Betty Conklin (divorced): Eleanor Norton
- Children: 3

William Wallace "Bill" Norton, Jr. (September 24, 1925 – October 1, 2010) was an American screenwriter particularly notable for his collaborations with Burt Reynolds. Later in life, he was convicted of gun running in France when he tried to send arms from the United States to the Irish National Liberation Army in Northern Ireland. After being released from prison, he moved to Nicaragua, where he shot and killed an intruder in his Managua home. He later spent a year living in Cuba but became disillusioned with Communism and was reportedly smuggled from Mexico into the U.S. by his ex-wife.

== Early life ==
Norton was born to Andrena "Rena" (née Callahan) and William Wallace Norton in Ogden, Utah, where his parents owned a ranch which they lost at the start of the Great Depression. His family moved to Berkeley, California, and then later to El Monte. He attended El Monte High School, where he was class president.

=== World War II ===
During World War II, Norton enlisted in the United States Army and served in Europe as an infantry officer with 5th Infantry, 71st Infantry Division with Patton's Third Army. He started writing, using his life experience of growing up poor and serving in the military, and some of his plays were produced by local theater companies.

Because he joined the Communist Party in his youth and in 1958 was called to testify before the House Un-American Activities Committee, though he did not name anyone.

== Hollywood ==
He wrote for the television series The Big Valley, which was broadcast from 1965 to 1968. His big screen breakthrough came with his script for the 1968 film The Scalphunters, set in the antebellum West, with the movie starring Burt Lancaster, Ossie Davis and Shelley Winters.

Other screenplays that Norton wrote included the Angie Dickinson vehicle Big Bad Mama, produced by Roger Corman, and the John Wayne detective film Brannigan (1975). He wrote the Burt Reynolds vehicles Sam Whiskey, The Man Who Loved Cat Dancing, White Lightning and Gator. When asked by a nurse the day before he died if she would know any of Norton's films, he replied "I don't think your I.Q. is low enough".

== Ireland ==
After moving to Ireland in the mid-1980s, Norton was angered by attacks staged against Roman Catholic residents of Northern Ireland. He flew back to the U.S. and purchased a number of guns to bring back to supply the Irish National Liberation Army (INLA). Norton also purchased a camping van and had a hidden compartment made. The van was shipped aboard a Panamanian ship inside a container, from Los Angeles to the port at Rotterdam. The van, still inside the container, was then put on a truck and hauled from Rotterdam, through Belgium, to the port of Le Havre, France. Authorities were watching the van, which had two submachine guns, 12 rifles, 23 revolvers and 2,200 rounds of ammunition in the hidden compartment. Norton and his wife, Eleanor, were arrested on June 11, 1986, trying to retrieve the vehicle and were both convicted. Also arrested with them were two INLA members, James MacLaughin and Sean Hughes, and also Hughes' girlfriend Susan May. Susan May's two children, who were with her, were taken to a children's home.

=== Prison ===
In August 1987, William Norton, Hughes and MacLaughin were each sentenced to four years in prison, while Eleanor Norton was sentenced to three years with two of those suspended. Additionally, the group was forbidden to return to France for five years, and they were fined a total of US$81,700. Susan May was not convicted.

Norton was released after 19 months while his wife served five months before her release on medical grounds. The couple were subject to a U.S. warrant on the gun smuggling charges and were granted asylum in Nicaragua.

== Central America and Cuba ==
After bandits broke into his house in Managua, he was able to find a gun and shot and killed one of the robbers.

He relocated to Cuba in the 1990s, but rapidly became disenchanted with life under Communism. He moved, this time to Mexico, and sought the help of his daughter and his first wife to bring him back into the United States. He met his family members in Tijuana, and they smuggled him back across the U.S. border. He settled in Santa Barbara, California, where he reportedly spent years worrying that the FBI would arrest him until a lawyer convinced him that he had nothing to worry about. He wrote a script, Exiled in America, based on his experiences, which was produced by Paul Leder.

== Death ==
Norton died in Santa Barbara of a heart attack, aged 85, on October 1, 2010. He was survived by his second wife, Eleanor, as well as by two daughters and a son, writer-director Bill L. Norton. His first marriage, to the former Betty Conklin, had ended in divorce.

== Filmography ==
- The Grass Eater (1961) - writer, producer
- Five Minutes to Love (1963) - writer
- How to Succeed with Girls (1964) - writer, producer
- The Farmer's Other Daughter (1965) - writer, producer
- The Big Valley (1965–69) (TV series) - writer
- The Scalphunters (1968) - writer
- Sam Whiskey (1968) - writer
- The McKenzie Break (1970) - writer
- Marigold Man (1970) - writer, producer
- The Hunting Party (1971) - writer
- I Dismember Mama (1972) - writer
- The Man Who Loved Cat Dancing (1973) - writer (uncredited)
- Trader Horn (1973) - writer
- White Lightning (1973) - writer
- Big Bad Mama (1974) - writer
- Brannigan (1975) - writer
- A Small Town in Texas (1976) - writer
- Moving Violation (1976) - writer
- Gator (1976) - writer
- Day of the Animals (1977) - writer
- Night of the Juggler (1980) - writer
- Dirty Tricks (1981) - writer
- September Gun (1983) (TV movie) - writer
- The Eleventh Commandment (1986) - writer
- Big Bad Mama II (1987) - original characters
- Exiled in America (1992) - based on his play
