= Watson B. Duncan III =

American college professor (1915–1991)

- Born: February 16, 1915; Charleston, South Carolina
- Died: February 21, 1991 (aged 76)
- Occupation: Professor
- Known for: Mentor of Burt Reynolds
- Spouse: Honey Harper

Watson Boone Duncan III (February 16, 1915 – February 21, 1991) was an American college professor best known for being the mentor of actor Burt Reynolds.

== Early life and education ==
Duncan was born in Charleston, South Carolina, son of Methodist minister Rev. Watson Boone Duncan, Jr. (1892-1945) and Herveylene, née Spear. His grandfather, Rev. Watson Boone Duncan (1867-1930), was a well-known Methodist minister and author of books on religion, poets, and poetry. The Duncan family was of Scottish origin.

Duncan received B.A. and M.A. degrees from the University of South Carolina, where he majored in English. He also did graduate work at the Shakespeare Institute & Royal Theatre at the University of Birmingham in England.

== Family and career ==
Duncan began teaching Speech and English in 1948 at Palm Beach Junior College in Lake Worth, Florida, where he would eventually lead the English department. In 1953, he married Martha "Honey" Harper. They had met in 1949 when she was a student sitting in the front row of his class. She survived Duncan, and died 4 May 2022 aged 90.

Students were known to wait a year to get into his classes at the Junior College, which even then would fill to up to 100 students. As a professor, his teaching style was flamboyant, dramatic, and rendered his material quite unforgettable. Generations of students remember his shout of "Me miserable!" a trademark of his Paradise Lost lectures, and recall his classes as some of the most memorable experiences of their college years.

Duncan was also a gifted Shakespearean actor, and performed frequently in the Shakespeare Festival at Stratford, Ontario.

== Mentorships ==
Burt Reynolds attended Palm Beach Junior College while recuperating at home in Riviera Beach from football injuries he suffered playing for Florida State University. Duncan saw a spark of talent in Reynolds, and asked him to read for a play, Sutton Vane's Outward Bound, which the college was presenting. Duncan cast Reynolds in the lead role. This eventually led to a scholarship for Reynolds at the Hyde Park Playhouse in New York City. Reynolds credited Duncan as the person who had the most influence in his life.

Years later, Reynolds cast his former teacher in a cameo role as the press secretary to the governor in the film Gator, which Reynolds starred in and directed.

Duncan went on to head the English/Communications Department at Palm Beach Junior College for more than thirty years, specializing in Milton and Shakespeare. He also helped develop the talents of actor Monte Markham and Terry Garrity, author of The Sensuous Woman, while they were students at Palm Beach Junior College.

== Honors ==
In 1980 Duncan was named Distinguished Floridian of the Year, in 1985 given the National Faculty Award and then in 1987, the Exchange Club of Lake Worth's Golden Deeds Award.

Palm Beach County honored the popular teacher by naming two buildings after him. In 1986 the Watson B. Duncan III Theater was built and dedicated to him. It is a spacious, performing arts theater on the main campus of Palm Beach State College in Lake Worth that serves as a performing arts instructional facility and hosts a variety of cultural and entertainment events for the public.

And in 1991 his name was given to the new Watson B. Duncan Middle School in Palm Beach Gardens.

== Filmography ==
- Gator (1976)

== See also ==
Watson B. Duncan III Tribute, Palm Beach State College History
