= White Lightning (1973 film) =

Action film by Joseph Sargent

- Theatrical release poster by Tom Jung
- Directed by: Joseph Sargent
- Written by: William W. Norton
- Produced by: Arthur Gardner; Jules V. Levy
- Starring: Burt Reynolds; Jennifer Billingsley; Ned Beatty; Bo Hopkins; Matt Clark
- Cinematography: Edward Rosson
- Edited by: George Nicholson
- Music by: Charles Bernstein
- Distributed by: United Artists
- Release dates: June 27, 1973 (Benton, Arkansas); August 8, 1973 (New York)
- Running time: 101 minutes
- Country: United States
- Language: English
- Box office: $6.5 million (US/ Canada rentals)

White Lightning is a 1973 American action film directed by Joseph Sargent, written by William W. Norton, and starring Burt Reynolds, Jennifer Billingsley, Ned Beatty, Bo Hopkins, R. G. Armstrong and Diane Ladd. It marked Laura Dern's film debut.

Bobby "Gator" McKlusky (Reynolds), in an Arkansas prison for running moonshine, agrees to work for the Department of the Treasury to investigate crooked county sheriff J. C. Connors (Beatty), who killed Gator's younger brother Donny. Seeking revenge, he soon infiltrates the local moonshine industry.

== Plot ==
Bobby "Gator" McKlusky is incarcerated in an Arkansas state prison for running "white lightning." When he learns that his younger brother, Donny, was killed by Bogan County Sheriff J. C. Connors, he attempts to escape but is quickly re-captured. The sheriff is taking money from local moonshiners, and Gator agrees to go undercover for the United States Department of the Treasury in their corruption and smuggling investigation. His true motive is revenge for his brother's murder, and he has no intention of gathering any evidence against his fellow moonshiners.

The Feds give Gator a high-performance 1971 Ford Custom 500 and direct him to contact Dude Watson, a local stock car racer and low-level whiskey runner, who is forced to cooperate because he is already on probation. To infiltrate the local moonshine industry, Dude introduces Gator to Roy Boone, one of the county's top runners working for moonshiner Big Bear, who is also Sheriff Connors's enforcer. Gator starts an affair with Roy's girlfriend Lou while gaining the trust of Roy and Big Bear as he slowly plots his revenge against the sheriff.

Sheriff Connors discovers Gator is working for the federal government and sends Big Bear after him. Dude is subsequently shot and killed, while Gator and Lou escape and seek refuge at Sister Linda Fay's Home for Unwed Mothers, which is located deep in the woods. Gator knows the Feds will want evidence against the sheriff and the moonshiners, but Connors's men find him first. Gator escapes in his Ford and intentionally goads Connors into pursuing him. After a drawn-out car chase, Gator tricks Connors into jumping his patrol car over an embankment and into the river. Connors drowns when his car sinks, as Gator watches with satisfaction. With Connors dead and no evidence against any of the moonshiners, the disappointed Feds escort Gator and Lou out of Bogan County as the sheriff's funeral procession passes nearby.

== Cast ==
- Burt Reynolds as Bobby "Gator" McKlusky
- Jennifer Billingsley as Lou
- Ned Beatty as Sheriff J. C. Connors
- Bo Hopkins as Roy "Rebel Roy" Boone
- Matt Clark as "Dude" Watson
- Louise Latham as Martha Culpepper
- Diane Ladd as Maggie
- R. G. Armstrong as "Big Bear"
- Conlan Carter as Deputy
- Dabbs Greer as Pa McKlusky
- Lincoln Demyan as Warden Sims
- John Steadman as "Skeeter"
- Iris Korn as Ma McKlusky
- Stephanie Burchfield as Jenny
- Barbara Muller as Louella
- Laura Dern as Sharon Anne (uncredited)

== Production ==
The film was originally called McKlusky. It was announced by Jules Levy, Arthur Gardner and Arnold Laven in October 1971 as part of a seven-picture slate they intended to make for United Artists over two years through their company Levy-Gardner-Laven. It was an original script by William W. Norton, who often wrote for the producers. The villain of the script, Sheriff J. C. Connors, was based on the real-life Sheriff Marlin Hawkins. The movie's title White Lightning denotes chiefly in Midland and the Southern U.S. a very high proof of moonshine or homemade whiskey. This pure-grain alcohol is typically colorless and usually not aged. The term was first recorded in the early 20th century.

Burt Reynolds' casting was announced in February 1972. He had worked with the writer and producers previously on Sam Whiskey in 1969. Reynolds called the film "the beginning of a whole series of films made in the South, about the South and for the South. No one cares if the picture was ever distributed north of the Mason-Dixon line because you could make back the cost of the negative just in Memphis alone. Anything outside of that was just gravy. It was a well-done film. Joe Sargent is an excellent director. He's very, very good with actors. And it had some marvelous people in it whom nobody had seen before. Ned Beatty for example. I had to fight like hell to get Ned in the film."

The film was almost directed by Steven Spielberg, who had previously made three TV movies (1971's Duel, 1972's Something Evil and 1973's Savage) and decided to direct White Lightning the same year. "I spent two-and-a-half months on the film," said Spielberg, "met Burt once, found most of the locations and began to cast the movie, until I realized it wasn't something that I wanted to do for a first film. I didn't want to start my career as a hard-hat, journeyman director. I wanted to do something that was a little more personal." So he quit White Lightning and went to do Sugarland Express, which he found more challenging for three reasons, "the changing relationships among the trio in the car, the nature of 'the chase,' and how to handle the digressions." Joseph Sargent signed to direct in May. The filming began on July 15, 1972. Shooting took place in and around Little Rock, Arkansas. Hal Needham performed stunts in the film.

The film's music was written by Charles Bernstein. Some of this score was also used by Quentin Tarantino in his 2003 film Kill Bill: Volume 1 and his 2009 film Inglourious Basterds. Bernstein's score was released by Intrada Records in May 2010.

== Reception ==
The film has a score of 67% on Rotten Tomatoes based on 9 reviews.

Roger Greenspun of The New York Times called it "a fairly awful movie" with "endless car chases, which are a crushing bore." Variety characterized the film as "hit-and-miss," adding, "Reynolds is quite up to all the demands of his smashing role, as he forges toward his goal. Too often, though, too much footage is devoted to incidentals that detract." Gene Siskel of the Chicago Tribune gave the film three-and-a-half stars out of four and wrote that "what sets White Lightning apart from a demolition derby is the special work of the entire cast in creating a totally believable world out of characters that we've seen countless times before ... Only an abrupt ending keeps White Lightning from achieving some level of greatness." Charles Champlin of the Los Angeles Times called it "that scarce commodity, a stirring, satisfying summer-weight entertainment ... Reynolds delivers a varied, screen-commanding star turn which is a pleasure to watch." Gary Arnold of The Washington Post wrote that the film "begins straight and then starts messing around at random. The inevitable result is an expendable movie, neither straightforward crime melodrama nor consistent shaggy-dog comedy." Clyde Jeavons of The Monthly Film Bulletin declared, "Moonshine melodrama with a veneer of serious intent which is rapidly planed away by Burt Reynold's frivolous acting and Joseph Sargent's weakness for car chases."

A sequel, Gator, was released in 1976.

== Legacy ==
On the TV series Archer, the film and its sequel are favorites of the title character, Sterling Archer (H. Jon Benjamin), though he believes Gator to be the stronger installment. He gets the films easily confused, though, as he believes several key scenes from White Lightning to be in the sequel.

Reynolds later said the film "was a breakthrough in that area of blending comedy and action. And it made a lot of money, so other people began trying to do the same thing. They thought, 'Well, he smashed up sixty cars and it made a lot of money, so we'll do a hundred crashes.' But that had nothing to do with its success as a comedy."

Some of film's basic themes, for example a comedic car chase centered around the transport and handling of illicit alcohol, and set in the southern United States - was taken to even greater commercial success when Reynolds and Hal Needham reunited (with Needham making his directorial debut) for Smokey and the Bandit in 1977.

== See also ==
- List of American films of 1973
