= Burt Reynolds =

American actor (1936–2018)

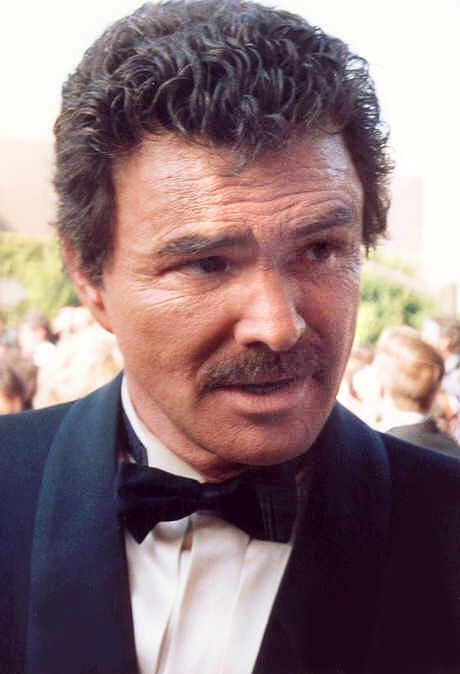
- Reynolds in 1991
- Born: Burton Leon Reynolds Jr. February 11, 1936; Lansing, Michigan, U.S.
- Died: September 6, 2018 (aged 82); Jupiter, Florida, U.S.
- Resting place: Hollywood Forever Cemetery
- Occupation: Actor
- Years active: 1956–2018
- Spouses: Judy Carne (m. 1963; div. 1965); Loni Anderson (m. 1988; div. 1994)
- Partners: Dinah Shore (1971–1975); Sally Field (1976–1982)
- Children: 1
- Website: CMG Worldwide

Burton Leon Reynolds Jr. (February 11, 1936 – September 6, 2018) was an American actor. His early work included the television series Gunsmoke (1962–1965), Hawk (1966) and Dan August (1970–1971). Following leading roles in the films Navajo Joe (1966), and 100 Rifles (1969), his breakthrough performance was as Lewis Medlock in Deliverance (1972).

Reynolds played leading roles in films such as White Lightning (1973), The Longest Yard (1974), Smokey and the Bandit (1977) (which started a seven-year box-office reign), Semi-Tough (1977), The End (1978), Hooper (1978), Starting Over (1979), Smokey and the Bandit II (1980), The Cannonball Run (1981), Sharky's Machine (1981), The Best Little Whorehouse in Texas (1982), Smokey and the Bandit III (1983), and Cannonball Run II (1984), several of which he directed. He was nominated twice for the Golden Globe Award for Best Actor in a Motion Picture – Musical or Comedy. Reynolds was voted first in the annual Top Ten Money Making Stars Poll as the world's most bankable movie star from 1978 to 1982, a five-year record he shared with Bing Crosby, Clint Eastwood, and Tom Hanks, before Tom Cruise surpassed it in 2001.

After a number of box-office failures, Reynolds returned to television. He starred in the situation comedy Evening Shade (1990–1994), for which he won a Golden Globe Award for Best Actor – Television Series Musical or Comedy and a Primetime Emmy Award for Outstanding Lead Actor in a Comedy Series. His performance as high-minded pornographer Jack Horner in Paul Thomas Anderson's Boogie Nights (1997) brought him renewed critical acclaim, earning the Golden Globe Award for Best Supporting Actor – Motion Picture, as well as nominations for an Academy Award for Best Supporting Actor, a BAFTA Award for Best Supporting Actor, and two Screen Actors Guild Awards.

== Early life ==
Burton Leon Reynolds Jr. was born on February 11, 1936, to Burton Milo Reynolds Sr. (1906–2002) and Harriet Fernette "Fern" Reynolds (née Miller, 1902–1992). His family descended from Dutch, English, Scots-Irish, and Scottish ancestry. Reynolds also claimed some Cherokee and Italian ancestry.

During his career, Reynolds often said he was born in Waycross, Georgia, although in 2015, he stated that he was actually born in Lansing, Michigan. In his autobiography, he stated that Lansing is where his family lived when his father was drafted into the United States Army.

Reynolds, his mother, and his sister joined his father at Fort Leonard Wood, Missouri, where they subsequently lived for two years. When his father was sent to Europe, the family relocated to Lake City, Michigan, where his mother had been raised. In 1946, the family relocated to Riviera Beach, Florida, where in sixth grade, Reynolds began a lifelong close friendship with Dick Howser. Reynolds's father eventually became chief of police of Riviera Beach, which is adjacent to the north end of West Palm Beach, Florida. His nickname in Riviera Beach was "Buddy".

At Palm Beach High School, Reynolds lettered in football and track and was named a first-team All-State fullback in 1953 and an honorable-mention selection to the 34th annual All-Southern team. He was initially offered a college football scholarship by University of Miami head coach Andy Gustafson, but ultimately chose to play for head coach Tom Nugent at Florida State University.

=== College ===
While at Florida State, Reynolds roomed with future college football coach, broadcaster, and analyst Lee Corso, and also became a brother in the Phi Delta Theta fraternity. Reynolds and Corso remained close friends for 64 years, staying in regular contact throughout their lives; according to Corso, they spoke about once a month and had last talked two weeks before Reynolds's death in 2018. He earned his first start of the 1954 football season at right halfback in FSU's inaugural victory of the season against the University of Louisville. Reynolds tallied a one-yard touchdown in the game. Despite suffering a separated shoulder in the middle of the season, Reynolds finished his freshman season with 16 carries for 134 rushing yards and two touchdowns. He also caught four passes for 76 yards, returned five punts, and had an interception while playing defense.

In 1955, Reynolds was slated to start in the backfield for the Seminoles (8–4 in 1954), but suffered a torn cartilage in his right knee during preseason workouts. After testing the injured knee in a "B" game versus Georgia Tech, Reynolds realized he could not make cuts like he once did and left school. "I knew then I was finished as a football player," he told The Palm Beach Post. A week later, Reynolds underwent knee surgery at St. Mary's Hospital in West Palm Beach. His surgeon predicted he could resume his playing career the following year. However, two months later, Reynolds, then 19, was critically injured in an automobile accident on Florida State Road A1A, suffering internal injuries, including a ruptured spleen, after colliding with a stalled truck. The driver of the truck fled the scene, according to the newspaper report. Reynolds said he lost a prized wristwatch from the 1955 Sun Bowl game in the crash and left his vehicle totaled.

Reynolds did not return to the Florida State campus for almost two years. To keep up with his studies, he enrolled at Palm Beach Junior College (PBJC) in neighboring Lake Park in early 1956. When Reynolds returned to Florida State in 1957, he rejoined the football team as a backup halfback, but was hampered by lingering injuries from the car accident. In an away game against Boston College, Reynolds averaged four yards on three carries and caught two passes. He was blamed, fairly or unfairly, for the team's loss to North Carolina State University on October 12, 1957. Immediately after the game, he told his teammates that he was done with football. Convinced that his playing days were over, Reynolds returned home and got engaged to Virginia Jean Hayden (1936–2013), a former beauty queen from Jacksonville, Florida, who was attending FSU. The couple did not wed. In 1959, Hayden, a speech major in college, wed FSU grad and Navy veteran Edwin Watson Richardson Jr., a car dealer in Tallahassee.

=== Early acting ===
During his spring term at PBJC in 1956, Reynolds enrolled in an English class taught by Watson B. Duncan III. Duncan encouraged Reynolds to try out for a school play he was directing called Outward Bound. He cast Reynolds in a main role based on having heard him read Shakespeare in class. Reynolds's performance earned him a best actor award at the 1956 PBJC Drama Awards. "I read two words and they gave me a lead," In his autobiography, he referred to Duncan as his mentor and the most influential person of his life.

== Career ==
=== Theater ===
The drama award Reynolds won in junior college included a scholarship to the Hyde Park Playhouse, a summer stock theater in Hyde Park, New York. Reynolds considered the opportunity as an agreeable alternative to more physically demanding summer jobs, but did not yet consider acting a potential career. While working there, Reynolds met Joanne Woodward, who helped him find an agent.

"I don't think I ever actually saw him perform," said Woodward. "I knew him as this cute, shy, attractive boy. He had the kind of lovely personality that made you want to do something for him." He was cast in Tea and Sympathy at the Neighborhood Playhouse in New York City. After his Broadway debut in Look, We've Come Through, he received favorable reviews for his performance and went on tour with the cast, driving the bus as well as appearing on stage. After the tour, Reynolds returned to New York City and enrolled in acting classes, along with Frank Gifford, Carol Lawrence, Red Buttons, and Jan Murray. "I was a working actor for two years before I finally took my first real acting class (with Wynn Handman at the Neighborhood Playhouse)," he said. "It was a lot of technique, truth, moment-to-moment, how to listen, improv."

After a botched improvisation in acting class, Reynolds briefly considered returning to Florida. Nonetheless, in December 1956, he was cast in a supporting role in a revival of Mister Roberts at the New York City Center, in which Charlton Heston played the starring role and Orson Bean played Ensign Pulver. After the play closed, director John Forsythe arranged a movie audition with Joshua Logan for Reynolds. The movie was Sayonara (1957). Reynolds was told that he could not be in the movie because he looked too much like Marlon Brando. Logan advised Reynolds to go to Hollywood, although Reynolds did not feel confident enough to do so. (Another source says that Reynolds did a screen test after studio talent agent Lew Wasserman saw the effect that Reynolds had on secretaries in his office, but the test was unsuccessful.)

While finding himself to be a struggling actor, Reynolds worked in a variety of jobs: waiting tables, washing dishes, driving a delivery truck, and even worked as a bouncer at the Roseland Ballroom. He wrote that while working as a dockworker, he was offered $150 to jump through a glass window on a live television show.

=== Early television and Riverboat ===
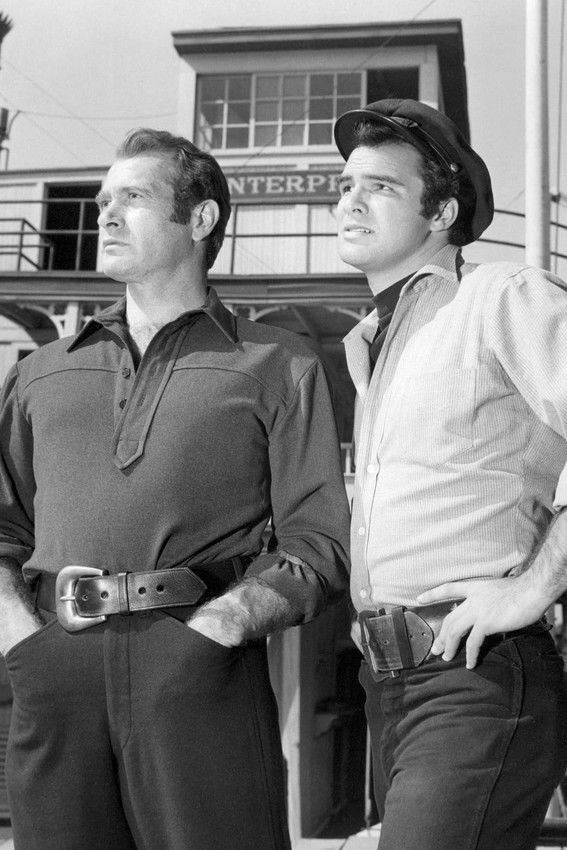
Reynolds (right) with Darren McGavin in Riverboat

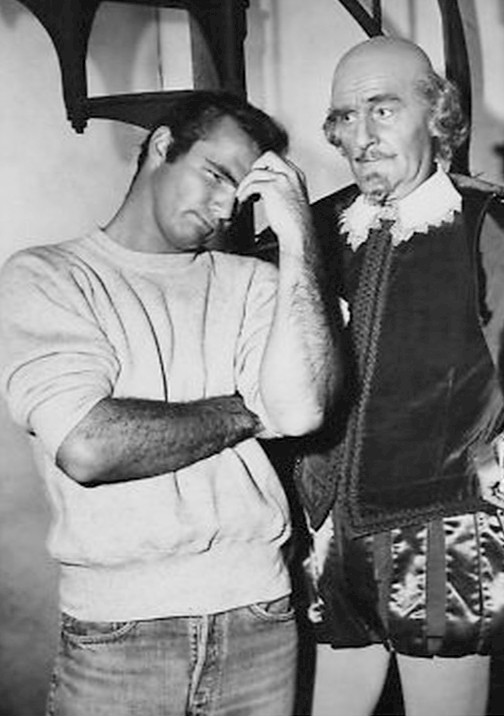
Reynolds (left) with John Williams as William Shakespeare in The Twilight Zone featuring Reynolds parodying look-alike Marlon Brando

Reynolds began acting for television during the late 1950s, with guest roles on Flight, M Squad, Schlitz Playhouse, The Lawless Years, and Pony Express. He went on to sign a seven-year contract with Universal Studios. "I don't care whether he can act or not," said Wasserman. "Anyone who has this effect on women deserves a break."

Reynolds's first big opportunity came when he was cast alongside Darren McGavin, the main actor of the television series Riverboat (1959–61), playing Ben Frazer, the boat's pilot. According to a contemporary report, Reynolds was considered "a double for Marlon Brando". The show played for two seasons, but Reynolds quit after only 20 episodes, claiming that he did not get along with McGavin nor the executive producer, and that he had "a stupid part". Subsequently, Reynolds said that he "couldn't get a job. I didn't have a very good reputation. You just don't walk out on a network television series."

Reynolds returned to being a guest in television shows. As he put it, "I played heavies in every series in town," appearing in episodes of Playhouse 90, Johnny Ringo, Alfred Hitchcock Presents, Lock-Up, The Blue Angels, Michael Shayne, Zane Grey Theatre, The Aquanauts, and The Brothers Brannagan. "They were depressing years," he later said.

Reynolds starred in the low-budget film Angel Baby (1961). He followed it up with a role in a war film Armored Command (1961). "It was the one picture that Howard Keel didn't sing on," reminisced Reynolds. "That was a terrible mistake."

In 1961, he returned to Broadway to appear in Look, We've Come Through, directed by José Quintero, but it lasted only five performances.

Reynolds continued to guest-star on episodes of Naked City, Ripcord, The Everglades, Route 66, Perry Mason, and The Twilight Zone ("The Bard", an hour-long send-up of Reynolds's look-alike Marlon Brando). He later said, "I learned more about my craft in these guest shots than I did standing around and looking virile on Riverboat."

=== Gunsmoke ===
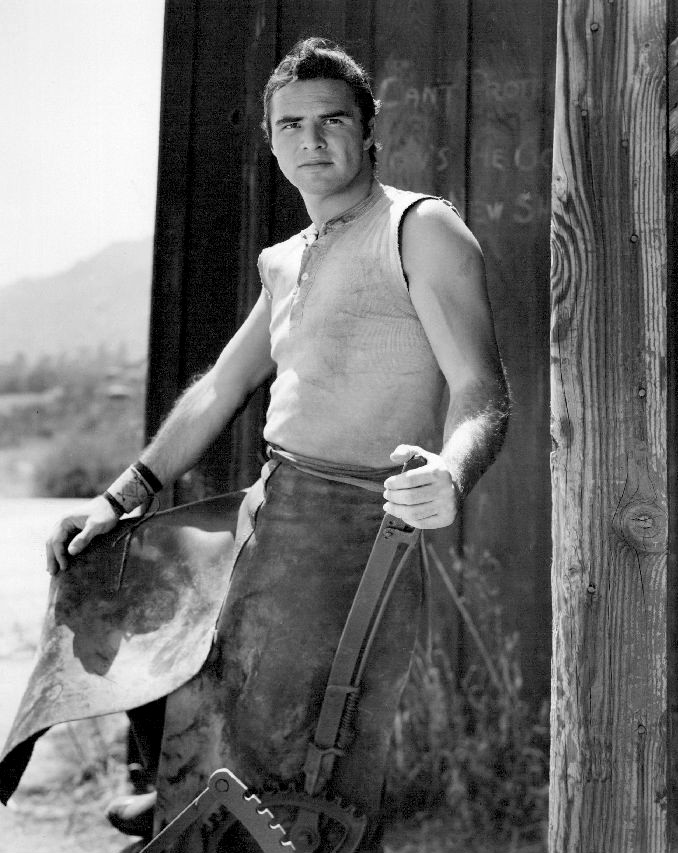
Reynolds as Quint Asper in Gunsmoke, 1962

In 1962, Dennis Weaver wanted to quit the cast of Gunsmoke, one of the top-rated shows in the country. The producers developed a new character, "half-breed" blacksmith Quint Asper. Reynolds was cast, chosen over 300 other actors. He announced that he would stay on the show "until it ends. I think it's a terrible mistake for an actor to leave a series in the middle of it." Reynolds left Gunsmoke in 1965. He later said that being in that show was "the happiest period of my life. I hated to leave that show, but I felt I had served my apprenticeship and there wasn't room for two leading men."

He was then cast in his first lead role in a movie, the low-budget action movie Operation C.I.A. (1965). He also guest-starred on the television series Flipper, The F.B.I., and 12 O'Clock High.

=== Hawk and leading roles in films ===
Reynolds was given the title role of a TV series, Hawk (1966–67), playing Native American detective John Hawk. It ran for 17 episodes before being cancelled.

He played another Native American in the spaghetti Western film Navajo Joe (1966), which was filmed in Spain. He said, "It wasn't my favorite picture." He later said, "I had two expressions—mad and madder."

He also guest-starred in Gentle Ben, and made a pilot for a TV series, Lassiter, in which he would have played a magazine journalist. It did not develop into a series.

Reynolds made a series of movies in quick succession: Shark! (1969), filmed in Mexico, was directed by Sam Fuller, who removed his name from it, after which its release was held up for a number of years. Reynolds described Fade In as "the best thing I've ever done", but it was not released for a number of years, of which director Jud Taylor took his name. Impasse (1969) was a war movie filmed in the Philippines. Reynolds plays the title role in Sam Whiskey (1969), a comic Western written by William W. Norton, which Reynolds later said was "way ahead of its time. I was playing light comedy and nobody cared."

Reynolds then starred with Jim Brown and Raquel Welch in another Western, 100 Rifles (1969). He said, "I spent the entire time refereeing fights between Jim Brown and Raquel Welch."

In a 1969 interview, Reynolds expressed interest in playing roles like the John Garfield part in The Postman Always Rings Twice, but no one gave him the opportunity. "Instead, the producer hands me a script and says 'I know it's not there now kid, but I know we can make it work.'"

Reynolds declined the leading role for the film M*A*S*H (1970), which went to Elliott Gould. He starred in the film Skullduggery (1970), filmed in Jamaica. He joked that after making "those wonderful, forgettable pictures... I suddenly realized I was as hot as Leo Gorcey."

Reynolds featured in two television films: Hunters Are for Killing (1970) and Run, Simon, Run (1970). In the former, his character was originally a Native American, but Reynolds requested that this element be changed, feeling that he had played the persona too many times already, and anyways, it was not needed for the character.

=== Dan August and talk shows ===
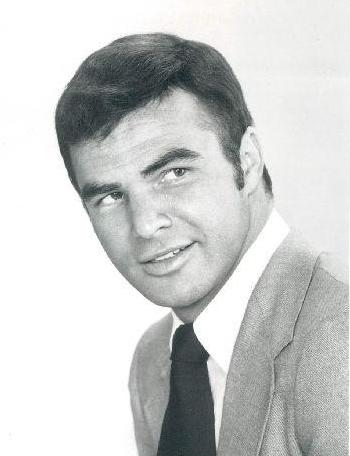
Reynolds in 1970.

Reynolds played the title character in the police television drama Dan August (1970–71), produced by Quinn Martin. Reynolds had previously guest-starred in two episodes of Martin's production The F.B.I. The series was given a full-season order of 26 episodes, based on the reputation of Martin and Reynolds, but it struggled in the ratings against Hawaii Five-0 and was not renewed.

Albert R. Broccoli asked Reynolds to play James Bond after Sean Connery, but Reynolds declined the role, saying, "An American can't play James Bond. It just can't be done."

After the cancelation of the series, Reynolds appeared in his first stage play in six years: a production of The Tender Trap at Arlington Park Theatre. He was offered other TV pilots, but was reluctant to play a detective again.

Around this time, he had become well known as a charismatic talk-show guest, starting with an appearance on The Merv Griffin Show. He made jokes at his own expense, calling himself America's most "well-known unknown", who made the kind of movies "they show in airplanes or prisons or anywhere else the people can't get out". He proved to be popular and was frequently asked back by Griffin and Johnny Carson; he also guest hosted The Tonight Show. He was so popular as a guest that he was offered his own talk show, but said he wanted to continue as an actor.

He later said that his talk-show appearances were "the best thing that ever happened to me. They changed everything drastically overnight. I spent 10 years looking virile, saying, 'Put up your hands.' After the Carson, Griffin, Frost, Dinah's show, suddenly I have a personality."

"I realized that people liked me, that I was enough," said Reynolds. "So if I could transfer that character—the irreverent, self-deprecating side of me, my favorite side of me—onto the screen, I could have a big career."

=== The Godfather and Marlon Brando feud ===
Reynolds was considered for the role of Sonny Corleone in The Godfather, but Francis Ford Coppola chose to cast James Caan in the part. Talk arose that Reynolds's participation was vetoed by Marlon Brando, who lacked respect for him. Brando denied that he played a role in thwarting the casting of Reynolds, saying in a January 1979 Playboy interview, Coppola would not have cast Reynolds in the part. Reynolds himself later claimed that he declined the role of Sonny. (The Godfather producer Albert S. Ruddy later produced The Cannonball Run and Cannonball Run II, two Reynolds movie successes during the 1980s.)

The Brando-Reynolds feud became Hollywood legend. Reynolds said that he could not understand Brando's enmity toward him. In a 2015 interview with The Guardian, Reynolds said, "He was a strange man. He didn't like me at all." He did not consciously imitate Brando, nor act like him, nor try to look like him; he even grew a mustache so that people would stop saying that he looked like Brando.

When he was finally introduced to Brando, Reynolds said that he told him that he was the finest actor in the world. Brando replied, "I wish I could say the same for you."

=== Deliverance and Cosmopolitan centerfold ===
Then came a major breakthrough for Reynolds. He was cast in a lead role in the movie Deliverance, directed by John Boorman, who cast him on the basis of a talk-show appearance. "It's the first time I haven't had a script with Paul Newman and Robert Redford's fingerprints all over it," Reynolds joked. "The producers actually came to me first."

"I've waited 15 years to do a really good movie," he said in 1972. "I made so many bad pictures. I was never able to turn anyone down. The greatest curse in Hollywood is to be a well-known unknown."

Around this time, Reynolds also gained notoriety for his well-publicized relationship with Dinah Shore, who was 20 years his senior, as well as posing nude in the April 1972 issue of Cosmopolitan. Reynolds said that he posed for Cosmopolitan for "a kick. I have a strange sense of humor," and because he knew that Deliverance was about to be released. He later expressed regret for posing for Cosmopolitan. Deliverance was a commercial and critical success, which along with talk-show appearances, helped establish Reynolds as a major movie actor. "The night of the Academy Awards, I counted a half-dozen Burt Reynolds jokes," he later said. "I had become a household name, the most talked-about star at the award show."

Reynolds was subsequently in Fuzz (1972), reuniting with Rachel Welch, and also made a cameo in Woody Allen's film Everything You Always Wanted to Know About Sex* (*But Were Afraid to Ask) (1972). He also returned to the stage, appearing in The Rainmaker at the Arlington.

Reynolds had the title role of Shamus (1973), playing a private detective. The movie drew lackluster reviews, nonetheless, it became a box-office success. Reynolds described it as "not a bad film, kind of cute". He also was in The Man Who Loved Cat Dancing (1973), co-featuring Sarah Miles. The film was a minor success, perhaps best remembered for the scandal of Miles's lover, an aspiring screenwriter, dying by suicide during the filming.

Reynolds meant to reunite with Boorman in Zardoz, but fell ill and was replaced by Sean Connery.

=== White Lightning and Southern movies ===
Another turning point in Reynolds's career came in 1973 when he made the light-hearted car-chase film written by William W. Norton, White Lightning. Reynolds later called it "the beginning of a whole series of films made in the South, about the South, and for the South... you could make back the cost of the negative just in Memphis alone. Anything outside of that was just gravy." Car-chase movies became Reynolds's most profitable genre. At the end of 1973, Reynolds was voted to the list of the 10 most-popular movie actors in the US at number four. He stayed on that list until 1984.

He also made a sports comedy with Robert Aldrich, The Longest Yard (1974), which was popular. Aldrich later said, "I think that on occasion, he's a much better actor than he's given credit for. Not always; sometimes he acts like a caricature of himself."

Reynolds starred in two big-budget fiascos: At Long Last Love (1975), a musical for Peter Bogdanovich, and Lucky Lady (1975), with Gene Hackman and Liza Minnelli. More popular was another light-hearted car-chase film, W.W. and the Dixie Dancekings (1975), and a police drama with Aldrich, Hustle (1975). He also had a cameo appearance in Mel Brooks's Silent Movie (1976).

Toward the end of his life, Reynolds revealed that he declined the role of Han Solo in Star Wars. Reynolds told Business Insider in 2016, "I just didn't want to play that kind of role at the time. Now I regret it. I wish I would have done it."

=== Directorial work ===
Reynolds made his directorial debut in 1976 with Gator, the sequel to White Lightning, written by Norton. "I waited 20 years to do it [directing] and I enjoyed it more than anything I've ever done in this business," he said after filming. "And I happen to think it's what I do best."

He was reunited with Bogdanovich for the comedy Nickelodeon (1976), which was a commercial disappointment. Aldrich later commented, "Bogdanovich can get him to do the telephone book! Anybody else has to persuade him to do something. He's fascinated by Bogdanovich. I can't understand it." He turned down the part of Clark Gable in Gable and Lombard.

=== Smokey and the Bandit and career peak ===
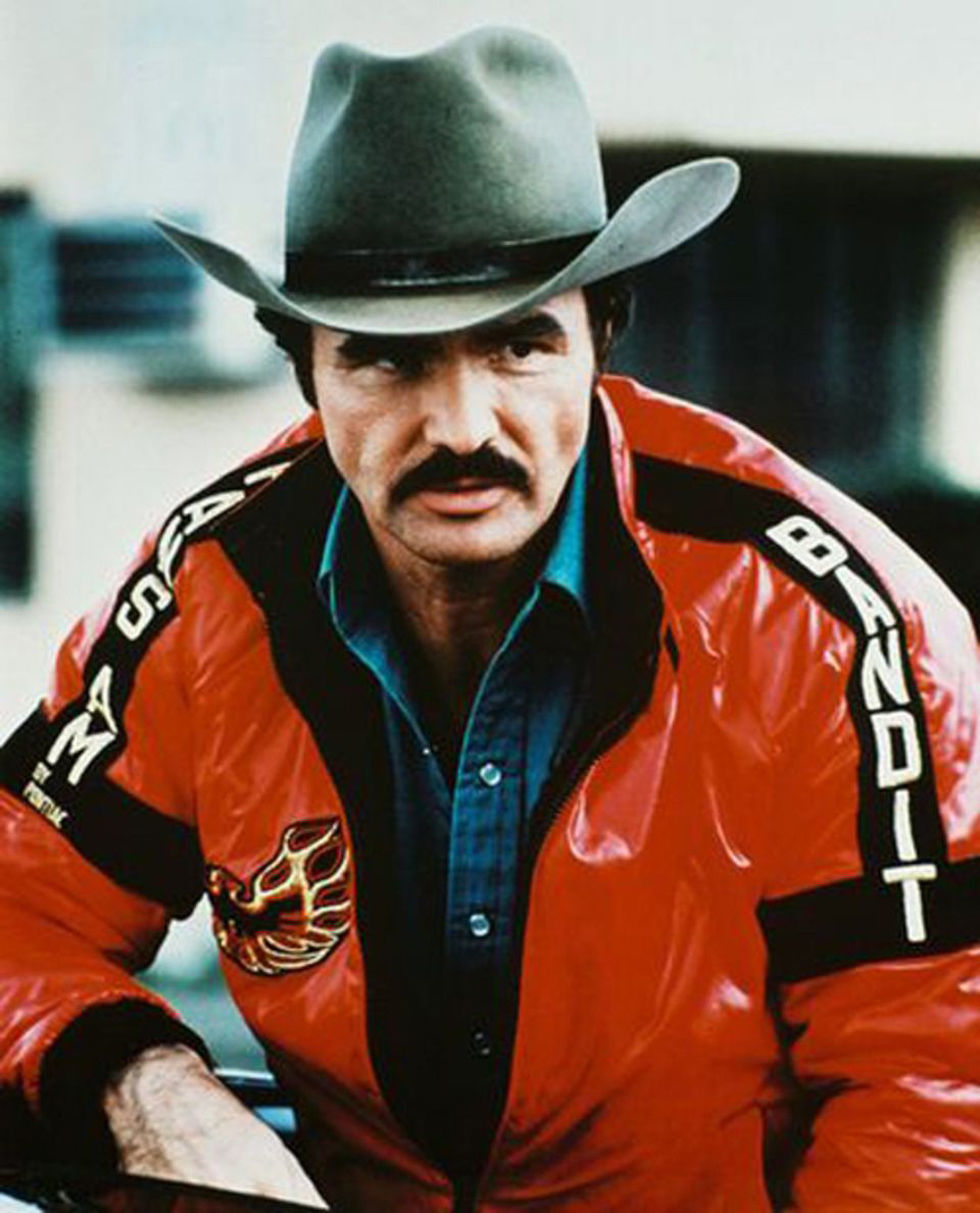
Reynolds in 1980 wearing the Bandit jacket used in Smokey and the Bandit II

Reynolds went on to have the biggest success of his career with the car-chase film Smokey and the Bandit (1977), directed by Hal Needham and co-starring Jackie Gleason, Jerry Reed, and Sally Field. He followed it with a comedy about football players, Semi-Tough (1977), featuring Jill Clayburgh and Kris Kristofferson, and produced by David Merrick. He directed his second film The End (1978), a dark comedy, playing a role originally written for Woody Allen. More popular was a comedy that he made with Needham and Field, Hooper (1978), in which he played an aging stunt man.

"My ability as an actor gets a little better every time," he said. "I'm very prolific in the amount of films I make—two-and-a-half or three a year—and when I look at any picture I do now compared to Deliverance, it's miles above what I was doing then. But when you're doing films that are somewhat similar to each other, as I've been doing, people take it for granted."

For California Suite (1978), Reynolds declined a leading role, which went to Alan Alda. Reynolds said: "I'd rather direct than act. I'd rather do that than anything. It's the second-best sensation I've ever had." He added that David Merrick had offered to produce two movies that Reynolds would direct without having to act in them."

Reynolds tried a change of pace with Starting Over (1979), a romantic comedy, co-starring Jill Clayburgh and Candice Bergen. The film is co-written and produced by James L. Brooks. Reynolds plays a jewel thief in Rough Cut (1980) produced by Merrick, who fired and rehired director Don Siegel during filming.

Reynolds had two huge successes with more car films directed by Needham: Smokey and the Bandit II (1980) and The Cannonball Run (1981). He also starred in David Steinberg's film Paternity (1981) and directed himself in an action film, Sharky's Machine (1981).

Reynolds wanted to try a musical again, and agreed to do The Best Little Whorehouse in Texas (1982). It was a box-office success, as was Best Friends (1982) with Goldie Hawn. In 1982, Reynolds was voted the most popular actor in the US for the fifth year in a row.

Around that time, he stated: "The only thing I really enjoy is this business, and I think my audience knows that. I've never been able to figure out exactly who that audience is. I know there have been a few pictures even my mother didn't go see, but there's always been an audience for them. I guess it is because they always know that I give it 100 percent, and good or bad, there's going to be quite a lot of me in that picture. That's what they're looking for. I don't have any pretensions about wanting to be Hamlet. I would just like to be the best Burt Reynolds around."

=== Career decline ===
James L. Brooks wrote the role of astronaut Garrett Breedlove in Terms of Endearment (1983) with Reynolds in mind. However, Reynolds refused the role, and instead starred in another car-chase comedy Stroker Ace (1983), directed by Needham. The Endearment part went to Jack Nicholson, who won an Academy Award for Best Supporting Actor. Reynolds said in 1987, "I felt I owed Hal more than I owed Jim," but Stroker Ace failed. Reynolds admitted that refusing that role was a mistake. "I regret that one most of all because it was a real acting part.... I wish I would have done it, and thinking back now, it was really a stupid decision, but I made a lot of stupid decisions in that period. It must have been my stupid period."

In 1983, an unnamed producer said that while Reynolds's salaries would not decrease because of Stroker Ace's failure, "if two or three more such pictures don't work, people will just stop putting him in that kind of movie and that's the kind of film for which he gets paid the most". Reynolds felt that it was a turning point in his career from which he never recovered. "That's where I lost them," he said of his fans.

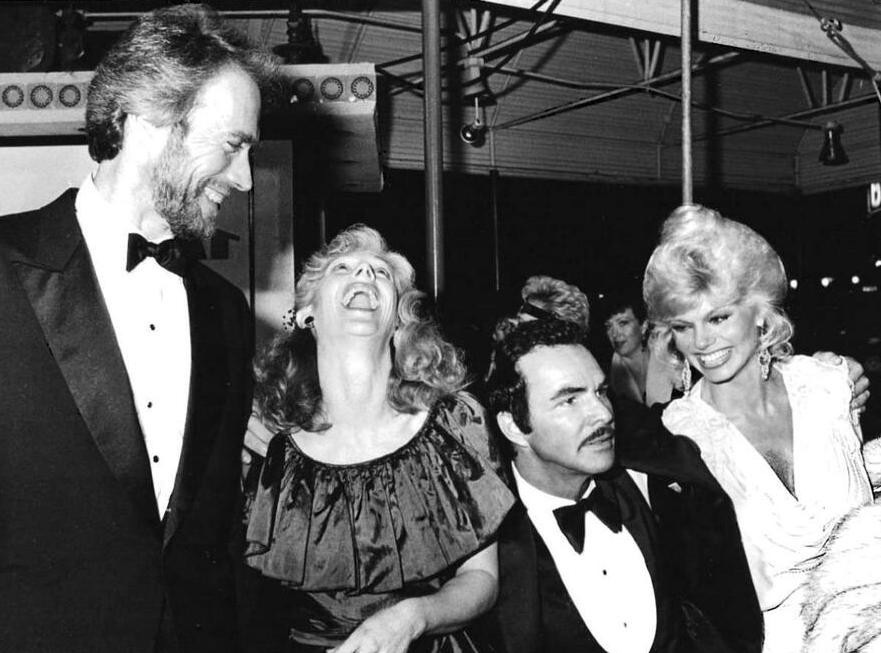
Clint Eastwood, Sondra Locke, Burt Reynolds, and Loni Anderson at the premiere of City Heat (1984)

For director Blake Edwards, Reynolds starred in The Man Who Loved Women (1983), a remake in English of François Truffaut's 1977 film L'Homme qui aimait les femmes, but it also failed. In an interview at about this time, he said: "Getting to the top has turned out to be a hell of a lot more fun than staying there. I've got Tom Selleck crawling up my back. I'm in my late 40s. I realize I have four or five more years where I can play certain kinds of parts and get away with it. That's why I'm leaning more and more toward directing and producing. I don't want to be stumbling around town doing Gabby Hayes parts a few years from now. I'd like to pick and choose and maybe go work for a perfume factory like Mr. Cary Grant, and look wonderful with everybody saying, 'Gee, I wish he hadn't retired'.

Cannonball Run II (1984), directed by Needham, brought in some money, but only half of the original. City Heat (1984), which teamed Reynolds with Clint Eastwood, was mildly popular, but was considered a major critical and box-office disappointment. Reynolds was injured badly during filming when he was hit in the jaw with a real chair instead of a breakaway prop, causing him excruciating and chronic pain, as well as a sharp weight loss that resulted in rumors circulating for years that he had AIDS.

Reynolds returned to directing with Stick (1985), from an Elmore Leonard novel, but it was both a critical and commercial failure. So, too, were three other action movies that he made: Heat (1986), based on a novel by William Goldman, Malone (1987), and Rent-a-Cop (1987) with Liza Minnelli. He later said that he did Heat and Malone "because there were so many rumors about me [having AIDS]. I had to get out and be seen."

In 1987, Reynolds teamed with Bert Convy to co-produce the game show Win, Lose or Draw for Burt and Bert Productions. The show was based on "sketch pad charades", a game that he often played with his friends in his living room in Jupiter. Vicki Lawrence hosted the daytime version for NBC, while Convy hosted the syndicated version until 1989, when he quit to host 3rd Degree, also created by Reynolds and Convy.

Reynolds starred in Switching Channels (1988), a remake of the comedy The Front Page. It was a box-office bomb. Even more poorly received was Physical Evidence (1989), directed by Michael Crichton. Reynolds received excellent reviews for the caper comedy Breaking In (1989), but the commercial reception was poor. The moderately successful animated film All Dogs Go to Heaven (1989), in which Reynolds voiced Charlie B. Barkin, was one of his few successes at the time. "When I was doing very well," he said at the time, "I wasn't conscious I was doing very well, but I became very conscious when I wasn't doing very well. The atmosphere changed."

=== Return to TV: B.L. Stryker and Evening Shade ===
Reynolds returned to television with the detective series with B.L. Stryker (1989–90). It ran two seasons, during which time Reynolds played a supporting part in Modern Love (1990).

Reynolds starred in the situation comedy television series, Evening Shade (1990–94) as former Pittsburgh Steelers player Woodward "Wood" Newton. The series was a considerable success, with 98 episodes over four seasons. This role earned him a Primetime Emmy Award for Outstanding Lead Actor in a Comedy Series. Reynolds credited this role for his membership in Steeler Nation. During his tenure on Evening Shade, Reynolds participated in other projects, starting with a cameo in The Player (1992) (playing himself complaining about people in Hollywood).

Reynolds starred in the crime film Cop and a Half (1993). On August 25, the Randy Travis television special Wind in the Wire first aired; Reynolds was among the guests. On October 15, CBS first broadcast the television movie The Man from Left Field, co-featuring Reba McEntire. Reynolds starred and directed.

=== Character actor ===
After Evening Shade ended in 1994, Reynolds played the lead in a horror movie, The Maddening (1995). He gradually became more of a character actor, though; he had a major supporting role in Citizen Ruth (1996), an early work from Alexander Payne, and Striptease (1996) with Demi Moore. Reynolds had to audition for Striptease. The movie's producer later said, "To be honest, we were not enthusiastic at first. There was the hair and his reputation, but we were curious... At the first audition, on the first day, Burt had to take off his toupee in front of six or seven people. It was tough for him, but he did it. It was a very, very humbling thing to do, but by the end of the audition, it was really clear that Burt was the guy." "I knew I could play him," said Reynolds. "I could make him likable and dangerous. There are very few people who can do that. I always played likable and dangerous. I had a persona. Unfortunately, my persona became bigger than my acting." Reynolds accepted a salary of $350,000; lower than what he had been paid earlier in his career." Reynolds got the role and earned some strong reviews for his performance, and the film was successful at the box office although it was panned by critics. Reynolds based his performance as Congressman Dilbeck on politicians he knew from his youth, as his father was a police chief and prominent local Republican.

Reynolds was a supporting actor in Frankenstein and Me (1996), Mad Dog Time (1996), The Cherokee Kid (1996), Meet Wally Sparks (1997) with Rodney Dangerfield, and Bean (1997) with Rowan Atkinson. He had the lead in Raven (1996), a straight-to-video action movie. About this time, he claimed he was depleted financially, having spent $13 million.

In 1996, Reynolds's agent said "Regarding Burt, there's a split between the executives in town who are under 40 and those who are over 40. The younger executives are more open to Burt because they grew up loving Deliverance. But the older executives remember how crazy he was, and they are less receptive." He also hosted segments for the Encore Action premium cable network during the late 1990s and 2000s.

=== Boogie Nights and career revival ===
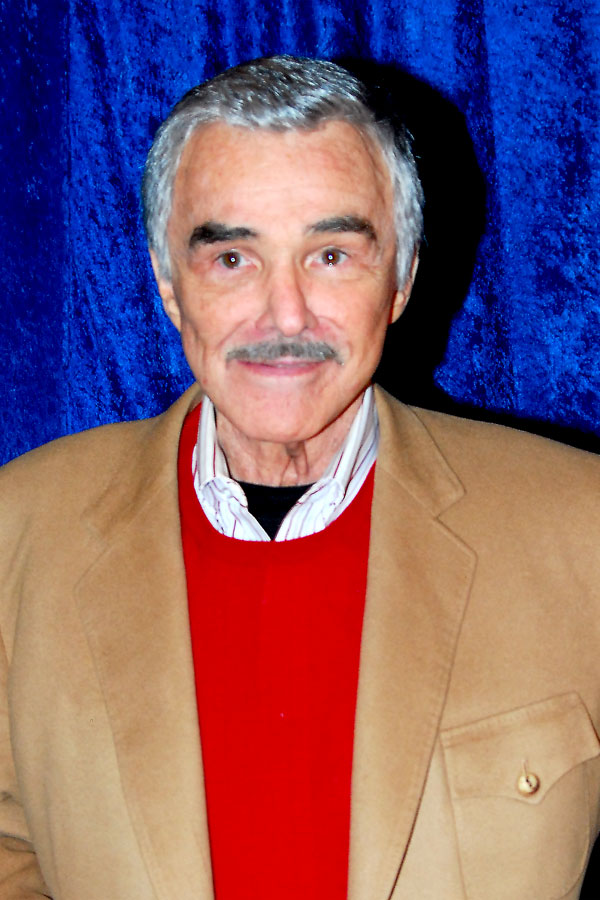
Reynolds in 2011.

Reynolds played a porn film director in the successful film Boogie Nights (1997), which was considered a comeback role for him. He received 12 acting awards and three nominations for the role, including a nomination for the Academy Award for Best Supporting Actor, Reynolds's first and only nomination for the award. Despite the acclaim, Reynolds disliked working in the film, particularly not getting along with writer-director Paul Thomas Anderson, and reportedly dismissed his agent for recommending it. Boogie Nights co-star William H. Macy stated in an interview that Reynolds was clueless about the film and had become out of touch with the film industry due to his age.

Reynolds was offered a role in Anderson's third film, Magnolia (1999), but he declined it. In 2012, he clarified he did not hate Boogie Nights itself and called it "extraordinary", saying his opinion of the film has nothing to do with his relationship with Anderson. In his second autobiography, But Enough About Me (2015), Reynolds attempted to come to terms with his difficult nature. In a 2015 GQ interview, he said that his problem with Anderson was a matter of their differing personalities:

I think mostly because he was young and full of himself. Every shot we did, it was like the first time [that shot had ever been done]. I remember the first shot we did in Boogie Nights, where I drive the car to Grauman's Theater. After he said, "Isn't that amazing?" And I named five pictures that had the same kind of shot. It wasn't original. But if you have to steal, steal from the best.

Despite his Oscar nomination for Boogie Nights and a new appreciation of his acting talent by movie critics, Reynolds failed to return to the A list; while work was plentiful, prestige projects were lacking.

He had the lead in Big City Blues (1997) and supporting roles in Universal Soldier II: Brothers in Arms (1998) and Universal Soldier III: Unfinished Business (1998).

Reynolds returned to directing with Hard Time (1998), an action TV movie featuring himself. It resulted in two sequels, which he did not direct: Hard Time: The Premonition (1999) and Hard Time: Hostage Hotel (1999) (the latter directed by Hal Needham).

He featured in the straight-to-video The Hunter's Moon (1999), Stringer (1999), and Waterproof (2000). He played supporting roles in Pups (1999) and Mystery, Alaska (1999), and had the lead in The Crew (2000) alongside Richard Dreyfuss.

Reynolds directed The Last Producer (2000), featuring himself, and was second-billed in Renny Harlin's Driven (2001), featuring Sylvester Stallone. He was also in Tempted (2001), Hotel (2001) (directed by Mike Figgis), and The Hollywood Sign (2001).

He voiced Avery Carrington in Grand Theft Auto: Vice City, released in 2002.

Reynolds was top-billed in Snapshots with Julie Christie, an $11-million Anglo-Dutch-American picture that failed to find a wide release. He also featured in Time of the Wolf (2002) and Hard Ground (2003), and had supporting roles in Johnson County War (2002) with Tom Berenger, and Miss Lettie and Me (2003) with Mary Tyler Moore.

He was in a series of supporting roles that referred to his earlier performances: Without a Paddle (2004), a riff on his role in Deliverance, The Longest Yard (2005), a remake of his 1974 success with Adam Sandler playing Reynolds's old role (while Reynolds played the Michael Conrad part from the original); and The Dukes of Hazzard (2005) as Boss Hogg as a reference to his performances in 1970s car-chase movies.

Reynolds continued to play lead roles in movies such as Cloud 9 (2006), Forget About It (2006), Deal (2008), and A Bunch of Amateurs (2008), and supporting parts in End Game (2006), Grilled (2006), Broken Bridges (2006), In the Name of the King (2007), Not Another Not Another Movie (2011), and Reel Love (2011).

He had a guest role in an episode of Burn Notice, "Past and Future Tense" (2010). Reynolds voiced himself as the mayor of Steelport in Saints Row: The Third, released in 2011. Players can recruit Reynolds as a "homie", depending on their in-game choices. Reynolds also voiced himself in the animated series Archer, in the episode "The Man from Jupiter" (2012). The character of Sterling Archer was largely inspired by Burt Reynolds.

He was top billed in Category 5 (2014) and Elbow Grease (2016) and could be seen in key roles in Pocket Listing (2016), and Hollow Creek (2015). He returned to a regular role on TV in Hitting the Breaks (2016), but it ran for only 10 episodes. He was in Apple of My Eye (2016) and took the lead in The Last Movie Star (2017).

In May 2018, Reynolds joined the cast of Quentin Tarantino's movie Once Upon a Time in Hollywood as George Spahn (an 80-year-old blind man who rented out his ranch to Charles Manson), but he died before filming his scenes and was replaced by Bruce Dern. As well, Reynolds was cast in Roger Steinmann`s international feature PhonY as a crippled ex-astronaut overusing his cell phones. Reynold`s scenes were scheduled to be filmed in Hollywood back-to-back with Tarantino. Due to his untimely death, the already-to-70% shot international film failed completion since.

=== Posthumous releases ===
Reynolds appeared posthumously in the 2020 movie Defining Moments, which includes his final performance.

=== Other ventures ===
Reynolds was credited as the author of a 1972 mass-market paperback book Hot Line: The Letters I Get...And Write! that featured seminude "beefcake" photos of the actor, playing up his image as a male sex symbol. He also published two autobiographies: My Life in 1994 and But Enough About Me in 2015.

Reynolds co-authored the 1997 children's book, Barkley Unleashed: A Pirate's Tail, a "whimsical tale [that] illustrates the importance of perseverance, the wonders of friendship and the power of imagination".

In 1973, Reynolds released the country/easy listening album Ask Me What I Am. He also sang in two movie musicals: At Long Last Love (1975) and The Best Little Whorehouse in Texas (1982).

== Personal life ==
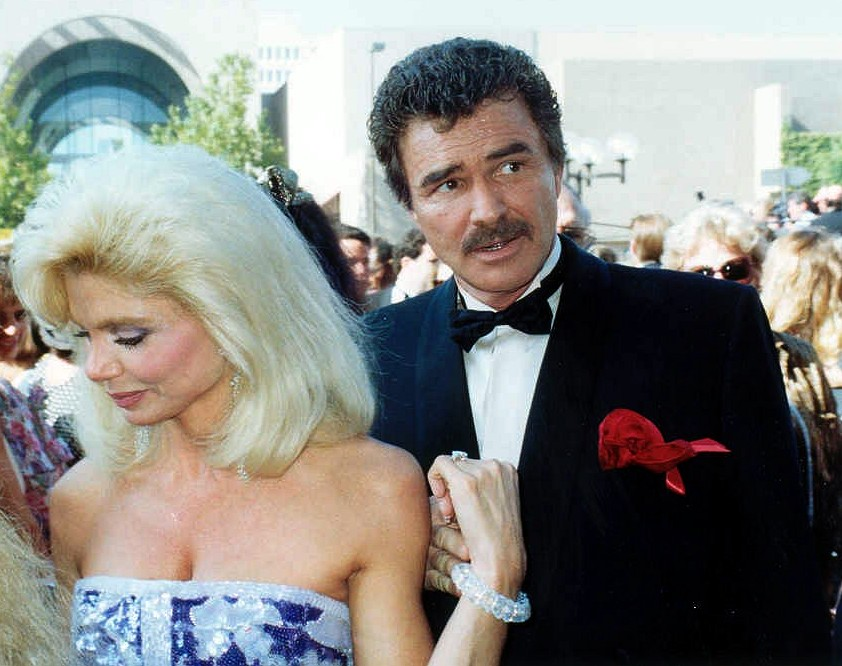
Reynolds and Loni Anderson at the 43rd Primetime Emmy Awards in 1991.

In college, Reynolds "was so good-looking, I used him as bait," college roommate Lee Corso recalled. "He'd walk across campus and bring back two girls, one beautiful and one ugly; I got the ugly girl. His ugly girlfriends were better than anyone I could get on my own."

=== Marriages and long-term relationships ===
Reynolds was married to English actress Judy Carne from 1963 to 1965. He lived with actress Miko Mayama from 1968 to 1971. American singer-actress Dinah Shore and he were in a relationship from early 1971 until 1975. In the mid-1970s, Reynolds briefly dated singer Tammy Wynette.

He had a relationship from 1976 to 1980 (then off-and-on until 1982) with American actress Sally Field, during which time they appeared together in four films. In 2016, he said that he regarded Field as the love of his life.

Reynolds was married to American actress Loni Anderson from 1988 to 1994. They had an adopted son, Quinton. Anderson and he separated after he became infatuated with a cocktail waitress, Pam Seals, with whom he later traded lawsuits, which were settled out of court.

=== Business endeavors ===
==== Professional sports ====
A lifelong fan of American football, he once told Johnny Carson on The Tonight Show he would rather have played in the NFL than win an Oscar. Reynolds was a minority owner of the Tampa Bay Bandits of the USFL from 1982 to 1986. The team's name was inspired by the Smokey and the Bandit trilogy and Skoal Bandit, a primary sponsor for the team as a result of also sponsoring Reynolds's motor-racing team.

Reynolds co-owned a NASCAR Winston Cup Series team, Mach 1 Racing, with Hal Needham, which ran the No. 33 Skoal Bandit car with driver Harry Gant.

==== Restaurants and dinner theater ====
During the late 1970s, Reynolds opened Burt's Place, a nightclub restaurant in the Omni International Complex in the Hotel District of downtown Atlanta. The establishment closed after a year. ("Burt's Place" also was the name of a building that was part of the guesthouse complex at Reynolds's Tequesta, Florida, estate in Palm Beach County, Florida.)

He also owned the Burt Reynolds Dinner Theatre in Jupiter, Florida, with an emphasis on training young performers trying to enter show business. The theater opened in 1979 and was later renamed the Burt Reynolds Jupiter Theater. Reynolds operated it until 1989 and leased it until 1996. It had a series of ownership changes until becoming the Maltz Jupiter Theatre in 2004.

In 1984, he opened a restaurant in Fort Lauderdale, named Burt & Jacks, which he co-owned with Jack Jackson. The restaurant was defunct at the time of his death.

Partnering with Killen Music Group owner Buddy Killen, Reynolds invested in Po' Folks, a chain of country-cooking, family-style restaurants located in Florida, Louisiana, and Texas. The chain, which was named after a Bill Anderson song, along with subsequent Killen-Reynolds investment in another Southern restaurant chain, failed.

=== Personal bankruptcy ===
During the height of his movie career, Reynolds made as much as $10 million a year (roughly equivalent to $49,400,000 in 2025), but he proved to be a poor businessman. Along with music industry executive Buddy Killen, who produced his 1973 country and western/easy listening album Ask Me What I Am, Reynolds invested in Po' Folks, a Southern regional restaurant chain named after a Bill Anderson song. As Po' Folks failed, Reynolds and Killen invested in another regional chain, Daisy's Diner, which also failed. Reynolds had invested the capital as an individual, not as a corporate investment, and was responsible personally for the liabilities when Po' Folks and the Daisy's Diner failed. In all, his investments in the restaurant industry resulted in losses of $20 million.

Reynolds suffered a steep decrease of his career earnings after the cancellation of Evening Shade, as his popularity waned due to bad publicity from his divorce from Loni Anderson, which became tabloid fodder. His decrease of earnings as an actor plus the great expense of his divorce settlement, child support, and alimony payments to Anderson caused a cash depletion by the mid-1990s.

CBS, the network that produced Evening Shade and managed the program's syndication, sued him for failing to repay a $3.7 million loan in 1996. Subsequently, he filed for Chapter 11 bankruptcy, due in part to an extravagant lifestyle, a divorce from Anderson, and failed investments in restaurant chains. Reynolds emerged from bankruptcy two years later. During his bankruptcy proceedings, Reynolds listed $6.65 million in assets against debts totaling $11.2 million.

On August 16, 2011, Merrill Lynch Credit Corporation filed foreclosure papers, claiming Reynolds owed US$1.2 million on his home in Hobe Sound, Florida.

Until its sale during bankruptcy, he owned the Burt Reynolds Ranch, where scenes for Smokey and the Bandit were filmed and which once had a petting zoo. In April 2014, the 153-acre (62 ha) rural property was rezoned for residential use and the Palm Beach County school system was empowered to sell it, which it did to residential developer K. Hovnanian Homes.

=== Health problems ===
Reynolds suffered from hypoglycemia, which he discussed publicly on The Tonight Show Starring Johnny Carson. During his numerous appearances on The Tonight Show, Reynolds also told Johnny Carson that he suffered from anxiety.

The Stuntmen's Association of Motion Pictures awarded the Richard "Diamond" Farnsworth Award to Reynolds in 2015. Richard Farnsworth was a stunt man who made the transition into a successful acting career. Having performed stunts early during his career, the debilitating health problems of an aging stunt man was central to the storyline of Reynolds's 1978 movie Hooper, which is subtitled on the poster "The Greatest Stuntman Alive." Reynolds, who said he was a card-carrying member of the stunt performers guild, often performed his own stunts in movies, such as the fall over the waterfall in Deliverance, where he injured his coccyx. He also had to be operated on for a hernia that resulted from a fight scene in The Man Who Loved Cat Dancing.

His worst on-set injury occurred while filming City Heat in 1984; Reynolds was struck in the face with a metal chair on the first day of filming, which resulted in temporomandibular joint dysfunction. He was restricted to a liquid diet and lost 30 pounds from not eating. The painkillers he was prescribed resulted in addiction, which lasted several years.

He underwent back surgery in 2009 and a quintuple coronary artery bypass surgery in February 2010.

== Death and tributes ==
Reynolds died of a heart attack at the Jupiter Medical Center in Jupiter, Florida, on September 6, 2018, at the age of 82. His ex-wife Loni Anderson and their son Quinton held a private memorial service for Reynolds at a funeral home in North Palm Beach, Florida, on September 20. Those in attendance included Sally Field, FSU coach Bobby Bowden, friend Lee Corso, and quarterback Doug Flutie. Reynolds's body was cremated and his ashes were given to his niece, Nancy Lee Brown Hess. He was subsequently interred at Hollywood Forever Cemetery on February 11, 2021. In September of that year, a bronze bust of Reynolds was placed at the Hollywood Forever Cemetery.

On the day of Reynolds's death, Antenna TV, which broadcasts The Tonight Show nightly, broadcast an episode of The Tonight Show Starring Johnny Carson from February 11, 1982, featuring an interview and a This Is Your Life-style skit with Reynolds. The local media in Atlanta and elsewhere in the state noted on their television news programs that evening that he was the first to make major movies in Georgia, all of which were successful, which helped make the state one of the top filming locations in the country. The Florida State football team honored Reynolds with helmet decals reading "BAN ONE", in the design and style of the license plate of the Trans Am from Smokey and the Bandit, plus Reynolds's signature, worn for the rest of the 2018 season. His niece, Nancy Lee Hess, produced a 2020 biography and documentary about Reynolds titled I Am Burt Reynolds.

== Legacy and appraisal ==
During the height of his career, Reynolds was considered a male sex symbol and icon of American masculinity. Stephen Dalton wrote in The Hollywood Reporter that Reynolds "always seemed to embody an uncomplicated, undiluted, effortlessly likable strain of American masculinity that was driven much more by sunny mischief than angsty machismo." Reynolds's roles were often defined by his larger-than-life physicality and masculinity, contrasted with juvenile, but self-aware humor. Though he was not considered a serious dramatic actor during his heyday, his later career was defined by performances that often referenced his own reputation, creating what Dalton called "sophisticated, soulful performances".

Michael Chiklis has credited Reynolds for rescuing his acting career when Reynolds hired him for a role in B.L. Stryker after Chiklis was "blackballed" for his involvement in portraying John Belushi in the movie Wired (1989). Chiklis said that Reynolds knew what Chiklis was going through because he "grew up during the McCarthy era and didn't believe in blackballing."

== Accolades ==
Reynolds was nominated twice for the Emmy Award for Outstanding Lead Actor in a Comedy Series in 1991 and 1992 for Evening Shade, winning in 1991 and losing to Craig T. Nelson in Coach the next year.

He was nominated for a Best Supporting Actor Oscar in 1998, losing out to Robin Williams in Good Will Hunting.

Reynolds won Golden Globe Awards for Best Actor in a Television Series-Musical or Comedy for Evening Shade in 1992, and as Best Supporting Actor in Boogie Nights in 1998. He also was nominated for a Golden Globe as Best Actor in a Television Series-Drama for Dan August in 1971, as Best Actor in a Motion Picture-Musical or Comedy for The Longest Yard in 1975 and as Best Actor in a Motion Picture-Musical/Comedy for Starting Over in 1980. He also received Best Actor in a TV series nominations for Evening Shade in 1991 and 1993.

Reynolds won four People's Choice Awards, as Favorite Motion Picture Actor and Favorite All-Around Male in 1983, as Favorite Motion Picture Actor (tied with Clint Eastwood) in 1984, and as Favorite Male Performer in a New TV Series in 1991.

In 2015, the Stuntmen's Association of Motion Pictures awarded Reynolds the Richard "Diamond" Farnsworth Award, named after Richard Farnsworth, the career stunt man who made the transition into a successful acting career.

He was awarded an honorary doctorate from Florida State University in 1981 and later endorsed the construction of a new performing arts facility in Sarasota, Florida.

There is a Burt Reynolds Park in Jupiter, Florida, maintained by Palm Beach County.

== Bibliography ==
Title	Year	Category	Info	ISBN
Hot Line: The Letters I Get...And Write!	1972	non-fiction	New York: Signet	ASIN B000X0USY0
My Life	1994	Autobiography	New York: Hyperion.	978-0-7868-6130-9
Seminole Seasons	1994	Sports	Dallas: Taylor Publishing Company	978-0-8783-3869-6
Barkley Unleashed: A Pirate's Tail	1997	Children's book	Dove Kids Book & Audio	978-0-7871-1027-7
But Enough About Me: A Memoir	2015	Autobiography	G.P. Putnam's Sons	978-0-3991-7354-7

== Discography ==
- Ask Me What I Am (1973)

=== Singles ===
Year	Title	Chart positions			Album	Songwriter
Year	Title	US Country	US	CAN Country	Album	Songwriter
1980	"Let's Do Something Cheap and Superficial"	51	88	33	Smokey and the Bandit 2: Original Soundtrack	Richard Levinson
1982	"Sneakin' Around" (with Dolly Parton)	-*	-*	-*	The Best Little Whorehouse in Texas (soundtrack)	Dolly Parton

== See also ==
- Sasha Gabor, adult film star who was a lookalike of Burt Reynolds
