= Trader Horn (1973 film) =

1973 film by Reza Badiyi

- French theatrical poster
- Directed by: Reza Badiyi
- Written by: Edward Harper; Ethelreda Lewis (novel); William W. Norton
- Produced by: Lewis J. Rachmil
- Starring: Rod Taylor; Anne Heywood; Jean Sorel
- Cinematography: Ronald W. Browne
- Edited by: George Folsey, Jr.
- Music by: Shelly Manne
- Distributed by: Metro-Goldwyn-Mayer
- Release date: June 1973
- Running time: 101 minutes
- Country: United States
- Language: English
- Box office: $180,934 (US)

Trader Horn is a 1973 Metrocolor film directed by Reza Badiyi and starring Rod Taylor as the African adventurer Alfred Aloysius Horn. It is a remake (or perhaps more accurately a reboot) of the 1931 film, also released by Metro-Goldwyn-Mayer. Neither picture is faithful to the original memoirs of Horn, who was 53 when World War I began.

== Plot ==
During World War I, Alfred Aloysius "Trader" Horn leads an expedition in search of a platinum mine in an unexplored region of Africa. The trio encounter warring natives, rhinos and lions. They travel through jungle, swamps, and desert. They are pursued by German soldiers wanting the platinum for the war effort and by a British officer hunting Horn as a traitor.

== Cast ==
- Rod Taylor (VF : Jean Claude Michel) as Alfred Aloysius "Trader" Horn
- Anne Heywood as Nicole Mercer
- Jean Sorel as Emil DuMond
- Don Knight as Colonel Sinclair
- Ed Bernard as Apague
- Stack Pierce as Malugi
- Erik Holland as Lt. Medford
- Robert Miller Driscoll as Alfredo
- Solomon Karriem as Red Sun
- Ji-Tu Cumbuka as Orange Stripe
- Willie Harris as Blue Star
- Caro Kenyatta as Umbopa
- Oliver Givens as Dancer
- Curt Lowens as Schmidt
- John Siegfried as German Officer

== Production ==
The movie was originally announced as a big budget production for MGM-EMI.

The film was primarily shot on the backlot at the Metro-Goldwyn-Mayer studios in Culver City, California. The script, set during the First World War, ignores the plot of the largely fictitious 1931 film about the discovery of a white jungle queen. The new story is written to use colourised footage from the MGM films King Solomon's Mines (1950), and Mogambo (1953). Rod Taylor felt, with the end of the Vietnam War, the time was right for old-fashioned hero movies to make a comeback.

The anti-hero image was stretched as far as it could go. I think people now want to see a good guy win out over the bad guys through intelligence, courage and strength – the traditional makeup of hero types.

— Rod Taylor

Rod Taylor performed his own stunt riding on a zebra in the picture, actually taming the animal in the process.

== See also ==
- List of American films of 1973
