= John J. Siegfried =

American economist

John J. Siegfried (born in Allentown, Pennsylvania, on February 23, 1945) is an American economist and Emeritus Professor of Economics at Vanderbilt University. He is one of the world's leading education economists in terms of research output.

== Biography ==
A native of Allentown, Pennsylvania, John J. Siegfried earned a B.Sc. from Rensselaer Polytechnic Institute in economics in 1967, a M.A. in economics from Pennsylvania State University in 1969, and a Ph.D. in economics from the University of Wisconsin–Madison (UW) in 1972.

After obtaining his Ph.D., Siegfried became an assistant professor of economics at Vanderbilt University, with which he remained affiliated throughout his academic career, being promoted to associate professor in 1975, full professor in 1981, chairing the Department of Economics (1980–1986), and being emerited in 2010. Additionally, he also worked intermittently at Vanderbilt University as lecturer in law (1973–1981) and as adjunct professor in management (1979–1987; 1996–1997). Beyond Vanderbilt University, Siegfried has been a visiting professor at Simon Fraser University, the University of Leeds and especially the University of Adelaide. Other professional activities included work with the U.S. Federal Trade Commission, the U.S. President's Council of Economic Advisers, the Committee on Economic Education of the American Economic Association (which he chaired in 1988–1993), presidencies of the Southern Economic Association (1996) and Midwest Economic Association (2000–2001) and of the Society of Economic Educators (2014–15), and directorships on the boards of the National Bureau of Economic Research (1997–2012) and the National Council on Economic Education (1998–present). In terms of editorial work, Siegfried has sat or sits on the editorial boards of the Journal of Sports Economics, Journal of Economic Education, Review of Industrial Organization, Quarterly Review of Economics and Finance, Australian Economic Papers, and Australasian Journal of Economic Education.

== Research ==
John Siegfried's research interests include the economics of higher education, economic education, sports economics, industrial organization, and antitrust economics. In terms of research output, he is among the top 2% of economists registered on IDEAS/RePEc and belongs to the most-cited education economists.

=== Research on the economics education ===
The study and improvement of economic education has been a core topic in Siegfried's research. Reviewing the research on teaching economics in (mainly U.S.) colleges written until the late 1970s with Rendigs Fels, he surveys the measurement of inputs and outputs in economics education, the impacts of human capital, the college environment and of alternative teaching methods on economics education, and the long-term effects of economic education on students. Siegfried and Fels conclude that "different students learn economics in different ways" and that thus "the best teaching strategy provides alternative learning methods directed towards the different needs of different student". They find positive impacts for computer-study-management programmes (including frequent testing and adapted assignments) and programmed learning, but are less positive about the use of self-paced instruction and computerized games in economic education, and argue that graduate students are generally as good teachers as regular faculty, but would benefit from teacher training. In a survey of the scant research on male-female differences in economic education produced until 1979, Siegfried finds few differences between genders in terms of learning and understanding of economics at the elementary school level, though gaps appear to develop in high school and persist through the college years without further widening. In the early 1990s, together with other economic educators such as Deirdre McCloskey, Siegfried made the case for reforming economics majors, which they suggested to consist of (i) a strong introductory sequence oriented towards application, (ii) rigorous intermediate theory courses involving economic analysis, (iii) background courses in mathematics and quantitative methods, (iv) at least five electives, and (v) a capstone experience (e.g. a thesis). Moreover, in the late 1990s, Siegfried and Michael Salemi called on universities, among else, to offer economics as part of general education, to revise economics curricula to foster students' proficiency in economics (more particularly, the "Hansen proficiencies") by applying economics in the classroom, and to teach economic faculty teaching methods besides lecturing. In 2002, Hansen, Salemi, and Siegfried argued for a stronger emphasis on economic literacy (laying the ground work for Literacy-Targeted Instruction in Economics): “A Principles course targeted to literacy must focus more on basic concepts than today’s courses and texts do. Educational resources released by limiting the number of topics must be used to deepen student understanding of core ideas” (p. 466). More recently, Siegfried, Allen Sanderson and Peter McHenry have criticized the quality of economic impact studies of colleges and universities, arguing that they often overestimate local returns on investment due to inadequate counterfactuals and pointing to the definitions of the "local" area and "new" expenditures, the double-counting of economic impacts, problems with local taxes and the omission of local spillovers through increased human capital as common problems in such studies.

=== Research in sports economics and other research ===
In sports economics, Siegfried has applied production theory to professional basketball in the U.S. (with Cliff Huang and Thomas Zak), studied the demand for minor league baseball (with Jeff Eisenberg), the economics of sports facilities and their communities (with Andrew Zimbalist), and the concerns for competitive balance in sports in general and in baseball in particular (with Allen R. Sanderson). Other studies, in particular in industrial organization, concern topics such as corporate taxation, corporate lobbying, and patterns of firm exit and entry; in the last, co-authored with Laurie Beth Evans, Siegfried finds that firm exits accelerate face to lower profits and a lower capital-intensity while entry is more frequent in profitable, high-growth industries with low requirements in terms of investment capital, with both firm exit and entry being highly correlated (possibly) due to displacement and vacuum effects.

== Bibliography ==
- Clotfelter, C.T., Ehrenberg, R.G., Getz, M., Siegfried, J.J. (1991, eds.). Economic Challenges in Higher Education. Chicago: University of Chicago Press.
