= Gator (film) =

1976 film by Burt Reynolds

- Theatrical release poster by Robert McGinnis
- Directed by: Burt Reynolds
- Written by: William W. Norton
- Produced by: Jules V. Levy; Arthur Gardner
- Starring: Burt Reynolds; Jack Weston; Lauren Hutton; Jerry Reed
- Cinematography: William A. Fraker
- Edited by: Harold F. Kress
- Music by: Charles Bernstein
- Production company: Levy-Gardner-Laven
- Distributed by: United Artists
- Release dates: May 8, 1976 (Savannah, Georgia); July 28, 1976 (USA)
- Running time: 115 minutes
- Country: United States
- Language: English
- Box office: $11,000,000

Gator is a 1976 American action comedy film and a sequel to White Lightning starring and directed by Burt Reynolds in his directorial debut.

The film is primarily set in Georgia. In the film, ex-convict Gator McKlusky is blackmailed into working for federal agent Irving Greenfield. He is tasked with investigating the operations of local crime boss Bama McCall, who used to be Gator's friend. Gator is disgusted when he finds out that Bama is profiting from child prostitution, motivating him to destroy Bama's criminal empire.

== Plot ==
Federal agent Irving Greenfield confers with the Governor of Georgia about the corruption problem in fictional Dunston County and local boss "Bama" McCall. Irving intends to find Gator McKlusky, an old buddy of Bama's just out of prison, to help get the goods on Bama. When Irving mentions that "cleaning up" Dunston County would help his re-election, the governor agrees to give Irving whatever he needs.

Irving visits Gator who is back with his father Ned and daughter Suzie in the Okefenokee Swamp. Gator is uninterested at first, but reconsiders when Irving threatens to put Ned in jail and Suzie in foster care. They drive to Dunston, where Gator reunites with Bama at a political rally and is immediately hired as a collector. Gator also locks eyes with TV reporter Aggie Maybank, who is after a story. After treating Gator to a taste of the high life, Bama secretly orders a background check on him, and Gator gets a closer look at Bama's empire: extortion, drugs, and corruption at every level. Then Bama sets Gator up with one of the girls at his brothel, a drugged cheerleader Gator remembers from the rally; she says that all the girls there are minors, which Bama prefers.

Disgusted, Gator wants out, and Bama gives him a spiked drink and says he will wake up in his car parked at the county line pointed toward home. As promised, Gator wakes up in his car at daybreak, but now he wants to get Bama. Meanwhile, Irving is trying to fit in by hanging out at a local bar and making conversation when corrupt cop Pogie recognizes him and gets word to Bama's enforcers Smiley and Bones, who injure Irving bad enough to be hospitalized.

At the hospital, Gator meets Aggie, who wants to see Irving. She tells of Emmeline Cavanaugh, a "cat lady" fired from the Dunston County courthouse after 22 years. Gator and Aggie visit Emmeline, who mentions secret ledgers in the courthouse basement. That night, using stolen keys, they sneak in and find the ledgers, but a guard hits the alarm. The police quickly descend, but the intruders escape in a patrol car, pick up Irving, and go to Aggie's uncle's beach house nearby. Gator and Aggie slip out to the beach for the night while Irving and Emmeline get acquainted.

At daybreak, while Gator and Aggie go to call Irving's boss Jack Bridger, Bama and Bones arrive, kill Irving, and set fire to the house to destroy the ledgers; Bones tries to haul Emmeline away, but she breaks free and is killed when she tries to rescue her cats. Seeing the fire, Gator and Aggie hide at a nearby motel. He first calls Jack to come and get them, then Bama to tell him that he has some of the tax records and wants $2,000 and a plane ticket home in exchange for his location; Bama apparently agrees. When they arrive, Bama sends Bones into the room to kill Gator and Aggie, but he is killed by an exploding booby trap set by Gator, who then emerges and chases Bama to the nearby beach. Gator beats him in a fistfight just as a police helicopter approaches.

Later, Aggie is in a celebratory mood; her story has gone national and CBS wants her to work in New York. Gator tells her he loves her but, realizing they have no future together, he reluctantly heads home.

== Cast ==
- Burt Reynolds as Bobby "Gator" McKlusky
- Jack Weston as Irving Greenfield
- Lauren Hutton as Aggie Maybank
- Jerry Reed as "Bama" McCall
- Alice Ghostley as Emmeline Cavanaugh
- Dub Taylor as Mayor Caffrey
- Mike Douglas as The Governor
- Burton Gilliam as Smiley
- William Engesser as "Bones"
- John Steadman as Ned McKlusky
- Lori Futch as Suzie McKlusky
- Stephanie Burchfield as Young Girl
- Dudley Remus as Deputy Pogie
- Alex Hawkins as Police Chief
- Don Ferguson as Bartender
- John Nicholson as Jack Bridger

Reynolds honored his favorite professor from Palm Beach Junior College, Watson B. Duncan III, with a cameo role in the film – casting him as the Governor's press secretary.

== Production ==
Burt Reynolds says they sent him the script for the film and he refused to do it saying "it's a terrible script. Then, they asked me if I wanted to direct? And I said 'It's a wonderful script'." "I waited 20 years to do it and I enjoyed it more than anything I've ever done in this business," Reynolds said after filming. "And I happen to think it's what I do best."

Reynolds said he asked advice from Peter Bogdanovich, Robert Aldrich and Mel Brooks about how to direct. He says Bogdanovich told him "only cut on a move", Aldrich said to "listen to everyone then make up your own mind" and Brooks said to fire someone on the first day. "I think I'm an actor's director," said Reynolds. "I love actors. And I don't mean that to sound like a stupid thing coming from an actor. I realize how terribly personal acting is, how difficult it is. And I also realize and know some actors need to be coerced, some have to be kissed, some have to be driven, some have to be spoiled, some have to be yelled at, and you can't treat them all the same."

The film was shot in Savannah, Georgia and Banks Lakes NWR in Lakeland, Georgia.

== Reception ==
On Rotten Tomatoes the film has an approval rating of 14%, based on reviews from 7 critics.

Roger Ebert gave the film 1.5 stars out of 4 and called it "yet another Good Ol' Movie ... If only it had a Good Ol' Plot worth a damn, it might have even been a halfway tolerable ol' movie." Richard Eder of The New York Times wrote, "It is not a terrible picture, and it has some good things in it. But it proceeds like a sleepwalker, perpetually waking and wondering what it is doing, and falling asleep and doing it some more." Arthur D. Murphy of Variety declared, "There's nothing wrong with an unabashed popcorn picture, but there's no reason for Gator to be as uneven, contrived, untidy as it is ... The United Artists release never takes itself seriously, veering as it does through many incompatible dramatic and violent moods for nearly two hours." Gene Siskel of the Chicago Tribune gave the film 2 stars out of 4 and wrote, "Unfortunately, the makers of the sequel forgot to include the very elements that made White Lightning a hit: a good story and a fine romance." Charles Champlin of the Los Angeles Times wrote, "Gator looks exactly what it is, a commercial concoction assembled for an undemanding mass market. On those terms it will probably work well enough; it is fast and splashy pulp stuff, coming as near as the movies get to Dime Adventure." Gary Arnold of The Washington Post described the film as "peculiarly ambivalent and dismaying," which "derives directly from Reynolds. One can see it in his glum, detached performance as well as feel it in the aimless, miscalculated turns the story takes." Richard Combs of The Monthly Film Bulletin wrote, "Elaborately gauche in all its parts as it is, however, Gator acquires a certain shaggy-dog charm overall, perhaps because of the exemplary lack of seriousness with which everyone takes it."

== Legacy ==
The film has been referenced multiple times in the series Archer, where the title character Sterling Archer (H. Jon Benjamin) often calls it his favorite movie.
