= Ask Me What I Am =

Album by Burt Reynolds

Studio album by Burt Reynolds
- Released: November 5, 1973
- Genres: Easy listening, country
- Length: 33:07
- Label: Mercury/Phonogram
- Producers: Bobby Goldsboro and Buddy Killen

Singles from Ask Me What I Am
- 1. "A Room for a Boy Never Used" Released: November 19, 1973; 2. "She's Taken a Gentle Lover" Released: February 1974

Ask Me What I Am is a 1973 album by actor Burt Reynolds. His only album, it was produced by Bobby Goldsboro and Buddy Killen. The album was released on the Mercury/Phonogram label.

Professional ratings
Review scores
Source	Rating
Christgau's Record Guide	E+

== Track listing ==
1. "Childhood 1949" — 3:12 (Bobby Goldsboro)
2. "Slow John Fairburn" — 4:00 (Red Lane)
3. "The First One That I Lay With" — 2:41 (Red Lane, Tom McKeon)
4. "Till I Get It Right" — 2:20 (Larry Henley, Red Lane)
5. "She's Taken A Gentle Lover" — 3:50 (Deena Kaye Rose)
6. "You Can't Always Sing a Happy Song" — 2:38 (Ed Bruce, Tom McKeon)
7. "Ask Me What I Am" — 2:50 (Paul Hampton)
8. "A Room for a Boy Never Used" — 3:22 (Deena Kaye Rose)
9. "I Didn't Shake the World Today" — 2:53 (John Hadley)
10. "There's a Slight Misunderstanding Between God and Man" — 3:10 (Paul Hampton)
11. "I Like Having You Around" — 2:10 (Red Lane)

== Performers ==
- Burt Reynolds – lead vocals
- Buzz Cason, Carol Montgomery, Ginger Holladay - Backing Vocals
- Joe Allen, Mike Leech – Bass
- Larrie London – Drums
- Bobby Goldsboro, Johnny Christopher, Reggie Young – Guitar
- Timmy Tappan – Harpsichord
- Bobby Emmons – Organ
- Bobby Wood – Piano
- Brenton Banks, Byron Bach, Gary Van Osdale, George Brinkley III, Harry Lantz, Jim Stephany, Martha McCrory, Marvin Chantry, Samuel Terranova, Sheldon Kurland, Solie Isaac Fott, Stephanie Woolf, Steven Smith – Strings
