= Sam Allgood =

American economist

- Education: University of Georgia (BA, PhD)
- Spouse: Kathy Farrell
- Children: 3
- Scientific career
- Fields: Economics
- Workplaces: University of Nebraska–Lincoln
- Website: Official website

Sam Allgood is an American economist. He is the faculty director of the Teaching and Learning Center and Edwin J. Faulkner Professor of Economics at the University of Nebraska–Lincoln. He is co-editor of the Journal of Economic Education. He chaired the American Economic Association’s Committee on Economic Education, and is now chair of the Association's Task Force on Outreach to High School and Undergraduate Students in Economics.

== Career ==
Allgood has been a member of the faculty of the University of Nebraska–Lincoln since 1993. He is a researcher in the area of economic education, with published work on students' knowledge of economics and the impact of studying economics on financial decision-making.

=== Selected works ===
- Allgood, Sam, and William B. Walstad. "The effects of perceived and actual financial literacy on financial behaviors." Economic inquiry 54, no. 1 (2016): 675–697.
- Allgood, Sam, and Kathleen A. Farrell. "The match between CEO and firm." the Journal of Business 76, no. 2 (2003): 317–341.
- Allgood, Sam, William B. Walstad, and John J. Siegfried. "Research on teaching economics to undergraduates." Journal of Economic Literature 53, no. 2 (2015): 285–325.
- Walstad, William B., and Sam Allgood. "What do college seniors know about economics?." American Economic Review 89, no. 2 (1999): 350–354.
- Allgood, Sam, and Arthur Snow. "The marginal cost of raising tax revenue and redistributing income." Journal of Political Economy 106, no. 6 (1998): 1246–1273.
