= The Midnight Patrol (1932 film) =

1932 film directed by Christy Cabanne

- Directed by: Christy Cabanne
- Screenplay by: George Jeske; Barry Barringer
- Story by: Arthur Hoerl
- Produced by: C.C. Burr
- Starring: Regis Toomey; Betty Bronson; Edwina Booth
- Cinematography: Lewis Physioc
- Edited by: Thomas Persons
- Production company: C.C. Burr Productions
- Distributed by: Monogram Pictures
- Release date: April 10, 1932 (US)
- Running time: 67 minutes
- Country: United States
- Language: English

The Midnight Patrol is a 1932 American pre-Code drama film, directed by Christy Cabanne. Written by George Jeske (screenplay) and Arthur Hoeri (story), it stars Regis Toomey, Betty Bronson, and Edwina Booth, and was released on April 10, 1932.

== Cast ==
- Regis Toomey as Johnny Martin
- Betty Bronson as Ellen Grey
- Edwina Booth as Joyce Greeley
- Mary Nolan as Miss Willing
- Earle Foxe as Judson
- Robert Elliott as Howard Brady
- Eddie Kane as Stuart
- William Norton Bailey as Powers
- Mischa Auer as Dummy Black
