= Trapped in Tia Juana =

1932 film

- Theatrical release poster
- Directed by: Wallace Fox
- Written by: Wallace Fox; Carlos F. Borcosque; Bernard McConville
- Based on: "Beside the Rio Grande" by Rex Lease
- Produced by: George W. Weeks
- Starring: Edwina Booth; Duncan Renaldo
- Cinematography: Ernest Miller
- Edited by: Jeanne Spencer
- Production company: Action Pictures
- Distributed by: Mayfair Pictures
- Release date: August 15, 1932
- Running time: 60 minutes
- Country: United States
- Language: English

Trapped in Tia Juana is a 1932 American pre-Code Western film directed by Wallace Fox. Duncan Renaldo plays twin brothers separated at birth: West Point graduate Kenneth Holbert and Mexican bandit El Zorro.

== Cast ==
- Edwina Booth as Dorothy
- Duncan Renaldo as Kenneth Holbert/El Zorro
