= Edwina Booth =

American actress (1904–1991)

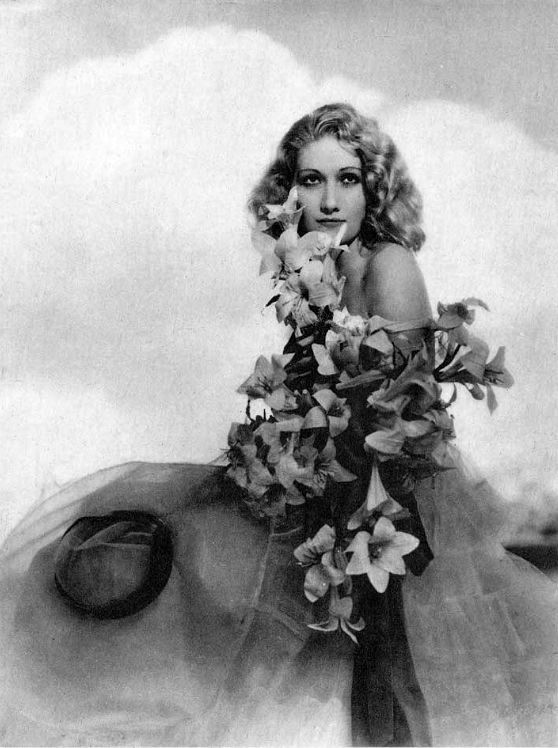
- Born: Josephine Constance Woodruff; September 13, 1904; Provo, Utah, U.S.
- Died: May 18, 1991 (aged 86); Long Beach, California, U.S.
- Occupation: Actress
- Years active: 1928–1932
- Spouses: Anthony Shuck (annulled) Urial Leo Higham (m. 1951; died 1957) Reinhold L. Fehlberg (m. 1959; died 1984)

Edwina Booth (born Josephine Constance Woodruff; September 13, 1904 – May 18, 1991) was an American actress. She is best known for the 1931 film Trader Horn, during the filming of which she contracted an illness which effectively ended her movie career.

== Early life and discovery ==
She was born in Provo, Utah on September 13, 1904, to James Lloyd Woodruff and Josephine Booth Woodruff. She was the oldest of their five children. Her father was a doctor. She suffered from hypoglycemia, which left her with little energy and kept her from completing any full year of school. Her family moved to Venice, California, in 1921 due to her father contracting influenza. As a young adult, Woodruff watched many movies during her free time.

Her stage name was Edwina Booth: her favorite granduncle was named Edwin and her grandfather's last name was Booth.

Booth was discovered while sunbathing on a California beach by director E. J. Babille. He gave her a business card and she went to the Metropolitan Studio to take her first screen test a few days later. She got her first part in 1926 in a silent film. In 1928, Booth was cast in the Dorothy Arzner-directed Manhattan Cocktail. She was on vacation following a 1927 stage appearance when film director E. Mason Hopper saw her and offered her a part in a Marie Prevost picture. Metro-Goldwyn-Mayer (MGM) was impressed with her, and cast Booth in supporting roles.

== Trader Horn incident ==
Her career — and life — was changed forever when the studio cast her in its new jungle epic Trader Horn opposite Harry Carey. MGM gave the production a fairly large budget, and sent cast and crew on location in East Africa. Until 1929, the only films shot in Africa were travelogues, but MGM was hoping the idea of "location shooting" might increase the film's commercial appeal. The crew was inexperienced and ill-equipped for filming in Africa, a problem exacerbated by MGM's last-minute decision to shoot the film with sound.

When Booth left the United States, she had a fever of 104. En route to Africa, on board the SS Ussukama, director W. S. Van Dyke told her to sunbathe on deck to acclimate herself to the African sun. Instead, it gave her third-degree burns. She fainted that evening during dinner, and was put in the care of Olive Carey, the wife of actor Harry Carey, who had accompanied him to the shoot.

In Africa, she had to cope with the heat and insects. While filming, she suffered a sunstroke and fell out of a tree. The makers of the film believed her role as "The White Goddess" required her to be scantily clad, which caused her to be cut by elephant grass and likely increased her susceptibility to mosquito bites. She also sustained a large number of tick bites.

Booth contracted malaria during shooting. (In an interview with Dick Cavett in 1973, Katharine Hepburn said Booth contracted schistosomiasis, and incorrectly stated that Booth had died.) At night, she suffered from insomnia and blinding headaches.

The production had a local doctor, but the only Western medicine he had access to was baking soda, quinine, and a laxative. The production begged producer Irving Thalberg via cable to send a mobile ambulance unit and special first aid, but he did not. Production went on for several months (much longer than average production time in those days), and the film wasn't released until 1931. Despite many problems with the film's production, Trader Horn was a success, securing an Academy Award nomination for Best Picture.

Booth fared much worse; it took her six years to fully recover physically. She sued MGM for over a million dollars, explaining she had been provided with inadequate protection and inadequate clothing during the African shoot. She claimed she had been forced to sunbathe nude for extended periods during filming. Olive Carey testified that Thalberg did not provide medical transport or extra care to Booth because he said he was concerned about the film's budget. The case received a lot of attention in the tabloids and was eventually settled out of court. At the time, the terms were not disclosed; however, Brigham Young University archives indicate she settled for $35,000. amounting to at least $600,000 in today's money.

Booth's acting career never recovered. Neither MGM nor the other major studios had any intentions of employing her, which created an opportunity for producer Nat Levine of the low-budget Mascot Pictures. Levine saw a chance to capitalize on the success of Trader Horn by reuniting its stars Harry Carey and Edwina Booth for two adventure serials, The Vanishing Legion and The Last of the Mohicans. The films were successful within their limited market, but failed to propel Booth's movie career forward.

== Later years ==
In 1935, Booth and her father went to Europe to seek medical treatment. When she returned to the United States, she was confined to a dark room. She refused to talk of her time as a movie star later in her life. Booth withdrew completely from the public eye, although she continued to receive fan mail for the rest of her life. She declared that she would be dedicating all of her future leisure and a large proportion of her earnings to the alleviation of human suffering, "My years of illness have not been wasted," she informed the local press. "I have learned to love mankind." She became more active in the Church of Jesus Christ of Latter-day Saints and worked in the Los Angeles California Temple.

== Marriages ==
Booth was married three times. All the unions were childless. Anthony Shuck, her first husband, had their marriage annulled soon after her return from Africa. She married her second husband, Urial Leo Higham, on November 21, 1951; he died in 1956. Her third husband was Reinold Fehlberg. They were married from 1959 until his death in 1983. There were many false rumors and reports of her demise until her actual death on May 18, 1991.

She died of heart failure in Long Beach, California. and is buried in Santa Monica's Woodlawn Cemetery.

== Filmography ==
Year	Film	Role	Notes
1928	Manhattan Cocktail		
1929	Our Modern Maidens	Undetermined role	Uncredited
1931	Trader Horn	Nina Trent, the White Goddess	
1931	The Vanishing Legion	Caroline Hall	(serial)
1932	Midnight Patrol	Joyce Greeley	
1932	The Last of the Mohicans	Cora Munro	(serial)
1932	Trapped in Tia Juana	Dorothy Brandon	Alternative title: Her Lover's Brother
