= Trader Horn =

Ivory trader and author (1861–1931)

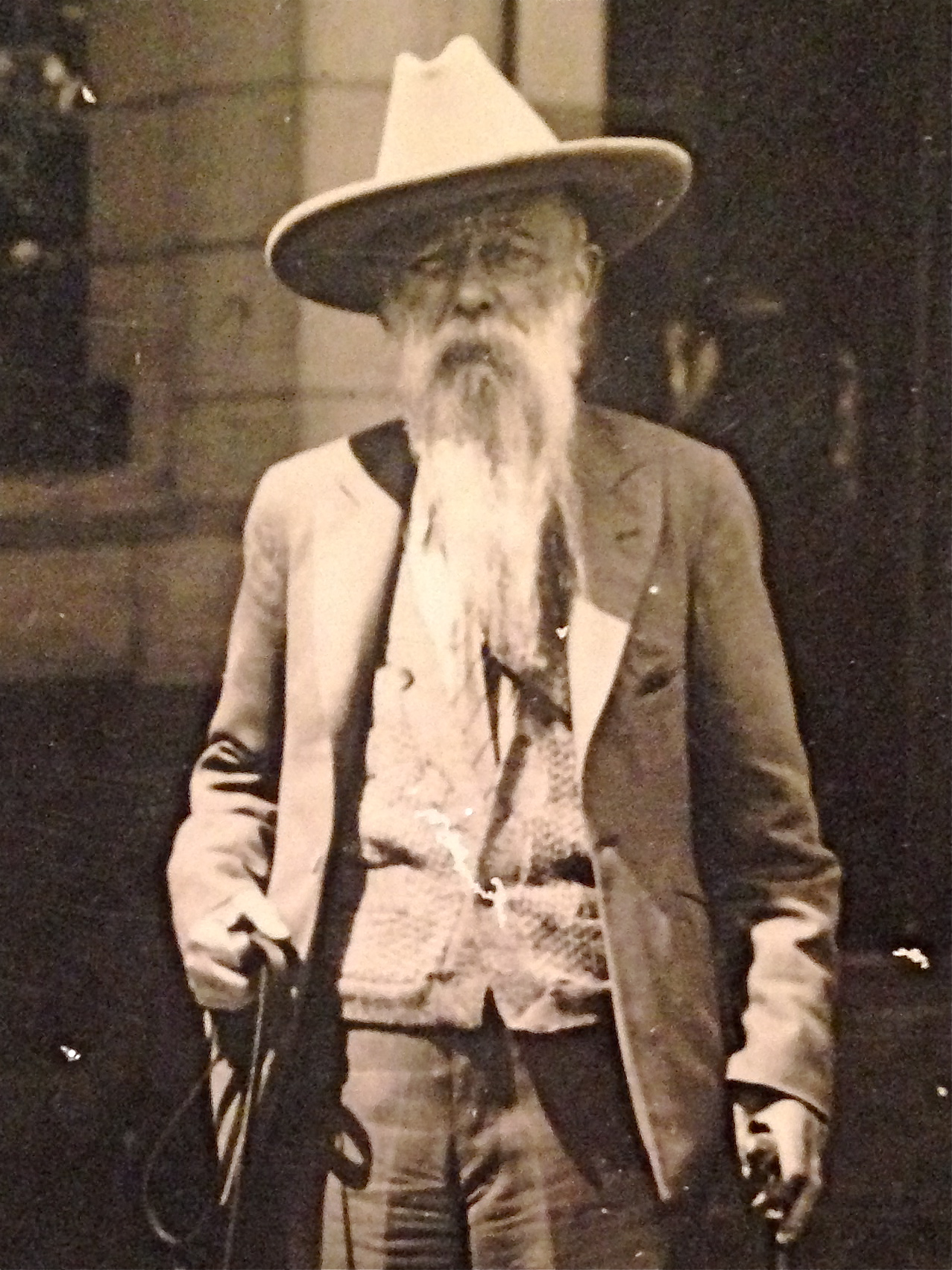
- Horn in 1929
- Born: Alfred Aloysius Smith; 21 June 1861
- Died: June 26, 1931 (aged 70)
- Occupation: Ivory trader

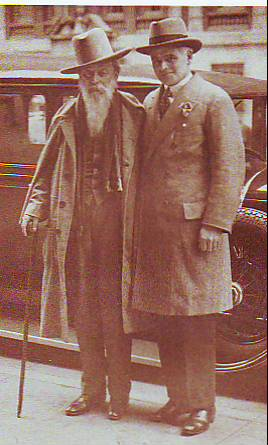
Trader Horn (left) with Andrew Dakers, the literary agent for Ethelreda Lewis, in New York City in 1927.

Alfred Aloysius "Trader" Horn (born Alfred Aloysius Smith; 21 June 1861 – 26 June 1931) was an ivory trader in central Africa.

His memoirs detailing his journeys, were transcribed and edited by the novelist Ethelreda Lewis and published in three volumes. The memoir also documents his efforts to free slaves; meeting the founder of Rhodesia, Cecil Rhodes; and liberating a princess from captivity.

== Film adaptations ==
- Trader Horn (1931)
- Trader Horn (1973)

== Memoirs ==
- Horn, Alfred Aloysius. Trader Horn; Being the Life and Works of Aloysius Horn, an "Old Visiter" ... the works written by himself at the age of seventy-three and the life, with such of his philosophy as is the gift of age and experience, taken down and here edited by Ethelreda Lewis;
  - Vol. I: The Ivory Coast in the Earlies: the narrative of a boy trader's adventures in the Seventies, through which runs the strange thread that is the History - meagre, but all that is available - of a young English Gentlewoman; with a foreword by John Galsworthy. London: Jonathan Cape, 1927; New York: Garden City Publishing Co., 1927 (302pp.)
  - Vol. II: Harold the Webbed or The Young Vykings; with a foreword by William McFee. London: Jonathan Cape, 1928; New York: Simon & Schuster, 1928 (275pp.)
  - Vol. III: The Waters of Africa. London: Jonathan Cape, 1929; New York: Simon & Schuster, 1929 (279pp.)

== Later editions ==
- Horn, Alfred Aloysius; Lewis, Ethelreda (1938), Trader Horn: The Ivory Coast in the earlies : written at the age of seventy-three with such of the author's philosophy as is the gift of age and experience taken down and here, Penguin
- Horn, Alfred Aloysius; Lewis, Ethelreda (1969), Trader horn : the Ivory Coast in the earlies, written at the age of seventy-three with such of the author's philosophy as is the gift of age and experience taken down and here, Howard Baker, ISBN 978-0-09-307940-4
- Horn, Alfred Aloysius; Lewis, Ethelreda (1994), Trader Horn the Ivory Coast in the earlies, Association for the Blind of W.A
- Horn, Alfred Aloysius; Lewis, Ethelreda (2002), Trader Horn : a young man's astounding adventures in 19th century equatorial Africa, Travelers' Tales; Berkeley : Distributed by Publishers Group West, ISBN 978-1-885211-81-1

== Other works ==
- list of publications and editions
