= Trader Horn (1931 film) =

1931 film

- Theatrical release poster
- Directed by: W.S. Van Dyke
- Written by: Dale Van Every (adaptation); John T. Neville (adaptation); Cyril Hume (dialogue)
- Screenplay by: Richard Schayer
- Based on: Trader Horn; 1927 book by Alfred Aloysius Horn and Ethelreda Lewis
- Produced by: Irving Thalberg (uncredited)
- Starring: Harry Carey; Edwina Booth; Duncan Renaldo
- Cinematography: Clyde De Vinna
- Edited by: Ben Lewis
- Music by: James McKay
- Distributed by: Metro-Goldwyn-Mayer
- Release dates: February 3, 1931 (New York City, premiere)
- Running time: 122 minutes
- Country: United States
- Language: English
- Budget: $1.3 million
- Box office: $4.2 million (worldwide rentals)

Trader Horn is a 1931 American pre-Code adventure film directed by W.S. Van Dyke and starring Harry Carey and Edwina Booth. It is the first non-documentary film shot on location in Africa. The film is based on the book of the same name by trader and adventurer Alfred Aloysius Horn and tells of adventures on safari in Africa.

The film's dialogue was written by Cyril Hume. John Thomas Neville and Dale Van Every wrote the adaption. Trader Horn was nominated for the Academy Award for Best Picture in 1931. Edwina Booth, the female lead, contracted a career-ending illness while filming in Africa, for which she later sued Metro-Goldwyn-Mayer.

== Plot ==
The film depicts the adventures of real-life trader and adventurer Alfred Aloysius "Trader" Horn, while on safari in Africa. Much of the film is fictional, including the discovery of a white blonde jungle queen, the lost daughter of a missionary. A scene based upon a genuine incident occurs in which Carey as Horn swings on a vine across a river filled with genuine crocodiles, one of which comes very close to taking his leg off.

== Cast (in credits order) ==
- Harry Carey as Aloysius 'Trader' Horn
- Edwina Booth as Nina Trent, The White Goddess
- Duncan Renaldo as Peru
- Mutia Omoolu as Rencharo, Horn's native translator and majordomo
- Olive Golden as Edith Trent
- Bob Kortman (scenes deleted)
- Marjorie Rambeau as Edith Trent (scenes deleted)
- C. Aubrey Smith as St. Clair, a Trader (uncredited)
- Riano Tindama as Witch Doctor (uncredited)

== Production ==
Many accidents and delays occurred during filming in Africa. Many of the crew, including the director W.S. Van Dyke, contracted malaria. An African crewman fell into a river and was eaten by a crocodile, while another was killed by a charging rhinoceros. The rhinoceros was captured on film and the scene was used in the final print. Swarms of many insects, including locusts and tse-tse flies, were common and cast and crew were perpetually bitten or stung.

Female lead Edwina Booth became infected, probably with malaria or schistosomiasis during filming. It took six years for her to fully recover from this and other conditions she endured. She retired from acting soon after and sued Metro-Goldwyn-Mayer. The case was settled out of court. A sound crew, sent halfway through filming, were unable to produce good quality work. This resulted in most of the dialogue sequences being reshot at the MGM studios in Culver City, California. This caused rumours that the entire production had been filmed there, so most of this footage was cut from the final release. Many animal scenes were filmed in Tecate, Mexico, by a second unit to avoid the American laws on the ethical treatment of animals. For example, lions were reportedly starved to promote vicious attacks on hyenas, monkeys and deer.

== Release ==
The film earned $1,642,000 in rentals in the United States and Canada and $1,953,000 overseas for a total of $3,595,000. Subsequent reissues added a further $596,000 bringing its total worldwide rental to $4,191,000 and a profit to $1.3 million.

== Other adaptations ==
Metro-Goldwyn-Mayer remade the film, released in 1973. Although filmed on the MGM backlot, the 1973 remake used tinted stock footage from the 1931 film. A sexploitation parody film titled Trader Hornee was released in 1970 directed by David F. Friedman. Trader Horn is the subject of a 2009 documentary, Trader Horn: The Journey Back featuring Harry Carey Jr.

== See also ==
- Harry Carey filmography
- Nudity in film
