= Journal of Economic Education =

- Language: English
- Edited by: Sam Allgood, KimMarie McGoldrick

Publication details
- History: 1969–present
- Publisher: Taylor and Francis (United States)
- Frequency: Quarterly

Standard abbreviations
- ISO 4: J. Econ. Educ.

Indexing
- ISSN: 0022-0485 (print); 2152-4068 (web)
- LCCN: 71011157
- JSTOR: 00220485
- OCLC no.: 44519025

Links
- Journal homepage; Online archive

The Journal of Economic Education (JEE) offers original peer-reviewed articles on teaching economics. The inaugural issue appeared in the fall of 1969. At the time, G.L. Bach (Stanford University) wrote in the American Economic Review Papers and Proceedings (1971) that the JEE was to be the forum for scholarly work in economic education, primarily at the undergraduate level in colleges and universities, but including junior colleges and, to some extent, the high schools.

In the early days, the Council for Economic Education (then call the Joint Council and later the National Council) oversaw publication of the JEE, and members of the American Economic Association Committee on Economic Education served as the editorial board, with Henry Villard (City University of New York) serving as editor. The Council for Economic Education assigned the JEE copyright and publishing responsibility to the nonprofit Heldref Publications in 1981. The Council, however, retained responsibility for appointing the editor and providing financial support to the editorial office.

In 1983, Donald Paden (University of Illinois) became editor when the JEE expanded to a quarterly publication. Kalman Goldberg (Bradley University) became editor in 1986. The editorial offices moved to Indiana University in 1989, when William Becker became editor. Late in 2009, William Walstad (University of Nebraska at Lincoln) became editor and Heldref sold the JEE to the for-profit Taylor & Francis Group. In 2018, Sam Allgood and KimMarie McGoldrick became co-editors of the journal.
